= 2007–08 Second League of the Republika Srpska =

The 2007–08 Second League of the Republika Srpska season was the thirteenth since its establishment.

Group West consist of team from Banja Luka Region; Group Centre consist of team from Doboj Region, Brčko District and Bijeljina Region; Group South consist of team from Sarajevo-Romanija Region, Vlasenica Region, Foča Region and Trebinje Region

== Group West ==
Pos	Team	Pld	W	D	L	GF	GA	GD	Pts	Promotion or relegation
1	Rudar Prijedor	30	25	3	2	79	15	+64	78	Promoted to First League of Republika Srpska
2	Sloga Trn	30	25	3	2	76	22	+54	78	
3	Mladost Kotor Varoš	30	14	9	7	48	26	+22	51	
4	Župa-Milka	30	15	6	9	57	39	+18	51	
5	Jedinstvo Žeravica	30	14	9	7	36	20	+16	51	
6	Sloboda Mrkonjić Grad	30	15	3	12	49	33	+16	48	
7	Krajina Banja Luka	30	13	9	8	42	28	+14	48	
8	Sloga Srbac	30	14	5	11	60	37	+23	47	
9	Ravan Međeđa	30	13	7	10	40	41	−1	46	
10	Sloga-DIPO	30	13	5	12	58	54	+4	44	
11	Bratstvo Kozinci	30	9	7	14	32	44	−12	34	Relegated
12	Vrbas Banja Luka	30	6	10	14	31	61	−30	28	Relegated
13	Lauš Banja Luka	30	8	2	20	28	52	−24	26	Relegated
14	Lijevče Nova Topola	30	5	5	20	25	64	−39	20	Relegated
15	Sloga Rakelici	30	2	7	21	19	66	−47	13	Relegated
16	Omladinac Banja Luka	30	2	4	24	25	103	−78	10	Relegated

== Group Centre ==
Pos	Team	Pld	W	D	L	GF	GA	GD	Pts	Promotion or relegation
1	Jedinstvo Brčko	30	20	8	2	57	19	+38	68	Promoted to First League of Republika Srpska
2	Podrinje Janja	30	18	5	7	68	24	+44	59	Group East in 2008-09
3	Mladost Sandići	30	17	4	9	58	33	+25	55	?
4	Lokomotiva Brčko	30	16	7	7	50	28	+22	55	Group East in 2008-09
5	Proleter Dvorovi	30	16	5	9	59	44	+15	53	Group East in 2008-09
6	Tekstilac Derventa	30	15	5	10	41	27	+14	50	Group West in 2008-09
7	Gorica	30	15	3	12	48	39	+9	50 (Note: 2 bonus points?)	Group East in 2008-09
8	Željezničar Doboj	30	14	3	13	57	48	+9	45	Group West in 2008-09
9	Ozren Petrovo	30	14	1	15	44	48	−4	43	Group West in 2008-09
10	Polet Bosanski Brod	30	13	3	14	50	38	+12	42	Group West in 2008-09
11	Jedinstvo Brodac	30	13	3	14	40	35	+5	42	Group East in 2008-09
12	Mladost Lončari	30	11	4	15	42	43	−1	37	Relegated
13	BSK Ledinci	30	10	6	14	45	51	−6	36	Relegated
14	Vranjak	30	9	2	19	27	59	−32	29	Group West in 2008-09
15	Vučijak Majevac	30	4	4	22	23	81	−58	16	Relegated
16	Trebava Osiječani	30	3	1	26	29	121	−92	10	Relegated

== Group South ==
Pos	Team	Pld	W	D	L	GF	GA	GD	Pts	Promotion or relegation
1	Glasinac Sokolac	26	22	2	2	76	10	+66	68	Promoted to First League of Republika Srpska
2	Napredak Šepak Donji	26	21	2	3	72	17	+55	65	
3	Romanija Pale	26	14	4	8	34	20	+14	46	
4	Velež Nevesinje	26	14	3	9	34	22	+12	45	
5	Mladost Rogatica	26	14	2	10	46	34	+12	44	
6	Vlasenica	26	12	7	7	49	31	+18	43	
7	Han Pijesak	26	11	3	12	30	31	−1	36	
8	Podrinje Tršić	26	9	7	10	31	32	−1	34	
9	Šekovići	26	9	6	11	35	42	−7	33	
10	Rudo	26	7	7	12	31	44	−13	28	Relegated
11	Bratstvo Bratunac	26	7	2	17	28	63	−35	23	Relegated
12	Hercegovac Bileća	26	6	3	17	23	47	−24	21	Relegated
13	Stakorina Čajniče	26	5	6	15	16	51	−35	15 (Note: 6 points deducted)	Relegated
14	Željeznica Trnovo	26	4	0	22	23	84	−61	12	Relegated
