= 1995–96 First League of the Republika Srpska =

The 1995–96 First League of the Republika Srpska was the first season since establishment. Since Football Association of Republika Srpska is not a member of UEFA nor FIFA, league champion did not qualify for European tournament.

== Group East ==
=== League table ===
| Pos | Team | Pld | W | D | L | GF | GA | GD | Pts | Qualification or relegation |
|---|---|---|---|---|---|---|---|---|---|---|
| 1 | Boksit (C) | 20 | 15 | 3 | 2 | 59 | 13 | +46 | 48 | Advanced to final |
| 2 | Glasinac | 20 | 11 | 2 | 7 | 40 | 27 | +13 | 35 | |
| 3 | Sarajevo (East) | 20 | 10 | 3 | 7 | 29 | 38 | −9 | 33 | |
| 4 | Mladost Rogatica | 20 | 9 | 4 | 7 | 32 | 27 | +5 | 31 | |
| 5 | Jedinstvo Brčko | 20 | 10 | 1 | 9 | 26 | 35 | −9 | 31 | |
| 6 | Panteri Bijeljina | 21 | 8 | 3 | 10 | 25 | 23 | +2 | 27 | |
| 7 | Leotar | 20 | 8 | 2 | 10 | 38 | 30 | +8 | 26 | |
| 8 | Slavija | 20 | 7 | 4 | 9 | 23 | 30 | −7 | 25 | |
| 9 | Željezničar Lukavica (R) | 20 | 6 | 7 | 7 | 30 | 36 | −6 | 25 | Relegation to Second League RS |
| 10 | Drina Zvornik (R) | 20 | 5 | 5 | 10 | 30 | 38 | −8 | 20 | Relegation to Second League RS |
| 11 | Romanija Pale (R) | 20 | 2 | 4 | 14 | 13 | 48 | −35 | 10 | Relegation to Second League RS |

Source: BiHSoccer.com
Rules for classification: 1) points; 2) goal difference; 3) number of goals scored.
(C) Champions; (R) Relegated

== Group West ==
=== League table ===
| Pos | Team | Pld | W | D | L | GF | GA | GD | Pts | Qualification or relegation |
|---|---|---|---|---|---|---|---|---|---|---|
| 1 | Rudar Prijedor | 20 | 16 | 2 | 2 | 37 | 13 | +24 | 50 | Advanced to final |
| 2 | Borac Banja Luka | 20 | 14 | 6 | 0 | 50 | 13 | +37 | 48 | |
| 3 | Kozara | 20 | 8 | 6 | 6 | 37 | 20 | +17 | 30 | |
| 4 | Sloga Doboj | 20 | 8 | 3 | 9 | 19 | 18 | +1 | 27 | |
| 5 | Polet | 20 | 7 | 3 | 10 | 26 | 34 | −8 | 24 | |
| 6 | BSK | 20 | 6 | 5 | 9 | 17 | 23 | −6 | 23 | |
| 7 | Ljubić | 20 | 6 | 5 | 9 | 16 | 29 | −13 | 23 | |
| 8 | Borac Šamac | 20 | 6 | 4 | 10 | 22 | 29 | −7 | 22 | |
| 9 | Modriča (R) | 20 | 6 | 4 | 10 | 14 | 27 | −13 | 22 | Relegation to Second League RS |
| 10 | Proleter Teslić (R) | 20 | 5 | 4 | 11 | 18 | 27 | −9 | 19 | Relegation to Second League RS |
| 11 | Sloboda Novi Grad (R) | 20 | 5 | 4 | 11 | 16 | 39 | −23 | 19 | Relegation to Second League RS |

Source: BiHSoccer.com
Rules for classification: 1) points; 2) goal difference; 3) number of goals scored.
(R) Relegated

== Final ==
=== First leg ===
27 July 1996

| Boksit | 5–2 | Rudar Prijedor |
|---|---|---|
| Krajšumović 13'; Đerić 32', 60'; Mišić 77' (pen.); Simić 90' | Report | Vranješ 7'; Zgornjanin 10' |

Stadion Supač Polje, Milići
Attendance: 6,000

=== Second leg ===
31 July 1996

| Rudar Prijedor | 2–1 | Boksit |
|---|---|---|
| M. Joškić 17'; Vranješ 36' | Report | Majstorović 86' |

Gradski stadion, Prijedor
Attendance: 2,500

Boksit won 7–3 on aggregate.

== See also ==
- 1995–96 First League of Bosnia and Herzegovina
