= 1998–99 First League of the Republika Srpska =

The 1998–99 First League of the Republika Srpska was the 4th season since establishment. Since Football Association of Republika Srpska is not a member of UEFA nor FIFA, league champion did not qualify for European tournament. Croats and Bosniaks had their own league and their champion did not qualify to European tournament either.

== Teams ==
Location of clubs in 1st League of RS 1998–99

== League table ==
Pos	Team	Pld	W	D	L	GF	GA	GD	Pts	Relegation
1	Radnik (C)	34	23	5	6	71	38	+33	74	
2	Rudar Ugljevik	34	22	7	5	80	25	+55	73	
3	Boksit	34	22	3	9	60	34	+26	69	
4	Kozara	34	17	8	9	58	36	+22	59	
5	Sloga Trn	34	18	4	12	66	40	+26	58	
6	BSK	34	19	1	14	57	40	+17	58	
7	Drina Zvornik	34	15	5	14	57	49	+8	50	
8	Sloboda Novi Grad	34	15	4	15	54	39	+15	49	
9	Glasinac	34	15	3	16	57	56	+1	48	
10	Leotar	34	13	7	14	60	58	+2	46	
11	Ljubić	34	13	7	14	54	50	+4	46	
12	Borac Banja Luka	34	13	6	15	44	39	+5	45	
13	Famos Vojkovići	34	13	5	16	35	54	−19	44	
14	Rudar Prijedor	34	12	6	16	39	46	−7	42	
15	Borac Šamac	34	13	2	19	37	64	−27	41	
16	Jedinstvo Brčko	34	11	5	18	43	70	−27	38	
17	Omladinac (R)	34	7	4	23	35	76	−41	25	Relegation to Second League RS
18	Sarajevo (East) (R)	34	4	0	30	20	113	−93	12	Relegation to Second League RS

Source: BiHSoccer.com
Rules for classification: 1) points; 2) goal difference; 3) number of goals scored.
(C) Champions; (R) Relegated

== See also ==
- 1998–99 First League of Bosnia and Herzegovina
