= First League of the Republika Srpska =

Association football league in Republika Srpska, Bosnia and Herzegovina

- Founded: 1995
- First season: 1995–96
- Country: Bosnia and Herzegovina
- Confederation: UEFA
- Number of clubs: 14
- Level on pyramid: 2
- Promotion to: Premier League
- Relegation to: Second League of RS
- Domestic cup(s): Bosnian Cup, Republika Srpska Cup
- Current champions: BSK Banja Luka (1st title) (2025–26)
- Most championships: Borac Banja Luka (5 titles)
- Broadcaster(s): RTRS
- Website: fsrs.org (in Serbian)
- Current: 2026–27 First League

The First League of the Republika Srpska (Bosnian: Prva liga Republike Srpske; Croatian: Prva liga Republike Srpske; Serbian: Прва лига Републике Српске) is a football league in Republika Srpska, Bosnia and Herzegovina. Together with the First League of the Federation of Bosnia and Herzegovina, it forms the second level of football in Bosnia and Herzegovina.

The league champion is promoted to the Premier League of Bosnia and Herzegovina. Relegated teams fall to the Second League of the Republika Srpska.

== History ==
=== Separate and second tier league ===
Since there were three different football championships in the country, organized on ethnic principles, the "First League of the Republika Srpska" was the top flight in the Republika Srpska before 2002. However, the champions of this League were not recognized by UEFA. In 2002, the top clubs from the Republika Srpska joined the Premier League of Bosnia and Herzegovina and the First League was kept as one of two second level divisions. It is still run by the Football Association of Republika Srpska, and has ended its boycott of Bosnian football on a federal level.

=== New format and expansion ===
The league changed format in the 2014–15 season and was split into two stages, the regular season and the playoffs. Each of the 12 competitors in the First League hosts every other team once in the regular season, for a total of 22 matches. A playoff phase is then played from April to May. The point system in the championship playoff is the same as during the regular season, except that each team starts with half of the points they won in the regular season, rounded up to the nearest integer. The points gained by rounding are deducted in the case of a tie. Similar systems are also used in the Belgian First Division A and the Polish Ekstraklasa.

The top six teams from the regular season enter the championship playoff, with the first-placed team winning the First League and teams ranked from 7 to 12 after the regular season enter the relegation playoffs. Each team plays their opponents once. The League champion is promoted to the Premier League at the end of the season, and the bottom clubs are relegated to the Second League of the Republika Srpska (third level). The number of relegated teams depends on how many clubs are entering the league. Those are the winners of the two third level league groups, the winner of the relegation play-off, and Republika Srpska clubs relegated from the Premier League. So, sometimes two clubs get relegated, and sometimes three or even four.

On 12 June 2020, it was confirmed that the league will be expanded from 10 to 16 teams in the 2020–21 season. On 13 June 2022, it was confirmed that the league will be expanded from 16 to 18 teams in the 2022–23 season.

== Member clubs for 2024–25 ==
Team	Last season
Zvijezda 09	Relegated
Laktaši	2.
Rudar Prijedor	3.
Leotar	4.
Željezničar Banja Luka	5.
Famos Vojkovići	6.
Kozara Gradiška	7.
Sloboda Mrkonjić Grad	8.
Slavija Sarajevo	9.
Sutjeska Foča	10.
Ljubić Prnjavor	11.
Velež Nevesinje	12.
BSK Banja Luka	13.
Drina Zvornik	14.
Borac Kozarska Dubica	15.
Romanija Pale	16.
Drina HE Višegrad	Promoted
Sloboda Novi Grad	Promoted

== League champions ==
Previous champions and winners of the league are:

Season	Champion	Runners Up	Top Goalscorer	Club	Goals
1995–96	Boksit Milići	Rudar Prijedor	Siniša Đurić; Zoran Majstorović	Kozara Gradiška; Boksit Milići	16 Goals; 16 Goals
1996–97	Rudar Ugljevik	Sloga Trn	Mladen Zgonjanin; Marić	Sloga Trn; Glasinac Sokolac	14 Goals; 14 Goals
1997–98	Rudar Ugljevik	Borac Banja Luka	Nikola Bala	Rudar Ugljevik	31 Goals
1998–99	Radnik Bijeljina	Rudar Ugljevik	Mladen Zgonjanin	Sloga Trn	23 Goals
1999–2000	Boksit Milići	Rudar Ugljevik	Nedo Zdjelar	Sloboda Novi Grad	29 Goals
2000–01	Borac Banja Luka	Sloboda Novi Grad	Milanko Đerić	Boksit Milići	26 Goals
2001–02	Leotar	Kozara Gradiška	Pavle Delibašić; Siniša Jovanović	Leotar; Glasinac Sokolac	21 Goals; 21 Goals

Since the 2002–03 season, it became a second national level competition. The league champion gets direct promotion to the Bosnian Premier League.

Season	Champion
2002–03	Modriča
2003–04	Slavija Sarajevo
2004–05	Radnik Bijeljina
2005–06	Borac Banja Luka
2006–07	Laktaši
2007–08	Borac Banja Luka
2008–09	Rudar Prijedor
2009–10	Drina Zvornik
2010–11	Kozara Gradiška
2011–12	Radnik Bijeljina
2012–13	Mladost Velika Obarska
2013–14	Drina Zvornik
2014–15	Rudar Prijedor
2015–16	Krupa
2016–17	Borac Banja Luka
2017–18	Zvijezda 09
2018–19	Borac Banja Luka
2019–20	Krupa
2020–21	Rudar Prijedor
2021–22	Krupa
2022–23	Krupa
2023–24	Radnik Bijeljina
2024–25	Laktaši
2025–26	BSK Banja Luka

== Performance by club ==
Club	Winners	Winning years
Borac Banja Luka	5	2001, 2006, 2008, 2017, 2019
Krupa	4	2016, 2020, 2022, 2023
Radnik Bijeljina	4	1999, 2005, 2012, 2024
Rudar Prijedor	3	2009, 2015, 2021
Rudar Ugljevik	2	1997, 1998
Boksit Milići	2	1996, 2000
Drina Zvornik	2	2010, 2014
Laktaši	2	2007, 2025
Leotar	1	2002
Alfa Modriča	1	2003
Slavija Sarajevo	1	2004
Kozara Gradiška	1	2011
Mladost Velika Obarska	1	2013
Zvijezda 09	1	2018
BSK Banja Luka	1	2026
