= 1999–2000 First League of the Republika Srpska =

The 1999–2000 First League of the Republika Srpska was the 5th season since establishment. Since Football Association of Republika Srpska is not a member of UEFA nor FIFA, league champion did not qualify for European tournament.

== League table ==
Pos	Team	Pld	W	D	L	GF	GA	GD	Pts	Relegation
1	Boksit (C)	38	26	4	8	84	28	+56	82	
2	Rudar Ugljevik	38	23	9	6	91	24	+67	78	
3	Leotar	38	22	9	7	80	33	+47	75	
4	Sloboda Novi Grad	38	21	8	9	71	32	+39	71	
5	Modriča	38	19	6	13	51	34	+17	63	
6	Radnik	38	16	11	11	67	35	+32	59	
7	BSK	38	18	5	15	59	42	+17	59	
8	Borac Banja Luka	38	16	11	11	70	40	+30	59	
9	Kozara	38	17	6	15	51	40	+11	57	
10	Glasinac	38	17	5	16	58	44	+14	56	
11	Ljubić	38	16	8	14	54	50	+4	56	
12	Mladost Gacko	38	16	7	15	52	50	+2	55	
13	Rudar Prijedor	38	17	4	17	45	47	−2	55	
14	Drina Zvornik (R)	38	16	6	16	50	43	+7	54	Relegation to Second League RS
15	Borac Šamac (R)	38	15	5	18	50	52	−2	50	Relegation to Second League RS
16	Sloga Doboj (R)	38	15	1	22	46	65	−19	46	Relegation to Second League RS
17	Jedinstvo Brčko (R)	38	14	3	21	50	79	−29	45	Relegation to Second League RS
18	Famos Vojkovići (R)	38	11	4	23	40	76	−36	37	Relegation to Second League RS
19	Sloga Srbac (R)	38	7	1	30	40	94	−54	22	Relegation to Second League RS
20	Sloga Trn (R)	38	1	1	36	15	211	−196	4	Relegation to Second League RS

Source: BiHSoccer.com, RSSSF.org
Rules for classification: 1) points; 2) goal difference; 3) number of goals scored.
(C) Champions; (R) Relegated

== See also ==
- 1999–2000 First League of Bosnia and Herzegovina
