= Vlado Jagodić =

Bosnian football manager (born 1964)

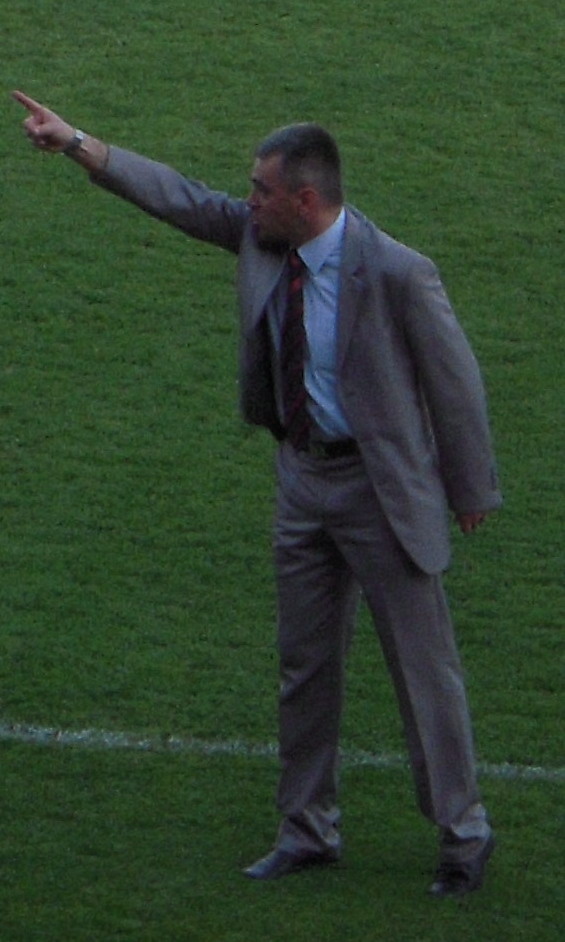
- Jagodić as Borac Banja Luka manager in 2009

Personal information
- Full name: Vlado Jagodić
- Date of birth: 22 March 1964 (age 62)
- Place of birth: Gradiška, SFR Yugoslavia
- Positions: Striker; defender

Team information
- Current team: Potkozarje Aleksandrovac

Senior career*
Years	Team	Apps	(Gls)
- Zadrugar Kočićevo
- Lijevče Nova Topola
- Sloga DIPO Gornji Podgradci
- Laktaši
- BSK Banja Luka
- Rudar Ljubija
- Kozara Gradiška
1992–2001	Borac Banja Luka	253	(86)
2001–2002	Morava Ćuprija		

International career
1992	Republika Srpska	1	(0)

Managerial career
- 2002–2007: Laktaši
- 2008–2009: Borac Banja Luka
- 2009–2010: Ljubić Prnjavor
- 2010–2011: Borac Banja Luka
- 2011–2014: Bosnia and Herzegovina U21
- 2011–2012: Kozara Gradiška
- 2012–2013: Čelik Zenica
- 2015: Borac Banja Luka
- 2016: Borac Banja Luka
- 2016–2017: Sloboda Tuzla
- 2017–2018: Javor Ivanjica
- 2018–2019: Jedinstvo Bihać
- 2019: Zvijezda Gradačac
- 2020: Laktaši
- 2020: Borac Banja Luka
- 2021: Radnik Bijeljina
- 2022: Titograd
- 2023–2024: Sloga Doboj
- 2025: Leotar
- 2025–2026: Kozara Gradiška
- 2026–: Potkozarje Aleksandrovac
- * Club domestic league appearances and goals

Vlado Jagodić (Serbian Cyrillic: Владо Јагодић; born 22 March 1964) is a Bosnian professional football manager and former player who is the manager of First League of the Republika Srpska club Potkozarje Aleksandrovac.

== Club career ==
Born in Gradiška, SFR Yugoslavia, Jagodić played with lower-league Bosnian clubs Zadrugar Kočićevo, Lijevče Nova Topola, Sloga DIPO Gornji Podgradci, Laktaši, BSK Banja Luka, Rudar Prijedor and Kozara Gradiška, before joining Borac Banja Luka in 1992 and playing with them in the First League of FR Yugoslavia as Borac was stationed in Serbia at the time because of the Bosnian War. Later he also played with Serbian side Morava Ćuprija after leaving Borac in 2001. During his career at Borac, Jagodić played in 253 league matches and scored 86 goals.

Although he played briefly as a defender, Jagodić spent the majority of his career as a striker.

== International career ==
In 1992, Jagodić was a part of the Republika Srpska official football team. He made one appearance for the team in 1992.

== Refereeing career ==
Parallel with his playing and managerial career, Jagodić was a successful referee starting in the refereeing system of SFR Yugoslavia. He got his first refereeing license in 1984 followed by a republic-level license in 1986 and a federal license in 1990. Later on, he was placed on the FIFA's Referees List and was a licensed futsal referee from 2002 to 2006.

He refereed during the inaugural two seasons of the joint Bosnian Premier League, 2002–03 and 2003–04. After the match between Orašje and Sarajevo, he was removed from the refereeing list without explanation.

== Managerial career ==
=== Laktaši ===
Jagodić was the mastermind behind the rise of Laktaši through the leagues during the 2000s. He took over as the manager of the club in the winter break of the 2002–03 season when Laktaši were competing in the Third League of RS - West, 4th tier of the Bosnia and Herzegovina football pyramid. In only a few months, the club managed to win their league and was promoted to the 3rd tier, Second League of RS - West.

The next season in the upper tier proved to be even more impressive when Jagodić led the club to another title and achieved promotion to the First League of RS.

During the next few seasons, Laktaši found themselves in the middle of the table until finally winning the First League of RS in the 2006–07 season and reaching promotion to the Bosnian Premier League, the top national tier.

Jagodić's ambition continued in the top flight in the 2007–08 season where Laktaši continued with several good performances. However, he was sacked from his post in December 2007. According to the club's official statement, his contract was terminated due to inappropriate comments in the media.

During his 5-year tenure at the club, he achieved three promotions by winning three titles where he led the club from the 4th to the top tier.

=== Borac Banja Luka ===
Jagodić was named as the new sporting director of Borac Banja Luka in January 2008.

However, after Milomir Odović was sacked from the manager position at Borac in September 2008, Jagodić was promoted to that position from his role of sporting director. During the 2008–09 season, Borac played well under Jagodić, eventually finishing fifth. However, much to the surprise of everyone, Jagodić was relieved of his duties in June 2009 after failed renegotiations of his contract.

=== Ljubić ===
Ljubić Prnjavor named Jagodić as their manager in October 2009 hoping that he can save them from relegation from the First League of RS. Although he recorded some good results, he failed to avoid relegation and left the club after he was offered the manager position back in Borac.

=== Return to Borac ===
Jagodić rejoined Borac in August 2010 after a poor start to the season with the previous manager. He remained on the bench for the whole season and although he managed to win the Bosnian Premier League in that 2010–11 season, the club decided not to extend his contract. He left the club in June 2011 and concentrated on his position in the Bosnia and Herzegovina U21 national team.

=== Bosnia and Herzegovina U21 ===
Towards the end of his tenure in Borac, he took over the Bosnia and Herzegovina U21 team. After a successful campaign where Bosnia & Herzegovina narrowly missed the play-offs, his contract was extended in September 2012 for another qualification cycle.

=== Kozara Gradiška ===
Since the Bosnian FA made a recommendation that the U21 national team manager should also manage a club in order to track players more efficiently, Jagodić took over as the manager of Kozara Gradiška for the 2011–12 season. Although he did manage to record some good results, at the end he failed to save them from relegation and resigned from his position shortly after the start of the second part of the season.

During his tenure at Kozara, Jagodić was given the award of "Best coach of Republika Srpska of 2011" by the Republika Srpska FA and Sportski žurnal, mainly due to his success at Borac.

=== Čelik Zenica ===
In June 2012, Jagodić took over the manager position at Čelik Zenica. He was sacked on 30 October 2013 and got replaced by Nizah Hukić.

=== Mediterranean Games ===
Jagodić took charge of the Bosnian team playing in the 2013 Mediterranean Games. Bosnia and Herzegovina finished the tournament in 5th place.

=== Borac and Sloboda Tuzla ===
On 10 October 2016, Jagodić left Borac after again returning to the club earlier that year. The next day, on 11 October, he was unveiled as the new manager of Sloboda Tuzla. Jagodić managed Sloboda until September 2017.

=== Javor Ivanjica ===
Jagodić was officially announced as the new manager of Javor Ivanjica on 22 September 2017, in what is his first spell as a manager in Serbia. In May 2018, with the agreement of the board of directors of Javor Ivanjica, he left the club.

=== Jedinstvo Bihać ===
On 24 June 2018, it was announced that Jagodić became the new manager of First League of FBiH club Jedinstvo Bihać. His first win as Jedinstvo's manager came on 11 August 2018, in a 1–0 home league win against Bosna Visoko.

Even though there were big things planned for the 2018–19 season, Jedinstvo ultimately finished on 8th place, with bad results in mid-season most probably costing them a better league finish. On 15 September 2019, Jagodić got sacked after making poor results with the club in the early stages of the 2019–20 season.

=== Zvijezda Gradačac ===
Jagodić became the new manager of Zvijezda Gradačac on 9 October 2019. His first game as Zvijezda manager saw the club tie 1–1 against Radnik Hadžići away on 13 October 2019. He got sacked on 28 October 2019, after winning only one point of the possible nine in three games.

=== Return to Laktaši ===
Jagodić decided to come back to Laktaši after over twelve years on 11 February 2020. However, he left the club less than a month later, in March 2020, in order to return to the managerial position of Borac Banja Luka.

=== New return to Borac ===
On 5 March 2020, it was announced that Jagodić had returned to Borac Banja Luka once again, signing a contract lasting until the end of the 2019–20 Bosnian Premier League season. In his first game back, Jagodić's team lost against Velež Mostar 2–1 in a league match on 8 March 2020. He was let go by the club on 21 December 2020.

=== Radnik Bijeljina ===
Exactly four months after being let go by Borac, Jagodić was named as Radnik Bijeljina's new manager on 21 April 2021. In his first game as manager, Radnik lost against Tuzla City on 25 April. Jagodić's first win as Radnik Bijeljina manager came on 16 May 2021, in a league game against Olimpik. After a horrendous start to the 2021–22 season, he was sacked on 25 October 2021.

== Managerial statistics ==
As of match played 7 March 2026

Managerial record by team and tenure
Team	From	To	Record				
Team	From	To	G	W	D	L	Win %
Borac Banja Luka	16 September 2008	11 June 2009	24	14	3	7	58.33
Borac Banja Luka	3 August 2010	4 June 2011	30	19	7	4	63.33
Bosnia and Herzegovina U21	10 May 2011	1 October 2014	25	9	5	11	36.00
Kozara Gradiška	20 September 2011	29 April 2012	17	2	5	10	11.76
Čelik Zenica	22 June 2012	25 October 2013	49	21	18	10	42.86
Borac Banja Luka	27 March 2015	1 September 2015	20	5	7	8	25.00
Borac Banja Luka	23 August 2016	10 October 2016	8	5	2	1	62.50
Sloboda Tuzla	11 October 2016	10 September 2017	30	9	8	13	30.00
Javor Ivanjica	22 September 2017	7 May 2018	27	9	4	14	33.33
Jedinstvo Bihać	25 June 2018	16 September 2019	36	14	5	17	38.89
Zvijezda Gradačac	9 October 2019	28 October 2019	3	0	1	2	0.00
Laktaši	11 February 2020	4 March 2020	0	0	0	0	—
Borac Banja Luka	5 March 2020	21 December 2020	24	13	2	9	54.17
Radnik Bijeljina	21 April 2021	25 October 2021	22	3	5	14	13.64
Titograd	29 January 2022	31 August 2022	17	4	4	9	23.53
Sloga Doboj	23 March 2023	25 September 2024	56	21	9	26	37.50
Leotar	26 January 2025	21 July 2025	17	5	5	7	29.41
Kozara Gradiška	29 September 2025	Present	8	4	1	3	50.00
Total			413	157	91	165	38.01

== Honours ==
=== Manager ===
Laktaši

- First League of RS: 2006–07
- Second League of RS: 2003–04 (West)

Borac Banja Luka

- Bosnian Premier League: 2010–11
