= Darko Nestorović =

Bosnian football manager (born 1965)

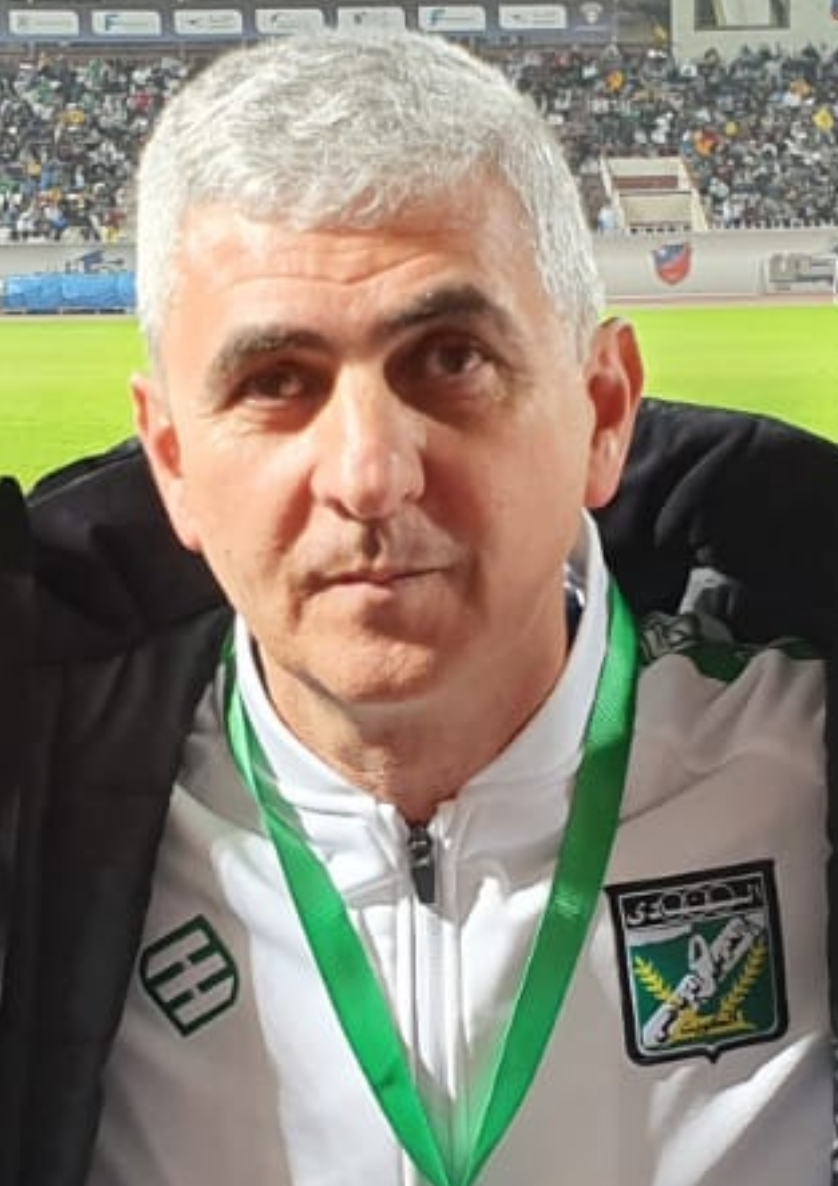
- Nestorović in 2020

Personal information
- Date of birth: 4 April 1965 (age 61)
- Place of birth: Kakanj, SFR Yugoslavia
- Position: Forward

Senior career*
Years	Team	Apps	(Gls)
1985–1989	Čelik Zenica	111	(32)
1989–1990	Rad	15	(3)
1990–1991	Rijeka	24	(2)
1991–1992	Panserraikos	19	(1)
1992–1993	Mogren	33	(9)
1994–1995	Spartak Subotica	37	(8)
1995	HamKam	10	(4)
1997	Hong Kong Golden		
1999	Umeå	7	(1)
Total		256	(60)

Managerial career
- 2002–2004: Radnik Bijeljina
- 2004–2005: Drina Zvornik
- 2006–2010: Rudar Prijedor
- 2010–2011: Sloboda Mrkonjić Grad
- 2011–2013: Radnik Bijeljina
- 2013–2014: Sutjeska Foča
- 2014-2015: Rudar Prijedor
- 2015–2017: Bosnia and Herzegovina U21
- 2017: Al-Arabi (co-trainer)
- 2018–2019: Zvijezda 09
- 2019–2020: Al-Arabi
- 2020–2021: Radnik Bijeljina
- 2021–2022: Kazma
- 2023: Al-Wehdat
- 2023–2024: Al-Arabi
- 2024: Emirates Club
- 2024–2025: Al-Jubail
- 2025: Al-Wehdat
- * Club domestic league appearances and goals

Darko Nestorović (Serbian Cyrillic: Дарко Несторовић; born 4 April 1965) is a Bosnian professional football manager.

== Playing career ==
Born in Kakanj, SR Bosnia and Herzegovina, Nestorović played for Čelik Zenica, Rad and Rijeka in the former SFR Yugoslavia.

After Rijeka and the breakup of Yugoslavia, he played abroad for Panserraikos in the Greek First Division, HamKam in the first league of Norway, Hong Kong Golden in the first league of China, FC Umea in the first league of Sweden. In the first league of Serbia and Montenegro, he played for FK Spartak Subotica and FK Mogren. In his playing career, he was a representative of all national teams of Bosnia and Herzegovina and a youth representative of Yugoslavia in the generation of Darko Pančev, Dragan Stojković, Mitar Mrkela, Aleksandar Stojanović, and with that generation he qualified for the European Championship. He also remained as Celik's all-time top scorer. He played in the UEFA Cup with FK Rad and was the scorer in a 2–1 victory over Olympiacos in Belgrade. Abroad, he was a member of the Hong Kong national team.

== Managerial career ==
After ending his playing career, Nestorović stayed in football as a professional manager, starting off at Radnik Bijeljina. After Radnik, he managed Drina Zvornik then Rudar Prijedor.

With Rudar Prijedor, Nestorović achieved the greatest success in the history of the club. In three seasons, he introduced a team from the second league to the first league, and the following year to the premier league of Bosnia and Herzegovina. With the same players, he was in the middle of the Premier League table. He was twice chosen as the best coach of the year in the selection of Sportski žurnal, as well as by his fellow coaches. Then he managed Sloboda Mrkonjić Grad, Radnik Bijeljina, who he promoted to the Bosnian Premier League by winning the 2011–12 First League of RS.

While at Radnik Bijeljina, Nestorović was coach of the Bosnia and Herzegovina U23 Olympic national team, Sutjeska Foča and Rudar, before becoming head coach of the Bosnia and Herzegovina U21 national team on 27 December 2014. Nestorović stayed as head coach until 10 mart 2017.

He then became manager of Kuwait Premier League club Al-Arabi on 13 August 2017, working alongside Kuwaiti manager Mohammed Ebrahim Hajeyah. On 5 September 2018, he became the new manager of newly promoted Bosnian Premier League club Zvijzeda 09.

Nestorović took over the team that was last in the standings with only three points and that everyone had already seen in the second league. In a very short period, he stabilized the team and with five consecutive victories in the championship led the team to the sixth place in the table and saved relegation. Even after making decent results with the club, Nestorović decided to leave Zvijezda on 11 March 2019. On 6 September 2019, he returned to Al-Arabi. Nestorović took over Al Arabi, who were also last in the Kuwait First League table and were in a very difficult situation. He eventually managed to lead the team to third place and also played with Al Arabi in the final of the Prince Cup and was first in the League Cup. Al Arabi played the most beautiful football in Kuwait during that period.

Nestorović once again became manager of Radnik Bijeljina on 24 November 2020. On 16 April 2021, he decided to resign as manager of Radnik for private reasons. On 14 June 2021, Nestorović became the coach of Kazma, another club in the Kuwait Premier League.

In March 2023, he became the head coach of Jordanian side Al-Wehdat, winning the Jordan Super Cup with the club. He later returned to manage Al-Arabi during the 2023–24 season. He was dismissed in April 2024.

On 16 November 2024, Nestorović was appointed as manager of Saudi First Division League club Al-Jubail. He was sacked on 8 April 2025.

In August 2025, he returned to coach Al-Wehdat for a second tenure. He was sacked a month later following a 4–0 defeat against Al-Muharraq in their opening match of the AFC Champions League Two.

== Managerial statistics ==
As of 5 September 2025

Team	Nat	From	To	Record							
Team	Nat	From	To	P	W	D	L	GF	GA	GD	W%
Bosnia and Herzegovina U21	(Bosnia and Herzegovina)	27 December 2014	10 March 2017	13	2	5	6	8	19	−11	15.38
Al-Arabi	(Kuwait)	13 August 2017	31 December 2017	13	4	4	5	19	18	+1	30.77
Zvijezda 09	(Bosnia and Herzegovina)	5 September 2018	11 March 2019	16	6	5	5	13	13	+0	37.50
Al-Arabi	(Kuwait)	3 September 2019	30 June 2020	26	14	4	8	39	28	+11	53.85
Radnik Bijeljina	(Bosnia and Herzegovina)	24 November 2020	16 April 2021	10	2	3	5	10	16	−6	20.00
Kazma	(Kuwait)	1 August 2021	21 February 2022	20	10	5	5	28	17	+11	50.00
Al-Wehdat	(Jordan)	19 March 2023	17 August 2023	16	10	4	2	18	12	+6	62.50
Al-Arabi	(Kuwait)	3 November 2023	1 April 2024	20	13	4	3	45	18	+27	65.00
Emirates Club	(United Arab Emirates)	27 July 2024	29 September 2024	2	0	0	2	0	4	−4	0.00
Al-Jubail	(Saudi Arabia)	16 November 2024	8 April 2025	17	3	8	6	18	26	−8	17.65
Al-Wehdat	(Jordan)	2 August 2025	Present	6	3	2	1	8	5	+3	50.00
Total				159	67	44	48	206	176	+30	42.14

== Honours ==
=== Manager ===
Rudar Prijedor

- Second League of RS: 2007-08
- First League of RS: 2008–09

Radnik Bijeljina

- First League of RS: 2011–12

AL-Wehdat SC

- Jordan Super Cup: 2023
