= 2005–06 First League of the Republika Srpska =

The First League of the Republika Srpska 2005–06 was the 11th since its establishment.

== Teams ==
- Borac Banja Luka
- BSK Crni Đorđe Banja Luka
- Drina Zvornik
- Famos Vojkovići
- Glasinac Sokolac
- Jedinstvo Brčko
- Kozara Gradiška
- Laktaši
- Ljubić Prnjavor
- Mladost Gacko
- Nikos Kanbera Rudanka
- Rudar Prijedor
- Rudar Ugljevik
- Sloboda Novi Grad
- Sloga Doboj
- Sloga Trn

== League table ==
Pos	Team	Pld	W	D	L	GF	GA	GD	Pts	Promotion or relegation
1	Borac Banja Luka (C, P)	30	19	5	6	50	19	+31	62	Promotion to Premijer Liga BiH
2	Ljubić Prnjavor	30	16	5	9	45	28	+17	53	
3	Drina Zvornik	30	15	5	10	39	28	+11	50	
4	Kozara Gradiška	30	14	5	11	37	33	+4	47	
5	BSK Crni Đorđe	30	14	5	11	34	36	−2	47	
6	Rudar Prijedor	30	14	2	14	36	39	−3	44	
7	Glasinac Sokolac	30	12	7	11	32	28	+4	43	
8	Sloga Doboj	30	13	4	13	37	31	+6	43	
9	Mladost Gacko	30	14	1	15	39	43	−4	43	
10	Rudar Ugljevik	30	12	7	11	40	34	+6	43	
11	Jedinstvo Brčko	30	11	7	12	38	38	0	40	
12	Sloboda Novi Grad	30	13	1	16	36	49	−13	40	
13	Laktaši	30	12	3	15	44	49	−5	39	
14	Famos Vojkovići	30	11	6	13	32	35	−3	39	
15	Sloga Trn (R)	30	9	7	14	27	37	−10	34	Relegation to Second League RS
16	Nikos Kanbera (R)	30	4	4	22	18	57	−39	16	Relegation to Second League RS

Source: SportDC
Rules for classification: 1) points; 2) goal difference; 3) number of goals scored.
(C) Champions; (P) Promoted; (R) Relegated
