= 2009–10 First League of the Republika Srpska =

First League of the Republika Srpska
- Season: 2009–10
- Champions: Drina (Z); 1st First League title
- Promoted: Drina (Z)
- Relegated: Romanija; Ljubić; Sloga (T)
- Matches played: 182
- Goals scored: 437 (2.4 per match)
- Top goalscorer: Filip Vujić (14 goals)

The 2009–10 First League of the Republika Srpska was the 15th since its establishment.

== Teams ==
- BSK Banja Luka
- Drina Zvornik
- Drina HE Višegrad
- Famos Vojkovići
- Kozara Gradiška
- Ljubić Prnjavor
- Mladost Gacko
- Proleter Teslić
- Radnik Bijeljina
- Romanija Pale
- Sloboda Novi Grad
- Sloga Doboj
- Sloga Trn
- Sutjeska Foča

== League table ==
Pos	Team	Pld	W	D	L	GF	GA	GD	Pts	Promotion or relegation
1	Drina Zvornik (C, P)	26	12	11	3	39	18	+21	47	Promotion to Premijer Liga BiH
2	Radnik Bijeljina	26	12	7	7	47	32	+15	43	
3	BSK Banja Luka	26	11	6	9	34	26	+8	39	
4	Proleter Teslić	26	9	10	7	27	22	+5	37	
5	Kozara Gradiška	26	9	9	8	36	23	+13	36	
6	Sutjeska Foča	26	9	9	8	31	30	+1	36	
7	Famos Vojkovići	26	10	5	11	29	34	−5	35	
8	Sloboda Novi Grad	26	9	8	9	29	28	+1	35	
9	Sloga Doboj	26	9	8	9	27	25	+2	35	
10	Mladost Gacko	26	10	5	11	31	43	−12	35	
11	Drina HE Višegrad	26	8	10	8	28	31	−3	34	
12	Romanija Pale (R)	26	8	8	10	32	33	−1	32	Qualification to the relegation play-off
13	Ljubić Prnjavor (R)	26	6	7	13	26	52	−26	25	Relegation to Second League RS
14	Sloga Trn (R)	26	4	9	13	25	44	−19	21	Relegation to Second League RS

Source: SportDC
Rules for classification: 1st points; 2nd goal difference; 3rd goals scored
For deciding champions, qualification to higher rank and relegation: 1st points; 2nd head-to-head points; 3rd head-to-head goal difference; 4th head-to-head goals scored; 5th head-to-head away goals scored; 6th goal difference; 7th goals scored
(C) Champions; (P) Promoted; (R) Relegated

== Relegation play-offs ==
Team 1	Agg.	Team 2	1st leg	2nd leg
Romanija Pale	2–3	Podrinje Janja	1–1	1–2
