= 1997–98 First League of the Republika Srpska =

The 1997–98 First League of the Republika Srpska was the 3rd season since establishment. Since the Football Association of Republika Srpska is not a member of UEFA nor FIFA, the league champion did not qualify for a European tournament.

== League table ==
Pos	Team	Pld	W	D	L	GF	GA	GD	Pts	Relegation
1	Rudar Ugljevik (C)	34	19	7	8	61	25	+36	64	
2	Borac Banja Luka	34	18	4	12	58	34	+24	58	
3	Glasinac	34	15	12	7	56	41	+15	57	
4	Radnik	34	16	6	12	61	36	+25	54	
5	Leotar	34	16	5	13	54	52	+2	53	
6	Drina Zvornik	34	15	6	13	60	48	+12	51	
7	Omladinac	34	16	3	15	45	55	−10	51	
8	Boksit	34	13	10	11	50	35	+15	49	
9	Sarajevo (East)	34	14	7	13	49	44	+5	49	
10	Kozara	34	15	3	16	47	41	+6	48	
11	Sloboda Novi Grad	34	14	6	14	44	46	−2	48	
12	Sloga Trn	34	14	4	16	58	53	+5	46	
13	Borac Šamac	34	13	7	14	46	49	−3	46	
14	Rudar Prijedor	34	12	8	14	33	42	−9	44 (Note: RPR: 7 pts; MLA: 5 pts; POL: 4 pts)	
15	Mladost Rogatica (R)	34	13	5	16	51	63	−12	44	Relegation to Second League RS
16	Polet (R)	34	12	8	14	40	67	−27	44	Relegation to Second League RS
17	Sloga Doboj (R)	34	13	4	17	37	57	−20	43	Relegation to Second League RS
18	Željezničar Lukavica (R)	34	4	3	27	21	83	−62	15	Relegation to Second League RS

Source: BiHSoccer.com, RSSSF.org
Rules for classification: 1) points; 2) goal difference; 3) number of goals scored.
(C) Champions; (R) Relegated

== See also ==
- 1997–98 First League of Bosnia and Herzegovina
