= Ognjen Škorić =

Bosnian footballer (born 1993)

Personal information
- Full name: Ognjen Škorić
- Date of birth: 2 March 1993 (age 33)
- Place of birth: Gradiška, Bosnia and Herzegovina
- Height: 1.81 m (5 ft 11 in)
- Position: Winger

Team information
- Current team: Kozara Gradiška
- Number: 10

Youth career
- Kozara Gradiška

Senior career*
Years	Team	Apps	(Gls)
2011–2012	Kozara Gradiška	9	(0)
2013	Donji Srem	14	(1)
2013–2014	Kozara Gradiška		
2015	Radnik Bijeljina	0	(0)
2015	Tekstilac Derventa	12	(1)
2016	Borac Banja Luka	13	(0)
2017	Kozara Gradiška	14	(3)
2017–2022	Jedinstvo Žeravica		
2022–2026	Laktaši	123	(37)
2026–	Kozara Gradiška	2	(0)

International career
2009	Bosnia and Herzegovina U-17		
- * Club domestic league appearances and goals as of 25 February 2015

Ognjen Škorić (Serbian Cyrillic: Огњен Шкорић; born 2 March 1993) is a Bosnian footballer who plays for Kozara Gradiška in the First League of the Republika Srpska.

== Club career ==
Born in Gradiška, Bosnia and Herzegovina, after playing with FK Kozara Gradiška in the 2011–12 Premier League of Bosnia and Herzegovina, in January 2013 Škorić signed with FK Donji Srem and played with them in the 2012–13 Serbian SuperLiga.

In January 2015, after making a good first half of the 2014–15 season with Kozara, Škorić signed with Bosnian Premier League side FK Radnik Bijeljina.

He rejoined Kozara from Borac Banja Luka in January 2017.

== International career ==
In 2009 Škorić played for Bosnia and Herzegovina U-17 team.

More recently, in 2014, Ognjen Škorić was part of the Republika Srpska national under-23 football team.
