= 2023–24 First League of the Republika Srpska =

First League of the Republika Srpska
- Season: 2023–24
- Dates: 12 August 2023 – 2 June 2024
- Champions: Radnik Bijeljina; 4th First League title
- Promoted: Radnik Bijeljina
- Relegated: Alfa Modriča; Omarska
- Matches: 306
- Goals: 842 (2.75 per match)
- Top goalscorer: Milan Šikanjić (26 goals)

The 2023–24 First League of the Republika Srpska was the twenty-ninth season of the First League of the Republika Srpska, the second tier football league of Bosnia and Herzegovina, since its original establishment and the twenty-second as a second-tier league. The season began on 12 August 2023 and ended on 2 June 2024.

== Teams ==
- Borac Kozarska Dubica
- BSK Banja Luka
- Drina Zvornik
- Famos Vojkovići
- Kozara Gradiška
- Laktaši
- Leotar
- Ljubić Prnjavor
- Modriča
- Omarska
- Radnik Bijeljina
- Rudar Prijedor
- Slavija Sarajevo
- Sloboda Mrkonjić Grad
- Sloboda Novi Grad
- Sutjeska Foča
- Velež Nevesinje
- Željezničar Banja Luka

== League table ==
Pos	Team	Pld	W	D	L	GF	GA	GD	Pts	Promotion or relegation
1	Radnik Bijeljina (C, P)	34	21	11	2	63	19	+44	74	Promotion to the Premijer Liga BIH
2	Laktaši	34	21	4	9	71	30	+41	67	
3	Rudar Prijedor	34	16	11	7	59	28	+31	59	
4	Leotar	34	17	3	14	46	45	+1	54	
5	Željezničar Banja Luka	34	16	4	14	53	43	+10	52	
6	Famos Vojkovići	34	15	6	13	48	45	+3	51	
7	Kozara	34	13	8	13	52	52	0	47	
8	Sloboda Mrkonjić Grad	34	13	6	15	44	45	−1	45	
9	Slavija	34	13	6	15	41	44	−3	45	
10	Sutjeska Foča	34	13	6	15	36	47	−11	45	
11	Ljubić Prnjavor	34	14	3	17	38	52	−14	45	
12	Velež Nevesinje	34	14	3	17	50	65	−15	45	
13	BSK Banja Luka	34	13	5	16	52	46	+6	44	
14	Drina Zvornik	34	11	11	12	38	37	+1	44	
15	Borac Kozarska Dubica	34	12	7	15	44	57	−13	43	
16	Romanija Pale	34	13	4	17	38	58	−20	43	
17	Alfa Modriča (R)	34	11	6	17	37	57	−20	39	Relegation to the Second League RS
18	Omarska (R)	34	6	4	24	32	72	−40	22	Relegation to the Second League RS

Source: SportDC
Rules for classification: 1) Points; 2) Head-to-head points; 3) Head-to-head goal difference; 4) Head-to-head goals scored; 5) Head-to-head away goals scored (only if two teams); 6) Goal difference; 7) Goals scored; 8) Play-off.
(C) Champions; (P) Promoted; (R) Relegated

== See also ==
- 2023–24 Premier League of Bosnia and Herzegovina
- 2023–24 First League of the Federation of Bosnia and Herzegovina
- 2023–24 Bosnia and Herzegovina Football Cup
