= 2006–07 First League of the Republika Srpska =

The First League of the Republika Srpska 2006–07 was the 12th since its establishment.

== Teams ==
- Borac Šamac
- BSK Nektar Banja Luka
- Drina Zvornik
- Drina HE Višegrad
- Famos Vojkovići
- Glasinac Sokolac
- Jedinstvo Brčko
- Kozara Gradiška
- Laktaši
- Ljubić Prnjavor
- Mladost Gacko
- Omladinac Mobi'S Banja Luka
- Rudar Prijedor
- Rudar Ugljevik
- Sloboda Novi Grad
- Sloga Doboj

== League table ==
Pos	Team	Pld	W	D	L	GF	GA	GD	Pts	Promotion or relegation
1	Laktaši (C)	30	17	8	5	45	21	+24	59	Promotion to Premijer Liga BiH
2	Borac Šamac	30	16	7	7	61	32	+29	55	
3	Rudar Ugljevik	30	13	8	9	35	24	+11	47	
4	Sloga Doboj	30	13	6	11	33	34	−1	45	
5	Ljubić Prnjavor	30	14	3	13	30	37	−7	45	
6	Drina HE Višegrad	30	14	2	14	42	36	+6	44	
7	Kozara Gradiška	30	13	4	13	41	38	+3	43	
8	Sloboda Novi Grad	30	13	4	13	49	43	+6	43	
9	Famos Vojkovići	30	13	4	13	37	36	+1	43	
10	BSK Nektar	30	11	9	10	32	33	−1	42	
11	Mladost Gacko	30	13	3	14	41	41	0	42	
12	Drina Zvornik	30	13	7	10	41	21	+20	46	
13	Rudar Prijedor (R)	30	13	1	16	36	41	−5	40	Relegation to Second League RS
14	Jedinstvo Brčko (R)	30	11	7	12	27	35	−8	40	Relegation to Second League RS
15	Glasinac Sokolac (R)	30	14	2	14	34	35	−1	44	Relegation to Second League RS
16	Omladinac Banja Luka (R)	30	1	1	28	20	97	−77	4	Relegation to Second League RS

Source: SportDC
Rules for classification: 1) points; 2) goal difference; 3) number of goals scored.
(C) Champions; (R) Relegated
