= FK Drina HE Višegrad =

Drina HE Višegrad
- Full name: Fudbalski klub Drina HE Višegrad
- Founded: 1924; 102 years ago
- Ground: Gradski stadion, Višegrad
- Capacity: 4.000
- Chairman: Predrag Grozdanović
- League: First League of RS
- 2023–24: Second League RS - East, 1st (promoted)
Home colours	Away colours

Fudbalski klub Drina HE Višegrad (Serbian Cyrillic: Фудбалски клуб Дpинa XE Bишeгpaд) is a professional Bosnian Serb football club from the town of Višegrad, in Republika Srpska, Bosnia and Herzegovina.

The club competed for more than ten years in the First League of the Republika Srpska, finishing in an all-time high 5th place in the 2013-14 season. However, due to poor results Drina was relegated to the Second League of RS – East, a third-tier competition in Bosnia and Herzegovina. Season 23/24 was successful for the club, and after eight years in 2nd division, they won a title and were promoted to the First League of the Republika Srpska again from the 24/25 season.

== Club seasons ==
Season	League									Cup	Europe
Season	Division	P	W	D	L	F	A	Pts	Pos	Cup	Europe
Current format of Premier League of Bosnia and Herzegovina
2002–03	First League of the Republika Srpska	28	11	3	14	30	28	36	9th		
2003–04	First League of the Republika Srpska	30	13	2	15	33	39	41	11th		
2004–05	First League of the Republika Srpska	30	13	3	14	35	33	42	13th ↓		
2005–06	Second League of RS – East								?th ↑		
2006–07	First League of the Republika Srpska	30	14	2	14	42	36	44	6th		
2007–08	First League of the Republika Srpska	30	13	2	15	38	48	41	10th		
2008–09	First League of the Republika Srpska	30	11	6	13	27	44	39	10th		
2009–10	First League of the Republika Srpska	26	8	10	8	28	31	34	11th		
2010–11	First League of the Republika Srpska	26	8	5	13	27	36	29	12th		
2011–12	First League of the Republika Srpska	26	10	6	10	22	25	36	7th		
2012–13	First League of the Republika Srpska	26	11	4	11	29	31	37	6th		
2013–14	First League of the Republika Srpska	26	12	4	10	42	34	40	5th		
2014–15	First League of the Republika Srpska	26	8	6	12	29	37	29	10th		
2015–16	First League of the Republika Srpska	22	5	3	14	15	36	18	11th ↓		
2016–17	Second League of RS – East	30	9	3	18	32	54	30	15th	1/16 Mladost - Drina HE 7-1	
2017–18	Second League of RS – East	30	12	4	14	41	46	40	9th		
2018–19	Second League of RS – East	27	11	4	12	40	37	37	5th		
2019–20	Second League of RS – East	16	5	2	9	22	28	17	14th	1/16 Rudar - Drina HE 3-2	
2020–21	Second League of RS – East	18	9	3	6	31	23	30	3rd		
2021–22	Second League of RS – East	30	11	5	14	57	65	38	10th		
2022–23	Second League of RS – East	30	11	6	13	54	54	39	10th		
2023–24	Second League of RS – East	30	24	4	2	91	26	76	1st		
2024–25	First League of the Republika Srpska	34	13	3	18	37	59	42	14th	1/16 Drina HE - Leotar 1-3	
2025–26	Second League of RS – East	0	0	0	0	0	0	0	NA		

== Players ==
=== Current squad 2024/25 ===
Note: Flags indicate national team as defined under FIFA eligibility rules; some limited exceptions apply. Players may hold more than one non-FIFA nationality.

No.	Pos.	Nation	Player
—	GK	BIH	Filip Cuca
—	GK	SRB	Petar Nikić
—	GK	SRB	Nikola Simonović
—	DEF	BIH	Miloš Pejović
—	DEF	BIH	Nikola Todorović
—	DEF	BIH	Luka Pljevaljčić
—	DEF	SRB	Lazar Kilibarda
—	DEF	MNE	Lazar Pajović
—	DEF	SRB	Srđan Pavlović
—	DEF	BIH	Srđan Ćirković
—	DEF	KOR	Tae-kwan Oh

No.	Pos.	Nation	Player
—	MID	BIH	Aleksandar Grujić
—	MID	KOR	Jeong Sangwon
—	MID	JPN	Yuto Nakamoto
—	MID	MNE	Danilo Dragićević
—	MID	ARG	Lucas Nahuel Ojeda
—	ST	BIH	Luka Radović
—	ST	BIH	Dalibor Damjanović
—	ST	BIH	Stefan Terzić
—	ST	SRB	Zehrudin Mehmedović

=== Top scorers in 2023/24 ===
Place	Player	Goals
1	Dalibor Damjanović	23
2	Luka Vulević	13
3	Nebojša Sekulić	11

=== Top scorers in 2024/25 ===
Place	Player	Goals
1	Dalibor Damjanović	13
2	Lazar Pajović	3
2	Marko Vuković	3
3	Ojeda Lucas	2

== Former players ==
=== Former players ===
Note: Flags indicate national team as defined under FIFA eligibility rules; some limited exceptions apply. Players may hold more than one non-FIFA nationality.

No.	Pos.	Nation	Player
—	GK	BIH	Nemanja Bojanović
—	ST	BIH	Gedeon Guzina
—	DEF	BIH	Miloš Nikolić
—	MID	BIH	Nikola Bjeloš
—	DEF	BIH	Marko Mitrašinović
—	MID	SRB	Luka Vulević
—	GK	CAN	Obrad Bejatović
—	ST	SRB	Konstantin Ristović
—	MID	BIH	Stefan Pljevaljčić
—	MID	BIH	Marko Šušnjar

No.	Pos.	Nation	Player
—	DEF	BIH	Bojan Marković
—	DEF	BIH	Mirko Stanojčić
—	DEF	BIH	Igor Šimšić
—	DEF	SRB	Dejan Tasić
—	DEF	BIH	Nebojša Sekulić
—	ST	BIH	Đorđe Okuka
—	MID	BIH	Sergej Lozo
—	ST	MNE	Marko Vuković

== External sources ==
- Drina HE on at SportDC
- Drina HE on at FSRS
- Drina HE on at SofaScore
- Od Gardijanove liste najvećih svetskih talenata do Drine iz Višegrada at Mozzartsport
- Bivši selektor Srbije novi trener Drine HE at Meridiansport.ba
