= 2004–05 First League of the Republika Srpska =

The First League of the Republika Srpska 2004-05 was the 10th since its establishment.

== Teams ==
- BSK Crni Đorđe Banja Luka
- Drina Zvornik
- Drina HE Višegrad
- Glasinac Sokolac
- Hercegovac Bileća
- Jedinstvo Brčko
- Kozara Gradiška
- Laktaši
- Ljubić Prnjavor
- Lokomotiva Brčko
- Mladost Gacko
- Napredak Donji Šepak
- Radnik Bijeljina
- Rudar Prijedor
- Sloboda Novi Grad
- Sloga Doboj

== League table ==
Pos	Team	Pld	W	D	L	GF	GA	GD	Pts	Promotion or relegation
1	Radnik Bijeljina (C, P)	30	20	6	4	58	13	+45	66	Promotion to Premijer Liga BiH
2	Ljubić Prnjavor	30	18	3	9	54	34	+20	57	
3	Kozara Gradiška	30	16	3	11	40	28	+12	51	
4	Mladost Gacko	30	15	3	12	54	35	+19	48	
5	Sloga Doboj	30	15	3	12	34	37	−3	48	
6	Laktaši	30	14	6	10	44	33	+11	48	
7	Drina Zvornik	30	13	6	11	41	32	+9	45	
8	Jedinstvo Brčko	30	14	3	13	32	36	−4	45	
9	BSK Crni Đorđe	30	13	4	13	42	40	+2	43	
10	Rudar Prijedor	30	13	4	13	31	35	−4	43	
11	Glasinac Sokolac	30	13	3	14	38	36	+2	42	
12	Sloboda Novi Grad	30	13	3	14	38	42	−4	42	
13	Drina Višegrad (R)	30	13	3	14	35	33	+2	42	Relegation to Second League RS
14	Napredak Donji Šepak (R)	30	13	2	15	31	33	−2	41	Relegation to Second League RS
15	Lokomotiva Brčko (R)	30	3	6	21	16	55	−39	15	Relegation to Second League RS
16	Hercegovac Bileća (R)	30	3	4	23	21	87	−66	13	Relegation to Second League RS

Source: SportDC
Rules for classification: 1) points; 2) goal difference; 3) number of goals scored.
(C) Champions; (P) Promoted; (R) Relegated
