= FK Drina Zvornik =

Drina Zvornik
- Full name: Fudbalski klub Drina Zvornik
- Founded: 1945
- Ground: Gradski Stadion, Zvornik
- Capacity: 3,000
- Chairman: Jelenko Vasić
- Manager: Mile Lazarević
- League: First League of RS
- 2023–24: First League of RS, 14th
Home colours	Away colours

Fudbalski klub Drina Zvornik (Serbian Cyrillic: Фудбалски клуб Дрина Зворник) is a professional association football club from the city of Zvornik that is situated Bosnia and Herzegovina.

The club competes in the First League of the Republika Srpska and plays its home matches on the Gradski Stadion (City Stadium) in Zvornik, which has a capacity of 3,000 seats.

== History ==
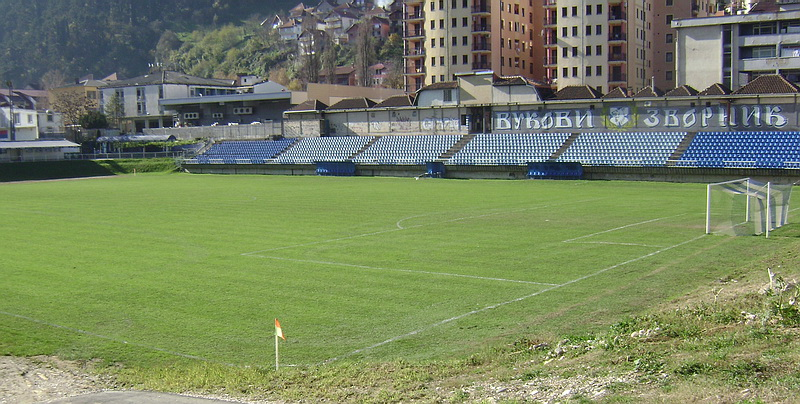
FK Drina Zvornik stadium

Football was first played in Zvornik a little bit after World War I. The first football match was played in 1924 between a team from Zvornik against visitors from Srebrenica. The first football club was formed in 1933 and named Zmaj od Noćaja. It represented the Serb community of the town. A year later, a Bosniak club named Sloga was formed so the city of Zvornik had two football clubs split between ethnic lines during the period of the Kingdom of Yugoslavia, in between the First World War and Second World War. Just before the start of the Second World War the two clubs were dismembered, and a new club named Omladinac was formed.

Just after the end of the Second World War a new club, during the period of SFR Yugoslavia, FK Drina was formed. The first club president was Mr. Nikola Mastilica. The first match recorded by the press and probably the first match in competition was played on 17 May 1946, in Tuzla against FK Sloboda Tuzla. During the period of SFR Yugoslavia the club played mostly in lower national leagues.

During the 1990s, another team from Živinice also represented Drina Zvornik, but played in the Prva Liga Federacije Bosne i Hercegovine. With the break-up of Yugoslavia, in 1992, the Football Association of Republika Srpska was formed. FK Drina Zvornik was a member of the first league season in 1995–96 to be organised by the FAoRS. The league was divided into two groups and the club played in the First League – East. In this first season, the club was relegated, but after only one season the club became champions of the Second League – group Bijeljina, and was promoted into the First League of Republika Srpska in the 1997–98 season. The club suffered a relegation once more but would return to the First League once again in the 2002–03 season, this time staying in the league all the way up until 2010. In the 2009–10 season, the club was league champions, and now being the First League of Republika Srpska part of the Bosnia and Herzegovina league system, the club achieved its greatest result ever and earned a promotion to the Premier League of Bosnia and Herzegovina. But soon after, it was relegated again to the First League of Republika Srpska, after finishing last in the 2010–11 season.

In 2013–14 Drina Zvornik finished first in the First League of Republika Srpska and was then again promoted to the Premier League.

== Club seasons ==
Season	League									Cup	Europe
Season	Division	P	W	D	L	F	A	Pts	Pos	Cup	Europe
1995–96	First League of the Republika Srpska	20	5	5	10	30	38	20	10th ↓		
1996–97	Second League of RS – Bijeljina								1st ↑		
1997–98	First League of the Republika Srpska	34	15	6	13	60	48	51	6th		
1998–99	First League of the Republika Srpska	34	15	5	14	57	49	50	7th		
1999–00	First League of the Republika Srpska	38	16	6	16	50	43	54	14th ↓		
Current format of Premier League of Bosnia and Herzegovina
2000–01	First League of FBiH	15	2	3	10	12	38	9	withdrew		
2002–03	First League of the Republika Srpska	28	8	5	15	29	46	29	13th		
2003–04	First League of the Republika Srpska	30	11	8	11	40	42	41	8th		
2004–05	First League of the Republika Srpska	30	13	6	11	41	32	45	7th		
2005–06	First League of the Republika Srpska	30	15	5	10	39	28	50	3rd		
2006–07	First League of the Republika Srpska	30	13	7	10	41	21	40	12th		
2007–08	First League of the Republika Srpska	30	12	9	9	43	32	45	8th		
2008–09	First League of the Republika Srpska	30	11	6	13	39	36	39	8th		
2009–10	First League of the Republika Srpska	26	12	11	3	39	18	47	1st ↑		
2010–11	Premier League of Bosnia and Herzegovina	30	7	2	21	18	53	23	16th ↓		
2011–12	First League of the Republika Srpska	26	9	6	11	24	23	33	9th		
2012–13	First League of the Republika Srpska	26	9	8	9	39	38	35	10th		
2013–14	First League of the Republika Srpska	26	15	8	3	38	16	53	1st ↑		
2014–15	Premier League of Bosnia and Herzegovina	30	6	9	15	26	40	27	13th		
2015–16	Premier League of Bosnia and Herzegovina	30	7	1	22	25	67	22	15th ↓		
2016–17	First League of the Republika Srpska	22	9	6	7	23	21	33	4th		
2017–18	First League of the Republika Srpska	22	10	8	4	28	18	38	3rd		
2018–19	First League of the Republika Srpska	22	5	7	10	21	28	22	10th		
2019–20	First League of the Republika Srpska	16	10	4	2	38	12	34	2nd		
2020–21	First League of the Republika Srpska	30	10	8	12	39	50	38	13th		

== Honours ==
=== Domestic ===
==== League ====
- First League of the Republika Srpska:
  - Winners (2): 2009–10, 2013–14

== Players ==
=== Current squad ===
As of 14 October 2023

Note: Flags indicate national team as defined under FIFA eligibility rules; some limited exceptions apply. Players may hold more than one non-FIFA nationality.

No.	Pos.	Nation	Player
1	GK	BIH	Branislav Ružić
2	DF	BIH	Savo Veljkić
3	DF	SRB	Pavle Lazić
4	DF	BIH	Filip Blagojević
5	DF	BIH	Boris Andrić
6	MF	SRB	Filip Kojić
7	MF	BIH	Pavle Sušić
8	MF	BIH	Radovan Vasić
9	MF	MKD	Hristijan Denkovski
10	DF	BIH	Sasa Perić
11	FW	SRB	Drago Maksimović

No.	Pos.	Nation	Player
12	GK	BIH	Nebojša Gajić
13	MF	SRB	Luka Samardzija
14	MF	BIH	Danijel Culum
14	MF	BIH	Aleksa Marić
15	MF	BIH	Nikola Stanišić
16	DF	BIH	Ibrahim Hidić
18	MF	BIH	Jovan Novak
20	DF	CAN	Taha Ilyass
—	GK	BIH	David Jevtić
—	MF	BIH	Vladan Jezdić
—	FW	SRB	Jovo Beatović

=== Notable players ===
For the list of former and current players with Wikipedia article, please see Category:FK Drina Zvornik players.

== Coaching staff ==
Manager	(Serbia) Miroslav Milanović
Assistant manager	(Bosnia and Herzegovina) Goran Skiljević
Goalkeeper coach	(Bosnia and Herzegovina) Dragan Aleksić
Doctor	(Bosnia and Herzegovina) Dr. Predrag Nikolić
Physiotherapist	(Bosnia and Herzegovina) Anđelko Cvjetinović

== Club management ==
President	(Bosnia and Herzegovina) Jelenko Vasić
Director	(Bosnia and Herzegovina) Dragan Marković
Sporting director	(Bosnia and Herzegovina) Milan Đokić
Secretary	(Bosnia and Herzegovina) Rade Vukić

== Historical list of coaches ==
- (Bosnia and Herzegovina) Darko Nestorović (2002–2003)
- (Serbia) Miroslav Milanović (2003–2004)
- (Serbia) Mladen Milinković (2004–2006)
- (Bosnia and Herzegovina) Mile Lazarević (2006–2007)
- (Serbia) Mladen Milinković (2007–2009)
- (Bosnia and Herzegovina) Milan Gutović (2009)
- (Serbia) Miodrag Radović (2010)
- (Bosnia and Herzegovina) Miroslav Milanović (Jul 2010 - Sep 2010)
- (Bosnia and Herzegovina) Darko Vojvodić (20 September 2010 – 13 March 2011)
- (Bosnia and Herzegovina) Milenko Milošević & Svetozar Vukašinović (2011)
- (Bosnia and Herzegovina) Dragan Mićić (25 March 2011 – 22 March 2015)
- (Serbia) Vladica Petrović (8 July 2015 – 2 October 2015)
- (Bosnia and Herzegovina) Cvijetin Blagojević (21 February 2016 – 17 May 2016)
- (Bosnia and Herzegovina) Mile Lazarević (1 June 2016 – 14 June 2017)
- (Bosnia and Herzegovina) Veljko Cvijetinović (Jul 2017 – Sep 2018)
- (Bosnia and Herzegovina) Milenko Bošnjaković (13 December 2018 – 17 March 2019)
- (Bosnia and Herzegovina) Aleksandar Vasić (26 March 2019 – 30 June 2019)
- (Bosnia and Herzegovina) Miroslav Milanović (Nov 2019 – Oct 2020)
- (Bosnia and Herzegovina) Bratislav Tešić (Aug 2020 – present)

== External sources ==
- Official website (in Bosnian) (archived)
- Blog about the club
