= 2008–09 First League of the Republika Srpska =

First League of the Republika Srpska
- Season: 2008–09
- Champions: Rudar (P); 1st First League title
- Promoted: Rudar (P)
- Relegated: Borac (Š); Glasinac; Jedinstvo
- Matches played: 182
- Goals scored: 592 (3.25 per match)
- Top goalscorer: Mirko Marinković (19 goals)

The 2008–09 First League of the Republika Srpska season was the fourteenth since its establishment.

== Teams ==
- Borac Šamac
- BSK Banja Luka
- Glasinac Sokolac
- Drina Zvornik
- Drina HE Višegrad
- Famos Vojkovići
- Jadinstvo Brčko
- Kozara Gradiška
- Ljubić Prnjavor
- Mladost Gacko
- Proleter Teslić
- Radnik Bijeljina
- Rudar Prijedor
- Sloboda Novi Grad
- Sloga Doboj
- Sutjeska Foča

== League standings ==
Pos	Team	Pld	W	D	L	GF	GA	GD	Pts	Promotion or relegation
1	Rudar Prijedor (C)	30	18	10	2	49	19	+30	64	Promotion to Premijer Liga BiH
2	Kozara	30	17	6	7	54	25	+29	57	
3	Radnik	30	15	7	8	50	32	+18	52	
4	Proleter Teslić	30	11	8	11	39	35	+4	41	
5	Sloga Doboj	30	11	8	11	29	33	−4	41	
6	Sutjeska Foča	30	11	7	12	34	34	0	40	
7	Ljubić	30	12	4	14	45	41	+4	40	
8	Drina Zvornik	30	11	6	13	39	36	+3	39	
9	Sloboda Novi Grad	30	11	6	13	38	37	+1	39	
10	Famos Vojkovići	30	11	6	13	40	46	−6	39	
11	Mladost Gacko	30	12	3	15	28	37	−9	39	
12	Drina Višegrad	30	11	6	13	27	44	−17	39	
13	BSK	30	11	5	14	35	43	−8	38	
14	Borac Šamac (R)	30	10	7	13	32	39	−7	37	Relegation to Second League RS
15	Glasinac (R)	30	10	4	16	31	45	−14	34	Relegation to Second League RS
16	Jedinstvo Brčko (R)	30	10	3	17	31	45	−14	33	Relegation to Second League RS

Source: BIHSoccer.com
Rules for classification: 1) points; 2) goal difference; 3) number of goals scored.
(C) Champions; (R) Relegated

== See also ==
- 2008–09 First League of the Federation of Bosnia and Herzegovina
