= FK Famos Vojkovići =

Famos
- Full name: Fudbalski klub Famos
- Nickname: Motoristi
- Founded: 1968
- Ground: Stadion u centru Vojkovića
- Chairman: Vlade Drinjak-Drica
- League: First League of RS
- 2023–24: First League of RS, 6th
Home colours	Away colours

Fudbalski klub Famos Vojkovići (Serbian Cyrillic: Фудбалски клуб Фамос Војковићи) is a football club from the Vojkovići, part of the City of Istočno Sarajevo in Republika Srpska, Bosnia and Herzegovina.

The club competes in the second tier-First League of the Republika Srpska. Their neighbors from the community of Hrasnica in Ilidža are only 3,5 kilometers away and called Famos Hrasnica.

== Club seasons ==
Season	League									Cup	Europe
Season	Division	P	W	D	L	F	A	Pts	Pos	Cup	Europe
1998–99	First League of the Republika Srpska	34	13	5	16	35	54	44	13th		
1999–00	First League of the Republika Srpska	38	11	4	23	40	76	37	18th ↓		
Current format of Premier League of Bosnia and Herzegovina
2003–04	Second League of RS – South	24	14	2	8	43	25	44	3rd		
2005–06	First League of the Republika Srpska	30	11	6	13	32	35	39	14th		
2006–07	First League of the Republika Srpska	30	13	4	13	37	36	43	9th		
2007–08	First League of the Republika Srpska	30	14	6	10	48	38	48	5th		
2008–09	First League of the Republika Srpska	30	11	6	13	40	46	39	9th		
2009–10	First League of the Republika Srpska	26	10	5	11	29	34	35	7th		
2010–11	First League of the Republika Srpska	26	8	4	14	29	42	28	13th ↓		
2014–15	Second League of RS – East	26	11	7	8	31	27	40	3rd		
2015–16	Second League of RS – East	28	16	1	11	36	22	49	3rd		
2016–17	Second League of RS – East	30	18	5	7	60	34	59	3rd		
2017–18	Second League of RS – East	30	14	6	10	57	39	48	2nd		
2018–19	Second League of RS – East	27	9	3	15	39	40	30	12th		
2019–20	Second League of RS – East	16	8	4	4	29	23	28	3rd		
2020–21	Second League of RS – East	18	9	5	4	28	9	32	2nd		
