= FK Krajina Banja Luka =

Krajina Banja Luka
- Full name: FK Krajina Banja Luka
- Founded: 1973
- Ground: Rosulje
- Capacity: 2,000
- League: Regional League RS - West
- 2020-2021: 10th
Home colours	Away colours

FK Krajina Banja Luka (Serbian Cyrillic: ФК Kpajинa Бaњa Лукa) is a football club from the city of Banja Luka, in the entity of Republika Srpska, Bosnia and Herzegovina. The club competes in the country's fourth level Regional League RS - West.

== Club seasons ==
Season	League									Cup	Europe
Season	Division	P	W	D	L	F	A	Pts	Pos	Cup	Europe
2010–11	Second League of RS – West	26	8	4	14	33	49	28	12th		
2014–15	Regional League Banja Luka	24	16	5	3	53	17	53	3rd		
2015–16	Regional League Banja Luka	24	17	2	5	57	22	53	2nd		
2016–17	Regional League Banja Luka	24	17	0	7	48	26	51	2nd		
2017–18	Regional League Banja Luka	24	21	1	2	76	11	64	1st ↑		
2018–19	Regional League RS - West	28	11	5	12	31	43	38	10th		
2019–20	Regional League RS - West	13	3	7	3	10	12	16	8th		
2020–21	Regional League RS - West	16	4	6	6	15	21	18	10th		

== External sources ==
- Club at BiHsoccer.
