= Darko Maletić =

Bosnian footballer (born 1980)

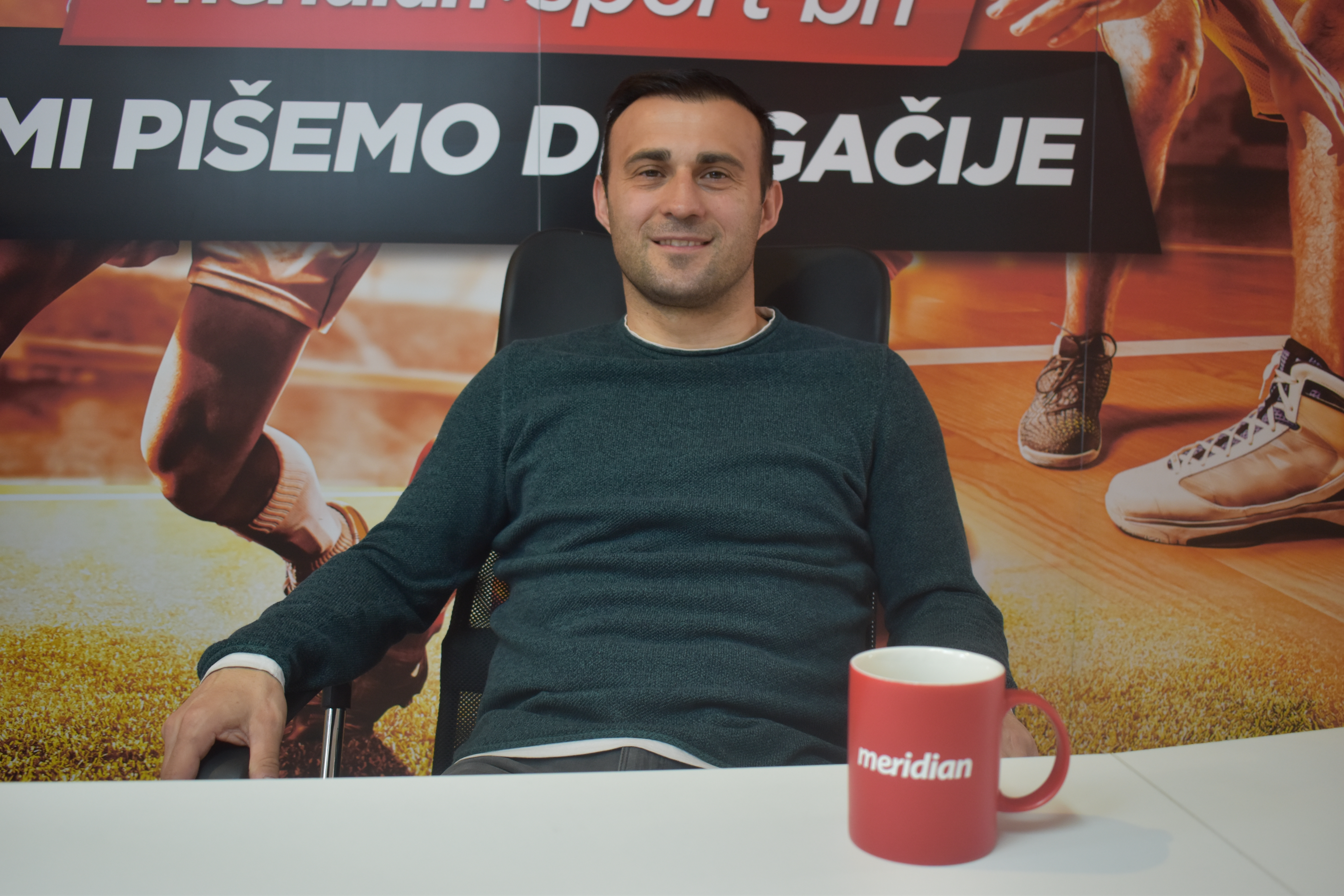
- Maletić in 2021

Personal information
- Date of birth: 20 October 1980 (age 46)
- Place of birth: Banja Luka, SFR Yugoslavia
- Height: 1.76 m (5 ft 9 in)
- Position: Midfielder

Youth career
- 1989–1997: Borac Banja Luka

Senior career*
| Years | Team | Apps | (Gls) |
| 1997–2001 | Borac Banja Luka | 57 | (6) |
| 2001–2002 | Rapid Wien | 13 | (0) |
| 2002–2004 | Publikum Celje | 39 | (2) |
| 2004 | Zenit Saint Petersburg | 2 | (0) |
| 2005 | Shinnik Yaroslavl | 8 | (0) |
| 2006 | Vaslui | 5 | (0) |
| 2006–2009 | Partizan | 44 | (2) |
| 2009–2010 | Koblenz | 10 | (1) |
| 2010–2011 | Borac Banja Luka | 21 | (6) |
| 2011–2012 | Aktobe | 21 | (2) |
| 2012 | Irtysh Pavlodar | 6 | (0) |
| 2013 | Borac Banja Luka | 13 | (2) |
| 2013–2015 | Velež Mostar | 64 | (2) |
| 2016 | Borac Banja Luka | 9 | (1) |
| Total | | 312 | (24) |

International career
| 2007–2012 | Bosnia and Herzegovina | 18 | (1) |

Managerial career
- 2017–2019: FK Karanovac (assistant)
- 2019–2020: Borac Banja Luka (assistant)
- 2020: Laktaši
- 2020–2021: Ljubić Prnjavor
- 2022–2023: Sloboda Mrkonjić Grad
- 2024: Željezničar Banja Luka
- 2025: Kozara Gradiška
- 2025–2026: Velež Mostar (assistant)
- * Club domestic league appearances and goals

Darko Maletić (Serbian Cyrillic: Дарко Малетић; born 20 October 1980) is a Bosnian professional football manager and former player.

He holds a peculiar record: he played in the UEFA Cup for five clubs from five countries (Rapid Wien, Publikum Celje, Zenit Saint Petersburg, Partizan and Aktobe).

== Club career ==
Maletić started his career with his hometown club FK Borac Banja Luka. In the summer of 2001 he moved to SK Rapid Wien. From January 2002 to the summer of 2004 he played for Publikum Celje of Slovenia. He then moved to Russia where he played for FC Zenit Saint Petersburg (2004) and FC Shinnik Yaroslavl (2005). After six months with Romanian club FC Vaslui (2006), Maletić signed for Serbian giants FK Partizan where he won double crown before he moved to TuS Koblenz in January 2009.

== International career ==
When Fuad Muzurović became the Bosnian-Herzegovinian national team's coach, the 26-year-old Maletić received his first call for a match against Norway in March 2007. He made his debut in the 82nd minute, replacing Adnan Čustović. Bosnia and Herzegovina won the match 2–1.

He played seven games in the UEFA Euro 2008 qualifying but after Miroslav Blažević became coach, he dropped from the squad. After showing good form for Borac Banja Luka in the domestic league in 2011, he was recalled by coach Safet Sušić for the match against Romania in March. He was again called up for the matches against Romania away and Albania at home in June, and responded by scoring his first goal for the national team, against Albania. Maletić earned a total of 18 caps, scoring 1 goal.

His final international was a February 2012 friendly match against Brazil.

== Career statistics ==
=== International ===
| # | Date | Venue | Opponent | Score | Result | Competition |
|---|---|---|---|---|---|---|
| 1. | 7 June 2011 | Zenica | Albania | 2–0 | Win | UEFA Euro 2012 qualifying |

=== Managerial ===
As of match played 10 April 2023

Managerial record by team and tenure
| Team | From | To | Record | | | | | | | |
| Team | From | To | G | W | D | L | GF | GA | GD | Win % |
|---|---|---|---|---|---|---|---|---|---|---|
| Laktaši | 6 August 2020 | 20 December 2020 | 12 | 4 | 1 | 7 | 20 | 24 | −4 | 33.33 |
| Ljubić Prnjavor | 26 December 2020 | 30 June 2021 | 15 | 7 | 1 | 7 | 28 | 24 | +4 | 46.67 |
| Sloboda Mrkonjić Grad | 23 January 2022 | 17 January 2023 | 32 | 14 | 5 | 13 | 51 | 47 | +4 | 43.75 |
| Total | | | 59 | 25 | 7 | 27 | 99 | 95 | +4 | 42.37 |

== Honours ==
=== Player ===
Partizan

- Serbian SuperLiga: 2007–08
- Serbian Cup: 2007–08

Borac Banja Luka

- Bosnian Premier League: 2010–11
