= FK Vučijak Majevac =

Vučijak Majevac
- Full name: FK Vučijak Majevac
- Nickname: Vukovi
- Founded: 1996.
- Ground: Stadion Majevac
- Capacity: 600
- Chairman: Zlatko Popović
- Manager: Vedran Sofić
- League: 2. liga RS
- 2012–2013: Second League of Republika Srpska
Home colours	Away colours

FK Vučijak (Serbian Cyrillic: ФК Bучиjaк Majeвaц) is a football club based in Majevac, Republika Srpska, Bosnia and Herzegovina.

== Notable coaches ==
- (Bosnia and Herzegovina) Branislav Petričević
- (Bosnia and Herzegovina) Slavko Milanović
- (Bosnia and Herzegovina) Sakib Hadžić
- (Bosnia and Herzegovina) Vedran Sofić
