= 2003–04 Premier League of Bosnia and Herzegovina =

Premijer Liga
- Season: 2003–04
- Champions: Široki Brijeg; 1st Premier League title 1st Bosnian title
- Relegated: Glasinac; Brotnjo
- Champions League: Široki Brijeg
- UEFA Cup: Željezničar; Modriča
- Intertoto Cup: Sloboda
- Matches: 240
- Goals: 657 (2.74 per match)
- Top goalscorer: Alen Škoro (20 goals)

Statistics of Premier League of Bosnia and Herzegovina in the 2003–2004 season.

== Overview ==
It was contested by 16 teams, and NK Široki Brijeg won the championship.

== Clubs and stadiums ==
Location of clubs in Premijer Liga 2003-04

| Team | Location |
|---|---|
| Borac | Banja Luka |
| Brotnjo | Čitluk |
| Čelik | Zenica |
| Glasinac | Sokolac |
| Leotar | Trebinje |
| Modriča Maxima | Modriča |
| Orašje | Orašje |
| Posušje | Posušje |
| Rudar | Ugljevik |
| Sarajevo | Sarajevo |
| Sloboda | Tuzla |
| Široki Brijeg | Široki Brijeg |
| Travnik | Travnik |
| Zrinjski | Mostar |
| Željezničar | Sarajevo |
| Žepče | Žepče |

== League standings ==
| Pos | Team | Pld | W | D | L | GF | GA | GD | Pts | Qualification or relegation |
|---|---|---|---|---|---|---|---|---|---|---|
| 1 | Široki Brijeg (C) | 30 | 19 | 4 | 7 | 58 | 32 | +26 | 61 | Qualification to Champions League first qualifying round |
| 2 | Željezničar | 30 | 18 | 5 | 7 | 67 | 35 | +32 | 59 | Qualification to UEFA Cup first qualifying round |
| 3 | Sarajevo | 30 | 17 | 5 | 8 | 58 | 25 | +33 | 56 | |
| 4 | Leotar | 30 | 17 | 5 | 8 | 46 | 23 | +23 | 56 | |
| 5 | Sloboda Tuzla | 30 | 11 | 9 | 10 | 38 | 36 | +2 | 42 | Qualification to Intertoto Cup first round |
| 6 | Modriča | 30 | 11 | 7 | 12 | 43 | 43 | 0 | 40 | Qualification to UEFA Cup first qualifying round (Note: Modriča won 2003–04 Bosnian Cup and qualified for the first qualifying round of the UEFA Cup.) |
| 7 | Borac Banja Luka | 30 | 11 | 6 | 13 | 40 | 42 | −2 | 39 | |
| 8 | Orašje | 30 | 12 | 3 | 15 | 40 | 51 | −11 | 39 | |
| 9 | Rudar Ugljevik | 30 | 11 | 6 | 13 | 31 | 43 | −12 | 39 | |
| 10 | Posušje | 30 | 11 | 6 | 13 | 35 | 48 | −13 | 39 | |
| 11 | Zrinjski | 30 | 11 | 5 | 14 | 40 | 47 | −7 | 38 | |
| 12 | Čelik | 30 | 9 | 10 | 11 | 42 | 43 | −1 | 37 | |
| 13 | Žepče | 30 | 10 | 7 | 13 | 26 | 38 | −12 | 37 | |
| 14 | Travnik | 30 | 10 | 7 | 13 | 30 | 43 | −13 | 37 | |
| 15 | Glasinac (R) | 30 | 9 | 6 | 15 | 34 | 49 | −15 | 33 | Relegation to Prva Liga RS |
| 16 | Brotnjo (R) | 30 | 4 | 7 | 19 | 29 | 59 | −30 | 19 | Relegation to Prva Liga FBiH |

Source: RSSSF.org
Rules for classification: 1) points; 2) goal difference; 3) number of goals scored.
(C) Champions; (R) Relegated

== Results ==
| Home \ Away | BOR | BRO | ČEL | GLA | LEO | MOD | ORA | POS | RUG | SAR | SLO | ŠB | TRA | ZRI | ŽEL | ŽEP |
|---|---|---|---|---|---|---|---|---|---|---|---|---|---|---|---|---|
| Borac Banja Luka | | 3–0 | 1–1 | 2–1 | 2–0 | 0–0 | 2–1 | 3–1 | 6–0 | 3–2 | 2–1 | 1–3 | 2–0 | 2–0 | 1–2 | 2–0 |
| Brotnjo | 3–0 | | 2–0 | 3–1 | 2–3 | 0–0 | 2–3 | 0–3 | 1–2 | 0–2 | 0–2 | 2–3 | 0–0 | 2–3 | 2–2 | 3–4 |
| Čelik | 2–2 | 0–0 | | 5–0 | 1–0 | 0–0 | 2–0 | 3–1 | 1–0 | 1–1 | 2–2 | 4–2 | 3–1 | 1–1 | 3–1 | 1–2 |
| Glasinac | 3–0 | 1–1 | 1–1 | | 0–3 | 2–1 | 3–0 | 6–1 | 0–0 | 0–3 | 1–0 | 0–1 | 1–0 | 2–0 | 2–1 | 3–0 |
| Leotar | 2–1 | 5–0 | 2–0 | 2–0 | | 3–0 | 3–0 | 3–0 | 2–0 | 4–1 (Note: The round 16 match between Leotar and Sarajevo was interrupted in the 37th minute with a 1–0 lead for Sarajevo due to poor playing conditions. In the repeated match, Leotar was won 4–1.) | 2–1 | 2–0 | 2–0 | 2–0 | 0–0 | 1–0 |
| Modriča | 3–3 | 1–2 | 4–1 | 1–0 | 3–0 | | 4–0 | 2–0 | 1–0 | 3–1 | 5–3 | 2–3 | 4–1 | 2–1 | 1–1 | 2–0 |
| Orašje | 1–0 | 1–0 | 2–0 | 3–0 | 1–1 | 2–2 | | 3–1 | 2–2 | 0–1 | 2–1 | 3–1 | 1–0 | 3–2 | 2–3 | 2–0 |
| Posušje | 2–0 | 0–0 | 3–2 | 2–1 | 0–0 | 2–0 | 2–1 | | 0–0 | 1–0 | 0–0 | 0–0 | 2–2 | 2–0 | 2–3 | 3–1 |
| Rudar Ugljevik | 3–1 | 2–2 | 1–0 | 2–0 | 0–3 | 2–1 | 2–0 | 1–0 | | 0–0 | 4–2 | 1–1 | 3–0 | 1–2 | 1–0 | 3–0 |
| Sarajevo | 3–1 | 2–0 | 3–2 | 3–0 | 3–0 | 5–0 | 0–1 | 4–0 | 1–0 | | 3–0 | 4–1 | 5–0 | 1–0 | 1–1 | 3–0 |
| Sloboda Tuzla | 0–0 | 2–1 | 2–1 | 3–0 | 1–0 | 1–0 | 1–0 | 3–1 | 3–0 | 2–2 | | 1–1 | 0–0 | 2–3 | 1–1 | 1–1 |
| Široki Brijeg | 1–0 | 3–0 (Note: The round 11 match between Široki Brijeg and Brotnjo was interrupted in 45th minute with the result 3–2, and was registered 3–0 for Široki Brijeg.) | 3–0 | 3–3 | 2–0 | 3–0 | 2–0 | 4–2 | 4–0 | 1–0 | 1–0 | | 4–0 | 3–0 | 2–0 | 2–0 |
| Travnik | 3–0 (Note: The round 12 match between Travnik and Borac Banja Luka (2–0) was repeated because the Travnik's player Midhat Sarajlić, has not eligible to play. In the repeated match, Travnik was won 3–0.) | 1–0 | 1–1 | 3–2 | 0–0 | 2–0 | 3–1 | 3–0 | 3–0 | 0–2 | 0–2 | 2–1 | | 2–1 | 2–1 | 0–0 |
| Zrinjski | 1–0 | 5–0 | 1–1 | 0–0 | 1–1 | 0–0 | 5–3 | 0–2 | 2–0 | 2–1 | 0–1 | 1–2 | 2–0 | | 1–5 | 2–1 |
| Željezničar | 3–0 | 3–1 | 2–3 | 4–0 | 3–0 | 4–1 | 4–1 | 2–0 | 4–1 | 2–1 | 3–0 | 2–0 | 3–1 | 4–2 | | 2–1 |
| Žepče | 0–0 | 2–0 | 2–0 | 1–1 | 1–0 | 1–0 | 2–1 | 1–2 | 1–0 | 0–0 | 0–0 | 2–1 | 0–0 | 1–2 | 2–1 | |

Source: RSSSF.org
Legend: Blue = home team win; Yellow = draw; Red = away team win.

== Top goalscorers ==
| Rank | Player | Club | Goals |
|---|---|---|---|
| 1 | (Bosnia and Herzegovina) Alen Škoro | Sarajevo | 20 |
| 2 | (Croatia) Domagoj Abramović | Široki Brijeg | 16 |
| 3 | (Serbia and Montenegro) Zoran Rajović | Glasinac | 13 |
| 3 | (Bosnia and Herzegovina) Admir Hasančić | Čelik | 13 |
| 5 | (Bosnia and Herzegovina) Dželaludin Muharemović | Željezničar | 12 |
| 5 | (Croatia) Goran Jagić | Posušje | 12 |
| 5 | (Bosnia and Herzegovina) Alen Mešanović | Sloboda | 12 |
| 5 | (Bosnia and Herzegovina) Admir Raščić | Željezničar | 12 |
| 9 | (Bosnia and Herzegovina) Đorđe Savić | Modriča | 11 |
| 10 | (Bosnia and Herzegovina) Miljan Pecelj | Brotnjo / Zrinjski | 10 |
| 10 | (Bosnia and Herzegovina) (Croatia) Ivo Pejić | Orašje | 10 |
| 10 | (Serbia and Montenegro) Nenad Stojaković | Rudar Ugljevik | 10 |

== Attendances ==
| # | Club | Average |
|---|---|---|
| 1 | Sarajevo | 6,875 |
| 2 | Čelik | 4,643 |
| 3 | Sloboda | 3,543 |
| 4 | Željezničar | 3,500 |
| 5 | Zrinjski | 3,375 |
| 6 | Široki | 2,714 |
| 7 | Borac | 2,671 |
| 8 | Zepče | 1,925 |
| 9 | Leotar | 1,857 |
| 10 | Travnik | 1,850 |
| 11 | Orašje | 1,781 |
| 12 | Posušje | 1,600 |
| 13 | Rudar | 1,119 |
| 14 | Modriča | 1,114 |
| 15 | Glasinac | 813 |
| 16 | Brotnjo | 750 |
