= Milenko Milošević =

Bosnian footballer and manager

Personal information
- Full name: Milenko Milošević
- Date of birth: 13 November 1976 (age 49)
- Place of birth: Zvornik, SFR Yugoslavia
- Height: 1.88 m (6 ft 2 in)
- Position: Defensive midfielder

Youth career
- Zvornik Trnovica

Senior career*
Years	Team	Apps	(Gls)
1996–1997	Red Star Belgrade	0	(0)
1997–1998	Loznica	22	(0)
1998–1999	Mogren	0	(0)
1999–2000	Loznica	17	(0)
2000–2003	Sutjeska Nikšić	57	(3)
2003–2008	Cercle Brugge	78	(2)
2007–2008	→ KV Oostende	15	(0)
2008–2009	BS Poperinge		
2009	Drina Zvornik		

International career
2004	Bosnia and Herzegovina	1	(0)

Managerial career
- 2011: Drina Zvornik
- * Club domestic league appearances and goals

Milenko Milošević (born 13 November 1976) is a retired Bosnian footballer and football manager. He usually fielded as a defensive midfielder, although Milo was also able to play as central defender.

== Club career ==
=== FR Yugoslav First League ===
Born in Zvornik, SR Bosnia and Herzegovina, Milenko Milošević played his early career in Serbia with FK Loznica from where he moved to Red Star Belgrade. After playing in Belgrade two seasons, he moved to another First League of FR Yugoslavia side, FK Sutjeska Nikšić.

=== Career in Belgium ===
Searching for a defensive midfielder, Belgian First division side Excelsior Mouscron offered Milošević a trial in 2003. During this trial however, Mouscron signed Algerian international Samir Beloufa for the position of defensive midfielder, making it no longer useful for Mouscron to sign Milosevic. Georges Leekens, the Mouscron coach at that time, recommended Milošević to his former team Cercle Brugge, who had just promoted and were interested in any improvement for the squad. Milošević signed a contract a little later.

His contract with Cercle ended in 2008 and was not renewed. He signed for West Flanders Division One side Blue Star Poperinge, where he met his former Cercle manager Jerko Tipurić. Poperinge became champions and will play in the lowest nationwide league next season.

== International career ==
Milošević has also played once for the senior national team of Bosnia and Herzegovina, winning 1–2 in a match against Luxembourg in 2004. He came on as a second-half substitute for Muhamed Konjić.

== Managerial career ==
By early 2011, after Drina Zvornik manager Darko Vojvodić resigned, Milošević along with Svetozar Vukašinović took charge of the team in their Bosnian Premier League match against Olimpik and stayed as the club's dual managers until Dragan Mićić got appointed on 25 March 2011.

=== Managerial statistics ===
As of match played 1 March 2021

Team	Nat	From	To	Record				
Team	Nat	From	To	G	W	D	L	Win %
Drina Zvornik	(Bosnia and Herzegovina)	13 September 2011	19 September 2011	1	0	0	1	0.00
Total				1	0	0	1	0.0
