= FK Kozara Gradiška =

Kozara Gradiška
- Full name: Fudbalski klub Kozara Gradiška
- Nickname: Crveno-bijeli (The Red-Whites)
- Founded: 1 June 1945; 81 years ago
- Ground: Gradski stadion Velimir Sombolac
- Capacity: 5,000
- Chairman: Zoran Adžić
- Manager: Igor Janković
- League: First League of RS
- 2025–26: First League of RS, 5th
- Website: fk-kozara.com

Fudbalski klub Kozara Gradiška (Serbian Cyrillic: Фудбалски клуб Koзapa Градишка) is a professional football club from the town of Gradiška, in northern Bosnia and Herzegovina. The club played in the Premier League of Bosnia and Herzegovina in the 2002–03 season. However, they ended up being relegated to the First League of the Republika Srpska after their first season in the country's top league. The club played from 2003 to 2011 in the second level of Bosnia and Herzegovina. After the season 2010–11, the team's promoted again to the Premier League. At the end of the 2011–12 season, they finished on 16th position and were relegated again to the lower tier.

== Honours ==
=== Domestic ===
==== League ====
- First League of the Republika Srpska:
  - Winners (1): 2010–11
- Yugoslav Second League:
  - Third place (1): 1973–74
- Bosnia and Herzegovina Republic League:
  - Winners (1): 1980–81

==== Cups ====
- Republika Srpska Cup:
  - Winners (3): 1993–94, 1999–00, 2000–01

== Club seasons ==
Season	League									Cup	Europe
Season	Division	P	W	D	L	F	A	Pts	Pos	Cup	Europe
1995–96	First League of the Republika Srpska	20	8	6	6	37	20	30	3rd		
1996–97	First League of the Republika Srpska	22	10	3	9	26	26	33	7th		
1997–98	First League of the Republika Srpska	34	15	3	16	47	41	48	10th		
1998–99	First League of the Republika Srpska	34	17	8	9	58	36	59	4th		
1999–00	First League of the Republika Srpska	38	17	6	15	51	40	57	9th		
Current format of Premier League of Bosnia and Herzegovina
2000–01	First League of the Republika Srpska	30	14	1	15	48	46	43	9th		
2001–02	First League of the Republika Srpska	30	17	5	8	58	35	56	2nd ↑		
2002–03	Premier League of Bosnia and Herzegovina	38	15	6	17	55	62	51	15th ↓		
2003–04	First League of the Republika Srpska	30	12	5	13	26	31	41	10th		
2004–05	First League of the Republika Srpska	30	16	3	11	40	28	51	3rd		
2005–06	First League of the Republika Srpska	30	14	5	11	37	33	47	4th		
2006–07	First League of the Republika Srpska	30	13	4	13	41	38	43	7th		
2007–08	First League of the Republika Srpska	30	14	10	6	44	25	52	3rd		
2008–09	First League of the Republika Srpska	30	17	6	7	54	25	57	2nd		
2009–10	First League of the Republika Srpska	26	9	9	8	36	23	36	5th		
2010–11	First League of the Republika Srpska	26	18	4	4	46	12	58	1st ↑		
2011–12	Premier League of Bosnia and Herzegovina	30	4	7	19	19	45	19	16th ↓		
2012–13	First League of the Republika Srpska	26	13	4	9	42	39	43	3rd		
2013–14	First League of the Republika Srpska	26	11	9	6	32	26	42	4th		
2014–15	First League of the Republika Srpska	26	12	5	9	44	31	41	3rd		
2015–16	First League of the Republika Srpska	22	9	6	7	29	17	33	5th		
2016–17	First League of the Republika Srpska	22	8	8	8	30	27	30	6th		
2017–18	First League of the Republika Srpska	22	3	9	10	16	36	18	10th		
2018–19	First League of the Republika Srpska	22	8	5	9	23	25	29	5th		
2019–20	First League of the Republika Srpska	14	6	4	4	15	16	22	3rd		
2020–21	First League of the Republika Srpska	30	11	9	10	34	28	42	8th		
2021–22	First League of the Republika Srpska	30	8	5	17	36	47	29	13th		
2022–23	First League of the Republika Srpska	34	12	7	15	48	56	43	9th		
2023–24	First League of the Republika Srpska	34	13	8	13	52	52	47	7th		
2024–25	First League of the Republika Srpska	34	11	9	14	38	47	42	12th		
2025–26	First League of the Republika Srpska	29	11	7	11	28	34	40	5th		

== Players ==
=== Current squad ===
As of 22 August 2026

Note: Flags indicate national team as defined under FIFA eligibility rules; some limited exceptions apply. Players may hold more than one non-FIFA nationality.

No.	Pos.	Nation	Player
1	GK	BIH	Pavle Glišić
3	DF	BIH	Savo Veljkić
4	DF	BIH	Marko Dakić
5	DF	CRO	Noa Karaselimović
6	DF	BIH	Srđan Mišić
7	MF	BIH	Sergej Govedarica
8	FW	BIH	Marko Babić
9	FW	BIH	Bojan Marković
10	MF	BIH	Ognjen Škorić
11	MF	BIH	Srboljub Jandrić (captain)
14	MF	BIH	Lazar Aleksić
15	FW	BIH	Filip Predojević
17	MF	BIH	Obren Cvijanović
18	DF	BIH	Đorđe Veljkić (vice-captain)
19	MF	BIH	Stefan Bogosavljević

No.	Pos.	Nation	Player
20	MF	BIH	Jovan Dragojević
21	MF	BIH	Danilo Vujičić
22	DF	BIH	Nebojša Babić
23	DF	BIH	Ognjen Pljevaljčić
24	DF	BIH	Duško Pepić
29	MF	BIH	Veljko Pavlović
33	DF	BIH	Aleksandar Divić
38	GK	BIH	Miloš Vujević
77	FW	AUT	Dragan Klincov
79	GK	BIH	Dražen Iliktarević
88	MF	BIH	Danilo Ilić
95	MF	BIH	Dejan Maksimović
97	MF	BIH	Dragan Pejić
—	MF	BIH	Marko Đurić
—	MF	BIH	Dušan Petrović

==== Players with multiple nationalities ====
- (Bosnia and Herzegovina) (Serbia) Danilo Vujičić
- (Bosnia and Herzegovina) (Croatia) Marko Babić
- (Bosnia and Herzegovina) (Croatia) Dejan Maksimović

=== Former players ===
For a list of players with Wikipedia article, please see Category:FK Kozara Gradiška players.

== Kozara technical staff ==
Current staff
- Head coach: (Bosnia and Herzegovina) Igor Janković
- Assistant coach: (Bosnia and Herzegovina) Milan Ozren
- Assistant coach: (Bosnia and Herzegovina) Dalibor Kozić
- Goalkeeping coach: (Bosnia and Herzegovina) Marko Reljić
- Fitness coach: (Bosnia and Herzegovina) Sveto Erceg
- Doctor: (Bosnia and Herzegovina) Sanja Kežić
- Doctor: (Bosnia and Herzegovina) Ognjen Desančić
- Physiotherapist: (Bosnia and Herzegovina) Nazima Ališić
- Physiotherapist: (Bosnia and Herzegovina) Vedran Savić
- Secretary of the coaching staff: (Bosnia and Herzegovina) Srećko Gajić

=== Historical list of managers ===
- (Bosnia and Herzegovina) Velimir Sombolac
- (Socialist Federal Republic of Yugoslavia) Ilija Miljuš
- (Bosnia and Herzegovina) Dragan Vukša
- (Bosnia and Herzegovina) Cvijetin Blagojević
- (Bosnia and Herzegovina) Borče Sredojević (2003–04)
- (Bosnia and Herzegovina) Miloš Pojić (2004 – June 2009)
- (Bosnia and Herzegovina) Ile Perišić (July 2009 – June 2010)
- (Bosnia and Herzegovina) Vinko Marinović (July 2010 – Sept 2011)
- (Bosnia and Herzegovina) Vlado Jagodić (Sept 2011 – April 2012)
- (Bosnia and Herzegovina) Siniša Đurić (caretaker) (May 2012)
- (Bosnia and Herzegovina) Miloš Pojić (May 2012 – April 2013)
- (Bosnia and Herzegovina) Igor Janković (April 2013 – March 2015)
- (Bosnia and Herzegovina) Saša Krupljanin (March 2015 – Oct 2015)
- (Bosnia and Herzegovina) Stojan Timarac (caretaker) (Oct 2015)
- (Bosnia and Herzegovina) Velimir Stojnić (Oct 2015 – June 2017)
- (Bosnia and Herzegovina) Borče Sredojević (June 2017 – Sept 2017)
- (Bosnia and Herzegovina) Predrag Tomaš (caretaker) (Sept 2017)
- (Bosnia and Herzegovina) Siniša Đurić (Oct 2017 – Dec 2017)
- (Bosnia and Herzegovina) Vule Trivunović (Dec 2017 – Dec 2018)
- (Bosnia and Herzegovina) Igor Janković (Dec 2018 – June 2019)
- (Bosnia and Herzegovina) Nedžad Žerić (July 2019 – June 2022)
- (Bosnia and Herzegovina) Saša Krupljanin (June 2022 – Jan 2023)
- (Slovenia) Alen Medović (Jan 2023 – May 2025)
- (Bosnia and Herzegovina) Srboljub Jandrić (player-caretaker) (May 2025)
- (Bosnia and Herzegovina) Darko Maletić (July 2025 – Sept 2025)
- (Bosnia and Herzegovina) Vlado Jagodić (Sept 2025 – May 2026)
- (Bosnia and Herzegovina) Igor Janković (June 2026 – present)

== Club management ==
Current board
- President: (Bosnia and Herzegovina) Zoran Adžić
- Director: (Bosnia and Herzegovina) Sandro Zeničanin
- Technical director: (Bosnia and Herzegovina) Radislav Kačavenda
- Head of Youth Development: (Bosnia and Herzegovina) Igor Janković
- General secretary: (Bosnia and Herzegovina) Ružica Bakal
- Board members:
- (Bosnia and Herzegovina) Zoran Adžić
- (Bosnia and Herzegovina) Radislav Kačavenda
- (Bosnia and Herzegovina) Miloš Vujinić
- (Bosnia and Herzegovina) Sandro Zeničanin
- (Bosnia and Herzegovina) Mihajlo Kosović
- (Bosnia and Herzegovina) Rajko Romić
- (Bosnia and Herzegovina) Milan Vujić
- (Bosnia and Herzegovina) Denis Šmitran
- (Bosnia and Herzegovina) Branislav Banjac
- (Italy) Alessandro Pozzo
