= FK Željezničar Doboj =

Football club

Željezničar Doboj
- Full name: Fudbalski klub Željezničar Doboj
- Nickname: Željo
- Founded: 1933
- Ground: 15 April
- Capacity: 2000
- Chairman: Mihajlo Marković
- Manager: Ratko Nikolić
- League: Second League RS – West
- 2015–16: Second League RS – West, 13th
Home colours	Away colours

Fudbalski klub Željezničar Doboj (Serbian Cyrillic: Фудбалски клуб Жeљeзничap Дoбoj) is a football club based in Doboj, Republika Srpska, Bosnia and Herzegovina. Željezničar meaning "railwayman" is a common name for sports clubs associated with railway workers.

== Coaching history ==
- (Bosnia and Herzegovina) Ferko Salihović
- (Bosnia and Herzegovina) Esad Mlivić
- (Bosnia and Herzegovina) Branko Poljašević
- (Bosnia and Herzegovina) Zlatko Spasojević
- (Bosnia and Herzegovina) Vladimir Šuvak
- (Bosnia and Herzegovina) Danko Mišić
- (Bosnia and Herzegovina) Dragan Đurđević
- (Bosnia and Herzegovina) Slavko Petrović
- (Bosnia and Herzegovina) Arnes Handžić
- (Bosnia and Herzegovina) Milan Draganović
- (Bosnia and Herzegovina) Slobodan Ostojić
- (Bosnia and Herzegovina) Dragan Đurđević

== Presidential history ==
- (Bosnia and Herzegovina) Novo Panić
- (Bosnia and Herzegovina) Dragoljub Nakić
- (Bosnia and Herzegovina) Murvet Bajraktarević
- (Bosnia and Herzegovina) Predrag Jevtić
- (Bosnia and Herzegovina) Savo Mihajlović
