= FK Hercegovac Bileća =

Hercegovac Bileća
- Full name: Fudbalski klub Hercegovac Bileća
- Nickname(s): Džukele; HEO
- Founded: 6 March 1935; 90 years ago
- Ground: Gradski stadion, Bileća
- Chairman: (Serbia) Vladimir Kašiković

Fudbalski klub Hercegovac Bileća is a football club from the town of Bileća, in the south of Republika Srpska of Bosnia and Herzegovina.

== History ==
It was established in 1935. They played in the 2004–05 First League of the Republika Srpska season, which was on the highest level they have ever played.

== Club seasons ==
Season	League									Cup	Europe
Season	Division	P	W	D	L	F	A	Pts	Pos	Cup	Europe
1997–98	Second League of RS – Group Srpsko Sarajevo	28	10	6	12	46	44	36	8th		
1998–99	Second League of RS – South	26	8	9	9	53	45	33	8th		
1999–00	Second League of RS – South	20	12	6	2	42	17	42	3rd		
Current format of Premier League of Bosnia and Herzegovina
2003–04	Second League of RS – South	24	17	2	5	60	16	53	1st ↑		
2004–05	First League of the Republika Srpska	30	3	4	23	21	87	13	16th ↓		
2005–06	Second League of RS – South										
2014–15	Regional League of RS – South	10	3	3	4	20	22	12	4th		
