= Siniša Đurić =

Bosnia and Herzegovinian footballer (born 1976)

Personal information
- Date of birth: 20 February 1976 (age 50)
- Place of birth: Banja Luka, SFR Yugoslavia
- Position: Forward

Youth career
- Kozara Gradiška
- Borac Banja Luka

Senior career*
Years	Team	Apps	(Gls)
1994–1996	Borac Banja Luka		
1996–2001	Zemun		
2001–2002	Kozara Gradiška		
2002–2004	Borac Banja Luka		
2004–2005	Kickers Offenbach		
2006–2008	Laktaši		
2008–2009	Sloga Trn		
2009–2010	Kozara Gradiška		

International career
1992	Yugoslavia U16		

Managerial career
- 2010–2012: Kozara Gradiška (assistant)
- 2012: Kozara Gradiška (caretaker)
- 2013–2015: Kozara Gradiška (youth)
- 2015–2016: Sloga DIPO Gornji Podgradci
- 2016–2017: Dubrave
- 2017: Kozara Gradiška (sports director)
- 2017: Kozara Gradiška
- 2017–2020: Kozara Gradiška (sports director)
- * Club domestic league appearances and goals

Siniša Đurić (Serbian Cyrillic: Синиша Ђурић; born 20 February 1976) is a Bosnian football manager and former player.

== International career ==
Đurić played for the Yugoslavia national under-16 football team.
