= OFK Glasinac 2011 =

FK Glasinac 2011
- Full name: OFK Glasinac 2011
- Founded: 1936 and again in 2011
- Dissolved: 2011
- Ground: Stadion Bara, Sokolac
- Capacity: 2,000
- League: Second League of Republika Srpska East
Home colours	Away colours

OFK Glasinac 2011 (Serbian Cyrillic: OФК Гласинац 2011) is a football club from the town of Sokolac, in Republika Srpska, Bosnia and Herzegovina. It is part of a wider sports society named SD Sokolac. The club competes in the Second League of the Republika Srpska, a third-tier competition in Bosnia and Herzegovina. The club colours are red and blue.

The club has, besides the senior football section, also 4 different youth levels that have traditionally been the first teams of many footballers that later continued their careers in other stronger leagues.

== History ==
=== FK Glasinac ===
FK Glasinac Sokolac was formed in 1936. Until 1941 it worked exclusively with youth and contributed to the development of sports in the Romanija region.

After the end of the World War II, its activities were restored in 1949 and it began competing in the regional Bosnian leagues, where it stayed until the break-up of SFR Yugoslavia and the beginning of the Bosnian War in 1992.

In April 1993 the club joined the Football Association of Republika Srpska and started competing in the First league of Republika Srpska. In the seasons 1993–94 and 1994–95 it played in the First League of RS group East, and after the formation of the unified First League of RS it has been a constant member. It played in the 2002–03 and 2003–04 editions of the Premier League of Bosnia and Herzegovina. Since then, it has returned to the First League of RS, now a second national tier.

=== OFK Glasinac 2011 ===
After FK Glasinac was declared bankrupt in spring 2011, all parties agreed a new club would be established under a different name. Successor OFK Glasinac 2011 then started in the lower leagues, but soon reached Bosnia and Herzegovina's third tier-Second League of RS – East.

== Fans ==
The club fans are named Vandali, in English, Vandals.

== Club seasons ==
Season	League									Cup	Europe
Season	Division	P	W	D	L	F	A	Pts	Pos	Cup	Europe
As FK Glasinac
1995–96	First League of the Republika Srpska	20	11	2	7	40	27	25	2nd		
1996–97	First League of the Republika Srpska	22	12	3	7	61	37	39	3rd		
1997–98	First League of the Republika Srpska	34	15	12	7	56	41	57	3rd		
1998–99	First League of the Republika Srpska	34	15	3	16	57	56	48	9th		
1999–00	First League of the Republika Srpska	38	17	5	16	58	44	56	10th		
Current format of Premier League of Bosnia and Herzegovina
2000–01	First League of the Republika Srpska	30	10	7	13	26	41	37	13th		
2001–02	First League of the Republika Srpska	30	17	3	10	49	39	54	4th ↑		
2002–03	Premier League of Bosnia and Herzegovina	38	16	4	18	37	54	52	14th		
2003–04	Premier League of Bosnia and Herzegovina	30	9	6	15	34	39	33	15th ↓		
2004–05	First League of the Republika Srpska	30	13	3	14	38	36	42	11th		
2005–06	First League of the Republika Srpska	30	12	7	11	32	28	43	7th		
2006–07	First League of the Republika Srpska	30	14	2	14	34	35	38	15th ↓		
2007–08	Second League of RS – East								↑		
2008–09	First League of the Republika Srpska	30	10	4	16	31	45	34	15th ↓		
2009–10	Second League of RS – East										
2010–11	Second League of RS – East	26	11	5	10	38	28	38	7th		
As OFK Glasinac 2011
2014–15	Second League of RS – East	26	10	3	13	28	39	33	12th		
2015–16	Second League of RS – East	28	11	5	12	35	29	38	6th		
2016–17	Second League of RS – East	30	13	6	11	48	49	45	6th		
2017–18	Second League of RS – East	30	13	8	9	49	38	47	4th		
2018–19	Second League of RS – East	28	15	2	11	48	33	47	3rd		
2019–20	Second League of RS – East	16	7	1	8	25	31	22	9th		
2020–21	Second League of RS – East	18	9	3	6	30	26	30	4th		

== Notable former players ==
For all current and former players with Wikipedia articles, see Category:OFK Glasinac 2011 players.

== Historical list of coaches ==
- (Serbia) Mihajlo Bošnjak
- (Bosnia and Herzegovina) Milan Makić
- (Bosnia and Herzegovina) Milan Renovica
