= FK Jedinstvo Brčko =

Jedinstvo 1919
- Full name: Fudbalski klub Jedinstvo Brčko
- Founded: 1919; 107 years ago
- Ground: Gradski stadion, Brčko
- Capacity: 16,000
- Chairman: Radojica Božić
- Manager: Zoran Brković
- League: Second League of RS – East
- 2020–21: First League of RS, 16th (relegated)
Home colours	Away colours

Fudbalski klub Jedinstvo Brčko (Serbian Cyrillic: Фудбалски клуб Јединство Бpчкo) is a professional association football club, founded in 1919 in the city of Brčko that is situated in the Brčko District, Bosnia and Herzegovina. The club competed in the First League of the Republika Srpska, a second-tier competition in Bosnia and Herzegovina. The club played its home matches on the Gradski stadion (City Stadium) in Brčko, which has a capacity of 16,000 seats.

Jedinstvo used to compete in the Yugoslav Second League before the break-up of SFR Yugoslavia. They were promoted to the second league as champions of the third league in 2015.

As of 13 April 2022, Jedinstvo has been disbanded and is no longer competing in any football tournament, seemingly caused by a lack of funds and enthusiasm for the club.

But in 2025 the club came back. With the municipality renovateing the stadium and the club getting ready for the ongoing seasons. They changed the name from " FK Jedinstvo Brčko" to "Jedinstvo 1919".³

== Honours ==
=== Domestic ===
==== League ====
- Second League of the Republika Srpska:
  - Winners (2): 2016–17 (east), 2018–19 (east)

==== Cups ====
- Republika Srpska Cup:
  - Winners (2): 2002–03, 2004–05

== Club seasons ==
Season	League									Cup	Europe
Season	Division	P	W	D	L	F	A	Pts	Pos	Cup	Europe
1996–97	First League of the RS – East	22	6	2	14	18	44	20	12th ↓		
1997–98	Second League of RS – Group "Bijeljina"	25	14	5	6	60	31	47	1st ↑		
1998–99	First League of the BiH	34	11	5	18	43	70	38	16th		
1999–00	First League of the RS	38	14	3	21	49	79	45	17th ↓		
Current format of Premier League of Bosnia and Herzegovina
2001–02	First League of the Republika Srpska	30	6	4	20	25	59	22	16th		
2002–03	First League of the Republika Srpska	28	12	5	11	35	25	41	5th		
2003–04	First League of the Republika Srpska	30	13	2	15	29	37	41	7th		
2004–05	First League of the Republika Srpska	30	14	3	13	32	36	45	8th		
2005–06	First League of the Republika Srpska	30	11	7	12	38	38	40	11th		
2006–07	First League of the Republika Srpska	30	11	7	12	27	35	40	14th ↓		
2007–08	Second League of RS – East								1st ↑		
2008–09	First League of the Republika Srpska	30	10	3	17	31	45	33	16th ↓		
2009–10	Second League of RS – East										
2010–11	Second League of RS – East	26	16	4	6	47	26	52	2nd		
2014–15	Regional League RS - East	26	21	5	0	83	19	68	1st ↑		
2015–16	Second League of RS – East	28	11	4	13	45	48	37	9th		
2016–17	Second League of RS – East	30	19	6	5	56	28	63	2nd		
2017–18	Second League of RS – East	30	10	8	12	42	44	38	11th		
2018–19	Second League of RS – East	27	24	2	1	64	9	74	1st ↑		
2019–20	First League of the Republika Srpska	13	2	2	9	12	28	8	9th		
2020–21	First League of the Republika Srpska	30	4	6	20	29	72	18	16th ↓		

== Players ==
=== Current squad ===
As of 17 April 2021

Note: Flags indicate national team as defined under FIFA eligibility rules; some limited exceptions apply. Players may hold more than one non-FIFA nationality.

No.	Pos.	Nation	Player
1	GK	BIH	Ibrahim Dagoja
2	DF	BIH	Slavko Aleksić
3	DF	BIH	Lazar Krošnjar
4	DF	BIH	Berlin Torlaković
5	DF	BIH	Strahinja Đurđić
6	MF	BIH	Davor Arnautović
7	FW	BIH	Mirzet Buljubašić
8	MF	BIH	Savo Đokić
9	FW	BIH	Željko Mitrović
10	MF	SRB	Strahinja Macanović
11	FW	BIH	Stefan Božić
12	GK	BIH	Igor Vukadinović

No.	Pos.	Nation	Player
13	MF	BIH	Stefan Pajić
14	MF	BIH	Sanjin Subotić
15	FW	BIH	Viktor Draganić
16	DF	BIH	Danijel Ilić
17	DF	BIH	Branislav Šer
18	MF	BIH	Semin Šabanović
19	FW	BIH	Nikola Ivić
—	DF	BIH	Dragan Živanović
—		BIH	Edin Kesić
—		BIH	Vanja Zekić
—		BIH	Amar H. Jusufović

=== Former players ===
For the list of former players with Wikipedia article, please see Category:FK Jedinstvo Brčko players.

== Historical list of managers ==
- (Bosnia and Herzegovina) Ibrahim Biogradlić
- (Bosnia and Herzegovina) Dobrivoje Živkov
- (Bosnia and Herzegovina) Vlatko Konjevod
- (Bosnia and Herzegovina) Miralem Ibrahimović
- (Bosnia and Herzegovina) Vlado Zelenika
- (Serbia) Tomislav Manojlović
- (Bosnia and Herzegovina) Radomir Jovičić
- (Serbia) Nebojša Vučićević (2002)
- (Bosnia and Herzegovina) Milenko Radić
- (Bosnia and Herzegovina) Dževad Bekić
- (North Macedonia) Milko Djurovski (2010–2011)
- (Bosnia and Herzegovina) Drago Vujatović
- (Bosnia and Herzegovina) Savo Obradović
- (Bosnia and Herzegovina) Nikola Nikić
- (Bosnia and Herzegovina) Dragiša Krajšumović
- (Serbia) Miroslav Milanović
- (Bosnia and Herzegovina) Bambi Gusterovic
- (Bosnia and Herzegovina) Ratko Nikolić
- (Bosnia and Herzegovina) Vidoje Zarić (2017)
- (Bosnia and Herzegovina) Nusret Muslimović (2020)
- (Bosnia and Herzegovina) Zoran Brković (2020–2021)
