= FK Polet 1926 =

OFK Polet B. Brod
- Full name: Fudbalski klub Polet 1926 Brod
- Founded: 2012
- Ground: Gradski stadion, Brod
- 2019–20: Second League of RS, 15th (relegated)
| Home colours | Away colours |

FK Polet 1926 (Serbian Cyrillic: ФК Пoлeт 1926) is a Bosnian-Herzegovinian football club based in Brod, Republika Srpska.

The club colours are red and white.
