= Football Association of Republika Srpska =

Bosnian association football association

N/FSBIH
- Founded: 5 September 1992
- Headquarters: Banja Luka
- N/FSBIH affiliation: 2002
- President: Vico Zeljković
- Website: www.fsrs.org

The Football Association of Republika Srpska (Serbian: Фудбалски савез Републике Српске, ФСРС / Fudbalski savez Republike Srpske, FSRS) is the official football association of the Republika Srpska entity of Bosnia and Herzegovina.

It organizes the national cup, the domestic league which forms one of the two second-tier divisions below the national top division. The FSRS also has a national team that represents Republika Srpska in only friendly matches. The association was founded in 1992 and supervises over 300 football clubs throughout Republika Srpska, that includes a staff of 600 coaches, and a referee association with 1,200 members.

The association also has a youth system, with financial support to youth teams and building new football schools. Its structure is identical with other national football associations, but currently acts as a subdivision within Bosnia and Herzegovina's FA.

== History ==
It was formed on 5 September 1992 by the government of Republika Srpska, one of the two political entities of Bosnia and Herzegovina. The main goal of the FSRS was to be recognized internationally as an independent association, with their clubs being able to compete in the First League of FR Yugoslavia. After the failure to join the newly formed Yugoslav League (consisting of clubs from Serbia and Montenegro), the association continued to boycott Bosnia's League and planned that it would be able to compete in international competitions as an independent association in the future. A separate league system, the First League of the Republika Srpska, was established in 1995, where all Republika Srpska-based first level clubs competed. The Republic of Srpska national team played their first official match at the City Stadium in Banja Luka on 20 December 1992, when the rival to the Srpska team was the national team of the Republic of Srpska Krajina. This match ended without the winner, with 1:1.The Republic of Srpska scored the first goal in the 16th minute thanks to Nešković and the final 1:1 were scored in the 45th minute by Žorić. Tihomir Žorić, then playing for Dinara from Knin, was chosen the best player of this friendly match. This historical match of the Srpska team drew a lot of attention, and in spite of the ongoing war, there were about 2,000 spectators at the FC Borac stadium.

REPUBLIC OF SRPSKA - REPUBLIC OF SRPSKA KRAJINA 1:1 (1:1)

Scorers: 1:0 Nešković (16), 1:1 Žorić (45).

Stadium: City Stadium in Banja Luka, attendance: 2.000, referees: Ilija Gigović (Gradiška), Slobodan Micev and Ranko Dragičević from Banja Luka.

THE BEST PLAYER: Tihomir Žorić (Republika Srpska Krajina).

REPUBLIC SRPSKA: Čobanović, Malbašić, Miladinović, Lukić, Sredojević, Janjetović, Tonković, Nešković, Jagodić, Zdjelar and Trivan. Reserves: Marković, Gračanin, Vranješ, Ališić, Vojkić, Šobot, Salamić, Lukić, Kukavica, Pajić, Marić, Šarac and Gluhović.

REPUBLIC SRPSKA KRAJINA: Lj. Vučković, M. Vučković, Bogunović, Vukasin, Tica, Vrcelj, Žarković, Božić, Pribićević, Njegić, Žorić. Reserves: Nedimić, Bjelivuk, Tatić, Božić, Dragišić, Šorgić, Botić, Cugalj.

After the conflict in Bosnia ended, the Bosnian league was split into three ethnically-based sections. The Football Association of Bosnia and Herzegovina, NSBiH, created to represent all three organisations, was recognised by the world football governing body FIFA in 1996 and UEFA in 1998. As the Bosniak football federation was the only one to join, its clubs alone were allowed to compete internationally and contest the newly formed Premier League of Bosnia and Herzegovina.

The Bosnian Croat association, Herceg-Bosna Football Federation, joined up with the NSBiH to form the Football Association of The Federation of Bosnia and Herzegovina in April 2000 but the RS league continued to press for separate international recognition. On 23 May 2002 the FSRS finally joined the NSBiH as well, resulting in a league with teams from the entire country. The previous RS First League became a second level competition. The former RS Football federation vice president Slobodan Tešić said that "Its in the interest of us all, including our teams," stressing that the Bosnian Serbs teams had suffered the most during the years of division due to limited competition. In a joint statement, UEFA and FIFA hailed the move as being "for the good of football in Bosnia-Herzegovina and, in particular, for the development of football in Republika Srpska".

== First League Champions ==
The association had its own Championship since 1995. The First League of the Republika Srpska which is the top tier is played in a league system where clubs meet all other in two rounds twice, once as host another as visitor being at the end the club with the major number of points proclaimed the Champion of Republika Srpska. After 2002 the top clubs of the First league are promoted to the Premier League of Bosnia and Herzegovina. Currently, the First League of RS and the First League of FBiH form the second national tier of Bosnia and Herzegovina league system. For more information on the current format look into Bosnia's Premier League of Bosnia and Herzegovina. Below are the results from the seven seasons before the merge. Note none of these champions were recognized by FIFA or UEFA and could not participate in any European club competitions.

Season	Champion	Runners Up	Top Goalscorer	Club	Goals
1995–96	FK Boksit Milići	FK Rudar Prijedor	Siniša Đurić; Zoran Majstorović	FK FK Kozara Gradiška; FK Boksit Milići	16 Goals; 16 Goals
1996–97	FK Rudar Ugljevik	FK Sloga Trn	Mladen Zgonjanin; Marić	FK Sloga Trn; FK Glasinac Sokolac	14 Goals; 14 Goals
1997–98	FK Rudar Ugljevik	FK Borac Banja Luka	Nikola Bala	FK Rudar Ugljevik	31 Goals
1998–99	FK Radnik Bijeljina	FK Rudar Ugljevik	Mladen Zgonjanin	FK Sloga Trn	23 Goals
1999–00	FK Boksit Milići	FK Rudar Ugljevik	Nedo Zdjelar	FK Sloboda Novi Grad	29 Goals
2000–01	FK Borac Banja Luka	FK Sloboda Novi Grad	Milanko Đerić	FK Boksit Milići	26 Goals
2001–02	FK Leotar Trebinje	FK Kozara Gradiška	Pavle Delibašić; Siniša Jovanović	FK Leotar Trebinje; FK Glasinac Sokolac	21 Goals; 21 Goals

== Players ==
Name	Surname	Club
Vladan	Kovačević	Rakow
Miladin	Stevanović	Čukarički
Mihailo	Ristić	Celta
Srđan	Grahovac	Rapid Wien
Siniša	Saničanin	Partizan
Srđan	Babić	Spartak Moscow
Rade	Krunić	AC Milan
Mijat	Gaćinović	AEK Athens
Luka	Jović	AC Milan
Nemanja	Gudelj	Sevilla
Nemanja	Stevanović	Partizan
Nemanja	Jović	Free agent
Željko	Gavrić	DAC Dunajska Streda
Stojan	Vranješ	Borac Banja Luka
Ognjen	Vranješ	Čukarički
Ognjen	Ožegović	Example
Aleksandar	Subić	Borac Banja Luka
Gojko	Cimirot	Example
Bojan	Nastić	Example
Miroslav	Stevanović	Example

== List of presidents ==
A list o the presidents of the Football Association of Republika Srpska since its foundation on 5 September 1992 until the present day.

No.	President	Period
1	Branko Lazarević	5 September 1992 – 1998
2	Milan Jelić	1998 – 30 September 2007
3	Mile Kovačević	1 October 2007 – 17 December 2019
4	Vico Zeljković	24 January 2020 – present
