= FK BSK Banja Luka =

BSK Banja Luka
- Full name: Fudbalski klub BSK Banja Luka
- Nickname: Romantičari sa Čaira
- Founded: 1932
- Ground: Stadion Čaire, Banja Luka
- Capacity: 3,000
- Chairman: Aleksandar Vrhovac
- Manager: Bojan Puzigaća
- League: Premier League BH
- 2025–26: First League of RS, 1st of 13 (promoted)
Home colours	Away colours

Fudbalski klub BSK Banja Luka (Serbian Cyrillic: Фудбалски клуб БCK Бања Лука) is a professional association football club from the city of Banja Luka that is situated in Bosnia and Herzegovina. They play in the Premier League of Bosnia and Herzegovina.

BSK stands for Banjalučki sportski klub, which in literal translation means Banja Luka's Sports Club (Sports Club/Society of Banja Luka).

== History ==
Since the formation of the Bosnia and Herzegovina leagues, the club has spent most seasons in the second and third tiers of the football pyramid. From 2003 through 2006 they were named BSK Crni Đorđe and from 2006 through 2008 they were named BSK Nektar.

== Honours ==
=== Domestic ===
==== League ====
- First League of the Republika Srpska:
  - Winners (1): 2025–26

== Players ==
=== Current squad ===
As of 21 August 2026

Note: Flags indicate national team as defined under FIFA eligibility rules; some limited exceptions apply. Players may hold more than one non-FIFA nationality.

No.	Pos.	Nation	Player
2	DF	BIH	Nikola Antešević (on loan from Borac Banja Luka)
5	DF	SEN	Cherif Atab Diouf (on loan from Borac Banja Luka)
7	MF	BIH	Nedim Keranović
8	FW	BIH	Boro Erić
9	MF	BIH	Luka Misimović
10	MF	BIH	David Gavrić
11	MF	BIH	Danko Radić
13	DF	BIH	Danilo Vučenović
14	MF	SRB	Ognjen Radošević (on loan from Borac Banja Luka)
15	DF	BIH	Marko Radić
16	FW	BIH	Faruk Bezdrob
17	DF	BIH	Filip Račić
18	DF	BIH	Aleksandar Subić
19	MF	BIH	Marko Bundalo
20	DF	BIH	Zoran Kvržić (captain)
21	DF	BIH	Milijan Kovačević

No.	Pos.	Nation	Player
22	FW	BIH	David Čavić
23	FW	AUT	Miloš Savić
24	MF	BIH	Fedor Predragović
26	DF	BIH	Nebojša Runić
27	MF	BIH	Siniša Ristić
28	MF	AUT	Denis Dizdarević
30	DF	CRO	Domagoj Čulina (on loan from Borac Banja Luka)
31	GK	BIH	Srđan Modić (on loan from Borac Banja Luka)
32	MF	CRO	Juraj Ljubić (on loan from Lokomotiva Zagreb)
33	FW	MKD	Mihail Talevski
49	FW	BIH	Stefan Marčetić
55	MF	BIH	Saša Marjanović
77	GK	BIH	Aleksa Stupar
80	GK	BIH	Mirza Pajić
—	DF	BIH	Jusuf Terzić (on loan from Borac Banja Luka)
—	FW	BIH	Stefan Đurić

== Club seasons ==
Season	League									Cup	Europe
Season	Division	P	W	D	L	F	A	Pts	Pos	Cup	Europe
Current format of Premier League of Bosnia and Herzegovina
2002–03	First League of the Republika Srpska	28	11	5	12	30	34	38	7th		
2003–04	First League of the Republika Srpska	30	11	7	12	30	28	40	13th		
2004–05	First League of the Republika Srpska	30	13	4	13	42	40	43	9th		
2005–06	First League of the Republika Srpska	30	14	5	11	34	36	47	5th		
2006–07	First League of the Republika Srpska	30	11	9	10	32	33	42	10th	R2	
2007–08	First League of the Republika Srpska	30	10	8	12	42	47	38	12th		
2008–09	First League of the Republika Srpska	30	11	5	14	35	43	38	13th		
2009–10	First League of the Republika Srpska	26	11	6	9	34	26	39	3rd	R1	
2010–11	First League of the Republika Srpska	26	4	5	17	15	54	17	14th ↓	R1	
2014–15	Second League of RS – West	26	11	8	7	35	26	41	4th		
2015–16	Second League of RS – West	30	11	6	13	39	53	39	9th		
2016–17	Second League of RS – West	30	17	6	7	60	36	57	2nd		
2017–18	Second League of RS – West	30	8	7	15	37	57	31	15th ↓		
2018–19	Regional League RS - West	28	4	4	20	33	80	16	15th ↓		
2019–20	Regional League Banja Luka	12	10	1	1	44	14	31	1st ↑		
2020–21	Regional League RS - West	16	11	2	3	46	14	35	1st ↑		
2021–22	Second League of RS – West	30	8	9	13	41	54	33	12th		
2022–23	Second League of RS – West	29	20	3	6	51	29	63	2nd ↑		
2023–24	First League of the Republika Srpska	34	13	5	16	52	46	44	13th		
2024–25	First League of the Republika Srpska	34	22	5	7	67	39	71	2nd		
2025–26	First League of the Republika Srpska	29	17	6	6	46	26	57	1st ↑	R1	
