= FK Laktaši =

Laktaši
- Full name: Fudbalski klub Laktaši
- Nickname: Plavi (The Blues)
- Founded: 20 August 1958 (58 years ago)
- Ground: Gradski stadion
- Capacity: 5,000
- Owner: Laktaši
- Chairman: Miroslav Bojić
- Manager: Slobodan Starčević
- League: First League of RS
- 2025–26: First League of RS, 2nd of 13
- Website: https://fklaktasi.com/
| Home colours | Away colours |

Fudbalski klub Laktaši (Serbian Cyrillic: Фудбалски клуб Лакташи) is a professional association football club based in the city of Laktaši, Republika Srpska, Bosnia and Herzegovina. It competes in the First League of the Republika Srpska, the second-tier competition in Bosnia and Herzegovina.

The club was originally founded in 1974, in order to replace the former LSK (Laktaški Sportski Klub), founded in 1958. They play their matches at the Gradski stadium, which has capacity of 5,000 seats.

The club's biggest success was winning the First League of the Republika Srpska in the 2006–07 season and earning promotion to Premier League of Bosnia and Herzegovina. They managed to repeat this in the 2024–25 season, but failed to obtain a license to compete in the Bosnian Premier League.

== History ==
=== Origins and early years (1958–1968) ===
The club was founded in 1958. Football was the favorite free-time activity of local inhabitants. Miloš Vrančić and Branko Banjac, two football passionates, came up with an idea to form a football club in the town. On 30 August 1958, the constituent assembly was held and new football club was created. It got the name LSK (Laktaški sportski klub) and it was founded on the initiative of FK Partizan.

The first generation of players of LSK was formed by: Miloš Vrančić, Branko Jakovljević, Jovo Malešević, Slobodan Trninić, Miroslav Vrančić, Nenad Trninić, Nebojša Popović, Miloš Sajić, Vlatko Misija and Vlado Vranješ. The first match ever played was against FK Sloga at home and ended 4–4. Due to the fact that most of the town's youth was going to study in universities throughout the country, the club was dissolved in 1968.

=== Rebirth in 1974 ===
Tomislav Davidović and Branko Banjac were decisive in reforming the club. Other people that gave their contribution to this goal were Mladen Srdić and Munib Ganibegović, who helped preparing the administration and all necessary documentation. Đuro Malešević wrote the first Regulations and Statute. The Renewing Board assembly was held on 17 June 1974. The first Executive Council members to be elected were Miljo Samardžić, Duško Knežević, Srboljub Jeftić, Đuro Malešević and Branko Banjac. It was decided that new football club would be named FK Laktaši (Fudbalski Klub Laktaši).

=== Golden era (2003–2010) ===
In the 2002–03 season, under Vlado Jagodić, Laktaši won the Third league and joined the Second League of the Republika Srpska. Jagodić walked through the Second league in the 2003–04 season and got promoted to the First League of Republika Srpska. The club was finishing as middle-placed until the 2006–07 season when Jagodić led the team to become the champions of Republika Srpska for the first time in the club's history and got promoted to Premier League of Bosnia and Herzegovina, the highest football competition in the country.

==== Bosnian Premier League (2007–2010) ====
Laktaši played their first Premier League match in against Slavija and went home with 0–0 whereas in the second and first home match in new competition, they defeated Travnik 3–1. Laktaši also reached the quarter-finals of the 2007–08 Bosnian Cup. At the end of season, the team finished in the middle of league table.

In the 2008–09 season, the club continued to perform well. Surprisingly, at half-season they were third-placed. Laktaši finished the season in eighth place. The biggest win that year was 4–0 at home against Čelik Zenica, as well as defeating local rivals Borac 1–0 away.

The first months of the 2009–10 season proved to be fatal. In 15 matches Laktaši won only 8 points, and would eventually finish in 15th, getting relegated to the First League of the Republika Srpska.

== Honours ==
=== Domestic ===
==== League ====
- First League of the Republika Srpska:
  - Winners (2): 2006–07, 2024–25
  - Runners-up (2): 2023–24, 2025–26
- Second League of the Republika Srpska
  - Winners (1): 2003–04 (west)
- Third League of the Republika Srpska
  - Winners (1): 2002–03 (west)

== Notable former players ==
For a list of current and former players with Wikipedia article, please see Category:FK Laktaši players.

== Managerial history ==
- (Bosnia and Herzegovina) Vlado Jagodić (1 July 2002 – 30 June 2007)
- (Bosnia and Herzegovina) Zoran Ćurguz (January 2008 – August 2008)
- (Serbia) Slobodan Kustudić (August 2008 – October 2008)
- (Serbia) Čedomir Đoinčević (October 2008 – 31 December 2008)
- (Bosnia and Herzegovina) Lazo Jovanić (1 January 2009 – 30 June 2009)
- (Serbia) Milan Milanović (1 July 2009 – November 2009)
- (Germany) Thomas Geist (21 January 2010 – 4 March 2010))
- (Serbia) Dragoslav Stepanović (5 March 2010 – 29 May 2010)
- (Bosnia and Herzegovina) Zdravko Gajić (1 June 2010 – 30 June 2011)
- (Bosnia and Herzegovina) Miloš Pojić (1 July 2011 – 30 June 2012)
- (Bosnia and Herzegovina) Predrag Tatić (1 July 2012 – March 2014)
- (Bosnia and Herzegovina) Miloš Pojić (March 2014 – February 2015)
- (Bosnia and Herzegovina) Miodrag Petković (February 2015 – September 2016)
- (Bosnia and Herzegovina) Miljan Bajić (September 2016 – June 2019)
- (Bosnia and Herzegovina) Željko Vranješ (June 2019 – 11 February 2020)
- (Bosnia and Herzegovina) Vlado Jagodić (11 February 2020 – 4 March 2020)
- (Bosnia and Herzegovina) Darko Maletić (6 August 2020 – 20 December 2020)
- (Bosnia and Herzegovina) Miljan Bajić (1 January 2021 – 19 August 2024)
- (Bosnia and Herzegovina) Slobodan Starčević (20 August 2024 – present)
