= FK Ljubić Prnjavor =

Ljubić Prnjavor
- Full name: Fudbalski klub Ljubić Prnjavor
- Nickname: Plavi (The Blues)
- Founded: 1946.
- Ground: Stadion “Siniša Peulić", Prnjavor
- Capacity: 2,500
- Chairman: Zoran Deket
- Manager: Nikola Zeljković
- League: First League of RS
- 2023–24: First League of RS, 11th
Home colours	Away colours

Fudbalski klub Ljubić (Serbian Cyrillic: Фудбалски клуб Љубић Пpњaвop) is a football club from the town of Prnjavor, in Republika Srpska, Bosnia and Herzegovina. The club competes in the First League of the Republika Srpska.

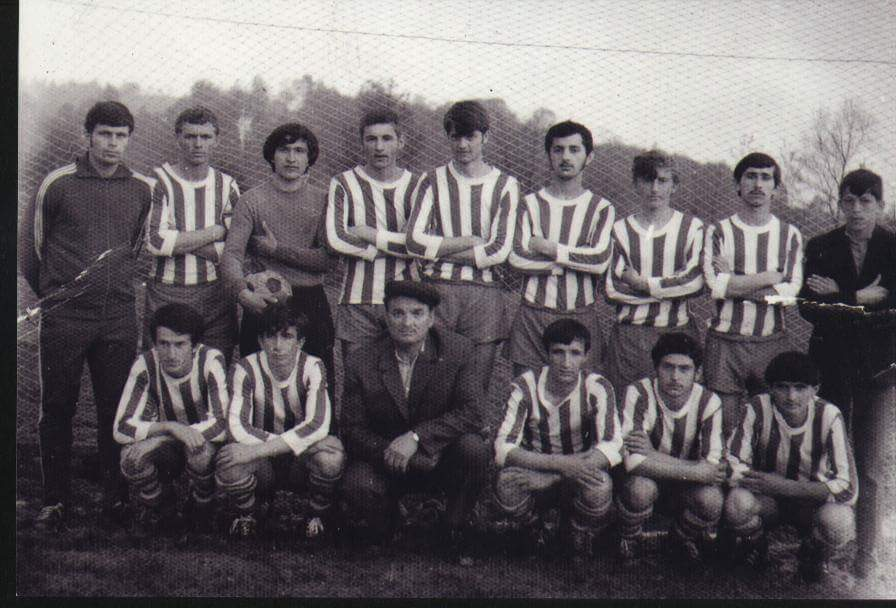
Ljubić squad in the 1969–70 season.

== Players ==
=== Current squad ===
As of 23 May 2023

Note: Flags indicate national team as defined under FIFA eligibility rules; some limited exceptions apply. Players may hold more than one non-FIFA nationality.

No.	Pos.	Nation	Player
1	GK	BIH	Nemanja Mitrović
2	DF	BIH	Stefan Radaković
3	DF	BIH	Zoran Kovačević
5	DF	BIH	Boris Žižak
6	MF	BIH	Boris Jagodić
8	MF	BIH	Jovan Milanović
9	FW	BIH	Aleksandar Žižak
10	MF	BIH	Dragan Jugović
11	MF	BIH	Duško Subić
12	GK	BIH	Mihailo Trivičević

No.	Pos.	Nation	Player
14	MF	BIH	Stefan Grahovac
16	FW	BIH	Dejan Javorać
18	MF	BIH	Andrej Bosnić
19	FW	SRB	Milos Cudić
21	MF	BIH	Stefan Cetojević
23	DF	BIH	Miljan Stupar
24	DF	BIH	Nemanja Vidović
25	MF	BIH	Milos Misić
28	DF	BIH	Luka Bobić
—	GK	BIH	Isak Badić

== HistoricaL list of managers ==
- (Bosnia and Herzegovina) Brane Janković
- (Bosnia and Herzegovina) Branimir Tulić
- (Bosnia and Herzegovina) Milan Vujasin
- (Serbia) Srboljub Nikolić
- (Bosnia and Herzegovina) Vlado Jagodić
- (Bosnia and Herzegovina) Milorad Segić
- (Bosnia and Herzegovina) Darko Maletić
- (Bosnia and Herzegovina) Nikola Zeljković
