= FK Sloboda Novi Grad =

Sloboda Novi Grad
- Full name: Fudbalski klub Sloboda Novi Grad
- Founded: 1910
- Dissolved: 2025
- Ground: Stadion Mlakve
- Capacity: 4,000
- Chairman: Mladen Bosančić
- Manager: Momčilo Stojković
- League: First League of RS
- 2021–22: 3rd
Home colours	Away colours

Fudbalski klub Sloboda Novi Grad (Serbian Cyrillic: Фудбалски клуб Cлoбoдa Hoви Гpaд) was a football club from the town of Bosanski Novi, Republika Srpska, Bosnia and Herzegovina, and one of the oldest in the country. The club competes in the First League of the Republika Srpska.

== History ==
The club was founded in 1910 as SK Sloboda Bosanski Novi, which makes them one of the oldest football clubs in Bosnia and Herzegovina. In September of 2025 it was announced the club would become defunct, club leadership attributed financial issues as the main reason for the club ending its 115 year existence.

== Players ==
=== Current squad ===
As of 23 May 2023

Note: Flags indicate national team as defined under FIFA eligibility rules; some limited exceptions apply. Players may hold more than one non-FIFA nationality.

No.	Pos.	Nation	Player
1	GK	BIH	Aleksandar Rašeta
3	DF	SRB	Sreten Atanasković
4	DF	BIH	Nemanja Vejnović
5	DF	BIH	Mateja Dodig
6	DF	BIH	Semir Tiro
7	MF	BIH	Marin Samardzić
8	MF	BIH	Mujo Smajić
9	FW	BIH	Ensar Imamagić
11	FW	BIH	Armando Bobaj
12	GK	BIH	Mladen Milosević
13	MF	RUS	Aynar Eshba

No.	Pos.	Nation	Player
14	MF	BRA	Ricardinho
16	MF	BIH	Dženis Abdulai
17	FW	BIH	Ensar Hamzić
19	MF	CAN	Saad Tareq Saad Abdelgader
20	MF	ARG	Juan Jose Fontemachi
21	MF	BIH	Mile Kovačević
22	MF	BIH	Predrag Vladić
—	DF	BIH	Ermin Sumić
—	DF	BIH	Adin Paro
—	MF	BIH	Ago Reiz
—	MF	GHA	Sampson Wirekoh

== Historical list of managers ==
- (Bosnia and Herzegovina) Milan Vujasin
- (Bosnia and Herzegovina) Mirko Tintor
- (Bosnia and Herzegovina) Milorad Inđić
- (Bosnia and Herzegovina) Ernst Šabić
- (Bosnia and Herzegovina) Zoran Kondić
- (Bosnia and Herzegovina) Ljubiša Drljača
- (Bosnia and Herzegovina) Zlatko Jelisavac
- (Bosnia and Herzegovina) Duško Vranešević
