= Second League of the Republika Srpska =

Third tier association football league, Bosnia and Herzegovina

- Founded: 1995
- Country: Bosnia and Herzegovina
- Confederation: UEFA
- Number of clubs: East – 16; West – 17
- Level on pyramid: 3
- Promotion to: First League of the Republika Srpska
- Relegation to: Regional League RS - West; Regional League RS - Center; Regional League RS - East; Regional League RS - South
- Domestic cup(s): Bosnian Cup, Republika Srpska Cup
- International cup(s): UEFA Conference League (The winner of the Bosnian Cup earns an automatic spot in the UEFA Conference League)
- Current champions: East – Zadrugar Donje Crnjelovo; West – Omarska (2024–25)
- Broadcaster(s): RTRS
- Website: Second League East & West (in Serbian)
- Current: 2025–26 Second League

The Second League of the Republika Srpska (Bosnian: Druga liga Republike Srpske; Serbian: Друга лига Републике Српске) is a third level football league competition in Bosnia and Herzegovina. It is divided into two leagues, based on geographical areas. The winner of each league is promoted to the First League of the Republika Srpska. Clubs at the bottom of the table are relegated to the respective regional leagues.

== Member clubs for 2024–25 ==
=== East (Istok) ===
- FK Budućnost Pilica
- FK Glasinac 2011
- FK Guber Srebrenica
- FK Hercegovac Bileća
- FK Ilićka 01 Brčko
- FK Jedinstvo Brodac
- FK Jedinstvo Roćević
- FK Mladost Gacko
- FK Mladost Rogatica
- FK Napredak Donji Šepak
- FK Podrinje Janja
- FK Proleter Dvorovi
- FK Rudar 1925
- FK Stakorina Čajniče
- FK Vlasenica
- FK Zadrugar Donje Crnjelovo

=== West (Zapad) ===
- FK Borac Šamac
- OFK Brdo Hambarine
- FK Čelinac
- FK Crni Vrh Jaružani
- FK Dubrave
- FK FSA Prijedor
- FK Gorica Šipovo
- OFK Lauš Banja Luka
- FK Modriča
- FK Naprijed Banja Luka
- FK Omarska
- FK Polet 1926
- FK Proleter Teslić
- FK Sloga Srbac
- FK Sloga Trn
- FK Tekstilac Derventa
- FK Željezničar Doboj
