= 2012–13 First League of the Republika Srpska =

First League of the Republika Srpska
- Season: 2012–13
- Champions: Mladost (VO); 1st First League title
- Promoted: Mladost (VO)
- Relegated: Borac Šamac; Ljubić
- Matches: 182
- Goals: 501 (2.75 per match)
- Top goalscorer: Dejan Vučić (21 goals)
- Biggest home win: Sloga Doboj 8–0 Ljubić
- Biggest away win: Borac (Š) 0–4 Podrinje
- Highest scoring: 8 goals Sloga Doboj 8–0 Ljubić
- Longest winning run: 4 matches Kozara; Modriča; Sloboda (MG)
- Longest unbeaten run: 6 matches Sloga
- Longest winless run: 10 matches Borac (Š)
- Longest losing run: 5 matches Ljubić

The 2012–13 First League of the Republika Srpska is the eighteenth season of the First League of the Republika Srpska, the second tier football league of Bosnia and Herzegovina, since its original establishment and the eleventh as a second-tier league. It will begin on 11 August 2012 and end on 25 May 2013; a winter break where no matches are played will be in effect between 3 November 2012 and 9 March 2013. Radnik were the last champions, having won their third championship title in the 2011–12 season and earning a promotion to Premier League of Bosnia and Herzegovina. This year Mladost Velika Obarska won the championship, the first time they won the First League of the Republika Srpska.

Fourteen clubs are participating in this session, ten returning from the previous session, one relegated from Premier League of Bosnia and Herzegovina, two promoted from two regional Second League of the Republika Srpska and one as a replacement for Crvena Zemlja who withdraw from the competition due to financial difficulties.

== Changes from last season ==
=== Team changes ===
==== From First League of the RS ====
Promoted to Premier League

- Radnik

Relegated to one of 2 respective regional Second League of the RS

- FK Laktaši (Second League of the RS – West)
- Proleter (Second League of the RS – West)

==== To First League of RS ====
Relegated from Premier League

- Kozara

Promoted from two regional Second League of the RS

- Borac (Š) (Second League of the RS – West)
- Mladost (VO) (Second League of the RS – East)

=== Stadions and locations ===
Location of clubs in 2012–13 Prva liga Republike Srpske

Team	Location	Stadium	Capacity
Borac	Bosanski Šamac	Gradski Stadion, Šamac	3,000
Drina HE	Višegrad	Gradski Stadion, Višegrad	1,500
Drina (Z)	Zvornik	Gradski Stadion, Zvornik	3,000
Kozara	Gradiška	Gradski Stadion, Gradiška	5,000
Ljubić	Prnjavor	Gradski Stadion Borik, Prnjavor	2,000
Mladost (G)	Gacko	Gradski Stadion, Gacko	3,500
Mladost (VO)	Velika Obarska	Gradski Stadion, Velika Obarska	1,000
Modriča	Modriča	Dr. Milan Jelić Stadium	7,600
Podrinje	Janja	Podrinje Stadium	3,000
Rudar (U)	Ugljevik	Novi Gradski Stadion, Ugljevik	8,000
Sloboda (MG)	Mrkonjić Grad	Gradski Stadion Luke, Mrkonjić Grad	2,000
Sloboda (NG)	Bosanski Novi	Mlakve Stadium	4,000
Sloga	Doboj	Luke Stadium, Doboj	2,000
Sutjeska	Foča	Gradski Stadion, Foča	4,000

=== Personnel and kits ===
Note: Flags indicate national team as has been defined under FIFA eligibility rules. Players may hold more than one non-FIFA nationality.

Team	Manager	Captain	Kit manufacturer	Shirt sponsor
Borac (Š)	(Bosnia and Herzegovina) Predrag Lukić			
Drina HE	(Bosnia and Herzegovina) Marko Vidaković		Kappa	–
Drina (Z)	(Bosnia and Herzegovina) Dragan Mićić	(Bosnia and Herzegovina) Goran Maksimović	NAAI	–
Kozara	(Bosnia and Herzegovina) Miloš Pojić	(Bosnia and Herzegovina) Srboljub Jandrić	NAAI	–
Ljubić	(Bosnia and Herzegovina) Milan Vujasin	(Bosnia and Herzegovina) Dragomir Prodanović		
Mladost (G)	(Bosnia and Herzegovina) Željko Popović		NAAI	
Mladost (VO)	(Bosnia and Herzegovina) Miroslav Milanović			
Modriča	(Bosnia and Herzegovina) Nikola Nikić	(Bosnia and Herzegovina) Đorđe Savić	Nike	Modriča Oil Refinery
Podrinje	(Bosnia and Herzegovina) Mile Lazarević	(Bosnia and Herzegovina) Muhamed Jusufović	Legea	
Rudar (U)	(Bosnia and Herzegovina) Predrag Marić		NAAI	
Sloboda (MG)	(Bosnia and Herzegovina) Zoran Dragišić	(Bosnia and Herzegovina) Draženko Miletić	Bull	HE na Vrbasu
Sloboda (NG)	(Bosnia and Herzegovina) Ljubiša Drljača	(Bosnia and Herzegovina) Zoran Lukač	Nike	–
Sloga	(Bosnia and Herzegovina) Zoran Ćurguz		Joma	Autosalon M&M
Sutjeska	(Bosnia and Herzegovina) Darko Nestorović		Asics	

=== Managerial changes ===
Team	Outgoing manager	Manner of departure	Date of vacancy	Position in table	Replaced by	Date of appointment
Modriča	(Bosnia and Herzegovina) Drago Svitlica	Promoted	12 June 2012	Off-season	(Bosnia and Herzegovina) Nikola Nikić	12 June 2012
Sutjeska Foča	(Bosnia and Herzegovina) Darko Vojvodić	Promoted	26 June 2012	Off-season	(Bosnia and Herzegovina) Dragan Radović	26 June 2012
Sutjeska Foča	(Bosnia and Herzegovina) Dragan Radović	Sacked	September 2012	11th	(Bosnia and Herzegovina) Darko Nestorović	13 September 2012
Ljubić	(Bosnia and Herzegovina) Predrag Šobot	Sacked	December 2012	13th	(Bosnia and Herzegovina) Mile Vujasin	15 January 2013

== Season events ==
=== FK Crvena Zemlja withdrawal ===
On 17 July 2012, Crvena Zemlja announced that they will withdraw from the First League of the Republika Srpska due to financial difficulties. There were many proposals who should replace them, but in the end, Ljubić were placed as the replacement. They finished fourth in 2011–12 Second League of the Republika Srpska - West.

== League table ==
Pos	Team	Pld	W	D	L	GF	GA	GD	Pts	Promotion or relegation
1	Mladost Velika Obarska (C, P)	26	15	5	6	51	31	+20	50	Promotion to Premijer Liga BIH
2	Sloboda Mrkonjić Grad	26	12	7	7	35	22	+13	43	
3	Kozara	26	13	4	9	42	39	+3	43	
4	Sloga Doboj	26	12	6	8	46	29	+17	42	
5	Podrinje	26	12	5	9	44	26	+18	41	
6	Drina Višegrad	26	11	4	11	29	31	−2	37	
7	Modriča	26	11	3	12	39	39	0	36	
8	Sloboda Novi Grad	26	11	3	12	32	35	−3	36	
9	Mladost Gacko	26	10	6	10	33	41	−8	36	
10	Drina Zvornik	26	9	8	9	39	38	+1	35	
11	Sutjeska Foča	26	8	7	11	26	21	+5	31	
12	Rudar Ugljevik	26	9	3	14	30	45	−15	30	
13	Borac Šamac (R)	26	7	7	12	28	45	−17	28	Qualification to relegation play-off
14	Ljubić (R)	26	5	6	15	27	59	−32	21	Relegation to Second League RS

Source: FSRS (in Bosnian)
Rules for classification: 1st points; 2nd goal difference; 3rd goals scored
For deciding champions, qualification to higher rank and relegation: 1st points; 2nd head-to-head points; 3rd head-to-head goal difference; 4th head-to-head goals scored; 5th head-to-head away goals scored; 6th goal difference; 7th goals scored
(C) Champions; (P) Promoted; (R) Relegated

=== Positions by round ===
Promotion to 2013–14 PL BiH
Qualification to relegation play-offs
Relegation to 2013–14 Druga Liga RS

Team ╲ Round	1	2	3	4	5	6	7	8	9	10	11	12	13	14	15	16	17	18	19	20	21	22	23	24	25	26
Borac Šamac	14	9	11	9	12	13	13	13	13	14	14	14	14	13	13	13	13	13	13	13	13	13	12	12	12	13
Drina Višegrad	6	11	12	13	13	11	12	11	12	10	11	11	11	11	12	10	11	11	10	11	10	10	10	8	6	6
Drina Zvornik	4	4	6	5	8	4	4	5	9	9	8	8	8	9	9	9	9	8	7	6	8	8	8	7	8	10
Kozara	2	2	1	2	1	2	2	2	6	6	7	7	6	3	1	1	1	4	4	4	5	6	5	4	4	3
Ljubić	12	14	14	14	14	14	14	14	14	13	13	13	13	14	14	14	14	14	14	14	14	14	14	14	14	14
Mladost Gacko	5	7	8	7	4	5	3	4	2	5	4	5	7	7	6	7	8	9	8	9	6	9	9	10	10	9
Mladost Velika Obarska	7	3	2	1	3	6	7	6	3	1	3	3	2	5	2	2	3	2	1	1	1	1	1	1	1	1
Modriča	3	8	4	3	5	7	8	7	4	2	4	4	5	2	5	6	7	7	9	7	9	4	6	9	9	7
Podrinje	10	12	13	10	9	10	9	9	8	8	9	9	9	8	8	5	5	5	5	5	7	7	7	6	5	5
Rudar Ugljevik	13	13	9	12	10	12	10	12	10	11	10	10	10	10	10	11	10	10	12	12	12	12	13	13	13	12
Sloboda Mrkonjić Grad	8	5	7	4	7	3	6	8	7	7	6	6	3	1	3	3	4	3	2	2	2	3	3	3	3	2
Sloboda Novi Grad	1	1	3	6	2	1	1	1	1	4	1	1	1	4	7	8	6	6	6	8	4	5	4	5	7	8
Sloga Doboj	9	10	5	8	6	8	5	3	5	3	2	2	4	6	4	4	2	1	3	3	3	2	2	2	2	4
Sutjeska Foča	11	6	10	11	11	9	11	10	11	12	12	12	12	12	11	12	12	12	11	10	11	11	11	11	11	11

Updated to match(es) played on 25 March 2013. Source: SportSport.ba

== Results ==
Home \ Away	BOŠ	DRV	DRZ	KOZ	LJU	MVO	MLA	MOD	POD	RUG	SMG	SNG	SLO	SUT
Borac Šamac		3–1	1–1	1–2	3–1	0–3	2–0	3–0	0–4	1–0	1–1	1–0	3–1	1–1
Drina Višegrad	1–1		2–1	0–1	0–1	3–1	1–0	1–0	1–0	1–3	1–0	4–0	0–1	0–0
Drina Zvornik	1–1	0–1		4–0	6–0	1–2	2–1	3–2	1–1	2–1	1–1	2–1	1–1	0–0
Kozara	3–1	4–1	1–2		4–0	2–2	2–0	1–3	1–1	2–1	2–1	3–0	2–2	1–0
Ljubić	1–1	0–2	1–3	3–0		1–1	0–1	1–2	2–2	2–0	1–0	1–2	1–2	0–2
Mladost Velika Obarska	2–1	1–1	2–0	4–1	1–1		2–1	3–0	4–2	4–0	1–1	2–3	2–1	1–0
Mladost Gacko	4–1	2–0	2–2	2–1	2–2	4–3		3–2	1–0	2–2	2–1	1–1	2–1	2–0
Modriča	3–0	3–2	4–0	2–1	2–1	0–3	1–1		1–3	1–0	0–2	3–0	0–0	3–1
Podrinje	1–0	0–1	1–1	3–1	4–0	0–1	3–0	1–2		2–1	5–0	1–3	2–1	1–0
Rudar Ugljevik	2–2	3–1	2–1	1–3	1–5	4–1	0–0	3–2	1–0		1–0	1–0	1–3	1–0
Sloboda Mrkonjić Grad	2–0	0–1	4–1	3–0	2–2	1–0	1–0	3–1	1–0	4–0		3–0	1–0	2–0
Sloboda Novi Grad	3–0	3–1	2–1	0–1	3–0	0–1	3–0	2–1	0–2	3–0	1–1		1–1	1–0
Sloga Doboj	3–0	2–1	4–1	1–1	8–0	2–1	5–0	1–0	1–4	2–1	0–0	3–0		0–3
Sutjeska Foča	4–0	1–1	0–1	1–2	5–0	1–3	3–0	0–0	1–1	1–0	0–0	1–0	1–0	

Updated to match(es) played on 24 March 2013. Source: FSRS
Legend: Blue = home team win; Yellow = draw; Red = away team win.

=== Clubs season-progress ===
Team ╲ Round	1	2	3	4	5	6	7	8	9	10	11	12	13	14	15	16	17	18	19	20	21	22	23	24	25	26
Borac Šamac	L	W	L	D	L	L	D	D	L	L	D	L	W	W	D	L	W	L	D	D	W	L	W	L	W	L
Drina Višegrad	D	L	L	D	D	W	L	W	L	W	L	L	L	W	L	W	L	D	W	L	W	W	W	W	W	L
Drina Zvornik	W	D	D	W	L	W	D	D	L	L	W	L	W	D	L	W	L	W	W	D	D	D	L	W	L	L
Kozara	W	W	W	L	W	L	W	L	L	W	D	L	W	W	W	W	D	L	L	L	D	L	W	D	W	W
Ljubić	L	L	L	L	L	W	L	D	L	W	L	W	D	L	L	L	D	L	W	W	L	D	D	L	L	D
Mladost Gacko	W	L	D	W	W	D	W	L	W	D	D	W	L	L	W	L	D	L	W	L	W	L	L	D	L	W
Mladost Velika Obarska	D	W	W	W	L	L	L	W	W	W	L	W	D	L	W	W	L	W	W	W	D	W	W	D	W	D
Modriča	W	L	W	W	L	D	L	W	W	W	W	L	L	W	L	L	D	D	L	W	L	W	L	L	L	W
Podrinje	L	L	L	W	W	L	W	D	W	L	L	D	W	W	W	W	D	W	L	L	D	D	L	W	W	W
Rudar Ugljevik	L	L	W	L	W	L	W	L	W	L	D	L	W	L	D	L	W	L	L	L	W	L	L	D	W	W
Sloboda Mrkonjić Grad	D	W	D	W	L	W	L	L	W	L	W	W	W	W	L	W	L	W	D	W	L	D	D	D	W	D
Sloboda Novi Grad	W	W	D	L	W	W	W	L	D	D	W	W	L	L	L	L	W	W	L	L	W	L	W	L	L	L
Sloga Doboj	D	D	W	L	W	L	W	W	D	W	D	W	L	L	W	W	W	D	L	W	L	W	W	D	L	L
Sutjeska Foča	L	W	L	L	D	W	L	W	L	L	D	D	L	D	W	L	D	D	W	W	L	W	L	W	L	D

Source: FSRS
W = Win; D = Draw; L = Lose

== Season statistics ==
=== Transfers ===
For the list of transfers involving First League clubs during 2012–13 season, please see: List of Bosnia and Herzegovina football transfers summer 2012 and List of Bosnia and Herzegovina football transfers winter 2012–13.

=== Top goalscorers ===
Updated 25 May 2013.

Rank	Player	Club	Goals
1	(Bosnia and Herzegovina) Dejan Vučić	Podrinje	21
2	(Bosnia and Herzegovina) Neđo Šuka	Mladost (VO) / Sutjeska	15
3	(Bosnia and Herzegovina) Ljuban Antonić	Sloboda (NG)	13
4	(Bosnia and Herzegovina) Slaviša Todorović	Rudar Ugljevik	12
5	(Bosnia and Herzegovina) Mirza Hasanović	Borac Šamac	10
5	(Bosnia and Herzegovina) Zlatko Đorić	Sloga Doboj	10
5	(Bosnia and Herzegovina) Rajko Ćeranić	Mladost Gacko	10
5	(Serbia) Aleksandar Vasiljević	Mladost (VO)	10
5	(Bosnia and Herzegovina) Aleksandar Malbašić	Kozara	10

=== Hat-tricks ===
Updated 24 March 2013.

Player	For	Against	Result	Date
(Bosnia and Herzegovina) Dejan Vučić	Podrinje	Borac Šamac	4–0	8 September 2012
(Bosnia and Herzegovina) Dejan Vučić	Podrinje	Sloboda Mrkonjić Grad	5–0	23 September 2012
(Bosnia and Herzegovina) Zlatko Đorić	Sloga Doboj	Mladost (G)	5–0	29 September 2012
(Bosnia and Herzegovina) Saša Stijepić	Sloboda (MG)	Drina (Z)	4–1	6 October 2012
(Bosnia and Herzegovina) Vladimir Deket	Ljubić	Rudar Ugljevik	5–1	13 April 2013
(Bosnia and Herzegovina) Neđo Šuka	Sutjeska	Borac (Š)	4–0	18 May 2013
(Bosnia and Herzegovina) Ivan Mirković	Drina HE	Sloboda (NG)	4–0	18 May 2013

== See also ==
- 2011–12 First League of the Republika Srpska
- 2012–13 Republika Srpska Cup
- 2012–13 Second League of the Republika Srpska
- 2012–13 First League of the Federation of Bosnia and Herzegovina
- 2012–13 Premier League of Bosnia and Herzegovina
- 2012–13 Bosnia and Herzegovina Football Cup
- Football Federation of Bosnia and Herzegovina
