= 2012–13 Bosnia and Herzegovina Football Cup =

Tournament details
- Country: Bosnia and Herzegovina
- Teams: 32

Final positions
- Champions: Široki Brijeg
- Runners-up: Željezničar

Tournament statistics
- Matches played: 46
- Goals scored: 113 (2.46 per match)
- Attendance: 42,600 (926 per match)
- Top goal scorer(s): 6 goals Igor Aničić; Wagner

The 2012–13 Bosnia and Herzegovina Football Cup was the 18th season of Bosnia and Herzegovina's annual football cup, and a 13th season of the unified competition. The winner qualified for the second qualifying round of the 2013–14 UEFA Europa League.

The defending champions Željezničar – having won their 5th title the previous year by defeating Široki Brijeg in the final with an aggregate score of 1–0 – were not able to defend their title with Široki Brijeg being the new champions after a 2–2 aggregate score claiming the title only after penalties (5–4 for Široki Brijeg). This is their second cup title.

All top 16 clubs entered from the round of 32.

== Participating clubs ==
The following 32 teams competed in Round of 32 (the club in bold is the champion):

**2012–13 Premier League** all clubs	**2012–13 Prva liga RS** six clubs	**2012 Federation of Bosnia and Herzegovina Cup** ten clubs
Borac; Čelik; GOŠK; Gradina; Leotar; Olimpic; Radnik; Rudar Prijedor; Sarajevo; Slavija; **Široki Brijeg**; Travnik; Velež; Zrinjski; Zvijezda; Željezničar	Drina HE; Modriča; Rudar Ugljevik; Sloboda (MG); Sloga; Sutjeska	Branitelj – (2012–13 First League of the Federation of BiH); Čapljina – (2012–13 First League of the Federation of BiH); NK Vitez – (2012–13 First League of the Federation of BiH); Podgrmeč - (2012–13 First League of the Federation of BiH); Orašje - (2012–13 Second League of the Federation of BiH); Tomislav - (2012–13 Second League of the Federation of BiH); Mladost (DS) - (2012–13 Second League of the Federation of BiH); Famos SAŠK Napredak - (2012–13 Second League of the Federation of BiH); Rudar Zenica - (2012–13 League of Zenica-Doboj Canton (IV level); Rijeka - (2012–13 First League of Central Bosnia Canton (IV level)

^{1} Of the 32 participants, the Federation of Bosnia and Herzegovina has 21 clubs, while the Republika of Srpska has 11. Brčko District has no representatives.

== Calendar ==
Round	Date(s)	number of fixtures	Clubs	New entries this round
Round of 32	19 September 2012	16	32 → 16	none
Round of 16	03 and 24 October 2012	8	16 → 8	none
Quarterfinals	7 and 21 November 2012	4	8 → 4	none
Semifinals	13 March and 3 April 2013	2	4 → 2	none
Final	30 April and 14 May 2013	1	2 → 1	none

== Draw ==
The draws for the round of 32 were conducted in Sarajevo at 12:00 (CEST) on 6 September 2012 in hotel "Park", Vogošća. All 32 clubs were in the same pot, resulting that every club could get any other club as his opponent. The first-drawn team served as the host. Also, the date for the matches was decided to be on 19 September 2012.

It was announced on 20 September that the draw for round of 16 will be conducted on 25 September 2012 at 12:00 (CEST) in hotel "Art", Sarajevo. The 16 clubs who advanced from round of 32 were set in the same pot making every fixture possible and unlike the previous round, this time the club who advance further will be decided by a two-legged fixture. The matches initially were scheduled for 03 and 17 October 2012, but the second leg was later rescheduled for 24 October, because the Bosnia and Herzegovina national football team played on 16 October.

The draws for quarterfinals were done on 30 October at 12:00 CEST in the halls of Football Federation of Bosnia and Herzegovina in Sarajevo. The draw was absolute, which means every fixtures was possible and, just like the last round, the club who proceeds to the semifinals was decided by a two-legged fixture. The date for the matches was decided to be on 07 and 21 November 2012.

The draw for semifinals took part after the winter break, on 5 March 2013 at 12:00 CET in the halls of Football Federation of Bosnia and Herzegovina in Sarajevo. Once again, there were no seeding which made every fixture possible. The teams who will play in the finals will be decided by a two-legged fixture with the first leg on 13 March and the second one on 3 April 2013.

== Competition ==
=== Round of 32 ===
This round consisted of 16 single-legged fixtures. All 32 clubs entered the competition from this round, while the matches were scheduled for 19 September 2012, with one match on 18 September. In a case of a draw in the regular time, the winner was determined with a penalty shootout.

Tie no	Home team	Score	Away team
1	Modriča (II)	0–1	Orašje (III)
2	Travnik (I)	1–3	GOŠK (I)
3	Sloboda (MG) (II)	0–3	Željezničar (I)
4	Sarajevo (I)	1–0	Gradina (I)
5	Čelik (I)	2–1	Podgrmeč (II)
6	Branitelj (II)	0–2	Široki Brijeg (I)
7	Rijeka (IV)	2–1	Drina HE (II)
8	Rudar Prijedor (I)	0–1	Zrinjski (I)
9	Sloga (II)	4–0	Tomislav (III)
10	Radnik (I)	6–0	Rudar Zenica (IV)
11	Velež (I)	3–0	Mladost (DS) (III)
12	Olimpic (I)	0–0 (3–0 pen.)	NK Vitez (II)
13	Sutjeska (II)	1–0	Famos SAŠK Napredak (III)
14	Leotar (I)	0–1	Slavija (I)
15	Zvijezda (I)	5–0	Rudar Ugljevik (II)
16	Čapljina (II)	1–1 (3–1 pen.)	Borac (I)

Note: Roman numerals in brackets denote the league tier the clubs participate in during the 2012–13 season.
Source: SportSport.ba

- one leg only
- penalties used if needed, no extra-time

18 September 2012	Sarajevo	1–0	Gradina	Sarajevo
19:30 CEST	Hadžić 45+1'	Report		Stadium: Asim Ferhatović Hase; Attendance: 1,000; Referee: Ognjen Valjić (Banja Luka)

19 September 2012	Modriča	0–1	Orašje	Modriča
16:00 CEST		Report	Kobaš 43'	Stadium: Dr. Milan Jelić; Attendance: 100; Referee: Dragan Petrović (Banja Luka)

19 September 2012	Travnik	1–3	GOŠK	Travnik
16:00 CEST	Mahir 67'	Report	Jusufbašič 11'; Bekić 13'; Perić 54'	Stadium: Pirota; Attendance: 200; Referee: Ilija Živković (Orašje)

19 September 2012	Sloboda (MG)	0–3	Željezničar	Mrkonjić Grad
16:00 CEST		Report	Adilović 38'; Zeba 53'; Brković 63'	Stadium: Gradski Stadion Luke; Attendance: 1,200; Referee: Dragan Skakić (Bosanska Gradiška)

19 September 2012	Čelik	2–1	Podgrmeč	Zenica
16:00 CEST	Čolić 56'; Kajkut 66'	Report	Seferovič 90+2'	Stadium: Kamberović Polje; Attendance: 1000; Referee: Elvis Mujić (Banovići)

19 September 2012	Branitelj	0–2	Široki Brijeg	Rodoč
16:00 CEST		Report	Wagner 31'; Ćorić 75'	Stadium: SC Rodoč; Attendance: 500; Referee: Vladimir Bjelica (I. Sarajevo)

19 September 2012	Rijeka	2–1	Drina HE	Vitez
16:00 CEST	Vujica 42' (pen.), 60'	Report	Mirković 30'	Stadium: NK Rijeka; Attendance: 300; Referee: Vedran Zovko (Mostar)

19 September 2012	Rudar Prijedor	0–1	Zrinjski	Prijedor
16:00 CEST		Report	Aničić 88'	Stadium: Gradski; Attendance: 1,000; Referee: Edin Jakupović (Bihać)

19 September 2012	Sloga	4–0	Tomislav	Doboj
16:00 CEST	Lukić 11', 22', 41'; Panić 16'	Report		Stadium: Luke; Attendance: 200; Referee: Zoran Grbić (Prijedor)

19 September 2012	Radnik	6–0	Rudar Zenica	Bijeljina
16:00 CEST	Kapetan 13', 28', 56', 75'; Ćulum 37'; Takovac 84'	Report		Stadium: Gradski; Attendance: 100; Referee: Danijel Bojo (Kiseljak)

19 September 2012	Velež	3–0	Mladost (DS)	Mostar
16:00 CEST	Hebibović 24'; Hajdarević 79'; Mace 81'	Report		Stadium: Vrapčići; Attendance: 300; Referee: Irfan Peljto (Sarajevo)

19 September 2012	Olimpic	0–0 (3–0 p)	NK Vitez	Sarajevo
16:00 CEST		Report		Stadium: Otoka; Attendance: 100; Referee: Antoni Bandić (Grude)
	Penalties
	Bučan (penalty scored); Vidović (penalty scored); Regoje (penalty scored)		(penalty missed) Hasanović; (penalty missed) Jurić; (penalty missed) Mišić

19 September 2012	Leotar	0–1	Slavija	Trebinje
16:00 CEST		Report	Rašević 72'	Stadium: Police; Attendance: 300; Referee: Emir Alečković (Sarajevo)

19 September 2012	Zvijezda	5–0	Rudar Ugljevik	Gradačac
16:00 CEST	Milanović 9'; Vehabović 43'; Autogol 58'; Džafić 60'; Delić 80'	Report		Stadium: Banja Ilidža; Attendance: 300; Referee: Adis Mulahasanović (Sarajevo)

19 September 2012	Čapljina	1–1 (3–1 p)	Borac	Čapljina
16:00 CEST	Džananović 71'	Report	Kantar 63'	Stadium: Bjelave; Attendance: 150; Referee: Goran Paradžik (Ljubuški)
	Penalties
	Drežnjak (penalty scored); Rozić (penalty scored); Kozica (penalty missed); Vila (penalty scored)		(penalty missed) Krunić; (penalty missed) Grahovac; (penalty scored) Raspudić; (penalty missed) Žižović

19 September 2012	Sutjeska	1–0	Famos SAŠK Napredak	Foča
19:00 CEST	Simić 26'	Report		Stadium: Gradski; Attendance: 200; Referee: Zoran Soknić (I. Sarajevo)

=== Round of 16 ===
The 16 winners continued their way to the final through this round. Unlike the last round, this round consisted of 8 two-legged fixtures. The dates for the matches were determined with the draw which was held on 25 September, while the matches took place on 03 and 24 October 2012.

Team 1	Agg.	Team 2	1st leg	2nd leg
Zvijezda (I)	4–2	Velež (I)	1–2	3–0
Zrinjski (I)	4–3	Sarajevo (I)	3–1	1–2
Orašje (III)	0–7	Široki Brijeg (I)	0–6	0–1
GOŠK (I)	1–0	Radnik (I)	1–0	0–0
Sutjeska (II)	2–3	Sloga (II)	1–1	1–2
Čelik (I)	3–0	Rijeka (IV)	2–0	1–0
Slavija (I)	1–6	Željezničar (I)	1–3	0–3
Olimpic (I)	0–0 (4–1 pen.)	Čapljina (II)	0–0	0–0

^{1} Roman numerals in brackets denote the league tier the clubs participate in during the 2012–13 season.
Source: SportSport.ba

- two legs
- away goals rule applied if score is level after 180 minutes
- penalties used if needed, no extra-time

==== First leg ====
3 October 2012	Zvijezda	1–2	Velež	Gradačac
15:30 CEST	Džafić 85' (pen.)	Rerpot	Okić 5', 54'	Stadium: Banja Ilidža; Attendance: 500; Referee: Ognjen Valjić (Banja Luka)

3 October 2012	Orašje	0–6	Široki Brijeg	Orašje
15:30 CEST		Report	Barišić 13'; Wagner 25'; Ćorić 32'; Bajano 47'; Džidić 54'; Kožul 90'	Stadium: NC Goal; Attendance: 300; Referee: Danijel Bojo (Kiseljak)

3 October 2012	GOŠK	1–0	Radnik	Gabela
15:30 CEST	Jusufbašić 87'	Report		Stadium: Podavala; Attendance: 100; Referee: Adis Mulahasanović (Sarajevo)

3 October 2012	Čelik	2–0	Rijeka	Zenica
15:30 CEST	Barać 32'; Kajkut 38'	Report		Stadium: Bilino Polje; Attendance: 300; Referee: Irfan Peljto (Sarajevo)

3 October 2012	Slavija	1–3	Željezničar	Lukavica, Istočno Sarajevo
15:30 CEST	Rašević 7'	Report	Adilović 17', 43'; Bekrić 74'	Stadium: Gradski SRC Slavija; Attendance: 600; Referee: Dragan Skakić (Bosanska Gradiška)

3 October 2012	Olimpic	0–0	Čapljina	Sarajevo
15:30 CEST		Report		Stadium: Otoka; Attendance: 150; Referee: Elvis Mujić (Banovići)

3 October 2012	Zrinjski	3–1	Sarajevo	Mostar
17:00 CEST	Aničić 23', 54', 70'	Report	Nuhanović 82'	Stadium: Bijeli Brijeg; Attendance: 3,500; Referee: Predrag Stankić (Bijeljina)

3 October 2012	Sutjeska	1–1	Sloga	Foča
18:30 CEST	Simić 19'	Report	Lukić 2'	Stadium: Gradski; Attendance: 250; Referee: Vedran Zovko (Mostar)

==== Second leg ====
23 October 2012	Željezničar	3–0 (6–1 agg.)	Slavija	Sarajevo
18:00 CEST	Selimović 22', 40'; Svitlica 34' (o.g.)	Report		Stadium: Grbavica; Attendance: 3,000; Referee: Ilija Živković (Orašje)

24 October 2012	Velež	0–3 (2–4 agg.)	Zvijezda	Mostar
15:00 CEST		Report	Vehabović 68', 90'; Pandža 76'	Stadium: Vrapčići; Attendance: 200; Referee: Adis Mulahasanović (Sarajevo)

24 October 2012	Široki Brijeg	1–0 (7–0 agg.)	Orašje	Široki Brijeg
15:00 CEST	Kordić 68'	Report		Stadium: Pecara; Attendance: 300; Referee: Dragan Petrović (Banja Luka)

24 October 2012	Radnik	0–0 (0–1 agg.)	GOŠK	Bijeljina
15:00 CEST		Report		Stadium: Gradski; Attendance: 300; Referee: Elvis Mujić (Banovići)

24 October 2012	Sloga	2–1 (3–2 agg.)	Sutjeska	Doboj
15:00 CEST	Panić 34'; Lukić 40' (pen.)	Report	Muminović 90'	Stadium: Luke; Attendance: 200; Referee: Admir Šehović (Sarajevo)

24 October 2012	Rijeka	0–1 (0–3 agg.)	Čelik	Vitez
15:00 CEST		Report	Travančić 80'	Stadium: NK Rijeka; Attendance: 500; Referee: Antoni Bandić (Grude)

24 October 2012	Čapljina	0–0 (0–0 agg.) (1–4 p)	Olimpic	Čapljina
15:00 CEST		Report		Stadium: Bjelave; Attendance: 250; Referee: Husein Terzić (Travnik)
	Penalties
	Drežnjak (penalty scored); Rozić (penalty missed); Kozica (penalty missed)		(penalty scored) Bučan; (penalty scored) Đurić; (penalty scored) Regoje; (penalty scored) Karić

24 October 2012	Sarajevo	2–1 (3–4 agg.)	Zrinjski	Sarajevo
17:00 CEST	Hadžić 30', 90+1'	Report	Aničić 36'	Stadium: Asim Ferhatović Hase; Attendance: 3,000; Referee: Dragan Skakić (Bosanska Gradiška)

=== Quarterfinals ===
The eight winners from the previous round met their new opponents in this round on the way to the final. This round consisted of 4 two-legged fixtures. The date for the matches were determined with the draw which was held on 30 October with the first match taking place on 6 November, while the rematch was scheduled two weeks after, on 21 November 2012.

Team 1	Agg.	Team 2	1st leg	2nd leg
Zvijezda (I)	3–5	Zrinjski (I)	3–2	0–3
Široki Brijeg (I)	2–2 (5–4 pen.)	Čelik (I)	1–1	1–1
Olimpic (I)	0–4	Željezničar (I)	0–1	0–3
GOŠK (I)	2–3	Sloga (II)	1–2	1–1

^{1} Roman numerals in brackets denote the league tier the clubs participate in during the 2012–13 season.
Source: NFSBiH

- two legs
- away goals rule applied if score is level after 180 minutes
- penalties used if needed, no extra-time

==== First leg ====
6 November 2012	Zvijezda	3–2	Zrinjski	Gradačac
13:30 CET	Savić 36' (pen.); Vehabović 41'; Pandža 56'	Report	Marjanović 20'; Radeljić 70'	Stadium: Banja Ilidža; Attendance: 500; Referee: Dragan Skakić (Bosanska Gradiška)

7 November 2012	Olimpic	0–1	Željezničar	Sarajevo
13:30 CET		Report	Bekrić 87'	Stadium: Otoka; Attendance: 1,200; Referee: Emir Alečković (Sarajevo)

7 November 2012	GOŠK	1–2	Sloga	Gabela
13:30 CET	Jusufbašić 2'	Report	Kršić 45'; Đorić 51'	Stadium: Podavala; Attendance: 100; Referee: Danijel Bojo (Kiseljak)

7 November 2012	Široki Brijeg	1–1	Čelik	Široki Brijeg
16:30 CET	Wagner 11'	Report	Kajkut 83'	Stadium: Pecara; Attendance: 500; Referee: Elmir Pilav (Sarajevo)

==== Second leg ====
21 November 2012	Zrinjski	3–0 (5–3 agg.)	Zvijezda	Mostar
13:00 CET	Aničić 4', 27'; Muminović 80'	Report		Stadium: Bijeli Brijeg; Attendance: 1,000; Referee: Tomislav Čujić (Tomislavgrad)

21 November 2012	Sloga	1–1 (3–2 agg.)	GOŠK	Doboj
13:00 CET	Panić 41'	Report	69' (pen.) Jusufbašić	Stadium: Luke; Attendance: 400; Referee: Dragan Petrović (Banja Luka)

21 November 2012	Čelik	1–1 (2–2 agg.) (4–5 p)	Široki Brijeg	Zenica
16:30 CET	Barać 59'	Report	81' Ćorić	Stadium: Bilino Polje; Attendance: 2,000; Referee: Emir Alečković (Sarajevo)
	Penalties
	Barać (penalty scored); Čović (penalty scored); Jusić (penalty missed); Mešanović (penalty scored); Kajkut (penalty scored); Božičić (penalty missed)		(penalty scored) Wagner; (penalty scored) Ivanković; (penalty scored) Ješe; (penalty missed) Zlomislić; (penalty scored) Barišić; (penalty scored) Ćorić

21 November 2012	Željezničar	3–0 (4–0 agg.)	Olimpic	Sarajevo
17:00 CET	Jamak 47', 60'; Adilović 92'	Report		Stadium: Grbavica; Attendance: 1,500; Referee: Eldis Prošić (Cazin)

=== Semifinals ===
The four winners from the previous round played their opponents in this last hurdle before the final. The semifinals consisted of two two-legged fixtures. The first leg took part on 13 March, while the second leg was played on 3 April 2013.

Team 1	Agg.	Team 2	1st leg	2nd leg
Željezničar (I)	2–0	Zrinjski (I)	0–0	2–0
Sloga (II)	2–8	Široki Brijeg (I)	2–4	0–4

^{1} Roman numerals in brackets denote the league tier the clubs participate in during the 2012–13 season.
Source: NFSBiH

- two legs
- away goals rule applied if score is level after 180 minutes
- penalties used if needed, no extra-time

==== First leg ====
13 March 2013	Sloga	2–4	Široki Brijeg	Doboj
15:00 CET	Đorić 20'; Dujković 80' (pen.)	Report	Wagner 43', 52'; Roskam 60'; Kordić 67'	Stadium: Luke; Attendance: 1,500; Referee: Emir Alečković (Sarajevo)

13 March 2013	Željezničar	0–0	Zrinjski	Sarajevo
18:00 CET		Report		Stadium: Grbavica; Attendance: 2,500; Referee: Ognjen Valjić (Banja Luka)

==== Second leg ====
3 April 2013	Široki Brijeg	4–0 (8–2 agg.)	Sloga	Široki Brijeg
16:30 CEST	Kordić 16'; Barišić 39'; Džidić 66'; Marić 74'	Report		Stadium: Pecara; Attendance: 200; Referee: Elvis Mujić (Banovići)

3 April 2013	Zrinjski	0–2 (0–2 agg.)	Željezničar	Mostar
17:00 CEST		Report	Adilović 45'; Stanić 57'	Stadium: Bijeli Brijeg; Attendance: 3,000; Referee: Vladimir Bjelica (I. Sarajevo)

=== Final ===
The final will be contested between Željezničar and Široki Brijeg on 30 April and 14 May 2013.

Team 1	Agg.	Team 2	1st leg	2nd leg
Željezničar	2−2 (4–5 pen.)	Široki Brijeg	1–1	1−1

Source: NFSBiH

- two legs
- away goals rule applied if score is level after 180 minutes
- penalties used if needed, no extra-time

==== First leg ====
30 April 2013	Željezničar	1–1	Široki Brijeg	Sarajevo
18:00 CEST	Čolić 18'	Report	Kordić 5'	Stadium: Grbavica; Attendance: 4,300; Referee: Tomislav Čuić (Tomislavgrad)

==== Second leg ====
14 May 2013	Široki Brijeg	1–1 (2–2 agg.) (5–4 p)	Željezničar	Široki Brijeg
19:00 CEST	Wagner 63'	Report	Pehilj 90'	Stadium: Pecara; Attendance: 3,500; Referee: Edin Jakupović (Bihać)
	Penalties
	Šilić (penalty scored); Kordić (penalty scored); Wagner (penalty scored); Ješe (penalty missed); Zlomislić (penalty missed); I. Džidić (penalty scored); Landeka (penalty scored)		(penalty missed) Pehilj; (penalty missed) Adilović; (penalty scored) Čolić; (penalty scored) Stanić; (penalty scored) Hasanović; (penalty scored) Smajić; (penalty missed) Svraka

== Top goalscorers ==
Rank	Player	Club	Goals
1	(Brazil) Wagner Santos Lago	Široki Brijeg	6
1	(Serbia) Igor Aničić	Zrinjski	6
3	(Bosnia and Herzegovina) Borislav Lukić	Sloga	5
3	(Bosnia and Herzegovina) Eldin Adilović	Željezničar	5
5	(Bosnia and Herzegovina) Sabahudin Jusufbašić	GOŠK	4
5	(Bosnia and Herzegovina) Armin Kapetan	Radnik	4
5	(Bosnia and Herzegovina) Krešimir Kordić	Široki Brijeg	4
5	(Bosnia and Herzegovina) Ermin Vehabović	Zvijezda	4
9	4 players	3	
10	13 players	2	
11	35 players	1	
–	2 players	OG	

- Players/clubs in italic are out of the competition.

== Media coverage ==
Only from quarter-finals and onward selected matches will be broadcast in Bosnia and Herzegovina by BHT1.

These matches will be or were broadcast live on television:

Round	BHT1
Quarter-finals	Široki Brijeg – Čelik (First leg); Čelik – Široki Brijeg (Second leg)
Semi-finals	Željezničar – Zrinjski (First leg); Zrinjski – Željezničar (Second leg)
Final	Željezničar – Široki Brijeg (First leg); Široki Brijeg – Željezničar (Second leg)

== See also ==
- 2012–13 Premier League of Bosnia and Herzegovina
- Football Federation of Bosnia and Herzegovina
