= 2013–14 First League of the Republika Srpska =

First League of the Republika Srpska
- Season: 2013–14
- Champions: Drina Zvornik; 2nd First League title
- Promoted: Drina Zvornik
- Relegated: Sloga Doboj; Modriča Maxima; Borac Šamac; Rudar Ugljevik
- Matches: 182
- Goals: 468 (2.57 per match)
- Top goalscorer: Vladimir Karalić (15 goals)

The 2013–14 First League of the Republika Srpska was the eighteenth season of the First League of the Republika Srpska, the second tier football league of Bosnia and Herzegovina, since its original establishment and the eleventh as a second-tier league. It began on 17 August 2013 and ended on 4 June 2014; a winter break where no matches are played was in effect between 10 November 2013 and 16 March 2014. Mladost (VO) were the last champions, having won their one championship title in the 2012–13 season and earning a promotion to Premier League of Bosnia and Herzegovina.

Fourteen clubs were participated in this session, ten returning from the previous session, one relegated from Premier League of Bosnia and Herzegovina, two promoted from two regional Second League of the Republika Srpska.

== Changes from last season ==
=== Team changes ===
==== From First League of the RS ====
Promoted to Premier League

- Mladost (VO)

Relegated to one of 2 respective regional Second League of the RS

- Ljubić (Second League of the RS – West)

==== To First League of RS ====
Relegated from Premier League

- ---

Promoted from two regional Second League of the RS

- Napredak (DŠ) (Second League of the RS – East)

=== Stadions and locations ===
Location of clubs in 2012–13 Prva liga Republike Srpske

Team	Location	Stadium	Capacity
Borac	Šamac	Gradski Stadion, Šamac	3,000
Drina HE	Višegrad	Gradski Stadion, Višegrad	1,500
Drina (Z)	Zvornik	Gradski Stadion, Zvornik	3,000
Kozara	Gradiška	Gradski Stadion, Gradiška	5,000
Mladost (G)	Gacko	Gradski Stadion, Gacko	3,500
Modriča	Modriča	Dr. Milan Jelić Stadium	7,600
Napredak (DŠ)	Donji Šepak	Gradski stadion Donji Šepak	1,000
Podrinje	Janja	Podrinje Stadium	3,000
Proleter	Teslić	Radolinka Stadium	5,000
Rudar (U)	Ugljevik	Novi Gradski Stadion, Ugljevik	8,000
Sloboda (MG)	Mrkonjić Grad	Gradski Stadion Luke, Mrkonjić Grad	2,000
Sloboda (NG)	Bosanski Novi	Mlakve Stadium	4,000
Sloga	Doboj	Luke Stadium, Doboj	2,000
Sutjeska	Foča	Gradski Stadion, Foča	4,000

== League table ==
Pos	Team	Pld	W	D	L	GF	GA	GD	Pts	Promotion or relegation
1	Drina Zvornik (C, P)	26	15	8	3	38	16	+22	53	Promotion to Premijer Liga BIH
2	Podrinje	26	13	5	8	51	32	+19	44	
3	Sloboda Mrkonjić Grad	26	13	5	8	49	32	+17	44	
4	Kozara	26	11	9	6	32	26	+6	42	
5	Drina Višegrad	26	12	4	10	42	34	+8	40	
6	Napredak Donji Šepak	26	11	6	9	34	27	+7	39	
7	Sloboda Novi Grad	26	11	5	10	40	32	+8	38	
8	Sutjeska Foča	26	9	9	8	24	30	−6	36	
9	Proleter Teslić	26	10	5	11	42	41	+1	35	
10	Mladost Gacko	26	9	8	9	26	30	−4	35	
11	Sloga Doboj (R)	26	10	5	11	27	30	−3	35	Relegation to Second League RS
12	Modriča (R)	26	9	5	12	25	31	−6	32	Relegation to Second League RS
13	Borac Šamac (R)	26	5	5	16	25	42	−17	20	Relegation to Second League RS
14	Rudar Ugljevik (R)	26	3	3	20	12	64	−52	12	Relegation to Second League RS

Source: SportDC
Rules for classification: 1st points; 2nd goal difference; 3rd goals scored
For deciding champions, qualification to higher rank and relegation: 1st points; 2nd head-to-head points; 3rd head-to-head goal difference; 4th head-to-head goals scored; 5th head-to-head away goals scored; 6th goal difference; 7th goals scored
(C) Champions; (P) Promoted; (R) Relegated
