= 2012–13 Republika Srpska Cup =

2012–13 Republika Srpska Football Cup
Tournament details
- Country: Bosnia and Herzegovina
- Teams: 30

Final positions
- Champions: Radnik Bijeljina
- Runners-up: Borac Banja Luka

The Republika Srpska 2012–13 was tenth season of the Republika Srpska national football tournament.

The competition started on 19 September 2012, and got concluded on 2 June 2013. FK Borac Banja Luka were the defending champions, while FK Radnik Bijeljina were the new champions after defeating Borac in the final.

== Calendar ==
Round	Date(s)	Number of fixtures	Clubs	New entries this round
Round of 32	12 September 2012	16	32 → 16	none
Round of 16	10 October 2012	8	16 → 8	none
Quarterfinals	7 November 2012	4	8 → 4	none
Semifinals	17 April and 15 May 2013	2	4 → 2	none
Final	30 May and 2 June 2013	1	2 → 1	none

== Draw ==
The draws for the round of 32 was conducted in Banja Luka at 12:00 (CEST) on 6 September 2012. All 31 clubs were in the same pot, resulting that every club could get any other club as his opponent. The first-drawn team served as hosts.

== Competition ==
=== Round of 32 ===
This round consisted of 16 single-legged fixtures. All 31 clubs entered the competition from this round, while the matches were played on 12 September 2012. In case of a draw in the regular time, the winner would have been determined with a penalty shootout.

=== West ===
Tie no	Home team	Score	Away team
1	Kozara (DO) (V)	2–2 (4–2 pen.)	Modriča (II)
2	Vučijak (III)	0–2	Rudar Prijedor (I)
3	Laktaši (III)	2–4	Borac (BL) (I)
4	Gomionica (III)		Ljubić (II)
5	Jedinstvo (Ž) (III)	2–1	Sloboda (NG) (II)
6	Sloga Doboj (II)	0–1	Sloboda (MG) (II)
7	Mladost (KV) (III)	2–0	Borac (KD) (IV)
8	Borac (Š) (II)	1–2	Kozara (II)

- Free team Proleter

=== East ===
Tie no	Home team	Score	Away team
9	Drina (Z) (II)	2–1	Leotar (I)
10	Vlasenica (III)	0–0 (5–3 pen.)	Slavija (I)
11	Drina HE (II)	1–0	Podrinje (II)
12	Mladost (BS) (III)	3–5	Rudar (U) (II)
13	Glasinac 2011 (III)	0–1	Sutjeska (II)
14	Velež (N) (IV)	2–0	Mladost (G) (II)

- Free team Radnik (B)

=== Round of 16 ===
This round consisted of 8 single-legged fixtures. The date for the matches were determined with the draw which was held on October 4 . The matches took place on October 10. In a case of a draw in the regular time, the winner would have been determined with a penalty shootout.

Tie no	Home team	Score	Away team
1	Drina HE (II)	0–1	Radnik (I)
2	Proleter (III)	2–1	Ljubić (II)
3	Vlasenica (III)	0–1	Rudar (P) (I)
4	Velež (N) (IV)	0–3	Jedinstvo (Ž) (III)
5	Mladost (KV) (III)	1–3	Drina (Z) (II)
8	Rudar (U) (II)	2–0	Kozara (II)
7	Kozara (DO) (V)	0–2	Borac (BL) (I)
8	Sutjeska (II)	2–2 (5–4 pen.)	Sloboda (MG) (II)

=== Quarterfinals ===
This round consisted of 4 single-legged fixtures. The date for the matches were determined with the draw which was held on October 25. The matches took place on November 7. In a case of a draw in the regular time, the winner would have been determined with a penalty shootout.

Tie no	Home team	Score	Away team
1	Jedinstvo (Ž) (III)	1–2	Borac (BL) (I)
2	Proleter (III)	2–0	Sutjeska (II)
3	Drina (Z) (II)	0–0 (5–4 pen.)	Rudar (P) (I)
4	Rudar (U) (II)	0–2	Radnik (I)

=== Semifinals ===
The four winners from the previous round played their opponents in this last hurdle before the final. The semifinals consisted of two two-legged fixtures. The first leg took part on 17 April, while the second leg was played on 15 May 2013.

Team 1	Agg.	Team 2	1st leg	2nd leg
Borac (BL) (I)	4–1	Drina (Z) (II)	3–1	1–0
Radnik (I)	5–1	Proleter (III)	2–0	3–1

- two legs
- away goals rule applied if score is level after 180 minutes
- penalties used if needed, no extra-time

=== Final ===
The final was contested between Borac Banja Luka and Radnik on 30 May and 2 June 2013.

Team 1	Agg.	Team 2	1st leg	2nd leg
Radnik (I)	1−1 (4–2 pen.)	Borac (BL) (I)	0–1	1−0

Source: FS RS

- two legs
- away goals rule applied if score is level after 180 minutes
- penalties used if needed, no extra-time
