= 2011–12 First League of the Republika Srpska =

First League of the Republika Srpska
- Season: 2011–12
- Champions: Radnik; 3rd First League title
- Promoted: Radnik
- Relegated: Laktaši; Proleter
- Matches: 182
- Goals: 446 (2.45 per match)
- Top goalscorer: Borislav Lukić (17 goals)
- Biggest home win: Crvena Zemlja 5–0 Mladost; Sloboda (MG) 7–2 Laktaši; Podrinje 7–2 Laktaši
- Biggest away win: Proleter 1–4 Drina (Z); Proleter 1–4 Mladost; Proleter 1–4 Radnik; Mladost 0–3 Sloboda (NG)
- Highest scoring: Sloboda (MG) 7–2 Laktaši; Podrinje 7–2 Laktaši (9 goals)
- Longest winning run: 4 matches Sloboda (MG); Radnik
- Longest unbeaten run: 10 matches Mladost; Radnik
- Longest winless run: 10 matches Proleter
- Longest losing run: 4 matches Proleter

The 2011–12 First League of the Republika Srpska is the seventeenth season of the First League of the Republika Srpska, the second tier football league of Bosnia and Herzegovina, since its original establishment and the tenth as a second-tier league. It began on 13 August 2011 and ended on 26 May 2012; a winter break where no matches will be played was in effect between 5 November 2011 and 10 March 2012. Kozara were the last champions, having won their first championship title in the 2010–11 season and earning a promotion to Premier League of Bosnia and Herzegovina. This year Radnik won the championship, the third time they won the First League of the Republika Srpska.

14 clubs participated in this session, eleven returning from the previous session, one relegated from Premier League of Bosnia and Herzegovina and two promoted from two regional Second League of the Republika Srpska.

== Changes from last season ==
=== Team changes ===
==== From First League of the RS ====
Promoted to Premier League

- Kozara

Relegated to one of 2 respective regional Second League of the RS

- Famos (Second League of the RS - East)
- BSK (Second League of the RS - West)

==== To First League of RS ====
Relegated from Premier League

- Drina (Z)

Promoted from two regional Second League of the RS

- Crvena Zemlja (Second League of the RS - West)
- Rudar (U) (Second League of the RS - East)

=== Stadia and locations ===
Location of clubs in 2011–12 Premijer Liga

Team	Location	Stadium	Capacity
Crvena Zemlja	Nova Ves	Ciglana Stadium	1,000
Drina HE	Višegrad	Gradski Stadion, Višegrad	1,500
Drina (Z)	Zvornik	Gradski Stadion, Zvornik	3,000
Laktaši	Laktaši	Gradski Stadion, Laktaši	2,200
Mladost	Gacko	Gradski Stadion, Gacko	3,500
Modriča	Modriča	Dr. Milan Jelić Stadium	7,600
Podrinje	Janja	Podrinje Stadium	3,000
Proleter	Teslić	Radolinka Stadium	5,000
Radnik	Bijeljina	Gradski Stadion, Bijeljina	6,000
Rudar (U)	Ugljevik	Novi Gradski Stadion, Ugljevik	8,000
Sloboda (MG)	Mrkonjić Grad	Gradski Stadion Luke	2,000
Sloboda (NG)	Bosanski Novi	Mlakve Stadium	4,000
Sloga	Doboj	Luke Stadium, Doboj	2,000
Sutjeska	Foča	Gradski Stadion, Foča	4,000

=== Personnel and kits ===
Note: Flags indicate national team as has been defined under FIFA eligibility rules. Players may hold more than one non-FIFA nationality.

Team	Manager	Captain	Kit manufacturer	Shirt Sponsor
Crvena Zemlja	(Bosnia and Herzegovina) Marko Stojić		NAAI	Nektar/Arhing
Drina HE	(Bosnia and Herzegovina) Marko Vidaković		Kappa	–
Drina (Z)	(Bosnia and Herzegovina) Dragan Mićić	(Bosnia and Herzegovina) Goran Maksimović	NAAI	–
Laktaši	(Bosnia and Herzegovina) Predrag Tatić			Dukat
Mladost	(Bosnia and Herzegovina) Željko Popović		NAAI	
Modriča	(Bosnia and Herzegovina) Drago Svitlica	(Bosnia and Herzegovina) Đorđe Savić	Nike	Modriča Oil Refinery
Podrinje	(Bosnia and Herzegovina) Milorad Savić	(Bosnia and Herzegovina) Muhamed Jusufović	Legea	
Proleter	(Bosnia and Herzegovina) Zoran Dujaković		Legea	–
Radnik	(Bosnia and Herzegovina) Darko Nestorović	(Bosnia and Herzegovina) Nenad Kutlačić	Mass	–
Rudar (U)	(Bosnia and Herzegovina) Predrag Marić		NAAI	
Sloboda (MG)	(Bosnia and Herzegovina) Zoran Dragišić	(Bosnia and Herzegovina) Siniša Radoja	Bull	
Sloboda (NG)	(Bosnia and Herzegovina) Predrag Medić	(Bosnia and Herzegovina) Zoran Lukač	Nike	–
Sloga	(Bosnia and Herzegovina) Zoran Ćurguz		Joma	Autosalon M&M
Sutjeska	(Bosnia and Herzegovina) Filip Ikonić		Asics	

=== Managerial changes ===
Team	Outgoing manager	Manner of departure	Date of vacancy	Position in table	Replaced by	Date of appointment

=== New relegation rules ===
Unlike the last season, this season the Football Federation of the Republika Srpska decided to add relegation play-offs. Along the two last placed clubs in the league table which get relegated, the twelfth ranked team has to play relegation play-offs against the winner of the Second League of the Republika Srpska promotion play-offs which is contested between the two runners-up of the two Second Leagues of the Republika Srpska.

== League table ==
Pos	Team	Pld	W	D	L	GF	GA	GD	Pts	Promotion or relegation
1	Radnik (C, P)	26	14	8	4	31	19	+12	50	Promotion to Premijer Liga BIH
2	Sloga Doboj	26	14	7	5	48	31	+17	49	
3	Sloboda Mrkonjić Grad	26	14	4	8	40	21	+19	46	
4	Sutjeska Foča	26	11	5	10	34	36	−2	38	
5	Crvena Zemlja	26	11	4	11	40	35	+5	37	
6	Modriča	26	10	6	10	31	22	+9	36	
7	Drina Višegrad	26	10	6	10	22	25	−3	36	
8	Podrinje	26	9	7	10	32	29	+3	34	
9	Drina Zvornik	26	9	6	11	24	23	+1	33	
10	Mladost Gacko	26	9	6	11	25	33	−8	33	
11	Rudar Ugljevik	26	8	8	10	27	30	−3	32	
12	Sloboda Novi Grad	26	8	8	10	24	32	−8	32	Qualification to relegation play-off
13	Laktaši (R)	26	8	4	14	34	55	−21	28	Relegation to Second League RS
14	Proleter Teslić (R)	26	5	5	16	34	55	−21	20	Relegation to Second League RS

Source: FSRS (in Bosnian)
Rules for classification: 1st points; 2nd goal difference; 3rd goals scored
For deciding champions, qualification to higher rank and relegation: 1st points; 2nd head-to-head points; 3rd head-to-head goal difference; 4th head-to-head goals scored; 5th head-to-head away goals scored; 6th goal difference; 7th goals scored
(C) Champions; (P) Promoted; (R) Relegated

=== Relegation play-offs ===
Sloboda (NG) as 12th-placed team faced the winner of the promotion play-offs contested between the two runners-up of the two Second Leagues of the Republika Srpska, runner-up of the Second League of the RS - West side Jedinstvo in a two-legged play-off. Sloboda (NG) won 5–0 on aggregate and thus were not relegated from the First League of the Republika Srpska. Jedinstvo also remained in their respective league.

9 June 2012
17:30 CEST

Jedinstvo	0–2	Sloboda (NG)
	Report	Tica 68' (pen.); Antonić 71'

Stadion Jedinstva Žeravica, Gradiška
Attendance: 500
Referee: Goran Lakić, (Brčko)

13 June 2012
17:30 CEST

Sloboda (NG)	3–0	Jedinstvo
Jelisavac 22'; Kovačević 38'; Tica 53'	Report

Mlakve, Bosanski Novi

=== Positions by round ===
Promotion to 2012–13 PL BiH
Qualification to relegation play-offs
Relegation to 2012–13 Druga Liga RS

Team ╲ Round	1	2	3	4	5	6	7	8	9	10	11	12	13	14	15	16	17	18	19	20	21	22	23	24	25	26
Crvena Zemlja	6	3	5	1	3	8	4	6	5	2	4	6	9	6	8	6	4	5	4	4	4	4	4	4	4	5
Drina Višegrad	10	7	11	7	11	6	3	2	2	1	2	4	7	4	5	4	3	3	5	5	5	5	5	5	7	7
Drina Zvornik	8	11	14	9	6	9	11	8	8	9	10	9	6	8	6	7	8	11	8	9	9	9	9	10	11	9
Laktaši	2	1	3	6	1	7	10	11	9	10	11	12	11	9	12	9	10	10	11	11	12	13	13	13	13	13
Mladost Gacko	12	14	12	12	10	4	2	4	4	6	3	1	3	5	3	5	6	6	6	7	6	7	8	8	8	10
Modriča	11	10	7	3	7	3	7	10	10	7	8	5	8	10	7	10	11	8	7	6	7	8	7	6	6	6
Podrinje	13	9	4	8	2	5	8	9	11	12	12	10	12	12	11	12	9	9	10	10	10	11	12	9	8	8
Proleter Teslić	4	5	9	11	12	12	13	14	14	14	14	14	14	14	14	14	14	14	14	14	14	14	14	14	14	14
Radnik	1	6	6	10	8	10	9	5	3	5	1	3	2	3	2	3	2	2	2	2	1	1	1	1	1	1
Rudar Ugljevik	14	13	10	14	14	14	14	13	13	11	9	11	10	11	10	11	12	13	12	12	13	10	11	12	10	11
Sloboda Mrkonjić Grad	9	4	8	4	5	1	5	7	6	8	7	8	5	2	4	2	5	4	3	3	2	3	2	2	3	3
Sloboda Novi Grad	7	12	13	13	13	13	12	12	12	13	13	13	13	13	13	13	13	12	13	13	11	12	10	11	12	12
Sloga Doboj	5	8	2	5	9	11	6	3	7	3	5	2	1	1	1	1	1	1	1	1	3	2	3	3	2	2
Sutjeska Foča	3	2	1	2	4	2	1	1	1	4	6	7	4	7	9	8	7	7	9	8	8	6	6	7	5	4

Updated to match(es) played on 26 May 2012. Source: SportSport.ba

== Results ==
Home \ Away	CRZ	DRV	DRZ	LAK	MLA	MOD	POD	PRO	RAD	RUG	SMG	SNG	SLO	SUT
Crvena Zemlja		1–0	0–1	0–0	5–0	0–0	0–2	2–1	3–0	4–0	2–0	2–0	2–1	2–1
Drina Višegrad	2–1		0–0	1–0	0–0	1–0	1–1	3–2	1–1	1–0	1–0	2–0	1–3	2–0
Drina Zvornik	3–1	0–1		2–1	2–0	2–0	1–0	0–2	0–0	1–1	0–0	1–0	2–3	3–0
Laktaši	3–2	1–2	2–1		1–0	1–1	2–2	2–1	2–0	1–0	0–1	2–0	2–2	0–1
Mladost Gacko	2–0	1–0	0–0	1–3		1–0	2–0	3–1	1–0	0–0	2–1	0–3	2–0	1–2
Modriča	3–2	2–0	2–0	4–0	2–1		3–0	1–0	0–1	0–1	2–0	4–0	0–1	2–2
Podrinje	2–0	1–0	0–0	7–2	0–0	1–0		2–1	1–2	0–1	1–1	3–0	0–0	1–3
Proleter Teslić	1–2	1–0	1–4	4–2	1–4	1–1	2–2		1–4	2–3	1–3	0–1	0–3	3–0
Radnik	1–1	1–0	1–0	3–1	2–1	2–1	1–0	1–1		3–0	1–0	2–1	2–2	1–0
Rudar Ugljevik	2–3	1–1	2–0	4–0	3–0	1–1	2–2	1–1	1–1		0–0	1–0	0–2	2–1
Sloboda Mrkonjić Grad	2–0	2–0	2–1	7–2	3–1	0–0	1–0	5–1	1–0	1–0		2–0	4–1	4–0
Sloboda Novi Grad	1–1	0–0	1–0	3–2	0–0	0–1	3–1	2–2	0–0	2–1	1–0		2–1	2–2
Sloga Doboj	3–2	4–2	2–0	3–0	4–2	3–1	0–1	2–2	0–0	1–0	1–0	2–2		3–1
Sutjeska Foča	4–2	2–0	1–0	3–2	0–0	1–0	1–3	3–1	0–1	2–0	3–0	0–0	1–1	

Updated to match(es) played on 26 May 2012. Source: FSRS
Legend: Blue = home team win; Yellow = draw; Red = away team win.

=== Clubs season-progress ===
Team ╲ Round	1	2	3	4	5	6	7	8	9	10	11	12	13	14	15	16	17	18	19	20	21	22	23	24	25	26
Crvena Zemlja	D	W	D	W	L	L	W	L	W	W	D	L	L	W	L	W	W	D	W	L	W	L	W	L	L	L
Drina Višegrad	L	W	L	W	L	W	W	W	D	W	L	L	L	W	D	W	W	D	L	D	L	W	L	D	L	D
Drina Zvornik	D	L	L	W	W	D	L	W	D	D	L	W	W	L	W	L	L	L	W	D	L	W	L	D	L	W
Laktaši	W	W	L	L	W	L	L	L	W	L	D	L	W	W	L	W	L	D	L	L	D	L	D	L	W	L
Mladost Gacko	L	L	W	D	W	W	W	D	D	D	W	W	L	L	W	L	L	L	W	L	W	L	L	D	L	D
Modriča	L	D	W	W	L	W	L	L	D	W	D	W	L	L	W	L	L	W	W	W	L	L	D	W	D	D
Podrinje	L	W	W	L	W	D	L	D	L	L	D	W	L	W	D	L	W	D	L	W	L	L	D	W	W	D
Proleter Teslić	W	D	L	L	D	L	D	L	L	L	L	W	D	L	L	W	W	L	L	L	D	W	D	L	L	L
Radnik	W	L	D	L	W	D	D	W	W	D	W	L	W	D	W	L	W	W	D	W	W	W	W	D	W	D
Rudar Ugljevik	L	L	W	L	D	L	L	W	D	W	W	L	W	D	D	L	L	L	W	L	D	W	D	D	W	D
Sloboda Mrkonjić Grad	D	W	L	W	D	W	L	L	W	L	W	L	W	W	L	W	L	W	W	W	W	L	W	W	D	D
Sloboda Novi Grad	D	L	D	D	D	L	W	L	D	D	L	W	L	L	W	D	W	W	L	L	W	L	W	D	L	W
Sloga Doboj	W	L	W	D	L	D	W	W	L	W	D	W	D	W	D	W	L	W	D	W	D	W	L	W	W	W
Sutjeska Foča	W	W	D	D	L	W	W	W	L	L	D	L	W	L	L	D	W	L	L	W	L	W	W	L	W	D

Source: FSRS
W = Win; D = Draw; L = Lose

== Season statistics ==
=== Top goalscorers ===
Rank	Player	Club	Goals
1	(Bosnia and Herzegovina) Borislav Lukić	Sloga	17
2	(Bosnia and Herzegovina) Nikša Dimitrijević	Sloboda (MG)	12
3	(Bosnia and Herzegovina) Saša Stjepić	Sloboda (MG)	10
3	(Bosnia and Herzegovina) Aleksandar Kršić	Sloga	10
5	(Bosnia and Herzegovina) Nemanja Paripović	Laktaši	9
6	7 players	7	
7	4 players	6	
8	9 players	5	
9	14 players	4	
10	21 players	3	
11	38 players	2	
12	68 players	1	
–	1 players	O.G.	

== See also ==
- 2010–11 First League of the Republika Srpska
- 2011–12 Second League of the Republika Srpska
- 2011–12 First League of the Federation of Bosnia and Herzegovina
- 2011–12 Premier League of Bosnia and Herzegovina
- 2011–12 Kup Bosne i Hercegovine
- Football Federation of Bosnia and Herzegovina
