= Delimir Bajić =

Bosnia and Herzegovina footballer

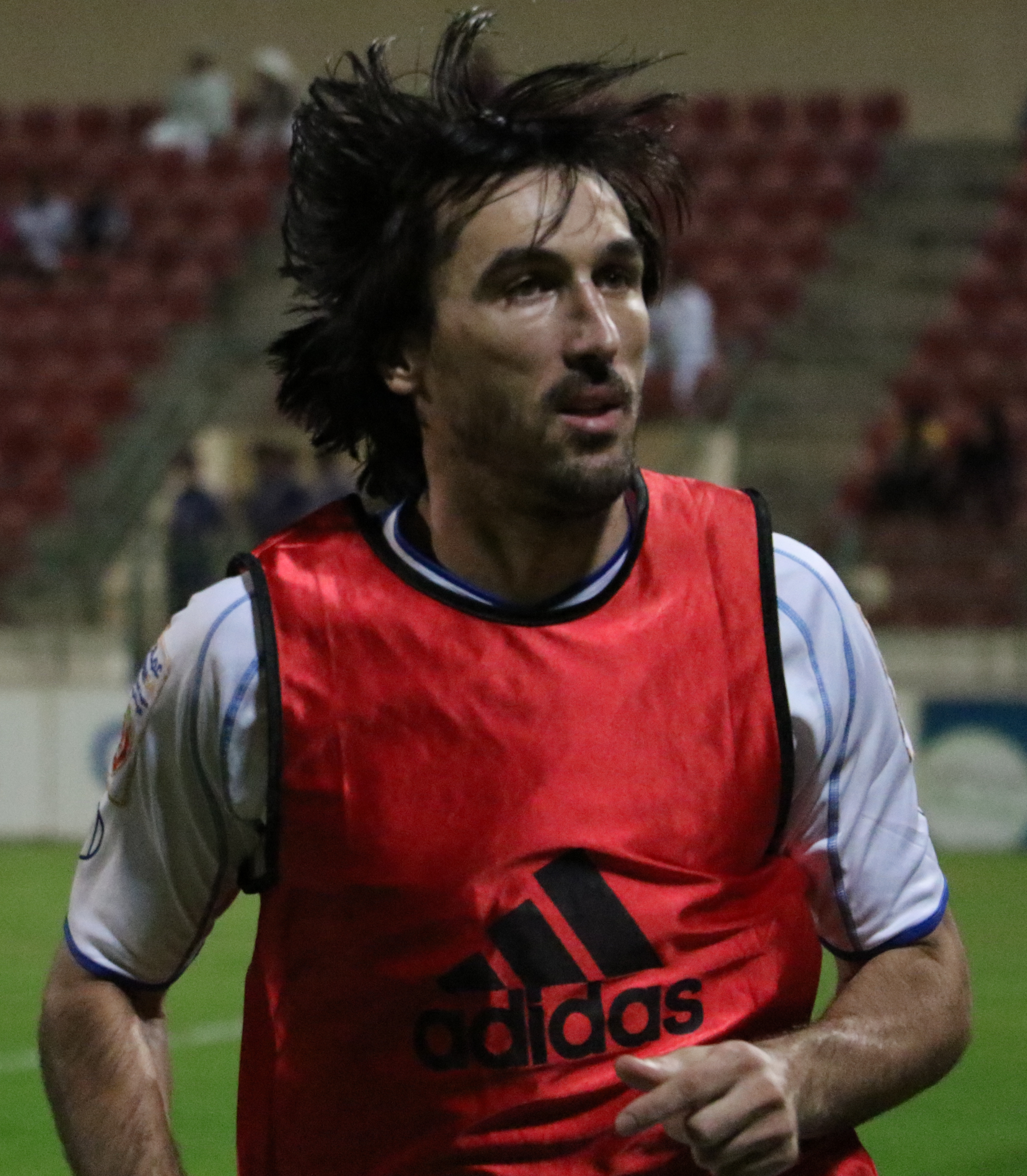
- Bajić warming up for Saham in 2015

Personal information
- Date of birth: 28 March 1983 (age 43)
- Place of birth: Bijeljina, SFR Yugoslavia
- Height: 1.90 m (6 ft 3 in)
- Position: Centre-back

Team information
- Current team: Borac Banja Luka
- Number: 5

Youth career
- 1994–1999: Mladost Velika Obarska

Senior career*
Years	Team	Apps	(Gls)
1999–2002	Mladost Velika Obarska		
2002–2007	Radnik Bijeljina		
2007–2008	Velež Mostar	23	(1)
2008–2010	Željezničar	27	(2)
2010–2011	Nassaji Mazandaran		(2)
2011–2012	Olympiakos Nicosia	28	(4)
2013	Sloboda Užice	20	(0)
2014	Mladost Velika Obarska	9	(1)
2014	Rad	9	(0)
2015	Saham	5	(0)
2015–2016	Mladost Velika Obarska	1	(0)
2016–2017	Radnik Bijeljina	11	(1)
2017–2018	Zvijezda 09	26	(3)
2018–	Borac Banja Luka	22	(2)
- * Club domestic league appearances and goals as of 5 June 2019

Delimir Bajić (Serbian Cyrillic: Делимир Бајић; born 28 March 1983) is a Bosnian-Herzegovinian footballer who plays for FK Borac Banja Luka in the Premier League of Bosnia and Herzegovina.

== Club career ==
=== Youth career ===
Born and raised in Bijeljina, SFR Yugoslavia, Delimir began his career as a football player when he was just 11 years old with Velika Obarska-based FK Mladost Velika Obarska.

=== Mladost Velika Obarska ===
Delimir continued playing with his parent team as he became a permanent member of the first team squad of the Velika Obarska-based club in 1999.

=== Radnik Bijeljina ===
After a long 8-year spell with the Bosnian club, in 2002 he moved back to his hometown Bijeljina where he signed a contract with FK Radnik Bijeljina. In his 5-year spell at the Bijeljina-based club, he also helped his team achieve the runners-up position in the 2006-07 Republika Srpska Cup.

=== Velež Mostar ===
In 2007, he signed a one-year contract with one of Bosnia and Herzegovina's top most club, Mostar-based FK Velež Mostar.

=== Željezničar Sarajevo ===
In 2008, he moved to the capital city of Bosnia and Herzegovina, Sarajevo where he signed a two-year contract with FK Željezničar Sarajevo. In his first season with the Sarajevo-based club, he made 12 appearances in the 2008–09 Premier League of Bosnia and Herzegovina. He made his first appearance in the 2009–10 Premier League of Bosnia and Herzegovina on 12 September 2009 in a 0–0 draw against NK Travnik and scored his first goal on 21 March 2010 in a 1–1 draw against HŠK Zrinjski Mostar. He scored 2 goals in 15 appearances in the 2009–10 season helping his club to win the 2009–10 Premier League of Bosnia and Herzegovina and the 2009–10 Bosnia and Herzegovina Football Cup.

=== Nassaji Mazandaran ===
He first moved out of Bosnia and Herzegovina in 2010 to Iran where he signed a one-year contract with Azadegan League club, Nassaji Mazandaran F.C. He scored his first goal for the club on 19 November 2010 in a 2–0 win over Shirin Faraz F.C. and scored another on 25 February 2011 in a 3–0 win over Iranjavan F.C.

=== Olympiakos Nicosia ===
In 2011, he moved back to Europe and more accurately to Cyprus where he signed a one-year contract with Cypriot First Division club, Olympiakos Nicosia. He made his Cypriot First Division debut on 10 September 2011 in a 1–1 draw against AEK Larnaca F.C. and scored his first goal on 11 December 2011 in a 3–1 win over Ermis Aradippou He scored 4 goals in 28 appearances for the Nicosia-based club in the 2011–12 Cypriot First Division and also made 3 appearances in the 2011–12 Cypriot Cup which included a 2–0 win over Omonia Aradippou in the second leg of the quarter-finals, a 0–1 loss against Ethnikos Achna FC in the first leg of the semi-finals and a 0–0 draw in the return leg of the semi-finals.

=== Sloboda Užice ===
In 2012, he moved to Serbia where he signed a one-year contract with Serbian SuperLiga club, FK Sloboda Užice. He made his Serbian SuperLiga debut on 27 February 2013 in a 2–2 draw against ŽFK Spartak Subotica. He made 15 appearances in the 2012–13 Serbian SuperLiga. He made his first appearance in the 2013–14 Serbian SuperLiga on 10 August 2013 in a 1–1 draw against the same club ŽFK Spartak Subotica. He made 5 appearances in the 2013–14 season.

=== Back to Mladost Velika Obarska ===
In 2014, he returned to Bosnia and Herzegovina and on 11 February 2014 he signed a six-month contract with his parent club, Mladost Velika Obarska. He made his first appearance of the 2013–14 Premier League of Bosnia and Herzegovina on 1 March 2014 in a 1–0 win over FK Borac Banja Luka and scored his first goal on 30 March 2014 in a 2–0 win over NK Zvijezda Gradačac. He scored 1 goal in 9 appearances in the 2013–14 season of Premier League of Bosnia and Herzegovina. He also made 2 appearances in the 2013–14 Bosnia and Herzegovina Football Cup which included a 0–1 loss against HŠK Zrinjski Mostar in the first leg of the quarter-finals and a 5–1 loss in the return leg of the quarter-finals.

=== Rad ===
In July 2014, he returned to Serbia and on 1 July 2014, he signed a six-month contract with another Serbian SuperLiga club, FK Rad. He made his debut for the club on 23 August 2014 in a 6–1 win over FK Voždovac. He made 9 appearances for the Belgrade-based club in the 2014–15 Serbian SuperLiga. He also made 2 appearances in the 2014–15 Serbian Cup, one in a 1–0 win over Red Star Belgrade in the Second Round and another in a 1–0 loss against FK Partizan in the quarter-finals.

=== Saham ===
On 16 January 2015, he signed a six-month contract with 2014 GCC Champions League runners-up Saham SC. He made 5 appearances in the 2014–15 Oman Professional League.

=== Later career ===
After Saham, he again played for Mladost Velika Obarska, again Radnik Bijeljina and FK Zvijezda 09.

Since July 2018, Bajić has been playing for FK Borac Banja Luka in the First League of the Republika Srpska. With Borac, he won the 2018–19 First League of RS title and got promoted back to the Premier League of Bosnia and Herzegovina.

== Personal life ==
His older brother, Branimir Bajić is a retired footballer who most of his career spent playing in Serbia and Germany.

== Career statistics ==
Club	Season	Division	League		Cup		Continental		Other		Total	
Club	Season	Division	Apps	Goals	Apps	Goals	Apps	Goals	Apps	Goals	Apps	Goals
Željezničar Sarajevo	2008–09	Premier League of Bosnia and Herzegovina	12	0	0	0	0	0	0	0	12	0
Željezničar Sarajevo	2009–10	Premier League of Bosnia and Herzegovina	15	2	0	0	0	0	0	0	15	2
Željezničar Sarajevo	Total		27	2	0	0	0	0	0	0	27	2
Olympiakos Nicosia	2011-12	Cypriot First Division	28	4	3	0	0	0	0	0	31	4
Olympiakos Nicosia	Total		28	4	3	0	0	0	0	0	31	4
Sloboda Užice	2012-13	Serbian SuperLiga	15	0	0	0	0	0	0	0	15	0
Sloboda Užice	2013–14	Serbian SuperLiga	5	0	0	0	0	0	0	0	5	0
Sloboda Užice	Total		20	0	0	0	0	0	0	0	20	0
Mladost Velika Obarska	2013–14	Premier League of Bosnia and Herzegovina	9	1	2	0	0	0	0	0	11	1
Mladost Velika Obarska	Total		9	1	2	0	0	0	0	0	11	1
Rad	2014–15	Serbian SuperLiga	9	0	2	0	0	0	0	0	11	0
Rad	Total		9	0	2	0	0	0	0	0	11	0
Saham	2014–15	Oman Professional League	5	0	0	0	0	0	0	0	5	0
Saham	Total		5	0	0	0	0	0	0	0	5	0
Career total			98	7	7	0	0	0	0	0	105	7

== Honours ==
Radnik Bijeljina

- Republika Srpska Cup runner-up: 2006–07

Željezničar Sarajevo

- Bosnian Premier League: 2009–10

Zvijezda 09

- First League of RS: 2017–18

Borac Banja Luka

- First League of RS: 2018–19
