= Zlatko Đorić =

Serbian footballer

Personal information
- Date of birth: 7 September 1976 (age 50)
- Place of birth: Gnjilane, SR Serbia, SFR Yugoslavia
- Height: 1.76 m (5 ft 9 in)
- Position: Forward

Team information
- Current team: Jedinstvo Banatsko Karađorđevo

Senior career*
Years	Team	Apps	(Gls)
1995–1999	Crvena Zvezda Gnjilane		
1999–2006	Budućnost Banatski Dvor	76	(32)
2006	Banat Zrenjanin	5	(0)
2007	Velež Mostar	7	(0)
2007–2008	Laktaši	31	(5)
2008–2009	Kozara Gradiška	24	(14)
2009	Modriča	12	(1)
2010	Zvijezda Gradačac	27	(1)
2011	Rudar Prijedor	24	(3)
2012	Radnik Bijeljina		
2012–2013	Sloga Doboj	10	(4)
2014	Borac Šamac	21	(5)
2015	Rudar Ugljevik	9	(3)
2015–2016	Borac Šamac		
2016–2017	13 Skojevki		
2017–	Jedinstvo Banatsko Karađorđevo		
- * Club domestic league appearances and goals as of 11 December 2019

Zlatko Đorić (Serbian Cyrillic: Златко Ђорић; born 7 September 1976) is a Serbian professional footballer who plays as a forward for Jedinstvo Banatsko Karađorđevo.

== Career ==
Nicknamed Isus (Jesus) because of his appearance, Đorić is best remembered for his time at Budućnost Banatski Dvor, helping the club earn promotion to the First League of Serbia and Montenegro for the first time in 2003. He was also a member of the team that reached the final of the 2003–04 Serbia and Montenegro Cup.

Between 2007 and 2017, Đorić played for numerous clubs in Bosnia and Herzegovina, including Velež Mostar (Spring 2007), Laktaši (2007–August 2008), Kozara Gradiška (2008–09), Modriča (Fall 2009), Zvijezda Gradačac (Spring–Fall 2010), Rudar Prijedor (Spring–Fall 2011), Radnik Bijeljina (Spring 2012), Sloga Doboj (2012–Fall 2013), Borac Šamac (Spring–Fall 2014 and 2015–16), Rudar Ugljevik (Spring 2015), and 13 Skojevki (2016–17).

In the summer of 2017, Đorić returned to Serbia and joined Vojvodina League East club Jedinstvo Banatsko Karađorđevo, a month shy of his 41st birthday.

== Statistics ==
Club	Season	League	
Club	Season	Apps	Goals
Banat Zrenjanin	2006–07	5	0
Velež Mostar	2006–07	7	0
Laktaši	2007–08	28	5
Laktaši	2008–09	3	0
Kozara Gradiška	2008–09	24	14
Modriča	2009–10	12	1
Zvijezda Gradačac	2009–10	15	1
Zvijezda Gradačac	2010–11	12	0
Rudar Prijedor	2010–11	11	2
Rudar Prijedor	2011–12	13	1
Radnik Bijeljina	2011–12		
Sloga Doboj	2012–13		
Sloga Doboj	2013–14	10	4
Borac Šamac	2013–14	10	0
Borac Šamac	2014–15	11	5
Rudar Ugljevik	2014–15	9	3
Borac Šamac	2015–16		
Career total		170	36

== Honours ==
Budućnost Banatski Dvor

- Serbia and Montenegro Cup: Runner-up 2003–04
