= Darjan Matović =

Bosnian football goalkeeper (born 1988)

Personal information
- Full name: Darjan Matović
- Date of birth: 12 October 1988 (age 38)
- Place of birth: Foča, SFR Yugoslavia
- Height: 1.90 m (6 ft 3 in)
- Position: Goalkeeper

Senior career*
Years	Team	Apps	(Gls)
2006–2011	Sutjeska Foča		
2011	Goražde		
2012–2013	Sutjeska Foča		
2013–2014	Javor Ivanjica	10	(0)
2014	→ Inđija (loan)	1	(0)
2015	Proleter Teslić	13	(0)
2015	Goražde		
2016	Sloboda Mrkonjić Grad		
2017-2018	Sloga Doboj		
2018-2024	Proleter Teslić		
- * Club domestic league appearances and goals as of 13 June 2015

Darjan Matović (Serbian Cyrillic: Дарјан Матовић; born 12 October 1988) is a Bosnian retired football goalkeeper.

In July 2013, Matović left Sutjeska Foča for Serbian Superliga side Javor Ivanjica. He later played for Sloboda Mrkonjić Grad in the 2016/17 season and finished his career at Proleter Teslić. He was named goalkeeper of the year of the 2012–13 First League of the Republika Srpska season.
