= 2017–18 First League of the Republika Srpska =

First League of the Republika Srpska
- Season: 2017–18
- Champions: Zvijezda 09; 1st First League title
- Promoted: Zvijezda 09
- Relegated: Sloga Doboj; Napredak (DŠ)
- Matches: 192
- Goals: 499 (2.6 per match)
- Top goalscorer: Demir Jakupović (16 goals)

The 2017–18 First League of the Republika Srpska was the twenty-third season of the First League of the Republika Srpska, the second tier football league of Bosnia and Herzegovina, since its original establishment and the sixteenth as a second-tier league.

== Clubs ==
Location of clubs in 2017–18 First League RS
- FK Drina Zvornik
- FK Kozara Gradiška
- FK Napredak Donji Šepak
- FK Podrinje Janja
- FK Rudar Prijedor
- FK Slavija Istočno Sarajevo
- FK Sloboda Mrkonjić Grad
- FK Sloga Doboj
- FK Sutjeska Foča
- FK Tekstilac Derventa
- FK Zvijezda 09 Etno Selo Stanišići
- FK Željezničar Banja Luka

== Regular season ==
| Pos | Team | Pld | W | D | L | GF | GA | GD | Pts | Qualification |
|---|---|---|---|---|---|---|---|---|---|---|
| 1 | Zvijezda 09 | 22 | 15 | 6 | 1 | 49 | 15 | +34 | 51 | Qualification for the Championship round |
| 2 | Rudar Prijedor | 22 | 14 | 7 | 1 | 42 | 12 | +30 | 49 | Qualification for the Championship round |
| 3 | Drina Zvornik | 22 | 10 | 8 | 4 | 28 | 18 | +10 | 38 | Qualification for the Championship round |
| 4 | Slavija | 22 | 9 | 9 | 4 | 34 | 24 | +10 | 36 | Qualification for the Championship round |
| 5 | Tekstilac Derventa | 22 | 9 | 7 | 6 | 29 | 23 | +6 | 34 | Qualification for the Championship round |
| 6 | Podrinje Janja | 22 | 8 | 3 | 11 | 24 | 28 | −4 | 27 | Qualification for the Championship round |
| 7 | Željezničar Banja Luka | 22 | 7 | 5 | 10 | 29 | 36 | −7 | 26 | Qualification for the Relegation round |
| 8 | Sloboda Mrkonjić Grad | 22 | 8 | 2 | 12 | 28 | 38 | −10 | 26 | Qualification for the Relegation round |
| 9 | Sutjeska Foča | 22 | 5 | 8 | 9 | 20 | 31 | −11 | 23 | Qualification for the Relegation round |
| 10 | Kozara | 22 | 3 | 9 | 10 | 16 | 36 | −20 | 18 | Qualification for the Relegation round |
| 11 | Sloga Doboj | 22 | 3 | 7 | 12 | 22 | 41 | −19 | 16 | Qualification for the Relegation round |
| 12 | Napredak Donji Šepak | 22 | 3 | 5 | 14 | 15 | 34 | −19 | 14 | Qualification for the Relegation round |

Source: Soccerway
Rules for classification: 1) Points; 2) Head-to-head points; 3) Head-to-head goal difference; 4) Head-to-head goals scored; 5) Head-to-head away goals scored (only if two teams); 6) Goal difference; 7) Goals scored; 8) Play-off.

== Promotion round ==
| Pos | Team | Pld | W | D | L | GF | GA | GD | Pts | Promotion |
|---|---|---|---|---|---|---|---|---|---|---|
| 1 | Zvijezda 09 (C, P) | 32 | 25 | 6 | 1 | 77 | 23 | +54 | 81 | Promotion to the Premijer Liga BiH |
| 2 | Rudar Prijedor | 32 | 21 | 8 | 3 | 61 | 17 | +44 | 71 | |
| 3 | Drina Zvornik | 32 | 11 | 13 | 8 | 38 | 29 | +9 | 46 | |
| 4 | Slavija | 32 | 11 | 12 | 9 | 42 | 43 | −1 | 45 | |
| 5 | Tekstilac Derventa | 32 | 10 | 9 | 13 | 35 | 42 | −7 | 39 | |
| 6 | Podrinje Janja | 32 | 10 | 6 | 16 | 38 | 51 | −13 | 36 | |

Source: Soccerway
Rules for classification: 1) Points; 2) Head-to-head points; 3) Head-to-head goal difference; 4) Head-to-head goals scored; 5) Head-to-head away goals scored (only if two teams); 6) Goal difference; 7) Goals scored; 8) Play-off.
(C) Champions; (P) Promoted

== Relegation round ==
| Pos | Team | Pld | W | D | L | GF | GA | GD | Pts | Relegation |
|---|---|---|---|---|---|---|---|---|---|---|
| 7 | Sloboda Mrkonjić Grad | 32 | 11 | 6 | 15 | 39 | 48 | −9 | 39 | |
| 8 | Kozara | 32 | 9 | 10 | 13 | 34 | 46 | −12 | 37 | |
| 9 | Sutjeska Foča | 32 | 9 | 10 | 13 | 31 | 42 | −11 | 37 | |
| 10 | Željezničar Banja Luka | 32 | 9 | 7 | 16 | 40 | 54 | −14 | 34 | |
| 11 | Sloga Doboj (R) | 32 | 7 | 10 | 15 | 38 | 58 | −20 | 31 | Relegation to the Second League RS |
| 12 | Napredak Donji Šepak (R) | 32 | 6 | 9 | 17 | 26 | 46 | −20 | 27 | Relegation to the Second League RS |

Source: Soccerway
Rules for classification: 1) Points; 2) Head-to-head points; 3) Head-to-head goal difference; 4) Head-to-head goals scored; 5) Head-to-head away goals scored (only if two teams); 6) Goal difference; 7) Goals scored; 8) Play-off.
(R) Relegated

== Season statistics ==
=== Top goalscorers ===
| Rank | Player | Club | Goals |
|---|---|---|---|
| 1 | (Bosnia and Herzegovina) Demir Jakupović | Rudar Prijedor | 16 |
| 2 | (Bosnia and Herzegovina) Damjan Krajišnik | Zvijezda 09 | 14 |
| 2 | (Bosnia and Herzegovina) Ognjen Jaćimović | Rudar Prijedor | 14 |
| 4 | (Bosnia and Herzegovina) Filip Vujić | Podrinje | 13 |
| 5 | (Bosnia and Herzegovina) Miljan Govedarica | Slavija / Zvijezda 09 | 12 |
| 5 | (Bosnia and Herzegovina) Ozren Perić | Tekstilac | 12 |
| 7 | (Bosnia and Herzegovina) Selmir Mahmutović | Zvijezda 09 | 11 |
| 7 | (Bosnia and Herzegovina) Borislav Lukić | Sloga Doboj | 11 |

== See also ==
- 2017–18 Bosnia and Herzegovina Football Cup
- 2017–18 First League of the Federation of Bosnia and Herzegovina
- 2017–18 Premier League of Bosnia and Herzegovina
