= 2016–17 First League of the Republika Srpska =

First League of the Republika Srpska
- Season: 2016–17
- Champions: Borac Banja Luka; 4th First League title
- Promoted: Borac Banja Luka
- Relegated: Borac Šamac
- Matches: 192
- Goals: 508 (2.65 per match)
- Top goalscorer: Selmir Mahmutović (21 goals)

The 2016–17 First League of the Republika Srpska was the twenty-second season of the First League of the Republika Srpska, the second tier football league of Bosnia and Herzegovina, since its original establishment and the fifteenth as a second-tier league.

== Clubs ==
Location of clubs in 2016–17 First League RS
- FK Borac Banja Luka
- FK Borac Šamac
- FK Drina Zvornik
- FK Kozara Gradiška
- FK Podrinje Janja
- FK Rudar Prijedor
- FK Slavija Istočno Sarajevo
- FK Sloboda Mrkonjić Grad
- FK Sloga Doboj
- FK Sutjeska Foča
- FK Tekstilac Derventa
- FK Zvijezda 09 Etno Selo Stanišići

== Regular season ==
Pos	Team	Pld	W	D	L	GF	GA	GD	Pts	Qualification
1	Borac Banja Luka	22	17	4	1	41	6	+35	55	Qualification for the Championship round
2	Rudar Prijedor	22	12	5	5	48	25	+23	41	Qualification for the Championship round
3	Podrinje Janja	22	12	4	6	34	18	+16	40	Qualification for the Championship round
4	Drina Zvornik	22	9	6	7	22	20	+2	33	Qualification for the Championship round
5	Tekstilac Derventa	22	8	8	6	17	14	+3	32	Qualification for the Championship round
6	Kozara	22	8	6	8	31	27	+4	30	Qualification for the Championship round
7	Zvijezda 09	22	9	2	11	23	34	−11	29	Qualification for the Relegation round
8	Sloga Doboj	22	6	8	8	34	37	−3	26	Qualification for the Relegation round
9	Sloboda Mrkonjić Grad	22	7	5	10	20	41	−21	26	Qualification for the Relegation round
10	Slavija	22	6	5	11	31	28	+3	23	Qualification for the Relegation round
11	Sutjeska Foča	22	6	3	13	17	35	−18	21	Qualification for the Relegation round
12	Borac Šamac	22	2	4	16	18	51	−33	10	Qualification for the Relegation round

Source: Soccerway
Rules for classification: 1) Points; 2) Head-to-head points; 3) Head-to-head goal difference; 4) Head-to-head goals scored; 5) Head-to-head away goals scored (only if two teams); 6) Goal difference; 7) Goals scored; 8) Play-off.

== Promotion round ==
Pos	Team	Pld	W	D	L	GF	GA	GD	Pts	Promotion
1	Borac Banja Luka (C, P)	32	25	6	1	61	12	+49	81	Promotion to the Premijer Liga BiH
2	Podrinje Janja	32	18	5	9	47	29	+18	59	
3	Rudar Prijedor	32	15	7	10	59	40	+19	52	
4	Drina Zvornik	32	15	7	10	39	29	+10	52	
5	Kozara	32	10	6	16	39	44	−5	36	
6	Tekstilac Derventa	32	8	12	12	18	26	−8	36	

Source: Soccerway
Rules for classification: 1) Points; 2) Head-to-head points; 3) Head-to-head goal difference; 4) Head-to-head goals scored; 5) Head-to-head away goals scored (only if two teams); 6) Goal difference; 7) Goals scored; 8) Play-off.
(C) Champions; (P) Promoted

== Relegation round ==
Pos	Team	Pld	W	D	L	GF	GA	GD	Pts	Relegation
7	Sloga Doboj	32	13	8	11	61	52	+9	47	
8	Sloboda Mrkonjić Grad	32	13	7	12	43	51	−8	46	
9	Slavija	32	12	6	14	51	41	+10	42	
10	Zvijezda 09	32	13	3	16	36	51	−15	42	
11	Sutjeska Foča	32	9	6	17	30	52	−22	33	
12	Borac Šamac (R)	32	2	5	25	24	81	−57	11	Relegation to the Second League RS

Source: Soccerway
Rules for classification: 1) Points; 2) Head-to-head points; 3) Head-to-head goal difference; 4) Head-to-head goals scored; 5) Head-to-head away goals scored (only if two teams); 6) Goal difference; 7) Goals scored; 8) Play-off.
(R) Relegated

== Season statistics ==
=== Top goalscorers ===
Rank	Player	Club	Goals
1	(Bosnia and Herzegovina) Selmir Mahmutović	Sloga Doboj	21
2	(Bosnia and Herzegovina) Draško Lolić	Rudar Prijedor	15
3	(Bosnia and Herzegovina) Ognjen Jaćimović	Rudar Prijedor	14
4	(Montenegro) Ivan Delić	Borac Banja Luka	12
5	(Bosnia and Herzegovina) Filip Vujić	Podrinje	11
6	(Bosnia and Herzegovina) Dejan Vučić	Podrinje	10

== See also ==
- 2016–17 Premier League of Bosnia and Herzegovina
- 2016–17 First League of the Federation of Bosnia and Herzegovina
- 2016–17 Bosnia and Herzegovina Football Cup
