= Milan Ozren =

Bosnian footballer

Personal information
- Full name: Milan Ozren
- Date of birth: 5 August 1977 (age 49)
- Place of birth: , SFR Yugoslavia
- Height: 1.85 m (6 ft 1 in)
- Position: Central defender

Senior career*
Years	Team	Apps	(Gls)
1999-2000	Borac Banja Luka		
2000-2001	Domžale	17	(0)
2002-2004	Rheindorf Altach		
2004-2005	Rudar Ugljevik	12	(0)
2005-2007	Borac Banja Luka		
2007-2008	Kozara Gradiška		
2008-2009	Borac Banja Luka	2	(1)

International career^{‡}
2001	Bosnia and Herzegovina	2	(0)
2001	Bosnia and Herzegovina XI	2	(0)

Managerial career
- 2018: Borac Banja Luka (assistant)
- * Club domestic league appearances and goals ‡ National team caps and goals as of 19 June 2021

Milan Ozren (born 5 August 1977) is a Bosnian retired football player. He worked as an assistant to manager Igor Janković at Borac Banja Luka in 2018.

== International career ==
Ozren made 4 appearances for Bosnia and Herzegovina (2 unofficial), all of them at the January 2001 Millenium Cup: the match against Bangladesh there marked his international debut and his final international was against Serbia and Montenegro. He was the first player from the autonomous Republika Srpska to wear the colors of the "united" national team of Bosnia and Herzegovina and was deemed a traitor by the Borac fans ons his return.
