= Ozren Perić =

Bosnian-Herzegovinian footballer (born 1987)

Personal information
- Full name: Ozren Perić
- Date of birth: 4 April 1987 (age 39)
- Place of birth: Bosanska Gradiška, SFR Yugoslavia
- Height: 1.85 m (6 ft 1 in)
- Position: Striker

Team information
- Current team: Borac Šamac

Youth career
- Kozara Gradiška
- 2005–2006: Sturm Graz II

Senior career*
Years	Team	Apps	(Gls)
2006–2007	Sturm Graz II	17	(4)
2006–2008	Sturm Graz	21	(0)
2008–2009	Rudar Velenje	24	(8)
2009	Sturm Graz	0	(0)
2009	Borac Banja Luka	4	(0)
2010	Kozara Gradiška	13	(6)
2010	Laktaši		
2011	Zrinjski Mostar	7	(0)
2011–2013	Slavia Orlová		
2013–2016	Kozara Gradiška	54	(12)
2016–2017	Krupa	20	(2)
2017–2019	Derventa	56	(18)
2019–2020	Alfa Modriča		
2020–	Borac Šamac		

International career
2007	Bosnia and Herzegovina U-21	1	(0)
- * Club domestic league appearances and goals as of 14:37, 20 July 2019 (UTC)

Ozren Perić (Serbian Cyrillic: Озрен Перић; born 4 April 1987) is a Bosnian-Herzegovinian footballer who plays for Borac Šamac.

== Club career ==
In July 2017, Perić joined FK Tekstilac Derventa. Two years later, he joined FK Alfa Modriča ahead of the 2019/20 season.
