= FK Crvena Zemlja =

Football club

FK Crvena Zemlja Nova Ves
- Full name: Fudbalski Klub Crvena Zemlja
- Founded: 1974 in Nova Ves
- Ground: Ciglana Nova Ves
Home colours

FK Crvena Zemlja (Cyrillic: ФК Црвена Земља) is a football club playing in the village of Nova Ves, Republika Srpska, Bosnia and Herzegovina.

They played one season in the second tier-First League of the Republika Srpska, in 2011–12.

== Club seasons ==
Season	League									Cup	Europe
Season	Division	P	W	D	L	F	A	Pts	Pos	Cup	Europe
2010–11	Second League of RS – West	26	19	4	3	55	20	61	1st ↑		
2011–12	First League of the Republika Srpska	26	11	4	11	40	35	37	5th		
2012–13	First League of the Republika Srpska	0	0	0	0	0	0	0	withdrew		
2014–15	Inter-municipal league RS – Gradiška – East	14	3	3	8	26	50	12	7th		
2015–16	Municipal league Laktaši-Srbac-Prnjavor	12	3	4	5	19	21	13	5th		
2016–17	Municipal league Laktaši-Srbac-Prnjavor	16	4	0	12	19	49	12	8th		
2017–18	Municipal league Laktaši-Srbac-Prnjavor	16	7	4	5	32	32	25	4th		
2018–2019	Municipal league Laktaši-Srbac-Prnjavor	14	4	1	9	25	42	13	6th		
2019–20	Municipal league Laktaši-Srbac-Prnjavor	9	2	0	7	22	38	6	8th		

== Notable managers ==
- (Bosnia and Herzegovina) Mitar Lukić (2010–2011)
- (Bosnia and Herzegovina) Marko Stojić (2011–2012)
