= Nemanja Supić =

Bosnian former professional footballer (born 1982)

Personal information
- Full name: Nemanja Supić
- Date of birth: 12 January 1982 (age 44)
- Place of birth: Gacko, SFR Yugoslavia
- Height: 1.97 m (6 ft 6 in)
- Position: Goalkeeper

Team information
- Current team: Red Star Belgrade (goalkeeping coach)

Youth career
- Mladost Gacko

Senior career*
Years	Team	Apps	(Gls)
2001–2004	Mladost Gacko	7	(0)
2004	Radnički Obrenovac	11	(0)
2005	Bežanija	16	(0)
2005–2006	Zemun	8	(0)
2007	Čukarički	1	(0)
2007–2008	Voždovac	30	(0)
2008–2009	Javor Ivanjica	30	(0)
2009	Anorthosis	0	(0)
2009–2010	Politehnica Timișoara	1	(0)
2011	Javor Ivanjica	11	(0)
2011–2013	Vojvodina	54	(0)
2013	Novi Pazar	11	(0)
2014–2015	Voždovac	38	(0)
2015–2019	Red Star Belgrade	5	(0)
Total		206	(0)

International career
2009	Bosnia and Herzegovina	8	(0)

Managerial career
- 2019–: Red Star Belgrade (goalkeeping coach)
- * Club domestic league appearances and goals

Nemanja Supić (Cyrillic: Немања Супић; born 12 January 1982) is a Bosnian retired professional footballer who played as a goalkeeper.

== Club career ==
Born in Gacko, Supić started out at his hometown club Mladost Gacko. He made seven appearances in the 2002–03 season, as the team suffered relegation from the top flight. In the 2004–05 season, Supić moved across the board and joined Serbia and Montenegro second-tier club Radnički Obrenovac.

In the summer of 2008, Supić signed with newly promoted Serbian SuperLiga side Javor Ivanjica. He enjoyed a breakthrough season in 2008–09, helping his team to a highest ever fourth-place finish. In June 2009, Supić was transferred to Cypriot club Anorthosis, but was released after less than two months. He subsequently moved to Romanian side Politehnica Timișoara.

In early 2011, Supić returned to Serbia and rejoined Javor Ivanjica until the end of the season. He later switched to Vojvodina, playing regularly over the next two seasons.

In August 2015, Supić was signed by Red Star Belgrade. He retired from professional football after the 2018–19 season.

== International career ==
Supić made his international debut for Bosnia and Herzegovina under manager Miroslav Blažević during the World Cup 2010 qualifiers, helping the team to a 4–2 away win over Belgium on 28 March 2009. He made seven more appearances that year, as Bosnia and Herzegovina placed second in UEFA's qualifying Group 5, only behind Spain. However, they were eliminated by Portugal in the play-offs. His final international was an October 2009 World Cup qualification match against Spain.

== Honours ==
Red Star Belgrade

- Serbian SuperLiga: 2015–16, 2017–18, 2018–19
