= Mitar Lukić =

Bosnian football manager (born 1957)

Personal information
- Date of birth: 22 October 1957 (age 69)
- Place of birth: Gračanica, SFR Yugoslavia
- Position: Midfielder

Youth career
- Bratstvo Gračanica

Senior career*
Years	Team	Apps	(Gls)
- Bratstvo Gračanica
- Drina Zvornik
1984–1988	Sloboda Tuzla	91	(22)
1988–1989	Trabzonspor	34	(6)
1989–1991	Sloboda Tuzla	59	(6)
1991–1992	Mačva Šabac		
Total		184	(34)

Managerial career
- 2003–2004: Modriča
- 2008: Modriča
- 2010–2011: Crvena Zemlja
- 2011: Modriča
- 2012–2014: Tekstilac Derventa
- 2015–2017: Sloga Doboj
- 2017–2019: Odžak 102
- 2019–2021: Borac Šamac
- 2021: Polet 1926
- 2022: Modriča
- * Club domestic league appearances and goals

Mitar Lukić (born 22 October 1957) is a Serbian professional football manager and former player.

== Playing career ==
Born in Gračanica, SR Bosnia and Herzegovina, SFR Yugoslavia, Lukić started his playing career at hometown club Bratstvo Gračanica. He also had a spell with Drina Zvornik before joining Sloboda Tuzla in 1984. He played for Sloboda until 1991, with the exception of the season 1988–89 which he spent abroad playing in the Turkish Süper Lig for Trabzonspor. He finished his playing career in Serbia playing for Mačva Šabac.

== Managerial career ==
After retiring, Lukić began his managerial career in Bosnia and Herzegovina with Modriča, winning the 2003–04 Bosnian Cup. He returned to Modriča in 2008, but later became manager of Crvena Zemlja. Lukić then again returned to Modriča, after which he worked at Tekstilac Derventa and most recently Sloga Doboj. In August 2019, he was appointed manager of Second League of RS (Group West) club Borac Šamac.

== Personal life ==
Lukić's son, Jovo, is also a professional footballer who plays for Universitatea Cluj in Romania.

== Honours ==
=== Manager ===
Modriča

- Bosnian Cup: 2003–04
