= Jovica Vico =

Bosnian footballer (born 1978)

Personal information
- Full name: Jovica Vico
- Date of birth: 27 February 1978 (age 48)
- Place of birth: SFR Yugoslavia
- Height: 1.90 m (6 ft 3 in)
- Position: Forward

Team information
- Current team: FK Leotar; Sports director

Senior career*
Years	Team	Apps	(Gls)
- Čelik Zenica
- Toluca
- Atlético Mexiquense
1998–1999	Čelik Nikšić		
1999–2001	Maribor	4	(0)
2001	ERA Šmartno	20	(12)
2002–2004	Rapid Wien	22	(5)
2007–2010	Leotar	62	(21)
2010–2011	Mladost Gacko	10	(3)
- * Club domestic league appearances and goals as of 18 January 2011

Jovica Vico (Serbian Cyrillic: Јовица Вицо, born 27 February 1978) is former Bosnian professional footballer.

== Club career ==
He has played for Bosnian club NK Čelik Zenica, Mexican clubs CD Toluca and Atlético Mexiquense, Montenegrin FK Čelik Nikšić, Slovenian clubs NK Maribor and NK Šmartno, Austrian SK Rapid Wien and FK Leotar in the Premier League of Bosnia and Herzegovina.

In February 2008 he was part of the Bosnia and Herzegovina A2 team.

By June 2015 he was sports director of FK Leotar.

== External sources ==
- Stats from 2010-11 at BiHsoccer
