= FK Mladost Velika Obarska =

- Full name: Fudbalski klub Mladost Velika Obarska
- Founded: 1948
- Ground: Gradski Stadion, Velika Obarska
- Capacity: 1,000
- Chairman: Borko Blagojević
- Manager: Slavoljub Bubanja
- League: First Municipal League Bijeljina - East (Bosnian sixth level)
- 2018–19: Second Municipal League Bijeljina - East, 1st (promoted)
Home colours	Away colours

Fudbalski klub Mladost Velika Obarska (Serbian Cyrillic: Фудбалски клуб Младост Велика Обарска) is a football club from the village of Velika Obarska, in Republika Srpska, Bosnia and Herzegovina.

== History ==
The club was formed 1948 and competed mostly in lower leagues within Yugoslav league system. Since the break-up of Yugoslavia it played in the leagues of Republika Srpska. In the season 2012–13, Mladost finished top of the First League of the Republika Srpska 7 points in front of Sloboda Mrkonjić Grad and Kozara Gradiška, and were promoted to the 2013–14 Premier League of Bosnia and Herzegovina. Three years later, due to difficult financial reasons, Mladost had to descend in the summer 2017 from the fourth tier Regional League of Republika Srpska - East in the seventh and last Bosnian league Second Municipal League Bijeljina - East.

== Stadium ==
Mladost VO plays at Stadion Velika Obarska with a capacity of 1,000 spectators.

== Honours ==
- First League of the Republika Srpska: 1

2012–13

== Coaching staff ==
Manager	(Montenegro) Slavoljub Bubanja
Assistant manager	(Bosnia and Herzegovina) Miodrag Rankić
Assistant manager	(Bosnia and Herzegovina) Predrag Nikolić
Secretary	(Bosnia and Herzegovina) Stanko Marjanović
Director	(Bosnia and Herzegovina) Slađan Gubić

== Managers ==
- (Bosnia and Herzegovina) Đojo Milovanović
- (Serbia) Miroslav Milanović (????–Oct 3, 2013)
- (Montenegro) Dušan Jevrić (Oct 3, 2013 – Jan 19,2015)
- (Montenegro) Slavoljub Bubanja (Jan 19, 2015–)
