= Stanišići =

Coordinates: 44°47′04″N 19°16′45″E

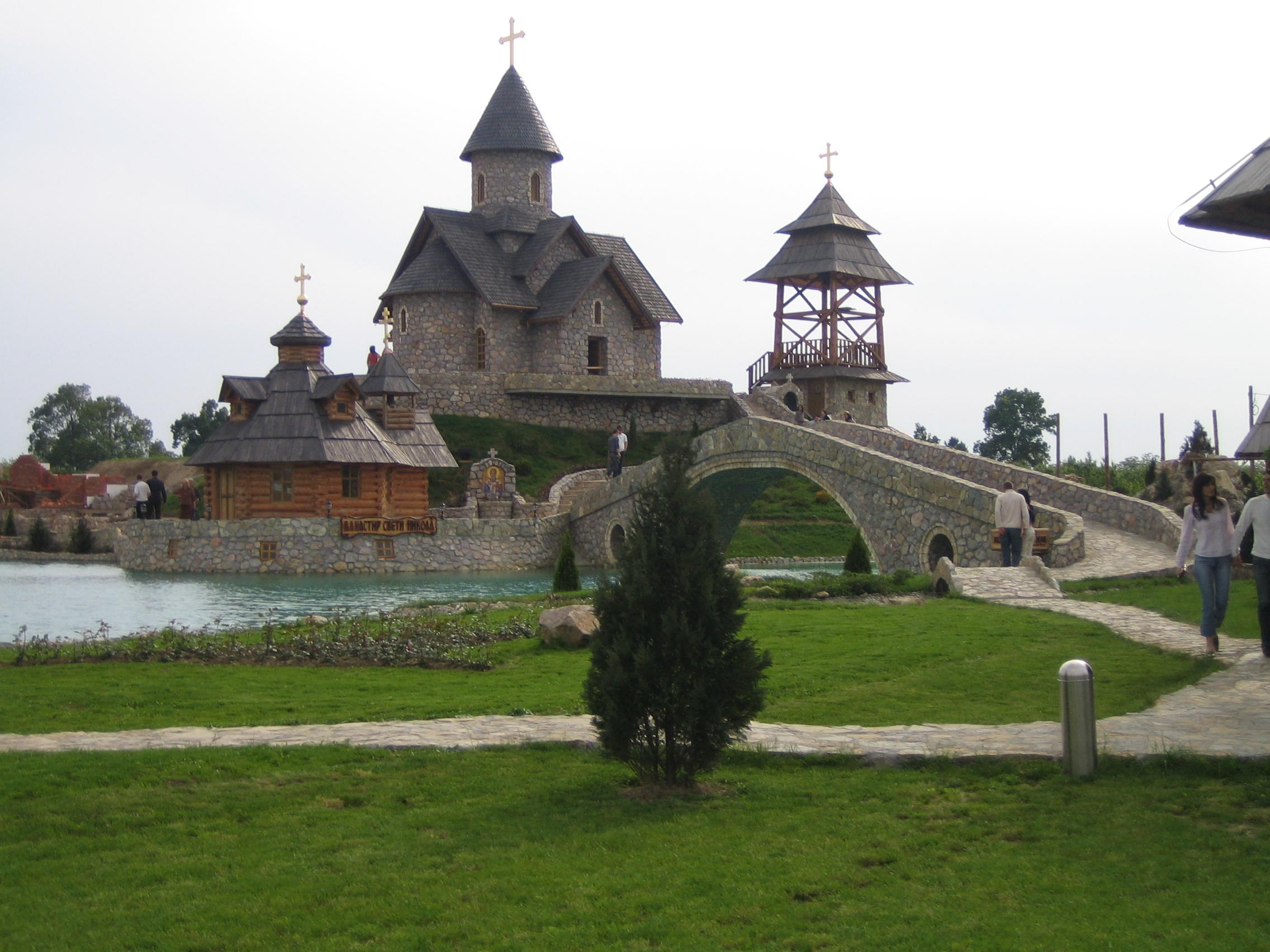
Stanišići ethno village.

Stanišići (Serbian Cyrillic: Станишићи) is an ethno village near Bijeljina in Republika Srpska, Bosnia and Herzegovina, on the Pavlovića road, three kilometers from town. The owner of the complex is Borislav Stanišić, a local entrepreneur. Entrance is free for visitors.

== Contents ==
The complex was built in March 2003. In its beginnings, it consisted of one pond, a tavern and a brook, but it expanded over time and now it contains another pond, two mills, and restaurants with local cuisine prepared in the traditional fireplace. The ethno village is still expanding, by building new objects.

The complex also contains the St. father Nicola monastery, which was consecrated by Zvornik-Tuzla Bishop Vasilije, Zahumlje-Herzegovina Bishop Grigorije and America-Canada Bishop Longin on 22 May 2006. St. father Nicola's and tsar Stefan Uroš's relics have been laid under the throne. After consecration, many baptisms and weddings took place in the monastery.

The ethno village contains several old original barn houses, transported from different locations of former Yugoslavia (the village Brgule near Vareš, Dugandžići near Olovo etc.) Some of these barn houses have become available for rent, in form of two apartments and three rooms with bathrooms. They contain, as well as other objects in the complex, antique furniture, wooden spoons, old cradles and carpets.

Many swans and ducks live here, and a miniature stable is situated near the village, with a horse-riding school available. Three ponies make horse-riding possible for the children, too.

The ethno village organizes carriage and hunter sledge trips around Semberija villages and Drina coast.
