= FK Napredak Donji Šepak =

Football club in Bosnia and Herzegovina

Napredak Donji Šepak
- Full name: Fudbalski klub Napredak Donji Šepak
- Nickname: Crveno-bijeli (The Red-Whites)
- Founded: 1971; 55 years ago
- Ground: Stadion Napretka
- Capacity: 2,000
- Chairman: Jevto Jevtić
- Manager: Nikola Lazarević
- League: Second League RS - East
- 2017–18: First League RS, 12th (relegated)
Home colours

Fudbalski klub Napredak Donji Šepak (Serbian Cyrillic: Фудбалски клуб Напредак Доњи Шепак) is a football club from the village of Donji Šepak near Zvornik, Republika Srpska, Bosnia and Herzegovina. The club competes in the Second League of the Republika Srpska.

The club's biggest success to date have improved is winning fifth place in the First League of the Republika Srpska 2003–04 season.

== History ==
The club was founded 1971 in Yugoslavia, where he competed in local and regional leagues until the breakup of Yugoslavia. After the break caused by the breakup of Yugoslavia, Napredak compete in the first Republika Srpska Cup in the 1993–94 season, and reached the third round. After competing in the Republic of Serbian Cup, the club continues to compete in the Third League of the Republika Srpska, and was eventually promoted to Second League of the Republika Srpska where stayed for six seasons until the end of 2001–02 season.

In the 2001–02 season, the club takes the 2nd position and go to the First League of the Republika Srpska. The club in the First League of the Republika Srpska was competed three seasons. The club has recently become a member of the Second League of the Republika Srpska.

In the 2008–09 season club wins Second League of the Republika Srpska, after which the Football Association of Republika Srpska reduct six points for improper registration of one of the players. Because of this runner-up FK Romanija with one point less instead of Napredak has promoted to the First League of the Republika Srpska.

In the 2016–17 season, the club wins the Second League of the Republika Srpska again, but, as many times before, they had to cancel the entry into the higher league, due to the unsatisfied conditions for the First League of the Republika Srpska. And thus FK Jedinstvo Brčko could take their place as second place and so promoted to the higher tier again.
