= Bijeljina City Stadium =

- Interactive map of Bijeljina City Stadium
- Location: Bijeljina, Bosnia and Herzegovina
- Owner: City of Bijeljina
- Operator: FK Radnik Bijeljina
- Capacity: 6,000 (for football matches); 8,000 (concerts)
- Surface: Grass
- Field size: 105 x 96 m

Construction
- Built: 1954
- Renovated: 2014, 2016

Tenant
- FK Radnik Bijeljina

Bijeljina City Stadium (Serbo-Croatian: Gradski stadion Bijeljina) is a multi-purpose stadium in Bijeljina, Republika Srpska, Bosnia and Herzegovina. It is currently used mostly for football matches and is the home ground of FK Radnik Bijeljina. The stadium has a capacity of 6,000 seats.

The record attendance on the stadium was on the concert of Željko Joksimović on 8 August 2013. Approximately 8,000 people were watching the concert that day.

== Concerts and events ==
- Dragana Mirković – 15 July 2010
- Miroslav Ilić – 6 June 2013
- Željko Joksimović – 8 August 2013 (8,000 people in attendance)
