= Velika Obarska =

Velika Obarska Велика Обарска
Location	Bijeljina, Bosnia and Herzegovina
Population – (est.) – (1991 census)	3,549
Area code	+387 55
Time zone	CET (UTC +1); CEST (UTC +2)
Website	www.OpstinaBijeljina.com

Velika Obarska (Serbian Cyrillic: Велика Обарска) is a village located north-west of the city of Bijeljina in Republika Srpska, Bosnia and Herzegovina.

== Sport ==
Velika Obarska has a football club known as FK Mladost.
