= FK Mladost Gacko =

Association football club in Bosnia and Herzegovina

Mladost Gacko
- Full name: FK Mladost Gacko
- Founded: 1970; 56 years ago
- Ground: Gradski Stadion
- Capacity: 2,000
- Chairman: Siniša Nikolić (acting)
- Manager: Željko Popović
- League: First League of the Republika Srpska
- 2012–13: 9th
Home colours	Away colours

FK Mladost (Serbian Cyrillic: ФК Mлaдocт Гaцкo) is a football club from the town of Gacko, in Republika Srpska, Bosnia and Herzegovina. The club played in the Premier League of Bosnia and Herzegovina in the 2002-03 season. However, due to poor results FK Mladost was relegated to the First League of the Republika Srpska.

== Players ==
For the list of current and former players with Wikipedia article, please see Category:FK Mladost Gacko players.

Note: Flags indicate national team as defined under FIFA eligibility rules; some limited exceptions apply. Players may hold more than one non-FIFA nationality.

No.	Pos.	Nation	Player
—	GK	BIH	Saša Papović
—	GK	BIH	Slobodan Guzina
—	DF	BIH	Rajko Ćeranić
—	DF	BIH	Bojan Mrković
—	DF	BIH	Miljan Vico
—	DF	BIH	Vlado Marković

No.	Pos.	Nation	Player
—	MF	BIH	Dragan Goranović
—	MF	BIH	Srđan Andrić
—	MF	BIH	Velibor Vasiljević
—	MF	BIH	Tihomir Tufegdžić
—	FW	BIH	Miroslav Prelo
—	FW	BIH	Nikola Šušić

For recent transfers, see List of Bosnian football transfers summer 2012.

== Notable players ==
The following former Mladost Gacko players have senior national team appearances:

- (Serbia) Predrag Stefanović
- (Bosnia and Herzegovina) Nemanja Supić
- (Bosnia and Herzegovina) Almir Osmanagić
- (Socialist Federal Republic of Yugoslavia) Milorad Cimirot
- (Montenegro) Slavoljub Bubanja
- (Bosnia and Herzegovina) Ilija Prodanović
- (Montenegro) Željko Damjanović
- (Montenegro) Novica Miković
- (Montenegro) Petar Gušić
- (Bosnia and Herzegovina) Jovica Vico
- (Montenegro) Krsto Perović
- (Bosnia and Herzegovina) Siniša Blagojević
- (Bosnia and Herzegovina) Igor Popović
- (Bosnia and Herzegovina) Velibor Vasiljević
- (Bosnia and Herzegovina) Marko Vidaković
- (Montenegro) Jovo Međedović
- (Montenegro) Miroslav Medan
- (Bosnia and Herzegovina) Gojko Cimirot
- (Montenegro) Miodrag Gardašević
- (Serbia) Nikola Andrić
- (Serbia) Predrag Stojanović
- (Montenegro) Boris Koprivica
- (Montenegro) Nebojša Domazetović
- (Bosnia and Herzegovina) Đoko Ilić
- (Montenegro) Krsto Perović
- (Bosnia and Herzegovina) Miljan Karna
- (Bosnia and Herzegovina) Savo Andrić
- (Bosnia and Herzegovina) Krsto Denda
- (Bosnia and Herzegovina) Marko Vidaković
- (Bosnia and Herzegovina) Miljan Vico
- (Bosnia and Herzegovina) Duško Rašević
- (Bosnia and Herzegovina) Miroslav Prelo
- (Bosnia and Herzegovina) Veselin Klimović
- (Bosnia and Herzegovina) Srđan Andrić
- (Bosnia and Herzegovina) Dragan Goranović
- (Bosnia and Herzegovina) Velibor Radović
- (Bosnia and Herzegovina) Savo Milojević
- (Bosnia and Herzegovina) Dejan Drakul
- (Bosnia and Herzegovina) Rajko Ćeranić
- (Bosnia and Herzegovina) Slobodan Guzina
- (Bosnia and Herzegovina) Svetozar Kašiković
- (Serbia) Bojan Jovin
- (Bosnia and Herzegovina) Bojan Mrković
- (Bosnia and Herzegovina) Saša Šiljegović
- (Bosnia and Herzegovina) Rajko Komnenić
- (Bosnia and Herzegovina) Nikola Sušić
- (Bosnia and Herzegovina) Stevan Bjelogrlić
- (Bosnia and Herzegovina) Novak Sušić
- (Bosnia and Herzegovina) Saša Tepavčević
- (Bosnia and Herzegovina) Novica Berak
- (Bosnia and Herzegovina) Tihomir Tufegdžić
- (Bosnia and Herzegovina) Dejan Lozo
- (Bosnia and Herzegovina) Vladimir Marković
- (Bosnia and Herzegovina) Đorđe Salatić
- (Bosnia and Herzegovina) Milosav Dangubić
- (Bosnia and Herzegovina) Marko Drakul
- (Bosnia and Herzegovina) Nemanja Mulina
- (Bosnia and Herzegovina) Novica Mučibabić
- (Bosnia and Herzegovina) Aleksandar Mumalo
- (Bosnia and Herzegovina) Nikola Koprivica
- (Bosnia and Herzegovina) Marko Toholj
- (Bosnia and Herzegovina) Slobodan Marković
- (Bosnia and Herzegovina) Čedomir Šuković
- (Bosnia and Herzegovina) Sreten Nikolić
