= FK Borac Šamac =

Borac Šamac
- Full name: FK Borac Šamac
- Founded: 1919
- Ground: Gradski Stadion "Borac", Šamac
- Capacity: 3,000
- Chairman: Milorad Bijelović
- Manager: Miroslav Drinić
- League: Second League of RS (West)
- 2021–22: Second League of RS (West), 6th
Home colours	Away colours

FK Borac Šamac (Serbian Cyrillic: ФК Борац Шaмaц) is a professional football club from the town of Šamac, in northern Bosnia and Herzegovina. The club competes in the Second League of the Republika Srpska (Group West).

== Club records ==
Season	League									CupRS	Cup	Top goalscorer	
Season	Division	P	W	D	L	F	A	Pts	Pos	CupRS	Cup	Player	Goals
2006–07	1st RS	30	16	7	7	61	32	49	2nd		—N/a		
2007–08	1st RS	30	8	8	14	30	44	32	14th		—N/a		
2008–09	1st RS	30	10	7	13	32	39	37	14th		—N/a		
2009–10											—N/a		
2010–11											—N/a		
2011–12											—N/a		
2012–13	1st RS	26	7	7	12	28	45	28	13th		—N/a		
2013–14	1st RS	26	5	5	16	25	42	20	13th		—N/a		
2014–15	2nd RS, W	26	16	6	4	58	31	54	1st		—N/a		
2015–16	1st RS	22	8	6	8	26	23	30	6th		—N/a		
2016–17	1st RS	22	2	4	16	18	51	10	12th		—N/a		
2017–18	2nd RS, W	30	11	3	16	40	51	36	11th		—N/a		
2018–19	2nd RS, W	30	20	2	8	77	33	62	2nd		—N/a		
2019–20	2nd RS, W	15	5	2	8	27	36	17	11th		—N/a		
2020–21	2nd RS, W	15	7	4	4	30	21	25	3rd		—N/a		

Key
League: P = Matches played; W = Matches won; D = Matches drawn; L = Matches lost; F = Goals for; A = Goals against; Pts = Points won; Pos = Final position;
Cup: PR = Preliminary round; QR = Qualifying round; R1 = Round of 32; R2 = Round of 16; QF = Quarter-final; SF = Semi-final; RU = Runner-up; W = Competition won;

Za Šamčane nastupaju Marijan Maslić, Dušan Bijelić, Perica Mićić, Dejan Limić, Boris Marinković, Zoran Perić, Janko Dujmušić, Gabrijel Blagojević, Perica Maksimović, Miloš Ilić, Jovan Sjenčić, Ognjen Nišić, Bernard Majić, Petar Marčeta, Bojan Jaćimović, Rajko Đurić, Darko Đurić, Stojan Stanković, Kristijan Vakić, Bojan Pupčević, Milan Ilić, Nikola Dakić i Sergej Bukva.

=== Notable players ===
For the list of former and current players with Wikipedia article, please see Category:FK Borac Šamac players.

== Historical list of managers ==
- (Bosnia and Herzegovina) Dževad Bekić
- (Bosnia and Herzegovina) Rade Vasiljević
- (Serbia) Slaviša Božičić (2006–2007)
- (Serbia) Mladen Radović
- (Bosnia and Herzegovina) Branislav Berjan (2007–2008)
- (Bosnia and Herzegovina) Predrag Lukić (2014–2016)
- (Bosnia and Herzegovina) Zoran Pupčević (2017)
- (Bosnia and Herzegovina) Dragan Savić (2017)
- (Bosnia and Herzegovina) Nikola Nikić (2017–2018)
- (Bosnia and Herzegovina) Mitar Lukić (2019–)
