= FK Radnik Bijeljina =

Bosnian association football club

Radnik Bijeljina
- Full name: Fudbalski klub Radnik Bijeljina
- Founded: 14 June 1945; 81 years ago
- Ground: Gradski Stadion, Bijeljina
- Capacity: 6,000
- Chairman: Nedeljko Ćorić
- Manager: Bojan Krulj
- League: Premier League BH
- 2025–26: Premier League BH, 7th of 10
- Website: fkradnikbijeljina.com
Home colours	Away colours

Fudbalski klub Radnik Bijeljina (Serbian Cyrillic: Фудбалски клуб Радник Бијељина) is a professional association football club based in the city of Bijeljina that is situated in northeast Bosnia and Herzegovina. The club plays its home matches on the Bijeljina City Stadium, which has a capacity of 6,000 seats. They compete in the Premier League of Bosnia and Herzegovina. The name Radnik means worker.

Radnik won its first First League of the Republika Srpska title in the 1998–99 season, and the second in the 2004–05 season, after which the club got promoted to the Bosnian Premier League. The club was relegated from the Bosnian Premier League in the 2006–07 season.

In the 2011–12 season, Radnik once again won the title in the First League of RS and won a second promotion to the Premier League, where they played until the 2021–22 season.

In the 2015–16 season, Radnik had, so far, their biggest success, winning its first national trophy, the Bosnia and Herzegovina Football Cup, after they beat FK Sloboda Tuzla in the two-legged cup final (1–1 in Bijeljina and 0–3 in Tuzla). Winning the cup, the club qualified to the 2016–17 UEFA Europa League qualifying rounds, its first UEFA competition.

== History ==
The first football was brought to Bijeljina in 1916. The first football club was FK Podrinje which was formed in 1919. Later other clubs were formed such as FK Zora in 1920, FK Građanski in 1923, and FK Semberija in 1935. The clubs from this entire region of Posavlje and Podrinje played in the provincial leagues of the Belgrade Football Subassociation. After the end of World War II, FK Radnik was formed.

=== 1945–1990 ===
FK Radnik Bijeljina was founded on 14 June 1945. It didn't take long for Radnik to win their first trophy. In 1948 they became champions of the Tuzla District beating FK Sloboda Tuzla in the final. A year later, the club reached the 1/16 round of the Yugoslav Cup. In 1957, Radnik entered into the Novi Sad/Srem zone (regional league). In season 1971–72, Radnik became champions of the regional Republic League of Bosnia and Herzegovina and they entered a playoff for a place in the Yugoslav Second League. The club played FK Sloga from Vukovar in the playoff where it won both matches, 4–0 in Bijeljina and 8–0 in Vukovar. It entered the 2nd League of Yugoslavia playing against clubs such as FK Proleter Zrenjanin and FK Bečej. They stayed in the Yugoslav Second League for six seasons, being its best classification in the season 1977–78 when they finished 10th.

Another great achievement of FK Radnik Bijeljina was when the junior team won the Bosnia and Herzegovina Cup in 1987. In the semi-final, they beat FK Velež Mostar in Mostar by 5–2. In the final, Radnik beat FK Polet Bosanski Brod in the penalties to win the trophy.

=== 1990s ===
From 1995 to 1997, the club was called FK Panteri Bijeljina and played under that name in the first two seasons of the First League of the Republika Srpska. In the 1998–99 season, Radnik Bijeljina won their first First League of RS title, an achievement reached again in the 2004–05 season.

=== 2000s ===
In the season 2004–05, Radnik won their second Republika Srpska title which got them a place in the Bosnian Premier League for the 2005–06 season. In the 2005–06 season, Radnik finished 13th. A year earlier it had reached the 1/4 finals of the Bosnian Cup.

In the Republika Srpska Cup, after being twice a losing finalist in the 2005–06 and 2008–09 editions, it finally won the Cup in the 2009–10 cup season.

=== 2010s ===
Radnik won its first national trophy in 2016, winning the Bosnian Cup in the 2015–16 season, beating Sloboda Tuzla in the final (agg. 4–1). This way Radnik won a spot in the 2016–17 UEFA Europa League qualifying rounds. Even though they put up a good fight, Radnik got eliminated in the first qualifying round by Bulgarian First League club PFC Beroe Stara Zagora (agg. 2–0).

In the 2018–19 Bosnian Premier League season, Radnik finished on 5th place, but as 4th placed FK Željezničar Sarajevo didn't get an UEFA license to compete in that season's league, Radnik got qualified by default to the 2019–20 UEFA Europa League qualifying rounds. The club got eliminated by FC Spartak Trnava in the first qualifying round, after beating Spartak in the first match in Banja Luka 2–0, but it got eliminetd by Spartak in Trnava in the second match after penalties (2–3 on penalties for Spartak), since the Slovak side defeated Radnik 2–0 in regular time as well.

=== 2020s ===
On 28 March 2020, five years after becoming club chairman of the board, Mladen Krstajić decided to leave Radnik, with Predrag Perković becoming the new club chairman.

In September 2022, fans waved a flag of the Totenkopf Division which is widely viewed as a hate symbol.

== Honours ==
=== Domestic ===
==== League ====
- First League of the Republika Srpska:
  - Winners (4): 1998–99, 2004–05, 2011–12, 2023–24
  - Runners-up (1): 2009–10
- Bosnia and Herzegovina Republic League: (Yugoslav third level)
  - Winners (2): 1948–49, 1971–72

==== Cups ====
- Bosnia and Herzegovina Cup:
  - Winners (1): 2015–16
- Republika Srpska Cup:
  - Winners (7): 2009–10, 2012–13, 2013–14, 2015–16, 2016–17, 2017–18, 2018–19
  - Runners-up (4): 2006–07, 2008–09, 2010–11, 2025–26

== European record ==
As of 18 July 2019

Competition	P	W	D	L	GF	GA	GD
UEFA Europa League	4	1	1	2	2	4	−2
Total	4	1	1	2	2	4	–2

P = Matches played; W = Matches won; D = Matches drawn; L = Matches lost; GF = Goals for; GA = Goals against; GD = Goals difference. Defunct competitions indicated in italics.

=== List of matches ===
Season	Competition	Round	Opponent	Home	Away	Agg.
2016–17	UEFA Europa League	1Q	(Bulgaria) Beroe Stara Zagora	0–2	0–0	0–2
2019–20	UEFA Europa League	1Q	(Slovakia) Spartak Trnava	2–0	0–2 (a.e.t)	2–2 (2–3 p)

== Players ==
=== Current squad ===
As of 14 October 2026

Note: Flags indicate national team as defined under FIFA eligibility rules; some limited exceptions apply. Players may hold more than one non-FIFA nationality.

No.	Pos.	Nation	Player
1	GK	SRB	Dušan Marković
3	DF	SRB	Slaviša Radović
4	DF	ZIM	Tivonge Rushesha
5	DF	CMR	Blondon Meyapya
6	MF	GHA	Felix Osei Agyemang
7	MF	BEL	Indy Boonen
8	MF	CRO	Tino Blaž Lauš
9	FW	SRB	Njegoš Kupusović
10	MF	CRO	Emanuel Črnko
11	FW	BIH	Ognjen Klenpić
14	DF	SRB	Andrija Marković
15	MF	ESP	Pedro Torres Valero
16	DF	BIH	Božidar Dimitrić
17	FW	SRB	Luka Cvetićanin
19	MF	BIH	Huso Karjašević
20	FW	BIH	Vladimir Bradonjić
21	MF	BIH	Marko Bardak

No.	Pos.	Nation	Player
22	DF	BIH	Mustafa Šukilović
25	MF	BIH	Andrej Krstić
26	DF	BIH	Đorđe Ćosić
27	GK	BIH	Vedran Kjosevski
28	DF	AUS	Malik Chamseddine
29	FW	BIH	Danilo Teodorović (captain)
32	MF	CRO	Mateo Andačić
33	FW	SRB	Slobodan Stanojlović
66	DF	SRB	Miladin Stevanović
70	MF	FRA	Ateef Konaté
77	MF	FRA	Mohamed Ghorzi
85	DF	CRO	Patrik Klančir
88	MF	ROU	Luca Mihai
99	FW	NGR	Anthony Ijoma
—	GK	CRO	Srđan Nedić
—	FW	BIH	Andrija Lošić

== Club officials ==
=== Technical staff ===
Current technical staff
- Manager: (Serbia) Bojan Krulj
- Assistant coach: (Bosnia and Herzegovina) Jovo Borković
- Goalkeeping coach: (Bosnia and Herzegovina) Zoran Sofrenić
- Fitness coach: (Serbia) Vladan Popović
- Physiotherapist: (Bosnia and Herzegovina) Nikola Savić
- Kit manager: (Bosnia and Herzegovina) Žiko Stokanović
- Doctor: (Bosnia and Herzegovina) Đoko Novaković

=== Club management ===
Current management
- Chairman of the Board: (Bosnia and Herzegovina) Nedeljko Ćorić
- General secretary: (Bosnia and Herzegovina) Slobodan Đorđić

== Managerial history ==
- (Bosnia and Herzegovina) Ivan Mioč
- (Bosnia and Herzegovina) Radomir Jovičić
- (Bosnia and Herzegovina) Živorad Miražić
- (Bosnia and Herzegovina) Zoran Jagodić
- (Serbia) Miroslav Milanović
- (Serbia) Dušan Jevrić
- (Bosnia and Herzegovina) Nikola Bala
- (Bosnia and Herzegovina) Dragan Radović
- (Bosnia and Herzegovina) Darko Nestorović (1 July 2011 – 27 August 2012)
- (Bosnia and Herzegovina) Srđan Bajić (1 September 2012 – 3 September 2014)
- (Serbia) Slavko Petrović (5 September 2014 – 23 August 2016)
- (Serbia) Nebojša Milošević (24 August 2016 – 9 May 2017)
- (Bosnia and Herzegovina) Mladen Žižović (9 May 2017 (Note: Žižović served as caretaker manager until 26 May 2017, when he was hired on a permanent basis.) – 11 November 2019)
- (Bosnia and Herzegovina) Slobodan Starčević (11 November 2019 – 13 January 2020)
- (Serbia) Slavko Petrović (13 January 2020 – 16 November 2020)
- (Bosnia and Herzegovina) Darko Nestorović (24 November 2020 – 16 April 2021)
- (Bosnia and Herzegovina) Vlado Jagodić (21 April 2021 – 25 October 2021)
- (Bosnia and Herzegovina) Velibor Đurić (25 October 2021 – 1 April 2025)
- (Bosnia and Herzegovina) Duško Vranešević (2 April 2025 – 5 June 2026)
- (Serbia) Bojan Krulj (11 June 2026 – present)
