= Gradski stadion Luke (Mrkonjić Grad) =

Stadium in Bosnia and Herzegovina

Gradski Stadion Luke
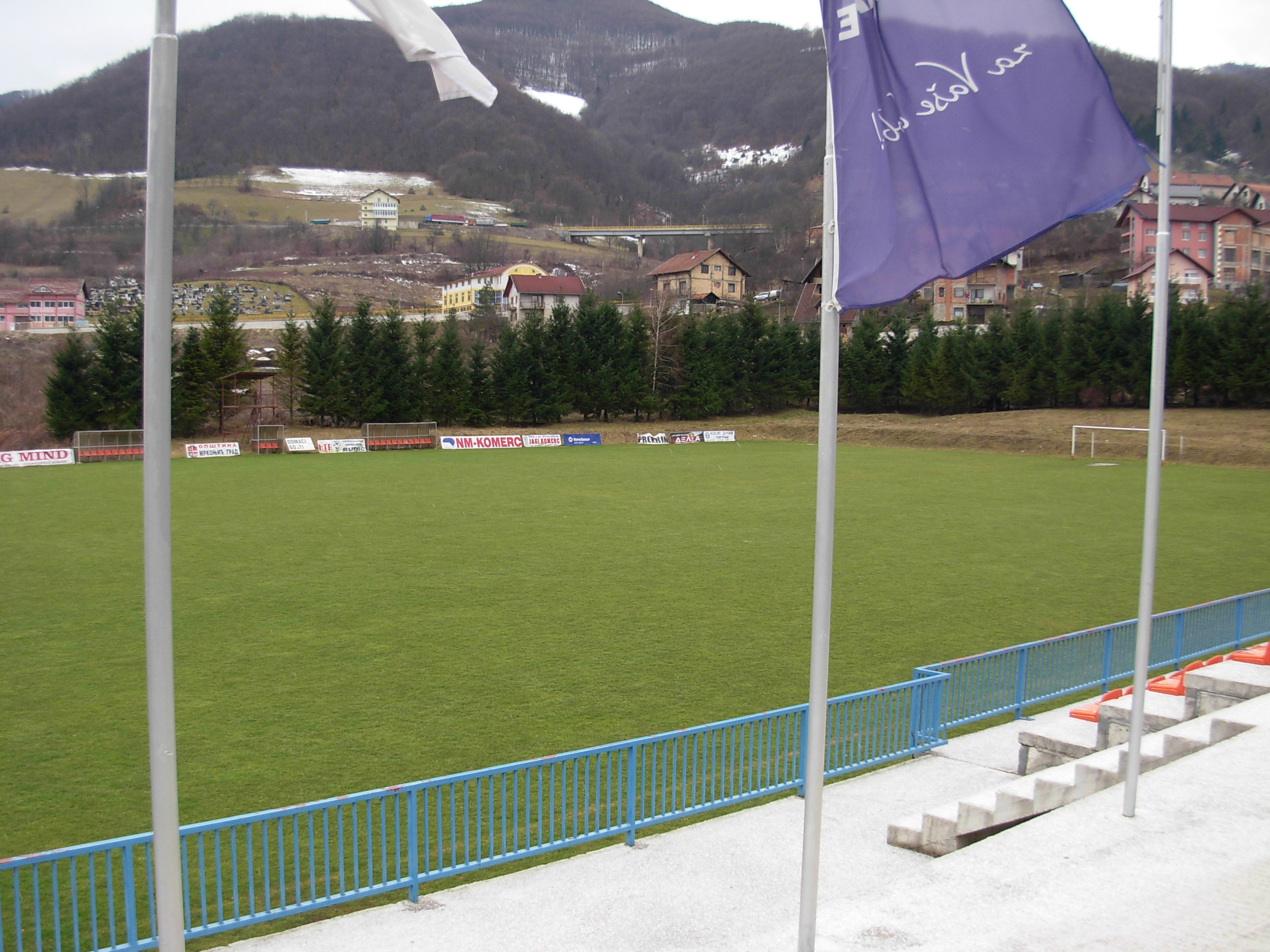
- Interactive map of Gradski Stadion Luke
- Full name: Gradski Stadion Luke Mrkonjić Grad
- Location: Mrkonjić Grad, Bosnia and Herzegovina
- Coordinates: 44.411214°N 17.084974°E
- Owner: FK Sloboda Mrkonjić Grad
- Operator: FK Sloboda Mrkonjić Grad
- Capacity: 2,000 (seated)
- Surface: Grass
- Scoreboard: No
- Field size: 100 x 65 m

Construction
- Opened: 1945
- Expanded: 2009, 2021

Tenant
- FK Sloboda Mrkonjić Grad (1945–present)

Gradski Stadion Luke is a multi-purpose stadium in Mrkonjić Grad, Bosnia and Herzegovina. It is currently used mostly for football matches and is the home ground of FK Sloboda Mrkonjić Grad of the Second League of the Republika Srpska. The stadium holds 2,000 spectators.
