= FK Rudar Ugljevik =

Bosnian association football club

Rudar Ugljevik
- Full name: Fudbalski klub Rudar Ugljevik
- Founded: 1925
- Ground: Novi Gradski Stadion
- Capacity: 5,000
- Chairman: Vlado Gajić
- Manager: Goran Ljubojević
- League: Second League of Republika Srpska
- 2013–14: 14th
Home colours	Away colours

FK Rudar Ugljevik (Serbian Cyrillic: ФК Рудар Угљевик) is a football club from the town of Ugljevik, Republika Srpska, Bosnia and Herzegovina. The club played in the Premier League of Bosnia and Herzegovina during the 2004–05 season. However, they were relegated to the First League of the Republika Srpska at the end of the season.

== Stadium ==
Their stadium, Rudara stadium, was opened in 2000 and was the first stadium in Bosnia and Herzegovina to receive a UEFA license. In 2017, it was sold to Boris Stanišić, the owner of the Stanišići ethno-village and football club FK Zvijezda 09.

== Achievements ==
First League of Republika Srpska:

- Winners (2): 1996–97, 1997–98

Republika Srpska Cup:

- Winners (2): 1997–98, 1998–99

== Players ==
For the list of current and former players with Wikipedia article, please see Category:FK Rudar Ugljevik players.

== Managers ==
- (Bosnia and Herzegovina) Zoran Jagodić
- (Serbia) Velimir Đorđević
- (Bosnia and Herzegovina) Radomir Jovičić
- (Bosnia and Herzegovina) Milomir Odović
- (Serbia) Zvonko Ivezić
- (Serbia) Zvonko Živković
- (Bosnia and Herzegovina) Predrag Marić
- (Bosnia and Herzegovina) Dragomir Jovičić
- (Bosnia and Herzegovina) Goran Ljubojević
