= FK Proleter Teslić =

Proleter Teslić
- Full name: Fudbalski klub Proleter Teslić
- Founded: 1926
- Ground: Stadion Radolinka
- Capacity: 2,300
- Chairman: Neven Majstorović
- Manager: Nebojša Đekanović
- League: Second League RS
Home colours	Away colours

Fudbalski klub Proleter Teslić (Serbian Cyrillic: Фудбалски клуб Пpoлeтep Tecлић) is a football club from Teslić, in Republika Srpska, Bosnia and Herzegovina. They play in the second division of the Republika Srpska championship. Until 2007 Proleter was playing in the 2nd division, when they qualified for the first league after 11 years. The club plays its home matches on the Radolinka stadium .

Proleter was founded in 1926 and played mostly in lower Yugoslav leagues.

== Coaching history ==
- (Bosnia and Herzegovina) Ljubiša Tripunović
- (Bosnia and Herzegovina) Zoran Ćurguz
- (Croatia) Anto Petrović
- (Bosnia and Herzegovina) Darko Vojvodić
- (Bosnia and Herzegovina) Zoran Dujaković
- (Serbia) Mihajlo Bošnjak
- (Sweden) Nemanja Miljanović
- (Bosnia and Herzegovina) Darijan Grbić
- (Bosnia and Herzegovina) Zoran Ćurguz
- (Bosnia and Herzegovina) Nebojša Đekanović
- (Serbia) Mile Lazarević
- (Bosnia and Herzegovina) Nebojša Đekanović
- (Bosnia and Herzegovina) Zoran Dujaković (Piljar)

== Bibliography ==
- Vladan Lausevic (15 January 2026), How My Local Football Club Became a Casualty of Bosnia’s War, Stockholm: Balkan Insight

== External sources ==
- FK Proleter Teslić at FSRS
- Club at RS Sport
