= FK Sloboda Mrkonjić Grad =

Sloboda Mrkonjić Grad
- Full name: Fudbalski klub Sloboda Mrkonjić Grad
- Founded: May 7, 1945; 80 years ago
- Ground: Gradski Stadion Luke; Mrkonjić Grad, Bosnia and Herzegovina
- Capacity: 2,000
- Chairman: Borislav Šarić
- Manager: Darko Maletić
- League: First League of RS
- 2023–24: First League of RS, 8th
Home colours	Away colours	Third colours

Fudbalski klub Sloboda Mrkonjić Grad (Serbian Cyrillic: Фудбалски клуб Cлoбoдa Mpкoњић Гpaд) is a football club from the town of Mrkonjić Grad, Republika Srpska, Bosnia and Herzegovina.

== Club management ==
Current management
- President: (Bosnia and Herzegovina) Borislav Šarić
- Vice-president: (Bosnia and Herzegovina) -
- Sport director: (Bosnia and Herzegovina) -
- General secretary: (Bosnia and Herzegovina) Pero Mitrić

== Coaching history ==
- (Bosnia and Herzegovina) Milorad Glamočak (2007–2008)
- (Bosnia and Herzegovina) Dragan Vukša (2008–2010)
- (Bosnia and Herzegovina) Darko Nestorović (2010–2011)
- (Bosnia and Herzegovina) Zoran Dragišić (2011 – 16 June 2014)
- (Bosnia and Herzegovina) Đorđe Inđić (13 July 2014 – 14 December 2014)
- (Bosnia and Herzegovina) Vule Trivunović (1 January 2015 – 30 June 2015)
- (Bosnia and Herzegovina) Dragan Vukša (15 October 2015 – 21 May 2017)
- (Bosnia and Herzegovina) Igor Mirković (29 June 2020 – 14 November 2021)
- (Bosnia and Herzegovina) Darko Maletić (22 January 2022 – present)

== Club presidents ==
- (Bosnia and Herzegovina) Draženko Vasić (2007–2009)
- (Bosnia and Herzegovina) Boro Rudić (2009–2013)
- (Bosnia and Herzegovina) Željko Stipanović (2013–?)
- (Bosnia and Herzegovina) Milenko Milekić
- (Bosnia and Herzegovina) Borislav Šarić (2021–present)

== Kit manufacturers and shirt sponsors ==
Period	Kit Manufacturer	Shirt Sponsor
2008–2010	Nike	NM Komerc
2011–?	Bull	HE na Vrbasu
2021–present	GB3	Nova Banka

== Honours ==
=== Domestic ===
National Championships

- First League of Republika Srpska:
  - Runners-up: 2012–13
  - Third Place: 2011–12
  - Third Place: 2013–14

==== Cups ====
Republika Srpska Cup:

- Runners-up: 2011/12

== External sources ==
- FK Sloboda Mrkonjić Grad at FSRS
- FK Sloboda Mrkonjić Grad at RS-sport
