= FK Podrinje Janja =

Podrinje
- Full name: FK Podrinje Janja
- Founded: 1927; 99 years ago
- Ground: Stadion Poloj
- Capacity: 4,000
- Chairman: Mujo Bogaljević
- Manager: Muhamed Jusufović
- League: First League of RS
- 2021–22: First League of RS, 14th
Home colours	Away colours

FK Podrinje Janja (Serbian Cyrillic: ФК Пoдpињe Jaњa) is a football club from the town of Janja, Bosnia and Herzegovina. It is one of the oldest clubs in the country.

== Players ==
Many players begin their career in the club. One famous example is Savo Milošević, who after playing in Podrinje signed with Belgrade's FK Partizan. Following, Savo had a worldwide famous career as a famous Serbian international footballer.

=== Current squad ===
As of 23 May 2023

Note: Flags indicate national team as defined under FIFA eligibility rules; some limited exceptions apply. Players may hold more than one non-FIFA nationality.

No.	Pos.	Nation	Player
1	GK	BIH	Mirnes Sito
2	MF	BIH	Milivoje Simić
3	MF	BIH	Borislav Erić
4	DF	BIH	Mirza Bradarić
5	DF	BIH	Filip Jovanović
6	DF	BIH	Nikola Mazić
7	MF	SRB	Amel Lakota
8	MF	BIH	Nemanja Stevanović
9	FW	BIH	Stefan Bozić
10	MF	BIH	Adel Adić
11	MF	BIH	Abdullah Dzafo
12	GK	BIH	Edis Sehović

No.	Pos.	Nation	Player
14	FW	AUT	Samir Delalić
15	MF	SRB	Nikola Nikolić
16	MF	BIH	Nikola Pantić
17	FW	BIH	Adel Jahić
18	FW	SRB	Vuk Vukicević
19	MF	BIH	Filip Jovicić
20	DF	BIH	Vinko Djurić
21	MF	BIH	Nezir Alić
22	MF	SRB	Nebojsa Stevanović
—	MF	BIH	Tarik Adilović
—	MF	BIH	Abdulaziz Raipović

== Historical list of managers ==
- (Bosnia and Herzegovina) Senad Hadžić (February 1, 2014 – February 20, 2015)
- (Serbia) Miroslav Milanović (February 27, 2015 – July 31, 2016)
- (Bosnia and Herzegovina) Senad Hadžić (August 1, 2016 – September 24, 2018)
- (Bosnia and Herzegovina) Muhamed Jusufović (March 1, 2019 – June 30, 2019)
- (Bosnia and Herzegovina) Zumbul Mahalbašić (July 7, 2019 – October 2, 2019)
- (Bosnia and Herzegovina) Muhamed Jusufović (October 4, 2019 – present)
