= FK Sutjeska Foča =

Sutjeska Foča
- Full name: Fudbalski klub Sutjeska Foča
- Founded: 23 February 1946; 80 years ago
- Ground: Gradski stadion, Foča
- Capacity: 4,000
- Chairman: Radenko Vasiljević
- Manager: Duško Rašević
- League: First League of RS
- 2023–24: First League of RS, 10th
Home colours	Away colours

Fudbalski klub Sutjeska Foča (Serbian Cyrillic: Фудбалски клуб Cутjecкa Фoчa) is a professional association football club based in the town of Foča that is situated in southern Bosnia and Herzegovina.

Sutjeska currently plays in the First League of the Republika Srpska. The club plays its home matches at the Foča City Stadium, which has a capacity of 4,000 seats.

== History ==
The first football clubs in Foča were Graničar and Sloga founded in 1920. In 1925 Sloga was merged into Graničar. In 1927 a club named Jugović was formed and in 1930 it will also be merged into Graničar. Graničar will become one of the most active clubs in Podrinje region. The stadium of Graničar was located in the same place were the current Gradski Stadion is located.

In 1946, after the end of the Second World War, FK Sutjeska is founded, and it is named after the Battle of Sutjeska in which numerous players of Graničar lost their lives fighting against the Axis forces. The club will play in regional levels all the way until the late 1970s, when coached by Maglalija, they will be promoted to the Bosnia and Herzegovina Republic League (one of Yugoslav third levels at the time) for the season 1979–80. However in their first season they will be relegated and will stay in regional leagues all the way until the start of the Yugoslav Wars in the early 1990s.

Numerous club players had spells in major Yugoslav and foreign clubs: Miroslav Visočki, Refik Muftić, Stole Blagojević, Ekrem Maglalija, Faruk Hadžimešić, Rasim Ahmetović, Miloš Nedić and Predrag Koprivica all played in FK Sarajevo, while in their city rivals FK Željezničar Sarajevo played Dragan Popadić, Josip Šimović, Rade Paprica, Duško Ivanović, Zoran Paprica and Radmilo Mihajlović; in Belgrade's FK Partizan played Mladen Furtula and Rešad Kunovac; in NK Čelik Zenica played Vušković, Mojović and Živković; while in HNK Hajduk Split played Ranko Sekulić. Radmilo Mihajlović later played in Germany with Schalke 04 and Bayern Munich, Refik Muftić in Austrian Sturm Graz, and Mladen Furtula and Rade Paprica in Greek PAOK.

The war in Bosnia started in 1992 and all football competitions were abandoned. However by mid-1993 a group of enthusiasts led by Rada Šobota organised the first football cup in entire Republika Srpska and it was played in the stadium of Sutjeska. Among other local teams, FK Sutjeska Nikšić from the neighbouring FR Yugoslavia also participated, being that considered the first international visit in the Republika Srpska after the start of the war.

In the season 1995–96 Sutjeska played in the Second League of the Republika Srpska and by finishing second it qualified for the First League of the Republika Srpska play-offs. There, they meat FK Željezničar from Istočno Sarajevo and after losing 3–1 away, Sutjeska won in Foča by 7–3 thus grabbing a spot in the next RS first league season. However, they will only play one season in the top tier of RS, as they ended up relegated at the end of the season.

In the season 2006–07 Sutjeska returned to the First League of the Republika Srpska, now being a second tier of Bosnia and Herzegovina football league system, where it consistently played during the following seasons. It wasn't until the 2018–19 season in which Sutjeske got relegated back to the Second League of RS.

== Players ==
=== Current squad ===
As of 23 May 2023

Note: Flags indicate national team as defined under FIFA eligibility rules; some limited exceptions apply. Players may hold more than one non-FIFA nationality.

No.	Pos.	Nation	Player
4	DF	BIH	Vide Ivanović
7	FW	BIH	Dejan Rašević
8	MF	BIH	Dejan Jolović
9	FW	BIH	Boško Radović
10	MF	BIH	Nikola Mojović
12	GK	BIH	Darko Krnojelac
13	MF	BIH	Djordje Milutinović
14	DF	BIH	Marko Ivanović
15	DF	BIH	Bojan Mihajlović

No.	Pos.	Nation	Player
16	MF	BIH	Zoran Obrenović
17	MF	GER	Nenad Stanojević
18	DF	BIH	Milan Vladicić
19	MF	BIH	Jovica Dacević
20	MF	BIH	Pavle Bonić
23	DF	BIH	Igor Ateljević
30	MF	BIH	Slavisa Ristović
55	GK	BIH	Milos Pajević
—	DF	BIH	Ognjen Mojović

For the list of current and former players with Wikipedia article, please see Category:FK Sutjeska Foča players.

== Historical list of managers ==
- Darko Vojvodić (2009)
- Milenko Radić
- Nikola Bala
- Dragan Radović
- Momčilo Stanić
- Duško Rašević
- Darko Nestorović (2012–14)
- Branko Vučković
- Miljan Radanović
- Filip Ikonić
- Duško Rašević
