= Elvir Koljić =

Bosnian footballer (born 1995)

Personal information
- Date of birth: 8 July 1995 (age 31)
- Place of birth: Valladolid, Spain
- Height: 1.91 m (6 ft 3 in)
- Position: Forward

Team information
- Current team: Iraklis
- Number: 7

Youth career
- 2005–2011: NK Ključ
- 2011–2013: Maribor

Senior career*
Years	Team	Apps	(Gls)
2013–2014	Triglav	1	(0)
2014–2015	Krupa	5	(0)
2015–2016	Borac Banja Luka	29	(2)
2016–2018	Krupa	59	(38)
2018	→ Lech Poznań (loan)	5	(0)
2018	→ Lech Poznań II (loan)	3	(1)
2018–2025	Universitatea Craiova	138	(41)
2025–2026	Rapid București	43	(6)
2026–	Iraklis	5	(0)

International career
2018–2020	Bosnia and Herzegovina	4	(0)
- * Club domestic league appearances and goals as of 24 October 2026

Elvir Koljić (Bosnian pronunciation: [ělʋir kôːʎitɕ]; born 8 July 1995) is a Bosnian professional footballer who plays as a forward for Super League Greece club Iraklis.

Koljić started his professional career at Triglav, before joining Krupa in 2014. A year later, he moved to Borac Banja Luka. The following year, he went back to Krupa, who loaned him to Lech Poznań in 2018. Later that year, he signed with Universitatea Craiova.

Koljić made his senior international debut for Bosnia and Herzegovina in 2018.

== Club career ==
=== Early career ===
Koljić started playing football at a local club, before joining youth academy of Slovenian team Maribor in 2011. He made his professional debut playing for Triglav against Olimpija Ljubljana on 26 October 2013 at the age of 18.

In the summer of 2014, he moved to Krupa.

In February 2015, he switched to Borac Banja Luka. On 25 April, he scored his first professional goal against Radnik Bijeljina.

In January 2016, Koljić returned to Krupa. He scored his first career hat-trick in a triumph over Rudar Prijedor on 29 November 2017. In February 2018, he was loaned to Polish side Lech Poznań until the end of season.

=== Universitatea Craiova ===
In August, Koljić was transferred to Romanian outfit Universitatea Craiova for an undisclosed fee. He made his official debut for the team against Dinamo București on 1 September and managed to score a goal.

In July 2020, he extended his contract until June 2025.

He won his first trophy with the club on 22 May 2021, by beating Astra in Cupa României final.

=== Rapid Bucureşti ===
On 6 February 2025, Koljić signed a one-year deal with Rapid București.

== International career ==
In January 2018, Koljić received his first senior call-up to Bosnia and Herzegovina, for friendly games against the United States and Mexico. He debuted against the former on 28 January.

== Career statistics ==
=== Club ===
As of match played 24 October 2026

Appearances and goals by club, season and competition
Club	Season	League			National cup (Note: Includes Bosnia and Herzegovina Cup, Cupa României, Greek Cup)		Continental		Other		Total	
Club	Season	Division	Apps	Goals	Apps	Goals	Apps	Goals	Apps	Goals	Apps	Goals
Triglav	2013–14	Slovenian PrvaLiga	1	0	0	0	—		—		1	0
Krupa	2014–15	First League of RS	5	0	—		—		—		5	0
Borac Banja Luka	2014–15	Bosnian Premier League	15	2	4	0	—		—		19	2
Borac Banja Luka	2015–16	Bosnian Premier League	14	0	2	0	—		—		16	0
Borac Banja Luka	Total		29	2	6	0	—		—		35	2
Krupa	2015–16	First League of RS	11	11	—		—		—		11	11
Krupa	2016–17	Bosnian Premier League	26	13	1	0	—		—		27	13
Krupa	2017–18	Bosnian Premier League	15	6	3	5	—		—		18	11
Krupa	2018–19	Bosnian Premier League	7	8	0	0	—		—		7	8
Krupa	Total		59	38	4	5	—		—		63	43
Lech Poznań (loan)	2017–18	Ekstraklasa	5	0	—		—		—		5	0
Lech Poznań II (loan)	2017–18	III liga, group II	3	1	—		—		—		3	1
Universitatea Craiova	2018–19	Liga I	19	13	2	1	—		—		21	14
Universitatea Craiova	2019–20	Liga I	15	6	3	0	0	0	—		18	6
Universitatea Craiova	2020–21	Liga I	8	6	1	0	1 (Note: Appearance in UEFA Europa League)	0	—		10	6
Universitatea Craiova	2021–22	Liga I	31	4	5	2	2 (Note: Appearances in UEFA Europa Conference League)	0	2 (Note: One appearance in Supercupa României, one appearance and one goal in Liga I play-offs for UEFA Europa Conference League)	1	40	7
Universitatea Craiova	2022–23	Liga I	25	5	0	0	6	0	—		31	5
Universitatea Craiova	2023–24	Liga I	22	4	3	1	—		1 (Note: Appearance in Liga I play-offs for UEFA Europa Conference League)	0	26	5
Universitatea Craiova	2024–25	Liga I	18	3	2	0	2	1	—		22	4
Universitatea Craiova	Total		138	41	16	4	11	1	3	1	168	47
Rapid București	2024–25	Liga I	10	2	2	0	—		—		12	2
Rapid București	2025–26	Liga I	33	4	1	0	—		—		34	4
Rapid București	Total		43	6	3	0	—		—		46	6
Iraklis	2026–27	Super League Greece	5	0	1	0	—		—		6	0
Career total			288	88	30	9	11	1	3	1	332	99

=== International ===
As of match played 7 September 2020

Appearances and goals by national team and year
National team	Year	Apps	Goals
Bosnia and Herzegovina
Bosnia and Herzegovina	2018	2	0
Bosnia and Herzegovina	2019	1	0
Bosnia and Herzegovina	2020	1	0
Total		4	0

== Honours ==
Krupa

- First League of RS: 2015–16

Universitatea Craiova

- Cupa României: 2020–21
- Supercupa României: 2021
