= Ajdin Redžić =

Bosnian footballer

Personal information
- Date of birth: 25 January 1997 (age 29)
- Place of birth: Bihać, Bosnia and Herzegovina
- Height: 1.78 m (5 ft 10 in)
- Position: Midfielder

Team information
- Current team: Sloga Doboj
- Number: 14

Youth career
- Jedinstvo Bihać
- –2014: Rudar Prijedor

Senior career*
Years	Team	Apps	(Gls)
2014	Rudar Prijedor	0	(0)
2015–2016	Borac Banja Luka	35	(3)
2016–2021	Krupa	81	(2)
2021–2022	Rudar Prijedor	20	(0)
2022–2023	Krupa	34	(2)
2023–2024	Sloga Doboj	28	(0)
2024–2025	Asteras Tripolis	4	(0)
2026–	Sloga Doboj	24	(0)

International career
2015	Bosnia and Herzegovina U19	5	(0)
2015–2019	Bosnia and Herzegovina U21	9	(0)
- * Club domestic league appearances and goals as of 20 September 2026

Ajdin Redžić (born 25 January 1997) is a Bosnian professional footballer who plays as a midfielder for Bosnian Premier League club Sloga Doboj.

== Career ==
In 2024, Redžić joined Asteras Tripolis.

== Career statistics ==
As of match played 20 September 2026

Appearances and goals by club, season and competition
Club	Season	League			National cup (Note: Includes Bosnian Cup, Greek Cup)		Total	
Club	Season	Division	Apps	Goals	Apps	Goals	Apps	Goals
Borac Banja Luka	2014–15	Bosnian Premier League	14	0	1	0	15	0
Borac Banja Luka	2015–16	Bosnian Premier League	21	3	2	0	23	3
Borac Banja Luka	Total		35	3	3	0	38	3
Krupa	2016–17	Bosnian Premier League	29	2	—		29	2
Krupa	2017–18	Bosnian Premier League	6	0	—		6	0
Krupa	2018–19	Bosnian Premier League	14	0	—		14	0
Krupa	2019–20	First League of RS	1	0	—		1	0
Krupa	2020–21	Bosnian Premier League	31	0	—		31	0
Krupa	Total		81	2	—		81	2
Rudar Prijedor	2021–22	Bosnian Premier League	20	0	—		20	0
Krupa	2022–23	First League of RS	34	2	1	1	35	3
Sloga Doboj	2023–24	Bosnian Premier League	28	0	4	1	32	1
Asteras Tripolis	2024–25	Super League Greece	4	0	1	0	5	0
Asteras Tripolis B	2024–25	Super League Greece 2	4	0	—		4	0
Sloga Doboj	2025–26	Bosnian Premier League	16	0	3	0	19	0
Sloga Doboj	2026–27	Bosnian Premier League	8	0	0	0	8	0
Sloga Doboj	Total		24	0	3	0	27	0
Career total			230	7	12	2	242	9

== Honours ==
Krupa

- First League of RS: 2019–20
- Bosnian Cup runner-up: 2017–18
