= Dalibor Kozić =

Bosnia and Herzegovina footballer

Personal information
- Date of birth: 10 February 1988 (age 38)
- Place of birth: Bosanska Gradiška, SFR Yugoslavia
- Height: 1.95 m (6 ft 5 in)
- Position: Goalkeeper

Youth career
- –2011: Kozara Gradiška

Senior career*
Years	Team	Apps	(Gls)
2011–2013	Kozara Gradiška	48	(0)
2013	Borac Banja Luka	0	(0)
2014–2016	Rudar Prijedor	57	(0)
2016–2017	Zrinjski Mostar	17	(0)
2017–2019	GOŠK Gabela	60	(0)
2019–2021	Radnik Bijeljina	26	(0)
- * Club domestic league appearances and goals

Dalibor Kozić (born 10 February 1988) is a retired Bosnian professional footballer who played as a goalkeeper.

He has won the Bosnian Premier League once with Zrinjski Mostar in the 2016–17 season.

== Club career ==
Kozić started off his career at hometown club Kozara Gradiška, where he was called up to the first team in 2011. He stayed at Kozara until 2013, after which he joined Borac Banja Luka, but left the club before the start of the 2013–14 season.

In February 2014, he signed with Rudar Prijedor with whom he won the 2014–15 First League of RS and got promoted to the Bosnian Premier League.

In the summer of 2016, Kozić signed with Zrinjski Mostar. He stayed at Zrinjski for one season and also won the Bosnian Premier League in that season. He left Zrinjski in July 2017.

Only hours after leaving Zrinjski, on 4 July 2017, Kozić signed for newly promoted club GOŠK Gabela. In June 2018, Kozić extended his contract with GOŠK until June 2019. He left GOŠK after the club got relegated to the First League of FBiH on 30 May 2019.

On 13 June 2019, Kozić signed a two-year contract with Radnik Bijeljina. He made his official debut for Radnik on 11 July 2019, in a 2–0 home win against Spartak Trnava in the 2019–20 UEFA Europa League first qualifying round. Kozić made his first league appearance for Radnik on 21 July 2019, in a 2–1 away loss against Sloboda Tuzla.

== Career statistics ==
=== Club ===
As of match played 12 December 2020.

Appearances and goals by club, season and competition
Club	Season	League	League		Cup		Continental		Total	
Club	Season	League	Apps	Goals	Apps	Goals	Apps	Goals	Apps	Goals
Kozara	2011–12	Bosnian Premier League	28	0	—		—		28	0
Kozara	2012–13	First League of RS	20	0	—		—		20	0
Kozara	Total		48	0	—		—		48	0
Borac Banja Luka	2013–14	Bosnian Premier League	—		—		—		—	
Rudar Prijedor	2013–14	First League of RS	7	0	—		—		7	0
Rudar Prijedor	2014–15	First League of RS	21	0	—		—		21	0
Rudar Prijedor	2015–16	Bosnian Premier League	29	0	—		—		29	0
Rudar Prijedor	Total		57	0	—		—		57	0
Zrinjski Mostar	2016–17	Bosnian Premier League	17	0	0	0	2	0	19	0
GOŠK Gabela	2017–18	Bosnian Premier League	31	0	0	0	—		31	0
GOŠK Gabela	2018–19	Bosnian Premier League	29	0	0	0	—		29	0
GOŠK Gabela	Total		60	0	0	0	—		60	0
Radnik Bijeljina	2019–20	Bosnian Premier League	4	0	0	0	2	0	6	0
Radnik Bijeljina	2020–21	Bosnian Premier League	19	0	1	0	—		20	0
Radnik Bijeljina	Total		23	0	1	0	2	0	26	0
Career total			205	0	1	0	4	0	210	0

== Honours ==
Rudar Prijedor

- First League of RS: 2014–15

Zrinjski Mostar'

- Bosnian Premier League: 2016–17
