= Slobodan Milanović =

Bosnian footballer (born 1992)

Personal information
- Date of birth: 27 August 1992 (age 34)
- Place of birth: Dubica, Bosnia and Herzegovina
- Height: 1.83 m (6 ft 0 in)
- Position: Forward

Senior career*
| Years | Team | Apps | (Gls) |
| 2010–2011 | Beograd | | |
| 2011–2013 | Zvijezda Gradačac | 16 | (0) |
| 2012 | → Modriča (loan) | | |
| 2013–2014 | Rudar Prijedor | 23 | (0) |
| 2014–2019 | Krupa | 84 | (8) |
| 2015 | → Waterloo (loan) | 18 | (1) |
| 2019–2021 | Sarajevo | 26 | (1) |
| 2020 | → Olimpik (loan) | 11 | (1) |
| 2021–2023 | Posušje | 44 | (3) |
| 2024– | Marsonia 1909 | 9 | (2) |
- * Club domestic league appearances and goals as of 22 January 2025

Slobodan Milanović (Serbian Cyrillic: Слободан Милановић; born 27 August 1992) is a Bosnian professional footballer who plays as a forward for Marsonia 1909.

== Career ==
Milanović began his career in 2010 in the Serbian League Belgrade with Beograd. In 2011, he played in the Bosnian Premier League with Zvijezda Gradačac, and later on with Rudar Prijedor in 2013. While at Zvijezda, from January to June 2012, Milanović was loaned out to Modriča.

He later played in the First League of RS with Krupa, with whom he gained promotion to the Bosnian Premier League in the 2015–16 season. In 2015, he shortly played abroad in the Canadian Soccer League on loan to Waterloo. After the end of the loan in 2015, Milanović came back to Krupa. In May 2018, with Krupa, he finished as Bosnian Cup runner-up, after losing against Željezničar in the 2017–18 Bosnian cup final.

On 12 June 2019, Milanović after five years left Krupa and signed with Sarajevo on a three-year contract for an undisclosed transfer fee. He made his official debut for Sarajevo on 9 July 2019, in a 3–1 home loss against Celtic in the 2019–20 UEFA Champions League first qualifying round. Milanović made his first league appearance for Sarajevo on 21 July 2019, in a 1–0 home win against Zrinjski Mostar. He scored his first goal for Sarajevo in a 3–0 away league win against Mladost Doboj Kakanj on 29 September 2019.

On 1 June 2020, Milanović won his first league title with Sarajevo, though after the 2019–20 Bosnian Premier League season was ended abruptly due to the COVID-19 pandemic in Bosnia and Herzegovina after which Sarajevo was by default crowned league champions for a second consecutive time. On 3 August 2020, he was sent on a six-month-long loan to Olimpik. Milanović left Sarajevo in June 2021. In October 2021, he remained in the Bosnian top tier by signing with HŠK Posušje. After two seasons with Posušje, his contract expired in the summer of 2023 and was not renewed.

In the winter of 2024, he secured a deal with Marsonia 1909 in the Croatian third-tier league.

== Honours ==
Krupa

- First League of RS: 2015–16
- Bosnian Cup runner-up: 2017–18

Sarajevo

- Bosnian Premier League: 2019–20
- Bosnian Cup: 2020–21
