= 2017–18 Premier League of Bosnia and Herzegovina =

Premijer liga
- Season: 2017–18
- Dates: 22 July 2017 – 20 May 2018
- Champions: Zrinjski; 6th Premier League title 6th Bosnian title
- Relegated: Borac; Vitez
- Champions League: Zrinjski
- Europa League: Željezničar; Sarajevo; Široki Brijeg
- Matches: 108
- Goals: 260 (2.41 per match)
- Top goalscorer: Miloš Filipović (16 goals)

The 2017–18 Premier League of Bosnia and Herzegovina (known as BH Telecom Premier League for sponsorship reasons) was the eighteenth season of the Premier League of Bosnia and Herzegovina, the highest football league of Bosnia and Herzegovina. The season began on 22 July 2017 and concluded on 20 May 2018, with a winter break between early December 2017 and late February 2018.

== Teams ==
A total of 12 teams contested the league, including 10 sides from the 2016–17 season and two promoted from each of the second-level league.

=== Stadiums and locations ===
Borac	Čelik	Gabela	Krupa
Banja Luka City Stadium	Bilino Polje	Perica-Pero Pavlović	Krupa na Vrbasu
Capacity: 10,030	Capacity: 13,812	Capacity: 3,000	Capacity: 3,500
		[[File: |550px]]	
Mladost	Locations of the 2017–18 Premier League of BiH clubs		Radnik
Stadium Mladost Kakanj	Locations of the 2017–18 Premier League of BiH clubs		Gradski Stadium (Bijeljina)
Capacity: 3,000	Locations of the 2017–18 Premier League of BiH clubs		Capacity: 6,000
Sarajevo	Locations of the 2017–18 Premier League of BiH clubs		Sloboda
Asim Ferhatović Hase	Locations of the 2017–18 Premier League of BiH clubs		Tušanj
Capacity: 30,121	Locations of the 2017–18 Premier League of BiH clubs		Capacity: 7,200
Široki Brijeg	Vitez	Zrinjski	Željezničar
Pecara	Gradski Stadium (Vitez)	HŠK Zrinjski Stadium	Grbavica
Capacity: 5,147	Capacity: 3,000	Capacity: 9,000	Capacity: 13,146

=== Personnel and kits ===
Note: Flags indicate national team as has been defined under FIFA eligibility rules. Players and Managers may hold more than one non-FIFA nationality.

Team	Head coach	Captain	Kit manufacturer	Shirt sponsor
Borac	(Bosnia and Herzegovina) Darko Vojvodić	(Bosnia and Herzegovina) Mahir Karić	Diadora	Nova Banka
Čelik	(Bosnia and Herzegovina) Edin Prljača	(Bosnia and Herzegovina) Fenan Salčinović	Givova	Wwin
GOŠK	(Bosnia and Herzegovina) Feđa Dudić	-	no.1	—
Krupa	(Bosnia and Herzegovina) Slobodan Starčević	(Serbia) Aleksandar Vukotić	NAAI	BEMA
Mladost Doboj Kakanj	(Bosnia and Herzegovina) Edis Mulalić	(Bosnia and Herzegovina) Aladin Isaković	Joma	Kakanj Cement
Radnik	(Bosnia and Herzegovina) Mladen Žižović	(Bosnia and Herzegovina) Dino Beširević	Joma	Nektar
Sarajevo	(Bosnia and Herzegovina) Husref Musemić	(North Macedonia) Krste Velkoski	Nike	Turkish Airlines
Sloboda	(Serbia) Slavko Petrović	(Bosnia and Herzegovina) Amer Ordagić	NAAI	Wwin
Široki Brijeg	(Croatia) Goran Sablić	(Bosnia and Herzegovina) Jure Ivanković	Legea	Mepas
Vitez	(Bosnia and Herzegovina) Ivica Bonić	(Bosnia and Herzegovina) Ivan Livaja	Joma	tioil
Zrinjski	(Bosnia and Herzegovina) Blaž Slišković	(Bosnia and Herzegovina) Pero Stojkić	Macron	PPD
Željezničar	(Bosnia and Herzegovina) Admir Adžem	(Bosnia and Herzegovina) Vedran Kjosevski	Diadora	Ziraat Bank

== Regular season ==
The season has a two-stage format. In the regular season, each of the 12 teams play home-and-away once, resulting in 22 games played each. The top six teams in the regular season qualify for the Championship round, the bottom six teams qualify for the Relegation round. Each team then plays home-and-away against the other teams within their own group, for an additional ten games played each, a season total of 32 games.

=== League table ===
Pos	Team	Pld	W	D	L	GF	GA	GD	Pts	Qualification
1	Zrinjski Mostar	22	16	2	4	40	18	+22	50	Qualification for the Championship round
2	Željezničar Sarajevo	22	16	2	4	37	16	+21	50	Qualification for the Championship round
3	Široki Brijeg	22	13	3	6	37	17	+20	42	Qualification for the Championship round
4	Sarajevo	22	12	4	6	44	19	+25	40	Qualification for the Championship round
5	Krupa	22	9	8	5	29	23	+6	35	Qualification for the Championship round
6	Radnik Bijeljina	22	9	5	8	21	24	−3	32	Qualification for the Championship round
7	Mladost Doboj Kakanj	22	7	8	7	29	28	+1	29	Qualification for the Relegation round
8	Borac Banja Luka	22	7	5	10	14	22	−8	26	Qualification for the Relegation round
9	GOŠK Gabela	22	7	3	12	22	30	−8	24	Qualification for the Relegation round
10	Sloboda Tuzla	22	5	6	11	18	25	−7	21	Qualification for the Relegation round
11	Čelik Zenica	22	4	1	17	17	54	−37	13	Qualification for the Relegation round
12	Vitez	22	1	5	16	9	41	−32	8	Qualification for the Relegation round

Source: Football Association of Bosnia and Herzegovina, Soccerway, UEFA
Rules for classification: 1) Points; 2) Goal difference; 3) Goals scored; 4) Head-to-head points; 5) Head-to-head goal difference; 6) Head-to-head away goals (only if two teams); 7) Head-to-head goals scored; 8) Goal difference; 9) Play-off. (Criteria 2 and 3 are not used to decide champion, UEFA competition qualification, or relegation)

=== Results ===
Home \ Away	BOR	ČEL	GAB	KRU	MDK	RAD	SAR	ŠB	SLO	VIT	ŽEL	ZRI
Borac Banja Luka	—	2–0	1–0	0–1	0–1	1–0	1–1	2–1	1–0	1–0	0–1	1–1
Čelik Zenica	1–0	—	2–0	0–2	0–3	3–0	0–2	1–4	2–2	1–0	0–3	1–3
GOŠK Gabela	0–1	3–2	—	0–1	2–2	0–1	0–2	2–1	2–0	2–0	0–1	0–2
Krupa	2–0	1–0	1–1	—	3–1	1–1	1–2	1–2	0–0	3–0	2–4	1–0
Mladost Doboj Kakanj	2–1	4–0	1–1	1–1	—	3–0	1–1	0–0	1–1	1–0	2–1	1–2
Radnik Bijeljina	3–0	3–1	3–1	0–0	0–0	—	1–4	1–0	1–0	2–0	0–2	2–1
Sarajevo	3–0	5–0	0–1	2–3	4–2	0–0	—	2–0	0–0	4–0	0–1	1–2
Široki Brijeg	2–0	4–0	3–0	1–1	3–1	1–0	2–1	—	2–0	1–0	1–2	2–1
Sloboda Tuzla	1–1	3–0	0–1	2–2	2–0	0–1	1–3	0–3	—	4–0	1–0	0–2
Vitez	0–0	2–0	0–3	1–1	2–2	0–0	0–3	1–4	0–1	—	1–1	2–3
Željezničar Sarajevo	2–1	3–1	3–1	4–1	2–0	3–2	2–1	0–0	1–0	1–0	—	0–1
Zrinjski Mostar	0–0	5–2	3–2	1–0	2–0	3–0	1–3	1–0	2–0	3–0	1–0	—

Source: Football Association of Bosnia and Herzegovina
Legend: Blue = home team win; Yellow = draw; Red = away team win.
For upcoming matches, an "a" indicates there is an article about the rivalry between the two participants.

== Championship round ==
=== Table ===
Pos	Team	Pld	W	D	L	GF	GA	GD	Pts	Qualification
1	Zrinjski Mostar (C)	32	21	6	5	58	30	+28	69	Qualification for the Champions League first qualifying round
2	Željezničar Sarajevo	32	19	6	7	49	30	+19	63	Qualification for the Europa League first qualifying round
3	Sarajevo	32	17	5	10	58	28	+30	56	Qualification for the Europa League first qualifying round
4	Široki Brijeg	32	16	8	8	52	28	+24	56	Qualification for the Europa League first qualifying round
5	Radnik Bijeljina	32	12	9	11	35	38	−3	45	
6	Krupa	32	10	10	12	35	42	−7	40	

Source: Football Association of Bosnia and Herzegovina, UEFA, Soccerway
Rules for classification: 1) Points; 2) Goal difference; 3) Goals scored; 4) Head-to-head points; 5) Head-to-head goal difference; 6) Head-to-head away goals (only if two teams); 7) Head-to-head goals scored; 8) Goal difference; 9) Play-off. (Criteria 2 and 3 are not used to decide champion, UEFA competition qualification, or relegation)
(C) Champions

=== Results ===
Home \ Away	KRU	RAD	SAR	SB	ZRI	ŽEL
Krupa	—	1–3	2–3	0–0	0–1	2–0
Radnik Bijeljina	1–1	—	1–0	3–3	1–2	1–0
Sarajevo	1–0	3–1	—	2–0	4–1	0–0
Široki Brijeg	5–0	1–1	1–0	—	0–0	3–1
Zrinjski Mostar	4–0	1–1	1–0	3–1	—	3–3
Željezničar Sarajevo	1–0	2–1	2–1	1–1	2–2	—

Source: Football Association of Bosnia and Herzegovina
Legend: Blue = home team win; Yellow = draw; Red = away team win.
For upcoming matches, an "a" indicates there is an article about the rivalry between the two participants.

== Relegation round ==
=== Table ===
Pos	Team	Pld	W	D	L	GF	GA	GD	Pts	Relegation
7	GOŠK Gabela	32	13	6	13	32	36	−4	45	
8	Mladost Doboj Kakanj	32	11	9	12	42	44	−2	42	
9	Borac Banja Luka (R)	32	10	8	14	22	31	−9	38	Relegation to the Prva Liga RS
10	Sloboda Tuzla	32	9	9	14	31	34	−3	36	
11	Čelik Zenica	32	8	4	20	30	61	−31	28	
12	Vitez (R)	32	3	6	23	15	57	−42	15	Relegation to the Prva Liga FBiH

Source: Football Association of Bosnia and Herzegovina, UEFA, Soccerway
Rules for classification: 1) Points; 2) Goal difference; 3) Goals scored; 4) Head-to-head points; 5) Head-to-head goal difference; 6) Head-to-head away goals (only if two teams); 7) Head-to-head goals scored; 8) Goal difference; 9) Play-off. (Criteria 2 and 3 are not used to decide champion, UEFA competition qualification, or relegation)
(R) Relegated

=== Results ===
Home \ Away	BOR	ČEL	GAB	MDK	SLO	VIT
Borac Banja Luka	—	0–0	0–0	4–2	2–0	1–0
Čelik Zenica	1–1	—	2–0	2–1	0–2	0–1
GOŠK Gabela	1–0	1–0	—	1–0	0–0	1–1
Mladost Doboj Kakanj	2–0	0–3	1–2	—	1–1	1–0
Sloboda Tuzla	1–0	1–1	1–2	2–3	—	2–0
Vitez	2–0	0–4	1–2	1–2	0–3	—

Source: Football Association of Bosnia and Herzegovina
Legend: Blue = home team win; Yellow = draw; Red = away team win.
For upcoming matches, an "a" indicates there is an article about the rivalry between the two participants.

== Licensing issues ==
All clubs in Bosnia and Herzegovina must have a license to compete in the Premier League of Bosnia and Herzegovina with the deadline this season being set May 7 for the First Degree commission. Five clubs did not get their licences for the first degree: Borac Banja Luka, Sloboda Tuzla, Čelik Zenica, Vitez and GOŠK Gabela. The Second Degree commission convened on May 24 and only approved Čelik before being abruptly cancelled and rescheduled for May 30. The commission approved all other clubs except for Borac, meaning that they would be relegated into the First League of the Republika Srpska. As Borac did not have the license but Čelik did, they were allowed to stay in the Premier League.

Borac attempted to solve the issues which caused the license removal, including removing the debt Borac owed to FK Džaja. Borac showed the evidence it showed regarding the payments to Džaja to UEFA, which will assist the Football Association of Bosnia and Herzegovina regarding the decision of whether or not Borac Banja Luka or Čelik Zenica will compete in the 2018–19 Premier League of Bosnia and Herzegovina. The debate over the licences also caused the draws for the next season to be rescheduled.

In a similar way, teams promoted from the First League of the Republika Srpska or First League of the Federation of Bosnia and Herzegovina also need to get a license separated into First and Second Degree commissions, although their deadlines are moved to a later date. The winners of both leagues FK Sloga Simin Han (later known as Tuzla City) and FK Zvijezda 09 met with the First Degree commission on June 14, but only Sloga received their license. Zvijezda 09 will convene at a later date with the Second Degree commission.

== Top goalscorers ==
Rank	Player	Club	Goals
1	(Serbia) Miloš Filipović	Zrinjski	16
2	(Bosnia and Herzegovina) Mersudin Ahmetović	Sarajevo	14
3	(Bosnia and Herzegovina) Nemanja Bilbija	Zrinjski	12
3	(Bosnia and Herzegovina) Petar Kunić	Borac	12
3	(Bosnia and Herzegovina) Luka Menalo	Široki Brijeg	12
3	(North Macedonia) Krste Velkoski	Sarajevo	12
3	(Bosnia and Herzegovina) Goran Zakarić	Željezničar	12
8	(Croatia) Dražen Bagarić	Široki Brijeg	7
8	(Bosnia and Herzegovina) Haris Dilaver	Mladost Doboj Kakanj	7
8	(Bosnia and Herzegovina) Nusmir Fajić	Krupa	7
8	(Bosnia and Herzegovina) Haris Handžić	Zrinjski	7
8	(Bosnia and Herzegovina) Nardin Mulahusejnović	GOŠK Gabela	7
8	(Bosnia and Herzegovina) Stevo Nikolić	Čelik	7
8	(Serbia) Vojo Ubiparip	Željezničar	7

== Attendances ==
#	Club	Average
1	Željezničar	4,825
2	Sarajevo	3,156
3	Zrinjski	2,738
4	Borac	2,581
5	Čelik	2,369
6	Široki	1,526
7	Sloboda	1,450
8	Krupa	822
9	GOŠK	616
10	Mladost	575
11	Radnik	456
12	Vitez	406
