= Slobodan Starčević =

Bosnian football manager (born 1971)

Personal information
- Date of birth: 14 August 1971 (age 55)
- Place of birth: Banja Luka, SFR Yugoslavia

Team information
- Current team: Laktaši (manager)

Managerial career
- Years: Team
- 2012–2013: Borac Banja Luka
- 2013: Rudar Prijedor
- 2014–2018: Krupa
- 2018–2019: Tuzla City
- 2019: Krupa
- 2019–2020: Radnik Bijeljina
- 2020–2022: Bosnia and Herzegovina U21
- 2023–2024: Borac Kozarska Dubica
- 2024–: Laktaši

Slobodan Starčević (born 14 August 1971) is a Bosnian professional football manager who is the manager of First League of RS club Laktaši.

== Managerial career ==
=== Early career ===
Starčević started his managerial career in 2010 when he became an assistant manager at Borac Banja Luka. After two years, in 2012, Starčević was named the new manager of Borac. He left the club in May 2013.

After leaving Borac, on 11 June 2013, he became the new manager of Rudar Prijedor. In September 2013, Starčević was sacked after drawing 4 and losing 3 out of 7 matches with Rudar.

=== Krupa ===
On 24 January 2014, Starčević became the new manager of Krupa. In May 2014, he won the Second League of RS (Group West) with Krupa, promoting the club to the First League of RS.

In May 2016, Starčević won the club's first ever and historic First League of RS in the 2015–16 season and promoted the club to the Bosnian Premier League.

Starčević once again made Krupa history by leading the club to the 2017–18 Bosnian Cup final in which the club lost to Željezničar in both matches (2–0 at Sarajevo and 2–4 at Krupa na Vrbasu), thus finishing as cup runners-up.

On 31 May 2018, after almost four and a half years as the club's manager and making the best results in the club's history so far, he left Krupa.

=== Tuzla City ===
On 12 June 2018, two weeks after leaving Krupa, Starčević became the new manager of newly promoted Bosnian Premier League club Tuzla City, at that time still known as Sloga Simin Han.

His first official win as Tuzla City's manager came on 4 August 2018, in a 0–1 away win against Mladost Doboj Kakanj.

On 23 February 2019, 8 months after being appointed as the club's manager, Starčević left Tuzla City after not making the best results, which culminated with a 0–3 home loss against Sarajevo on the 20. matchday of the 2018–19 Bosnian Premier League season.

=== Return to Krupa ===
On 12 March 2019, Starčević came back to the club he had great success with, Krupa. Almost 10 months after leaving the club, he came back with a goal, if possible, to save Krupa from relegation from the Bosnian Premier League, where the club was currently last placed in the 2018–19 season.

In his first game back, Krupa made a good result by drawing 0–0 against Sarajevo on 17 March 2019.

His first win came on 13 April 2019, a 5–2 home win against Čelik Zenica. Even though Krupa made good results with Starčević as the manager and won a reasonable 17 points in 11 league games, it still wasn't enough to escape relegation, as the club finished on 11th place, only 3 points off of safe and 10th placed Tuzla City, the club Starčević managed right before being appointed as the Krupa manager.

He left Krupa for a second time in June 2019, after his contract with the club expired.

=== Radnik Bijeljina ===
On 11 November 2019, Starčević was named the new manager of Radnik Bijeljina, replacing Mladen Žižović who was at that position for over two years. In his first game as Radnik manager, Starčević's team beat Mladost Doboj Kakanj in a 0–4 away, league match win on 23 November 2019. His first loss with Radnik came on 1 December 2019, a 0–1 home league loss against Velež Mostar.

=== Bosnia and Herzegovina U21 ===
On 6 March 2020, it was announced that Starčević had taken over the role of the Bosnia and Herzegovina U21 national team head coach. In his first game as head coach, the team defeated Wales in a 2021 UEFA European Under-21 Championship qualification match on 4 September 2020.

== Managerial statistics ==
As of match played 31 May 2026

Managerial record by team and tenure
Team	From	To	Record				
Team	From	To	G	W	D	L	Win %
Borac Banja Luka	18 July 2012	20 May 2013	30	13	9	8	43.33
Rudar Prijedor	11 June 2013	16 September 2013	7	0	4	3	0.00
Krupa	24 January 2014	31 May 2018	82	31	23	28	37.80
Tuzla City	12 June 2018	25 February 2019	21	5	5	11	23.81
Krupa	13 March 2019	17 June 2019	11	5	2	4	45.45
Radnik Bijeljina	11 November 2019	13 January 2020	3	1	0	2	33.33
Bosnia and Herzegovina U21	6 March 2020	13 June 2022	19	8	3	8	42.11
Borac Kozarska Dubica	30 October 2023	19 August 2024	23	11	4	8	47.83
Laktaši	20 August 2024	Present	66	45	11	10	68.18
Total			262	119	61	82	45.42

== Honours ==
Krupa

- First League of RS: 2015–16
- Second League of RS: 2013–14 (West)
- Bosnian Cup runner-up: 2017–18

Laktaši

- First League of RS: 2024–25
