= 2014–15 First League of the Republika Srpska =

First League of the Republika Srpska
- Season: 2014–15
- Champions: Rudar Prijedor; 2nd First League title
- Promoted: Rudar Prijedor
- Relegated: Proleter Teslić; Podrinje; Mladost Gacko; Napredak (DŠ)
- Matches: 182
- Goals: 428 (2.35 per match)
- Top goalscorer: Neđo Šuka; Ivan Ninić (11 goals)

The 2014–15 First League of the Republika Srpska was the twentieth season of the First League of the Republika Srpska, the second tier football league of Bosnia and Herzegovina, since its original establishment and the thirteenth as a second tier league. It will begin on 18 August 2014 and end on 6 June 2015; a winter break where no matches are played will be in effect between 8 November 2014 and 13 March 2015. FK Drina Zvornik were the last champions, having won their one championship title in the 2013–14 season and earning a promotion to Premier League of Bosnia and Herzegovina.

Fourteen clubs are participating in this session, ten returning from the previous session, one relegated from Premier League of Bosnia and Herzegovina, two promoted from two regional Second League of the Republika Srpska.

== Changes from last season ==
=== Team changes ===
==== From First League of the RS ====
Promoted to Premier League

- Drina Zvornik

Relegated to two of 3 respective regional Second League of the RS

- Rudar Ugljevik (Second League of the RS – East)
- Modriča Maxima (Second League of the RS – West)
- Sloga Doboj (Second League of the RS – West)

==== To First League of RS ====
Relegated from Premier League

- Rudar Prijedor
- Leotar

Promoted from two regional Second League of the RS

- Vlasenica (Second League of the RS – East)
- Krupa (Second League of the RS - West)
- Tekstilac (Second League of the RS - West)

=== Stadions and locations ===
Location of clubs in 2014–15 Prva liga Republike Srpske

Team	Location	Stadium	Capacity
Vlasenica	Vlasenica	Gradski Stadion, Vlasenica	1,000
Drina HE	Višegrad	Gradski Stadion, Višegrad	1,500
Krupa	Krupa na Vrbasu	Gradski Stadion, Krupa na Vrbasu	1,000
Kozara	Gradiška	Gradski Stadion, Gradiška	5,000
Leotar	Trebinje	Police Stadium	8,550
Mladost (G)	Gacko	Gradski Stadion, Gacko	3,500
Napredak (DŠ)	Donji Šepak	Gradski stadion Donji Šepak	1,000
Podrinje	Janja	Podrinje Stadium	3,000
Proleter	Teslić	Radolinka Stadium	5,000
Rudar Prijedor	Prijedor	Gradski Stadion, Prijedor	5,000
Sloboda (MG)	Mrkonjić Grad	Gradski Stadion Luke, Mrkonjić Grad	2,000
Sloboda (NG)	Bosanski Novi	Mlakve Stadium	4,000
Tekstilac	Derventa	Luke Stadium, Derventa	1,000
Sutjeska	Foča	Gradski Stadion, Foča	4,000

== League table ==
Pos	Team	Pld	W	D	L	GF	GA	GD	Pts	Promotion or relegation
1	Rudar Prijedor (Note: Rudar Prijedor, Leotar, Proleter Teslić and Podrinje were deducted six points due to the match-fixing their matches in the last round.) (C, P)	25	15	5	5	31	13	+18	44	Promotion to Premijer Liga BIH
2	Krupa	26	12	7	7	34	25	+9	43	
3	Leotar	25	15	3	7	29	21	+8	42	
4	Kozara	26	12	5	9	44	31	+13	41	
5	Tekstilac Derventa	26	11	8	7	23	18	+5	41	
6	Sutjeska Foča	26	11	6	9	30	29	+1	39	
7	Sloboda Novi Grad	26	11	4	11	36	40	−4	37	
8	Vlasenica	26	10	6	10	30	32	−2	36	
9	Sloboda Mrkonjić Grad	26	10	3	13	28	34	−6	33	
10	Drina Višegrad (Note: Drina HE Višegrad were deducted one point.)	26	8	6	12	29	37	−8	29	
11	Proleter Teslić (R)	25	9	4	12	32	35	−3	25	Relegation to Second League RS
12	Podrinje (R)	25	7	9	9	21	20	+1	24	Relegation to Second League RS
13	Mladost Gacko (R)	26	7	3	16	28	47	−19	24	Relegation to Second League RS
14	Napredak Donji Šepak (R)	26	5	5	16	31	44	−13	20	Relegation to Second League RS

Source: FSRS (in Bosnian)
Rules for classification: 1st points; 2nd goal difference; 3rd goals scored
For deciding champions, qualification to higher rank and relegation: 1st points; 2nd head-to-head points; 3rd head-to-head goal difference; 4th head-to-head goals scored; 5th head-to-head away goals scored; 6th goal difference; 7th goals scored
(C) Champions; (P) Promoted; (R) Relegated

== Season statistics ==
=== Top goalscorers ===
Rank	Player	Club	Goals
1	(Bosnia and Herzegovina) Neđo Šuka	Drina HE	11
1	(Bosnia and Herzegovina) Ivan Ninić	Napredak (DŠ)	11
3	(Bosnia and Herzegovina) Siniša Radoja	Rudar Prijedor	10
4	(Bosnia and Herzegovina) Ljuban Antonić	Sloboda (NG)	9
5	(Bosnia and Herzegovina) Rajko Ćeranić	Mladost Gacko	8
5	(Bosnia and Herzegovina) Vedran Kantar	Rudar Prijedor	8
5	(Bosnia and Herzegovina) Arnes Brkić	Sloboda (NG)	8
5	(Bosnia and Herzegovina) Dejan Drakul	Sutjeska	8
5	(Bosnia and Herzegovina) Nemanja Asanović	Tekstilac	8

== See also ==
- 2014–15 Premier League of Bosnia and Herzegovina
- 2014–15 First League of the Federation of Bosnia and Herzegovina
- 2014–15 Bosnia and Herzegovina Football Cup
