= 2018–19 Premier League of Bosnia and Herzegovina =

Premijer liga
- Season: 2018–19
- Dates: 21 July 2018 – 25 May 2019
- Champions: Sarajevo; 3rd Premier League title 4th Bosnian title 6th Domestic title
- Relegated: Krupa; GOŠK
- Champions League: Sarajevo
- Europa League: Zrinjski; Široki Brijeg; Radnik
- Matches: 198
- Goals: 432 (2.18 per match)
- Top goalscorer: Sulejman Krpić (16 goals)
- Biggest home win: Široki Brijeg 6–0 Čelik (5 August 2018)
- Biggest away win: Mladost Doboj Kakanj 0–6 Sarajevo (6 October 2018)
- Highest scoring: Krupa 5–2 Čelik (13 April 2019)
- Longest winning run: 6 matches Sarajevo
- Longest unbeaten run: 14 matches Sarajevo
- Longest winless run: 12 matches Zvijezda 09
- Longest losing run: 7 matches GOŠK
- Highest attendance: 15,500; Sarajevo 4–0 Zvijezda 09 (18 May 2019)
- Lowest attendance: 100; Zvijezda 09 2–1 GOŠK (11 May 2019)
- Total attendance: 344,167
- Average attendance: 1,738

The 2018–19 Premier League of Bosnia and Herzegovina (known as BH Telecom Premier League for sponsorship reasons) was the nineteenth season of the Premier League of Bosnia and Herzegovina, the highest football league of Bosnia and Herzegovina. The season began on 21 July 2018 and concluded on 25 May 2019, with a winter break between early December 2018 and late February 2019.

== Teams ==
A total of 12 teams contested in the league, including 10 sides from the 2017–18 season and two promoted from each of the second-level league.

=== Stadiums and locations ===
Čelik	GOŠK	Krupa	Mladost
Bilino Polje	Perica-Pero Pavlović	Krupa na Vrbasu	MGM Farm Arena
Capacity: 13,812	Capacity: 3,000	Capacity: 3,500	Capacity: 3,000
	[[File: |550px]]		
Radnik	Locations of the 2018–19 Premier League of BiH clubs		Sarajevo
Gradski Stadion Bijeljina	Locations of the 2018–19 Premier League of BiH clubs		Asim Ferhatović Hase
Capacity: 6,000	Locations of the 2018–19 Premier League of BiH clubs		Capacity: 30,121
Sloboda	Locations of the 2018–19 Premier League of BiH clubs		Široki Brijeg
Tušanj	Locations of the 2018–19 Premier League of BiH clubs		Pecara
Capacity: 7,200	Locations of the 2018–19 Premier League of BiH clubs		Capacity: 5,147
Tuzla City	Zrinjski	Zvijezda 09	Željezničar
Tušanj	Stadion pod Bijelim Brijegom	Ugljevik City Stadium	Grbavica
Capacity: 7,200	Capacity: 9,000	Capacity: 5,000	Capacity: 13,146

=== Personnel and kits ===
Note: Flags indicate national team as has been defined under FIFA eligibility rules. Players and Managers may hold more than one non-FIFA nationality.

Team	Head coach	Captain	Kit manufacturer	Shirt sponsor
Čelik	(Turkey) Cihat Arslan	(Bosnia and Herzegovina) Fenan Salčinović	Hummel	WWin
GOŠK	(Croatia) Stanko Mršić	(Bosnia and Herzegovina) Dalibor Kozić	No1	Cemex
Krupa	(Bosnia and Herzegovina) Slobodan Starčević	(Bosnia and Herzegovina) Slobodan Milanović	No1	EKO-EURO TIM
Mladost Doboj Kakanj	(Bosnia and Herzegovina) Elvedin Beganović (caretaker)	(Bosnia and Herzegovina) Aladin Isaković	Joma	HeidelbergCement
Radnik	(Bosnia and Herzegovina) Mladen Žižović	(Bosnia and Herzegovina) Velibor Đurić	Joma	—
Sarajevo	(Bosnia and Herzegovina) Husref Musemić	(North Macedonia) Krste Velkoski	Nike	Turkish Airlines
Sloboda	(Bosnia and Herzegovina) Zlatan Nalić	(Bosnia and Herzegovina) Perica Ivetić	NAAI	WWin
Široki Brijeg	(North Macedonia) Goce Sedloski	(Bosnia and Herzegovina) Josip Barišić	Legea	FEAL
Tuzla City	(Bosnia and Herzegovina) Mirza Varešanović	(Serbia) Ivan Kostić	No1	—
Zrinjski	(Bosnia and Herzegovina) Blaž Slišković	(Bosnia and Herzegovina) Pero Stojkić	Macron	PPD
Zvijezda 09	(Bosnia and Herzegovina) Milenko Bošnjaković	(Serbia) Filip Erić	Hummel	—
Željezničar	(Bosnia and Herzegovina) Amar Osim	(Bosnia and Herzegovina) Sulejman Krpić	Umbro	—

== League table ==
Pos	Team	Pld	W	D	L	GF	GA	GD	Pts	Qualification or relegation
1	Sarajevo (C)	33	21	7	5	68	20	+48	70	Qualification for the Champions League first qualifying round
2	Zrinjski Mostar	33	19	8	6	46	22	+24	65	Qualification for the Europa League first qualifying round (Note: Since the winners of the 2018–19 Bosnian Cup, Sarajevo, qualified for European competition based on league position, the spot awarded to the cup winners (Europa League first qualifying round) was passed to the fourth-placed team.)
3	Široki Brijeg	33	13	15	5	40	23	+17	54	Qualification for the Europa League first qualifying round
4	Željezničar	33	14	8	11	43	32	+11	50	Ineligible for 2019–20 European competitions (Note: As 4th placed Željezničar failed to get the UEFA license for the competition due to financial problems, Radnik Bijeljina was awarded the place as the next best placed team (5th place).)
5	Radnik Bijeljina	33	10	14	9	29	25	+4	44	Qualification for the Europa League first qualifying round
6	Mladost Doboj Kakanj	33	12	7	14	36	45	−9	43	
7	Čelik Zenica	33	11	10	12	30	49	−19	43	
8	Sloboda Tuzla	33	10	8	15	22	31	−9	38	
9	Zvijezda 09	33	9	11	13	33	45	−12	38	
10	Tuzla City	33	9	9	15	32	44	−12	36	
11	Krupa (R)	33	8	9	16	40	48	−8	33	Relegation to the Prva Liga RS
12	GOŠK Gabela (R)	33	5	8	20	23	54	−31	23	Relegation to the Prva Liga FBiH

Source: Football Association of Bosnia and Herzegovina, Soccerway, UEFA
Rules for classification: 1) Points; 2) Goal difference; 3) Goals scored; 4) Head-to-head points; 5) Head-to-head goal difference; 6) Head-to-head away goals (only if two teams); 7) Head-to-head goals scored; 8) Goal difference; 9) Play-off. (Criteria 2 and 3 are not used to decide champion, UEFA competition qualification, or relegation)
(C) Champions; (R) Relegated

=== Positions by table ===
The table lists the positions of teams after each week of matches. In order to preserve chronological evolvements, any postponed matches are not included to the round at which they were originally scheduled, but added to the full round they were played immediately afterwards.

Team ╲ Round	1	2	3	4	5	6	7	8	9	10	11	12	13	14	15	16	17	18	19	20	21	22	23	24	25	26	27	28	29	30	31	32	33
Čelik Zenica	12	7	9	7	6	5	5	6	7	7	7	6	7	7	8	7	8	8	9	8	8	8	6	5	5	6	7	7	6	6	6	5	7
GOŠK Gabela	10	12	11	11	9	9	9	10	11	11	11	11	11	12	11	11	11	11	11	11	11	11	11	11	11	11	11	12	12	12	12	12	12
Krupa	1	2	5	4	7	6	6	8	8	8	8	10	10	9	12	12	12	12	12	12	12	12	12	12	12	12	12	11	11	11	11	11	11
Mladost Doboj Kakanj	6	11	12	11	12	12	12	11	9	9	10	8	8	8	7	8	5	5	6	4	6	6	8	8	8	8	8	8	9	9	9	7	6
Radnik Bijeljina	2	4	6	5	4	4	7	5	6	6	6	7	6	5	5	6	7	7	7	7	7	7	5	6	6	5	6	5	5	5	5	6	5
Sarajevo	8	5	2	3	3	3	1	2	2	1	1	1	1	1	1	1	1	1	1	1	1	1	1	1	1	1	1	1	1	1	1	1	1
Sloboda Tuzla	9	9	10	9	5	7	4	7	5	5	4	5	5	6	6	5	6	6	5	6	5	5	7	7	7	7	5	6	7	7	7	8	8
Široki Brijeg	4	3	1	2	1	2	3	4	4	4	5	4	4	4	4	4	4	4	3	3	3	4	4	4	3	3	3	3	3	3	3	3	3
Tuzla City	11	10	7	8	10	10	10	9	10	10	9	9	9	10	10	10	10	10	10	10	10	9	9	9	9	9	9	10	10	10	10	10	10
Zrinjski	3	1	4	6	8	8	8	3	3	3	3	2	2	3	2	2	2	2	2	2	2	2	2	2	2	2	2	2	2	2	2	2	2
Zvijezda 09	7	8	8	10	11	11	11	12	12	12	12	12	12	11	9	9	9	9	8	9	9	10	10	10	10	10	10	9	8	8	8	9	9
Željezničar	5	6	3	1	2	1	2	1	1	2	2	3	3	2	3	3	3	3	4	5	4	3	3	3	4	4	4	4	4	4	4	4	4

Leader
UEFA Europa League First qualifying round
Relegation to First League of FBiH/First League of RS

Updated to match(es) played on 18 May 2019. Source: BH Telecom Premier League BiH, 2018/19 Premier League BiH

== Results ==
=== Rounds 1–22 ===
Home \ Away	ČEL	GAB	KRU	MDK	RAD	SAR	ŠB	SLO	TUZ	Z09	ZRI	ŽEL
Čelik Zenica	—	3–1	3–1	0–3	1–0	0–0	1–1	2–1	1–1	2–0	1–0	1–0
GOŠK Gabela	0–0	—	1–0	1–3	1–1	1–0	0–0	0–0	3–2	2–2	0–4	0–1
Krupa	3–1	3–0	—	2–2	0–0	1–4	2–2	0–1	0–2	1–1	1–2	2–1
Mladost Doboj Kakanj	1–1	1–0	2–1	—	2–0	0–6	0–1	1–0	0–1	0–0	0–0	2–2
Radnik Bijeljina	0–0	1–0	2–2	3–1	—	2–1	2–1	0–1	3–1	1–0	0–1	1–0
Sarajevo	3–1	1–1	2–1	4–0	2–1	—	1–0	1–0	3–0	3–1	4–2	2–1
Široki Brijeg	6–0	1–1	2–0	1–1	0–0	0–3	—	0–0	1–0	2–0	1–1	0–3
Sloboda Tuzla	1–0	2–0	1–0	2–1	2–0	0–1	0–1	—	1–1	0–3	0–1	0–0
Tuzla City	1–1	2–1	2–1	0–1	0–0	0–3	0–0	0–1	—	3–1	1–2	0–2
Zvijezda 09	2–0	1–0	0–0	0–2	0–0	0–4	1–1	1–1	1–1	—	1–0	1–3
Zrinjski Mostar	3–0	3–1	1–0	1–0	0–0	2–2	0–0	2–0	1–0	5–2	—	0–1
Željezničar	3–2	1–2	1–1	2–1	1–0	2–2	2–3	0–0	2–3	0–1	2–0	—

Source: Football Association of Bosnia and Herzegovina
Legend: Blue = home team win; Yellow = draw; Red = away team win.
For upcoming matches, an "a" indicates there is an article about the rivalry between the two participants.

=== Rounds 23–33 ===
Home \ Away	ČEL	GAB	KRU	MDK	RAD	SAR	ŠB	SLO	TUZ	Z09	ZRI	ŽEL
Čelik Zenica	—	1–0		1–0			1–1	1–0	1–1		0–1	
GOŠK Gabela		—			1–2	0–2		3–2	0–3			1–1
Krupa	5–2	4–0	—		2–2				1–0	2–0		
Mladost Doboj Kakanj		3–1	3–1	—	0–3		1–0		0–2		2–2	
Radnik Bijeljina	0–0				—	0–0		1–0		1–1		0–1
Sarajevo	5–0		0–0	2–0		—	0–0			4–0	0–1	
Široki Brijeg		1–0	2–1		2–1		—	4–0	1–0		1–0	
Sloboda Tuzla			1–2	0–1		2–1		—		2–1		0–0
Tuzla City					1–1	1–0		1–1	—	1–3		0–3
Zvijezda 09	4–0	1–1		2–1			1–1			—	0–0	
Zrinjski Mostar		1–0	2–0		1–1			1–0	5–1		—	1–0
Željezničar	1–2		3–0	3–1		0–3	0–0			1–0		—

Source: Football Association of Bosnia and Herzegovina
Legend: Blue = home team win; Yellow = draw; Red = away team win.
For upcoming matches, an "a" indicates there is an article about the rivalry between the two participants.

== Top goalscorers ==
Rank	Player	Club	Goals
1	(Bosnia and Herzegovina) Sulejman Krpić	Željezničar	16
2	(Bosnia and Herzegovina) Nemanja Bilbija	Zrinjski	14
2	(Bosnia and Herzegovina) Mersudin Ahmetović	Sarajevo	14
4	(Bosnia and Herzegovina) Benjamin Tatar	Sarajevo	12
4	(Serbia) Vojo Ubiparip	Tuzla City	12
6	(North Macedonia) Krste Velkoski	Sarajevo	11
7	(Bosnia and Herzegovina) Haris Dilaver	Čelik	10
7	(Bosnia and Herzegovina) Irfan Hadžić	Radnik Bijeljina	10

== Attendances ==
#	Club	Average
1	Sarajevo	4,294
2	Željezničar	3,962
3	Čelik	2,875
4	Sloboda	2,544
5	Zrinjski	1,841
6	Tuzla	1,622
7	Široki	1,359
8	Mladost	647
9	Radnik	606
10	Krupa	488
11	GOŠK	431
12	Zvijezda	367
