= Redžić =

Redžić is a surname. People with the surname include:

- Beni Redžić, an American soccer player
- Sanela Redžić, a Bosnian disabled athlete
- Husref Redžić, a Bosnian architect
- Enver Redžić, a Bosnian historian
- Ajdin Redžić, a Bosnian footballer
- Zoran Redžić, a Bosnian musician

== See also ==
- Damir Redzic
