= 2016–17 Premier League of Bosnia and Herzegovina =

Premijer liga
- Season: 2016–17
- Dates: 23 July 2016 – 28 May 2017
- Champions: Zrinjski; 5th Premier League title 5th Bosnian title
- Relegated: Metalleghe-BSI; Olimpic
- Champions League: Zrinjski
- Europa League: Željezničar; Sarajevo; Široki Brijeg
- Matches: 174
- Goals: 383 (2.2 per match)
- Top goalscorer: Ivan Lendrić (19 goals)
- Biggest home win: Zrinjski 4–0 Čelik (10 September 2016); Sarajevo 4–0 Čelik (30 October 2016)
- Biggest away win: Olimpik 0–5 Zrinjski (29 October 2016)
- Highest scoring: Sarajevo 4–3 Mladost (DK) (20 November 2016)

The 2016–17 Premier League of Bosnia and Herzegovina (known as BH Telecom Premier League for sponsorship reasons) was the seventeenth season of the Premier League of Bosnia and Herzegovina, the highest football league of Bosnia and Herzegovina. The season began on 23 July 2016 and concluded on 28 May 2017, with a winter break between early December 2016 and late February 2017. The official fixture schedule was released on 24 June 2016.

== Teams ==
A total of 12 teams contested the league, including 10 sides from the 2015–16 season and two promoted from each of the second-level league.

=== Stadiums and locations ===
Location of the 2016–17 Premier League of BiH clubs

| Team | Location | Stadium | Capacity |
|---|---|---|---|
| Čelik | Zenica | Bilino Polje | 13,812 |
| Krupa | Krupa na Vrbasu | Gradski Stadion (Krupa na Vrbasu) | 1,200 |
| Metalleghe-BSI | Jajce | Stadion Mračaj | 3,000 |
| Mladost | Doboj (Kakanj) | Stadion Mladost Kakanj | 3,000 |
| Olimpik | Sarajevo | Otoka | 3,000 |
| Radnik | Bijeljina | Gradski stadion (Bijeljina) | 6,000 |
| Sarajevo | Sarajevo | Asim Ferhatović Hase | 30,121 |
| Sloboda | Tuzla | Tušanj | 7,200 |
| Široki Brijeg | Široki Brijeg | Pecara | 5,147 |
| Vitez | Vitez | Gradski Stadion (Vitez) | 3,000 |
| Zrinjski | Mostar | Bijeli Brijeg | 9,000 |
| Željezničar | Sarajevo | Grbavica | 13,146 |

=== Personnel and kits ===
Note: Flags indicate national team as has been defined under FIFA eligibility rules. Players and Managers may hold more than one non-FIFA nationality.

Personnel and kits
| Team | Head coach | Captain | Kit manufacturer | shirt sponsor |
|---|---|---|---|---|
| NK Čelik Zenica | (Croatia) Boris Pavić | (Bosnia and Herzegovina) Emir Jusić | Haad | Grad Zenica |
| NK Metalleghe-BSI | (Croatia) Mato Neretljak | (Bosnia and Herzegovina) Nevres Fejzić | Joma | — |
| FK Krupa | (Bosnia and Herzegovina) Slobodan Starčević | (Serbia) Aleksandar Vukotić | NAAI | BEMA |
| FK Mladost Doboj Kakanj | (Bosnia and Herzegovina) Husref Musemić | (Bosnia and Herzegovina) Aladin Isaković | Joma | Kakanj Cement |
| FK Olimpik Sarajevo | (Bosnia and Herzegovina) Dragan Radović | (Bosnia and Herzegovina) Mahir Karić | Puma | Europlakat |
| FK Radnik Bijeljina | (Serbia) Nebojša Milošević | (Serbia) Stanko Ostojić | Joma | Nektar |
| FK Sarajevo | (Bosnia and Herzegovina) Mehmed Janjoš | (Bosnia and Herzegovina) Haris Duljević | Nike | Turkish Airlines |
| FK Sloboda Tuzla | (Bosnia and Herzegovina) Vlado Jagodić | (Bosnia and Herzegovina) Amer Ordagić | Ardu | Wwin |
| NK Široki Brijeg | (Croatia) Goran Sablić | (Bosnia and Herzegovina) Jure Ivanković | Jako | Mepas |
| NK Vitez | (Bosnia and Herzegovina) Slaven Musa | (Bosnia and Herzegovina) Ivan Livaja | Joma | tioil |
| HŠK Zrinjski Mostar | (Bosnia and Herzegovina) Blaž Slišković | (Bosnia and Herzegovina) Pero Stojkić | Macron | PPD |
| FK Željezničar Sarajevo | (Serbia) Slavko Petrović | (Bosnia and Herzegovina) Zajko Zeba | Diadora | — |

=== Managerial changes ===
| Team | Outgoing | Manner | Exit date | | Incoming | Incoming date | | Ref. |
| Team | Outgoing | Manner | Announced on | Departed on | Incoming | Announced on | Arrived on | Ref. |
|---|---|---|---|---|---|---|---|---|
| NK Čelik Zenica | (Bosnia and Herzegovina) Elvedin Beganović | Resigned (joined FK Rudar Kakanj) | 30 June 2016 | | (Bosnia and Herzegovina) Kemal Alispahić | 1 July 2016 | | |
| NK Široki Brijeg | (Bosnia and Herzegovina) Slaven Musa | Resigned | 5 July 2016 | | (Croatia) Branko Karačić | 8 July 2016 | | |
| FK Željezničar Sarajevo | (Slovenia) Milos Kostic | Sacked | 22 August 2016 | | (Serbia) Slavko Petrović | 24 August 2016 | | |
| FK Radnik Bijeljina | (Serbia) Slavko Petrović | Resigned (joined FK Željezničar Sarajevo) | 23 August 2016 | | (Serbia) Nebojša Milošević | 25 August 2016 | | |
| FK Sarajevo | (Bosnia and Herzegovina) Almir Hurtić | Resigned (joined FK Željezničar Sarajevo) | 23 August 2016 | | (Bosnia and Herzegovina) Mehmed Janjoš | 29 August 2016 | | |
| FK Olimpik Sarajevo | (Bosnia and Herzegovina) Faik Kolar | Resigned (Health reasons) | 27 August 2016 | | (Bosnia and Herzegovina) Dragan Radović | 6 September 2016 | | |
| FK Sloboda Tuzla | (Bosnia and Herzegovina) Husref Musemić | Resigned | 11 September 2016 | | (Bosnia and Herzegovina) Vlado Jagodić | 11 October 2016 | | |
| NK Čelik Zenica | (Bosnia and Herzegovina) Kemal Alispahić | Sacked | 15 September 2016 | | (Bosnia and Herzegovina) Ivo Ištuk | 19 September 2016 | | |
| NK Vitez | (Croatia) Boris Pavić | Sacked | 24 September 2016 | | (Croatia) Slaven Musa | 4 October 2016 | | |
| FK Mladost Doboj Kakanj | (Bosnia and Herzegovina) Ibrahim Rahimić | Resigned (joined FK Velež Mostar) | 26 September 2016 | | (Bosnia and Herzegovina) Husref Musemić | 27 September 2016 | | |
| NK Široki Brijeg | (Croatia) Branko Karačić | Resigned | 3 October 2016 | | (Bosnia and Herzegovina) Denis Ćorić | 13 October 2016 | | |
| NK Čelik Zenica | (Bosnia and Herzegovina) Ivo Ištuk | Sacked | 1 November 2016 | | (Bosnia and Herzegovina) Nedim Jusufbegović | 2 November 2016 | | |
| FK Olimpik Sarajevo | (Bosnia and Herzegovina) Dragan Radović | Sacked | 1 November 2016 | | (Bosnia and Herzegovina) Asim Saračević | 2 November 2016 | | |
| NK Metalleghe-BSI | (Bosnia and Herzegovina) Nermin Bašić | Left by mutual consent | 8 November 2016 | | (Croatia) Mato Neretljak | 14 November 2016 | | |
| FK Olimpik Sarajevo | (Bosnia and Herzegovina) Asim Saračević | Sacked | 8 November 2016 | | (Croatia) Darko Dražić | 9 November 2016 | | |
| FK Olimpik Sarajevo | (Croatia) Darko Dražić | Sacked | 15 December 2016 | | (Bosnia and Herzegovina) Faruk Kulović | 27 December 2016 | | |
| HŠK Zrinjski Mostar | (Bosnia and Herzegovina) Vinko Marinović | Sacked | 27 December 2016 | | (Bosnia and Herzegovina) Ivica Barbarić | 3 January 2017 | | |
| NK Široki Brijeg | (Bosnia and Herzegovina) Denis Ćorić | Sacked | 16 January 2017 | | (Croatia) Goran Sablić | 18 January 2017 | | |
| FK Olimpik Sarajevo | (Bosnia and Herzegovina) Faruk Kulović | Sacked | 11 March 2017 | | (Bosnia and Herzegovina) Dragan Radović | 12 March 2017 | | |
| HŠK Zrinjski Mostar | (Bosnia and Herzegovina) Ivica Barbarić | Resigned | 18 March 2017 | | (Bosnia and Herzegovina) Blaž Slišković | 23 March 2017 | | |
| NK Čelik Zenica | (Bosnia and Herzegovina) Nedim Jusufbegović | Left by mutual consent | 19 March 2017 | | (Croatia) Boris Pavić | 19 March 2017 | | |

== Regular season ==
In contrast to previous seasons, this season has a two-stage format. In the regular season, each of the 12 teams play home-and-away once, resulting in 22 games played each. The top six teams in the regular season qualify for the Championship round, the bottom six teams qualify for the Relegation round. Each team then plays home-and-away against the other teams within their own group, for an additional ten games played each, a season total of 32 games.

| Pos | Team | Pld | W | D | L | GF | GA | GD | Pts | Qualification |
|---|---|---|---|---|---|---|---|---|---|---|
| 1 | Zrinjski Mostar | 22 | 13 | 6 | 3 | 38 | 19 | +19 | 45 | Qualification for the Championship round |
| 2 | Željezničar Sarajevo | 22 | 13 | 5 | 4 | 28 | 14 | +14 | 44 | Qualification for the Championship round |
| 3 | Sarajevo | 22 | 12 | 7 | 3 | 30 | 16 | +14 | 43 | Qualification for the Championship round |
| 4 | Radnik Bijeljina | 22 | 10 | 7 | 5 | 31 | 22 | +9 | 37 | Qualification for the Championship round |
| 5 | Sloboda Tuzla | 22 | 9 | 8 | 5 | 31 | 24 | +7 | 35 | Qualification for the Championship round |
| 6 | Krupa | 22 | 9 | 5 | 8 | 27 | 22 | +5 | 32 | Qualification for the Championship round |
| 7 | Široki Brijeg | 22 | 7 | 7 | 8 | 23 | 26 | −3 | 28 | Qualification for the Relegation round |
| 8 | Mladost Doboj Kakanj | 22 | 6 | 8 | 8 | 27 | 26 | +1 | 26 | Qualification for the Relegation round |
| 9 | Vitez | 22 | 5 | 8 | 9 | 12 | 19 | −7 | 23 | Qualification for the Relegation round |
| 10 | Metalleghe-BSI | 22 | 6 | 3 | 13 | 20 | 29 | −9 | 21 | Qualification for the Relegation round |
| 11 | Čelik Zenica | 22 | 2 | 7 | 13 | 14 | 34 | −20 | 13 | Qualification for the Relegation round |
| 12 | Olimpik | 22 | 2 | 5 | 15 | 15 | 45 | −30 | 11 | Qualification for the Relegation round |

Source: Football Association of Bosnia and Herzegovina, UEFA, Soccerway
Rules for classification: 1) Points; 2) Goal difference; 3) Goals scored; 4) Head-to-head points; 5) Head-to-head goal difference; 6) Head-to-head away goals (only if two teams); 7) Head-to-head goals scored; 8) Goal difference; 9) Play-off. (Criteria 2 and 3 are not used to decide champion, UEFA competition qualification, or relegation)

=== Results ===
| Home \ Away | ČEL | KRU | MET | MDK | OLI | RAD | SAR | SLO | ŠB | VIT | ZRI | ŽEL |
|---|---|---|---|---|---|---|---|---|---|---|---|---|
| Čelik Zenica | — | 1–2 | 1–3 | 2–2 | 3–0 | 0–1 | 1–1 | 0–2 | 0–1 | 0–1 | 1–1 | 1–1 |
| Krupa | 0–0 | — | 1–0 | 1–1 | 2–0 | 2–2 | 0–1 | 3–0 | 1–0 | 2–0 | 0–0 | 0–1 |
| Metalleghe-BSI | 1–1 | 0–2 | — | 2–0 | 1–1 | 1–2 | 0–2 | 0–0 | 1–0 | 0–1 | 0–4 | 0–1 |
| Mladost Doboj Kakanj | 1–0 | 0–1 | 3–2 | — | 3–0 | 0–0 | 0–0 | 3–1 | 3–1 | 1–2 | 0–1 | 0–0 |
| Olimpik | 3–0 | 0–3 | 0–2 | 2–3 | — | 0–3 | 0–1 | 3–3 | 3–1 | 0–0 | 0–5 | 0–2 |
| Radnik Bijeljina | 2–3 | 3–1 | 1–0 | 0–0 | 2–0 | — | 0–0 | 2–1 | 2–1 | 1–1 | 1–1 | 1–2 |
| Sarajevo | 4–0 | 3–2 | 1–2 | 4–3 | 1–0 | 2–0 | — | 1–1 | 2–0 | 1–0 | 2–0 | 0–0 |
| Sloboda Tuzla | 2–0 | 2–1 | 2–1 | 1–1 | 3–0 | 0–1 | 3–0 | — | 1–0 | 1–0 | 3–3 | 2–0 |
| Široki Brijeg | 1–0 | 3–1 | 3–1 | 2–1 | 0–0 | 2–2 | 2–2 | 2–2 | — | 1–1 | 1–1 | 1–0 |
| Vitez | 0–0 | 0–0 | 1–0 | 1–1 | 0–0 | 1–4 | 0–1 | 0–0 | 0–1 | — | 0–1 | 0–2 |
| Zrinjski Mostar | 4–0 | 3–1 | 0–2 | 2–1 | 4–1 | 2–1 | 1–0 | 2–0 | 0–0 | 2–1 | — | 0–4 |
| Željezničar Sarajevo | 1–0 | 2–1 | 2–1 | 1–0 | 3–2 | 2–0 | 1–1 | 1–1 | 2–0 | 0–2 | 0–1 | — |

Source: Football Association of Bosnia and Herzegovina
Legend: Blue = home team win; Yellow = draw; Red = away team win.
For upcoming matches, an "a" indicates there is an article about the rivalry between the two participants.

== Championship round ==
| Pos | Team | Pld | W | D | L | GF | GA | GD | Pts | Qualification |
|---|---|---|---|---|---|---|---|---|---|---|
| 1 | Zrinjski Mostar (C) | 32 | 18 | 10 | 4 | 54 | 25 | +29 | 64 | Qualification for the Champions League second qualifying round |
| 2 | Željezničar Sarajevo | 32 | 18 | 9 | 5 | 41 | 22 | +19 | 63 | Qualification for the Europa League first qualifying round |
| 3 | Sarajevo | 32 | 16 | 11 | 5 | 41 | 22 | +19 | 59 | Qualification for the Europa League first qualifying round |
| 4 | Krupa | 32 | 12 | 10 | 10 | 40 | 34 | +6 | 46 | |
| 5 | Sloboda Tuzla | 32 | 11 | 10 | 11 | 39 | 42 | −3 | 43 | |
| 6 | Radnik Bijeljina | 32 | 10 | 10 | 12 | 37 | 39 | −2 | 40 | |

Source: Football Association of Bosnia and Herzegovina, UEFA, Soccerway
Rules for classification: 1) Points; 2) Goal difference; 3) Goals scored; 4) Head-to-head points; 5) Head-to-head goal difference; 6) Head-to-head away goals (only if two teams); 7) Head-to-head goals scored; 8) Goal difference; 9) Play-off. (Criteria 2 and 3 are not used to decide champion, UEFA competition qualification, or relegation)
(C) Champions

=== Results ===
| Home \ Away | KRU | RAD | SAR | SLO | ZRI | ŽEL |
|---|---|---|---|---|---|---|
| Krupa | — | 1–1 | 1–0 | 3–0 | 1–1 | 1–1 |
| Radnik Bijeljina | 2–2 | — | 0–3 | 0–1 | 1–2 | 0–1 |
| Sarajevo | 1–1 | 1–1 | — | 1–0 | 0–0 | 1–0 |
| Sloboda Tuzla | 1–3 | 2–0 | 0–2 | — | 0–0 | 2–2 |
| Zrinjski Mostar | 4–0 | 2–0 | 3–2 | 3–0 | — | 0–0 |
| Željezničar Sarajevo | 1–0 | 2–1 | 0–0 | 4–2 | 2–1 | — |

Source: Football Association of Bosnia and Herzegovina
Legend: Blue = home team win; Yellow = draw; Red = away team win.
For upcoming matches, an "a" indicates there is an article about the rivalry between the two participants.

== Relegation round ==
| Pos | Team | Pld | W | D | L | GF | GA | GD | Pts | Relegation |
|---|---|---|---|---|---|---|---|---|---|---|
| 7 | Široki Brijeg | 32 | 9 | 10 | 13 | 34 | 35 | −1 | 37 | Qualification for the Europa League first qualifying round (Note: Široki Brijeg qualified for the Europa League first qualifying round by winning the 2016–17 Bosnia and Herzegovina Football Cup.) |
| 8 | Mladost Doboj Kakanj | 32 | 8 | 13 | 11 | 42 | 45 | −3 | 37 | |
| 9 | Vitez | 32 | 8 | 11 | 13 | 20 | 30 | −10 | 35 | |
| 10 | Čelik Zenica | 32 | 8 | 11 | 13 | 28 | 39 | −11 | 35 | |
| 11 | Metalleghe-BSI (R) | 32 | 7 | 11 | 14 | 25 | 34 | −9 | 32 | Relegation to the Prva Liga FBiH |
| 12 | Olimpik (R) | 32 | 5 | 8 | 19 | 28 | 62 | −34 | 23 | Relegation to the Prva Liga FBiH |

Source: Football Association of Bosnia and Herzegovina, UEFA, Soccerway
Rules for classification: 1) Points; 2) Goal difference; 3) Goals scored; 4) Head-to-head points; 5) Head-to-head goal difference; 6) Head-to-head away goals (only if two teams); 7) Head-to-head goals scored; 8) Goal difference; 9) Play-off. (Criteria 2 and 3 are not used to decide champion, UEFA competition qualification, or relegation)
(R) Relegated

=== Results ===
| Home \ Away | ČEL | MET | MDK | OLI | ŠB | VIT |
|---|---|---|---|---|---|---|
| Čelik Zenica | — | 0–0 | 1–0 | 4–1 | 1–0 | 1–0 |
| Metalleghe-BSI | 0–0 | — | 0–0 | 1–1 | 0–0 | 0–0 |
| Mladost Doboj Kakanj | 3–3 | 2–2 | — | 2–2 | 1–0 | 4–1 |
| Olimpik | 0–1 | 1–0 | 3–3 | — | 2–0 | 0–1 |
| Široki Brijeg | 1–1 | 0–1 | 4–0 | 5–1 | — | 0–1 |
| Vitez | 0–2 | 1–1 | 3–0 | 0–2 | 1–1 | — |

Source: Football Association of Bosnia and Herzegovina
Legend: Blue = home team win; Yellow = draw; Red = away team win.

== Top goalscorers ==
| Rank | Player | Club | Goals |
|---|---|---|---|
| 1 | (Croatia) Ivan Lendrić | Željezničar | 19 |
| 2 | (Bosnia and Herzegovina) Elvir Koljić | Krupa | 13 |
| 3 | (Bosnia and Herzegovina) Jasmin Mešanović | Zrinjski | 11 |
| 3 | (Bosnia and Herzegovina) Sulejman Krpić | Sloboda Tuzla | 11 |
| 5 | (Bosnia and Herzegovina) Mersudin Ahmetović | Sarajevo | 10 |
| 5 | (Montenegro) Marko Obradović | Radnik | 10 |
| 5 | (Bosnia and Herzegovina) Nemanja Bilbija | Zrinjski | 10 |
| 5 | (Serbia) Goran Brkić | Mladost Doboj Kakanj | 10 |
| 9 | (Brazil) Wagner | Široki Brijeg | 9 |
| 9 | (Bosnia and Herzegovina) Nermin Crnkić | Sarajevo | 9 |
| 9 | (Bosnia and Herzegovina) Luka Menalo | Široki Brijeg | 9 |
| 9 | (Bosnia and Herzegovina) Asim Zec | Sloboda Tuzla | 9 |

== Attendances ==
| # | Club | Average |
|---|---|---|
| 1 | Željezničar | 6,969 |
| 2 | Sarajevo | 4,875 |
| 3 | Zrinjski | 2,719 |
| 4 | Sloboda | 2,219 |
| 5 | Čelik | 1,800 |
| 6 | Široki | 1,140 |
| 7 | Krupa | 938 |
| 8 | Vitez | 847 |
| 9 | Mladost | 656 |
| 10 | Radnik | 607 |
| 11 | Olimpik | 484 |
| 12 | Metalleghe-BSI | 397 |
