= 2016–17 Bosnia and Herzegovina Football Cup =

Tournament details
- Country: Bosnia and Herzegovina

Final positions
- Champions: Široki Brijeg
- Runners-up: Sarajevo

Tournament statistics
- Matches played: 46
- Goals scored: 147 (3.2 per match)

The 2016–17 Bosnia and Herzegovina Football Cup was the 21st edition of Bosnia and Herzegovina's annual football cup, and a seventeenth season of the unified competition. The winner qualified to the first qualifying round of the 2017–18 UEFA Europa League.

Široki Brijeg won its third title after defeating Sarajevo.

== Participating teams ==
Following teams will take part in 2016–17 Bosnia and Herzegovina Football Cup. As Premier League decreased its number of teams by four, each of two entities got two additional slots for national cup so they have 12 and 8 slots respectively.

2016–17 Premier League	2016-17 Federation of BiH Cup	Football Association of Republika Srpska teams
Radnik Bijeljina ^{title holder}; Čelik Zenica; Krupa; Mladost DK; Metalleghe Jajce; Olimpic Sarajevo; Sarajevo; Sloboda Tuzla; Široki Brijeg; Vitez; Zrinjski Mostar; Željezničar Sarajevo	First League of the FBiH (II): Bratstvo Gračanica; Bosna Sema Sarajevo; Čapljina; Goražde; GOŠK Gabela; Radnički Lukavac; Orašje; Rudar Kakanj; Travnik; Velež Mostar; Zvijezda Gradačac; Second League of the FBiH (III): Brotnjo Čitluk (group South)	First League of the RS (II): Borac Banja Luka; Drina Zvornik; Kozara Gradiška; Podrinje Janja; Rudar Prijedor; Slavija Istočno Sarajevo; Sloboda Novi Grad; Regional League of the RS (IV): Karanovac (group West)

Roman number in brackets denote the level of respective league in Bosnian football league system in 2016-17 season

== Calendar ==
Round	Date(s)
1st Round	21 September 2016
2nd Round	18 October 2016 (leg 1); 26 October 2015 (leg 2)
Quarter final	8 March 2017 (leg 1); 15 March 2017 (leg 2)
Semi final	12 April 2017 (leg 1); 19 April 2017 (leg 2)
Final	10 May 2017 (leg 1); 17 May 2017 (leg 2)

== First round ==
Played on 21 September 2016

Home team	Away team	Result
Goražde (II)	Zvijezda Gradačac (II)	1–1 (4–3 p)
Slavija Istočno Sarajevo (II)	Vitez (I)	0–0 (5–4 p)
Kozara Gradiška (II)	Olimpic (I)	0–0 (3–2 p)
Rudar Kakanj (II)	Sloboda Novi Grad (II)	5–1
Radnički Lukavac (II)	Drina Zvornik (II)	3–1
Čelik Zenica (I)	Bosna Sema (II)	1–1 (4-5 p)
Orašje (II)	Karanovac (IV)	3–2
Metalleghe Jajce (I)	Velež Mostar (II)	1–2
Podrinje Janja (II)	Sloboda Tuzla (I)	0–1
Krupa (I)	Travnik (II)	1–3
Brotnjo Čitluk (III)	Željezničar (I)	0–7
Široki Brijeg (I)	Čapljina (II)	5–0
Mladost Doboj-Kakanj (I)	Rudar Prijedor (II)	1–0
GOŠK Gabela (II)	Radnik Bijeljina (I)	0–1
Zrinjski Mostar (I)	Borac Banja Luka (II)	5–0
Sarajevo (I)	Bratstvo Gračanica (II)	2–0

== Second round ==
Played between 18 and 26 October 2016; over two legs

Team 1	Team 2	Leg 1	Leg 2	Agg. score
Bosna Sema (II)	Radnički Lukavac (II)	6-0	2-3	8-3
Mladost Doboj-Kakanj	Slavija Istočno Sarajevo	6-1	2-0	8-1
Sloboda Tuzla (I)	Široki Brijeg (I)	1-0	0-2	1-2
Sarajevo (I)	Kozara Gradiška (II)	3-1	5-0	8-1
Željezničar Sarajevo (I)	Goražde (II)	5-1	3-0	8-1
Orašje (II)	Travnik (II)	1-1	1-3	2-4
Zrinjski Mostar (I)	Velež Mostar (II)	3-0	2-1	5-1
Rudar Kakanj (II)	Radnik Bijeljina (I)	0-1	1-5	1-6

== Quarter final ==
Played on 8 and 15 March 2017; over two legs

Team 1	Team 2	Leg 1	Leg 2	Agg. score
Mladost Doboj Kakanj (I)	Bosna Sema Sarajevo (II)	6–3	3–2	9–5
HŠK Zrinjski Mostar (I)	Široki Brijeg (I)	0–2	0–1	0–3
FK Radnik Bijeljina (I)	Željezničar Sarajevo (I)	2–2	0–2	2–4
Sarajevo (I)	NK Travnik (II)	2–0	2–2	4–2

== Semi final ==
Played on 12 and 19/26 April 2017; over two legs.

Team 1	Team 2	Leg 1	Leg 2	Agg. score
Sarajevo (I)	Mladost Doboj Kakanj (I)	1–1	3–2	4–3
Široki Brijeg (I)	Željezničar Sarajevo (I)	1–0	3–0	4–0

== Final ==
The final was played over two legs on 10 and 17 May, 2017.

Team 1	Team 2	Leg 1	Leg 2	Agg. score
Sarajevo (I)	Široki Brijeg (I)	0–1	1–0	1–1 (2–4 p)

=== First leg ===
10 May 2017
18:00

Sarajevo	0–1	Široki Brijeg
		Barišić 45'

Asim Ferhatović Hase Stadium, Sarajevo
Attendance: 7,000
Referee: Оgnjen Valjić

=== Second leg ===
17 May 2017
20:00

Široki Brijeg	0–1	Sarajevo
		Am. Bekić 68'
Penalties
Krstanović (penalty missed); Ivanković (penalty scored); Barišić (penalty scored); Ćorić (penalty scored); Čabraja (penalty scored)	4–2	(penalty missed) Husejinović; (penalty scored) Al. Bekić; (penalty missed) Rustemović; (penalty scored) Ahmetović

Pecara Stadium, Široki Brijeg
Attendance: 5,000
Referee: Edin Jakupović
