= Neđo Šuka =

Bosnian footballer

Personal information
- Full name: Neđo Šuka
- Date of birth: 13 August 1987 (age 39)
- Place of birth: Sokolac, SFR Yugoslavia
- Height: 1.82 m (5 ft 11 1/2 in)
- Position: Centre forward

Senior career*
Years	Team	Apps	(Gls)
2005–2011	Sutjeska Foča		
2011	Rudar Prijedor	9	(2)
2012	Sutjeska Foča		
2012	Mladost Velika Obarska		
2013	Sutjeska Foča	12	(5)
2014	Donji Srem	1	(0)
2014	Kozara Gradiška	11	(3)
2015	Drina HE Višegrad	12	(8)
2015	Goražde	7	(0)
2016	Borac Šamac		
2016–2017	Sutjeska Foča	25	(7)
2017–2018	Alfa Modriča	11	(4)
- * Club domestic league appearances and goals as of 20 April 2014

Neđo Šuka (Serbian Cyrillic: Неђо Шука; born 13 August 1987) is a Bosnian Serb football forward who last played for FK Modriča in the Second League of the Republika Srpska.

== Club career ==
He previously played for Sutjeska Foča, Rudar Prijedor, Mladost Velika Obarska, Donji Srem and Koraza Gradiška. After leaving Borac Šamac in summer 2016 he returned to Sutjeska once again.

He left Modriča in January 2019.

== Honours ==
Individual:

- First League of the Republika Srpska top-scorer: 2014–15 (with Kozara & Drina HE, 11 goals)
