= Josip Barišić (footballer, born 1983) =

Bosnian footballer (born 1983)

Personal information
- Date of birth: 12 August 1983 (age 43)
- Place of birth: Posušje, SFR Yugoslavia
- Height: 1.89 m (6 ft 2 in)
- Position: Centre-back

Youth career
- –2002: Posušje

Senior career*
Years	Team	Apps	(Gls)
2002–2005	Posušje	81	(3)
2005–2006	Zagreb	0	(0)
2006–2007	Posušje	42	(4)
2008–2011	Široki Brijeg	78	(1)
2011–2013	Hajduk Split	5	(0)
2013	Imotski	12	(2)
2013–2020	Široki Brijeg	154	(2)
2020–2022	Posušje	49	(6)
Total		421	(18)

International career
2010	Bosnia and Herzegovina	1	(0)
- * Club domestic league appearances and goals as of 20 June 2022

Josip Barišić (born 12 August 1983) is a Bosnian former professional footballer who played as a centre-back.

Barišić made 382 Bosnian Premier League appearances for Posušje and Široki Brijeg, the highest number of Bosnian Premier League appearances in history. He also represented Bosnia and Herzegovina at international level.

== Club career ==
In his career, Barišić played for his hometown club Posušje in which he returned after a short spell at Zagreb. He played in 123 league matches and scored 7 goals for Posušje. Then he joined Široki Brijeg as a free player. He was transferred to Hajduk Split in 2011 for €150,000 and signed a three-and-a-half-year contract with the Split based team.

After Hajduk, Barišić played for a short period at Imotski, but shortly after returned to Široki Brijeg. In May 2017, Barišić won his first trophy with Široki Brijeg, the 2016–17 Bosnian Cup after beating Sarajevo in the final. On 2 June 2020, he decided to leave Široki Brijeg seven years after returning to the club.

On 22 June 2020, Barišić came back to Posušje and signed a contract with the club. He won the First League of FBiH title with Posušje in the 2020–21 season, earning promotion to the Bosnian Premier League. Barišić left the club and announced his retirement from professional football after the end of the 2021–22 season. With 382 appearances in the Bosnian Premier League, he has made the highest number of appearances in the league's history.

== International career ==
In 2010, Barišić was called up to the Bosnia and Herzegovina national team and made his debut for the team on 10 December 2010 in a friendly match against Poland in Antalya, Turkey.

== Honours ==
Široki Brijeg

- Bosnian Cup: 2016–17

Posušje

- First League of FBiH: 2020–21
