= 2022–23 First League of the Republika Srpska =

First League of the Republika Srpska
- Season: 2022–23
- Dates: 6 August 2022 – 3 June 2023
- Champions: Krupa; 4th First League title
- Promoted: Zvijezda 09
- Relegated: Podrinje Janja; Tekstilac Derventa
- Matches: 306
- Goals: 900 (2.94 per match)
- Top goalscorer: Bojan Marković (26 goals)

The 2022–23 First League of the Republika Srpska was the twenty-eighth season of the First League of the Republika Srpska, the second tier football league of Bosnia and Herzegovina, since its original establishment and the twenty-first as a second-tier league. The season began on 6 August 2022 and ended on 3 June 2023.

== Teams ==
- Drina Zvornik
- Famos Vojkovići
- Kozara Gradiška
- Krupa
- Laktaši
- Ljubić Prnjavor
- Modriča
- Omarska
- Podrinje Janja
- Radnik Bijeljina
- Rudar Prijedor
- Slavija Sarajevo
- Sloboda Mrkonjić Grad
- Sloboda Novi Grad
- Sutjeska Foča
- Tekstilac Derventa
- Zvijezda 09
- Željezničar Banja Luka

== League table ==
Pos	Team	Pld	W	D	L	GF	GA	GD	Pts	Promotion or relegation
1	Krupa (Note: Krupa were prevented from promotion to the Premier League due to failing to obtain a license for it.) (C)	34	27	4	3	98	24	+74	85	
2	Zvijezda 09 (Note: Zvijezda 09 were given a license to compete in the Premier League and were selected as Krupa's replacement.) (P)	34	20	9	5	77	26	+51	69	Promotion to the Premijer Liga BIH
3	Laktaši	34	22	3	9	76	34	+42	69	
4	Slavija	34	15	10	9	56	40	+16	55	
5	Sloboda Novi Grad	34	16	7	11	51	42	+9	55	
6	Rudar Prijedor	34	14	11	9	48	34	+14	53	
7	Radnik Bijeljina	34	15	8	11	47	33	+14	53	
8	Sutjeska Foča	34	14	4	16	48	60	−12	46	
9	Kozara	34	12	7	15	48	56	−8	43	
10	Željezničar Banja Luka	34	12	7	15	41	57	−16	43	
11	Ljubić Prnjavor	34	13	2	19	41	66	−25	41	
12	Famos Vojkovići	34	12	4	18	40	53	−13	40	
13	Sloboda Mrkonjić Grad	34	11	7	16	45	59	−14	40	
14	Drina Zvornik	34	12	2	20	44	53	−9	38	
15	Omarska	34	11	5	18	42	76	−34	38	
16	Alfa Modriča	34	10	3	21	32	73	−41	33	
17	Podrinje Janja (R)	34	8	7	19	38	62	−24	31	Relegation to the Second League RS
18	Tekstilac Derventa (R)	34	7	10	17	28	52	−24	31	Relegation to the Second League RS

Source: SportDC
Rules for classification: 1) Points; 2) Head-to-head points; 3) Head-to-head goal difference; 4) Head-to-head goals scored; 5) Head-to-head away goals scored (only if two teams); 6) Goal difference; 7) Goals scored; 8) Play-off.
(C) Champions; (P) Promoted; (R) Relegated

== See also ==
- 2022–23 Premier League of Bosnia and Herzegovina
- 2022–23 First League of the Federation of Bosnia and Herzegovina
- 2022–23 Bosnia and Herzegovina Football Cup
