= FK Vlasenica =

- Full name: Fudbalski klub Vlasenica
- Founded: 1945
- Ground: Gradski Stadion
- Capacity: 1,000
- Chairman: Đuro Vuksić
- League: Second League RS - East
- 2015–16: First League RS, 12th (relegated)

Fudbalski klub Vlasenica (Serbian Cyrillic: Фудбалски клуб Власеница) is a football club from Vlasenica, Republika Srpska, Bosnia and Herzegovina. The club competed in the First League of the Republika Srpska. However, due to poor results FK Vlasenica was relegated to the Second League of the Republika Srpska, a third-tier competition in Bosnia and Herzegovina.

The club was founded in 1945.
