= Milos Kostic =

Canadian athlete (born 1941)

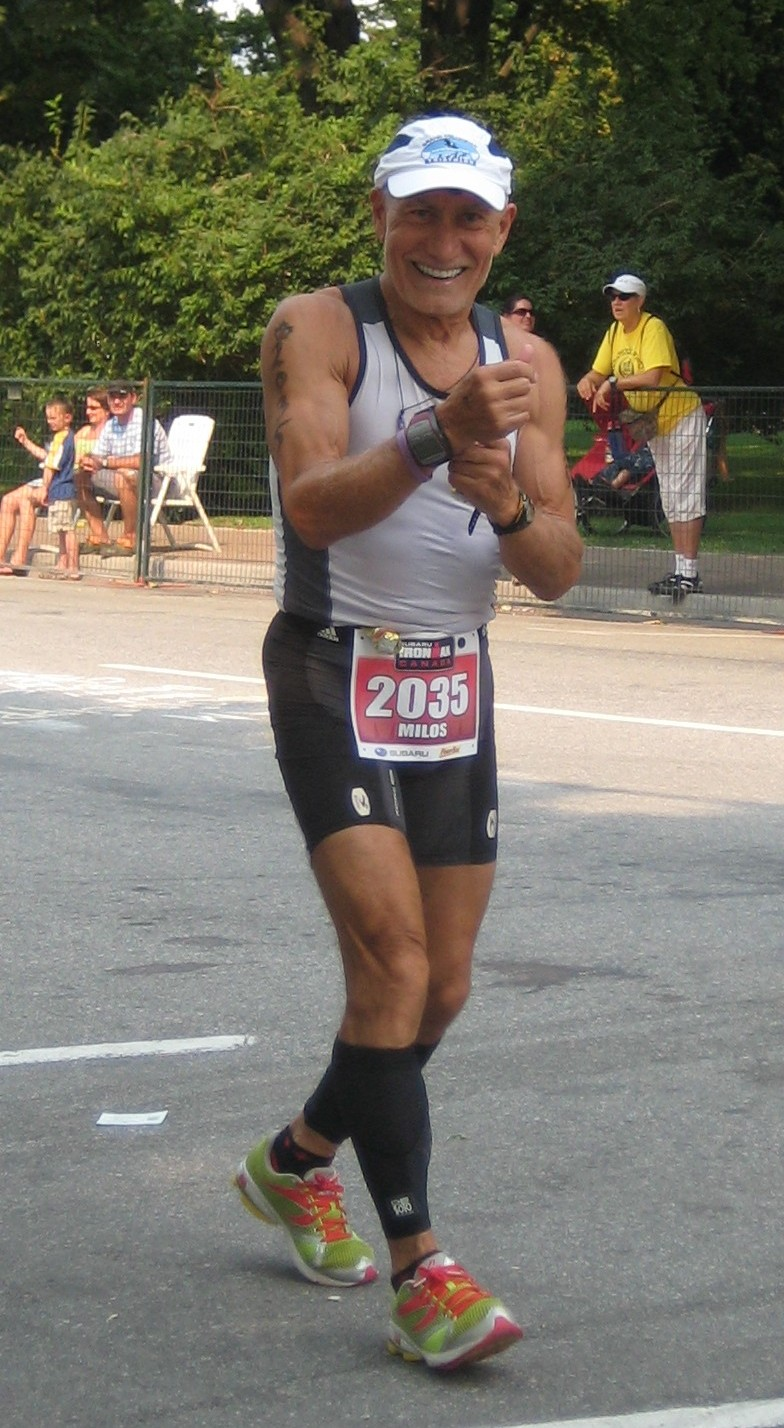
- Milos Kostic on his way to setting the course record for his age group in the 2009 Penticton Ironman Championship.

Personal information
- Born: April 18, 1941 (age 84)

Sport
- Country: Canada
- Sport: Athletics
- Event(s): Triathlon, marathon, ultrarunning

Milos Kostic (born April 18, 1941) from Regina, Saskatchewan is the former world record holder of the Ironman World Championship in the Men's 65-69 age group with a time of 11 hours 29 minutes 45 seconds set in 2006. His time was beaten by William Christopher Wren who finished the course in 2013 with a time of 10 hours, 44 minutes and 31 seconds.

He has won his age group there in Kona every time he has raced there, in 2006, 2007, 2008, 2009, 2011, and 2012. He won his age group at the Ironman 70.3 World Championship in 2011 and 2012. In 2011 he set the world record of the Ironman World Championship in the Men's 70-74 age group with a time of 11 hours 14 minutes.

In 2006, 2007, and 2008 he was awarded the Canadian Grand Master Athlete of the Year by Triathlon Canada. He was selected as Triathlon Magazine Canada's athlete of the year for 2012.

Kostic attended the University of British Columbia as a foreign student from Belgrade, Yugoslavia (now Serbia). After obtaining a degree in engineering, he remained in Canada, moving to Regina.

- 2006 Saskatchewan Sport, Masters Athlete of the Year
- 2006 Triathlon Canada, Masters Long Distance Triathlon Athlete of the Year
- 2007 Triathlon Canada Grand Master (60+) Male Athlete of the Year
- 2007 Triathlon Magazine Canada, Masters Athlete of the Year
- 2008 Triathlon Canada Grand Master (60+) Male Athlete of the Year
- Ironman Canada Iron Spirit Award, August 30, 2009
- 2009 Triathlon Magazine Canada, Age Group Triathlete of the Year
- 2012 Triathlon Magazine Canada, Triathlete of the Year

In June 2015 was inducted into the Saskatchewan Sports Hall of Fame. In 2022 he placed first in the male 80 plus category at the Boston Marathon with a time of 5:11:48.
