= 2015–16 First League of the Republika Srpska =

First League of the Republika Srpska
- Season: 2015–16
- Champions: Krupa; 1st First League title
- Promoted: Krupa
- Relegated: Mladost (VO); Leotar; Sloboda (NG); Drina HE; Vlasenica
- Matches: 192
- Goals: 516 (2.69 per match)

The 2015–16 First League of the Republika Srpska was the twenty-first season of the First League of the Republika Srpska, the second tier football league of Bosnia and Herzegovina, since its original establishment and the fourteenth as a second-tier league.

== Clubs ==
Location of clubs in 2015–16 First League RS
- FK Borac Šamac
- FK Drina HE Višegrad
- FK Kozara Gradiška
- FK Krupa
- FK Leotar
- FK Mladost Velika Obarska
- FK Sloboda Mrkonjić Grad
- FK Sloboda Novi Grad
- FK Sutjeska Foča
- FK Tekstilac Derventa
- FK Vlasenica
- FK Zvijezda 09 Etno Selo Stanišići

== Regular season ==
Pos	Team	Pld	W	D	L	GF	GA	GD	Pts	Qualification
1	Krupa	22	16	2	4	43	16	+27	50	Qualification for the Championship round
2	Mladost Velika Obarska	22	14	7	1	50	16	+34	49	Qualification for the Championship round
3	Tekstilac Derventa	22	10	7	5	33	20	+13	37	Qualification for the Championship round
4	Zvijezda 09	22	9	7	6	30	24	+6	34	Qualification for the Championship round
5	Kozara	22	9	6	7	29	17	+12	33	Qualification for the Championship round
6	Borac Šamac	22	8	6	8	26	23	+3	30	Qualification for the Championship round
7	Sloboda Mrkonjić Grad	22	8	4	10	25	37	−12	28	Qualification for the Relegation round
8	Sloboda Novi Grad	22	8	3	11	27	31	−4	27	Qualification for the Relegation round
9	Leotar	22	7	5	10	23	32	−9	26	Qualification for the Relegation round
10	Sutjeska Foča	22	7	4	11	19	32	−13	25	Qualification for the Relegation round
11	Drina HE Višegrad	22	5	3	14	15	36	−21	18	Qualification for the Relegation round
12	Vlasenica	22	3	2	17	17	53	−36	11	Qualification for the Relegation round

Source: Soccerway
Rules for classification: 1) Points; 2) Head-to-head points; 3) Head-to-head goal difference; 4) Head-to-head goals scored; 5) Head-to-head away goals scored (only if two teams); 6) Goal difference; 7) Goals scored; 8) Play-off.

== Promotion round ==
Pos	Team	Pld	W	D	L	GF	GA	GD	Pts	Promotion or relegation
1	Krupa (C, P)	32	25	3	4	64	21	+43	78	Promotion to the Premijer Liga BiH
2	Mladost Velika Obarska (R)	32	18	8	6	68	29	+39	62	Relegation to the Regional League RS (Note: Mladost Velika Obarska were relegated to the Regional League due to the financial problems.)
3	Tekstilac Derventa	32	13	12	7	45	29	+16	51	
4	Kozara	32	14	7	11	44	36	+8	49	
5	Zvijezda 09	32	13	9	10	47	39	+8	48	
6	Borac Šamac	32	8	8	16	35	54	−19	32	

Source: Soccerway
Rules for classification: 1) Points; 2) Head-to-head points; 3) Head-to-head goal difference; 4) Head-to-head goals scored; 5) Head-to-head away goals scored (only if two teams); 6) Goal difference; 7) Goals scored; 8) Play-off.
(C) Champions; (P) Promoted; (R) Relegated

== Relegation round ==
Pos	Team	Pld	W	D	L	GF	GA	GD	Pts	Relegation
7	Sutjeska Foča	32	14	6	12	39	37	+2	48	
8	Sloboda Mrkonjić Grad	32	14	6	12	43	46	−3	48	
9	Leotar (R)	32	14	6	12	40	43	−3	48	Relegation to the Second League RS
10	Sloboda Novi Grad (R)	32	11	6	15	40	43	−3	39	Relegation to the Second League RS
11	Drina HE Višegrad (R)	32	7	4	21	24	59	−35	25	Relegation to the Second League RS
12	Vlasenica (R)	32	3	3	26	27	80	−53	12	Relegation to the Second League RS

Source: Soccerway
Rules for classification: 1) Points; 2) Head-to-head points; 3) Head-to-head goal difference; 4) Head-to-head goals scored; 5) Head-to-head away goals scored (only if two teams); 6) Goal difference; 7) Goals scored; 8) Play-off.
(R) Relegated

== See also ==
- 2015–16 Premier League of Bosnia and Herzegovina
- 2015–16 First League of the Federation of Bosnia and Herzegovina
- 2015–16 Bosnia and Herzegovina Football Cup
