= Jure Ivanković =

Bosnian football manager (born 1985)

Personal information
- Date of birth: 15 November 1985 (age 40)
- Place of birth: Široki Brijeg, SR Bosnia and Herzegovina, Yugoslavia
- Height: 1.80 m (5 ft 11 in)
- Position: Midfielder

Team information
- Current team: Hajduk Split (assistant coach)

Youth career
- –2004: Široki Brijeg

Senior career*
Years	Team	Apps	(Gls)
2004–2006	Široki Brijeg	21	(1)
2006	→ Imotski (loan)	7	(0)
2006–2009	Posušje	75	(11)
2009–2018	Široki Brijeg	204	(19)
Total		307	(31)

International career
2010	Bosnia and Herzegovina	1	(0)

Managerial career
- 2020–2021: Široki Brijeg (assistant)
- 2021–2022: Široki Brijeg
- 2022–2023: Široki Brijeg (U19)
- 2023–: Hajduk Split (assistant)
- 2024: Hajduk Split (interim)
- * Club domestic league appearances and goals

Jure Ivanković (born 15 November 1985) is a Bosnian professional football manager and former player who is the assistant manager of Croatian Football League club Hajduk Split.

== International career ==
Ivanković made his debut for Bosnia and Herzegovina in a December 2010 friendly match against Poland. It remained his sole international appearance.

== Managerial statistics ==
As of 24 May 2024

Managerial record by team and tenure
Team	From	To	Record							
Team	From	To	G	W	D	L	GF	GA	GD	Win %
Široki Brijeg	5 August 2021	21 April 2022	27	10	9	8	25	29	−4	37.04
Hajduk Split	8 April 2024	Present	7	4	1	2	15	8	+7	57.14
Total			34	14	10	10	40	37	+3	41.18

== Honours ==
=== Player ===
Široki Brijeg

- Bosnian Cup: 2012–13, 2016–17
