= Gradski Stadion (Krupa na Vrbasu) =

Football Stadium

Krupa na Vrbasu City Stadium
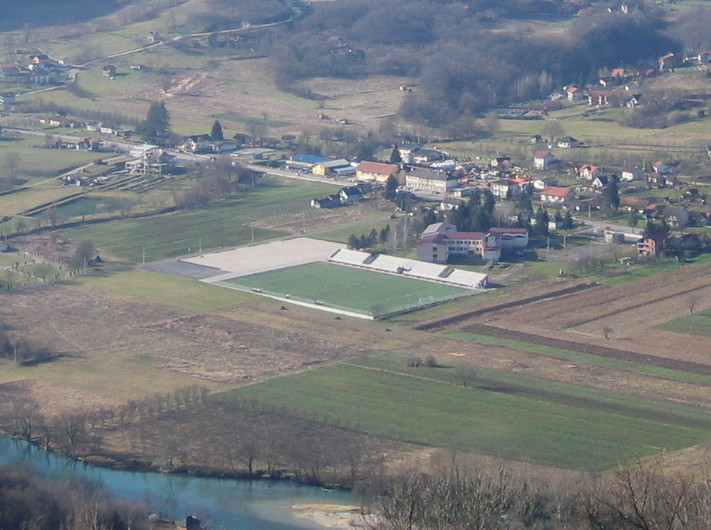
- Interactive map of Krupa na Vrbasu City Stadium
- Location: Krupa na Vrbasu, Bosnia and Herzegovina
- Coordinates: 44.617561°N 17.147383°E
- Capacity: 3,500

Tenants
- FK Krupa

Krupa na Vrbasu City Stadium is a multi-use stadium in Krupa na Vrbasu, Bosnia and Herzegovina. It is the home ground of First League of the Republika Srpska club FK Krupa. The stadium capacity is 3,500 seats.
