= Premier League of Bosnia and Herzegovina =

Top tier association football league, Bosnia and Herzegovina

- Organising body: N/FSBiH
- Founded: 2000; 26 years ago
- First season: 2000–01
- Country: Bosnia and Herzegovina
- Confederation: UEFA
- Number of clubs: 10
- Level on pyramid: 1
- Relegation to: First League of FBiH; First League of RS
- Domestic cups: Bosnian Cup; Bosnian Supercup
- International cup(s): UEFA Champions League; UEFA Conference League
- Current champions: Borac (4th title) (2025–26)
- Most championships: Zrinjski (9 titles)
- Most appearances: Josip Barišić (382)
- Top scorer: Nemanja Bilbija (205)
- Broadcasters: Arena Sport; MY TV
- Website: nfsbih.ba
- Current: 2026–27 Premier League

The Premier League of Bosnia and Herzegovina (Bosnian: Premijer liga Bosne i Hercegovine), officially known as the Wwin League of Bosnia and Herzegovina for sponsorship purposes, is the top tier football league in Bosnia and Herzegovina, and is operated by the Football Association of Bosnia and Herzegovina. As the country's most prestigious level of football competition, the league changed format in the 2025–26 season and is contested by 10 clubs with the last two teams relegated at the end of every season.

As of the 2026–27 season, the league is represented by four clubs in European competition. The winner of the Premier League starts from the UEFA Champions League first qualifying round. The winner of the Bosnian Cup starts from the second qualifying round of the UEFA Conference League, while the runner-up and third placed team on the table start from the UEFA Conference League first qualifying round.

The bottom two teams are relegated at the end of the season, while the winners of the First League of the Federation of Bosnia and Herzegovina and the First League of the Republika Srpska are promoted to the Premier League.

== History ==
=== War period (1992–1996) ===
After the breakup of Yugoslavia, and following proclamation of independence in late winter 1992, many clubs from Bosnia and Herzegovina left the Yugoslav First League. In April 1992, the N/FSBiH applied for membership with FIFA and UEFA. Meanwhile, due to the outbreak of the Bosnian War in April 1992, no games were played in the 1992–93 season. In late 1993 some parts of the country re-launched football competitions with reduced scope. But just as the country was divided along ethnic lines, so was football.

In 1993, Croats launched the Football Federation of Herzeg-Bosnia and its First League of Herzeg-Bosnia, in which only Croat clubs competed on parochial scale within the limits of West Herzegovina and a few other enclaves. In the same year Serbs also organized their own First League of the Republika Srpska, on a territory held by Republika Srpska at the time. Only football on a territory under the control of the then Republic of Bosnia and Herzegovina institutions and auspices of N/FSBiH, at the time consequently with Bosniak majority, apart from a brief competition for the 1994–95 season (won by Čelik Zenica), came to a standstill. Competition under auspices of the N/FSBiH did not resume until the 1995–96 season when the First League of Bosnia and Herzegovina was launched.

=== Post-war period (1996–2000) ===
These three separate football leagues were operating in Bosnia and Herzegovina until 1998, and 2000. Since FIFA and UEFA showed support only for the association operating under patronage of the official and internationally recognized state institutions, during the war and prior to the Dayton Agreement, as well as after its signage, they endorsed unification of all three organizations as the N/FSBiH. This also came as a consequence of FIFA's decision to recognize the N/FSBiH already in July 1996, while in the same year UEFA admitted the N/FSBiH as an adjacent member until 1998 when they recognized its full membership. This meant that only N/FSBiH clubs and its national team could compete at the international and official level.

Final unification was preceded by several stages. At first, a play-off was created where clubs were playing for the title under N/FSBiH auspices. The idea was that a play-off under unified N/FSBiH auspices should bring together clubs competing under three separate organizations for the first time but was rejected by the Serb association, leaving clubs from the Croat football association and the N/FSBiH participating the play-off for the seasons 1997–98 and 1999–00, while the 1998–99 play-off was cancelled due to the Croat's association hesitation on the decision on which stadiums games should be played. Next season the play-off was resumed for the last time prior to the full and final agreement on a unified N/FSBiH and its competition, the Bosnian Premier League (Premijer Liga), in the fall of 2000.

=== Premier League creation (2000) ===
The first 2000–01 season saw clubs from the Federation of Bosnia and Herzegovina entity only, while clubs from the Republika Srpska entity continued to compete in their own separate league as their entity association still refused to join the agreed unified N/FSBiH and its new competition. However, UEFA and FIFA never intended to recognize this separate organization nor its competition, which meant clubs could not compete outside the territory of the entity and would not compete internationally. This situation forced clubs to insist that their organization also join the N/FSBiH, and two years later they became part of the competition for the 2002–03 season. Ever since the year 2000 the Premier League is the top tier of Bosnia and Herzegovina football, with two entity-based leagues, the First League of Republika Srpska and the First League of the Federation of Bosnia and Herzegovina, being pushed to the second tier of the Bosnian football pyramid and serve as feeder leagues to the Premier League.

=== Liga 12 (2016–2025) ===
During the seasons 2016–17 and the 2017–18, the league had entirely changed its format, reducing the number of clubs from 16 to 12, thus sometimes referred to as "Liga 12" (League 12), with the calendar also modified accordingly, reintroducing the play-offs (also known as the "title playoffs") and introducing the play out.

The number of matches was played by each club during the regular season after which, according to their position, they entered to the play-offs or the play out. The play-offs were contested by the top six clubs in the regular season, with each club playing each other twice for the title, which guaranteed Champions League qualifications, while second and third place guaranteed Europa League qualifications berths. The play out was contested by the bottom six clubs to avoid relegation, with the last two teams being relegated.

Since the 2018–19 season, after all the 12 clubs have played against each other two times, once home and once away, they play against each other one more time, playing either home or away depending on how the schedule is made. With that, the league season has 33 full rounds, instead of the 22 rounds and an additional 10 rounds in the relegation and championship games in the 2016–17 and 2017–18 seasons.

=== Liga 10 (2025–present) ===
In May 2024, the N/FSBiH decided that the number of teams competing in the Premier League would be reduced to ten, starting from the 2025–26 season.

== Sponsorship ==
On 31 July 2012, the Football Association of Bosnia and Herzegovina signed a two-year deal with BH Telecom regarding the sponsorship of the league, effectively renaming the league BH Telecom Premier League. The deal was extended once more before the start of 2014–15 season. On 24 July 2020, it was announced that Mtel had become the new league sponsor for the next three years with an estimate 23 Million BAM worth, renaming the league m:tel Premier League.

On 9 February 2024, a five-year deal with gambling company Wwin was signed by the Bosnian FA, officially changing the league's name to the Wwin League of Bosnia and Herzegovina.

== Clubs ==
Forty-one clubs have played in the Premier League of Bosnia and Herzegovina from its inception in 2000, up to and including the 2026–27 season. Željezničar, Sarajevo, Zrinjski Mostar and Široki Brijeg are the only clubs in the Premier League to have never been relegated.

=== Champions ===
Club	Winners	Runners-up	Winning seasons
Zrinjski	9	2	2004–05, 2008–09, 2013–14, 2015–16, 2016–17, 2017–18, 2021–22, 2022–23, 2024–25
Željezničar	5	7	2000–01, 2001–02, 2009–10, 2011–12, 2012–13
Sarajevo	4	4	2006–07, 2014–15, 2018–19, 2019–20
Borac	4	2	2010–11, 2020–21, 2023–24, 2025–26
Široki Brijeg	2	5	2003–04, 2005–06
Modriča	1	0	2007–08
Leotar	1	0	2002–03

=== 2026–27 season ===
Ten clubs are competing in the 2026–27 season – eight from the previous season and two promoted from each of the second-level leagues.

Locations of the 2026–27 Premier League of BiH clubs

Team	Location	Stadium	Capacity
Borac	Banja Luka	Banja Luka City Stadium	10,030
BSK	Banja Luka	Stadion Krupa na Vrbasu (Note: BSK plays its home matches at Stadion Krupa na Vrbasu, since their home ground, Stadion Čaire, did not meet the required standards for Premier League games.)	3,500
Čelik	Zenica	Bilino Polje	13,694
Radnik	Bijeljina	Bijeljina City Stadium	6,000
Sarajevo	Sarajevo	Asim Ferhatović Hase	34,700
Sloga	Doboj	Luke Stadium	3,000
Široki Brijeg	Široki Brijeg	Pecara	7,000
Velež	Mostar	Rođeni Stadium	7,000
Zrinjski	Mostar	Bijeli Brijeg	9,000
Željezničar	Sarajevo	Grbavica	13,057

== International competitions ==
In the qualifiers for the 2002–03 UEFA Champions League, Željezničar gained the first big success in Bosnian post-war club-football, going all the way to the last qualifying round for the most important club competition in Europe. After big wins over ÍA Akraness and Lillestrøm, however, they were held by Newcastle United. In the first match, held in Sarajevo, Newcastle won 0–1 with English team defeating Željezničar 4–0 in England.

The second time a Bosnian club moved into the last qualifying round of the UEFA Champions League was FK Sarajevo in 2007–08, when they lost to Dynamo Kyiv 0–4 on aggregate, after going over Maltese Marsaxlokk and Belgian side Genk.

Another remarkable season for Bosnian clubs in Europe was 2009–10. The most memorable performances were marked by Sarajevo and Slavija. While Slavija surprisingly beat Aalborg in the second qualifying round but could not overcome MFK Košice in the third round, Sarajevo was able to reach the Play-offs for the Group Stage of the newly formed UEFA Europa League after beating Spartak Trnava and Helsingborg. However, they lost there unhappily 3–2 on aggregate to CFR Cluj. Sarajevo made it again in the 2014–15 UEFA Europa League, playing all the way to the play-off round where they lost to Borussia Mönchengladbach. In the 2020–21 UEFA Europa League season, Sarajevo once again played in the play-off round, this time losing to Celtic.

After getting eliminated from the 2022–23 UEFA Champions League first qualifying round, Zrinjski Mostar made it to the 2022–23 UEFA Europa Conference League play-off round, where they got eliminated by Slovak club Slovan Bratislava following a penalty shoot-out, missing out on a chance to play in the group stage.

In August 2023, Zrinjski became the first ever club from Bosnia and Herzegovina to reach the group stages of a European club competition after eliminating Icelandic club Breiðablik in the 2023–24 UEFA Europa League third qualifying round, which assured Zrinjski of a group stage spot in the UEFA Europa Conference League as a minimum. After losing to LASK in the Europa League play-off round, Zrinjski dropped into the Conference League group stage, where they were drawn into Group E alongside Aston Villa, AZ and Legia Warsaw. On matchday one, Zrinjski pulled off an astonishing comeback against AZ. Trailing 3–0 at half time, the team made history and came back to win 4–3. This result also meant that they became the first ever side from Bosnia and Herzegovina to win a game in a UEFA club competition group stage. The team lost their next four games in the group, before ending their European campaign with a home draw against Aston Villa on 14 December 2023.

=== Rankings ===
Ranking			Member association (L: League, C: Cup, LC: League Cup)	Coefficient						Teams (Note: Number of teams still active from association in UEFA Champions League, UEFA Europa League or UEFA Conference League.)	Regular places in 2026–27 season (Note: European Performance Spots: The two associations with the highest one-year coefficient in the most recent season are awarded an additional berth in the Champions League league phase.)			
2025	2024	Mvmt	Member association (L: League, C: Cup, LC: League Cup)	2020–21	2021–22	2022–23	2023–24	2024–25	Total	Teams	CL	EL	CO	Total
35	41	+6	Iceland (L, C)	0.625	1.500	3.000	3.833	2.875	11.833	1/4				
36	37	+1	Latvia (L, C)	1.375	2.625	2.750	1.625	3.125	11.500	1/4				
37	34	–3	Finland (L, C)	1.375	3.750	2.625	1.750	2.000	11.500	1/4				
38	39	+1	(Bosnia and Herzegovina) Bosnia and Herzegovina (L, C)	2.625	1.625	2.000	2.250	2.500	11.000	1/4				
39	38	–1	(Faroe Islands) Faroe Islands (L, C)	2.750	1.500	2.250	2.750	1.500	10.750	0/4				
40	33	–7	Kazakhstan (L, C)	1.000	2.875	1.125	3.125	2.500	10.625	1/4				
41	45	+4	Malta (L, C)	1.500	1.875	2.625	1.500	1.000	8.500	0/4				

== All time table ==
Counting only since the 2002–03 season, the season the league became a unified country-wide league.
As of the end of the 2025–26 season. Teams in bold are part of the 2026–27 season.

Ssn = Number of seasons; Pld = Matches played; W = Matches won; D = Matches drawn; L = Matches lost; GF = Goals for; GA = Goals against; GD = Goal difference; Pts = Points; HF = Highest finish

Rank	Club	Home	Ssn	Pld	W	D	L	GF	GA	GD	Pts	HF
1	**Zrinjski**	Mostar	24	748	429	132	187	1,239	704	+535	1,418 (-1)	1
2	**Sarajevo**	Sarajevo	24	748	395	180	173	1,231	670	+561	1,362 (-3)	1
3	**Željezničar**	Sarajevo	24	748	377	168	203	1,107	702	+405	1,299	1
4	**Široki Brijeg**	Široki Brijeg	24	748	347	184	217	1,096	767	+329	1,225	1
5	**Borac**	Banja Luka	20	623	321	110	192	863	599	+264	1,072 (-1)	1
6	Sloboda	Tuzla	20	619	217	134	268	643	744	−101	782 (-3)	2
7	**Velež**	Mostar	18	561	206	135	220	673	677	−4	750 (-3)	3
8	**Čelik**	Zenica	18	547	195	134	218	609	669	−60	716 (-3)	3
9	Leotar	Trebinje	14	434	167	65	202	504	617	−113	566	1
10	**Radnik**	Bijeljina	14	434	129	113	192	443	575	−132	500	5
11	Slavija	Istočno Sarajevo	12	360	137	65	158	416	493	−77	473 (-3)	2
12	Posušje	Posušje	12	386	131	80	175	421	555	−134	473	5
13	Travnik	Travnik	12	360	122	64	174	422	538	−116	430	5
14	Olimpik	Sarajevo	9	275	100	67	108	309	333	−24	367	5
15	Modriča	Modriča	7	210	87	34	89	298	290	+8	295	1
16	Orašje	Orašje	7	218	85	33	100	307	325	−18	288	7
17	Zvijezda	Gradačac	7	210	70	49	91	248	304	−56	259	7
18	Rudar (P)	Prijedor	8	249	64	65	120	238	341	−103	257	10
19	Tuzla City	Tuzla	6	187	64	48	75	232	259	−27	240	2
20	Žepče	Žepče	6	188	62	32	94	192	274	−82	218	8
21	Mladost (DK)	Doboj, Kakanj	6	182	53	50	79	196	265	−69	209	6
22	GOŠK	Gabela	6	191	45	46	100	176	315	−139	181	7
23	Jedinstvo	Bihać	4	128	53	14	61	171	203	−32	173	7
24	**Sloga**	Doboj	4	135	44	25	66	133	196	−63	157	6
25	Vitez	Vitez	5	154	39	34	81	126	210	−84	151	9
26	Krupa	Krupa na Vrbasu	4	130	37	36	57	141	170	−29	147	4
27	Budućnost	Banovići	4	128	39	21	68	139	199	−60	138	8
28	Laktaši	Laktaši	3	90	35	14	41	122	125	−3	119	8
29	Rudar (U)	Ugljevik	3	98	34	14	50	118	143	−25	116	9
30	Igman	Konjic	3	99	26	21	52	112	181	−69	99	8
31	Glasinac	Sokolac	2	68	25	10	33	71	103	−32	85	14
32	Drina	Zvornik	3	90	20	12	58	68	159	−91	72	13
33	Brotnjo	Čitluk	2	68	19	14	35	76	114	−38	71	13
34	Kozara	Gradiška	2	68	19	13	36	74	107	−33	70	15
35	Zvijezda 09	Ugljevik	3	88	16	19	53	78	168	−90	67	9
36	Mladost (VO)	Velika Obarska	2	60	14	17	29	42	82	−40	59	11
37	Mladost (G)	Gacko	1	38	11	6	21	40	65	−25	39	18
38	Metalleghe	Jajce	1	32	7	11	14	25	34	−9	32	11
39	Bosna	Visoko	1	38	4	1	33	28	107	−79	13	20
40	Gradina	Srebrenik	1	30	1	6	23	17	57	−40	9	16

2026–27 Bosnian Premier League teams
2026–27 First League of FBiH or 2026–27 First League of RS teams
2026–27 third or lower degree of competition teams
Defunct teams

^{1} In the 2004–05 season, Borac were deducted 1 point (Slavija were awarded 3–0 vs Borac in week 11).
^{2} In the 2006–07 season, Zrinjski were deducted 1 point (Orašje were awarded 3–0 vs Zrinjski).
^{3} In the 2013–14 season, Slavija were deducted 3 points.
^{4} In the 2019–20 season, Čelik were deducted 3 points (Željezničar were awarded 3–0 vs Čelik).
^{5} In the 2021–22 season, Velež were deducted 3 points (Borac were awarded 3–0 vs Velež).
^{6} In the 2023–24 season, Sarajevo were deducted 3 points.
^{7} In the 2024–25 season, Sloboda were deducted 3 points (Posušje were awarded 3–0 vs Sloboda).

== See also ==
- Bosnia and Herzegovina Football Cup
- Supercup of Bosnia and Herzegovina
