= Krupa na Vrbasu =

Krupa na Vrbasu Крупа на Врбасу (Serbian)
- Village (Selo)
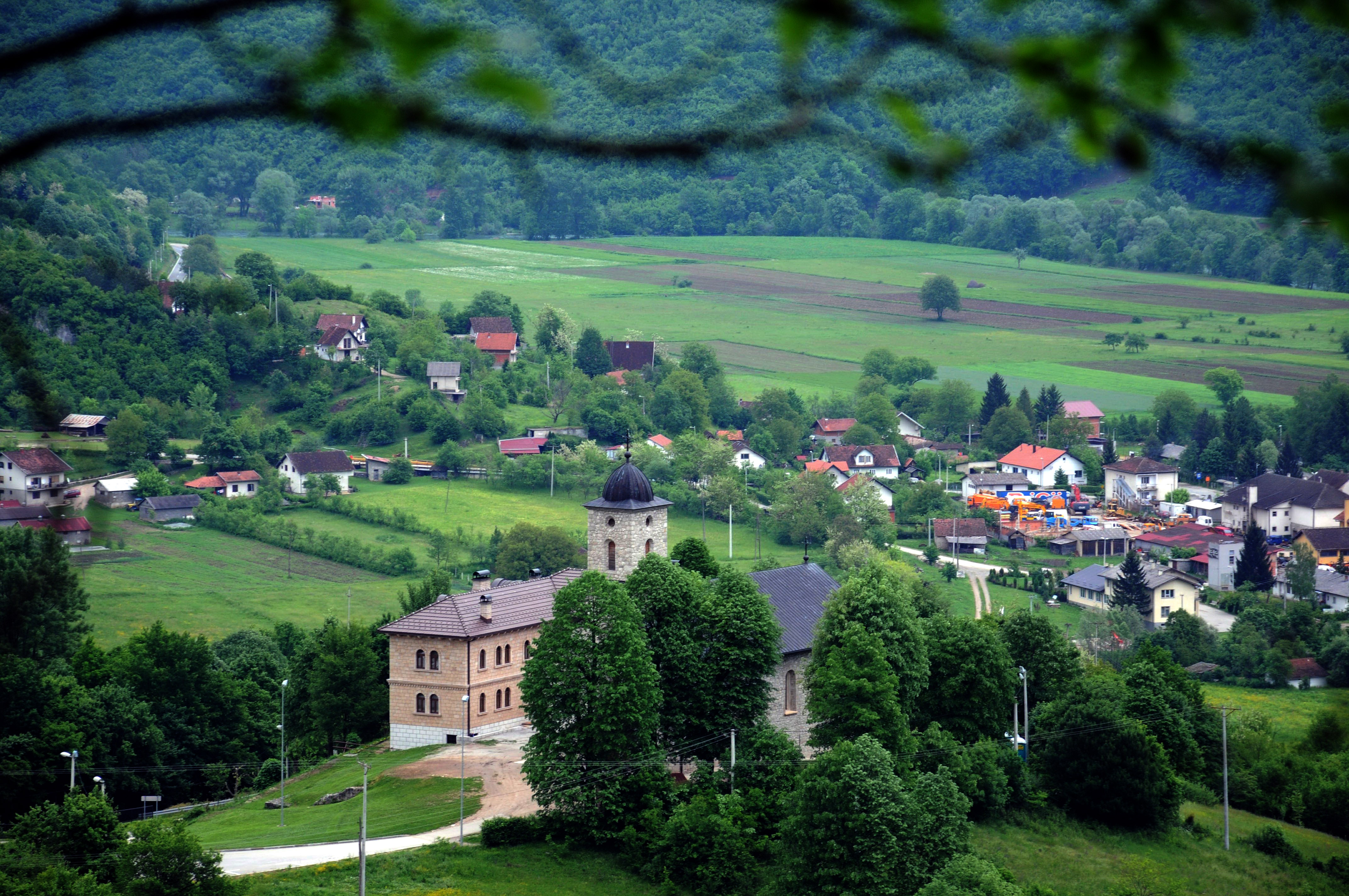
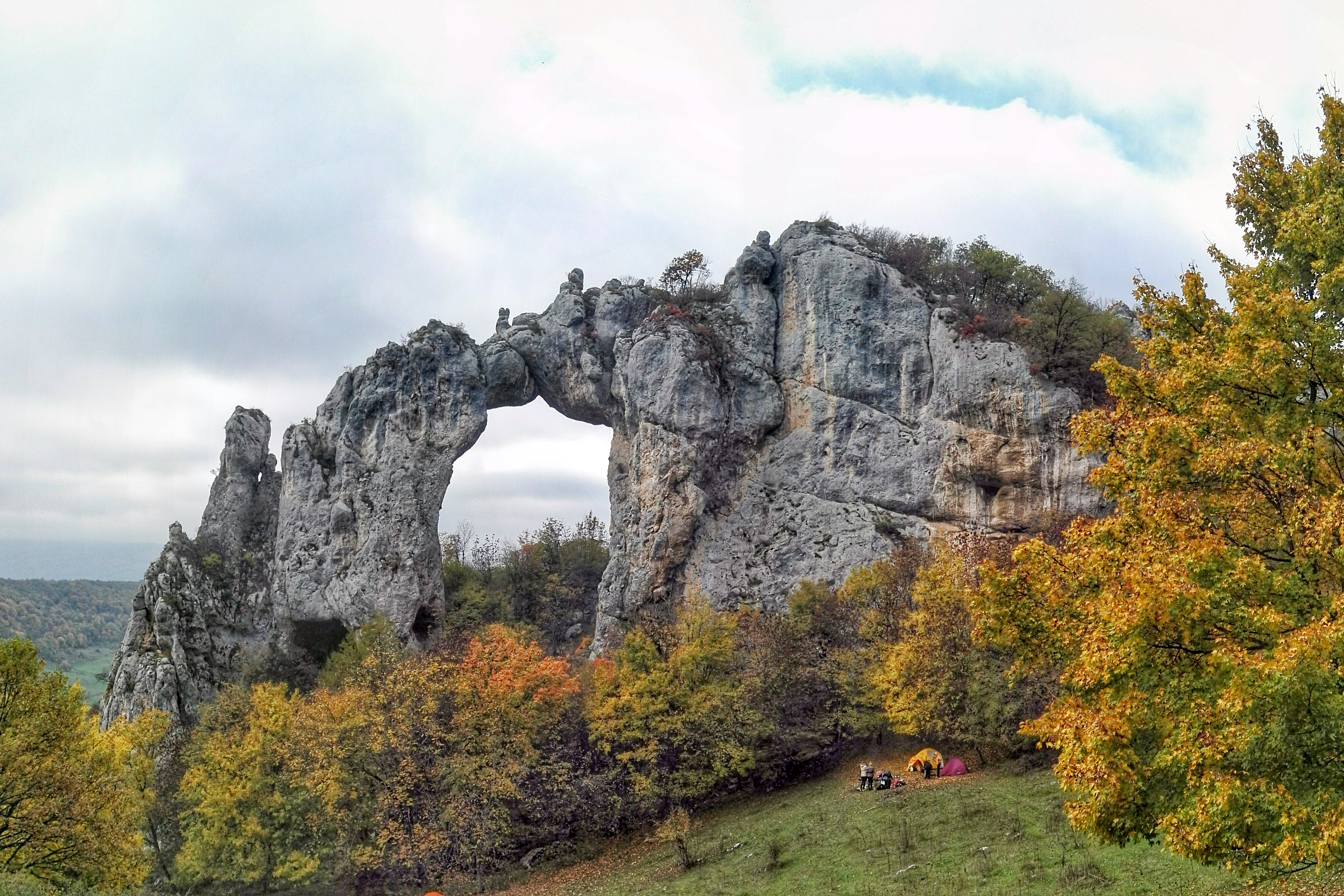
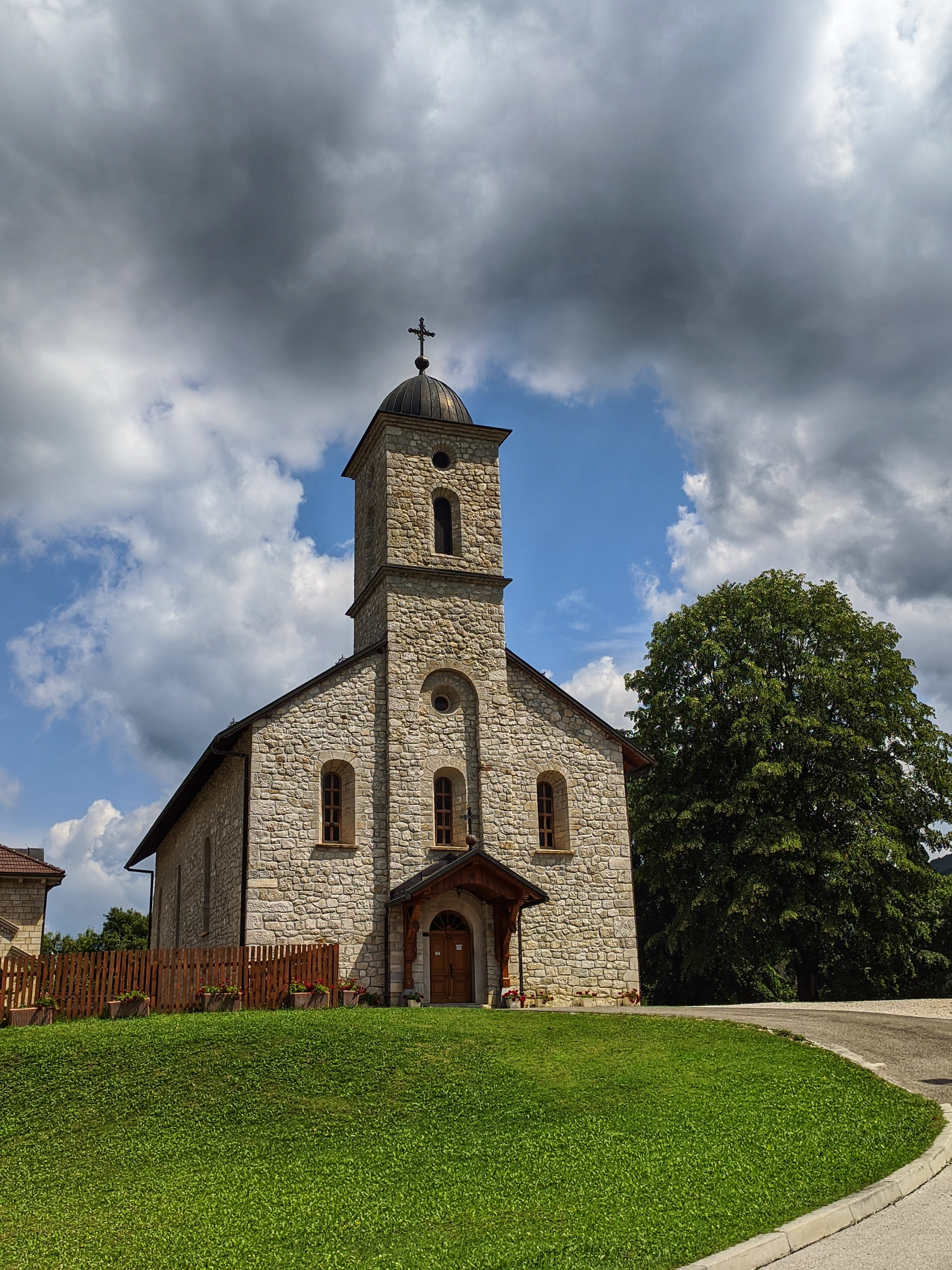
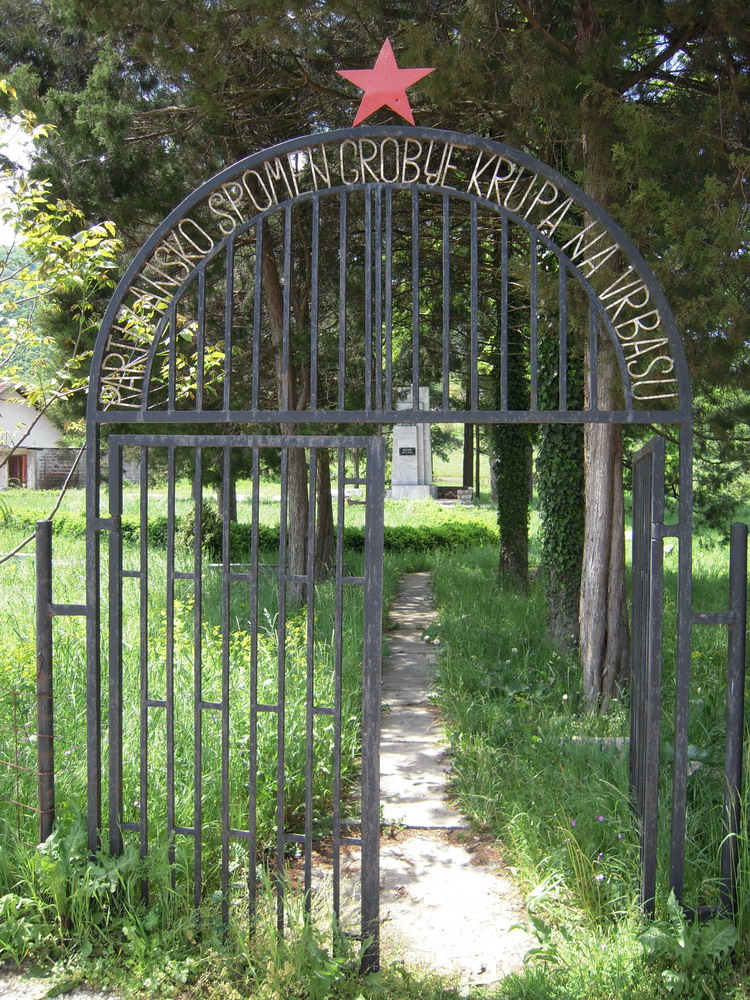
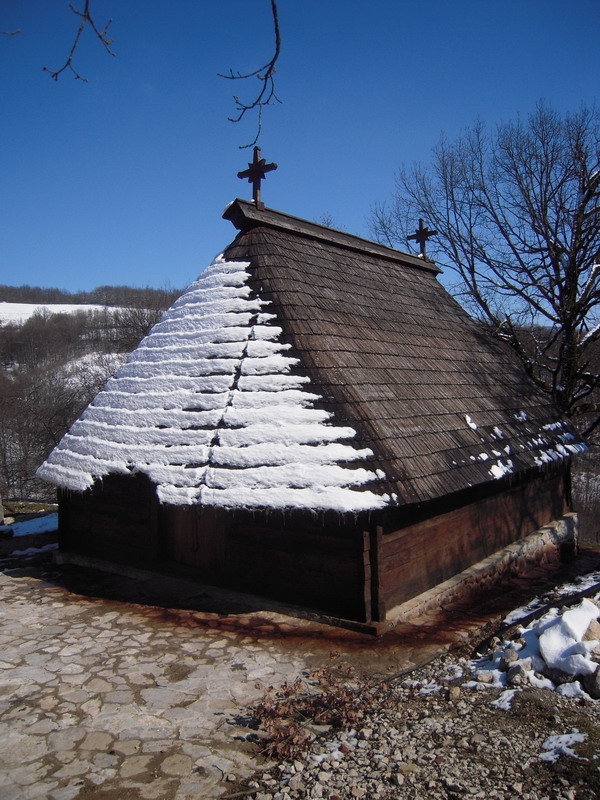
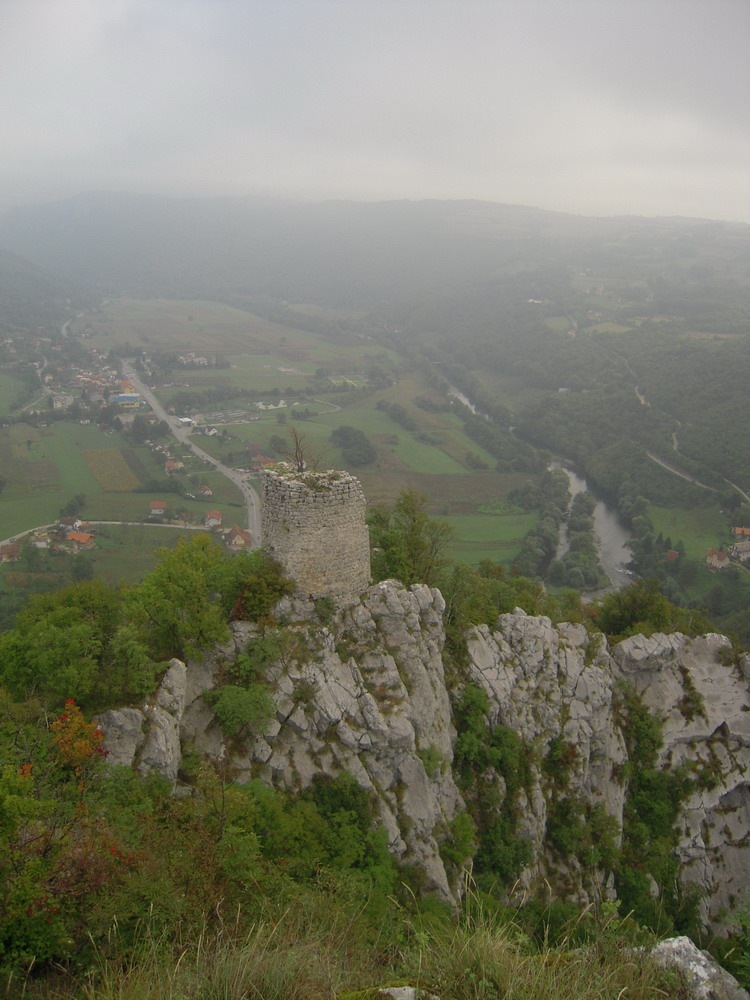
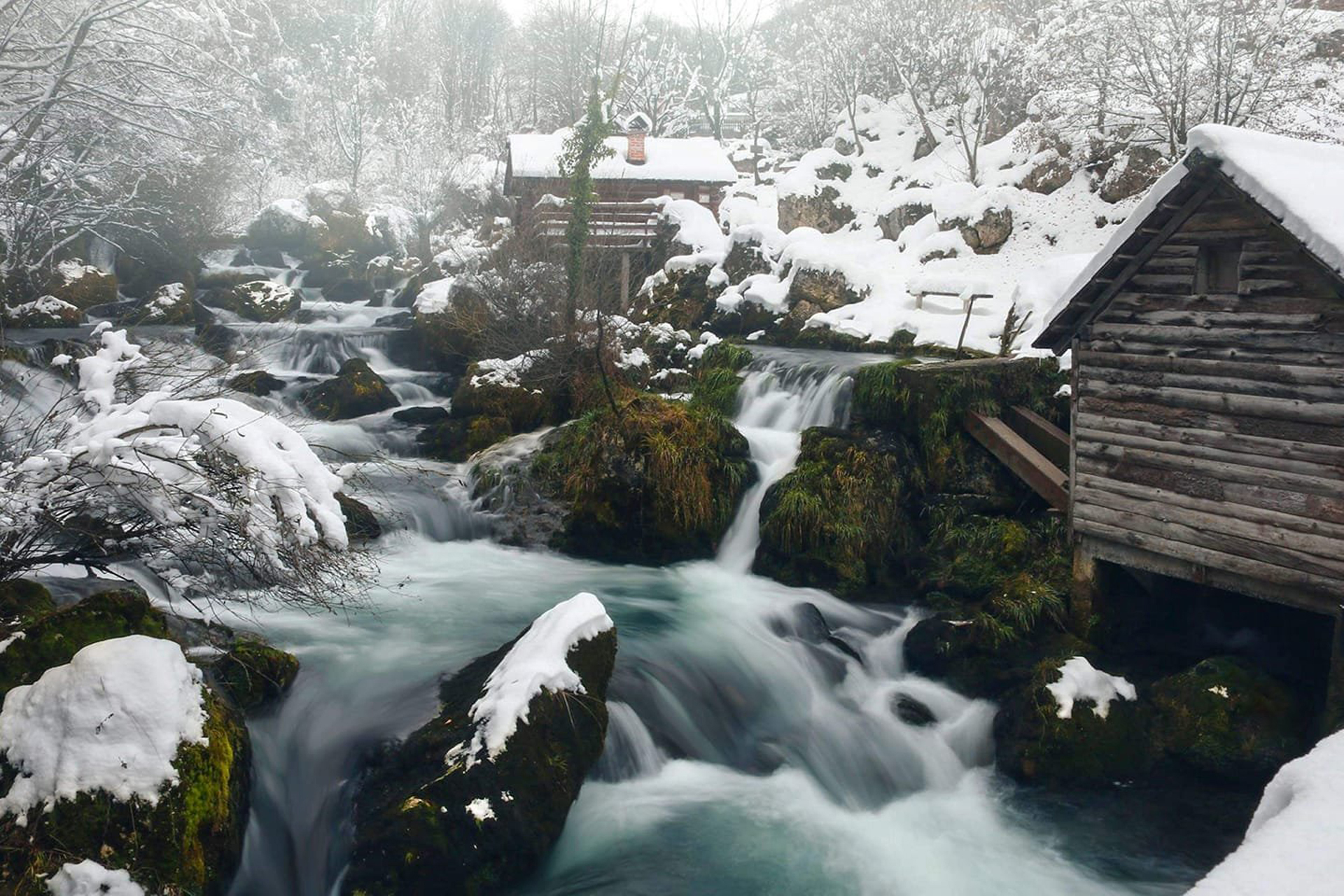
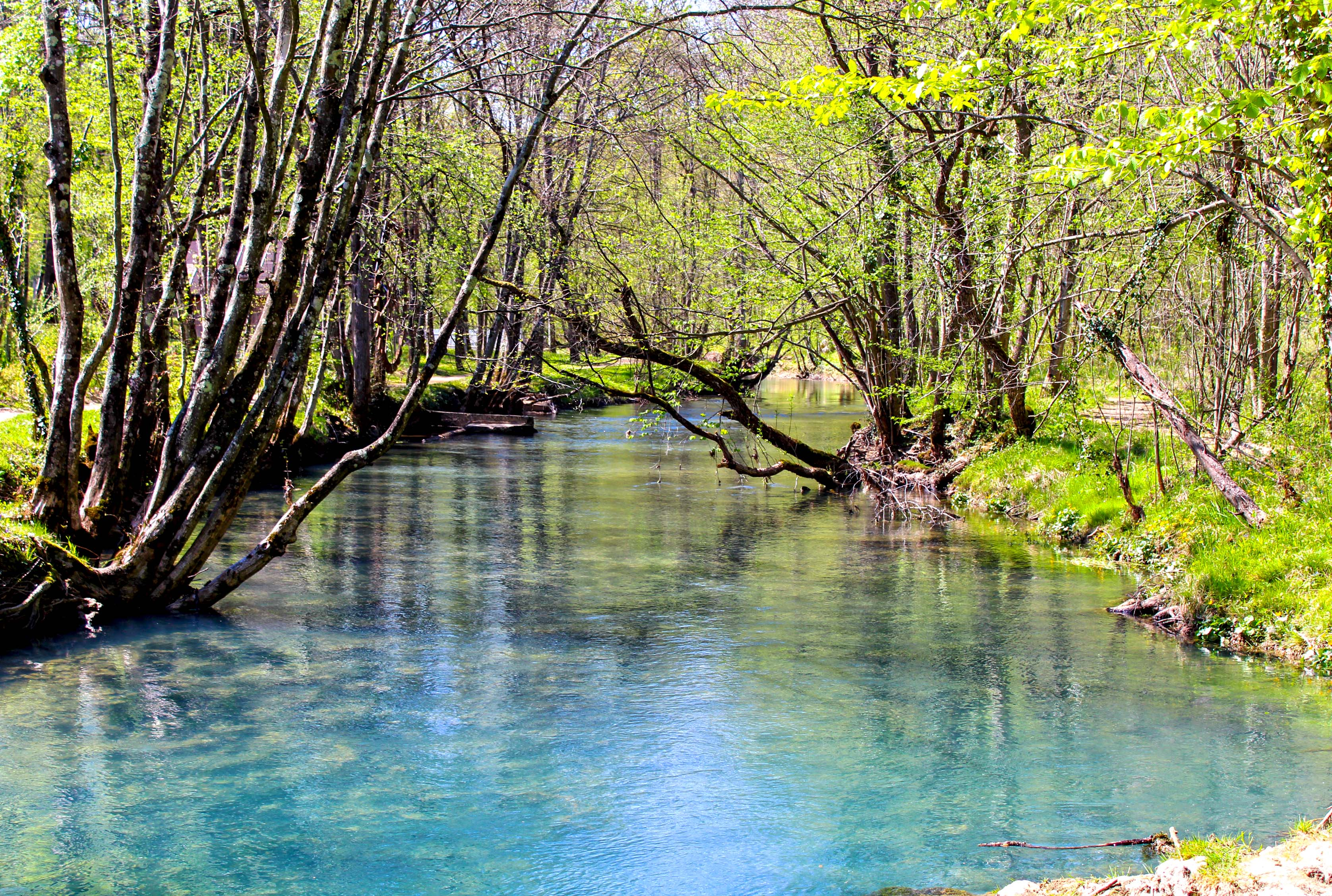

- Location within Bosnia and Herzegovina
- Coordinates: 44°37′N 17°09′E
- Country: Bosnia and Herzegovina
- Entity: Republika Srpska
- Municipality: Banja Luka

Population (2013)
  - Total: 1,257
- Time zone: UTC+1 (CET)
  - Summer (DST): UTC+2 (CEST)

Krupa na Vrbasu (Serbian Cyrillic: Крупа на Врбасу) is a village by the river Vrbas in the municipality of Banja Luka, Republika Srpska, Bosnia and Herzegovina.

== Sport ==
- FK Krupa - football club.
