= FK Krupa =

Krupa
- Full name: Fudbalski klub Krupa
- Founded: 1983; 43 years ago
- Ground: City Stadium, Krupa na Vrbasu, Bosnia and Herzegovina
- Capacity: 3,500
- Chairman: Draško Ilić
- 2022–23: First League of RS, 1st
- Website: https://fkkrupa.net/
Home colours	Away colours

Fudbalski klub Krupa (Serbian Cyrillic: Фудбалски клуб Крупа) is a professional football club from the town of Krupa na Vrbasu, Republika Srpska, Bosnia and Herzegovina.

The club plays its home games on the Krupa na Vrbasu City Stadium, which has a capacity of 3,500 seats.

== History ==
In the 2013–14 Second League of Republika Srpska season play-off, Krupa got an appearance in the First League of the Republika Srpska for the season 2014–15. After only two years playing in the 2nd tier and after the season 2015–16, the team got promoted for the first time in its history to the Premier League of Bosnia and Herzegovina.

In the 2017–18 Bosnian Cup, Krupa, led by manager Slobodan Starčević, got to the cup final losing to Željezničar in two matches (2–0 at Sarajevo and 2–4 at Krupa na Vrbasu), thus finishing as runners-up.

In the 2018–19 Bosnian Premier League season, Krupa finished on 11th place and it got relegated back to the First League of RS. Then, in the 2019–20 First League of RS season, the club secured promotion back to the Premier League, though after the season was ended abruptly due to the COVID-19 pandemic in Bosnia and Herzegovina, and by default Krupa finished in 1st place and got promoted.

In the 2020–21 Premier League season, Krupa initially avoided relegation to the First League of RS, but were then relegated back to the league due to failing to obtain a license for the Premier League.

== Honours ==
=== Domestic ===
==== League ====
- First League of the Republika Srpska:
  - Winners (4): 2015–16, 2019–20, 2021–22, 2022–23
  - Runners-up (1): 2014–15
- Second League of the Republika Srpska:
  - Winners (1): 2013–14 (west)
- Regional League Banja Luka: (Bosnian fifth level)
  - Winners (1): 2011–12

==== Cups ====
- Bosnia and Herzegovina Cup:
  - Runners-up (1): 2017–18
- Republika Srpska Cup:
  - Runners-up (3): 2014–15, 2017–18, 2018–19

== Personnel ==
=== Coaching staff ===
Current technical staff
- Manager: Vacant
- Assistant manager: (Bosnia and Herzegovina) Miroslav Balaban
- Assistant manager: (Bosnia and Herzegovina) Nebojša Anđelić
- Goalkeeping coach: (Bosnia and Herzegovina) Vladimir Damjanić
- Fitness coach: (Bosnia and Herzegovina) Marko Mazalica
- Doctor: (Bosnia and Herzegovina) Filip Jokić
- Physiotherapist: (Bosnia and Herzegovina) Bjelan Krčmar
- Physiotherapist: (Bosnia and Herzegovina) Marko Miljković

=== Management staff ===
Current management
- President: (Bosnia and Herzegovina) Draško Ilić
- Vice president: (Bosnia and Herzegovina) Dragomir Ilić
- Director: (Bosnia and Herzegovina) Mihajlo Bučinski
- Sporting director: (Bosnia and Herzegovina) Mladen Ilić
- General secretary: (Bosnia and Herzegovina) Siniša Račić
- Board members:
- (Bosnia and Herzegovina) Draško Ilić
- (Bosnia and Herzegovina) Dragomir Ilić
- (Bosnia and Herzegovina) Dragan Ilić

== Managerial history ==
- (Bosnia and Herzegovina) Slobodan Starčević (24 January 2014 – 31 May 2018)
- (Bosnia and Herzegovina) Branislav Krunić (11 June 2018 – 8 October 2018)
- (Serbia) Petar Kurćubić (8 October 2018 – 9 March 2019)
- (Bosnia and Herzegovina) Slobodan Starčević (12 March 2019 – 21 June 2019)
- (Serbia) Zoran Marić (25 June 2019 – 15 September 2020)
- (Bosnia and Herzegovina) Velimir Stojnić (16 September 2020 – 28 October 2020)
- (Bosnia and Herzegovina) Siniša Mrkobrada (interim) (28 October 2020 – 13 December 2020)
- (Bosnia and Herzegovina) Vladimir Ilić (13 December 2020 – 25 June 2023)
