= Football in Bosnia and Herzegovina =

- Country: Bosnia and Herzegovina
- Governing body: Football Association of Bosnia and Herzegovina
- National team: men's national team
- First played: 1903; 123 years ago

National competitions
- FIFA World Cup; UEFA European Championship; UEFA Nations League

Club competitions
- List: League Premijer Liga; Cups Bosnia and Herzegovina Football Cup

International competitions
- FIFA Club World Cup; FIFA Intercontinental Cup; UEFA Champions League; UEFA Europa League; UEFA Conference League; UEFA Super Cup

Association football is the most popular sport in Bosnia and Herzegovina since after gaining independence from Yugoslavia in 1992, in 1995 they played their first international game against Albania, but they made the debut at the 2014 FIFA World Cup in Brazil, their first ever appearance in the tournament.

It is governed by the Football Association of Bosnia and Herzegovina governing body in country, the national team has never qualified for the UEFA European Championship after failing at the play-offs by three teams. The football governing body has the Bosnian Premier League, Bosnian Cup and also the Bosnian Supercup. The teams also make the European international competitions like UEFA Champions League, UEFA Europa League and also the new UEFA Europa Conference League tournament.

== National team of Bosnia and Herzegovina ==
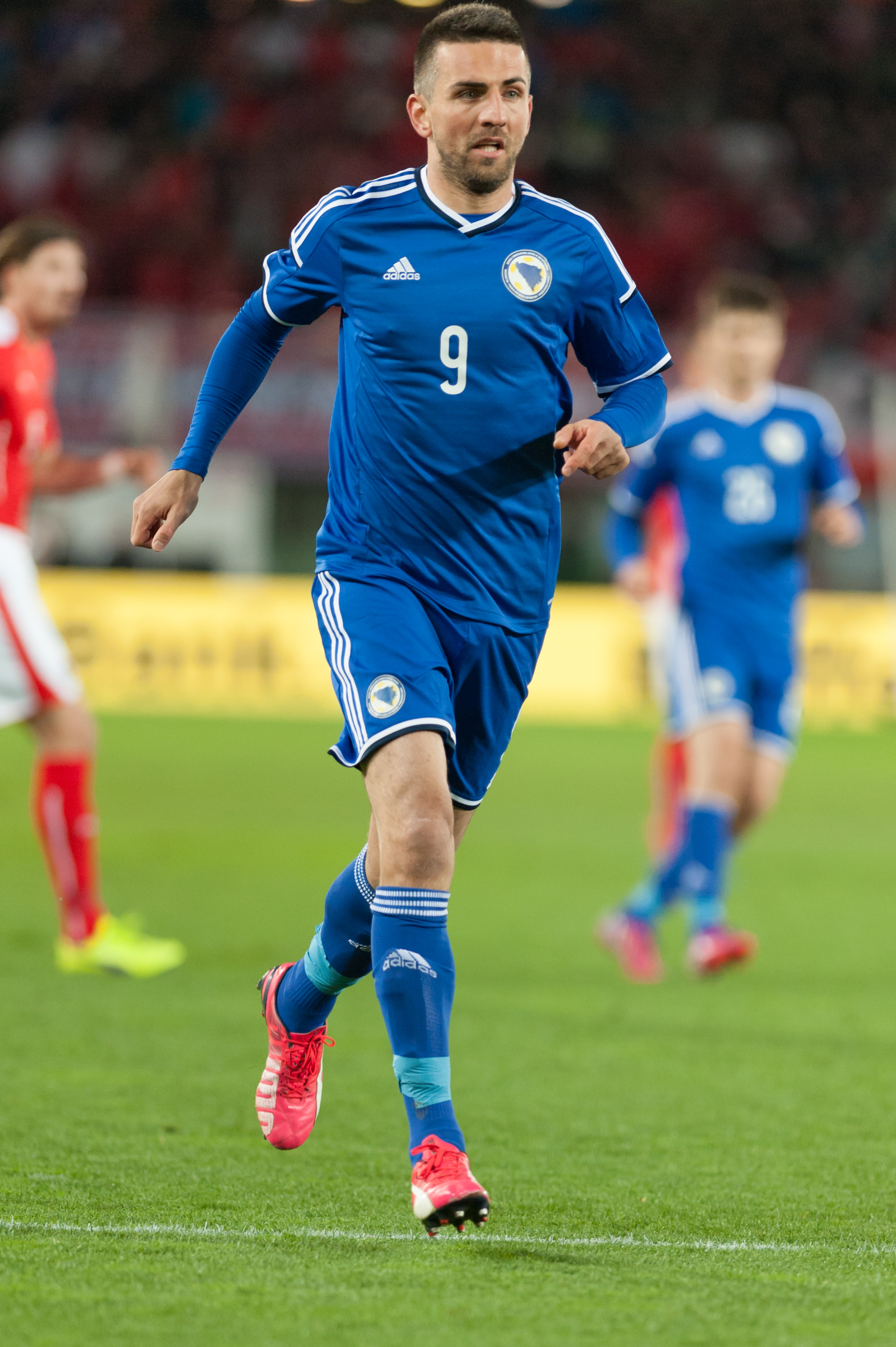
Vedad Ibišević scored Bosnia's first ever FIFA World Cup goal in a 2–1 loss to Argentina.

The team has only qualified for a major international tournament twice as an independent nation, reaching the 2014 and 2026 FIFA World Cup. It is yet to qualify for a UEFA European Championship, coming closest by losing to Portugal in the play-offs for UEFA Euro 2012.

Bosnia's home ground is Bilino Polje Stadium in the city of Zenica. The national team's first international victory as a FIFA member came against 1994 FIFA World Cup runners-up Italy on 6 November 1996. The national team's highest FIFA World Ranking was 13th in August 2013. October 2013 FIFA World Rankings, used to seed qualified teams in the 2014 FIFA World Cup Final Draw, placed Bosnia and Herzegovina as the highest ranked team of all former Yugoslav Republics for the first time in history. In the past years, the national side finished twice among the top three best movers in FIFA World Ranking of the year. In their first game at their first World Cup, centre-forward Vedad Ibišević scored Bosnia's first ever goal at a major tournament in the country's history in a 1–2 loss to two-time World Cup winning opposition Argentina.

Bilino Polje the stadium of the Bosnia national football team

== History of club competitions ==
The game reached Bosnia and Herzegovina at the start of the 20th century, with Sarajevo (in 1903) and Mostar (in 1905) being the first cities to embrace it. Banja Luka, Tuzla, Zenica and Bihać were next along with numerous smaller towns as the sport spread. The country was under Austro-Hungarian rule when official competition began in 1908, though these activities were on a small scale within each territory. At the outbreak of World War I, there were four clubs in Sarajevo; Hrvatski ŠK, Srpski ŠK, Muslimanski ŠK and Židovski ŠK. and approximately 20 outside the capital. The creation of the Kingdom of Yugoslavia post 1918 brought an increase in the number of leagues, and soon a domestic national championship was organised. The Yugoslav football league system was based in numerous subassociations which served as competitions which determined the local representants of the subassociations in the national final stage, the Yugoslav championship. In 1920, the Sarajevo football subassociation was founded which included besides Sarajevo and its outskirts, also most of eastern Bosnia and western Serbia. The Banja Luka football subassociation included most of the western Bosnia and an area usually known as Krajina, while the Podrinje region souranding city of Bijeljina was part of the provincial leagues of the Belgrade football subassociation. The unified Yugoslav championship ran until the start of Secomd World War with 1939/40 season having been the last to have been completed. In this period 3 clubs from modern-day territory of Bosnia and Herzegovina managed to qualify for the final stages of the Yugoslav championships, SAŠK and Slavija, both from Sarajevo, and Krajišnik from Banja Luka. Many local players became targets of dominating teams and had successful careers such as Florijan Matekalo, Petar Manola, Milan Rajlić, Stanko Zagorac, Aleksandar Mastela or Branko Stanković.

The Football Federation of Bosnia and Herzegovina was founded after the Second World War, as the subdivision of the Yugoslav Football Association. The new communist authorities abolished the former league sistem and disbanded numerous clubs while created others. The era from 1945 till 1992 can be marked by the emergence of a highly competitive and quality league, characterized by the appearance of a chronical "Big 4" contenders for the title (Red Star, Partizan, Hajduk and Dinamo Zagreb) but with a particularity that highlights Bosnian football which is that their clubs were always present in the First League and FK Sarajevo, and Željezničar even won championships and created one of the most intense outsiders derbies at time, the Sarajevo derby.

== Club football ==
Bosnia and Herzegovina's best sides at the time of former Yugoslavia were Sarajevo, Željezničar (Sarajevo) and Velež (Mostar) which played in the Yugoslavian first league, second league and cup competitions with moderate success, while its best players with the likes of Vahid Halilhodžić, Safet Sušić, Josip Katalinski, Faruk Hadžibegić, Ivica Osim, Asim Ferhatović, Blaž Slišković, Mehmed Baždarević, Dušan Bajević and many others were chosen to represent SFR Yugoslavia national football team.

Other notable clubs that participate in Premier League of Bosnia and Herzegovina are HŠK Zrinjski Mostar, NK Čelik Zenica, NK Široki Brijeg, FK Sloboda Tuzla, as well as FK Borac Banja Luka.

== Football stadiums in Bosnia and Herzegovina ==
Image	Stadium	Capacity	Opened	City / Town	Home team	UEFA Rank.
	Stadion Asim Ferhatović-Hase	37,500	1947	Sarajevo	FK Sarajevo	UEFA
	Stadion Bilino Polje	15,600	1972	Zenica	NK Čelik and Bosnia and Herzegovina	UEFA
	Stadion Grbavica	13,146	1953	Sarajevo	FK Željezničar and Bosnia and Herzegovina	UEFA

== Fans ==
Ultras are common there with the biggest names as Manijaci the supporter group of Željeznicar, Horde zla The supporter group of FK Sarajevo and the BHFanaticos the supporter group of the national side.

== Attendances ==
The average attendance per top-flight football league season and the club with the highest average attendance:

Season	League average	Best club	Best club average
2024–25	2,454	Željezničar	8,376
2023–24	2,461	Željezničar	7,057
2022–23	2,325	Željezničar	6,825
2021–22	—	—	—
2020–21	—	—	—
2019–20	2,623	Željezničar	5,532
2018–19	1,774	Sarajevo	4,294
2017–18	1,793	Željezničar	4,825
2016–17	1,971	Željezničar	6,969
2015–16	1,577	Željezničar	4,500
2014–15	1,517	Sarajevo	6,757
2013–14	1,174	Željezničar	2,800
2012–13	1,345	Željezničar	3,707
2011–12	1,405	Željezničar	5,067
2010–11	1,563	Sarajevo	4,167
2009–10	2,303	Željezničar	7,733
