= Fazlić =

Origin
- Language: Bosnian via Turkish from Arabic
- Meaning: excellent, praiseworthy, generous
- Region of origin: Bosnia and Herzegovina

Other names
- See also: Fazlıoğlu

Fazlić is a Bosnian patronymic surname formed by adding the Slavic diminutive suffix -ić to the masculine given name of Arabic origin Fazli (Arabic: فَضْليّ, derived from the adjective فضيل = excellent, virtuous, deserving) and may refer to:

- Dino Fazlic (born 1991), German footballer
- Husnija Fazlić (1943–2022), Yugoslav former footballer
- Jasmin Fazlić Jala (born 1986), Bosnian rapper
- Jasna Fazlić (born 1970), former Bosnian-American table tennis player
- Kemal Fazlić (born 1995), Bosnian handball player
- Miralem Fazlić (born 1947), Bosnian former footballer
- Salih Fazlić (born 1975), Bosnian volleyball player
- Šuhret Fazlić (born 1961), Bosnian politician
