= Vlado Lemić =

Serbian footballer and agent

Vladica "Vlado" Lemić (born 1966) is a Serbian former football player and current football agent.

Following a career as a professional footballer, Lemić became a player agent where he's presided over or played a part in transfers including with high-profile players Mateja Kezman (DM27 million in 2000), Samuel Eto'o (€28 million in 2001) and Luka Modric (£33 million in 2012).

== Playing career ==
A midfielder, Lemić spent most of his playing career with Borac Banja Luka, competing in the second-tier Yugoslav Second League. Otherwise mostly mediocre and unremarkable by top football standards, the highlight of his time at the club was winning the 1987–88 Yugoslav Cup. The famous final on 11 May 1988 at Belgrade's Marakana pitted the heavy underdog Banja Luka side against powerhouse Red Star Belgrade. Sensationally, Borac ended up winning 1–0, the first and only time Yugoslav Cup was won by a team outside the top-tier First Federal League. Lemić only appeared in the closing two minutes of the contest plus injury time as head coach Husnija Fazlić brought him on as substitute for the match's only goalscorer Senad Lupić.

As a result of the Cup win exposure, Lemić earned a transfer to the Belgian lower league club KFC Herentals.

Later, Lemić joined the Belgian top league side Lierse S.K. for a season, playing under head coach Eric Gerets.

== Football agent ==
=== PSV connection 1999–2008 ===
In 1999, a few years removed from his playing days, thirty-three-year-old upstart football agent Lemić got involved with PSV via his former Lierse coach Eric Gerets who had just become head coach of the Eindhoven club. Furthermore, Lemić's association with PSV was also facilitated by compatriot Ranko Stojić, a somewhat more seasoned Serbian football agent and another previously Gerets-coached former player, was also active on the transfer front for PSV in this period. As Lemić began bringing players into PSV—initially low-profile ones such as Saša Stojanović—the young agent also became close with PSV's sporting director Frank Arnesen.

Lemić's first transfer of note was the twenty-one-year-old Mateja Kežman's move from FK Partizan to Eindhoven during the summer of 2000. The young striker with plenty of positive notices from the FR Yugoslavia First League commanded a major price tag as the Dutch club was said to have paid DM27 million for his services. As the forward became an immediate scoring hit at Eindhoven, leading the Boeren to the Eredivisie title and becoming league top scorer in his first season with the club, the agent was simultaneously launched into a position of influence within PSV.

After Arnesen left in 2004, Lemić built a good relationship with his successor at the PSV sporting director post Stan Valckx, allowing the agent to remain an influential figure inside the club. Through Lemić's network of connections such as his South America-based agent brother Zoran, the club was able to get their hands on many acquisitions from that part of the world, the most famous of which were Brazilian goalkeeper Heurelho Gomes, Peruvian winger Jefferson Farfán, and talented young striker Jonathan Reis. Additionally, Lemić engineered an agreement between Chelsea and PSV for Chelsea signings to be sent to PSV as part of co-sharing or loan deals until becoming eligible for a British work permit. Defenders Alex, Alcides, and Slobodan Rajković arrived to the Dutch club in this manner. Lemić's style at PSV was reportedly very hands-on as he could be regularly seen with players at the club's training complex De Herdgang. He also kept close contact with the club's head coaches in this period: first Guus Hiddink followed by Ronald Koeman while additionally fostering contacts with the Chelsea organization through Piet de Visser and Frank Arnesen, which allowed Lemić to reportedly become close with the English club's owner Roman Abramovich.

Despite PSV having had plenty of success on the pitch as well as maintaining healthy cash flow financially all throughout this period, Lemić's large influence in Eindhoven came under scrutiny of the incoming general manager Jan Reker who took over in July 2007 after PSV had earlier decided, in March 2007, to abolish the chairman position and replace it with the general manager post. Though Lemić and Reker reportedly never got on from day one, the initial trigger for their feud seems to have been the issue over PSV's Ecuadorian midfielder and Lemić's client Édison Méndez who in December 2007 requested a transfer out of the club, reportedly wishing to be home in Ecuador closer to his ill mother. The club unwillingly obliged, setting a relatively low transfer fee of US$1 million when Barcelona Sporting Club from Santiago de Guayaquil expressed interest. However, the fee was still too high for the Ecuadorian club and the deal fell through. One month later, in January 2008, an offer from a Mexican club willing to pay the million for Méndez came in, however, Reker killed it by informing them that million dollars was a 'friendly fee' for Ecuadorian clubs while the Mexicans would have to pay a higher one. Méndez's agent Lemić protested and the situation exploded on 30 January 2008 after PSV's league De Topper win over Ajax.

Though things quickly appeared to have settled on surface, the situation festered behind the scenes for months as PSV was in a league title race while Lemić's influence within the club was simultaneously publicly questioned courtesy of information leaked by the Reker camp to the press. Lemić didn't hold back either as his client Heurelho Gomes' stinging attack on Reker in a Voetbal International interview—conducted just days after the title got clinched on 20 April 2008—was seen by many to be the agent's revenge by proxy. The Reker-controlled club management and supervisory boards reacted in a harshly worded statement posted on the club's official website, condemning Gomes' action. Appalled by the situation and irritated by Reker, seventy-three-year-old scout Piet de Visser resigned his post and left the club within a week.

By the summer 2008 off-season, the agent and the PSV general manager were engaged in a full blown public war. Much information that normally would have stayed behind closed doors was now being revealed as Reker moved to rid the club of any Lemić influence. Influenced by Reker, the club alleged that Lemić and Valckx pocketed profits from their deals for PSV. When a transfer was made at the club, Lemić would allegedly send a hefty bill to the PSV office, even when no one was aware of his involvement. He reportedly claimed services rendered like 'cooling off the interest of club X in player Y' to keep transfer prices down or making a supposed bid by a foreign club for a PSV-player fade away. Meanwhile, following an investigation by the NRC Handelsblad reporters, it also came out that technical director Valckx's contract with PSV, in addition to his salary terms, contained a stipulation earning him five per cent of every outgoing transfer at the club—a provision apparently signed off on by the former club chairman Harry van Raaij without the knowledge of the club's supervisory board. Though no wrongdoing was ever proven, Lemić got banned from the club's training ground while Valckx got fired.

Reker thus decisively won the war for the control of PSV, however, in eliminating Lemić and his allies within PSV, the general manager also eliminated the agent's vast network of contacts. Additionally, in direct response to Lemić's ban, his clients Gomes, Farfan, Alcides, and Rajković left the club shortly.

A period of struggle commenced for PSV from 2008 both on and off the pitch—having dominated Dutch football in the 2000s with seven league titles along with a Champions League semifinal appearance, it took the club seven years to win its next Eredivisie title. After playing in the 2008-09 Champions League and getting eliminated by Christmas with only one win in six group-stage matches, it wasn't until 2015-16 that PSV returned to the group stage of the top European club competition.

=== Other dealings ===
Over the years, Lemić developed a business relationship with Real Madrid football director Predrag Mijatović and was instrumental in the €14 million transfer of Royston Drenthe from Feyenoord to Real in August 2007 as well as in the €27 million transfer that saw Klaas-Jan Huntelaar go from Ajax to Madrid in January 2009.

In May 2008, Lemić's services were enlisted by Chelsea's Roman Abramovich in the club's search for new manager following the dismissal of Avram Grant. Lemić was said to have played an important role in setting up contacts with AC Milan's Carlo Ancelotti and AS Roma's Luciano Spalletti, however the job ultimately went to Luiz Felipe Scolari.

After getting banned from PSV, Lemić intensified his dealings with Chelsea's sporting director Arnesen, going on scouting trips with him as well as with Mijatović who went back to being a football agent after getting fired from Real following the club's presidential change. After Arnesen left Chelsea organization to go to Hamburger SV, Mijatović got short-listed for the job at Stamford Bridge in large part thanks to Lemić's connections, however the job eventually went to Michael Emenalo. In August 2011, Lemić and Mijatović took part in the negotiations that eventually resulted in Samuel Eto'o transferring from Inter to Anzhi Makhachkala.

The following summer, 2012, Lemić had another busy and successful transfer window. He was reportedly one of the most important behind-the-scenes intermediaries in the months-long transfer saga of Luka Modrić from Tottenham to Real Madrid. After first making a business deal with the sought-after player's primary agent Davor Ćurković, Lemić was able to secure access to individuals from the Real backroom staff (including head coach José Mourinho via the coach's powerful agent Jorge Mendes) through a previously-forged friendship and business relationship with former Real ace Mijatović—all of which ultimately led to £33 million changing hands and Modrić signing on 26 August 2012.

Over the same summer, through his other close business contacts such as Frank Arnesen at Hamburger SV, Lemić was involved in a deal that sent Croatian midfielder Milan Badelj from Dinamo Zagreb to Hamburg for a transfer fee of around £3 million. The deal aroused controversy when Badelj's primary agent Dejan Joksimović accused Hamburg's football director Arnesen of inflating the transfer fee in order to accommodate Lemić's cut as an additional agent involved in the deal. As a result of Joksimović's claims, FIFA announced a possible investigation into Badelj's transfer to determine if any wrongdoing occurred, but nothing ever came of it.

=== Deals brokered ===
Over the years Lemić has been involved in many top football transfers in various capacities:

Date	Player	Previous club	New club	Transfer sum
Summer of 2000	Mateja Kežman	FK Partizan	PSV Eindhoven	DM27 million
Summer of 2004	Jefferson Farfán	Alianza Lima	PSV Eindhoven	€2 million
Summer of 2004	Heurelho Gomes	Cruzeiro EC	PSV Eindhoven	unknown
Summer of 2004	Alex Rodrigo Dias da Costa	Santos FC	PSV Eindhoven	co-ownership deal with Chelsea F.C. with a €1 million buyout clause
Summer of 2004	Arjen Robben	PSV Eindhoven	Chelsea FC	£12.1 million
Summer of 2004	Mateja Kežman	PSV Eindhoven	Chelsea FC	£5.4 million
Summer of 2007	Jonathan Reis	Atlético Mineiro	PSV Eindhoven	unknown
Summer of 2007	Royston Drenthe	Feyenoord	Real Madrid	€14 million
January 2008	Branislav Ivanović	Lokomotiv Moskva	Chelsea FC	£9.7 million
Summer of 2008	Heurelho Gomes	PSV Eindhoven	Tottenham Hotspur	£7.8 million
Summer of 2008	Miralem Sulejmani	SC Heerenveen	Ajax	€16.25 million
January 2009	Klaas-Jan Huntelaar	Ajax	Real Madrid	€27 million
Summer of 2011	Samuel Eto'o	Internazionale	Anzhi Makhachkala	€28 million
Summer of 2012	Milan Badelj	Dinamo Zagreb	Hamburger SV	€3.5 million
Summer of 2012	Luka Modrić	Tottenham Hotspur	Real Madrid	£33 million
Summer of 2018	Šime Vrsaljko	Atlético Madrid	Inter Milan	1-year loan with option to buy
Summer of 2018	Mateo Kovačić	Real Madrid	Chelsea FC	1-year loan

== Personal ==
Lemić was born in Zagreb, at the time in the SR Croatia, SFR Yugoslavia.

Lemić is primarily based out of Herenthout, a town in the Belgian part of the Campine region.

He also owns a large vacation property outside of Banja Luka, featuring a cow and mangalitsa farm, in addition to a mansion reportedly equipped with a number of large LCD screens that Lemić uses to scout young footballers as prospective clients.
