= Goran Đukić =

Bosnian footballer

Personal information
- Full name: Goran Đukić
- Date of birth: 6 November 1970 (age 55)
- Place of birth: Banja Luka, SR Bosnia and Herzegovina, SFR Yugoslavia
- Height: 1.84 m (6 ft 0 in)
- Position: Defender

Youth career
- Borac Banja Luka

Senior career*
Years	Team	Apps	(Gls)
1991–1993	Borac Banja Luka	42+	(0+)
1994–1998	Hajduk Kula	143	(1)
1999–2001	Milicionar	41+	(3+)
2001–2003	Red Star Belgrade	4	(1)
2002–2003	→ SV Wörgl (loan)	21	(0)
2003–2005	Borac Banja Luka	46	(1)
Total		297+	(6+)
- * Club domestic league appearances and goals

Goran Đukić (Serbian Cyrillic: Горан Ђукић; born 6 November 1970) is a Bosnian former professional footballer who played as a defender.

== Career ==
Đukić won the Mitropa Cup with Borac Banja Luka in 1992. He went to Hajduk Kula during the 1994 winter transfer window and spent the next five years with the club, making nearly 150 appearances in the First League of FR Yugoslavia. In the 1999 winter transfer window, Đukić switched to fellow First League side Milicionar. He spent two-and-a-half seasons there before the club folded in 2001. Subsequently, Đukić signed with Red Star Belgrade. He was loaned to SV Wörgl for the 2002–03 season. In 2003, Đukić returned to his parent club Borac Banja Luka.

== Career statistics ==
Club	Season	League	
Club	Season	Apps	Goals
Borac Banja Luka	1991–92	14	0
Borac Banja Luka	1992–93	28	0
Borac Banja Luka	1993–94		
Borac Banja Luka	Total	42	0
Hajduk Kula	1993–94	17	1
Hajduk Kula	1994–95	29	0
Hajduk Kula	1995–96	26	0
Hajduk Kula	1996–97	30	0
Hajduk Kula	1997–98	25	0
Hajduk Kula	1998–99	16	0
Hajduk Kula	Total	143	1
Milicionar	1998–99	6	0
Milicionar	1999–2000	35	3
Milicionar	2000–01		
Milicionar	Total	41	3
Red Star Belgrade	2001–02	4	1
SV Wörgl	2002–03	21	0
Borac Banja Luka	2003–04	19	0
Borac Banja Luka	2004–05	27	1
Borac Banja Luka	Total	46	1
Career total		297	6

== Honours ==
Borac Banja Luka

- Mitropa Cup: 1992

Red Star Belgrade

- FR Yugoslavia Cup: 2001–02
