= Mataja =

Mataja is a surname. Notable people with the surname include:

- Branko Mataja (1923–2000), Serbian-American guitarist
- Heinrich Mataja (1877–1937), Austrian lawyer and politician
- Mario Mataja (born 1967), Bosnian-Herzegovinian footballer
