= 1987–88 Yugoslav Cup =

Football competition in SFR Yugoslavia

1987–88 Yugoslav Football Cup
40th Marshal Tito Cup

Tournament details
- Country: Yugoslavia
- Teams: 5,888 (preliminaries); 32 (final rounds)

Final positions
- Champions: Borac Banja Luka (1st title)
- Runners-up: Red Star Belgrade

Tournament statistics
- Matches played: 45

The 1987–88 Yugoslav Cup was the 40th season of the top football knockout competition in SFR Yugoslavia, the Yugoslav Cup (Serbo-Croatian: Kup Jugoslavije), also known as the "Marshal Tito Cup" (Kup Maršala Tita), since its establishment in 1946.

FK Borac Banja Luka beat FK Crvena Zvezda in the final 1-0.

== Calendar ==
The Yugoslav Cup was a tournament for which clubs from all tiers of the football pyramid were eligible to enter. In addition, amateur teams put together by individual Yugoslav People's Army garrisons and various factories and industrial plants were also encouraged to enter, which meant that each cup edition could have several thousands of teams in its preliminary stages. These teams would play through a number of qualifying rounds before reaching the first round proper, in which they would be paired with top-flight teams.

The cup final was played on 11 May.

Round	Legs	Dates played	Fixtures	Clubs
First round (round of 32)	Single	13 August 1987	16	32 → 16
Second round (round of 16)	Double	19 August and 9 September 1987	16	16 → 8
Quarter-finals	Double	18 November and 9 December 1987	8	8 → 4
Semi-finals	Double	16 March and 13 April 1988	4	4 → 2
Final	Single	11 May 1988	1	2 → 1

== First round ==
In the following tables winning teams are marked in bold; teams from outside top level are marked in italic script.

Tie no	Home team	Score	Away team
1	Belišće	1–1 (3–5 p)	**Red Star**
2	**Borac Banja Luka**	1–1 (3–2 p)	Osijek
3	**Borac Čačak**	1–0	Rijeka
4	Dinamo Vinkovci	2–3	**Sarajevo**
5	**Iskra Bugojno**	0–0 (4–3 p)	Partizan
6	Jedinstvo Bijelo Polje	0–1	**Željezničar Sarajevo**
7	Lučki Radnik Rijeka	0–2	**Hajduk Split**
8	**Mladost Petrinja**	1–0	Sutjeska Nikšić
9	Olimpija Ljubljana	1–4	**Čelik Zenica**
10	Rabotnički	1–2	**Budućnost Titograd**
11	Radnički Kragujevac	0–3	**Prishtina**
12	**Radnički Niš**	2–1	Proleter Zrenjanin
13	**Spartak Subotica**	1–1 (3–2 p)	Dinamo Zagreb
14	**Velež**	3–0	Radnički Pirot
15	Vlaznimi Đakovica	0–2	**Vardar**
16	**Vojvodina**	3–2	Sloboda Tuzla

== Second round ==
Tie no	Team 1	Agg.	Team 2	1st leg	2nd leg
1	Čelik Zenica	3–4	**Radnički Niš**	2–1	1–3
2	Iskra Bugojno	2–4	**Prishtina**	1–1	1–3
3	**Red Star**	2–2 (4–2 p)	Budućnost Titograd	2–0	0–2
4	**Sarajevo**	4–3	Hajduk Split	2–2	2–1
5	Spartak Subotica	2–2 (4–5 p)	**Borac Banja Luka**	1–1	1–1
6	**Velež**	9–4	Borac Čačak	7–1	2–3
7	**Vojvodina**	2–2 (3–1 p)	Mladost Petrinja	2–0	0–2
8	Željezničar Sarajevo	3–6	**Vardar**	3–0	0–6

== Quarter-finals ==
Tie no	Team 1	Agg.	Team 2	1st leg	2nd leg
1	Radnički Niš	0–6	**Red Star**	0–0	0–6
2	**Vardar**	2–1	Sarajevo	2–0	0–1
3	Velež	1–2	**Prishtina**	1–2	0–0
4	Vojvodina	4–6	**Borac Banja Luka**	3–0	1–6

== Semi-finals ==
Tie no	Team 1	Agg.	Team 2	1st leg	2nd leg
1	Prishtina	1–1 (1–4 p)	**Borac Banja Luka**	1–1	0–0
2	**Red Star**	2–1	Vardar	1–0	1–1

== Final ==
11 May 1988

Borac Banja Luka	1–0	Red Star
Lupić 60'	Report

Stadion JNA, Belgrade
Attendance: 25,000
Referee: Blažo Zuber (Bačka Topola)

**Borac**	**Red Star**

GK	1	(Socialist Federal Republic of Yugoslavia) Slobodan Karalić
DF	2	(Socialist Federal Republic of Yugoslavia) Stojan Malbašić
DF	3	(Socialist Federal Republic of Yugoslavia) Mario Mataja
DF	4	(Socialist Federal Republic of Yugoslavia) Milorad Bilbija
DF	5	(Socialist Federal Republic of Yugoslavia) Zvonko Lipovac
MF	6	(Socialist Federal Republic of Yugoslavia) Damir Špica (c)
FW	7	(Socialist Federal Republic of Yugoslavia) Amir Durgutović	(substituted off) 74'
MF	8	(Socialist Federal Republic of Yugoslavia) Božur Matejić
FW	9	(Socialist Federal Republic of Yugoslavia) Suad Beširević
MF	10	(Socialist Federal Republic of Yugoslavia) Nenad Popović
FW	11	(Socialist Federal Republic of Yugoslavia) Senad Lupić	(substituted off) 88'
Substitutes:
DF	12	(Socialist Federal Republic of Yugoslavia) Velimir Stojnić
MF	13	(Socialist Federal Republic of Yugoslavia) Mile Šijaković	(substituted on) 74'
FW	15	(Socialist Federal Republic of Yugoslavia) Vlado Lemić	(substituted on) 88'
Manager:
(Socialist Federal Republic of Yugoslavia) Husnija Fazlić

GK	1	(Socialist Federal Republic of Yugoslavia) Stevan Stojanović
MF	2	(Socialist Federal Republic of Yugoslavia) Goran Milojević
DF	3	(Socialist Federal Republic of Yugoslavia) Slobodan Marović
DF	4	(Socialist Federal Republic of Yugoslavia) Goran Jurić
DF	5	(Socialist Federal Republic of Yugoslavia) Slavko Radovanović
DF	6	(Socialist Federal Republic of Yugoslavia) Miodrag Krivokapić
FW	7	(Socialist Federal Republic of Yugoslavia) Dragiša Binić
MF	8	(Socialist Federal Republic of Yugoslavia) Robert Prosinečki
FW	9	(Socialist Federal Republic of Yugoslavia) Borislav Cvetković
FW	10	(Socialist Federal Republic of Yugoslavia) Dragan Stojković (c)
MF	11	(Socialist Federal Republic of Yugoslavia) Žarko Đurović	(substituted off) 71'
Substitutes:
MF	15	(Socialist Federal Republic of Yugoslavia) Dejan Joksimović	(substituted on) 71'
Manager:
(Socialist Federal Republic of Yugoslavia) Velibor Vasović

== See also ==
- 1987–88 Yugoslav First League
- 1987–88 Yugoslav Second League
