= Vico Zeljković =

Bosnian Serb businessman and football executive (born 1988)

President of the Football Association of Bosnia and Herzegovina
- Incumbent
- Assumed office 16 March 2021
- Preceded by: Elvedin Begić

President of FK Borac Banja Luka
- In office 19 June 2018 – 6 August 2020
- Preceded by: Branko Kovačević
- Succeeded by: Stojan Malbašić

Personal details
- Born: 12 November 1988 (age 37) Bosanska Gradiška, SR Bosnia and Herzegovina, SFR Yugoslavia
- Spouse: Nataša Zeljković
- Children: 3
- Occupation: Football administrator

Vico Zeljković (Serbian Cyrillic: Вицо Зељковић; born 12 November 1988) is a Bosnian Serb businessman and football executive serving as president of the Football Association of Bosnia and Herzegovina since March 2021. He is also president of the Football Association of Republika Srpska.

Zeljković was previously president of FK Borac Banja Luka and worked as a board executive in the Bosnian FA as well.

== Career ==
From 19 June 2018 until 6 August 2020, Zeljković was president of Bosnian Premier League club Borac Banja Luka. He has served as president of the Football Association of Republika Srpska since 24 January 2020.

On 16 March 2021, Zeljković became the new president of the Football Association of Bosnia and Herzegovina. Before becoming president, he was a board executive in the Bosnian FA. Zeljković was re-elected to another four-year term as president of the Bosnian FA in April 2025.

== Personal life ==
Zeljković is the nephew of prominent Bosnian Serb politician Milorad Dodik.

== Controversies ==
In 2016, Zeljković made a Facebook post stating, "We don't need the title because Bosnia is not our country! Republika Srpska! Go, Borac!"
