= Gymnasium Neufeld =

Secondary school in Bern, Switzerland

Coordinates: 46.9592°N 7.4289°E

The Gymnasium Neufeld is a state school in Bern, Canton of Bern, Switzerland. An instruction course leads to the grammar-school general qualification for university entrance. The school is known for its concerts.

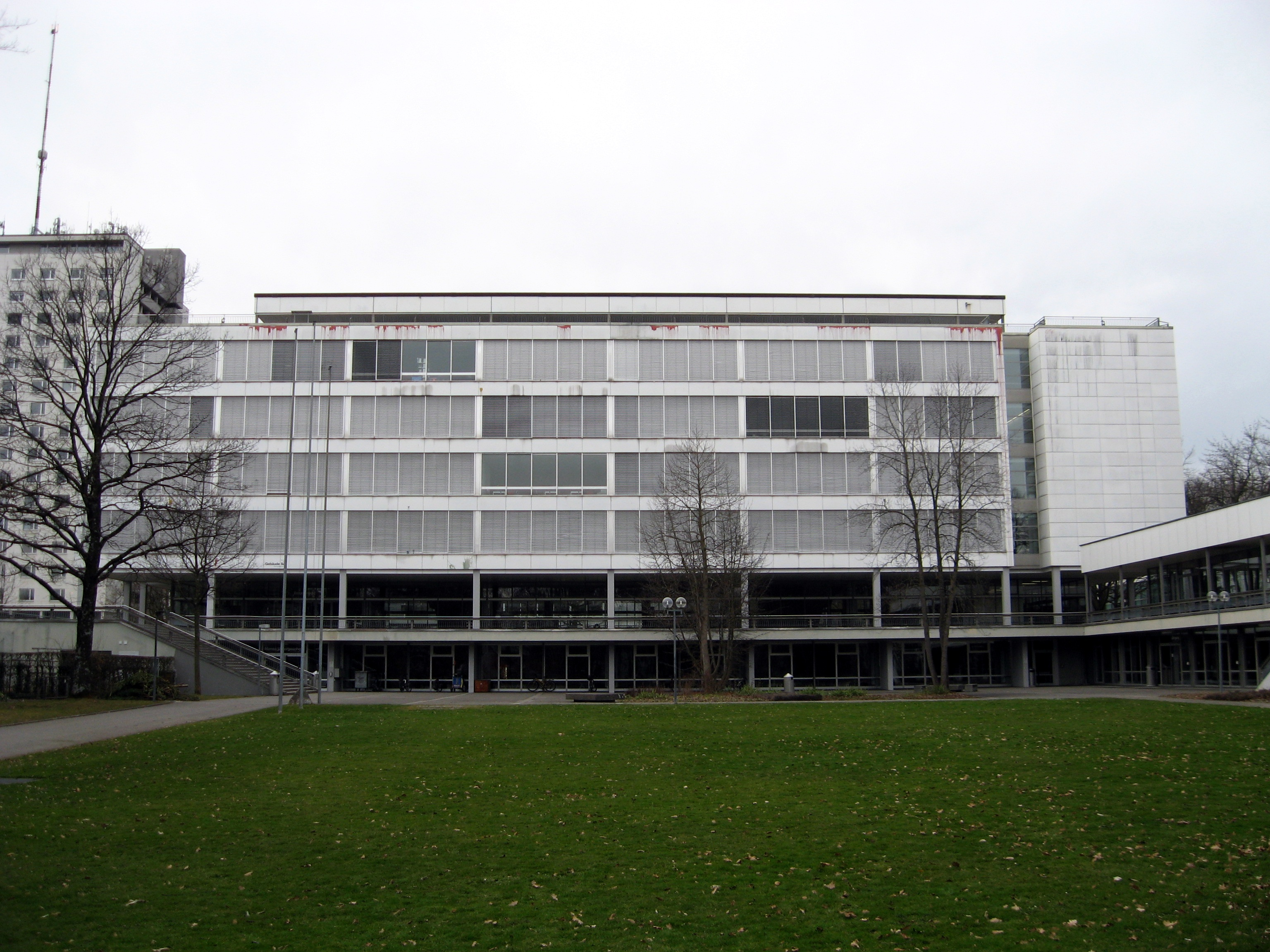
Gymnasium Neufeld

Fifteen years after the Second World War, the number of secondary school pupils increased to such an extent that Gymnasium Kirchenfeld was no longer large enough to accommodate all the pupils. A new school building had to be constructed. The project was realised between 1962 and 1965 by architects Hans Andres and Felix Wyler at the end of Bern's Länggasse district in Bremgartenwald - the new building was occupied by the municipal literary grammar school and the municipal secondary school in spring 1965. The building was officially inaugurated in 1966.

== 50th anniversary ==
The school celebrated its 50th anniversary in 2016 and events took place throughout the year. This included a re-enactment of a 1966 school day, a series of alumni meetings and the official ceremony on 17 June. As part of the anniversary, the documentary "Ein halbes Jahrhundert" (half a century) was produced by Denise Carla Haas.

== Notable alumni ==
- Peter Gilliéron - president of the Swiss Football Association.
- Bernard Pulver - former footballer and chairman of FC Köniz.
- Alec von Graffenried - Politician and mayor of Bern.

== Bibliography ==
- AC (in German). Editions Girsberger. 1966.
- "Das neue Gymasium Neufeld". Berner Tagwacht. 30 June 1966.
- Freiburghaus, Katrin (15 January 2016). ""Musste drei Wochen lang den Schulhof wischen"". 20 Minuten (in German).
- "Im Gymnasium Neufeld entsteht von Schülerhand ein 300 Quadratmeter grosses Wandbild". Der Bund. 17 January 1984.
- "Der Standort für das zweite Gymnasium". Der Bund. No. 2. 4 September 1958.
- Bundi, Stephan; Marti, Christoph; Reichenau, Christoph (2009). 1969-2009 museal neufeld. Bern: Stämpfli Verlag. ISBN 9783727211256.
- Böhler, Michael; Schwab, Werner (1978). Das Kernfachsystem als Oberstufenreform : Bericht über eine Erhebung am Literar- und Realgymnasium Bern-Neufeld und am Gymnasium Köniz von 1976. Bern: Böhler.
- Haas, Denise Carla (25 January 2017). "Film "Ein halbes Jahrhundert"". Carla Haas Productions. Gymnasium Neufeld.
