= Malbašić =

Malbašić (Serbian Cyrillic: Малбашић) is a surname. Notable people with the surname include:

- Filip Malbašić (born 1992), Serbian footballer
- Stojan Malbašić (born 1959), Bosnia and Herzegovina footballer
