= Banja Luka City Stadium =

Stadium in Banja Luka, Republika Srpska, Bosnia and Herzegovina

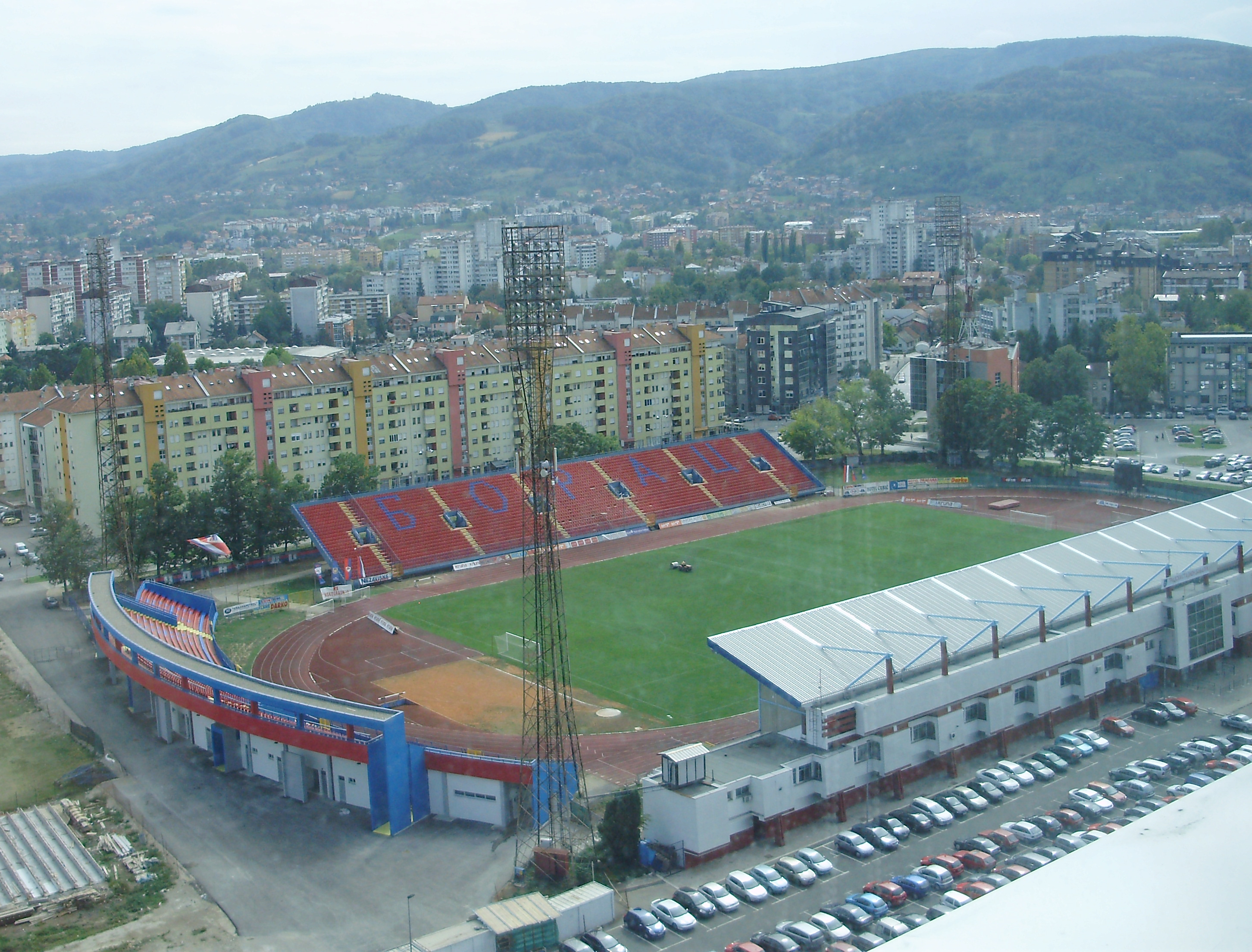
- UEFA
- Interactive map of Banja Luka City Stadium
- Full name: Gradski stadion Banja Luka
- Location: Borik, Banja Luka, Bosnia and Herzegovina
- Coordinates: 44.7761°N 17.1996°E
- Owner: Banja Luka
- Operator: Borac Banja Luka
- Capacity: 10,030 (seated)
- Surface: Hybrid grass
- Scoreboard: LED
- Field size: 105 by 68 metres (114.8 × 74.4 yd)

Construction
- Opened: 5 September 1937
- Expanded: 1973, 1981, 2010, 2012
- Architect: Žarko Malić

Tenants
- Krajišnik Banja Luka (1937–1941); Borac Banja Luka (1937–present)

Banja Luka City Stadium (Gradski stadion Banja Luka / Градски стадион Бања Лука) is a multi-purpose stadium in Borik, Banja Luka, Republika Srpska an entity of Bosnia and Herzegovina. It is currently used mostly for football matches and is the home ground of FK Borac Banja Luka. The stadium has a capacity to hold 10,030 seated spectators.

== History ==
Football begin being played in Banja Luka before World War I. During the period between the two world wars, Banja Luka was the seat of one of the national subassociations of the Football Association of Yugoslavia, the Banja Luka football subassociation. Football popularity grew, main city club Krajišnik managed qualification to the 1935–36 Yugoslav Football Championship, so officials deemed the current facilities inadequate. A new stadium with better conditions for playing and bigger capacity was built in the place where the main club in the city, SK Krajišnik, had its field. The architect of a new stadium was Žarko Malić. The stadium was officially inaugurated on 5 September 1937, with its first official name "Stadium of Bogoljub Kujundžić" in honor of Kujundžić, one of the main donators of the stadium, and the ban of the Vrbas Banovina. At the inauguration day, two games were played. The first, as warm-up, was between Hajduk Banja Luka against Meteor Krupa, and then the main game, between SK Krajišnik against the guests who were the Yugoslav champions that year, BSK Belgrade.

Besides football, the stadium was until WWII also used for the back then very popular Sokol society sports events.

After the World War II, SK Krajišnik was disbanded by the new authorities, and the stadium received its present name, the Banja Luka City Stadium and FK Borac Banja Luka became its main tenant. Later, when Bosnian War started, the stadium was elected by the newly formed Football Association of Republika Srpska to become the national stadium of the self-proclaimed Republika Srpska and was the place where on 20 December 1992, the first, and only, match with the characters of a national team of the Republika Srpska official football team, was played. It was against the team representing the Republic of Serbian Krajina, and the final result was a 1:1 draw.

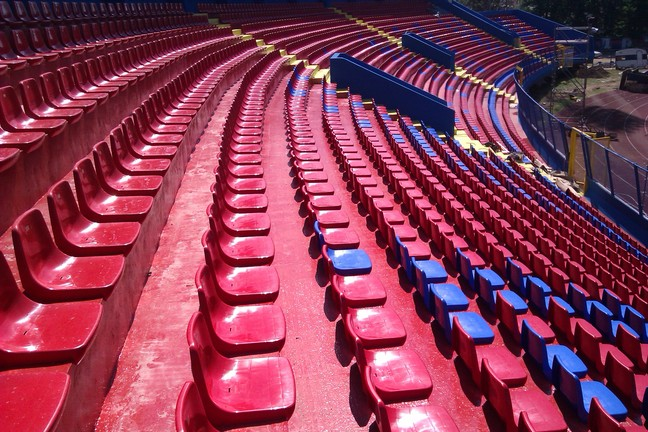
North stand of the Banja Luka City Stadium under construction during 2012.

The highest attendance on the stadium was recorded in 1989 when there was 30,000 people. The stadium underwent several expansions and reconstructions in the year 1973 and 1981, 2010 and 2012. The first match under reflectors was played on 11 October, in 1973. The east stand, where the most loyal fans, the Lešinari, are located, was built in 1981. In 2010, the stadium underwent complete reconstruction. New seats were installed, locker rooms were renovated, a completely new VIP lounge and media room was built, new lighting, sound systems and video surveillance were installed, and trophy as well technical rooms were renovated. In 2012, new north stand was built with a capacity of 2,492 seats, which increased the total capacity of stadium finally to 9,730. Today, the stadium meets UEFA demands for spectators comfort and security and it has separate section for guest fans. In its history, it has hosted numerous international matches at a senior level, athletes meetings, concerts of famous regional and worldwide stars and other manifestations. According to recent plans, the east stand will be covered by roof in upcoming years. In the near future, the construction of the south stand will begin, which would increase the total capacity to approximately 13,000 seats.

== New Stadium ==
In 2008, the expert committee chose the concept of building a new stadium. The new stadium will have 30,000 seats and the whole complex will cover 205,000 square meters.

It will include two additional football fields, tennis, basketball and volleyball courts. The cost of the whole project is estimated to be €50 million and it will meet the highest FIFA and UEFA demands.

== Concerts ==
- May 31, 2001 — Zdravko Čolić
- June 26, 2002 — Ceca (Decenija Tour)
- June 28, 2008 — Ceca (Grom Tour)
- July 8, 2009 — Lepa Brena
- July 23, 2009 — Lenny Kravitz
- August 28, 2009 — Goran Bregović
- June 29, 2012 — Dom za vešanje punk opera
- June 27, 2014 — Miligram
- August 21, 2015 — Željko Joksimović
- June 29, 2016 — Miligram
