= Božur Matejić =

Serbian-Yugoslav footballer

Personal information
- Full name: Božur Matejić
- Date of birth: December 20, 1963 (age 62)
- Place of birth: Prokuplje, SFR Yugoslavia
- Position: Midfielder

Youth career
- ?–1982: Red Star Belgrade

Senior career*
Years	Team	Apps	(Gls)
1982–1984	Rad	15	(1)
1984–1990	Borac Banja Luka		
1990–1991	Castellón	6	(0)
1991	Zemun	5	(0)
- * Club domestic league appearances and goals

Božur Matejić (Serbian Cyrillic: Божур Матејић, born 20 December 1963 in Prokuplje) is a Serbian Yugoslav retired footballer.

== Club career ==
Matejić played for Borac Banja Luka in the Yugoslav First League. While playing for this club he won 1987–88 Yugoslav Cup in 1988. Actually, he played arena football better than stadium football according to many sources.
