= Amir Durgutović =

Yugoslav footballer

Personal information
- Full name: Amir Durgutović
- Date of birth: 12 January 1968 (age 58)
- Place of birth: Tuzla, SFR Yugoslavia
- Position: Forward

Senior career*
Years	Team	Apps	(Gls)
1987	Borac Banja Luka	9	(1)
1987	Sutjeska Nikšić	14	(2)
1988–1990	Borac Banja Luka	62	(4)
1990	Adanaspor	7	(0)
1991–1997	Zvijezda Gradačac		

Managerial career
- 2009: Zvijezda Gradačac
- * Club domestic league appearances and goals

Amir Durgutović (born 12 January 1968) is a Bosnian retired professional footballer and former football manager.

== Playing career ==
Durgutović played for Borac Banja Luka and Sutjeska Nikšić in Yugoslavia, and had a brief spell with Adanaspor in the Turkish Süper Lig. He finished his career playing with Zvijezda Gradačac in 1997. Durgutović played for Borac in the 1987–88 Yugoslav Cup final win over Red Star Belgrade.

== Managerial career ==
On 25 September 2009, Durgutović became the new manager of Zvijezda Gradačac. He stayed on that position until 20 December of that same year, winning 3, drawing 1 and losing 4 games.

== Managerial statistics ==
Managerial record by team and tenure
Team	Nat	From	To	Record							
Team	Nat	From	To	G	W	D	L	GF	GA	GD	Win %
Zvijezda Gradačac	(Bosnia and Herzegovina)	25 September 2009	20 December 2009	8	3	1	4	10	16	−6	37.50
Total				8	3	1	4	10	16	−6	37.50

== Honours ==
=== Player ===
Borac Banja Luka

- Yugoslav Cup: 1987–88
