= Oliver Jandrić =

Bosnia and Herzegovina footballer and manager

Personal information
- Full name: Oliver Jandrić
- Date of birth: 21 December 1974 (age 51)
- Place of birth: Banja Luka, SFR Yugoslavia
- Height: 1.80 m (5 ft 11 in)
- Position: Midfielder

Youth career
- Borac Banja Luka

Senior career*
Years	Team	Apps	(Gls)
- Elektrobosna
- Sloga Trn
2001-2002	Wolfsberger AC		
2002	Železničar Ljubljana	1	(0)
2003–2010	Borac Banja Luka	102+	(11+)

Managerial career
- 2012–2013: Borac Banja Luka (ass't)
- * Club domestic league appearances and goals

Oliver Jandrić (Serbian Cyrillic: Оливер Јандрић, born 21 December 1974) is a Bosnian-Herzegovinian football manager and former player.

== Playing career ==
=== Club ===
Jandrić spent 14 years at hometown club Borac Banja Luka in addition to a season in Austria and Slovenia.

== Managerial career ==
He reached an agreement with Borac' president Srdjan Šuput after they were in dispute over outstanding payment to the former coach. In September 2016 he was appointed the new sports director at Borac Banja Luka, the club where he spent most of his playing days and was club captain for several years.
