= Milorad Bilbija =

Yugoslav association football player

Personal information
- Date of birth: 17 July 1964 (age 62)
- Place of birth: Sanski Most, SFR Yugoslavia
- Position: Defender

Senior career*
Years	Team	Apps	(Gls)
1983–1992	Borac Banja Luka	152	(0)
1992–1993	Gaziantepspor	13	(0)
1993–1994	OFK Kikinda		
- Sloboda Novi Grad
- Sloga Trn

Managerial career
- 2011–2013: Borac Banja Luka (assistant)
- * Club domestic league appearances and goals

Milorad Bilbija (Serbian Cyrillic: Милорад Билбија; born 17 July 1964) is a Bosnian retired footballer who played as a defender and current football manager.

== Career ==
Born in Sanski Most, SR Bosnia and Herzegovina, back then still within Yugoslavia, he played for almost a decade with Borac Banja Luka in the Yugoslav First and Second Leagues, and during the time of club's greatest success which was winning the 1987-88 Yugoslav Cup. Next, he had a spell alongside compatriot Elvir Bolić at Gaziantepspor in the Turkish Super Lig. Then, he joined Serbian club OFK Kikinda playing with them in the 1993–94 First League of FR Yugoslavia.

== Personal life ==
Bilbija's son, Nemanja, is also a professional footballer who currently plays for Bosnian and Herzegovinian Premier League club Zrinjski Mostar.

== Honours ==
Borac Banja Luka

- Yugoslav Cup: 1987–88
- Mitropa Cup: 1992

== External sources ==
- Interview on Borac B.Luka official website. (in Serbian)
- Stats from Borac Banja Luka
- Milorad Bilbija at the Turkish Football Federation
