= Slobodan Karalić =

Yugoslav and Bosnian footballer and coach (1956–2013)

Personal information
- Full name: Slobodan Karalić
- Date of birth: 14 May 1956
- Place of birth: Banja Luka, FPR Yugoslavia
- Date of death: 26 November 2013 (aged 57)
- Position: Goalkeeper

Youth career
- 1968–1974: Borac Banja Luka

Senior career*
Years	Team	Apps	(Gls)
1974–1983	Borac Banja Luka		
1983–1984	Red Star Belgrade	0	(0)
1984–1987	Ethnikos Piraeus	55	(0)
1987–1991	Borac Banja Luka		

Managerial career
- 1991: Ethnikos Piraeus (gk coach)
- 1992: Ethnikos Piraeus (assistant)
- 1994–1995: Olympiacos (assistant)
- 1995: Evagoras Paphos
- 1996–1998: Nea Salamina
- 2002: Borac Banja Luka
- * Club domestic league appearances and goals

Slobodan Karalić (Serbian Cyrillic: Слободан Каралић; 14 May 1956 – 26 November 2013) was a Yugoslav and Bosnian footballer and manager.

== Club career ==
Karalić played for FK Borac Banja Luka in the Yugoslav First League. While playing for this club he won 1987–88 Yugoslav Cup. He was also a member of FK Crvena Zvezda in 1983/84 season, but he did not play in any league match.

== Coaching career ==
After retiring he had a coaching career in Greece, Cyprus and Bosnia and Herzegovina.

== Personal life and death ==
His son is Vladimir Karalić After a long and serious illness, Slobodan Karalić died on 26 November 2013.
