= Damir Špica =

Yugoslav and Bosnian footballer and coach (born 1962)

Personal information
- Full name: Damir Špica
- Date of birth: November 11, 1962 (age 63)
- Place of birth: Banja Luka, SFR Yugoslavia
- Position: Midfielder

Youth career
- 1977–1979: Borac Banja Luka

Senior career*
Years	Team	Apps	(Gls)
1979–1991	Borac Banja Luka	584	(55)
1991–1995	Athinaikos	102	(16)
1995–1996	Omonia Aradippou	26	(3)
1996–1998	AO Kerkyra	38	(6)
- * Club domestic league appearances and goals

Damir Špica (born 11 November 1962, in Banja Luka) is a Yugoslav and Bosnian retired association footballer and football manager.

== Career ==
Špica played for Borac Banja Luka in the Yugoslav First League. While playing for this club he won the 1987–88 Yugoslav Cup. He managed Sloboda Novi Grad since 2024.
