= Stojan Malbašić =

Bosnian footballer and administrator (born 1959)

President of FK Borac Banja Luka
- In office 6 August 2020 – 3 April 2023
- Preceded by: Vico Zeljković
- Succeeded by: Milan Tegeltija

Personal details
- Born: 15 September 1959 (age 67) Banja Luka, FPR Yugoslavia
Association football career
- Position: Right-back
Senior career*
Years	Team	Apps	(Gls)
1979–1980	BSK Banja Luka		
1980–1992	Borac Banja Luka	260	(1)
International career
1992	Republika Srpska	1	(0)
Managerial career
- 2002–2003: Borac Banja Luka
- * Club domestic league appearances and goals

Stojan Malbašić (Serbian Cyrillic: Стојан Малбашић; born 15 September 1959) is a Bosnian retired professional footballer and football executive who most recently served as president of Bosnian Premier League club Borac Banja Luka from 2020 to 2023.

== Career ==
Malbašić played for hometown club Borac Banja Luka in the Yugoslav First League, helping the side win the 1987–88 Yugoslav Cup. In 1992, he was part of the Republika Srpska official football team. He later managed Borac in the Bosnian Premier League from 2002 to 2003.

On 23 May 2016, Malbašić was appointed as the secretary of the coaching staff of Borac Banja Luka. He was secretary until 6 August 2020, after which he became the new president of Borac, succeeding Vico Zeljković. Malbašić was succeeded by Milan Tegeltija as the club's president on 3 April 2023.

== Honours ==
=== Player ===
Borac Banja Luka

- Yugoslav Cup: 1987–88
- Mitropa Cup: 1992
