= BHFanaticos =

Association football supporters' association

- Nickname: Fanatikosi
- Abbreviation: BHF
- Founded: 2000
- Type: Supporters' group
- Teams: Bosnia and Herzegovina national football team; Bosnia and Herzegovina national basketball team; Bosnia and Herzegovina men's national handball team; Bosnia and Herzegovina national sitting volleyball team
- Motto: "Nad nama nebo ima da gori" (The sky is going to burn above us)
- Headquarters: Bosnia and Herzegovina
- Website: bhfanaticos.com

BHFanaticos is the largest supporters group in Bosnia and Herzegovina who follow Bosnian national sport teams mostly in football, basketball, handball and sitting volleyball. Members are located throughout Europe, United States and Australia.

Since the Bosnian national anthem has no lyrics, BHFanaticos sing lyrics from the old national anthem Jedna si jedina.

A lilly is the prominent part of the BHFanaticos logo. It is based on Lilium bosniacum which is native to Bosnia and Herzegovina. It is a historical symbol related to the House of Kotromanić who ruled the Kingdom of Bosnia in medieval period and also found in the former flag of Bosnia.

Group's mission states: "A unique group of special people was formed, bound by the same goal and the same love for people who leave their hearts on the field. Like them, we leave our hearts on the stand, which for us is a sanctuary and a home, where we sincerely show our passion, love and support with our whole being."

== Celebrations ==
=== Road to the World Cup ===
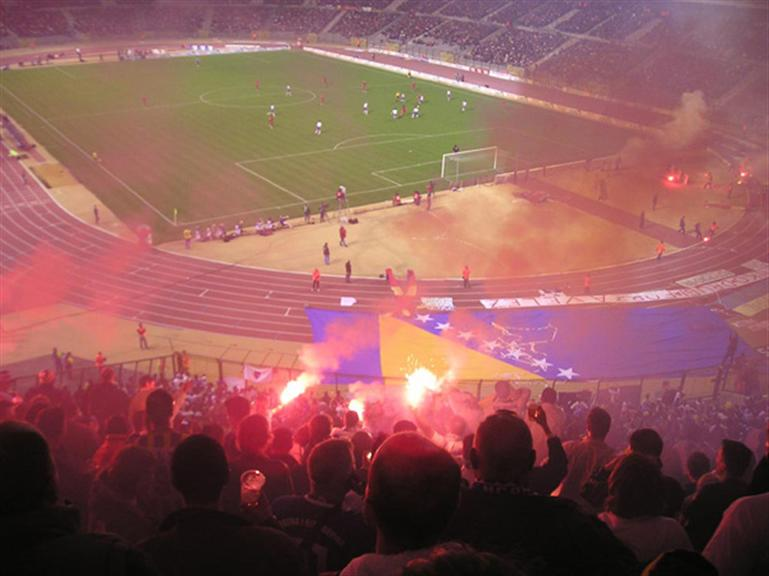
Bosnian supporters in Brussels, 26 March 2005

Bosnian football fans came from all over the world to support Bosnia's participation in the 2026 World Cup.

5,000 miles away from home, "Bosnia-Herzegovina fans, they pounded drums, shouted through megaphones, set off smoke bombs".

Bosnian fans’ fire is love, not anger. One fan said that "We are so emotional because of our history, our identity, trying to define ourselves. You don’t support Bosnia because it is easy or successful. You support it because it is yours." Another fan, Kemal said that "We are about bringing intense passion, flares, noise, and the electric atmosphere when Bosnian fans come together”.

=== 12th Player ===
Ermin Mahmic said the Bosnia fans are creating the atmosphere so welcoming that they feel like they are playing a home game. He said the fans are like the team's 12th player and they are carrying the players through the tournament so much it is not normal.

== Controversies ==
=== Disruptive Behaviour ===
On 13 October 2023 during a match between Liechtenstein and Bosnia and Herzegovina (Euro 2024 qualifiers) a CEDB decision affected the attendance of supporters at UEFA match to ban the Bosnia and Herzegovina Football Federation from selling tickets to its away supporters for its next UEFA competition match along with a fine of €20,000 to the Bosnia and Herzegovina football federation.

On 16 October 2023 during match: Bosnia and Herzegovina and Portugal (European Championship 2024 Qualifying match) CEDB decision was a fine of €20,000 to the Bosnia and Herzegovina football federation along with an order of partial closure of the Bosnia and Herzegovina Football Federation’s stadium during the next UEFA competition match in which it plays as host association. This meant losing at least 3,000 seats.

=== Lighting flares in Norway ===
On 24 March 2007 during match between Bosnia and Herzegovina and Norway at the Ullevål Stadium in Oslo, BHFanaticos caused an hour-long delay due to an unprecedented amount of flares that had been thrown onto the pitch in protest against corruption of Bosnia and Herzegovina football federation president Munib Ušanović, who later has been sentenced to five years in jail for tax fraud.

=== Racist and/or Discriminatory behaviour ===
==== Hungary disruption ====
On 14 October 2024 at match: Bosnia and Herzegovina vs. Hungary (0:2) (UEFA Nations League 2024/25) CEDB decided to fine Bosnia and Herzegovina football federation €25,000 along with an order of the partial closure of Bosnia and Herzegovina football federation’s stadium during the next UEFA national team competition match in which Bosnia and Herzegovina football federation will play as host association, for the racist and/or discriminatory behaviour of its supporters. Along with the fine for Bosnia and Herzegovina Football Federation of €4,250 for throwing of objects.

==== Zenica incident ====
On June 12, 2015, on the day of a UEFA European championship qualification game between Bosnia and Herzegovina and Israel, in Zenica's Bilino Polje stadium, group of the Bosnia supporters caused racist behavior prior and during the game.

Charges were brought before UEFA's CEDB against the Bosnia and Herzegovina football federation after the incident for disruption of national anthem, setting off and/or throwing of fireworks and objects and discriminatory behaviour. CEDB has ordered a partial closure of the Bosnia and Herzegovina Football Federation’s stadium during the next UEFA competition match in which it plays as host association along with a fine of €18,000.

==== Vienna incident ====
In Vienna, just prior to a friendly game between Bosnia and Austria on March 31, 2015, group of Bosnian fans joined a pro-Palestine protest on city's main square, the Stephansplatz. During short participation, a group was chanting threats and it was recorded on video.
