= Elvedin Begić =

Bosnian football official (1960–2024)

President of the Football Association of Bosnia and Herzegovina
- In office 13 December 2012 – 16 March 2021
- Preceded by: Ivica Osim (as President of the normalization committee)
- Succeeded by: Vico Zeljković

Personal details
- Born: 24 October 1960 Sarajevo, PR Bosnia and Herzegovina, FPR Yugoslavia
- Died: 31 May 2024 (aged 63) Sarajevo, Bosnia and Herzegovina
- Education: University of Sarajevo

Elvedin "Dino" Begić (24 October 1960 – 31 May 2024) was a Bosnian football executive who was president of the Football Association of Bosnia and Herzegovina (N/FSBiH) from 2012 to 2021. He had previously been a member of the N/FSBiH normalization committee established by FIFA in April 2011.

In July 2015, Begić was named Vice-Chairman of the UEFA Stadium and Security Committee for the period 2015–2019. He was selected as Vice-Chairman again for the period 2019–2023. In addition, he was the Sarajevo Canton Football Federation (FSKS) president from 2012 to 2016, and had worked as a delegate of the FSKS and as a member of the FSKS committee.

Begić was a graduate of the Faculty of Transport and Communications from the University of Sarajevo and also served as an executive director at the Sarajevo International Airport.

== Death ==
On 31 May 2024, Begić died at the age of 63 in Sarajevo, following a bout of cancer.
