= Mladen Jurkas =

Bosnian footballer (born 2007)

Personal information
- Full name: Mladen Jurkas
- Date of birth: 7 October 2007 (age 19)
- Place of birth: Doboj, Bosnia and Herzegovina
- Height: 1.93 m (6 ft 4 in)
- Position: Goalkeeper

Team information
- Current team: Borac Banja Luka
- Number: 72

Youth career
- 2014–2022: Sloga Doboj
- 2022–2025: Borac Banja Luka

Senior career*
Years	Team	Apps	(Gls)
2025–	Borac Banja Luka	42	(0)

International career^{‡}
2021–2022	Bosnia and Herzegovina U15	6	(0)
2023–2024	Bosnia and Herzegovina U16	2	(0)
2023–2024	Bosnia and Herzegovina U17	9	(0)
2025–	Bosnia and Herzegovina U21	4	(0)
- * Club domestic league appearances and goals as of 8 November 2026 ‡ National team caps and goals as of 1 June 2026

Mladen Jurkas (born 7 October 2007) is a Bosnian professional footballer who plays as a goalkeeper for Bosnian Premier League club Borac Banja Luka.

== Club career ==
Jurkas started his professional career at Borac Banja Luka in 2025, at the age of 16.

== International career ==
In May 2026, Jurkas was named to Bosnia and Herzegovina's squad for the 2026 FIFA World Cup.

== Career statistics ==
=== Club ===
As of match played 8 November 2026

Appearances and goals by club, season and competition
Club	Season	League			Bosnian Cup		Continental		Other		Total	
Club	Season	Division	Apps	Goals	Apps	Goals	Apps	Goals	Apps	Goals	Apps	Goals
Borac Banja Luka	2024–25	Bosnian Premier League	2	0	1	0	0	0	1 (Note: Appearance in Bosnian Supercup)	0	4	0
Borac Banja Luka	2025–26	Bosnian Premier League	31	0	—		1 (Note: Appearance(s) in UEFA Conference League)	0	—		32	0
Borac Banja Luka	2026–27	Bosnian Premier League	9	0	0	0	9	0	—		18	0
Borac Banja Luka	Total		42	0	1	0	10	0	1	0	54	0
Career total			42	0	1	0	10	0	1	0	54	0

== Honours ==
Borac Banja Luka

- Bosnian Premier League: 2025–26
