= Football Association of Bosnia and Herzegovina =

Governing body of association football in Bosnia and Herzegovina

UEFA
- Short name: N/FSBiH
- Founded: 1920; 106 years ago; 1992; 34 years ago (refounded)
- Headquarters: Sarajevo
- FIFA affiliation: 1996
- UEFA affiliation: 1998
- President: Vico Zeljković
- Website: nfsbih.ba

The Football Association of Bosnia and Herzegovina (Note: Bosnian: Fudbalski savez Bosne i Hercegovine, Croatian: Nogometni savez Bosne i Hercegovine, Serbian: Фудбалски савез Босне и Херцеговине, romanized: Fudbalski savez Bosne i Hercegovine) (N/FSBiH, Serbian Cyrillic: Н/ФСБиХ), based in Sarajevo, is the chief officiating body of football in Bosnia and Herzegovina. The Bosnian football association was founded as the Sarajevo football sub-association of Yugoslavia in 1920. In 1992, the association was re-founded as the Football Association of Bosnia and Herzegovina.

In May 2002, the Football Federation of Bosnia and Herzegovina was unified to include both Bosnian regional football associations, the Football Association of Republika Srpska, and the already unified Football Association of Bosnia and Herzegovina with the Football Federation of Herzeg-Bosnia. In April 2011, it changed its name from the Football Federation of Bosnia and Herzegovina to the Football Association of Bosnia and Herzegovina.

== History ==
=== Pre-independence (1903–1992) ===
The game reached Bosnia and Herzegovina at the start of the 20th century, with Sarajevo (in 1903) and Mostar (in 1905) being the first cities to embrace it. Banja Luka, Tuzla, Zenica and Bihać were next along with numerous smaller towns as the sport spread. The country was under Austro-Hungarian rule when official competition began in 1908, though these activities were on a small scale within each territory. At the outbreak of World War I, there were five clubs in Sarajevo, four based on religious and ethnic affiliation: Hrvatski ŠK (later known as SAŠK) as Bosnian Croatian, Srpski ŠK (later known as Slavija) affiliated to Bosnian Serbs, Muslimanski ŠK (later known as Sarajevski) affiliated to Bosniaks, and Židovski ŠK (later known as Barkohba) as Bosnian Jewish club; while only multi-ethnic was worker's club RŠD Hajduk. Along with Sarajevo-based clubs there were approximately 20 outside the capital. The creation of the Kingdom of Yugoslavia post 1918 brought an increase in the number of leagues, and soon a domestic national championship was organised featuring two teams from Bosnia and Herzegovina, the champions of Banja Luka football sub-association and Sarajevo football sub-association. In 1920, the direct predecessor of the football association of Bosnia-Herzegovina was founded as the Sarajevo football subassociation. The unified championship ran until 1939/40.

The Football Association of Bosnia and Herzegovina was founded after the Second World War, being affiliated to the Yugoslav Football Association.

Bosnia and Herzegovina's best sides at the time were FK Sarajevo, FK Željezničar (Sarajevo), FK Velež (Mostar), FK Sloboda (Tuzla), NK Čelik (Zenica) and FK Borac (Banja Luka) which played in the Yugoslavian first league, second league and cup competitions with moderate to good success, while its best players with the likes of Predrag Pašić, Vahid Halilhodžić, Davor Jozić, Safet Sušić, Josip Katalinski, Faruk Hadžibegić, Ivica Osim, Asim Ferhatović, Blaž Slišković, Mehmed Baždarević, Dušan Bajević, Edhem Šljivo, Enver Marić and many others were chosen to represent SFR Yugoslavia national football team.

=== Post-independence (1992–present) ===
The old Football Association of Bosnia and Herzegovina logo

During the season 1997–98 Bosnia-Herzegovina football league competition included both Bosniak and Bosnian Croat clubs playing against each other for the first time. Before this, the leagues ran strictly divided along ethnic lines. Bosnian Serb clubs joined the league system in 2002.

==== Premier League unification (May 2002) ====
In May, 2002, Football Association of Bosnia and Herzegovina was unified to include both Bosnian entity football associations, the Federation of Bosnia and Herzegovina Football Association, based in Sarajevo, and Republika Srpska Football Association, based in Banja Luka. The unified Premier League of Bosnia and Herzegovina that includes clubs from both entities started from the 2002-03 season and is active today. Each semi-autonomous half also has a federation of its own.

==== FIFA suspends Bosnian FA ====
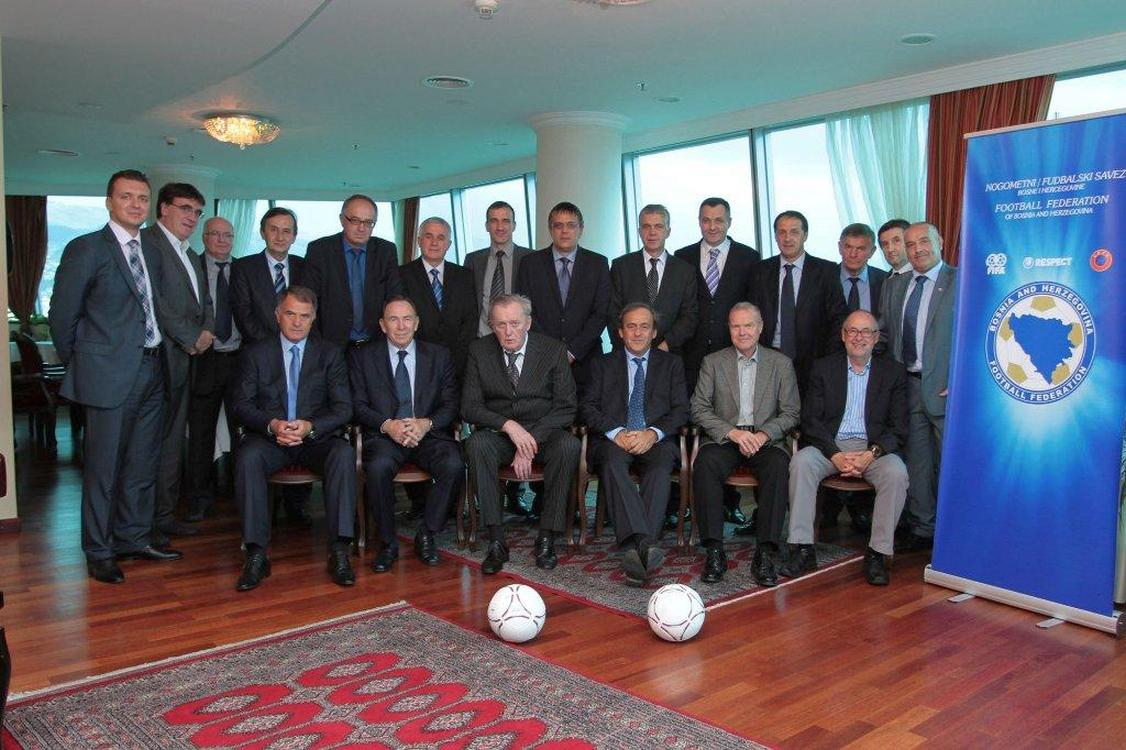
Head of normalization committee BiH Ivica Osim, with Dušan Bajević, Faruk Hadžibegić, Jasmin Baković and UEFA guests Michel Platini, Allan Hansen, Peter Gillieron, Theodore Theodoridis, Muhamed Taa. (October 2012 Sarajevo)

On 1 April 2011 UEFA and FIFA announced the suspension of the Football Association of Bosnia and Herzegovina with immediate effect. UEFA and FIFA decided to do so because the Association didn't follow the new UEFA statute, namely the rule under which the organization must be led by a single president. They had three, one for each one of the constituent national ethnicities: Bosniaks, Bosnian Serbs and Bosnian Croats, as was the case with the Dayton Agreement. The suspension was lifted on 30 May 2011 after the new statute was unanimously approved by all three ethnic groups.

In the past years, some Bosnian players were very vocal about their opposition to then-leaders in the Bosnian FA, who were elected or appointed because of ethnic affiliation rather than professional qualifications. Fans often either boycotted the games or displayed anti-FA banners at the games they did attend. 13 Bosnian national team players (Misimović, Berberović, Grujić, Bartolović, Hrgović, Bajramović, Papac, Spahić, Milenković, Grlić, Bešlija, Hasagić, and Tolja) released a statement published in Dnevni Avaz daily, announcing they would boycott all national team matches until four FA officials – Milan Jelić, Iljo Dominković, Sulejman Čolaković, and Ahmet Pašalić – resigned. "We will no longer accept call-ups to the national team while these people are performing these functions, hoping that our gesture will mark the first step in the healing of this cancer in our soccer and a new beginning for the national team for which our hearts beat." in the letter it was quoted. A new team had to be assembled to continue qualifications for Euro 2008. Former forwards Sergej Barbarez and Elvir Bolić were the most vocal against the corruption in the Bosnian FA appearing on numerous TV shows expressing their deep frustration about the situation in the Bosnian football over the years.

==== FIFA imposes normalisation committee (April 2011 – December 2012) ====
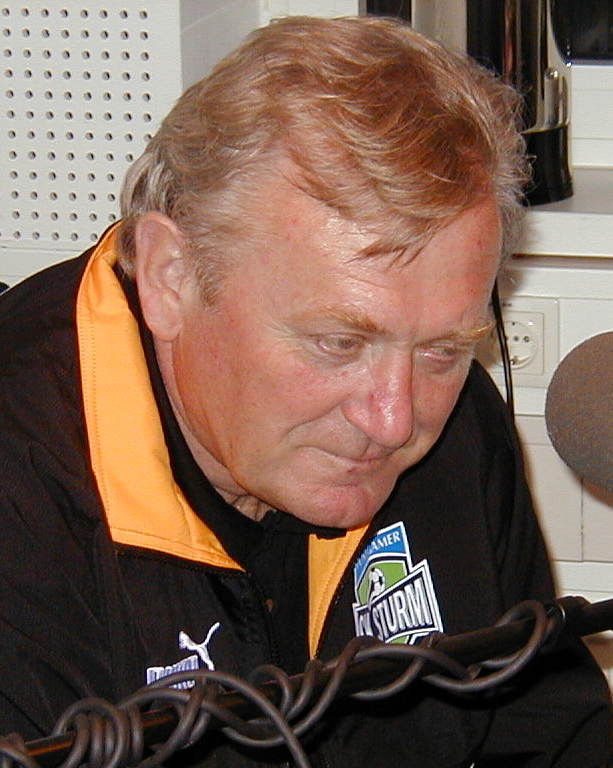
Ivica Osim become the interim leader of the Bosnian FA, after FIFA and UEFA suspended the country from international competitions for two months in April 2011

From 1 April 2011 to December 2012, NSBiH was run by a FIFA-imposed normalisation committee headed by football great Ivica Osim, which helped lift the FIFA imposed suspension of Bosnian football.

Other members of the Normalisation Committee included former football players and managers: Dušan Bajević, Sead Kajtaz, Faruk Hadžibegić, Sergej Barbarez and Jasmin Baković. According to many football enthusiasts, this was a welcome change for the football in the country. One of those dismissed from their positions was a former NSBiH secretary general Munib Ušanović, who was successfully prosecuted over tax evasion and illegal misappropriation of the NFSBiH funds. Together with Miodrag Kureš, Munib Ušanović has been sentenced to five years in jail over tax fraud.

==== Elvedin Begić elected first single president (December 2012) ====
On 13 December 2012, members of Football Association of Bosnia and Herzegovina voted in Elvedin Begić as the new first single president of the BiH football organization for the next four years. Begić was serving as vice president of the Normalisation Committee prior to this position.

==== UEFA President opens sport centre in Zenica (September 2013) ====
On 2 September 2013, UEFA President Michel Platini opened the Bosnia and Herzegovina Football Association new state of the art training centre, built with UEFA, FIFA and city of Zenica funding. Alongside of Michel Platini and Bosnian FA president Elvedin Begić, other special guests from the region included president of the Croatian Football Federation Davor Šuker, and Football Association of Serbia general secretary Zoran Laković. Also joining them were Ivica Osim, Jasmin Baković, Rodoljub Petković and at the time Bosnia-Herzegovina team coaches Safet Sušić and Borče Sredojević, as well as past team captain Emir Spahić, Senad Lulić, as well as Vlado Jagodić (coach of U21 Bosnia side at the time), former Bosnia players Muhamed Konjić, Elvir Bolić, Vedin Musić, and many others.

==== Football academy in Mostar (January 2015) ====
On 20 January 2015, Project dubbed "Projekat obnove sportskog centra u Mostaru za pomirenje u zajednici kroz promociju sporta" was announced meaning SKC Kantarevac in Mostar will be built and serve as the city's new football academy sponsored by Japanese embassy and Tsuneyasu Miyamoto and supported locally by Ivica Osim, former Japan national football team manager.

==== Vico Zeljković elected president (March 2021) ====
On 16 March 2021, Vico Zeljković, president of the Football Association of Republika Srpska, was elected president of the Bosnia and Herzegovina FA.

== Management ==
As of 10 December 2025

Position	Name
President	Vico Zeljković
Honorary President	Ivica Osim
General Secretary	Adnan Džemidžić
First vice president Board executive	Ivan Beus
Second vice president Board executive	Irfan Durić
Board executive	Ivan Perić
Board executive	Muhidin Raščić
Board executive	Midhet Sarajčić
Board executive	Dario Knezović
Board executive	Radika Marić
Board executive	Muris Jabandžić
Board executive	Ivo Ivkić
Board executive	Milorad O. Lale
Board executive	Elmir Šećerbegović
Board executive	Miloš Brkić
Board executive	Goran Velaula

Position	Name
Head of Appeals commission	Goran Marković
Head of Discipline commission	Goran Kosorić
Head of Committee for competition	Edin Felić
Head of Referee commission	Darko Čeferin
Head of First Instance Licensing committee	Miroslav Kodžoman
Head of Second Instance Licensing committee	Jasmin Budimlić
Head of Committee for Stadiums and Security	Adis Hajlovac
Head of Players' Status and Transfer Committee	Milenko Zelenović
Head of Legal Committee	Enes Hašić
Head of Committee for Sports Medicine	Davorka Katana
Head of Committee for Women's football	Samira Hurem
Head of Committee for Youth football	Ivan Dominković
Head of Committee for Futsal	Marko Brčić
Head of Committee for Media	Dragiša Ćorsović
Head of Committee for International relations	
Head of Committee for Finances	Milenko Nikolić
Head of the Technical committee	Goran Đukić
Head of Committee for Marketing and TV	Petar Galić

== Current head coaches ==
As of 5 August 2025

Men's Team	Name
National team	(Bosnia and Herzegovina) Sergej Barbarez
Under-21 team	(Bosnia and Herzegovina) Branislav Krunić
Under-19 team	(Bosnia and Herzegovina) Dubravko Orlović
Under-18 team	(Bosnia and Herzegovina) Dubravko Orlović
Under-17 team	(Bosnia and Herzegovina) Asmir Avdukić
Under-15 team	(Bosnia and Herzegovina) Čedomir Ćulum
Futsal team	(Bosnia and Herzegovina) Ivo Krezo

Women's Team	Name
National team	(Bosnia and Herzegovina) Selver Hodžić
Under-19 team	(Bosnia and Herzegovina) Dragan Jevtić
Under-17 team	(Bosnia and Herzegovina) Ilija Lucić

== List of presidents ==
Since Bosnia became a member of FIFA in 1996 and until April 2011, the Football Association was headed by a three-member presidency, made up of a Bosniak, a Croat and a Serb. Due to Bosnia's unique situation and its political problems this setup was tolerated for years by both FIFA and UEFA - until transition period was over on 1 April 2011, when they suspended the association for failing to comply with FIFA statutes.

No.	President	Period
As Members of the Presidency of FSBiH
1	Jusuf Pušina Jerko Doko	1994 – May 2002
2	Sulejman Čolaković Milan Jelić Bogdan Čeko Iljo Dominković	May 2002 – 18 April 2011
As President of the N/FSBiH normalization committee
1	Ivica Osim	18 April 2011 – 13 December 2012
As President of N/FSBiH
1	Elvedin Begić	13 December 2012 – 16 March 2021
2	Vico Zeljković	16 March 2021 – present

Note: Since 1996 to 2011 past FA presidency members were regularly rotated.

N/FSBiH operates these codes:

- Premier League of Bosnia and Herzegovina,
- Bosnia and Herzegovina Football Cup,
- Bosnia and Herzegovina Women's Football Cup,
- Bosnia and Herzegovina national futsal team,
- Bosnia and Herzegovina national under-15, under-17, under-19 and under-21 football team,
- Bosnia and Herzegovina men's national football team,
- Bosnia and Herzegovina women's national under-17 and under-19 national team,
- Bosnia and Herzegovina women's national football team among other footballing matters and codes.
