= Mario Mataja =

Bosnian-Herzegovinian footballer

Personal information
- Full name: Mario Mataja
- Date of birth: January 15, 1967 (age 59)
- Place of birth: Banja Luka, SFR Yugoslavia
- Position: Left full-back

Youth career
- 1974–1985: Borac Banja Luka

Senior career*
Years	Team	Apps	(Gls)
1985–1992	Borac Banja Luka		
1992–1993	Rijeka	5	(0)
1993–1994	Orijent		
1994–1996	Hrvatski Dragovoljac	35	(1)
1997–1999	Mladost 127	46	(3)

International career
- Yugoslavia U-21
- * Club domestic league appearances and goals

Mario Mataja is a former Bosnian-Herzegovinian footballer.

== Club career ==
Mataja played club football for Borac Banja Luka in the Yugoslav First League, helping the club win the 1987–88 Yugoslav Cup and Mitropa Cup in 1992. For a brief time, Mr. Mataja was player in Austria (SV Feldkirchen).
