= Dino Fazlic =

German footballer

Personal information
- Date of birth: 21 November 1991 (age 34)
- Place of birth: Banja Luka, Bosnia and Herzegovina
- Position: Midfielder

Youth career
- Werder Bremen
- 2011–2012: Bolton Wanderers
- Grasshoppers
- 2014–2015: Fulham

Senior career*
Years	Team	Apps	(Gls)
- Werder Bremen III
2015	Zadar	2	(0)
2015	Kidderminster Harriers	5	(0)
2016	FC Halifax Town	2	(0)
2016	TB Uphusen	12	(2)
2017–2018	VfB Oldenburg	24	(0)
2018–2022	Teutonia Ottensen	71	(3)
2022	FC Süderelbe	12	(4)
2023	CFC Hertha 06	12	(1)
2023–2024	Eintracht Mahlsdorf	18	(0)
- * Club domestic league appearances and goals as of 00:45, 4 July 2024 (UTC)

Dino Fazlic (born 21 November 1991) is a German footballer who most recently played as a midfielder for Eintracht Mahlsdorf.

== Career ==
As a youth player, Fazlic joined the youth academy of Bundesliga side Werder Bremen but left due to injury and problems with the manager.

In 2011, he joined the youth academy Bolton Wanderers in the English Premier League, where he suffered a hairline fracture and left due to relegation to the second division, before joining Swiss club Grasshoppers. After that, Fazlic almost signed for Chievo in the Italian Serie A and German lower league team SV Wilhelmshaven.

In 2014, he joined the youth academy of Fulham in the English Premier League but left due to change of manager.

Before the second half of the 2014–15 season, Fazlic signed for Croatian First Football League outfit NK Zadar, where he made two league appearances.

In 2015, he signed for Kidderminster Harriers in the English fifth division. In January 2026, he signed for FC Halifax Town on a contract until the end of the season.

In 2016, Fazlic signed for German fifth division side TB Uphusen.

Before the second half of the 2016–17 season, he signed for VfB Oldenburg in the fourth-tier Regionalliga Nord.

== Personal life ==
He is the son of Husnija Fazlić.
