= ŠK Krajišnik Banja Luka =

ŠK Krajišnik Banja Luka (Serbian Cyrillic: ШК Крајишник Бања Лука) was a football club based in Banja Luka, Vrbas Banovina, Kingdom of Yugoslavia.

== History ==
=== Beginnings ===
The club was formed in 1919 and, although football was already being played before, it is the first club registered in Banja Luka. Along with FK Sloboda Novi Grad, also from the region of Bosanska Krajina, back then roughly corresponding to the Vrbas Banovina Yugoslav subdivision, it was among the founders of the Zagreb football sub-association. Backed by some of the wealthiest people from the town, Krajišnik became the dominant and most popular club in Banja Luka, and the interwar period was marked by a rivalry and local derby with ĐSK Balkan, with Borac being the outsider, or third contender. Krajišnik initially existed as Građanski sportski klub Krajišnik, and included a tennis section as well. After initially being part of the Zagreb football subassociation, soon after, Vrbas Banovina region was separated and Banja Luka football subassociation was formed.

=== Golden era ===
Krajišnik dominated the competition within the sub-association, and after numerous failed attempts, it reached to qualify to the 1935–36 Yugoslav Football Championship. After passing the round of sixteen because of Hajduk Split withdrew from the tournament, they lost against SK Ljubljana in the quarter-finals (1–3;1–4).

=== New stadium ===
Popularity of football was increasing, so in 1937, mostly funded by the donations of Bogoljub Kujundžić, the ban of the Vrbas Banovina, a new stadium was inaugurated, the Banja Luka City Stadium, which was initially named after him until the start of the Second World War. At its inauguration on September 5, 1937, Krajišnik played against Yugoslav champions BSK Belgrade. Earlier, the first night football game under electric illumination was played in 1933 between Krajišnik and FK Mačva Šabac.

=== Disbandment ===
At the start of Second World War, Krajišnik disappeared as the region fells under control of the Nazi Germany-backed Independent State of Croatia. At the end of the war in 1945 the new authorities supported the labour movement-backed FK Borac and gave them the property that belonged to Krajišnik which was not revived ever after.

== Players and coaches ==
At the 1935–36 Yugoslav Championship, Krajišnik was coached by Milorad Zakić, and the players were: Milorad Zakić (coach/goalkeeper), Ranko Kasalović, Vojislav Davidović, Dimitrije Marić, Mehmed Jakić, Vojislav Samardžija, Božidar Kačavenda, Petar Cvetković, Zvonimir Kurtović, Arsen Ljubibratić, Aleksandar Mastela, Ivica Bilić and Vladislav Beljanski.
