= Steindl =

Steindl is a surname. It may refer to:

- Andreas Steindl (b. 1989), Swiss ski mountaineer
- David Steindl-Rast (b. 1926), Catholic Benedictine monk
- Helmar Steindl (b. 1945), Austrian slalom canoer
- Imre Steindl (1839–1902), Hungarian architect
- Josef Steindl (1912–1993), Austrian-born Post-Keynesian economist
- Klaus T. Steindl (born 1966), Austrian film director
- Peter Steindl (b. 1970), head coach of the Scotland cricket team
