= Borik, Banja Luka =

Coordinates: 44°46′12″N 17°12′17″E

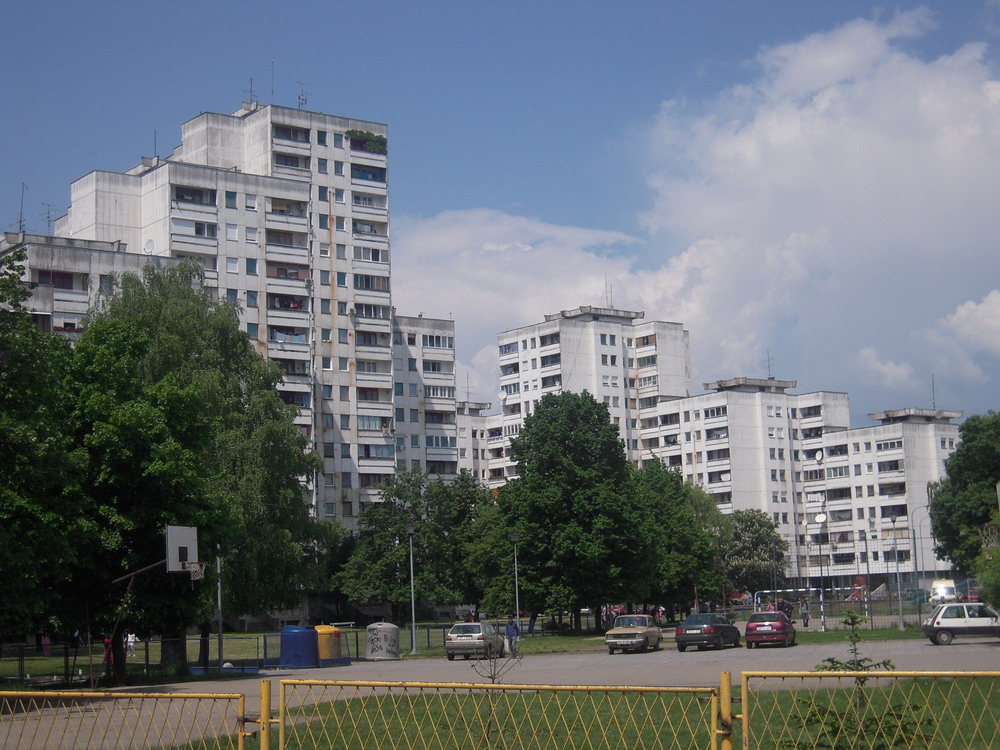
Buildings in Borik

Borik is an urban neighborhood in the city of Banja Luka, Bosnia and Herzegovina (Republika Srpska entity). It was built northeast of the old city center after an earthquake in 1969 when Banjaluka was heavily damaged. Borik was planned for housing of people who lost their homes in an earthquake and it was built in a brutalist architectural style, typical for cities that were developed under an influence of a communist system.
