= 1992 Mitropa Cup =

Tournament details
- Teams: 4

Final positions
- Champions: (Socialist Federal Republic of Yugoslavia) Borac Banja Luka (1st title)
- Runners-up: (Hungary) BVSC Budapest

Tournament statistics
- Matches played: 3
- Goals scored: 4 (1.33 per match)

The 1992 Mitropa Cup was the 50th and last season of the Mitropa football club tournament. It was won by Borac Banja Luka who beat BVSC Budapest in the final 1–1 (5–3 after penalty shoot-out).

== Semi-finals ==
Matches played on 27 May 1992.

Team 1	Score	Team 2
Foggia (Italy)	2–2 (2–4 p)	(Socialist Federal Republic of Yugoslavia) Borac Banja Luka
BVSC Budapest (Hungary)	0–0 (6–5 p)	(Czechoslovakia) DAC Dunajská Streda

== Final ==
29 May 1992

(Socialist Federal Republic of Yugoslavia) Borac Banja Luka	1–1 (a.e.t.)	(Hungary) BVSC Budapest
Filipović 4'		Tuboly 67'
Penalties
Šašivarević (penalty scored); Stavljanin (penalty scored); Filipović (penalty scored); Bilbija (penalty scored); Simeunović (penalty scored)	5–3	(penalty scored) Nikiforov; (penalty scored) Iscak; (penalty scored) Nahóczky; (penalty missed) Molnár; (penalty missed) Tuboly

Stadio Pino Zaccheria, Foggia
Attendance: 1,000
Referee: Roman Steindl (Austria)

== See also ==
- 1991–92 European Cup
- 1991–92 European Cup Winners' Cup
- 1991–92 UEFA Cup
