= Peter Gilliéron =

Swiss lawyer and football official (born 1953)

Peter Heinrich Gilliéron
- Born: 5 May 1953 (age 72); Brescia
- Education: University of Berne
- Occupation: Lawyer
- Years active: 1978–present
- Title: President of the Swiss Football Association
- Term: 2009–2019
- Predecessor: Ralph Zloczower

Peter Heinrich Gilliéron (born 5 May 1953 in Brescia) is a Swiss lawyer and football official. Since June 2009, he has been president of the Swiss Football Association (German: Schweizerischer Fussballverband, SFV). He is a member of the UEFA Executive Committee, chairman of UEFA's Fair Play and Social Responsibility Committee, and deputy chairman of UEFA's Legal Committee.

Gilliéron was born in Brescia. His father worked at that time in Italy as a geologist. When the family moved to Bern, he was 13 years old. After finishing school he studied jurisprudence at the University of Berne, where he completed his studies in 1978, and began working as a lawyer. From 1978 to 1982, he worked in the Federal Social Insurance Office, then moved to head of the legal department for the Swiss Cheese Union, where he was appointed deputy director in 1989.

Starting on 1 August 1993 he worked for the Swiss Football Association, where he had applied after seeing job advertisement. On 1 January 1994 he became general secretary of the association. On 15 June 2009, in the city hall of Bern, he was elected president of the SFV, succeeding Ralph Zloczower.

From 1992 to 1993, Gilliéron was president of FC Minerva Bern, which merged with FC Zähringia into FC Breitenrain Bern.

At UEFA, Gilliéron was deputy chairman of the Club Licensing Committee from 2013 to 2015, deputy chairman of the Media Committee from 201 to 2013, deputy chairman of the Players' Status, Transfer and Agents and Match Agents Committee from 2011 to 2013¸ second vice-chairman of the Stadium and Security Committee from 2009 to 2011, member of the Stadium and Security Committee from 2004 to 2009 and a member of the Development and Assistance Committee from 2000 to 2002.

He was a board member of the EURO 2008 SA.
