= FK Borac Banja Luka =

Borac Banja Luka
- Full name: Fudbalski klub Borac Banja Luka
- Nicknames: Crveno-plavi (The Red-Blues); Velikan iz Platonove (Giant from Platon St); Krajiški ponos (Pride of Krajina)
- Founded: 4 July 1926; 100 years ago
- Ground: Banja Luka City Stadium
- Capacity: 10,030
- President: Zvjezdan Misimović
- Manager: Vinko Marinović
- League: Premier League BH
- 2025–26: Premier League BH, 1st of 10 (champions)
- Website: fkborac.net
Home colours	Away colours

Fudbalski klub Borac Banja Luka pronounced [bǒːrat͡s]) is a professional football club, based in the city of Banja Luka, Republika Srpska, Bosnia and Herzegovina, and is the main part of the Borac Banja Luka Sports Society. Borac Banja Luka is one of the more popular football clubs in Bosnia and Herzegovina. The name Borac means "Fighter".

Currently, Borac is a part of the Premier League of Bosnia and Herzegovina and plays its home matches at the Banja Luka City Stadium, which has a capacity of 10,030 seats.

== History ==
=== Early years (1926–1953) ===
Borac Banja Luka's anthem

The football club Borac Banja Luka was founded on 4 July 1926. Originally it was named Radnički sportski klub Borac, which means Labour Sports Club Borac, Borac meaning "Fighter", and its roots come from the relation the club had with local labour movements during the first half of the 20th century. The club was founded by a group of football enthusiasts including the writer, activist and People's Hero of Yugoslavia Veselin Masleša, Rudolf "Rudi" Hiter, Savo Novaković, Nikola Pucar, Brane Pucar, Mustafa Softić, Nikola Kuković, Žarko Vranješević, Mile Stefanović and Brane Stefanović among others. They financed the club believing that by backing and supporting it, they would directly help promote the labor movements struggle that was underway. The name "Borac" was given by Masleša who said: "If you are going to fight for workers' rights, why don't you give the club name Borac?".

The club's first president was Rudolf Hiter, and Savo Novaković was named vice president, with a supervisory board headed by Đoko Jovanović. As football attracted more and more attention in the city on the Vrbas river, Banja Luka got the right to organise its own sub-association gathering the clubs of the entire Krajina region, a new, bigger and modern stadium was built. The opening ceremony took place on September 5, 1937, on the ground of the present-day Banja Luka City Stadium.

The club's first success in this early period came in 1928 when RSK Borac won a tournament played in Sarajevo. Before World War II, the major club in Banja Luka was ŠK Krajišnik, however, after 1945, it was disbanded, and Borac replaced Krajišnik as the city's main club. Borac played conference leagues in order to qualify for the re-established Yugoslav First League were defeated Sloboda Novi Grad 14–3 on aggregate, FK Kozara from Banja Luka with 8–4 on aggregate and Borac Kozarska Dubica 7–0 on aggregate and became Banja Luka district champions. In 1945, RSK Borac has renamed FK Borac Banja Luka and played for two years in the Yugoslav Third League, before it was promoted to the Yugoslav Second League in 1948.

=== Decades of success in the first and second league (1960–1992) ===
In 1961, Borac was promoted to the Yugoslav First League for the first time but was instantly dropped back down at the end of the season. The club had to wait for almost a decade to the return to the top flight. It was in the 1970–71 season, and the club stayed in the top league for four consecutive seasons. In this period, precisely in 1974, Borac achieved the Yugoslav Cup final. They were defeated by Hajduk Split in Belgrade, and as the runner-up, they have provided placement for the 1975–76 European Cup Winners' Cup season. In the first round of Cup Winners' Cup, Borac played against US Rumelange from Luxembourg. The first leg was played in Banja Luka where Borac recorded a record win in European competitions by a 9–0.

The second leg was won by Borac by 1–5, meaning 14–1 on aggregate, and played in the second round against R.S.C. Anderlecht. The "Red-Blues" won the home match but it was 1–3 on aggregate at the end for the Belgians, who became winners of the European Cup Winners' Cup that season. Borac Banja Luka was the only team who beat R.S.C Anderlecht in one match (at home by 1–0) during the cup season. In the 1974–75 season, Borac played in the second league, but the club achieved a quick promotion and thus ensured the beginning of a new 5-year first league period that lasted until 1980. The following nine seasons, Borac spent in the second League, before a final top league period between 1989 and 1992. Borac's best placement in the first League was in 1992, when it finished the season as 4th. In total, Borac played 487 matches in Yugoslav First League during a 46 years long period.

=== Memorable years (1988–1992) ===
==== Yugoslav Cup winner (1988) ====
From 1988 to 1992, Borac enjoyed the best period in its long history. In 1988, Borac achieved its biggest success. Under coach Husnija Fazlić Borac won the Yugoslav Cup, the second major football competition in former Yugoslav football and became the only second league club that ever achieved this. In the final, Borac defeated Yugoslav football giant Red Star by 0–1 at JNA stadium in Belgrade. The historic goal was scored by Senad Lupić, one of the Borac's legends. At the ceremony, the president of Yugoslav Football Association Antun Čilić gave the golden plaques to Borac players and the head coach. The next day, tens of thousands of Borac supporters gathered at Krajina square in Banja Luka and gave their team a hero's welcome.

11 May 1988

Borac Banja Luka (Socialist Federal Republic of Yugoslavia)	1–0	(Socialist Federal Republic of Yugoslavia) Red Star Belgrade
Lupić 60'	Report

Stadion JNA, Belgrade
Attendance: 25,000
Referee: Blažo Zuber (Bačka Topola)

BORAC BANJA LUKA:
GK	(Socialist Federal Republic of Yugoslavia) Slobodan Karalić
DF	(Socialist Federal Republic of Yugoslavia) Stojan Malbašić
DF	(Socialist Federal Republic of Yugoslavia) Mario Mataja
DF	(Socialist Federal Republic of Yugoslavia) Milorad Bilbija
DF	(Socialist Federal Republic of Yugoslavia) Zvonko Lipovac
MF	(Socialist Federal Republic of Yugoslavia) Damir Špica (c)
MF	(Socialist Federal Republic of Yugoslavia) Božur Matejić
MF	(Socialist Federal Republic of Yugoslavia) Nenad Popović
FW	(Socialist Federal Republic of Yugoslavia) Suad Beširević
FW	(Socialist Federal Republic of Yugoslavia) Amir Durgutović	(substituted off) 74'
FW	(Socialist Federal Republic of Yugoslavia) Senad Lupić	(substituted off) 88'
Substitutes:
DF	(Socialist Federal Republic of Yugoslavia) Velimir Stojnić
MF	(Socialist Federal Republic of Yugoslavia) Mile Šijaković	(substituted on) 74'
FW	(Socialist Federal Republic of Yugoslavia) Vlado Lemić	(substituted on) 88'
Manager:
(Socialist Federal Republic of Yugoslavia) Husnija Fazlić

RED STAR:
GK	(Socialist Federal Republic of Yugoslavia) Stevan Stojanović
DF	(Socialist Federal Republic of Yugoslavia) Slobodan Marović
DF	(Socialist Federal Republic of Yugoslavia) Goran Jurić
DF	(Socialist Federal Republic of Yugoslavia) Slavko Radovanović
DF	(Socialist Federal Republic of Yugoslavia) Miodrag Krivokapić
MF	(Socialist Federal Republic of Yugoslavia) Goran Milojević
MF	(Socialist Federal Republic of Yugoslavia) Robert Prosinečki
MF	(Socialist Federal Republic of Yugoslavia) Žarko Đurović	(substituted off) 71'
FW	(Socialist Federal Republic of Yugoslavia) Borislav Cvetković
FW	(Socialist Federal Republic of Yugoslavia) Dragan Stojković (c)
FW	(Socialist Federal Republic of Yugoslavia) Dragiša Binić
Substitutes:
MF	(Socialist Federal Republic of Yugoslavia) Dejan Joksimović	(substituted on) 71'
Manager:
(Socialist Federal Republic of Yugoslavia) Velibor Vasović

==== First European title (1992) ====
In 1992, Borac won its first international trophy, the Mitropa Cup. The club won the cup in the Italian city Foggia.

At that time there was an ongoing civil war in Yugoslavia, but despite that, they travelled to Italy in the hope to write history. After the elimination of U.S. Foggia in front of 30,000 spectators, Borac met in the final BVSC Budapest at Pino Zaccheria Stadium. Filipović scored but gave only a temporary advantage to Borac because the Hungarians were equalized by Tuboly. That was the result of regular time, so the winner was decided by penalties. Borac won 5–3 from the white spot and got the trophy. Sašivarević, Stavljanin, Filipović, Bilbija, and Simeunović scored for Borac, and goalkeeper Simeunović saved his goal twice. Borac head coach was Smilevski, who was recently named the member of Borac's "Best Eleven" squad in its history. Borac played a total of twelve games in UEFA competitions and has never lost a European match at its home ground. Also, seven Borac players have participated in the Yugoslav national football team in its history.

27 May 1992

Borac	1–1	(Hungary) BVSC Budapest
Filipović 4'	Report	Tuboly 63'
Penalties
Šašivarević (penalty scored); Stavljanin (penalty scored); Filipović (penalty scored); Bilbija (penalty scored); Simeunović (penalty scored)	5–3	(penalty scored) Nikiforov; (penalty scored) Iscak; (penalty scored) Nahóczky; (penalty missed) Molnár; (penalty missed) Tuboly

Pino Zaccheria Stadium
Attendance: 1,000
Referee: Steindl (Austria)

=== Recent years (2001–present) ===
The First League of the Republika Srpska was the top flight of the Republika Srpska before 2002. Borac won the Republika Srpska championship three times (2001, 2006 and 2008). Their 2008 title was won dominantly with 14 points ahead of Sloga Doboj. Borac has won five Republika Srpska Cups, in 1995 against Rudar Prijedor, 1996 against Jedinstvo Brčko, 2009 against Radnik Bijeljina, 2011 again against the club from Bijeljina and in 2012 against Sloboda Mrkonjić Grad. In 2002, the Premier League of Bosnia and Herzegovina was created as three national competitions were merged in one.

It became the country's most prestigious level of football competition. Also, since 2002, the clubs from the entire country are competing in the Bosnia and Herzegovina Football Cup. In 2010, Borac won the Bosnia and Herzegovina Cup and finished third in the national championship. During the 2010–11 UEFA Europa League season, they played in the second round against FC Lausanne-Sport but were knocked out in front of sold-out Banja Luka City Stadium with 1–2 on aggregate for the Swiss club. In 2011, Borac became the football champion of Bosnia and Herzegovina with only 4 defeats and 15 conceded goals during 30 matches. The club won also the Republika Srpska Cup. In the following 2011–12 UEFA Champions League season, Borac began its qualifying with a match against Maccabi Haifa, which they lost by 5–1. In the second leg, Borac showed great performance and won 3–2 by two goals from Krunić and one from Vidaković, however, they were eliminated. In 2012, Borac finished the national championship third and qualified for the European football competition season. Borac got Čelik Nikšić from Montenegro as their opponent. Borac was knocked out by the away goal rule (3–3a).

On 15 August 2024, Borac achieved its first-ever participation in a European club competition by defeating Faroese KÍ Klaksvík 4–3 on aggregate, thereby qualifying for at least the League phase of the third tier of continental club football in Europe. This made them only the second club from Bosnia and Herzegovina and first from Republika Srpska to compete in the group or league phase of a European competition. They then became the first club from Bosnia and Herzegovina to progress from this phase of a European competition and host European matches in the second half of their season - after finishing 20th in the table with eight points from six games, they won a subsequent two-legged playoff against NK Olimpija Ljubljana of Slovenia to reach the last 16 of the 2024–25 UEFA Conference League.

== Colours and crest ==
=== Colours ===
Borac Banja Luka's traditional home colours are red and blue with white socks (colours that are contained on civil flag of Serbs). Borac has maintained the red-blue shirt for its home kit throughout the history of the club. Its traditional away colours are all blue or all red. After a long-standing partnership with the Serbian sports clothing company NAAI, the club's kits are currently manufactured by Diadora, an Italian sports clothing company.

=== Crest ===
Borac Banja Luka's present crest contains the name of the club and the name of the City of Banja Luka. The background is formed from the sections that are coloured as the traditional flag of Serb people. On the top of the crest, the year of the club foundation is located. In addition, the whole crest is framed in gold colour.

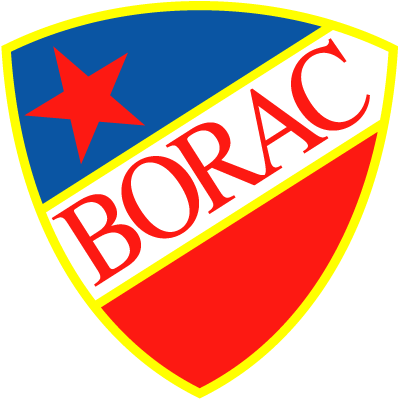
Borac's crest during the former Yugoslavia

Borac's present crest

== Stadium ==
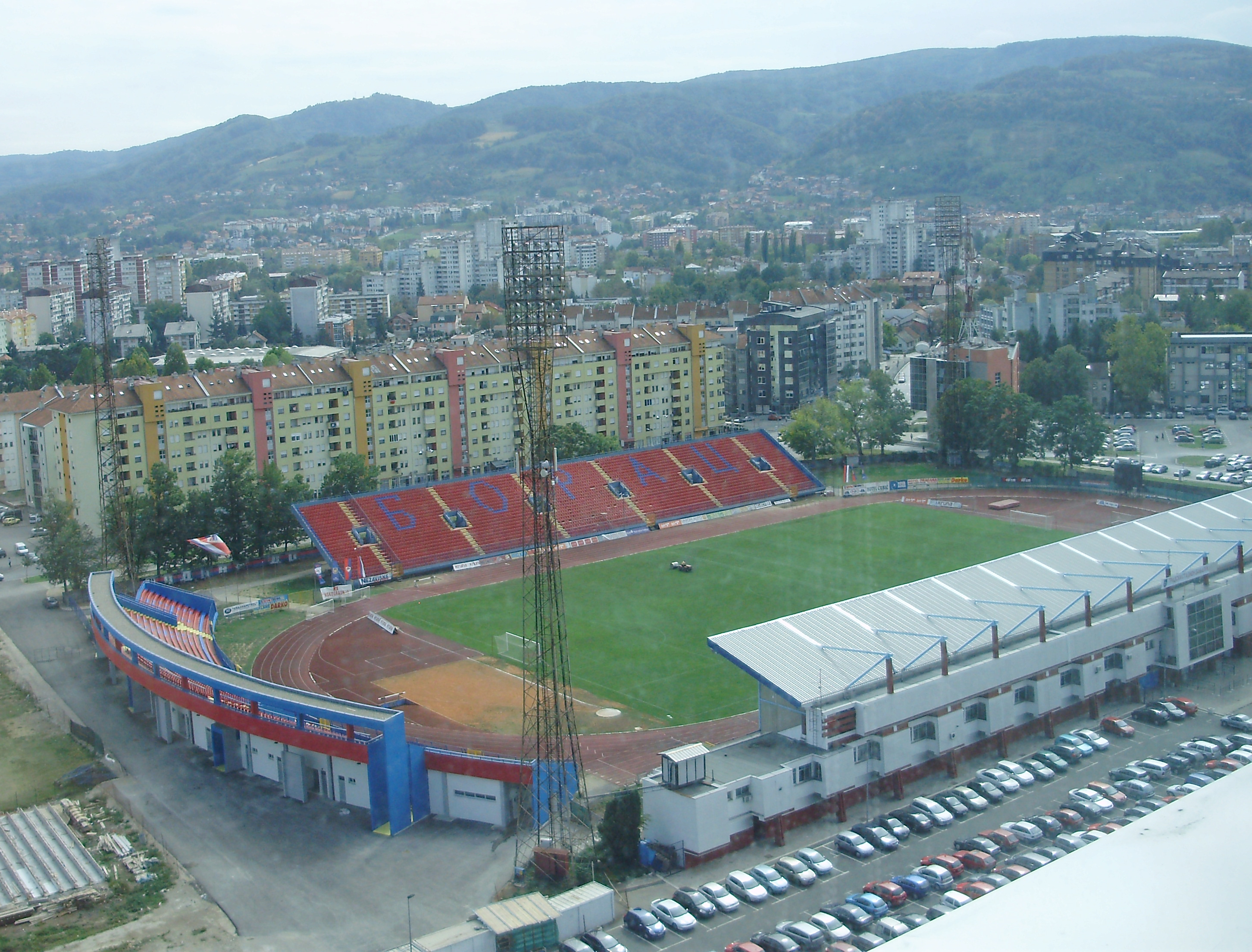
Banja Luka City Stadium in September 2012.

The home stadium of Borac is the Banja Luka City Stadium. It has 10,030 seats and is one of the most modern stadiums in the country. The stadium was built in 1937 and its main donator was Bogoljub Kujundžić, the ban of the Vrbas banovina. Since then, the stadium underwent several expansions and reconstructions in the years 1973, 1981, 2010 and 2012. In 2010, the stadium underwent a complete reconstruction. New seats were installed on east and west stands, locker rooms were renovated, a completely new VIP lounge and room for media was built, new lighting, sound systems and video surveillance were installed, and trophy and technical rooms were renovated. In 2012, the new north stand was built with a capacity of 2,492 seats, which increased the total capacity of the stadium to 9,730. According to recent plans, the east stand will be covered by a roof in the upcoming years. The construction of the south stand began, which will increase the total capacity to approximately 13,000 seats.

=== New stadium ===
In 2008, an expert committee has chosen the concept of building a new stadium. The new stadium will have 30,000 seats, and the whole complex will cover 205,000 square meters. It will include two additional football fields, tennis, basketball and volleyball courts. The cost of the whole project is estimated to be €50 million and it will meet the highest FIFA and UEFA demands.

== Supporters ==
The organized supporters of FK Borac are known as Lešinari and they are the oldest organized supporter group in Bosanska Krajina. They were established in 1987. The gathering point of the support group was the East stand of Banja Luka City Stadium until 2017 when it was changed to the North stand. Borac supporters maintain an alliance with fans of Vojvodina, known as Firma and have fraternal relations with fans of Genoa.

== Rivalries ==
=== Željezničar-Borac Banja Luka rivalry ===
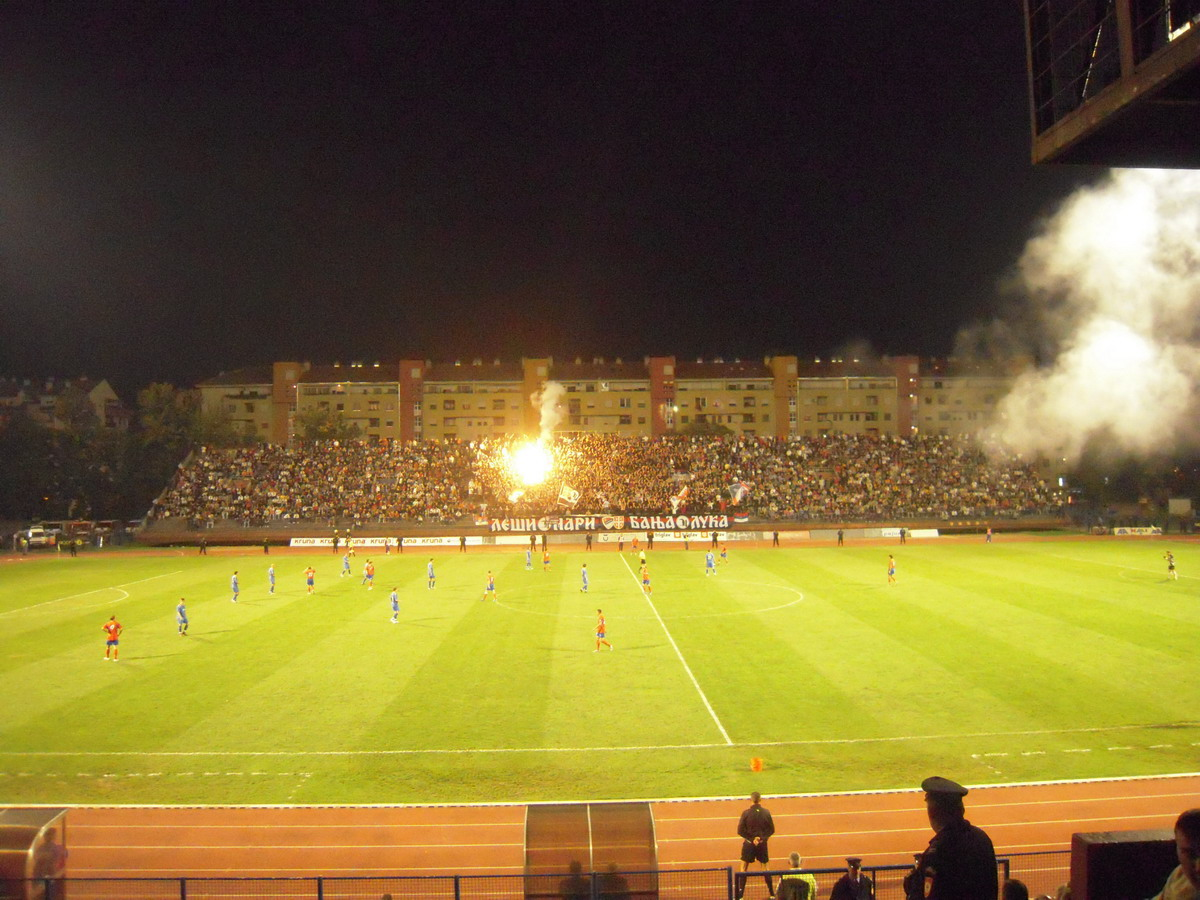
Borac's fans at a game between Borac and Željezničar in 2009.

Since the season 2008–09, the time when Borac started to be standard in the Bosnian Premier League once again, a great rivalry started to develop between them and FK Željezničar. Starting from the 2009–10 season the two teams mainly competed against each other for one of the titles (the league title or national cup) and even the attendance almost got on par with the acclaimed Sarajevo derby. The rivalry also has a root in the fact that Sarajevo and Banja Luka are, by a good margin, the two biggest cities in Bosnia and Herzegovina. Since the independence of Bosnia and Herzegovina, the teams met each other 22 times (6 of which are in a national cup), although they played the first time against each other in 1947 Yugoslav Cup. In those 22 matches, Željezničar won 12 times, while Borac managed to win 7 times, with 3 matches ending in a draw. The goal difference is 31:19 in favour of Željezničar (Not including results from the 2015 to 2016 season).

== Honours ==
Type	Competition	Titles	Seasons
Domestic	Premier League of Bosnia and Herzegovina	4	2010–11, 2020–21, 2023–24, 2025–26
Domestic	First League of Republika Srpska	5	2000–01, 2005–06, 2007–08, 2016–17, 2018–19
Domestic	Bosnia and Herzegovina Cup	1	2009–10
Domestic	Yugoslav Cup	1	1987–88
Continental	Mitropa Cup	1	1992

- record

=== Other ===
==== Domestic ====
- Republika Srpska Cup:
  - Winners (8): 1994–95, 1995–96, 2008–09, 2010–11, 2011–12, 2022–23, 2024–25, 2025–26 (record)
  - Runners-up (2): 2007–08, 2012–13

== Recent seasons ==
Season	League									CupRS	Cup	European competitions		Top goalscorer	
Season	Division	P	W	D	L	F	A	Pts	Pos	CupRS	Cup	European competitions		Player	Goals
1992–93	1st YU↓	36	6	11	19	35	64	23	19th	—N/a	—N/a	—N/a	—N/a		
1993–94	2nd YU	38						33	15th	—N/a	1/16 YU	—N/a	—N/a		
1994–95	2nd YU↓	38						39	16th	W	—N/a	—N/a	—N/a		
In summer 1995 Borac left the Football Association of Yugoslavia to join to First League of the Republika Srpska
1995–96	RS W	20	14	6	0	50	13	48	2nd	W	—N/a	—N/a	—N/a		
1996–97	RS W	22	11	6	5	32	16	39	2nd		—N/a	—N/a	—N/a		
1997–98	RS	34	18	4	12	58	34	58	2nd		—N/a	—N/a	—N/a		
1998–99	RS	34	13	6	15	44	39	45	15th		—N/a	—N/a	—N/a		
1999–00	RS	38	16	11	11	70	40	59	8th		—N/a	—N/a	—N/a		
2000–01	RS	30	20	3	7	66	22	63	1st		—N/a	—N/a	—N/a		
2001–02	RS↑	30	16	7	7	45	25	55	3rd	R2	R1	—N/a	—N/a		
2002–03	Prem	38	16	6	16	50	49	54	7th	R1	QF	—N/a	—N/a		
2003–04	Prem	30	11	6	13	40	42	39	7th	R2	RU	—N/a	—N/a		
2004–05	Prem↓	30	13	2	15	36	39	40*	15th	R2	R2	—N/a	—N/a		
2005–06	RS↑	30	19	5	6	50	19	62	1st	SF	R2	—N/a	—N/a		
2006–07	Prem↓	30	13	0	17	42	47	39	15th	R2	QF	—N/a	—N/a		
2007–08	RS↑	30	21	4	5	62	29	67	1st	RU	R1	—N/a	—N/a		
2008–09	Prem	30	15	4	11	45	26	49	5th	W	R1	—N/a	—N/a	Stojan Vranješ	5
2009–10	Prem	30	17	2	11	37	29	53	3rd	R2	W	—N/a	—N/a	Nemanja Bilbija	6
2010–11	Prem	30	19	7	4	37	15	64	1st	W	R2	Europa League	QR2	Stevo Nikolić	10
2011–12	Prem	30	17	4	9	46	26	55	3rd	W	SF	Champions League	QR2	Saša Kajkut	9
2012–13	Prem	30	14	9	7	43	25	51	3rd	RU	R1	Europa League	QR1	Joco Stokić	12
2013–14	Prem	30	13	6	11	39	32	45	6th	R1	R2	—N/a	—N/a	Joco Stokić	10
2014–15	Prem	30	14	7	9	26	26	49	5th	R2	SF	—N/a	—N/a	Joco Stokić	10
2015–16	Prem↓	30	10	6	14	27	33	36	11th	R2	QF	—N/a	—N/a	Toni Jović	6
2016–17	RS↑	32	25	6	1	61	47	81	1st	QF	R1	—N/a	—N/a	Ivan Delić	12
2017–18	Prem↓	32	10	8	14	22	31	38	9th	R2	R2	—N/a	—N/a	Petar Kunić	12
2018–19	RS↑	32	25	5	2	60	14	80	1st	QF	QF	—N/a	—N/a	Saša Kajkut	13
2019–20 (Note: 2019–20 Premier League of Bosnia and Herzegovina suspended in March 2020 due to the COVID-19 pandemic in Bosnia and Herzegovina; season curtailed and final standings (including Sarajevo as champions) declared by a points-per-game ratio on 1 June 2020.)	Prem	22	10	6	6	29	23	36	4th	R2	QF	—N/a	—N/a	Stojan Vranješ	12
2020–21	Prem	33	21	4	8	59	31	67	1st	R1	RU	Europa League	QR2	Stojan Vranješ	15
2021–22	Prem	33	13	15	5	44	34	54	3rd	SF	QF	Champions League Europa Conference League	QR1 QR2	Stojan Vranješ	10
2022–23	Prem	33	18	4	11	39	32	58	2nd	W	R2	Europa Conference League	QR1	Momčilo Mrkaić	10
2023–24	Prem	33	24	6	3	68	26	78	1st	R2	RU	Europa Conference League	QR2	Jovo Lukić	12
2024–25	Prem	33	26	3	4	58	13	81	2nd	W	SF	Champions League Europa League Conference League	QR2 PO R16	Đorđe Despotović	15
2025–26	Prem	36	27	5	4	76	20	86	1st	W	R1	Conference League	QR1	Luka Juričić	27

Key
League: P = Matches played; W = Matches won; D = Matches drawn; L = Matches lost; F = Goals for; A = Goals against; Pts = Points won; Pos = Final position;
Cup / Europe: PR = Preliminary round; QR = Qualifying round; R1 = First round; R2 = Second round; Group = Group stage; QF = Quarter-final; SF = Semi-final; RU = Runner-up; W = Competition won;

== European record ==
As of 22 October 2026

Competition	Played	Won	Drew	Lost	GF	GA	GD	Win%
UEFA Champions League	10	3	1	6	12	22	−10	30.00
UEFA Europa League	10	2	5	3	10	11	−1	20.00
UEFA Cup Winners' Cup	6	4	0	2	17	8	+9	66.67
UEFA Conference League	26	10	6	10	31	33	−2	38.46
Mitropa Cup	2	0	2	0	3	3	+0	0.00
Total	54	19	14	21	73	77	−4	35.19

Legend: GF = Goals For. GA = Goals Against. GD = Goal Difference.

=== List of matches ===
Season	Competition	Round	Opponent	Home	Away	Agg.
1975–76	Cup Winners' Cup	R1	(Luxembourg) Rumelange	9–0	5–1	14–1
1975–76	Cup Winners' Cup	R2	(Belgium) Anderlecht	1–0	0–3	1–3
1988–89	Cup Winners' Cup	R1	(Soviet Union) Metalist Kharkov	2–0	0–4	2–4
1991–92	Mitropa Cup	SF	(Italy) Foggia	2–2 (4–2 p)		
1991–92	Mitropa Cup	Final	(Hungary) Budapesti VSC	1–1 (5–3 p)		
2010–11	Europa League	2Q	(Switzerland) Lausanne-Sport	1–1	0–1	1–2
2011–12	Champions League	2Q	(Israel) Maccabi Haifa	3–2	1–5	4–7
2012–13	Europa League	1Q	(Montenegro) Čelik Nikšić	2–2	1–1	3–3 (a)
2020–21	Europa League	1Q	(Montenegro) Sutjeska Nikšić	1–0	—N/a	—N/a
2020–21	Europa League	2Q	(Portugal) Rio Ave	0−2	—N/a	—N/a
2021–22	Champions League	1Q	(Romania) CFR Cluj	2–1 (a.e.t.)	1−3	3–4
2021–22	Europa Conference League	2Q	(Northern Ireland) Linfield	0–0	0−4	0–4
2022–23	Europa Conference League	1Q	(Faroe Islands) B36 Tórshavn	2–0	1–3 (a.e.t.)	3–3 (3–4 p)
2023–24	Europa Conference League	2Q	Austria Wien	1−2	0−1	1–3
2024–25	Champions League	1Q	(Albania) Egnatia	1–0	1–2 (a.e.t.)	2–2 (4–1 p)
2024–25	Champions League	2Q	(Greece) PAOK	0−1	2−3	2–4
2024–25	Europa League	3Q	(Faroe Islands) KÍ	3–1 (a.e.t.)	1−2	4–3
2024–25	Europa League	PO	(Hungary) Ferencváros	1–1 (a.e.t.)	0–0	1–1 (2–3 p)
2024–25	Conference League	LP	(Greece) Panathinaikos	1–1	—N/a	20th out of 36
2024–25	Conference League	LP	(Cyprus) APOEL	—N/a	1–0	20th out of 36
2024–25	Conference League	LP	(Iceland) Víkingur Reykjavík	—N/a	0−2	20th out of 36
2024–25	Conference League	LP	(Austria) LASK	2–1	—N/a	20th out of 36
2024–25	Conference League	LP	(Republic of Ireland) Shamrock Rovers	—N/a	0−3	20th out of 36
2024–25	Conference League	LP	(Cyprus) Omonia	0–0	—N/a	20th out of 36
2024–25	Conference League	KPO	(Slovenia) Olimpija Ljubljana	1–0	0–0	1–0
2024–25	Conference League	R16	(Austria) Rapid Wien	1–1	1–2 (a.e.t.)	2–3
2025–26	Conference League	1Q	(Andorra) Santa Coloma	1–4	2–0	3–4
2026–27	Champions League	1Q	(Bulgaria) Levski Sofia	1–1	0–4	1–5
2026–27	Conference League	2Q	(Moldova) Petrocub Hîncești	3–0	3–3	6–3
2026–27	Conference League	3Q	(Belarus) ML Vitebsk	1–0	1–2 (a.e.t.)	2–2 (4–2 p)
2026–27	Conference League	PO	(Iceland) Víkingur Reykjavík	3–1	3–1	6–2
2026–27	Conference League	LP	(Greece) Panathinaikos	—N/a	1–2	
2026–27	Conference League	LP	(Finland) KuPS	2–0	—N/a	
2026–27	Conference League	LP	(Sweden) Mjällby AIF	—N/a		
2026–27	Conference League	LP	(Italy) Atalanta		—N/a	
2026–27	Conference League	LP	(Scotland) Heart of Midlothian	—N/a		
2026–27	Conference League	LP	(Latvia) Riga		—N/a	

== Club ranking ==
=== UEFA coefficient ===
As of 30 May 2026

Rank	Team	Points
140	(Bosnia and Herzegovina) Borac Banja Luka	13.125
141	(Belgium) Cercle Brugge	12.750
142	(Latvia) RFS	12.500
143	(Switzerland) Servette	12.500
144	(Kazakhstan) Astana	12.500

== Players ==
=== Current squad ===
As of 14 November 2026

Note: Flags indicate national team as defined under FIFA eligibility rules; some limited exceptions apply. Players may hold more than one non-FIFA nationality.

No.	Pos.	Nation	Player
1	GK	MKD	Damjan Shishkovski
2	DF	NED	Bart Meijers
3	DF	ESP	Abel Pascual
4	DF	BIH	Branimir Cipetić
6	DF	BIH	Siniša Saničanin
7	FW	BIH	Luka Juričić
9	FW	CRO	Karlo Perić
10	MF	BIH	David Vuković
12	MF	BIH	Amer Hiroš
13	MF	NGR	Anderson Esiti
14	FW	BIH	Pavle Đajić
15	MF	BIH	Srđan Grahovac (captain)
16	DF	MKD	Sebastián Herrera
17	MF	MNE	Omar Sijarić
18	MF	SRB	Miloš Jojić
19	DF	SRB	Viktor Rogan

No.	Pos.	Nation	Player
20	DF	CRO	Erik Riđan
21	GK	BIH	Nikola Ćetković
22	MF	CRO	Ivan Kukavica
23	MF	BIH	Stojan Vranješ (vice-captain)
24	DF	CUW	Jurich Carolina
30	DF	SRB	Nemanja Jakšić
36	FW	SRB	Nikola Terzić
44	MF	CRO	Ante Roguljić
47	MF	BIH	Amar Milak
72	GK	BIH	Mladen Jurkas
77	MF	AUT	Stefan Savić
89	FW	BIH	Matej Deket
93	FW	BIH	Petar Kunić
98	MF	SLO	Sandi Ogrinec
99	FW	ESP	Dani Romera
—	FW	LUX	Alessio Curci

=== Out on loan ===
Note: Flags indicate national team as defined under FIFA eligibility rules; some limited exceptions apply. Players may hold more than one non-FIFA nationality.

No.	Pos.	Nation	Player
—	GK	BIH	Srđan Modić (at BSK until 30 June 2027)
—	DF	BIH	Nikola Antešević (at BSK until 30 June 2027)
—	DF	CRO	Domagoj Čulina (at BSK until 30 June 2027)

No.	Pos.	Nation	Player
—	DF	SEN	Cherif Diouf (at BSK until 30 June 2027)
—	DF	BIH	Jusuf Terzić (at BSK until 30 June 2027)
—	MF	SRB	Ognjen Radošević (at BSK until 30 June 2027)

=== Retired numbers ===
No.	Player	Position	Borac debut	Last match
8	(Bosnia and Herzegovina) Mladen Žižović	MF	17 March 2012	22 November 2014

On 4 November 2025, Borac retired squad number 8 in memory of Mladen Žižović, the club's former player and manager who had died while managing Radnički 1923 in Serbia the previous day.

== Technical staff ==
Current staff
- Sporting director: (Bosnia and Herzegovina) Oliver Jandrić
- Club representative: (Bosnia and Herzegovina) Stojan Malbašić
- Head coach: (Bosnia and Herzegovina) Vinko Marinović
- Assistant coach: (Bosnia and Herzegovina) Danimir Milkanović
- Coach: (Bosnia and Herzegovina) Boris Raspudić
- Coach: (Bosnia and Herzegovina) Igor Mirković
- Strength & conditioning coach: (Bosnia and Herzegovina) Čedomir Ćulum
- Goalkeeper coach: (Bosnia and Herzegovina) Siniša Mrkobrada
- Goalkeeper coach: (Bosnia and Herzegovina) Almir Đonlić
- Medical staff: (Bosnia and Herzegovina) Vladimir Pilipović
- Medical staff: (Bosnia and Herzegovina) Nikola Vučenović
- Medical staff: (Bosnia and Herzegovina) Branko Božić
- Doctor: (Bosnia and Herzegovina) Nemanja Tomić
- Econom: (Bosnia and Herzegovina) Dragan Đuranović

== Club management ==
Current management
- President: (Bosnia and Herzegovina) Zvjezdan Misimović
- Vice-president: (Bosnia and Herzegovina) Bogoljub Zeljković
- Managing director: (Bosnia and Herzegovina) Dejan Čato
- Technical director: (Bosnia and Herzegovina) Saša Kajkut
- General secretary: (Bosnia and Herzegovina) Nemanja Dojčinović
- PR & marketing manager: (Bosnia and Herzegovina) Olivera Savanović
- Board members:
- (Bosnia and Herzegovina) Goran Lukić
- (Bosnia and Herzegovina) Slobodan Stanarević
- (Bosnia and Herzegovina) Nenad Talić
- (Bosnia and Herzegovina) Branko Vještica
- (Bosnia and Herzegovina) Duško Tadić

== Former players and current players at the World Cup ==
=== World Cup players ===
(Brazil) 2014 FIFA World Cup

- (Bosnia and Herzegovina) Asmir Avdukić

(Canada) (Mexico) (United States) 2026 FIFA World Cup

- (Bosnia and Herzegovina) Mladen Jurkas

== Managerial history ==
- (Socialist Federal Republic of Yugoslavia) Mirko Kokotović (1959–1962)
- (Socialist Federal Republic of Yugoslavia) Krešimir Arapović (1969–1971)
- (Socialist Federal Republic of Yugoslavia) Ilija Miljuš (1971)
- (Socialist Federal Republic of Yugoslavia) Božidar Drenovac (1971–1972)
- (Socialist Federal Republic of Yugoslavia) Ilija Miljuš (1972)
- (Socialist Federal Republic of Yugoslavia) Gojko Zec (1972–1973)
- (Socialist Federal Republic of Yugoslavia) Ivan Čabrinović (1973–1974)
- (Socialist Federal Republic of Yugoslavia) Boris Marović (1974–1975)
- (Socialist Federal Republic of Yugoslavia) Miljenko Mihić (1975–1976)
- (Socialist Federal Republic of Yugoslavia) Momčilo Spasojević (1976–1977)
- (Socialist Federal Republic of Yugoslavia) Ilija Miljuš (1977–1978)
- (Socialist Federal Republic of Yugoslavia) Mirko Bazić (1978–1980)
- (Socialist Federal Republic of Yugoslavia) Dušan Drašković (1980)
- (Socialist Federal Republic of Yugoslavia) Marko Valok (1981)
- (Socialist Federal Republic of Yugoslavia) Husnija Fazlić (1981–1982)
- (Socialist Federal Republic of Yugoslavia) Ilija Miljuš (1982–1983)
- (Socialist Federal Republic of Yugoslavia) Husnija Fazlić (1983–1984)
- (Socialist Federal Republic of Yugoslavia) Zoran Smileski (1984)
- (Socialist Federal Republic of Yugoslavia) Đorđe Gerum (1984–1985)
- (Socialist Federal Republic of Yugoslavia) Ilija Miljuš (1985–1986)
- (Socialist Federal Republic of Yugoslavia) Husnija Fazlić (1986–1988)
- (Socialist Federal Republic of Yugoslavia) Josip Kuže (1988–1989)
- (Socialist Federal Republic of Yugoslavia) Stanko Poklepović (1989–1990)
- (Socialist Federal Republic of Yugoslavia) Vladica Popović (1990–1991)
- (Federal Republic of Yugoslavia) Zoran Smileski (1991–1993)
- (Federal Republic of Yugoslavia) Vladimir Petrović (1993)
- (Bosnia and Herzegovina) Slobodan Karalić (2002)
- (Bosnia and Herzegovina) Stojan Malbašić (2002 – March 2003)
- (Bosnia and Herzegovina) Borče Sredojević (2003)
- (Serbia and Montenegro) Nikola Rakojević (2003 – June 2004)
- (Bosnia and Herzegovina) Dragan Vukša (June 2004 – 2004)
- (Bosnia and Herzegovina) Slavoljub Stojanović (2004–2005)
- (North Macedonia) Zoran Smileski (2005 – June 2006)
- (Bosnia and Herzegovina) Mihajlo Bošnjak (June 2006 – March 2007)
- (Serbia) Stanislav Karasi (March 2007 – June 2007)
- (Bosnia and Herzegovina) Milomir Odović (September 2007 – September 2008)
- (Bosnia and Herzegovina) Vlado Jagodić (16 September 2008 – 11 June 2009)
- (Bosnia and Herzegovina) Velimir Stojnić (1 July 2009 – 11 January 2010)
- (Serbia) Zoran Marić (12 January 2010 – 2 August 2010)
- (Bosnia and Herzegovina) Vlado Jagodić (3 August 2010 – 4 June 2011)
- (Croatia) Zvjezdan Cvetković (4 June 2011 – 3 October 2011)
- (Bosnia and Herzegovina) Velimir Stojnić (3 October 2011 – 17 March 2012)
- (Serbia) Slaviša Božičić (19 March 2012 – 13 July 2012)
- (Bosnia and Herzegovina) Slobodan Starčević (18 July 2012 – 20 May 2013)
- (Bosnia and Herzegovina) Dragan Jović (25 June 2013 – 18 March 2014)
- (Bosnia and Herzegovina) Vinko Marinović (18 March 2014 – 25 March 2015)
- (Bosnia and Herzegovina) Vlado Jagodić (27 March 2015 – 31 August 2015)
- (Serbia) Petar Kurćubić (3 September 2015 – 28 October 2015)
- (Bosnia and Herzegovina) Željko Vranješ (29 October 2015 – 31 December 2015)
- (Serbia) Aleksandar Janjić (21 January 2016 – 6 March 2016)
- (Bosnia and Herzegovina) Borče Sredojević (6 March 2016 – 20 May 2016)
- (Bosnia and Herzegovina) Zoran Dragišić (20 May 2016 – 23 August 2016)
- (Bosnia and Herzegovina) Vlado Jagodić (23 August 2016 – 10 October 2016)
- (Bosnia and Herzegovina) Vule Trivunović (11 October 2016 – 26 May 2017)
- (Bosnia and Herzegovina) Marko Tešić (caretaker) (26 May 2017 – 7 June 2017)
- (Bosnia and Herzegovina) Željko Vranješ (8 June 2017 – 30 August 2017)
- (Serbia) Zoran Milinković (30 August 2017 – 22 November 2017)
- (Bosnia and Herzegovina) Igor Janković (caretaker) (22 November 2017 – 10 January 2018)
- (Bosnia and Herzegovina) Igor Janković (10 January 2018 – 12 March 2018)
- (Bosnia and Herzegovina) Marko Maksimović (caretaker) (13 March 2018 – 22 March 2018)
- (Bosnia and Herzegovina) Darko Vojvodić (22 March 2018 – 5 June 2019)
- (Bosnia and Herzegovina) Branislav Krunić (9 June 2019 – 5 March 2020)
- (Bosnia and Herzegovina) Vlado Jagodić (5 March 2020 – 21 December 2020)
- (Bosnia and Herzegovina) Marko Maksimović (26 December 2020 – 28 July 2021)
- (Serbia) Zoran Milinković (30 July 2021 – 18 August 2021)
- (Sweden) Nemanja Miljanović (18 August 2021 – 3 April 2022)
- (Croatia) Tomislav Ivković (4 April 2022 – 3 June 2022)
- (Serbia) Nenad Lalatović (10 June 2022 – 26 August 2022)
- (Bosnia and Herzegovina) Vinko Marinović (28 August 2022 – 11 June 2024)
- (Bosnia and Herzegovina) Mladen Žižović (11 June 2024 – 18 July 2025)
- (Bosnia and Herzegovina) Vinko Marinović (21 July 2025 – present)

== Kit suppliers and shirt sponsors ==
Period	Kit manufactured	Shirt sponsor
—2009	NAAI	
2010—2016	NAAI	m:tel
2016—2017	Diadora	m:tel
2017—2019	Diadora	Nova banka
2019—2020	Kelme	Prointer
2020—2025	Kelme	m:tel
2025—present	Kelme	m:tel Mozzart
