= Husnija Fazlić =

Yugoslav footballer (1943–2022)

Personal information
- Date of birth: 3 January 1943
- Place of birth: Kozarac, Independent State of Croatia
- Date of death: 6 October 2022 (aged 79)
- Place of death: Bremen, Germany
- Position: Attacking midfielder

Youth career
- Bratstvo Kozarac

Senior career*
Years	Team	Apps	(Gls)
1961–1963	BSK Banja Luka		
1963–1974	Borac Banja Luka	396	(93)
1974–1976	1. FC Saarbrücken	48	(19)

Managerial career
- 1981–1982: Borac Banja Luka
- 1983–1984: Borac Banja Luka
- 1986–1988: Borac Banja Luka
- 1995–1997: Türkiyemspor Berlin
- 1997–1998: SD Croatia Berlin
- * Club domestic league appearances and goals

Husnija Fazlić (3 January 1943 – 6 October 2022) was a Bosnian football player and manager. He was a scout for Werder Bremen.

== Club career ==
Fazlić played for Borac Banja Luka in the Yugoslav First League. He finished his career playing for Germany's 2. Bundesliga team 1. FC Saarbrücken.

== Managerial career ==
Fazlić managed Borac Banja Luka in the Yugoslav First League and led the team to their first Yugoslav trophy winning the Yugoslav Cup in 1988. During his time as manager Borac enjoyed the best period in its long history.

== Scouting career at Werder Bremen ==
Fazlić joined Bundesliga club Werder Bremen as an assistant manager to Felix Magath in early 1999. He remained with the club when Magath left. He went on to become a scout at Werder Bremen where he recommended players such Diego and Naldo. He left the club in 2014.

== Personal life and death ==
Fazlić died on 6 October 2022, at the age of 79. His son Dino Fazlic is also a footballer.

== Honours ==
=== Manager ===
Borac Banja Luka

- Yugoslav Cup: 1987–88
