= Senad Lupić =

Bosnian retired footballer (born 1966)

Personal information
- Full name: Senad Lupić
- Date of birth: 28 March 1966 (age 60)
- Place of birth: Derventa, FPR Yugoslavia
- Height: 1.80 m (5 ft 11 in)
- Position: Striker

Youth career
- 1978–1981: FK Tekstilac Derventa

Senior career*
Years	Team	Apps	(Gls)
1981–1983	Kozara Gradiška	48	(12)
1983–1985	Iskra Bugojno	18	(15)
1985–1989	Borac Banja Luka	150	(104)
1989–1991	FC Gueugnon	30	(13)
1991–1992	Borac Banja Luka	3	(3)
- * Club domestic league appearances and goals

Senad Lupić (born 28 March 1966) is a Bosnian retired footballer.

== Club career ==
During his club career he first played for suburb club NK Polet Omeragići where he was born and soon after he was spotted by town club FK Tekstilac Derventa. Later after try out in Germany with NK Dinamo Zagreb he moved to FK Kozara Gradiška, NK Iskra Bugojno, FK Borac Banja Luka and finally in FC Gueugnon. Reference

He is famous for scoring the winning goal in 1988 Yugoslav Cup final in which FK Borac Banja Luka played against FK Crvena Zvezda and won 1:0.
