= 2023–24 HŠK Zrinjski Mostar season =

Zrinjski Mostar
2023–24 season
- Manager: Krunoslav Rendulić (until 18 November 2023); Mario Ivanković (caretaker, from 20 November 2023 to 5 January 2024); Željko Petrović (from 5 January 2024)
- Stadium: Stadion pod Bijelim Brijegom
- Bosnian Premier League: 2nd
- Bosnian Cup: Winners
- UEFA Champions League: Second qualifying round
- UEFA Europa League: Play-off round
- UEFA Europa Conference League: Group stage
- Top goalscorer: League: Nemanja Bilbija (24); All: Nemanja Bilbija (29)
- Average home league attendance: 2,335
- Biggest win: 6–0 v Čelik Zenica (Away, 2 November 2023, Bosnian Cup)
- Biggest defeat: 0–3 v Velež Mostar (Away, 13 November 2023, Bosnian Premier League)
| Home colours | Away colours |

The 2023–24 season was Hrvatski športski klub Zrinjski Mostar's 24th consecutive season in the Bosnian Premier League. In addition to the domestic league, Zrinjski Mostar participated in the Bosnian Cup, the UEFA Champions League, the UEFA Europa League and the UEFA Europa Conference League.

== Squad ==
As of 13 April 2024

Note: Flags indicate national team as defined under FIFA eligibility rules; some limited exceptions apply. Players may hold more than one non-FIFA nationality.

| No. | Pos. | Nation | Player |
|---|---|---|---|
| 1 | GK | BIH | Anis Sefo |
| 3 | DF | CRO | Filip Brekalo (on loan from Dinamo Zagreb) |
| 4 | DF | BIH | Hrvoje Barišić |
| 6 | DF | BIH | Josip Ćorluka |
| 7 | MF | BIH | Ivan Jukić |
| 8 | MF | BIH | Damir Zlomislić |
| 9 | FW | BIH | Franko Sabljić |
| 10 | FW | CRO | Tomislav Kiš |
| 11 | FW | BIH | Nardin Mulahusejnović |
| 12 | GK | BIH | Antonio Soldo |
| 17 | FW | CRO | Matija Malekinušić |
| 18 | GK | BIH | Goran Karačić |
| 19 | MF | BIH | Tarik Ramić |
| 20 | MF | CRO | Antonio Ivančić |
| 21 | MF | BIH | Igor Savić |

| No. | Pos. | Nation | Player |
|---|---|---|---|
| 22 | MF | BIH | Aldin Hrvanović |
| 25 | FW | CRO | Mario Ćuže |
| 26 | MF | CRO | Filip Bradarić |
| 27 | DF | SRB | Slobodan Jakovljević (Vice-captain) |
| 35 | GK | CRO | Marko Marić |
| 40 | MF | BIH | Silvio Ilinković (on loan from Rijeka) |
| 42 | MF | CRO | Luka Lukanić (on loan from Dinamo Zagreb) |
| 44 | DF | BIH | Toni Šunjić |
| 50 | DF | BIH | Kerim Memija |
| 60 | DF | ARG | Sebastián Corda |
| 70 | DF | CRO | Marin Magdić |
| 77 | FW | MKD | Besart Abdurahimi |
| 91 | DF | CRO | Mario Tičinović |
| 99 | FW | BIH | Nemanja Bilbija (Captain) |

== Competitions ==
=== Overview ===
| Competition | First match | Last match | Starting round | Final position | Record | | | | | | | |
| Competition | First match | Last match | Starting round | Final position | Pld | W | D | L | GF | GA | GD | Win % |
|---|---|---|---|---|---|---|---|---|---|---|---|---|
| Bosnian Premier League | 20 August 2023 | 26 May 2024 | Matchday 1 | 2nd | 33 | 24 | 4 | 5 | 76 | 27 | +49 | 72.73 |
| Bosnian Cup | 2 November 2023 | 23 May 2024 | First round | Winners | 8 | 7 | 1 | 0 | 17 | 0 | +17 | 87.50 |
| UEFA Champions League | 11 July 2023 | 1 August 2023 | First qualifying round | Second qualifying round | 4 | 1 | 1 | 2 | 5 | 6 | −1 | 25.00 |
| UEFA Europa League | 10 August 2023 | 31 August 2023 | Third qualifying round | Play-off round | 4 | 1 | 1 | 2 | 8 | 6 | +2 | 25.00 |
| UEFA Europa Conference League | 21 September 2023 | 14 December 2023 | Group stage | Group stage | 6 | 1 | 1 | 4 | 6 | 10 | −4 | 16.67 |
| Total | | | | | 55 | 34 | 8 | 13 | 112 | 49 | +63 | 61.82 |

Source: Competitions

=== Premier League of Bosnia and Herzegovina ===
==== League table ====
| Pos | Team | Pld | W | D | L | GF | GA | GD | Pts | Qualification or relegation |
|---|---|---|---|---|---|---|---|---|---|---|
| 1 | Borac Banja Luka (C) | 33 | 24 | 6 | 3 | 68 | 26 | +42 | 78 | Qualification for the Champions League first qualifying round |
| 2 | Zrinjski Mostar | 33 | 24 | 4 | 5 | 76 | 27 | +49 | 76 | Qualification to Conference League second qualifying round (Note: Since the winners of the 2023–24 Bosnian Cup, Zrinjski, finished in the top two of the Premier League, the Conference League first qualifying round spot was passed to the fourth-placed team.) |
| 3 | Velež Mostar | 33 | 16 | 11 | 6 | 50 | 28 | +22 | 59 | Qualification to Conference League first qualifying round |
| 4 | Sarajevo | 33 | 16 | 8 | 9 | 57 | 38 | +19 | 53 (Note: Sarajevo were deducted 3 points for having its players leave the pitch in protest of multiple officiating decisions during a Bosnian Cup game against Borac.) | Qualification to Conference League first qualifying round |
| 5 | Posušje | 33 | 13 | 9 | 11 | 35 | 29 | +6 | 48 | |

Source: Rezultati.com
Rules for classification: 1) Points; 2) Goal difference; 3) Goals scored; 4) Head-to-head points; 5) Head-to-head goal difference; 6) Head-to-head away goals (only if two teams); 7) Head-to-head goals scored; 8) Goal difference; 9) Play-off. (Criteria 2 and 3 are not used to decide champion, UEFA competition qualification, or relegation)
(C) Champions

==== Results summary ====
| Overall | | | | | | | | Home | | | | | | Away | | | | | |
| Pld | W | D | L | GF | GA | GD | Pts | W | D | L | GF | GA | GD | W | D | L | GF | GA | GD |
|---|---|---|---|---|---|---|---|---|---|---|---|---|---|---|---|---|---|---|---|
| 33 | 24 | 4 | 5 | 76 | 27 | +49 | 76 | 15 | 0 | 2 | 46 | 12 | +34 | 9 | 4 | 3 | 30 | 15 | +15 |

Source: Soccerway

==== Results by round ====
| Round | 1 | 2 | 3 | 4 | 5 | 6 | 7 | 8 | 9 | 10 | 11 | 12 | 13 | 14 | 15 | 16 | 17 | 18 | 19 | 20 | 21 | 22 | 23 | 24 | 25 | 26 | 27 | 28 | 29 | 30 | 31 | 32 | 33 |
|---|---|---|---|---|---|---|---|---|---|---|---|---|---|---|---|---|---|---|---|---|---|---|---|---|---|---|---|---|---|---|---|---|---|
| Ground | H | A | H | H | H | H | A | H | A | H | A | A | H | A | A | A | A | H | A | H | A | H | H | A | H | H | A | H | A | H | A | H | A |
| Result | L | W | W | W | W | W | L | W | W | W | D | D | W | L | W | L | W | W | D | W | D | L | W | W | W | W | W | W | W | W | W | W | W |
| Position | 9 | 5 | 1 | 1 | 1 | 1 | 2 | 2 | 2 | 2 | 2 | 2 | 2 | 2 | 2 | 2 | 2 | 2 | 2 | 2 | 2 | 2 | 2 | 2 | 2 | 2 | 2 | 2 | 2 | 2 | 2 | 2 | 2 |
| Points | 0 | 3 | 6 | 9 | 12 | 15 | 15 | 18 | 21 | 24 | 25 | 26 | 29 | 29 | 32 | 32 | 35 | 38 | 39 | 42 | 43 | 43 | 46 | 49 | 52 | 55 | 58 | 61 | 64 | 67 | 70 | 73 | 76 |

Source: Worldfootball
A = Away; H = Home; W = Win; D = Draw; L = Loss

==== Matches ====
| 20 August 2023 4 | Zrinjski Mostar | 3–1 | GOŠK Gabela | Mostar |
| 20:00 CEST (UTC+2) | Bilbija 37' (pen.), 43'; Malekinušić 75' | Report | Musulin 30' | Stadium: Stadion pod Bijelim Brijegom; Attendance: 3,000; Referee: M. Musa |

| 27 August 2023 5 | Zrinjski Mostar | 5–3 | Zvijezda 09 | Mostar |
| 19:45 CEST (UTC+2) | Ivančić 5'; Bilbija 8', 51', 74'; Malekinušić 24' | Report | Veličković 2'; Saliman 41'; Maksimović 90' | Stadium: Stadion pod Bijelim Brijegom; Attendance: 1,500; Referee: E. Sivac |

| 13 September 2023 1 | Zrinjski Mostar | 0–1 | Posušje | Mostar |
| 18:30 CEST (UTC+2) | | Report | Boban 10' | Stadium: Stadion pod Bijelim Brijegom; Attendance: 3,000; Referee: A. Music |

| 16 September 2023 7 | Sarajevo | 1–0 | Zrinjski Mostar | Sarajevo |
| 20:45 CEST (UTC+2) | Renan Oliveira 90' (pen.) | Report | | Stadium: Koševo City Stadium; Attendance: 8,200; Referee: L. Bilbija |

| 24 September 2023 8 | Zrinjski Mostar | 2–1 | Željezničar | Mostar |
| 19:45 CEST (UTC+2) | Jakovljević 78'; Mišić 90+2' | Report | Jašarević 30' | Stadium: Stadion pod Bijelim Brijegom; Attendance: 3,500; Referee: D. Gedzic |

| 27 September 2023 2 | Tuzla City | 2–4 | Zrinjski Mostar | Tuzla |
| 15:00 CEST (UTC+2) | Jakovljević 48' (o.g.); Pantelić 74' | Report | Ćuže 25'; Bilbija 67'; Ramić 71'; Kiš 80' | Stadium: Tušanj City Stadium; Attendance: 350; Referee: I. Peljto |

| 1 October 2023 9 | Igman Konjic | 0–2 | Zrinjski Mostar | Konjic |
| 15:00 CEST (UTC+2) | | Report | Kiš 9', 43' | Stadium: Konjic City Stadium; Attendance: 1,500; Referee: A. Bandic |

| 9 October 2023 10 | Zrinjski Mostar | 2–0 | Sloga Doboj | Mostar |
| 18:00 CEST (UTC+2) | Kiš 29'; Jukić 86' | Report | | Stadium: Stadion pod Bijelim Brijegom; Attendance: 2,500; Referee: F. Jelic |

| 18 October 2023 3 | Zrinjski Mostar | 3–0 | Velež Mostar | Mostar |
| 16:30 CEST (UTC+2) | Ćuže 6'; Jakovljević 36', 45' | Report | | Stadium: Stadion pod Bijelim Brijegom; Attendance: 4,700; Referee: D. Gedzic |

| 22 October 2023 11 | Borac Banja Luka | 0–0 | Zrinjski Mostar | Banja Luka |
| 19:45 CEST (UTC+2) | | Report | | Stadium: Banja Luka City Stadium; Attendance: 7,000; Referee: I. Peljto |

| 29 October 2023 12 | Posušje | 2–2 | Zrinjski Mostar | Posušje |
| 18:40 CET (UTC+1) | I. Marić 24'; Begić 45+3' | Report | Bilbija 2'; Ivančić 34' | Stadium: Mokri Dolac Stadium; Attendance: 3,500; Referee: E. Sivac |

| 5 November 2023 13 | Zrinjski Mostar | 3–1 | Tuzla City | Mostar |
| 13:00 CET (UTC+1) | Bilbija 33' (pen.); Ćuže 62'; Prskalo 77' | Report | Mehanović 70' | Stadium: Stadion pod Bijelim Brijegom; Attendance: 1,000; Referee: F. Jelic |

| 13 November 2023 14 | Velež Mostar | 3–0 | Zrinjski Mostar | Mostar |
| 18:00 CET (UTC+1) | Haskić 42'; Guliashvili 53', 79' | Report | | Stadium: Stadion Rođeni; Attendance: 4,000; Referee: I. Peljto |

| 22 November 2023 6 | Zrinjski Mostar | 3–1 | Široki Brijeg | Mostar |
| 18:00 CET (UTC+1) | Ćorluka 10'; Bilbija 13', 45' | Report | Ćavar 23' | Stadium: Stadion pod Bijelim Brijegom; Attendance: 1,000; Referee: A. Bandic |

| 26 November 2023 15 | GOŠK Gabela | 1–5 | Zrinjski Mostar | Gabela |
| 15:00 CET (UTC+1) | Šuta 85' | Report | Bilbija 11' (pen.), 81'; Kiš 37'; Ramić 46'; Sabljić 83' | Stadium: Stadium Perica-Pero Pavlović; Attendance: 650; Referee: M. Musa |

| 4 December 2023 16 | Zvijezda 09 | 2–1 | Zrinjski Mostar | Ugljevik |
| 13:00 CET (UTC+1) | Vukoja 50'; Saliman 67' | Report | Bilbija 55' (pen.) | Stadium: Ugljevik City Stadium; Attendance: 270; Referee: N. Ljajic |

| 10 December 2023 17 | Široki Brijeg | 0–2 | Zrinjski Mostar | Široki Brijeg |
| 15:15 CET (UTC+1) | | Report | Ivančić 33'; Bilbija 57' | Stadium: Stadion Pecara; Attendance: 500; Referee: D. Gedzic |

| 18 December 2023 18 | Zrinjski Mostar | 2–0 | Sarajevo | Mostar |
| 18:00 CET (UTC+1) | Bilbija 40'; Zlomislić 44' | Report | | Stadium: Stadion pod Bijelim Brijegom; Attendance: 3,000; Referee: I. Peljto |

| 17 February 2024 19 | Željezničar | 0–0 | Zrinjski Mostar | Sarajevo |
| 16:00 CET (UTC+1) | | Report | | Stadium: Stadion Grbavica; Attendance: 9,877; Referee: E. Sivac |

| 25 February 2024 20 | Zrinjski Mostar | 5–0 | Igman Konjic | Mostar |
| 15:00 CET (UTC+1) | Kiš 29'; Tičinović 32'; Bilbija 36' (pen.); Malekinušić 38'; Barišić 78' | Report | | Stadium: Stadion pod Bijelim Brijegom; Attendance: 500; Referee: M. Musa |

| 2 March 2024 21 | Sloga Doboj | 1–1 | Zrinjski Mostar | Modriča |
| 16:00 CET (UTC+1) | Grabež 90+6' | Report | Bilbija 80' (pen.) | Stadium: Stadion Dr. Milan Jelić; Attendance: 800; Referee: A. Bandic |

| 10 March 2024 22 | Zrinjski Mostar | 0–1 | Borac Banja Luka | Mostar |
| 19:00 CET (UTC+1) | | Report | Vuković 33' | Stadium: Stadion pod Bijelim Brijegom; Attendance: 2,000; Referee: I. Peljto |

| 16 March 2024 23 | Zrinjski Mostar | 2–0 | Željezničar | Mostar |
| 16:00 CET (UTC+1) | Mulahusejnović 79'; Ćuže 89' | Report | | Stadium: Stadion pod Bijelim Brijegom; Attendance: 1,500; Referee: D. Gedzic |

| 30 March 2024 24 | Borac Banja Luka | 1–2 | Zrinjski Mostar | Banja Luka |
| 16:00 CET (UTC+1) | Čelić 90' | Report | Ramić 38'; Kiš 51' | Stadium: Banja Luka City Stadium; Attendance: 5,000; Referee: E. Sivac |

| 8 April 2024 25 | Zrinjski Mostar | 4–0 | Zvijezda 09 | Mostar |
| 18:00 CEST (UTC+2) | Ćuže 8', 15'; Bilbija 36', 76' | Report | | Stadium: Stadion pod Bijelim Brijegom; Attendance: 2,000; Referee: N. Ljajic |

| 13 April 2024 26 | Zrinjski Mostar | 1–0 | Velež Mostar | Mostar |
| 16:00 CEST (UTC+2) | Ćuže 9' | Report | | Stadium: Stadion pod Bijelim Brijegom; Attendance: 5,500; Referee: I. Peljto |

| 20 April 2024 27 | Sloga Doboj | 0–2 | Zrinjski Mostar | Modriča |
| 16:00 CEST (UTC+2) | | Report | Bilbija 52', 77' | Stadium: Stadion Dr. Milan Jelić; Attendance: 200; Referee: N. Ljajic |

| 24 April 2024 28 | Zrinjski Mostar | 4–3 | Sarajevo | Mostar |
| 20:30 CEST (UTC+2) | Ilinković 10', 21'; Ćuže 14'; Bilbija 58' | Report | Čataković 45'; Renan Oliveira 56'; Anđušić 86' | Stadium: Stadion pod Bijelim Brijegom; Attendance: 1,500; Referee: L. Bilbija |

| 28 April 2024 29 | Posušje | 0–1 | Zrinjski Mostar | Posušje |
| 17:00 CEST (UTC+2) | | Report | Bilbija 32' (pen.) | Stadium: Mokri Dolac Stadium; Attendance: 4,000; Referee: I. Peljto |

| 3 May 2024 30 | Zrinjski Mostar | 3–0 | Široki Brijeg | Mostar |
| 20:30 CEST (UTC+2) | Bilbija 20' (pen.); Magdić 23'; Kozina 89' (pen.) | Report | | Stadium: Stadion pod Bijelim Brijegom; Attendance: 2,000; Referee: A. Bandic |

| 13 May 2024 31 | GOŠK Gabela | 1–4 | Zrinjski Mostar | Gabela |
| 21:00 CEST (UTC+2) | Miličević 65' | Report | Ćuže 49', 51'; Kiš 61'; Jukić 90+2' | Stadium: Stadium Perica-Pero Pavlović; Attendance: 1,000; Referee: A. Music |

| 20 May 2024 32 | Zrinjski Mostar | 4–0 | Tuzla City | Mostar |
| 17:00 CEST (UTC+2) | Ćuže 13', 60'; Mulahusejnović 43'; Malekinušić 72' | Report | | Stadium: Stadion pod Bijelim Brijegom; Attendance: 1,500; Referee: D. Gedzic |

| 26 May 2024 33 | Igman Konjic | 1–4 | Zrinjski Mostar | Konjic |
| 16:00 CEST (UTC+2) | Ramić 17' | Report | Hrvanović 20'; Mulahusejnović 26'; Lukanić 70'; Abdurahimi 89' | Stadium: Konjic City Stadium; Attendance: 650; Referee: M. Musa |

=== Bosnia and Herzegovina Football Cup ===
| 2 November 2023 First round | Čelik Zenica | 0–6 | Zrinjski Mostar | Zenica |
| 18:00 CET (UTC+1) | | Report | Sabljić 6', 30', 35'; Maglica 10' (pen.); Malekinušić 23'; Mišić 88' | Stadium: Bilino Polje Stadium |

| 10 February 2024 Second round | Zrinjski Mostar | 3–0 | Slavija Sarajevo | Mostar |
| 13:00 CET (UTC+1) | Ćuže 3', 8'; Savić 54' | Report | | Stadium: Stadion pod Bijelim Brijegom |

| 28 February 2024 Quarter-finals First leg | Jedinstvo Bihać | 0–1 | Zrinjski Mostar | Bihać |
| 13:00 CET (UTC+1) | | Report | Hrvanović 43' | Stadium: Stadion pod Borićima; Attendance: 4,000 |

| 13 March 2024 Quarter-finals Second leg | Zrinjski Mostar | 2–0 (3–0 agg.) | Jedinstvo Bihać | Mostar |
| 15:30 CEST (UTC+2) | Mulahusejnović 4'; Lukanić 27' | Report | | Stadium: Stadion pod Bijelim Brijegom; Attendance: 800 |
Note: Zrinjski Mostar won 3–0 on aggregate.

| 4 April 2024 Semi-finals First leg | Sloga Doboj | 0–0 | Zrinjski Mostar | Doboj |
| 18:00 CEST (UTC+2) | | Report | | Stadium: Luke Stadium; Attendance: 1,500 |

| 17 April 2024 Semi-finals Second leg | Zrinjski Mostar | 3–0 (3–0 agg.) | Sloga Doboj | Mostar |
| 18:00 CEST (UTC+2) | Ilinković 40'; Ćuže 57'; Mulahusejnović 63' | Report | | Stadium: Stadion pod Bijelim Brijegom; Attendance: 1,800; Referee: A. Music |
Note: Zrinjski Mostar won 3–0 on aggregate.

| 5 May 2024 Final First leg | Zrinjski Mostar | 1–0 | Borac Banja Luka | Mostar |
| 18:00 CEST (UTC+2) | Ćuže 30'; Šunjić (yellow card) 53'; Bradarić (yellow card) 57'; Bilbija (yellow card) 70' | Report | Nišić (yellow card) 58' | Stadium: Stadion pod Bijelim Brijegom; Attendance: 6,000; Referee: S.Topalovic |

| 23 May 2024 Final Second leg | Borac Banja Luka | 0–1 (0–2 agg.) | Zrinjski Mostar | Banja Luka |
| 18:00 CEST (UTC+2) | Vuković (yellow card) 44'; Makarić (yellow card) 86'; Kvržić (yellow card) 90' | Report | Kiš (yellow card) 45'; Tičinović (yellow card) 73'; Mulahusejnović (yellow card) 78'; Malekinušić 81'; Sabljić (yellow card) 87'; Memija (yellow card) 90+2' | Stadium: Banja Luka City Stadium; Attendance: 6,000; Referee: I. Peljto |
Note: Zrinjski Mostar won 2–0 on aggregate.

=== UEFA Champions League ===
==== Qualifying ====
===== First qualifying round =====
| 11 July 2023 First leg | Urartu (Armenia) | 0–1 | (Bosnia and Herzegovina) Zrinjski Mostar | Yerevan, Armenia |
| 19:00 AMT (UTC+4) | Margaryan (yellow card) 33'; Tsymbalyuk (yellow card) 90+5' | Report | Bilbija (yellow card) 50'; Barišić (yellow card) 52'; Stanić (yellow card) 66'; Zlomislić (yellow card) 78'; Senić 89', (yellow card) 90' | Stadium: Urartu Stadium; Attendance: 3,900; Referee: Philip Farrugia (Malta); Assistant referees: Alan Camilleri (Malta), Luke Portelli (Malta); Fourth official: Alex Johnson (Malta) |

| 18 July 2023 Second leg | Zrinjski Mostar (Bosnia and Herzegovina) | 2–3 (a.e.t.) (3–3 agg.) (4–3 p) | (Armenia) Urartu | Mostar, Bosnia and Herzegovina |
| 20:00 CEST (UTC+2) | Bilbija 27'; Kiš 94' (pen.); M. Marić (yellow card) 105+1' | Report | Gunko (yellow card) 19' (not on pitch); Salou (yellow card) 55'; Margaryan (yellow card) 70'; Grigoryan 74', 90+1' (pen.); Marcos Júnior (yellow card) 90+4'; Maksimenko 105+3'; Mirzoyan (yellow card) 120' | Stadium: Stadion pod Bijelim Brijegom; Attendance: 5,000; Referee: Peter Kjaesgaard (Denmark); Assistant referees: Jesper Dahl (Denmark), Victor Skytte (Denmark); Fourth official: Jacob Karlsen (Denmark) |
| | Penalties |
| | Kiš (penalty scored); Kožulj (penalty scored); Zlomislić (penalty missed); Senić (penalty scored); Barišić (penalty scored) | | (penalty scored) Maksimenko; (penalty scored) Özbiliz; (penalty scored) Grigoryan; (penalty missed) Eduardo Teixeira; (penalty missed) Ghazaryan |
Note: 3–3 on aggregate; Zrinjski Mostar won 4–3 on penalties.

===== Second qualifying round =====
| 25 July 2023 First leg | Zrinjski Mostar (Bosnia and Herzegovina) | 0–1 | (Slovakia) Slovan Bratislava | Mostar, Bosnia and Herzegovina |
| 21:00 CEST (UTC+2) | Čanađija (yellow card) 45+1'; Jakovljević (yellow card) 52'; Kožulj (yellow card) 86' | Report | Barseghyan (yellow card) 39'; Zuberu 53'; Lovat (yellow card) 80'; Borjan (yellow card) 90+1' | Stadium: Stadion pod Bijelim Brijegom; Attendance: 4,900; Referee: Bram Van Driessche (Belgium); Assistant referees: Rien Vanyzere (Belgium), Mathias Hillaert (Belgium); Fourth official: Kevin Van Damme (Belgium) |

| 1 August 2023 Second leg | Slovan Bratislava (Slovakia) | 2–2 (3–2 agg.) | (Bosnia and Herzegovina) Zrinjski Mostar | Bratislava, Slovakia |
| 20:30 CEST (UTC+2) | Čavrić 5'; Zuberu 66'; Weiss (yellow card) 74'; Kankava (yellow card) 90+5'; Kucka (yellow card) 90+5'; Savvidis (yellow card) 90+6' | Report | Memija (yellow card) 11'; Barišić (yellow card) 54', (goal) 75'; Ćuže (yellow card) 54'; Bilbija (yellow card) 58'; Ivančić (yellow card) 71', (goal) 90+3' | Stadium: Tehelné pole Attendance: 20,498; Referee: Jérémie Pignard (France); Assistant referees: Aurélien Drouet (France), Laurent Coniglio (France); Fourth official: Bastien Dechepy (France) |
Note: Slovan Bratislava won 3–2 on aggregate.

=== UEFA Europa League ===
==== Third qualifying round ====
| 10 August 2023 First leg | Zrinjski Mostar (Bosnia and Herzegovina) | 6–2 | (Iceland) Breiðablik | Mostar, Bosnia and Herzegovina |
| 21:00 CEST (UTC+2) | Kiš 2', 30'; Malekinušić 22', 40'; Bilbija 33'; Ivančić 55'; Jakovljević (yellow card) 69'; Senić (yellow card) 87' | Report | V. Einarsson (yellow card) 25' (yellow-red card) 31'; Lúðvíksson 64'; Eyjólfsson 74' | Stadium: Stadion pod Bijelim Brijegom; Attendance: 6,200; Referee: Nick Walsh (Scotland); Assistant referees: Douglas Potter (Scotland), Calum Spence (Scotland); Fourth official: Christopher Graham (Scotland) |

| 17 August 2023 Second leg | Breiðablik (Iceland) | 1–0 (3–6 agg.) | (Bosnia and Herzegovina) Zrinjski Mostar | Kópavogur, Iceland |
| 17:30 WET (UTC) | Jakovljević 56' (o.g.); Sigurjónsson (yellow card) 73'; Árnason (yellow card) 81' (not on pitch) | Report | Barišić (yellow card) 45'; Rendulić (yellow card) 49' (not on pitch); Čanađija (yellow card) 90+1' | Stadium: Kópavogsvöllur; Attendance: 673; Referee: Anastasios Papapetrou (Greece); Assistant referees: Tryfon Petropoulos (Greece), Iordanis Aptosoglou (Greece); Fourth official: Andreas Gamaris (Greece) |
Note: Zrinjski Mostar won 6–3 on aggregate.

==== Play-off round ====
| 24 August 2023 First leg | LASK (Austria) | 2–1 | (Bosnia and Herzegovina) Zrinjski Mostar | Linz, Austria |
| 21:00 CEST (UTC+2) | Žulj 4', 12'; Horvath (yellow card) 33'; Sageder (yellow card) 61' (not on pitch); Jovičić (yellow card) 67' | Report | Bilbija 71' | Stadium: Raiffeisen Arena; Attendance: 8,300; Referee: Orel Grinfeld (Israel); Assistant referees: Roy Hassan, Idan Yarkoni; Fourth official: Gal Leibovitz (Israel) |

| 31 August 2023 Second leg | Zrinjski Mostar (Bosnia and Herzegovina) | 1–1 (2–3 agg.) | (Austria) LASK | Mostar, Bosnia and Herzegovina |
| 21:00 CEST (UTC+2) | Bilbija (yellow card) 23', (goal) 38' (pen.) | Report | Žulj (yellow card) 21'; Mustapha (yellow card) 34'; Lawal (yellow card) 37'; Jovičić 52' | Stadium: Stadion pod Bijelim Brijegom; Attendance: 6,520; Referee: Tiago Martins (Portugal); Assistant referees: Pedro Martins (Portugal), Paulo Brás (Portugal); Fourth official: Ricardo Baixinho (Portugal) |
Note: LASK won 3–2 on aggregate.

=== UEFA Europa Conference League ===
==== Group stage ====
| Pos | Team | Pld | W | D | L | GF | GA | GD | Pts | Qualification | AVL | LEG | AZ | ZRI |
|---|---|---|---|---|---|---|---|---|---|---|---|---|---|---|
| 1 | (England) Aston Villa | 6 | 4 | 1 | 1 | 12 | 7 | +5 | 13 | Advance to round of 16 | — | 2–1 | 2–1 | 1–0 |
| 2 | (Poland) Legia Warsaw | 6 | 4 | 0 | 2 | 10 | 6 | +4 | 12 | Advance to knockout round play-offs | 3–2 | — | 2–0 | 2–0 |
| 3 | (Netherlands) AZ | 6 | 2 | 0 | 4 | 7 | 12 | −5 | 6 | | 1–4 | 1–0 | — | 1–0 |
| 4 | (Bosnia and Herzegovina) Zrinjski Mostar | 6 | 1 | 1 | 4 | 6 | 10 | −4 | 4 | | 1–1 | 1–2 | 4–3 | — |

Source: UEFA
Rules for classification: Group stage tiebreakers

| 21 September 2023 1 | Zrinjski Mostar (Bosnia and Herzegovina) | 4–3 | (Netherlands) AZ | Mostar, Bosnia and Herzegovina |
| 18:45 CEST (UTC+2) | Jakovljević (yellow card) 42'; Kožulj 48', 81', (yellow card) 82'; Ćorluka 68'; Hrvanović 71', (yellow card) 72'; Rendulić (yellow card) 82' (not on pitch); Bradarić (yellow card) 90' | Report | Van Brederode 10'; Mijnans 32'; D. de Wit 44'; Clasie (yellow card) 90' | Stadium: Stadion pod Bijelim Brijegom; Attendance: 5,100; Referee: Don Robertson (Scotland); Assistant referees: David Roome (Scotland), Ross Macleod (Scotland); Fourth official: Grant Irvine (Scotland) |

| 5 October 2023 2 | Aston Villa (England) | 1–0 | (Bosnia and Herzegovina) Zrinjski Mostar | Birmingham, England |
| 20:00 BST (UTC+1) | McGinn (yellow card) 24', (goal) 90+4'; Cash (yellow card) 64'; Emery (yellow card) 90+5' (not on pitch) | Report | Hrvanović (yellow card) 22'; Bilbija (yellow card) 64' | Stadium: Villa Park; Attendance: 37,327; Referee: Urs Schnyder (Switzerland); Assistant referees: Marco Zürcher (Switzerland), Benjamin Zürcher (Switzerland); Fourth official: Sven Wolfensberger (Switzerland) |

| 26 October 2023 3 | Zrinjski Mostar (Bosnia and Herzegovina) | 1–2 | (Poland) Legia Warsaw | Mostar, Bosnia and Herzegovina |
| 21:00 CEST (UTC+2) | Bilbija 30', (yellow card) 82'; Čanađija (yellow card) 32' | Report | Jakovljević 32' (o.g.); Muçi (yellow card) 56'; Kramer 62'; Hładun (yellow card) 79'; Kun (yellow card) 90+7' | Stadium: Stadion pod Bijelim Brijegom; Attendance: 6,300; Referee: Andrei Chivulete (Romania); Assistant referees: Ferencz Tunyogi (Romania), Andrei Gabriel Constantinescu (Romania); Fourth official: Florin Andrei (Romania) |

| 9 November 2023 4 | Legia Warsaw (Poland) | 2–0 | (Bosnia and Herzegovina) Zrinjski Mostar | Warsaw, Poland |
| 18:45 CET (UTC+1) | Çelhaka (yellow card) 6'; Augustyniak 14'; Josué 30' (pen.); Elitim (yellow card) 90+2'; Wszołek (yellow card) 90+3' | Report | | Stadium: Stadion Wojska Polskiego; Attendance: 24,616; Referee: Ricardo de Burgos Bengoetxea (Spain); Assistant referees: Iker De Francisco (Spain), Jon Núñez (Spain); Fourth official: Pablo González Fuertes (Spain) |

| 30 November 2023 5 | AZ (Netherlands) | 1–0 | (Bosnia and Herzegovina) Zrinjski Mostar | Alkmaar, Netherlands |
| 18:45 CET (UTC+1) | Pavlidis 59' (pen.); Penetra (yellow card) 68' | Report | Malekinušić (yellow card) 60' | Stadium: AFAS Stadion; Attendance: 17,132; Referee: Oleksiy Derevinskyi (Ukraine); Assistant referees: Semen Shlonchak (Ukraine), Andrii Skrypka (Ukraine); Fourth official: Dmytro Panchyshyn (Ukraine) |

| 14 December 2023 6 | Zrinjski Mostar (Bosnia and Herzegovina) | 1–1 | (England) Aston Villa | Mostar, Bosnia and Herzegovina |
| 18:45 CET (UTC+1) | Čanađija (yellow card) 3'; Malekinušić 87', (yellow card) 87' | Report | Zaniolo (yellow card) 37', (goal) 61'; McGinn (yellow card) 84' | Stadium: Stadion pod Bijelim Brijegom; Attendance: 6,610; Referee: Balázs Berke (Hungary); Assistant referees: Vencel Tóth (Hungary), Balázs Szert (Hungary); Fourth official: Gergő Bogár (Hungary) |
