= 2023–24 FK Sarajevo season =

Sarajevo
2023–24 season
- Horde Zla (8 October 2023)
- Owner: Vincent Tan (49.13%); Ismir Mirvić (49.13%)
- Sporting director: Senijad Ibričić
- Manager: Mirza Varešanović (until 22 July); Simon Rožman (from 3 August)
- Stadium: Asim Ferhatović Hase Stadium
- Bosnian Premier League: 4th
- Bosnian Cup: Quarter-finals
- UEFA Europa Conference League: First qualifying round
- Top goalscorer: League: Hamza Čataković (17); All: Hamza Čataković (19)
- Highest home attendance: 21,000 vs Željezničar (8 October 2023)
- Lowest home attendance: 0 vs Igman (9 March 2024)
- Average home league attendance: 7,009
- Biggest win: Sarajevo 6–2 Tuzla City (24 November 2023)
- Biggest defeat: Sloga Doboj 3–0 Sarajevo (28 October 2023); Željezničar 3–0 Sarajevo (3 March 2024)
Home colours	Away colours	Third colours

The 2023–24 Sarajevo season was the club's 75th season in history, and their 30th consecutive season in the top flight of Bosnian football, the Bosnian Premier League. Besides competing in the Premier League, the team also competed in the National Cup. Sarajevo competed in the qualifications for the UEFA Europa Conference League as well.

== Squad information ==
=== First-team squad ===
As of 20 March 2024

Note: Flags indicate national team as defined under FIFA eligibility rules; some limited exceptions apply. Players may hold more than one non-FIFA nationality.

No.	Pos.	Nation	Player
1	GK	MKD	Dejan Iliev
3	DF	BIH	Elvir Duraković
5	MF	MNE	Marko Matanović
6	MF	BIH	Muhamed Buljubašić
7	FW	BIH	Hamza Čataković
8	MF	BIH	Eldar Mehmedović
9	FW	BRA	Renan Oliveira (3rd captain)
10	FW	VEN	Adalberto Peñaranda
11	FW	GHA	Francis Kyeremeh
14	MF	BIH	Haris Duljević
17	FW	BIH	Ajdin Hasić (on loan from Beşiktaş)

No.	Pos.	Nation	Player
18	MF	CRO	Edin Julardžija
21	MF	BIH	Anes Krdžalić
22	DF	BIH	Amar Beganović
23	DF	SRB	Slaviša Radović
24	DF	CRO	Vinko Soldo
25	DF	BIH	Tarik Kapetanović
28	DF	BIH	Marin Aničić (vice-captain)
32	MF	BIH	Nemanja Anđušić
39	GK	CRO	Lovre Rogić
44	MF	MNE	Miomir Đuričković (captain)
98	MF	BIH	Mirza Mustafić

=== Youth academy players ===
FK Sarajevo Academy players that received a first-team squad call-up.

No.	Pos.	Nation	Player
31	MF	BIH	Bakir Nurković
33	DF	BIH	Nidal Čelik
40	GK	BIH	Faris Mehić

No.	Pos.	Nation	Player
45	FW	BIH	Harun Pločo
87	DF	BIH	Sergej Popović
88	FW	BIH	Aleksa Popović

=== Coaching staff ===
Position	Name
Head coach	(Slovenia) Simon Rožman
Assistant coaches	(Slovenia) Luka Gobec
Assistant coaches	(Slovenia) Denis Mešanović
Goalkeeping coach	(Serbia) Bojan Jorgačević
Fitness coaches	(Slovenia) Anže Kunavar
Fitness coaches	(Bosnia and Herzegovina) Eldin Jelešković
Fitness coaches	(Bosnia and Herzegovina) Evelin Pipo
Sporting director	(Bosnia and Herzegovina) Senijad Ibričić
Doctor	(Bosnia and Herzegovina) Dr. Reuf Karabeg
Physiotherapists	(Bosnia and Herzegovina) Ismar Hadžibajrić
Physiotherapists	(Bosnia and Herzegovina) Mirza Marevac
Physiotherapists	(Bosnia and Herzegovina) Eldin Jarović
Technical staff manager	(Bosnia and Herzegovina) Mustafa Beridan
Equipment manager	(Bosnia and Herzegovina) Nermin Huskić
Equipment manager	(Bosnia and Herzegovina) Halil Berilo

== Transfers ==
=== In ===
Date	Pos.	Player	From	Fee	Ref.
3 June 2023	DF	(Bosnia and Herzegovina) Samir Zeljković	(Bosnia and Herzegovina) Velež Mostar	Free transfer	
3 June 2023	DF	(Bosnia and Herzegovina) Elvir Duraković	(Bosnia and Herzegovina) Igman Konjic	Free transfer	
3 June 2023	DF	(Bosnia and Herzegovina) Amar Beganović	(Slovenia) Mura	€100,000	
16 June 2023	DF	(Croatia) Vinko Soldo	(Croatia) Slaven Belupo	Free transfer	
27 June 2023	FW	(Venezuela) Adalberto Peñaranda	(Portugal) Boavista	Free transfer	
30 June 2023	FW	(Colombia) Kevin Viveros	(Venezuela) Carabobo	Undisclosed	
4 July 2023	MF	(Croatia) Ivan Jelić Balta	(Poland) Wisła Kraków	Free transfer	
4 July 2023	MF	(Bosnia and Herzegovina) Mario Vrančić	(Croatia) Rijeka	Free transfer	
5 July 2023	GK	(Croatia) Lovre Rogić	(Croatia) Šibenik	Free transfer	
7 August 2023	DF	(Bosnia and Herzegovina) Tarik Kapetanović	(Bosnia and Herzegovina) Sloboda Tuzla	€40,000	
19 August 2023	MF	(Croatia) Edin Julardžija	(Slovenia) Domžale	€130,000	
4 September 2023	MF	(Montenegro) Miomir Đuričković	(Montenegro) Budućnost Podgorica	€150,000	
11 September 2023	MF	(Bosnia and Herzegovina) Nemanja Anđušić	(Bosnia and Herzegovina) Velež Mostar	Free transfer	
12 December 2023	GK	(North Macedonia) Dejan Iliev	(Finland) HJK Helsinki	Free transfer	
26 December 2023	MF	(Bosnia and Herzegovina) Eldar Mehmedović	(Croatia) Lokomotiva Zagreb	Free transfer	
28 December 2023	MF	(Montenegro) Marko Matanović	(Montenegro) Sutjeska Nikšić	Free transfer	
8 January 2024	MF	(Bosnia and Herzegovina) Anes Krdžalić	(Croatia) Dinamo Zagreb	€125,000	
9 January 2024	GK	(Bosnia and Herzegovina) Sanin Mušija	(Bosnia and Herzegovina) Mladost Doboj Kakanj	Free transfer	
20 March 2024	MF	(Bosnia and Herzegovina) Haris Duljević	Free agent	Free transfer	
Total				€545,000	

=== Out ===
Date	Pos.	Player	To	Fee	Ref.
1 June 2023	DF	(Bosnia and Herzegovina) Avdija Vršajević	Free agent	End of contract	
1 June 2023	MF	(Croatia) Frane Čirjak	(Serbia) Novi Pazar	End of contract	
2 June 2023	MF	(Bosnia and Herzegovina) Adnan Džafić	(Bosnia and Herzegovina) Velež Mostar	End of contract	
5 June 2023	MF	(Bosnia and Herzegovina) Tarik Ramić	(Bosnia and Herzegovina) Zrinjski Mostar	End of contract	
23 June 2023	DF	(Nigeria) Musa Muhammed	(Cyprus) Doxa Katokopias	End of contract	
25 June 2023	MF	(Bosnia and Herzegovina) Irfan Ramić	(Croatia) Istra 1961	Contract termination	
1 July 2023	DF	(Bosnia and Herzegovina) Amer Dupovac	(Bosnia and Herzegovina) Igman Konjic	End of contract	
1 July 2023	MF	(Bosnia and Herzegovina) Salih Viteškić	(Bosnia and Herzegovina) Famos Hrasnica	End of contract	
4 July 2023	DF	(Montenegro) Ilija Martinović	(Israel) Bnei Sakhnin	Contract termination	
7 July 2023	GK	(Bosnia and Herzegovina) Belmin Dizdarević	(France) Montpellier	€150,000	
10 July 2023	DF	(Bosnia and Herzegovina) Hamza Bešić	(Bosnia and Herzegovina) Stupčanica Olovo	End of contract	
16 July 2023	FW	(Bosnia and Herzegovina) Kenan Dervišagić	(Bosnia and Herzegovina) Sloboda Tuzla	End of contract	
26 July 2023	DF	(Bosnia and Herzegovina) Armin Imamović	(Montenegro) Mornar	End of contract	
7 August 2023	DF	(Serbia) Nemanja Tomašević	(Serbia) Radnik Surdulica	Contract termination	
10 August 2023	MF	(Bosnia and Herzegovina) Dal Varešanović	(Turkey) Çaykur Rizespor	€1,200,000	
31 August 2023	MF	(Bosnia and Herzegovina) Đani Salčin	Free agent	Contract termination	
31 August 2023	FW	(Bosnia and Herzegovina) Nermin Bijelonja	(Slovenia) Radomlje	End of contract	
7 September 2023	FW	(Croatia) Ivan Ikić	Free agent	Contract termination	
11 December 2023	GK	(Bosnia and Herzegovina) Muhamed Šahinović	(Poland) Raków Częstochowa	€300,000	
19 December 2023	MF	(North Macedonia) Daniel Avramovski	(Turkey) Boluspor	End of contract	
5 January 2024	GK	(Bosnia and Herzegovina) Arman Šutković	(Bosnia and Herzegovina) Zrinjski Mostar	Contract termination	
23 January 2024	FW	(Bosnia and Herzegovina) Faris Đelilbašić	(Bosnia and Herzegovina) TOŠK Tešanj	Contract termination	
7 February 2024	DF	(Bosnia and Herzegovina) Mihajlo Jovašević	(Bosnia and Herzegovina) Posušje	Contract termination	
9 February 2024	FW	(Bosnia and Herzegovina) Hamza Ljukovac	(Turkey) İstanbul Başakşehir	Undisclosed	
17 February 2024	MF	(Bosnia and Herzegovina) Mario Vrančić	Free agent	Contract termination	
10 March 2024	MF	(Bosnia and Herzegovina) Almedin Ziljkić	Free agent	Contract termination	
Total				€1,650,000	

=== Loans in ===
Start date	End date	Pos.	Player	From	Ref.
19 August 2023	End of season	FW	(Bosnia and Herzegovina) Ajdin Hasić	(Turkey) Beşiktaş	

=== Loans out ===
Start date	End date	Pos.	Player	To	Ref.
5 July 2023	End of season	MF	(Bosnia and Herzegovina) Talha Tabaković	(Bosnia and Herzegovina) Čelik Zenica	
4 August 2023	End of season	FW	(Georgia (country)) Giorgi Guliashvili	(Bosnia and Herzegovina) Velež Mostar	
7 August 2023	31 December 2023	FW	(Bosnia and Herzegovina) Faris Đelilbašić	(Bosnia and Herzegovina) Famos Hrasnica	
10 August 2023	14 January 2024	DF	(Bosnia and Herzegovina) Mihajlo Jovašević	(Bosnia and Herzegovina) Igman Konjic	
30 August 2023	31 December 2023	DF	(Bosnia and Herzegovina) Tarik Kapetanović	(Bosnia and Herzegovina) Sloboda Tuzla	
8 December 2023	End of season	FW	(Colombia) Kevin Viveros	(Colombia) La Equidad	
1 January 2024	31 December 2024	MF	(Bosnia and Herzegovina) Haris Ališah	(United States) Sporting Kansas City II	
9 January 2024	End of season	GK	(Bosnia and Herzegovina) Sanin Mušija	(Bosnia and Herzegovina) Mladost Doboj Kakanj	
10 January 2024	28 June 2024	DF	(Bosnia and Herzegovina) Samir Zeljković	(Uzbekistan) Bunyodkor	
16 January 2024	End of season	DF	(Bosnia and Herzegovina) Muharem Trako	(North Macedonia) Sileks	
24 January 2024	31 December 2024	DF	(Bosnia and Herzegovina) Besim Šerbečić	(Serbia) Radnički 1923	
24 January 2024	End of season	DF	(Bosnia and Herzegovina) Enedin Mulalić	(Bosnia and Herzegovina) Zvijezda 09	
10 February 2024	End of season	MF	(Bosnia and Herzegovina) Muamer Hamzić	(Bosnia and Herzegovina) Čelik Zenica	
16 February 2024	31 December 2024	MF	(Croatia) Ivan Jelić Balta	(Croatia) Slaven Belupo	

== Kit ==
Supplier	Sponsors	
(Germany) Adidas	(Turkey) Turkish Airlines	Front
(Germany) Adidas	(Bosnia and Herzegovina) Sarajevo Canton (Bosnia and Herzegovina) BH Telecom (Bosnia and Herzegovina) MeridianBet	Back

== Pre-season and friendlies ==
Win Draw Loss Fixtures

26 June 2023 Friendly	Sarajevo (Bosnia and Herzegovina)	5–0	(Romania) Petrolul Ploiești	Slovenske Konjice, Slovenia
18:00 CEST (UTC+2)	Kyeremeh 9'; Oliveira 21', 45'; Ikić 61'; Mustafić 79'	Report		Stadium: Slovenske Konjice

30 June 2023 Friendly	Sarajevo (Bosnia and Herzegovina)	2–0	(North Macedonia) Shkëndija	Gorišnica, Slovenia
17:30 CEST (UTC+2)	Avramovski 12'; Ziljkić 42'	Report		Stadium: NK Stojnici; Attendance: 40

1 July 2023 Friendly	Nafta 1903 (Slovenia)	0–1	(Bosnia and Herzegovina) Sarajevo	Lendava, Slovenia
18:00 CEST (UTC+2)		Report	Čataković 49'	Stadium: Lendava Sports Park

6 July 2023 Friendly	Domžale (Slovenia)	1–3	(Bosnia and Herzegovina) Sarajevo	Domžale, Slovenia
17:00 CEST (UTC+2)		Report	Varešanović 17'; Čataković 71'; Radović 86'	Stadium: Domžale Stadium

5 August 2023 Friendly	Hajduk Split (Croatia)	2–2	(Bosnia and Herzegovina) Sarajevo	Split, Croatia
	Mlakar 54'; Livaja 88'	Report	Čataković 65'; Mustafić 76'	Stadium: Stadion Poljud (auxiliary field); Attendance: 0

16 August 2023 Friendly	Sarajevo (Bosnia and Herzegovina)	1–1	(Bosnia and Herzegovina) Stupčanica Olovo	Butmir
18:00 CEST (UTC+2)	Oliveira 83' (pen.)	Report	Ljuca 35'	Stadium: Butmir Training Centre; Attendance: 0

19 January 2024 Friendly	Sarajevo (Bosnia and Herzegovina)	4–0	(Bosnia and Herzegovina) Radnik Hadžići	Čitluk
13:00 CET (UTC+1)	Ziljkić 12'; Hasić 65'; Anđušić 85'; Oliveira 89'	Report		Stadium: Bare Stadium; Attendance: 0

24 January 2024 Friendly	Sarajevo (Bosnia and Herzegovina)	3–0	(Slovenia) Aluminij	Umag, Croatia
17:30 CET (UTC+1)	Hasić 38'; Anđušić 48'; Čelik 68'	Report		Stadium: Sports Camps

26 January 2024 Friendly	Sarajevo (Bosnia and Herzegovina)	2–0	(Ukraine) Rukh Lviv	Umag, Croatia
17:30 CET (UTC+1)	Oliveira 33'; Peñaranda 46'; Hasić (red card) 56'	Report		Stadium: Sports Camps
Note: The match was played in two 60-minute halves.

31 January 2024 Friendly	Sarajevo (Bosnia and Herzegovina)	3–3	(North Macedonia) Makedonija G.P.	Umag, Croatia
12:30 CET (UTC+1)	Peñaranda 28'; 46' (o.g.); Anđušić 71'	Report	Balotelli 8'; Fazli 73'; Pavišić 83'	Stadium: Sports Camps

3 February 2024 Friendly	Koper (Slovenia)	1–0	(Bosnia and Herzegovina) Sarajevo	Koper, Slovenia
13:00 CET (UTC+1)	Jurić 15'	Report	Senijad Ibričić (red card) 33'	Stadium: Bonifika Stadium

== Competitions ==
=== Overview ===
Competition	First match	Last match	Starting round	Final position	Record							
Competition	First match	Last match	Starting round	Final position	Pld	W	D	L	GF	GA	GD	Win %
Bosnian Premier League	29 July 2023	26 May 2024	Matchday 1	4th	33	16	8	9	57	38	+19	48.48
Bosnian Cup	27 September 2023	13 March 2024	First round	Quarter-finals	4	1	2	1	5	5	+0	25.00
Conference League	13 July 2023	20 July 2023	First qualifying round	First qualifying round	2	0	2	0	3	3	+0	0.00
Total					39	17	12	10	65	46	+19	43.59

Source: Competitions

=== Premier League of Bosnia and Herzegovina ===
==== League table ====
Pos	Team	Pld	W	D	L	GF	GA	GD	Pts	Qualification or relegation
2	Zrinjski Mostar	33	24	4	5	76	27	+49	76	Qualification to Conference League second qualifying round (Note: Since the winners of the 2023–24 Bosnian Cup, Zrinjski, finished in the top two of the Premier League, the Conference League first qualifying round spot was passed to the fourth-placed team.)
3	Velež Mostar	33	16	11	6	50	28	+22	59	Qualification to Conference League first qualifying round
4	Sarajevo	33	16	8	9	57	38	+19	53 (Note: Sarajevo were deducted 3 points for having its players leave the pitch in protest of multiple officiating decisions during a Bosnian Cup game against Borac.)	Qualification to Conference League first qualifying round
5	Posušje	33	13	9	11	35	29	+6	48	
6	Željezničar	33	13	4	16	35	36	−1	43	

Source: Rezultati.com
Rules for classification: 1) Points; 2) Goal difference; 3) Goals scored; 4) Head-to-head points; 5) Head-to-head goal difference; 6) Head-to-head away goals (only if two teams); 7) Head-to-head goals scored; 8) Goal difference; 9) Play-off. (Criteria 2 and 3 are not used to decide champion, UEFA competition qualification, or relegation)

==== Results summary ====
Overall								Home						Away					
Pld	W	D	L	GF	GA	GD	Pts	W	D	L	GF	GA	GD	W	D	L	GF	GA	GD
33	16	8	9	57	38	+19	53^{(Note: Sarajevo were deducted 3 points for having its players leave the pitch in protest of multiple officiating decisions during a Bosnian Cup game against Borac.)}	11	4	2	38	15	+23	5	4	7	19	23	−4

Source: Sportsport.ba

==== Results by round ====
Round	1	3	4	5	6	7	8	9	10	2^{1}	11	12	13	14	15	16	17	18	19	20	21	22	23	24	25	26	27	28	29	30	31	32	33
Ground	H	H	A	H	A	H	A	H	H	A	A	A	H	A	H	A	H	A	H	A	A	H	H	A	H	A	H	A	H	A	H	H	A
Result	L	W	W	W	D	W	L	W	W	D	W	L	D	W	W	L	W	L	L	L	L	D	W	W	W	D	D	L	W	W	W	D	D
Position	10	5	2	2	1	1	4	2	2	3	2	3	3	2	3	3	3	4	4	4	4	5	5	4	4	3	4	4	4	4	4	4	4
Points	0	3	6	9	10	13	13	16	19	20	23	23	24	27	30	30	33	33	33	33	33	34	37	40	43	44	45	42^{2}	45	48	51	52	53

Source: Competitions
A = Away; H = Home; W = Win; D = Draw; L = Loss

^{1} Matchday 2 (vs Borac) was postponed due to Borac's participation in the UEFA Europa Conference League second qualifying round.
^{2} Sarajevo were deducted 3 points for having its players leave the pitch in protest of multiple officiating decisions during a Bosnian Cup game against Borac.

==== Matches ====
30 July 2023 1	Sarajevo	1–2	Sloga Doboj	Sarajevo
20:30 CEST (UTC+2)	Oliveira 15'; Aničić (yellow card) 45+4'; Trako (yellow card) 66'; Vrančić (yellow card) 78'	Report	Karać (yellow card) 28'; Vidić 44', 70'; Popara (yellow card) 75'; Grabež (yellow card) 79'	Stadium: Asim Ferhatović Hase Stadium; Attendance: 9,500; Referee: Mateo Musa (Čitluk)
Note: Sarajevo fitness coach Almir Seferović was cautioned (yellow card) in the 67th minute.

11 August 2023 3	Sarajevo	3–0	Posušje	Sarajevo
21:00 CEST (UTC+2)	Ziljkić (yellow card) 8', (goal) 68' (pen.), 74'; Trako (yellow card) 26'; Oliveira 45+3'	Report	Boban (yellow card) 50'; Bekavac (yellow card) 66'; Krišto (yellow card) 75'; Lučić (yellow card) 81'	Stadium: Asim Ferhatović Hase Stadium; Attendance: 7,600; Referee: Mirza Kazlagić (Cazin)

21 August 2023 4	Tuzla City	1–2	Sarajevo	Tuzla
17:00 CEST (UTC+2)	Šukilović 56'	Report	Čataković 19'; Buljubašić (yellow card) 25'; Ziljkić 26'; Peñaranda (yellow card) 72'; Mustafić (yellow card) 90+5'	Stadium: Tušanj City Stadium; Attendance: 2,000; Referee: Darko Gedžić (Brčko)

28 August 2023 5	Sarajevo	1–0	Velež Mostar	Sarajevo
21:00 CEST (UTC+2)	Kyeremeh (yellow card) 42'; Oliveira 50'; Šahinović (yellow card) 86'; Beganović (yellow card) 90+3'	Report		Stadium: Asim Ferhatović Hase Stadium; Attendance: 8,450; Referee: Dragan Petrović (Banja Luka)

2 September 2023 6	GOŠK Gabela	2–2	Sarajevo	Gabela
20:45 CEST (UTC+2)	Šero 41'; Mihaljević 57'; Tabak (yellow card) 90+3'	Report	Hasić 62', 66'; Aničić (yellow card) 86'; Avramovski (yellow card) 90+2'	Stadium: Stadium Perica-Pero Pavlović; Attendance: 1,700; Referee: Frano Jelić (Široki Brijeg)

16 September 2023 7	Sarajevo	1–0	Zrinjski Mostar	Sarajevo
20:45 CEST (UTC+2)	Mustafić (yellow card) 42'; Oliveira 90' (pen.), (yellow card) 90+2'; Šahinović (yellow card) 90+2'	Report	Ivančić (yellow card) 33'; Čanađija (yellow card) 70'; Memija (yellow card) 87'; Senić (yellow card) 88'; Jakovljević (yellow card) 88'; Jukić (yellow card) 90+2'; Malekinušić (yellow card) 90+2'; Kiš (yellow card) 90+4'; Ramić (yellow card) 90+5'	Stadium: Asim Ferhatović Hase Stadium; Attendance: 8,200; Referee: Luka Bilbija (Prijedor)

22 September 2023 8	Široki Brijeg	1–0	Sarajevo	Široki Brijeg
20:00 CEST (UTC+2)	Capan (yellow card); Kuprešak (yellow card) 72'; Chinedu 73', (yellow card) 81'	Report		Stadium: Stadion Pecara; Attendance: 3,500; Referee: Miloš Gigović (Gradiška)

30 September 2023 9	Sarajevo	2–0	Zvijezda 09	Sarajevo
20:45 CEST (UTC+2)	Oliveira 24'; Radović 44'	Report	Subašić (yellow card) 45+1'; Saliman (yellow card) 48'; Karaklajić (yellow card) 66'	Stadium: Asim Ferhatović Hase Stadium; Attendance: 6,200; Referee: Ernis Džemidžić (Goražde)

8 October 2023 10	Sarajevo	3–0	Željezničar	Sarajevo
20:30 CEST (UTC+2)	Hasić 27'; Oliveira 45+3'; Čataković 90+4', (yellow card) 90+5'	Report	Mekić (yellow card) 26'; Galić (yellow card) 67'	Stadium: Asim Ferhatović Hase Stadium; Attendance: 21,000; Referee: Miloš Gigović (Gradiška)

18 October 2023 2 (Note: Match of Round 2 postponed because of Borac's participation in the UEFA Europa Conference League second qualifying round.)	Borac Banja Luka	1–1	Sarajevo	Banja Luka
19:00 CEST (UTC+2)	Terzić (yellow card) 53'; Cortés (yellow card) 81'; Jokić (yellow card) 89'; Kvržić 90+5', (yellow card) 90+7'	Report	Šahinović (yellow card) 29'; Ziljkić (yellow card) 33'; Radović (yellow card) 51'; Hasić 68'; Mustafić (yellow card) 70'; Oliveira (yellow card) 83'; Beganović (yellow card) 90+7'	Stadium: Banja Luka City Stadium; Attendance: 6,500; Referee: Mateo Musa (Čitluk)

22 October 2023 11	Igman Konjic	1–2	Sarajevo	Konjic
13:00 CEST (UTC+2)	Bešagić (yellow card) 7'; Bodul 30', (yellow card) 71'; Pirić (yellow card) 39'; Ramić (yellow card) 51'; Dupovac (yellow card) 54'; Mešić (yellow card) 68'; Đorić (yellow card) 75'	Report	Anđušić 14'; Beganović (yellow card) 45'; Buljubašić (yellow card) 77'; Radović 89'	Stadium: Konjic City Stadium; Attendance: 2,000; Referee: Mirza Kazalagić (Cazin)

28 October 2023 12	Sloga Doboj	3–0	Sarajevo	Doboj
13:30 CEST (UTC+2)	Vidić 4'; Nikolić 79'; Šipovac 90'	Report	Radović (yellow card) 39'; Buljubašić (yellow card) 78'	Stadium: Luke Stadium; Attendance: 800; Referee: Luka Bilbija (Prijedor)

5 November 2023 13	Sarajevo	1–1	Borac Banja Luka	Sarajevo
19:45 CET (UTC+1)	Aničić 90+4'	Report	Nišić 2', (yellow card) 28'; Pejović (red card) 82'; Kulašin (yellow card) 90'; Herrera (yellow card) 90'	Stadium: Asim Ferhatović Hase Stadium; Attendance: 6,500; Referee: Irfan Peljto (Sarajevo)
Note: Sarajevo sporting director Senijad Ibričić was cautioned (yellow card) in the 81st minute.

11 November 2023 14	Posušje	0–1	Sarajevo	Posušje
20:45 CET (UTC+1)	Lučić (yellow card) 83'	Report	Mustafić 30', (yellow card) 89'; Peñaranda (yellow card) 33'; Oliveira (yellow card) 44'; Kyeremeh (yellow card) 89'	Stadium: Mokri Dolac Stadium; Attendance: 2,000; Referee: Sabrija Topalović (Zenica)

24 November 2023 15	Sarajevo	6–2	Tuzla City	Sarajevo
18:00 CET (UTC+1)	Đuričković (yellow card) 11'; Čataković 19', 36'; Mustafić 23', 26'; Hasić 63'; Trako (yellow card) 77'; Anđušić 82'	Report	Pantelić 22'; Osmić (yellow card) 52'; Hadžić (yellow card) 79'; Garčević 86'	Stadium: Asim Ferhatović Hase Stadium; Attendance: 3,200; Referee: Antoni Bandić (Grude)

1 December 2023 16	Velež Mostar	1–0	Sarajevo	Mostar
18:00 CET (UTC+1)	Pršeš (yellow card) 63'; Vehabović 65'; Halilović (yellow card) 77'	Report		Stadium: Stadion Rođeni; Attendance: 4,500; Referee: Dragan Petrović (Banja Luka)

9 December 2023 17	Sarajevo	3–0	GOŠK Gabela	Sarajevo
16:00 CET (UTC+1)	Anđušić 63'; Radović (yellow card) 64'; Oliveira 78'; Čataković 84'	Report	Skorup (yellow card) 15'; Obšivač (yellow card) 16'; Šuta (yellow card) 23'; Rajović (yellow card) 38'; Radenović (yellow card) 59'; Čoko (yellow card) 74'	Stadium: Asim Ferhatović Hase Stadium; Attendance: 2,000; Referee: Mirza Kazlagić (Cazin)
Note: Sarajevo sporting director Senijad Ibričić was cautioned (yellow card) in the 74th minute.

18 December 2023 18	Zrinjski Mostar	2–0	Sarajevo	Mostar
18:00 CET (UTC+1)	Bilbija (yellow card) 27', (goal) 40'; Zlomislić 44'; Ramić (yellow card) 82'; Marić (yellow card) 86'	Report	Hasić (yellow card) 34'; Kyeremeh (yellow card) 58'; Mustafić (yellow card) 76'; Oliveira (yellow card) 90'	Stadium: Stadion pod Bijelim Brijegom; Attendance: 3,000; Referee: Irfan Peljto (Sarajevo)

18 February 2024 19	Sarajevo	1–3	Široki Brijeg	Sarajevo
13:00 CET (UTC+1)	Kapetanović (yellow card) 61'; Mustafić 86'; Hasić (yellow card) 90'	Report	Lukić 46'; Kuprešak 52'; Mišić 77'	Stadium: Asim Ferhatović Hase Stadium; Attendance: 6,500; Referee: Sabrija Topalović (Zenica)

24 February 2024 20	Zvijezda 09	1–0	Sarajevo	Ugljevik
13:00 CET (UTC+1)	Karaklajić (yellow card) 44'; Malić (yellow card) 51'; Tomanović (yellow card) 69'; Vadze 90+3', (yellow card) 90+3'	Report	Radović (yellow card) 41'; Aničić (yellow card) 90+1'	Stadium: Ugljevik City Stadium; Attendance: 550; Referee: Mirza Kazlagić (Cazin)

3 March 2024 21	Željezničar	3–0	Sarajevo	Sarajevo
18:45 CET (UTC+1)	Hiroš 12'; Selimović (yellow card) 55'; Galić 59', 70', (yellow card) 82'; Karić (yellow card) 65'; Ovčina (yellow card) 90+4'; Krpić (yellow card) 90+4'	Report	Čataković (yellow card) 90'; Soldo (yellow card) 90+4'; Iliev (red card) 90+4'	Stadium: Grbavica Stadium; Attendance: 8,500; Referee: Ermin Sivac (Zenica)

9 March 2024 22	Sarajevo	2–2	Igman Konjic	Sarajevo
18:30 CET (UTC+1)	Čataković 85'; Hasić 86'	Report	Oremuš (yellow card) 3'; Bajrić (yellow card) 43'; Ramić 72' (pen.), (yellow card) 72'; Hebibović 79'; Velić (red card) 90+1'	Stadium: Asim Ferhatović Hase Stadium; Attendance: 0 Referee: Miloš Gigović (Gradiška)
Note: Sarajevo sporting director Senijad Ibričić was cautioned (yellow card) in the 90th minute.

16 March 2024 23	Sarajevo	4–0	GOŠK Gabela	Sarajevo
20:45 CET (UTC+1)	Hasić (yellow card) 15', (goal) 35'; Čataković 43'; Beganović 74', 90+1'; Đuričković (yellow card) 78'	Report		Stadium: Asim Ferhatović Hase Stadium; Attendance: 4,300; Referee: Sabrija Topalović (Zenica)

29 March 2024 24	Tuzla City	1–5	Sarajevo	Tuzla
16:00 CET (UTC+1)	Mehanović 48', (yellow card) 85'; Fejzić (yellow card) 72'; Osmić (yellow card) 78'; Mašović (yellow card) 88'	Report	Čataković 18', 44', 59'; Čelik (yellow card) 36'; Mustafić (yellow card) 37'; Anđušić 73'; Julardžija (yellow card) 88'; Mehmedović 90'	Stadium: Tušanj City Stadium; Attendance: 700; Referee: Luka Bilbija (Prijedor)

6 April 2024 25	Sarajevo	3–2	Igman Konjic	Sarajevo
20:45 CEST (UTC+2)	Čataković 18' (pen.), 39'; Beganović 43', (yellow card) 57'; Čelik (yellow card) 60'; Đuričković (yellow card) 83'; Matanović (yellow card) 83'; Iliev (yellow card) 90+3'	Report	Hamzić (yellow card) 17'; Hebibović 30'; Denković 50'; Oremuš (yellow card) 79'; Bajrić (yellow card) 86'; Dupovac (yellow card) 89'	Stadium: Asim Ferhatović Hase Stadium; Attendance: 7,100; Referee: Dražen Marić (Bijeljina)

14 April 2024 26	Željezničar	0–0	Sarajevo	Sarajevo
20:00 CEST (UTC+2)	Hiroš (red card) 19'; Krpić (yellow card) 19'; Štilić (yellow card) 31'; Cocalić (red card) 45+2'; Ovčina (yellow card) 90'	Report	Radović (yellow card) 4' (red card) 45'; Julardžija (yellow card) 19'; Kyeremeh (yellow card) 28'; Čelik (yellow card) 41'; Mustafić (yellow card) 87'; Aničić (yellow card) 90+2'	Stadium: Grbavica Stadium; Attendance: 11,000; Referee: Ermin Sivac (Zenica)
Note: Sarajevo team manager Mustafa Beridan and assistant manager Denis Mešanović were cautioned (yellow card) in the 45th and the 90th minute, respectively.

20 April 2024 27	Sarajevo	1–1	Borac Banja Luka	Sarajevo
20:45 CEST (UTC+2)	Aničić (yellow card) 10'; Julardžija 50'; Mustafić (yellow card) 51'; Buljubašić (yellow card) 69'; Kyeremeh (yellow card) 74'; Đuričković (yellow card) 77'	Report	Herrera (yellow card) 20'; Vuković 42'; Kvržić (yellow card) 48'; Hrelja (yellow card) 76'; Lukić (yellow card) 82'	Stadium: Asim Ferhatović Hase Stadium; Attendance: 5,300; Referee: Mirza Kazlagić (Cazin)

24 April 2024 28	Zrinjski Mostar	4–3	Sarajevo	Mostar
20:30 CEST (UTC+2)	Ilinković 10', 21'; Ćuže 14', (yellow card) 30'; Bilbija 58', (yellow card) 67'; Ramić (yellow card) 60'; Marić (yellow card) 71'; Magdić (yellow card) 90+1'	Report	Čataković 45+1'; Aničić (yellow card) 51'; Oliveira 56'; Hasić (yellow card) 70'; Đuričković (yellow card) 76'; Anđušić 86'	Stadium: Stadion pod Bijelim Brijegom; Attendance: 1,500; Referee: Luka Bilbija (Prijedor)

28 April 2024 29	Sarajevo	3–0	Velež Mostar	Sarajevo
20:45 CEST (UTC+2)	Oliveira 1'; Mustafić (yellow card) 18'; Matanović (yellow card) 48'; Čataković 62'; Iliev (yellow card) 73'; Kapetanović (yellow card) 81'; Radović (yellow card) 87'; Hasić 90+3'	Report	Džafić (yellow card) 18'; Suljić (yellow card) 47'; Pršeš (yellow card) 52'; Hrkač (penalty missed) 81'; Zvonić (yellow card) 90+4'	Stadium: Asim Ferhatović Hase Stadium; Attendance: 7,100; Referee: Antoni Bandić (Grude)

4 May 2024 30	Sloga Doboj	0–1	Sarajevo	Modriča
16:00 CEST (UTC+2)	Redžić (yellow card) 49'	Report	Rogić (yellow card) 58'; Duraković (yellow card) 69'; Kyeremeh 70'	Stadium: Stadion Dr. Milan Jelić; Attendance: 400; Referee: Ernis Džemidžić (Goražde)

10 May 2024 31	Sarajevo	2–1	Zvijezda 09	Sarajevo
20:00 CEST (UTC+2)	Matanović (yellow card) 29'; Čataković 57', 63'	Report	Đuričković 15' (o.g.); Karaklajić (yellow card) 50'; Rahimić (yellow card) 51'	Stadium: Asim Ferhatović Hase Stadium; Attendance: 5,200; Referee: Haris Halkić (Sanski Most)

20 May 2024 32	Sarajevo	1–1	Posušje	Sarajevo
17:00 CEST (UTC+2)	Julardžija (yellow card) 72'; Oliveira 76'	Report	Begić (yellow card) 47'; Pavković (yellow card) 67', (goal) 90+2'; Marić (yellow card) 69'	Stadium: Asim Ferhatović Hase Stadium; Attendance: 4,000; Referee: Josip Martinović (Čapljina)

26 May 2024 33	Široki Brijeg	2–2	Sarajevo	Čitluk
17:00 CEST (UTC+2)	F. Matić 19'; Mamić 29'; M. Matić (yellow card) 70'; Mašić (yellow card) 87'; Kuprešak (yellow card) 90'	Report	Čataković 4'; Matanović (yellow card) 56'; Anđušić 90+3'	Stadium: Bare Stadium; Attendance: 100; Referee: Luka Bilbija (Prijedor)

=== Cup of Bosnia and Herzegovina ===
==== Round of 32 ====
27 September 2023	Sloga Gornji Vakuf-Uskoplje	1–4	Sarajevo	Gornji Vakuf-Uskoplje
15:30 CEST (UTC+2)	Grubeša 19' (pen.); Sadiković (yellow card) 67'	Report	Anđušić 11'; Trako (yellow card) 18'; Čataković 32'; Kyeremeh 44'; Peñaranda 60' (pen.)	Stadium: Košute Stadium; Attendance: 1,000; Referee: Ermin Sivac (Zenica)

==== Round of 16 ====
11 February 2024	Sloboda Tuzla	1–1 (2–4 p)	Sarajevo	Tuzla
13:00 CET (UTC+1)	Delić 51', (yellow card) 90+6'; Hadžanović (yellow card) 62'; Hasanbegović (yellow card) 68'; Hasanović (yellow card) 84'	Report	Hasić 32'; Mustafić (yellow card) 40'; Matanović (yellow card) 56'; Čataković (yellow card) 82'; Aničić (yellow card) 90'; Anđušić (yellow card) 90+1'	Stadium: Tušanj City Stadium; Attendance: 4,500; Referee: Luka Bilbija (Prijedor)
	Penalties
	Hadžanović (penalty missed); Kalesić (penalty scored); Merdović (penalty missed); Delić (penalty scored)		(penalty scored) Ziljkić; (penalty scored) Čataković; (penalty missed) Peñaranda; (penalty scored) Julardžija; (penalty scored) Aničić

==== Quarter-finals ====
28 February 2024 First leg	Borac Banja Luka	0–0	Sarajevo	Banja Luka
18:30 CET (UTC+1)	Kvržić (yellow card) 81'; Lukić (yellow card) 81'; Herrera (yellow card) 81'	Report	Kyeremeh (yellow card) 63'; Đuričković (yellow card) 81'; Hasić (yellow card) 81'; Oliveira (yellow card) 81'	Stadium: Banja Luka City Stadium; Attendance: 5,500; Referee: Irfan Peljto (Sarajevo)

13 March 2024 Second leg	Sarajevo	0–3 (awd.) (0–3 agg.)	Borac Banja Luka	Sarajevo
17:30 CET (UTC+1)	Kyeremeh (yellow card) 37'; Duraković (yellow card) 49'; Čataković 55' (pen.); Kapetanović (yellow card) 58'; Oliveira (red card) 63'; Peñaranda (yellow card) 80'; Anđušić (yellow card) 80'; Soldo (yellow card) 89'; Đuričković (yellow card) 89'	Report	Marčetić 23', 60'; Terzić (yellow card) 32'; Pejović (yellow card) 89'	Stadium: Asim Ferhatović Hase Stadium; Attendance: 3,500; Referee: Mateo Musa (Čitluk)
Note: Borac were awarded a 3–0 win against Sarajevo after the latter's coaching staff ordered its players to leave the pitch in the 93rd minute in protest of multiple officiating decisions during the game. During the match Sarajevo sporting director Senijad Ibričić, team manager Mustafa Beridan and the manager Simon Rožman were cautioned (yellow card) in the 15th, 49th and the 56th minute, respectively. Sarajevo assistant manager Luka Gobec was sent off (red card) in the 65th minute.

=== UEFA Europa Conference League ===
Sarajevo entered the UEFA Europa Conference League at the first qualifying round.

==== First qualifying round ====
13 July 2023 First Leg	Torpedo Kutaisi (Georgia (country))	2–2	(Bosnia and Herzegovina) Sarajevo	Kutaisi, Georgia
21:00 GET (UTC+4)	Sandokhadze 44'; Bugridze 48'	Report	Oliveira 47'; Varešanović 52'; Trako (yellow card) 65'; Beganović (yellow card) 73'; Mustafić (yellow card) 86'	Stadium: Ramaz Shengelia Stadium; Attendance: 7,900; Referee: Snir Levy (Israel)

20 July 2023 Second Leg	Sarajevo (Bosnia and Herzegovina)	1–1 (a.e.t.) (3–3 agg.) (2–4 p)	(Georgia (country)) Torpedo Kutaisi	Sarajevo, Bosnia and Herzegovina
21:00 CEST (UTC+2)	Ziljkić 12', (yellow card) 40'; Beganović (yellow card) 90'; Šerbečić (yellow card) 103'; Mustafić (yellow card) 112'	Report	Pantsulaia (yellow card) 40'; Bugridze (yellow card) 42'; Gigauri (yellow card) 44', (goal) 90+1'; Mandzhgaladze (yellow card) 82'; Caballero (yellow card) 91'; Goshadze (yellow card) 104'	Stadium: Asim Ferhatović Hase Stadium; Attendance: 19,774; Referee: Ion Orlic (Moldova)
	Penalties
	Ikić (penalty missed); Čataković (penalty scored); Avramovski (penalty scored); Beganović (penalty missed)		(penalty scored) Shergelashvili; (penalty scored) Mandzhgaladze; (penalty scored) Kobuladze; (penalty scored) Caballero

== Statistics ==
=== Appearances and goals ===
No.	Pos	Nat	Player	Total		Bosnian Premier League		Bosnian Cup		Conference League	
No.	Pos	Nat	Player	Apps	Goals	Apps	Goals	Apps	Goals	Apps	Goals
Goalkeepers
1	GK	(North Macedonia) MKD	Dejan Iliev	14	0	12	0	2	0	0	0
39	GK	(Croatia) CRO	Lovre Rogić	10	0	7	0	2	0	1	0
40	GK	(Bosnia and Herzegovina) BIH	Faris Mehić	0	0	0	0	0	0	0	0
Defenders
3	DF	(Bosnia and Herzegovina) BIH	Elvir Duraković	21	0	10+7	0	1+1	0	2	0
22	DF	(Bosnia and Herzegovina) BIH	Amar Beganović	34	3	29+2	3	1	0	2	0
23	DF	(Serbia) SRB	Slaviša Radović	27	2	18+5	2	2+1	0	0+1	0
24	DF	(Croatia) CRO	Vinko Soldo	25	0	19+2	0	3	0	1	0
25	DF	(Bosnia and Herzegovina) BIH	Tarik Kapetanović	9	0	5+2	0	1+1	0	0	0
28	DF	(Bosnia and Herzegovina) BIH	Marin Aničić	24	1	20+1	1	1+1	0	1	0
33	DF	(Bosnia and Herzegovina) BIH	Nidal Čelik	11	0	8+2	0	0+1	0	0	0
87	DF	(Bosnia and Herzegovina) BIH	Sergej Popović	0	0	0	0	0	0	0	0
Midfielders
5	MF	(Montenegro) MNE	Marko Matanović	14	0	6+5	0	2+1	0	0	0
6/50 (Note: In 2023 Buljubašić wore the number 50, and from the beginning of the summer part of the season in 2024 he changed the number to 6.)	MF	(Bosnia and Herzegovina) BIH	Muhamed Buljubašić	31	0	23+4	0	2+1	0	0+1	0
8	MF	(Bosnia and Herzegovina) BIH	Eldar Mehmedović	14	1	1+12	1	1	0	0	0
14	MF	(Bosnia and Herzegovina) BIH	Haris Duljević	3	0	0+3	0	0	0	0	0
18	MF	(Croatia) CRO	Edin Julardžija	30	1	25+2	1	3	0	0	0
21	MF	(Bosnia and Herzegovina) BIH	Anes Krdžalić	1	0	0	0	0+1	0	0	0
31	MF	(Bosnia and Herzegovina) BIH	Bakir Nurković	1	0	0	0	0+1	0	0	0
32	MF	(Bosnia and Herzegovina) BIH	Nemanja Anđušić	26	7	8+14	6	2+2	1	0	0
44	MF	(Montenegro) MNE	Miomir Đuričković	30	0	27	0	3	0	0	0
98	MF	(Bosnia and Herzegovina) BIH	Mirza Mustafić	32	4	23+5	4	2	0	0+2	0
Forwards
7	FW	(Bosnia and Herzegovina) BIH	Hamza Čataković	38	19	16+17	17	2+2	2	0+1	0
9	FW	(Brazil) BRA	Renan Oliveira	32	11	21+5	10	2+2	0	2	1
10	FW	(Venezuela) VEN	Adalberto Peñaranda	20	1	7+9	0	3+1	1	0	0
11	FW	(Ghana) GHA	Francis Kyeremeh	33	2	11+16	1	4	1	2	0
17	FW	(Bosnia and Herzegovina) BIH	Ajdin Hasić	33	9	21+8	8	2+2	1	0	0
45	FW	(Bosnia and Herzegovina) BIH	Harun Pločo	2	0	0+2	0	0	0	0	0
88	FW	(Bosnia and Herzegovina) BIH	Aleksa Popović	0	0	0	0	0	0	0	0
Players transferred out during the season
1	GK	(Bosnia and Herzegovina) BIH	Muhamed Šahinović	15	0	14	0	0	0	1	0
4	DF	(Bosnia and Herzegovina) BIH	Muharem Trako	5	0	2+1	0	1	0	1	0
5	MF	(Croatia) CRO	Ivan Jelić Balta	3	0	1	0	0	0	1+1	0
6	DF	(Bosnia and Herzegovina) BIH	Samir Zeljković	6	0	1+2	0	1	0	2	0
8	MF	(Bosnia and Herzegovina) BIH	Mario Vrančić	10	0	3+5	0	0	0	2	0
10	MF	(Bosnia and Herzegovina) BIH	Dal Varešanović	3	1	1	0	0	0	2	1
13	GK	(Bosnia and Herzegovina) BIH	Arman Šutković	0	0	0	0	0	0	0	0
15	MF	(Bosnia and Herzegovina) BIH	Haris Ališah	1	0	0+1	0	0	0	0	0
16	MF	(Bosnia and Herzegovina) BIH	Hamza Ljukovac	2	0	0+1	0	0+1	0	0	0
18	FW	(Georgia (country)) GEO	Giorgi Guliashvili	2	0	0+1	0	0	0	0+1	0
19	FW	(Colombia) COL	Kevin Viveros	1	0	0	0	0	0	0+1	0
21	DF	(Bosnia and Herzegovina) BIH	Besim Šerbečić	3	0	1+1	0	0	0	0+1	0
27	MF	(North Macedonia) MKD	Daniel Avramovski	17	0	11+4	0	1	0	0+1	0
29	FW	(Croatia) CRO	Ivan Ikić	3	0	0+2	0	0	0	0+1	0
30	DF	(Bosnia and Herzegovina) BIH	Enedin Mulalić	2	0	1+1	0	0	0	0	0
77	MF	(Bosnia and Herzegovina) BIH	Almedin Ziljkić	16	4	11+2	3	0+1	0	2	1

Number after the "+" sign represents the number of games player started the game on the bench and was substituted on.

=== Goalscorers ===
Rank	No.	Pos.	Nat.	Player	Bosnian Premier League	Bosnian Cup	Conference League	Total
1	7	FW	(Bosnia and Herzegovina)	Hamza Čataković	17	2	0	19
2	9	FW	(Brazil)	Renan Oliveira	10	0	1	11
3	17	FW	(Bosnia and Herzegovina)	Ajdin Hasić	8	1	0	9
4	32	MF	(Bosnia and Herzegovina)	Nemanja Anđušić	6	1	0	7
5	77	MF	(Bosnia and Herzegovina)	Almedin Ziljkić	3	0	1	4
5	98	MF	(Bosnia and Herzegovina)	Mirza Mustafić	4	0	0	4
7	22	DF	(Bosnia and Herzegovina)	Amar Beganović	3	0	0	3
8	11	FW	(Ghana)	Francis Kyeremeh	1	1	0	2
8	23	DF	(Serbia)	Slaviša Radović	2	0	0	2
10	8	MF	(Bosnia and Herzegovina)	Eldar Mehmedović	1	0	0	1
10	10	FW	(Venezuela)	Adalberto Peñaranda	0	1	0	1
10	10	MF	(Bosnia and Herzegovina)	Dal Varešanović	0	0	1	1
10	18	MF	(Croatia)	Edin Julardžija	1	0	0	1
10	28	DF	(Bosnia and Herzegovina)	Marin Aničić	1	0	0	1
Total					57	6	3	66

=== Hat-tricks ===
Player	Against	Result	Date	Competition	Ref
(Bosnia and Herzegovina) Hamza Čataković	(Bosnia and Herzegovina) Tuzla City	1–5 (A)	29 March 2024	Bosnian Premier League	

(H) – Home; (A) – Away

=== Assists ===
Rank	No.	Pos.	Nat.	Player	Bosnian Premier League	Bosnian Cup	Conference League	Total
1	11	FW	(Ghana)	Francis Kyeremeh	6	2	1	9
2	22	DF	(Bosnia and Herzegovina)	Amar Beganović	7	0	0	7
3	17	FW	(Bosnia and Herzegovina)	Ajdin Hasić	4	0	0	4
4	9	FW	(Brazil)	Renan Oliveira	3	0	0	3
4	18	MF	(Croatia)	Edin Julardžija	3	0	0	3
4	27	MF	(North Macedonia)	Daniel Avramovski	3	0	0	3
4	32	MF	(Bosnia and Herzegovina)	Nemanja Anđušić	2	1	0	3
8	6/50	MF	(Bosnia and Herzegovina)	Muhamed Buljubašić	2	0	0	2
8	23	DF	(Serbia)	Slaviša Radović	2	0	0	2
8	77	MF	(Bosnia and Herzegovina)	Almedin Ziljkić	1	0	1	2
11	3	DF	(Bosnia and Herzegovina)	Elvir Duraković	1	0	0	1
11	5	MF	(Montenegro)	Marko Matanović	1	0	0	1
11	6	DF	(Bosnia and Herzegovina)	Samir Zeljković	0	0	1	1
11	7	FW	(Bosnia and Herzegovina)	Hamza Čataković	1	0	0	1
11	10	FW	(Venezuela)	Adalberto Peñaranda	1	0	0	1
11	14	MF	(Bosnia and Herzegovina)	Haris Duljević	1	0	0	1
11	24	DF	(Croatia)	Vinko Soldo	1	0	0	1
11	28	DF	(Bosnia and Herzegovina)	Marin Aničić	1	0	0	1
11	30	DF	(Bosnia and Herzegovina)	Enedin Mulalić	1	0	0	1
11	98	MF	(Bosnia and Herzegovina)	Mirza Mustafić	1	0	0	1
Total					42	3	3	48

=== Clean sheets ===
Rank	No.	Nat.	Player	Bosnian Premier League	Bosnian Cup	Conference League	Total
1	1	(Bosnia and Herzegovina)	Muhamed Šahinović	5	0	0	5
2	1	(North Macedonia)	Dejan Iliev	3	1	0	4
3	39	(Croatia)	Lovre Rogić	3	0	0	3
Total				11	1	0	12

=== Disciplinary record ===
N	P	Nat.	Name	Bosnian Premier League			Bosnian Cup			Conference League			Total			Notes
N	P	Nat.	Name	Yellow card	Second yellow card	Red card	Yellow card	Second yellow card	Red card	Yellow card	Second yellow card	Red card	Yellow card	Second yellow card	Red card	Notes
1	GK	(North Macedonia)	Dejan Iliev	2		1							2		1	
1	GK	(Bosnia and Herzegovina)	Muhamed Šahinović	3									3			
3	DF	(Bosnia and Herzegovina)	Elvir Duraković	1			1						2			
4	DF	(Bosnia and Herzegovina)	Muharem Trako	3			1			1			5			
5	MF	(Montenegro)	Marko Matanović	4			1						5			
6/50	MF	(Bosnia and Herzegovina)	Muhamed Buljubašić	4									4			
7	FW	(Bosnia and Herzegovina)	Hamza Čataković	2			1						3			
8	MF	(Bosnia and Herzegovina)	Mario Vrančić	1									1			
9	FW	(Brazil)	Renan Oliveira	4			1		1				5		1	
10	FW	(Venezuela)	Adalberto Peñaranda	2			1						3			
11	FW	(Ghana)	Francis Kyeremeh	5			2						7			
17	FW	(Bosnia and Herzegovina)	Ajdin Hasić	4			1						5			
18	MF	(Croatia)	Edin Julardžija	3			1						4			
21	DF	(Bosnia and Herzegovina)	Besim Šerbečić							1			1			
22	DF	(Bosnia and Herzegovina)	Amar Beganović	4						2			6			
23	DF	(Serbia)	Slaviša Radović	6		1							6		1	
24	DF	(Croatia)	Vinko Soldo	1			1						2			
25	DF	(Bosnia and Herzegovina)	Tarik Kapetanović	2			1						3			
27	MF	(North Macedonia)	Daniel Avramovski	1									1			
28	DF	(Bosnia and Herzegovina)	Marin Aničić	6			1						7			
32	MF	(Bosnia and Herzegovina)	Nemanja Anđušić				2						2			
33	DF	(Bosnia and Herzegovina)	Nidal Čelik	3			1						4			
39	GK	(Croatia)	Lovre Rogić	1									1			
44	MF	(Montenegro)	Miomir Đuričković	5			2						7			
77	MF	(Bosnia and Herzegovina)	Almedin Ziljkić	2						1			3			
98	MF	(Bosnia and Herzegovina)	Mirza Mustafić	9			1			2			12			
		(Slovenia)	Simon Rožman				1						1			Manager
		(Slovenia)	Luka Gobec						1						1	Assistant manager
		(Slovenia)	Denis Mešanović	1									1			Assistant manager
		(Bosnia and Herzegovina)	Senijad Ibričić	3			1						4			Sporting director
		(Bosnia and Herzegovina)	Almir Seferović	1									1			Fitness coach
		(Bosnia and Herzegovina)	Mustafa Beridan	1			1						2			Team manager

Source: Competitive matches
Only competitive matches
(yellow card) = Number of bookings; (second yellow card) = Number of sending offs after a second yellow card; (red card) = Number of sending offs by a direct red card.

=== Games as captain ===
Rank	No.	Pos.	Nat.	Player	Bosnian Premier League	Bosnian Cup	Conference League	Total
1	28	DF	(Bosnia and Herzegovina)	Marin Aničić	12	1	0	13
1	77	MF	(Bosnia and Herzegovina)	Almedin Ziljkić	11	0	2	13
3	44	MF	(Montenegro)	Miomir Đuričković	7	1	0	8
4	9	FW	(Brazil)	Renan Oliveira	1	1	0	2
4	27	MF	(North Macedonia)	Daniel Avramovski	1	1	0	2
6	10	MF	(Bosnia and Herzegovina)	Dal Varešanović	1	0	0	1
Total					33	4	2	39
