= Hrvoje Barišić =

Footballer (born 1991)

Personal information
- Date of birth: 3 February 1991 (age 35)
- Place of birth: Split, SR Croatia, Yugoslavia
- Height: 1.93 m (6 ft 4 in)
- Position: Centre-back

Team information
- Current team: Zrinjski Mostar
- Number: 4

Youth career
- 2004–2008: Mosor

Senior career*
Years	Team	Apps	(Gls)
2008–2010	Mosor	32	(2)
2010–2011	Dugopolje	27	(3)
2011	Split	0	(0)
2011–2012	Dugopolje	33	(3)
2013–2014	Zrinjski Mostar	28	(3)
2014–2015	Slaven Belupo	7	(0)
2014	Slaven Belupo B	2	(0)
2015	→ Vitez (loan)	12	(0)
2015–2017	Vitez	49	(2)
2017–2019	Zrinjski Mostar	59	(4)
2019–2020	Sepsi OSK	15	(0)
2020–2021	Tuzla City	26	(1)
2021–	Zrinjski Mostar	124	(6)

International career
2011	Croatia U21	1	(0)
2021	Bosnia and Herzegovina	1	(0)
- * Club domestic league appearances and goals as of 19 September 2026

Hrvoje Barišić (born 3 February 1991) is a professional footballer who plays as a centre-back for Bosnian Premier League club Zrinjski Mostar. Born in Croatia, he plays for the Bosnia and Herzegovina national team.

== Club career ==
Born in Split, Barišić graduated from the academy of Mosor. In 2011, he was invited by Dugopolje to feature in for friendlies for the club.

He made his international debut by playing the last 2 minutes of an UEFA Europa League encounter for Split against Domžale.

Barišić won the 2013–14 Bosnian Premier League with Zrinjski Mostar. In 2014, he returned to Croatia and penned a two-year deal with Slaven Belupo. He made his debut for the club in a 4–0 defeat against Dinamo Zagreb.

In January 2015, Barišić returned to Bosnia and Herzegovina, this time through a six-month loan deal with Vitez.

At the end of the season, he terminated his contract with Slaven Belupo after he felt that he was surplus to the club. He subsequently signed permanently with Vitez, penning a one-year deal. In the two seasons he played for the club, he made 49 league appearances, scoring 2 goals.

While playing for Vitez, Barišić won the attraction of Bosnian club Sarajevo as well as clubs from Poland. In May 2017, he left Vitez by mutual consent.

In July 2017, he returned to Zrinjski Mostar on a two-year contract. In May 2018, Barišić once again won the Bosnian Premier League title with Zrinjski. He left Zrinjski in June 2019 after his contract with the club expired.

On 13 June 2019, he signed a contract with Liga I club Sepsi OSK. He left Sepsi in July 2020 after his contract expired.

On 30 July 2020, Barišić again came back to Bosnia and Herzegovina after joining Tuzla City. He made his official debut for Tuzla City on 8 August 2020 in a league match against Krupa. Barišić scored his first goal for Tuzla City in a league game against Olimpik on 23 August 2020. He left Tuzla City in June 2021.

On 25 June 2021, Barišić again returned to Zrinjski Mostar, signing a two-year contract.

== International career ==
Barišić played for the Croatia U21 national team in 2011, making one appearance.

He made his senior debut however for Bosnia and Herzegovina, in a December 2021 friendly game away against the United States.

== Career statistics ==
=== Club ===
As of match played 19 September 2026

Appearances and goals by club, season and competition
Club	Season	League			National cup (Note: Includes Croatian Cup, Bosnian Cup, Romanian Cup)		Continental		Other		Total	
Club	Season	Division	Apps	Goals	Apps	Goals	Apps	Goals	Apps	Goals	Apps	Goals
Mosor	2008–09	Croatian Second League	8	1	—		—		—		8	1
Mosor	2009–10	Croatian Second League	24	1	—		—		—		24	1
Mosor	Total		32	2	—		—		—		32	2
Dugopolje	2010–11	Croatian Second League	27	3	—		—		—		27	3
Split	2011–12	Croatian First League	0	0	—		1 (Note: Appearance in UEFA Europa League)	0	—		1	0
Dugopolje	2011–12	Croatian Second League	19	1	—		—		—		19	1
Dugopolje	2012–13	Croatian Second League	14	2	—		—		—		14	2
Dugopolje	Total		33	3	—		—		—		33	3
Zrinjski Mostar	2012–13	Bosnian Premier League	4	0	—		—		—		4	0
Zrinjski Mostar	2013–14	Bosnian Premier League	24	3	5	1	1	0	—		30	4
Zrinjski Mostar	Total		28	3	5	1	1	0	—		34	4
Slaven Belupo	2014–15	Croatian First League	7	0	2	1	—		—		9	1
Slaven Belupo B	2014–15	Croatian Third League	2	0	—		—		—		2	0
Vitez (loan)	2014–15	Bosnian Premier League	12	0	—		—		—		12	0
Vitez	2015–16	Bosnian Premier League	24	0	1	0	—		—		25	0
Vitez	2016–17	Bosnian Premier League	25	2	1	0	—		—		26	2
Vitez	Total		49	2	2	0	—		—		51	2
Zrinjski Mostar	2017–18	Bosnian Premier League	31	3	1	0	—		—		32	3
Zrinjski Mostar	2018–19	Bosnian Premier League	28	1	2	0	5 (Note: Two appearances in UEFA Champions League, three appearances in UEFA Europa League)	1	—		35	2
Zrinjski Mostar	Total		59	4	3	0	5	1	—		67	5
Sepsi OSK	2019–20	Liga I	15	0	1	0	—		—		16	0
Tuzla City	2020–21	Bosnian Premier League	26	1	5	0	—		—		31	1
Zrinjski Mostar	2021–22	Bosnian Premier League	29	1	1	0	—		—		30	1
Zrinjski Mostar	2022–23	Bosnian Premier League	30	2	5	1	8 (Note: Two appearances in UEFA Champions League, six appearances in UEFA Europa Conference League)	0	—		43	3
Zrinjski Mostar	2023–24	Bosnian Premier League	17	1	5	0	7 (Note: Four appearances and one goal in UEFA Champions League, three appearances in UEFA Europa League)	1	—		29	2
Zrinjski Mostar	2024–25	Bosnian Premier League	21	2	1	0	6 (Note: Appearances in UEFA Conference League)	0	1 (Note: Appearance in the Bosnian Supercup)	0	29	2
Zrinjski Mostar	2025–26	Bosnian Premier League	19	0	2	0	6 (Note: Two appearances in UEFA Champions League, one appearance in UEFA Europa League, three appearances in UEFA Conference League)	0	—		27	0
Zrinjski Mostar	2026–27	Bosnian Premier League	8	0	0	0	2	0	—		10	0
Zrinjski Mostar	Total		124	6	14	1	29	1	1	0	168	8
Career total			414	24	32	3	36	2	1	0	483	29

=== International ===
Appearances and goals by national team and year
National team	Year	Apps	Goals
Bosnia and Herzegovina
Bosnia and Herzegovina	2021	1	0
Total		1	0

== Honours ==
Dugopolje

- Croatian Second League: 2011–12

Zrinjski Mostar

- Bosnian Premier League: 2013–14, 2017–18, 2021–22, 2022–23, 2024–25
- Bosnian Cup: 2022–23, 2023–24
- Bosnian Supercup: 2024
