= Mihajlo Jovašević =

Bosnian footballer (born 2003)

Personal information
- Date of birth: 12 October 2003 (age 23)
- Place of birth: Banja Luka, Bosnia and Herzegovina
- Height: 1.80 m (5 ft 11 in)
- Position: Left-back

Youth career
- –2022: Sarajevo

Senior career*
Years	Team	Apps	(Gls)
2022–2023	Sarajevo	0	(0)
2022–2023	→ Mladost Doboj Kakanj (loan)	29	(2)
2023	→ Igman Konjic (loan)	4	(0)
2024	Posušje	3	(0)
2024–2025	Sloboda Tuzla	19	(0)

International career^{‡}
2017	Bosnia and Herzegovina U15	4	(0)
2019	Bosnia and Herzegovina U17	3	(0)
2021	Bosnia and Herzegovina U19	3	(0)
- * Club domestic league appearances and goals as of 30 June 2025 ‡ National team caps and goals as of 24 September 2022

Mihajlo Jovašević (Serbian Cyrillic: Михајло Јовашевић; born 12 October 2003) is a Bosnian professional footballer who plays as a left-back for Bosnian Premier League club Sloboda Tuzla.

== Career statistics ==
=== Club ===
As of match played 11 April 2025

Appearances and goals by club, season and competition
Club	Season	League			National cup (Note: Includes Bosnia and Herzegovina Cup)		Continental		Total	
Club	Season	Division	Apps	Goals	Apps	Goals	Apps	Goals	Apps	Goals
Sarajevo	2022–23	Bosnian Premier League	0	0	0	0	—		0	0
Sarajevo	2023–24	Bosnian Premier League	0	0	0	0	0	0	0	0
Sarajevo	Total		0	0	0	0	0	0	0	0
Mladost Doboj Kakanj (loan)	2022–23	First League of FBiH	29	2	0	0	—		29	2
Igman Konjic (loan)	2023–24	Bosnian Premier League	4	0	0	0	—		4	0
Posušje	2023–24	Bosnian Premier League	3	0	0	0	—		3	0
Sloboda Tuzla	2024–25	Bosnian Premier League	13	0	0	0	—		13	0
Career total			49	2	0	0	0	0	49	2
