= Kerim Memija =

Bosnian footballer (born 1996)

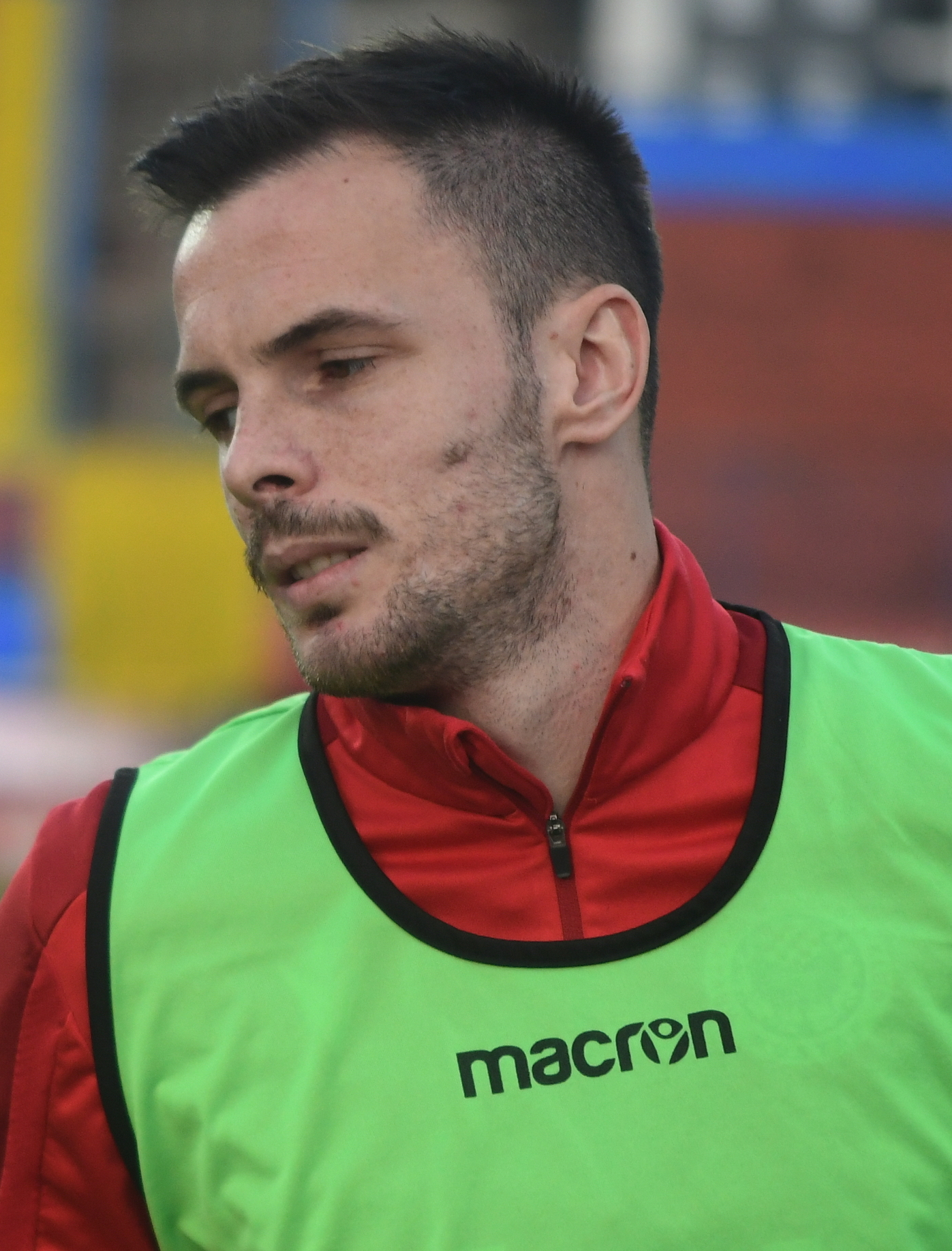
- Memija warming-up with Zrinjski Mostar in 2024

Personal information
- Date of birth: 6 January 1996 (age 30)
- Place of birth: Sarajevo, Bosnia and Herzegovina
- Height: 1.79 m (5 ft 10 in)
- Position: Right back

Team information
- Current team: Persija Jakarta
- Number: 50

Youth career
- Željezničar

Senior career*
Years	Team	Apps	(Gls)
2014–2017	Željezničar	61	(3)
2017–2020	Vejle	63	(0)
2019–2020	→ Hobro IK (loan)	2	(0)
2020–2021	NK Varaždin	24	(0)
2021–2026	Zrinjski Mostar	116	(2)
2026–	Persija Jakarta	9	(0)

International career
2012	Bosnia and Herzegovina U17	3	(0)
2014–2015	Bosnia and Herzegovina U19	13	(1)
2015–2018	Bosnia and Herzegovina U21	20	(1)
- * Club domestic league appearances and goals as of 1 November 2026

Kerim Memija (Bosnian pronunciation: [kěrim měmija]; born 6 January 1996) is a Bosnian professional footballer who plays as a right back for Super League club Persija Jakarta.

Memija started his professional career at Željezničar, before joining Vejle in 2017. In 2019, he was loaned to Hobro IK.

== Club career ==
=== Željezničar ===
Born in Sarajevo, Memija came through the youth academy of his hometown club Željezničar. He signed his first professional contract in January 2014. He made his professional debut against Slavija on 16 March 2014 at the age of 18. On 17 August 2014, he scored his first professional goal against the same opponent.

=== Vejle ===
In January 2017, Memija was transferred to Danish side Vejle for an undisclosed fee. He made his competitive debut for the club in a loss to Skive on 5 March.

Memija was an important piece in Vejle's conquest of Danish 1st Division title, his first trophy with the club, which was sealed on 21 May 2018 and earned them promotion to Danish Superliga.

In September 2019, Memija was sent on a season-long loan to Hobro IK.

=== Persija Jakarta ===
On 9 July 2026, Persija jakarta announced the signing of Memija for two seasons.

== International career ==
Memija represented Bosnia and Herzegovina on all youth levels. He also served as captain of the under-21 team under coach Vinko Marinović.

== Career statistics ==
=== Club ===
As of match played 24 November 2019

Club	Season	League			Cup		Continental		Other		Total	
Club	Season	Division	Apps	Goals	Apps	Goals	Apps	Goals	Apps	Goals	Apps	Goals
Željezničar	2013–14	Bosnian Premier League	1	0	0	0	–		–		1	0
Željezničar	2014–15	Bosnian Premier League	25	3	2	1	1	0	–		28	4
Željezničar	2015–16	Bosnian Premier League	23	0	5	0	5	0	–		33	0
Željezničar	2016–17	Bosnian Premier League	12	0	1	0	–		–		13	0
Željezničar	Total		61	3	8	1	6	0	–		75	4
Vejle	2016–17	1. Division	12	0	–		–		–		12	0
Vejle	2017–18	1. Division	29	0	1	0	–		–		30	0
Vejle	2018–19	Danish Superliga	19	0	1	0	–		2 (Note: Appearances in Danish Superliga relegation play-offs)	0	22	0
Vejle	2019–20	1. Division	3	0	1	0	–		–		4	0
Vejle	Total		63	0	3	0	–		2	0	68	0
Hobro (loan)	2019–20	Danish Superliga	2	0	1	0	–		–		3	0
Career total			126	3	12	1	6	0	2	0	146	4

== Honours ==
Vejle

- 1. Division: 2017–18, 2019–20

Zrinjski Mostar

- Bosnian Premier League: 2021–22, 2022–23, 2024–25
- Bosnian Cup: 2022–23, 2023–24
- Bosnian Supercup: 2024
