= Slobodan Jakovljević =

Serbian footballer (born 1989)

Personal information
- Date of birth: 26 May 1989 (age 37)
- Place of birth: Pristina, Republika e Kosoves
- Height: 1.86 m (6 ft 1 in)
- Position: Centre-back

Team information
- Current team: Zrinjski Mostar
- Number: 27

Youth career
- 2007: Sloga Temerin
- 2007–2008: Crvena Zvezda Novi Sad
- 2008–2010: Cement Beočin

Senior career*
Years	Team	Apps	(Gls)
2010	Mladost Apatin	3	(0)
2010–2012	Novi Sad	51	(0)
2012–2013	Novi Pazar	8	(0)
2013	Inđija	14	(0)
2013–2014	Szigetszentmiklós	15	(0)
2014–2015	Radnik Surdulica	10	(1)
2015	Spartak Subotica	9	(0)
2015–2016	Radnik Bijeljina	23	(1)
2016–	Zrinjski Mostar	232	(17)
- * Club domestic league appearances and goals as of 12 September 2026

Slobodan Jakovljević (Serbian Cyrillic: Слободан Јаковљевић; born 26 May 1989) is a Serbian professional footballer who plays as a centre-back for Bosnian Premier League club Zrinjski Mostar.

== Career ==
Jakovljević was born in Pristina, and in his early career played for the youth teams of Sloga Temerin, Crvena Zvezda Novi Sad and Cement Beočin, before joining the first team of Mladost Apatin. In the 2010–11 season, he moved to Novi Sad for two seasons.

In the season 2012–13, he signed with Novi Pazar and played in the Serbian SuperLiga. On 11 August 2012, Jakovljević made his debut in the SuperLiga playing against Radnički Niš in a 3–0 home win.

After Novi Pazar, he also played for Inđija, Szigetszentmiklósi, Radnik Surdulica, Spartak Subotica and Radnik Bijeljina. With Radnik he won the 2015–16 Bosnian Cup.

In June 2016, Jakovljević signed with Zrinjski Mostar. On 22 June 2019, Jakovljević extended his contract with Zrinjski until June 2022.

== Career statistics ==
As of match played 12 September 2026

Appearances and goals by club, season and competition
Club	Season	League			National cup (Note: Includes Serbian Cup, Hungarian Cup, Bosnian Cup)		Continental		Other		Total	
Club	Season	Division	Apps	Goals	Apps	Goals	Apps	Goals	Apps	Goals	Apps	Goals
Mladost Apatin	2009–10	Serbian First League	3	0	—		—		—		3	0
Novi Sad	2010–11	Serbian First League	24	0	—		—		—		24	0
Novi Sad	2011–12	Serbian First League	27	0	1	0	—		—		28	0
Novi Sad	Total		51	0	1	0	—		—		52	0
Novi Pazar	2012–13	Serbian SuperLiga	8	0	—		—		—		8	0
Inđija	2012–13	Serbian First League	14	0	—		—		—		14	0
Szigetszentmiklós	2013–14	Nemzeti Bajnokság II	15	0	1	0	—		—		16	0
Radnik Surdulica	2014–15	Serbian First League	10	1	—		—		—		10	1
Spartak Subotica	2014–15	Serbian SuperLiga	9	0	1	0	—		—		10	0
Radnik Bijeljina	2015–16	Bosnian Premier League	23	1	7	1	—		—		30	2
Zrinjski Mostar	2016–17	Bosnian Premier League	22	3	3	0	2 (Note: Appearances in UEFA Champions League)	0	—		27	3
Zrinjski Mostar	2017–18	Bosnian Premier League	27	2	—		2	0	—		29	2
Zrinjski Mostar	2018–19	Bosnian Premier League	27	0	4	0	6 (Note: Two appearances in UEFA Champions League, four appearances in UEFA Europa League)	0	—		37	0
Zrinjski Mostar	2019–20	Bosnian Premier League	15	1	3	1	6 (Note: Appearances in UEFA Europa League)	0	—		24	2
Zrinjski Mostar	2020–21	Bosnian Premier League	30	1	2	0	3	0	—		35	1
Zrinjski Mostar	2021–22	Bosnian Premier League	31	3	2	0	—		—		33	3
Zrinjski Mostar	2022–23	Bosnian Premier League	26	3	6	2	1 (Note: Appearance(s) in UEFA Europa Conference League)	0	—		33	5
Zrinjski Mostar	2023–24	Bosnian Premier League	17	3	2	0	9 (Note: Two appearances in UEFA Champions League, two appearances in UEFA Europa League, five appearances in UEFA Conference League)	0	—		28	3
Zrinjski Mostar	2024–25	Bosnian Premier League	14	0	2	0	2	1	1 (Note: Appearance in the Bosnian Supercup)	0	19	1
Zrinjski Mostar	2025–26	Bosnian Premier League	17	1	2	0	6 (Note: Three appearances in UEFA Europa League, three appearances and one goal in UEFA Conference League)	1	1	0	26	2
Zrinjski Mostar	2026–27	Bosnian Premier League	6	0	0	0	1	0	—		7	0
Zrinjski Mostar	Total		232	17	26	3	38	2	2	0	298	22
Career total			365	19	36	4	38	2	2	0	441	25

== Honours ==
Radnik Bijeljina

- Bosnian Cup: 2015–16

Zrinjski Mostar

- Bosnian Premier League: 2016–17, 2017–18, 2021–22, 2022–23, 2024–25
- Bosnian Cup: 2022–23, 2023–24, 2025–26
- Bosnian Supercup: 2024, 2025
