= Muhamed Buljubašić =

Bosnian footballer (born 2004)

Personal information
- Date of birth: 4 July 2004 (age 22)
- Place of birth: Gračanica, Bosnia and Herzegovina
- Height: 1.80 m (5 ft 11 in)
- Position: Central midfielder

Team information
- Current team: Esenler Erokspor (on loan from Çaykur Rizespor)
- Number: 20

Youth career
- Sloboda Tuzla
- 2020–2021: Sarajevo

Senior career*
Years	Team	Apps	(Gls)
2021–2024	Sarajevo	30	(0)
2024–	Çaykur Rizespor	43	(0)
2026–	→ Esenler Erokspor (loan)	7	(1)

International career^{‡}
2020	Bosnia and Herzegovina U17	2	(0)
2021–2022	Bosnia and Herzegovina U19	9	(0)
2023–2026	Bosnia and Herzegovina U21	15	(1)
- * Club domestic league appearances and goals as of 13 September 2026 ‡ National team caps and goals as of 6 October 2026

Muhamed Buljubašić (pronounced [muxǎmed bǔʎubaʃitɕ]; born 4 July 2004) is a Bosnian professional footballer who plays as a central midfielder for TFF 1. Lig club Esenler Erokspor on loan from Çaykur Rizespor and the Bosnia and Herzegovina national under-21 team.

Buljubašić started his professional career at Sarajevo, before joining Çaykur Rizespor in 2024.

== Club career ==
=== Sarajevo ===
Buljubašić started playing football at Sloboda Tuzla, before joining Sarajevo's youth academy in 2020. In April 2021, he signed his first professional contract with the team. He made his professional debut against Sloboda Tuzla on 21 August at the age of 17.

In July 2023, he signed a new three-year deal with Sarajevo.

=== Rizespor ===
In July 2024, Buljubašić was transferred to Turkish side Rizespor for an undisclosed fee. He made his official debut for the club on 14 September against Galatasaray.

== International career ==
Buljubašić represented Bosnia and Herzegovina at all youth levels.

== Career statistics ==
As of match played 13 September 2026

Appearances and goals by club, season and competition
Club	Season	League			National cup (Note: Includes Bosnia and Herzegovina Cup, Turkish Cup)		Continental		Total	
Club	Season	Division	Apps	Goals	Apps	Goals	Apps	Goals	Apps	Goals
Sarajevo	2021–22	Bosnian Premier League	2	0	1	0	—		3	0
Sarajevo	2022–23	Bosnian Premier League	1	0	0	0	—		1	0
Sarajevo	2023–24	Bosnian Premier League	27	0	3	0	1 (Note: Appearance in UEFA Conference League)	0	31	0
Sarajevo	Total		30	0	4	0	1	0	35	0
Çaykur Rizespor	2024–25	Süper Lig	20	0	5	0	—		25	0
Çaykur Rizespor	2025–26	Süper Lig	23	0	6	0	—		29	0
Çaykur Rizespor	Total		43	0	11	0	—		54	0
Esenler Erokspor (loan)	2026–27	TFF 1. Lig	7	1	0	0	—		7	1
Career total			80	1	15	0	1	0	96	1

== Honours ==
Individual

- Bosnian Premier League Young Player of the Season: 2023–24
