= Miomir Đuričković =

Montenegrin footballer (born 1997)

Personal information
- Date of birth: 26 July 1997 (age 29)
- Place of birth: Podgorica, Montenegro, FR Yugoslavia
- Height: 1.91 m (6 ft 3 in)
- Positions: Centre-back; defensive midfielder

Team information
- Current team: Budućnost Podgorica
- Number: 22

Youth career
- –2016: Budućnost Podgorica

Senior career*
Years	Team	Apps	(Gls)
2016–2017	Cholet	4	(0)
2017–2018	Rudar Pljevlja	13	(0)
2018–2019	Iskra Danilovgrad	38	(1)
2019–2020	Grbalj	29	(1)
2020–2023	Budućnost Podgorica	97	(5)
2023–2024	Sarajevo	39	(0)
2025	Andijon	8	(0)
2025–	Budućnost Podgorica	26	(0)

International career
2013	Montenegro U17	3	(0)
2015	Montenegro U18	2	(0)
2016–2017	Montenegro U21	9	(0)
- * Club domestic league appearances and goals as of 18 September 2026

Miomir Đuričković (born 26 July 1997) is a Montenegrin professional footballer who plays as a centre-back or defensive midfielder for Montenegrin First League club Budućnost Podgorica. He has also represented Montenegro at youth international level.

== Club career ==
=== Early career ===
Đuričković came through the youth system of Budućnost Podgorica. In 2014, while playing for the club's youth team, he was invited for a trial with English club Reading after being scouted at an international youth tournament in Foča.

In July 2016, Đuričković left Budućnost to join French club SO Cholet. He returned to Montenegro the following year and subsequently played for Rudar Pljevlja, Iskra and Grbalj.

=== Budućnost Podgorica ===
Đuričković returned to Budućnost in July 2020. During the 2020–21 season, he established himself as a versatile member of the team, playing as a defensive midfielder, centre-back and right-back as Budućnost won both the league and the Montenegrin Cup.

Budućnost retained the Montenegrin Cup in 2021–22, with Đuričković appearing in the final victory over Dečić. He won his second league title with the club in 2022–23.

=== Sarajevo ===
On 4 September 2023, Đuričković joined Bosnian Premier League club Sarajevo, signing a contract until 2025. He made his league debut against Zrinjski Mostar later that month.

Đuričković became a regular starter during the 2023–24 season and was subsequently named team captain. His performances earned him the Ismir Pintol Trophy, an award presented by Sarajevo supporters to the club's most combative player of the season.

During his time at Sarajevo, Đuričković was increasingly used as a centre-back after previously playing primarily as a defensive midfielder. He left the club by mutual consent in January 2025 after one and a half seasons.

=== Andijon and return to Budućnost ===
On 18 January 2025, Đuričković signed a one-year contract with Uzbekistani club Andijon. His spell in Uzbekistan lasted until the summer of that year.

Đuričković returned to Budućnost in June 2025, signing a two-year contract until 2027. On his return he was primarily used as a centre-back, while continuing to feature in defensive midfield when required.

== International career ==
Đuričković represented Montenegro at several youth levels. He was part of the country's under-17 setup while a member of Budućnost's academy and later represented the under-19 team.

He later played for the Montenegro under-21 team, including appearances during qualification for the 2019 UEFA European Under-21 Championship.

== Career statistics ==
=== Club ===
As of match played 18 September 2026

Appearances and goals by club, season and competition
Club	Season	League			National cup (Note: Includes Coupe de France, Montenegrin Cup, Bosnian Cup, Uzbekistan Cup)		Continental		Total	
Club	Season	Division	Apps	Goals	Apps	Goals	Apps	Goals	Apps	Goals
Cholet	2016–17	Championnat National 2	4	0	0	0	—		4	0
Rudar Pljevlja	2017–18	Montenegrin First League	13	0	1	0	—		14	0
Iskra Danilovgrad	2017–18	Montenegrin First League	10	0	—		—		10	0
Iskra Danilovgrad	2018–19	Montenegrin First League	28	1	0	0	—		28	1
Iskra Danilovgrad	Total		38	1	0	0	—		38	1
Grbalj	2019–20	Montenegrin First League	29	1	3	0	—		32	1
Budućnost Podgorica	2020–21	Montenegrin First League	26	2	4	0	2 (Note: One appearance in UEFA Champions League, one appearance in UEFA Europa League)	0	32	2
Budućnost Podgorica	2021–22	Montenegrin First League	31	1	4	2	4 (Note: Two appearances in UEFA Champions League, two appearances in UEFA Europa Conference League)	0	39	3
Budućnost Podgorica	2022–23	Montenegrin First League	34	2	0	0	3 (Note: Appearances in UEFA Europa Conference League)	0	37	2
Budućnost Podgorica	2023–24	Montenegrin First League	6	0	0	0	3 (Note: Two appearances and one goal in UEFA Champions League, one appearance and one goal in UEFA Europa Conference League)	2	9	2
Budućnost Podgorica	Total		97	5	8	2	12	2	117	9
Sarajevo	2023–24	Bosnian Premier League	27	0	3	0	—		30	0
Sarajevo	2024–25	Bosnian Premier League	12	0	1	0	2	0	15	0
Sarajevo	Total		39	0	4	0	2	0	45	0
Andijon	2025	Uzbekistan Super League	8	0	2	0	—		10	0
Budućnost Podgorica	2025–26	Montenegrin First League	18	0	0	0	4 (Note: Two appearances in UEFA Champions League, two appearances in UEFA Conference League)	0	22	0
Budućnost Podgorica	2026–27	Montenegrin First League	8	0	0	0	—		8	0
Budućnost Podgorica	Total		26	0	0	0	4	0	30	0
Career total			254	7	18	2	18	2	290	11

== Honours ==
Budućnost Podgorica

- Montenegrin First League: 2020–21, 2022–23
- Montenegrin Cup: 2020–21, 2021–22

Individual

- Ismir Pintol Trophy: 2023–24
