= Ilija Mašić =

Bosnian footballer (born 1996)

Personal information
- Date of birth: 8 April 1999 (age 27)
- Place of birth: Tomislavgrad, Bosnia and Herzegovina
- Height: 1.93 m (6 ft 4 in)
- Positions: Centre-back; defensive midfielder

Team information
- Current team: CFR Cluj
- Number: 4

Youth career
- –2019: Široki Brijeg

Senior career*
Years	Team	Apps	(Gls)
2019–2023	Široki Brijeg	71	(3)
2018–2019	→ Neretvanac (loan)	27	(7)
2020	→ Croatia Zmijavci (loan)	3	(0)
2023–2024	Lokomotiva	1	(0)
2024	→ Široki Brijeg (loan)	15	(0)
2024–2026	Zrinjski Mostar	29	(0)
2026–	CFR Cluj	2	(0)
- * Club domestic league appearances and goals as of 30 January 2026

Ilija Mašić (born 8 April 1999) is a Bosnian professional footballer who plays as a centre-back or a defensive midfielder for Liga I club CFR Cluj.

== Career statistics ==
=== Club ===
As of match played 10 February 2026

Club	Season	League			National Cup (Note: Includes Croatian Cup, Bosnian Cup, Cupa României)		Europe		Other		Total	
Club	Season	Division	Apps	Goals	Apps	Goals	Apps	Goals	Apps	Goals	Apps	Goals
Neretvanac (loan)	2018–19	3. HNL	27	7	2	0	–		–		29	7
Široki Brijeg	2019–20	Bosnian Premier League	0	0	1	0	0	0	–		1	0
Široki Brijeg	2020–21	Bosnian Premier League	17	0	1	0	–		–		18	0
Široki Brijeg	2021–22	Bosnian Premier League	23	0	2	0	2 (Note: Appearances in UEFA Conference League)	0	–		27	0
Široki Brijeg	2022–23	Bosnian Premier League	31	3	1	0	–		–		32	3
Široki Brijeg	Total		71	3	5	0	2	0	–		78	3
Croatia Zmijavci (loan)	2019–20	2. HNL	3	0	–		–		–		3	0
Lokomotiva	2023–24	HNL	1	0	0	0	–		–		1	0
Lokomotiva	2024–25	HNL	0	0	–		–		–		0	0
Lokomotiva	Total		1	0	0	0	–		–		0	0
Široki Brijeg (loan)	2023–24	Bosnian Premier League	15	0	4	0	–		–		19	0
Zrinjski Mostar	2024–25	Bosnian Premier League	19	0	2	0	–		–		21	0
Zrinjski Mostar	2025–26	Bosnian Premier League	10	0	0	0	9 (Note: Three appearances in UEFA Champions League, two appearances in UEFA Europa League, four appearances in UEFA Conference League)	0	–		19	0
Zrinjski Mostar	Total		29	0	2	0	9	0	–		40	0
CFR Cluj	2025–26	Liga I	2	0	1	0	–		–		3	0
CFR Cluj	2026–27	Liga I	0	0	0	0	0	0	–		3	0
CFR Cluj	Total		2	0	1	0	0	0	–		3	0
Career total			148	10	14	0	11	0	–		173	10

== Honours ==
Zrinjski Mostar

- Bosnian Premier League: 2024–25
- Bosnian Supercup: 2024
