= Josip Ćorluka =

Bosnian-Herzegovinian footballer (born 1995)

Personal information
- Date of birth: 3 March 1995 (age 31)
- Place of birth: Grude, Bosnia and Herzegovina
- Height: 1.84 m (6 ft 0 in)
- Position: Right-back

Team information
- Current team: Zagłębie Lubin
- Number: 16

Youth career
- 2010–2014: Široki Brijeg

Senior career*
Years	Team	Apps	(Gls)
2014–2019	Široki Brijeg	106	(3)
2019–2020	Domžale	14	(0)
2020–2025	Zrinjski Mostar	132	(5)
2025–	Zagłębie Lubin	41	(2)
2025	Zagłębie Lubin II	1	(0)

International career
2011	Bosnia and Herzegovina U17 (Note: Official UEFA matches only.)	3	(0)
2012–2013	Bosnia and Herzegovina U19	6	(0)
2015	Bosnia and Herzegovina U21		
2020–2021	Bosnia and Herzegovina	3	(0)
- * Club domestic league appearances and goals as of 12:08, 16 August 2026 (UTC)

Josip Ćorluka (born 3 March 1995) is a Bosnian professional footballer who plays as a right-back for Ekstraklasa club Zagłębie Lubin.

== International career ==
In October 2020, Ćorluka was called up to represent the Bosnia and Herzegovina national team, for a friendly game against Iran and for the 2020–21 UEFA Nations League games against Netherlands and Italy. He debuted in a home loss against Iran on 12 November 2020.

== Career statistics ==
=== International ===
Appearances and goals by national team and year
National team	Year	Apps	Goals
Bosnia and Herzegovina
Bosnia and Herzegovina	2020	2	0
Bosnia and Herzegovina	2021	1	0
Total		3	0

== Honours ==
Široki Brijeg

- Bosnian Cup: 2016–17

Zrinjski Mostar

- Bosnian Premier League: 2021–22, 2022–23
- Bosnian Cup: 2022–23, 2023–24
