= Tarik Kapetanović =

Bosnian footballer

Personal information
- Date of birth: 6 June 2003 (age 23)
- Place of birth: Tuzla, Bosnia and Herzegovina
- Height: 1.84 m (6 ft 0 in)
- Position: Left-back

Youth career
- –2021: Sloboda Tuzla

Senior career*
Years	Team	Apps	(Gls)
2021–2023	Sloboda Tuzla	43	(1)
2023–2026	Sarajevo	12	(0)
2023	→ Sloboda Tuzla (loan)	10	(1)
2026	→ Posušje (loan)	2	(0)

International career
2021–2022	Bosnia and Herzegovina U19	12	(0)
2022–2023	Bosnia and Herzegovina U21	4	(0)
- * Club domestic league appearances and goals as of 12 June 2026

Tarik Kapetanović (born 6 June 2003) is a Bosnian professional footballer who plays as a left-back.

== Club career ==
On 24 February 2021, Kapetanović signed a professional contract with his hometown club Sloboda Tuzla. After two seasons with the club, he was signed by Sarajevo for an undisclosed transfer fee on 7 August 2023. On 30 August 2023, Kapetanović was loaned to his previous club Sloboda Tuzla until the end of the year.

== Career statistics ==
=== Club ===
As of match played 14 September 2025

Appearances and goals by club, season and competition
Club	Season	League			National cup (Note: Includes Bosnia and Herzegovina Cup)		Continental		Total	
Club	Season	Division	Apps	Goals	Apps	Goals	Apps	Goals	Apps	Goals
Sloboda Tuzla	2020–21	Bosnian Premier League	0	0	0	0	—		0	0
Sloboda Tuzla	2021–22	Bosnian Premier League	13	0	2	0	—		15	0
Sloboda Tuzla	2022–23	Bosnian Premier League	30	1	2	0	—		32	1
Sloboda Tuzla	Total		43	1	4	0	—		47	1
Sarajevo	2023–24	Bosnian Premier League	7	0	2	0	0	0	9	0
Sarajevo	2024–25	Bosnian Premier League	3	0	0	0	—		3	0
Sarajevo	2025–26	Bosnian Premier League	2	0	0	0	0	0	2	0
Sarajevo	Total		12	0	2	0	0	0	14	0
Sloboda Tuzla (loan)	2023–24	First League of FBiH	10	1	2	1	—		12	2
Career total			65	2	8	1	0	0	73	3

== Honours ==
Sarajevo

- Bosnian Cup: 2024–25
