= Luka Lukanić =

Croatian footballer (born 2004)

Personal information
- Date of birth: 3 May 2004 (age 22)
- Place of birth: Zagreb, Croatia
- Height: 1.81 m (5 ft 11 in)
- Position: Midfielder

Team information
- Current team: Bravo
- Number: 42

Youth career
- –2011: NK Bistra
- 2011–2023: Dinamo Zagreb

Senior career*
Years	Team	Apps	(Gls)
2021–2022	Dinamo Zagreb II	1	(0)
2023–2024	Dinamo Zagreb	0	(0)
2023–2024	→ Zrinjski Mostar (loan)	6	(1)
2024–2025	Jong Genk	11	(1)
2025–2026	Domžale	9	(0)
2026–	Bravo	2	(0)

International career^{‡}
2019	Croatia U15	4	(0)
2020	Croatia U16	3	(0)
2020	Croatia U17	2	(0)
2021–2022	Croatia U18	8	(1)
2022–2023	Croatia U19	9	(0)
Medal record
20 May 2024
- * Club domestic league appearances and goals as of 15 March 2026 ‡ National team caps and goals as of 3 July 2024

Luka Lukanić (born 3 May 2004) is a Croatian professional footballer who plays as a midfielder for Slovenian PrvaLiga club Bravo. He previously played for Bosnian Premier League club Zrinjski Mostar and Dinamo Zagreb.

== Club career ==
Born in Zagreb, Lukanić joined the Dinamo Zagreb Academy in 2011 from NK Bistra, growing through all the youth ranks of the team, along the likes of Moreno Živković.

He signed his first professional contract with the club in October 2022, as he became a regular with the under-19 team that played the 2022–23 Youth League.

Having already been included in the first team training sessions during the 2022–23 season, Luka Lukanić made his professional debut for Dinamo Zagreb on the 2 August 2023, coming on as a substitute during the Champions League qualifying 2–0 win against FC Astana.

Winning the 2022-23 Croatian League title with Dinamo, Lukanić was sent on loan to Bosnian club Zrinjski Mostar, where he was in the squad that won the 2024 Bosnian Cup, but he did not play in eithe rleg of the final against FK_Borac Banja Luka. In the aftermath of this success, Lukanić was sold to Belgian Pro League club Racing Genk in the aftermath of the arrival of new German coach Torsten Fink.

== International career ==
Lukanić is a youth international for Croatia, first receiving a call with the under-18 in August 2023.

== Honours ==
Dinamo Zagreb

- Croatian Football League: 2022–23

Zrinjski Mostar

- Bosnian Cup: 2023–24
