= Nikola Pejović =

Montenegrin footballer

Personal information
- Full name: Nikola Pejović
- Date of birth: 1 March 2001 (age 25)
- Place of birth: Mojkovac, Yugoslavia
- Height: 1.85 m (6 ft 1 in)
- Position: Goalkeeper

Team information
- Current team: Arsenal Tivat
- Number: 31

Youth career
- –2019: Zemun

Senior career*
Years	Team	Apps	(Gls)
2019–2021	Zemun	18	(0)
2021–2022	Rad	4	(0)
2022–2024	Borac Čačak	0	(0)
2024–	Arsenal Tivat	4	(0)

International career
2019	Montenegro U19	2	(0)
- * Club domestic league appearances and goals as of 2 April 2025

Nikola Pejović (born 1 March 2001) is a Montenegrin professional footballer who plays for Arsenal Tivat. Earlier in career, he played for Zemun, Rad and Borac Čačak.
