= Marin Magdić =

Croatian footballer (born 1999)

Personal information
- Date of birth: 13 April 1999 (age 27)
- Place of birth: Osijek, Croatia
- Height: 1.84 m (6 ft 0 in)
- Position: Defender

Youth career
- 2009–2010: Grafičar-Vodovod
- 2010–2018: Osijek

Senior career*
Years	Team	Apps	(Gls)
2016–2020	Osijek II	51	(1)
2019	→ Sesvete (loan)	5	(0)
2021–2025	Zrinjski Mostar	38	(2)
- * Club domestic league appearances and goals as of 26 May 2024

Marin Magdić (born 13 April 1999) is a Croatian professional footballer who plays as a defender for Bosnian Premier League club Zrinjski Mostar.

== Honours ==
Zrinjski Mostar

- Bosnian Premier League: 2021–22, 2022–23
- Bosnian Cup: 2022–23, 2023–24
