= Matija Malekinušić =

Croatian footballer (born 1999)

Personal information
- Date of birth: 27 January 1999 (age 27)
- Place of birth: Zagreb, Croatia
- Height: 1.80 m (5 ft 11 in)
- Position: Right winger

Team information
- Current team: Novi Pazar
- Number: 17

Youth career
- 2008–2010: Dinamo Osekovo
- 2010–2013: Segesta
- 2013–2018: Dinamo Zagreb

Senior career*
Years	Team	Apps	(Gls)
2018–2019	Trnje	29	(7)
2019–2021	Sesvete	45	(6)
2021–2025	Zrinjski Mostar	103	(8)
2025–	Novi Pazar	17	(2)
- * Club domestic league appearances and goals as of 11:09, 18 April 2026 (UTC)

Matija Malekinušić (born 27 January 1999) is a Croatian professional footballer who plays as a winger for Serbian SuperLiga club Novi Pazar.

== Honours ==
Zrinjski Mostar

- Bosnian Premier League: 2021–22, 2022–23, 2024–25
- Bosnian Cup: 2022–23, 2023–24
- Supercup of Bosnia and Herzegovina: 2024
