= Halldór Árnason =

Icelandic football manager

Personal information
- Full name: Halldór Árnason
- Date of birth: 16 May 1984 (age 42)
- Place of birth: Reykjavík, Iceland
- Positions: Forward; winger

Youth career
- 1990-2002: KR
- 2002: Grótta
- 2003: KR

Senior career*
Years	Team	Apps	(Gls)
2002	Grótta	3	(1)
2004-2007	Grótta	36	(12)
2007-2011	KV Vesturbær	32	(5)

Managerial career
- 2007-2011: KR (youth)
- 2010-2011: KV Vesturbær (assistant)
- 2011-2014: KV Vesturbær
- 2015-2017: Stjarnan (youth)
- 2017-2019: Grótta (assistant)
- 2019-2023: Breiðablik (assistant)
- 2023-2025: Breiðablik
- 2026-: Valur
- * Club domestic league appearances and goals

Halldór Árnason (born 16 May 1984) is an Icelandic football manager and former player. He was the head coach of Breiðablik when the club won the 2024 Besta deild karla title in his debut full season in charge.

== Playing career ==
Árnason came through the youth systems of KR Reykjavík and Grótta. He spent his senior career in Iceland's lower divisions with Grótta and KV Vesturbær.

== Coaching career ==
Prior to his head coaching career, Árnason coached KR Reykjavík's youth teams from 2007 to 2011.

=== KV Vesturbær ===
Árnason became co-head coach of 2. deild karla club KV Vesturbær in 2011 alongside Páll Kristjánsson. The club won promotion to the 1. deild karla in 2013 before being relegated the following season. Árnason and Kristjánsson were named 2. deild karla Coaches of the Year in 2013.

=== Stjarnan ===
Árnason coached the under-19 team at Stjarnan from 2015 to 2017.

=== Grótta ===
In 2017, Árnason joined Grótta as assistant coach to Óskar Hrafn Þorvaldsson. The club won promotion from the 2. deild karla in 2018 and from the 1. deild karla in 2019, securing promotion to the top division for the first time in the club's history. At the end of 2019, Árnason joined Breiðablik as assistant coach to Þorvaldsson.

=== Breiðablik ===
Árnason served as assistant coach at Breiðablik from 2019 to 2023. He was appointed head coach in October 2023, taking charge of the club's remaining UEFA Conference League group stage matches.

In 2024, Breiðablik won the Besta deild karla (Icelandic top division) and the Lengjubikarinn (League Cup). In his debut season, Árnason set a new points record for a debut head coach in the Besta deild karla.

In 2025, the club won the Meistarakeppni KSÍ (Super Cup). They qualified for the league stage of the 2025–26 UEFA Conference League through the play-offs. In August 2025, Árnason extended his contract with the club until 2028.

Árnason left the club on 20 October 2025, with one league match remaining in the season.

=== Valur ===
On 29 June 2026, it was announced that Árnason would become head coach of Valur on a five-year contract, taking over on 1 November 2026.

== Individual honours ==
Árnason was named 2. deild Coach of the Year in 2013 and Besta deild Coach of the Year in 2024.

== Honours ==
=== Manager ===
Breiðablik

- Besta deild karla: 2024
- Lengjubikarinn: 2024
- Meistarakeppni KSÍ: 2025

=== Individual ===
- 2. deild Coach of the Year: 2013
- Besta deild Coach of the Year: 2024
