= David Vuković =

Bosnian footballer (born 2003)

Personal information
- Full name: David Vuković
- Date of birth: 21 December 2003 (age 22)
- Place of birth: Banja Luka, Bosnia and Herzegovina
- Height: 1.87 m (6 ft 2 in)
- Position: Winger

Team information
- Current team: Borac Banja Luka
- Number: 10

Youth career
- Omladinac
- 2016–2022: Borac Banja Luka

Senior career*
Years	Team	Apps	(Gls)
2020–	Borac Banja Luka	50	(17)
2022–2023	→ Laktaši (loan)	47	(9)

International career
2024	Bosnia and Herzegovina U21	1	(0)
- * Club domestic league appearances and goals as of 9 August 2026

David Vuković (Serbian Cyrillic: Давид Вуковић, pronounced [dâːʋid ʋûːkoʋitɕ]; born 21 December 2003) is a Bosnian professional footballer who plays as a winger for Bosnian Premier League club Borac Banja Luka. He also played for Bosnia and Herzegovina U21 national team.

Vuković started his professional career at Borac Banja Luka, who loaned him to Laktaši in 2022, then a member of First League of the Republika Srpska.

== Club career ==
=== Early career ===
Vuković started playing football at a local club Omladinac, before joining the youth academy of his hometown team Borac Banja Luka in 2016.

=== Laktaši ===
In July 2022, he was sent on a season-long loan to Laktaši. In August 2023, his loan was extended for an additional season. He made his professional debut against Željezničar Banja Luka on 6 August at the age of 18. On 10 September, he scored his first professional goal in a triumph over Modriča.

=== Borac Banja Luka ===
Vuković received very good reviews for his performances, and was also called the "golden boy" of Borac. With his club, he won the national championship and also reached the final of the national cup. The footballer did not leave the starting line-up of his team until the last round of the season, when the championship was already achieved. Thanks to Vuković's good form, there were rumours about interest and a potential transfer to Raków Częstochowa and RB Salzburg.

The 2024/25 season began for Borac with promotion to the league phase of the UEFA Conference League, however, the team from the Republika Srpska is taking part in them without Vuković, who asked to be substituted due to an injury in the league match against GOŠK on 2 September. A problem in his knee has ruled him out of action until at least the middle of the 2024-25 season.

Vuković scored a brace in a win over Rudar Prijedor at the start of the 2025-26 domestic championship.

== International career ==
Vuković was a member of the Bosnia and Herzegovina under-21 team.

Vuković received a call-up to the Bosnian first team, but rejected it after a few days.

== Career statistics ==
=== Club ===
As of match played 13 August 2026

Appearances and goals by club, season and competition
Club	Season	League			Bosnian Cup		Continental		Other		Total	
Club	Season	Division	Apps	Goals	Apps	Goals	Apps	Goals	Apps	Goals	Apps	Goals
Borac Banja Luka	2020–21	Bosnian Premier League	1	0	–		–		–		1	0
Borac Banja Luka	2023–24	Bosnian Premier League	14	6	6	1	–		–		20	7
Borac Banja Luka	2024–25	Bosnian Premier League	11	5	3	0	9 (Note: Four appearances in UEFA Champions League; one appearance in UEFA Europa League; four appearances and one goal in UEFA Conference League)	1	1 (Note: Appearance in Bosnian Supercup)	0	24	6
Borac Banja Luka	2025–26	Bosnian Premier League	23	6	0	0	2 (Note: Appearances in UEFA Conference League)	0	–		25	6
Borac Banja Luka	2026–27	Bosnian Premier League	1	0	0	0	6 (Note: Two appearances in UEFA Champions League; four appearances in UEFA Conference League)	0	–		7	0
Borac Banja Luka	Total		50	17	9	1	17	1	1	0	77	19
Laktaši (loan)	2022–23	First League of the RS	31	7	2	0	–		–		33	7
Laktaši (loan)	2023–24	First League of the RS	16	2	1	0	–		–		17	2
Laktaši (loan)	Total		47	9	3	0	–		–		50	9
Career total			97	26	12	1	17	1	1	0	127	28

== Honours ==
Borac Banja Luka

- Bosnian Premier League: 2020–21, 2023–24, 2025–26
