= 2024 Supercup of Bosnia and Herzegovina =

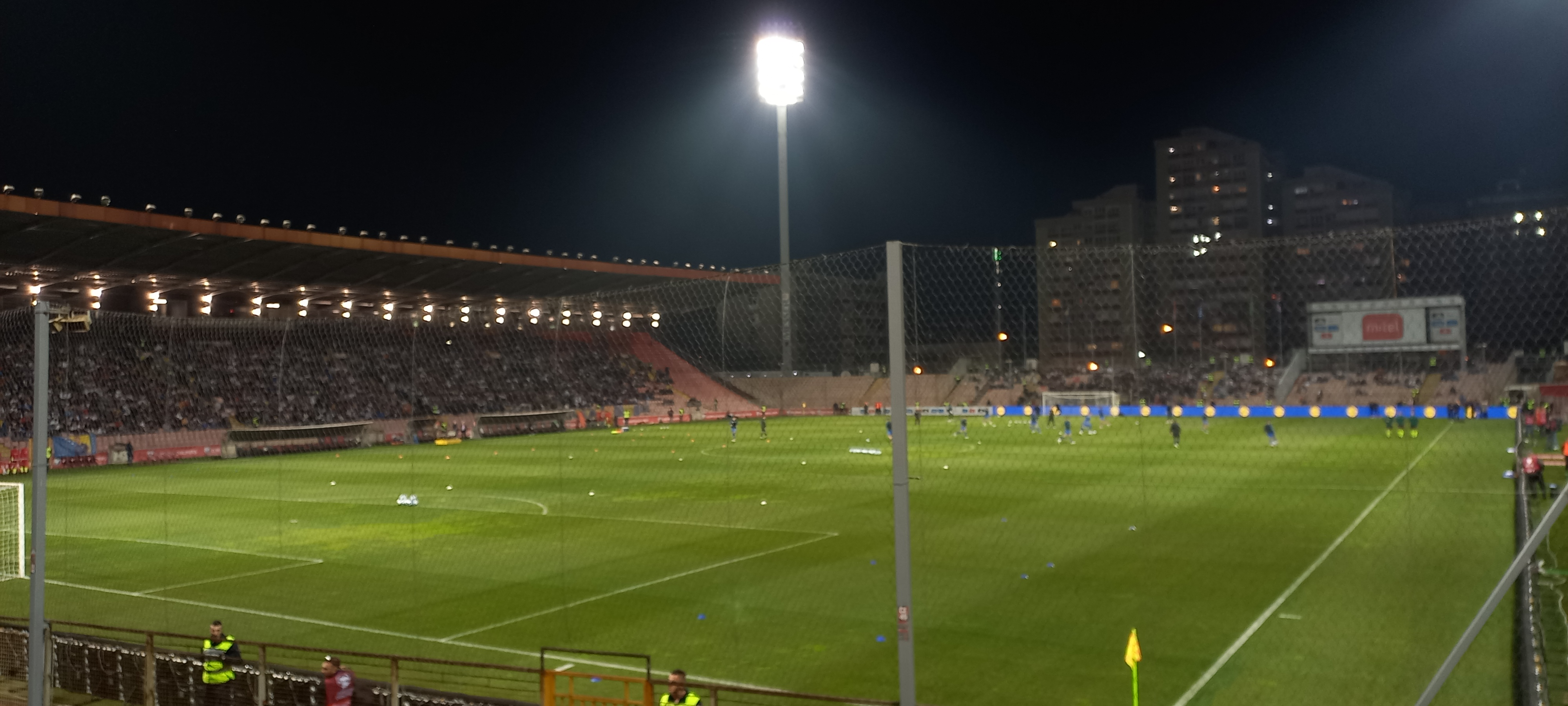
- Bilino Polje Stadium hosted the match
Borac Banja Luka	Zrinjski Mostar
0	1
- Date: 22 May 2025
- Venue: Bilino Polje Stadium, Zenica
- Referee: Nihad Ljajić (Sarajevo)

The 2024 Supercup of Bosnia and Herzegovina was the 6th Supercup of Bosnia and Herzegovina, an annual association football match contested by the winners of the previous season's Bosnian Premier League and Bosnian Cup competitions. It was played at Bilino Polje Stadium in Zenica on 22 May 2025, and featured the 2023–24 Bosnian Premier League winners Borac Banja Luka and the 2023–24 Bosnian Cup winners Zrinjski Mostar.

This was the first supercup in Bosnia and Herzegovina since 2001, following its revamp in 2024. Zrinjski defeated Borac 1–0 for their first supercup title.

== Background ==
Borac Banja Luka and Zrinjski Mostar qualified for the 2024 Bosnian Supercup as the winners of the 2023–24 Bosnian Premier League and the 2023–24 Bosnian Cup, respectively. It was the first appearance for both Borac and Zrinjski in a supercup match.

== Match ==
=== Details ===
22 May 2025
20:30

Borac Banja Luka	0–1	Zrinjski Mostar
	Report	Bilbija 78'

Bilino Polje Stadium, Zenica
Referee: Nihad Ljajić (Sarajevo)
