= 2023–24 Bosnia and Herzegovina Football Cup =

Football tournament season

28th Bosnia and Herzegovina Football Cup

Tournament details
- Country: Bosnia and Herzegovina
- Dates: 26 September 2023 – 23 May 2024
- Teams: 32

Final positions
- Champions: Zrinjski Mostar (3rd title)
- Runners-up: Borac

Tournament statistics
- Matches played: 38
- Goals scored: 99 (2.61 per match)
- Top goal scorer(s): Mario Ćuže (4 goals)

The 2023–24 Bosnia and Herzegovina Football Cup was the 28th edition of Bosnia and Herzegovina's annual football cup, and the twenty third season of the unified competition. The winners of the cup qualified for the 2024–25 UEFA Conference League second qualifying round.

Zrinjski Mostar were the defending champions. They retained the trophy after beating Borac Banja Luka in the final.

== Calendar ==
Round	Date(s)
First round	19 September 2023 (draw); 26, 27 and 28 September, 18 October, 2 and 29 November 2023
Second round	21 December 2023 (draw); 9, 10 and 11 February 2024
Quarter-finals	13 February 2024 (draw); 28 February and 6 March 2024 (leg 1); 12, 13 and 14 March 2024 (leg 2)
Semi-finals	21 March 2024 (draw); 3 April 2024 (leg 1); 16 and 17 April 2024 (leg 2)
Final	18 April 2024 (draw)^{1} 8 May 2024 (leg 1); 23 May 2024 (leg 2)

^{1} Draw was held to determine which team hosted which leg.

== Bracket ==
Quarter-finals
Posušje	3	0	3
Sloga Meridian	2	2	4
Jedinstvo Bihać	0	0	0
Zrinjski Mostar	1	2	3
Široki Brijeg	2	3	5
Velež Mostar	1	2	3
Borac Banja Luka	0	3	3
Sarajevo	0	0	0

Semi-finals
Sloga Meridian	0	0	0
Zrinjski Mostar	0	3	3
Široki Brijeg	1	1	2
Borac Banja Luka	3	2	5

Final
Zrinjski Mostar	1	1	2
Borac Banja Luka	0	0	0

== First round ==
The first round matches were played on 26, 27 and 28 September, 18 October, 2 and 29 November 2023. Zrinjski Mostar began the defence of their title with a 6–0 win over Čelik Zenica – the joint-biggest of the round – and Borac Banja Luka defeated Radnik Hadžići 1–0. Velež Mostar also recorded a 6–0 win over Bosna Visoko.

First round
Home team	Away team	Result
Slavija Sarajevo (II)	Leotar (II)	2–1
Bosna Visoko (III)	Velež Mostar (I)	0–6
Bratstvo Bosanska Krupa (III)	Zvijezda 09 (I)	1–3
Brotnjo (III)	GOŠK Gabela (I)	0–5
TOŠK Tešanj (II)	Igman Konjic (I)	0–1
Sloga Uskoplje (III)	Sarajevo (I)	1–4
Radnik Bijeljina (II)	Sloga Meridian (I)	0–2
Tomislav (II)	Posušje (I)	1–1 (2–3 p)
Laktaši (II)	Goražde (II)	1–1 (8–7 p)
Stupčanica Olovo (II)	Rudar Prijedor (II)	2–1
Kozara Gradiška (II)	Jedinstvo Bihać (II)	1–2
Sloboda Tuzla (II)	Željezničar (I)	1–0
Tekstilac Derventa (III)	Tuzla City (I)	0–1
Čelik Zenica (II)	Zrinjski Mostar (I)	0–6
Radnik Hadžići (II)	Borac Banja Luka (I)	0–1
Sutjeska Foča (II)	Široki Brijeg (I)	1–1 (3–4 p)

== Second round ==
The second round matches were played on 9, 10 and 11 February 2024. Zrinjski Mostar continued their title defence with a 3–0 win over Slavija Sarajevo and Borac Banja Luka recorded a 2–0 win against Zvijezda 09.

Second round
Home team	Away team	Result
Velež Mostar (I)	Tuzla City (I)	3–2
Jedinstvo Bihać (II)	GOŠK Gabela (I)	0–0 (4–2 p)
Zrinjski Mostar (I)	Slavija Sarajevo (II)	3–0
Posušje (I)	Laktaši (II)	2–0
Sloboda Tuzla (II)	Sarajevo (I)	1–1 (2–4 p)
Stupčanica Olovo (II)	Široki Brijeg (I)	2–2 (2–4 p)
Sloga Meridian (I)	Igman Konjic (I)	1–0
Borac Banja Luka (I)	Zvijezda 09 (I)	2–0

== Quarter-finals ==
The first legs were played on 28 February and 6 March 2024 and the return legs were played on 12, 13 and 14 March 2024.

In the first legs, Posušje won 3–2 against Sloga Meridian, Jedinstvo Bihać lost 1–0 to Zrinjski Mostar, Borac Banja Luka and Sarajevo drew 0–0 and Široki Brijeg defeated Velež Mostar 2–1.

In the second legs, Sloga Meridian defeated Posušje 2–0 (4–3 on aggregate), Zrinjski Mostar won 2–0 against Jedinstvo Bihać (3–0 on aggregate) and Široki Brijeg defeated Velež Mostar 3–2 (5–3 on aggregate). Borac Banja Luka were awarded a 3–0 win against Sarajevo.

Quarter-finals
Team 1	Team 2	Leg 1	Leg 2	Agg. score
Posušje (I)	Sloga Meridian (I)	3–2	0–2	3–4
Jedinstvo Bihać (II)	Zrinjski Mostar (I)	0–1	0–2	0–3
Borac Banja Luka (I)	Sarajevo (I)	0–0	3–0 (Note: Borac were awarded a 3–0 win against Sarajevo after the latter's coaching staff ordered its players to leave the pitch in protest of multiple officiating decisions during the game.)	3–0
Široki Brijeg (I)	Velež Mostar (I)	2–1	3–2	5–3

== Semi-finals ==
First legs were played on 3 April, return legs were played on 16 and 17 April 2024.

The first legs saw Sloga Meridian draw 0–0 with Zrinjski Mostar and Široki Brijeg lost 3–1 to Borac Banja Luka.

In the second legs, Zrinjski Mostar defeated Sloga Meridian 3–0 (3–0 on aggregate) to advance to the final and Borac Banja Luka defeated Široki Brijeg 2–1 (5–2 on aggregate) to advance to the final.

Semi-finals
Team 1	Team 2	Leg 1	Leg 2	Agg. score
Sloga Meridian (I)	Zrinjski Mostar (I)	0–0	0–3	0–3
Široki Brijeg (I)	Borac Banja Luka (I)	1–3	1–2	2–5

== Final ==
First leg was played on 8 May, return leg was played on 23 May 2024. Zrinjski Mostar won both legs 1–0 against Borac Banja Luka as they successfully retained the trophy.

Final
Team 1	Team 2	Leg 1	Leg 2	Agg. score
Zrinjski Mostar (I)	Borac Banja Luka (I)	1–0	1–0	2–0

=== First leg ===
8 May 2024
18:00

Zrinjski Mostar	1–0	Borac Banja Luka
Ćuže 30'	Report

Stadion pod Bijelim Brijegom, Mostar
Attendance: 6,000
Referee: Sabrija Topalović (Zenica)

=== Second leg ===
23 May 2024
18:00

Borac Banja Luka	0–1	Zrinjski Mostar
	Report	Malekinušić 81'

Gradski stadion, Banja Luka
Referee: Irfan Peljto (Sarajevo)
