= 2025 Supercup of Bosnia and Herzegovina =

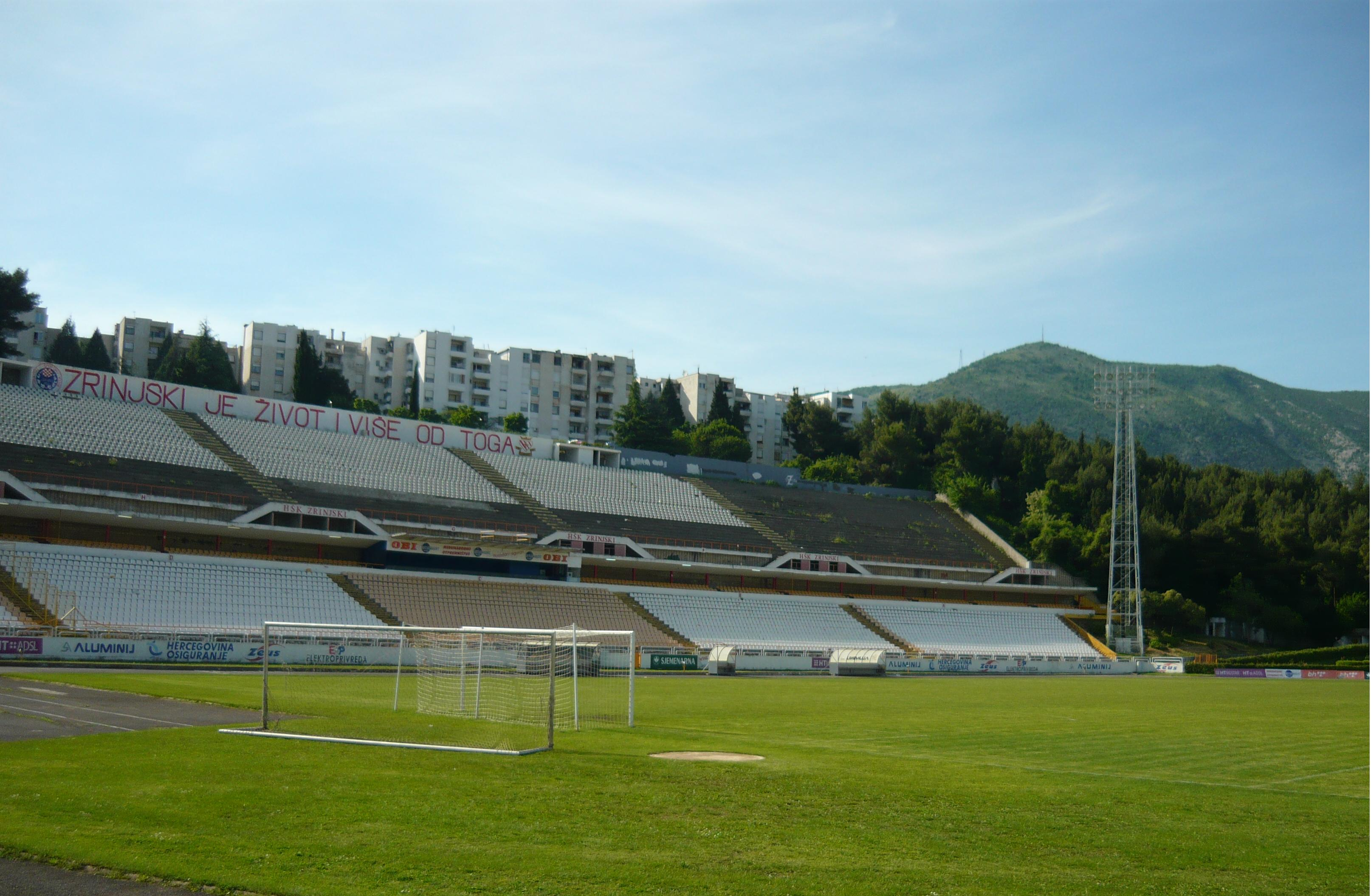
- Stadion pod Bijelim Brijegom hosted the match
Zrinjski Mostar	Sarajevo
0	0
- Zrinjski Mostar won 4–1 on penalties
- Date: 18 March 2026
- Venue: Stadion pod Bijelim Brijegom, Mostar
- Referee: Dragan Petrović (Banja Luka)

The 2025 Supercup of Bosnia and Herzegovina was the 7th Supercup of Bosnia and Herzegovina, an annual association football match contested by the winners of the previous season's Bosnian Premier League and Bosnian Cup competitions. The 2025 edition was played at Stadion pod Bijelim Brijegom in Mostar on 18 March 2026, and featured the 2024–25 Bosnian Premier League winners Zrinjski Mostar and the 2024–25 Bosnian Cup winners Sarajevo.

Zrinjski defended the trophy they won in 2024, winning 4–1 on penalties.

== Background ==
Zrinjski Mostar secured the 2024–25 Bosnian Premier League title, therefore qualifying for the Supercup as league champions. Sarajevo clinched the 2024–25 Bosnian Cup, earning their place as cup winners. This was Zrinjski's second supercup appearance after ending up victorious in the 2024 edition, while Sarajevo had previously appeared in three supercup matches, winning once.

== Match ==
=== Details ===
18 March 2026
18:30 CET

Zrinjski Mostar	0–0	Sarajevo
	Report
Penalties
Bilbija (penalty scored); Ilić (penalty scored); Mamić (penalty scored); Lagumdžija (penalty scored)	4–1	(penalty scored) Ristovski; (penalty missed) Bralić; (penalty missed) Menalo

Stadion pod Bijelim Brijegom, Mostar
Referee: Dragan Petrović (Banja Luka)

Zrinjski Mostar	Sarajevo

GK	18	(Bosnia and Herzegovina) Goran Karačić
DF	19	(Croatia) Marko Vranjković		(substituted off) 63'
DF	21	(Bosnia and Herzegovina) Igor Savić
DF	27	(Serbia) Slobodan Jakovljević (c)	(yellow card) 56'	(substituted off) 63'
DF	55	(Croatia) Duje Dujmović
DF	12	(Croatia) Petar Mamić
MF	5	(Croatia) Dan Lagumdžija	(yellow card) 39'
MF	20	(Croatia) Antonio Ivančić
FW	14	(Bosnia and Herzegovina) Matej Šakota		(substituted off) 74'
FW	77	(Croatia) Karlo Abramović		(substituted off) 83'
FW	25	(Croatia) Mario Ćuže		(substituted off) 74'
Substitutes:
GK	40	(Croatia) Marin Ljubić
DF	4	(Bosnia and Herzegovina) Hrvoje Barišić
DF	16	(Bosnia and Herzegovina) Mateo Sušić
DF	37	(Croatia) Darick Kobie Morris		(substituted on) 63'
DF	50	(Bosnia and Herzegovina) Kerim Memija		(substituted on) 63'
MF	17	(Croatia) Antonio Ilić		(substituted on) 74'
MF	22	(Bosnia and Herzegovina) Adi Nalić		(substituted on) 74'
MF	42	(Bosnia and Herzegovina) Marijan Ćavar
FW	9	(Croatia) Leo Mikić
FW	90	(Croatia) Toni Majić
FW	99	(Bosnia and Herzegovina) Nemanja Bilbija		(substituted on) 83'
Manager:
(Croatia) Igor Štimac

GK	31	(Croatia) Ivan Banić
DF	22	(Bosnia and Herzegovina) Amar Beganović		(substituted off) 90'
DF	33	(North Macedonia) Stefan Ristovski
DF	3	(Bosnia and Herzegovina) Renato Gojković	(yellow card) 42'
DF	28	(Croatia) Slavko Bralić
DF	4	(Bosnia and Herzegovina) Nermin Mujkić	(yellow card) 64'	(substituted off) 80'
MF	23	(Bosnia and Herzegovina) Anes Krdžalić
MF	59	(Bosnia and Herzegovina) Gojko Cimirot		(substituted off) 18'
MF	20	(North Macedonia) Agon Elezi
MF	88	(Serbia) Adem Ljajić (c)
FW	99	(Brazil) João Carlos
Substitutes:
GK	13	(Bosnia and Herzegovina) Sanin Mušija
DF	2	(Zimbabwe) Shane Maroodza		(substituted on) 80'
DF	6	(Canada) Jovan Ivanišević
DF	26	(Bosnia and Herzegovina) Daris Dizdarević
DF	27	(Croatia) Luka Hujber
DF	77	(Croatia) Mihael Kuprešak
MF	5	(Bosnia and Herzegovina) Rijad Telalović
MF	35	(Bosnia and Herzegovina) Sergej Ignatkov
FW	7	(Bosnia and Herzegovina) Luka Menalo	(yellow card) 54'	(substituted on) 18'
FW	9	(Bosnia and Herzegovina) Aldin Turkeš
FW	11	(Ghana) Francis Kyeremeh		(substituted on) 90'
Manager:
(Croatia) Mario Cvitanović

Assistant referees:
Amer Macić (Mostar)
Josip Čolić (Kupres)
Fourth official:
Frano Jelić (Široki Brijeg)
Video assistant referee:
Dragan Todić (Doboj)
Assistant video assistant referee:
Arnel Novalić (Doboj East)

Match rules

- 90 minutes
- Penalty shoot-out if scores level
- Maximum of eleven named substitutes
- Maximum of five substitutions
- Maximum of three substitution opportunities
