= 2025–26 FK Sarajevo season =

Sarajevo
2025–26 season
- Owner: Ismir Mirvić (Note: At the beginning of the season, ownership was divided between Vincent Tan (49.13%) and Ismir Mirvić (49.13%). In December 2025, Mirvić acquired Tan's remaining shares to become the sole majority owner of the club.)
- Adviser: Zoran Mamić
- Manager: Zoran Zekić (until 5 August); Husref Musemić (from 10 August to 29 September); Mario Cvitanović (from 30 September)
- Stadium: Asim Ferhatović Hase Stadium
- Bosnian Premier League: 3rd
- Bosnian Cup: Quarter-finals
- Bosnian Supercup: Runners-up
- UEFA Conference League: Second qualifying round
- Top goalscorer: League: Agon Elezi (9); All: Agon Elezi (9)
- Highest home attendance: 20,897 vs Universitatea Craiova (24 July 2025)
- Lowest home attendance: 1,000 vs Sloga Doboj (22 April 2026)
- Average home league attendance: 3,735
- Biggest win: Sarajevo 4–0 Željezničar (7 December 2025); Sarajevo 4–0 Sloga Doboj (22 April 2026)
- Biggest defeat: Universitatea Craiova 4–0 Sarajevo (31 July 2025)
Home colours	Away colours	Third colours

The 2025–26 Sarajevo season was the club's 77th season in history, and their 32nd consecutive season in the top flight of Bosnian football, the Bosnian Premier League. Besides competing in the Premier League, the team also competed in the National Cup, the National Supercup, and the qualifications for the UEFA Conference League as well.

== Squad information ==
=== First-team squad ===
As of 4 March 2026

Note: Flags indicate national team as defined under FIFA eligibility rules; some limited exceptions apply. Players may hold more than one non-FIFA nationality.

No.	Pos.	Nation	Player
2	DF	ZIM	Shane Maroodza
3	DF	BIH	Renato Gojković (3rd captain)
4	DF	BIH	Nermin Mujkić (5th captain)
5	MF	BIH	Rijad Telalović
6	DF	CAN	Jovan Ivanišević (on loan from Istra 1961)
7	FW	BIH	Luka Menalo
9	FW	BIH	Aldin Turkeš
10	FW	BRA	Renan Oliveira
11	FW	GHA	Francis Kyeremeh
13	GK	BIH	Sanin Mušija
20	MF	MKD	Agon Elezi
22	DF	BIH	Amar Beganović (4th captain)
23	MF	BIH	Anes Krdžalić

No.	Pos.	Nation	Player
24	FW	CRO	Filip Živković (on loan from Osijek)
27	DF	CRO	Luka Hujber
27	MF	BIH	Muamer Hamzić
28	DF	CRO	Slavko Bralić
31	GK	CRO	Ivan Banić
33	DF	MKD	Stefan Ristovski
38	DF	CIV	Souleymane Méité
40	GK	BIH	Faris Mehić
59	MF	BIH	Gojko Cimirot (vice-captain)
66	MF	CYP	Rafail Mamas
77	DF	CRO	Mihael Kuprešak
88	MF	SRB	Adem Ljajić (captain)
99	FW	BRA	João Carlos

=== Youth academy players ===
FK Sarajevo Academy players that received a first-team squad call-up.

No.	Pos.	Nation	Player
17	DF	BIH	Hamza Redžić
21	FW	BIH	Anes H. Mehmedović
26	DF	BIH	Daris Dizdarević
29	MF	BIH	Amar Cerić

No.	Pos.	Nation	Player
30	MF	BIH	Ante Pokrajčić
35	MF	UKR	Serhiy Ihnatkov
45	GK	BIH	Ibrahim Zahirović
55	MF	BIH	Kenan Vrban

=== Coaching staff ===
Position	Name
Head coach	(Croatia) Mario Cvitanović
Assistant coaches	(Croatia) Ivo Milić
Assistant coaches	(Croatia) Džemal Adilji
Goalkeeping coach	(Bosnia and Herzegovina) Adi Adilović
Fitness coaches	(Bosnia and Herzegovina) Emir Mustafović
Fitness coaches	(Croatia) Martin Vrgoč
Video analysts	(Bosnia and Herzegovina) Admir Kozlić
Video analysts	(Bosnia and Herzegovina) Kenan Handžić
Doctors	(Bosnia and Herzegovina) Dr. Reuf Karabeg
Doctors	(Bosnia and Herzegovina) Dr. Arman Pindžo
Doctors	(Bosnia and Herzegovina) Dr. Benjamin Kaknjašević
Physiotherapists	(Bosnia and Herzegovina) Ismar Hadžibajrić
Physiotherapists	(Bosnia and Herzegovina) Mirza Marevac
Physiotherapists	(Bosnia and Herzegovina) Eldin Jarović
Physiotherapists	(Bosnia and Herzegovina) Enes Beganović
Physiotherapists	(Croatia) Robert Krčmar
Technical staff manager	(Bosnia and Herzegovina) Mustafa Beridan
Equipment manager	(Bosnia and Herzegovina) Nermin Huskić
Equipment manager	(Bosnia and Herzegovina) Alen Ramović

== Transfers ==
=== In ===
Date	Pos.	Player	From	Fee	Ref.
1 June 2025	FW	(Croatia) Mihael Mlinarić	(Bosnia and Herzegovina) Velež Mostar	€250,000	
2 June 2025	MF	(Cyprus) Rafail Mamas	(Cyprus) AEL Limassol	€200,000	
21 June 2025	DF	(Romania) Grigore Turda	(Romania) Gloria Buzău	Free transfer	
24 June 2025	DF	(Montenegro) Ljubomir Pejović	(Montenegro) Mladost Donja Gorica	Free transfer	
27 June 2025	GK	(Croatia) Ivan Banić	(Croatia) Gorica	Free transfer	
10 July 2025	DF	(North Macedonia) Stefan Ristovski	(Croatia) Dinamo Zagreb	Free transfer	
16 July 2025	MF	(North Macedonia) Agon Elezi	(Germany) VfL Bochum	Free transfer	
20 July 2025	DF	(Croatia) Slavko Bralić	(Slovenia) Celje	Free transfer	
7 August 2025	MF	(Serbia) Adem Ljajić	(Serbia) Novi Pazar	Undisclosed	
19 August 2025	MF	(Bosnia and Herzegovina) Gojko Cimirot	(Saudi Arabia) Al-Fayha	Free transfer	
7 October 2025	DF	(Zimbabwe) Shane Maroodza	(Bosnia and Herzegovina) Sarajevo B	Free transfer	
20 November 2025	FW	(Portugal) Gelson Rocha	(Bosnia and Herzegovina) Sarajevo B	Free transfer	
8 January 2026	MF	(Bosnia and Herzegovina) Rijad Telalović	(Bosnia and Herzegovina) Čelik Zenica	€150,000	
21 January 2026	DF	(Croatia) Luka Hujber	(Denmark) Vejle	Undisclosed	
4 February 2026	FW	(Bosnia and Herzegovina) Luka Menalo	(Croatia) Rijeka	Free transfer	
10 February 2026	MF	(Belgium) Jack Senga	(Bosnia and Herzegovina) Sarajevo B	Free transfer	
19 February 2026	FW	(Brazil) João Carlos	(China) GZ-Power FC	Free transfer	
4 March 2026	DF	(Ivory Coast) Souleymane Méité	(Mali) Chiffo	Undisclosed	
Total				€600,000	

=== Out ===
Date	Pos.	Player	To	Fee	Ref.
2 June 2025	MF	(Montenegro) Marko Matanović	(Hungary) Kisvárda	Undisclosed	
12 June 2025	DF	(Bosnia and Herzegovina) Besim Šerbečić	(Bosnia and Herzegovina) Velež Mostar	End of contract	
12 June 2025	MF	(Croatia) Ivan Jelić Balta	(Slovenia) Koper	End of contract	
13 June 2025	FW	(Colombia) Kevin Viveros	(Colombia) Atlético Nacional	€1,210,000 (Note: Initial €1,210,000 plus 25% of any future transfer fee (€1,050,000 received following the player's transfer to Athletico Paranaense).)	
14 June 2025	DF	(Croatia) Vinko Soldo	(Turkey) Pendikspor	End of contract	
18 June 2025	GK	(Croatia) Lovre Rogić	(Cyprus) Anorthosis Famagusta	End of contract	
9 July 2025	MF	(Bosnia and Herzegovina) Eldar Mehmedović	(Serbia) Spartak Subotica	Free transfer (Note: FK Sarajevo retained a percentage of the player's next transfer)	
10 July 2025	DF	(Bosnia and Herzegovina) Elvir Duraković	(Croatia) Gorica	Free transfer	
14 July 2025	MF	(Luxembourg) Mirza Mustafić	(Indonesia) Bali United	End of contract	
19 July 2025	MF	(Montenegro) Vladan Bubanja	(Russia) Orenburg	€840,000 (Note: Initial €840,000 plus possible add-ons and percentage of any future transfer fee.)	
5 August 2025	FW	(Bosnia and Herzegovina) Harun Pločo	(Bosnia and Herzegovina) Travnik	Contract termination	
11 August 2025	FW	(Venezuela) Adalberto Peñaranda	(Venezuela) Deportivo Táchira	Contract termination	
1 September 2025	DF	(Croatia) Bruno Unušić	Free agent	Contract termination	
30 September 2025	MF	(The Gambia) Momodou Jatta	(United Arab Emirates) Al Jazira	€1,800,000 (Note: Initial €1,800,000 plus 15% of any future transfer fee.)	
15 December 2025	DF	(Serbia) Filip Jović	(Croatia) Slaven Belupo	Contract termination	
7 January 2026	FW	(Croatia) Karlo Butić	(Italy) Casertana	Free transfer	
8 January 2026	GK	(Serbia) Emil Rockov	Free agent	Contract termination	
8 January 2026	MF	(Croatia) Edin Julardžija	(Slovakia) Košice	Contract termination	
9 January 2026	FW	(Georgia (country)) Giorgi Guliashvili	(Spain) Racing de Santander	€2,500,000 (Note: Initial €2,500,000 plus €500,000 promotion bonus and 15% of any future transfer fee.)	
9 January 2026	DF	(Romania) Grigore Turda	(Lithuania) Žalgiris	Contract termination	
9 January 2026	DF	(Bulgaria) Martin Paskalev	(Bulgaria) Arda Kardzhali	Contract termination	
9 January 2026	DF	(Montenegro) Ljubomir Pejović	(Montenegro) Mladost Donja Gorica	Contract termination	
20 January 2026	MF	(Serbia) Aleksandar Đorđević	Free agent	Contract termination	
4 February 2026	FW	(Croatia) Mihael Mlinarić	(Poland) Zagłębie Lubin	€300,000	
Total				€6,650,000	

=== Loans in ===
Start date	End date	Pos.	Player	From	Ref.
7 September 2025	31 December 2025	FW	(Sweden) Anomnachi Chidi	(Slovenia) Celje	
5 February 2026	31 December 2026	DF	(Canada) Jovan Ivanišević	(Croatia) Istra 1961	
12 February 2026	31 December 2026	FW	(Croatia) Filip Živković	(Croatia) Osijek	

=== Loans out ===
Start date	End date	Pos.	Player	To	Ref.
17 July 2025	End of season	DF	(Bosnia and Herzegovina) Nikola Đurić	(Bosnia and Herzegovina) Radnik Bijeljina	
1 August 2025	31 December 2025	MF	(Bosnia and Herzegovina) Haris Ališah	(Bosnia and Herzegovina) Stupčanica Olovo	
8 September 2025	9 January 2026	DF	(Montenegro) Ljubomir Pejović	(Bosnia and Herzegovina) Igman Konjic	
28 September 2025	15 January 2026	FW	(Bosnia and Herzegovina) Aldin Turkeš	(United Arab Emirates) Al-Ittifaq	
7 January 2026	End of season	MF	(Bosnia and Herzegovina) Bakir Nurković	(Montenegro) Bokelj	
7 January 2026	End of season	DF	(Bosnia and Herzegovina) Tarik Kapetanović	(Bosnia and Herzegovina) Posušje	
7 January 2026	End of season	FW	(Serbia) Andreja Ristić	(Serbia) Javor Ivanjica	
7 February 2026	End of season	MF	(Bosnia and Herzegovina) Haris Ališah	(Bosnia and Herzegovina) Radnik Hadžići	
7 February 2026	End of season	MF	(Bosnia and Herzegovina) Amar Cerić	(Bosnia and Herzegovina) Radnik Hadžići	
10 February 2026	End of season	MF	(Belgium) Jack Senga	(Bosnia and Herzegovina) Igman Konjic	
18 February 2026	End of season	FW	(Portugal) Gelson Rocha	(Croatia) Orijent	

== Kit ==
Supplier	Sponsors	
(Germany) Adidas	(Turkey) Turkish Airlines	Front
(Germany) Adidas	(Bosnia and Herzegovina) Visit Sarajevo (Bosnia and Herzegovina) MeridianBet (Bosnia and Herzegovina) BH Telecom	Back
(Germany) Adidas	(Poland) R-GOL.com	Shoulder
(Germany) Adidas	(Bosnia and Herzegovina) AC BLOK	Sleeves

== Pre-season and friendlies ==
Win Draw Loss Fixtures

28 June 2025 Friendly	Novi Pazar (Serbia)	4–3	(Bosnia and Herzegovina) Sarajevo	Novi Pazar, Serbia
19:30 CEST (UTC+2)	Sieh 16', 60'; Opara 34'; Ljajić 71'	Report	Jatta 39'; Oliveira 50'; Ristić 56'	Stadium: Novi Pazar City Stadium; Attendance: 5,000; Referee: Stanko Ostraćanin (Kraljevo)

5 July 2025 Friendly	Vukovar 1991 (Croatia)	3–0	(Bosnia and Herzegovina) Sarajevo	Vukovar, Croatia
18:00 CEST (UTC+2)	Knöll 22' (pen.); Unušić 77' (o.g.); Gastaldelo 96'	Report		Stadium: Stadion Borovo naselje Referee: Ivan Dragun (Otok)
Note: The match was played in two 60-minute halves.

9 July 2025 Friendly	Sarajevo (Bosnia and Herzegovina)	2–0	(Czech Republic) Slovácko	Rogla, Slovenia
17:30 CET (UTC+1)	Mlinarić 37'; Mujkić (red card) 75'; Butić 85'	Report	Daníček (red card) 75'

12 July 2025 Friendly	Sarajevo (Bosnia and Herzegovina)	1–2	(Croatia) Varaždin	Rogla, Slovenia
17:30 CET (UTC+1)	Paskalev 73'	Report	Antunović 56'; Mamut 85'

14 July 2025 Friendly	Sarajevo (Bosnia and Herzegovina)	0–0	(Ukraine) Zorya Luhansk	Rogla, Slovenia
16:30 CET (UTC+1)		Report

5 September 2025 Friendly	Sarajevo (Bosnia and Herzegovina)	2–0	(Bosnia and Herzegovina) Sarajevo B	Butmir
	Ristić; Kuprešak	Report		Stadium: Butmir Training Centre

11 October 2025 Friendly	Sarajevo (Bosnia and Herzegovina)	5–0	(Bosnia and Herzegovina) Sarajevo B	Butmir
	Ristić, Butić; Julardžija; Mlinarić	Report		Stadium: Butmir Training Centre

14 November 2025 Friendly	Sarajevo (Bosnia and Herzegovina)	2–1	(Croatia) Vukovar 1991	Butmir
	Mlinarić; Butić	Report		Stadium: Butmir Training Centre

16 January 2026 Friendly	Sarajevo (Bosnia and Herzegovina)	Cancelled	(Bosnia and Herzegovina) Famos Hrasnica	Sarajevo
15:00 CET (UTC+1)				Stadium: Asim Ferhatović Hase Stadium
Note: The match was cancelled due to heavy snow

21 January 2026 Friendly	Sarajevo (Bosnia and Herzegovina)	0–0	(Ukraine) Zorya Luhansk	Belek, Antalya Province, Turkey
16:00 TRT (UTC+3)		Report

24 January 2026 Friendly	Sarajevo (Bosnia and Herzegovina)	Cancelled	(Slovakia) DAC 1904 Dunajská Streda	Antalya, Turkey
14:30 TRT (UTC+3)
Note: The match was cancelled due to heavy rain

25 January 2026 Friendly	Sarajevo (Bosnia and Herzegovina)	1–1	(Ukraine) Obolon Kyiv	Antalya, Turkey
14:00 TRT (UTC+3)	Oliveira 10'	Report	Ustymenko 42'

28 January 2026 Friendly	Sarajevo (Bosnia and Herzegovina)	2–3	(North Macedonia) Shkëndija	Antalya, Turkey
15:00 TRT (UTC+3)	Beganović 12'; 78' (o.g.)	Report	Ibraimi 17', 33' (pen.); Spahiu 56'

31 January 2026 Friendly	Sarajevo (Bosnia and Herzegovina)	1–2	(Ukraine) LNZ Cherkasy	Belek, Antalya Province, Turkey
11:00 TRT (UTC+3)	Gojković 90'	Report	Gojković 50' (o.g.); Kuzyk 53'

31 January 2026 Friendly	Sarajevo (Bosnia and Herzegovina)	0–0	(North Macedonia) Vardar	Belek, Antalya Province, Turkey
19:10 TRT (UTC+3)		Report

== Competitions ==
=== Overview ===
Competition	First match	Last match	Starting round	Final position	Record							
Competition	First match	Last match	Starting round	Final position	Pld	W	D	L	GF	GA	GD	Win %
Bosnian Premier League	3 August 2025	25 May 2026	Matchday 1	3rd	36	19	8	9	54	37	+17	52.78
Bosnian Cup	28 October 2025	11 March 2026	First round	Quarter-finals	4	2	0	2	5	5	+0	50.00
Bosnian Supercup	18 March 2026		Final	Runners-up	1	0	1	0	0	0	+0	0.00
Conference League	24 July 2025	31 July 2025	Second qualifying round	Second qualifying round	2	1	0	1	2	5	−3	50.00
Total					43	22	9	12	61	47	+14	51.16

Source: Competitions

=== Premier League of Bosnia and Herzegovina ===
==== League table ====
Pos	Team	Pld	W	D	L	GF	GA	GD	Pts	Qualification or relegation
1	Borac Banja Luka (C)	36	27	5	4	76	20	+56	86	Qualification for the Champions League first qualifying round
2	Zrinjski Mostar	36	21	8	7	48	25	+23	71	Qualification to Conference League second qualifying round
3	Sarajevo	36	19	8	9	54	37	+17	65	Qualification to Conference League first qualifying round
4	Velež Mostar	36	14	9	13	36	35	+1	51	Qualification to Conference League first qualifying round
5	Široki Brijeg	36	11	12	13	37	48	−11	45	

Source: Rezultati.com
Rules for classification: 1) Points; 2) Goal difference; 3) Goals scored; 4) Head-to-head points; 5) Head-to-head goal difference; 6) Head-to-head away goals (only if two teams); 7) Head-to-head goals scored; 8) Goal difference; 9) Play-off. (Criteria 2 and 3 are not used to decide champion, UEFA competition qualification, or relegation)
(C) Champions

==== Results summary ====
Overall								Home						Away					
Pld	W	D	L	GF	GA	GD	Pts	W	D	L	GF	GA	GD	W	D	L	GF	GA	GD
36	19	8	9	54	37	+17	65	12	5	1	33	12	+21	7	3	8	21	25	−4

Source: Sportsport.ba

==== Results by round ====
Round	2	3	4	5	6	1^{1}	7	8	9	10	11	12	13	14	15	16	17	18	19	20	21	22	23	24	25	26	27	28	29	30	31	32	33	34	35	36
Ground	H	A	H	A	H	A	A	H	A	H	A	H	A	H	A	H	A	H	A	H	A	H	A	H	A	H	A	H	A	H	A	H	A	H	A	H
Result	D	L	W	L	W	L	L	W	L	D	D	W	W	W	L	D	D	W	W	W	W	W	L	D	L	W	D	W	W	W	W	L	W	D	W	W
Position	6	7	6	8	6	7	8	6	7	7	7	5	5	4	4	5	5	3	3	3	3	3	3	3	3	3	3	3	3	3	3	3	3	3	3	3
Points	1	1	4	4	7	7	7	10	10	11	12	15	18	21	21	22	23	26	29	32	35	38	38	39	39	42	43	46	49	52	55	55	58	59	62	65

Source: Competitions
A = Away; H = Home; W = Win; D = Draw; L = Loss

^{1} Matchday 1 (vs Zrinjski Mostar) was postponed due to Zrinjski's participation in the UEFA Champions League second qualifying round and Sarajevo's participation in the UEFA Conference League second qualifying round.

==== Matches ====
3 August 2025 2	Sarajevo	4–4	Radnik Bijeljina	Sarajevo
18:45 CEST (UTC+2)	Elezi 16', 52'; Paskalev (yellow card) 29'; Ristovski 56'; Mlinarić 87'; Đorđević (yellow card) 90+6'	Report	Dimitrić (yellow card) 25'; Ćosić (yellow card) 34'; Čumić 67'; Gogić 72'; Tabaković 79'; Ghorzi 83'	Stadium: Asim Ferhatović Hase Stadium; Attendance: 2,000; Referee: Antoni Bandić (Grude)

9 August 2025 3	Sloga Doboj	2–1	Sarajevo	Doboj
17:00 CEST (UTC+2)	Jović 4', 45+5' (pen.); Varga (yellow card) 40'; Grabež (yellow card) 43'; Kunić (yellow card) 61'; Mandić (yellow card) 82'	Report	Jović (yellow card) 45'; Beganović (yellow card) 48'; Kyeremeh 67'	Stadium: Luke Stadium; Attendance: 1,500; Referee: Josip Martinović (Čapljina)

16 August 2025 4	Sarajevo	2–1	Posušje	Sarajevo
21:00 CEST (UTC+2)	Kyeremeh 21'; Krdžalić 61', (yellow card) 69'	Report	Živković 33'; Andačić (yellow card) 56'; Ćeman (yellow card) 58'	Stadium: Asim Ferhatović Hase Stadium; Attendance: 4,500; Referee: Aleksandar Njegomirović (Prnjavor)

24 August 2025 5	Borac Banja Luka	5–1	Sarajevo	Banja Luka
18:45 CEST (UTC+2)	Juričić 13', 83', (yellow card) 46'; Hrelja 22'; Vuković (penalty missed) 71', 71', 81'; Berbić (yellow card) 75'; Zorić (yellow card) 88'	Report	Mlinarić 19'; Kyeremeh (yellow card) 29'; Jatta (yellow card) 44' (yellow-red card) 64'	Stadium: Banja Luka City Stadium; Attendance: 6,500; Referee: Sabrija Topalović (Zenica)

29 August 2025 6	Sarajevo	1–0	Rudar Prijedor	Sarajevo
21:00 CEST (UTC+2)	Ljajić 55'; Jović (yellow card) 45+2'; Turda (yellow card) 90+5'; Oliveira (yellow card) 90+5'	Report	Keranović (yellow card) 42'; Đekić (yellow card) 62'	Stadium: Asim Ferhatović Hase Stadium; Attendance: 3,000; Referee: Mario Pejić (Grude)

10 September 2025 1 (Note: Match of Round 1 postponed because of Zrinjski's participation in the UEFA Champions League second qualifying round and Sarajevo's participation in the UEFA Conference League second qualifying round.)	Zrinjski Mostar	2–0	Sarajevo	Mostar
20:00 CEST (UTC+2)	Ćuže 10'; Šakota 54'; Mamić (yellow card) 60'; Savić (yellow card) 88'	Report	Jatta (yellow card) 33'	Stadium: Stadion pod Bijelim Brijegom; Attendance: 1,500; Referee: Luka Bilbija (Prijedor)

14 September 2025 7	Široki Brijeg	2–1	Sarajevo	Široki Brijeg
19:45 CEST (UTC+2)	Stanić 8' (pen.); Sesar 44'; Bajkuša (red card) 59'	Report	Jatta (yellow card) 7'; Bralić (yellow card) 43' (yellow-red card) 83'; Kuprešak 45+3'; Ljajić (yellow card) 58'; Ristovski (yellow card) 78'	Stadium: Stadion Pecara; Attendance: 2,200; Referee: Dražen Marić (Bijeljina)

20 September 2025 8	Sarajevo	2–0	Velež Mostar	Sarajevo
18:30 CEST (UTC+2)	Ljajić 4'; Jatta (yellow card) 8'; Mlinarić 48'; Kyeremeh (yellow card) 57'; Mamas (yellow card) 72'	Report	Abdullah (yellow card) 13'; Karjašević (yellow card) 15'	Stadium: Asim Ferhatović Hase Stadium; Attendance: 5,500; Referee: Antoni Bandić (Grude)

27 September 2025 9	Željezničar	2–0	Sarajevo	Sarajevo
18:30 CEST (UTC+2)	Erick 62'; Peixoto (yellow card) 76', (goal) 90+4'; Alić (yellow card) 77'; Rakić (yellow card) 80'; Troupée (yellow card) 83'; Abdulahović (yellow card) 86'	Report	Ristovski (yellow card) 40'; Guliashvili (yellow card) 41'; Oliveira (yellow card) 81'; Krdžalić (yellow card) 83'; Beganović (yellow card) 86'	Stadium: Stadion Grbavica; Attendance: 9,300; Referee: Nihad Ljajić (Sarajevo)

6 October 2025 10	Sarajevo	1–1	Zrinjski Mostar	Sarajevo
18:00 CEST (UTC+2)	Butić 62'; Krdžalić (yellow card) 78'	Report	Jakovljević (yellow card) 51'; Abramović (yellow card) 74'; Damașcan 90+2'; Filipović (yellow card) 90+4'	Stadium: Asim Ferhatović Hase Stadium; Attendance: 2,500; Referee: Luka Bilbija (Prijedor)

18 October 2025 11	Radnik Bijeljina	2–2	Sarajevo	Bijeljina
18:30 CEST (UTC+2)	Dimitrić (yellow card) 34'; Ghorzi 39'; Čumić 69' (pen.); Ćosić (yellow card) 90'; Krajišnik (yellow card) 90+1'; Markovina (yellow card) 90+4'	Report	Kuprešak 57'; Kyeremeh 71'	Stadium: Bijeljina City Stadium; Attendance: 2,000; Referee: Josip Martinović (Čapljina)

24 October 2025 12	Sarajevo	1–0	Sloga Doboj	Sarajevo
18:00 CEST (UTC+2)	Butić (penalty missed) 16'; Beganović (yellow card) 88'; Mujkić 89', (yellow card) 90'; Oliveira (yellow card) 90+1'	Report	Hasanović (yellow card) 7'; Mandić (yellow card) 66'; Mekić (yellow card) 82'	Stadium: Asim Ferhatović Hase Stadium; Attendance: 3,500; Referee: Frano Jelić (Široki Brijeg)

2 November 2025 13	Posušje	0–3	Sarajevo	Posušje
15:15 CET (UTC+1)	Lasić (red card) 9'; Kovač (yellow card) 19'	Report	Guliashvili 12' (pen.); Butić 39'; Mujkić 59'; Maroodza (yellow card) 68'; Đorđević (yellow card) 90+1'	Stadium: Mokri Dolac Stadium; Attendance: 2,800; Referee: Mirza Kazlagić (Cazin)

8 November 2025 14	Sarajevo	1–0	Borac Banja Luka	Sarajevo
18:30 CET (UTC+1)	Bralić 17'; Ignatkov (yellow card) 40'; Beganović (yellow card) 48'	Report	Jakšić (yellow card) 39'; Rogan (yellow card) 45'; Hiroš (yellow card) 90+5'	Stadium: Asim Ferhatović Hase Stadium; Attendance: 3,500; Referee: Haris Halkić (Sanski Most)

22 November 2025 15	Rudar Prijedor	2–1	Sarajevo	Prijedor
16:00 CET (UTC+1)	Keranović 71'; Ramić 76'	Report	Kyeremeh 20'; Oliveira (yellow card) 51'; Ristovski (yellow card) 73'	Stadium: Prijedor City Stadium; Attendance: 450; Referee: Josip Martinović (Čapljina)

29 November 2025 16	Sarajevo	0–0	Široki Brijeg	Sarajevo
16:00 CET (UTC+1)	Maroodza (yellow card) 80'	Report	Posavac (yellow card) 52'; Stanić (yellow card) 78'; Marić (red card) 80'	Stadium: Asim Ferhatović Hase Stadium; Attendance: 3,000; Referee: Aleksandar Njegomirović (Prnjavor)

2 December 2025 17	Velež Mostar	0–0	Sarajevo	Mostar
18:30 CET (UTC+1)	Hrkać (yellow card) 67'	Report	Maroodza (yellow card) 71'	Stadium: Stadion Rođeni; Attendance: 3,000; Referee: Dragan Petrović (Banja Luka)

7 December 2025 18	Sarajevo	4–0	Željezničar	Sarajevo
13:00 CET (UTC+1)	Elezi 14'; Oliveira 42', (yellow card) 47'; Ristovski (yellow card) 45+6'; Mujkić (yellow card) 45+7'; Ljajić 45+10'; Cimirot (yellow card) 55'; Guliashvili (yellow card) 74'; Mlinarić 87', (yellow card) 87'	Report	Troupée (yellow card) 45+7'; Muftić (yellow card) 45+7'	Stadium: Asim Ferhatović Hase Stadium; Attendance: 8,500; Referee: Irfan Peljto (Sarajevo)

14 December 2025 19	Zrinjski Mostar	0–1	Sarajevo	Mostar
17:30 CET (UTC+1)	Sušić (yellow card) 58'; Bilbija (yellow card) 68'; Memija (yellow card) 87'	Report	Turda (yellow card) 9'; Guliashvili (yellow card) 32'; Oliveira 36', (yellow card) 83'; Maroodza (yellow card) 65'; Ljajić (yellow card) 68'; Ristić (yellow card) 88'	Stadium: Stadion pod Bijelim Brijegom; Attendance: 5,000; Referee: Antoni Bandić (Grude)

6 February 2026 20	Sarajevo	2–0	Radnik Bijeljina	Sarajevo
20:00 CET (UTC+1)	Elezi 19'; Maroodza (yellow card) 59'; Ljajić (penalty missed) 82'; Menalo 85'	Report	Agyemang (yellow card) 56'; Radović (yellow card) 66'; Karjašević (yellow card) 74'; Hrvanović (yellow card) 77'; Markovina (yellow card) 90+2'	Stadium: Asim Ferhatović Hase Stadium; Attendance: 2,500; Referee: Frano Jelić (Široki Brijeg)

15 February 2026 21	Sloga Doboj	0–1	Sarajevo	Doboj
15:00 CET (UTC+1)	Zilčić (yellow card) 77'; Mandić (yellow card) 83'	Report	Beganović (yellow card) 40'; Ljajić (yellow card) 52'; Krdžalić 89'	Stadium: Luke Stadium; Attendance: 300; Referee: Mateo Musa (Čitluk)

21 February 2026 22	Sarajevo	3–0	Posušje	Sarajevo
18:30 CET (UTC+1)	Ristovski 14'; Mujkić (yellow card) 27'; Elezi 33'; Kuprešak 72'	Report		Stadium: Asim Ferhatović Hase Stadium; Attendance: 3,000; Referee: Dragan Petrović (Banja Luka)

28 February 2026 23	Borac Banja Luka	2–0	Sarajevo	Banja Luka
18:30 CET (UTC+1)	Hrelja 48', (yellow card) 55'; Perić 88'	Report	Maroodza (yellow card) 62'; Menalo (yellow card) 77'	Stadium: Banja Luka City Stadium; Attendance: 4,500; Referee: Armin Kukić (Bugojno)

7 March 2026 24	Sarajevo	2–2	Rudar Prijedor	Sarajevo
15:00 CET (UTC+1)	Ljajić 10' (pen.), (yellow card) 51'; Gojković (yellow card) 18'; Hujber (yellow card) 30' (yellow-red card) 50'; Ristovski (yellow card) 52'; Menalo 59'; Carlos (yellow card) 64'; Mujkić (yellow card) 78'	Report	Mohedano (penalty missed) 18'; Ramić (yellow card) 45+2'; Romera 74', 90+8' (pen.); Pekija (yellow card) 90+9'	Stadium: Asim Ferhatović Hase Stadium; Attendance: 3,500; Referee: Antoni Bandić (Grude)
Note: Sarajevo manager Mario Cvitanović was cautioned (yellow card) in the 52nd minute.

15 March 2026 25	Široki Brijeg	1–0	Sarajevo	Široki Brijeg
15:15 CET (UTC+1)	Stanić 55'	Report	Méité (yellow card) 70'; Carlos (yellow card) 71'	Stadium: Stadion Pecara; Referee: Dražen Marić (Bijeljina)

22 March 2026 26	Sarajevo	1–0	Velež Mostar	Sarajevo
19:45 CET (UTC+1)	Ristovski 63'; Gojković (yellow card) 85'	Report	Kuzmanović (yellow card) 45'; Pidro (yellow card) 51'; Spahić (yellow card) 85'; Nukić (yellow card) 85'; Đurić (yellow card) 90+4'	Stadium: Asim Ferhatović Hase Stadium; Attendance: 3,500; Referee: Luka Bilbija (Prijedor)
Note: Sarajevo goalkeeping coach Adi Adilović was cautioned (yellow card) in the 72nd minute.

4 April 2026 27	Željezničar	0–0	Sarajevo	Sarajevo
20:45 CEST (UTC+2)	Muftić (yellow card) 40'; Pejić (yellow card) 62'	Report	Carlos (yellow card) 40'; Ljajić (yellow card) 81'	Stadium: Stadion Grbavica; Attendance: 8,000; Referee: Admir Musić (Sarajevo)

11 April 2026 28	Sarajevo	2–1	Zrinjski Mostar	Sarajevo
18:30 CEST (UTC+2)	Bilbija 8' (o.g.); Živković 24'	Report	Ilić 14'; Abramović (yellow card) 41'; Nalić (yellow card) 83'	Stadium: Asim Ferhatović Hase Stadium; Attendance: 3,000; Referee: Miloš Gigović (Gradiška)

18 April 2026 29	Radnik Bijeljina	1–2	Sarajevo	Bijeljina
16:00 CEST (UTC+2)	Črnko (yellow card) 9'; Ghorzi 38'; Meyapya (red card) 33'; Radović (yellow card) 45+1'	Report	Elezi 45+1'; Ignatkov (yellow card) 45+3'; Ivanišević 53', (yellow card) 55'; Bralić (yellow card) 61'; Carlos (yellow card) 86'; Banić (yellow card) 89'; Ljajić (yellow card) 90+1'	Stadium: Bijeljina City Stadium; Attendance: 1,800; Referee: Josip Martinović (Čapljina)

22 April 2026 30	Sarajevo	4–0	Sloga Doboj	Sarajevo
18:00 CEST (UTC+2)	Elezi 37'; Carlos 53' (pen.), 67'; Kuprešak 58'	Report	Kunić (yellow card) 78'; Predragović (yellow card) 89'	Stadium: Asim Ferhatović Hase Stadium; Attendance: 1,000; Referee: Dragan Petrović (Banja Luka)

26 April 2026 31	Posušje	0–1	Sarajevo	Posušje
19:45 CEST (UTC+2)	Mulato (yellow card) 60'; Čuić (yellow card) 83'	Report	Ivanišević 49'; Telalović (yellow card) 53'; Mušija (yellow card) 85'	Stadium: Mokri Dolac Stadium; Attendance: 2,500; Referee: Dragan Todić (Doboj)

3 May 2026 32	Sarajevo	0–1	Borac Banja Luka	Sarajevo
19:30 CEST (UTC+2)	Elezi (yellow card) 45+2'; Carlos (red card) 70'; Kuprešak (yellow card) 84'	Report	Juričić 35' (pen.); Hiroš (yellow card) 45+2'; Pascual (yellow card) 72'; Jurkas (yellow card) 90+2'	Stadium: Asim Ferhatović Hase Stadium; Attendance: 3,700; Referee: Antonio Tomić (Kreševo)

9 May 2026 33	Rudar Prijedor	2–4	Sarajevo	Prijedor
18:30 CEST (UTC+2)	Grbić (yellow card) 10'; Romera 45'; Mohedano 87'	Report	Ivanišević (yellow card) 21'; Elezi 47', (yellow card) 90+1'; Beganović (yellow card) 48'; Méité (yellow card) 58'; Kuprešak 62' (pen.); Menalo (yellow card) 66'; Kyeremeh 71', 80'; Bralić (yellow card) 77'	Stadium: Prijedor City Stadium; Attendance: 1,800; Referee: Darko Gedžić (Brčko)
Note: Sarajevo manager Mario Cvitanović and technical staff manager Mustafa Beridan were cautioned (yellow card) in the 68th minute.

16 May 2026 34	Sarajevo	2–2	Široki Brijeg	Sarajevo
18:00 CEST (UTC+2)	Kuprešak 43'; Ljajić 89' (pen.); Elezi (yellow card) 90+2'	Report	Klepač 45'; Marcinho (yellow card) 56'; Stanić 69'; Bagarić (yellow card) 72'; Bašić (yellow card) 81'; Sesar (yellow card) 90+3'	Stadium: Asim Ferhatović Hase Stadium; Attendance: 2,000; Referee: Dragan Kesić (Gradiška)

21 May 2026 35	Velež Mostar	2–3	Sarajevo	Mostar
20:30 CEST (UTC+2)	Ribić (yellow card) 26'; Šerbečić (yellow card) 90+3'; Spahić 38'; Đurić 53'	Report	Krdžalić 48'; Ljajić 50', (yellow card) 72'; Menalo 67'	Stadium: Stadion Rođeni; Attendance: 1,800; Referee: Dražen Marić (Bijeljina)
Note: Sarajevo manager Mario Cvitanović was cautioned (yellow card) in the 86th minute.

25 May 2026 36	Sarajevo	1–0	Željezničar	Sarajevo
20:30 CEST (UTC+2)	Elezi 45+3'; Telalović (yellow card) 50'	Report	Krpić (yellow card) 21'; Alić (yellow card) 48'; Pejić (yellow card) 90+5'	Stadium: Asim Ferhatović Hase Stadium; Attendance: 9,000; Referee: Sabrija Topalović (Zenica)

=== Cup of Bosnia and Herzegovina ===
==== Round of 32 ====
28 October 2025	Radnik Hadžići	0–3	Sarajevo	Sarajevo
13:00 CET (UTC+1)		Report	Oliveira 3', 28'; Kuprešak 87'	Stadium: Asim Ferhatović Hase Stadium; Attendance: 1,000; Referee: Armin Šarić (Stolac)

==== Round of 16 ====
11 February 2026	Čelik Zenica	0–1	Sarajevo	Zenica
18:00 CET (UTC+1)	Horić (yellow card) 83'	Report	Ljajić 80' (pen.); Maroodza (yellow card) 83'; Kuprešak (yellow card) 85'	Stadium: Bilino Polje Stadium; Attendance: 12,000; Referee: Haris Halkić (Sanski Most)

==== Quarter-finals ====
25 February 2026 First leg	Sarajevo	0–1	Velež Mostar	Sarajevo
18:30 CET (UTC+1)		Report	Spahić (yellow card) 32', (goal) 70'	Stadium: Asim Ferhatović Hase Stadium; Attendance: 4,500; Referee: Ermin Sivac (Zenica)

11 March 2026 Second leg	Velež Mostar	4–1 (5–1 agg.)	Sarajevo	Mostar
18:45 CET (UTC+1)	Spahić 33'; Nukić 38', (yellow card) 65'; Milak 60'; Salčin (yellow card) 65'; Hrkać 71'; Šerbečić (yellow card) 72'; Pidro (yellow card) 79'	Report	Carlos 13'; Méité (yellow card) 29'; Kuprešak (yellow card) 37'	Stadium: Stadion Rođeni; Attendance: 3,500; Referee: Dragan Petrović (Banja Luka)

=== Supercup of Bosnia and Herzegovina ===
18 March 2026	Zrinjski	0–0 (4–1 p)	Sarajevo	Mostar
18:30 CET (UTC+1)	Lagumdžija (yellow card) 39'; Jakovljević (yellow card) 56'	Report	Gojković (yellow card) 42'; Menalo (yellow card) 54'; Mujkić (yellow card) 64'	Stadium: Stadion pod Bijelim Brijegom; Referee: Dragan Petrović (Banja Luka)
	Penalties
	Bilbija (penalty scored); Ilić (penalty scored); Mamić (penalty scored); Lagumdžija (penalty scored)		(penalty scored) Ristovski; (penalty missed) Bralić; (penalty missed) Menalo

=== UEFA Conference League ===
==== Second qualifying round ====
24 July 2025 First Leg	Sarajevo (Bosnia and Herzegovina)	2–1	(Romania) Universitatea Craiova	Sarajevo, Bosnia and Herzegovina
21:00 CEST (UTC+2)	Kyeremeh 10'; Guliashvili 20'	Report	Romanchuk 69'	Stadium: Asim Ferhatović Hase Stadium; Attendance: 20,897; Referee: Dmytro Panchyshyn (Ukraine)

31 July 2025 Second Leg	Universitatea Craiova (Romania)	4–0 (5–2 agg.)	(Bosnia and Herzegovina) Sarajevo	Craiova, Romania
20:30 EEST (UTC+3)	Teles (yellow card) 33'; Al Hamlawi 51', 79', 83'; Cicâldău 68'; Isenko (yellow card) 86'; Houri (yellow card) 90+2'	Report	Jatta (yellow card) 24'; Kyeremeh (yellow card) 47'; Beganović (yellow card) 52'; Bralić (yellow card) 75'; Turda (yellow card) 79'; Guliashvili (yellow card) 84'	Stadium: Ion Oblemenco Stadium; Attendance: 19,640; Referee: Daniyar Sakhi (Kazakhstan)

== Statistics ==
=== Appearances and goals ===
No.	Pos	Nat	Player	Total		Bosnian Premier League		Bosnian Cup		Bosnian Supercup		Conference League	
No.	Pos	Nat	Player	Apps	Goals	Apps	Goals	Apps	Goals	Apps	Goals	Apps	Goals
Goalkeepers
13	GK	(Bosnia and Herzegovina) BIH	Sanin Mušija	12	0	11	0	1	0	0	0	0	0
31	GK	(Croatia) CRO	Ivan Banić	31	0	25	0	3	0	1	0	2	0
40	GK	(Bosnia and Herzegovina) BIH	Faris Mehić	0	0	0	0	0	0	0	0	0	0
45	GK	(Bosnia and Herzegovina) BIH	Ibrahim Zahirović	0	0	0	0	0	0	0	0	0	0
Defenders
2	DF	(Zimbabwe) ZIM	Shane Maroodza	22	0	15+4	0	1+1	0	0+1	0	0	0
3	DF	(Bosnia and Herzegovina) BIH	Renato Gojković	12	0	5+3	0	3	0	1	0	0	0
4	DF	(Bosnia and Herzegovina) BIH	Nermin Mujkić	26	2	20+2	2	2+1	0	1	0	0	0
6	DF	(Canada) CAN	Jovan Ivanišević	12	2	9+2	2	1	0	0	0	0	0
17	DF	(Bosnia and Herzegovina) BIH	Hamza Redžić	0	0	0	0	0	0	0	0	0	0
22	DF	(Bosnia and Herzegovina) BIH	Amar Beganović	35	0	21+7	0	1+3	0	1	0	2	0
26	DF	(Bosnia and Herzegovina) BIH	Daris Dizdarević	6	0	0+5	0	0+1	0	0	0	0	0
27	DF	(Croatia) CRO	Luka Hujber	8	0	5+1	0	1+1	0	0	0	0	0
28	DF	(Croatia) CRO	Slavko Bralić	32	1	27+2	1	0+1	0	1	0	0+1	0
33	DF	(North Macedonia) MKD	Stefan Ristovski	34	3	27+1	3	3	0	1	0	2	0
38	DF	(Ivory Coast) CIV	Souleymane Méité	7	0	3+3	0	1	0	0	0	0	0
77	DF	(Croatia) CRO	Mihael Kuprešak	39	7	22+11	6	3+1	1	0	0	2	0
Midfielders
5	MF	(Bosnia and Herzegovina) BIH	Rijad Telalović	12	0	3+7	0	0+2	0	0	0	0	0
20	MF	(North Macedonia) MKD	Agon Elezi	32	9	23+3	9	3	0	1	0	0+2	0
23	MF	(Bosnia and Herzegovina) BIH	Anes Krdžalić	23	3	14+5	3	2+1	0	1	0	0	0
27	MF	(Bosnia and Herzegovina) BIH	Muamer Hamzić	2	0	0+2	0	0	0	0	0	0	0
29/35	MF	(Bosnia and Herzegovina) BIH	Amar Cerić	0	0	0	0	0	0	0	0	0	0
30	MF	(Bosnia and Herzegovina) BIH	Ante Pokrajčić	0	0	0	0	0	0	0	0	0	0
35	MF	(Ukraine) UKR	Serhiy Ihnatkov	24	0	13+9	0	1+1	0	0	0	0	0
55	MF	(Bosnia and Herzegovina) BIH	Kenan Vrban	2	0	0+2	0	0	0	0	0	0	0
59	MF	(Bosnia and Herzegovina) BIH	Gojko Cimirot	29	0	18+8	0	2	0	1	0	0	0
66	MF	(Cyprus) CYP	Rafail Mamas	8	0	4+4	0	0	0	0	0	0	0
88	MF	(Serbia) SRB	Adem Ljajić	28	7	19+6	6	2	1	1	0	0	0
Forwards
7	FW	(Bosnia and Herzegovina) BIH	Luka Menalo	21	3	12+5	3	3	0	0+1	0	0	0
9	FW	(Bosnia and Herzegovina) BIH	Aldin Turkeš	12	0	2+6	0	0+3	0	0	0	0+1	0
10	FW	(Brazil) BRA	Renan Oliveira	17	4	4+10	2	1	2	0	0	2	0
11	FW	(Ghana) GHA	Francis Kyeremeh	33	7	20+8	6	2	0	0+1	0	2	1
21	FW	(Bosnia and Herzegovina) BIH	Anes H. Mehmedović	1	0	0+1	0	0	0	0	0	0	0
24	FW	(Croatia) CRO	Filip Živković	8	1	2+6	1	0	0	0	0	0	0
99	FW	(Brazil) BRA	João Carlos	13	3	11	2	1	1	1	0	0	0
Players transferred out during the season
5	DF	(Romania) ROU	Grigore Turda	10	0	2+5	0	1	0	0	0	2	0
7	FW	(Georgia (country)) GEO	Giorgi Guliashvili	20	2	18	1	0	0	0	0	2	1
8	FW	(Croatia) CRO	Mihael Mlinarić	22	4	16+3	4	1	0	0	0	2	0
14	MF	(Serbia) SRB	Aleksandar Đorđević	16	0	2+11	0	1	0	0	0	0+2	0
16	DF	(Serbia) SRB	Filip Jović	12	0	6+3	0	1	0	0	0	2	0
17	FW	(Croatia) CRO	Karlo Butić	12	2	6+6	2	0	0	0	0	0	0
18	MF	(Croatia) CRO	Edin Julardžija	3	0	0+2	0	1	0	0	0	0	0
19	FW	(Serbia) SRB	Andreja Ristić	5	0	0+4	0	0+1	0	0	0	0	0
21	MF	(The Gambia) GAM	Momodou Jatta	8	0	6	0	0	0	0	0	2	0
24	FW	(Sweden) SWE	Anomnachi Chidi	2	0	0+1	0	1	0	0	0	0	0
25	DF	(Bosnia and Herzegovina) BIH	Tarik Kapetanović	2	0	2	0	0	0	0	0	0	0
30	MF	(Bosnia and Herzegovina) BIH	Bakir Nurković	1	0	0+1	0	0	0	0	0	0	0
42	GK	(Serbia) SRB	Emil Rockov	0	0	0	0	0	0	0	0	0	0
44	DF	(Bulgaria) BUL	Martin Paskalev	6	0	3+1	0	1	0	0	0	0+1	0

Number after the "+" sign represents the number of games player started the game on the bench and was substituted on.

=== Goalscorers ===
Rank	No.	Pos.	Nat.	Player	Bosnian Premier League	Bosnian Cup	Bosnian Supercup	Conference League	Total
1	20	MF	(North Macedonia)	Agon Elezi	9	0	0	0	9
2	11	FW	(Ghana)	Francis Kyeremeh	6	0	0	1	7
2	77	DF	(Croatia)	Mihael Kuprešak	6	1	0	0	7
2	88	MF	(Serbia)	Adem Ljajić	6	1	0	0	7
5	8	FW	(Croatia)	Mihael Mlinarić	4	0	0	0	4
5	10	FW	(Brazil)	Renan Oliveira	2	2	0	0	4
7	7	FW	(Bosnia and Herzegovina)	Luka Menalo	3	0	0	0	3
7	23	MF	(Bosnia and Herzegovina)	Anes Krdžalić	3	0	0	0	3
7	33	DF	(North Macedonia)	Stefan Ristovski	3	0	0	0	3
7	99	FW	(Brazil)	João Carlos	2	1	0	0	3
11	4	DF	(Bosnia and Herzegovina)	Nermin Mujkić	2	0	0	0	2
11	6	DF	(Canada)	Jovan Ivanišević	2	0	0	0	2
11	7	FW	(Georgia (country))	Giorgi Guliashvili	1	0	0	1	2
11	17	FW	(Croatia)	Karlo Butić	2	0	0	0	2
15	24	FW	(Croatia)	Filip Živković	1	0	0	0	1
15	28	DF	(Croatia)	Slavko Bralić	1	0	0	0	1
Own goals					1	0	0	0	1
Total					54	5	0	2	61

=== Assists ===
Rank	No.	Pos.	Nat.	Player	Bosnian Premier League	Bosnian Cup	Bosnian Supercup	Conference League	Total
1	7	FW	(Georgia (country))	Giorgi Guliashvili	8	0	0	0	8
2	77	DF	(Croatia)	Mihael Kuprešak	6	0	0	0	6
3	88	MF	(Serbia)	Adem Ljajić	5	0	0	0	5
4	22	DF	(Bosnia and Herzegovina)	Amar Beganović	4	0	0	0	4
5	7	FW	(Bosnia and Herzegovina)	Luka Menalo	2	1	0	0	3
5	8	FW	(Croatia)	Mihael Mlinarić	2	0	0	1	3
5	11	FW	(Ghana)	Francis Kyeremeh	3	0	0	0	3
5	99	FW	(Brazil)	João Carlos	3	0	0	0	3
9	59	MF	(Bosnia and Herzegovina)	Gojko Cimirot	2	0	0	0	2
10	2	DF	(Zimbabwe)	Shane Maroodza	0	1	0	0	1
10	3	DF	(Bosnia and Herzegovina)	Renato Gojković	1	0	0	0	1
10	5	MF	(Bosnia and Herzegovina)	Rijad Telalović	1	0	0	0	1
10	9	FW	(Bosnia and Herzegovina)	Aldin Turkeš	1	0	0	0	1
10	10	FW	(Brazil)	Renan Oliveira	0	0	0	1	1
10	16	DF	(Serbia)	Filip Jović	0	1	0	0	1
10	17	FW	(Croatia)	Karlo Butić	1	0	0	0	1
10	24	FW	(Sweden)	Anomnachi Chidi	0	1	0	0	1
10	24	FW	(Croatia)	Filip Živković	1	0	0	0	1
10	33	DF	(North Macedonia)	Stefan Ristovski	1	0	0	0	1
Total					41	4	0	2	47

=== Clean sheets ===
Rank	No.	Nat.	Player	Bosnian Premier League	Bosnian Cup	Bosnian Supercup	Conference League	Total
1	31	(Croatia)	Ivan Banić	14	1	1	0	16
2	13	(Bosnia and Herzegovina)	Sanin Mušija	3	1	0	0	4
Total				17	2	1	0	20

=== Disciplinary record ===
N	P	Nat.	Name	Bosnian Premier League			Bosnian Cup			Bosnian Supercup			Conference League			Total			Notes
N	P	Nat.	Name	Yellow card	Second yellow card	Red card	Yellow card	Second yellow card	Red card	Yellow card	Second yellow card	Red card	Yellow card	Second yellow card	Red card	Yellow card	Second yellow card	Red card	Notes
2	DF	(Zimbabwe)	Shane Maroodza	6			1									7			
3	DF	(Bosnia and Herzegovina)	Renato Gojković	2						1						3			
4	DF	(Bosnia and Herzegovina)	Nermin Mujkić	4						1						5			
5	MF	(Bosnia and Herzegovina)	Rijad Telalović	2												2			
5	DF	(Romania)	Grigore Turda	2									1			3			
6	DF	(Canada)	Jovan Ivanišević	2												2			
7	FW	(Georgia (country))	Giorgi Guliashvili	3									1			4			
7	FW	(Bosnia and Herzegovina)	Luka Menalo	2						1						3			
8	FW	(Croatia)	Mihael Mlinarić	1												1			
10	FW	(Brazil)	Renan Oliveira	6												6			
11	FW	(Ghana)	Francis Kyeremeh	2									1			3			
13	GK	(Bosnia and Herzegovina)	Sanin Mušija	1												1			
14	MF	(Serbia)	Aleksandar Đorđević	2												2			
16	DF	(Serbia)	Filip Jović	2												2			
19	FW	(Serbia)	Andreja Ristić	1												1			
20	MF	(North Macedonia)	Agon Elezi	3												3			
21	MF	(The Gambia)	Momodou Jatta	3	1								1			4	1		
22	DF	(Bosnia and Herzegovina)	Amar Beganović	6									1			7			
23	MF	(Bosnia and Herzegovina)	Anes Krdžalić	3												3			
27	DF	(Croatia)	Luka Hujber		1												1		
28	DF	(Croatia)	Slavko Bralić	2	1								1			3	1		
31	GK	(Croatia)	Ivan Banić	1												1			
33	DF	(North Macedonia)	Stefan Ristovski	5												5			
35	MF	(Ukraine)	Serhiy Ihnatkov	2												2			
38	DF	(Ivory Coast)	Souleymane Méité	2			1									3			
44	DF	(Bulgaria)	Martin Paskalev	1												1			
59	MF	(Bosnia and Herzegovina)	Gojko Cimirot	1												1			
66	MF	(Cyprus)	Rafail Mamas	1												1			
77	DF	(Croatia)	Mihael Kuprešak	1			2									3			
88	MF	(Serbia)	Adem Ljajić	7												7			
99	FW	(Brazil)	João Carlos	4		1										4		1	
		(Croatia)	Mario Cvitanović	3												3			Manager
		(Bosnia and Herzegovina)	Adi Adilović	1												1			Goalkeeping coach
		(Bosnia and Herzegovina)	Mustafa Beridan	1												1			Technical staff manager

Source: Competitive matches
Ordered by (red card) , (second yellow card) and (yellow card)
(yellow card) = Number of bookings; (second yellow card) = Number of sending offs after a second yellow card; (red card) = Number of sending offs by a direct red card.

=== Games as captain ===
Rank	No.	Pos.	Nat.	Player	Bosnian Premier League	Bosnian Cup	Bosnian Supercup	Conference League	Total
1	7	FW	(Georgia (country))	Giorgi Guliashvili	18	0	0	2	20
2	88	MF	(Serbia)	Adem Ljajić	10	2	1	0	13
3	59	MF	(Bosnia and Herzegovina)	Gojko Cimirot	6	0	0	0	6
4	3	DF	(Bosnia and Herzegovina)	Renato Gojković	1	1	0	0	2
5	4	DF	(Bosnia and Herzegovina)	Nermin Mujkić	0	1	0	0	1
5	22	DF	(Bosnia and Herzegovina)	Amar Beganović	1	0	0	0	1
Total					36	4	1	2	43
