= List of Croatian football transfers winter 2023–24 =

This is a list of Croatian football transfers for the 2023–24 winter transfer window. Only transfers featuring Croatian Football League are listed.

== Croatian Football League ==
Note: Flags indicate national team as has been defined under FIFA eligibility rules. Players may hold more than one non-FIFA nationality.

=== Dinamo Zagreb ===
In:

No.	Pos.	Nation	Player
3	DF	JPN	Takuya Ogiwara (on loan from (Japan) Urawa Red Diamonds)
14	MF	CRO	Marko Rog (on loan from (Italy) Cagliari)
18	DF	FRA	Ronaël Pierre-Gabriel (from (France) Nantes)
20	FW	KOS	Arbër Hoxha (from Slaven Belupo)

Out:

No.	Pos.	Nation	Player
3	DF	URU	Joaquín Sosa (loan return to (Italy) Bologna)
14	MF	AUT	Robert Ljubičić (to (Greece) AEK Athens)
15	DF	UKR	Bohdan Mykhaylichenko (to (Ukraine) Polissya Zhytomyr)
20	FW	CRO	Antonio Marin (to (Slovenia) Olimpija Ljubljana)
41	FW	CRO	Gabrijel Rukavina (on loan to Gorica)
70	FW	BIH	Luka Menalo (on loan to (Slovenia) Celje)
97	FW	AUS	Deni Jurić (on loan to (Slovenia) Koper)
—	DF	CRO	Borna Graonić (on loan to Dugopolje)
—	DF	CRO	Filip Brekalo (on loan to (Bosnia and Herzegovina) Zrinjski Mostar, previously on loan at Dugopolje)
—	GK	CRO	Ivan Mandić (to Vukovar 1991, previously on loan)
—	MF	BIH	Anes Krdžalić (to (Bosnia and Herzegovina) Sarajevo, previously on loan at Lokomotiva)

=== Hajduk Split ===
In:

No.	Pos.	Nation	Player
4	DF	CRO	Ivan Perišić (on loan from (England) Tottenham Hotspur)
9	FW	CRO	Nikola Kalinić (free agent)
30	MF	HUN	László Kleinheisler (on loan from (Greece) Panathinaikos)
70	FW	CRO	Josip Brekalo (on loan from (Italy) Fiorentina)

Out:

No.	Pos.	Nation	Player
26	FW	CRO	Ivan Dolček (to (Slovakia) Dunajská Streda)
33	DF	KOS	Elvis Letaj (on loan to (Slovenia) Radomlje)
36	MF	CRO	Tino Blaž Lauš (on loan to (Slovenia) Koper)
44	DF	CRO	Luka Vušković (on loan to (Poland) Radomiak Radom)
—	GK	CRO	Karlo Sentić (on loan to (Kazakhstan) Ordabasy, previously on loan at (Hungary) Diósgyőr)

=== Osijek ===
In:

No.	Pos.	Nation	Player
5	DF	ARM	Styopa Mkrtchyan (from Ararat-Armenia, previously on loan)
18	MF	ALB	Enis Çokaj (on loan from (Greece) Panathinaikos)
22	DF	CRO	Roko Jurišić (from (Slovenia) Mura)
99	FW	SVK	Ladislav Almási (on loan from (Czech Republic) Baník Ostrava)

Out:

No.	Pos.	Nation	Player
1	GK	CRO	Tin Sajko (on loan to Jarun)
4	DF	MKD	Jovan Manev (loan return to (Turkey) Adana Demirspor)
11	MF	CRO	Mijo Caktaš (to (Turkey) Sivasspor)
14	MF	CRO	Ivan Fiolić (to (China) Tianjin Jinmen Tiger)
19	MF	UKR	Denys Harmash (to (Ukraine) Metalist 1925 Kharkiv)
79	FW	BIH	Amer Hiroš (to (Bosnia and Herzegovina) Željezničar)
—	FW	CRO	Ivan Baković (on loan to Vukovar 1991, previously on loan at Bijelo Brdo)
—	FW	MNE	Nikola Janjić (on loan to (Slovakia) Komárno, previously on loan at (Slovenia) Bravo)

=== Rijeka ===
In:

No.	Pos.	Nation	Player
24	FW	CRO	Mirko Marić (on loan from (Italy) Monza)

Out:

No.	Pos.	Nation	Player
27	MF	BIH	Silvio Ilinković (on loan to (Bosnia and Herzegovina) Zrinjski Mostar)
48	DF	CRO	Tino Agić (on loan to Cibalia)

=== Istra 1961 ===
In:

No.	Pos.	Nation	Player
5	DF	FIN	Ville Koski (from (Finland) Honka)
9	FW	BIH	Hamza Jaganjac (on loan from (Turkey) Adana Demirspor)

Out:

No.	Pos.	Nation	Player

=== Varaždin ===
In:

No.	Pos.	Nation	Player

Out:

No.	Pos.	Nation	Player

=== Lokomotiva ===
In:

No.	Pos.	Nation	Player

Out:

No.	Pos.	Nation	Player
24	MF	BIH	Anes Krdžalić (loan return to Dinamo Zagreb)

=== Slaven Belupo ===
In:

No.	Pos.	Nation	Player

Out:

No.	Pos.	Nation	Player
9	FW	KOS	Arbër Hoxha (to Dinamo Zagreb)

=== Gorica ===
In:

No.	Pos.	Nation	Player
41	FW	CRO	Gabrijel Rukavina (on loan from Dinamo Zagreb)

Out:

No.	Pos.	Nation	Player

=== Rudeš ===
In:

No.	Pos.	Nation	Player

Out:

No.	Pos.	Nation	Player

== See also ==
- 2023–24 Croatian Football League
