= Adi Nalić =

Bosnian footballer (born 1997)

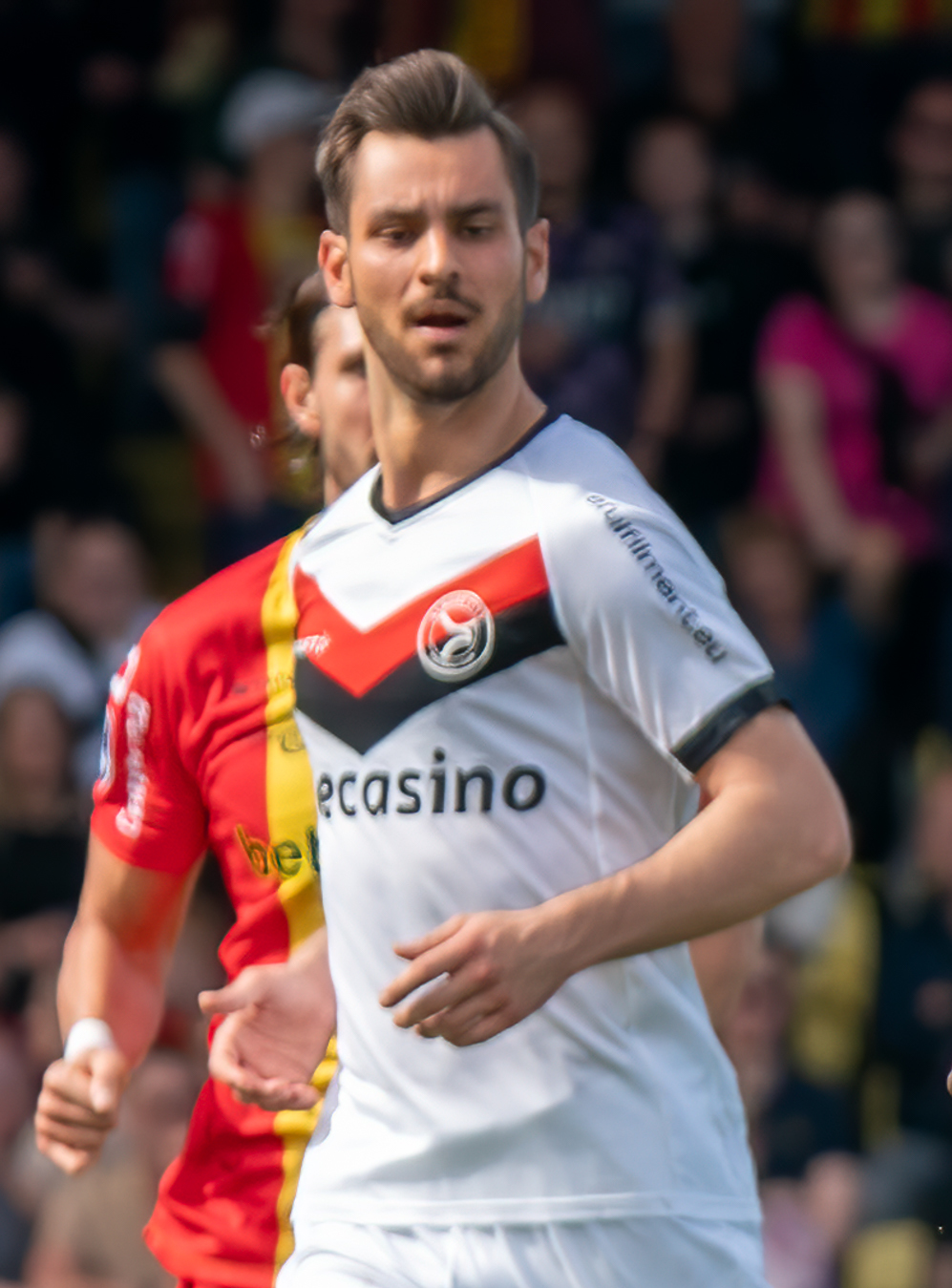
- Nalić with Almere City in 2024

Personal information
- Date of birth: 1 December 1997 (age 28)
- Place of birth: Sölvesborg, Sweden
- Height: 1.90 m (6 ft 3 in)
- Positions: Attacking midfielder; forward

Team information
- Current team: CFR Cluj
- Number: 7

Youth career
- Sölvesborg GoIF
- –2016: Mjällby AIF

Senior career*
Years	Team	Apps	(Gls)
2016–2017	Mjällby AIF	5	(0)
2017–2018	Landskrona BoIS	50	(8)
2018–2022	Malmö FF	53	(8)
2019	→ AFC Eskilstuna (loan)	20	(5)
2023	Hammarby IF	26	(4)
2024–2025	Almere City	29	(2)
2026	Zrinjski Mostar	14	(2)
2026–	CFR Cluj	7	(0)

International career
2021–2023	Bosnia and Herzegovina	9	(0)
- * Club domestic league appearances and goals as of 31 October 2026

Adi Nalić (pronounced [ǎdi nâːlitɕ]; born 1 December 1997) is a professional footballer who plays as an attacking midfielder or a forward for Liga I club CFR Cluj. Born in Sweden, he played for the Bosnia and Herzegovina national team.

Nalić started his professional career at Mjällby AIF, before joining Landskrona BoIS in 2017. In 2019, he moved to Malmö FF, who loaned him to AFC Eskilstuna later that year. Four years later, he switched to Hammarby IF. In 2024, he signed with Almere City. Two years later, he joined Zrinjski Mostar.

Nalić made his senior international debut for Bosnia and Herzegovina in 2021, earning 9 caps until 2023.

== Club career ==
=== Early career ===
Nalić came through Mjällby AIF's youth setup. He made his professional debut against Tvååkers IF on 11 September 2016 at the age of 18.

In December, he joined Landskrona BoIS. On 19 February, he scored his first professional goal against Gefle IF, which sent his club through in their cup tie.

=== Malmö FF ===
In November 2018, Nalić signed a four-year contract with Malmö FF.

In March 2019, he was sent on a season-long loan to AFC Eskilstuna.

He made his official debut for Malmö FF in a Svenska Cupen game against Syrianska FC on 15 February 2020 and managed to score a goal. Four months later, he made his league debut against Mjällby AIF. On 12 August, he scored his first league goal against Örebro SK, which secured the victory for his team. He won his first trophy with the club on 8 November, when they were crowned league champions.

Nalić debuted in the UEFA Champions League against Juventus on 14 September 2021.

In April 2022, he suffered a severe knee injury, which was diagnosed as an anterior cruciate ligament tear and was ruled out for at least six months.

=== Hammarby IF ===
In January 2023, Nalić moved to Hammarby IF on a two-year deal. He made his competitive debut for the side on 9 April against BK Häcken. On 30 April, he scored his first goal for Hammarby IF against Malmö FF.

=== Almere City ===
In January 2024, Nalić joined Dutch outfit Almere City on a contract until June 2026. He debuted officially for the squad against Feyenoord on 25 February. On 31 March, he scored his first goal for Almere City against Volendam.

=== Later stage of career ===
In January 2026, Nalić signed with Zrinjski Mostar.

== International career ==
In May 2021, Nalić received his first senior call up to Bosnia and Herzegovina, for friendly games against Montenegro and Denmark. He debuted against the former on 2 June.

== Personal life ==
Nalić's father Zlatan was also a professional footballer, as well as his grandfather Mesud.

== Career statistics ==
=== Club ===
As of match played 31 October 2026

Appearances and goals by club, season and competition
Club	Season	League			National cup (Note: Includes Svenska Cupen, KNVB Cup, Bosnian Cup, Cupa României)		Continental		Other		Total	
Club	Season	Division	Apps	Goals	Apps	Goals	Apps	Goals	Apps	Goals	Apps	Goals
Mjällby AIF	2016	Ettan Södra	5	0	–		–		–		5	0
Landskrona BoIS	2017	Ettan Södra	23	3	3	2	–		–		26	5
Landskrona BoIS	2018	Superettan	27	5	1	1	–		–		28	6
Landskrona BoIS	Total		50	8	4	3	–		–		54	11
Malmö FF	2019	Allsvenskan	–		1	0	0	0	–		1	0
Malmö FF	2020	Allsvenskan	20	2	2	1	5 (Note: Appearances in UEFA Europa League)	1	–		29	4
Malmö FF	2021	Allsvenskan	29	6	2	0	10 (Note: Appearances in UEFA Champions League)	0	–		41	6
Malmö FF	2022	Allsvenskan	4	0	2	1	0	0	–		6	1
Malmö FF	Total		53	8	7	2	15	1	–		75	11
AFC Eskilstuna (loan)	2019	Allsvenskan	20	5	1	1	–		–		21	6
Hammarby IF	2023	Allsvenskan	26	4	0	0	2 (Note: Appearances in UEFA Conference League)	0	–		28	4
Almere City	2023–24	Eredivisie	7	1	–		–		–		7	1
Almere City	2024–25	Eredivisie	22	1	1	0	–		–		23	1
Almere City	Total		29	2	1	0	–		–		30	2
Zrinjski Mostar	2025–26	Bosnian Premier League	14	2	4	2	0	0	1 (Note: Appearance in Bosnian Supercup)	0	19	4
Zrinjski Mostar	2026–27	Bosnian Premier League	0	0	–		1	0	–		1	0
Zrinjski Mostar	Total		14	2	4	2	1	0	1	0	20	4
CFR Cluj	2026–27	Liga I	7	0	1	0	–		–		8	0
Career total			204	29	18	8	18	1	1	0	241	38

=== International ===
Appearances and goals by national team and year
National team	Year	Apps	Goals
Bosnia and Herzegovina
Bosnia and Herzegovina	2021	7	0
Bosnia and Herzegovina	2022	1	0
Bosnia and Herzegovina	2023	1	0
Total		9	0

== Honours ==
Landskrona BoIS

- Ettan Södra: 2017

Malmö FF

- Allsvenskan: 2020, 2021
- Svenska Cupen: 2021–22

Zrinjski Mostar

- Bosnian Cup: 2025–26
- Bosnian Supercup: 2025
