= Igor Savić (footballer, born 2000) =

Bosnian footballer

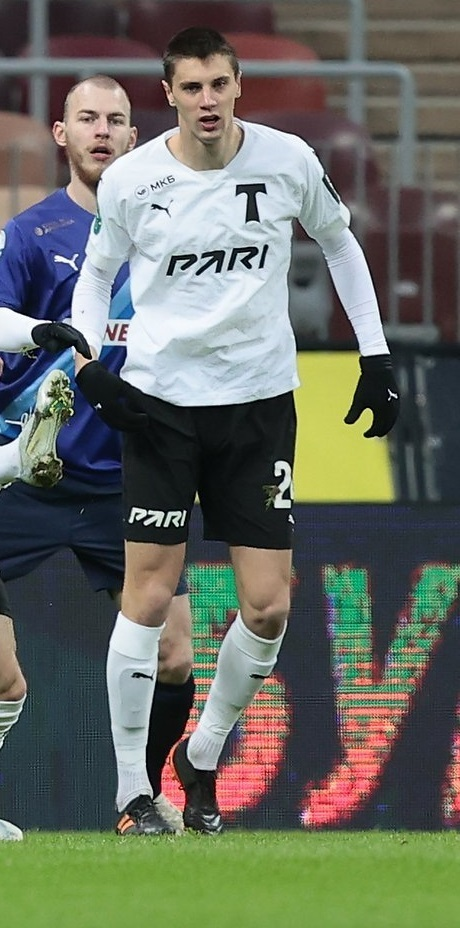
- Savić with Torpedo Moscow in 2022

Personal information
- Date of birth: 8 October 2000 (age 26)
- Place of birth: Trebinje, Bosnia and Herzegovina
- Height: 1.95 m (6 ft 5 in)
- Positions: Defensive midfielder; centre-back

Team information
- Current team: Zrinjski Mostar
- Number: 6

Youth career
- NK Mostar
- –2019: Zrinjski Mostar

Senior career*
Years	Team	Apps	(Gls)
2019–2022	Zrinjski Mostar	38	(6)
2019–2021	→ GOŠK Gabela (loan)	42	(8)
2022–2023	Torpedo Moscow	15	(0)
2023–2024	Zulte Waregem	6	(0)
2024–2026	Zrinjski Mostar	64	(2)
2026	CFR Cluj	0	(0)
2026–	Zrinjski Mostar	8	(0)

International career
2016	Bosnia and Herzegovina U17	4	(0)
2018	Bosnia and Herzegovina U18	2	(0)
2018	Bosnia and Herzegovina U19	7	(0)
2021–2022	Bosnia and Herzegovina U21	10	(0)
2021	Bosnia and Herzegovina	1	(0)
- * Club domestic league appearances and goals as of 19 September 2026

Igor Savić (Serbian Cyrillic: Игор Савић; born 8 October 2000) is a Bosnian professional footballer who plays as a defensive midfielder or a centre-back for Bosnian Premier League club Zrinjski Mostar.

== Career ==
Savić made his Bosnian Premier League debut for Zrinjski Mostar on 7 April 2019 in a game against Krupa.

On 8 September 2022, Savić signed with Torpedo Moscow in the Russian Premier League.

On 26 July 2023, Savić signed with Belgian side Zulte Waregem.

== Career statistics ==
=== Club ===
As of 19 September 2026

Appearances and goals by club, season and competition
Club	Season	League			National cup (Note: Includes Bosnian Cup, Russian Cup, Belgian Cup)		Continental		Other		Total	
Club	Season	Division	Apps	Goals	Apps	Goals	Apps	Goals	Apps	Goals	Apps	Goals
Zrinjski Mostar	2018–19	Bosnian Premier League	2	0	0	0	–		–		2	0
Zrinjski Mostar	2021–22	Bosnian Premier League	32	4	2	0	–		–		34	4
Zrinjski Mostar	2022–23	Bosnian Premier League	4	2	–		8 (Note: Two appearances in UEFA Champions League, six appearances and one goal in UEFA Conference League)	1	–		12	3
Zrinjski Mostar	Total		38	6	2	0	8	1	–		48	7
GOŠK Gabela (loan)	2019–20	First League of FBiH	15	3	4	0	–		19	3		
GOŠK Gabela (loan)	2020–21	First League of FBiH	27	5	1	0	–		–		28	5
GOŠK Gabela (loan)	Total		42	8	5	0	–		–		47	8
Torpedo Moscow	2022–23	Russian Premier League	15	0	4	0	–		–		19	0
Torpedo Moscow	2023–24	Russian First League	0	0	–		–		–		0	0
Torpedo Moscow	Total		15	0	4	0	–		–		19	0
Zulte Waregem	2023–24	Challenger Pro League	6	0	1	0	–		–		7	0
Zrinjski Mostar	2023–24	Bosnian Premier League	11	0	4	1	–		–		15	1
Zrinjski Mostar	2024–25	Bosnian Premier League	24	1	4	0	4 (Note: Appearances in UEFA Conference League)	0	1 (Note: Appearance in Bosnian Supercup)	0	33	1
Zrinjski Mostar	2025–26	Bosnian Premier League	29	1	1	0	8 (Note: Four appearances in UEFA Champions League, four appearances in UEFA Europa League)	0	1	0	39	1
Zrinjski Mostar	Total		64	2	9	1	12	0	2	0	87	3
CFR Cluj	2026–27	Liga I	0	0	0	0	0	0	–		0	0
Zrinjski Mostar	2026–27	Bosnian Premier League	8	0	0	0	–		0	0	8	0
Career total			173	14	21	1	20	1	2	0	216	16

=== International ===
Appearances and goals by national team and year
National team	Year	Apps	Goals
Bosnia and Herzegovina
Bosnia and Herzegovina	2021	1	0
Total		1	0

== Honours ==
Zrinjski Mostar

- Bosnian Premier League: 2021–22, 2024–25
- Bosnian Cup: 2023–24, 2025–26
- Bosnian Supercup: 2024, 2025
