= Mihael Mlinarić =

Croatian footballer

Personal information
- Date of birth: 16 June 2000 (age 26)
- Place of birth: Koprivnica, Croatia
- Height: 1.81 m (5 ft 11 in)
- Position: Forward

Team information
- Current team: Zagłębie Lubin
- Number: 88

Youth career
- –2019: Slaven Belupo

Senior career*
Years	Team	Apps	(Gls)
2019	Kustošija	3	(0)
2019–2020	Tehničar 1974	10	(6)
2020–2021	Dubrava	10	(0)
2021	Gorica	6	(0)
2021–2023	Slaven Belupo	24	(1)
2022–2023	→ Dugopolje (loan)	33	(5)
2023–2025	Velež Mostar	60	(27)
2025–2026	Sarajevo	19	(4)
2026–	Zagłębie Lubin	4	(0)
- * Club domestic league appearances and goals as of 17:41, 29 May 2026 (UTC)

Mihael Mlinarić (born 16 June 2000) is a Croatian professional footballer who plays as a forward for Ekstraklasa club Zagłębie Lubin. He was the top goalscorer of the Bosnian Premier League in the 2024–25 season.

== Career statistics ==
As of match played 15 May 2026

Appearances and goals by club, season and competition
Club	Season	League			National cup (Note: Includes Croatian Cup, Bosnia and Herzegovina Cup)		Continental		Total	
Club	Season	Division	Apps	Goals	Apps	Goals	Apps	Goals	Apps	Goals
Kustošija	2019–20	Druga HNL	3	0	—		—		3	0
Tehničar 1974	2019–20	Treća HNL	10	6	—		—		3	0
Dubrava	2020–21	Druga HNL	10	0	—		—		10	0
Gorica	2020–21	Slovenian PrvaLiga	6	0	—		—		6	0
Slaven Belupo	2021–22	Croatian Football League	24	1	3	0	—		27	1
Dugopolje (loan)	2022–23	Druga HNL	33	5	—		—		33	5
Velež Mostar	2023–24	Bosnian Premier League	29	8	2	0	—		31	8
Velež Mostar	2024–25	Bosnian Premier League	31	19	4	2	2 (Note: Appearances in UEFA Conference League)	0	37	21
Velež Mostar	Total		60	27	6	2	2	0	68	29
Sarajevo	2025–26	Bosnian Premier League	19	4	1	0	2	0	22	4
Zagłębie Lubin	2025–26	Ekstraklasa	4	0	—		—		4	0
Career total			169	43	10	2	4	0	183	45

== Honours ==
Individual

- Bosnian Premier League top scorer: 2024–25
