= Francis Kyeremeh =

Ghanaian football forward (born 1997)

Personal information
- Full name: Francis Kyeremeh
- Date of birth: 23 June 1997 (age 29)
- Place of birth: Nsoatre, Ghana
- Height: 1.76 m (5 ft 9 in)
- Positions: Second striker; winger

Team information
- Current team: Sarajevo
- Number: 11

Youth career
- Brong Ahafo Stars
- 2015–2016: Jagodina

Senior career*
Years	Team	Apps	(Gls)
2014–2015	Brong Ahafo Stars	15	(4)
2015–2016	Jagodina	23	(3)
2016–2019	Radnik Surdulica	90	(4)
2019	Hapoel Tel Aviv	9	(1)
2020–2023	Žalgiris	79	(18)
2023–	Sarajevo	104	(13)

International career
2012–2013	Ghana U17	11	(4)
2013–2017	Ghana U20	25	(6)
- * Club domestic league appearances and goals as of 22 November 2026

Francis Kyeremeh (born 23 June 1997) is a Ghanaian professional footballer who plays as a forward for Bosnian Premier League club Sarajevo.

== Career ==
=== Jagodina ===
As a member of Ghana U20 national team, Kyeremeh arrived to Jagodina in summer 2015, from Brong Ahafo Stars, where he scored several goals for the 2015 season. After he passed the trial period, Jagodina decided to sign him. He scored a goal on his SuperLiga debut, against OFK Beograd on 13 September 2015. Kyeremeh also scored a goal against Metalac Gornji Milanovac during the first-half season. During the winter break off-season, Francis played with team a friendly match in his home country against Asante Kotoko. For the spring half-season, Francis also scored 1 goal in the first play-out match, against Novi Pazar. For the season, he made 23 league and 3 cup appearances. He also played several matches for youth selection before the end of season, helping team to survive in the Serbian youth league.

=== Radnik Surdulica ===
After a season he spent with Jagodina, Kyeremeh moved to Radnik Surdulica in 2016. He spent summer with team, playing several friendly matches during the pre-season and later signed a three-year contract with club. He made his official debut for new team in the 4 fixture of the 2016–17 Serbian SuperLiga season, against Rad.

=== Hapoel Tel Aviv ===
On 31 July 2019, Kyeremeh signed the Israeli Premier League club Hapoel Tel Aviv. In December 2019, Kyeremeh released from the club.

== Career statistics ==
=== Club ===
As of match played 22 November 2026

Appearances and goals by club, season and competition
Club	Season	League			National cup (Note: Includes Serbian Cup, Israel Cup, Lithuanian Cup, Bosnian Cup)		Continental		Other		Total	
Club	Season	Division	Apps	Goals	Apps	Goals	Apps	Goals	Apps	Goals	Apps	Goals
Brong Ahafo Stars	2015	Ghana Premier League	15	4	—		—		—		15	4
Jagodina	2015–16	Serbian SuperLiga	23	3	3	0	—		—		26	3
Radnik Surdulica	2016–17	Serbian SuperLiga	23	0	1	1	—		—		24	1
Radnik Surdulica	2017–18	Serbian SuperLiga	32	2	0	0	—		—		32	2
Radnik Surdulica	2018–19	Serbian SuperLiga	35	2	2	1	—		—		37	3
Radnik Surdulica	Total		90	4	3	2	—		—		93	6
Hapoel Tel Aviv	2019–20	Israeli Premier League	9	1	0	0	—		—		9	1
Žalgiris	2020	A Lyga	12	2	0	0	2 (Note: Appearance(s) in UEFA Europa League)	0	—		14	2
Žalgiris	2021	A Lyga	33	9	2	1	7 (Note: Four appearances in UEFA Champions League; two appearances in UEFA Europa League; one appearance in UEFA Europa Conference League)	0	—		42	10
Žalgiris	2022	A Lyga	34	7	5	0	13 (Note: Six appearances, one goal in UEFA Champions League; one appearance in UEFA Europa League; six appearances, one goal in UEFA Europa Conference League)	2	1 (Note: Appearance(s) in Lithuanian Supercup)	0	53	9
Žalgiris	Total		79	18	7	1	22	2	1	0	109	21
Sarajevo	2022–23	Bosnian Premier League	10	1	0	0	—		—		10	1
Sarajevo	2023–24	Bosnian Premier League	27	1	4	1	2 (Note: Appearances in UEFA Europa Conference League)	0	—		33	2
Sarajevo	2024–25	Bosnian Premier League	30	4	7	1	4	1	—		41	6
Sarajevo	2025–26	Bosnian Premier League	28	6	2	0	2	1	1 (Note: Appearance in Bosnian Supercup)	0	33	7
Sarajevo	2026–27	Bosnian Premier League	9	1	1	0	2	1	—		12	2
Sarajevo	Total		104	13	14	2	10	3	1	0	129	18
Career total			317	43	27	5	32	5	2	0	386	53

== Honours ==
Žalgiris

- A Lyga: 2020, 2021, 2022
- Lithuanian Football Cup: 2021, 2022

Sarajevo

- Bosnian Cup: 2024–25
