= Anomnachi Chidi =

Swedish–Nigerian footballer

Personal information
- Full name: Anomnachi Chinasa Chidi
- Date of birth: 13 July 2004 (age 22)
- Place of birth: Gothenburg, Sweden
- Position: Forward

Team information
- Current team: Sandvikens
- Number: 19

Youth career
- –2023: Häcken

Senior career*
| Years | Team | Apps | (Gls) |
| 2023 | Häcken | 1 | (0) |
| 2023 | → Ahlafors (loan) | 13 | (3) |
| 2024 | Nordic United | 29 | (13) |
| 2025–2026 | Celje | 12 | (2) |
| 2025 | → Sarajevo (loan) | 1 | (0) |
| 2026– | Sandvikens | 3 | (1) |
- * Club domestic league appearances and goals as of 12 November 2026

Anomnachi Chinasa Chidi (born 13 July 2004) is a Swedish-Nigerian professional footballer who plays as a forward for Superettan club Sandvikens.

== Career ==
=== Early career ===
Chidi began his football development in the youth academy of Swedish club BK Häcken before moving into senior football with Nordic United, where he scored 13 goals in 32 league appearances, playing primarily as a centre-forward.

=== NK Celje ===
In early 2025, Chidi completed a transfer to Slovenian side Celje on a contract running until 31 December 2027. With Celje, he featured in the Slovenian PrvaLiga, making 19 appearances, scoring two goals and providing four assists during the 2024–25 campaign.

=== Loan to Sarajevo ===
On 7 September 2025, Bosnian Premier League club FK Sarajevo announced the signing of Chidi on loan from NK Celje until 31 May 2026, with an option to make the transfer permanent. Chidi was brought to Sarajevo to add attacking depth to the squad. He played his first minutes for the club on 27 September 2025 in a 2:0 loss to city rivals Željezničar.

=== Sandvikens IF ===
On 28 February 2026, Chidi joined Superettan side Sandvikens IF on a three-year contract.

== Playing style ==
Primarily a centre-forward, Chidi is versatile across the front line and has also been deployed on the wings. He is known for his ability to contribute both goals and assists and adaptability to different offensive roles.

== Career statistics ==
As of match played 28 October 2025

Appearances and goals by club, season and competition
| Club | Season | League | | | National cup (Note: Includes Svenska Cupen, Slovenian Cup, Bosnia and Herzegovina Cup) | | Continental | | Total | |
| Club | Season | Division | Apps | Goals | Apps | Goals | Apps | Goals | Apps | Goals |
|---|---|---|---|---|---|---|---|---|---|---|
| Häcken | 2023 | Allsvenskan | 1 | 0 | — | | — | | 1 | 0 |
| Ahlafors (loan) | 2023 | Ettan Södra | 13 | 3 | — | | — | | 13 | 3 |
| Nordic United | 2024 | Ettan Norra | 29 | 13 | 3 | 0 | — | | 32 | 13 |
| Celje | 2024–25 | Slovenian PrvaLiga | 6 | 1 | 1 | 0 | — | | 7 | 1 |
| Celje | 2025–26 | Slovenian PrvaLiga | 6 | 1 | — | | 6 (Note: Four appearances in UEFA Europa League; two appearances in UEFA Conference League) | 0 | 12 | 1 |
| Celje | Total | | 12 | 2 | 1 | 0 | 6 | 0 | 19 | 2 |
| Sarajevo (loan) | 2025–26 | Bosnian Premier League | 1 | 0 | 1 | 0 | — | | 2 | 0 |
| Career total | | | 56 | 18 | 5 | 0 | 6 | 0 | 67 | 18 |
