= Nermin Mujkić =

Bosnian footballer

Personal information
- Date of birth: 8 February 2004 (age 22)
- Place of birth: Sarajevo, Bosnia and Herzegovina
- Height: 1.88 m (6 ft 2 in)
- Position: Centre-back

Team information
- Current team: Al Jazira
- Number: 39

Youth career
- 2015–2020: Sarajevo
- 2020–2021: Dinamo Zagreb
- 2021–2023: Istra

Senior career*
Years	Team	Apps	(Gls)
2023–2024	Sloboda Tuzla	29	(0)
2024–2026	Sarajevo	39	(2)
2024	Radnik Hadžići	7	(0)
2026–	Al Jazira	4	(0)

International career
2018	Bosnia and Herzegovina U15	2	(1)
2020	Bosnia and Herzegovina U17	1	(0)
2021	Bosnia and Herzegovina U18	2	(0)
2022	Bosnia and Herzegovina U19	2	(0)
2023–2026	Bosnia and Herzegovina U21	7	(0)
- * Club domestic league appearances and goals as of 18 October 2026

Nermin Mujkić (born 8 February 2004) is a Bosnian professional footballer who plays as a centre-back for UAE Pro League club Al Jazira, as well as the Bosnia and Herzegovina national under-21 team. Previously he played for Bosnian Premier League club Sarajevo and during 2024–25 season he played for Radnik Hadžići on dual registration.

== Career statistics ==
=== Club ===
As of match played 4 November 2026

Appearances and goals by club, season and competition
Club	Season	League			National cup (Note: Includes Bosnian Cup, UAE President's Cup)		League cup		Continental		Other		Total	
Club	Season	Division	Apps	Goals	Apps	Goals	Apps	Goals	Apps	Goals	Apps	Goals	Apps	Goals
Sloboda Tuzla	2023–24	First League of FBiH	29	0	1	0	—		—		—		30	0
Sarajevo	2024–25	Bosnian Premier League	17	0	7	0	—		0	0	—		24	0
Sarajevo	2025–26	Bosnian Premier League	22	2	3	0	—		0	0	1 (Note: Appearance in Bosnian Supercup)	0	26	2
Sarajevo	Total		39	2	10	0	—		0	0	1	0	50	2
Radnik Hadžići	2024–25	First League of FBiH	7	0	—		—		—		—		7	0
Al Jazira	2026–27	UAE Pro League	4	0	1	0	0	0	3 (Note: Appearances in AFC Champions League Two)	1	—		8	1
Career total			78	2	12	0	0	3	1	0	1	0	94	3

== Honours ==
Sarajevo

- Bosnian Cup: 2024–25
