= Agon Elezi =

Macedonian footballer (born 2001)

Personal information
- Date of birth: 1 March 2001 (age 25)
- Place of birth: Skopje, Macedonia
- Height: 1.81 m (5 ft 11 in)
- Position: Defensive midfielder

Team information
- Current team: Sarajevo
- Number: 20

Youth career
- 2014–2016: Shkupi
- 2016: Brooke House College
- 2017–2018: Caen

Senior career*
Years	Team	Apps	(Gls)
2017	Shkupi	2	(0)
2018–2019	Vëllazërimi 77	15	(1)
2019–2020	Skënderbeu	22	(0)
2020–2024	Varaždin	65	(8)
2024–2025	VfL Bochum	0	(0)
2024–2025	VfL Bochum II	7	(5)
2025	→ Gorica (loan)	16	(2)
2025–	Sarajevo	40	(11)

International career^{‡}
2017–2018	North Macedonia U17	5	(0)
2018	North Macedonia U18	1	(2)
2019	North Macedonia U19	3	(0)
2019–2022	North Macedonia U21	9	(0)
2022–	North Macedonia	20	(0)
- * Club domestic league appearances and goals as of 22 November 2026 ‡ National team caps and goals as of 16 November 2026

Agon Elezi (Macedonian: Агон Елези; born 1 March 2001) is a Macedonian professional footballer who plays as a defensive midfielder for Bosnian Premier League club Sarajevo.

== Club career ==
Born in Skopje, North Macedonia, he played for Shkupi in the North Macedonian First League between 2014 and 2016. In 2016 he attended Brooke House College Football Academy in Market Harborough. The academy plays fixtures in Cup Competitions, including ISFA, ESFA & County Cups. Alongside these competitions, players will play in a competitive game Programme from Professional Clubs to School sides. In the 2017–18 season Elezi signed a contract with the French side Caen where he spent a year of his youth career playing here.

On 30 January 2024, Elezi signed a three-and-a-half-year contract with VfL Bochum in the Bundesliga.

On 10 January 2025, Elezi returned to Croatia, joining Gorica on loan until the end of the season.

On 14 July 2025, his contract with Bochum was terminated by mutual consent.

On 16 July 2025, Elezi signed a three-year contract with Sarajevo.

== International career ==
Elezi was part of the Macedonia U21 national team. In the past, he was part of the U19 and U17 teams as well.

On 23 September 2022, he made his debut for the Macedonian national team in a UEFA Nations League match against Georgia. As of October 2026, he has earned a total of 17 caps.

== Career statistics ==
=== Club ===
As of match played 22 November 2026

Appearances and goals by club, season and competition
Club	Season	League			National cup (Note: Includes Albanian Cup, Croatian Cup, DFB-Pokal, Bosnian Cup)		Continental		Other		Total	
Club	Season	Division	Apps	Goals	Apps	Goals	Apps	Goals	Apps	Goals	Apps	Goals
Shkupi	2016–17	Macedonian First League	2	0	—		—		—		2	0
Vëllazërimi 77	2018–19	Macedonian Second League	15	1	—		—		—		15	1
Skënderbeu Korçë	2019–20	Kategoria Superiore	22	0	3	0	—		—		25	0
Varaždin	2020–21	Croatian Football League	16	1	1	0	—		—		17	1
Varaždin	2021–22	Druga HNL	5	2	1	0	—		—		6	1
Varaždin	2022–23	Croatian Football League	32	3	1	0	—		—		33	3
Varaždin	2023–24	Croatian Football League	12	2	—		—		—		12	2
Varaždin	Total		65	8	3	0	—		—		68	8
VfL Bochum	2023–24	Bundesliga	0	0	—		—		—		0	0
VfL Bochum	2024–25	Bundesliga	0	0	1	0	—		—		1	0
VfL Bochum	Total		0	0	1	0	—		—		1	0
VfL Bochum II	2024–25	Oberliga Westfalen	7	5	—		—		—		7	5
Gorica (loan)	2024–25	Croatian Football League	16	2	1	0	—		—		17	2
Sarajevo	2025–26	Bosnian Premier League	26	9	3	0	2 (Note: Appearances in UEFA Conference League)	0	1 (Note: Appearance in Bosnian Supercup)	0	32	9
Sarajevo	2026–27	Bosnian Premier League	14	2	1	0	2	0	—		17	2
Sarajevo	Total		40	11	4	0	4	0	1	0	49	11
Career total			167	27	12	0	4	0	1	0	184	27

=== International ===
As of match played 16 November 2026

Appearances and goals by national team and year
National team	Year	Apps	Goals
North Macedonia
North Macedonia	2022	2	0
North Macedonia	2023	7	0
North Macedonia	2024	1	0
North Macedonia	2025	2	0
North Macedonia	2026	8	0
Total		20	0

== Honours ==
Varaždin

- Druga nogometna liga: 2021–22
