= Shane Maroodza =

Zimbabwean footballer

Personal information
- Full name: Shane Takudzwa Maroodza
- Date of birth: 18 May 2004 (age 22)
- Place of birth: Bedfordshire, England
- Height: 1.91 m (6 ft 3 in)
- Position: Centre-back

Team information
- Current team: Sarajevo
- Number: 2

Youth career
- –2020: Leicester City
- 2020–2021: Huddersfield Town

Senior career*
Years	Team	Apps	(Gls)
2021–2024	Huddersfield Town	0	(0)
2021	→ Ossett United (loan)	1	(0)
2022	→ Bradford (Park Avenue) (loan)	6	(0)
2023	→ Bradford (Park Avenue) (loan)	5	(0)
2025	Barnet	0	(0)
2025	Kerry	1	(0)
2025–	Sarajevo	25	(0)

International career^{‡}
2024–	Zimbabwe	7	(0)
- * Club domestic league appearances and goals as of 22 November 2026 ‡ National team caps and goals as of 28 September 2026

Shane Takudzwa Maroodza (born 18 May 2004) is a professional footballer who plays as a centre-back for Bosnian Premier League club Sarajevo. Born in England, he plays for the Zimbabwe national team.

== Club career ==
=== Early career in England ===
Maroodza began his youth career with Leicester City before joining the Huddersfield Town academy. He joined Ossett United on a work experience loan in October 2021. In December 2021, he signed his first professional contract with Huddersfield Town. In the 2022–23 season he had two loan spells with Bradford (Park Avenue). He remained with Huddersfield until 2024, though he did not make a senior appearance. In January 2025, he made one appearance for Barnet in the FA Trophy.

=== Kerry ===
In July 2025, Maroodza joined Irish side Kerry, making one league appearance. However, he was released by the club shortly after joining after being caught shoplifting at a local supermarket.

=== Sarajevo ===
On 7 October 2025, Maroodza signed with Bosnian Premier League club Sarajevo on a contract until June 2027, having impressed while training with the club’s B team. He has since featured for Sarajevo in the Bosnian league. He quickly established himself as a starting centre-back under manager Mario Cvitanović.

== International career ==
Born in England, Maroodza was eligible to represent Zimbabwe at international level through his heritage. He received his first international call-up in March 2024 for a friendly "Four Nations Tournament" in Lilongwe. After appearing on the bench as an unused substitute in the semi-final against Zambia, Maroodza made his international debut as a late replacement in defeat to Kenya in the final on 26 March 2024.

== Career statistics ==
=== Club ===
As of match played 22 November 2026

Appearances and goals by club, season and competition
Club	Season	League			National cup (Note: Includes Bosnian Cup)		League cup		Continental		Other		Total	
Club	Season	Division	Apps	Goals	Apps	Goals	Apps	Goals	Apps	Goals	Apps	Goals	Apps	Goals
Huddersfield Town	2021–22	Championship	0	0	0	0	0	0	—		0	0	0	0
Huddersfield Town	2022–23	Championship	0	0	0	0	0	0	—		—		0	0
Huddersfield Town	2023–24	Championship	0	0	0	0	0	0	—		—		0	0
Huddersfield Town	Total		0	0	0	0	0	0	—		0	0	0	0
Ossett United (loan)	2021–22	NPL Division One East	1	0	—		—		—		1 (Note: Appearance in FA Trophy)	0	2	0
Bradford (Park Avenue) (loan)	2022–23	National League North	11	0	—		—		—		—		11	0
Barnet	2024–25	National League	0	0	—		—		—		1	0	1	0
Kerry	2025	League of Ireland First Division	1	0	—		—		—		—		1	0
Sarajevo	2025–26	Bosnian Premier League	19	0	2	0	—		—		1 (Note: Appearance in Bosnian Supercup)	0	22	0
Sarajevo	2026–27	Bosnian Premier League	6	0	0	0	—		2 (Note: Appearances in UEFA Conference League)	0	—		8	0
Sarajevo	Total		25	0	2	0	—		2	0	1	0	30	0
Career total			38	0	2	0	0	0	2	0	3	0	45	0

=== International ===
As of match played 28 September 2026

Appearances and goals by national team and year
National team	Year	Apps	Goals
Zimbabwe
Zimbabwe	2024	1	0
Zimbabwe	2026	6	0
Total		7	0
