= Amar Beganović =

Bosnian footballer

Personal information
- Date of birth: 25 November 1999 (age 26)
- Place of birth: Tuzla, Bosnia and Herzegovina
- Height: 1.84 m (6 ft 0 in)
- Position: Right-back

Team information
- Current team: Sarajevo
- Number: 22

Youth career
- 2005–2017: Sloboda Tuzla

Senior career*
| Years | Team | Apps | (Gls) |
| 2017–2022 | Sloboda Tuzla | 101 | (3) |
| 2022–2023 | Mura | 48 | (3) |
| 2023– | Sarajevo | 100 | (3) |

International career
| 2015 | Bosnia and Herzegovina U17 | | |
| 2017 | Bosnia and Herzegovina U19 | | |
| 2018–2020 | Bosnia and Herzegovina U21 | | |
- * Club domestic league appearances and goals as of 22 November 2026

Amar Beganović (Bosnian pronunciation: [ǎmaːr beɡâːnoʋitɕ]; born 25 November 1999) is a Bosnian professional footballer who plays as a right-back for Bosnian Premier League side Sarajevo.

Beganović started his senior career with hometown club Sloboda Tuzla in 2017, before joining Slovenian club Mura in 2022.

== Club career ==
Beganović came through youth academy of his hometown club Sloboda Tuzla, which he joined in 2005. He made his professional debut against Metalleghe-BSI on 4 March 2017 at the age of 17. On 22 September 2018, he scored his first goal in a 2–0 win over GOŠK Gabela.

In January 2022, he moved to Slovenian side Mura.

== International career ==
Beganović represented Bosnia and Herzegovina at all youth levels.

== Career statistics ==
=== Club ===
As of match played 22 November 2026

Appearances and goals by club, season and competition
| Club | Season | League | | | National cup (Note: Includes Bosnian Cup, Slovenian Cup) | | Continental | | Other | | Total | |
| Club | Season | Division | Apps | Goals | Apps | Goals | Apps | Goals | Apps | Goals | Apps | Goals |
|---|---|---|---|---|---|---|---|---|---|---|---|---|
| Sloboda Tuzla | 2016–17 | Bosnian Premier League | 2 | 0 | — | | — | | — | | 2 | 0 |
| Sloboda Tuzla | 2017–18 | Bosnian Premier League | 8 | 0 | 1 | 0 | — | | — | | 9 | 0 |
| Sloboda Tuzla | 2018–19 | Bosnian Premier League | 29 | 1 | 1 | 0 | — | | — | | 30 | 1 |
| Sloboda Tuzla | 2019–20 | Bosnian Premier League | 19 | 0 | 0 | 0 | — | | — | | 19 | 0 |
| Sloboda Tuzla | 2020–21 | Bosnian Premier League | 26 | 2 | 0 | 0 | — | | — | | 26 | 2 |
| Sloboda Tuzla | 2021–22 | Bosnian Premier League | 17 | 0 | 2 | 0 | — | | — | | 19 | 0 |
| Sloboda Tuzla | Total | | 101 | 3 | 4 | 0 | 0 | 0 | — | | 105 | 3 |
| Mura | 2021–22 | Slovenian PrvaLiga | 15 | 1 | — | | — | | — | | 15 | 1 |
| Mura | 2022–23 | Slovenian PrvaLiga | 33 | 2 | 2 | 0 | 4 (Note: Appearances in UEFA Europa Conference League) | 0 | — | | 39 | 2 |
| Mura | Total | | 48 | 3 | 2 | 0 | 4 | 0 | — | | 54 | 3 |
| Sarajevo | 2023–24 | Bosnian Premier League | 31 | 3 | 1 | 0 | 2 | 0 | — | | 34 | 3 |
| Sarajevo | 2024–25 | Bosnian Premier League | 28 | 0 | 6 | 0 | 4 | 0 | — | | 38 | 0 |
| Sarajevo | 2025–26 | Bosnian Premier League | 28 | 0 | 4 | 0 | 2 | 0 | 1 (Note: Appearance in Bosnian Supercup) | 0 | 35 | 0 |
| Sarajevo | 2026–27 | Bosnian Premier League | 13 | 0 | 1 | 0 | 2 | 0 | — | | 16 | 0 |
| Sarajevo | Total | | 100 | 3 | 12 | 0 | 10 | 0 | 1 | 0 | 123 | 3 |
| Career total | | | 249 | 9 | 18 | 0 | 14 | 0 | 1 | 0 | 282 | 9 |

== Honours ==
Sarajevo

- Bosnian Cup: 2024–25
