= João Carlos (footballer, born 1995) =

Brazilian association football player

Personal information
- Full name: João Carlos Cardoso Santo
- Date of birth: 1 March 1995 (age 31)
- Place of birth: Coaraci, Brazil
- Height: 1.87 m (6 ft 2 in)
- Position: Striker

Team information
- Current team: Guangdong GZ-Power
- Number: 20

Youth career
- –2016: Sampaio Corrêa

Senior career*
Years	Team	Apps	(Gls)
2016–2020	Sampaio Corrêa	11	(3)
2017	→ Galícia (loan)	3	(1)
2017	→ Bonsucesso (loan)	8	(0)
2017	→ Boa (loan)	0	(0)
2017	→ Macaé (loan)	4	(0)
2017–2018	→ Cabofriense (loan)	15	(4)
2018	→ Fluminense (loan)	6	(0)
2018–2019	→ Portimonense (loan)	14	(1)
2019	→ Ponte Preta (loan)	9	(0)
2020	→ CRB (loan)	15	(3)
2020–2024	Estoril	54	(4)
2021–2022	→ Académica de Coimbra (loan)	30	(17)
2024	Liaoning Tieren	15	(8)
2025	Guangdong GZ-Power	25	(13)
2026	Sarajevo	11	(2)
2026–	Guangdong GZ-Power	17	(4)
- * Club domestic league appearances and goals as of 7 November 2026

João Carlos Cardoso Santo (born 1 March 1995), or simply João Carlos, is a Brazilian professional footballer who plays as a striker for China League One club Guangdong GZ-Power.

== Club career ==
On 31 August 2018, he joined Portimonense S.C. on loan for the 2018–19 season.

On 3 August 2021, he was loaned to Académica de Coimbra in Liga Portugal 2.

On 16 January 2026, Guangdong GZ-Power announced his departure after the 2025 season.

On 19 February 2026, Carlos signed a one-year contract with Bosnian Premier League club Sarajevo.

On 1 July 2026, Carlos returned to Guangdong GZ-Power.

== Career statistics ==
As of match played 7 November 2026

Appearances and goals by club, season and competition
Club	Season	League			State league		National cup (Note: Includes Taça de Portugal, Chinese FA Cup, Bosnian Cup)		League cup (Note: Includes Taça da Liga)		Continental		Other		Total	
Club	Season	Division	Apps	Goals	Apps	Goals	Apps	Goals	Apps	Goals	Apps	Goals	Apps	Goals	Apps	Goals
Galícia (loan)	2017	Série D	3	1	—		—		—		—		—		3	1
Bonsucesso (loan)	2017	Carioca	—		8	0	—		—		—		—		8	0
Boa (loan)	2017	Série B	0	0	—		—		—		—		—		0	0
Macaé (loan)	2017	Série C	4	0	—		—		—		—		—		4	0
Cabofriense (loan)	2018	Carioca	—		15	4	—		—		—		—		15	4
Fluminense (loan)	2018	Série A	6	0	—		—		—		0	0	—		6	0
Portimonense (loan)	2018–19	Primeira Liga	14	1	—		1	0	—		—		—		15	1
Ponte Preta (loan)	2019	Série B	9	0	—		—		—		—		—		9	0
CRB (loan)	2020	Série B	3	0	5	2	0	0	—		—		6	1	14	3
Estoril	2020–21	Liga Portugal 2	11	0	—		4	0	0	0	—		—		15	0
Estoril	2021–22	Primeira Liga	—		—		—		1	0	—		—		1	0
Estoril	2022–23	Primeira Liga	23	2	—		1	0	2	0	—		—		26	2
Estoril	2023–24	Primeira Liga	20	2	—		1	1	4	3	—		—		25	6
Estoril	Total		54	4	—		6	1	7	3	—		—		67	8
Académica de Coimbra (loan)	2021–22	Liga Portugal 2	30	17	—		2	0	—		—		—		32	17
Liaoning Tieren	2024	China League One	15	8	—		—		—		—		—		15	8
Guangdong GZ-Power	2025	China League One	25	13	—		3	1	—		—		—		28	14
Sarajevo	2025–26	Bosnian Premier League	11	2	—		1	1	—		—		1 (Note: Appearance in Bosnian Supercup)	0	13	3
Guangdong GZ-Power	2026	China League One	17	4	—		—		—		—		—		17	4
Career total			191	50	28	6	13	3	7	3	0	0	7	1	246	63

== Honours ==
Estoril

- Liga Portugal 2: 2020–21

Guangdong GZ-Power

- China League One: 2026

Individual

- Liga Portugal 2 Top Scorer: 2021–22
- Liga Portugal 2 Team of the Season: 2021–22
- Liga Portugal 2 Player of the Month: February 2022
- Liga Portugal 2 Forward of the Month: February 2022, March 2023
