= Andreja Ristić =

Serbian footballer

Personal information
- Date of birth: 8 January 2004 (age 22)
- Place of birth: Smederevska Palanka, Serbia
- Height: 1.85 m (6 ft 1 in)
- Position: Forward

Team information
- Current team: Sarajevo

Youth career
- –2023: Radnički 1923

Senior career*
Years	Team	Apps	(Gls)
2022–2024	Radnički 1923	3	(0)
2023	→ Radnički Pirot (loan)		
2024–	Sarajevo	7	(0)
2024–2025	Radnik Hadžići	23	(13)
2026	→ Javor Ivanjica (loan)	10	(0)
- * Club domestic league appearances and goals as of 24 May 2026

Andreja Ristić (born 8 January 2004) is a Serbian professional footballer who plays as a forward Bosnian Premier League club Sarajevo.

== Career ==
In 2022, Ristić signed his first professional contract for his childhood club Radnički 1923. On June 25, 2024, Ristić signed three-year deal for Bosnian club Sarajevo. In season 2024–25 Ristić was registered to play both for Sarajevo and First League of FBiH club Radnik Hadžići.

== Career statistics ==
=== Club ===
As of match played 24 May 2026

Appearances and goals by club, season and competition
Club	Season	League			National cup (Note: Includes Serbian Cup, Bosnia and Herzegovina Cup)		Continental		Total	
Club	Season	Division	Apps	Goals	Apps	Goals	Apps	Goals	Apps	Goals
Radnički 1923	2021–22	Serbian SuperLiga	3	0	1	0	—		4	0
Radnički 1923	2022–23	Serbian SuperLiga	0	0	0	0	—		0	0
Radnički 1923	2023–24	Serbian SuperLiga	0	0	0	0	—		0	0
Radnički 1923	Total		3	0	1	0	—		4	0
Sarajevo	2024–25	Bosnian Premier League	3	0	2	0	0	0	5	0
Sarajevo	2025–26	Bosnian Premier League	4	0	1	0	—		5	0
Sarajevo	Total		7	0	3	0	0	0	10	0
Radnik Hadžići	2024–25	First League of FBiH	23	13	—		—		23	13
Javor Ivanjica (loan)	2025–26	Serbian SuperLiga	10	0	—		—		10	0
Career total			43	13	4	0	0	0	47	13

== Honours ==
Radnički 1923

- Serbian First League: 2020–21

Sarajevo

- Bosnian Cup: 2024–25
