= Mihael Kuprešak =

Croatian footballer

Personal information
- Date of birth: 15 May 2001 (age 25)
- Place of birth: Orašje, Bosnia and Herzegovina
- Height: 1.82 m (6 ft 0 in)
- Position: Left-back

Team information
- Current team: Sarajevo
- Number: 77

Youth career
- –2019: Osijek

Senior career*
Years	Team	Apps	(Gls)
2019–2022	Osijek II	63	(5)
2022–2024	Široki Brijeg	57	(6)
2024–	Sarajevo	69	(7)

International career
2016	Croatia U16	2	(0)
2016–2018	Croatia U17	13	(0)
2018	Croatia U18	4	(0)
2019–2020	Croatia U19	13	(2)
2021–2022	Croatia U20	5	(0)
- * Club domestic league appearances and goals as of 22 November 2026

Mihael Kuprešak (born 15 May 2001) is a Croatian professional footballer who plays as a left-back for Bosnian Premier League club Sarajevo. He is a former Croatian youth international.

== Career statistics ==
As of match played 22 November 2026

Appearances and goals by club, season and competition
Club	Season	League			National cup (Note: Includes Bosnian Cup)		Continental		Total	
Club	Season	Division	Apps	Goals	Apps	Goals	Apps	Goals	Apps	Goals
Osijek II	2019–20	Druga HNL	2	0	—		—		2	0
Osijek II	2020–21	Druga HNL	33	3	—		—		33	3
Osijek II	2021–22	Druga HNL	28	2	—		—		28	2
Osijek II	Total		63	5	—		—		63	5
Široki Brijeg	2022–23	Bosnian Premier League	26	1	1	0	—		27	1
Široki Brijeg	2023–24	Bosnian Premier League	31	5	5	0	—		36	5
Široki Brijeg	Total		57	6	6	0	—		63	6
Sarajevo	2024–25	Bosnian Premier League	22	1	7	0	1 (Note: Appearance(s) in UEFA Conference League)	0	30	1
Sarajevo	2025–26	Bosnian Premier League	33	6	4	1	2	0	39	7
Sarajevo	2026–27	Bosnian Premier League	14	0	1	0	2	0	17	0
Sarajevo	Total		69	7	12	1	5	0	86	8
Career total			189	18	18	1	5	0	212	20

== Honours ==
Sarajevo

- Bosnian Cup: 2024–25
