= Rijad Telalović =

Bosnian footballer (born 2008)

Personal information
- Date of birth: 28 September 2008 (age 18)
- Place of birth: Zenica, Bosnia and Herzegovina
- Position: Midfielder

Team information
- Current team: Sarajevo
- Number: 5

Youth career
- 2015–2025: Čelik Zenica

Senior career*
| Years | Team | Apps | (Gls) |
| 2025–2026 | Čelik Zenica | 10 | (3) |
| 2026– | Sarajevo | 11 | (0) |

International career^{‡}
| 2025– | Bosnia and Herzegovina U19 | 9 | (1) |
- * Club domestic league appearances and goals as of 17 October 2026 ‡ National team caps and goals as of 31 March 2026

Rijad Telalović (born 28 September 2008) is a Bosnian professional footballer who plays as a midfielder for Bosnian Premier League club Sarajevo. He is regarded as one of the biggest prospects in Bosnian football.

== Club career ==
Telalović began his career in the youth system of NK Čelik Zenica and made his senior debut for the club during the 2024–25 season in a cup match. In the first half of the 2025–26 season, he established himself as a regular member of the first team. In January 2026, he signed a contract with FK Sarajevo running until the end of 2028, with the transfer reportedly valued at €200,000. He made his debut for the club on 6 February 2026, appearing as a second-half substitute against Radnik Bijeljina. On 15 February, he made his first start in an away match against Sloga Doboj.

== International career ==
Telalović has represented Bosnia and Herzegovina at youth international level. In 2025 and 2026 he appeared for the Bosnia and Herzegovina under-19 national team, earning at least four caps and scoring one goal in international competition.

== Style of play ==
Telalović primarily operates as a central midfielder, with the versatility to play in both defensive and central midfield roles. He has been noted for his composure in possession and tactical awareness relative to his age.

== Career statistics ==
As of match played 17 October 2026

Appearances and goals by club, season and competition
| Club | Season | League | | | Bosnian Cup | | Total | |
| Club | Season | Division | Apps | Goals | Apps | Goals | Apps | Goals |
|---|---|---|---|---|---|---|---|---|
| Čelik Zenica | 2024–25 | First League of FBiH | 0 | 0 | 1 | 0 | 1 | 0 |
| Čelik Zenica | 2025–26 | First League of FBiH | 10 | 3 | 1 | 0 | 11 | 3 |
| Čelik Zenica | Total | | 10 | 3 | 2 | 0 | 12 | 3 |
| Sarajevo | 2025–26 | Bosnian Premier League | 10 | 0 | 2 | 0 | 12 | 0 |
| Sarajevo | 2026–27 | Bosnian Premier League | 1 | 0 | 0 | 0 | 1 | 0 |
| Sarajevo | Total | | 11 | 0 | 2 | 0 | 13 | 0 |
| Career total | | | 21 | 3 | 4 | 0 | 25 | 3 |
