= Grigore Turda =

Romanian footballer (born 1997)

Personal information
- Full name: Grigore Ioan Turda
- Date of birth: 24 July 1997 (age 29)
- Place of birth: Sighetu Marmației, Romania
- Height: 1.88 m (6 ft 2 in)
- Position: Centre back

Team information
- Current team: Žalgiris
- Number: 5

Youth career
- 2005–2011: Sighetu Marmației
- 2011–2015: Ardealul Cluj

Senior career*
Years	Team	Apps	(Gls)
2015–2016	Sighetu Marmației		
2016	Foresta Suceava	1	(0)
2016–2017	FC Zalău		
2017–2018	Pandurii Târgu Jiu	22	(0)
2018–2024	Argeș Pitești	148	(6)
2024	Voluntari	11	(0)
2024–2025	Gloria Buzău	32	(0)
2025	Sarajevo	7	(0)
2026–	Žalgiris	21	(1)
- * Club domestic league appearances and goals as of 19 September 2026

Grigore Ioan Turda (born 24 July 1997) is a Romanian professional footballer who plays as a centre back for TOPLYGA club Žalgiris.

== Career ==
On 21 June 2025, Turda signed a two-year contract with Bosnian Premier League club Sarajevo. On 15 January 2025 signed with lithuanian Žalgiris Club.

== Career statistics ==
=== Club ===
As of match played 19 September 2026

Appearances and goals by club, season and competition
Club	Season	League			National cup (Note: Includes Cupa României, Bosnia and Herzegovina Cup)		Continental		Other		Total	
Club	Season	Division	Apps	Goals	Apps	Goals	Apps	Goals	Apps	Goals	Apps	Goals
Foresta Suceava	2016–17	Liga II	1	0	—		—		—		1	0
Pandurii Târgu Jiu	2017–18	Liga II	22	0	0	0	—		—		22	0
Argeș Pitești	2018–19	Liga II	32	0	0	0	—		—		32	0
Argeș Pitești	2019–20	Liga II	18	1	0	0	—		—		18	1
Argeș Pitești	2020–21	Liga I	27	1	0	0	—		—		27	1
Argeș Pitești	2021–22	Liga I	37	2	2	0	—		—		39	2
Argeș Pitești	2022–23	Liga I	20	1	1	0	—		2 (Note: Appearances in Liga I relegation/promotion play-offs)	0	23	1
Argeș Pitești	2023–24	Liga II	14	1	0	0	—		—		14	1
Argeș Pitești	Total		148	6	3	0	—		2	0	153	6
Voluntari	2023–24	Liga I	11	0	2	0	—		—		13	0
Gloria Buzău	2024–25	Liga I	32	0	1	0	—		—		33	0
Sarajevo	2025–26	Bosnian Premier League	7	0	1	0	2 (Note: Appearances in UEFA Conference League)	0	—		10	0
Žalgiris	2026	TOPLYGA	21	1	1	0	2	0	—		24	1
Career total			242	7	8	0	4	0	2	0	256	7
