= Anes Krdžalić =

Bosnian footballer (born 2004)

Personal information
- Full name: Anes Krdžalić
- Date of birth: 28 August 2004 (age 22)
- Place of birth: Doboj, Bosnia and Herzegovina
- Height: 1.80 m (5 ft 11 in)
- Position: Defensive midfielder

Team information
- Current team: Tenerife
- Number: 23

Youth career
- 2010–: Euro Football Gračanica
- Sloga Doboj
- Tempo Sport Zenica
- 2013–2023: Dinamo Zagreb

Senior career*
Years	Team	Apps	(Gls)
2023	Kustošija	0	(0)
2023	→ Olimpija Ljubljana (loan)	15	(3)
2023	Dinamo Zagreb	0	(0)
2023	→ Lokomotiva Zagreb (loan)	2	(0)
2024–2026	Sarajevo	29	(4)
2026–	Tenerife	6	(0)

International career^{‡}
2021–2022	Bosnia and Herzegovina U19	14	(1)
2022–2026	Bosnia and Herzegovina U21	15	(0)
- * Club domestic league appearances and goals as of 19 September 2026 ‡ National team caps and goals as of 6 October 2026

Anes Krdžalić (pronounced [ǎnes křdʒalitɕ]; born 28 August 2004) is a Bosnian professional footballer who plays as a defensive midfielder for Segunda División club Tenerife and the Bosnia and Herzegovina U21 national team.

== Club career ==
=== Early career ===
Krdžalić started practicing football in 2010 at the Euro Football academy in Gračanica, soon moving on to Sloga Doboj, and playing some tournaments for Nermin Šabić's Tempo Sport academy from Zenica, before joining the GNK Dinamo Zagreb Academy in Croatia where he would stay until January 2023 when he left to join Kustošija. In February, he was loaned to Slovenian team Olimpija Ljubljana until the end of season. He made his professional debut against Bravo on 11 February at the age of 18 and managed to score a goal.

=== Dinamo Zagreb ===
In June, Krdžalić returned to Dinamo Zagreb on a three-year deal. He won his first trophy with the club on 15 July, by defeating their biggest rivals Hajduk Split in the 2023 Croatian Super Cup game.

In August, he was sent on a season-long loan to Lokomotiva.

=== Sarajevo ===
On 8 January 2024, Krdžalić signed a two-and-a-half-year contract with Sarajevo.

=== Tenerife ===
On 4 July 2026, free agent Krdžalić agreed to a three-year deal with Tenerife, newly promoted to Segunda División.

== International career ==
Krdžalić represented Bosnia and Herzegovina at various youth levels.

== Career statistics ==
=== Club ===
As of match played 19 September 2026

Appearances and goals by club, season and competition
Club	Season	League			National cup (Note: Includes Slovenian Cup, Croatian Cup, Bosnian Cup)		Continental		Other		Total	
Club	Season	Division	Apps	Goals	Apps	Goals	Apps	Goals	Apps	Goals	Apps	Goals
Olimpija Ljubljana	2022–23	Slovenian PrvaLiga	15	3	3	0	—		—		18	3
Dinamo Zagreb	2023–24	Croatian Football League	0	0	0	0	0	0	—		0	0
Lokomotiva (loan)	2023–24	Croatian Football League	2	0	1	0	—		—		3	0
Sarajevo	2023–24	Bosnian Premier League	0	0	1	0	—		—		1	0
Sarajevo	2024–25	Bosnian Premier League	10	1	3	0	—		—		13	1
Sarajevo	2025–26	Bosnian Premier League	19	3	3	0	0	0	1 (Note: Appearance in Bosnian Supercup)	0	23	3
Sarajevo	Total		29	4	7	0	0	0	1	0	37	4
Tenerife	2026–27	Segunda División	6	0	0	0	—		—		6	0
Career total			52	7	11	0	0	0	1	0	64	7

== Honours ==
Olimpija Ljubljana

- Slovenian PrvaLiga: 2022–23
- Slovenian Cup: 2022–23

Dinamo Zagreb

- Croatian Super Cup: 2023

Sarajevo

- Bosnian Cup: 2024–25
