= Luka Hujber =

Croatian footballer (born 1999)

Personal information
- Date of birth: June 16, 1999 (age 27)
- Place of birth: Nova Gradiška, Croatia
- Position: Right-back

Team information
- Current team: Sarajevo
- Number: 27

Youth career
- –2013: Mladost Cernik
- 2013-18: Lokomotiva

Senior career*
Years	Team	Apps	(Gls)
2017–2020	Lokomotiva	21	(1)
2019–2020	→ Dinamo Zagreb II (loan)	15	(0)
2020–2024	Istra 1961	102	(1)
2024–2025	Vejle	21	(0)
2026–	Sarajevo	12	(0)

International career
2015	Croatia U17	2	(0)
2017	Croatia U19	3	(0)
2018–2019	Croatia U20	3	(0)
2019	Croatia U21	3	(0)
2023	Croatia U23	1	(0)
- * Club domestic league appearances and goals as of 22 November 2026

Luka Hujber (born 16 June 1999 in Croatia) is a Croatian professional footballer who plays as right-back for Bosnian Premier League club Sarajevo.

== Career ==
On 8 July 2024, Danish Superliga side Vejle Boldklub confirmed that Hujber joined the club on a deal until June 2027. On 21 January 2026, Hujber signed a contract with Bosnian Premier League club Sarajevo.

== Career statistics ==
=== Club ===
As of match played 22 November 2026

Appearances and goals by club, season and competition
Club	Season	League			National cup (Note: Includes Croatian Cup, Danish Cup, Bosnian Cup)		Continental		Total	
Club	Season	Division	Apps	Goals	Apps	Goals	Apps	Goals	Apps	Goals
Lokomotiva Zagreb	2016–17	Croatian Football League	1	0	—		—		1	0
Lokomotiva Zagreb	2017–18	Croatian Football League	4	1	—		—		4	1
Lokomotiva Zagreb	2018–19	Croatian Football League	14	0	1	0	—		15	0
Lokomotiva Zagreb	2019–20	Croatian Football League	1	0	—		—		1	0
Lokomotiva Zagreb	2020–21	Croatian Football League	1	0	—		—		1	0
Lokomotiva Zagreb	Total		21	1	1	0	—		22	1
Dinamo Zagreb II (loan)	2019–20	Prva NL	15	0	—		—		15	0
Istra 1961	2020–21	Croatian Football League	22	0	3	0	—		25	0
Istra 1961	2021–22	Croatian Football League	24	0	3	0	—		27	0
Istra 1961	2022–23	Croatian Football League	33	1	2	0	—		35	1
Istra 1961	2023–24	Croatian Football League	23	0	1	0	—		24	0
Istra 1961	Total		102	1	9	0	—		111	1
Vejle	2024–25	Danish Superliga	19	0	1	0	—		20	0
Vejle	2025–26	Danish Superliga	2	0	1	0	—		3	0
Vejle	Total		21	0	2	0	—		23	0
Sarajevo	2025–26	Bosnian Premier League	6	0	2	0	—		8	0
Sarajevo	2026–27	Bosnian Premier League	6	0	1	0	2 (Note: Appearances in UEFA Conference League)	0	9	0
Sarajevo	Total		12	0	3	0	2	0	17	0
Career total			171	2	15	0	2	0	188	2
