= Matej Šakota =

Bosnian footballer

Personal information
- Date of birth: 16 August 2004 (age 22)
- Place of birth: Mostar, Bosnia and Herzegovina
- Height: 1.87 m (6 ft 2 in)
- Position: Forward

Team information
- Current team: Umm Salal

Youth career
- 2009–2022: Zrinjski Mostar

Senior career*
Years	Team	Apps	(Gls)
2022	Zrinjski Mostar	8	(1)
2022–2023	Dinamo Zagreb	0	(0)
2023–2025	Slaven Belupo	49	(5)
2025–2026	Zrinjski Mostar	33	(6)
2026–	Umm Salal	0	(0)

International career
2018	Bosnia and Herzegovina U15	2	(0)
2018–2019	Bosnia and Herzegovina U16	2	(0)
2019–2020	Bosnia and Herzegovina U17	2	(0)
2020–2021	Bosnia and Herzegovina U18	4	(0)
2021–2022	Bosnia and Herzegovina U19	20	(5)
2023–2025	Bosnia and Herzegovina U21	6	(0)
- * Club domestic league appearances and goals as of 9 August 2026

Matej Šakota (born 16 August 2004) is a Bosnian footballer who plays as a forward for Qatar Stars League club Umm Salal.

== Club career ==
Born in Mostar, Šakota progressed through the youth academy of Zrinjski Mostar, signing a professional contract with the club in September 2021. On scoring in a 2–0 victory over Sloboda in May 2022, he broke Ivan Bubalo's 26-year-old record to become Zrinjski's youngest ever goalscorer.

In August 2022, he transferred to Croatian side Dinamo Zagreb, signing a five-year contract.

== International career ==
Šakota has been selected and represented Bosnia and Herzegovina at levels Under-15, U16, U17, U18, and has played 20 games for the Under-19 team so far.

== Personal life ==
Šakota's brother, Filip, is also a footballer, and currently plays for the academy of Zrinjski.

== Career statistics ==
=== Club ===
As of match played 9 August 2026

Appearances and goals by club, season and competition
Club	Season	League			National cup (Note: Includes Croatian Cup, Bosnian Cup)		Continental		Other		Total	
Club	Season	Division	Apps	Goals	Apps	Goals	Apps	Goals	Apps	Goals	Apps	Goals
Zrinjski Mostar	2021–22	Bosnian Premier League	7	1	—		—		—		7	1
Zrinjski Mostar	2022–23	Bosnian Premier League	1	0	—		—		—		1	0
Zrinjski Mostar	Total		8	1	—		—		—		8	1
Slaven Belupo	2023–24	1. HNL	27	3	2	0	—		—		29	3
Slaven Belupo	2024–25	1. HNL	22	2	4	0	—		—		26	2
Slaven Belupo	Total		49	5	6	0	—		—		55	5
Zrinjski Mostar	2025–26	Bosnian Premier League	32	6	5	0	11 (Note: Four appearances in UEFA Europa League; seven appearances in UEFA Conference League)	0	1 (Note: Appearance in Bosnian Supercup)	0	49	6
Zrinjski Mostar	2026–27	Bosnian Premier League	1	0	0	0	2 (Note: Appearances in UEFA Conference League)	1	0	0	3	1
Zrinjski Mostar	Total		33	6	5	0	13	1	1	0	52	7
Career total			90	12	11	0	13	1	1	0	115	13
