= Serhiy Ihnatkov =

Ukrainian footballer (born 2007)

Personal information
- Birth name: Sergej Ignatkov
- Date of birth: 29 April 2007 (age 19)
- Place of birth: Trebinje, Bosnia and Herzegovina
- Height: 1.88 m (6 ft 2 in)
- Position: Defensive midfielder

Team information
- Current team: Sarajevo
- Number: 35

Youth career
- –2024: Zrinjski Mostar
- 2024–2025: Sarajevo

Senior career*
Years	Team	Apps	(Gls)
2025–	Sarajevo	33	(0)

International career^{‡}
2021	Bosnia and Herzegovina U15	6	(0)
2023	Bosnia and Herzegovina U16	4	(3)
2023–2024	Bosnia and Herzegovina U17	6	(1)
2026–	Ukraine U19	3	(0)
- * Club domestic league appearances and goals as of 1 November 2026 ‡ National team caps and goals as of 5 July 2026

Serhiy Ihnatkov (Note: Bosnian: Sergej Ignatkov Ukrainian: Сергій Ігнатков, romanized: Serhiy Ihnatkov Russian: Сергей Игнатков, romanized: Sergey Ignaktov Serbian: Сергеј Игнатков, romanized: Sergej Ignatkov Macedonian: Сергеј Игнатков, romanized: Sergej Ignatkov) (born 29 April 2007) is a professional footballer who plays as a defensive midfielder for Bosnian Premier League club Sarajevo. Born in Bosnia and Herzegovina, he has committed to play for Ukraine.

== Club career ==
Ihnatkov began his football development in the youth ranks of Zrinjski Mostar, where he was regarded as one of the club's most promising young players. In January 2024, he joined the academy of Sarajevo, continuing his development in the club's under-19 setup. He featured prominently in Sarajevo's youth league teams, making multiple appearances for the under-19 side in the 2024–25 season in both the Premier League and the UEFA Youth League. On 7 February 2024, he signed his first professional contract with the club.

In October 2025, Ihnatkov made his debut for Sarajevo's senior team in the Bosnian Premier League, becoming one of the youngest players to appear for the club in top-flight competition. He quickly established himself as a first team regular under manager Mario Cvitanović.

== International career ==
Ihnatkov was born in Trebinje, Bosnia and Herzegovina and is of Ukrainian descent through his father, while his mother is from Trebinje. He was eligible to represent five countries on international level, either Bosnia and Herzegovina (by birth), Ukraine (through his father), Russia (through his paternal grandmother), Serbia (through his maternal grandfather) or North Macedonia (through his maternal grandmother).

Ihnatkov began his international career with Bosnia and Herzegovina youth teams, appearing for the U15, U16, and U17 squads. Between 2023 and 2024, he earned six caps and scored one goal for the under-17 team, including appearances in UEFA European Under-17 Championship qualification matches.

On 7 May 2026, Ihnatkov's request to switch allegiance to Ukraine was approved by FIFA.

== Style of play ==
Ihnatkov primarily features as a defensive midfielder, known for his physical presence, defensive positioning, and ability to contribute to both defensive duties and transitional play. He has also been deployed occasionally as a centre-back, demonstrating positional versatility.

== Career statistics ==
As of match played 1 November 2026

Appearances and goals by club, season and competition
Club	Season	League			Bosnian Cup		Total	
Club	Season	Division	Apps	Goals	Apps	Goals	Apps	Goals
Sarajevo	2025–26	Bosnian Premier League	22	0	2	0	24	0
Sarajevo	2026–27	Bosnian Premier League	11	0	0	0	11	0
Sarajevo	Total		33	0	2	0	35	0
Career total			33	0	2	0	35	0
