= Sanin Mušija =

Bosnian footballer

Personal information
- Date of birth: 29 June 2005 (age 21)
- Place of birth: Zenica, Bosnia and Herzegovina
- Height: 1.90 m (6 ft 3 in)
- Position: Goalkeeper

Team information
- Current team: Sarajevo
- Number: 13

Youth career
- –2022: Mladost Doboj Kakanj

Senior career*
Years	Team	Apps	(Gls)
2022–2024	Mladost Doboj Kakanj	35	(0)
2024–	Sarajevo	11	(0)
2024	→ Mladost Doboj Kakanj (loan)	12	(0)
2024–2025	Radnik Hadžići	13	(0)
- * Club domestic league appearances and goals as of 21 May 2026

Sanin Mušija (born 29 June 2005) is a Bosnian professional footballer who plays as a goalkeeper for Bosnian Premier League club Sarajevo.

== Club career ==
=== Mladost Doboj Kakanj ===
Mušija began his senior career with Mladost Doboj Kakanj, competing in the First League of FBiH. He made 35 league appearances for the club, conceding 33 goals and keeping three clean sheets during the 2023–24 season.

=== FK Sarajevo ===
In January 2024, Mušija signed with Bosnian Premier League side FK Sarajevo. He was initially loaned back to Mladost and later spent time on dual registration at Radnik Hadžići during the 2024–25 season.

He made his first-team appearances for Sarajevo in the 2025–26 Premier League season and quickly established himself as first-choice keeper under managers Zoran Zekić and Husref Musemić.

=== Contract extension ===
In July 2025, Mušija signed a contract extension with FK Sarajevo, keeping him at the club until June 2028.

== International career ==
Mušija has been involved in youth setups and is eligible to represent Bosnia and Herzegovina internationally. He received his first call-up for under-21 competitions on 21 October 2025.

== Playing style ==
As a goalkeeper, Mušija is noted for his height, shot-stopping ability and ability to play with both feet in a pseudo-sweeper role.

== Career statistics ==
=== Club ===
As of match played 27 October 2026

Appearances and goals by club, season and competition
Club	Season	League			National cup (Note: Includes Bosnian Cup)		Continental		Total	
Club	Season	Division	Apps	Goals	Apps	Goals	Apps	Goals	Apps	Goals
Mladost Doboj Kakanj	2021–22	First League of FBiH	1	0	—		—		1	0
Mladost Doboj Kakanj	2022–23	First League of FBiH	19	0	—		—		19	0
Mladost Doboj Kakanj	2023–24	First League of FBiH	15	0	1	0	—		16	0
Mladost Doboj Kakanj	Total		35	0	1	0	—		36	0
Sarajevo	2024–25	Bosnian Premier League	0	0	0	0	—		0	0
Sarajevo	2025–26	Bosnian Premier League	11	0	1	0	0	0	12	0
Sarajevo	2026–27	Bosnian Premier League	0	0	1	0	0	0	1	0
Sarajevo	Total		11	0	2	0	0	0	13	0
Mladost Doboj Kakanj (loan)	2023–24	First League of FBiH	12	0	—		—		12	0
Radnik Hadžići	2024–25	First League of FBiH	13	0	—		—		13	0
Career total			71	0	3	0	0	0	74	0
