= 2025–26 Bosnia and Herzegovina Football Cup =

Football tournament season

30th Bosnia and Herzegovina Football Cup

Tournament details
- Country: Bosnia and Herzegovina
- Dates: 28 October 2025 – 13 May 2026
- Teams: 32

Final positions
- Champions: Zrinjski Mostar (4th title)
- Runners-up: Velež Mostar

Tournament statistics
- Matches played: 38
- Goals scored: 109 (2.87 per match)
- Top goal scorer(s): Enes Alić; Ivan Nikolov; Armin Spahić; Ivan Šarić (4 goals each)

The 2025–26 Bosnia and Herzegovina Football Cup was the 30th edition of Bosnia and Herzegovina's annual football cup, and the twenty fifth season of the unified competition. The winners of the cup qualified for the 2026–27 UEFA Conference League second qualifying round.

Sarajevo were the defending champions. Zrinjski Mostar won the tournament for the fourth time, defeating rivals Velež Mostar in the final.

== Calendar ==
Round	Date(s)
First round	7 October 2025 (draw); 28 and 29 October, and 12 November 2025
Second round	2 December 2025 (draw); 10, 11 and 12 February 2026
Quarter-finals	2 December 2025 (draw); 25 February and 5 March 2026 (leg 1); 10, 11 and 17 March 2026 (leg 2)
Semi-finals	17 March 2026 (draw); 8 April 2026 (leg 1); 15 April 2026 (leg 2)
Final	29 April 2026 (draw)^{1} 6 May 2026 (leg 1); 13 May 2026 (leg 2)

^{1} Draw was held to determine which team hosted leg 1 and which team hosted leg 2.

== First round ==
Played on 28 and 29 October, and on 12 November 2025.

Home team	Away team	Result
Radnik Hadžići (II)	Sarajevo (I)	0–3
Majevica (III)	Velež Mostar (I)	0–1
BSK Banja Luka (II)	Rudar Prijedor (I)	0–6
Gradina (III)	Široki Brijeg (I)	1–4
Laktaši (II)	Zvijezda 09 (II)	3–1
GOŠK Gabela (II)	Tuzla City (II)	5–1
Romanija (II)	Zrinjski Mostar (I)	0–2
Grude (III)	Sloga Doboj (I)	0–7
Kruševo (III)	Borac Banja Luka (I)	2–2 (2–0 p)
Tekstilac Derventa (III)	ŠD Napredak (III)	4–1
Famos Hrasnica (III)	Jedinstvo Bihać (II)	1–0
Slatina (IV)	Slavija Sarajevo (II)	1–1 (1–3 p)
Stupčanica (II)	Leotar (II)	2–0
Čelik Zenica (II)	Posušje (I)	1–0
Sloboda Tuzla (II)	Željezničar (I)	0–2
Crni Vrh (III)	Radnik Bijeljina (I)	0–1

== Second round ==
Second round matches were played on 10, 11 and 12 February 2026.

Home team	Away team	Result
GOŠK Gabela (II)	Rudar Prijedor (I)	0–0 (5–4 p)
Sloga Doboj (I)	Tekstilac Derventa (III)	4–0
Zrinjski Mostar (I)	Stupčanica (II)	4–0
Radnik Bijeljina (I)	Kruševo (III)	5–1
Čelik Zenica (II)	Sarajevo (I)	0–1
Velež Mostar (I)	Široki Brijeg (I)	2–1
Famos Hrasnica (III)	Laktaši (II)	0–1
Željezničar (I)	Slavija Sarajevo (II)	4–0

== Quarter-finals ==
First legs were played on 25 February and 5 March, return legs were played on 10, 11 and 17 March 2026.

Team 1	Team 2	Leg 1	Leg 2	Agg. score
Laktaši (II)	Radnik Bijeljina (I)	2–0	0–4	2–4
Željezničar (I)	Sloga Doboj (I)	0–1	1–0	1–1 (4–5 p)
Sarajevo (I)	Velež Mostar (I)	0–1	1–4	1–5
GOŠK Gabela (II)	Zrinjski Mostar (I)	1–2	2–3	3–5

== Semi-finals ==
First legs were played on 8 April, return legs were played on 15 April 2026.

Team 1	Team 2	Leg 1	Leg 2	Agg. score
Radnik Bijeljina (I)	Zrinjski Mostar (I)	0–0	0–2	0–2
Velež Mostar (I)	Sloga Doboj (I)	3–1	3–0	6–1

== Final ==
First leg was played on 6 May, return leg was played on 13 May 2026.

Team 1	Team 2	Leg 1	Leg 2	Agg. score
Zrinjski Mostar (I)	Velež Mostar (I)	1–0	1–1	2–1

=== First leg ===
6 May 2026
18:00 CEST (UTC+2)

Zrinjski Mostar	1–0	Velež Mostar
Bilbija 38'	Report

Stadion pod Bijelim Brijegom, Mostar
Attendance: 7,200
Referee: Ermin Sivac (Zenica)

=== Second leg ===
13 May 2026
18:00 CEST (UTC+2)

Velež Mostar	1–1	Zrinjski Mostar
Spahić 90+6'	Report	Bilbija 4'

Stadion Rođeni, Mostar
Attendance: 6,600
Referee: Irfan Peljto (Sarajevo)
