= Supercup of Bosnia and Herzegovina =

Bosnia and Herzegovina football super cup game

- Organiser(s): N/FSBiH
- Founded: 1997; 2024 (reestablished)
- Region: Bosnia and Herzegovina
- Teams: 2
- Related competitions: Premier League (qualifier); Bosnian Cup (qualifier)
- Current champions: Zrinjski (2nd title)
- Most championships: Željezničar (3 titles)
- Broadcaster: Arena Sport
- 2025 Supercup

The Supercup of Bosnia and Herzegovina (Bosnian: Superkup Bosne i Hercegovine; Croatian: Superkup Bosne i Hercegovine; Serbian Cyrillic: Суперкуп Босне и Херцеговине) is Bosnia and Herzegovina football's annual match contested between the champions of the previous Bosnian Premier League season and the holders of the Bosnian Cup.

If the Premier League champions also win the cup, then the league runners-up provide the opposition. It was first contested in the 1996–97 season, but was abolished after the 2000–01 season. The supercup was revamped following the end of the 2023–24 season.

== Winners ==
Year	Winners	Result	Runners-up
1997	Sarajevo (1)	2–0, 1–3; Agg. 3–3 (a)	Čelik
1998	Željezničar (1)	4–0	Sarajevo
1999	Bosna Visoko (1)	2–2; 5–4 (pen.)	Sarajevo
2000	Željezničar (2)	0–0, 3–1; Agg. 3–1 (a)	Brotnjo
2001	Željezničar (3) won the Double.		
2002–2023	Not held.		
2024	Zrinjski (1)	1–0	Borac
2025	Zrinjski (2)	0–0; 4–1 (pen.)	Sarajevo

== Performance by club ==
Club	Winners	Runners-up	Winning years	Runners-up years
Željezničar	3	0	1998, 2000, 2001	—
Zrinjski	2	0	2024, 2025	—
Sarajevo	1	3	1997	1998, 1999, 2025
Bosna Visoko	1	0	1999	—
Čelik	0	1	—	1997
Brotnjo	0	1	—	2000
Borac	0	1	—	2024
