= Muamer Hamzić =

Bosnian footballer

Personal information
- Date of birth: 15 August 2005 (age 21)
- Place of birth: Doboj, Bosnia and Herzegovina
- Position: Defensive midfielder

Team information
- Current team: Travnik

Youth career
- 2016–2022: Tekstilac Derventa
- 2022–2024: Sarajevo

Senior career*
Years	Team	Apps	(Gls)
2024–2026	Sarajevo	5	(0)
2024	→ Čelik Zenica (loan)	13	(1)
2025–2026	Radnik Hadžići	30	(0)
2026–	Travnik	0	(0)

International career
2023–2024	Bosnia and Herzegovina U19	12	(1)
2024–2025	Bosnia and Herzegovina U21	5	(0)
- * Club domestic league appearances and goals as of 7 June 2026

Muamer Hamzić (born 15 August 2005) is a Bosnian professional footballer who plays as a defensive midfielder for First League of FBiH club Travnik. He came through Sarajevo's youth academy and has also played on loan for Čelik Zenica. He has featured for Bosnia and Herzegovina at youth international level.

== Club career ==
=== Sarajevo ===
Hamzić joined the FK Sarajevo youth setup in summer 2022, arriving from local club Tekstilac Derventa. He progressed through the juniors, winning two national youth titles and featuring in the UEFA Youth League, where he scored twice and provided an assist in two matches, helping Sarajevo qualify for the third round.

On 1 July 2024, Hamzić signed a professional contract with Sarajevo. He made his senior debut that season, featuring off the bench in a UEFA Conference League match versus FC Aktobe and in the domestic league under coach Zoran Zekić.

In October 2024, he extended his contract through 2028 following strong performances at youth level and the first-team impact.

=== Loan to Čelik Zenica ===
On 10 February 2024, Hamzić moved on loan to NK Čelik Zenica for the remainder of the season. He played primarily as a defensive midfielder and also covered as a centre-back, making 24 league appearances and scoring one goal. He also featured regularly in the youth ranks, with 38 U19 appearances, five goals, and two assists recorded before his loan.

=== Return to Sarajevo ===
In June 2024, Hamzić returned from loan to Sarajevo.

== International career ==
Hamzić regularly featured for the Bosnia and Herzegovina U19 team. He received his first call-up to the Bosnia and Herzegovina U21 team in November 2024 ahead of a friendly against Bulgaria.

== Career statistics ==
=== Club ===
As of match played 7 June 2026

Appearances and goals by club, season and competition
Club	Season	League			National cup (Note: Includes Bosnian Cup)		Continental		Total	
Club	Season	Division	Apps	Goals	Apps	Goals	Apps	Goals	Apps	Goals
Tekstilac Derventa	2021–22	First League of RS	20	1	—		—		20	1
Čelik Zenica (loan)	2023–24	First League of FBiH	13	1	—		—		13	1
Sarajevo	2024–25	Bosnian Premier League	3	0	1	0	2 (Note: Appearances in UEFA Conference League)	0	6	0
Sarajevo	2025–26	Bosnian Premier League	2	0	0	0	0	0	2	0
Sarajevo	Total		5	0	1	0	2	0	8	0
Radnik Hadžići	2024–25	First League of FBiH	11	0	—		—		11	0
Radnik Hadžići	2025–26	First League of FBiH	19	0	—		—		19	0
Radnik Hadžići	Total		30	0	—		—		30	0
Career total			68	2	1	0	2	0	71	2

== Honours ==
Sarajevo

- Bosnian Cup: 2024–25
