= Karlo Butić =

Croatian footballer

Personal information
- Date of birth: 21 August 1998 (age 28)
- Place of birth: Zadar, Croatia
- Height: 1.87 m (6 ft 2 in)
- Position: Forward

Team information
- Current team: Bari
- Number: 7

Youth career
- –2009: NK Škabrnja
- 2009–2015: Zadar
- 2009–2010: → NK Škabrnja (loan)
- 2016–2017: Inter
- 2017–2018: Torino

Senior career*
| Years | Team | Apps | (Gls) |
| 2015–2016 | Zadar | 28 | (6) |
| 2018–2020 | Torino | 0 | (0) |
| 2018–2019 | → Ternana (loan) | 13 | (0) |
| 2019 | → Arezzo (loan) | 6 | (0) |
| 2019–2020 | → Cesena (loan) | 27 | (10) |
| 2020–2023 | Pordenone | 53 | (8) |
| 2022–2023 | → Cosenza (loan) | 13 | (1) |
| 2023–2024 | Feralpisalò | 46 | (8) |
| 2024–2025 | Slaven Belupo | 11 | (1) |
| 2025 | Sarajevo | 18 | (3) |
| 2026 | Casertana | 14 | (6) |
| 2026– | Bari | 1 | (0) |
- * Club domestic league appearances and goals as of 28 August 2026

Karlo Butić (born 21 August 1998) is a Croatian professional footballer who plays as a forward for Serie C Group C club Bari.

== Club career ==
=== Inter Milan ===
After making his debut in the Croatian second tier for his hometown club Zadar in the 2015–16 season at the age of 16, he joined Italian club Inter Milan, where he was assigned to the Under-19 team. He won the Campionato Nazionale Primavera with the team. He also was the top scorer of the 2017 Torneo di Viareggio with 6 goals.

=== Torino ===
For the 2017–18 season, he joined another Italian club Torino, again being assigned to the Under-19 team. He won the Coppa Italia Primavera with the squad and also became the team's best scorer of the season with 20 goals. He was called up for the main squad on several occasions in March and April 2018 for Serie A games, but did not see any playing time.

==== Loan to Ternana ====
On 27 August 2018, he joined Serie C club Ternana on loan for the 2018–19 season. He made his Serie C debut for Ternana on 30 September 2018 in a game against Vis Pesaro as a 70th-minute substitute for Guido Marilungo.

==== Loan to Arezzo ====
On 31 January 2019, he was loaned to Arezzo.

==== Loan to Cesena ====
On 18 July 2019, Butić joined Serie C side Cesena on loan until 30 June 2020.

=== Pordenone ===
On 1 September 2020, he signed a three-year contract with Serie B club Pordenone.

Butić played regularly in his first season, collecting 31 appearances and scoring four goals, one of which helped Pordenone gain a 2–0 home win against Cosenza in the last league fixture, as the club consequently secured his permanence in the second tier. Following his good performances, Butić reached an agreement with Pordenone to extend his contract until 2024.

==== Loan to Cosenza ====
On 18 July 2022, Butić moved on loan to Cosenza with a conditional obligation to buy.

=== Feralpisalò ===
On 13 January 2023, Butić signed a two-and-a-half-year contract with Feralpisalò.

== Career statistics ==
=== Club ===
As of match played 14 December 2025

Appearances and goals by club, season and competition
| Club | Season | League | | | National cup (Note: Includes Croatian Cup, Coppa Italia Serie C, Coppa Italia, Bosnia and Herzegovina Cup) | | Continental | | Total | |
| Club | Season | Division | Apps | Goals | Apps | Goals | Apps | Goals | Apps | Goals |
|---|---|---|---|---|---|---|---|---|---|---|
| Zadar | 2015–16 | 2. HNL | 28 | 6 | 1 | 0 | — | | 29 | 6 |
| Torino | 2017–18 | Serie A | 0 | 0 | 0 | 0 | — | | 0 | 0 |
| Ternana (loan) | 2018–19 | Serie C | 13 | 0 | 0 | 0 | — | | 13 | 0 |
| Arezzo (loan) | 2018–19 | Serie C | 6 | 0 | — | | — | | 6 | 0 |
| Cesena (loan) | 2019–20 | Serie C | 27 | 10 | 2 | 1 | — | | 29 | 11 |
| Pordenone | 2020–21 | Serie B | 29 | 3 | 2 | 1 | — | | 31 | 4 |
| Pordenone | 2021–22 | Serie B | 24 | 5 | 1 | 0 | — | | 25 | 5 |
| Pordenone | Total | | 53 | 8 | 3 | 1 | — | | 56 | 9 |
| Cesena (loan) | 2022–23 | Serie B | 13 | 1 | 1 | 0 | — | | 14 | 1 |
| Feralpisalò | 2022–23 | Serie C | 14 | 3 | — | | — | | 14 | 3 |
| Feralpisalò | 2023–24 | Serie B | 32 | 5 | 0 | 0 | — | | 32 | 5 |
| Feralpisalò | Total | | 46 | 8 | 0 | 0 | — | | 46 | 8 |
| Slaven Belupo | 2024–25 | Croatian Football League | 11 | 1 | 1 | 0 | — | | 12 | 1 |
| Sarajevo | 2024–25 | Bosnian Premier League | 6 | 1 | 4 | 0 | — | | 10 | 1 |
| Sarajevo | 2025–26 | Bosnian Premier League | 12 | 2 | 0 | 0 | 0 | 0 | 12 | 2 |
| Sarajevo | Total | | 18 | 3 | 4 | 0 | 0 | 0 | 22 | 3 |
| Career total | | | 215 | 37 | 12 | 2 | 0 | 0 | 227 | 39 |

== Honours ==
Sarajevo

- Bosnian Cup: 2024–25
