= 2024–25 FK Sarajevo season =

Sarajevo
2024–25 season
- Owner: Vincent Tan (49.13%); Ismir Mirvić (49.13%)
- President: Ismir Mirvić
- Manager: Zoran Zekić
- Stadium: Asim Ferhatović Hase Stadium
- Bosnian Premier League: 3rd
- Bosnian Cup: Winners
- UEFA Conference League: Second qualifying round
- Top goalscorer: League: Giorgi Guliashvili (16); All: Giorgi Guliashvili (21)
- Highest home attendance: 26,756 vs Spartak Trnava (25 July 2024)
- Lowest home attendance: 2,000 vs Igman (29 March 2025)
- Average home league attendance: 6,613
- Biggest win: Sloboda 0–6 Sarajevo (2 November 2024)
- Biggest defeat: Spartak Trnava 3–0 Sarajevo (31 July 2024)
Home colours	Away colours	Third colours

The 2024–25 Sarajevo season was the club's 76th season in history, and their 31st consecutive season in the top flight of Bosnian football, the Bosnian Premier League. Besides competing in the Premier League, the team also competed in the National Cup and the qualifications for the UEFA Conference League. In this season Sarajevo won the Bosnian cup title.

== Squad information ==
=== First-team squad ===
Note: Flags indicate national team as defined under FIFA eligibility rules; some limited exceptions apply. Players may hold more than one non-FIFA nationality.

No.	Pos.	Nation	Player
2	DF	CRO	Bruno Unušić
3	DF	BIH	Renato Gojković
4	DF	BIH	Nermin Mujkić
5	MF	CRO	Karlo Lulić (on loan from Bari)
6	DF	CRO	Vinko Soldo (5th captain)
7	FW	GEO	Giorgi Guliashvili (captain)
8	MF	BIH	Eldar Mehmedović
9	FW	BIH	Aldin Turkeš
10	MF	LUX	Mirza Mustafić (3rd captain)
11	FW	GHA	Francis Kyeremeh
13	GK	BIH	Sanin Mušija
14	MF	SRB	Aleksandar Đorđević
15	DF	BIH	Nikola Đurić
16	DF	SRB	Filip Jović

No.	Pos.	Nation	Player
17	FW	CRO	Karlo Butić
18	MF	CRO	Domagoj Pavičić (on loan from Aris)
19	FW	SRB	Andreja Ristić
20	MF	CRO	Ivan Jelić Balta
22	DF	BIH	Amar Beganović (vice-captain)
23	MF	BIH	Anes Krdžalić
25	DF	BIH	Tarik Kapetanović
27	MF	BIH	Muamer Hamzić
29	MF	MNE	Vladan Bubanja (4th captain)
39	GK	CRO	Lovre Rogić
42	GK	SRB	Emil Rockov
44	DF	BUL	Martin Paskalev
46	FW	GEO	Vasilios Gordeziani (on loan from Dinamo Tbilisi)
77	DF	CRO	Mihael Kuprešak

=== Youth academy players ===
FK Sarajevo Academy players that received a first-team squad call-up.

No.	Pos.	Nation	Player
21	MF	GAM	Momodou Jatta
24	MF	BIH	Sergej Ignatkov
31	FW	BIH	Ahmed Tiro

No.	Pos.	Nation	Player
32	MF	BIH	Amar Cerić
40	GK	BIH	Faris Mehić
55	MF	BIH	Kenan Vrban

=== Coaching staff ===
Position	Name
Head coach	(Croatia) Zoran Zekić
Assistant coaches	(Croatia) Želimir Mešnjak
Assistant coaches	(Croatia) Mario Kuić
Goalkeeping coach	(Croatia) Domagoj Malovan
Fitness coach	(Croatia) Marko Matijević
Video analyst	(Croatia) Luka Šarlija
Doctors	(Bosnia and Herzegovina) Dr. Reuf Karabeg
Doctors	(Bosnia and Herzegovina) Dr. Arman Pindžo
Doctors	(Bosnia and Herzegovina) Dr. Benjamin Kaknjašević
Physiotherapists	(Bosnia and Herzegovina) Ismar Hadžibajrić
Physiotherapists	(Bosnia and Herzegovina) Mirza Marevac
Physiotherapists	(Bosnia and Herzegovina) Eldin Jarović
Technical staff manager	(Bosnia and Herzegovina) Mustafa Beridan
Equipment manager	(Bosnia and Herzegovina) Nermin Huskić

== Transfers ==
=== In ===
Date	Pos.	Player	From	Fee	Ref.
19 June 2024	GK	(Serbia) Emil Rockov	(Hungary) Fehérvár	Free transfer	
19 June 2024	DF	(Serbia) Filip Jović	(Serbia) Radnik Surdulica	€70,000	
19 June 2024	MF	(Serbia) Aleksandar Đorđević	(Serbia) Železničar Pančevo	Free transfer	
22 June 2024	DF	(Bosnia and Herzegovina) Nermin Mujkić	(Bosnia and Herzegovina) Sloboda Tuzla	Free transfer	
25 June 2024	FW	(Serbia) Andreja Ristić	(Serbia) Radnički 1923	Free transfer	
28 June 2024	DF	(Croatia) Bruno Unušić	(Croatia) Zrinski Osječko 1664	Undisclosed	
2 July 2024	MF	(The Gambia) Momodou Jatta	(The Gambia) Banjul United	Free transfer	
2 July 2024	MF	(Montenegro) Vladan Bubanja	(Croatia) Lokomotiva Zagreb	Undisclosed	
19 July 2024	DF	(Croatia) Mihael Kuprešak	(Bosnia and Herzegovina) Široki Brijeg	Free transfer	
9 August 2024	FW	(Bosnia and Herzegovina) Aldin Turkeš	(Switzerland) Winterthur	Undisclosed	
22 January 2025	DF	(Bosnia and Herzegovina) Renato Gojković	(Israel) Maccabi Petah Tikva	Free transfer	
25 January 2025	DF	(Bosnia and Herzegovina) Nikola Đurić	(Bosnia and Herzegovina) Zvijezda 09	€50,000	
5 February 2025	DF	(Bulgaria) Martin Paskalev	(Bulgaria) Lokomotiv Plovdiv	Undisclosed	
6 February 2025	FW	(Croatia) Karlo Butić	(Croatia) Slaven Belupo	Undisclosed	
Total				€120,000	

=== Out ===
Date	Pos.	Player	To	Fee	Ref.
10 June 2024	DF	(Bosnia and Herzegovina) Marin Aničić	Retired		
11 June 2024	DF	(Serbia) Slaviša Radović	(Azerbaijan) Sumgayit	End of contract	
14 June 2024	MF	(Bosnia and Herzegovina) Haris Duljević	Free agent	End of contract	
17 June 2024	GK	(North Macedonia) Dejan Iliev	(Romania) UTA Arad	End of contract	
28 June 2024	DF	(Bosnia and Herzegovina) Samir Zeljković	(Serbia) Radnički 1923	Contract termination	
29 July 2024	MF	(Bosnia and Herzegovina) Muhamed Buljubašić	(Turkey) Çaykur Rizespor	€1,500,000	
2 August 2024	MF	(Bosnia and Herzegovina) Talha Tabaković	(Bosnia and Herzegovina) Čelik Zenica	Contract termination	
4 August 2024	FW	(Bosnia and Herzegovina) Seid Pramenković	(Slovenia) Svoboda Ljubljana	Contract termination	
23 August 2024	FW	(Bosnia and Herzegovina) Hamza Čataković	(Turkey) Esenler Erokspor	€300,000	
1 September 2024	DF	(Bosnia and Herzegovina) Enedin Mulalić	(Bosnia and Herzegovina) Sloboda Tuzla	Contract termination	
11 January 2025	MF	(Montenegro) Miomir Đuričković	(Uzbekistan) Andijon	Contract termination	
13 January 2025	MF	(Bosnia and Herzegovina) Nemanja Anđušić	(Bosnia and Herzegovina) Radnik Bijeljina	Contract termination	
16 January 2025	DF	(Bosnia and Herzegovina) Muharem Trako	(Bosnia and Herzegovina) Stupčanica Olovo	Contract termination	
31 January 2025	DF	(Bosnia and Herzegovina) Elnes Alajmović	(Bosnia and Herzegovina) Budućnost Banovići	Contract termination	
3 February 2025	DF	(Bosnia and Herzegovina) Nidal Čelik	(France) Lens	€2,500,000	
Total				€4,300,000	

=== Loans in ===
Start date	End date	Pos.	Player	From	Ref.
6 September 2024	End of season	MF	(Croatia) Domagoj Pavičić	(Greece) Aris Thessaloniki	
6 September 2024	End of season	MF	(Croatia) Karlo Lulić	(Italy) Bari	
3 February 2025	End of season	FW	(Georgia (country)) Vasilios Gordeziani	(Georgia (country)) Dinamo Tbilisi	

=== Loans out ===
Start date	End date	Pos.	Player	To	Ref.
1 January 2024	31 December 2024	MF	(Bosnia and Herzegovina) Haris Ališah	(United States) Sporting Kansas City II	
24 January 2024	31 December 2024	DF	(Bosnia and Herzegovina) Besim Šerbečić	(Serbia) Radnički 1923	
16 February 2024	31 December 2024	MF	(Croatia) Ivan Jelić Balta	(Croatia) Slaven Belupo	
11 July 2024	End of season	FW	(Colombia) Kevin Viveros (Note: FK Sarajevo received a loan fee of €138,000)	(Colombia) Atlético Nacional	
25 July 2024	End of season	FW	(Venezuela) Adalberto Peñaranda (Note: FK Sarajevo received a loan fee of €100,000)	(Colombia) Atlético Bucaramanga	
4 August 2024	End of season	MF	(Bosnia and Herzegovina) Bakir Nurković	(Bosnia and Herzegovina) Igman Konjic	
3 September 2024	End of season	MF	(Croatia) Edin Julardžija	(Slovenia) Mura	
4 September 2024	End of season	MF	(Montenegro) Marko Matanović	(Hungary) Kisvárda	
4 September 2024	31 December 2024	DF	(Bosnia and Herzegovina) Muharem Trako	(Bosnia and Herzegovina) Tuzla City	
10 January 2025	End of season	DF	(Bosnia and Herzegovina) Elvir Duraković	(Croatia) Šibenik	
20 January 2025	End of season	FW	(Brazil) Renan Oliveira	(Colombia) La Equidad	

== Kit ==
Supplier	Sponsors	
(Germany) Adidas	(Turkey) Turkish Airlines	Front
(Germany) Adidas	(Bosnia and Herzegovina) Visit Sarajevo (Bosnia and Herzegovina) MeridianBet (Bosnia and Herzegovina) BH Telecom	Back
(Germany) Adidas	(Poland) R-GOL.com	Shoulder
(Germany) Adidas	(Bosnia and Herzegovina) AC BLOK	Sleeves
(Germany) Adidas	(Bosnia and Herzegovina) ASA Central Osiguranje	Shorts

== Pre-season and friendlies ==
Win Draw Loss Fixtures

28 June 2024 Friendly	Sarajevo (Bosnia and Herzegovina)	3–1	(Romania) UTA Arad	Rogla, Slovenia
17:30 CEST (UTC+2)	Čataković 57'; Beganović 68'; Anđušić 79' (pen.)	Report	Conté 34'

29 June 2024 Friendly	Shakhtar Donetsk (Ukraine)	4–1	(Bosnia and Herzegovina) Sarajevo	Radomlje, Slovenia
17:30 CEST (UTC+2)	Sikan 12'; Kryskiv 32'; Traoré 67' (pen.); Eguinaldo 84'	Report	Oliveira 51'	Stadium: Radomlje Sports Park; Attendance: 100

2 July 2024 Friendly	Olimpija Ljubljana (Slovenia)	1–0	(Bosnia and Herzegovina) Sarajevo	Ljubljana, Slovenia
18:00 CEST (UTC+2)	Dvoršak 80'	Report	Đuričković (red card) 90'	Stadium: Kodeljevo Sports Park

21 August 2024 Friendly	Sarajevo (Bosnia and Herzegovina)	2–2	(Bosnia and Herzegovina) Radnik Hadžići	Butmir
	Mehmedović 38'; Duraković 79'	Report	Bijelonja 40'; Pločo 74'	Stadium: Butmir Training Centre

7 September 2024 Friendly	Sarajevo (Bosnia and Herzegovina)	4–0	(Bosnia and Herzegovina) Radnički Lukavac	Butmir
	Oliveira 13', 16'; Koso 62'; Anđušić 90'	Report		Stadium: Butmir Training Centre

14 October 2024 Charity match (Note: The charity match against UNIS was played on 14 October 2024 to raise funds to help the affected areas of 2024 Bosnia and Herzegovina floods.)	UNIS Vogošća (Bosnia and Herzegovina)	0–4	(Bosnia and Herzegovina) Sarajevo	Vogošća
16:00 CEST (UTC+2)		Report	Jović 6'; Beganović 25'; Turkeš 27'; Oliveira 54'	Stadium: Hakija Mršo Stadium; Attendance: 1,000; Referee: Elmir Pilav

14 January 2025 Friendly	Sarajevo (Bosnia and Herzegovina)	0–0	(Bosnia and Herzegovina) GOŠK Gabela	Međugorje
13:30 CET (UTC+1)		Report

21 January 2025 Friendly	Sarajevo (Bosnia and Herzegovina)	1–0	(Czech Republic) Slovácko	Rovinj, Croatia
14:00 CET (UTC+1)	Guliashvili 71'	Report		Stadium: Valbruna Stadium

25 January 2025 Friendly	Sarajevo (Bosnia and Herzegovina)	1–2	(Slovenia) Koper	Rovinj, Croatia
13:30 CET (UTC+1)	Guliashvili 37'	Report	Jurić 56', 74' (pen.)	Stadium: Valbruna Stadium

29 January 2025 Friendly	Sarajevo (Bosnia and Herzegovina)	1–2	(North Macedonia) Gostivari	Rovinj, Croatia
10:30 CET (UTC+1)	Mustafić 7'	Report	Mbende 55'; Simonovski 57'	Stadium: Valbruna training ground

29 January 2025 Friendly	Opatija (Croatia)	0–3	(Bosnia and Herzegovina) Sarajevo	Rovinj, Croatia
14:00 CET (UTC+1)		Report	Guliashvili 9' (pen.); Čelik 26'; Soldo 72'	Stadium: Valbruna Stadium

2 February 2025 Friendly	Sarajevo (Bosnia and Herzegovina)	1–1	Croatia Zmijavci	Sarajevo
15:00 CET (UTC+1)	Guliashvili 87'	Report	Krizmanić 73' (pen.)	Stadium: Asim Ferhatović Hase Stadium

13 February 2025 Friendly	Sarajevo (Bosnia and Herzegovina)	4–1	(Bosnia and Herzegovina) Radnik Hadžići	Sarajevo
13:00 CET (UTC+1)	Gordeziani; Butić; Vrban	Report		Stadium: Asim Ferhatović Hase Stadium; Attendance: 0

== Competitions ==
=== Overview ===
Competition	First match	Last match	Starting round	Final position	Record							
Competition	First match	Last match	Starting round	Final position	Pld	W	D	L	GF	GA	GD	Win %
Bosnian Premier League	4 August 2024	31 May 2025	Matchday 1	3rd	33	18	11	4	59	24	+35	54.55
Bosnian Cup	30 October 2024	14 May 2025	First round	Winners	8	5	2	1	14	3	+11	62.50
Conference League	11 July 2024	31 July 2024	First qualifying round	Second qualifying round	4	1	1	2	3	6	−3	25.00
Total					45	24	14	7	76	33	+43	53.33

Source: Competitions

=== Premier League of Bosnia and Herzegovina ===
==== League table ====
Pos	Team	Pld	W	D	L	GF	GA	GD	Pts	Qualification or relegation
1	Zrinjski Mostar (C)	33	26	4	3	74	17	+57	82	Qualification for the Champions League first qualifying round
2	Borac Banja Luka	33	26	3	4	58	13	+45	81	Qualification to Conference League first qualifying round
3	Sarajevo	33	18	11	4	59	24	+35	65	Qualification to Conference League second qualifying round (Note: Since the winners of the 2024–25 Bosnian Cup, Sarajevo, finished in the top three of the Premier League, the remaining Conference League first qualifying round spot was passed to the fourth-placed team.)
4	Željezničar	33	20	5	8	55	38	+17	65	Qualification to Conference League first qualifying round
5	Široki Brijeg	33	13	7	13	43	46	−3	46	

Source: Rezultati.com
Rules for classification: 1) Points; 2) Goal difference; 3) Goals scored; 4) Head-to-head points; 5) Head-to-head goal difference; 6) Head-to-head away goals (only if two teams); 7) Head-to-head goals scored; 8) Goal difference; 9) Play-off. (Criteria 2 and 3 are not used to decide champion, UEFA competition qualification, or relegation)
(C) Champions

==== Results summary ====
Overall								Home						Away					
Pld	W	D	L	GF	GA	GD	Pts	W	D	L	GF	GA	GD	W	D	L	GF	GA	GD
33	18	11	4	59	24	+35	65	9	5	3	26	12	+14	9	6	1	33	12	+21

Source: Sportsport.ba

==== Results by round ====
Round	1	2	3	5	6	7	8	9	10	11	12	4^{1}	13	14	15	16	17	19	20	21	22	18^{2}	23	24	25	26	27	28	29	30	31	32	33
Ground	H	A	H	H	H	A	H	A	H	A	A	A	H	A	H	A	A	A	H	A	H	H	H	A	H	A	H	H	A	H	A	H	A
Result	W	W	W	W	D	W	D	D	W	W	W	D	W	W	L	W	D	D	W	D	W	L	W	W	D	L	D	W	W	L	D	D	W
Position	1	1	1	1	1	1	1	2	3	3	2	2	2	2	3	3	2	3	3	3	3	3	3	3	3	3	3	3	3	3	3	3	3
Points	3	6	9	12	13	16	17	18	21	24	27	28	31	34	34	37	38	39	42	43	46	46	49	52	53	53	54	57	60	60	61	62	65

Source: Competitions
A = Away; H = Home; W = Win; D = Draw; L = Loss

^{1} Matchday 4 (vs Zrinjski) was postponed due to Zrinjski's participation in the UEFA Conference League play-off round.
^{2} Matchday 18 (vs Borac) was postponed due to Borac's participation in the UEFA Conference League knockout phase play-offs.

==== Matches ====
4 August 2024 1	Sarajevo	3–1	Sloboda Tuzla	Sarajevo
21:00 CEST (UTC+2)	Jović (yellow card) 21'; Duraković (yellow card) 45+3'; Guliashvili 45+6' (pen.); Đorđević 58', (yellow card) 71'; Čataković 69' (pen.)	Report	Husejinović 21' (pen.); Beganović (yellow card) 33'; Osmanković (yellow card) 90+3'	Stadium: Asim Ferhatović Hase Stadium; Attendance: 8,500; Referee: Antoni Bandić (Grude)

12 August 2024 2	Sloga Doboj	1–3	Sarajevo	Doboj
17:30 CEST (UTC+2)	Grabež 42'	Report	Soldo 17'; Guliashvili 32', 34'; Đorđević (yellow card) 55'; Kuprešak (yellow card) 68' (yellow-red card) 90+2'	Stadium: Luke Stadium; Attendance: 1,000; Referee: Frano Jelić (Široki Brijeg)

19 August 2024 3	Sarajevo	3–1	GOŠK Gabela	Sarajevo
21:00 CEST (UTC+2)	Oliveira 41'; Guliashvili 45+3'; Čataković 69'	Report	Sipović (red card) 27'; Gogić (yellow card) 62'; Lagumdžija 71', (yellow card) 72'; Mandić (yellow card) 83'	Stadium: Asim Ferhatović Hase Stadium; Attendance: 6,000; Referee: Ermin Sivac (Zenica)

30 August 2024 5	Sarajevo	2–0	Radnik Soccerbet	Sarajevo
21:00 CEST (UTC+2)	Bubanja 10', (yellow card) 63'; Đorđević (yellow card) 34'; Turkeš 90+2'	Report	Krajišnik (yellow card) 58'	Stadium: Asim Ferhatović Hase Stadium; Attendance: 6,500; Referee: Elvedin Topuzović (Tuzla)
Note: Sarajevo assistant manager Mario Kuić was cautioned (yellow card) in the 73rd minute.

14 September 2024 6	Sarajevo	2–2	Posušje	Sarajevo
20:45 CEST (UTC+2)	Guliashvili 19'; Bubanja (yellow card) 64'; Soldo (yellow card) 65'; Pavičić 90+2'; Čelik (red card) 90+9'	Report	Begić (yellow card) 67'; Pavković (yellow card) 73'; Marić 79'; Čuljak (yellow card) 82'; Vrgoč 90+5'	Stadium: Asim Ferhatović Hase Stadium; Attendance: 5,100; Referee: Dražen Marić (Bijeljina)

21 September 2024 7	Borac Banja Luka	0–1	Sarajevo	Banja Luka
16:00 CEST (UTC+2)	Despotović (penalty missed) 2'; Nikolov (yellow card) 90+4'	Report	Lulić (yellow card) 9'; Guliashvili 14'; Soldo (yellow card) 38'; Đuričković (yellow card) 41'; Jović (yellow card) 76'; Mustafić (yellow card) 85'	Stadium: Banja Luka City Stadium; Attendance: 3,500; Referee: Frano Jelić (Široki Brijeg)
Note: Sarajevo assistant manager Želimir Mešnjak and the head of security Zlatan Čakal were cautioned (yellow card) in the 26th minute. Sarajevo assistant manager Mario Kuić was cautioned (yellow card) in the 95th minute.

25 September 2024 8	Sarajevo	1–1	Željezničar	Sarajevo
20:30 CEST (UTC+2)	Jović (yellow card) 26'; Soldo 61'; Mehmedović (yellow card) 68'	Report	Krpić (yellow card) 18'; Boljević 42'; Cavnić (yellow card) 52'; Karić (yellow card) 90+4'; Muftić (yellow card) 90+7'	Stadium: Asim Ferhatović Hase Stadium; Attendance: 24,000; Referee: Admir Musić (Hrasnica)

30 September 2024 9	Široki Brijeg	3–3	Sarajevo	Široki Brijeg
18:00 CEST (UTC+2)	Stanić 12' (pen.); Ćorić (yellow card) 66'; Iličić 79'; Pranjić (yellow card) 80'; Matić 86'	Report	Guliashvili 44' (pen.), 48'; Turkeš (yellow card) 78'; Đorđević 84', (yellow card) 84'	Stadium: Stadion Pecara; Attendance: 1,500; Referee: Dragan Petrović (Banja Luka)
Note: Sarajevo assistant manager Želimir Mešnjak was cautioned (yellow card) in the 14th minute. Sarajevo physiotherapist Eldin Jarović was sent off (red card) in the 14th minute.

19 October 2024 (Note: Match of Round 10, scheduled for 7 October 2024, was postponed for 19 October due to a state of emergency caused by heavy floods.) 10	Sarajevo	4–0	Velež Mostar	Sarajevo
20:45 CEST (UTC+2)	Kyeremeh (red card) 20'; Turkeš 31'; Jović 36', (yellow card) 59'; Guliashvili 53'; Duraković (yellow card) 69'; Lulić 89'	Report	Oreč (red card) 27'; Mehremić (yellow card) 52'; Halilović (yellow card) 73'	Stadium: Asim Ferhatović Hase Stadium; Attendance: 6,500; Referee: Mirza Kazlagić (Cazin)
Note: Sarajevo assistant manager Mario Kuić was cautioned (yellow card) in the 25th minute.

27 October 2024 11	Igman Konjic	0–3	Sarajevo	Konjic
13:00 CET (UTC+1)		Report	Đuričković (yellow card) 12'; Velić 23' (o.g.); Lulić 25'; Bubanja 43', (yellow card) 60'	Stadium: Konjic City Stadium; Attendance: 3,000; Referee: Danijel Perić (Bijeljina)

2 November 2024 12	Sloboda Tuzla	0–6	Sarajevo	Tuzla
20:45 CET (UTC+1)	Kurtalić (yellow card) 61'	Report	Oliveira 12' (pen.), 56', (yellow card) 72'; Jović 32'; Lulić 43', 54'; Kyeremeh (yellow card) 48'; Guliashvili 76'; Duraković (yellow card) 82'	Stadium: Tušanj City Stadium; Attendance: 1,500; Referee: Antoni Bandić (Grude)

6 November 2024 4 (Note: Match of Round 4 postponed because of Zrinjski's participation in the UEFA Conference League play-off round.)	Zrinjski Mostar	1–1	Sarajevo	Mostar
18:00 CET (UTC+1)	Mulahusejnović 13' (pen.); Šunjić (red card) 64'	Report	Đorđević 20'; Pavičić (yellow card) 90+4'	Stadium: Stadion pod Bijelim Brijegom; Attendance: 5,000; Referee: Ermin Sivac (Zenica)

9 November 2024 13	Sarajevo	2–0	Sloga Doboj	Sarajevo
16:00 CET (UTC+1)	Batar 30' (o.g.); Guliashvili (penalty missed) 33'; Oliveira (yellow card) 70'; Mustafić (yellow card) 79', (goal) 81'	Report	Batar (yellow card) 31'; Ovčina (yellow card) 62'	Stadium: Asim Ferhatović Hase Stadium; Attendance: 4,500; Referee: Josip Martinović (Čapljina)

24 November 2024 14	GOŠK Gabela	0–3	Sarajevo	Gabela
19:45 CET (UTC+1)	Gogić (yellow card) 20'; Perić (yellow card) 84'	Report	Jović (yellow card) 9'; Guliashvili 33'; Bubanja 62'; Kyeremeh 82'	Stadium: Stadium Perica-Pero Pavlović; Attendance: 300; Referee: Nemanja Aleksić (Banja Luka)

29 November 2024 15	Sarajevo	0–1	Zrinjski Mostar	Sarajevo
18:00 CET (UTC+1)	Čelik (yellow card) 74'; Kyeremeh (yellow card) 90+3'	Report	Mulahusejnović 56'; Topić (yellow card) 60'; Surdanović (yellow card) 63'; Malekinušić (yellow card) 90+1'	Stadium: Asim Ferhatović Hase Stadium; Attendance: 7,000; Referee: Aleksandar Njegomirović (Prnjavor)

3 December 2024 16	Radnik Soccerbet	2–3	Sarajevo	Bijeljina
16:00 CET (UTC+1)	Albijanić 18'; Vasić (yellow card) 50'; Jovanović 65'; Amidžić (yellow card) 90'; Perišić (yellow card) 90+3'	Report	Turkeš 35'; Bubanja 45'; Guliashvili 57'; Mustafić (yellow card) 68'; Čelik (yellow card) 75'; Kyeremeh (yellow card) 81'	Stadium: Bijeljina City Stadium; Attendance: 450; Referee: Antoni Bandić (Grude)
Note: Sarajevo manager Zoran Zekić was cautioned (yellow card) in the 48th minute.

7 December 2024 17	Posušje	0–0	Sarajevo	Posušje
13:00 CET (UTC+1)	Begić (yellow card) 39'; Boban (yellow card) 60'; Hanuljak (yellow card) 71'	Report	Bubanja (yellow card) 35'; Đuričković (yellow card) 41'; Beganović (yellow card) 56'; Jović (yellow card) 70'; Guliashvili (yellow card) 83'	Stadium: Mokri Dolac Stadium; Attendance: 700; Referee: Darko Gedžić (Brčko)
Note: Sarajevo assistant manager Želimir Mešnjak was cautioned (yellow card) in the 83rd minute. Sarajevo technical staff manager Mustafa Beridan was sent off (red card) after the match was finished.

22 February 2025 19	Željezničar	0–0	Sarajevo	Sarajevo
16:00 CET (UTC+1)	Cvetanoski (yellow card) 34'; Šukilović (yellow card) 52'; Lagumdžija (yellow card) 66'; Krpić (yellow card) 74'	Report	Beganović (yellow card) 17'; Guliashvili (yellow card) 35'; Soldo (yellow card) 36'; Gojković (yellow card) 90+1'	Stadium: Stadion Grbavica; Attendance: 12,500; Referee: Nihad Ljajić (Sarajevo)

2 March 2025 20	Sarajevo	1–0	Široki Brijeg	Sarajevo
19:45 CET (UTC+1)	Guliashvili 53'	Report	Tomić (yellow card) 44'; Senić (yellow card) 57'; Medić (yellow card) 68'	Stadium: Asim Ferhatović Hase Stadium; Attendance: 4,500; Referee: Ermin Sivac (Zenica)

8 March 2025 21	Velež Mostar	0–0	Sarajevo	Mostar
16:00 CET (UTC+1)	Ologo (red card) 45+1'; Đurić (yellow card) 81' (yellow-red card) 90+8'; Vehabović (yellow card) 82'	Report	Pavičić (yellow card) 38'; Mujkić (yellow card) 63'; Soldo (yellow card) 74'	Stadium: Stadion Rođeni; Attendance: 4,000; Referee: Irfan Peljto (Sarajevo)

15 March 2025 22	Sarajevo	2–1	Igman Konjic	Sarajevo
16:00 CET (UTC+1)	Gordeziani 44' (pen.); Guliashvili 59'	Report	Duranović (yellow card) 20'; Sadiki (yellow card) 28'; Bešagić 83' (pen.)	Stadium: Asim Ferhatović Hase Stadium; Attendance: 0 (Note: Match of Round 22 between Sarajevo and Igman Konjic on 15 March 2025 was played behind closed doors at the Asim Ferhatović Hase Stadium due to the Sarajevo Canton Ministry of the Interior denying the safety certificate, citing missing structural integrity reports required for spectator attendance.); Referee: Sabrija Topalović (Zenica)
Note: Sarajevo assistant manager Želimir Mešnjak was cautioned (yellow card) in the 90th minute.

26 March 2025 18 (Note: Match of Round 18 postponed because of Borac's participation in the UEFA Conference League knockout phase play-offs.)	Sarajevo	0–2	Borac Banja Luka	Sarajevo
21:00 CET (UTC+1)	Bubanja (yellow card) 5'; Unušić (yellow card) 75'	Report	Vuković 3' (pen.); Meijers (yellow card) 58'; Despotović 67'; Šiškovski (yellow card) 82'; Zorić (yellow card) 90+3'	Stadium: Asim Ferhatović Hase Stadium; Attendance: 3,500; Referee: Antonio Tomić (Kreševo)

29 March 2025 23	Sarajevo	3–0	Igman Konjic	Sarajevo
16:00 CET (UTC+1)	Butić 66' (pen.); Guliashvili 79', 82'; Paskalev (yellow card) 87'; Vrban (penalty missed) 90+2'	Report	Drljević (yellow card) 51'	Stadium: Asim Ferhatović Hase Stadium; Attendance: 2,000; Referee: Dražen Marić (Bijeljina)

5 April 2025 24	GOŠK Gabela	0–2	Sarajevo	Gabela
20:45 CEST (UTC+2)	Kaćunko (yellow card) 41'	Report	Mujkić (yellow card) 34'; Krešić 53' (o.g.); Kyeremeh 89'; Kuprešak (yellow card) 90+1'	Stadium: Stadium Perica-Pero Pavlović; Attendance: 250; Referee: Nemanja Aleksić (Banja Luka)

11 April 2025 25	Sarajevo	0–0	Zrinjski Mostar	Sarajevo
18:00 CEST (UTC+2)	Lulić (yellow card) 73'; Turkeš (yellow card) 90+4'	Report	Memija (yellow card) 77'	Stadium: Asim Ferhatović Hase Stadium; Attendance: 4,200; Referee: Luka Bilbija (Prijedor)

19 April 2025 26	Borac Banja Luka	2–0	Sarajevo	Banja Luka
20:45 CEST (UTC+2)	Kvržić 25' (pen.); Herrera (yellow card) 27'; Vuković 28'; Ogrinec (yellow card) 71'; Nikolov (yellow card) 87'; Vranješ (yellow card) 90+2'	Report	Beganović (yellow card) 16'; Jatta (yellow card) 23'; Jović (yellow card) 33'; Paskalev (yellow card) 37'; Soldo (yellow card) 84'; Mustafić (yellow card) 90'; Mehmedović (yellow card) 90+2'	Stadium: Banja Luka City Stadium; Attendance: 6,000; Referee: Mirza Kazlagić (Cazin)
Note: Sarajevo head of security Zlatan Čakal was cautioned (yellow card) in the 19th minute.

22 April 2025 27	Sarajevo	0–0	Sloboda Tuzla	Sarajevo
21:00 CEST (UTC+2)	Kyeremeh (yellow card) 68'	Report	Fai (yellow card) 20'; Džafić (yellow card) 60'; Hasanović (yellow card) 71'; Muminović (yellow card) 90+5'	Stadium: Asim Ferhatović Hase Stadium; Attendance: 2,700; Referee: Ernis Džemidžić (Goražde)

27 April 2025 28	Sarajevo	2–1	Željezničar	Sarajevo
15:00 CEST (UTC+2)	Kyeremeh 39'; Gordeziani 47' (pen.); Paskalev (yellow card) 53'; Mujkić (yellow card) 90+2'	Report	Cavnić (yellow card) 43'; Boljević 70'	Stadium: Asim Ferhatović Hase Stadium; Attendance: 14,000; Referee: Nihad Ljajić (Sarajevo)

3 May 2025 29	Sloga Doboj	0–4	Sarajevo	Doboj
13:30 CEST (UTC+2)	Ovčina (yellow card) 11'; Omić (yellow card) 73'	Report	Turkeš 9', 38', 68'; Jatta (yellow card) 14'; Mustafić (yellow card) 17'; Kyeremeh 53'	Stadium: Luke Stadium; Attendance: 500; Referee: Josip Martinović (Čapljina)

10 May 2025 30	Sarajevo	0–1	Široki Brijeg	Sarajevo
18:30 CEST (UTC+2)	Lulić (yellow card) 32'; Mustafić (yellow card) 57'; Soldo (yellow card) 69'	Report	Soldo 22' (o.g.); Bagarić (yellow card) 87'; Pranjić (yellow card) 89'	Stadium: Asim Ferhatović Hase Stadium; Attendance: 3,500; Referee: Dražen Marić (Bijeljina)
Note: Sarajevo technical staff manager Mustafa Beridan was cautioned (yellow card) in the 32nd minute.

18 May 2025 31	Velež Mostar	2–2	Sarajevo	Mostar
17:00 CEST (UTC+2)	Pidro 28'; Mlinarić 82'	Report	Turkeš 6'; Jović (yellow card) 12'; Pavičić 19', (yellow card) 40' (yellow-red card) 80'; Guliashvili (yellow card) 35'; Beganović (yellow card) 53' (yellow-red card) 55'; Bubanja (yellow card) 60'; Kuprešak (yellow card) 86'; Rogić (yellow card) 90+5'	Stadium: Stadion Rođeni; Attendance: 2,500; Referee: Haris Halkić (Sanski Most)
Note: Sarajevo manager Zoran Zekić and the assistant manager Želimir Mešnjak were cautioned (yellow card) in the 56th and 81st minute, respectively. Sarajevo technical staff manager Mustafa Beridan and the assistant manager Mario Kuić were sent off (red card) during the half-time. Sarajevo physiotherapist Eldin Jarović was sent off (red card) in the 56th minute.

25 May 2025 32	Sarajevo	1–1	Radnik Soccerbet	Sarajevo
15:00 CEST (UTC+2)	Kuprešak 2'; Mujkić (red card) 29'; Soldo (yellow card) 61'; Jović (yellow card) 71'	Report	Janjić 13'; Maričić (yellow card) 88'; Pekarić (yellow card) 90+3'	Stadium: Asim Ferhatović Hase Stadium; Attendance: 3,300; Referee: Josip Martinović (Čapljina)

31 May 2025 33	Posušje	1–2	Sarajevo	Posušje
17:00 CEST (UTC+2)	Čuljak 45+1'; Erick (yellow card) 65'	Report	Krdžalić 44'; Paskalev 78'	Stadium: Mokri Dolac Stadium; Attendance: 1,200; Referee: Irfan Peljto (Sarajevo)

=== Cup of Bosnia and Herzegovina ===
==== Round of 32 ====
30 October 2024	Sloboda Novi Grad	0–2	Sarajevo	Novi Grad
14:00 CET (UTC+1)	Zec (yellow card) 19'; Gavrić (yellow card) 23'; Isailović (yellow card) 33'	Report	Lokilo 26' (o.g.); Guliashvili (penalty missed) 33'; Turkeš 37'; Mehmedović (yellow card) 65'	Stadium: Mlakve Stadium; Attendance: 1,300; Referee: Miloš Gigović (Gradiška)

==== Round of 16 ====
9 February 2025	Sarajevo	3–1	Sloga Doboj	Sarajevo
15:15 CET (UTC+1)	Bubanja 17'; Guliashvili 27', 55', (penalty missed) 82'; Beganović (yellow card) 90+2'	Report	Dejanović (yellow card) 22'; Veselinović 31'; Jović (yellow card) 68'; Ristić (yellow card) 81'	Stadium: Asim Ferhatović Hase Stadium; Attendance: 8,500; Referee: Josip Martinović (Čapljina)

==== Quarter-finals ====
25 February 2025 First leg	Sarajevo	1–1	Zrinjski Mostar	Sarajevo
20:30 CET (UTC+1)	Bubanja (yellow card) 44'; Butić (yellow card) 45+4'; Beganović (yellow card) 53'; Guliashvili 68'; Soldo (yellow card) 86'; Lulić (yellow card) 86'	Report	Bilbija 36' (pen.); Memija (yellow card) 45+4'; Mašić (yellow card) 63'; Savić (yellow card) 80'; Malekinušić (yellow card) 86'	Stadium: Asim Ferhatović Hase Stadium; Attendance: 6,000; Referee: Luka Bilbija (Prijedor)

11 March 2025 Second leg	Zrinjski Mostar	0–1 (1–2 agg.)	Sarajevo	Mostar
17:30 CET (UTC+1)	Dujmović (yellow card) 51'; Savić (red card) 87'	Report	Guliashvili 16', (penalty missed) 36'; Paskalev (yellow card) 29'; Mujkić (yellow card) 55'; Pavičić (yellow card) 74'; Kyeremeh (yellow card) 84'; Mehmedović (yellow card) 90+1'	Stadium: Stadion pod Bijelim Brijegom; Attendance: 2,000; Referee: Aleksandar Njegomirović (Prnjavor)

==== Semi-finals ====
2 April 2025 First leg	Sarajevo	0–1	Borac Banja Luka	Sarajevo
20:30 CEST (UTC+2)		Report	Hiroš 30'; Shishkovski (yellow card) 69'; Čelić (yellow card) 85' (yellow-red card) 90+2'	Stadium: Asim Ferhatović Hase Stadium; Attendance: 4,000; Referee: Antoni Bandić (Grude)
Note: Sarajevo assistant manager Želimir Mešnjak was sent off (red card) in the 46th minute. Sarajevo assistant manager Mario Kuić was cautioned (yellow card) in the 80th minute.

15 April 2025 Second leg	Borac Banja Luka	0–2 (1–2 agg.)	Sarajevo	Banja Luka
17:30 CEST (UTC+2)	Vranješ (yellow card) 79'	Report	Paskalev (yellow card) 7'; Kyeremeh 18', (yellow card) 54'; Soldo (yellow card) 23'; Kuprešak (yellow card) 54' (yellow-red card) 79'; Krdžalić (yellow card) 60'; Beganović (yellow card) 64'; Pavičić 73'; Rogić (yellow card) 90+6'	Stadium: Banja Luka City Stadium; Attendance: 5,500; Referee: Antonio Tomić (Kreševo)
Note: Sarajevo representative Nermin Šabanović and the assistant manager Mario Kuić were cautioned (yellow card) in the 60th and the 67th minute, respectively. Sarajevo physiotherapists Enes Beganović and Eldin Jarović were sent off (red card) in the 74th and the 93rd minute, respectively.

==== Final ====
7 May 2025 First leg	Sarajevo	4–0	Široki Brijeg	Sarajevo
18:00 CEST (UTC+2)	Turkeš 4', 15'; Bubanja 54'; Taraba 63' (o.g.)	Report	Senić (yellow card) 57'	Stadium: Asim Ferhatović Hase Stadium; Attendance: 8.500; Referee: Luka Bilbija (Prijedor)

14 May 2025 Second leg	Široki Brijeg	1–1 (1–5 agg.)	Sarajevo	Široki Brijeg
21:00 CEST (UTC+2)	Stanić (yellow card) 17', (goal) 89'; Musa (yellow card) 77'	Report	Soldo (yellow card) 12'; Beganović (yellow card) 58'; Lulić 76', (yellow card) 77'	Stadium: Stadion Pecara; Attendance: 2,500; Referee: Ermin Sivac (Zenica)
Note: Sarajevo head of security Zlatan Čakal and the assistant manager Želimir Mešnjak were cautioned (yellow card) in the 14th and the 77th minute, respectively.

=== UEFA Conference League ===
==== First qualifying round ====
11 July 2024 First Leg	Aktobe (Kazakhstan)	0–1	(Bosnia and Herzegovina) Sarajevo	Aktobe, Kazakhstan
20:00 KZT (UTC+5)	Bessmertny (yellow card) 65'; Tanzharikov (yellow card) 80'	Report	Mustafić (yellow card) 24'; Anđušić (yellow card) 37'; Soldo (yellow card) 55'; Beganović (yellow card) 78'; Kyeremeh 90', (yellow card) 90+1'; Rogić (yellow card) 90'	Stadium: Central Stadium; Attendance: 12,400; Referee: Ivo Torres (Luxembourg)

18 July 2024 Second Leg	Sarajevo (Bosnia and Herzegovina)	2–3 (a.e.t.) (3–3 agg.) (4–3 p)	(Kazakhstan) Aktobe	Sarajevo, Bosnia and Herzegovina
21:00 CEST (UTC+2)	Đorđević (yellow card) 52'; Guliashvili 57'; Rockov (yellow card) 73'; Đuričković (yellow card) 79' (yellow-red card) 105+1'; Oliveira 96'; Soldo (yellow card) 120+1'	Report	Cevallos (yellow card) 26'; Umayev 41', (yellow card) 44'; Tanzharikov 75'; Jean 93'; Vătăjelu (yellow card) 116'; Umaniyazov (yellow card) 120+2'	Stadium: Asim Ferhatović Hase Stadium; Attendance: 21,667; Referee: Zorbay Küçük (Turkey)
	Penalties
	Anđušić (penalty missed); Mehmedović (penalty scored); Oliveira (penalty scored); Julardžija (penalty scored); Duraković (penalty scored)		(penalty missed) Romero; (penalty scored) Tanzharikov; (penalty scored) Jean; (penalty missed) Samorodov; (penalty scored) Kasym
Note: Sarajevo manager Zoran Zekić was cautioned (yellow card) in the 37th minute.

==== Second qualifying round ====
25 July 2024 First Leg	Sarajevo (Bosnia and Herzegovina)	0–0	(Slovakia) Spartak Trnava	Sarajevo, Bosnia and Herzegovina
21:00 CEST (UTC+2)	Bubanja (yellow card) 24'; Soldo (yellow card) 41'; Mehmedović (yellow card) 90+4'	Report	Procházka (yellow card) 44'	Stadium: Asim Ferhatović Hase Stadium; Attendance: 26,756; Referee: Bram Van Driessche (Belgium)

31 July 2024 Second Leg	Spartak Trnava (Slovakia)	3–0 (3–0 agg.)	(Bosnia and Herzegovina) Sarajevo	Trnava, Slovakia
20:30 CEST (UTC+2)	Ďuriš 15', 42'; Kóša (yellow card) 28'; Pich (yellow card) 80'; Karhan 90+4'	Report	Jović (yellow card) 46'; Julardžija (yellow card) 90+2'	Stadium: Anton Malatinský Stadium; Attendance: 9,120; Referee: Sandi Putros (Denmark)

== Statistics ==
=== Appearances and goals ===
No.	Pos	Nat	Player	Total		Bosnian Premier League		Bosnian Cup		Conference League	
No.	Pos	Nat	Player	Apps	Goals	Apps	Goals	Apps	Goals	Apps	Goals
Goalkeepers
13	GK	(Bosnia and Herzegovina) BIH	Sanin Mušija	0	0	0	0	0	0	0	0
39	GK	(Croatia) CRO	Lovre Rogić	31	0	23	0	8	0	0	0
40	GK	(Bosnia and Herzegovina) BIH	Faris Mehić	0	0	0	0	0	0	0	0
42	GK	(Serbia) SRB	Emil Rockov	14	0	10	0	0	0	4	0
Defenders
2/28 (Note: Bruno Unušić began the season wearing the number 28 jersey. From the Round of 16 of the Bosnian Cup, in the match against Sloga Doboj on 9 February 2025, his squad number was changed to 2.)	DF	(Croatia) CRO	Bruno Unušić	31	0	12+12	0	3+3	0	0+1	0
3	DF	(Bosnia and Herzegovina) BIH	Renato Gojković	8	0	5	0	3	0	0	0
4	DF	(Bosnia and Herzegovina) BIH	Nermin Mujkić	24	0	13+4	0	6+1	0	0	0
6/24 (Note: Vinko Soldo began the season wearing the number 24 jersey. From Round 5 of the Bosnian Premier League, in the match against Radnik Bijeljina on 30 August 2024, his squad number was changed to 6.)	DF	(Croatia) CRO	Vinko Soldo	38	2	26+3	2	6	0	3	0
15	DF	(Bosnia and Herzegovina) BIH	Nikola Đurić	0	0	0	0	0	0	0	0
16	DF	(Serbia) SRB	Filip Jović	32	2	19+5	2	4	0	4	0
22	DF	(Bosnia and Herzegovina) BIH	Amar Beganović	38	0	27+1	0	5+1	0	4	0
25	DF	(Bosnia and Herzegovina) BIH	Tarik Kapetanović	3	0	2+1	0	0	0	0	0
44	DF	(Bulgaria) BUL	Martin Paskalev	18	1	10+3	1	5	0	0	0
77	DF	(Croatia) CRO	Mihael Kuprešak	30	1	16+6	1	6+1	0	0+1	0
Midfielders
5	MF	(Croatia) CRO	Karlo Lulić	34	5	18+8	4	3+5	1	0	0
8	MF	(Bosnia and Herzegovina) BIH	Eldar Mehmedović	27	0	4+13	0	2+4	0	1+3	0
10	MF	(Luxembourg) LUX	Mirza Mustafić	31	1	12+12	1	1+5	0	1	0
14	MF	(Serbia) SRB	Aleksandar Đorđević	15	3	11	3	0	0	4	0
18	MF	(Croatia) CRO	Domagoj Pavičić	32	3	17+8	2	7	1	0	0
20	MF	(Croatia) CRO	Ivan Jelić Balta	7	0	1+4	0	1+1	0	0	0
21	MF	(The Gambia) GAM	Momodou Jatta	11	0	5+3	0	3	0	0	0
23	MF	(Bosnia and Herzegovina) BIH	Anes Krdžalić	13	1	6+4	1	0+3	0	0	0
24	MF	(Bosnia and Herzegovina) BIH	Sergej Ignatkov	0	0	0	0	0	0	0	0
29	MF	(Montenegro) MNE	Vladan Bubanja	40	6	26+2	4	8	2	4	0
27	MF	(Bosnia and Herzegovina) BIH	Muamer Hamzić	6	0	1+2	0	0+1	0	0+2	0
32	MF	(Bosnia and Herzegovina) BIH	Amar Cerić	0	0	0	0	0	0	0	0
55	MF	(Bosnia and Herzegovina) BIH	Kenan Vrban	6	0	0+5	0	0+1	0	0	0
Forwards
7/17 (Note: Giorgi Guliashvili began the season wearing the number 17 jersey. From Round 5 of the Bosnian Premier League, in the match against Radnik Bijeljina on 30 August 2024, his squad number was changed to 7.)	FW	(Georgia (country)) GEO	Giorgi Guliashvili	37	21	25+1	16	5+2	4	3+1	1
9/99 (Note: Aldin Turkeš began the season wearing the number 99 jersey. From the Round of 16 of the Bosnian Cup, in the match against Sloga Doboj on 9 February 2025, his squad number was changed to 9.)	FW	(Bosnia and Herzegovina) BIH	Aldin Turkeš	27	10	8+13	7	3+3	3	0	0
11	FW	(Ghana) GHA	Francis Kyeremeh	41	6	21+9	4	6+1	1	4	1
17	FW	(Croatia) CRO	Karlo Butić	10	1	2+4	1	2+2	0	0	0
19	FW	(Serbia) SRB	Andreja Ristić	5	0	1+2	0	0+2	0	0	0
31	FW	(Bosnia and Herzegovina) BIH	Ahmed Tiro	3	0	1+2	0	0	0	0	0
46	FW	(Georgia (country)) GEO	Vasilios Gordeziani	13	2	6+5	2	0+2	0	0	0
Players transferred out during the season
3	DF	(Bosnia and Herzegovina) BIH	Elvir Duraković	10	0	1+5	0	0+1	0	2+1	0
5	MF	(Montenegro) MNE	Marko Matanović	2	0	0+2	0	0	0	0	0
7	FW	(Bosnia and Herzegovina) BIH	Hamza Čataković	7	2	2+1	2	0	0	3+1	0
9	FW	(Brazil) BRA	Renan Oliveira	19	4	6+10	3	0	0	1+2	1
18	MF	(Croatia) CRO	Edin Julardžija	7	0	0+3	0	0	0	0+4	0
26	DF	(Bosnia and Herzegovina) BIH	Elnes Alajmović	0	0	0	0	0	0	0	0
32	MF	(Bosnia and Herzegovina) BIH	Nemanja Anđušić	11	0	2+5	0	0	0	0+4	0
33	DF	(Bosnia and Herzegovina) BIH	Nidal Čelik	19	0	14+1	0	0	0	4	0
44	MF	(Montenegro) MNE	Miomir Đuričković	15	0	10+2	0	1	0	2	0

Number after the "+" sign represents the number of games player started the game on the bench and was substituted on.

=== Goalscorers ===
Rank	No.	Pos.	Nat.	Player	Bosnian Premier League	Bosnian Cup	Conference League	Total
1	7/17	FW	(Georgia (country))	Giorgi Guliashvili	16	4	1	21
2	9/99	FW	(Bosnia and Herzegovina)	Aldin Turkeš	7	3	0	10
3	11	FW	(Ghana)	Francis Kyeremeh	4	1	1	6
3	29	MF	(Montenegro)	Vladan Bubanja	4	2	0	6
5	5	MF	(Croatia)	Karlo Lulić	4	1	0	5
6	9	FW	(Brazil)	Renan Oliveira	3	0	1	4
7	14	MF	(Serbia)	Aleksandar Đorđević	3	0	0	3
7	18	MF	(Croatia)	Domagoj Pavičić	2	1	0	3
9	6/24	DF	(Croatia)	Vinko Soldo	2	0	0	2
9	7	FW	(Bosnia and Herzegovina)	Hamza Čataković	2	0	0	2
9	16	DF	(Serbia)	Filip Jović	2	0	0	2
9	46	FW	(Georgia (country))	Vasilios Gordeziani	2	0	0	2
13	10	MF	(Luxembourg)	Mirza Mustafić	1	0	0	1
13	17	FW	(Croatia)	Karlo Butić	1	0	0	1
13	23	MF	(Bosnia and Herzegovina)	Anes Krdžalić	1	0	0	1
13	44	DF	(Bulgaria)	Martin Paskalev	1	0	0	1
13	77	DF	(Croatia)	Mihael Kuprešak	1	0	0	1
Own goals					3	2	0	5
Total					59	14	3	76

=== Hat-tricks ===
Player	Against	Result	Date	Competition	Ref
(Bosnia and Herzegovina) Aldin Turkeš	(Bosnia and Herzegovina) Sloga Doboj	0–4 (A)	3 May 2025	Bosnian Premier League	

(H) – Home; (A) – Away

=== Assists ===
Rank	No.	Pos.	Nat.	Player	Bosnian Premier League	Bosnian Cup	Conference League	Total
1	2/28	DF	(Croatia)	Bruno Unušić	5	1	0	6
1	7/17	FW	(Georgia (country))	Giorgi Guliashvili	5	1	0	6
1	14	MF	(Serbia)	Aleksandar Đorđević	6	0	0	6
4	44	MF	(Montenegro)	Miomir Đuričković	4	0	1	5
4	77	DF	(Croatia)	Mihael Kuprešak	1	4	0	5
6	22	DF	(Bosnia and Herzegovina)	Amar Beganović	3	1	0	4
7	4	DF	(Bosnia and Herzegovina)	Nermin Mujkić	1	2	0	3
7	11	FW	(Ghana)	Francis Kyeremeh	2	1	0	3
7	29	MF	(Montenegro)	Vladan Bubanja	2	1	0	3
10	5	MF	(Croatia)	Karlo Lulić	2	0	0	2
10	6/24	DF	(Croatia)	Vinko Soldo	2	0	0	2
10	9/99	FW	(Bosnia and Herzegovina)	Aldin Turkeš	2	0	0	2
10	10	MF	(Luxembourg)	Mirza Mustafić	2	0	0	2
10	17	FW	(Croatia)	Karlo Butić	1	1	0	2
10	33	DF	(Bosnia and Herzegovina)	Nidal Čelik	2	0	0	2
16	7	FW	(Bosnia and Herzegovina)	Hamza Čataković	1	0	0	1
16	8	MF	(Bosnia and Herzegovina)	Eldar Mehmedović	0	0	1	1
16	9	FW	(Brazil)	Renan Oliveira	1	0	0	1
16	16	DF	(Serbia)	Filip Jović	1	0	0	1
16	18	MF	(Croatia)	Domagoj Pavičić	1	0	0	1
16	21	MF	(The Gambia)	Momodou Jatta	1	0	0	1
16	23	MF	(Bosnia and Herzegovina)	Anes Krdžalić	1	0	0	1
16	44	DF	(Bulgaria)	Martin Paskalev	1	0	0	1
16	46	FW	(Georgia (country))	Vasilios Gordeziani	1	0	0	1
Total					48	12	2	62

=== Clean sheets ===
Rank	No.	Nat.	Player	Premier League	Cup of BiH	Conference League	Total
1	39	(Croatia)	Lovre Rogić	13	4	0	17
2	42	(Serbia)	Emil Rockov	3	0	2	5
Total				16	4	2	22

=== Disciplinary record ===
N	P	Nat.	Name	Premier League			Cup of BiH			Conference League			Total			Notes
N	P	Nat.	Name	Yellow card	Second yellow card	Red card	Yellow card	Second yellow card	Red card	Yellow card	Second yellow card	Red card	Yellow card	Second yellow card	Red card	Notes
2/28	DF	(Croatia)	Bruno Unušić	1									1			
3	DF	(Bosnia and Herzegovina)	Elvir Duraković	3									3			
3	DF	(Bosnia and Herzegovina)	Renato Gojković	1									1			
4	DF	(Bosnia and Herzegovina)	Nermin Mujkić	3		1	1						4		1	
5	MF	(Croatia)	Karlo Lulić	3			2						5			
6/24	DF	(Croatia)	Vinko Soldo	7			3			3			13			
7/17	FW	(Georgia (country))	Giorgi Guliashvili	3									3			
8	MF	(Bosnia and Herzegovina)	Eldar Mehmedović	2			2			1			5			
9	FW	(Brazil)	Renan Oliveira	2									2			
9/99	FW	(Bosnia and Herzegovina)	Aldin Turkeš	2									2			
10	MF	(Luxembourg)	Mirza Mustafić	6						1			7			
11	FW	(Ghana)	Francis Kyeremeh	4		1	2			1			7		1	
14	MF	(Serbia)	Aleksandar Đorđević	4						1			5			
16	DF	(Serbia)	Filip Jović	9						1			10			
17	FW	(Croatia)	Karlo Butić				1						1			
18	MF	(Croatia)	Edin Julardžija							1			1			
18	MF	(Croatia)	Domagoj Pavičić	2	1		1						3	1		
21	MF	(The Gambia)	Momodou Jatta	2									2			
22	DF	(Bosnia and Herzegovina)	Amar Beganović	3	1		4			1			8	1		
23	MF	(Bosnia and Herzegovina)	Anes Krdžalić				1						1			
29	MF	(Montenegro)	Vladan Bubanja	6			1			1			8			
32	MF	(Bosnia and Herzegovina)	Nemanja Anđušić							1			1			
33	DF	(Bosnia and Herzegovina)	Nidal Čelik	2		1							2		1	
39	GK	(Croatia)	Lovre Rogić	1			1			1			3			
42	GK	(Serbia)	Emil Rockov							1			1			
44	MF	(Montenegro)	Miomir Đuričković	3							1		3	1		
44	DF	(Bulgaria)	Martin Paskalev	3			2						5			
77	DF	(Croatia)	Mihael Kuprešak	2	1			1					2	2		
		(Croatia)	Zoran Zekić	2						1			3			Manager
		(Croatia)	Mario Kuić	3		1	2						5		1	Assistant manager
		(Croatia)	Želimir Mešnjak	5			1		1				6		1	Assistant manager
		(Bosnia and Herzegovina)	Enes Beganović						1						1	Physiotherapist
		(Bosnia and Herzegovina)	Eldin Jarović			2			1						3	Physiotherapist
		(Bosnia and Herzegovina)	Mustafa Beridan	1		2							1		2	Technical staff manager
		(Bosnia and Herzegovina)	Nermin Šabanović				1						1			Club representative
		(Bosnia and Herzegovina)	Zlatan Čakal	2			1						3			Head of security

Source: Competitive matches
Only competitive matches
(yellow card) = Number of bookings; (second yellow card) = Number of sending offs after a second yellow card; (red card) = Number of sending offs by a direct red card.

=== Games as captain ===
Rank	No.	Pos.	Nat.	Player	Bosnian Premier League	Bosnian Cup	Conference League	Total
1	7/17	FW	(Georgia (country))	Giorgi Guliashvili	8	4	0	12
2	44	MF	(Montenegro)	Miomir Đuričković	5	1	2	8
3	22	DF	(Bosnia and Herzegovina)	Amar Beganović	5	2	0	7
3	33	DF	(Bosnia and Herzegovina)	Nidal Čelik	7	0	0	7
5	10	MF	(Luxembourg)	Mirza Mustafić	4	0	0	4
6	7	FW	(Bosnia and Herzegovina)	Hamza Čataković	2	0	1	3
7	29	MF	(Montenegro)	Vladan Bubanja	1	1	0	2
8	6/24	DF	(Croatia)	Vinko Soldo	1	0	0	1
8	9	FW	(Brazil)	Renan Oliveira	0	0	1	1
Total					33	8	4	45
