= Elvir Duraković =

Bosnian footballer

Personal information
- Date of birth: 7 February 2000 (age 26)
- Place of birth: Bugojno, Bosnia and Herzegovina
- Height: 1.86 m (6 ft 1 in)
- Position: Left-back

Team information
- Current team: Gorica
- Number: 32

Youth career
- 2008–2016: Iskra
- 2016–2017: Željezničar
- 2017–2018: Zrinjski
- 2018–2019: Željezničar

Senior career*
Years	Team	Apps	(Gls)
2019–2020	Bratstvo Gračanica	13	(1)
2020–2021	Tuzla City	9	(0)
2021–2022	Mladost Doboj Kakanj	8	(1)
2022–2023	Igman Konjic	45	(2)
2023–2025	Sarajevo	23	(0)
2025	→ Šibenik (loan)	17	(0)
2025–	Gorica	16	(0)

International career
2016	Bosnia and Herzegovina U16	2	(0)
- * Club domestic league appearances and goals as of 15 June 2026

Elvir Duraković (born 7 February 2000) is a Bosnian professional footballer who plays as a left-back for Croatian Football League club Gorica.

== Club career ==
=== Tuzla City ===
After starting his senior career with NK Bratstvo Gračanica, Duraković signed with Bosnian Premier League side FK Tuzla City in July 2020. He made his debut in a league match against Široki Brijeg.

=== Mladost Doboj Kakanj ===
In June 2021 Duraković signed with Mladost Doboj Kakanj of the First League of the Federation of Bosnia and Herzegovina.

=== Igman ===
In June 2022 he signed with Bosnian Premier League side Igman Konjic on a two-year deal, quickly establishing himself as a first team regular and being named best left-back of the 2022-23 season in Bosnia and Herzegovina.

=== Sarajevo ===
On 3 June 2023 Duraković signed a three-year deal with FK Sarajevo which will keep him at the Koševo City Stadium until the summer of 2026.

== International career ==
On 31 May 2023, Duraković was called up to the Bosnia and Herzegovina preliminary squad for the UEFA Euro 2024 qualifying ties against Luxembourg and Portugal.

== Career statistics ==
=== Club ===
As of match played 13 December 2025

Appearances and goals by club, season and competition
Club	Season	League			National cup (Note: Includes Bosnia and Herzegovina Cup, Croatian Cup)		Continental		Total	
Club	Season	Division	Apps	Goals	Apps	Goals	Apps	Goals	Apps	Goals
Bratstvo Gračanica	2019–20	First League of FBiH	13	1	1	0	—		14	1
Tuzla City	2020–21	Bosnian Premier League	9	0	2	0	—		11	0
Mladost Doboj Kakanj	2021–22	First League of FBiH	8	1	—		—		8	1
Igman Konjic	2021–22	First League of FBiH	14	0	3	0	—		17	0
Igman Konjic	2022–23	Bosnian Premier League	31	2	0	0	—		31	2
Igman Konjic	Total		45	2	3	0	—		48	2
Sarajevo	2023–24	Bosnian Premier League	17	0	2	0	2 (Note: Appearance(s) in UEFA Europa Conference League)	0	21	0
Sarajevo	2024–25	Bosnian Premier League	6	0	1	0	3	0	10	0
Sarajevo	Total		23	0	3	0	5	0	31	0
Šibenik (loan)	2024–25	Croatian Football League	17	0	—		—		17	0
Gorica	2025–26	Croatian Football League	12	0	2	0	—		14	0
Career total			127	4	11	0	5	0	143	4

== Honours ==
Igman Konjic

- First League of the FBiH: 2021–22

Sarajevo

- Bosnian Cup: 2024–25
