= Vinko Soldo =

Croatian footballer

Personal information
- Date of birth: 15 February 1998 (age 28)
- Place of birth: Zagreb, Croatia
- Height: 1.85 m (6 ft 1 in)
- Position: Centre-back

Team information
- Current team: Pendikspor
- Number: 6

Youth career
- 2007–2009: Dubrava
- 2009–2015: Dinamo Zagreb

Senior career*
Years	Team	Apps	(Gls)
2015–2017	Dinamo Zagreb II	31	(2)
2016–2021	Dinamo Zagreb	5	(0)
2017	→ Lokomotiva (loan)	5	(0)
2018	→ Cibalia (loan)	15	(0)
2018	→ Rudeš (loan)	5	(0)
2019	→ KuPS (loan)	21	(0)
2020–2021	→ Slaven Belupo (loan)	20	(1)
2021	→ Diósgyőr (loan)	15	(0)
2021–2023	Slaven Belupo	56	(0)
2023–2025	Sarajevo	50	(2)
2025–	Pendikspor	36	(2)

International career
2012	Croatia U14	2	(0)
2013	Croatia U15	7	(0)
2013–2014	Croatia U16	5	(0)
2014–2015	Croatia U17	19	(1)
2015	Croatia U18	6	(1)
2016–2018	Croatia U19	12	(2)
2018	Croatia U20	3	(0)
2019	Croatia U21	4	(2)
2023	Croatia U23	1	(0)
- * Club domestic league appearances and goals as of 5 May 2026

Vinko Soldo (born 15 February 1998) is a Croatian football player who plays as centre-back for TFF 1. Lig club Pendikspor.

== Club career ==
=== Early career ===
In 2009, Soldo joined GNK Dinamo Zagreb youth academy when he was a child from NK Dubrava. He was one of the Dinamo Zagreb players born in 1998, including Josip Brekalo, Nikola Moro, Borna Sosa, Branimir Kalaica and Adrian Šemper.

=== Dinamo Zagreb ===
On 12 January 2016, Soldo has signed his first professional contract with Dinamo Zagreb. He made his league debut on 6 May 2016 against NK Slaven Belupo at Gradski stadion which Dinamo Zagreb won 3–0. In this match, he played 33 minutes, after he was substituted for Alexandru Mățel. In 2015/16 Season that Soldo made professional debut, Dinamo Zagreb achieved double:league and cup.

In July 2018, he joined Rudeš on loan until December 2018.

=== Slaven Belupo ===
On 14 July 2021, Soldo returned to Slaven Belupo after playing there on loan previously and signed a two-year contract.

=== Sarajevo ===
On 16 June 2023, Soldo signed a 2–year contract with Sarajevo.

== International career ==
Soldo has represented his country at various age groups, most recently for the Croatia national under-19 football team. In 2015, he played 2015 UEFA European Under-17 Championship and 2015 FIFA U-17 World Cup as one of the key players. Since March 2016, he has been member of Croatia national under-19 football team.

== Career statistics ==
=== Club ===
As of match played 31 May 2025

Appearances and goals by club, season and competition
Club	Season	League			National cup (Note: Includes Croatian Cup, Finnish Cup, Magyar Kupa, Bosnia and Herzegovina Cup)		Continental		Total	
Club	Season	Division	Apps	Goals	Apps	Goals	Apps	Goals	Apps	Goals
Dinamo Zagreb	2015–16	Prva HNL	1	0	1	0	0	0	2	0
Dinamo Zagreb	2016–17	Prva HNL	4	0	3	0	0	0	7	0
Dinamo Zagreb	2017–18	Prva HNL	0	0	0	0	0	0	0	0
Dinamo Zagreb	2018–19	Prva HNL	0	0	0	0	0	0	0	0
Dinamo Zagreb	2019–20	Prva HNL	0	0	0	0	0	0	0	0
Dinamo Zagreb	2020–21	Prva HNL	0	0	0	0	0	0	0	0
Dinamo Zagreb	Total		5	0	4	0	0	0	9	0
Lokomotiva Zagreb (loan)	2017–18	Prva HNL	5	0	1	0	—		6	0
Cibalia (loan)	2017–18	Prva HNL	15	0	0	0	—		15	0
Rudeš (loan)	2018–19	Prva HNL	5	0	0	0	—		5	0
KuPS (loan)	2019	Veikkausliiga	21	0	0	0	4 (Note: Appearance(s) in UEFA Europa League)	0	25	0
Slaven Belupo (loan)	2019–20	Prva HNL	6	0	1	0	—		7	0
Slaven Belupo (loan)	2020–21	Prva HNL	14	1	0	0	—		14	1
Slaven Belupo (loan)	Total		20	1	1	0	—		21	1
Diósgyőri (loan)	2020–21	NB I	15	0	2	0	—		17	0
Slaven Belupo	2021–22	Prva HNL	26	0	0	0	—		26	0
Slaven Belupo	2022–23	Prva HNL	30	0	3	0	—		33	0
Slaven Belupo	Total		56	0	3	0	—		59	0
Sarajevo	2023–24	Bosnian Premier League	21	0	3	0	1 (Note: Appearance(s) in UEFA Europa Conference League)	0	25	0
Sarajevo	2024–25	Bosnian Premier League	29	2	6	0	3	0	38	2
Sarajevo	Total		50	2	9	0	4	0	63	2
Career total			192	3	20	0	8	0	220	3

== Honours ==
Dinamo Zagreb

- Croatian First Football League: 2015–16
- Croatian Football Cup: 2015–16

Kuopion Palloseura

- Veikkausliiga: 2019

Sarajevo

- Bosnian Cup: 2024–25
