= Filip Jović (footballer, born 2000) =

Serbian footballer (born 2000)

Personal information
- Date of birth: 27 February 2000 (age 26)
- Place of birth: Leskovac, FR Yugoslavia
- Height: 1.82 m (6 ft 0 in)
- Position: Left-back

Team information
- Current team: Đồng Nai City
- Number: 22

Youth career
- –2017: Vlasina
- 2017–2019: Spartak Subotica

Senior career*
Years	Team	Apps	(Gls)
2019–2022	Spartak Subotica	11	(0)
2020	→ Smederevo 1924 (loan)	5	(0)
2020	→ Železničar Pančevo (loan)	13	(1)
2022–2023	Novi Pazar	42	(0)
2023–2024	Radnik Surdulica	31	(0)
2024–2025	Sarajevo	33	(2)
2026	Slaven Belupo	5	(0)
2026–	Đồng Nai City	1	(0)

International career
2017	Serbia U18	2	(0)
- * Club domestic league appearances and goals as of 4 September 2026

Filip Jović (Serbian Cyrillic: Филип Јовић; born 27 February 2000) is a Serbian professional footballer who plays as a left-back for V.League 1 team Đồng Nai City.

== Career statistics ==
=== Club ===
As of match played 4 September 2026

Appearances and goals by club, season and competition
Club	Season	League			National cup (Note: Includes Serbian Cup, Bosnia and Herzegovina Cup, Croatian Cup, and Vietnamese Cup)		Continental		Other		Total	
Club	Season	Division	Apps	Goals	Apps	Goals	Apps	Goals	Apps	Goals	Apps	Goals
Spartak Subotica	2018–19	Serbian SuperLiga	1	0	0	0	—		—		1	0
Spartak Subotica	2019–20	Serbian SuperLiga	1	0	0	0	—		—		1	0
Spartak Subotica	2020–21	Serbian SuperLiga	7	0	1	0	—		—		8	0
Spartak Subotica	2021–22	Serbian SuperLiga	2	0	0	0	—		—		2	0
Spartak Subotica	Total		11	0	1	0	—		—		12	0
Smederevo 1924 (loan)	2019–20	Serbian First League	5	0	—		—		—		5	0
Železničar Pančevo (loan)	2020–21	Serbian First League	13	1	—		—		—		13	1
Novi Pazar	2021–22	Serbian SuperLiga	11	0	2	0	—		2 (Note: Appearance(s) in SuperLiga Relegations play-off)	0	15	0
Novi Pazar	2022–23	Serbian SuperLiga	31	0	2	0	—		—		33	0
Novi Pazar	Total		42	0	4	0	—		2	0	48	0
Radnik Surdulica	2023–24	Serbian SuperLiga	31	0	1	0	—		—		32	0
Sarajevo	2024–25	Bosnian Premier League	24	2	4	0	4 (Note: Appearances in UEFA Conference League)	0	—		32	2
Sarajevo	2025–26	Bosnian Premier League	9	0	1	0	2	0	—		12	0
Sarajevo	Total		33	2	5	0	6	0	—		44	2
Slaven Belupo	2025–26	Croatian Football League	5	0	2	0	—		—		7	0
Slaven Belupo	Total		5	0	2	0	—		—		7	0
Dong Nai City	2026–27	V.League 1	1	0	0	0	—		—		1	0
Career total			141	3	13	0	6	0	2	0	163	3

== Honours ==
Sarajevo

- Bosnian Cup: 2024–25
