= Karlo Lulić =

Croatian footballer

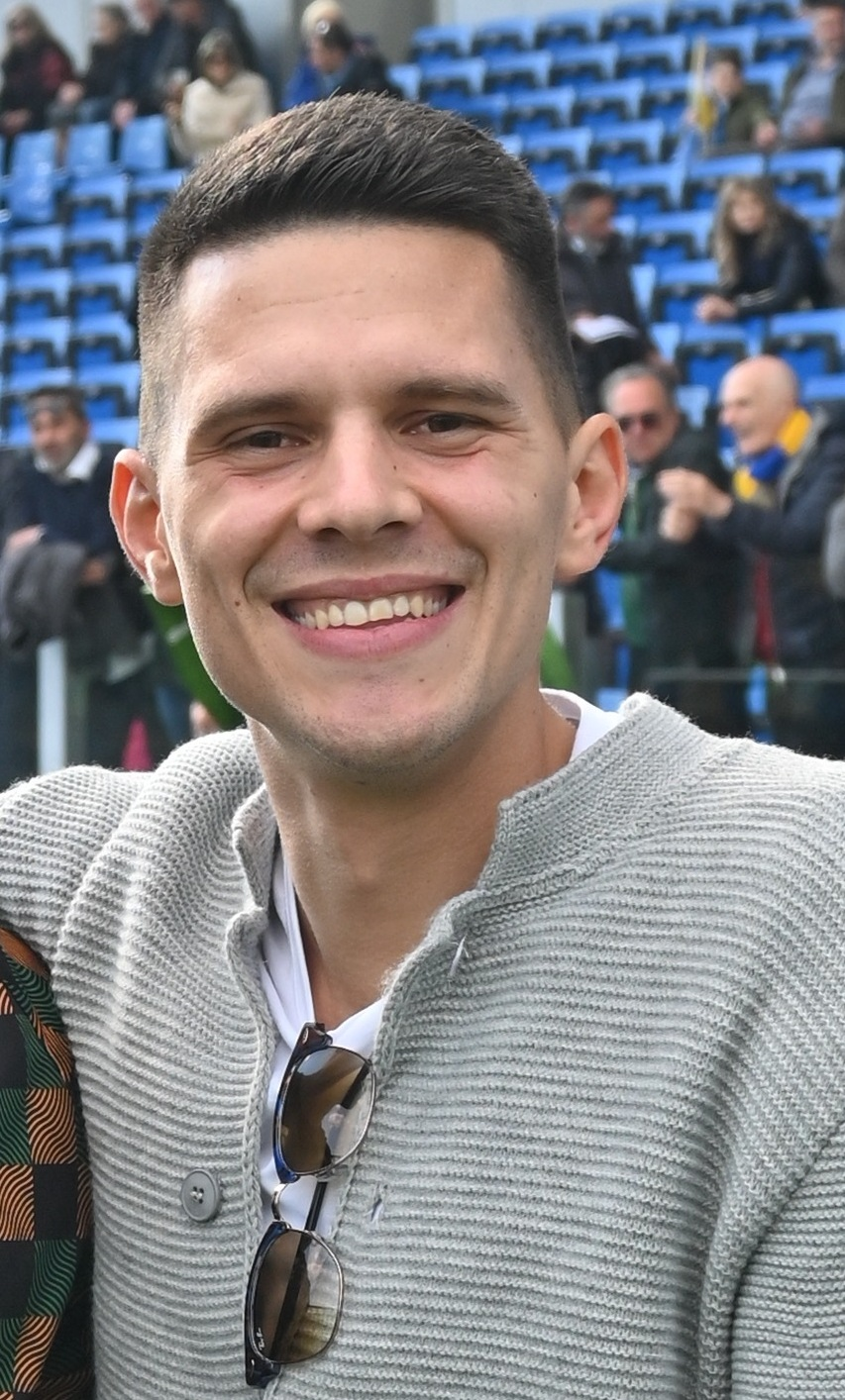
- Lulić with Frosinone Calcio in 2023

Personal information
- Date of birth: 10 May 1996 (age 30)
- Place of birth: Nova Gradiška, Croatia
- Height: 1.86 m (6 ft 1 in)
- Position: Midfielder

Team information
- Current team: Casarano
- Number: 4

Youth career
- Graničar Laze
- 2006–2010: Mladost Cernik
- 2010–2013: Osijek
- 2014–2015: Sampdoria

Senior career*
Years	Team	Apps	(Gls)
2013–2014	Osijek	19	(4)
2014–2017	Sampdoria	0	(0)
2015–2016	→ Bohemians Prague (loan)	8	(1)
2016–2017	→ Osijek (loan)	11	(1)
2017–2018	Rudeš	28	(4)
2018–2020	Waasland-Beveren	22	(0)
2019–2020	→ Slaven Belupo (loan)	24	(2)
2020–2021	Slaven Belupo	39	(1)
2021–2024	Frosinone	47	(2)
2024–2025	Bari	19	(0)
2024–2025	→ Sarajevo (loan)	26	(4)
2025–	Casarano	22	(2)

International career
2010–2011	Croatia U15	4	(0)
2012	Croatia U16	2	(0)
2012–2013	Croatia U17	10	(1)
2013–2014	Croatia U18	5	(1)
2015	Croatia U19	5	(1)
2015	Croatia U21	1	(0)
- * Club domestic league appearances and goals as of 1 May 2026

Karlo Lulić (born 10 May 1996) is a Croatian professional footballer who plays as a midfielder for Serie C Group C club Casarano.

== Club career ==
Born in Nova Gradiška, Lulić started playing football at his village's club NK Graničar Laze, before moving early to NK Mladost Cernik. In 2010, he moved to NK Osijek. He made his professional debut during the 2012/13 season. His first goal came during the 2013/14 Prva HNL season. On 23 September 2014 he moved to Sampdoria.

On 30 August 2021 he returned to Italy and signed with Frosinone in Serie B.

On 3 January 2024, Lulić signed a contract with Bari until 30 June 2026.

== Career statistics ==
As of match played 31 May 2025

Appearances and goals by club, season and competition
Club	Season	League			National cup (Note: Includes Croatian Cup, Coppa Italia, Belgian Cup, Bosnia and Herzegovina Cup)		Total	
Club	Season	Division	Apps	Goals	Apps	Goals	Apps	Goals
Osijek	2012–13	Prva HNL	1	0	—		1	0
Osijek	2013–14	Prva HNL	18	4	0	0	18	4
Osijek	Total		19	4	0	0	19	4
Sampdoria	2014–15	Serie A	0	0	1	0	1	0
Bohemians 1905 (loan)	2015–16	Czech First League	8	1	—		8	1
Osijek (loan)	2016–17	Prva HNL	11	1	2	0	13	1
Rudeš	2017–18	Prva HNL	28	4	3	1	31	5
Waasland-Beveren	2018–19	Belgian First Division A	22	0	1	0	23	0
Slaven Belupo (loan)	2019–20	Prva HNL	24	2	4	0	28	2
Slaven Belupo	2020–21	Prva HNL	34	1	2	0	36	1
Slaven Belupo	2021–22	Prva HNL	5	0	—		5	0
Slaven Belupo	Total		63	3	6	0	69	3
Frosinone	2021–22	Serie B	26	2	—		26	2
Frosinone	2022–23	Serie B	20	0	1	0	21	0
Frosinone	2023–24	Serie A	1	0	1	0	2	0
Frosinone	Total		47	2	2	0	49	2
Bari	2023–24	Serie B	17	0	—		17	0
Bari	2024–25	Serie B	2	0	0	0	2	0
Bari	Total		19	0	0	0	19	0
Sarajevo (loan)	2024–25	Bosnian Premier League	26	4	8	1	34	5
Career total			243	19	23	2	266	21

== Honours ==
Sarajevo

- Bosnian Cup: 2024–25
