= Bruno Unušić =

Croatian footballer (born 2002)

Personal information
- Date of birth: 9 February 2002 (age 24)
- Place of birth: Split, Croatia
- Height: 1.82 m (6 ft 0 in)
- Position: Right-back

Team information
- Current team: Dukla Prague

Youth career
- 2009–2010: Spinut Split
- 2010–2020: Hajduk Split

Senior career*
Years	Team	Apps	(Gls)
2020–2021	Hajduk Split II	25	(0)
2021	Hajduk Split	0	(0)
2021	→ Kustošija (loan)	11	(0)
2022–2023	Osijek II	13	(0)
2022–2023	→ Cibalia (loan)	30	(1)
2023–2024	Zrinski Osječko	32	(0)
2024–2025	Sarajevo	24	(0)
2026–	Dukla Prague	11	(0)

International career
2018	Croatia U16	2	(0)
2019	Croatia U17	2	(0)
- * Club domestic league appearances and goals as of 15 May 2026

Bruno Unušić (born 2 February 2002) is a Croatian professional footballer who plays as a right-back for Czech First League club Dukla Prague.

== Career statistics ==
=== Club ===
As of match played 31 May 2025

Appearances and goals by club, season and competition
Club	Season	League			National cup (Note: Includes Croatian Cup, Bosnia and Herzegovina Cup)		Continental		Total	
Club	Season	Division	Apps	Goals	Apps	Goals	Apps	Goals	Apps	Goals
Hajduk Split II	2019–20	Druga HNL	2	0	—		—		2	0
Hajduk Split II	2020–21	Druga HNL	23	0	—		—		23	0
Hajduk Split II	Total		25	0	—		—		25	0
Hajduk Split	2020–21	Prva HNL	0	0	0	0	—		0	0
Kustošija (loan)	2021–22	Druga HNL	11	0	—		—		11	0
Osijek II	2021–22	Druga HNL	13	0	—		—		13	0
Cibalia (loan)	2022–23	Druga HNL	30	1	1	0	—		31	1
Zrinski Osječko	2023–24	Druga HNL	32	0	—		—		32	0
Sarajevo	2024–25	Bosnian Premier League	24	0	6	0	1 (Note: Appearance(s) in UEFA Conference League)	0	31	0
Career total			135	1	7	0	1	0	143	1

== Honours ==
Sarajevo

- Bosnian Cup: 2024–25
