= Aleksandar Đorđević (footballer, born 1999) =

Serbian footballer

Personal information
- Date of birth: 20 December 1999 (age 26)
- Place of birth: Belgrade, FR Yugoslavia
- Height: 1.88 m (6 ft 2 in)
- Position: Defensive midfielder

Youth career
- –2018: Čukarički
- 2018: IMT (loan)

Senior career*
| Years | Team | Apps | (Gls) |
| 2018–2022 | Čukarički | 38 | (0) |
| 2020–2021 | → Inđija (loan) | 29 | (1) |
| 2021 | → Železničar Pančevo (loan) | 18 | (3) |
| 2022–2024 | Železničar Pančevo | 85 | (12) |
| 2024–2025 | Sarajevo | 24 | (3) |

International career
| 2018 | Serbia U19 | 2 | (0) |
| 2018 | Serbia U21 | 3 | (0) |
- * Club domestic league appearances and goals as of 20 January 2026

Aleksandar Đorđević (Serbian Cyrillic: Александар Ђорђевић; born 20 December 1999) is a Serbian professional footballer who plays as a defensive midfielder. He previously played for Čukarički and Železničar Pančevo in the Serbian SuperLiga, as well as being a Serbia youth international.

== Career statistics ==
=== Club ===
As of match played 2 November 2025

Appearances and goals by club, season and competition
| Club | Season | League | | | National cup (Note: Includes Serbian Cup, Bosnia and Herzegovina Cup) | | Continental | | Other | | Total | |
| Club | Season | Division | Apps | Goals | Apps | Goals | Apps | Goals | Apps | Goals | Apps | Goals |
|---|---|---|---|---|---|---|---|---|---|---|---|---|
| Čukarički | 2018–19 | Serbian SuperLiga | 23 | 0 | 1 | 0 | — | | — | | 24 | 0 |
| Čukarički | 2019–20 | Serbian SuperLiga | 12 | 0 | 2 | 0 | 4 (Note: Appearance(s) in UEFA Europa League) | 0 | — | | 18 | 0 |
| Čukarički | 2020–21 | Serbian SuperLiga | 3 | 0 | 0 | 0 | — | | — | | 3 | 0 |
| Čukarički | Total | | 38 | 0 | 3 | 0 | 4 | 0 | — | | 45 | 0 |
| Inđija (loan) | 2020–21 | Serbian SuperLiga | 29 | 1 | 1 | 0 | — | | — | | 30 | 1 |
| Železničar Pančevo | 2021–22 (Note: First half of the 2021–22 season, Đorđević played for Železničar Pančevo as a loaned player from Čukarički.) | Serbian First League | 34 | 4 | 2 | 0 | — | | 1 (Note: Appearance(s) in 2021–22 SuperLiga Relegations play-off) | 0 | 37 | 4 |
| Železničar Pančevo | 2022–23 | Serbian First League | 33 | 4 | 2 | 1 | — | | — | | 35 | 5 |
| Železničar Pančevo | 2023–24 | Serbian SuperLiga | 36 | 7 | 0 | 0 | — | | 2 (Note: Appearance(s) in 2023–24 SuperLiga Relegations play-off) | 1 | 38 | 8 |
| Železničar Pančevo | Total | | 103 | 15 | 4 | 1 | — | | 3 | 1 | 110 | 17 |
| Sarajevo | 2024–25 | Bosnian Premier League | 11 | 3 | 0 | 0 | 4 (Note: Appearance(s) in UEFA Conference League) | 0 | — | | 15 | 3 |
| Sarajevo | 2025–26 | Bosnian Premier League | 13 | 0 | 1 | 0 | 2 | 0 | — | | 16 | 0 |
| Sarajevo | Total | | 24 | 3 | 1 | 0 | 6 | 0 | — | | 31 | 3 |
| Career total | | | 194 | 19 | 9 | 1 | 10 | 0 | 3 | 1 | 216 | 21 |

== Honours ==
Sarajevo

- Bosnian Cup: 2024–25
