= Mirza Mustafić =

Luxembourgish footballer

Personal information
- Full name: Mirza Mustafić
- Date of birth: 20 June 1998 (age 28)
- Place of birth: Luxembourg City, Luxembourg
- Height: 1.75 m (5 ft 9 in)
- Position: Attacking midfielder

Youth career
- –2006: Racing FC
- 2006–2013: Metz
- 2013–2017: Borussia Mönchengladbach

Senior career*
Years	Team	Apps	(Gls)
2017–2019	Borussia Mönchengladbach II	50	(2)
2019–2021	Elversberg	20	(0)
2021–2022	Fola Esch	25	(10)
2022–2025	Sarajevo	72	(6)
2025–2026	Bali United	18	(5)

International career^{‡}
2014	Luxembourg U17	1	(0)
2014–2015	Bosnia and Herzegovina U17	8	(1)
2016–2017	Bosnia and Herzegovina U19	6	(1)
2024–	Luxembourg	1	(0)
- * Club domestic league appearances and goals as of 17 May 2026 ‡ National team caps and goals as of 5 June 2024

Mirza Mustafić (born 20 June 1998) is a Luxembourgish professional footballer who last played as an attacking midfielder for Super League club Bali United and the Luxembourg national team.

== Early life ==
Mustafić was born on 20 June 1998 in Luxembourg City to Bosnian parents who came to Luxembourg as immigrants due to the Bosnian War.

== Club career ==
=== Borussia Monchengladbach II ===
Mustafić started his professional career at Borussia Mönchengladbach II.

After he passed all categories in Borussia Mönchengladbach, he signs a contract for the reserve team of that club, which at that moment competes in Regionalliga West. He stayed in the reserve team for two years in the hope of getting a call-up from the first team, but he never got it. He left the club after two years.

=== Elversberg ===
In July 2019, Mustafić signed for Elversberg who at the time was competing in the Regionalliga Südwest. In the two seasons he spent at the club, he made twenty-four appearances in league, one in the cup and three and the regional cup who won it twice. He left the club after two years.

=== Fola Esch ===
In June 2021, Mustafić joined defending champion of Luxembourg Fola Esch. In thirty-seven appearances, he scored fifteen goals. After his contract expired, he did not find an agreement for a new one and left the club as a free agent.

=== Sarajevo ===
In August 2022, Mustafić signed for Sarajevo on a free transfer. In the first round of the Cup against Čelik Zenica, he missed a penalty, eliminating Sarajevo from the cup.

=== Bali United ===
On 15 July 2025, Mustafić signed a season long contract with Indonesian Super League club Bali United.

== International career ==
Mustafić made his debut for the Luxembourg national team on 5 June 2024 in a friendly against France. He substituted Sébastien Thill in the 44th minute due to Thill's injury and then had to be substituted due to injury himself in the 55th minute, as Luxembourg lost 0–3 in Metz.

== Career statistics ==
=== Club ===
As of match played 17 May 2026

Appearances and goals by club, season and competition
Club	Season	League			National cup (Note: Includes DFB-Pokal, Luxembourg Cup, Bosnia and Herzegovina Cup)		Continental		Other		Total	
Club	Season	Division	Apps	Goals	Apps	Goals	Apps	Goals	Apps	Goals	Apps	Goals
Borussia Mönchengladbach II	2017–18	Regionalliga West	25	2	0	0	—		—		25	2
Borussia Mönchengladbach II	2018–19	Regionalliga West	25	0	—		—		—		25	0
Borussia Mönchengladbach II	Total		50	2	0	0	—		—		50	2
Elversberg	2019–20	Regionalliga Südwest	12	0	0	0	—		3 (Note: Appearance(s) in Saarlandpokal)	2	15	2
Elversberg	2020–21	Regionalliga Südwest	8	0	1	0	—		—		9	0
Elversberg	Total		20	0	1	0	—		3	2	24	2
Fola Esch	2021–22	BGL Ligue	25	10	4	3	8 (Note: Two appearances in UEFA Champions League; six appearances, three goals in UEFA Europa League)	3	—		37	16
Sarajevo	2022–23	Bosnian Premier League	20	1	1	0	—		—		21	1
Sarajevo	2023–24	Bosnian Premier League	28	4	2	0	2 (Note: Appearance(s) in UEFA Europa Conference League)	0	—		32	4
Sarajevo	2024–25	Bosnian Premier League	24	1	6	0	1	0	—		31	1
Sarajevo	Total		72	6	9	0	3	0	—		84	6
Bali United	2025–26	Super League	18	5	0	0	—		—		18	5
Career total			185	23	14	3	11	3	3	2	213	31

=== International ===
As of match played 8 June 2024

Appearances and goals by national team and year
National team	Year	Apps	Goals
Luxembourg
Luxembourg	2024	1	0
Total		1	0

== Honours ==
Elversberg

- Saarland Cup: 2019–20, 2020–21

Sarajevo

- Bosnian Cup: 2024–25
