= Giorgi Guliashvili =

Georgian footballer (born 2001)

Personal information
- Date of birth: 5 September 2001 (age 25)
- Place of birth: Tbilisi, Georgia
- Height: 1.79 m (5 ft 10 in)
- Position: Forward

Team information
- Current team: Racing de Santander
- Number: 7

Youth career
- –2019: Sabutarlo

Senior career*
Years	Team	Apps	(Gls)
2019–2023	Saburtalo	79	(11)
2023–2026	Sarajevo	55	(17)
2023–2024	→ Velež Mostar (loan)	22	(8)
2026–	Racing de Santander	21	(6)

International career^{‡}
2018–2020	Georgia U19	18	(11)
2020–2023	Georgia U21	20	(8)
2025–	Georgia	8	(0)
- * Club domestic league appearances and goals as of 19 September 2026 ‡ National team caps and goals as of 14 November 2026

Giorgi Guliashvili (Georgian: გიორგი გულიაშვილი, romanized: giorgi guliashvili; born 5 September 2001) is a Georgian professional footballer who plays as a forward for La Liga club Racing de Santander and the Georgia national team.

== Club career ==
Guliashvili started playing for Saburtalo after having advanced into the first team through the academy ranks. He made a debut in Erovnuli Liga on 28 May 2019 when at the age of 17 he came on the pitch as a substitute in a 3–0 win against WIT Georgia. At the end of this season Guliashvili won two nominations at the annual awards ceremony organized by the Football Federation - Goal of the Season for the goal scored in a 2–0 win over Croatia U19s and the Alexander Chivadze Golden award for under-19 players.

He gradually secured a place in the team, playing for Saburtalo as a regular squad member during the next three seasons. Guliashvili netted his first top-league goal on 24 July 2020 against Torpedo Kutaisi.

He left the club in January 2023 and moved to Bosnian side Sarajevo for an undisclosed fee. In August 2023, he was loaned to Velež for one season. While the latter finished third in the league, Guliashvili was selected among the best eleven players of the season.

In 2025, Guliashvili contributed to his team with four goals as Sarajevo won the Bosnian Cup. He was named Player of the Season by the Union of Bosnian Football Players.

On 9 January 2026, Guliashvili joined Segunda División club Racing de Santander, signing a three-year contract.

== International career ==
Guliashvili has represented Georgia at all youth levels. He was first called up to the national U17 team. In the autumn of 2016, he played all three matches of the 2017 UEFA European Championship 1st qualifying round. After taking part in another season of the U17 campaign in 2017–18, Guliashvili joined the U19s, scoring a hat-trick in the debut game against Liechtenstein.

Guliashvili was a member of the Georgia national under-21 team. He shone with a brace in a friendly 3–2 win against England on 16 November 2021. Later Guliashvili featured in each of the four matches Georgia held in 2023 UEFA European championship, scoring a leveller against Belgium.

Although on the team sheet for the UEFA Nations League ties against Ukraine and Albania in October 2024, Guliashvili made his debut appearance for the national team in a 6–1 playoff win over Armenia on 23 March 2025.

== Career statistics ==
=== Club ===
As of match played 19 September 2026

Appearances and goals by club, season and competition
Club	Season	League			National cup (Note: Includes Georgian Cup, Bosnia and Herzegovina Cup, Copa del Rey)		Continental		Other		Total	
Club	Season	Division	Apps	Goals	Apps	Goals	Apps	Goals	Apps	Goals	Apps	Goals
Saburtalo Tbilisi	2018	Erovnuli Liga	0	0	1	0	0	0	—		1	0
Saburtalo Tbilisi	2019	Erovnuli Liga	4	0	0	0	0	0	—		4	0
Saburtalo Tbilisi	2020	Erovnuli Liga	14	4	3	0	1 (Note: Appearance(s) in UEFA Europa League)	1	—		18	5
Saburtalo Tbilisi	2021	Erovnuli Liga	26	3	3	0	—		1 (Note: Appearance(s) in Georgian Super Cup)	0	30	3
Saburtalo Tbilisi	2022	Erovnuli Liga	35	4	3	0	4 (Note: Appearance(s) in UEFA Europa Conference League)	0	—		42	4
Saburtalo Tbilisi	Total		79	11	10	0	5	1	1	0	95	12
Sarajevo	2022–23	Bosnian Premier League	10	0	0	0	—		—		10	0
Sarajevo	2023–24	Bosnian Premier League	1	0	0	0	1	0	—		2	0
Sarajevo	2024–25	Bosnian Premier League	26	16	7	4	4	1	—		37	21
Sarajevo	2025–26	Bosnian Premier League	18	1	0	0	2	1	—		20	2
Sarajevo	Total		55	17	7	4	7	2	—		69	23
Velež Mostar (loan)	2023–24	Bosnian Premier League	22	8	2	2	—		—		24	10
Racing de Santander	2025–26	Segunda División	17	6	1	0	—		—		18	6
Racing de Santander	2026–27	La Liga	4	0	0	0	—		—		4	0
Racing de Santander	Total		21	6	1	0	—		—		22	6
Career total			177	42	20	6	12	3	1	0	210	51

=== International ===
As of match played 14 November 2026

Appearances and goals by national team and year
National team	Year	Apps	Goals
Georgia
Georgia	2025	6	0
Georgia	2026	2	0
Total		8	0

== Honours ==
Saburtalo Tbilisi

- Erovnuli Liga: 2018
- Georgian Cup: 2019, 2021
- Georgian Super Cup: 2020

Sarajevo

- Bosnian Cup: 2024–25

Racing Santander

- Segunda División: 2025–26

Individual

- Erovnuli Liga Goal of the Season: 2019
- Erovnuli Liga Best under-19 player: 2019
- Bosnian Premier League Player of the Season: 2024–25
