= Zekić =

Zekić (pronounced [zěːkitɕ]) is a family name found in Croatia, Bosnia and Serbia.

In Croatia, the name is predominantly found among the Croats from the vicinity of Trogir. Most people with the surname Zekić in the past one hundred years have been born in the Dračevac Ninski region, where one in six individuals with that surname is found. Today, there are about 1,000 people with the surname Zekić in Croatia, up from around 300 in the 1950s.

== Individuals ==
- Zoran Zekić (b. 1974), Croatian football player and manager
- Miljan Zekić (b. 1988), Serbian tennis player
