= Martin Paskalev =

Bulgarian footballer

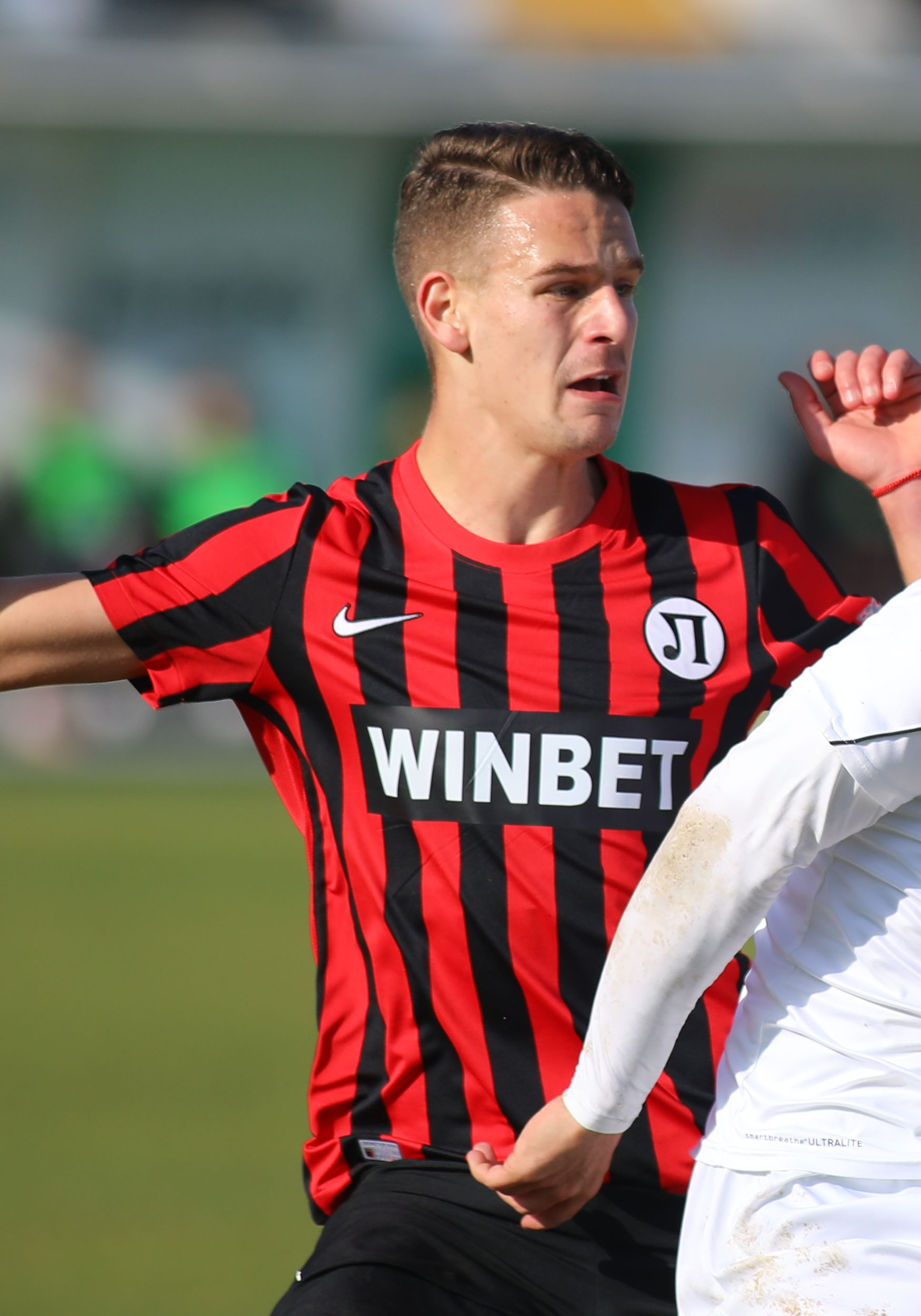
- Paskalev in 2021 with Lokomotiv Plovdiv

Personal information
- Full name: Martin Krasimirov Paskalev
- Date of birth: 25 December 2001 (age 24)
- Place of birth: Svilengrad, Bulgaria
- Height: 1.86 m (6 ft 1 in)
- Position: Centre-back

Team information
- Current team: Arda Kardzhali
- Number: 24

Youth career
- CSKA Sofia
- Lokomotiv Plovdiv

Senior career*
Years	Team	Apps	(Gls)
2018–2025	Lokomotiv Plovdiv	93	(4)
2020–2021	→ Spartak Varna (loan)	23	(7)
2025	Sarajevo	17	(1)
2026–	Arda Kardzhali	12	(0)
- * Club domestic league appearances and goals as of 11 June 2026

Martin Krasimirov Paskalev (Bulgarian: Мартин Красимиров Паскалев; born 25 December 2001) is a Bulgarian professional footballer who plays as a centre-back for First League club Arda Kardzhali.

== Career ==
Born in Svilengrad, Paskalev played as a youth for local club FC Svilengrad, CSKA Sofia and Lokomotiv Plovdiv.

He made his debut for the first team of Lokomotiv Plovdiv on 19 April 2019 in a 0:2 loss to Dunav Ruse. He scored his first goal for Lokomotiv on 12 September 2022 for the 1:0 win against Septemvri Sofia, becoming a man of the match. In 2020 he was sent on loan to Spartak Varna until end of the season. In January 2026, following a stint abroad with Bosnian club Sarajevo, Paskalev signed a two-and-a-half-year contract with Arda Kardzhali.

== Career statistics ==
=== Club ===
As of match played 28 October 2025

Appearances and goals by club, season and competition
Club	Season	League			National cup (Note: Includes Bulgarian Cup, Bosnia and Herzegovina Cup)		Continental		Total	
Club	Season	Division	Apps	Goals	Apps	Goals	Apps	Goals	Apps	Goals
Lokomotiv Plovdiv	2018–19	Bulgarian First League	1	0	—		—		1	0
Lokomotiv Plovdiv	2019–20	Bulgarian First League	0	0	—		—		0	0
Lokomotiv Plovdiv	2020–21	Bulgarian First League	0	0	—		—		0	0
Lokomotiv Plovdiv	2021–22	Bulgarian First League	16	0	3	0	0	0	19	0
Lokomotiv Plovdiv	2022–23	Bulgarian First League	33	3	2	0	—		35	3
Lokomotiv Plovdiv	2023–24	Bulgarian First League	27	0	2	0	—		29	0
Lokomotiv Plovdiv	2024–25	Bulgarian First League	16	1	1	0	—		17	1
Lokomotiv Plovdiv	Total		93	4	8	0	0	0	101	4
Spartak Varna (loan)	2020–21	Bulgarian Third League	23	7	1	0	—		24	7
Sarajevo	2024–25	Bosnian Premier League	13	1	5	0	—		18	1
Sarajevo	2025–26	Bosnian Premier League	4	0	1	0	1 (Note: Appearance in UEFA Conference League)	0	6	0
Sarajevo	Total		17	1	6	0	1	0	24	1
Career total			133	12	15	0	1	0	149	12

== Honours ==
Lokomotiv Plovdiv

- Bulgarian Cup: 2018–19

Sarajevo

- Bosnian Cup: 2024–25
