= Lovre Rogić =

Croatian footballer (born 1995)

Personal information
- Date of birth: 27 August 1995 (age 31)
- Place of birth: Zadar, Croatia
- Height: 1.90 m (6 ft 3 in)
- Position: Goalkeeper

Team information
- Current team: Rudeš
- Number: 95

Youth career
- –2011: Primorac Biograd
- 2011–2014: Šibenik

Senior career*
Years	Team	Apps	(Gls)
2014	Primorac Biograd	13	(0)
2015	SG Kelkheim	11	(0)
2015–2016	FC Kalbach	6	(0)
2016–2018	Primorac Biograd	61	(0)
2018–2023	Šibenik	81	(0)
2023–2025	Sarajevo	30	(0)
2025–2026	Anorthosis Famagusta	1	(0)
2026–	Rudeš	16	(0)
- * Club domestic league appearances and goals as of 11 November 2026

Lovre Rogić (born 27 August 1995) is a Croatian professional footballer who plays as a goalkeeper for Croatian Football League club Rudeš. Rogić has previously played for Šibenik and Sarajevo.

== Club career ==
=== Early career ===
Rogić started his football career at his hometown club HNK Primorac Biograd na Moru before moving to HNK Šibenik's youth team for three seasons.

== Career statistics ==
=== Club ===
As of match played 16 June 2026

Appearances and goals by club, season and competition
Club	Season	League			National cup (Note: Includes Croatian Cup, Bosnia and Herzegovina Cup)		Continental		Total	
Club	Season	Division	Apps	Goals	Apps	Goals	Apps	Goals	Apps	Goals
Šibenik	2018–19	Druga HNL	3	0	0	0	—		3	0
Šibenik	2019–20	Druga HNL	0	0	3	0	—		3	0
Šibenik	2020–21	Prva HNL	10	0	0	0	—		10	0
Šibenik	2021–22	Prva HNL	34	0	0	0	—		34	0
Šibenik	2022–23	Prva HNL	34	0	0	0	—		34	0
Šibenik	Total		81	0	3	0	—		84	0
Sarajevo	2023–24	Bosnian Premier League	7	0	2	0	1 (Note: Appearance(s) in UEFA Europa Conference League)	0	10	0
Sarajevo	2024–25	Bosnian Premier League	23	0	8	0	0	0	31	0
Sarajevo	Total		30	0	10	0	1	0	41	0
Anorthosis Famagusta	2025–26	Cypriot First Division	1	0	0	0	0	0	1	0
NK Rudeš	2025–26	First Football League (Croatia)	3	0	0	0	0	0	3	0
Career total			115	0	13	0	1	0	129	0

== Honours ==
Sarajevo

- Bosnian Cup: 2024–25
