= Eldar Mehmedović =

Bosnian footballer

Personal information
- Date of birth: 10 April 2003 (age 23)
- Place of birth: Tuzla, Bosnia and Herzegovina
- Height: 1.90 m (6 ft 3 in)
- Position: Midfielder

Team information
- Current team: Velež Mostar
- Number: 44

Youth career
- –2021: Sloboda Tuzla

Senior career*
Years	Team	Apps	(Gls)
2021–2023	Sloboda Tuzla	50	(5)
2023	Lokomotiva Zagreb	0	(0)
2023–2025	Sarajevo	30	(1)
2025	Spartak Subotica	10	(0)
2026	Sloga Doboj	12	(0)
2026–	Velež Mostar	1	(0)

International career
2017	Bosnia and Herzegovina U15	4	(1)
2019	Bosnia and Herzegovina U17	2	(0)
2021	Bosnia and Herzegovina U19	10	(1)
2022–2024	Bosnia and Herzegovina U21	10	(0)
- * Club domestic league appearances and goals as of 9 October 2026

Eldar Mehmedović (born 10 April 2003) is a Bosnian professional footballer who plays as a midfielder for Bosnian Premier League club Velež Mostar.

== Career statistics ==
=== Club ===
As of match played 9 October 2026

Appearances and goals by club, season and competition
Club	Season	League			National cup (Note: Includes Bosnian Cup, Croatian Cup, Serbian Cup)		Continental		Total	
Club	Season	Division	Apps	Goals	Apps	Goals	Apps	Goals	Apps	Goals
Sloboda Tuzla	2020–21	Bosnian Premier League	3	0	0	0	—		3	0
Sloboda Tuzla	2021–22	Bosnian Premier League	19	0	2	0	—		21	0
Sloboda Tuzla	2022–23	Bosnian Premier League	28	5	2	1	—		30	6
Sloboda Tuzla	Total		50	5	4	1	—		54	6
Lokomotiva Zagreb	2023–24	Croatian Football League	0	0	0	0	—		0	0
Sarajevo	2023–24	Bosnian Premier League	13	1	1	0	—		14	1
Sarajevo	2024–25	Bosnian Premier League	17	0	6	0	4 (Note: Appearance(s) in UEFA Conference League)	0	27	0
Sarajevo	Total		30	1	7	0	4	0	41	1
Spartak Subotica	2025–26	Serbian SuperLiga	10	0	2	1	—		12	1
Sloga Doboj	2025–26	Bosnian Premier League	12	0	2	0	—		14	0
Velež Mostar	2026–27	Bosnian Premier League	1	0	0	0	—		1	0
Career total			103	6	15	2	4	0	122	8

== Honours ==
Sarajevo

- Bosnian Cup: 2024–25
