= Aldin Turkeš =

Bosnian footballer (born 1996)

Personal information
- Date of birth: 22 April 1996 (age 30)
- Place of birth: Zug, Switzerland
- Height: 1.93 m (6 ft 4 in)
- Position: Forward

Team information
- Current team: Winterthur
- Number: 22

Youth career
- Luzern
- 2013–2015: Grasshopper
- 2015–2016: Zürich

Senior career*
Years	Team	Apps	(Gls)
2016	Zürich	7	(0)
2016–2018	Vaduz	40	(2)
2018	→ Rapperswil-Jona (loan)	15	(8)
2018–2019	Rapperswil-Jona	34	(16)
2019–2023	Lausanne-Sport	61	(28)
2023–2024	Winterthur	33	(9)
2024–2026	Sarajevo	29	(7)
2025	→ Al-Ittifaq (loan)	9	(2)
2026–	Winterthur	5	(0)

International career
2014	Switzerland U18	3	(0)
2014–2015	Switzerland U19	9	(7)
2016	Switzerland U20	2	(0)
2018	Bosnia and Herzegovina U21	1	(1)
- * Club domestic league appearances and goals as of 28 September 2026

Aldin Turkeš (Bosnian pronunciation: [âldiːn tǔrkeʃ]; born 22 April 1996) is a Swiss-Bosnian professional footballer who plays as a forward for Swiss Super League club Winterthur. Born in Switzerland, and a former Swiss youth international, he most recently represented Bosnia and Herzegovina at youth level.

Turkeš started his professional career at Zürich, before joining Vaduz in 2016. Two years later, he was loaned to Rapperswil-Jona, with whom he signed permanently later that year. The following year, he moved to Lausanne-Sport.

== Club career ==
=== Early career ===
Turkeš started playing football at Luzern, before joining Grasshopper's youth academy in 2013. Two years later, he moved to Zürich's youth setup. He made his professional debut against Young Boys on 27 February 2016 at the age of 19.

In August 2016, he switched to Vaduz. He scored his first professional goal on 28 May 2017.

In January 2018, Turkeš was sent on a six-month loan to Rapperswil-Jona. In July, he joined the team permanently. Turkeš scored his first career hat-trick against Kriens on 28 July.

On 26 June 2019, he signed with Lausanne-Sport. In December 2020, he suffered a severe knee injury, which was diagnosed as anterior cruciate ligament tear and was ruled out for at least six months.

On 9 August 2024, Turkeš signed three-year contract with Sarajevo.

== International career ==
Despite representing Switzerland at various youth levels, Turkeš decided to play for Bosnia and Herzegovina at senior level. In September 2018, his request to switch international allegiance to Bosnia and Herzegovina was approved by FIFA, and a month later he became part of the Bosnia and Herzegovina under-21 team, making his debut in a UEFA Euro 2019 qualification match against Portugal after coming on as a substitute in the 89th minute for Amer Gojak and scoring his side's second goal in a 2–4 away defeat.

After his debut for Bosnia and Herzegovina U21, there were reports that he might switch his allegiance to Kosovo. In October 2020, he received his first senior call-up for a friendly against Iran and 2020–21 UEFA Nations League matches against Netherlands and Italy.

== Career statistics ==
=== Club ===
As of match played 11 March 2026

Appearances and goals by club, season and competition
Club	Season	League			National cup (Note: Includes Swiss Cup, Liechtenstein Cup, Bosnian Cup)		Continental		Total	
Club	Season	Division	Apps	Goals	Apps	Goals	Apps	Goals	Apps	Goals
Zürich	2015–16	Swiss Super League	7	0	0	0	—		7	0
Vaduz	2016–17	Swiss Super League	24	1	3	10	—		27	11
Vaduz	2017–18	Swiss Challenge League	16	1	1	5	4 (Note: Appearance(s) in UEFA Europa League)	2	21	8
Vaduz	Total		40	2	4	15	4	2	48	19
Rapperswil-Jona (loan)	2017–18	Swiss Challenge League	15	8	—		—		15	8
Rapperswil-Jona	2018–19	Swiss Challenge League	34	16	3	3	—		37	19
Rapperswil-Jona	Total		49	24	3	3	—		52	27
Lausanne-Sport	2019–20	Swiss Challenge League	34	22	4	3	—		38	25
Lausanne-Sport	2020–21	Swiss Super League	13	6	1	1	—		14	7
Lausanne-Sport	2021–22	Swiss Super League	0	0	0	0	—		0	0
Lausanne-Sport	2022–23	Swiss Super League	14	0	2	2	—		16	2
Lausanne-Sport	Total		61	28	7	6	—		68	34
Winterthur	2023–24	Swiss Super League	31	9	4	1	—		35	10
Winterthur	2024–25	Swiss Super League	2	0	0	0	—		2	0
Winterthur	Total		33	9	4	1	—		37	10
Sarajevo	2024–25	Bosnian Premier League	21	7	6	3	—		27	10
Sarajevo	2025–26	Bosnian Premier League	8	0	3	0	1 (Note: Appearance in UEFA Conference League)	0	12	0
Sarajevo	Total		29	7	9	3	1	0	39	10
Al-Ittifaq (loan)	2025–26	UAE First Division	9	2	—		—		9	2
Career total			228	72	27	28	5	2	259	102

== Honours ==
Zürich

- Swiss Cup: 2015–16

Vaduz

- Liechtenstein Cup: 2016–17

Lausanne-Sport

- Swiss Challenge League: 2019–20

Sarajevo

- Bosnian Cup: 2024–25

Individual

Performances

- Swiss Challenge League Top Goalscorer: 2019–20
