= Vladan Bubanja =

Montenegrin footballer

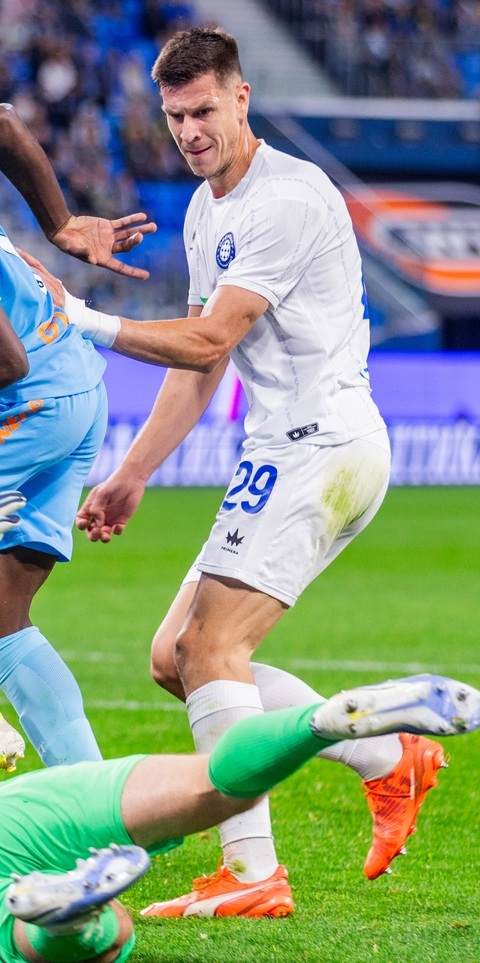
- Bubanja with Orenburg in 2025

Personal information
- Date of birth: 21 February 1999 (age 27)
- Place of birth: Nikšić, FR Yugoslavia
- Height: 1.94 m (6 ft 4 in)
- Position: Defensive midfielder

Team information
- Current team: Rapid București (on loan from Orenburg)
- Number: 22

Youth career
- 2009–2017: Sutjeska Nikšić

Senior career*
Years	Team	Apps	(Gls)
2017–2022	Sutjeska Nikšić	105	(11)
2022–2024	Lokomotiva	55	(6)
2024–2025	Sarajevo	28	(4)
2025–	Orenburg	8	(0)
2026	→ Osijek (loan)	17	(2)
2026–	→ Rapid București (loan)	15	(1)

International career^{‡}
2017–2018	Montenegro U19	5	(0)
2018–2019	Montenegro U21	4	(0)
2023–	Montenegro	1	(0)
- * Club domestic league appearances and goals as of 7 November 2026 ‡ National team caps and goals as of 20 June 2023

Vladan Bubanja (Montenegrin Cyrillic: Владан Бубања; born 21 February 1999) is a Montenegrin professional footballer who plays as a defensive midfielder for Liga I club Rapid București, on loan from Russian Premier League club Orenburg.

== Club career ==
A youth product of Sutjeska since 2009, Bubanja began his senior career with them in 2017. On 16 January 2021, he extended his contract with Sutjeska. On 16 June 2022 after 118 games and three titles with Sutjeska, he transferred to the Croatian club Lokomotiva.

On 19 July 2025, Bubanja signed with Russian Premier League club Orenburg. On 9 January 2026, he was loaned to Osijek in Croatia. On 15 May 2026, he moved on a new loan to Rapid București in Romania.

== International career ==
Bubanja is a youth international for Montenegro, having played up to the Montenegro U21s. In May 2022, he was first called up to the senior Montenegro national team for a set of UEFA Nations League matches.

== Career statistics ==
=== Club ===
As of match played 7 November 2026

Appearances and goals by club, season and competition
Club	Season	League			National cup (Note: Includes Montenegrin Cup, Croatian Cup, Bosnian Cup, Russian Cup, Cupa României)		Europe		Other		Total	
Club	Season	Division	Apps	Goals	Apps	Goals	Apps	Goals	Apps	Goals	Apps	Goals
Sutjeska Nikšić	2016–17	Montenegrin First League	2	0	0	0	—		—		2	0
Sutjeska Nikšić	2017–18	Montenegrin First League	3	0	0	0	2 (Note: Appearances in UEFA Europa League)	0	—		5	0
Sutjeska Nikšić	2018–19	Montenegrin First League	31	2	4	0	3 (Note: One appearance in UEFA Champions League, two appearances in UEFA Europa League)	0	—		38	2
Sutjeska Nikšić	2019–20	Montenegrin First League	24	1	3	0	3 (Note: Two appearances in UEFA Champions League, one appearance in UEFA Europa League)	0	—		30	1
Sutjeska Nikšić	2020–21	Montenegrin First League	13	1	2	0	0	0	—		15	1
Sutjeska Nikšić	2021–22	Montenegrin First League	32	7	4	1	4 (Note: Appearances in UEFA Conference League)	1	—		40	9
Sutjeska Nikšić	Total		105	11	13	1	12	1	—		130	13
Lokomotiva	2022–23	HNL	29	3	3	1	—		—		32	4
Lokomotiva	2023–24	HNL	26	3	1	1	—		—		27	4
Lokomotiva	Total		55	6	4	2	—		—		59	8
Sarajevo	2024–25	Bosnian Premier League	28	4	8	2	4	0	—		40	6
Orenburg	2025–26	Russian Premier League	8	0	6	1	—		—		14	1
Osijek (loan)	2025–26	HNL	17	2	—		—		—		17	2
Rapid București (loan)	2026–27	Liga I	15	1	2	1	—		—		17	2
Career total			228	24	33	7	16	1	—		277	32

=== International ===
As of match played 9 June 2023

Appearances and goals by national team and year
National team	Year	Apps	Goals
Montenegro
Montenegro	2023	1	0
Total		1	0

== Honours ==
Sutjeska Nikšić

- Montenegrin First League: 2017–18, 2018–19, 2021–22

Sarajevo

- Bosnian Cup: 2024–25
