= NK Rudeš =

Croatian football club

Rudeš
- Full name: Nogometni klub Rudeš
- Short name: RUD
- Founded: 1957; 69 years ago
- Ground: Stadion Kranjčevićeva (HNL), ŠC Rudeš (lower leagues)
- Capacity: 5,350, 1,612
- Chairman: Josip Šimunić
- Manager: Alen Peternac
- League: Croatian Football League
- 2025–26: Prva NL, 1st of 12 (promoted)
- Website: nk-rudes.hr
Home colours	Away colours

Nogometni Klub Rudeš (English: Football Club Rudeš), commonly referred to as NK Rudeš, is a Croatian football club founded in 1957 in Zagreb's neighbourhood of Rudeš. The club competes in Croatian Football League, the top tier of Croatian football.

== History ==
Being a lower league club through most of its history, Rudeš achieved promotion to the Croatian Second Football League in 2009, where it quickly established itself as one of the most stable clubs and a regular top table finisher. In the 2016–17 season, Rudeš clinched the title, earning promotion to the Croatian First Football League for the 2017–18 season.

In May 2017, Rudeš signed a ten-year partnership deal with Spanish club Deportivo Alavés, with Rudeš acting as a feeder club. However, the agreement was terminated after the first year.

== Recent seasons ==
Season	League									Cup	Top goalscorer	
Season	Division	P	W	D	L	F	A	Pts	Pos	Cup	Player	Goals
1999–00	4. HNL Zagreb (IV)	30	10	8	12	52	65	38	10th			
2000–01	4. HNL Zagreb (IV)	30	11	5	14	56	76	38	9th			
2001–02	4. HNL Zagreb (IV)	30	9	9	12	48	49	36	10th			
2002–03	4. HNL Zagreb (IV)	28	21	3	4	56	15	66	1st ↑			
2003–04	3. HNL Centre (III)	30	17	11	2	60	24	62	2nd			
2004–05	3. HNL Centre (III)	32	18	5	9	54	28	59	2nd	R1		
2005–06	3. HNL Centre (III)	30	15	4	11	52	39	49	8th			
2006–07	3. HNL West (III)	34	15	7	12	49	40	52	5th		Marko Tadić	10
2007–08	3. HNL West (III)	34	15	8	11	47	40	53	5th		Ivan Zelenika	12
2008–09	3. HNL West (III)	34	22	10	2	63	24	76	1st ↑		Igor Raić	28
2009–10	2. HNL (II)	26	10	7	9	38	38	37	7th		Igor Raić	13
2010–11	2. HNL (II)	30	15	7	8	52	39	52	4th	R1	Marko Tadić	14
2011–12	2. HNL (II)	28	11	8	9	42	33	41	6th	R2	Mario Ćubel	10
2012–13	2. HNL (II)	30	14	8	8	47	30	48	3rd		Anto Gudelj	11
2013–14	2. HNL (II)	33	14	5	14	45	36	47	4th		Miroslav Konopek	11
2014–15	2. HNL (II)	30	10	12	8	36	28	42	4th		Four players	4
2015–16	2. HNL (II)	33	12	10	11	50	43	46	5th		Ivan Jakov Džoni	8
2016–17	2. HNL (II)	34	17	9	7	43	27	60	1st ↑	R2	Tomislav Havojić	9
2017–18	1. HNL (I)	36	10	10	16	41	62	40	8th	QF	Mario Budimir	13
2018–19	1. HNL (I)	36	3	5	28	26	80	14	10th ↓		Tomislav Štrkalj	5
2019–20	2. HNL (II)	19	8	5	6	25	20	29	5th	R1	Deni Jurić	10
2020–21	2. HNL (II)	34	15	12	7	52	41	57	2nd	R2	Besart Abdurahimi	12
2021–22	2. HNL (II)	30	17	5	8	56	27	56	2nd	R2	Martin Sekulić	13
2022–23	1. NL (II)	33	19	7	7	56	26	64	1st ↑	QF	Tomislav Gudelj	11
2023–24	HNL (I)	36	1	6	29	22	85	9	10th ↓	QF	Three players	3
2024–25	1. NL (II)	33	10	9	14	31	33	39	9th	R2	Đorđe Jovanović	4
2025–26	1. NL (II)	33	19	8	6	49	29	65	1st ↑	R2	Duje Korač	9

== First-team squad ==
As of 15 October 2026

Note: Flags indicate national team as defined under FIFA eligibility rules; some limited exceptions apply. Players may hold more than one non-FIFA nationality.

No.	Pos.	Nation	Player
1	GK	CRO	Filip Holjevac
2	DF	CRO	Bruno Unušić
4	DF	CRO	Vedran Celjak (captain)
5	DF	CRO	Marko Stolnik
7	FW	CRO	Lenny Ilečić
8	MF	CRO	Luka Popović
10	MF	CRO	Vid Seitz
11	MF	CRO	Jurica Poldrugač
14	FW	CRO	Toni Kolega
19	FW	GAM	Cherno Saho (on loan from Rijeka)
20	MF	CRO	Jakov Blagaić
21	DF	CRO	Ante Sušak
23	DF	CRO	Ante Udovičić
24	MF	SRB	Ivan Đorić
25	DF	CRO	Ante Pripuz Špekuljuk
26	DF	CRO	Ivan Žutić

No.	Pos.	Nation	Player
27	DF	BRA	Felipe Curcio
28	MF	POR	Xavi
29	DF	CRO	Slavko Bralić
30	FW	CRO	Martin Šlogar
32	GK	CRO	Stipe Duvnjak
33	FW	CRO	Josip Pejić
34	FW	CRO	Kristijan Lovrić
35	FW	SUI	Josip Bralić
37	MF	CRO	Noa Skoko (on loan from Hajduk Split)
42	DF	CRO	Marko Zebić (on loan from Dinamo Zagreb)
44	DF	BIH	Filip Taraba
61	MF	CIV	Cheick Tidiane Diabate (on loan from Samsunspor)
78	FW	CHI	Junior Fernandes
88	FW	MAR	Saad El Haddad (on loan from Venezia)
89	MF	BRA	Allyson
95	GK	CRO	Lovre Rogić (vice-captain)

=== Dual registration ===
Note: Flags indicate national team as defined under FIFA eligibility rules; some limited exceptions apply. Players may hold more than one non-FIFA nationality.

No.	Pos.	Nation	Player
13	MF	CRO	Josip Radman (at Hrvatski Dragovoljac)

=== Out on loan ===
Note: Flags indicate national team as defined under FIFA eligibility rules; some limited exceptions apply. Players may hold more than one non-FIFA nationality.

No.	Pos.	Nation	Player
3	DF	CRO	Nikica Peranović (at Radnik Križevci until 26 June 2027)
22	MF	CRO	Domagoj Đurković (at Sesvete until 30 June 2027)

No.	Pos.	Nation	Player
—	DF	BIH	Dominik Čeko (at Lučko until 26 June 2027)
