= Zoran Zekić =

Croatian football manager (born 1974)

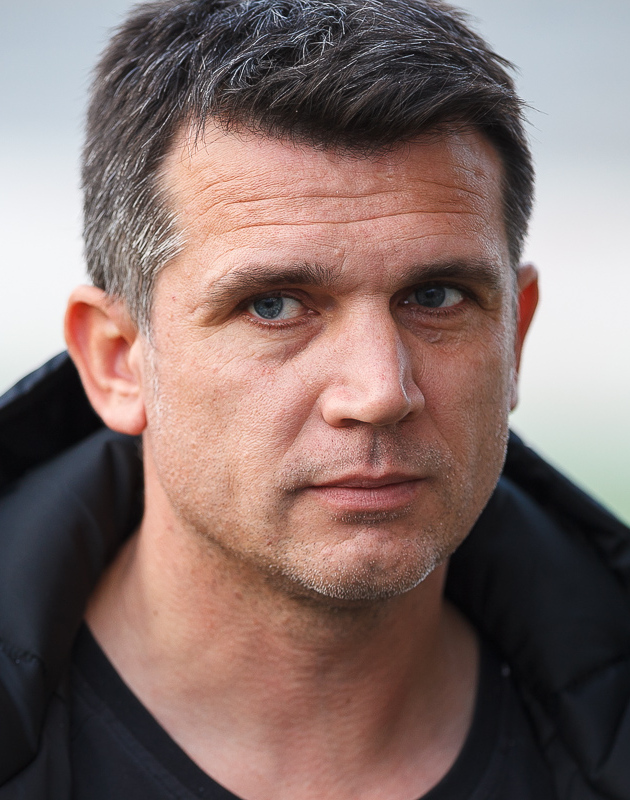
- Zekić in 2014

Personal information
- Date of birth: 29 April 1974 (age 52)
- Place of birth: Osijek, SR Croatia, SFR Yugoslavia
- Height: 1.85 m (6 ft 1 in)
- Position: Striker

Team information
- Current team: Sarajevo (manager)

Youth career
- Osijek

Senior career*
Years	Team	Apps	(Gls)
1992–1996	Osijek	6	(2)
1996–1998	Cibalia	32	(16)
1998–1999	Pfullendorf	7	(0)
2000	Otok	24	(14)
2000	Sarajevo	7	(2)
2001	Kamen Ingrad	25	(25)
2001–2002	Zadar	28	(13)
2002–2003	Kamen Ingrad	41	(27)
2004	Maccabi Haifa	9	(0)
2004	Dinamo Zagreb	5	(0)
2005	Inter Zaprešić	14	(6)
2005	Rijeka	10	(1)
2006	Inter Zaprešić	14	(1)
2006–2007	Cibalia	24	(12)
2007–2008	Istra 1961	15	(7)
2008	Segesta	10	(2)
2009	Moslavina	14	(9)
2009–2010	Lučko	16	(4)
2010–2011	Maksimir	29	(17)
Total		330	(158)

Managerial career
- 2010–2013: Maksimir
- 2013–2014: Sheriff-2 Tiraspol
- 2014–2015: Sheriff Tiraspol
- 2015–2019: Osijek
- 2019–2020: Sheriff Tiraspol
- 2021: Diósgyőr
- 2021–2023: Slaven Belupo
- 2023: Partizani
- 2023–2024: Osijek
- 2024–2025: Sarajevo
- 2026–: Sarajevo
- * Club domestic league appearances and goals

Zoran Zekić (pronounced [zǒran zěːkitɕ]; born 29 April 1974) is a Croatian professional football manager and former player who is currently the manager of Bosnian Premier League club Sarajevo.

== Managerial career ==
=== Early career ===
In July 2010, Zekić was appointed manager of Zagreb-based local football club Maksimir, which he managed until 2013. One year later he moved to Moldova, where he managed Sheriff-2 Tiraspol in 2014, after which he became Sheriff Tiraspol manager. He won the double with Sheriff in the 2014–15 season, winning the Divizia Naţională and the national cup.

=== Osijek ===
On 1 September 2015, Zekić was appointed manager of hometown club Osijek in the Croatian Prva HNL, signing a three-year contract until June 2018. In the 2016–17 season, Osijek finished in fourth place, earning a spot in the 2017–18 UEFA Europa League first qualifying rounds. Osijek drew Santa Coloma, Luzern and PSV Eindhoven. Osijek beat PSV with 2–0 on aggregate (0–1, 1–0), being promoted to the play-off round, where the club lost to Austria Wien on away goals. On 29 March 2019, following a string of poor results in the league, Zekić parted ways with Osijek.

=== Return to Sheriff Tiraspol ===
On 30 April 2019, Zekić came back to manage Sheriff Tiraspol. He led the side to another league and cup triumph, before leaving Sheriff in October 2020.

=== Diósgyőr, Slaven Belupo and Partizani ===
In January 2021, Zekić was appointed manager of Hungarian Nemzeti Bajnokság I club Diósgyőr. Following Diósgyőr, he also worked at Slaven Belupo, Partizani, before returning to Osijek.

=== Sarajevo ===
On 12 June 2024, Zekić was announced as the new manager of Bosnian Premier League club Sarajevo. He signed a two-year contract with the option of extending for a further year. In his first game in charge, Sarajevo beat Aktobe in the 2024–25 UEFA Conference League first qualifying round on 11 July 2024. Sarajevo was eliminated in the second qualifying round by Spartak Trnava 3–0 on aggregate. On 4 August 2024, Zekić earned victory in his first match of the league season, as Sarajevo defeated Sloboda Tuzla 3–1 at home. He guided the side to a cup triumph in May 2025, defeating Široki Brijeg 5–1 on aggregate in the final.

Sarajevo started off the 2025–26 season in the UEFA Conference League second qualifying round against Universitatea Craiova. Following a 2–1 victory in the first leg, Sarajevo was ultimately eliminated after suffering a 4–0 defeat in the second leg. Zekić's side started off the league season with a 4–4 draw against Radnik Bijeljina on 3 August 2025, only narrowly escaping defeat with a late equaliser despite initially being 3–0 up. Subsequently, Zekić resigned as manager on 5 August.

=== Return to Sarajevo ===
Zekić returned as Sarajevo manager on 9 June 2026, on a contract until June 2027, succeeding compatriot Mario Cvitanović.

== Managerial statistics ==
As of match played 22 November 2026

Team	From	To	Record				
Team	From	To	G	W	D	L	Win %
Sheriff Tiraspol	14 August 2014	26 May 2015	23	16	3	4	69.57
Osijek	1 September 2015	29 March 2019	152	69	40	43	45.39
Sheriff Tiraspol	30 April 2019	21 October 2020	44	34	6	4	77.27
Diósgyőr	7 January 2021	9 May 2021	20	7	5	8	35.00
Slaven Belupo	31 August 2021	30 June 2023	72	23	20	29	31.94
Partizani Tirana	12 June 2023	10 October 2023	14	7	4	3	50.00
Osijek	13 October 2023	21 May 2024	27	12	6	9	44.44
Sarajevo	12 June 2024	5 August 2025	48	25	16	7	52.08
Sarajevo	9 June 2026	Present	17	6	6	5	35.29
Total			417	199	106	112	47.72

== Honours ==
=== Player ===
Kamen Ingrad

- Druga HNL: 2000–01

Maccabi Haifa

- Israeli Premier League: 2003–04

=== Manager ===
Sheriff Tiraspol

- Divizia Naţională: 2019
- Moldovan Cup: 2014–15, 2018–19

Sarajevo

- Bosnian Cup: 2024–25
