= Croatian Cup =

Croatian Cup may refer to:

- Croatian Football Cup
- Croatian Football Super Cup
- Croatian Women's Football Cup
- Croatian Basketball Cup, also known as Krešimir Ćosić Cup
- Croatian Handball Cup
- Croatian Water Polo Cup
- Croatian Minute Movie Cup
