= 2024–25 Bosnia and Herzegovina Football Cup =

Football tournament season

29th Bosnia and Herzegovina Football Cup

Tournament details
- Country: Bosnia and Herzegovina
- Dates: 29 October 2024 – 14 May 2025
- Teams: 32

Final positions
- Champions: Sarajevo (8th title)
- Runners-up: Široki Brijeg

Tournament statistics
- Matches played: 38
- Goals scored: 113 (2.97 per match)
- Top goal scorer(s): Madžid Šošić (5 goals)

The 2024–25 Bosnia and Herzegovina Football Cup was the 29th edition of Bosnia and Herzegovina's annual football cup, and the twenty fourth season of the unified competition. The winners of the cup qualified for the 2025–26 UEFA Conference League second qualifying round.

Zrinjski Mostar were the defending champions. Sarajevo won the cup after beating Široki Brijeg in the final.

== Calendar ==
Round	Date(s)
First round	8 October 2024 (draw); 29 and 30 October, 6 and 16 November 2024
Second round	17 December 2024 (draw); 7, 8 and 9 February 2025
Quarter-finals	17 December 2024 (draw); 25 and 26 February 2025 (leg 1); 11, 12 and 22 March 2025 (leg 2)
Semi-finals	18 March 2025 (draw); 2 April 2025 (leg 1); 15 and 16 April 2025 (leg 2)
Final	21 April 2025 (draw)^{1} 7 May 2025 (leg 1); 14 May 2025 (leg 2)

^{1} Draw was held to determine which team hosted leg 1 and which team hosted leg 2.

== Bracket ==
Quarter-finals
Sarajevo	1	1	2
Zrinjski Mostar	1	0	1
Famos Vojkovići	1	0	1
Borac Banja Luka	3	2	5
Široki Brijeg	2	2	4
Velež Mostar	0	1	1
Kruševo	1	1	2
Željezničar	8	3	11

Semi-finals
Sarajevo	0	2	2
Borac Banja Luka	1	0	1
Široki Brijeg	3	0	3
Željezničar	0	1	1

Final
Sarajevo	4	1	5
Široki Brijeg	0	1	1

== First round ==
Played on 29 and 30 October, 6 and 16 November 2024.

Home team	Away team	Result
Leotar (II)	Željezničar (I)	0–3
Čelik Zenica (II)	Stupčanica (II)	2–1
Kruševo (III)	Sloboda Tuzla (I)	1–1 (3–2 p)
Mladost Solina (IV)	Igman Konjic (I)	0–2
Svatovac Poljice (III)	Velež Mostar (I)	0–2
Rudar Prijedor (II)	GOŠK Gabela (I)	1–1 (3–4 p)
Famos Hrasnica (III)	Posušje (I)	0–3
Žepče (III)	Zrinjski Mostar (I)	1–2
Bratstvo Gračanica (II)	Radnik Bijeljina (I)	0–5
Gornji Rahić (II)	Sloga Doboj (I)	0–0 (4–5 p)
Sloboda Novi Grad (II)	Sarajevo (I)	0–2
Vareš (IV)	Kozara Gradiška (II)	3–2
Zvijezda Gradačac (II)	Zvijezda 09 (II)	2–1
Famos Vojkovići (II)	Slavija Sarajevo (II)	5–2
Troglav Livno (III)	Široki Brijeg (I)	0–9
Laktaši (II)	Borac Banja Luka (I)	0–2

== Second round ==
Played on 7, 8 and 9 February 2025.

Home team	Away team	Result
Igman Konjic (I)	Zrinjski Mostar (I)	0–1
Velež Mostar (I)	Radnik Bijeljina (I)	2–1
Kruševo (III)	Zvijezda Gradačac (II)	2–0
Široki Brijeg (I)	GOŠK Gabela (I)	1–0
Željezničar (I)	Vareš (IV)	6–0
Famos Vojkovići (II)	Posušje (I)	0–0 (4–2 p)
Sarajevo (I)	Sloga Meridian (I)	3–1
Borac Banja Luka (I)	Čelik Zenica (II)	3–0

== Quarter-finals ==
First legs were played on 25 and 26 February, return legs were played on 11, 12 and 22 March 2025.

Team 1	Team 2	Leg 1	Leg 2	Agg. score
Kruševo (III)	Željezničar (I)	1–8	1–3	2–11
Sarajevo (I)	Zrinjski Mostar (I)	1–1	1–0	2–1
Famos Vojkovići (II)	Borac Banja Luka (I)	1–3	0–2	1–5
Široki Brijeg (I)	Velež Mostar (I)	2–0	2–1	4–1

== Semi-finals ==
First legs were played on 2 April, return legs were played on 15 and 16 April 2025.

Team 1	Team 2	Leg 1	Leg 2	Agg. score
Sarajevo (I)	Borac Banja Luka (I)	0–1	2–0	2–1
Široki Brijeg (I)	Željezničar (I)	3–0	0–1	3–1

== Final ==
First leg was played on 7 May, return leg was played on 14 May 2025.

Team 1	Team 2	Leg 1	Leg 2	Agg. score
Sarajevo (I)	Široki Brijeg (I)	4–0	1–1	5–1

=== First leg ===
7 May 2025
18:00 CEST (UTC+2)

Sarajevo	4–0	Široki Brijeg
Turkeš 4', 15'; Bubanja 54'; Taraba 63' (o.g.)	Report

Asim Ferhatović Hase Stadium, Sarajevo
Attendance: 8,500
Referee: Luka Bilbija (Prijedor)

=== Second leg ===
14 May 2025
21:00 CEST (UTC+2)

Široki Brijeg	1–1	Sarajevo
Stanić 89'	Report	Lulić 76'

Stadion Pecara, Široki Brijeg
Attendance: 2,500
Referee: Ermin Sivac (Zenica)
