= 2022–23 FK Sarajevo season =

Sarajevo
2022–23 season
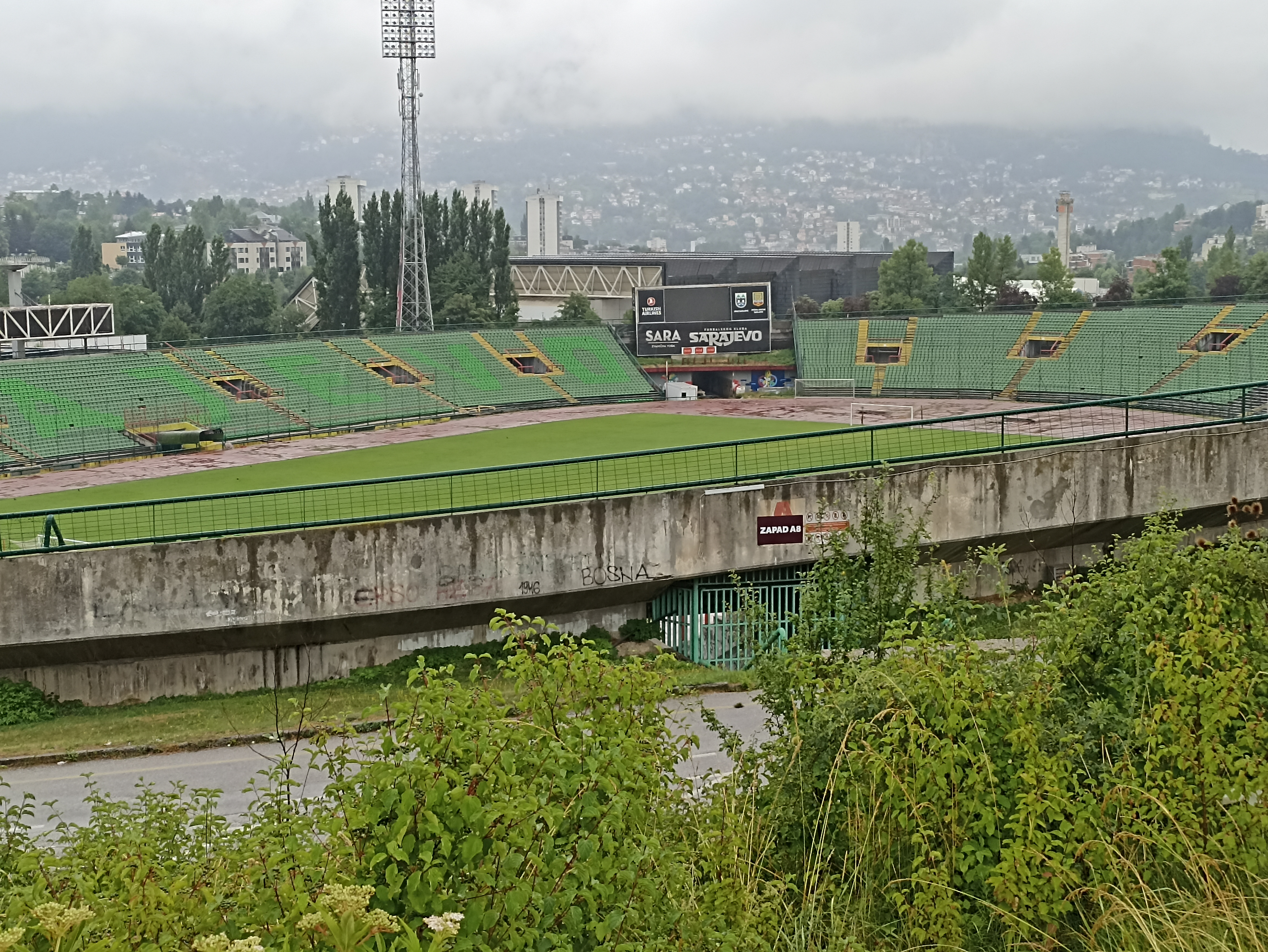
- Asim Ferhatović Hase Stadium 8.7.2022.
- Owner: Vincent Tan (60%); Ismir Mirvić (30%)
- President: Ismir Mirvić
- Manager: Feđa Dudić (until 19 October); Emir Obuća (caretaker, from 20 October to 12 December); Mirza Varešanović (from 12 December)
- Stadium: Asim Ferhatović Hase Stadium
- Bosnian Premier League: 4th
- Bosnian Cup: Round of 32
- Top goalscorer: League: Renan Oliveira (9); All: Renan Oliveira (9)
- Highest home attendance: 13,000 vs Željezničar (12 May 2023)
- Lowest home attendance: 0 (3 matches)
- Average home league attendance: 3,778
- Biggest win: Velež 3–5 Sarajevo (21 May 2023)
- Biggest defeat: Sarajevo 1–5 Tuzla City (10 August 2022)
| Home colours | Away colours | Third colours |

The 2022–23 Sarajevo season was the club's 74th season in history, and their 29th consecutive season in the top flight of Bosnian football, the Premier League of BiH. Besides competing in the Premier League, the team also competed in the National Cup.

== Squad information ==
=== First-team squad ===
As of 15 February 2023

Note: Flags indicate national team as defined under FIFA eligibility rules; some limited exceptions apply. Players may hold more than one non-FIFA nationality.

| No. | Pos. | Nation | Player |
|---|---|---|---|
| 1 | GK | BIH | Muhamed Šahinović |
| 2 | DF | NGA | Musa Muhammed |
| 3 | DF | BIH | Avdija Vršajević (3rd captain) |
| 4 | DF | BIH | Muharem Trako |
| 5 | MF | CRO | Ivan Jelić Balta (on loan from Wisła Kraków) |
| 6 | DF | BIH | Enedin Mulalić |
| 7 | FW | BIH | Hamza Čataković |
| 8 | MF | BIH | Mario Vrančić (on loan from Rijeka) |
| 9 | FW | BRA | Renan Oliveira |
| 10 | MF | BIH | Dal Varešanović (4th captain) |
| 11 | FW | GHA | Francis Kyeremeh |
| 14 | MF | BIH | Tarik Ramić |
| 17 | DF | SRB | Nemanja Tomašević |

| No. | Pos. | Nation | Player |
|---|---|---|---|
| 18 | FW | GEO | Giorgi Guliashvili |
| 19 | MF | BIH | Adnan Džafić |
| 20 | MF | BIH | Đani Salčin |
| 21 | DF | BIH | Besim Šerbečić (vice-captain) |
| 23 | DF | SRB | Slaviša Radović |
| 25 | MF | CRO | Frane Čirjak |
| 27 | MF | MKD | Daniel Avramovski |
| 28 | DF | BIH | Marin Aničić |
| 35 | GK | BIH | Belmin Dizdarević |
| 66 | DF | MNE | Ilija Martinović |
| 77 | MF | BIH | Almedin Ziljkić (captain) |
| 98 | MF | BIH | Mirza Mustafić |

=== Youth academy players ===
FK Sarajevo Academy players that received a first-team squad call-up.

| No. | Pos. | Nation | Player |
|---|---|---|---|
| 13 | GK | BIH | Arman Šutković |
| 15 | MF | BIH | Haris Ališah |
| 16 | MF | BIH | Hamza Ljukovac |
| 30 | FW | BIH | Irfan Ramić |
| 31 | MF | BIH | Bakir Nurković |

| No. | Pos. | Nation | Player |
|---|---|---|---|
| 33 | DF | BIH | Nidal Čelik |
| 40 | GK | BIH | Faris Mehić |
| 45 | FW | BIH | Nermin Bijelonja |
| 50 | MF | BIH | Muhamed Buljubašić |

== Transfers ==
=== In ===
| Date | Pos. | Player | From | Fee | Ref. |
|---|---|---|---|---|---|
| 8 June 2022 | FW | (Croatia) Ivan Ikić | (Bosnia and Herzegovina) Široki Brijeg | Free transfer | |
| 9 June 2022 | DF | (Serbia) Nemanja Tomašević | (Serbia) TSC | €30,000 | |
| 9 June 2022 | MF | (Croatia) Frane Čirjak | (Bulgaria) Lokomotiv 1929 Sofia | Free transfer | |
| 13 June 2022 | DF | (North Macedonia) Vlatko Drobarov | (Bulgaria) Cherno More Varna | Free transfer | |
| 13 June 2022 | DF | (Bosnia and Herzegovina) Marin Aničić | (Turkey) Konyaspor | Free transfer | |
| 20 June 2022 | FW | (Bosnia and Herzegovina) Nardin Mulahusejnović | (Slovenia) Mura | Undisclosed | |
| 21 June 2022 | MF | (Bosnia and Herzegovina) Adnan Džafić | (Bosnia and Herzegovina) Tuzla City | Free transfer | |
| 28 June 2022 | DF | (Nigeria) Musa Muhammed | (Croatia) Gorica | Free transfer | |
| 9 August 2022 | MF | (Ghana) Abdul Rashid Abubakar | (Ghana) Accra Lions | Free transfer | |
| 29 August 2022 | MF | (Bosnia and Herzegovina) Mirza Mustafić | (Luxembourg) Fola Esch | Free transfer | |
| 9 September 2022 | DF | (Bosnia and Herzegovina) Avdija Vršajević | (Turkey) Ümraniyespor | Free transfer | |
| 5 January 2023 | DF | (Montenegro) Ilija Martinović | (Uzbekistan) Pakhtakor Tashkent | Free transfer | |
| 12 January 2023 | FW | (Brazil) Renan Oliveira | (Ukraine) Kolos Kovalivka | €170,000 | |
| 13 January 2023 | MF | (Bosnia and Herzegovina) Almedin Ziljkić | (Slovenia) Olimpija Ljubljana | €100,000 | |
| 16 January 2023 | DF | (Serbia) Slaviša Radović | (Latvia) Liepāja | Free transfer | |
| 17 January 2023 | FW | (Georgia (country)) Giorgi Guliashvili | (Georgia (country)) Saburtalo Tbilisi | €350,000 | |
| 30 January 2023 | FW | (Ghana) Francis Kyeremeh | (Lithuania) Žalgiris | Free transfer | |
| 7 February 2023 | DF | (Bosnia and Herzegovina) Besim Šerbečić | (Norway) Aalesunds | €200,000 | |
| Total | | | | €850,000 | |

=== Out ===
| Date | Pos. | Player | To | Fee | Ref. |
|---|---|---|---|---|---|
| 3 June 2022 | FW | (Croatia) Dražen Bagarić | (Finland) Honka | End of contract | |
| 3 June 2022 | FW | (Austria) Darko Bodul | (Bosnia and Herzegovina) Igman Konjic | End of contract | |
| 3 June 2022 | FW | (Montenegro) Boris Cmiljanić | Free agent | End of contract | |
| 16 June 2022 | DF | (Serbia) Darko Lazić | (Bosnia and Herzegovina) Borac Banja Luka | End of contract | |
| 27 June 2022 | MF | (Bosnia and Herzegovina) Kerim Palić | (Uzbekistan) Metallurg Bekabad | Contract termination | |
| 27 June 2022 | GK | (Bosnia and Herzegovina) Adnan Kanurić | (England) Nottingham Forest | Contract termination | |
| 27 June 2022 | DF | (Bosnia and Herzegovina) Dino Islamović | (Bosnia and Herzegovina) TOŠK Tešanj | Contract termination | |
| 27 June 2022 | MF | (Bosnia and Herzegovina) Faruk Hodžić | (Hungary) Fehérvár II | Contract termination | |
| 29 June 2022 | MF | (Bosnia and Herzegovina) Halid Šabanović | (France) Angers | €300,000 | |
| 8 July 2022 | MF | (Croatia) Mirko Oremuš | Free agent | Contract termination | |
| 12 July 2022 | MF | (Bosnia and Herzegovina) Adnan Šećerović | (India) RoundGlass Punjab | Contract termination | |
| 12 July 2022 | MF | (Bosnia and Herzegovina) Anel Hebibović | (Bosnia and Herzegovina) Igman Konjic | Contract termination | |
| 12 July 2022 | DF | (Croatia) Vicko Ševelj | (Slovenia) Radomlje | Undisclosed | |
| 19 July 2022 | MF | (Bosnia and Herzegovina) Haris Konjalić | (Bosnia and Herzegovina) Goražde | End of contract | |
| 27 July 2022 | FW | (North Macedonia) Krste Velkoski | (North Macedonia) Rabotnički | Contract termination | |
| 2 August 2022 | DF | (Bosnia and Herzegovina) Nihad Mujakić | (Turkey) Ankaragücü | €500,000 | |
| 22 August 2022 | MF | (Bosnia and Herzegovina) Rifet Kapić | Free agent | Contract termination | |
| 7 November 2022 | MF | (Bosnia and Herzegovina) Rijad Kobiljar | Free agent | Contract termination | |
| 21 November 2022 | DF | (North Macedonia) Vlatko Drobarov | Free agent | Contract termination | |
| 22 November 2022 | FW | (Bosnia and Herzegovina) Nardin Mulahusejnović | (Russia) Dynamo Makhachkala | Contract termination | |
| 14 December 2022 | MF | (Ghana) Abdul Rashid Abubakar | (Serbia) Loznica | Contract termination | |
| 22 January 2023 | FW | (Bosnia and Herzegovina) Mersudin Ahmetović | (Bosnia and Herzegovina) Igman Konjic | Contract termination | |
| 3 February 2023 | MF | (Bosnia and Herzegovina) Andrej Đokanović | (Turkey) Ankaragücü | €760,000 | |
| 10 February 2023 | MF | (Bosnia and Herzegovina) Asmir Suljić | (Kazakhstan) Tobol | Contract termination | |
| Total | | | | €1,560,000 | |

=== Loans in ===
| Start date | End date | Pos. | Player | From | Ref. |
|---|---|---|---|---|---|
| 1 February 2023 | End of season | MF | (Croatia) Ivan Jelić Balta | (Poland) Wisła Kraków | |
| 15 February 2023 | End of season | MF | (Bosnia and Herzegovina) Mario Vrančić | (Croatia) Rijeka | |

=== Loans out ===
| Start date | End date | Pos. | Player | To | Ref. |
|---|---|---|---|---|---|
| 1 July 2022 | End of season | DF | (Bosnia and Herzegovina) Amer Dupovac | (Bosnia and Herzegovina) Igman Konjic | |
| 13 July 2022 | End of season | DF | (Bosnia and Herzegovina) Hamza Bešić | (Bosnia and Herzegovina) Stupčanica Olovo | |
| 15 July 2022 | End of season | MF | (Bosnia and Herzegovina) Salih Viteškić | (Bosnia and Herzegovina) Mladost Doboj Kakanj | |
| 15 July 2022 | End of season | DF | (Bosnia and Herzegovina) Mihajlo Jovašević | (Bosnia and Herzegovina) Mladost Doboj Kakanj | |
| 22 July 2022 | End of season | DF | (Bosnia and Herzegovina) Armin Imamović | (Bosnia and Herzegovina) Rudar Kakanj | |
| 29 January 2023 | End of season | FW | (Bosnia and Herzegovina) Kenan Dervišagić | (Bosnia and Herzegovina) Gradina | |
| 8 February 2023 | End of season | FW | (Croatia) Ivan Ikić | (Turkey) Gençlerbirliği | |

== Kit ==
| Supplier | Sponsor | |
|---|---|---|
| (Italy) Erreà | (Turkey) Turkish Airlines | Front |
| (Italy) Erreà | (Bosnia and Herzegovina) BH Telecom | Back |

== Pre-season and friendlies ==
Win Draw Loss Fixtures

| 23 June 2022 Friendly | Sarajevo (Bosnia and Herzegovina) | 7–1 | (Montenegro) Iskra Danilovgrad | Sarajevo |
| 18:30 CEST (UTC+2) | Varešanović 6'; Suljić 27'; Čataković 37'; Ikić 71'; Mulahusejnović 73', 82'; Džafić 85' | Report | | Stadium: Asim Ferhatović Hase Stadium; Attendance: 4,000 |

| 29 June 2022 Friendly | Sarajevo (Bosnia and Herzegovina) | 1–1 | (Serbia) TSC Bačka Topola | Rogaška Slatina, Slovenia |
| 18:00 CEST (UTC+2) | Suljić 77' (pen.) | Report | Mirčevski 12' | Stadium: Rogaška Slatina Sports Centre |

| 5 July 2022 Friendly | Celje (Slovenia) | 2–0 | (Bosnia and Herzegovina) Sarajevo | Celje, Slovenia |
| 18:30 CEST (UTC+2) | Zec 18'; Vuklišević 37' | Report | | Stadium: Stadion Z'dežele |

| 10 July 2022 Friendly | Sarajevo (Bosnia and Herzegovina) | 6–0 | (Bosnia and Herzegovina) GOŠK Gabela | Sarajevo |
| 18:30 CEST (UTC+2) | Čataković 10'; Suljić 55', 84'; Šuta 63' (o.g.); Ahmetović 86'; Muhammed 87' | Report | | Stadium: Asim Ferhatović Hase Stadium |

| 2 August 2022 Friendly | Travnik (Bosnia and Herzegovina) | 0–4 | (Bosnia and Herzegovina) Sarajevo | Travnik |
| 18:00 CEST (UTC+2) | | Report | Ikić 65'; Pramenković 78', 90'; Bijelonja 83' | Stadium: Stadion Pirota |

| 21 January 2023 Friendly | Međugorje (Bosnia and Herzegovina) | 0–4 | (Bosnia and Herzegovina) Sarajevo | Međugorje |
| 15:30 CET (UTC+1) | | | Trako 33'; Oliveira 46' | Stadium: Sport Centar Međugorje |

| 25 January 2023 Friendly | Sarajevo (Bosnia and Herzegovina) | 5–1 | (Bosnia and Herzegovina) Famos Hrasnica | Međugorje |
| 15:30 CET (UTC+1) | Džafić 46'; Ališah 60'; Čataković 64'; Guliashvili 82', 88' | | | Stadium: Sport Centar Međugorje |

| 4 February 2023 Friendly | Sarajevo (Bosnia and Herzegovina) | 2–1 | (Ukraine) Mynai | Antalya, Turkey |
| 15:00 TRT (UTC+3) | Ramić 77'; Kyeremeh 82' |

| 8 February 2023 Friendly | Shakhtar Donetsk (Ukraine) | 4–0 | (Bosnia and Herzegovina) Sarajevo | Antalya, Turkey |
| 17:30 TRT (UTC+3) | | | | Stadium: Titanic Mardan Palace |

| 12 February 2023 Friendly | Sarajevo (Bosnia and Herzegovina) | 1–2 | (Latvia) Riga | Antalya, Turkey |
| 17:30 TRT (UTC+3) | Almedin Ziljkić 79' (pen.) |

| 15 February 2023 Friendly | Sarajevo (Bosnia and Herzegovina) | 0–1 | (Romania) Politehnica Iași | Antalya, Turkey |
| 15:00 TRT (UTC+3) |

| 18 February 2023 Friendly | Sarajevo (Bosnia and Herzegovina) | 2–0 | (Latvia) Riga | Antalya, Turkey |
| 18:00 TRT (UTC+3) | Oliveira 71'; Čataković 87' |

| 3 April 2023 Friendly | Igman Ilidža (Bosnia and Herzegovina) | 0–10 | (Bosnia and Herzegovina) Sarajevo | Ilidža |
| 16:00 CEST (UTC+2) | | Report | Kyeremeh 32', 42'; Džafić; Guliashvili; Čirjak 25'; Oliveira 33'; Varešanović 60'; Mustafić | Stadium: Josip Škija Katalinski Stadium |

== Competitions ==
=== Overview ===
| Competition | First match | Last match | Starting round | Final position | Record | | | | | | | |
| Competition | First match | Last match | Starting round | Final position | Pld | W | D | L | GF | GA | GD | Win % |
|---|---|---|---|---|---|---|---|---|---|---|---|---|
| Bosnian Premier League | 24 July 2022 | 28 May 2023 | Matchday 1 | 4th | 33 | 15 | 7 | 11 | 50 | 46 | +4 | 45.45 |
| Bosnian Cup | 19 October 2022 | 19 October 2022 | First round | First round | 1 | 0 | 1 | 0 | 1 | 1 | +0 | 0.00 |
| Total | | | | | 34 | 15 | 8 | 11 | 51 | 47 | +4 | 44.12 |

Source: Competitions

=== Premier League of Bosnia and Herzegovina ===
==== League table ====
| Pos | Team | Pld | W | D | L | GF | GA | GD | Pts | Qualification or relegation |
|---|---|---|---|---|---|---|---|---|---|---|
| 2 | Borac Banja Luka | 33 | 18 | 4 | 11 | 39 | 32 | +7 | 58 | Qualification to Europa Conference League second qualifying round |
| 3 | Željezničar | 33 | 15 | 8 | 10 | 42 | 35 | +7 | 53 | Qualification to Europa Conference League first qualifying round |
| 4 | Sarajevo | 33 | 15 | 7 | 11 | 50 | 46 | +4 | 52 | Qualification to Europa Conference League first qualifying round |
| 5 | Široki Brijeg | 33 | 13 | 9 | 11 | 38 | 36 | +2 | 48 | |
| 6 | Velež Mostar | 33 | 11 | 12 | 10 | 40 | 37 | +3 | 45 | |

Source: Rezultati.com
Rules for classification: 1) Points; 2) Goal difference; 3) Goals scored; 4) Head-to-head points; 5) Head-to-head goal difference; 6) Head-to-head away goals (only if two teams); 7) Head-to-head goals scored; 8) Goal difference; 9) Play-off. (Criteria 2 and 3 are not used to decide champion, UEFA competition qualification, or relegation)

==== Results summary ====
| Overall | | | | | | | | Home | | | | | | Away | | | | | |
| Pld | W | D | L | GF | GA | GD | Pts | W | D | L | GF | GA | GD | W | D | L | GF | GA | GD |
|---|---|---|---|---|---|---|---|---|---|---|---|---|---|---|---|---|---|---|---|
| 33 | 15 | 7 | 11 | 50 | 46 | +4 | 52 | 8 | 5 | 4 | 25 | 21 | +4 | 7 | 2 | 7 | 25 | 25 | 0 |

Source: Sportsport.ba

==== Results by round ====
| Round | 1 | 2 | 3 | 4 | 5 | 6 | 7 | 8 | 9 | 10 | 11 | 12 | 13 | 14 | 15 | 16 | 17 | 18 | 19 | 20 | 21 | 22 | 23 | 24 | 25 | 26 | 27 | 28 | 29 | 30 | 31 | 32 | 33 |
|---|---|---|---|---|---|---|---|---|---|---|---|---|---|---|---|---|---|---|---|---|---|---|---|---|---|---|---|---|---|---|---|---|---|
| Ground | H | A | H | H | A | H | A | H | A | H | A | A | H | A | A | H | A | H | A | H | A | H | H | A | H | A | H | A | H | A | H | A | H |
| Result | L | W | W | W | L | D | D | W | L | D | D | L | W | L | W | W | L | D | L | L | W | L | W | W | D | W | W | W | W | L | D | W | L |
| Position | 12 | 6 | 4 | 2 | 3 | 5 | 5 | 3 | 6 | 5 | 6 | 6 | 6 | 7 | 5 | 5 | 5 | 5 | 5 | 6 | 6 | 6 | 6 | 6 | 6 | 6 | 4 | 3 | 3 | 3 | 3 | 3 | 4 |

Source: Competitions
A = Away; H = Home; W = Win; D = Draw; L = Loss

==== Matches ====
| 24 July 2022 2 | Borac Banja Luka | 1–3 | Sarajevo | Novi Grad |
| 17:00 CEST (UTC+2) | Subić (yellow card) 44'; Piščević (yellow card) 56'; Mrkaić 70' | Report | Varešanović 47'; Mujakić (yellow card) 65'; Čirjak (yellow card) 75'; Kobiljar 76', (yellow card) 90'; Ikić 87' | Stadium: Stadion Mlakve; Attendance: 2,700; Referee: Antoni Bandić (Grude) |
Note: Sarajevo manager Feđa Dudić was cautioned (yellow card) in the 40th minute.

| 30 July 2022 3 | Sarajevo | 4–2 | Sloga Doboj | Sarajevo |
| 21:00 CEST (UTC+2) | Mulahusejnović 49'; Ikić 59'; Džafić 64', (yellow card) 85'; Ahmetović 89' | Report | Stevanović 3'; Stapić (yellow card) 11'; Kujundžić (yellow card) 17'; Šaula (yellow card) 43'; Hasanbegović (yellow card) 78'; Dadić 85' | Stadium: Asim Ferhatović Hase Stadium; Attendance: 8,500; Referee: Mateo Musa (Čitluk) |

| 6 August 2022 4 | Sarajevo | 1–0 | Posušje | Sarajevo |
| 21:00 CEST (UTC+2) | Kobiljar (yellow card) 68'; Suljić (yellow card) 80'; Ahmetović 84' | Report | Dadić (yellow card) 18'; Hanuljak (yellow card) 76'; Bešlić (yellow card) 80'; Lučić (yellow card) 90' | Stadium: Asim Ferhatović Hase Stadium; Attendance: 9,000; Referee: Sabrija Topalović (Zenica) |

| 10 August 2022 1 (Note: Match of Round 1 postponed because of Tuzla City's participation in UEFA Europa Conference League first qualifying round.) | Sarajevo | 1–5 | Tuzla City | Zenica |
| 20:00 CEST (UTC+2) | Drobarov (yellow card) 23'; Tomašević (yellow card) 42'; Čataković 90+2' | Report | Mehidić 9', (yellow card) 9'; Coulibaly (yellow card) 17', (goal) 46'; Mišić 42' (pen.); Karjašević (yellow card) 53'; Karić (yellow card) 61'; Đokanović 82' (o.g.); Smajlagić 90' | Stadium: Bilino Polje Stadium; Attendance: 4,500; Referee: Mateo Musa (Čitluk) |

| 14 August 2022 5 | Igman Konjic | 2–0 | Sarajevo | Doboj |
| 17:30 CEST (UTC+2) | Hrelja 27'; Ramić (yellow card) 28'; Bešagić (yellow card) 35'; Bodul (yellow card) 36' (yellow-red card) 55'; Mahmić (yellow card) 38'; Jakupović (yellow card) 45', (goal) 54'; Hebibović (yellow card) 55'; Blagojević (yellow card) 84' (yellow-red card) 90'; Ćeman (yellow card) 85' | Report | Đokanović (yellow card) 13' | Stadium: MGM Farm Arena; Attendance: 1,100; Referee: Dragan Kesić (Gradiška) |
Note: Sarajevo manager Feđa Dudić was cautioned (yellow card) in the 28th minute.

| 19 August 2022 6 | Sarajevo | 1–1 | Sloboda Tuzla | Zenica |
| 20:00 CEST (UTC+2) | Mulahusejnović (yellow card) 36', (goal) 51'; T. Ramić (yellow card) 59' | Report | Komazec 16'; Vošnjak (yellow card) 22'; Osmić (yellow card) 34'; Mehmedović (yellow card) 80'; Jarović (yellow card) 90' | Stadium: Bilino Polje Stadium; Attendance: 2,200; Referee: Antoni Bandić (Grude) |

| 26 August 2022 7 | Željezničar | 2–2 | Sarajevo | Sarajevo |
| 20:00 CEST (UTC+2) | Santos (yellow card) 37'; Cocalić (yellow card) 40'; Štilić (yellow card) 83'; Haračić 88'; Bekrić 90+6', (yellow card) 90+8' | Report | Muhammed (yellow card) 16', (goal) 76'; Čirjak (yellow card) 34' (yellow-red card) 45'; Varešanović (yellow card) 40'; Ikić 48' (pen.); Šahinović (yellow card) 90'; Drobarov (yellow card) 90+2'; Đokanović (yellow card) 90+5' | Stadium: Grbavica Stadium; Attendance: 11,500; Referee: Admir Šehović (Sarajevo) |

| 30 August 2022 8 | Sarajevo | 3–0 | Leotar | Zenica |
| 20:00 CEST (UTC+2) | Ikić 19'; Mulahusejnović 22'; Varešanović 73'; Trako (yellow card) 86' | Report | Cvetković (yellow card) 9' | Stadium: Bilino Polje Stadium; Attendance: 0 Referee: Aleksandar Njegomirović (Prnjavor) |

| 4 September 2022 9 | Zrinjski Mostar | 4–1 | Sarajevo | Mostar |
| 19:00 CEST (UTC+2) | Bilbija 22' (pen.), 67'; Savić 31'; Ćuže 40'; Barišić (yellow card) 64' | Report | Varešanović 16', (yellow card) 21'; T. Ramić (yellow card) 44'; Džafić (yellow card) 59'; Čataković (yellow card) 64'; Mustafić (yellow card) 90' | Stadium: Stadion pod Bijelim Brijegom; Attendance: 3,000; Referee: Luka Bilbija (Prijedor) |

| 11 September 2022 10 | Sarajevo | 0–0 | Široki Brijeg | Zenica |
| 19:00 CEST (UTC+2) | Džafić (yellow card) 22'; Đokanović (yellow card) 24'; Mulahusejnović (yellow card) 47'; Čirjak (yellow card) 81' | Report | Kpan (yellow card) 30'; Vukoja (yellow card) 35'; Lukić (yellow card) 47'; Barišić (yellow card) 88' | Stadium: Bilino Polje Stadium; Attendance: 1,500; Referee: Mirza Kazlagić (Cazin) |

| 19 September 2022 11 | Velež Mostar | 1–1 | Sarajevo | Gabela |
| 16:00 CEST (UTC+2) | Kvakić (yellow card) 16'; Ovčina (yellow card) 18'; Zeljković (yellow card) 19'; Zajmović 56'; Ikić (yellow card) 82' | Report | Čirjak (yellow card) 21'; Suljić (yellow card) 27'; Varešanović (yellow card) 31'; Vršajević (yellow card) 59'; Ikić 75'; Abubakar (yellow card) 83' | Stadium: Stadium Perica-Pero Pavlović; Attendance: 2,000; Referee: Irfan Peljto (Sarajevo) |
Note: Sarajevo sporting director Emir Hadžić was cautioned (yellow card) in the 76th minute.

| 30 September 2022 12 | Tuzla City | 1–0 | Sarajevo | Srebrenik |
| 15:00 CEST (UTC+2) | Smajlagić 55'; Mišić (yellow card) 61'; Karjašević (yellow card) 85' | Report | Ikić (yellow card) 45+2'; Drobarov (yellow card) 62'; Mulahusejnović (yellow card) 85'; Kobiljar (yellow card) 90' | Stadium: Gradski stadion Srebrenik; Attendance: 800; Referee: Dragan Petrović (Banja Luka) |
Note: Sarajevo manager Feđa Dudić was cautioned (yellow card) in the 90th minute.

| 8 October 2022 13 | Sarajevo | 1–0 | Borac Banja Luka | Zenica |
| 17:00 CEST (UTC+2) | Ikić (yellow card) 14'; Mustafić (yellow card) 55'; Varešanović 58'; Džafić (yellow card) 90+4' | Report | Andrić (yellow card) 76'; Subić (yellow card) 90' | Stadium: Bilino Polje Stadium; Attendance: 1,500; Referee: Mateo Musa (Čitluk) |
Note: Sarajevo sporting director Emir Hadžić and assistant manager Emir Obuća were cautioned (yellow card) in the 83rd and the 89th minute, respectively.

| 14 October 2022 14 | Sloga Doboj | 1–0 | Sarajevo | Modriča |
| 18:00 CEST (UTC+2) | Kujundžić (yellow card) 30'; Zajić (yellow card) 32'; Basrak 74', (yellow card) 74'; Popara (yellow card) 82' | Report | Mulahusejnović (yellow card) 62'; Suljić (yellow card) 74'; Varešanović (yellow card) 79'; Trako (yellow card) 82' | Stadium: Stadion Dr. Milan Jelić; Attendance: 700; Referee: Aleksandar Njegomirović (Prnjavor) |
Note: Sarajevo assistant manager Mustafa Kodro was sent off (red card) .

| 23 October 2022 15 | Posušje | 0–1 | Sarajevo | Posušje |
| 14:30 CEST (UTC+2) | Vukoja (yellow card) 15'; Hanuljak (yellow card) 22'; Krešić (red card) 31'; Krišto (yellow card) 79' | Report | Ikić (yellow card) 36'; Čataković 49' | Stadium: Mokri Dolac Stadium; Attendance: 3,000; Referee: Ermin Sivac (Zenica) |

| 30 October 2022 16 | Sarajevo | 3–1 | Igman Konjic | Zenica |
| 17:00 CET (UTC+1) | Čataković 13'; Džafić 64'; Suljić (yellow card) 87'; Mustafić 90+3' | Report | Alagić 42', (yellow card) 52'; Hebibović (yellow card) 65'; Bodul (yellow card) 90' | Stadium: Bilino Polje Stadium; Attendance: 1,000; Referee: Sabrija Topalović (Zenica) |

| 5 November 2022 17 | Sloboda Tuzla | 2–0 | Sarajevo | Banovići |
| 13:00 CET (UTC+1) | Mehmedović 12'; Delić (yellow card) 44'; Osmanković (yellow card) 57'; Kapetanović 12' | Report | Džafić (yellow card) 19'; Mulalić (yellow card) 87' | Stadium: Stadion FK Budućnost; Attendance: 800; Referee: Dragan Petrović (Banja Luka) |

| 20 November 2022 19 | Leotar | 2–0 | Sarajevo | Trebinje |
| 13:00 CET (UTC+1) | Karić (yellow card) 25'; Pervan 48', 60'; Đajić (yellow card) 57' | Report | Abubakar (yellow card) 22' | Stadium: Police Stadium; Attendance: 1,000; Referee: Ermin Sivac (Zenica) |

| 26 February 2023 20 | Sarajevo | 0–2 | Zrinjski Mostar | Mostar |
| 17:30 CET (UTC+1) | Kyeremeh (yellow card) 40'; Varešanović (yellow card) 55'; Vršajević (yellow card) 71'; Vrančić (yellow card) 80'; Jelić Balta (yellow card) 87' | Report | Tičinović 33'; Bilbija 73'; Marić (yellow card) 86' | Stadium: Stadion Rođeni; Attendance: 0 Referee: Luka Bilbija (Prijedor) |

| 5 March 2023 21 | Široki Brijeg | 1–3 | Sarajevo | Široki Brijeg |
| 16:00 CET (UTC+1) | Souza (yellow card) 44'; Lovrić (yellow card) 45'; Lukić (yellow card) 51'; Vukoja 90+2' (pen.) | Report | Čataković 5'; Tomašević (yellow card) 12'; Ziljkić 45+1' (pen.); Šerbečić (yellow card) 54'; Oliveira 79'; Mulalić (yellow card) 81'; Jelić Balta (yellow card) 90+1' | Stadium: Stadion Pecara; Attendance: 3,100; Referee: Ermin Sivac (Zenica) |

| 8 March 2023 18 (Note: Match of Round 18 postponed because of new pitch being constructed at the Asim Ferhatović Hase Stadium.) | Sarajevo | 0–0 | Željezničar | Zenica |
| 13:00 CET (UTC+1) | Džafić (yellow card) 78' | Report | Galić (yellow card) 26'; Beganović (yellow card) 65'; Kosorić (yellow card) 69' | Stadium: Bosnia and Herzegovina FA Training Centre; Attendance: 0 Referee: Admir Musić (Sarajevo) |

| 12 March 2023 22 | Sarajevo | 0–1 | Velež Mostar | Doboj |
| 15:00 CET (UTC+1) | Ziljkić (yellow card) 45+1'; Šerbečić (yellow card) 56'; Mustafić (yellow card) 70' | Report | Vehabović (yellow card) 19'; Haskić (yellow card) 47'; Šikalo (yellow card) 61'; Martinović 73' (o.g.); Muminović (yellow card) 82'; Hadžikić (yellow card) 90' | Stadium: MGM Farm Arena; Attendance: 3,000; Referee: Dragan Petrović (Banja Luka) |

| 20 March 2023 23 | Sarajevo | 3–1 | Posušje | Doboj |
| 13:00 CET (UTC+1) | Čataković 60' (pen.); Martinović 65'; Ziljkić 83' | Report | Begić (yellow card) 36'; Brković (yellow card) 39'; Maglica (yellow card) 54'; Bešlić (yellow card) 59'; Dadić (yellow card) 78'; Marković 90' | Stadium: MGM Farm Arena; Attendance: 500; Referee: Dražen Marić (Bijeljina) |

| 2 April 2023 24 | Sloboda Tuzla | 2–3 | Sarajevo | Tuzla |
| 16:00 CEST (UTC+2) | Bekić 8', 14'; Čivić (yellow card) 62'; Kapetanović (yellow card) 75' | Report | Ziljkić 33'; Čataković 35'; Guliashvili (yellow card) 41'; Jelić Balta (yellow card) 43'; Martinović (yellow card) 43'; Radović (yellow card) 61'; Avramovski 73', (yellow card) 74' | Stadium: Tušanj City Stadium; Attendance: 6,000; Referee: Antoni Bandić (Grude) |

| 7 April 2023 25 | Sarajevo | 1–1 | Sloga Doboj | Zenica |
| 20:00 CEST (UTC+2) | Kyeremeh 16'; Ziljkić (yellow card) 65'; Martinović (yellow card) 72'; Tomašević (yellow card) 90' | Report | Dadić 48', (yellow card) 72'; Starčević (yellow card) 87', Gučmazov (yellow card) 90+2' | Stadium: Bilino Polje Stadium; Attendance: 600; Referee: Elvedin Topuzović (Tuzla) |

| 15 April 2023 26 | Leotar | 0–3 | Sarajevo | Trebinje |
| 16:00 CEST (UTC+2) | Šipovac (yellow card) 45'; Milović (yellow card) 71' | Report | Ziljkić 31'; Vrančić (yellow card) 35'; Čataković (yellow card) 40'; Avramovski (yellow card) 44'; Martinović 59'; Mulalić (yellow card) 72'; Dizdarević (yellow card) 79'; Oliveira (yellow card) 79', (goal) 85'; Varešanović (yellow card) 88' | Stadium: Police Stadium; Attendance: 1,250; Referee: Dražen Marić (Bijeljina) |

| 23 April 2023 27 | Sarajevo | 1–0 | Tuzla City | Sarajevo |
| 18:00 CEST (UTC+2) | Avramovski 28', (yellow card) 79'; Ziljkić (yellow card) 82' (yellow-red card) 90'; Vrančić (yellow card) 82' | Report | Karić (yellow card) 38' | Stadium: Koševo City Stadium; Attendance: 7,300; Referee: Ermin Sivac (Zenica) |

| 26 April 2023 28 | Zrinjski Mostar | 2–3 | Sarajevo | Čitluk |
| 16:00 CEST (UTC+2) | Barišić (yellow card) 31' (yellow-red card) 90+4'; Sučić (yellow card) 38'; Ćuže 44'; Bekić (yellow card) 65'; Jukić 84' | Report | Oliveira 14', 63'; Kyeremeh (yellow card) 45+1'; Varešanović 52'; Radović (yellow card) 62' | Stadium: Stadion Bare; Attendance: 2,500; Referee: Irfan Peljto (Sarajevo) |

| 29 April 2023 29 | Sarajevo | 2–1 | Široki Brijeg | Sarajevo |
| 20:30 CEST (UTC+2) | Oliveira 2'; Radović (yellow card) 63'; Varešanović 84', (yellow card) 88'; Čirjak (yellow card) 90+3' | Report | Radić 23', (yellow card) 34'; Lovrić (yellow card) 65'; Pranjić (yellow card) 88' | Stadium: Koševo City Stadium; Attendance: 6,500; Referee: Miloš Gigović (Gradiška) |

| 7 May 2023 30 | Borac Banja Luka | 1–0 | Sarajevo | Banja Luka |
| 19:30 CEST (UTC+2) | Račić (yellow card) 69'; Mrkaić (yellow card) 83'; Predragović 87'; Blagaić (yellow card) 90' | Report | Trako (yellow card) 22' (yellow-red card) 45'; Muhammed (yellow card) 28'; Jelić Balta (yellow card) 60' | Stadium: Banja Luka City Stadium; Attendance: 4,500; Referee: Miloš Gigović (Gradiška) |
Note: Sarajevo manager Mirza Varešanović was sent off (yellow card) (yellow-red card) in the 83rd minute after being cautioned (yellow card) in the 57th minute. Sarajevo equipment manager Mustafa Beridan was sent off (red card) in the 83rd minute.

| 12 May 2023 31 | Sarajevo | 2–2 | Željezničar | Sarajevo |
| 20:00 CEST (UTC+2) | Varešanović 35'; Jelić Balta (yellow card) 42'; Muhammed (yellow card) 44'; Šerbečić (yellow card) 71'; Oliveira 75'; T. Ramić (red card) 90+4' | Report | Mekić (yellow card) 42'; Hodžić (yellow card) 42'; Drina (yellow card) 66'; Jašarević 79'; Krpić 90+6' | Stadium: Koševo City Stadium; Attendance: 13,000; Referee: Irfan Peljto (Sarajevo) |
Note: Sarajevo assistant managers Senad Repuh and Emir Obuća were cautioned (yellow card) in the 44th and the 69th minute, respectively.

| 21 May 2023 32 | Velež Mostar | 3–5 | Sarajevo | Mostar |
| 17:00 CEST (UTC+2) | Anđušić 4'; Haskić 74'; Sijamija 87' (pen.) | Report | Varešanović 11'; Ziljkić 24'; Trako (yellow card) 36'; Oliveira (yellow card) 38', (goal) 57', 75', 83' (pen.); Mulalić (yellow card) 66' | Stadium: Stadion Rođeni; Attendance: 3,500; Referee: Dragan Petrović (Banja Luka) |

| 28 May 2023 33 | Sarajevo | 2–4 | Igman Konjic | Sarajevo |
| 17:00 CEST (UTC+2) | Vrančić 2'; Mulalić 27'; Jelić Balta (yellow card) 58'; Ziljkić (yellow card) 68'; Mustafić (yellow card) 71' | Report | Ramić 10', 39', (yellow card) 60'; Hebibović 14'; Mahmić (yellow card) 55'; Denković 68'; Velić (yellow card) 85' | Stadium: Koševo City Stadium; Attendance: 5,000; Referee: Antoni Bandić (Grude) |

=== Cup of Bosnia and Herzegovina ===
==== Round of 32 ====
| 19 October 2022 | Čelik Zenica | 1–1 (5–4 p) | Sarajevo | Zenica |
| 18:00 CEST (UTC+2) | Isaković (yellow card) 15'; Durmiš 57'; Mlačo (yellow card) 73'; Žuna (yellow card) 83'; Kolić (yellow card) 85'; Karalić (yellow card) 90' | Report | Čataković 35'; Suljić (yellow card) 90+4' | Stadium: Bilino Polje Stadium; Attendance: 9,000; Referee: Elvedin Topuzović (Tuzla) |
| | Penalties |
| | Durmiš (penalty scored); Žuna (penalty scored); Vardo (penalty scored); Sivac (penalty scored); Isaković (penalty scored) | | (penalty scored) Ikić; (penalty scored) Čataković; (penalty scored) Ahmetović; (penalty missed) Mustafić; (penalty scored) Trako |

== Statistics ==
=== Appearances and goals ===
| No. | Pos | Nat | Player | Total | | Bosnian Premier League | | Bosnian Cup | |
| No. | Pos | Nat | Player | Apps | Goals | Apps | Goals | Apps | Goals |
Goalkeepers
| 1 | GK | (Bosnia and Herzegovina) BIH | Muhamed Šahinović | 18 | 0 | 18 | 0 | 0 | 0 |
| 13 | GK | (Bosnia and Herzegovina) BIH | Arman Šutković | 0 | 0 | 0 | 0 | 0 | 0 |
| 35 | GK | (Bosnia and Herzegovina) BIH | Belmin Dizdarević | 16 | 0 | 15 | 0 | 1 | 0 |
| 40 | GK | (Bosnia and Herzegovina) BIH | Faris Mehić | 0 | 0 | 0 | 0 | 0 | 0 |
Defenders
| 2 | DF | (Nigeria) NGA | Musa Muhammed | 15 | 1 | 14+1 | 1 | 0 | 0 |
| 3 | DF | (Bosnia and Herzegovina) BIH | Avdija Vršajević | 5 | 0 | 5 | 0 | 0 | 0 |
| 4 | DF | (Bosnia and Herzegovina) BIH | Muharem Trako | 20 | 0 | 14+5 | 0 | 1 | 0 |
| 5/28 | DF | (Bosnia and Herzegovina) BIH | Marin Aničić | 2 | 0 | 2 | 0 | 0 | 0 |
| 6 | DF | (Bosnia and Herzegovina) BIH | Enedin Mulalić | 14 | 1 | 13+1 | 1 | 0 | 0 |
| 17 | DF | (Serbia) SRB | Nemanja Tomašević | 26 | 0 | 21+4 | 0 | 1 | 0 |
| 21 | DF | (Bosnia and Herzegovina) BIH | Besim Šerbečić | 14 | 0 | 13+1 | 0 | 0 | 0 |
| 23 | DF | (Serbia) SRB | Slaviša Radović | 11 | 0 | 7+4 | 0 | 0 | 0 |
| 33 | DF | (Bosnia and Herzegovina) BIH | Nidal Čelik | 0 | 0 | 0 | 0 | 0 | 0 |
| 66 | DF | (Montenegro) MNE | Ilija Martinović | 12 | 2 | 12 | 2 | 0 | 0 |
Midfielders
| 5 | MF | (Croatia) CRO | Ivan Jelić Balta | 13 | 0 | 12+1 | 0 | 0 | 0 |
| 8 | MF | (Bosnia and Herzegovina) BIH | Mario Vrančić | 14 | 1 | 12+2 | 1 | 0 | 0 |
| 10 | MF | (Bosnia and Herzegovina) BIH | Dal Varešanović | 31 | 8 | 25+5 | 8 | 0+1 | 0 |
| 14 | MF | (Bosnia and Herzegovina) BIH | Tarik Ramić | 13 | 0 | 5+8 | 0 | 0 | 0 |
| 15 | MF | (Bosnia and Herzegovina) BIH | Haris Ališah | 2 | 0 | 1+1 | 0 | 0 | 0 |
| 16 | MF | (Bosnia and Herzegovina) BIH | Hamza Ljukovac | 0 | 0 | 0 | 0 | 0 | 0 |
| 19 | MF | (Bosnia and Herzegovina) BIH | Adnan Džafić | 28 | 2 | 14+13 | 2 | 1 | 0 |
| 20 | MF | (Bosnia and Herzegovina) BIH | Đani Salčin | 7 | 0 | 0+7 | 0 | 0 | 0 |
| 25 | MF | (Croatia) CRO | Frane Čirjak | 21 | 0 | 18+3 | 0 | 0 | 0 |
| 27 | MF | (North Macedonia) MKD | Daniel Avramovski | 20 | 2 | 9+10 | 2 | 1 | 0 |
| 31 | MF | (Bosnia and Herzegovina) BIH | Bakir Nurković | 2 | 0 | 0+2 | 0 | 0 | 0 |
| 50 | MF | (Bosnia and Herzegovina) BIH | Muhamed Buljubašić | 1 | 0 | 0+1 | 0 | 0 | 0 |
| 77 | MF | (Bosnia and Herzegovina) BIH | Almedin Ziljkić | 14 | 5 | 13+1 | 5 | 0 | 0 |
| 98 | MF | (Bosnia and Herzegovina) BIH | Mirza Mustafić | 21 | 1 | 7+13 | 1 | 0+1 | 0 |
Forwards
| 7 | FW | (Bosnia and Herzegovina) BIH | Hamza Čataković | 29 | 7 | 17+11 | 6 | 1 | 1 |
| 9 | FW | (Brazil) BRA | Renan Oliveira | 14 | 9 | 9+5 | 9 | 0 | 0 |
| 11 | FW | (Ghana) GHA | Francis Kyeremeh | 10 | 1 | 10 | 1 | 0 | 0 |
| 18 | FW | (Georgia (country)) GEO | Giorgi Guliashvili | 10 | 0 | 5+5 | 0 | 0 | 0 |
| 30 | FW | (Bosnia and Herzegovina) BIH | Irfan Ramić | 6 | 0 | 0+5 | 0 | 1 | 0 |
| 45 | FW | (Bosnia and Herzegovina) BIH | Nermin Bijelonja | 0 | 0 | 0 | 0 | 0 | 0 |
Players transferred out during the season
| 18 | DF | (Bosnia and Herzegovina) BIH | Nihad Mujakić | 2 | 0 | 2 | 0 | 0 | 0 |
| 28 | DF | (North Macedonia) MKD | Vlatko Drobarov | 15 | 0 | 12+2 | 0 | 1 | 0 |
| 8 | MF | (Bosnia and Herzegovina) BIH | Andrej Đokanović | 18 | 0 | 17 | 0 | 1 | 0 |
| 18 | MF | (Ghana) GHA | Abdul Rashid Abubakar | 5 | 0 | 1+4 | 0 | 0 | 0 |
| 88 | MF | (Bosnia and Herzegovina) BIH | Rifet Kapić | 6 | 0 | 3+3 | 0 | 0 | 0 |
| 96 | MF | (Bosnia and Herzegovina) BIH | Rijad Kobiljar | 13 | 1 | 1+11 | 1 | 0+1 | 0 |
| 99 | MF | (Bosnia and Herzegovina) BIH | Asmir Suljić | 15 | 0 | 13+1 | 0 | 1 | 0 |
| 9 | FW | (Bosnia and Herzegovina) BIH | Mersudin Ahmetović | 17 | 2 | 3+13 | 2 | 0+1 | 0 |
| 11 | FW | (Bosnia and Herzegovina) BIH | Nardin Mulahusejnović | 17 | 3 | 9+7 | 3 | 1 | 0 |
| 29 | FW | (Croatia) CRO | Ivan Ikić | 18 | 5 | 11+6 | 5 | 0+1 | 0 |

Number after the "+" sign represents the number of games player started the game on the bench and was substituted on.

=== Goalscorers ===
| Rank | No. | Pos. | Nat. | Player | Bosnian Premier League | Bosnian Cup | Total |
|---|---|---|---|---|---|---|---|
| 1 | 9 | FW | (Brazil) | Renan Oliveira | 9 | 0 | 9 |
| 2 | 10 | MF | (Bosnia and Herzegovina) | Dal Varešanović | 8 | 0 | 8 |
| 3 | 7 | FW | (Bosnia and Herzegovina) | Hamza Čataković | 6 | 1 | 7 |
| 4 | 29 | FW | (Croatia) | Ivan Ikić | 5 | 0 | 5 |
| 4 | 77 | MF | (Bosnia and Herzegovina) | Almedin Ziljkić | 5 | 0 | 5 |
| 5 | 11 | FW | (Bosnia and Herzegovina) | Nardin Mulahusejnović | 3 | 0 | 3 |
| 6 | 9 | FW | (Bosnia and Herzegovina) | Mersudin Ahmetović | 2 | 0 | 2 |
| 6 | 19 | MF | (Bosnia and Herzegovina) | Adnan Džafić | 2 | 0 | 2 |
| 6 | 27 | MF | (North Macedonia) | Daniel Avramovski | 2 | 0 | 2 |
| 6 | 66 | DF | (Montenegro) | Ilija Martinović | 2 | 0 | 2 |
| 7 | 2 | DF | (Nigeria) | Musa Muhammed | 1 | 0 | 1 |
| 7 | 6 | DF | (Bosnia and Herzegovina) | Enedin Mulalić | 1 | 0 | 1 |
| 7 | 8 | MF | (Bosnia and Herzegovina) | Mario Vrančić | 1 | 0 | 1 |
| 7 | 11 | FW | (Ghana) | Francis Kyeremeh | 1 | 0 | 1 |
| 7 | 96 | MF | (Bosnia and Herzegovina) | Rijad Kobiljar | 1 | 0 | 1 |
| 7 | 98 | MF | (Bosnia and Herzegovina) | Mirza Mustafić | 1 | 0 | 1 |
| Total | | | | | 50 | 1 | 51 |

=== Hat-tricks ===
| Player | Against | Result | Date | Competition | Ref |
|---|---|---|---|---|---|
| (Brazil) Renan Oliveira | (Bosnia and Herzegovina) Velež | 3–5 (A) | 21 May 2023 | Bosnian Premier League | |

(H) – Home; (A) – Away

=== Assists ===
| Rank | No. | Pos. | Nat. | Player | Bosnian Premier League | Bosnian Cup | Total |
|---|---|---|---|---|---|---|---|
| 1 | 77 | MF | (Bosnia and Herzegovina) | Almedin Ziljkić | 4 | 0 | 4 |
| 2 | 10 | MF | (Bosnia and Herzegovina) | Dal Varešanović | 3 | 0 | 3 |
| 2 | 11 | FW | (Ghana) | Francis Kyeremeh | 3 | 0 | 3 |
| 3 | 2 | DF | (Nigeria) | Musa Muhammed | 2 | 0 | 2 |
| 3 | 8 | MF | (Bosnia and Herzegovina) | Mario Vrančić | 2 | 0 | 2 |
| 3 | 9 | FW | (Brazil) | Renan Oliveira | 2 | 0 | 2 |
| 3 | 19 | MF | (Bosnia and Herzegovina) | Adnan Džafić | 2 | 0 | 2 |
| 3 | 29 | FW | (Croatia) | Ivan Ikić | 2 | 0 | 2 |
| 3 | 99 | MF | (Bosnia and Herzegovina) | Asmir Suljić | 2 | 0 | 2 |
| 4 | 6 | DF | (Bosnia and Herzegovina) | Enedin Mulalić | 1 | 0 | 1 |
| 4 | 7 | FW | (Bosnia and Herzegovina) | Hamza Čataković | 1 | 0 | 1 |
| 4 | 9 | FW | (Bosnia and Herzegovina) | Mersudin Ahmetović | 1 | 0 | 1 |
| 4 | 11 | FW | (Bosnia and Herzegovina) | Nardin Mulahusejnović | 1 | 0 | 1 |
| 4 | 23 | DF | (Serbia) | Slaviša Radović | 1 | 0 | 1 |
| 4 | 27 | MF | (North Macedonia) | Daniel Avramovski | 1 | 0 | 1 |
| 4 | 98 | MF | (Bosnia and Herzegovina) | Mirza Mustafić | 1 | 0 | 1 |
| Total | | | | | 29 | 0 | 29 |

=== Clean sheets ===
| Rank | No. | Nat. | Player | Bosnian Premier League | Bosnian Cup | Total |
|---|---|---|---|---|---|---|
| 1 | 1 | (Bosnia and Herzegovina) | Muhamed Šahinović | 5 | 0 | 5 |
| 2 | 35 | (Bosnia and Herzegovina) | Belmin Dizdarević | 3 | 0 | 3 |
| Total | | | | 8 | 0 | 8 |

=== Disciplinary record ===
| N | P | Nat. | Name | Bosnian Premier League | | | Bosnian Cup | | | Total | | | Notes |
| N | P | Nat. | Name | Yellow card | Second yellow card | Red card | Yellow card | Second yellow card | Red card | Yellow card | Second yellow card | Red card | Notes |
| 1 | GK | (Bosnia and Herzegovina) | Muhamed Šahinović | 1 | | | | | | 1 | | | |
| 2 | DF | (Nigeria) | Musa Muhammed | 3 | | | | | | 3 | | | |
| 3 | DF | (Bosnia and Herzegovina) | Avdija Vršajević | 2 | | | | | | 2 | | | |
| 4 | DF | (Bosnia and Herzegovina) | Muharem Trako | 3 | 1 | | | | | 3 | 1 | | |
| 5 | DF | (Croatia) | Ivan Jelić Balta | 6 | | | | | | 6 | | | |
| 6 | DF | (Bosnia and Herzegovina) | Enedin Mulalić | 4 | | | | | | 4 | | | |
| 7 | FW | (Bosnia and Herzegovina) | Hamza Čataković | 2 | | | | | | 2 | | | |
| 8 | MF | (Bosnia and Herzegovina) | Andrej Đokanović | 3 | | | | | | 3 | | | |
| 8 | MF | (Bosnia and Herzegovina) | Mario Vrančić | 3 | | | | | | 3 | | | |
| 9 | FW | (Brazil) | Renan Oliveira | 2 | | | | | | 2 | | | |
| 10 | MF | (Bosnia and Herzegovina) | Dal Varešanović | 7 | | | | | | 7 | | | |
| 11 | FW | (Ghana) | Francis Kyeremeh | 2 | | | | | | 2 | | | |
| 11 | FW | (Bosnia and Herzegovina) | Nardin Mulahusejnović | 4 | | | | | | 4 | | | |
| 14 | MF | (Bosnia and Herzegovina) | Tarik Ramić | 2 | | 1 | | | | 2 | | 1 | |
| 17 | DF | (Serbia) | Nemanja Tomašević | 3 | | | | | | 3 | | | |
| 18 | DF | (Bosnia and Herzegovina) | Nihad Mujakić | 1 | | | | | | 1 | | | |
| 18 | MF | (Ghana) | Abdul Rashid Abubakar | 2 | | | | | | 2 | | | |
| 18 | FW | (Georgia (country)) | Giorgi Guliashvili | 1 | | | | | | 1 | | | |
| 19 | MF | (Bosnia and Herzegovina) | Adnan Džafić | 6 | | | | | | 6 | | | |
| 21 | DF | (Bosnia and Herzegovina) | Besim Šerbečić | 3 | | | | | | 3 | | | |
| 23 | DF | (Serbia) | Slaviša Radović | 3 | | | | | | 3 | | | |
| 25 | MF | (Croatia) | Frane Čirjak | 4 | 1 | | | | | 4 | 1 | | |
| 27 | MF | (North Macedonia) | Daniel Avramovski | 3 | | | | | | 3 | | | |
| 28 | DF | (North Macedonia) | Vlatko Drobarov | 3 | | | | | | 3 | | | |
| 29 | FW | (Croatia) | Ivan Ikić | 3 | | | | | | 3 | | | |
| 35 | GK | (Bosnia and Herzegovina) | Belmin Dizdarević | 1 | | | | | | 1 | | | |
| 66 | DF | (Montenegro) | Ilija Martinović | 2 | | | | | | 2 | | | |
| 77 | MF | (Bosnia and Herzegovina) | Almedin Ziljkić | 3 | 1 | | | | | 3 | 1 | | |
| 96 | MF | (Bosnia and Herzegovina) | Rijad Kobiljar | 3 | | | | | | 3 | | | |
| 98 | MF | (Bosnia and Herzegovina) | Mirza Mustafić | 4 | | | | | | 4 | | | |
| 99 | MF | (Bosnia and Herzegovina) | Asmir Suljić | 4 | | | 1 | | | 5 | | | |
| | | (Bosnia and Herzegovina) | Feđa Dudić | 3 | | | | | | 3 | | | Manager |
| | | (Bosnia and Herzegovina) | Mirza Varešanović | | 1 | | | | | | 1 | | Manager |
| | | (Bosnia and Herzegovina) | Mustafa Kodro | | | 1 | | | | | | 1 | Assistant manager |
| | | (Bosnia and Herzegovina) | Emir Obuća | 2 | | | | | | 2 | | | Assistant manager |
| | | (Bosnia and Herzegovina) | Senad Repuh | 1 | | | | | | 1 | | | Assistant manager |
| | | (Bosnia and Herzegovina) | Mustafa Beridan | | | 1 | | | | | | 1 | Equipment manager |
| | | (Bosnia and Herzegovina) | Emir Hadžić | 2 | | | | | | 2 | | | Sporting director |

Source: Competitive matches
Only competitive matches
(yellow card) = Number of bookings; (second yellow card) = Number of sending offs after a second yellow card; (red card) = Number of sending offs by a direct red card.

=== Games as captain ===
| Rank | No. | Pos. | Nat. | Player | Bosnian Premier League | Bosnian Cup | Total |
|---|---|---|---|---|---|---|---|
| 1 | 99 | MF | (Bosnia and Herzegovina) | Asmir Suljić | 13 | 1 | 14 |
| 2 | 21 | DF | (Bosnia and Herzegovina) | Besim Šerbečić | 6 | 0 | 6 |
| 2 | 77 | MF | (Bosnia and Herzegovina) | Almedin Ziljkić | 6 | 0 | 6 |
| 4 | 8 | MF | (Bosnia and Herzegovina) | Andrej Đokanović | 5 | 0 | 5 |
| 5 | 3 | DF | (Bosnia and Herzegovina) | Avdija Vršajević | 2 | 0 | 2 |
| 6 | 10 | MF | (Bosnia and Herzegovina) | Dal Varešanović | 1 | 0 | 1 |
| Total | | | | | 33 | 1 | 34 |
