= 2015–16 Premier League of Bosnia and Herzegovina =

Premijer liga
- Season: 2015–16
- Champions: Zrinjski; 4th Premier League title 4th Bosnian title
- Relegated: Borac; Slavija; Travnik; Rudar (P); Drina; Velež
- Champions League: Zrinjski
- Europa League: Sloboda; Široki Brijeg; Radnik
- Matches: 240
- Goals: 551 (2.3 per match)
- Top goalscorer: Leon Benko (18 goals)
- Biggest home win: Travnik 7-1 Velež (23 April 2016)
- Biggest away win: 0-3 on several occasions
- Highest scoring: Travnik 7-1 Velež (23 April 2016)
- Longest winning run: Željezničar (9)
- Longest unbeaten run: Željezničar (13)
- Longest winless run: Velež (18)
- Longest losing run: Velež (13)

The 2015–16 Premier League of Bosnia and Herzegovina (known as BH Telecom Premier League for sponsorship reasons) was the sixteenth season of the Premier League of Bosnia and Herzegovina, the highest football league of Bosnia and Herzegovina, since its original establishment in 2000 and fourteenth as a unified country-wide league. The league began on 25 July 2015 and ended on 14 May 2016, with a winter break between 7 December 2015 and 27 February 2016. The official fixture schedule was released on 10 July 2015. In the 2015–16 season, six teams will be relegated as the league decided to reduce the number of participants from the current 16 to 12 for the 2016–17 season.

The 2015–16 season saw the return of Rudar Prijedor and newcomer Mladost Doboj Kakanj to the top flight as promoted teams, in place of Mladost Velika Obarska who returned to the First League of RS after two seasons in the top flight and Zvijezda Gradačac who were relegated to the First League of FBiH after spending 7 seasons in the Premier League of Bosnia and Herzegovina. Sarajevo were the defending champions.

== Teams ==
A total of 16 teams contested in the league, including the top 14 sides from the 2014–15 season and two promoted sides from each of the second-level leagues.

=== Stadiums and locations ===
Location of the 2015–16 Premier League of Bosnia and Herzegovina clubs

Team	Location	Stadium	Capacity
FK Borac Banja Luka	Banja Luka	Gradski Stadion, Banja Luka	9,730
NK Čelik Zenica	Zenica	Bilino Polje	15,292
FK Drina Zvornik	Zvornik	Gradski Stadion, Zvornik	5,000
FK Mladost Doboj Kakanj	Doboj (Kakanj)	Stadion Mladost Kakanj, Doboj (Kakanj)	1,000
FK Olimpic Sarajevo	Sarajevo	Otoka	3,000
FK Radnik Bijeljina	Bijeljina	Gradski Stadion, Bijeljina	6,000
FK Rudar Prijedor	Prijedor	Gradski Stadion, Prijedor	6,000
FK Sarajevo	Sarajevo	Asim Ferhatović Hase	35,630
FK Slavija Istočno Sarajevo	Istočno Sarajevo	SRC Slavija	6,000
FK Sloboda Tuzla	Tuzla	Tušanj	8,550
NK Široki Brijeg	Široki Brijeg	Pecara	5,628
NK Travnik	Travnik	Pirota	3,200
FK Velež Mostar	Mostar	Vrapčići	5,294
NK Vitez	Vitez	Gradski Stadion, NK Vitez	3,000
HŠK Zrinjski Mostar	Mostar	Bijeli Brijeg	20,000
FK Željezničar Sarajevo	Sarajevo	Grbavica	16,100

=== Personnel and kits ===
Note: Flags indicate national team as has been defined under FIFA eligibility rules. Players and Managers may hold more than one non-FIFA nationality.

Personnel and kits
Team	Head coach	Captain	Kit manufacturer	shirt sponsor
FK Borac Banja Luka	(Bosnia and Herzegovina) Borče Sredojević	(Bosnia and Herzegovina) Boris Raspudić	NAAI	m:tel
NK Čelik Zenica	(Bosnia and Herzegovina) Elvedin Beganović	(Bosnia and Herzegovina) Adi Adilović	Joma	RM-LH
FK Drina Zvornik	(Bosnia and Herzegovina) Cvijetin Blagojević	(Serbia) Aleksandar Kikić	Bull	Vitinka
FK Mladost Doboj Kakanj	(Bosnia and Herzegovina) Ibro Rahimić	(Bosnia and Herzegovina) Haris Dilaver	Joma	Kakanj Cement
FK Olimpic Sarajevo	(Bosnia and Herzegovina) Milomir Odović	(Bosnia and Herzegovina) Veldin Muharemović	Puma	Europlakat
FK Radnik Bijeljina	(Serbia) Slavko Petrović	(Serbia) Stanko Ostojić	Bull	—
FK Rudar Prijedor	(Bosnia and Herzegovina) Zlatko Jelisavac	(Bosnia and Herzegovina) Nebojša Šodić	GBT	ArcelorMittal
FK Sarajevo	(Bosnia and Herzegovina) Almir Hurtić	(Bosnia and Herzegovina) Haris Duljević	Haad	Turkish Airlines
FK Slavija Istočno Sarajevo	(North Macedonia) Milko Gjurovski	(Bosnia and Herzegovina) Mladen Lučić	Joma	Nova Banka
FK Sloboda Tuzla	(Bosnia and Herzegovina) Husref Musemić	(Bosnia and Herzegovina) Zajko Zeba	Patrick	Tuzlanski pilsner
NK Široki Brijeg	(Bosnia and Herzegovina) Slaven Musa	(Brazil) Wagner	Jako	Mepas
NK Travnik	(Bosnia and Herzegovina) Boris Gavran	(Bosnia and Herzegovina) Anel Ćurić	NAAI	ADK
FK Velež Mostar	(Bosnia and Herzegovina) Zijo Tojaga	(Bosnia and Herzegovina) Adnan Bobić	Givova	HEPOK Mostar
NK Vitez	(Croatia) Branko Karačić	(Croatia) Goran Jurić	Joma	—
HŠK Zrinjski Mostar	(Bosnia and Herzegovina) Vinko Marinović	(Bosnia and Herzegovina) Pero Stojkić	Zeus	Interagent/Energia naturalis
FK Željezničar Sarajevo	(Bosnia and Herzegovina) Edis Mulalić	(Bosnia and Herzegovina) Aleksandar Kosorić	Joma	—

== League table ==
Pos	Team	Pld	W	D	L	GF	GA	GD	Pts	Qualification or relegation
1	Zrinjski Mostar (C)	30	21	6	3	52	17	+35	69	Qualification for the Champions League second qualifying round
2	Sloboda Tuzla	30	19	5	6	44	23	+21	62	Qualification for the Europa League first qualifying round
3	Široki Brijeg	30	18	7	5	56	21	+35	61	Qualification for the Europa League first qualifying round
4	Sarajevo	30	18	3	9	56	28	+28	57	
5	Željezničar	30	16	7	7	36	20	+16	55	
6	Čelik Zenica	30	12	10	8	35	28	+7	46	
7	Radnik Bijeljina	30	13	6	11	25	25	0	45	Qualification for the Europa League first qualifying round (Note: Radnik Bijeljina qualified for the Europa League first qualifying round by winning the 2015–16 Bosnia and Herzegovina Football Cup.)
8	Olimpic	30	11	6	13	36	33	+3	39	
9	Vitez	30	11	6	13	36	41	−5	39	
10	Mladost Doboj Kakanj	30	10	9	11	29	39	−10	39	
11	Borac Banja Luka (R)	30	10	6	14	27	33	−6	36	Relegation to the Prva Liga RS
12	Slavija (R)	30	8	11	11	25	37	−12	35	Relegation to the Prva Liga RS
13	Travnik (R)	30	8	5	17	36	47	−11	29	Relegation to the Prva Liga FBiH
14	Rudar Prijedor (R)	30	5	10	15	24	38	−14	25	Relegation to the Prva Liga RS
15	Drina Zvornik (R)	30	7	1	22	24	66	−42	22	Relegation to the Prva Liga RS
16	Velež Mostar (R)	30	1	6	23	10	55	−45	9	Relegation to the Prva Liga FBiH

Source: UEFA, Soccerway
Rules for classification: 1) Points; 2) Goal difference; 3) Goals scored; 4) Head-to-head points; 5) Head-to-head goal difference; 6) Head-to-head away goals (only if two teams); 7) Head-to-head goals scored; 8) Goal difference; 9) Play-off. (Criteria 2 and 3 are not used to decide champion, UEFA competition qualification, or relegation)
(C) Champions; (R) Relegated

=== Positions by round ===
Team ╲ Round	1	2	3	4	5	6	7	8	9	10	11	12	13	14	15	16	17	18	19	20	21	22	23	24	25	26	27	28	29	30
Sloboda Tuzla	11	8	6	5	2	2	2	2	2	3	1																			
Zrinjski	3	2	1	1	1	1	1	1	1	1	2																			
Sarajevo	1	6	4	6	7	4	7	5	4	2	3																			
Široki Brijeg	4	1	5	4	3	3	6	4	3	4	4																			
Radnik	5	3	3	2	6	7	3	3	5	6	5																			
Željezničar	11	14	10	10	9	10	11	8	7	8	6																			
Slavija	9	11	12	9	5	6	3	7	6	7	7																			
Čelik	5	4	2	3	4	5	3	6	8	5	8																			
Vitez	11	15	15	15	14	15	16	14	11	13	9																			
Olimpic	14	12	13	16	12	13	9	9	9	9	10																			
Mladost Doboj Kakanj	15	13	14	13	13	9	10	12	12	12	11																			
Travnik	10	8	10	8	11	10	12	13	14	11	12																			
Rudar Prijedor	2	7	8	10	8	8	13	11	13	14	13																			
Borac Banja Luka	5	4	7	7	10	12	8	10	10	10	14																			
Velež	8	10	9	12	15	16	15	16	16	15	15																			
Drina Zvornik	16	16	16	14	16	14	14	15	15	16	16																			

Leader
2015–16 UEFA Europa League First qualifying round
Relegation to 2016–17 Prva Liga FBiH or 2016–17 Prva Liga RS

Updated to match(es) played on 4 October 2015. Source: SportSport.ba

== Results ==
Home \ Away	BOR	ČEL	DRZ	MDK	OLI	RAD	RPR	SAR	SLA	SLO	ŠB	TRA	VEL	VIT	ZRI	ŽEL
Borac Banja Luka		1–1	3–0	1–1	0–1	0–1	1–2	0–1	2–1	0–0	0–2	2–1	2–1	2–2	2–1	1–0
Čelik	0–0		2–1	1–0	1–0	2–0	0–0	1–1	2–0	1–0	2–1	1–1	1–0	6–1	2–2	1–0
Drina Zvornik	1–0	0–2		0–2	0–3	1–0	4–1	1–3	1–1	1–2	0–3	1–0	1–2	0–2	0–1	0–2
Mladost Doboj Kakanj	1–2	1–0	4–2		2–0	0–0	2–1	2–1	1–1	1–1	1–2	2–1	1–0	0–0	0–3	2–1
Olimpic	3–0	1–1	4–0	0–0		0–0	6–2	1–3	2–3	0–1	2–1	1–0	1–0	0–0	0–3	0–1
Radnik	0–2	2–1	1–0	3–0	0–0		2–0	0–3	2–1	0–1	0–1	2–0	0–0	1–0	0–1	0–0
Rudar Prijedor	0–1	0–0	0–1	3–0	0–0	0–1		1–1	2–2	0–1	0–1	2–1	4–0	1–1	0–1	1–0
Sarajevo	2–0	2–1	6–1	2–1	1–3	2–1	2–0		3–0	1–0	2–1	4–0	4–1	4–0	0–1	0–1
Slavija	3–0	2–1	1–0	1–1	1–0	2–1	0–0	1–0		0–1	0–0	0–0	1–1	0–1	0–1	1–1
Sloboda Tuzla	1–1	4–2	0–2	2–0	2–1	1–0	2–1	4–0	4–0		0–3	2–0	2–0	2–1	2–1	0–1
Široki Brijeg	1–0	0–0	5–1	3–0	2–0	5–0	2–0	1–0	4–0	0–0		2–2	1–0	5–1	3–4	1–1
Travnik	0–2	3–2	4–2	1–2	2–1	1–3	0–0	1–0	0–0	2–3	1–2		7–1	3–1	1–4	2–0
Velež	1–1	0–0	0–1	0–0	1–2	0–2	0–0	0–3	0–3	1–2	0–3	0–1		0–1	0–1	0–1
Vitez	1–0	1–0	3–0	1–1	1–2	0–1	3–1	1–3	2–0	1–3	1–1	2–0	6–0		1–0	0–1
Zrinjski	1–0	0–0	5–0	4–0	2–0	0–0	2–1	2–2	4–0	2–1	0–0	1–0	1–0	1–0		2–1
Željezničar	1–0	4–0	3–2	2–1	3–1	1–2	1–1	1–0	0–0	0–0	2–0	2–1	2–1	3–0	0–0	

Source: SportSport.ba
Legend: Blue = home team win; Yellow = draw; Red = away team win.

=== Clubs season-progress ===
Team ╲ Round	1	2	3	4	5	6	7	8	9	10	11	12	13	14	15	16	17	18	19	20	21	22	23	24	25	26	27	28	29	30
Borac Banja Luka	W	D	D	D	L	L	W	L	W	D	L																			
Čelik	W	D	W	L	D	D	W	D	L	D	L	W																		
Drina Zvornik	L	L	L	W	L	W	L	L	L	L	L	L																		
Mladost Doboj Kakanj	L	D	D	D	D	W	D	L	D	D	W	W																		
Olimpic	L	D	D	L	W	D	W	L	W	D	L																			
Radnik	W	W	D	D	L	D	W	W	L	D	W	W																		
Rudar Prijedor	W	L	D	L	W	L	L	D	L	D	W	L																		
Sarajevo	W	L	W	L	D	W	L	W	W	W	L	W	L	W	W	W	W	L	D	W	D	W	W	W	W	L	W	W	L	
Slavija	D	D	L	W	W	D	W	L	W	D	D																			
Sloboda Tuzla	L	W	W	D	W	W	D	W	D	D	W	W																		
Široki Brijeg	W	W	L	D	D	W	L	W	W	D	D																			
Travnik	L	W	L	W	L	D	L	L	L	W	W	L																		
Velež	D	D	D	L	L	L	D	L	L	W	L	L	L	L	D	L	L	L	L	L	L	L	L	L	L	L	L	L	D	
Vitez	L	L	L	W	D	L	L	W	W	L	W	L																		
Zrinjski	W	W	W	W	D	D	W	W	L	D	L	W																		
Željezničar	L	L	W	D	W	L	D	W	W	L	W	L	W	L	D	W	D	W	W	W	W	W	W	W	W	W	D	L	D	

Updated to match(es) played on 17 October 2015. Source: SportSport.ba
W = Win; D = Draw; L = Lose

== Top goalscorers ==
Rank	Player	Club	Goals
1	(Croatia) Leon Benko	Sarajevo	18
2	(Brazil) Wagner	Široki Brijeg	12
3	(Bosnia and Herzegovina) Haris Dilaver	Mladost Doboj Kakanj	11
3	(Croatia) Ivan Krstanović	Široki Brijeg	11
3	(Bosnia and Herzegovina) Jasmin Mešanović	Zrinjski	11
6	(Bosnia and Herzegovina) Mersudin Ahmetović	Sloboda	10
6	(Bosnia and Herzegovina) Zajko Zeba	Sloboda	10
8	(Bosnia and Herzegovina) Amer Bekić	Sarajevo	9
8	(Bosnia and Herzegovina) Mahir Karić	Čelik	9
8	(Ivory Coast) Germain Kouadio	Travnik	9
8	(Montenegro) Marko Obradović	Radnik	9
8	(Serbia) Darko Spalević	Slavija	9

== Attendances ==
#	Club	Average
1	Željezničar	4,500
2	Sarajevo	3,800
3	Sloboda	3,073
4	Zrinjski	2,547
5	Borac	2,237
6	Široki	1,387
7	Vitez	1,130
8	Velež	983
9	Čelik	937
10	Mladost	933
11	Travnik	690
12	Slavija	670
13	Radnik	664
14	Rudar	637
15	Olimpik	523
16	Drina	523
