= 2014–15 First League of the Federation of Bosnia and Herzegovina =

First League of the Federation of Bosnia and Herzegovina
- Season: 2014–15
- Champions: Mladost Doboj Kakanj
- Promoted: Mladost Doboj Kakanj
- Relegated: Gradina; Turbina; Igman
- Matches: 240
- Goals: 520 (2.17 per match)
- Top goalscorer: Željko Malčić (23 goals)

The 2014–15 First League of the Federation of Bosnia and Herzegovina was the fifteenth season of the First League of the Federation of Bosnia and Herzegovina, the second tier football league of Bosnia and Herzegovina. It began on 9 August 2014 and ended on 7 June 2015. Sloboda Tuzla were the last champions, having won their first championship title in the 2013–14 season and earning a promotion to Premier League of Bosnia and Herzegovina.

== Teams ==
Location of clubs in 2014–15 First League of the FBiH

Team	Location	Stadium	Capacity
Branitelj	Rodoč, Mostar	SC Rodoč	500
Bratstvo	Gračanica	Gradski Stadion Luke, Gračanica	3,000
Budućnost	Banovići	Gradski Stadion, Banovići	4,600
Čapljina	Čapljina	Bjelave Stadium	3,000
GOŠK	Gabela	Podavala Stadium	3,000
Goražde	Goražde	Midhat Drljević Stadium	1,500
Gradina	Srebrenik	Gradski Stadion, Srebrenik	3,000
Igman	Konjic	Gradski Stadion, Konjic	5,000
Jedinstvo	Bihać	Pod Borićima Stadium	7,500
Metalleghe-BSI	Jajce	Mračaj Stadium	3,700
Mladost	Doboj, Kakanj	Mladost Kakanj Stadium	4,568
Orašje	Orašje	Gradski Stadion, Orašje	4,500
Podgrmeč	Sanski Most	Gradski Stadion, Sanski Most	1,500
Radnički	Lukavac	Jošik Stadium	2,000
Rudar	Kakanj	FK Rudar Stadium	4,568
Turbina	Jablanica	Gradski Stadion, Jablanica	2,000

== League table ==
Pos	Team	Pld	W	D	L	GF	GA	GD	Pts	Promotion or relegation
1	Mladost Doboj Kakanj (C, P)	30	19	2	9	39	25	+14	59	Promotion to Premijer liga BiH
2	GOŠK Gabela	30	16	9	5	48	18	+30	57	
3	Bratstvo Gračanica	30	16	5	9	42	28	+14	53	
4	Budućnost	30	16	5	9	37	27	+10	53	
5	Goražde	30	14	8	8	33	19	+14	50	
6	Metalleghe-BSI	30	15	5	10	34	26	+8	50	
7	Radnički Lukavac	30	12	11	7	38	26	+12	47	
8	Rudar Kakanj	30	12	7	11	35	33	+2	43	
9	Jedinstvo	30	11	9	10	30	23	+7	42	
10	Branitelj	30	8	11	11	20	25	−5	35	
11	Orašje	30	9	8	13	33	42	−9	35	
12	Čapljina	30	10	4	16	38	44	−6	34	
13	Podgrmeč	30	9	7	14	27	41	−14	34	
14	Gradina Srebrenik (R)	30	9	6	15	29	39	−10	33	Relegation to Second League FBiH
15	Turbina Jablanica (R)	30	7	6	17	17	48	−31	27	Relegation to Second League FBiH
16	Igman (R)	30	2	7	21	20	56	−36	13	Relegation to Second League FBiH

Source: Soccerway
Rules for classification: 1st points; 2nd goal difference; 3rd goals scored For deciding champions, qualification to higher rank and relegation: 1st points; 2nd head-to-head points; 3rd head-to-head goal difference; 4th head-to-head goals scored; 5th head-to-head away goals scored; 6th goal difference; 7th goals scored
(C) Champions; (P) Promoted; (R) Relegated

== Statistics ==
=== Top goalscorers ===
Rank	Player	Club	Goals
1	(Bosnia and Herzegovina) Željko Malčić	GOŠK Gabela	23
2	(Croatia) Zdenko Jurčević	Čapljina	16
3	(Bosnia and Herzegovina) Senad Mujić	Orašje	15
4	(Bosnia and Herzegovina) Rijad Pljevljak	Bratstvo	10
5	(Bosnia and Herzegovina) Haris Dilaver	Mladost (DK)	9
5	(Bosnia and Herzegovina) Mirza Kovač	Metalleghe-BSI	9
5	(Bosnia and Herzegovina) Anel Husić	Budućnost	9
