= Aladin Isaković =

Bosnian footballer (born 1985)

Personal information
- Date of birth: 28 July 1985 (age 41)
- Place of birth: Zenica, SFR Yugoslavia
- Height: 1.93 m (6 ft 4 in)
- Position: Centre-back

Team information
- Current team: Čelik Zenica
- Number: 9

Senior career*
Years	Team	Apps	(Gls)
2006–2009	Žepče	31	(0)
2009–2012	Čelik Zenica	61	(4)
2012–2013	Heimstetten	1	(0)
2013–2014	Travnik	24	(7)
2014	Vitez	9	(3)
2014	Frauenfeld	12	(0)
2014–2020	Mladost Doboj Kakanj	135	(10)
2020–2021	Vis Simm-Bau	13	(1)
2021–	Čelik Zenica	81	(21)
- * Club domestic league appearances and goals as of 14 November 2020

Aladin Isaković (born 28 July 1985) is a Bosnian professional footballer who plays as a centre-back for First League of FBiH club Čelik Zenica.

== Career ==
=== Early career ===
Isaković started off his career at Žepče, where he played until 2009. After Žepče, he played for hometown club Čelik Zenica, Heimstetten, Travnik, Vitez and Frauenfeld.

=== Mladost Doboj Kakanj ===
On 24 December 2014, Isaković signed a contract with, at that time, First League of FBiH club Mladost Doboj Kakanj. In June 2015 with Mladost, he won the 2014–15 First League of FBiH and got promoted to the Bosnian Premier League. In 2017, Isaković became the captain of Mladost. On 30 June 2018, he extended his contract with the club until June 2020.

On 15 August 2018, in a 0–1 loss against Široki Brijeg, Isaković made his 100th appearance for Mladost, a club record. On 22 May 2019, he was named the Mladost Doboj Kakanj player of the 2018–19 season by the club supporters.

On 18 June 2020, Isaković left Mladost over five years after joining the club, with his contract expiring.

=== VIS Simm-Bau ===
On 3 July 2020, Isaković signed a contract with newly promoted First League of FBiH club Vis Simm-Bau. He made his official debut for Vis Simm-Bau on 8 August 2020 in a league win against Budućnost Banovići. Isaković scored his first goal for the club in a league match against Slaven Živinice on 22 August 2020.

== Career statistics ==
As of match played 14 November 2020

Appearances and goals by club, season and competition
Club	Season	League	League		Cup		Continental		Total	
Club	Season	League	Apps	Goals	Apps	Goals	Apps	Goals	Apps	Goals
Žepče	2006–07	Bosnian Premier League	7	0	0	0	—		7	0
Žepče	2007–08	Bosnian Premier League	21	0	1	0	—		22	0
Žepče	2008–09	First League of FBiH	3	0	—		—		3	0
Žepče	Total		31	0	1	0	0	0	32	0
Čelik Zenica	2009–10	Bosnian Premier League	25	1	0	0	—		25	1
Čelik Zenica	2010–11	Bosnian Premier League	17	1	3	0	—		20	1
Čelik Zenica	2011–12	Bosnian Premier League	19	2	0	0	—		19	2
Čelik Zenica	Total		61	4	3	0	0	0	64	4
Travnik	2012–13	Bosnian Premier League	8	2	0	0	—		8	2
Travnik	2013–14	Bosnian Premier League	16	5	0	0	—		16	5
Travnik	Total		24	7	0	0	0	0	24	7
Vitez	2013–14	Bosnian Premier League	9	3	0	0	—		9	3
Frauenfeld	2014–15	2. Liga Interregional	12	0	—		—		12	0
Mladost Doboj Kakanj	2014–15	First League of FBiH	11	3	—		—		11	3
Mladost Doboj Kakanj	2015–16	Bosnian Premier League	25	1	1	0	—		26	1
Mladost Doboj Kakanj	2016–17	Bosnian Premier League	27	2	5	0	—		32	2
Mladost Doboj Kakanj	2017–18	Bosnian Premier League	24	2	2	0	—		26	2
Mladost Doboj Kakanj	2018–19	Bosnian Premier League	30	2	0	0	—		30	2
Mladost Doboj Kakanj	2019–20	Bosnian Premier League	18	0	0	0	—		18	0
Mladost Doboj Kakanj	Total		135	10	8	0	—		143	10
Vis Simm-Bau	2020–21	First League of FBiH	13	1	0	0	—		13	1
Career total			285	25	12	0	0	0	297	25

== Honours ==
Mladost Doboj Kakanj

- First League of FBiH: 2014–15

Individual

- Mladost Doboj Kakanj Player of the Season by supporters: 2018–19
