= 2019–20 Premier League of Bosnia and Herzegovina =

Premijer liga
- Season: 2019–20
- Dates: 20 July 2019 – 1 June 2020
- Champions: Sarajevo; 4th Premier League title 5th Bosnian title 7th Domestic title
- Relegated: Čelik (to League of Zenica-Doboj Canton); Zvijezda 09
- Champions League: Sarajevo
- Europa League: Željezničar; Zrinjski; Borac
- Matches: 132
- Goals: 328 (2.48 per match)
- Top goalscorer: Mersudin Ahmetović (13 goals)
- Biggest home win: Željezničar 6–0 Zvijezda 09 (25 September 2019)
- Biggest away win: Zvijezda 09 1–5 Tuzla City (20 July 2019)
- Highest scoring: Sarajevo 6–2 Tuzla City (22 February 2020)
- Longest winning run: 5 matches Borac
- Longest unbeaten run: 11 matches Željezničar
- Longest winless run: 14 matches Zvijezda 09
- Longest losing run: 7 matches Zvijezda 09
- Highest attendance: 15,000; Sarajevo 1–3 Željezničar (30 November 2019)
- Lowest attendance: 150; Zvijezda 09 0–0 Široki Brijeg (31 August 2019)
- Total attendance: 354,986
- Average attendance: 2,689

The 2019–20 Premier League of Bosnia and Herzegovina (known as BH Telecom Premier League for sponsorship reasons) was the twentieth season of the Premier League of Bosnia and Herzegovina, the highest football league of Bosnia and Herzegovina. The season began on 20 July 2019 and ended abruptly on 1 June 2020 due to the COVID-19 pandemic in Bosnia and Herzegovina, with a winter break between early December 2019 and late February 2020.

== Teams ==
A total of 12 teams contested the league, including 10 sides from the 2018–19 season and two promoted from each of the second-level leagues, Borac Banja Luka and Velež Mostar, replacing relegated sides Krupa and GOŠK Gabela.

=== Stadiums and locations ===
Borac	Čelik	Mladost	Radnik
Banja Luka City Stadium	Bilino Polje	MGM Farm Arena	Gradski Stadion Bijeljina
Capacity: 10,030	Capacity: 13,812	Capacity: 3,000	Capacity: 6,000
Sarajevo	Locations of the 2019–20 Premier League of BiH clubs		Sloboda
Asim Ferhatović Hase	Locations of the 2019–20 Premier League of BiH clubs		Tušanj
Capacity: 30,121	Locations of the 2019–20 Premier League of BiH clubs		Capacity: 7,200
Široki Brijeg	Locations of the 2019–20 Premier League of BiH clubs		Tuzla City
Pecara	Locations of the 2019–20 Premier League of BiH clubs		Tušanj
Capacity: 5,147	Locations of the 2019–20 Premier League of BiH clubs		Capacity: 7,200
Velež	Zrinjski	Zvijezda 09	Željezničar
Stadion Rođeni	Stadion pod Bijelim Brijegom	Ugljevik City Stadium	Grbavica
Capacity: 7,000	Capacity: 9,000	Capacity: 5,000	Capacity: 13,146

=== Personnel and kits ===
Note: Flags indicate national team as has been defined under FIFA eligibility rules. Players and Managers may hold more than one non-FIFA nationality.

Team	Head coach	Captain	Kit manufacturer	Shirt sponsor
Borac	(Bosnia and Herzegovina) Vlado Jagodić	(Bosnia and Herzegovina) Stojan Vranješ	Kelme	Prointer
Čelik	(Turkey) Ümit Özat	(Bosnia and Herzegovina) Fenan Salčinović	Nike	WWin
Mladost Doboj Kakanj	(Bosnia and Herzegovina) Fahrudin Šolbić	(Bosnia and Herzegovina) Aladin Isaković	Joma	HeidelbergCement
Radnik	(Serbia) Slavko Petrović	(Bosnia and Herzegovina) Velibor Đurić	Joma	WWin
Sarajevo	(Bosnia and Herzegovina) Vinko Marinović	(North Macedonia) Krste Velkoski	Nike	Turkish Airlines
Sloboda	(Bosnia and Herzegovina) Gradimir Crnogorac	(Bosnia and Herzegovina) Amar Beganović	Legea	WWin
Široki Brijeg	(Bosnia and Herzegovina) Toni Karačić	(Bosnia and Herzegovina) Dino Ćorić	Legea	WWin
Tuzla City	(Bosnia and Herzegovina) Zlatan Nalić	(Bosnia and Herzegovina) Samir Efendić	No1	—
Velež	(Bosnia and Herzegovina) Feđa Dudić	(Bosnia and Herzegovina) Denis Zvonić	No1	Bosnalijek
Zrinjski	(Bosnia and Herzegovina) Mladen Žižović	(Bosnia and Herzegovina) Pero Stojkić	Macron	PPD
Zvijezda 09	(Serbia) Perica Ognjenović	(Bosnia and Herzegovina) Aleksandar Vojinović	Nike / Hummel	—
Željezničar	(Bosnia and Herzegovina) Amar Osim	(Bosnia and Herzegovina) Semir Štilić	Umbro	Whirlpool

== League table ==
Pos	Team	Pld	W	D	L	GF	GA	GD	Pts	Qualification or relegation
1	Sarajevo (C)	22	13	6	3	38	19	+19	45	Qualification for the Champions League first qualifying round
2	Željezničar	22	12	6	4	43	21	+22	42	Qualification for the Europa League first qualifying round
3	Zrinjski Mostar	22	11	5	6	30	12	+18	38	Qualification for the Europa League first qualifying round
4	Borac Banja Luka	22	10	6	6	29	23	+6	36	Qualification for the Europa League first qualifying round
5	Tuzla City	22	10	5	7	27	29	−2	35	
6	Radnik Bijeljina	22	10	4	8	34	21	+13	34	
7	Široki Brijeg	22	8	8	6	31	26	+5	32	
8	Velež Mostar	22	9	5	8	25	23	+2	32	
9	Sloboda Tuzla	22	4	9	9	21	35	−14	21	
10	Mladost Doboj Kakanj	22	4	6	12	21	35	−14	18	
11	Čelik Zenica (Note: Čelik were initially relegated to the Prva Liga FBiH, but were then excluded from the league on 13 July 2020.) (R, D)	22	5	5	12	17	33	−16	17 (Note: Čelik were deducted 3 points due to debts that they didn't pay off on time.)	Excluded from Bosnian professional football, relegated to the League of Zenica-Doboj Canton
12	Zvijezda 09 (R)	22	1	5	16	12	51	−39	8	Relegation to the Prva Liga RS

Source: Rezultati.com
Rules for classification: 1) Points; 2) Goal difference; 3) Goals scored; 4) Head-to-head points; 5) Head-to-head goal difference; 6) Head-to-head away goals (only if two teams); 7) Head-to-head goals scored; 8) Goal difference; 9) Play-off. (Criteria 2 and 3 are not used to decide champion, UEFA competition qualification, or relegation)
(C) Champions; (D) Disqualified; (R) Relegated

=== Positions by table ===
The table lists the positions of teams after each week of matches. In order to preserve chronological evolvements, any postponed matches are not included to the round at which they were originally scheduled, but added to the full round they were played immediately afterwards.

Team ╲ Round	1	2	3	4	5	6	7	8	9	10	11	12	13	14	15	16	17	18	19	20	21	22
Sarajevo	5	4	1	3	2	1	3	2	3	3	2	2	1	1	1	2	1	2	1	1	1	1
Željezničar	6	1	2	1	1	2	1	3	2	1	1	3	2	2	2	1	2	1	2	2	2	2
Zrinjski	9	9	10	9	9	4	4	4	4	4	4	5	6	6	6	5	6	6	5	4	3	3
Borac	6	5	7	4	4	7	5	8	7	6	6	6	5	4	3	3	5	3	3	3	4	4
Tuzla City	1	7	4	2	3	3	2	1	1	2	3	1	4	5	4	4	3	4	4	5	5	5
Radnik	7	6	9	10	11	9	6	5	5	5	5	4	3	3	5	6	4	5	6	6	6	6
Široki Brijeg	10	10	5	7	8	8	9	9	9	9	7	8	7	7	8	7	7	7	7	7	7	7
Velež	11	11	12	11	10	11	11	10	10	10	10	10	9	8	7	8	8	8	8	8	8	8
Sloboda	3	2	8	6	6	6	7	6	6	7	8	9	10	10	10	10	10	9	10	10	10	9
Mladost Doboj Kakanj	2	8	6	8	7	10	10	11	11	11	11	11	11	11	11	11	11	11	9	9	9	10
Čelik	4	3	3	5	5	5	8	7	8	8	9	7	8	9	9	9	9	10	11	11	11	11
Zvijezda 09	12	12	11	12	12	12	12	12	12	12	12	12	12	12	12	12	12	12	12	12	12	12

Leader
UEFA Europa League First qualifying round
Relegation to First League of FBiH/First League of RS

Source: BH Telecom Premier League BiH

== Results ==
=== Rounds 1–22 ===
Home \ Away	BOR	ČEL	MDK	RAD	SAR	ŠB	SLO	TUZ	VEL	Z09	ZRI	ŽEL
Borac	—	3–1	0–0	2–0	0–2	1–1	2–1	2–0	3–1	1–0	0–0	3–0
Čelik	1–2	—	1–0	1–1	0–0	2–0	0–0	0–0	0–2	2–1	0–2	0–2
Mladost Doboj Kakanj	1–1	4–2	—	0–4	0–3	2–3	2–0	0–1	2–2	1–0	0–2	0–2
Radnik	1–2	2–1	3–0	—	1–1	0–0	3–2	3–0	0–1	5–1	1–0	0–0
Sarajevo	1–0	2–0	2–1	2–1	—	3–0	3–0	6–2	2–1	2–0	1–0	1–3
Široki Brijeg	2–2	0–1	3–2	3–0	0–0	—	2–0	1–3	1–0	4–0	1–1	3–3
Sloboda	3–1	2–1	0–0	2–1	1–1	2–2	—	1–1	0–0	1–0	0–3	0–4
Tuzla City	2–1	1–0	1–0	0–3	2–1	1–0	2–1	—	0–0	3–0	0–0	2–2
Velež	2–1	1–2	1–3	0–1	1–2	1–0	2–2	2–1	—	2–0	1–0	1–1
Zvijezda 09	0–2	2–2	1–1	1–4	1–1	0–0	1–1	1–5	1–2	—	2–0	0–3
Zrinjski	4–0	3–0	1–1	1–0	0–0	1–3	2–0	4–0	1–0	3–0	—	2–1
Željezničar	0–0	3–0 (Note: Željezničar was given a 3–0 win by default in Round 15 since the match was postponed because of Čelik's unpaid debts on time to their former players and staff.)	2–1	1–0	5–2	1–2	2–2	1–0	0–2	6–0	1–0	—

Source: Football Association of Bosnia and Herzegovina
Legend: Blue = home team win; Yellow = draw; Red = away team win.
For upcoming matches, an "a" indicates there is an article about the rivalry between the two participants.

== Top goalscorers ==
Rank	Player	Club	Goals
1	(Bosnia and Herzegovina) Mersudin Ahmetović	Sarajevo	13
2	(Bosnia and Herzegovina) Sulejman Krpić	Željezničar	12
2	(Serbia) Vojo Ubiparip	Tuzla City	12
2	(Bosnia and Herzegovina) Stojan Vranješ	Borac	12
5	(Brazil) Brandao	Velež	10
6	(Bosnia and Herzegovina) Semir Štilić	Željezničar	8
7	(Bosnia and Herzegovina) Amer Bekić	Sloboda	7
7	(Bosnia and Herzegovina) Vladimir Bradonjić	Radnik	7
7	(Bosnia and Herzegovina) Velibor Đurić	Radnik	7
