= Ikić =

Ikić is a Croatian surname. Notable people with the surname include:

- Frane Ikić (born 1994), footballer
- Ivan Ikić (born 1999), footballer
- Kristina Ikić Baniček (born 1975), politician
- Matea Ikić (born 1989), volleyballer
