= Muharem Trako =

Bosnian footballer

Personal information
- Date of birth: 27 September 2003 (age 23)
- Place of birth: Zenica, Bosnia and Herzegovina
- Height: 1.80 m (5 ft 11 in)
- Position: Centre-back

Team information
- Current team: Rudar Prijedor
- Number: 18

Youth career
- 2015–2020: Mladost Doboj Kakanj
- 2020–2021: Sarajevo

Senior career*
Years	Team	Apps	(Gls)
2021–2024	Sarajevo	34	(0)
2024	→ Sileks (loan)	9	(0)
2024	→ Tuzla City (loan)	7	(0)
2025	Stupčanica Olovo	23	(1)
2025–	Rudar Prijedor	2	(0)

International career
2019	Bosnia and Herzegovina U16	2	(0)
2019	Bosnia and Herzegovina U17	9	(3)
2020	Bosnia and Herzegovina U18	2	(0)
2021	Bosnia and Herzegovina U19	9	(0)
- * Club domestic league appearances and goals as of 12 June 2026

Muharem Trako (born 27 September 2003) is a Bosnian professional footballer who plays as a centre-back for Bosnian Premier League club Rudar Prijedor.

== Club career ==
On 22 June 2021, Trako signed his first professional contract with Sarajevo. On 16 January 2024, Sarajevo sent Trako on loan to Sileks until the end of the season. On 4 September 2024, Trako was loaned to Tuzla City. In January 2025, Trako joined the First League of FBiH club Stupčanica Olovo.

== Career statistics ==
=== Club ===
As of match played 1 June 2025

Appearances and goals by club, season and competition
Club	Season	League			National cup (Note: Includes Bosnia and Herzegovina Cup, Federation of Bosnia and Herzegovina Cup)		Continental		Total	
Club	Season	Division	Apps	Goals	Apps	Goals	Apps	Goals	Apps	Goals
Sarajevo	2021–22	Bosnian Premier League	12	0	0	0	0	0	12	0
Sarajevo	2022–23	Bosnian Premier League	19	0	1	0	—		20	0
Sarajevo	2023–24	Bosnian Premier League	3	0	1	0	1 (Note: Appearance(s) in UEFA Europa Conference League)	0	5	0
Sarajevo	Total		34	0	2	0	1	0	37	0
Sileks (loan)	2023–24	Macedonian First League	9	0	0	0	—		9	0
Tuzla City (loan)	2024–25	First League of FBiH	7	0	1	0	—		8	0
Stupčanica Olovo	2024–25	First League of FBiH	11	0	—		—		11	0
Career total			61	0	3	0	1	0	65	0

== Honours ==
Stupčanica Olovo

- First League of FBiH: 2024–25
