= Almedin Ziljkić =

Bosnian footballer

Almedin Zilkić
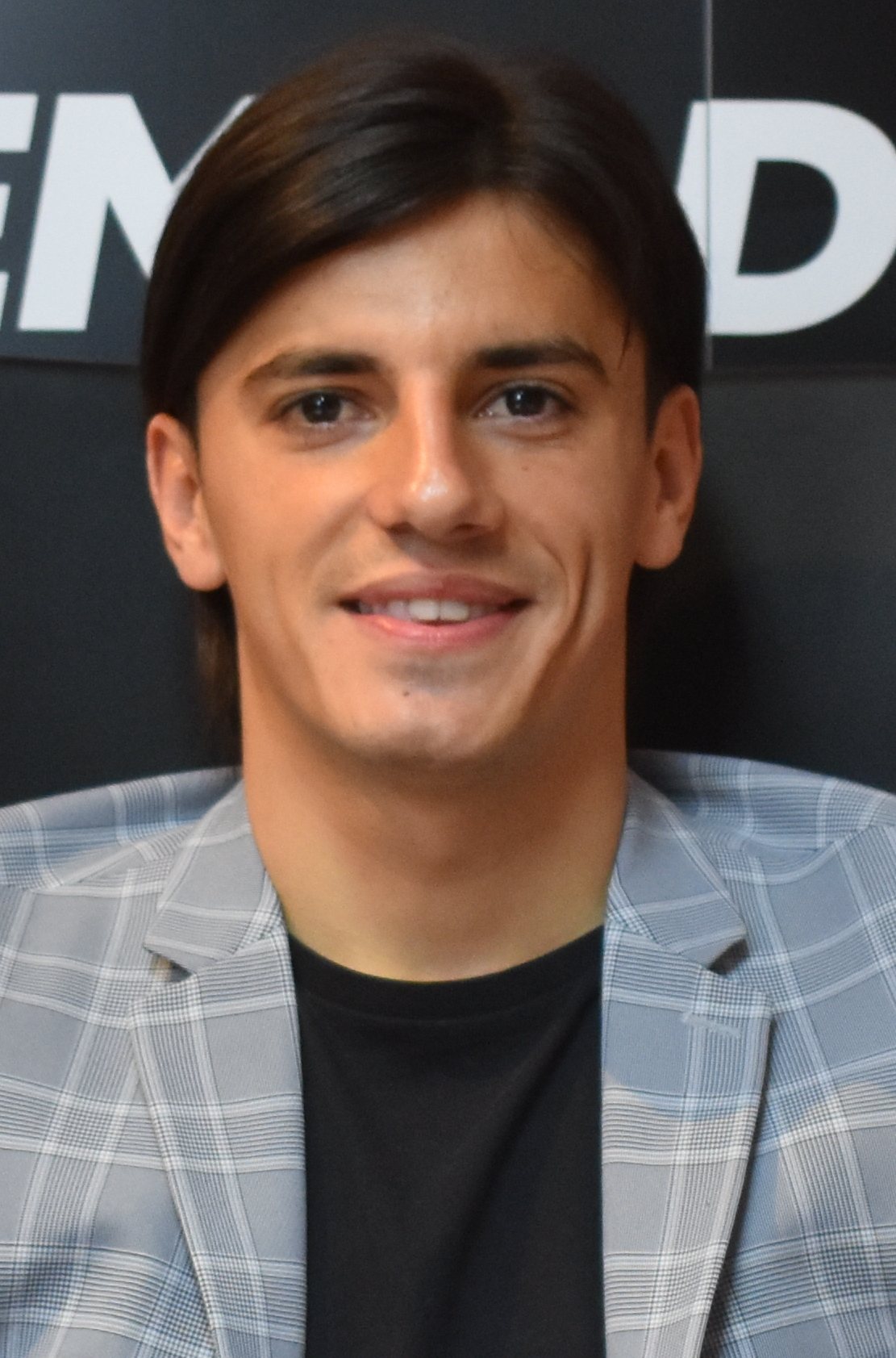
- Ziljkić in 2021

Personal information
- Full name: Almedin Zilkić
- Date of birth: 25 February 1996 (age 30)
- Place of birth: Novi Pazar, FR Yugoslavia
- Height: 1.74 m (5 ft 9 in)
- Position: Left winger

Youth career
- –2014: Novi Pazar
- 2015: Vojvodina

Senior career*
Years	Team	Apps	(Gls)
2015	Donji Srem	0	(0)
2015–2016	Novi Pazar	22	(0)
2016	Gorica	11	(0)
2017	Sloboda Tuzla	27	(2)
2018	Tuzla City	21	(4)
2019–2021	Borac Banja Luka	51	(9)
2021–2022	Olimpija Ljubljana	45	(8)
2023–2024	Sarajevo	27	(8)
2024	Esteghlal	0	(0)
2024–2025	Novi Pazar	19	(1)
2025	Velež Mostar	9	(0)
Total		232	(32)

International career
2020–2023	Bosnia and Herzegovina	3	(0)
- * Club domestic league appearances and goals

Almedin Ziljkić (born 25 February 1996) is a Bosnian former professional footballer who played as left winger.

== International career ==
In October 2020, Ziljkić was called up to represent the Bosnia and Herzegovina national team, for a friendly game against Iran and for the 2020–21 UEFA Nations League games against the Netherlands and Italy. He debuted in an away loss against the Netherlands on 15 November 2020.

== Career statistics ==
=== Club ===
Appearances and goals by club, season and competition
Club	Season	League			National cup (Note: Includes Serbian Cup, Bosnian Cup, Slovenian Cup)		Continental		Total	
Club	Season	Division	Apps	Goals	Apps	Goals	Apps	Goals	Apps	Goals
Novi Pazar	2015–16	Serbian SuperLiga	22	0	1	0	—		23	0
Gorica	2016–17	Prva HNL	11	0	—		—		11	0
Sloboda Tuzla	2016–17	Bosnian Premier League	11	1	—		—		11	1
Sloboda Tuzla	2017–18	Bosnian Premier League	16	1	2	0	—		18	1
Sloboda Tuzla	Total		27	2	2	0	0	0	29	2
Tuzla City	2017–18	First League of FBiH	12	2	—		—		12	2
Tuzla City	2018–19	Bosnian Premier League	9	2	1	0	—		10	2
Tuzla City	Total		21	4	1	0	0	0	22	4
Borac Banja Luka	2018–19	First League of RS	9	2	—		—		9	2
Borac Banja Luka	2019–20	Bosnian Premier League	14	0	2	0	—		16	0
Borac Banja Luka	2020–21	Bosnian Premier League	28	7	3	2	2 (Note: Appearances in UEFA Europa League)	0	33	9
Borac Banja Luka	2021–22	Bosnian Premier League	—		—		1 (Note: Appearance in UEFA Champions League)	0	1	0
Borac Banja Luka	Total		51	9	5	2	3	0	59	11
Olimpija Ljubljana	2021–22	Slovenian PrvaLiga	29	7	1	0	0	0	30	7
Olimpija Ljubljana	2022–23	Slovenian PrvaLiga	16	1	2	1	4 (Note: Appearances in UEFA Europa Conference League)	0	22	2
Olimpija Ljubljana	Total		45	8	3	1	4	0	52	9
Sarajevo	2022–23	Bosnian Premier League	14	5	—		—		14	5
Sarajevo	2023–24	Bosnian Premier League	13	3	1	0	2	1	16	4
Sarajevo	Total		27	8	1	0	2	1	30	9
Novi Pazar	2024–25	Serbian SuperLiga	19	1	3	0	—		22	1
Velež Mostar	2025–26	Bosnian Premier League	9	0	—		—		9	0
Career total			232	32	16	3	9	1	257	36

=== International ===
Appearances and goals by national team and year
National team	Year	Apps	Goals
Bosnia and Herzegovina
Bosnia and Herzegovina	2020	1	0
Bosnia and Herzegovina	2021	1	0
Bosnia and Herzegovina	2023	1	0
Total		3	0

== Honours ==
Borac Banja Luka

- Bosnian Premier League: 2020–21
- First League of RS: 2018–19
