= Bakir Nurković =

Bosnian footballer

Personal information
- Date of birth: 5 April 2005 (age 21)
- Place of birth: Rožaje, Serbia and Montenegro
- Height: 1.78 m (5 ft 10 in)
- Position: Attacking midfielder

Youth career
- Sarajevo

Senior career*
Years	Team	Apps	(Gls)
2023–2026	Sarajevo	3	(0)
2024–2025	→ Igman Konjic (loan)	15	(1)
2026	→ Bokelj (loan)	13	(0)

International career
2019	Bosnia and Herzegovina U15	3	(0)
2020	Bosnia and Herzegovina U16	4	(0)
2021	Bosnia and Herzegovina U17	6	(0)
2022	Bosnia and Herzegovina U18	1	(0)
2023–	Bosnia and Herzegovina U19	6	(0)
- * Club domestic league appearances and goals as of 25 May 2026

Bakir Nurković (born 5 April 2005) is a Bosnian professional footballer who plays as an attacking midfielder. He has represented Bosnia and Herzegovina at various youth levels.

== Club career ==
=== Sarajevo ===
Nurković is a graduate of the FK Sarajevo Academy after which he was transferred to the first team in 2023, making 2 senior appearances in the Premier League of Bosnia and Herzegovina as of June 2025.

=== Loan to Igman Konjic ===
On 1 August 2024, he moved to top-tier side FK Igman Konjic on loan until 30 June 2025. He made 15 league appearances and scored once, featuring regularly in the starting lineup.

=== Return to Sarajevo ===
In June 2025 he returned to Sarajevo. On 21 June 2025 he signed a new contract with the club which will keep him at the Koševo stadium until 2026.

== International career ==
Nurković has appeared across multiple Bosnia and Herzegovina youth national teams.

== Career statistics ==
=== Club ===
As of match played 24 May 2026

Appearances and goals by club, season and competition
Club	Season	League			National cup (Note: Includes Bosnia and Herzegovina Cup)		Continental		Total	
Club	Season	Division	Apps	Goals	Apps	Goals	Apps	Goals	Apps	Goals
Sarajevo	2022–23	Bosnian Premier League	2	0	—		—		2	0
Sarajevo	2023–24	Bosnian Premier League	0	0	1	0	0	0	1	0
Sarajevo	2024–25	Bosnian Premier League	0	0	—		—		0	0
Sarajevo	2025–26	Bosnian Premier League	1	0	0	0	0	0	1	0
Sarajevo	Total		3	0	1	0	—		4	0
Igman Konjic (loan)	2024–25	Bosnian Premier League	15	1	2	0	—		17	1
Bokelj (loan)	2025–26	Montenegrin First League	13	0	—		—		13	0
Career total			31	1	3	0	0	0	34	1
