= Nemanja Miljanović =

Swedish former professional footballer (born 1971)

Personal information
- Date of birth: 4 August 1971 (age 55)
- Place of birth: Teslić, SFR Yugoslavia
- Position: Midfielder

Team information
- Current team: Östersund (manager)

Youth career
- –1990: IF Elfsborg

Senior career*
Years	Team	Apps	(Gls)
1990–1996	IF Elfsborg		
1996–1999	Hércules	45	(2)
1998	→ Salamanca (loan)	3	(0)
1999–2000	IF Elfsborg		

Managerial career
- 2008: Proleter Teslić
- 2010–2012: Alfaz del Pi
- 2012–2013: El Altet
- 2013–2014: Elche (youth)
- 2014: Syrianska (youth)
- 2015: Syrianska
- 2017: IF Elfsborg
- 2018–2019: Eskilstuna
- 2020–2021: Mladost Doboj Kakanj
- 2021–2022: Borac Banja Luka
- 2022: Botev Plovdiv II
- 2023: Krumovgrad
- 2024–2025: Nordic United
- 2026–: Östersund
- * Club domestic league appearances and goals

Nemanja Miljanović (born 4 August 1971) is a Swedish football coach and former player who is the manager of Östersund.

He played as a midfielder for Elfsborg, Hércules and Salamanca.

== Playing career ==
Miljanović arrived in Sweden at the age of 15. He played for Elfsborg, Hércules and was loaned out to Salamanca.

== Managerial career ==
After retiring as a player, Miljanović enjoyed a brief spell as manager of Bosnian side Proleter Teslić in 2008. In 2010, he managed at the lowest level of Spanish football with Alfaz del Pi. On 15 January 2018, he became the manager of Superettan side Eskilstuna.

On 24 August 2020, Miljanović was named manager of Bosnian Premier League club Mladost Doboj Kakanj. Five days later, on 29 August, in his first game as manager, Mladost beat Olimpik in a league match. He suffered his first loss as Mladost manager against Zrinjski Mostar two weeks later, on 12 September. Miljanović left Mladost at the end of the 2020–21 season.

On 18 August 2021, he became the new manager of Borac Banja Luka. On 22 August 2021, in Miljanović's debut game as Borac manager, his team drew against Rudar Prijedor in a league match. Seven days later, on 29 August, he recorded his first win as the club's manager, beating Radnik Bijeljina. On 3 April 2022, Miljanović resigned as manager following a disappointing league draw against Rudar Prijedor the previous day.

Shortly after, Miljanović became a part of Botev Plovdiv II's coaching staff. On 22 August 2022, he was appointed head coach of the team. At the end of December 2022, he was appointed manager of FC Krumovgrad.

During the rest of the season under Miljanović's helm Krumovgrad earned promotion to the top-tier of the Bulgarian league system. On 28 October, despite a somewhat successful start in the Bulgarian top-flight for Krumovgrad, Miljanović was replaced as manager.

After managing Nordic United, he became manager of Östersund for the 2026 season.

== Personal life ==
Miljanović's son Daniel is also a professional footballer.

== Managerial statistics ==
As of 7 August 2026

Managerial record by team and tenure
Team	Nat	From	To	Record				
Team	Nat	From	To	G	W	D	L	Win %
Syrianska	(Sweden)	1 January 2015	31 December 2015	33	13	10	10	39.39
IF Elfsborg	(Sweden)	27 September 2017	31 December 2017	0	0	0	0	—
Eskilstuna	(Sweden)	1 January 2018	5 September 2019	57	20	20	17	35.09
Mladost Doboj Kakanj	(Bosnia and Herzegovina)	24 August 2020	30 June 2021	29	7	5	17	24.14
Borac Banja Luka	(Bosnia and Herzegovina)	19 August 2021	3 April 2022	24	13	9	2	54.17
Botev Plovdiv II	(Bulgaria)	8 August 2022	7 January 2023	12	5	1	6	41.67
Krumovgrad	(Bulgaria)	8 January 2023	28 October 2023	31	13	9	9	41.94
Nordic United	(Sweden)	29 September 2024	31 December 2025	34	22	5	7	64.71
Östersund	(Sweden)	1 January 2026	Present	21	10	7	4	47.62
Total				241	103	66	72	42.74
