= Enedin Mulalić =

Bosnian footballer

Personal information
- Date of birth: 10 January 2004 (age 22)
- Place of birth: Bužim, Bosnia and Herzegovina
- Height: 1.80 m (5 ft 11 in)
- Position: Right-back

Team information
- Current team: Llapi
- Number: 2

Youth career
- –2022: Sarajevo

Senior career*
Years	Team	Apps	(Gls)
2022–2024	Sarajevo	16	(1)
2024	→ Zvijezda 09 (loan)	8	(0)
2024	Sloboda Tuzla	4	(0)
2025	Posušje	9	(0)
2025–	Llapi	20	(0)

International career
2021	Bosnia and Herzegovina U18	4	(0)
2022–	Bosnia and Herzegovina U19	9	(0)
- * Club domestic league appearances and goals as of 1 June 2026

Enedin Mulalić (born 10 January 2004) is a Bosnian professional footballer who plays as a right-back for Kosovo Superleague club Llapi.

== Club career ==
In April 2022, Mulalić signed for Sarajevo. He made his debut against Pošusje on 23 October 2022. On 24 January 2024, Mulalić was sent on loan to Zvijezda 09 until the end of the season.

== Career statistics ==
As of match played 31 May 2024

Appearances and goals by club, season and competition
Club	Season	League			National cup (Note: Includes Bosnia and Herzegovina Cup)		Total	
Club	Season	Division	Apps	Goals	Apps	Goals	Apps	Goals
Sarajevo	2022–23	Bosnian Premier League	14	1	0	0	14	1
Sarajevo	2023–24	Bosnian Premier League	2	0	—		2	0
Sarajevo	Total		16	1	0	0	16	1
Zvijezda 09 (loan)	2023–24	Bosnian Premier League	8	0	—		8	0
Sloboda Tuzla	2024–25	Bosnian Premier League	4	0	—		4	0
Posušje	2024–25	Bosnian Premier League	9	0	1	0	10	0
Career total			37	1	1	0	38	1
