= Nemanja Tomašević =

Serbian footballer

Personal information
- Date of birth: 8 September 1999 (age 27)
- Place of birth: Istočno Sarajevo, Bosnia and Herzegovina
- Height: 1.84 m (6 ft 0 in)
- Position: Left back

Team information
- Current team: Čelik Zenica
- Number: 27

Youth career
- 2011–2014: Famos Vojkovići
- 2014–2017: Red Star Belgrade
- 2017–2018: Rad

Senior career*
Years	Team	Apps	(Gls)
2018–2019	Rapid Wien II	21	(2)
2019	Rudar Velenje	5	(0)
2020	Smederevo 1924	5	(0)
2020	Sloboda Tuzla	19	(1)
2021–2022	TSC	9	(0)
2021–2022	→ Tuzla City (loan)	19	(0)
2022–2023	Sarajevo	25	(0)
2023–2024	Radnik Surdulica	33	(1)
2025	Sloga Doboj	14	(0)
2025–2026	Gol Gohar	16	(0)
2026–	Čelik Zenica	7	(0)

International career
2015	Serbia U17	3	(1)
- * Club domestic league appearances and goals as of 31 October 2026

Nemanja Tomašević (born 9 August 1999) is a Serbian professional footballer who plays as a left back for Bosnian Premier League club Čelik Zenica. He is a former Serbian youth international.

== Career statistics ==
=== Club ===
As of match played 31 October 2026

Appearances and goals by club, season and competition
Club	Season	League			National cup (Note: Includes Serbian Cup, Bosnian Cup, Hazfi Cup)		Total	
Club	Season	Division	Apps	Goals	Apps	Goals	Apps	Goals
Rapid Wien II	2018–19	Regionalliga East	21	2	—		21	2
Rudar Velenje	2019–20	Slovenian PrvaLiga	5	0	—		5	0
Smederevo 1924	2019–20	Serbian First League	5	0	—		5	0
Sloboda Tuzla	2020–21	Bosnian Premier League	19	1	—		19	1
TSC	2020–21	Serbian SuperLiga	8	0	1	0	9	0
TSC	2021–22	Serbian SuperLiga	1	0	—		1	0
TSC	Total		9	0	1	0	10	0
Tuzla City (loan)	2021–22	Bosnian Premier League	19	0	4	0	23	0
Sarajevo	2022–23	Bosnian Premier League	25	0	1	0	26	0
Radnik Surdulica	2023–24	Serbian SuperLiga	24	1	—		24	1
Radnik Surdulica	2024–25	Serbian First League	9	0	1	1	10	1
Radnik Surdulica	Total		33	1	1	1	34	2
Sloga Doboj	2024–25	Bosnian Premier League	12	0	—		12	0
Sloga Doboj	2025–26	Bosnian Premier League	2	0	—		2	0
Sloga Doboj	Total		14	0	—		14	0
Gol Gohar	2025–26	Persian Gulf Pro League	16	0	1	0	17	0
Čelik Zenica	2026–27	Bosnian Premier League	7	0	1	0	8	0
Career total			173	4	9	1	181	5
