= Haris Dilaver =

Bosnian professional footballer

Personal information
- Full name: Haris Dilaver
- Date of birth: 6 February 1990 (age 36)
- Place of birth: Zenica, SFR Yugoslavia
- Height: 1.87 m (6 ft 1 1/2 in)
- Position: Winger

Team information
- Current team: Valletta
- Number: 9

Senior career*
Years	Team	Apps	(Gls)
2008–2012	Čelik Zenica	45	(2)
2012–2014	Vitez	47	(13)
2014–2016	Mladost Doboj Kakanj	58	(20)
2016–2017	Platanias	3	(0)
2017	Čelik Zenica	14	(6)
2017–2018	Mladost Doboj Kakanj	29	(7)
2018–2019	Čelik Zenica	46	(12)
2020	Nasaf	6	(0)
2020–2021	Vllaznia Shkodër	34	(11)
2021–	Valletta	1	(0)
- * Club domestic league appearances and goals as of 21:41, 7 March 2021 (UTC)

Haris Dilaver (born 6 February 1990) is a Bosnian professional footballer who plays as a winger for Maltese Premier League club Valletta.

== Honours ==
Mladost Doboj Kakanj

- First League of FBiH: 2014–15
