= Ilija Martinović =

Montenegrin footballer

Ilija Martinović Илија Мартиновић
Personal information
- Date of birth: 31 January 1994 (age 32)
- Place of birth: Cetinje, Montenegro, FR Yugoslavia
- Height: 1.93 m (6 ft 4 in)
- Position: Defender

Team information
- Current team: Mornar
- Number: 25

Senior career*
Years	Team	Apps	(Gls)
2012–2017	Lovćen	74	(2)
2013–2014	→ Cetinje (loan)	12	(0)
2017–2020	Aluminij	63	(0)
2020–2022	Maribor	27	(2)
2022	Chornomorets Odesa	0	(0)
2022	→ Dečić (loan)	6	(0)
2022	Pakhtakor Tashkent	7	(0)
2023	Sarajevo	12	(2)
2023	Bnei Sakhnin	3	(0)
2024	Spartak Subotica	9	(0)
2024–2025	Sutjeska Nikšić	10	(0)
2025	Kyzylzhar	16	(1)
2025–	Mornar	30	(3)

International career
2015	Montenegro U21	1	(0)
2021	Montenegro	3	(0)
- * Club domestic league appearances and goals as of 1 June 2026

Ilija Martinović (Serbian Cyrillic: Илија Мартиновић; born 31 January 1994) is a Montenegrin footballer who plays as a defender for Mornar.

== Club career ==
In June 2020, Martinović signed a three-year contract with Slovenian PrvaLiga side Maribor. He left the club in January 2022 after his contract was mutually terminated. In the same month, he signed a contract with the Ukrainian Premier League team Chornomorets Odesa. However, he left Ukraine just a month later when the Russian invasion of Ukraine started, and joined his homeland team Dečić on loan. In January 2023, Martinović signed a two-and-a-half-year contract with Bosnian Premier League side Sarajevo.

== International career ==
Martinović made one appearance for the Montenegro under-21 team in March 2015. He made his debut for the senior team on 27 March 2021 in a World Cup qualifier against Gibraltar.

== Career statistics ==
=== International ===
Appearances and goals by national team and year
National team	Year	Apps	Goals
Montenegro	2021	3	0
Total		3	0
