= Ivan Ikić =

Croatian footballer (born 1999)

Personal information
- Full name: Ivan Ikić
- Date of birth: 13 September 1999 (age 27)
- Place of birth: Đakovo, Croatia
- Height: 1.80 m (5 ft 11 in)
- Positions: Right winger; midfielder

Team information
- Current team: Hrvace
- Number: 29

Youth career
- Zrinski Drenje
- Đakovo Croatia
- 2009–2016: Osijek

Senior career*
Years	Team	Apps	(Gls)
2016–2019	Osijek	1	(0)
2016–2019	Osijek	1	(0)
2018	→ Lučko (loan)	14	(1)
2019	→ Međimurje (loan)	10	(2)
2019–2020	Međimurje	17	(3)
2020–2022	Široki Brijeg	48	(9)
2022–2023	Sarajevo	19	(5)
2023	→ Gençlerbirliği (loan)	9	(0)
2024	GOŠK Gabela	30	(2)
2025	Zrinski Osječko 1664	14	(0)
2025	BSK Bijelo Brdo	14	(0)
2026–	Hrvace	16	(4)

International career
2015	Croatia U16	4	(0)
- * Club domestic league appearances and goals as of 17 June 2026

Ivan Ikić (born 13 September 1999) is a Croatian professional footballer who plays as a right winger for NK Hrvace. Ikić started his professional career at Osijek.

== Club career ==
=== Osijek ===
Ikić started practicing football at his local club Zrinski Drenje, moving on to Đakovo Croatia before joining the NK Osijek academy at the age of 9. After he passed all categories in Osijek, he didn't get that many chances in the first team. He played his only appearance for the Osijek team in the 2016/17 season in the last round against the RNK Split team, registering one minute.

=== Loans to Lučko and Međimurje ===
In February 2018, he signed for Lučko on loan until the end of the season. For the team from Novi Zagreb, he played fourteen time and score one goal.

In February of the following year, he signed for Međimurje on loan until the end of the season. By the end of the season, he scored two goals in ten appearances.

=== Međimurje ===
After more than three years spent in Osijek, he left the club as a free agent because his contract expired. He signed for the club from Čakovec on a one-year contract. In the only season spent in the North of Croatia, he made seventeen appearances in the league and one in the cup. After his contract expired, he failed to reach an agreement with the club's leaders to extend a new one, so he was left without a club.

=== Široki Brijeg ===
In August 2020, he signed a multi-year contract for the Bosnian club Široki Brijeg. After an excellent half-season in Siroki Brijeg in April 2021, there was speculation in the media that Pogoń Szczecin was interested in Ikić. Unfortunately, that transfer did not happen, so Ikić stayed in Široki Brijeg until 2022. In 2022, his contract with the club from Široki Brijeg expired, so he looked for a new environment where he would settle down.

=== Sarajevo ===
With the arrival of a new coach in Sarajevo, Ikić also found himself on the list of desirable players in Sarajevo. So in June of the same year he signed a contract with Sarajevo for two years with the right to extend it for another year. In the club from Koševo, he did great and is the club's leading scorer this season. On 7 September 2023, Ikić and Sarajevo mutually agreed on his contract termination.

=== Gençlerbirliği (loan) ===
On 8 February 2023, Ikić joined Gençlerbirliği in Turkey on a season-long loan.

== Career statistics ==
=== Club ===
As of match played 9 December 2024

Appearances and goals by club, season and competition
Club	Season	League			National cup (Note: Includes Croatian Cup, Bosnia and Herzegovina Cup, Turkish Cup)		Continental		Total	
Club	Season	Division	Apps	Goals	Apps	Goals	Apps	Goals	Apps	Goals
Osijek	2016–17	Croatian First League	1	0	0	0	—		1	0
Osijek	2017–18	Croatian First League	0	0	0	0	0	0	0	0
Osijek	2018–19	Croatian First League	0	0	0	0	0	0	0	0
Osijek	Total		1	0	0	0	0	0	1	0
Lučko (loan)	2017–18	Croatian Second League	14	1	0	0	—		14	1
Međimurje (loan)	2018–19	Croatian Second League	10	2	0	0	—		10	2
Međimurje	2019–20	Croatian Second League	17	3	1	0	—		18	3
Međimurje	Total		27	5	1	0	—		28	5
Široki Brijeg	2020–21	Bosnian Premier League	25	5	3	0	—		28	5
Široki Brijeg	2021–22	Bosnian Premier League	23	4	3	0	2 (Note: Appearance(s) in UEFA Europa Conference League)	0	28	4
Široki Brijeg	Total		48	9	6	0	2	0	56	9
Sarajevo	2022–23	Bosnian Premier League	17	5	1	0	—		18	5
Sarajevo	2023–24	Bosnian Premier League	2	0	0	0	1	0	3	0
Sarajevo	Total		19	5	1	0	1	0	21	5
Gençlerbirliği (loan)	2022–23	1. Lig	9	0	0	0	—		9	0
GOŠK Gabela	2023–24	Bosnian Premier League	15	1	0	0	—		15	1
GOŠK Gabela	2024–25	Bosnian Premier League	15	1	1	0	—		16	1
GOŠK Gabela	Total		30	2	1	0	—		31	2
Career total			148	22	9	0	3	0	160	22
