= Fahrudin Šolbić =

Bosnian professional football manager (born 1958)

Personal information
- Full name: Fahrudin Šolbić
- Date of birth: 23 October 1958 (age 68)
- Place of birth: Kakanj, FPR Yugoslavia

Managerial career
- Years: Team
- Rudar Kakanj
- 2019–2020: Mladost Doboj Kakanj

Fahrudin Šolbić (born 23 October 1958) is a Bosnian professional football manager.

He was most recently manager of Bosnian Premier League club Mladost Doboj Kakanj, firstly as caretaker manager and then as permanent manager. Šolbić was also manager of Rudar Kakanj.

== Managerial statistics ==
As of 1 August 2020

Managerial record by team and tenure
Team	Nat	From	To	Record							
Team	Nat	From	To	G	W	D	L	GF	GA	GD	Win %
Mladost Doboj Kakanj	(Bosnia and Herzegovina)	27 November 2019	1 August 2020	6	1	2	3	8	14	−6	16.67
Total				6	1	2	3	8	14	−6	16.67
