= Adnan Džafić =

Bosnian footballer (born 1990)

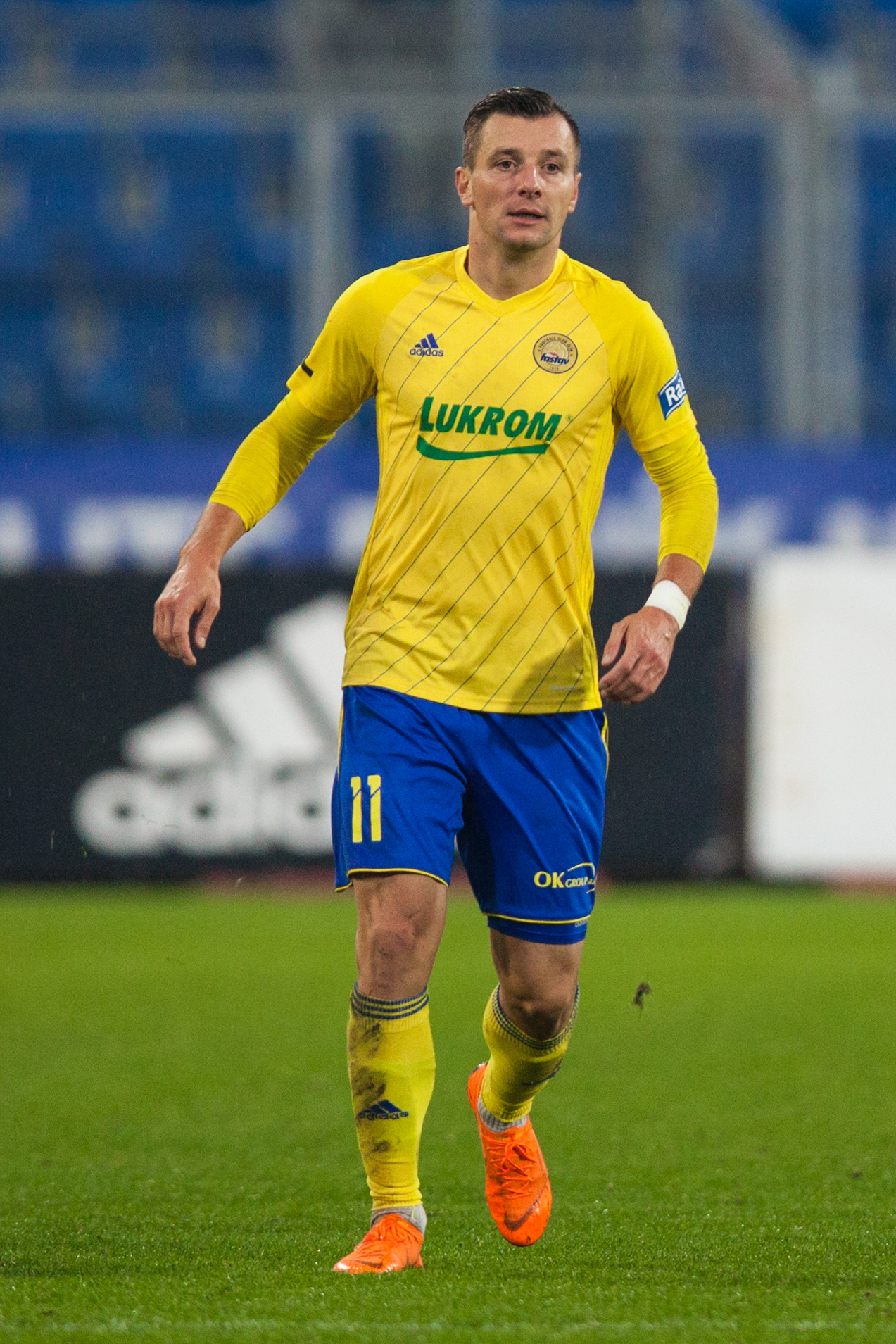
- Džafić with Fastav Zlín in 2019

Personal information
- Date of birth: 10 May 1990 (age 36)
- Place of birth: Visoko, SR Bosnia and Herzegovina, SFR Yugoslavia
- Height: 1.86 m (6 ft 1 in)
- Position: Midfielder

Team information
- Current team: Sloboda Tuzla
- Number: 10

Senior career*
Years	Team	Apps	(Gls)
–2010	Bosna Visoko		
2010–2012	Čáslav	54	(7)
2012–2017	MAS Táborsko	128	(30)
2017–2020	Fastav Zlín	72	(7)
2018	→ Mladá Boleslav (loan)	10	(1)
2020–2022	Tuzla City	54	(14)
2022–2023	Sarajevo	27	(2)
2023–2024	Velež Mostar	20	(2)
2024–2025	Sloboda Tuzla	15	(1)
2025–	SC Wolfsthal		
- * Club domestic league appearances and goals as of 23 May 2025

Adnan Džafić (born 10 May 1990) is a Bosnian professional footballer who plays as a midfielder for Austrian amateur club SC Wolfsthal.

== Career ==
In 2010, Džafić almost signed with Dinamo Zagreb, Croatia's most successful club, from First League of FBiH side Bosna Visoko, Bosnia and Herzegovina's second division. After that, he joined Czech second division side Čáslav, where he made 54 league appearances and scored 7 goals. On 7 April 2010, Džafić made his league debut for Čáslav during a 1–2 loss to Vlašim. On 7 April 2010, he scored his first goal for Čáslav during a 1–2 loss to Vlašim.

In 2017, Džafić signed with Fastav Zlín in the Czech top flight. In July 2020, he joined Bosnian Premier League club Tuzla City.

== Honours ==
Fastav Zlín

- Czechoslovak Supercup: 2017
