= MGM Farm Arena =

Stadium in Doboj, Bosnia and Herzegovina

Mladost Kakanj Stadium
- Interactive map of Mladost Kakanj Stadium
- Location: Doboj (Kakanj), Bosnia and Herzegovina
- Capacity: 3,500

Tenants
- FK Mladost Doboj Kakanj

Mladost Kakanj Stadium is a multi-use stadium in Doboj (Kakanj), Bosnia and Herzegovina. It is the home ground of First League of the Federation of Bosnia and Herzegovina side Mladost. The stadium has capacity of 3,500 spectators with 2,359 seats.
