= Doboj (Kakanj) =

Village in Kakanj, Bosnia and Herzegovina

Doboj Добој
- Village
- Location within Bosnia and Herzegovina
- Coordinates: 44°06′48″N 18°07′04″E
- Country: Bosnia and Herzegovina
- Entity: Federation of Bosnia and Herzegovina
- Canton: Zenica-Doboj
- Municipality: Kakanj

Area
  - Total: 1.07 sq mi (2.76 km^{2})

Population (2013)
  - Total: 2,549
  - Density: 2,390/sq mi (924/km^{2})
- Time zone: UTC+1 (CET)
  - Summer (DST): UTC+2 (CEST)

Doboj (Cyrillic: Добој) is a village in the municipality of Kakanj, Bosnia and Herzegovina.

== Demographics ==
According to the 2013 census, its population was 2,549.

Ethnicity in 2013
Ethnicity	Number	Percentage
Bosniaks	2,400	94.2%
Croats	47	1.8%
Serbs	6	0.2%
other/undeclared	96	3.8%
Total	2,549	100%
