= FK Mladost Doboj Kakanj =

Mladost Doboj-Kakanj
- Full name: Fudbalski klub Mladost Doboj-Kakanj
- Nicknames: Crvena legija (The Red Legion); Bosanski Hoffenheim (The Bosnian Hoffenheim)
- Founded: 25 May 1959 (67 years ago)
- Ground: MGM Farm Arena
- Capacity: 3,000
- Chairman: Mensur Mušija
- Manager: Goran Brkić (player-manager)
- League: Second League of FBiH (Center)
- 2023–24: First League of FBiH, 16th of 16 (relegated)
- Website: fkmladost.ba
Home colours	Away colours

Fudbalski klub Mladost Doboj-Kakanj, commonly referred to as simply Mladost (lit. 'Youth'), is a professional association football club from the village of Doboj near the town of Kakanj that is situated in central Bosnia and Herzegovina.

The club currently plays in the Second League of the Federation of Bosnia and Herzegovina (Group Center) and plays its home matches on the MGM Farm Arena in Doboj (Kakanj), which has a capacity of 3,000 seats.

== History ==
The club was founded in 1959, on the foundations of FK Doboj, which was founded in 1956 and played in the league of the labour sports games of Kakanj.

In the 2009–10 season, the club was first in the League of the Zenica-Doboj Canton and was promoted to the Second League of FBIH (Group Center), where they finished in 4th place in the first season. The club played in the first round of the Bosnian Cup in the 2008–09 season. In 2013, Mladost finished in first place in the Second League of FBIH (Group Center) and were promoted to the First League of FBiH.

In the 2014–15 season of the First League of FBIH, the club finished 1st and earned itself promotion to the Bosnian Premier League.

Mladost's so far biggest ever success came in the 2016–17 season, when the club made it all the way to the semi-final of the 2016–17 Bosnia and Herzegovina Football Cup. On their way to the semi-final, Mladost eliminated Rudar Prijedor, Slavija Sarajevo and Bosna Union (at that time still known as Bosna Sema), before getting eliminated by Sarajevo in the semi-final.

In the 2020–21 Premier League season, Mladost initially avoided relegation to the First League of FBiH, but were then relegated back to the league due to failing to obtain a license for the Premier League.

== Honours ==
=== Domestic ===
==== League ====
- First League of the Federation of Bosnia and Herzegovina:
  - Winners (1): 2014–15
- Second League of the Federation of Bosnia and Herzegovina:
  - Winners (1): 2012–13 (center)
- League of Zenica-Doboj Canton:
  - Winners (1): 2009–10

==== Cups ====
- Bosnia and Herzegovina Cup:
  - Semi-finalists (1): 2016–17

== Players ==
=== Current squad ===
As of 16 February 2022

Note: Flags indicate national team as defined under FIFA eligibility rules; some limited exceptions apply. Players may hold more than one non-FIFA nationality.

No.	Pos.	Nation	Player
1	GK	BIH	Filip Vasilj
12	GK	BIH	Hanan Sejmen
2	DF	BIH	Faruk Piljug
31	DF	BIH	Nikola Cicović
3	DF	BIH	Faris Prcić
99	DF	BIH	Emir Hodžurda
5	DF	BIH	Faris Hasić
4	DF	BIH	Faruk Omerbegović
55	DF	BIH	Zlatan Imamović
14	DF	BIH	Tarik Mehić

No.	Pos.	Nation	Player
10	MF	BIH	Anes Hrustanović
8	MF	BIH	Faruk Jusić
23	MF	BIH	Anel Dedić
6	MF	BIH	Amil Helja
21	MF	BIH	Rijad Smolo
9	FW	BIH	Mahir Karić
7	FW	BIH	Vladimir Grahovac
17	FW	BIH	Ognjen Radović
11	FW	BIH	Safet Čago
18	FW	BIH	Adnan Berbić

== Club officials ==
=== Coaching staff ===
Name	Role
(Serbia) Goran Brkić	Player-manager
(Bosnia and Herzegovina) Damir Gradaščević	Assistant coach

=== Other information ===
President	(Bosnia and Herzegovina) Mensur Mušija
Player-manager	(Serbia) Goran Brkić

Source: FK Mladost Doboj Kakanj at sportsport.ba

== Managerial history ==
- (Bosnia and Herzegovina) Elvedin Beganović (9 July 2013 – 17 April 2014)
- (Bosnia and Herzegovina) Nijaz Kapo (17 April 2014 – 14 June 2015)
- (Bosnia and Herzegovina) Ibrahim Rahimić (14 June 2015 – 26 September 2016)
- (Bosnia and Herzegovina) Husref Musemić (27 September 2016 – 1 June 2017)
- (Bosnia and Herzegovina) Edis Mulalić (11 June 2017 – 8 April 2018)
- (Bosnia and Herzegovina) Nermin Šabić (11 April 2018 – 16 August 2018)
- (Bosnia and Herzegovina) Adnan Zildžović (17 August 2018 – 8 April 2019)
- (Bosnia and Herzegovina) Elvedin Beganović (8 April 2019 (Note: Beganović served as caretaker manager until 6 June 2019, when he was hired on a permanent basis.) – 10 September 2019)
- (Bosnia and Herzegovina) Ibrahim Rahimić (10 September 2019 – 27 November 2019)
- (Bosnia and Herzegovina) Fahrudin Šolbić (27 November 2019 (Note: Šolbić served as caretaker manager until 17 December 2019, when he was hired on a permanent basis.) – 1 August 2020)
- (Bosnia and Herzegovina) Elvedin Beganović (interim) (1 August 2020 – 24 August 2020)
- (Sweden) Nemanja Miljanović (24 August 2020 – 30 June 2021)
- (Bosnia and Herzegovina) Dragan Radović (7 July 2021 – 21 November 2021)
- (Bosnia and Herzegovina) Eldin Čengić (1 January 2022 – 28 April 2022)
- (Bosnia and Herzegovina) Almir Hasanović (28 April 2022 (Note: Hasanović served as caretaker manager until 30 June 2022, when he was hired on a permanent basis.) – 27 April 2023)
- (Bosnia and Herzegovina) Mirnes Buza (27 April 2023 – 30 June 2023)
- (Bosnia and Herzegovina) Almir Hasanović (7 August 2023 – 31 December 2023)
- (Bosnia and Herzegovina) Damir Gradaščević (1 January 2024 – 2 April 2024)
- (Bosnia and Herzegovina) Fadil Žerić (2 April 2024 – 17 April 2024)
- (Serbia) Goran Brkić (player-manager) (17 April 2024 – present)
