= List of FK Željezničar Sarajevo managers =

Fudbalski klub Željezničar Sarajevo is a professional football club based in Sarajevo, Bosnia and Herzegovina. This chronological list comprises all those who have held the position of manager of the first team of Željezničar from 1922, when the first professional manager was appointed, to the present day. Each manager's entry includes his dates of tenure, major honours won and significant achievements under his leadership. Caretaker managers are included, where known. As of the 2026–27 season, Željezničar has had 69 managers.

The first manager of Željezničar was Adolf Šmit. He managed the club for one season. Josip Šebalj is the club's longest-serving manager, managing Željezničar for 11 years.

The most successful Željezničar manager in terms of trophies won is Amar Osim, who won five Bosnian Premier League titles, four Bosnian Cups and one Bosnian Supercup. Milan Ribar, Amar Osim and his father, Ivica Osim, are the three managers with the most managerial appearances for Željezničar.

== List of managers ==
The complete list of Željezničar managers is shown in the following table:

Information correct as of the match played on 21 November 2026. Only competitive matches are counted.

Manager	Nat.	From	To	G	W	D	L	Win%^{[A]}	Honours	Notes
Adolf Šmit	(Kingdom of Yugoslavia)	1922	1923	2	1	0	1	50.00		^{[B]}
Josip Šebalj	(Kingdom of Yugoslavia)	1923	1934	82	35	7	40	42.68		^{[C]}
Milovan Adamović	(Kingdom of Yugoslavia)	1934	1935	12	5	0	7	41.67		
Vilim Novak	(Kingdom of Yugoslavia)	1935	1936	10	0	2	8	0.00		
Petar Bugarinović	(Kingdom of Yugoslavia)	1936	1939	34	6	3	25	17.65		
Dušan Marković	(Kingdom of Yugoslavia)	1939	1941	18	11	2	5	61.11		
Zdravko Pavlić	(Socialist Federal Republic of Yugoslavia)	1945	1945	0	0	0	0	—		
Milan Rajlić	(Socialist Federal Republic of Yugoslavia)	1945	1947	29	10	5	14	34.48	1 Bosnian Republic League	
Ivica Medarić	(Socialist Federal Republic of Yugoslavia)	1947	1947	10	3	2	5	30.00		
Mensur Bajrami (interim)	(Socialist Federal Republic of Yugoslavia)	1947	1948	7	3	1	3	42.86		
František Bičiště	(Czechoslovakia)	1948	1949	23	13	4	6	56.52		
Josip Bulat	(Socialist Federal Republic of Yugoslavia)	1949	1949	18	11	4	3	61.11		
Stevo Maslavarić	(Socialist Federal Republic of Yugoslavia)	1950	1950	10	3	3	4	30.00		
Aleksandar Petrović	(Socialist Federal Republic of Yugoslavia)	1950	1950	11	2	2	7	18.18		
Slavko Zagorac	(Socialist Federal Republic of Yugoslavia)	1951	1951	35	12	9	14	34.29		
Zdravko Pavlić	(Socialist Federal Republic of Yugoslavia)	1952	1953	22	16	3	3	72.73		
Branislav Hrnjiček	(Socialist Federal Republic of Yugoslavia)	1953	1954	33	19	6	8	57.58		
Prvoslav Dragićević	(Socialist Federal Republic of Yugoslavia)	1954	1955	45	18	4	23	40.00		
Milutin Pajević	(Socialist Federal Republic of Yugoslavia)	1955	1955	3	0	3	0	0.00		
Mensur Bajrami	(Socialist Federal Republic of Yugoslavia)	1955	1956	4	2	1	1	50.00		
Branko Šalipur	(Socialist Federal Republic of Yugoslavia)	1956	1956	13	4	3	6	30.77		
Miroslav Brozović	(Socialist Federal Republic of Yugoslavia)	1956	1958	77	41	13	23	53.25		
László Fenyvesi	(Hungary)	1958	1959	11	3	2	6	27.27		
Mensur Bajrami	(Socialist Federal Republic of Yugoslavia)	1959	1959	6	2	0	4	33.33		
Dimitrije Tadić	(Socialist Federal Republic of Yugoslavia)	1959	1960	7	6	0	1	85.71		
Branko Stanković	(Socialist Federal Republic of Yugoslavia)	1960	1960	22	12	4	6	54.55		
Joško Domorocki	(Socialist Federal Republic of Yugoslavia)	1960	1961	2	1	0	1	50.00		
Vlatko Konjevod	(Socialist Federal Republic of Yugoslavia)	1961	1964	81	40	17	24	49.38		
Munib Saračević	(Socialist Federal Republic of Yugoslavia)	1964	1965	45	18	14	13	40.00		
Josip Babić	(Socialist Federal Republic of Yugoslavia)	1965	1966	24	9	8	7	37.50		
Marcel Žigante	(Socialist Federal Republic of Yugoslavia)	1966	1967	70	35	15	20	50.00		
Milan Ribar	(Socialist Federal Republic of Yugoslavia)	1967	1976	344	151	90	103	43.90	1 Yugoslav First League	
Vasilije Radović (interim)	(Socialist Federal Republic of Yugoslavia)	1976	1977	29	8	7	14	27.59		
Sulejman Rebac	(Socialist Federal Republic of Yugoslavia)	1977	1978	39	23	8	8	58.97		
Ivica Osim	(Socialist Federal Republic of Yugoslavia)	1978	1986	301	118	81	102	39.20		
Boris Bračulj	(Socialist Federal Republic of Yugoslavia)	1986	1987	25	7	8	10	28.00		
Mile Prnjatović	(Socialist Federal Republic of Yugoslavia)	1987	1987	14	8	2	4	57.14		
Blagoje Bratić	(Socialist Federal Republic of Yugoslavia)	1987	1988	37	10	14	13	27.03		
Josip Bukal	(Socialist Federal Republic of Yugoslavia)	1988	1988	9	1	2	6	11.11		
Mišo Smajlović; Boris Bračulj (interim)	(Socialist Federal Republic of Yugoslavia)	1988	1989	11	4	1	6	36.36		
Nedeljko Gugolj	(Socialist Federal Republic of Yugoslavia)	1989	1989	17	8	2	7	47.06		
Mišo Smajlović	(Socialist Federal Republic of Yugoslavia)	1989	1991	74	26	20	28	35.14		
Milan Ribar	(Socialist Federal Republic of Yugoslavia)	1991	1992	23	8	4	11	34.78		
Mišo Smajlović	(Bosnia and Herzegovina)	1994	1997	67	31	9	27	46.27		
Tarik Hodžić (interim)	(Bosnia and Herzegovina)	1997	1997	14	7	1	6	50.00		
Dino Đurbuzović	(Bosnia and Herzegovina)	1997	1997	16	7	6	3	43.75		
Boris Bračulj	(Bosnia and Herzegovina)	1997	1998	15	6	2	7	40.00		
Enver Hadžiabdić	(Bosnia and Herzegovina)	1998	1999	39	19	10	10	48.72	1 Bosnian First League; 1 Bosnian Supercup	
Nedžad Verlašević	(Bosnia and Herzegovina)	1999	30 June 1999	20	8	7	5	40.00		
Enver Hadžiabdić	(Bosnia and Herzegovina)	1 July 1999	30 June 2000	38	22	8	8	57.89	1 Bosnian Cup	
Dino Đurbuzović	(Bosnia and Herzegovina)	1 July 2000	28 February 2001	27	18	3	6	66.67	1 Bosnian Supercup	
Amar Osim	(Bosnia and Herzegovina)	1 March 2001	10 October 2003	150	93	35	22	62.00	2 Bosnian Premier League; 2 Bosnian Cup; 1 Bosnian Supercup	^{[D]}
Milomir Odović	(Bosnia and Herzegovina)	11 October 2003	10 June 2004	20	15	1	4	75.00		
Jiří Plíšek	(Czech Republic)	11 June 2004	29 October 2004	18	11	2	5	61.11		
Ismet Štilić (interim)	(Bosnia and Herzegovina)	30 October 2004	31 December 2004	6	3	1	2	50.00		
Ivo Ištuk	(Bosnia and Herzegovina)	5 January 2005	31 May 2005	15	5	4	6	33.33		
Ratko Ninković	(Bosnia and Herzegovina)	1 June 2005	12 March 2006	23	10	5	8	43.48		
Almir Memić (interim)	(Bosnia and Herzegovina)	12 March 2006	27 June 2006	14	5	3	6	35.71		
Nenad Starovlah	(Bosnia and Herzegovina)	27 June 2006	19 September 2006	7	2	2	3	28.57		
Dželaludin Muharemović (interim)	(Bosnia and Herzegovina)	19 September 2006	31 December 2006	14	5	4	5	35.71		
Enver Hadžiabdić	(Bosnia and Herzegovina)	10 January 2007	18 January 2008	33	17	3	13	51.52		
Simo Krunić	(Bosnia and Herzegovina)	18 January 2008	24 November 2008	34	15	4	15	44.12		
Demir Hotić	(Bosnia and Herzegovina)	31 December 2008	31 May 2009	14	7	0	7	50.00		
Amar Osim	(Bosnia and Herzegovina)	22 June 2009	19 September 2013	144	85	28	31	59.03	3 Bosnian Premier League; 2 Bosnian Cup	^{[D]}
Dino Đurbuzović	(Bosnia and Herzegovina)	19 September 2013	6 June 2014	22	13	7	2	59.09		
Admir Adžem	(Bosnia and Herzegovina)	6 June 2014	15 December 2014	22	11	7	4	50.00		
Almir Memić	(Bosnia and Herzegovina)	17 December 2014	7 January 2015	0	0	0	0	—		
Milomir Odović	(Bosnia and Herzegovina)	8 January 2015	11 September 2015	28	15	8	5	53.57		
Vlado Čapljić	(Bosnia and Herzegovina)	11 September 2015	29 September 2015	4	3	0	1	75.00		
Edis Mulalić	(Bosnia and Herzegovina)	29 September 2015	7 May 2016	23	16	4	3	69.57		
Haris Alihodžić (interim)	(Bosnia and Herzegovina)	7 May 2016	30 May 2016	1	0	1	0	0.00		
Miloš Kostić	(Slovenia)	30 May 2016	22 August 2016	6	2	1	3	33.33		
Slavko Petrović	(Serbia)	24 August 2016	23 July 2017	36	21	10	5	58.33		
Admir Adžem	(Bosnia and Herzegovina)	23 July 2017	4 June 2018	40	26	7	7	65.00	1 Bosnian Cup	
Slobodan Krčmarević	(Serbia)	4 June 2018	30 July 2018	5	3	0	2	60.00		
Milomir Odović	(Bosnia and Herzegovina)	30 July 2018	27 November 2018	18	7	4	7	38.89		
Amar Osim	(Bosnia and Herzegovina)	31 December 2018	11 April 2021	68	34	16	18	50.00		
Blaž Slišković	(Bosnia and Herzegovina)	14 April 2021	1 June 2021	4	0	1	3	0.00		
Tomislav Ivković	(Croatia)	18 June 2021	24 December 2021	21	7	8	6	33.33		
Edis Mulalić	(Bosnia and Herzegovina)	7 January 2022	6 April 2023	43	18	14	11	41.86		
Nermin Bašić	(Bosnia and Herzegovina)	12 April 2023	1 November 2023	26	10	4	12	38.46		
Haris Alihodžić (interim)	(Bosnia and Herzegovina)	1 November 2023	7 November 2023	1	1	0	0	100.00		
Abdulhakeem Al-Tuwaijri	(Saudi Arabia)	7 November 2023	2 January 2024	5	0	1	4	0.00		
Bruno Akrapović	(Bosnia and Herzegovina)	8 January 2024	20 April 2024	9	2	2	5	22.22		
Dino Đurbuzović (interim)	(Bosnia and Herzegovina)	20 April 2024	12 June 2024	6	5	1	0	83.33		
Denis Ćorić	(Bosnia and Herzegovina)	12 June 2024	19 May 2025	37	23	5	9	62.16		
Admir Adžem	(Bosnia and Herzegovina)	10 June 2025	7 December 2025	20	7	6	7	35.00		
Slaviša Stojanović	(Slovenia)	29 December 2025	22 February 2026	4	1	0	3	25.00		
Savo Milošević	(Serbia)	3 March 2026	14 May 2026	11	4	5	2	36.36		
David Muslera Rodríguez	(Spain)	14 July 2026	21 November 2026	15	4	4	7	26.67		

== Honours ==
Rank	Manager	YL	RL	FL	PL	BC	BS	Total
1	(Bosnia and Herzegovina) Amar Osim	–	–	–	5	4	1	10
2	(Bosnia and Herzegovina) Enver Hadžiabdić	–	–	1	–	1	1	3
3	(Socialist Federal Republic of Yugoslavia) Milan Rajlić	–	1	–	–	–	–	1
3	(Socialist Federal Republic of Yugoslavia) Milan Ribar	1	–	–	–	–	–	1
3	(Bosnia and Herzegovina) Dino Đurbuzović	–	–	–	–	–	1	1
3	(Bosnia and Herzegovina) Admir Adžem	–	–	–	–	1	–	1

== Notes ==
A. Win % is rounded to two decimal places.

B. The club's first manager.

C. Longest-serving manager in club history.

D. Most honours won.
