= Boris Bračulj =

Bosnian Croat footballer and manager (1939–2019)

Boris "Boro" Bračulj
Personal information
- Full name: Boris Bračulj
- Date of birth: 4 August 1939
- Place of birth: Sinj, Kingdom of Yugoslavia
- Date of death: 26 July 2019 (aged 79)
- Place of death: Sarajevo, Bosnia and Herzegovina
- Position: Forward

Youth career
- 1954–1955: Junak Sinj
- 1955–1957: Igman Ilidža

Senior career*
Years	Team	Apps	(Gls)
1957–1960	Igman Ilidža		
1960–1963	Čelik Zenica		
1963–1969	Željezničar	97	(18)

International career
1962–1964	Yugoslavia Olympic		

Managerial career
- Željezničar (youth)
- Jedinstvo Bihać
- Iskra Bugojno
- Leotar
- 1978–1986: Željezničar (assistant)
- 1986–1987: Željezničar
- 1988–1989: Željezničar (caretaker)
- 1997–1998: Željezničar
- 2000–2001: Olimpik
- * Club domestic league appearances and goals

Boris "Boro" Bračulj (4 August 1939 – 26 July 2019) was a Bosnian Croat former professional football player and football manager who was originally from Croatia.

== Club career ==
Bračulj started playing youth football in his hometown's Junak Sinj in 1954. A year later, he moved to Sarajevo suburb Ilidža and began playing for Igman. He played for the youth squad until he became a part of the first team in 1957.

He also played for Čelik Zenica before moving to Željezničar in 1963. He played in 97 league matches for the club, scoring 18 goals. Bračulj retired from active football in 1969.

== International career ==
While playing for Čelik Zenica in 1962, Bračulj was called up to the Yugoslavia Olympic football team for the 1964 Summer Olympics.

== Managerial career ==
After finishing his playing career, Bračulj stayed in football as a manager. He is considered to be one of the best Bosnian football fitness coaches. He worked in the Željezničar youth squads, and then as a manager of Jedinstvo Bihać, Iskra Bugojno and Leotar. In 1978, Bračulj became an assistant manager to Ivica Osim in Željezničar. He was also Željezničar manager on two occasions, the first occasion being from 1986 to 1987, and second one being from 1997 to 1998.

During a period in the 1988–89 season, Bračulj held the caretaker manager role at Željezničar alongside Mišo Smajlović. His last managerial position was that of Olimpik manager from 2000 to 2001.

== Death ==
Bračulj died at the age of 79 on 26 July 2019 in Sarajevo, Bosnia and Herzegovina.
