= Almir Memić (footballer, born 1962) =

Bosnian football manager (born 1962)

Personal information
- Date of birth: 1 March 1962 (age 64)
- Place of birth: Sarajevo, FPR Yugoslavia
- Height: 1.83 m (6 ft 0 in)
- Position: Forward

Senior career*
Years	Team	Apps	(Gls)
1979–1982	Famos Hrasnica	1	(0)
1982–1986	Čelik Zenica	50	(1)
1988–1989	Šibenik	24	(2)
1989–1990	Borac Banja Luka	38	(0)
1990–1991	Konyaspor	3	(0)
1991	Novi Sad		
1991–1992	Mogren	16	(2)
1992–1993	Pazinka	38	(1)
1994	Primorac	1	(0)
1997–2000	Željezničar	27	(8)

Managerial career
- 2006: Željezničar (caretaker)
- 2014–2015: Željezničar
- 2015–2016: Travnik
- 2017: Goražde
- 2018: Travnik
- 2018: Metalleghe-BSI
- 2024: Famos Hrasnica
- * Club domestic league appearances and goals

Almir Memić (born 1 March 1962) is a Bosnian professional football manager and former player.

== Playing career ==
Memić started playing football in Famos Hrasnica. After that, he played in various clubs from SR Bosnia and Herzegovina and other parts of former Yugoslavia; Čelik Zenica, Borac Banja Luka, Šibenik, Novi Sad, Mogren and Pazinka.

Memić also played for Konyaspor in the Turkish Süper Lig before he returned to Bosnia and Herzegovina in 1991.

He played for Željezničar during the late 1990s and early 2000s. Memić had collected 27 league appearances and scored 8 goals in three years at Željezničar and in 1998 won both the Bosnian First League and the Bosnian Supercup. In 2000, he won the Bosnian Cup. Memić ended his career at Željezničar in 2000 at the age of 38.

== Managerial career ==
After finishing his playing career, Memić started working as a manager in Željezničar. He was first an assistant manager, and then, in March 2006, he was promoted to the position of manager of Željezničar, after Ratko Ninković had resigned. As he was just a replacement, Memić led the team only until the end of the season.

He came back to Željezničar in 2009, where he was an assistant of Amar Osim (2009–2013), Hajrudin "Dino" Đurbuzović (2013–2014) and Admir Adžem (2014), before once again becoming the manager of Željezničar in December 2014 replacing Adžem. However, less than a month later, in January 2015, Memić was controversially sacked without a game as Željezničar's manager, and Milomir Odović was named the new manager of the club.

After Željezničar, Memić managed Travnik from 2015 until 2016. From August to November 2016, he was for a second time the assistant manager of Amar Osim, this time at Qatar Stars League club Al Kharaitiyat. Memić also managed Goražde in 2017 and once again Travnik in 2018. On 2 October 2018, he was named manager of First League FBiH club Metalleghe-BSI. He left Metalleghe on 31 December 2018.

In January 2019, Memić was for a third time appointed as an assistant manager at Željezničar, again under the management of Osim. In June 2022, Velež Mostar appointed him as the club's new assistant manager, following Amar Osim becoming its manager.

On 19 January 2024, Memić was appointed manager of Second League of FBiH club Famos Hrasnica.

== Honours ==
=== Player ===
Čelik Zenica

- Yugoslav Second League: 1982–83, 1984–85

Željezničar

- Bosnian First League: 1997–98
- Bosnian Cup: 1999–2000
- Bosnian Supercup: 1998

=== Manager ===
Famos Hrasnica

- Second League of FBiH: 2023–24 (Center)
