= Joško =

Joško is a Croatian masculine given name that may refer to the following notable people:

- Joško Battestin (1918–2020), Slovene electrical engineer, inventor and author
- Joško Bilić (born 1974), Croatian football player
- Joško Čagalj Jole (born 1972), Croatian pop singer
- Joško Domorocki (1917–1992), Bosnian-Herzegovinian football player
- Joško Farac (born 1969), Croatian football defender
- Joško Gluić (born 1951), Yugoslav football midfielder
- Joško Gvardiol (born 2002), Croatian football defender
- Joško Hajder (born 1994), Croatian football midfielder and forward
- Joško Janša (1900–?), Slovenian cross-country skier
- Joško Jeličić (born 1971), Croatian football midfielder
- Joško Kreković (born 1969), Croatian former water polo player and coach
- Joško Marušić (born 1952), Croatian illustrator and author of animated films
- Joško Milenkoski volleyball coach of the Turkish national team
- Joško Popović (born 1966), Croatian football striker
- Joško Španjić (born 1966), Croatian football manager and former player
- Joško Svaguša (born 1972), Croatian entrepreneur and politician
- Joško Topić (born 1983), Croatian tennis player
- Joško Vidošević (1935–1990), Croatian football forward
- Joško Vlašić (born 1956), Croatian athletics coach and former decathlete
