= Nenad Starovlah =

Bosnian football manager (born 1955)

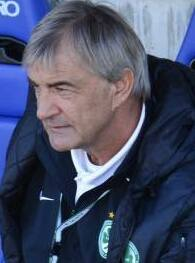
- Starovlah with Omonia in 2015

Personal information
- Full name: Nenad Starovlah
- Date of birth: 29 July 1955 (age 71)
- Place of birth: Sarajevo, FPR Yugoslavia
- Height: 1.88 m (6 ft 2 in)
- Position: Defender

Youth career
- –1972: Željezničar

Senior career*
Years	Team	Apps	(Gls)
1972–1982	Željezničar	137	(4)
Total		137	(4)

International career
1978–1980	Yugoslavia	2	(0)

Managerial career
- 1985–1987: Yugoslavia U21 (assistant)
- 1987–1990: Yugoslavia U16
- 1989–1991: Yugoslavia Olympic
- 1992–1993: Hajduk Kula
- 1993–1994: Borac Čačak
- 1994: Ethnikos Piraeus
- 1998: Apollon Limassol
- 1999–2000: Enosis Neon Paralimni
- 2000–2001: Sutjeska Nikšić
- 2002–2006: Apollon Limassol (academy technical director)
- 2006: Željezničar
- 2008–2016: Omonia (team manager)
- 2025–2026: Željezničar (youth school director)
Medal record
Men's Football
Representing Yugoslavia
Mediterranean Games
Gold medal – first place	1979 Split	Team
- * Club domestic league appearances and goals

Nenad Starovlah (Serbian Cyrillic: Ненад Старовлах; Greek: Νέναντ Στάροβλαχ; born 29 July 1955) is a Bosnian professional football manager and former player. He also holds Cypriot citizenship.

== Club career ==
Born in Sarajevo, Starovlah was chosen as the best young player at the tournament of the Republic Championship and was after the tournament called up to the first team of hometown club Željezničar in July 1972. He later on played 137 league games for Željezničar from 1972 till 1982, and as a defender nevertheless scored 18 goals. He was part of the team that played in the 1980–81 Yugoslav Cup final against Velež Mostar which they lost 3–2. He retired from professional football in 1982 at the age of 27 because of a serious knee injury.

== International career ==
Starovlah got a chance to play in two games for the Yugoslavia national team, with whom he won the gold medal at the 1979 Mediterranean Games in Split.

== Managerial career ==
=== Early career ===
After ending his playing career in 1982, Starovlah took over the U10 side of Željezničar and for eight years he managed the team, winning six republic titles of Bosnia and Herzegovina. Due to the fact that sixteen of these players from that generation signed a professional contract with the first team, Starovlah became an assistant manager of the Željezničar first team in 1991 under Milan Ribar. War in Yugoslavia began in 1992 and as a result the team split. Many of these players continued their career abroad like Mario Stanić, Elvir Baljić, Marijo Dodik, Boris Vasković, Veldin Karić and others. Starovlah also took over the Yugoslav U16 national team in 1987. The team reached the finals of the 1990 UEFA European Under-16 Championship, losing the final to Czechoslovakia by 3–2. During the same period whilst he was the head coach of the Yugoslav U16 team, Starovlah was also the head coach of the Bosnia and Herzevoina U17 national team.

=== Hajduk Kula ===
In 1992, after years of experience in the previous teams managed, Starovlah moved to Serbia and became manager of Hajduk Kula, making great results at the club.

Radoman Vasović, the club's president at the time, declared:

"Even if prior to deciding to assign Starovlah as our manager, we had information about who and what personality he had, it is not till now that we can say that we are absolutely certain that we received what we wanted: a young and professional manager, a person who is fully dedicated to football, who has energy and ambition to achieve the goal that has been set, and who knows how to teach the players how to play football but also to psychologically motivate them to always give their maximum.”

=== Borac Čačak ===
Starovlah then joined Borac Čačak, where the committee of the club considered that he was the ideal manager to help their team achieve their major goal which was to get promotion to the First League of FR Yugoslavia. In 1994, with Starovlah the team achieved their goal after a thirty-two year wait.

=== Period in Greece and Cypurus ===
In July 1994, Starovlah signed a 1-year contract with, at the time, Super League Greece club Ethnikos Piraeus. After only four months as the club's manager, Starovlah got sacked after a series of bad results. Then, from 1995 until 1999, he worked at Apollon Limassol in Cyprus. He first was first appointed as the club's academy technical advisor, and later in 1998 became manager.

In 1999, Starovlah signed a contract with another Cypriot club, Enosis Neon Paralimni. In the 1999–2000 season, Enosis finished in 8th place in the league and after the end of the season Starovlah left the club.

=== Sutjeska Nikšić ===
Continuing his career, in 2000 Starovlah returned to FR Yugoslavia and became the manager of Sutjeska Nikšić. He stayed there for one year.

=== Željezničar ===
In July 2006, Starovlah was appointed manager of hometown side Željezničar in the Bosnian Premier League. In September 2006, Starovlah was controversaly sacked, even though at the time the team was in 4th place and had only 5 points less than 1st placed club, fierce city rivals Sarajevo.

== Executive career ==
After his managerial post at Sutjeska, Starovlah returned to Apollon to work as the technical director of the academy in 2002. Starovlah managed a number of players who are known to be one of the most successful both in the Cypriot First Division and abroad. On 1 October 2004, the Cypriot newspapers named him “Ο πιο πιστός στρατιώτης,” which in English means “The most dedicated soldier.” From 2008 to 2016, he held the role of team manager at Omonia.

On 29 July 2025, Željezničar announced that Starovlah was named as the club's new director of its youth school. He left the post following the end of the 2025–26 season, and was replaced by Edin Cocalić in November 2026.

== Reception ==
Some players mentioned that Starovlah was their mentor and guided them to their current careers. Zoran Simunović described him as “a high quality manager with many diplomas, who managed to make a lot of success in his career.” Panayiotis Frangeskou named Starovlah to be his “football father,” due to his years of support. Zoran Šaraba stated that “Starovlah is a great expert who is in love with football. He knows how to work, he is ambitious and is a real professional whom everyone loves: players, management and fans." Of course, Starovlah has also been criticized by certain managers and players as well.

== Honours ==
=== Player ===
Yugoslavia

- Mediterranean Games: 1979

=== Manager ===
Borac Čačak

- Second League of FR Yugoslavia: 1993–94
