= Josip Šebalj =

Yugoslav footballer

Personal information
- Position: Goalkeeper

Senior career*
Years	Team	Apps	(Gls)
1921–1927	Željezničar		

Managerial career
- 1923–1934: Željezničar
- * Club domestic league appearances and goals

Josip Šebalj was a Yugoslav professional footballer and football manager. He played as a goalkeeper for Željezničar.

Šebalj later started working as a manager at Željezničar. He is the club's longest-serving manager, managing Željezničar from 1923 to 1934.

== Playing career ==
Šebalj played for Željezničar as a goalkeeper. The club competed in the second division of the Sarajevo football sub-association in the 1921–22 season. The following season, Šebalj led Željezničar as manager in the same league division, alongside Adolf Šmit. He was the club's player-manager until 1927.

== Managerial career ==
In 1923, Šebalj started working full-time as manager of Željezničar. In the 1925–26 season, he led the club to first place in the Sarajevo football sub-association second division, achieving promotion to the first division. In the 1926–27 season, Željezničar finished last in the first division. The club later competed in the first division of the Sarajevo sub-federal league.

Šebalj worked as manager of Željezničar until 1934, making him the longest-serving manager in the club's history.

== See also ==
- List of FK Željezničar Sarajevo managers
