= Amar Osim =

Bosnian football manager (born 1967)

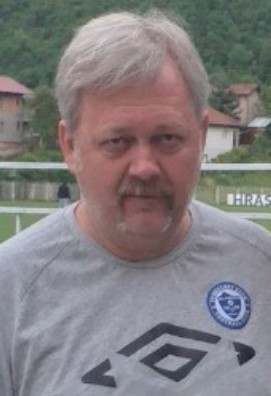
- Osim with Željezničar in 2019

Personal information
- Date of birth: 18 July 1967 (age 59)
- Place of birth: Sarajevo, SR Bosnia and Herzegovina, Yugoslavia
- Height: 1.95 m (6 ft 5 in)
- Position: Midfielder

Youth career
- –1986: Željezničar

Senior career*
Years	Team	Apps	(Gls)
1986–1991	Željezničar	52	(5)
1991–1992	Saint-Dié		
1992–1996	Strasbourg		
1996–1997	Željezničar	7	(1)

Managerial career
- 2001–2003: Željezničar
- 2006–2007: JEF United Chiba
- 2009–2013: Željezničar
- 2014–2016: Al Kharaitiyat
- 2018–2021: Željezničar
- 2022: Velež Mostar
- * Club domestic league appearances and goals

Amar Osim (born 18 July 1967) is a Bosnian professional football manager and former player. Regarded as one of the most successful Bosnian football managers, he is the most decorated manager in the country's domestic football.

Osim was a talented player during his teens. However, he did not transfer his talent after getting called up to the Željezničar first team. Apart from Željezničar, Osim also played in France for Saint-Dié and Strasbourg. He ended his career while at Željezničar in 1997.

Osim decided to stay in football and become a manager. He is the most successful manager in Željezničar's history, winning five Bosnian Premier League titles, four Bosnian cups and one Bosnian Supercup in his three stints with the club. Osim also won the J.League Cup with Japanese club JEF United Chiba in 2006. He managed Qatari club Al Kharaitiyat as well, with mediocre results. In 2022, Osim briefly managed Velež Mostar.

== Playing career ==
Born and raised in Sarajevo, Osim started playing football in hometown club Željezničar. After playing for the youth team, he entered the senior squad in 1986. In 1991, he left for France where he played for lower division clubs Saint-Dié and Strasbourg. In 1996, he returned to his home country. Osim played one more season for Željezničar before retiring.

Although a talented player, with good technical skills, Amar never managed to match the success or renown of his father, Ivica Osim's playing career.

== Managerial career ==
=== Željezničar ===
Osim's managerial career started in Željezničar's youth squad which he guided to success in domestic competitions. After Dino Đurbuzović was sacked in the spring of 2001, club officials promoted him to the place of first team manager.

He immediately led the club to two Bosnian Premier League titles in 2001 and in 2002, being runner-up in 2003.

In August 2002, Osim led Željezničar to the 2002–03 UEFA Champions League third qualifying round, where the club lost 5–0 on aggregate to English Premier League club Newcastle United. That is, so far, the club's best post-war European competition result.

He also claimed two national cup titles in 2001 and 2003, being runner-up in 2002. Osim claimed the Bosnian Supercup in 2001 as well, after winning the double that year. In 2002, he got the award for Bosnian Coach of the Year.

Osim was sacked at the beginning of the 2003–04 season due to poor results.

=== JEF United Chiba ===
Amar's father Ivica Osim invited him to Japan to be his assistant at JEF United Chiba. After Ivica was named the head coach of the Japan national team, Amar got promoted.

He guided JEF United to win the J.League Cup in 2006. But after a poor finish to the 2007 season, in which JEF United finished in 13th place in the J1 League, Osim got sacked.

=== Return to Željezničar ===
After his time in Japan, Osim returned to his hometown and in June 2009, returned to Željezničar for his second spell as the club's manager.

In his first season as manager, Osim immediately guided the club to win the league title and finished as national cup runners-up. In the following season he won the national cup, losing the league title just one round before the end of the season and ending third. In 2012, he claimed the league title once again, with three rounds left to play, breaking many records on the way and also defended the national cup, bringing the double back to Željezničar after eleven years. Željezničar won another title in the 2012–13 season.

Osim left the managerial position in September 2013, subsequently becoming the club's new sporting director. In December 2014, he resigned as sporting director and left Željezničar.

While at the club, Osim won many individual managerial awards after his success with Željezničar, including three Manager of the Season awards, the most out of any manager.

=== Al Kharaitiyat ===
In December 2014, Osim was named the new manager of Qatar Stars League club Al Kharaitiyat.

In his first season, he made a club record of a seven-game unbeaten run in the league and nine games in all competitions. In that season's league, Al Kharaitiyat finished in 9th place. In March 2015, Osim was named Qatar Stars League Manager of the Month for February 2015.

In his second season as the club's manager, Osim's Al Kharaitiyat finished in 12th place, just narrowly missing relegation.

In November 2016, after a poor start to the 2016–17 season, Osim was sacked after almost two years as Al Kharaitiyat's manager.

=== Second return to Željezničar ===
==== 2018–19 season ====
On 31 December 2018, Osim once again came back to Željezničar and signed a three-and-a-half-year contract after monthly speculations of him becoming the manager even earlier.

His first win in his third term as Željezničar's manager came on 3 March 2019, in a 2–1 home league win against Mladost Doboj Kakanj. In Osim's first Sarajevo derby after six years, Željezničar suffered a 3–0 home loss to fierce city rivals FK Sarajevo on 6 April 2019.

On 13 April, in a 1–0 away league loss against Zrinjski Mostar, Osim made his 300th appearance as Željezničar's manager and became the club's third manager with the most games. At the time, the first two were Milan Ribar with 367 games and his father Ivica Osim with 301 games. On 24 April, in his 302nd managerial appearance for Željezničar, in which the club drew 0–0 against Široki Brijeg on their home stadium Grbavica, Osim surpassed his father in managerial appearances for the club.

In the last game of the season, Željezničar beat Tuzla City 3–0 away on 25 May 2019, putting an end to a very turbulent season.

==== 2019–20 season ====
Osim's first win as Željezničar's manager in the 2019–20 season came on 27 July 2019, a 2–0 away league win against Mladost Doboj Kakanj. Željezničar won their first Sarajevo derby since Osim's second return in a 5–2 home league win against Sarajevo on 31 August 2019.

He made a new Bosnian Premier League record with the club on 28 September 2019, after a 2–2 away league draw against Tuzla City, in which Željezničar ended the game unbeaten and continued their 11-game unbeaten run in the league since the beginning of the season, surpassing the one of city rival Sarajevo, which was a ten league game unbeaten run since the start of the 2006–07 Bosnian Premier League season.

On 6 October 2019, Osim's team lost 3–0 away in a league match against Borac Banja Luka, thus ending their 11-game unbeaten run in the league. On 30 November 2019, Željezničar once again beat their rivals Sarajevo, this time in a 3–1 away league win, with Osim being praised from Željezničar fans for his tactical geniusness. In that game, he also earned a yellow card for arguing with referee Haris Kaljanac.

At the end of the season however, Željezničar failed to win any trophy, with Osim's team finishing in 2nd place in the 2019–20 league season, three points short of 1st placed Sarajevo, though after the season ended abruptly due to the COVID-19 pandemic in Bosnia and Herzegovina on 1 June 2020. He also guided the team to the semi-finals of the 2019–20 Bosnian Cup, but did not get the chance to win the competition as it was abandoned due to the pandemic, with no winner being proclaimed.

==== 2020–21 season ====
Željezničar started off the 2020–21 season with a win against Velež Mostar on 1 August 2020, with Osim's team scoring three goals in the first thirty minutes of the game and securing the win at home ground. That game also marked Osim's 200th win as Željezničar manager. With three more league wins after the Velež game, Željezničar suffered its first loss under Osim in the new season on 21 August 2020, an unexpected 1–0 home defeat against Mladost Doboj Kakanj.

In Osim's first European game with Željezničar since his return, his team lost 3–1 against Israeli club Maccabi Haifa in the 2020–21 UEFA Europa League first qualifying round on 9 September 2020.

In the middle of an eight-game winless run in the 2020–21 league season, which had culminated with a home draw against Mladost Doboj Kakanj, Osim was sacked by the club on 11 April 2021.

=== Velež Mostar ===
On 11 June 2022, Osim signed a one-year contract with Velež Mostar, with an option to stay at the club even longer. On 15 July 2022, he took charge for the first time as Velež manager for their Premier League match against Posušje, which ended in a 1–1 draw.

On 28 July, Velež unexpectedly got eliminated from the 2022–23 UEFA Europa Conference League in the second qualifying round by Maltese club Ħamrun Spartans. On 5 August 2022, Osim won his first match as Velež manager after a 3–1 win over his former club Željezničar.

Osim terminated his contract with Velež by mutual consent on 29 November 2022.

== Personal life ==
Osim's father Ivica was a renowned player and manager. His mothers' name is Asima. He has two children and one grandchild. On 1 May 2022, Osim's father died in Graz, Austria, where he had mostly lived since 1994. He was buried in Sarajevo at the Bare Cemetery on 14 May, thirteen days after his death.

== Managerial statistics ==
As of match played 19 November 2022

Managerial record by team and tenure
Team	From	To	Record							
Team	From	To	G	W	D	L	GF	GA	GD	Win %
Željezničar	1 March 2001	10 October 2003	150	93	35	22	259	115	+144	62.00
JEF United Chiba	20 July 2006	31 December 2007	66	25	7	34	101	109	−8	37.88
Željezničar	22 June 2009	19 September 2013	144	85	28	31	245	119	+126	59.03
Al Kharaitiyat	27 December 2014	5 November 2016	42	14	10	18	63	72	−9	33.33
Željezničar	31 December 2018	11 April 2021	68	34	16	18	114	63	+51	50.00
Velež Mostar	11 June 2022	29 November 2022	21	6	9	6	23	21	+2	28.57
Total			491	257	105	129	805	499	+306	52.34

== Honours ==
=== Manager ===
Željezničar

- Bosnian Premier League: 2000–01, 2001–02, 2009–10, 2011–12, 2012–13
- Bosnian Cup: 2000–01, 2002–03, 2010–11, 2011–12
- Bosnian Supercup: 2001

JEF United Chiba

- J.League Cup: 2006

Individual

- Bosnian Coach of the Year: 2002
- Bosnian Premier League Manager of the Season: 2010, 2011–12, 2012–13
- Qatar Stars League Manager of the Month: February 2015

== See also ==
- List of FK Željezničar Sarajevo players
- List of FK Željezničar Sarajevo managers
