= Milan Rajlić =

Yugoslav footballer and football manager

Personal information
- Full name: Milan Rajlić
- Date of birth: 16 October 1916
- Place of birth: Travnik, Austria-Hungary
- Date of death: 10 February 1952 (aged 35)
- Place of death: Kraljevo, FPR Yugoslavia
- Position: Forward

Youth career
- 1931–1933: Rudar Prijedor
- 1933–1935: Slavija Sarajevo

Senior career*
Years	Team	Apps	(Gls)
1935–1941	Slavija Sarajevo	84	(41)
1941–1943	SK Jugoslavija	63	(48)
1943–1945	Sloga Kraljevo	32	(19)
1945–1947	Željezničar	23	(14)
1947–1949	Sarajevo	18	(11)
1949–1952	Sloga Kraljevo	57	(32)

International career
1940	Yugoslavia	1	(0)

Managerial career
- 1945–1947: Željezničar
- 1949–1952: Sloga Kraljevo
- * Club domestic league appearances and goals

Milan Rajlić (16 October 1916 – 10 May 1952) was a Yugoslav professional footballer and football manager.

== Club career ==
Born in Travnik, Austria-Hungary, Rajlić started his football career in the youth team of Rudar Prijedor in 1931. In 1933, he started playing for the youth team of Slavija Sarajevo, before getting called up to the first team of Slavija in 1935. Rajlić made 84 league appearances for Slavija and scored 41 goals.

In 1941, World War II came to Sarajevo, and he continued to play football in Belgrade with SK Jugoslavija, later joining Sloga Kraljevo in 1943 in the Serbian League. Since Slavija Sarajevo got dissolved by the new communist authorities after the war, Rajlić got assigned to Željezničar. He was a player and a manager at the same time from 1945 to 1947. He appeared in 18 league matches for Željezničar, scoring 5 goals in the two seasons. In 1947, Rajlić was ordered by communist authorities to join newly founded Sarajevo, for which he played until 1949. In total, he turned out in 18 league matches and scored 11 goals for the club.

Not satisfied with being constantly moved around by authorities in Sarajevo, Rajlić relocated to Kraljevo that same year, coming back to Sloga Kraljevo. He played for Sloga until his early death in 1952.

== International career ==
On 22 September 1940, Rajlić made his first and only appearance for the Yugoslavia national team against Romania.

== Managerial career ==
In 1945, Rajlić decided to become a professional football manager while still playing. In the summer of 1945, he signed a contract with Željezničar, becoming the new player-manager of the club. He guided the club to the 1946 Bosnian Republic League title. In 1949, Rajlić continued his player-manager duties at Sloga Kraljevo after joining the club. He stayed at Sloga until his early death in 1952.

== Death and memorial ==
Rajlić died on 10 May 1952 at the age of 35 in Kraljevo, SFR Yugoslavia. Before the Yugoslav Wars which happened during the 1990s, Rajlić's former club Sloga Kraljevo used to organize an annual tournament named after him. Regular participants were Sloga, Sarajevo and Željezničar, all of them his former clubs.

== Career statistics ==
=== International ===
National team	Year	Apps	Goals
Yugoslavia
Yugoslavia	1940	1	0
Total		1	0

== Honours ==
=== Player ===
SK Jugoslavija

- Serbian League: 1941–42

Željezničar

- Bosnian Republic League: 1946

Sarajevo

- Yugoslav Second League: 1948–49

=== Manager ===
Željezničar

- Bosnian Republic League: 1946
