= Vlatko Konjevod =

Personal information
- Full name: Vladimir Konjevod
- Date of birth: 1923
- Place of birth: Sarajevo, Kingdom of Serbs, Croats and Slovenes
- Date of death: 4 December 2005 (aged 81–82)
- Place of death: Sarajevo, Bosnia and Herzegovina
- Position: Striker

Senior career*
Years	Team	Apps	(Gls)
1939–1945	SAŠK		
1945–1946	Osijek		
1946–1947	Željezničar		
1947–1954	Sarajevo		
1954	Travnik		
1955–1957	Slaven Živinice		
1957–1959	Modriča		

Managerial career
- 1954: Travnik
- 1955–1957: Slaven Živinice
- 1957–1959: Napredak Modriča
- 1959–1960: Čelik Zenica
- 1961–1964: Željezničar
- 1964–1965: Dinamo Zagreb
- 1966–1967: Beringen
- 1968–1969: Olimpija Ljubljana
- 1969–1970: Čelik Zenica
- * Club domestic league appearances and goals

Vladimir "Vlatko" Konjevod (1923– 4 December 2005) was a Yugoslav and later Bosnian professional football manager and player.

== Playing career ==
=== Club ===
He played for SAŠK, Osijek, Željezničar, Sarajevo, Travnik, Slaven Živinice and Napredak Modriča.

== Managerial career ==
Konjevod player-managed Travnik, Slaven Živinice and Modriča, after which he fully managed Čelik Zenica, Željezničar, Dinamo Zagreb, Beringen and Olimpija Ljubljana.

He won the 1948–49 Yugoslav Second League with Sarajevo as a player, while as a manager, Konjevod guided Željezničar to win the 1961–62 Yugoslav Second League (West Division) and Dinamo Zagreb to a 1964–65 Yugoslav Cup triumph.

== Honours ==
=== Player ===
Sarajevo

- Yugoslav Second League: 1948–49

=== Manager ===
Željezničar

- Yugoslav Second League: 1961–62 (West)

Dinamo Zagreb

- Yugoslav Cup: 1964–65
