= Hajrudin Saračević =

Bosnian footballer (1949–2022)

Personal information
- Date of birth: 26 March 1949
- Place of birth: Sarajevo, PR Bosnia and Herzegovina, FPR Yugoslavia
- Date of death: 16 September 2022 (aged 73)
- Place of death: United States
- Position: Defender

Youth career
- Željezničar

Senior career*
Years	Team	Apps	(Gls)
1967–1983	Željezničar	313	(27)
1970–1971	→ Borac Banja Luka (loan)		

Managerial career
- 1991–1992: Bačka 1901
- * Club domestic league appearances and goals

Hajrudin Saračević (26 March 1949 – 16 September 2022) was a Bosnian professional football player and manager.

== Career ==
Born in Sarajevo, SR Bosnia and Herzegovina, back then part of Yugoslavia, he played for FK Željezničar Sarajevo for almost all of his career. He made his debut in 1967–1968 season at the age of 18. He has made 313 league appearances for Željezničar and that is the club record. In total, he played 339 official matches for the club. He was a member of the team that won the Yugoslav championship title in 1972. Beside Željezničar, he also played for FK Borac Banja Luka. In 1982, he has decided to end his career. After that, he was working as a coach in FK Željezničar's youth team.

== Personal life and death ==
During the Bosnian War he moved with his family to Palić, Serbia. He worked there as a coach of a local team. He also coached FK Bačka 1901 in the 1991–92 season. After few years he moved to U.S..

Saračević lived in Detroit, Michigan. He died on 16 September 2022, at the age of 73.

== Honours ==
Željezničar

- Yugoslav First League: 1971–72
- Yugoslav Second League: 1977–78 (West)
