= Tehnika =

Croatian civil engineering company

Tehnika d.d.
- Type: Public
- Traded as: ZSE: THNK
- Industry: Civil engineering
- Founded: 1947
- Headquarters: Zagreb, Croatia
- Key people: Filip Filipec (CEO)
- Net income: HRK 11.7 million (2010) ▼ from HRK 11.9 million in 2009
- Total assets: HRK 1.302 billion (2010) ▼ from HRK 1.376 billion (2009)
- Number of employees: 1,281 (2010)
- Website: tehnika.hr

Tehnika d.d. is a Croatian company, active in civil engineering and construction industry. Its primary activities include building construction, infrastructure and civil engineering works, architectural and engineering services, technical consulting, professional supervision services and real estate management. It is listed on the Zagreb Stock Exchange and is one of 25 companies included in the CROBEX share index. In 2010, net income of the company was 11.7 million kuna, exhibiting a decrease from 11.9 million kuna net income reported for 2009. According to 2010 annual report, the company employs 1281 persons.

Tehnika was founded on January 1, 1947, and initially tasked with development of industrial complexes of former Yugoslavia. Subsequently, the scope of operations expanded to other types of construction work, both on the domestic market and abroad. In 2010 and 2011, the company suffered a substantial decrease of volume of works caused by shrinking economy.
