= Joško Domorocki =

Bosnian footballer (1917–1992)

Personal information
- Full name: Josip Domorocki
- Date of birth: 1917
- Place of birth: Sarajevo, Austria-Hungary
- Date of death: 1992 (aged 74–75)
- Place of death: Split, Croatia

Senior career*
Years	Team	Apps	(Gls)
1938–1940	Željezničar Sarajevo		
1940	Jugoslavija		
1940–194x	SAŠK Napredak		
1945	FK Udarnik		
1945–1946	Jedinstvo Sušak		
1946–1952	Željezničar Sarajevo		

Managerial career
- 1960-1961: Željezničar Sarajevo
- Rudar Breza
- * Club domestic league appearances and goals

Josip "Joško" Domorocki (1917–1992) was a Bosnian-Herzegovinian footballer. He was born in Sarajevo, where he lived for most of his life, and played for several clubs in the Yugoslav First League. He also trained and worked as a locksmith.

== Playing career ==
When Domorocki was 17, he began playing for FK Željezničar Sarajevo. Two years later, he went to Belgrade to serve in the army. While in Belgrade, he played for the SK Jugoslavija and the B squad of the Yugoslavia national team. In 1940, he returned to Sarajevo and played for SAŠK. When World War II ended in 1945, he played for FK Udarnik and later with Jedinstvo Sušak. He returned to Željezničar in 1946 and played with them until 1952.

He is particularly remembered for his defiance of the authorities over the creation of FK Sarajevo. When this team was created (as SD Torpedo) in 1946 by the merger of FK Udarnik and OFK Sloboda, several of the best players of FK Željezničar were ordered to play for the new club, representing Sarajevo and Bosnia-Herzegovina at the national level. Despite the tough attitude of the new communist government towards dissent, Domorocki refused (even after offering a flat and two new suits, which were a serious incentive at that time), and continued to play for Željezničar, where he stayed for six years as a player, and then worked subsequently.

== Managerial career ==
Domorocki later coached FK Rudar Breza.

== Death ==
Domorocki died in a car accident in Split in 1992.
