= Joško Farac =

Croatian former football defender

Personal information
- Date of birth: 13 August 1969 (age 57)
- Place of birth: Split, SR Croatia, SFR Yugoslavia
- Position: Defender

Senior career*
Years	Team	Apps	(Gls)
- Hajduk Split
1992–1993	Zadar	26	(1)
1993–1995	Primorac Stobreč	60	(4)
1996–1997	Mladost Suhopolje	20	(0)
- Zrinjski Mostar
- Perak
- * Club domestic league appearances and goals

Josko Farac (born 13 August 1969 in Split) is a Croatian former football defender. He formerly played with HNK Hajduk Split, NK Primorac, NK Zadar, NK Mladost 127, HŠK Zrinjski Mostar, Perak FA in Malaysia.

== External sources ==
- Interview from 2003 at Slobodna Dalmacija.
