= Ivica Osim =

Bosnian football manager (1941–2022)

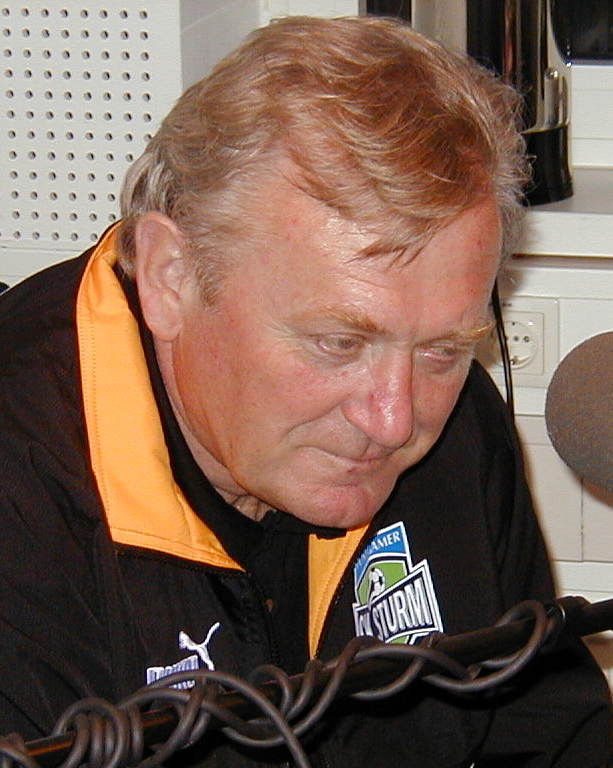
- Osim giving an interview in 1999

President of the Football Association of Bosnia and Herzegovina normalization committee
- In office 18 April 2011 – 13 December 2012
- Preceded by: See list: Sulejman Čolaković Bogdan Čeko Iljo Dominković (as members of the Presidency)
- Succeeded by: Elvedin Begić (as sole President)

Personal details
- Born: Ivan Osim; 6 May 1941 Sarajevo, Independent State of Croatia (modern-day Bosnia and Herzegovina)
- Died: 1 May 2022 (aged 80) Graz, Austria
- Resting place: Bare Cemetery, Sarajevo
- Height: 1.89 m (6 ft 2 in)
- Spouse: Asima Osim (m. 1965)
- Children: 3, including Amar
- Parents: Karolina Osim (mother); Mihail Osim (father)
Association football career
- Position: Midfielder
Youth career
- 1954–1959: Željezničar
Senior career*
Years	Team	Apps	(Gls)
1959–1968	Željezničar	166	(56)
1968	Zwolsche Boys	2	(0)
1969–1970	Željezničar	54	(9)
1970–1972	Strasbourg	58	(16)
1972–1975	Sedan	105	(16)
1975–1976	Valenciennes	30	(1)
1976–1978	Strasbourg	32	(4)
Total		447	(102)
International career
1964–1969	Yugoslavia	16	(8)
Managerial career
- 1978–1986: Željezničar
- 1986–1992: Yugoslavia
- 1991–1992: Partizan
- 1992–1994: Panathinaikos
- 1994–2002: Sturm Graz
- 2003–2006: JEF United Chiba
- 2006–2007: Japan
Medal record
Men's Football
Representing Yugoslavia
European Championship
Silver medal – second place	1968 Italy	Team
- * Club domestic league appearances and goals

Ivan Osim (6 May 1941 – 1 May 2022), best known as Ivica Osim, was a Bosnian professional footballer and football manager. Widely regarded as one of the greatest Bosnian football managers of all time, he is also seen as one of the most influential football managers in the former Yugoslavia.

As a player, Osim was in the Yugoslavia national team and played at the 1964 Summer Olympics. He also represented Yugoslavia at UEFA Euro 1968, where he won a silver medal and was voted into the Team of the Tournament. As a manager, Osim won a bronze medal with Yugoslavia at the 1984 Summer Olympics as an assistant, and reached the quarter-finals of the 1990 FIFA World Cup as head coach of the Yugoslavia national team. He also reached the 1984–85 UEFA Cup semi-finals as manager of his hometown club Željezničar.

Osim was head coach of the Japan national team, before suffering a stroke in November 2007 and subsequently leaving the post. In April 2011, FIFA announced that he had become president of the interim committee to run the Football Association of Bosnia and Herzegovina after the country was suspended from all international competitions. He served until December 2012.

Osim died in May 2022, after years of health issues following his stroke.

== Life and family ==
Osim was born during World War II in Sarajevo, precisely one month after the Nazi German invasion of Yugoslavia, to Slovene-German father Mihail "Puba" Osim, who worked as a machinist at the railways, and Polish-Czech mother Karolina. Both of his parents were also born in Sarajevo. Following the end of the war, he started playing football in the Željezničar youth system. He studied mathematics at the University of Sarajevo.

Osim was married to Asima and they had three children, two sons, Selmir and Amar, and daughter Irma. His son Amar was a football player himself, who afterward also became a successful football manager. Since 1994, Osim had lived with his wife mostly in Graz, Austria. Discontinuities only occurred when he lived in Japan during his managerial career there and when he visited Sarajevo in his function as advisor for the Football Association of Bosnia and Herzegovina.

== Club career ==
Osim began his professional career with hometown club Željezničar in 1959. He is considered one of the best Bosnians to step on a football pitch and was known as a ruthless dribbler. Osim stayed in Yugoslavia until the end of 1968, as transfers abroad were prohibited for players under 28 at the time. In December 1968, he went to the Netherlands, to play for Zwolsche Boys. This stay lasted only three months, due to a knee injury. In 1970, Osim signed with Strasbourg and played the rest of his career in France, playing also for Valenciennes, Sedan and again at Strasbourg.

== International career ==
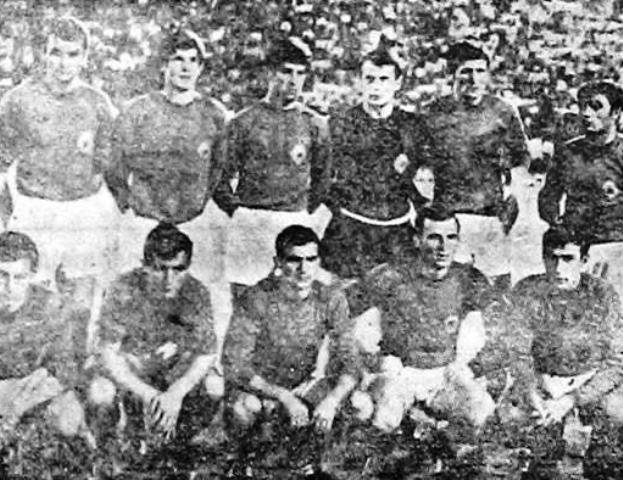
Osim (upper row, second from right) with Yugoslavia at UEFA Euro 1968

Osim made his debut for Yugoslavia in an October 1964 Olympic Games match against Morocco, and has earned a total of 16 caps, scoring eight goals. He also played at UEFA Euro 1968 where Yugoslavia reached the final, losing to Italy.

Osim's final international game was an April 1969 World Cup qualification match away against Spain.

== Managerial career ==
=== Željezničar ===
When his playing career ended in 1978, Osim took the managing job at the club where he began playing, Željezničar. He managed the club until 1986, and finished third in the Yugoslav championship once, reached the Yugoslav Cup final once and the UEFA Cup semi-finals once.

=== Yugoslavia ===
Osim assisted Ivan Toplak, head coach of the Yugoslav Olympic team, at the 1984 Summer Olympics where Yugoslavia won the bronze medal.

In 1986, he took over the Yugoslavia national team. The first qualifying cycle for UEFA Euro 1988 ended in failure with an embarrassing 1–4 home loss against England. Contrary to expectations and custom considering the fate of Yugoslav head coaches who presided over prior failed qualifying campaigns, Osim was not fired by the Yugoslav FA largely thanks to personal authority of FA president Miljan Miljanić who wanted Osim to be given another chance.

Osim's Yugoslavia rebounded in the 1990 FIFA World Cup qualification, finishing ahead of France and Scotland. At the 1990 FIFA World Cup, Yugoslavia reached the quarter-finals by eliminating Spain 2–1 in the round of 16, and proceeded to face Diego Maradona's Argentina in the quarter-finals. Despite losing a defender, Refik Šabanadžović, to a red card at the half an hour mark, Osim's team held on through the entire game and extra time, only to lose on penalties.

Yugoslavia qualified for UEFA Euro 1992, but Osim resigned on 23 May 1992; as his family in Sarajevo faced bombardment during the Bosnian War. "My country doesn't deserve to play in the European Championship," said Osim, "On the scale of human suffering, I cannot reconcile events at home with my position as national manager." Yugoslavia was banned from the event, and its newly independent states have since competed as separate nations. Osim's home national team, Bosnia and Herzegovina, had to wait further 23 years to qualify for their first major football competition, having done so for the 2014 FIFA World Cup held in Brazil.

=== Partizan ===
Osim became the new manager of Partizan in the summer of 1991, in parallel with coaching the Yugoslavia national team. He won the 1991–92 Yugoslav Cup with Partizan, having eliminated his old club Željezničar during the semi-finals of the competition.

=== Panathinaikos ===
After leaving Yugoslavia, Osim managed Greek Alpha Ethniki club Panathinaikos from 1992 to 1994, winning the Greek Cup and Super Cup in 1993, as well as finishing second in the league in 1993.

=== Sturm Graz ===
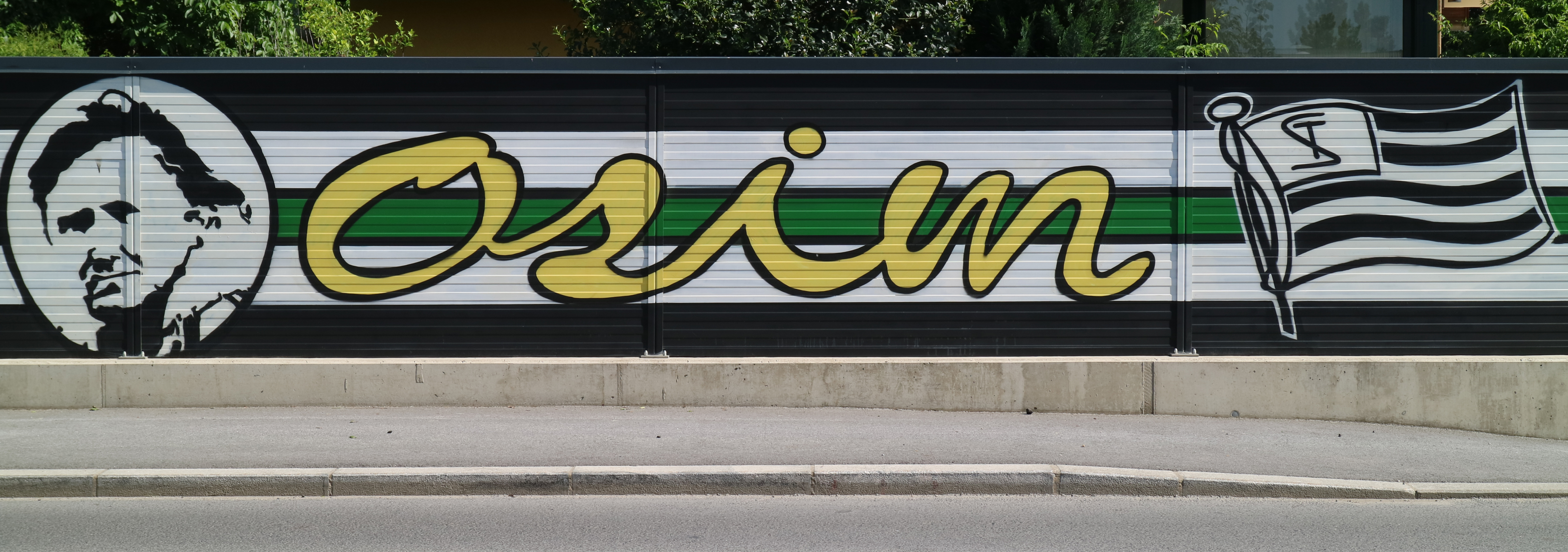
In 2022, following his death, a mural depicting Osim was painted on a street in the Graz district of Puntigam

In 1994, Heinz Schilcher, whom Osim had played with in Strasbourg, convinced him to manage Austrian club Sturm Graz. Osim led the Blackies to win the Austrian Bundesliga in 1998 and 1999, the Austrian Cup in 1996, 1997 and 1999 and the Austrian Supercup in 1996, 1998 and 1999.

The club also appeared in the UEFA Champions League from 1998 to 2001 under Osim's guidance. Until 2022, Sturm was the only Austrian club to qualify from their group stage and play amongst the last 16 of the Champions League. Red Bull Salzburg repeated that achievement in the 2021–22 season, more than two decades after the Sturm team led by Osim.

=== JEF United Chiba ===
From 2003 to 2006, Osim was manager of JEF United Chiba of the J1 League and built a contender despite the club's modest means. The club came closest to its first league title in 2003, when it finished third in the season's first stage and second in the second stage. In 2005, JEF United won its first major title with Osim as manager, the J.League Cup.

=== Japan ===
On 21 July 2006, Osim was appointed head coach of the Japan national team, replacing Brazilian manager and former player Zico, who had resigned after the end of the 2006 FIFA World Cup. Japan defeated Trinidad and Tobago 2–0 in Osim's debut as head coach on 9 August 2006.

At the 2007 AFC Asian Cup, he failed to lead Japan to its third successive title, losing to Saudi Arabia in the semi-finals and to South Korea in the third place play-off on penalties. Osim said, "I feel like I've dropped my trousers. Twice," in describing his own managerial performance, pointing out that he did not rest the tired players. During the tournament, Osim reduced his interpreter to tears during a dressing room tirade, in which he called his players "amateurs" following a 1–1 draw against Qatar, and refused to watch the penalty shoot-out against Australia in the quarter-finals, saying "I didn't see it because it was bad for my heart. I don't want to die while I coach Japan's national team. I want to die in my hometown, Sarajevo."

Osim's remarks gained popularity with Japanese fans, and Words of Osim (オシムの言葉, Oshimu no kotoba) (ISBN 4797671084), a collection of his quotes published in 2005, sold 400,000 copies and was on the bestseller list in Japan.

== Administrative work ==
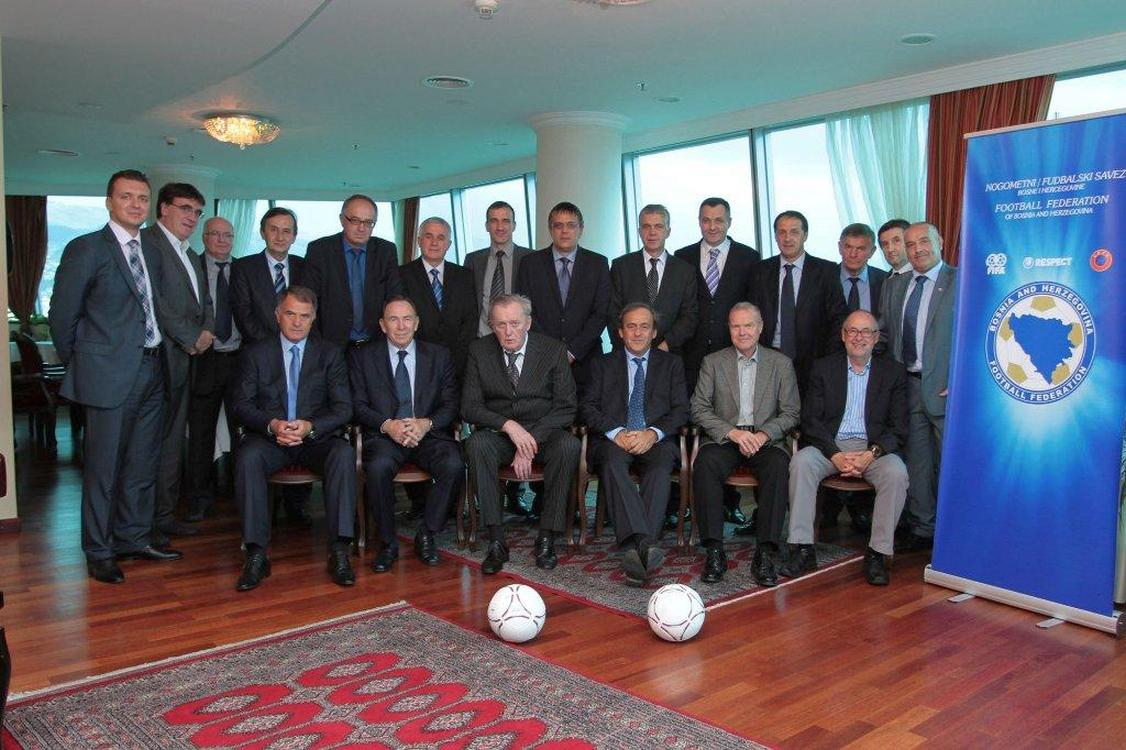
Osim alongside Dušan Bajević, Faruk Hadžibegić, Ivan Ćurković and Michel Platini among others, during his administrative work for the Bosnian Football Association in 2012

On 18 April 2011, FIFA announced that Osim would head an interim committee to run the Football Association of Bosnia and Herzegovina after the country was suspended for two months from all international competitions by FIFA. He served as head of the committee until 13 December 2012.

== Health issues and death ==
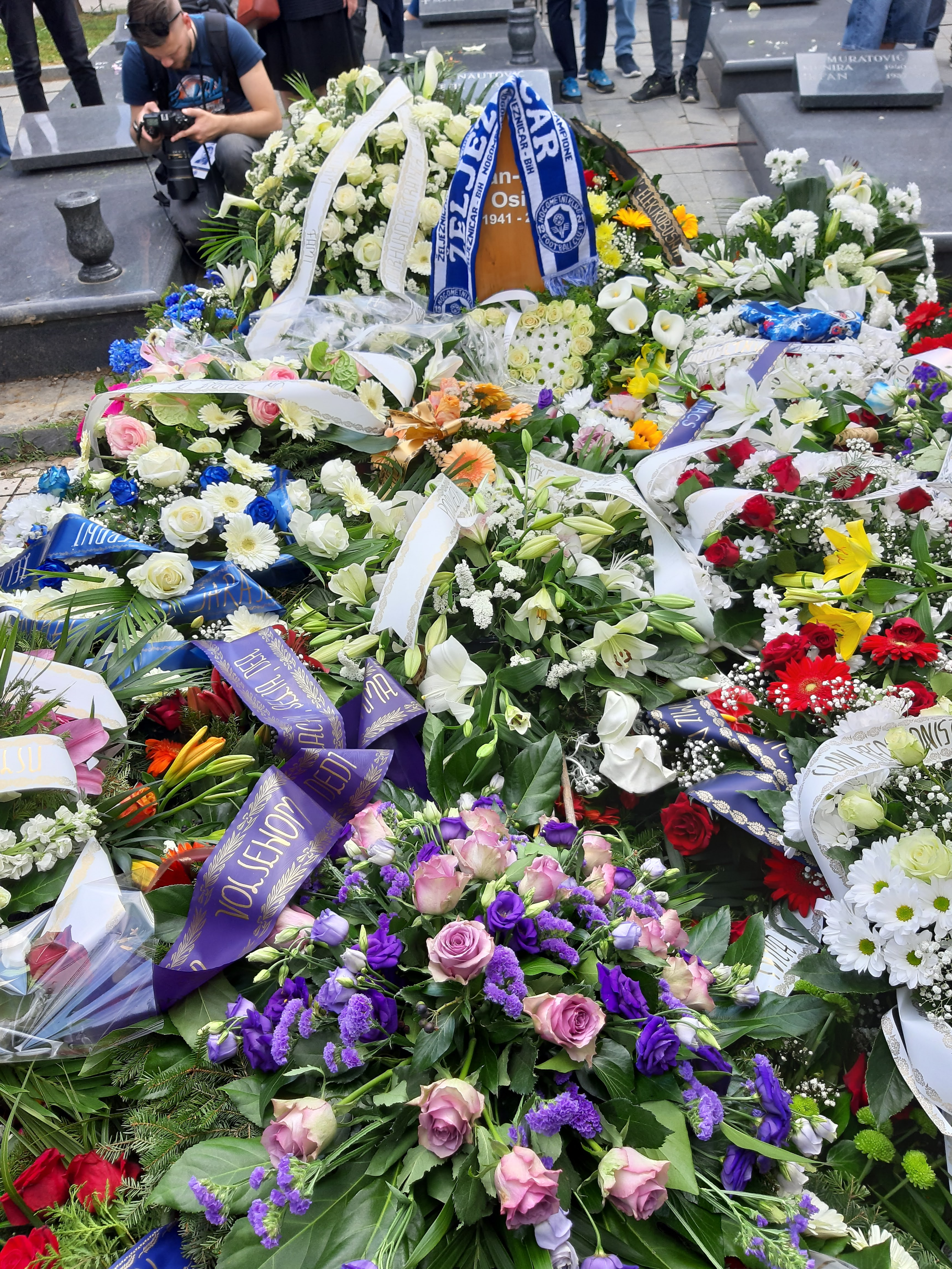
Osim's grave covered in flowers on the day of his funeral, 14 May 2022

On 16 November 2007, Osim suffered a stroke at his residence in Chiba, Japan while watching a friendly match between Austria and England on television. He was in a coma for almost three weeks during which time he was visited by notable people of world football like Michel Platini and Sepp Blatter among others. Eventually, Osim regained consciousness on 3 December 2007 and asked his wife, Asima, "What's the score?" of the game he was watching at the critical moment when he suffered the stroke. He was then moved from an intensive care unit to a general ward at the Juntendo University hospital in Urayasu, Chiba on 23 December.

On 7 December 2007, the Japan FA formally announced the appointment of Takeshi Okada, who coached Japan during the 1998 FIFA World Cup, to replace Osim as Japan head coach.

On 1 May 2022, Osim died at his home in Graz, Austria, five days short of his 81st birthday, after years of health issues following his stroke. After the news of his death, leading regional figures from the world of football and politics paid tribute to him. Croatian football manager and former player Velimir Zajec said "Švabo has also left. The days in Panathinaikos are not forgotten. A great coach." Serbia national team head coach Dragan Stojković called Osim an "intelligent man, a football strategist who had great intuition, who was one of the most important football names in the former Yugoslavia and will be remembered that way." Bosnian Presidency chairman Šefik Džaferović said that everyone will remember Osim as a "top footballer and football manager, but also a great man and patriot, with unique charisma and first-class moral qualities."

On 4 May, the coffin with Osim's body was laid out in the middle of the Merkur Arena, Sturm Graz's home ground, and thousands of fans were present when the stadium was floodlit for 81 minutes in honour of Osim. He was buried in Sarajevo at the Bare Cemetery on 14 May 2022. Thousands of people attended Osim's funeral and it was also broadcast live on national television. He was survived by his wife Asima, their daughter Irma and their two sons, Selmir and Amar.

In May 2023, the city of Graz renamed the forecourt of the Merkur Arena to Ivica-Osim-Platz ('Ivica-Osim-Square'). That same month, the street Zvornička 21 in Sarajevo, where Željezničar's home ground Grbavica stadium is located, was renamed to Ivica Osim Boulevard.

== Managerial statistics ==
Managerial record by team and tenure
Team	From	To	Record				
Team	From	To	G	W	D	L	Win %
Željezničar	1 June 1978	1 May 1986	301	118	81	102	39.20
Yugoslavia	29 October 1986	25 March 1992	51	27	10	14	52.94
Partizan	1 July 1991	30 June 1992	42	29	5	8	69.05
Panathinaikos	1 July 1992	13 March 1994	72	48	11	13	66.67
Sturm Graz	1 June 1994	14 September 2002	383	207	81	95	54.05
JEF United Chiba	23 January 2003	19 July 2006	142	69	40	33	48.59
Japan	20 July 2006	29 November 2007	20	13	2	5	65.00
Career Total			1,011	511	230	270	50.54

== Honours ==
=== Player ===
Željezničar

- Yugoslav Second League: 1961–62 (West)

Strasbourg

- French Division 2: 1976–77

Yugoslavia

- UEFA European Championship runner-up: 1968

Individual

- UEFA Euro Team of the Tournament: 1968

=== Manager ===
Partizan

- Yugoslav Cup: 1991–92

Panathinaikos

- Greek Cup: 1992–93
- Greek Super Cup: 1993

Sturm Graz

- Austrian Bundesliga: 1997–98, 1998–99
- Austrian Cup: 1995–96, 1996–97, 1998–99
- Austrian Supercup: 1996, 1998, 1999

JEF United Chiba

- J.League Cup: 2005

Japan

- Afro-Asian Cup of Nations: 2007

== Awards and orders ==
=== Awards ===
- Osim received the Sixth of April Sarajevo Award in 1990.
- Osim was posthumously inducted into the Japan Football Hall of Fame in 2022.

=== Orders ===
- Order of the Rising Sun, 4th Class, Gold Rays with Rosette: 2016

== See also ==
- List of football managers with the most matches
- List of FK Željezničar Sarajevo managers
- List of FK Željezničar Sarajevo players
