= Mišo Smajlović =

Bosnian football manager (born 1938)

Personal information
- Full name: Drago Smajlović
- Date of birth: 28 October 1938 (age 88)
- Place of birth: Sarajevo, Kingdom of Yugoslavia
- Position: Striker

Youth career
- 1955–1956: Sloga Sarajevo
- 1956–1958: Željezničar

Senior career*
Years	Team	Apps	(Gls)
1958–1967	Željezničar	166	(88)
1967–1968	Standard Liège	21	(5)
1968–1969	Olimpija Ljubljana	14	(4)
1969–1971	Čelik Zenica	19	(3)
Total		220	(100)

International career
1963–1964	Yugoslavia	4	(1)

Managerial career
- 1988: Toronto Croatia
- 1988–1989: Željezničar (caretaker)
- 1989–1991: Željezničar
- 1994–1997: Željezničar
- 1998: Bosnia and Herzegovina U21
- 2000–2002: Bosnia and Herzegovina
- * Club domestic league appearances and goals

Drago "Mišo" Smajlović (Bosnian pronunciation: [drǎːɡo mǐːʃo smǎjloʋitɕ]; born 28 October 1938) is a Bosnian retired professional football manager and former player.

== Club career ==
Smajlović began his career in Sloga, a small amateur club from Sarajevo. In 1955 he moved to the youth team of Željezničar. Two years later, Smajlović signed a professional contract with Željezničar for whom he played more than 400 games and scored 241 goals. He was handed his debut by Miroslav Brozović. If considering only official matches, he played 190 games and scored 97 goals (with 88 goals in 166 league matches). Smajlović was the top goalscorer of the 1962–63 Yugoslav First League season with 18 goals.

In 1967, he went abroad to Belgium to play at Standard Liège. After a season and a half in Belgium, Smajlović returned to Yugoslavia and continued playing for Olimpija Ljubljana and Čelik Zenica after which he ended his professional playing career.

== International career ==
Smajlović was one of the best strikers in Yugoslavia at the time. He played for youth national teams and the "B team", before making his debut for the senior Yugoslavia national team in 1963. He collected four caps for Yugoslavia, scoring one goal. His final international was an April 1964 friendly match against Bulgaria.

Journalists often called Smajlović a gentleman in football shoes. The fact that Smajlović did not play for one of the bigger Yugoslav clubs limited his chances of being a regular choice in the national team.

== Managerial career ==
After his playing days were over, Smajlović dedicated himself to a managerial career. In 1988, he was invited to Canada and soon after was named manager of Toronto Croatia in the National Soccer League. Smajlović was the manager of his former club Željezničar on several occasions. He also worked as a sporting director in the club. It is important to say that he was among the responsible ones for saving Željezničar going bankrupt during the Bosnian War.

In 1997, he was elected to be a head coach of the Bosnia and Herzegovina U21 national team. After Faruk Hadžibegić stepped down as senior Bosnia and Herzegovina national team head coach in October 1999, Smajlović was first appointed as a caretaker head coach and several months later, in 2000, he was definitely elected as head coach of the Bosnia and Herzegovina national team. After the end of his contract in 2002, Smajlović never renewed it.

He ultimately decided to end his managerial career after leaving the national team.

== Honours ==
=== Player ===
Željezničar

- Yugoslav Second League (West): 1961–62

Čelik Zenica

- Mitropa Cup: 1971–72

Individual

- Yugoslav First League top scorer: 1962–63
