= Bosnia and Herzegovina Republic League =

Bosnia and Herzegovina Republic League (Bosnian: Republička liga BiH) was the football league in the Yugoslav federation's SR Bosnia and Herzegovina constituent unit within the Yugoslav football system. Throughout most of its existence, it was the third-tier league and its winner was usually promoted to the Yugoslav Second League.

== Winners ==
In SFR Yugoslavia

Season	Champions	Notes - Clubs playing on higher level
1946	Željezničar	
1946–47	Velež Mostar	Željezničar (I)
1947–48	Velež Mostar	Sarajevo (I), Željezničar (II)
1948–49	Željezničar	Sarajevo (II)
1950	Bosna Sarajevo	Sarajevo (I), Željezničar (II), Velež, Borac (III)
1951	Borac Banja Luka	Sarajevo (I), Velež, Željezničar (II)
1952	Velež Mostar	Sarajevo (I)
1952–53	Borac Banja Luka	Sarajevo, Velež (I)
1953–54	Zenica	Sarajevo (I), Željezničar, Velež, Borac (II)
1954–55	Sloboda Tuzla	Sarajevo, Željezničar (I), Velež, Zenica (II)
1955–73	Not played (zonal system)	
1973–74	Jedinstvo Bihać	Velež, Čelik, Željezničar, Sloboda, Sarajevo, Borac (I), Kozara, Iskra, Igman, Famos, Leotar (II)
1974–75	Jedinstvo Brčko	Velež, Sloboda, Željezničar, Čelik, Sarajevo (I), Borac, Leotar, Iskra, Famos, Igman, J Bihać, Kozara (II)
1975–76	Rudar Ljubija	Sloboda, Sarajevo, Velež, Borac, Željezničar, Čelik (I), Leotar, J Bihać, Famos, J Brčko, Iskra, Igman (II)
1976–77	Radnik Bijeljina	Sloboda, Borac, Velež, Čelik, Sarajevo, Željezničar (I), J Bihać, Leotar, Famos, J Brčko, Iskra, Rudar (II)
1977–78	Bosna Visoko	Sloboda, Velež, Sarajevo, Borac, Čelik (I), Željezničar, Iskra, Rudar, Famos, Leotar, Radnik, J Bihać, J Brčko (II)
1978–79	Jedinstvo Bihać	Sarajevo, Velež, Sloboda, Željezničar, Borac (I), Čelik, Bosna, Iskra, Famos, Leotar, Radnik, Rudar (II)
1979–80	Jedinstvo Brčko	Sarajevo, Sloboda, Velež, Željezničar, Borac, Čelik (I), Iskra, Leotar, J Bihać, Bosna, Famos (II)
1980–81	Kozara Gradiška	Sloboda, Velež, Sarajevo, Željezničar, Borac (I), Iskra, Čelik, J Brčko, Leotar, J Bihać, Bosna (II)
1981–82	Radnik Bijeljina	Sarajevo, Željezničar, Velež, Sloboda (I), Čelik, Iskra, Borac, Leotar, J Bihać, Kozara, J Brčko (II)
1982–83	Sloga Doboj	Sloboda, Željezničar, Sarajevo, Velež (I), Čelik, Iskra, J Brčko, leotar, Borac, J Bihać, Radnik, Kozara (II)
1983–84	Rudar Ljubija	Željezničar, Sarajevo, Velež, Sloboda, Čelik (I), Iskra, Leotar, J Brčko, J Bihać, Borac, Radnik, Sloga (II)
1984–85	Famos Hrasnica	Sarajevo, Željezničar, Velež, Sloboda, Iskra (I), Čelik, J Brčko, J Bihać, Borac, Leotar, Rudar, Radnik (II)
1985–86	Sloga Doboj	Velež, Željezničar, Sloboda, Sarajevo, Čelik (I), Iskra, Leotar, J Brčko, Rudar, Borac, Famos, J Bihać (II)
1986–87	Borac Travnik	Velež, Željezničar, Čelik, Sarajevo, Sloboda (I), Leotar, Borac, J Brčko, Iskra, Rudar, Famos, Sloga (II)
1987–88	Radnik Bijeljina	Velež, Sloboda, Željezničar, Sarajevo, Čelik (I), Leotar, Borac, Iskra, Rudar, Famos, J Brčko, Travnik (II)

=== Performance by club ===
Club	Titles	Years won
Radnik Bijeljina	3	1976, 1982, 1988
Velež Mostar	3	1947, 1948, 1952
Borac Banja Luka	2	1951, 1953
Jedinstvo Bihać	2	1974, 1979
Jedinstvo Brčko	2	1975, 1980
Rudar Ljubija	2	1976, 1984
Sloga Doboj	2	1983, 1986
Željezničar	2	1946, 1949
Bosna Sarajevo	1	1950
Bosna Visoko	1	1978
Borac Travnik	1	1987
Famos Hrasnica	1	1985
Kozara Gradiška	1	1981
Sloboda Tuzla	1	1955
Zenica	1	1954
