= 1948–49 Yugoslav Second League =

Yugoslav Second League
- Season: 1948–49
- Champions: Sarajevo
- Promoted: Sarajevo; Spartak Subotica
- Relegated: Dinamo Pančevo; Dinamo Skopje

The 1948–49 Yugoslav Second League season was the 3rd season of the Second Federal League (Serbo-Croatian: Druga savezna liga), the second level association football competition of SFR Yugoslavia, since its establishment in 1946.

== Teams ==
A total of ten teams contested the league, including four sides from the 1947–48 season, three clubs relegated from the 1947–48 Yugoslav First League and three sides promoted from the third-tier leagues played in the 1947–48 season. The league was contested in a double round robin format, with each club playing every other club twice, for a total of 18 rounds. Two points were awarded for a win and one point for draws.

Sarajevo and Spartak Subotica were relegated from the 1947–48 Yugoslav First League after finishing in the bottom two places of the league table, while Vardar lost to Naša Krila Zemun in the relegation play-offs. The three clubs promoted to the second level were Dinamo Skopje, Podrinje Šabac and Proleter Osijek.

Locations of teams' home cities in the 1948–49 Yugoslav Second League

Team	Location	Federal subject	Position in 1947–48
Dinamo Pančevo	Pančevo	(Socialist Republic of Serbia) SAP Vojvodina	6th
Dinamo Skopje	Skopje	SR Macedonia	—N/a
Metalac Zagreb	Zagreb	SR Croatia	4th
Mornar Split	Split	SR Croatia	5th
Odred Ljubljana	Ljubljana	SR Slovenia	7th
Podrinje Šabac	Šabac	SR Serbia	—N/a
Proleter Osijek	Osijek	SR Croatia	—N/a
Sarajevo	Sarajevo	SR Bosnia and Herzegovina	—N/a
Spartak Subotica	Subotica	(Socialist Republic of Serbia) SAP Vojvodina	—N/a
Vardar	Skopje	SR Macedonia	—N/a

== League table ==
Pos	Team	Pld	W	D	L	GF	GA	GR	Pts	Promotion or relegation
1	Sarajevo (C, P)	18	11	5	2	27	14	1.929	27	Promotion to Yugoslav First League (Note: Mornar Split were disbanded by the authorities at the end of the season so Spartak Subotica were promoted instead.)
2	Mornar Split	18	10	2	6	43	17	2.529	22	Promotion to Yugoslav First League
3	Spartak Subotica (P)	18	6	7	5	33	27	1.222	19	
4	Metalac Zagreb	18	8	3	7	25	24	1.042	19	
5	Podrinje Šabac	18	6	5	7	21	25	0.840	17	
6	Odred	18	7	3	8	19	23	0.826	17	
7	Vardar	18	6	5	7	28	34	0.824	17	
8	Proleter Osijek	18	8	1	9	22	29	0.759	17	
9	Dinamo Pančevo (R)	18	5	4	9	25	34	0.735	14	Relegation to Third Level
10	Dinamo Skopje (R)	18	3	5	10	17	33	0.515	11	Relegation to Third Level

Source: rsssf.org
Rules for classification: 1st points; 2nd goal average.
(C) Champions; (P) Promoted; (R) Relegated

== See also ==
- 1948–49 Yugoslav First League
- 1948–49 Yugoslav Cup
