= Dino Đurbuzović =

Bosnian football manager (born 1956)

Personal information
- Full name: Hajrudin Đurbuzović
- Date of birth: 14 August 1956 (age 70)
- Place of birth: Sarajevo, FPR Yugoslavia
- Height: 1.86 m (6 ft 1 in)
- Position: Midfielder

Youth career
- 1964–1975: Željezničar

Senior career*
Years	Team	Apps	(Gls)
1975–1981	Željezničar	0	(0)
1981	→ Iskra Bugojno (loan)	17	(5)
1982	Iskra Bugojno	14	(3)
1982–1985	Čelik Zenica	18	(5)
1985–1987	Kayserispor	44	(6)
1987–1989	Gençlerbirliği	50	(8)
1989–1990	Ankaragücü	32	(5)
Total		175	(32)

Managerial career
- 1995–1996: Bosnia and Herzegovina U17
- 1997: Željezničar
- 2000–2001: Željezničar
- 2001–2003: Čelik Zenica
- 2003: Travnik
- 2004–2005: Čelik Zenica
- 2013–2014: Željezničar
- 2014–2015: Al-Muharraq
- 2017–2018: Olimpik
- 2024: Željezničar (caretaker)
- * Club domestic league appearances and goals

Hajrudin "Dino" Đurbuzović (born 14 August 1956) is a Bosnian professional football manager and former player.

== Playing career ==
Born in Sarajevo, SFR Yugoslavia, present day Bosnia and Herzegovina on 14 August 1956, Đurbuzović started playing football in his hometown club Željezničar. He was first playing in the youth team, but then signed a professional contract with the club, however he never played a single official game for the first team.

Đurbuzović was loaned-out to Iskra Bugojno and that proved to be a good decision as he was later transferred to this second division club. He was a talented striker and after several seasons in Iskra, he signed a contract with Čelik Zenica, and would make 18 appearances for the club in the Yugoslav First League.

In 1985, Đurbuzović went to Turkey where he played for Kayserispor, Gençlerbirliği and Ankaragücü. He ended his playing career in 1990 after leaving Ankaragücü.

== Managerial career ==
Đurbuzović continued to play a significant role in Bosnian football as a manager. He firstly worked as the Bosnia and Herzegovina U17 national team head coach from 1995 until 1996. He then worked as the manager of Željezničar, with whom, in his second appointment, won the Bosnian Supercup in 2000. During 1999, he held the position of the senior Bosnia and Herzegovina national team assistant coach.

Đurbuzović also worked as a manager at Čelik Zenica and Travnik. As an assistant manager, he worked at Gaziantepspor and Denizlispor. He came back to Željezničar and was appointed as assistant manager in June 2009, after which he got promoted to a manager in 2013. He left the post at the end of the 2013–14 season after finishing fourth in the Bosnian Premier League.

During the 2014–15 season, Đurbuzović led Al-Muharraq to the Bahraini Premier League title. In November 2017, it was announced that he was assuming the position of manager of Olimpik. Đurbuzović parted ways with Olimpik on 2 April 2018.

On 20 April 2024, Đurbuzović returned to Željezničar, getting appointed as the club's caretaker manager amidst an unexpected relegation battle. He was victorious in his first game back, beating Široki Brijeg 1–0 at home on 23 April. Following two more league wins over GOŠK Gabela and Tuzla City, Željezničar managed to avoid relegation with three games remaining. Đurbuzović finished the season with the club in sixth place, winning five and drawing one of their six remaining league games. On 12 June 2024, he was replaced as manager by Denis Ćorić on a permanent basis.

In January 2026, Đurbuzović became an assistant to newly appointed Željezničar manager Slaviša Stojanović. Đurbuzović left the post in March, two months later, following Stojanović's dismissal.

== Honours ==
=== Manager ===
Željezničar

- Bosnian Supercup: 2000

Al-Muharraq

- Bahraini Premier League: 2014–15
