= Milan Ribar =

Bosnian football manager (1930–1996)

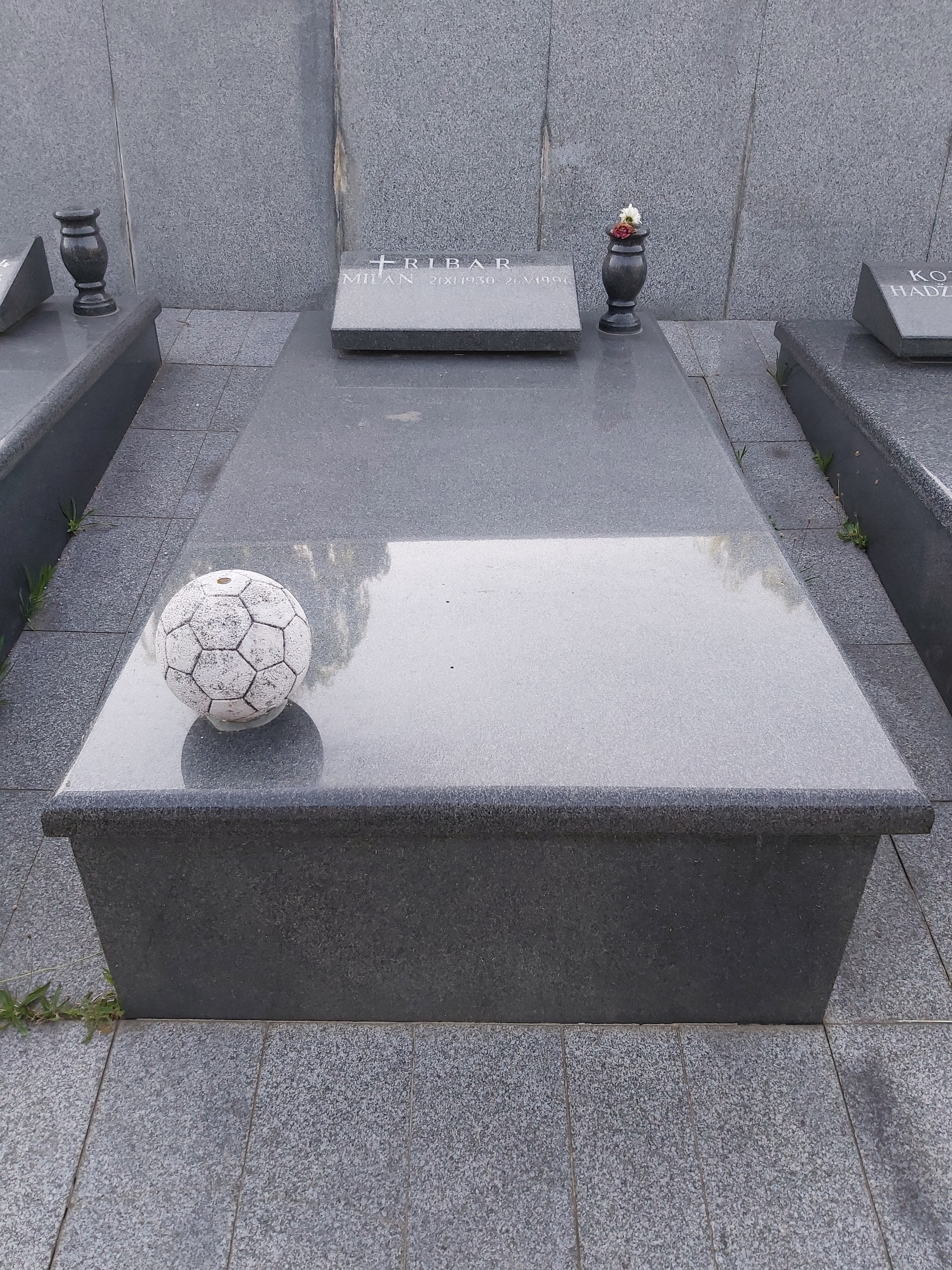
- Ribar's grave at the Bare Cemetery in Sarajevo

Personal information
- Date of birth: 21 November 1930
- Place of birth: Sarajevo, Kingdom of Yugoslavia
- Date of death: 26 May 1996 (aged 65)
- Place of death: Zagreb, Croatia
- Position: Defender

Youth career
- –1950: Željezničar

Senior career*
Years	Team	Apps	(Gls)
1950–1953	Željezničar	24	(0)
1953–1956	Borac Banja Luka		
1956–1960	Željezničar	41	(2)

Managerial career
- 1967–1976: Željezničar
- 1973–1974: Yugoslavia (co-manager)
- 1976–1977: Iraklis
- 1978–1979: AEL
- 1981–1984: Čelik Zenica
- 1984–1985: Spartak Subotica
- 1987–1988: Šibenik
- 1988–1989: Sarıyer
- 1989: Zeytinburnuspor
- 1991–1992: Željezničar
- * Club domestic league appearances and goals

Milan Ribar (21 November 1930 – 26 May 1996) was a Bosnian professional football manager and player.

He is the only manager in Željezničar history to have won the Yugoslav First League.

== Playing career ==
Ribar played for hometown club Željezničar on two occasions (1950–1953 and 1956–1960) and Borac Banja Luka (1953–1956). For Željezničar he made 65 league appearances and scored 2 goals. Ribar was known for being a very rough player.

== Managerial career ==
Ribar managed Željezničar, Yugoslavia (co-manager), Iraklis, AEL, Čelik Zenica, Sarıyer and Zeytinburnuspor.

Ribar led Željezničar to the Yugoslav First League title in the 1971–72 season. With 367 games, he has the most managerial appearances for Željezničar.

== Honours ==
=== Player ===
Željezničar

- Yugoslav Second League: 1956–57 (zone II A)

=== Manager ===
Željezničar

- Yugoslav First League: 1971–72
