= FK Željezničar Sarajevo =

Association football club in Bosnia and Herzegovina

Željezničar
- Full name: Fudbalski klub Željezničar Sarajevo
- Nickname: Plavi (The Blues)
- Short name: Željo
- Founded: 19 September 1921; 105 years ago
- Ground: Grbavica Stadium
- Capacity: 13,057
- Chairman: Jusuf Tanović
- Manager: Vacant
- League: Premier League BH
- 2025–26: Premier League BH, 6th of 10
- Website: fkzeljeznicar.ba
Home colours	Away colours	Third colours

Fudbalski klub Željezničar Sarajevo (English: Football Club Željezničar Sarajevo), commonly referred to as Željo, is a professional football club, based in Sarajevo, Bosnia and Herzegovina. The name Željezničar means "railway worker", originating from their establishment by a group of railway workers in 1921. Throughout its history, the club has cultivated a reputation for producing talented home-grown players through its youth school.

During the days of socialist Yugoslavia, FK Željezničar were national champions in the 1971–72 season, qualifying for the European Cup during the 1972–73 season. The club has also finished as runners-up once in the league, and contested the 1980–81 Yugoslav Cup final. In Europe, the club reached the UEFA Cup quarter-finals during the 1971–72 season and the semi-finals during the 1984–85 season. The latter remains the most successful European campaign by any club from Bosnia and Herzegovina.

Alongside FK Sarajevo, Željezničar is the most successful football team from Bosnia and Herzegovina, having won six Bosnian championships, six Bosnian Cups and three Bosnian Supercups, in addition to the Yugoslav First League title in 1972. The club's so far best post-war European result was qualifying to the 2002–03 Champions League third qualifying round, losing to Newcastle United. Their biggest rival is FK Sarajevo with whom they contest the biggest football match in Bosnia and Herzegovina, the Sarajevo derby.

== History ==
=== Pre-independence (1921–1992) ===
Željezničar was formed by a group of railway workers. During the early 20th century, there were several football clubs in Sarajevo. They were rich and usually backed by various organizations, most of them on an ethnic basis: Bosnian Muslims, Bosnian Serbs, Bosnian Croats, Bosnian Jews, unlike Željezničar. Since it was a financially poor club, they used to organize dance nights and all the profits made were later used to buy shoes and balls.

Financial problems were not the only ones. The club's embrace of members of all ethnic backgrounds was seen as a threat by many at the time, so Željezničar was suppressed in various ways. Despite that, the club managed to survive, and even beat wealthier clubs. The first official match, a friendly, was played at Kovačići, a Sarajevo settlement, on 17 September 1921 against SAŠK Napredak which resulted in a 5–1 defeat. The next day another game was played, a 2–1 loss against Sarajevski ŠK.

In 1941, World War II came to Sarajevo, and all football activity was stopped. Many footballers were members of the resistance troops, and some of them were killed. After the war, Željo was reborn, and in 1946, it won the Bosnian Republic championship which was one of the 7 regional leagues formed in order to provide participants to the restored Yugoslav championship starting next season. As winners, Željezničar became one of the Bosnian representatives in the Yugoslav top-flight. Soon after, the Sarajevo citizens formed a new club called FK Sarajevo, the club that has remained a major annoyance to Željezničar's fans (known as The Maniacs) until today. That had an influence on the club, so it needed several years to come back to the first division. For most of the time, Željezničar played in the top level. It was relegated four times (the last time in the 1976–77 season), but every time (except the first time in 1947) it returned quickly.

==== Planinić affair ====
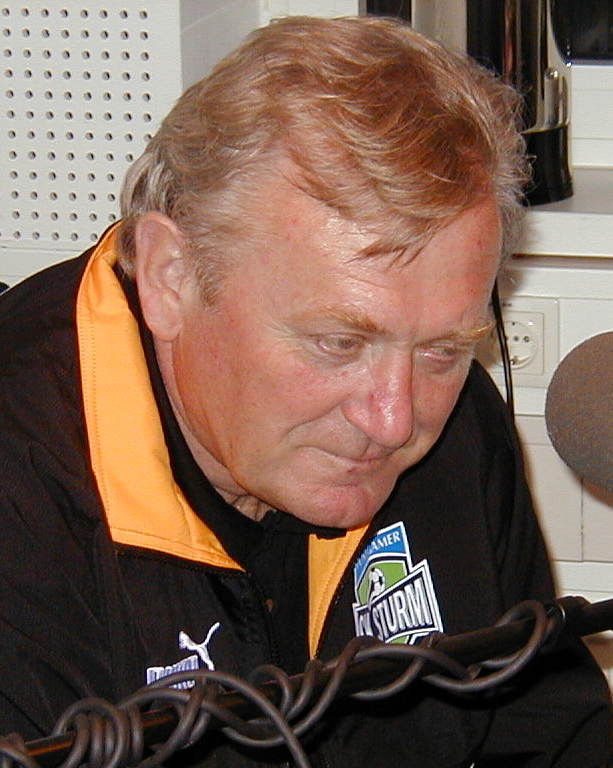
Club legend Ivica Osim reached 1984–85 UEFA Cup semi-finals as manager of Željezničar. Father of Amar Osim

In 1964, the Football Association of Yugoslavia found Željezničar guilty for match fixing. Alongside Željezničar, Hajduk Split and Trešnjevka were found guilty and were ejected from the First Yugoslav League. Among others, Željezničar players Ivica Osim and Mišo Smajlović were banned from football for one year, and executives from Željezničar including then club president Nusret Mahić were banned from football for life. After a month it was decided that the clubs will stay in the league but points will be deducted, six from Željezničar and five from Hajduk and Trešnjevka each.

==== UEFA Cup 1971–72 quarter-finalists ====
The club first appeared in European competitions during the 1963 Mitropa Cup, however serious competitions had to wait until the early 1970s when the team finished the 1970–71 Yugoslav First League season in 2nd place, a result which allowed the club to play in the 1971–72 UEFA Cup where they made the quarter-finals on their very first appearance losing to Ferencvárosi in a penalty shootout.

==== 1971–72 Yugoslav champions ====
1971–72 Yugoslav First League table (top 5 only):

Pos	Team	Pld	W	D	L	GF	GA	GD	Pts	Qualification or relegation
1	Željezničar (C)	34	21	9	4	55	20	+35	51	Qualification for European Cup first round
2	Red Star Belgrade	34	19	11	4	57	21	+36	49	Qualification for UEFA Cup first round
3	OFK Belgrade	34	17	11	6	56	26	+30	45	Qualification for UEFA Cup first round
4	Vojvodina	34	15	12	7	50	38	+12	42	Qualification for UEFA Cup first round
5	Partizan	34	15	9	10	41	35	+6	39	

Source: rsssf.org
Rules for classification: 1) points; 2) goal difference; 3) number of goals scored.
(C) Champions

Željezničar's greatest domestic success at the time came in the 1971–72 season when the team won the championship title, their only top-tier title in the Yugoslav period, which qualified the club for the European Cup during the 1972–73 season where they were eliminated in the first round by Derby County.

Željezničar also finished in third place in the top-tier league on two occasions in a league traditionally dominated by the big four clubs (Red Star Belgrade, Partizan, Hajduk Split and Dinamo Zagreb).

==== 1980–81 Marshal Tito Cup finalists ====
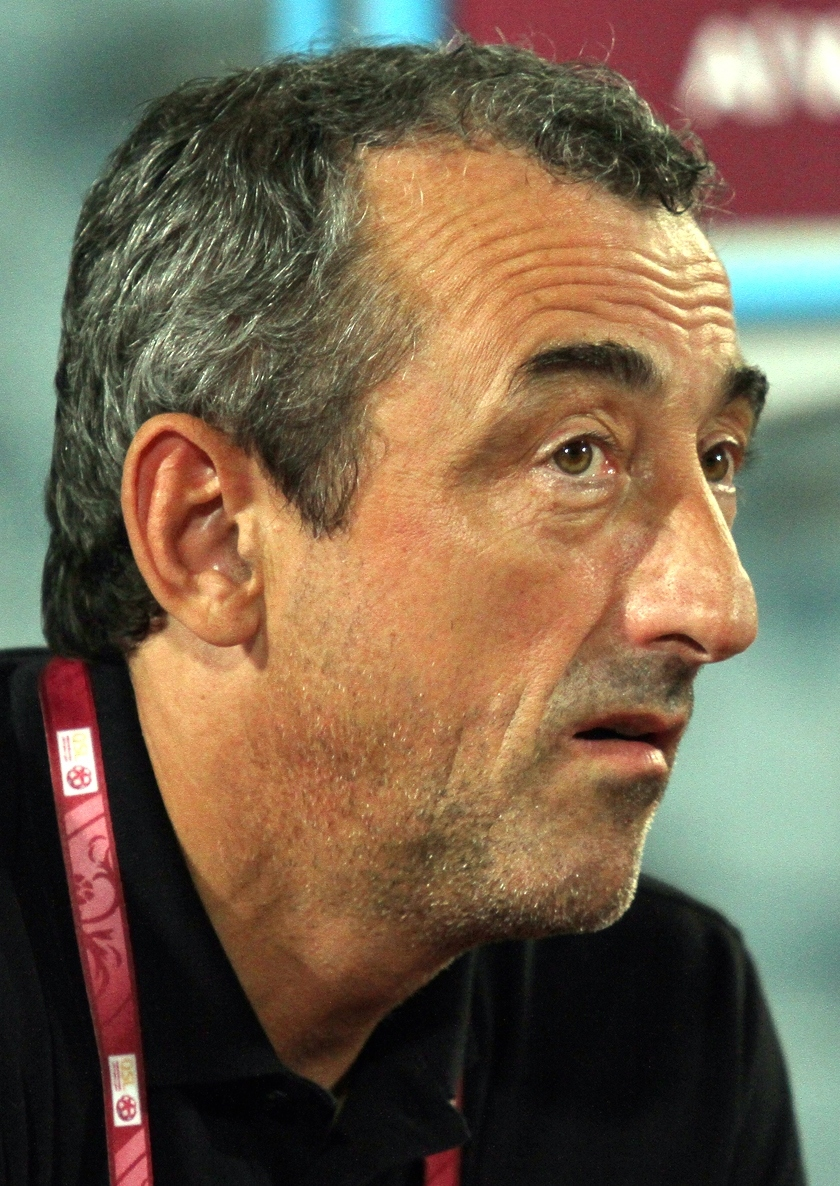
Mehmed Baždarević scored twice in the 1980–81 Yugoslav Cup final. Former Bosnia and Herzegovina national football team manager

In the 1980–81 season, Željezničar reached the Yugoslav cup final (Marshal Tito Cup), but lost 2–3 to another Bosnian side Velež Mostar with both Mehmed Baždarević and Vahid Halilhodžić scoring a brace for their respective teams. The venue for the final was the Red Star Stadium in Belgrade played in front of 40,000 fans. That season, Željezničar finished the 1980–81 Yugoslav First League in a disappointing 14th position which meant the club did not play in Europe even though it made the Yugoslav Cup final.

==== UEFA Cup 1984–85 semi-finalists ====
Željezničar's best international result was recorded in the 1984–85 season. The team, led by manager Ivica Osim, reached the semi-finals of the UEFA Cup (renamed to UEFA Europa League since the 2009–10 season) where they were eliminated by Hungarian team Videoton. Željezničar finished the domestic championship in third place in the season before, qualifying them for the competition. Željezničar appeared to have had the result at home, leading 2–0 (3–3 on aggregate) against the Hungarians that would send them into a final against Spanish club Real Madrid on the away goals rule; however, two minutes from full-time Videoton scored a crucial goal, eliminating the home side 4–3 on aggregate. Edin Bahtić finished the competition as second-top scorer with 7 goals, one short of József Szabó.

Prior to this success, the team played the quarter-final stage of the inaugural year of the UEFA Cup competition.

=== Post-independence (1992–present) ===
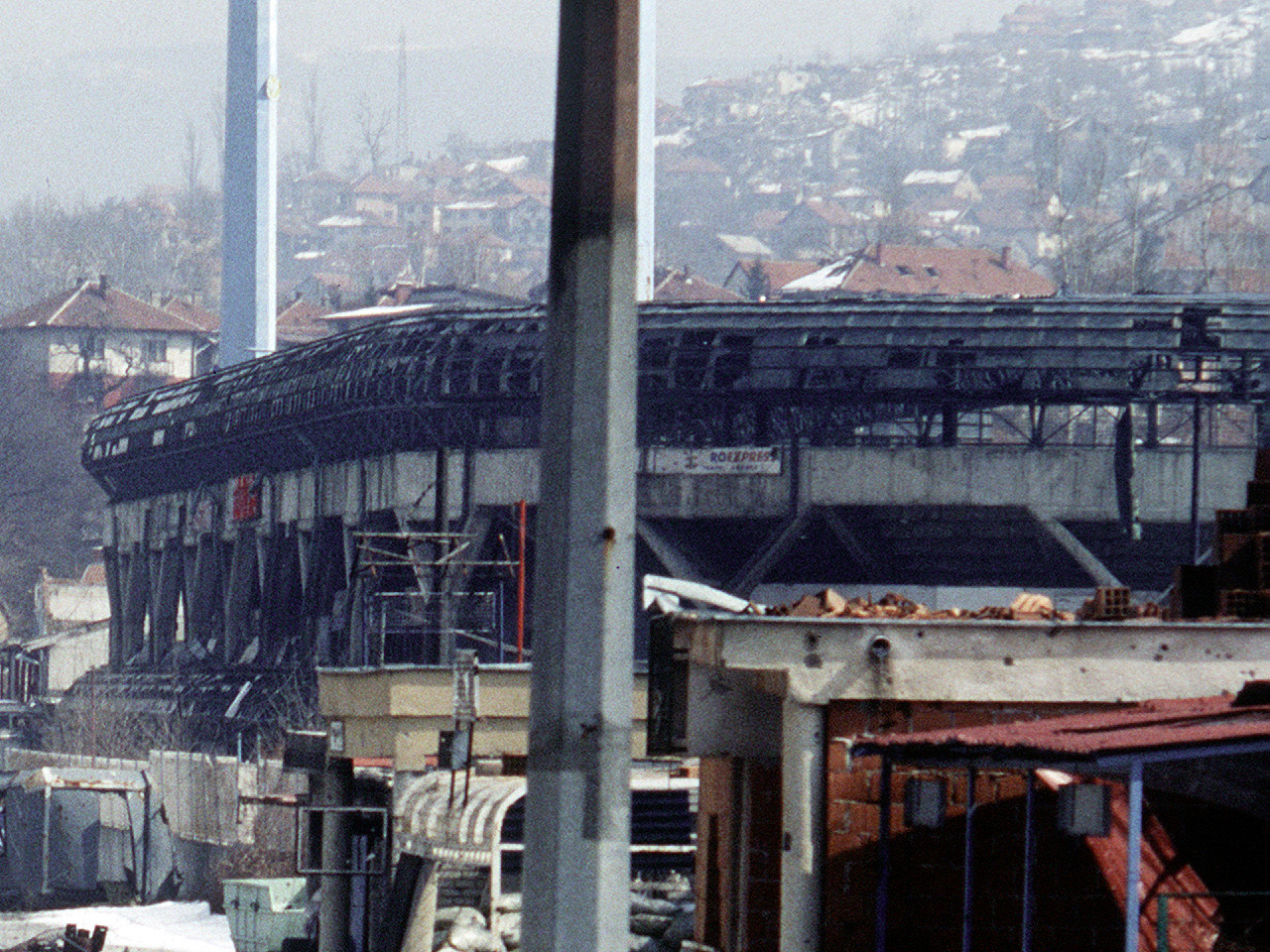
Grbavica Stadium during the Siege of Sarajevo

After the independence of Bosnia and Herzegovina, war broke out and football stopped. The game between Željezničar and FK Rad scheduled to be played on 5 April 1992 at Stadion Grbavica as part of Round 26 of the 1991–92 Yugoslav First League was abandoned 35 minutes (14:55 p.m. local time) before kick-off due to gunfire around the stadium, a result of the first attack on Sarajevo. Ultimately, the club's final completed match in the Yugoslav Championship was a 6–1 defeat on 29 March 1992 in Belgrade against Partizan. Players like Mario Stanić, Rade Bogdanović, Gordan Vidović, Suvad Katana and many others had days earlier went abroad to escape the horror of war, leaving it up to junior players to play out remaining rounds of the championships. However, all of Željezničar's matches in the 2nd half of the 1991–92 season were declared void due to rule, as the club could not play out remaining matches due to the ensuing war. In 25 (out of possible 33) rounds completed, the club collected 6 wins, 4 draws and 15 losses, with a 22:42 goal difference.

The stadium was right on the front lines, and on 7 May 1992, the western side was destroyed along with SD Željezničar premises near by, however Željezničar managed to take part in the 1994–95 First League of Bosnia and Herzegovina championship, playing its home matches in Grbavica. The fourth-place result was not as important as simply taking part.

The war ended in 1995 so a regular championship was formed contested only by Bosniak and Croatian clubs with Serb clubs joining some years later.

During the 1997–98 championship, a play-off was held and the final match on 5 June saw two big city rivals playing for the trophy. FK Sarajevo played well, their shots were cleared from the goal-line twice. In the 89th minute, one ball was intercepted on the left side, and after a couple of passes it came to Željezničar forward Hadis Zubanović who scored a dramatic winner. That was the only goal of the game which brought his club its first championship title in independent Bosnia and Herzegovina. Among Željezničar club fans, this day, titled "Zubandan", is celebrated every year.

==== 2000s: Two-time league champions ====
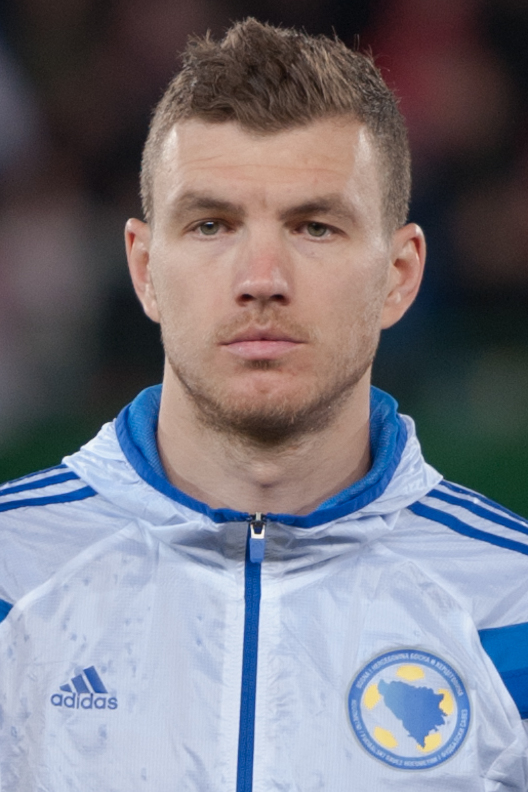
Bosnia and Herzegovina national team captain Edin Džeko began his career at Željo

For a long time, Željezničar were the only club that were able to defend their title in the Bosnian Premier League, as champions in the 2000–01 and 2001–02 season under the command of Ivica Osim's son, Amar Osim. The club repeated this success again in the early 2010s. Under Amar's command, Željezničar also won the 2000–01 national cup, which completed the double, the first time any club in Bosnia and Herzegovina achieved that, securing also the 2001 Bosnian Supercup. In the 2001–02 season, they were runners-up in the cup, but were not able to defend their Bosnian Supercup title (even though they won the league) as it was discontinued. Amar was dismissed from the club in October 2003 after the club was runner-up in the 2002–03 season, won the 2002–03 national cup and reached the club's biggest European success since competing as part of the Bosnian Premier League, that is the 2002–03 Champions league third qualifying round which they lost against Newcastle United. They continued their journey in the UEFA Cup, losing to Málaga due to a penalty they scored in the second leg. Željezničar finished as runners-up both seasons after Amar Osim's departure. After they secured qualification for the 2005–06 UEFA Cup through their league position, they failed to get a licence for European competition, missing out on substantial financial gain from UEFA. This led to many problems for the club, and over the next four seasons Željezničar struggled in the middle of the league.

As the best Bosnian club, the club played in European cups every year. The best result (for Bosnian club football as well since independence) came in 2002, when Željezničar reached the third qualifying round of the UEFA Champions League, having eliminated Akraness and Lillestrøm in previous rounds to get there. Sir Bobby Robson's Newcastle United, captained by Alan Shearer, were too strong, winning 5–0 on aggregate when Sanel Jahić received a red card in the 69th minute of the reverse leg at St James' Park. The game was held at Koševo Stadium in front of 36,000 fans from all over Bosnia and Herzegovina, and to this day is among the best attended games in Bosnian club football history, although short of a match at the same stadium between the Bosnia and Herzegovina national football team's 2–1 friendly win over Italy in November 1996, which was attended by 40,000. Newcastle United reached the second group stage of the tournament later on in the season.

The club, as result of losing to Newcastle United, entered the UEFA Cup first round, but lost to Málaga who were an eventual quarter-finalist.

==== 2010s: Three-time league champions ====
With the return of Amar Osim in the summer of 2009, Željezničar once more claimed the title in the 2009–10 season, but failed to take the double as they lost in the final of the 2009–10 Bosnian cup to Borac Banja Luka on away goals, while remaining undefeated. In the following 2010–11 season, the club failed to defend their Premier League title, finishing third. However, Željezničar managed to win the national cup instead, their fourth, against Čelik Zenica. During the 2011–12 season, they brought back the league title to Grbavica, their sixth domestic league title, three rounds before the end of the season, breaking many records on the way (run of 35 games without loss; 12 straight league wins; 3 seasons in Bosnian Cup competition without loss). Željezničar also won the 2011–12 Bosnian cup, claiming their second double in their history, both won under the managing of Amar Osim. As a result, Amar Osim became the most successful manager in terms of trophies won since the creation of the club, with nine. The club was for a long time undefeated in the Bosnian Cup matches since the first round of the 2008–09 Bosnian Cup season, having won two Cup finals and losing one on aggregate since the 2008–09 season.

During the 2010–11 season, Željezničar won their fourth cup title. They advanced to the final beating Široki Brijeg on 3–0 aggregate. In the final they clash with rivals from the former Yugoslav League, Čelik Zenica. The first game was played at Grbavica Stadium which finished 1–0 in favor of the home team. The second game was played at Bilino Polje Stadium which Željezničar won 3–0 and won 4–0 on aggregate. That concluded Željezničar's season in which they were automatically gave to compete in the UEFA Europa League. Željezničar were able to celebrate their 90th birthday with a trophy.

In the 2011–12 season, Željezničar won their 6th title in the team's existence. They won the title with three rounds left in the competition. They repeated the successful campaign in cup competition also when they won the title with 1–0 on aggregate against Široki Brijeg. That was the first double for any club since unified Bosnia and Herzegovina football competitions started in 2002–03 season. In the 2012–13 season, Željezničar won their 7th title in the club's history, 6th Bosnian one, once again under the guidance of Amar Osim.

Between 2013 and 2018, Željezničar was trophyless, despite finishing 2nd on three occasions. The trophy drought ended in May 2018, as the club won the 2017–18 Bosnian Cup under the guidance of manager Admir Adžem. Following a string of poor results, manager Milomir Odović resigned in October 2018. On 31 December 2018, Amar Osim returned for a second time to manage the club, signing a three-and-a-half-year contract with the club.

==== 2020s: 100 years of the club and partial decline ====
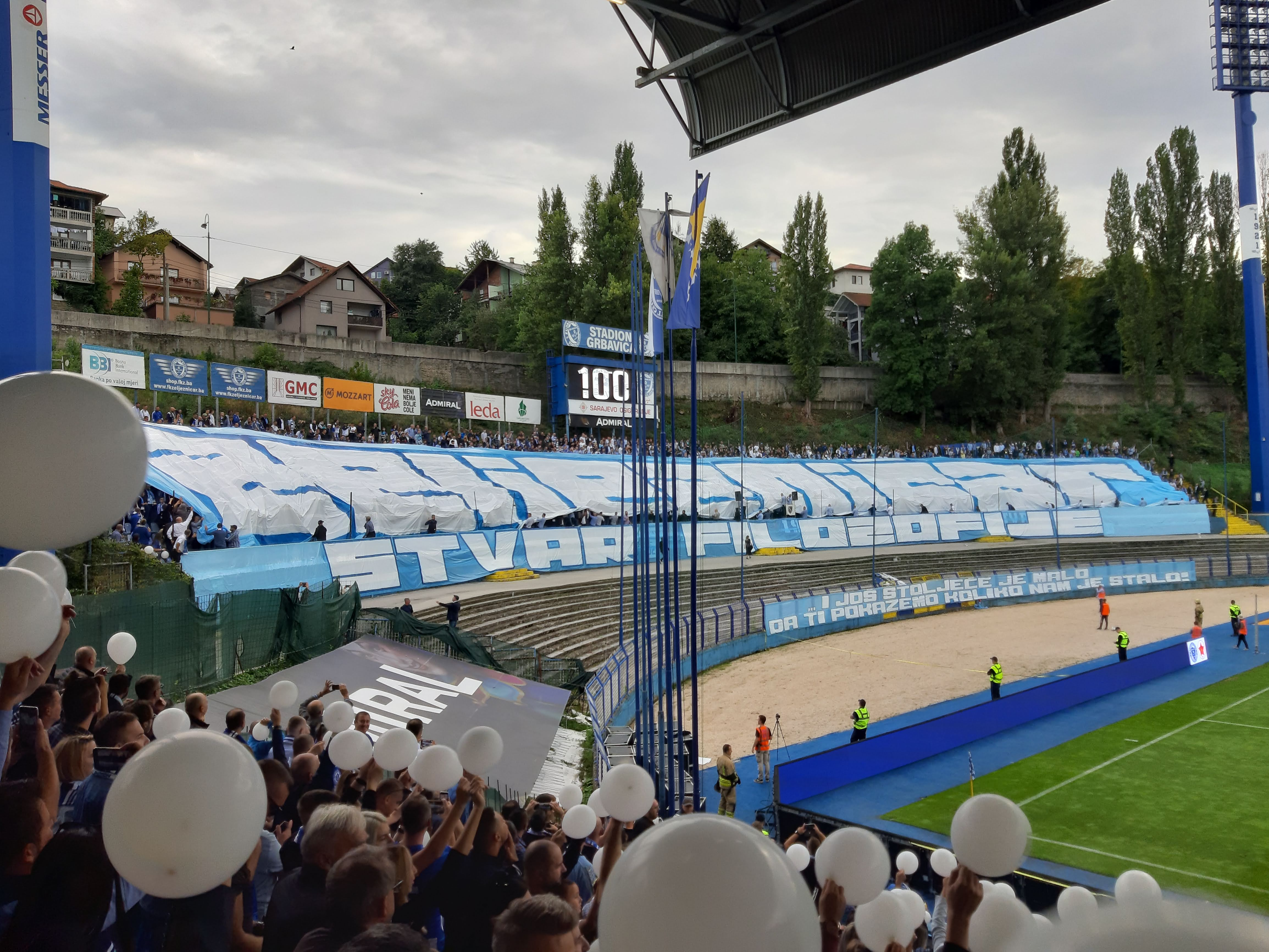
Celebration of the Maniacs for the 100 years of Željezničar during a league game against Velež Mostar, 18 September 2021

The 2019–20 Bosnian Premier League season ended abruptly on 1 June 2020 due to the COVID-19 pandemic in Bosnia and Herzegovina, with Željezničar having to settle with a second spot finish on table. City rivals Sarajevo won the title even though Željezničar won six points from two derby matches played during the league season. In the 2019–20 Bosnian Cup, they finished at the semi-final stage as the competition was also cancelled due to the pandemic.

The club started the 2020–21 season strongly, winning their four opening matches, however their run in the 2020–21 UEFA Europa League was affected due to the pandemic. The first qualifying round match between Maccabi Haifa, originally scheduled to be played on 27 August 2020 was postponed due to five members from Željezničar's delegation testing positive for COVID-19 and the whole team being put into quarantine by the Israeli authorities. Originally six players earlier tested positive and did not travel, being left in Sarajevo. The team returned to Sarajevo before UEFA made a decision to finally play the match on 9 September at Sammy Ofer Stadium in Haifa. Željezničar traveled again but lost 3–1 (thus eliminated after revised rules due to the pandemic) after being in quarantine 9 days prior with little to no training and no competitive matches since a shock loss at home to Mladost Doboj Kakanj in the 5th round on 21 August of the 2020–21 Bosnian Premier League season. During an eight-game winless run in the league, which had culminated with a home draw against Mladost Doboj Kakanj, Amar Osim was sacked by the club on 11 April 2021.

Following lackluster showings and mid-table finishes in the 2020–21 and 2021–22 seasons, Željezničar qualified for the 2023–24 UEFA Europa Conference League qualifiers in the 2022–23 season. The 2023–24 season was the club's most unsuccessful one in its post-war history, as it ended up in an unexpected relegation battle. Dino Đurbuzović was appointed as Željezničar's caretaker manager in April 2024, and helped the side avoid relegation with three games remaining. The 2024–25 season turned out to be far better for the club, as Željezničar finished in fourth, winning its biggest amount of points in over ten years and securing a spot in the 2025–26 UEFA Conference League qualifying phase. However, it also marked yet another trophyless season, with the club reaching the 2024–25 Bosnian Cup semi-finals, before getting eliminated by Široki Brijeg.

In December 2025, Bosnian‑American businessman Sanin Mirvić joined Željezničar as its strategic partner and financial investor.

== Stadium ==
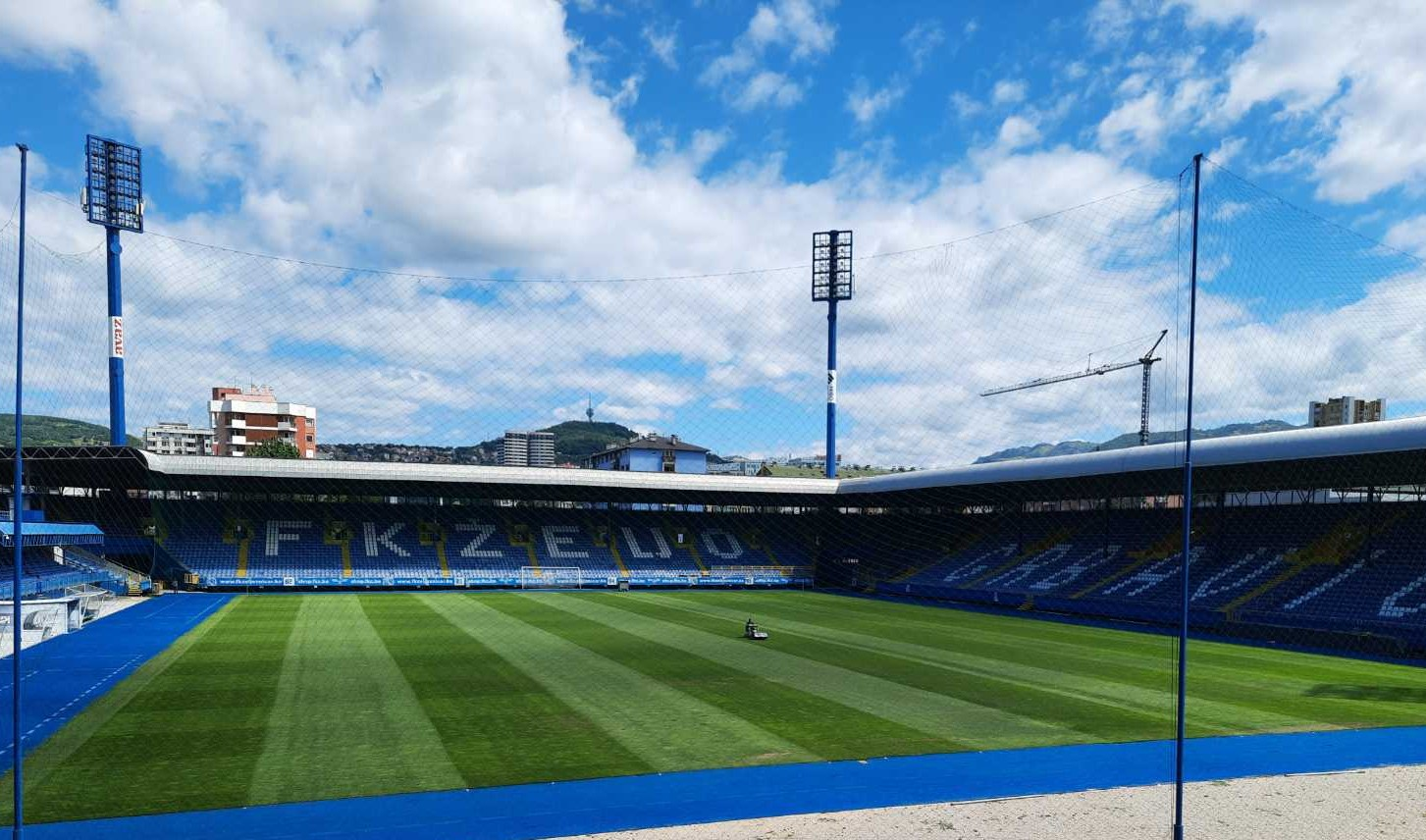
Željezničar's home ground in July 2022

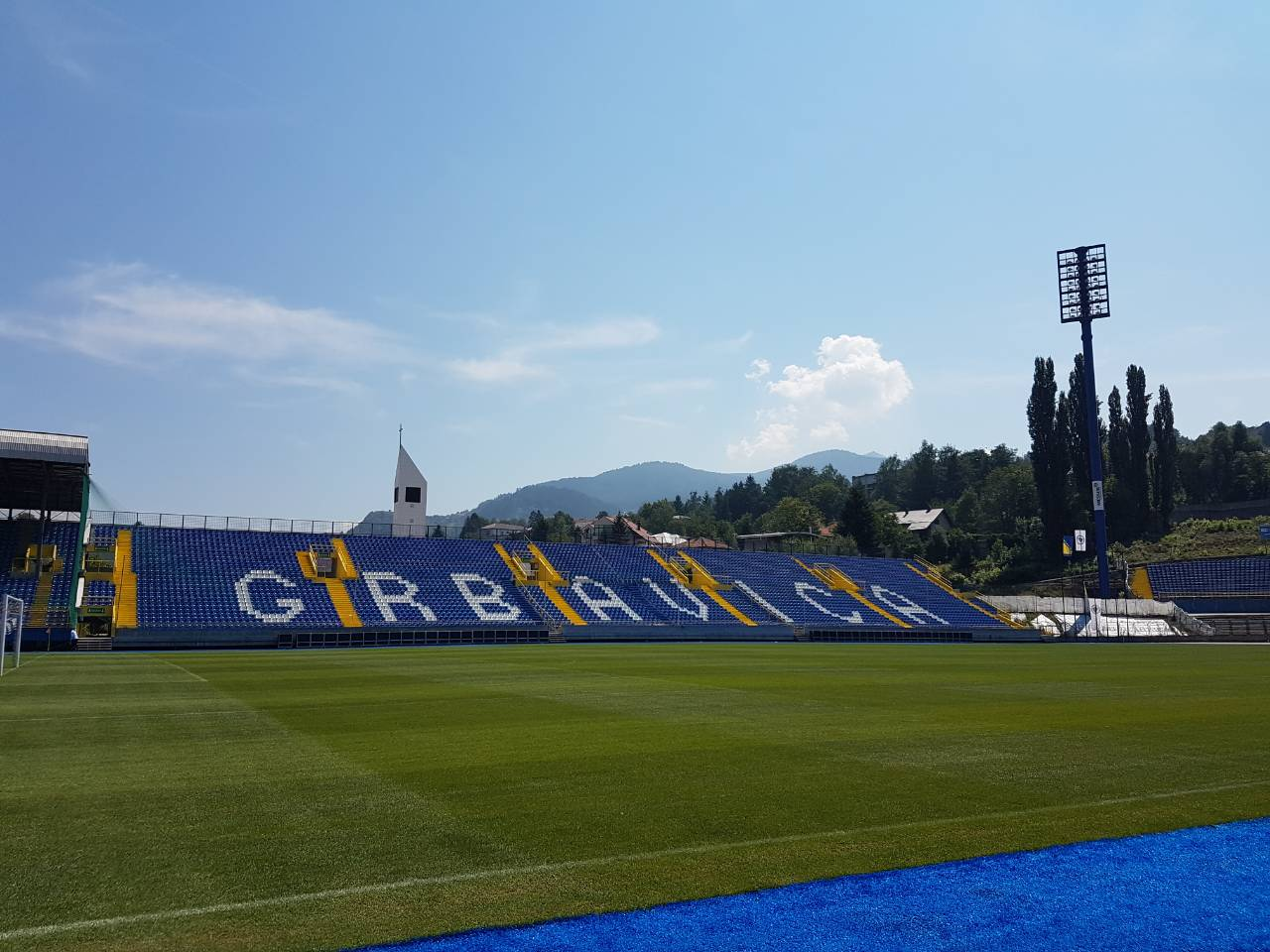
East stand of Grbavica Stadium following turf grass replacement in 2018

The club had no stadium upon its foundation as other clubs would not allow Željezničar to use the existing football grounds in Sarajevo. The club played their first matches at a military training pitch called Egzercir which wasn't actually a football ground, however, it was the best ground available and will always be remembered as the club's first pitch. Egzercir was located in a part of Sarajevo known as Čengić vila. In 1932, a new ground was built in Pofalići (yet another part of Sarajevo), close to the railway station. It wasn't much better than the last one, but it was built by the club and because of that it had a special meaning.

After World War II, Željezničar played at the "6th April" Stadium in Marijin Dvor (there is a building now on the spot, behind the technical sciences secondary school) until 18 June 1950. Authorities planned to build a street, so the club made another move to military stadium in Skenderija. Club staff was tired of all that moving and they decided to build its own stadium in Grbavica neighborhood which just started to be redeveloped and urbanized. Friends, supporters, members of the club and even military, all helped in construction. Stadium was officially opened on 13 September 1951 with the second league match between Željezničar and Šibenik. Željezničar won 4–1.

Ever since, Grbavica has been a place of joy and sorrow for the club and its supporters. Symbolically, the old railway line passed over the hill behind the stadium, and every time a train went by during a match it would sound its whistle to salute the fans. The stadium had a south side and a small east side while a wooden grandstand with a roof was on the west side. The grandstand was relocated from the "6th April" Stadium on the same year when Željezničar moved. Because of the reconstruction, Željezničar moved again in 1968 to Koševo Stadium and even won the club's only Yugoslav title in 1972 playing there.

Grbavica was reopened yet again on 25 April 1976, and in 1986 a modern northern stand was added which is still in use. Unfortunately, war began in spring 1992 and Željezničar was forced, yet again, to play on Koševo Stadium until 1996 when it came back to Grbavica. During the 1990s war, the stadium suffered heavy structural damage. The stadium was located between the first front lines and endured heavy fighting. Bosnian Serbs' forces burned down the wooden grandstand under which all the club facilities were located consequently burning down most of the club's records and trophies in the process as well. It was not until 2 May 1996 that a football match would be played on Grbavica Stadium again. Symbolically, the first match after the war was the Sarajevo derby. The wooden grandstand that burned up during the war was never fully reconstructed and on its place, on the west side of the stadium, a much smaller wooden stand was built under which, yet again, all the club facilities are located. In 2016, the wooden stand was reconstructed and slightly expanded in a way that all the wood elements were replaced with anti-slip metal in order to meet the UEFA Stadium requirements.

Before the war capacity of the stadium was more than 20,000 unseated, but now it officially has 13,057 seated places.

== Name of the club ==
Željezničar was formed as RŠD Željezničar (Radničko športsko društvo, eng. Workers' sports society). Željezničar means railwayman or railway worker. Later it was known as FK Željezničar (Fudbalski klub, eng. football club), and was a part of SD Željezničar (Sportsko društvo, eng. sports society) which includes the clubs in other sports (basketball, handball, volleyball, chess, bowling, etc.) with the same name. In 1993, the initial acronym was changed to NK (Nogometni klub, eng. football club). In Bosnian, both fudbal and nogomet are equally used as a word for football. The word fudbal is dominant in the eastern and northern parts of the country, while nogomet is more used in its western parts. Since 2000, the club has officially been using the initial FK in its name.

In modern times, there is a restaurant named after the club's name. Such example is a ćevapi – the national dish – restaurant in Baščaršija, Sarajevo's old bazaar, called Ćevabdžinica "Željo".

== Colours ==
Blue is traditionally the colour of railway workers in this part of Europe. Since the club was founded by the railway workers, blue was a logical choice. Navy blue was always on the club's crest, but that was not always the case with kits. Sometimes they were light blue, sometimes regular blue, and sometimes navy blue, like the crest. Sometimes kits were blue with white vertical stripes. For some games in the 1999–00 season, the kits were striped horizontally, and in 2002–03 season they were dark grey, without any traces of blue. The away kit has always been white.

On the left side of the kit, by the heart, stands a crest. Since the foundation of the club, standard elements of the crest were ball and wings, also a traditional railway symbol. These standard elements were changed in design several times in the past. Some other elements were added or excluded in some periods of history. For example, a circle around the original crest was added in the 1990s. From 1945 to 1992 red five-pointed star stood in place of the ball, and the words "Sarajevo", "1921" and others were moved from one part of the crest to another many times. The current design dates back to 2000.

== Supporters ==
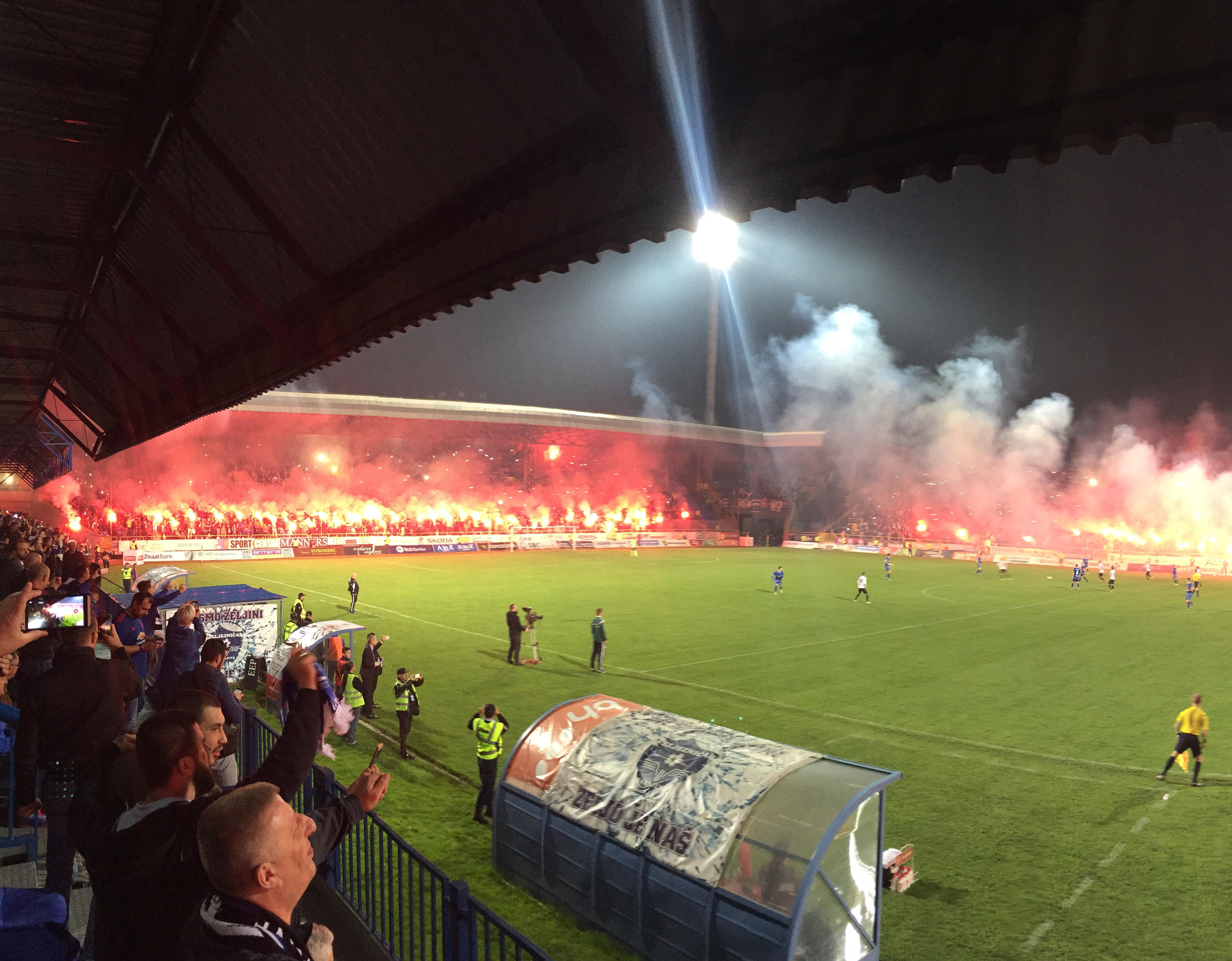
Club supporters

FK Željezničar main supporter group are called The Maniacs. There is also subgroups like Blue Tigers, Joint Union, Urban Corps, Stari Grad and Vendetta.

In popular culture, Stole Anđelović (known as Stole iz Bora) from Bor, Serbia, became known for traveling 450 km to attend FK Željezničar Sarajevo home matches over a period of more than 40 years. He was also a supporter of the Yugoslav national team and a fan of Ivica Osim.

A group of fans associated with 1921.ba TV regularly upload reports on Željezničar league and European matches, along with interviews featuring players and club staff, to YouTube.

== Rivalries ==
=== Sarajevo derby (Vječiti derbi) ===
Željezničar has a fierce rivalry with their city-rivals Sarajevo, which is known as the Sarajevo derby, the biggest derby in Bosnia and Herzegovina. It is contested regularly since both teams are part of the Premier League of Bosnia and Herzegovina.

During the 2015–16 season the club beat Sarajevo both home at Grbavica and away, a first time the club has beaten Sarajevo away at Koševo in 12 years. During the 2017–18 league season, Željezničar beat Sarajevo in 3 out of 4 league matches, the most in one season and didn't even lose that season as there was also 1 draw. In the 2018–19 league season, Željezničar lost against Sarajevo in 2 out of 3 league matches, the most in one season and didn't even win that season as there was also 1 draw.

The most recent match was played on 9 September 2026, which Željezničar won 2–0 at Grbavica.

=== Željezničar – Borac Banja Luka rivalry ===
Also another notable rivalry started to shape in recent years. Since the season 2008–09, the time when Borac started to be standard in the Premier League once again, a great rivalry started to develop between the two teams. Starting from the 2009–10 season the two teams mainly competed against each other for one of the titles (the league title or national cup) and even the attendance almost got on pair with the Sarajevo derby. The rivalry also has a root in the fact that Sarajevo and Banja Luka are, by a good margin, the two biggest cities in Bosnia and Herzegovina, the first being also the capital of the whole country while the second takes the role as the de facto capital of Republika Srpska entity.

== Kit manufacturers ==
Period	Kit Provider	Shirt Sponsor
1971–1980		Unioninvest
1980–1981		Šipad
1981–1984		Gro Put Sarajevo
1984–1988	(Germany) Adidas	ŽTP Sarajevo
1985–1990		Zetatrans
1990–1993		Tehnika
1993–1994	(Italy) Lotto	Intersport
1997–1998		Drina
1998–2002		Bosnalijek
2002–2003	(Italy) Diadora	Bosnalijek
2003–2005	(Italy) Diadora	Liqui Moly
2005–2006	(Italy) Legea	Liqui Moly
2006–2007	(Spain) Joma	Liqui Moly
2007–2009	(Spain) Joma	Logosoft
2009–2010	(Spain) Joma	CODE
2010–2011	(Italy) Legea	CODE
2011–2012	(Italy) Macron	CODE
2012–2013	(Belgium) Patrick	Sarajevo Osiguranje
2013–2016	(Spain) Joma	UniCredit Bank
2016	(Italy) Diadora	
2017–2018	(Italy) Diadora	Ziraat Bankası
2018–2020	(United Kingdom) Umbro	Ziraat Bankası
2020–2021	(Italy) Macron	
2021	(Italy) Macron	Mozzart
2021–2022	(Italy) Macron	Caizcoin
2022–2024	(Italy) Macron	The Maniacs
2024–present	(Italy) Macron	WWin

== Honours ==
=== Domestic ===
Type	Competition	Titles	Seasons
Domestic	First League/Premier League of Bosnia and Herzegovina	6	1997–98, 2000–01, 2001–02, 2009–10, 2011–12, 2012–13
Domestic	Yugoslav First League	1	1971–72
Domestic	Yugoslav Second League	3	1956–57 (zone II A), 1961–62 (west), 1977–78 (west)
Domestic	Bosnia and Herzegovina Republic League (Note: The Football Association of Bosnia and Herzegovina is yet to recognize Željezničar's Bosnia and Herzegovina Republic League title as an official honour.)	1	1946
Domestic	Bosnia and Herzegovina Cup	6	1999–2000, 2000–01, 2002–03, 2010–11, 2011–12, 2017–18
Domestic	Supercup of Bosnia and Herzegovina	3	1998, 2000, 2001

- record

=== European ===
- UEFA Cup/UEFA Europa League:
  - Semi-finalists (1): 1984–85
  - Quarter-finalists (1): 1971–72

=== Doubles ===
- Premier League and National Cup (2): 2000–01, 2011–12 (record)

Especially short competitions such as the Supercup of Bosnia and Herzegovina, Intercontinental Cup (now defunct), FIFA Club World Cup or UEFA Super Cup are not generally considered to contribute towards a Double or Treble, but they contribute to the bigger tuples.

== Željezničar in Europe ==
=== Summary ===
As of 17 July 2025

Competition	P	W	D	L	GF	GA	GD
European Cup / Champions League	16	4	1	11	13	31	−18
UEFA Cup / Europa League	55	21	14	20	71	67	+4
Conference League	6	1	3	2	8	11	−3
Total	77	26	18	33	92	109	−17

P = Matches played; W = Matches won; D = Matches drawn; L = Matches lost; GF = Goals for; GA = Goals against; GD = Goals difference. Defunct competitions indicated in italics.

=== Best results in European competitions ===
Season	Achievement	Notes
UEFA Cup
1971–72	Quarter-final	eliminated on penalties by (Hungary) Ferencváros 2–1 in Budapest, 1–2 in Sarajevo
1984–85	Semi-final	eliminated by (Hungary) Videoton 2–1 in Sarajevo, 1–3 in Fehérvár
Mitropa Cup
1962–63	Semi-final	eliminated by (Hungary) MTK Budapest 1–1 in Sarajevo, 0–1 in Budapest
1968–69	Semi-final	eliminated by (Czechoslovakia) Sklo Union Teplice 1–1 in Sarajevo, 1–2 in Teplice

== Records ==
- Biggest ever league victory: Željezničar – Barkohba 18–2 (23 March 1925, Second Sarajevo division)
- Biggest ever league defeat: 1–9 on several occasions
- Biggest Yugoslav first division victory: Željezničar – Maribor 8–0 (29 August 1971)
- Biggest Yugoslav first division defeat: Dinamo Zagreb – Željezničar 9–1 (29 September 1946)
- Biggest Sarajevo derby victory by Željezničar: Željezničar – Torpedo 9–1 (29 December 1946)
- Biggest Bosnian league victory: Željezničar – Krajina Cazin 8–0 (31 March 2001), Željezničar – Leotar 8–0 (28 August 2010)
- Biggest Bosnian league defeat: Zmaj od Bosne – Željezničar 9–1 (4 November 1995)
- Most overall official appearances: Blagoje Bratić (343)
- Most league appearances: Hajrudin Saračević (313)
- Most league games without loss (Bosnia and Herzegovina): 35 games (2011–12 season)
- Most straight wins (Bosnia and Herzegovina): 12 league games
- Most overall official goals: Josip Bukal, Dželaludin Muharemović (127)
- Most league goals: Dželaludin Muharemović (112)
- Most league goals in a season by team: 113 (2000–01 season)
- Most league goals in a season by player: 31 (Dželaludin Muharemović in 2000–01 season)
- Most capped player: Mehmed Baždarević (54 caps for Yugoslavia, 2 caps for Bosnia and Herzegovina)

=== Record departures ===
	Player	To	Fee	Year
1.	(Saudi Arabia) Abdulmalik Al-Jaber	(Saudi Arabia) Al-Nassr	>€1.8m (Note: Željezničar did not specify the transfer fee, but announced that it was a record amount for the club.)	2025
2.	(Bosnia and Herzegovina) Semir Štilić	(Poland) Lech Poznań	€600,000	2008
=3.	(Bosnia and Herzegovina) Amir Hadžiahmetović	(Turkey) Konyaspor	€500,000	2016
=3.	(Bosnia and Herzegovina) Riad Bajić	(Turkey) Konyaspor	€500,000	2015
5.	(Bosnia and Herzegovina) Anel Šabanadžović	(Greece) AEK Athens	€450,000	2019
=6.	(Bosnia and Herzegovina) Ibrahim Šehić	(Turkey) Mersin İdman Yurdu	€400,000	2011
=7.	(Bosnia and Herzegovina) Edin Višća	(Turkey) İstanbul Başakşehir	€400,000	2011
=8.	(Bosnia and Herzegovina) Nermin Zolotić	(Belgium) Gent	€300,000	2014
=8.	(Croatia) Ivan Lendrić	(France) Lens	€300,000	2017
=8.	(Senegal) Boubacar Dialiba	(Spain) Real Murcia	€300,000	2008

== Players ==
=== Current squad ===
As of 19 October 2026

Note: Flags indicate national team as defined under FIFA eligibility rules; some limited exceptions apply. Players may hold more than one non-FIFA nationality.

No.	Pos.	Nation	Player
1	GK	BIH	Tarik Abdulahović
4	DF	CRO	Marin Karamarko
5	DF	BIH	Amar Ibrišimović (on loan from Schalke 04 II)
6	MF	SRB	Aleksa Pejić (captain)
7	MF	SEN	Yacouba Dabo
8	MF	BIH	Afan Fočo
9	FW	BIH	Aldian Korora
10	MF	BIH	Madžid Šošić
11	MF	MKD	Matej Cvetanoski
14	MF	POR	Afonso Vitorino
15	DF	BIH	Bojan Nastić
16	MF	BIH	Dženan Šabić
19	FW	CRO	Ante Kuliš
20	DF	CUW	Giovanni Troupée
22	MF	BIH	Admir Gojak

No.	Pos.	Nation	Player
23	MF	BIH	Eldar Dragović
24	DF	BIH	Ajdin Raščić
27	MF	BIH	Deni Milošević
28	MF	LBR	Jonathan Freeman
29	FW	AUT	Muharem Husković
30	DF	GER	Marko Karamarko
32	DF	SLO	Sandro Jovanović
33	DF	NED	Collin Seedorf
34	MF	TUR	Doruk Tuğrul
41	GK	ESP	Ángel Jiménez
49	FW	BRA	Gabriel Cunha
55	MF	BIH	Armin Hodžić
88	MF	BIH	Samir Radovac
90	FW	POR	Rodrigo Piloto
99	GK	BIH	Alvin Ćosić

=== Youth academy players ===
Academy players that received a first-team squad call-up.

No.	Pos.	Nation	Player
25	DF	BIH	Daris Kelmendi

=== Out on loan ===
Note: Flags indicate national team as defined under FIFA eligibility rules; some limited exceptions apply. Players may hold more than one non-FIFA nationality.

No.	Pos.	Nation	Player
17	MF	NGR	Olanrewaju Ibraheem (at Zvijezda Gradačac until 30 June 2027)

== Club officials ==
=== Coaching staff ===
Name	Role
Vacant	Head coach
(Bosnia and Herzegovina) Sabit Šljivo	Assistant coach
(Bosnia and Herzegovina) Kenan Hasagić	Goalkeeping coach
(Slovenia) Matic Lukman Čoko	Fitness coach
(Bosnia and Herzegovina) Emil Šabanović	Video analyst
(Bosnia and Herzegovina) Milan Gutović	Scout
(Bosnia and Herzegovina) Aleksandar Kosorić	Team manager
(Bosnia and Herzegovina) Zlatko Dervišević	Doctors
(Bosnia and Herzegovina) Harun Đozić	Doctors
(Bosnia and Herzegovina) Mahir Moro	Doctors
(Bosnia and Herzegovina) Raif Zeba	Physiotherapists
(Bosnia and Herzegovina) Adil Hubijar	Physiotherapists
(Bosnia and Herzegovina) Emir Kraljušić	Physiotherapists
(Bosnia and Herzegovina) Erdijan Pekić	Commissioner for Security

=== Other information ===
Honorary Chairman of the Club	(Bosnia and Herzegovina) Ivica Osim
Chairman of the Board	(Bosnia and Herzegovina) Jusuf Tanović (Note: Tanović is chairman of the provisional Emergency Committee.)
Chairman of the Assembly	(Bosnia and Herzegovina) Armin Zelenturović
Chairman of the Supervisory Board	(Bosnia and Herzegovina) Marko Dmitrović
Director	Vacant
Sporting director	Vacant
General secretary	(Bosnia and Herzegovina) Lejla Dautbašić
Director of the Youth School	(Bosnia and Herzegovina) Edin Cocalić

Source: fkzeljeznicar.ba

== Notable managers ==
Dates	Name	Honours
1945–1947	(Socialist Federal Republic of Yugoslavia) Milan Rajlić	1946 Bosnian Republic League
1967–1976	(Socialist Federal Republic of Yugoslavia) Milan Ribar	1971–72 Yugoslav Championship; 1971–72 UEFA Cup quarter-finals
1978–1986	(Socialist Federal Republic of Yugoslavia) Ivica Osim	1984–85 UEFA Cup semi-finals
1998–1999	(Bosnia and Herzegovina) Enver Hadžiabdić	1997–98 Bosnian Championship; 1998 Bosnian Supercup
1999–2000	(Bosnia and Herzegovina) Enver Hadžiabdić	1999–2000 Bosnian Cup
2000–2001	(Bosnia and Herzegovina) Dino Đurbuzović	2000 Bosnian Supercup
2001–2003	(Bosnia and Herzegovina) Amar Osim	2000–01 Bosnian Championship; 2000–01 Bosnian Cup; 2001–02 Bosnian Championship; 2002–03 Bosnian Cup; 2001 Bosnian Supercup
2009–2013	(Bosnia and Herzegovina) Amar Osim	2009–10 Bosnian Championship; 2010–11 Bosnian Cup; 2011–12 Bosnian Championship; 2011–12 Bosnian Cup; 2012–13 Bosnian Championship
2017–2018	(Bosnia and Herzegovina) Admir Adžem	2017–18 Bosnian Cup

== Club ranking ==
According to the IFFHS list of the Top 200 European clubs of the 20th century, an organization recognized by FIFA, Željezničar is the highest ranked Bosnian club, sharing the 110th position on the list with AZ Alkmaar and Vitória de Guimarães. The club has produced many famous Yugoslav and Bosnian players, including Ivica Osim, Josip Katalinski, Mišo Smajlović, Blagoje Bratić, Hajrudin Saračević, Josip Bukal, Božo Janković, Mehmed Baždarević, Edin Bahtić, Radmilo Mihajlović, Haris Škoro, Nikola Nikić, Edin Ćurić, Dželaludin Muharemović, Edin Višća, Riad Bajić and Edin Džeko.

=== UEFA coefficient ===
==== 2022–23 season ====
As of 21 June 2023

Rank	Team	Points
360	(Finland) Honka	2.500
361	(North Macedonia) Sileks	2.500
362	(Slovenia) Celje	2.500
363	(Bosnia and Herzegovina) Željezničar	2.500
364	(Andorra) Engordany	2.500
365	(Malta) Balzan	2.500
366	(Slovenia) Rudar Velenje	2.500

== Affiliated clubs ==
The following clubs are currently affiliated with FK Željezničar:

- (Bosnia and Herzegovina) Igman Konjic (2021–present)
- (Bosnia and Herzegovina) Budućnost Banovići (2023–present)
