= List of FK Željezničar Sarajevo players =

Fudbalski klub Željezničar Sarajevo (English: Football Club Željezničar Sarajevo) is a professional football club based in Sarajevo, Bosnia and Herzegovina.

This is a list of all the players that have played for the club since its foundation, in 1921.

Only players that have played at least one match in any of the following competitions: domestic league, domestic cup and European competitions.

Players that only played in friendlies, tournaments and that were on trial are not included.

== A ==
- (Bosnia and Herzegovina) Adi Adilović
- (Bosnia and Herzegovina) Eldin Adilović
- (Bosnia and Herzegovina) Admir Adžem
- (Bosnia and Herzegovina) Mirzet Alagić
- (Bosnia and Herzegovina) Veljko Aleksić
- (Bosnia and Herzegovina) Anel Alibašić
- (Bosnia and Herzegovina) Haris Alihodžić
- (Bosnia and Herzegovina) Mehmed Alispahić
- (Kenya) Zablon Amanaka
- (Ghana) Joseph Amoah
- (Croatia) Marijan Antolović
- (Bosnia and Herzegovina) Ensar Arifović
- (Bosnia and Herzegovina) Arben Avdija

== B ==
- (Bosnia and Herzegovina) Delimir Bajić
- (Bosnia and Herzegovina) Riad Bajić
- (Bosnia and Herzegovina) Alen Bajkuša
- (Bosnia and Herzegovina) Zdenko Baotić
- (Bosnia and Herzegovina) Kenan Bećirović
- (Bosnia and Herzegovina) Samir Bekrić
- (Bosnia and Herzegovina) Haris Bešlija
- (Bosnia and Herzegovina) Mirsad Bešlija
- (Bosnia and Herzegovina) Bulend Biščević
- (North Macedonia) Dragan Bočeski
- (Bosnia and Herzegovina) Jadranko Bogičević
- (Serbia) Jovan Blagojević
- (Italy) Matteo Boccaccini
- (Bosnia and Herzegovina) Sead Bučan
- (Bosnia and Herzegovina) Semir Bukvić
- (Bosnia and Herzegovina) Kemal Buljubašić
- (Bosnia and Herzegovina) Rusmir Burek

== C ==
- (Bosnia and Herzegovina) Edin Cocalić
- (Bosnia and Herzegovina) Rusmir Cviko

== Č ==
- (Bosnia and Herzegovina) Benjamin Čolić
- (Bosnia and Herzegovina) Elvir Čolić
- (Bosnia and Herzegovina) Almir Čosić

== Ć ==
- (Bosnia and Herzegovina) Aldin Ćenan
- (Serbia) Milan Ćulum

== D ==
- (Senegal) Boubacar Dialiba
- (Croatia) (Bosnia and Herzegovina) Marijo Dodik
- (Bosnia and Herzegovina) Dejan Drakul
- (Bosnia and Herzegovina) Feđa Dudić
- (Bosnia and Herzegovina) Edin Dudo

== DŽ ==
- (Bosnia and Herzegovina) Edin Džeko (played at 2014 FIFA World Cup)

== Đ ==
- (Bosnia and Herzegovina) Ognjen Đelmić
- (Serbia) Ivan Đorić

== E ==
- (Bosnia and Herzegovina) Faris Efendić
- (Bosnia and Herzegovina) Kemal Elkaz

== F ==
- (Bosnia and Herzegovina) Nermin Fatić
- (Bosnia and Herzegovina) Adnan Fočić

== G ==
- (Bosnia and Herzegovina) Sahmir Garčević
- (North Macedonia) Goran Gančev
- (Bosnia and Herzegovina) Nudžein Geca
- (Liberia) Patrick Nyema Gerhardt
- (Hong Kong) (Bosnia and Herzegovina) Anto Grabo
- (Bosnia and Herzegovina) Branko Grahovac
- (Bosnia and Herzegovina) Almir Gredić
- (Bosnia and Herzegovina) Adnan Gušo
- (Bosnia and Herzegovina) Milan Gutović
- (Croatia) Jure Guvo

== H ==
- (Bosnia and Herzegovina) Emir Hadžić
- (Bosnia and Herzegovina) Sead Halilagić
- (Bosnia and Herzegovina) Kenan Hasagić
- (Bosnia and Herzegovina) Armin Hodžić
- (Bosnia and Herzegovina) Vlado Hrkać
- (Croatia) Ivica Huljev

== I ==
- (Bosnia and Herzegovina) Faruk Ihtijarević

== J ==
- (Bosnia and Herzegovina) Samir Jahić
- (Bosnia and Herzegovina) Sanel Jahić
- (North Macedonia) Adis Jahović
- (Bosnia and Herzegovina) Nermin Jamak
- (Bosnia and Herzegovina) Omer Joldić
- (Bosnia and Herzegovina) Nedim Jusufbegović
- (Australia) Aleksandar Jovanović

== K ==
- (Bosnia and Herzegovina) Admir Kajtaz
- (Bosnia and Herzegovina) Đorđe Kamber
- (Bosnia and Herzegovina) Sead Kapetanović
- (Croatia) Marin Karamarko
- (Bosnia and Herzegovina) Denis Karić
- (Bosnia and Herzegovina) Elvis Karić
- (Bosnia and Herzegovina) Suad Katana
- (Bosnia and Herzegovina) Zoran Kokot
- (Bosnia and Herzegovina) Miroslav Kružik
- (Bosnia and Herzegovina) Elmir Kuduzović
- (Bosnia and Herzegovina) Edin Kunić
- (Bosnia and Herzegovina) Alen Kurt
- (Bosnia and Herzegovina) Josip Kvesić

== L ==
- (Croatia) Ivan Lendrić
- (Bosnia and Herzegovina) Galib Lulo

== M ==
- (Bosnia and Herzegovina) Armin Mahović
- (Croatia) Vladimir Markotić
- (Serbia) Goran Marković
- (Bosnia and Herzegovina) Vladimir Marković
- (Bosnia and Herzegovina) Amar Mehić
- (Bosnia and Herzegovina) Nedim Mekić
- (Bosnia and Herzegovina) Samir Mekić
- (Bosnia and Herzegovina) Kerim Memija
- (Bosnia and Herzegovina) Jasmin Memišević
- (Bosnia and Herzegovina) Alen Mešanović
- (Bosnia and Herzegovina) Elvis Mešić
- (Bosnia and Herzegovina) Mirza Mešić
- (Bosnia and Herzegovina) Sanjin Mešić
- (Bosnia and Herzegovina) Nenad Mišković
- (Croatia) Denis Mudrinić
- (Bosnia and Herzegovina) Vedad Muftić
- (Bosnia and Herzegovina) Dino Muharemović
- (Bosnia and Herzegovina) Dželaludin Muharemović
- (Bosnia and Herzegovina) Edis Mulalić
- (Bosnia and Herzegovina) Adin Mulaosmanović
- (Bosnia and Herzegovina) Samir Muratović
- (Bosnia and Herzegovina) Adi Musli

== N ==
- (Bosnia and Herzegovina) Aleksandar Nikolić

== O ==
- (Bosnia and Herzegovina) Adis Obad
- (Bosnia and Herzegovina) Emir Obuća
- (Bosnia and Herzegovina) Amar Osim

== P ==
- (Bosnia and Herzegovina) Šaban Pehilj
- (Bosnia and Herzegovina) Adnan Pehlivanović
- (Bosnia and Herzegovina) Albin Pelak
- (Bosnia and Herzegovina) Sanjin Pintul
- (Serbia) Lazar Popović
- (Albania) Arsim Prepoli

== R ==
- (Bosnia and Herzegovina) Sanjin Radonja
- (Croatia) Božidar Radošević
- (Bosnia and Herzegovina) Igor Radovanović
- (Serbia) Mirko Radovanović
- (Montenegro) Mileta Radulović
- (Bosnia and Herzegovina) Aleksandar Railić
- (Bosnia and Herzegovina) Admir Raščić
- (Bosnia and Herzegovina) Haris Redžepi
- (Bosnia and Herzegovina) Damir Rovčanin

== S ==
- (Bosnia and Herzegovina) Srđan Savić
- (Bosnia and Herzegovina) Sead Seferović
- (Bosnia and Herzegovina) Mersad Selimbegović
- (Bosnia and Herzegovina) Nedžad Serdarević
- (Bosnia and Herzegovina) Mensur Sinanović
- (Bosnia and Herzegovina) Ilija Simić
- (Bosnia and Herzegovina) Dragutin Simić
- (Bosnia and Herzegovina) Ervin Smailagić
- (Bosnia and Herzegovina) Bajro Spahić
- (North Macedonia) Perica Stančeski
- (Croatia) Mario Stanić
- (Bosnia and Herzegovina) Srđan Stanić
- (Serbia) Siniša Stevanović
- (Bosnia and Herzegovina)

== Š ==
- (Bosnia and Herzegovina) Nermin Šabić
- (Bosnia and Herzegovina) Eldar Šehić
- (Bosnia and Herzegovina) Ibrahim Šehić
- (Bosnia and Herzegovina) Branko Šešlija
- (Bosnia and Herzegovina) Dalibor Šilić
- (Bosnia and Herzegovina) Predrag Šimić
- (Bosnia and Herzegovina) Edin Šopović
- (Bosnia and Herzegovina) Madžid Šošić
- (Bosnia and Herzegovina) Semir Štilić

== T ==
- (Bosnia and Herzegovina) Sergej Tica
- (Bosnia and Herzegovina) Tomislav Tomić
- (Bosnia and Herzegovina) Nedo Turković

== U ==
- (North Macedonia) Yani Urdinov
- (Serbia) Božidar Urošević
- (Serbia) Dejan Uzelac

== V ==
- (Argentina) Juan Manuel Varea
- (Bosnia and Herzegovina) Nermin Vazda
- (Bosnia and Herzegovina) Edin Višća (played at 2014 FIFA World Cup)
- (Bosnia and Herzegovina) Admir Vladavić
- (Bosnia and Herzegovina) Lillo Vojtović
- (Bosnia and Herzegovina) Avdija Vršajević (played at 2014 FIFA World Cup)
- (Slovenia) Muamer Vugdalić
- (Bosnia and Herzegovina) Sretko Vuksanović

== W ==
- (England) Neil Wood

== Z ==
- (Bosnia and Herzegovina) Zajko Zeba
- (Bosnia and Herzegovina) Mirza Zekić
- (Serbia) Mladen Zeljković
- (Bosnia and Herzegovina) Hadis Zubanović

== Ž ==
- (Bosnia and Herzegovina) Fadil Žerić
- (Bosnia and Herzegovina) Senad Žerić
- (Bosnia and Herzegovina) Denis Žerić

== Yugoslav period ==
=== A ===
- (Socialist Federal Republic of Yugoslavia) Kemal Alispahić
- (Socialist Federal Republic of Yugoslavia) Senad Arnautović
- (Socialist Federal Republic of Yugoslavia) Siniša Aškraba
- (Socialist Federal Republic of Yugoslavia) Šefik Azabagić

=== B ===
- (Socialist Federal Republic of Yugoslavia) Edin Bahtić
- (Socialist Federal Republic of Yugoslavia) Duško Bajić
- (Socialist Federal Republic of Yugoslavia) Šener Bajramović
- (Socialist Federal Republic of Yugoslavia) Mirsad Baljić
- (Socialist Federal Republic of Yugoslavia) Mehmed Baždarević
- (Socialist Federal Republic of Yugoslavia) Velija Bećirspahić
- (Socialist Federal Republic of Yugoslavia) Branislav Berjan
- (Socialist Federal Republic of Yugoslavia) Željko Biljuš
- (Socialist Federal Republic of Yugoslavia) Rade Bogdanović
- (Socialist Federal Republic of Yugoslavia) Boris Bračulj
- (Socialist Federal Republic of Yugoslavia) Blagoje Bratić
- (Socialist Federal Republic of Yugoslavia) Ivica Brzić
- (Socialist Federal Republic of Yugoslavia) Josip Bukal
- (Socialist Federal Republic of Yugoslavia) Risto Bukvić
- (Socialist Federal Republic of Yugoslavia) Ivica Baskarada

=== C ===
- (Socialist Federal Republic of Yugoslavia) Ivan Cvitanušić

=== Č ===
- (Socialist Federal Republic of Yugoslavia) Vlado Čapljić
- (Socialist Federal Republic of Yugoslavia) Josip Čilić

=== Ć ===
- (Socialist Federal Republic of Yugoslavia) Edin Ćurić

=== D ===
- (Socialist Federal Republic of Yugoslavia) Nedim Dautović
- (Socialist Federal Republic of Yugoslavia) Avdija Deraković
- (Socialist Federal Republic of Yugoslavia) Dimitrije Dimitrijević
- (Socialist Federal Republic of Yugoslavia) Hamo Dizdarević
- (Socialist Federal Republic of Yugoslavia) Zvonko Duspara

=== Đ ===
- (Socialist Federal Republic of Yugoslavia) Mustafa Đelilović
- (Socialist Federal Republic of Yugoslavia) Petar Đorđević
- (Socialist Federal Republic of Yugoslavia) Hajrudin Đurbuzović
- (Socialist Federal Republic of Yugoslavia) Ranko Đorđić
- (Socialist Federal Republic of Yugoslavia) Vidoje Đorđić

=== F ===
- (Socialist Federal Republic of Yugoslavia) Fahor Fazlagić

=== G ===
- (Socialist Federal Republic of Yugoslavia) Mirko Gašić
- (Socialist Federal Republic of Yugoslavia) Milan Gavrilović
- (Socialist Federal Republic of Yugoslavia) Anto Grabo
- (Socialist Federal Republic of Yugoslavia) Emir Grčić
- (Socialist Federal Republic of Yugoslavia) Goran Gutalj
- (Socialist Federal Republic of Yugoslavia) Milan Gutović

=== H ===
- (Socialist Federal Republic of Yugoslavia) Enver Hadžiabdić
- (Socialist Federal Republic of Yugoslavia) Edim Hadžialagić
- (Socialist Federal Republic of Yugoslavia) Tarik Hodžić
- (Socialist Federal Republic of Yugoslavia) Fahrija Hrvat

=== I ===
- (Socialist Federal Republic of Yugoslavia) Esad Ibrahimović
- (Socialist Federal Republic of Yugoslavia) Stojanče Idić
- (Socialist Federal Republic of Yugoslavia) Srećko Ilić
- (Socialist Federal Republic of Yugoslavia) Duško Ivanović

=== J ===
- (Socialist Federal Republic of Yugoslavia) Slobodan Janjuš
- (Socialist Federal Republic of Yugoslavia) Božo Janković
- (Socialist Federal Republic of Yugoslavia) Branimir Jelušić
- (Socialist Federal Republic of Yugoslavia) Dušan Jovanović
- (Socialist Federal Republic of Yugoslavia) Marjan Jugović

=== K ===
- (Socialist Federal Republic of Yugoslavia) Nusret Kadrić
- (Socialist Federal Republic of Yugoslavia) Ljubo Kalaba
- (Socialist Federal Republic of Yugoslavia) Josip Katalinski
- (Socialist Federal Republic of Yugoslavia) Rudolf Kinčić
- (Socialist Federal Republic of Yugoslavia) Dragan Kojović
- (Socialist Federal Republic of Yugoslavia) Slobodan Kojović
- (Socialist Federal Republic of Yugoslavia) Vladimir Kojović
- (Socialist Federal Republic of Yugoslavia) Kasim Kokot
- (Socialist Federal Republic of Yugoslavia) Vlatko Konjevod
- (Socialist Federal Republic of Yugoslavia) Stevica Krsmanović
- (Socialist Federal Republic of Yugoslavia) Simo Krunić
- (Socialist Federal Republic of Yugoslavia) Sulejman Kulović

=== L ===
- (Socialist Federal Republic of Yugoslavia) Lazar Lemić
- (Socialist Federal Republic of Yugoslavia) Franjo Lovrić
- (Socialist Federal Republic of Yugoslavia) Ivan Lušić

=== M ===
- (Socialist Federal Republic of Yugoslavia) Slavko Mamuzić
- (Socialist Federal Republic of Yugoslavia) Rade Matić
- (Socialist Federal Republic of Yugoslavia) Zoran Matković
- (Socialist Federal Republic of Yugoslavia) Almir Memić
- (Socialist Federal Republic of Yugoslavia) Radmilo Mihajlović
- (Socialist Federal Republic of Yugoslavia) Vitomir Milošević
- (Socialist Federal Republic of Yugoslavia) Fikret Mujkić
- (Socialist Federal Republic of Yugoslavia) Midhat Mujkić

=== N ===
- (Socialist Federal Republic of Yugoslavia) Nikola Nikić
- (Socialist Federal Republic of Yugoslavia) Siniša Nikolić

=== O ===
- (Socialist Federal Republic of Yugoslavia) Milomir Odović
- (Socialist Federal Republic of Yugoslavia) Nedžad Omerhodžić
- (Socialist Federal Republic of Yugoslavia) Ivica Osim

=== P ===
- (Socialist Federal Republic of Yugoslavia) Rade Paprica
- (Socialist Federal Republic of Yugoslavia) Zoran Paprica
- (Socialist Federal Republic of Yugoslavia) Ilijas Pašić
- (Socialist Federal Republic of Yugoslavia) Željko Pavlović
- (Socialist Federal Republic of Yugoslavia) Ivica Pekić
- (Socialist Federal Republic of Yugoslavia) Ranko Planinić
- (Socialist Federal Republic of Yugoslavia) Dragan Popadić
- (Socialist Federal Republic of Yugoslavia) Neđo Prelo

=== R ===
- (Socialist Federal Republic of Yugoslavia) Vladan Radača
- (Socialist Federal Republic of Yugoslavia) Ivan Radić
- (Socialist Federal Republic of Yugoslavia) Miloš Radović
- (Socialist Federal Republic of Yugoslavia) Vasilije Radović
- (Socialist Federal Republic of Yugoslavia) Milan Ribar
- (Socialist Federal Republic of Yugoslavia) Željko Rodić

=== S ===
- (Socialist Federal Republic of Yugoslavia) Hajrudin Saračević
- (Socialist Federal Republic of Yugoslavia) Dušan Simić
- (Socialist Federal Republic of Yugoslavia) Zoran Slišković
- (Socialist Federal Republic of Yugoslavia) Drago Smajlović
- (Socialist Federal Republic of Yugoslavia) Đuro Smajlović
- (Socialist Federal Republic of Yugoslavia) Zoran Samardžija
- (Socialist Federal Republic of Yugoslavia) Edin Sprečo
- (Socialist Federal Republic of Yugoslavia) Dragiša Stojanović

=== Š ===
- (Socialist Federal Republic of Yugoslavia) Refik Šabanadžović
- (Socialist Federal Republic of Yugoslavia) Džemaludin Šerbo
- (Socialist Federal Republic of Yugoslavia) Josip Šimović
- (Socialist Federal Republic of Yugoslavia) Haris Škoro
- (Socialist Federal Republic of Yugoslavia) Dragan Škrba
- (Socialist Federal Republic of Yugoslavia) Miljan Štaka
- (Socialist Federal Republic of Yugoslavia) Slobodan Šujica

=== T ===
- (Socialist Federal Republic of Yugoslavia) Ilija Tojagić

=== V ===
- (Socialist Federal Republic of Yugoslavia) Jasminko Velić
- (Socialist Federal Republic of Yugoslavia) Nedžad Verlašević
- (Socialist Federal Republic of Yugoslavia) (Belgium) Gordan Vidović
- (Socialist Federal Republic of Yugoslavia) Dragomir Vlaški

=== Z ===
- (Socialist Federal Republic of Yugoslavia) Anto Zečević
- (Socialist Federal Republic of Yugoslavia) Josip Zemko

=== Ž ===
- (Socialist Federal Republic of Yugoslavia) Marcel Žigante
