= Rade Bogdanović =

Serbian footballer (born 1970)

Personal information
- Date of birth: 21 May 1970 (age 56)
- Place of birth: Sarajevo, SFR Yugoslavia
- Height: 1.85 m (6 ft 1 in)
- Position: Striker

Youth career
- 1982–1987: Željezničar

Senior career*
Years	Team	Apps	(Gls)
1988–1992	Željezničar	75	(4)
1992–1996	Pohang Atoms	120	(45)
1997	JEF United Ichihara	16	(8)
1997–1998	Atlético Madrid	14	(6)
1998	→ NAC Breda (loan)	13	(5)
1998–2002	Werder Bremen	56	(15)
2002–2003	Arminia Bielefeld	19	(0)
2003–2004	Al Wahda	0	(0)
Total		313	(83)

International career
1997	FR Yugoslavia	3	(2)
- * Club domestic league appearances and goals

Rade Bogdanović (Serbian Cyrillic: Раде Богдановић; born 21 May 1970) is a Serbian football pundit and former professional player who played as a striker.

== Early life ==
Born in Sarajevo to a father employed as a driver at Energoinvest and a homemaker mother, Bogdanović was raised in the village of Tilava on the city outskirts. He attended the Radojka Lakić Primary School in the Vraca neighbourhood and was a fan of Hajduk Split in his youth.

=== Youth football at Željezničar ===
Bogdanović began playing organized football at the age of twelve, getting invited to try out for hometown side Željezničar's youth system in June 1982 after being noticed at a local primary school tournament by the club scout and former goalkeeper Ruda Bulić. After passing the tryout, Bogdanović was attached to the Željezničar cadet (under-16) squad coached by Duško Bajić; among the youngsters joining the club's youth system at the same time was Goran Gutalj.

Progressing up the age groups within Željezničar's youth system, Bogdanović was coached by Josip Bukal, then Sulejman Kulović, and finally Vasilije "Čiko" Radović.

By spring 1987, the teenager was set to make his full squad debut away at NK Osijek on 24 May 1987 due to the team's established defensive midfielder Edin Ćurić serving a one-match suspension for an accumulation of yellow cards. However, a medial collateral ligament (MCL) injury—sustained four days earlier during the SR Bosnia-Herzegovina provincial youth (under-18) cup final versus FK Sarajevo under-18s—forced Bogdanović into a six-month layoff that included surgery followed by months of regaining match fitness.

== Club career ==
=== Željezničar ===
Recovered from knee injury and surgery, teenage Bogdanović was attached to the Željezničar full squad under manager Blagoje Bratić in January 1988, joining players such as Dragan Škrba, Branislav Berjan, Mirsad Baljić, Vlado Komšić, Edin Bahtić, Edin Ćurić, Zoran Slišković, Edim Hadžialagić, Radmilo Mihajlović, and Milan Pavlović with the team stuck in the bottom half of the table throughout the league season. Three years removed from their storied UEFA Cup run—with goalkeeper Škrba, full backs Berjan and Baljić, midfielder Ćurić, returnee midfielder Bahtić, and forward Mihajlović as the holdovers from the great season—Željezničar were struggling to replicate that success.

The seventeen-year-old defensive midfielder was given his debut on 27 March 1988 at Titograd's Pod Goricom Stadium in a Yugoslav First League match away at Budućnost. Entering the contest in the 65th minute with visiting Željezničar up 0-1, Bogdanović was brought on in an effort of protecting the lead, however, the match ended 1-1 as Dejan Savićević tied the score for the home team. One week after making his league debut in Titograd, the youngster was given a start by coach Bratić at home versus Hajduk and managed to score a spectacular goal, Željo's third, on Hajduk's goalie Zoran Varvodić as the rampant Željezničar squad routed the struggling visitors 3-0.

Over the summer 1988 transfer window, head coach Bratić got replaced by his assistant Josip Bukal as Željezničar underwent a squad overhaul with the team's twenty-three-year-old star striker Mihajlović sold to Dinamo Zagreb, its best defender—twenty-six-year-old left back Baljić—sold to FC Sion, and its thirty-four-year-old veteran right back Berjan moving on to Karlstad BK in the Sweden second division after fourteen seasons at Grbavica. The departures opened up more space for the team's youth system prospects—including Bogdanović, Suvad Katana, Siniša Nikolić, Srećko Ilić, and Mario Stanić—who had already been set to start getting regular first team opportunities. The offseason also saw the return to the club of the thirty-two-year-old fan-favourite veteran Nikola Nikić after four seasons abroad as well as the acquisition of young winger Simo Krunić from the Second League team Famos Hrasnica.

In 1990, twenty-year-old Bogdanović got called up to serve his mandatory Yugoslav People's Army (JNA) service. Serving in Belgrade at the Topčider barracks as part of the sporting company, a unit formed for professional athletes, among the athletes serving at the same time was Vladan Milojević, a Red Star Belgrade prospect who would go on to a notable head coaching career. As a result of being in the army, Bogdanović missed the entire 1990-91 league season.

After one of these training sessions [with the FK Partizan squad] at the JNA Stadium in Belgrade, Goran [Gutalj] and myself got approached by a guy named Fakrija Šekularac asking us if we’d be interested in transferring to the Korean league. Now, this guy—known around town as Šeki—would later become a pretty established football agent, but at this point he’s basically a local hustler and amateur boxer who hangs around football players. So, he starts throwing these fantastical monetary figures at us while my bullshit detector is going off incessantly. However, seeing that, at this point, I’m a war refugee with DM200 to my name, I’m thinking: ’Even if 90% of the numbers he’s tossing around are nothing but fiction, I’m still happy with the remaining 10%’.

— Bogdanović on the circumstances of his 1992 transfer to Korea.

Bogdanović stayed at Grbavica until April 1992, fleeing Sarajevo as the Bosnian War broke out. The twenty-two-year-old fled to Belgrade along with several other Željezničar first team players such as Simo Krunić, Gordan Vidović, Suvad Katana, Siniša Nikolić, Srećko Ilić, and Jasminko Velić. Once in Serbia, they were accommodated by the FK Partizan technical director Nenad Bjeković and general secretary Žarko Zečević who took care of the players' basic living needs by putting them up at Hotel Mladost near the Banjica forest while allowing them to take part in FK Partizan's training sessions in order to maintain fitness while looking for new clubs. Within months, Krunić started playing with OFK Beograd, Nikolić found a club in Portuguese lower divisions, Ilić moved to Slovenian NK Mura, Gutalj also eventually ended up at Mura after not passing his trial in Korea while Katana ended up at K.R.C. Genk in Belgium and Vidović moved to Switzerland's FC St. Gallen.

=== South Korea ===
Though having a verbal agreement with Bjeković about signing with FK Partizan ahead of the upcoming season, in June 1992, Bogdanović moved to the Far East, joining the South Korean club POSCO Atoms from Pohang midway through the 1992 K League season. Initially arriving on a month-long trial, Bogdanović appeared in eight competitive matches before the Pohang Iron and Steel Company-owned club offered him a full contract, which he accepted. The terms of his deal in Korea included receiving a US$120,000 advance along with a US$5,000 monthly salary plus achievement-based bonuses.

Playing in the modest league consisting of only six teams, he quickly established himself as one of its best players. Though spending the initial four years of his professional career in the Yugoslav First League with Željezničar as a defensive midfielder, Bogdanović started being deployed as a striker upon arriving to Korea. With the Yugoslav up front and twenty-three-year-old Korean rising star Hong Myung-bo in defence, POSCO Atoms edged out Ilhwa Chunma from Seongnam to win the 1992 K League title.

At the end of the 1994 K League season, Bogdanović made the league top eleven squad as the best forward in the competition.

After completing the 1996 K League season in early November 1996 as the Pohang Steelers failed to qualify for the league championship playoff, Bogdanović signed with the Japanese J.League side JEF United Ichihara for the following season. Before leaving the Pohang Steelers for good, he played for the team at the start of the 1996–97 Asian Club Championship in late November 1996.

=== Japan and failed transfer to Ajax ===
In mid-November 1996, after spending four and a half seasons at Pohang, Bogdanović signed with the Japanese club JEF United Ichihara from Chiba, citing better pay and higher level of competition in the Japanese league as motivation for the move. Bidding his farewell to Pohang upon appearing in three round-robin matches at the start of the 1996–97 Asian Club Championship, he went back home to Belgrade to await the commencement of the upcoming J.League season.

While in Belgrade, the player received a dream offer from Louis van Gaal's Ajax, reigning Dutch champions and Champions League finalists. Traveling to Amsterdam with his wife, along with the Serbian sports journalist Mile Vjetrović who was brought along for translation, Bogdanović met with van Gaal and was one of the guests of the club for its league derby match versus PSV Eindhoven on 22 December 1996 at the recently opened Amsterdam Arena. Seeing it as a chance to finally come back to Europe, the twenty-six-year-old Yugoslav decided to sign for the Amsterdam club in late December 1996 without making them aware that he had already committed to JEF. After signing a preliminary agreement with Ajax, Bogdanović arrived at the Dutch team for a January 1997 trial that included joining their winter training in La Manga, Spain during the Eredivisie winter break. Bogdanović was hoping for a compensation agreement with JEF that would allow him to go stay with Ajax's talented squad featuring Edwin van der Sar, Danny Blind, Winston Bogarde, de Boer brothers (Frank and Ronald), Richard Witschge, Marc Overmars, Tijani Babangida, Jari Litmanen, and Patrick Kluivert, but the UEFA arbitration committee got involved and the twenty-six-year-old was forced to honour the contract he had signed in Japan. Unbeknownst to Bogdanović at the time, while training with Ajax in La Manga, he was noticed by the Atlético Madrid assistant coach Rešad Kunovac who was there on a scouting trip assessing the Dutch team, his club's next opponent at the upcoming Champions League quarterfinals.

Begrudgingly going back to the Far East, Bogdanović spent five months with JEF alongside compatriot Nenad Maslovar, playing the first part of the 1997 J1 League season.

=== Return to Europe: Atlético Madrid, Breda loan ===
During summer 1997, Bogdanović's wish of returning to Europe finally came true as compatriot Radomir Antić signed him to a contract with the Spanish club Atlético Madrid on a squad featuring fellow Yugoslavs Milinko Pantić and Veljko Paunović—along with a slew of high-profile players such as the expensive new signings Christian Vieri and Juninho Paulista, additional new signings Daniel Prodan, Andrei Frascarelli, Jordi Lardín, José Mari, and veteran returnee Paulo Futre as well as established holdovers from the club's league-and-cup-winning double two seasons earlier Kiko, Toni Muñoz, José Luis Caminero, Santi Denia, José Francisco Molina, and Juan Vizcaíno. Arriving to Madrid, Bogdanović's living accommodations were taken care by the club that arranged for him to move into the apartment owned by Diego Simeone who had just gotten sold to Inter Milan. Moving into the apartment complex, Bogdanović became neighbours with fellow Yugoslav professional athlete, basketball player Dejan Bodiroga, who had been playing for Real Madrid Baloncesto.

Bogdanović's transfer to Atlético was the fourth most expensive of 1997, after those of Ronaldo, Rivaldo and Atlético's own signing of Vieri, costing the equivalent of €17.4 million. Bogdanović said that his contract had said that he had left JEF United for US$2 million, but Atlético Madrid president Jesús Gil vastly inflated the fee due to money laundering. Gil, who died in 2004, was convicted of financial crimes relating to the club.

After not being included in the squad for the opening day of the league season away at Real Madrid, Bogdanović made his debut in the week 2, partnering Kiko up front at home versus Real Valladolid on 6 September 1997 and scoring two first half goals as los Colchoneros routed the visitors 5–0 by the end. The dream start prompted Atlético's impulsive president Jesús Gil to buy him a brand new BMW 316i as a reward. However, the presence of Vieri and Kiko meant few playing opportunities for Bogdanović: in the very next league match, 1-0 away loss at Athletic Bilbao, he was reduced to only twelve minutes of action plus injury time, coming on for Vieri in the 78nd minute, followed by four league contests completely out of the matchday lineup.

Bogdanović would reappear in late October 1997 for a 0-2 home loss versus Espanyol with another full 90 minute performance next to Kiko as Vieri was given a rest by head coach Antić following the Italian's UEFA Cup hat-trick versus PAOK four days earlier. With Atlético taking a 5-2 advantage into the return leg in Thessaloniki, Vieri was again rested by Antić while Bogdanović started and got a goal in the high-scoring contest that ended 4-4, his very first European continental club match.

Back on La Liga front, Vieri got injured minutes into the next league match, at home versus relegation-battlers Compostela, with Bogdanović coming on and scoring before making way for Vizcaíno at halftime. Due to Vieri's injury, Bogdanović would continue as a starter for the following five league matches, a period during which the Yugoslav scored twice. Vieri returned from injury in mid December 1997 as the fourth-placed los Colchoneros were taking on Mallorca and immediately got his starting centre forward assignment back, but could manage only 45 minutes as Antić sent on Bogdanović at halftime with the visitors leading 1-2—within minutes of entering, the Yugoslav tied the score 2-2, but Mallorca still managed to win by the end 2-3. Three days later, with Vieri still not fully recovered, Bogdanović began the league match versus league-leaders FC Barcelona at Camp Nou in front of 80,000 spectators before being subbed off fifteen minutes into the second half with the score tied at 1-1; Barça won 3-1 by the end, dropping Atlético to sixth in the table.

By early January 1998, Vieri was fully match fit again and Bogdanović was back to getting the Italian's leftover minutes. In the wake of picking up an injury that forced him to leave the mid January 1998 league match away at Valladolid before halftime, and a diagnosis by the Atlético medical staff that he would be out of action for at least six months, the Yugoslav accepted a loan out to Dutch NAC Breda for the remainder of the season in order to free up a spot on the Atlético's roster for another attacking player, Avi Nimni, to be registered.

=== Werder Bremen ===
After playing out the 1997–98 season on loan in Eredivisie, Bogdanović came back to Atlético in summer 1998. As a consequence of finishing the preceding La Liga season in disappointing 7th spot, the Madrid club management undertook a major squad rebuilding effort during the offseason with coach Radomir Antić fired and Arrigo Sacchi brought in. The coaching change was accompanied with a host of changes in player personnel such as superstar Vieri being sold to Lazio and Italian defenders Michele Serena and Stefano Torrisi being brought in from Fiorentina and Bologna, respectively in addition to defensive Yugoslav midfielders Vladimir Jugović and Zoran Njeguš from Lazio and Red Star Belgrade, respectively. With a focus on defensive tactics, Bogdanović was adjudged as surplus to requirements by Sacchi and sold to Werder Bremen for a fee around €1,350,000.

==== 1998-99 season ====
Bogdanović made his Bremen debut in Bundesliga on 19 September 1998 away at VfL Wolfsburg, scoring a goal in a 2-4 win.

In December 2000, he was banned from playing for six months after having been ruled to have spit Hansa Rostock's goalkeeper Martin Pieckenhagen in the face during Werder's 5–2 defeat.

He stayed at the German club for four years, winning the 1998–99 DFB-Pokal and the 1998 UEFA Intertoto Cup. In the cup final against Bayern Munich, Bogdanović came on as a substitute and then scored one of the penalties in the shootout as Bremen emerged victorious.

=== Later years and retirement ===
In the 2002–03 season, he played for Arminia Bielefeld, and then went to Al Wahda from the United Arab Emirates. After that, he decided to retire from professional football.

== International career ==
Bogdanović played three times and scored two goals for the FR Yugoslavia national team. He was asked to play for the Bosnia and Herzegovina national team, but he chose to play for FR Yugoslavia (Serbia and Montenegro).

== Post-playing ==
Bogdanović tried his hand at and football administration with a few low-profile stints, most notably at Rad and BASK.

Since early 2011, he owns and runs a sports recreation facility, named Posco Arena after his Korean team, in the Belgrade neighbourhood of Careva Ćuprija.

=== Corruption claims ===
Since retiring from playing football, Bogdanović made a number of public allegations about various past instances of corruption he claims to have witnessed during his career as a professional footballer.

==== 1998 Atlético Madrid match-fixing ====
In a April 2011 interview for the Belgrade-based daily newspaper Sport, Bogdanović caused retroactive controversy by alleging that Atlético Madrid's last match of the 1997–98 La Liga season on 15 May 1998 away at Racing Santander was fixed by Atlético president Jesús Gil "because Atlético needed three points to ensure a UEFA Cup spot for the following season". Bogdanović stated: "Gil walked into the dressing room before the match and said that each player has to set aside DM25,000 out of the DM150,000 bonus in order for the win to be bought".

The match ended 0–1 for the Madrid visitors.

==== FR Yugoslavia national team 1998 FIFA World Cup pay-to-play scheme ====
Without naming specific individuals, in various print interviews throughout mid-to-late 2010s (some 20 years after the alleged event), retired footballer Bogdanović has made claims about having been offered a spot on the Yugoslavia 1998 FIFA World Cup roster in exchange for paying DM50,000 as part of an alleged pay to play scheme: "After my [summer 1997] Atlético transfer, which I had completed without an agent, I got a call from a well-known Yugoslav coach who had gotten my number through [Atlético head coach] Radomir Antić. This person was most curious as to why I don't handle my business through an agent, basically telling me 'congrats on going from Japan to Atlético and your good run of form, son, but this is not how these things are done: why don't you look into getting yourself an agent and then you can be with us [at the national team]'. Then, ten months later, in April 1998, I got approached by a Yugoslav sports journalist who explained to me that his son is a schoolmate of [Yugoslav FA general-secretary] Bato Bulatović's son. We met up at a restaurant in Skadarlija where this journalist told me he can absolutely guarantee a spot on the upcoming Yugoslavia [1998] World Cup roster for me if I agree to pay DM50,000 before proceeding to name-drop all the players he had already gotten into the national team as well as the players who would supposedly be on the upcoming World Cup roster through him. I refused the offer, but, sure enough, then I saw that the individuals he mentioned did later end up playing for the national team [at the World Cup]. One of the [Yugoslav] players taken to that World Cup hadn't even played for the national team before then."

=== TV punditry ===
From the mid 2010s, Bogdanović began appearing as in-studio pundit/analyst on Serbian television during football coverage. He quickly marked himself out for outspoken approach and off-the-cuff manner.

In November 2019, Bogdanović faced criticism over a racist remark made during RTS' Champions League live coverage. Commenting on poor defending by Borussia Dortmund in a Champions League match against FC Barcelona, he remarked that the German team had never recovered from their manager Lucien Favre's past decision to "play with four blacks in the defensive back line towards the end of the previous Bundesliga season". During the coverage of the same game, Bogdanović further commented on Barcelona's €150 million signing Ousmane Dembélé's time at the Catalan club by claiming that "the Barcelona people hired a nutritionist for the kid to explain to him that he shouldn't be eating fast food before hiring a psychiatrist for him to make him aware that watching porn and organizing online gaming tournaments until early morning isn't a proper lifestyle for a professional footballer" before adding that "the renovation of the Clinical Centre of Serbia costs as much as this guy".

During the 2026 FIFA World Cup coverage on RTS, Bogdanović aroused more controversy with another contentious racial remark, stating after the Belgium vs. Iran group stage match while commenting on Belgium's centre back Nathan Ngoy's 66th minute straight red card that "black players don't posses the focus required for more than 60-to-80 minutes of [disciplined] football". The following day, in response to the negative reaction his remark had caused, he issued a press release apologizing for what he said.

As part of his halftime analysis of the France vs. England 2026 FIFA World Cup third-place match, Bogdanović launched into an on-air broadside against the RTS match commentator Nemanja Matić, referring to the commentator insultingly as a "football ignoramus who just raped us for 45 minutes with his ignorance" as part of Bogdanović's overall rebuke of Matić for "[having the audacity] to comment on [football] tactics despite having never played the sport".

== Personal life ==
Bogdanović and his wife Aleksandra have three daughters: Kristina (born 1 June 1994 in South Korea), Marija (born 17 October 2000 in Germany), and Sofija (born 26 July 2007 in Spain). Bogdanović and his family reside in Belgrade though they also spend time in Mallorca where he owns an apartment.

Bogdanović's nephews Vladimir Jovančić and Darko Jovančić are also football players.

== Career statistics ==
=== Club ===
Appearances and goals by club, season and competition
Club	Season	League			Cup		League Cup		Continental		Total	
Club	Season	Division	Apps	Goals	Apps	Goals	Apps	Goals	Apps	Goals	Apps	Goals
Željezničar	1987–88	Yugoslav First League	13	2			—				13	2
Željezničar	1988–89	Yugoslav First League	20	1			—				20	1
Željezničar	1989–90	Yugoslav First League	10	1			—				10	1
Željezničar	1990–91	Yugoslav First League	19	0			—				19	0
Željezničar	1991–92	Yugoslav First League	18	0			—				18	0
Željezničar	Total		80	4			—				80	4
Pohang Atoms (Note: POSCO Atoms until 1995)	1992	K-League	12	2	—		5	1			17	3
Pohang Atoms	1993	K-League	25	8	—		2	1			27	9
Pohang Atoms	1994	K-League	27	18	—		6	4			33	22
Pohang Atoms	1995	K-League	24	6	—		7	2			31	8
Pohang Atoms	1996	K-League	32	11	—		7	2			39	13
Pohang Atoms	Total		120	45	—		27	10			147	55
JEF United Ichihara	1997	J1 League	16	8	0	0	6	8	—		22	16
Atlético Madrid	1997–98	La Liga	14	6	1	0	—		3	1	18	7
NAC Breda	1997–98	Eredivisie	13	5							13	5
Werder Bremen	1998–99	Bundesliga	23	8	4	0	—		—		27	8
Werder Bremen	1999–2000	Bundesliga	22	4	2	0	2	0	5	3	31	7
Werder Bremen	2000–01	Bundesliga	11	3	1	1	—		4	0	16	4
Werder Bremen	2001–02	Bundesliga	—		—		—		—		—	
Werder Bremen	Total		56	15	7	1	2	0	9	3	74	19
Arminia Bielefeld	2002–03	Bundesliga	19	0	2	1	—		—		21	1
Career total			318	83	10	2	35	18	12	4	375	107

=== International ===
Appearances and goals by national team and year
National team	Year	Apps	Goals
FR Yugoslavia	1997	3	2
Total		3	2

Scores and results list FR Yugoslavia's goal tally first, score column indicates score after each Bogdanović goal.

List of international goals scored by Rade Bogdanović
No.	Date	Venue	Opponent	Score	Result	Competition
1	12 June 1997	Seoul, South Korea	Ghana	2–1	3–1	1997 Korea Cup
2	12 June 1997	Seoul, South Korea	Ghana	3–1	3–1	1997 Korea Cup

== Honours ==
=== Player ===
Pohang Atoms

- K League 1: 1992
- Korean FA Cup: 1996
- Korean League Cup: 1993

Werder Bremen

- DFB-Pokal: 1998–99
- UEFA Intertoto Cup: 1998 (Joint Winner)

=== Individual ===
Awards

- K League Top Assists Award: 1996
- K League Best XI: 1994, 1996

Performance

- Korean League Cup top scorer: 1994
