= List of Bosnia and Herzegovina football first tier top scorers =

The top tier in Bosnia and Herzegovina football today is the Premier League, replacing the First League for the 2000–01 inaugural season. Nemanja Bilbija holds the record for most scored goals in a season, 33, scored in the 2021–22 season while playing for Zrinjski Mostar. Mersudin Ahmetović has scored the fewest goals as top goalscorer, scoring 13 in the 2019–20 season while a part of Sarajevo.

== Top scorers ==
=== By season ===
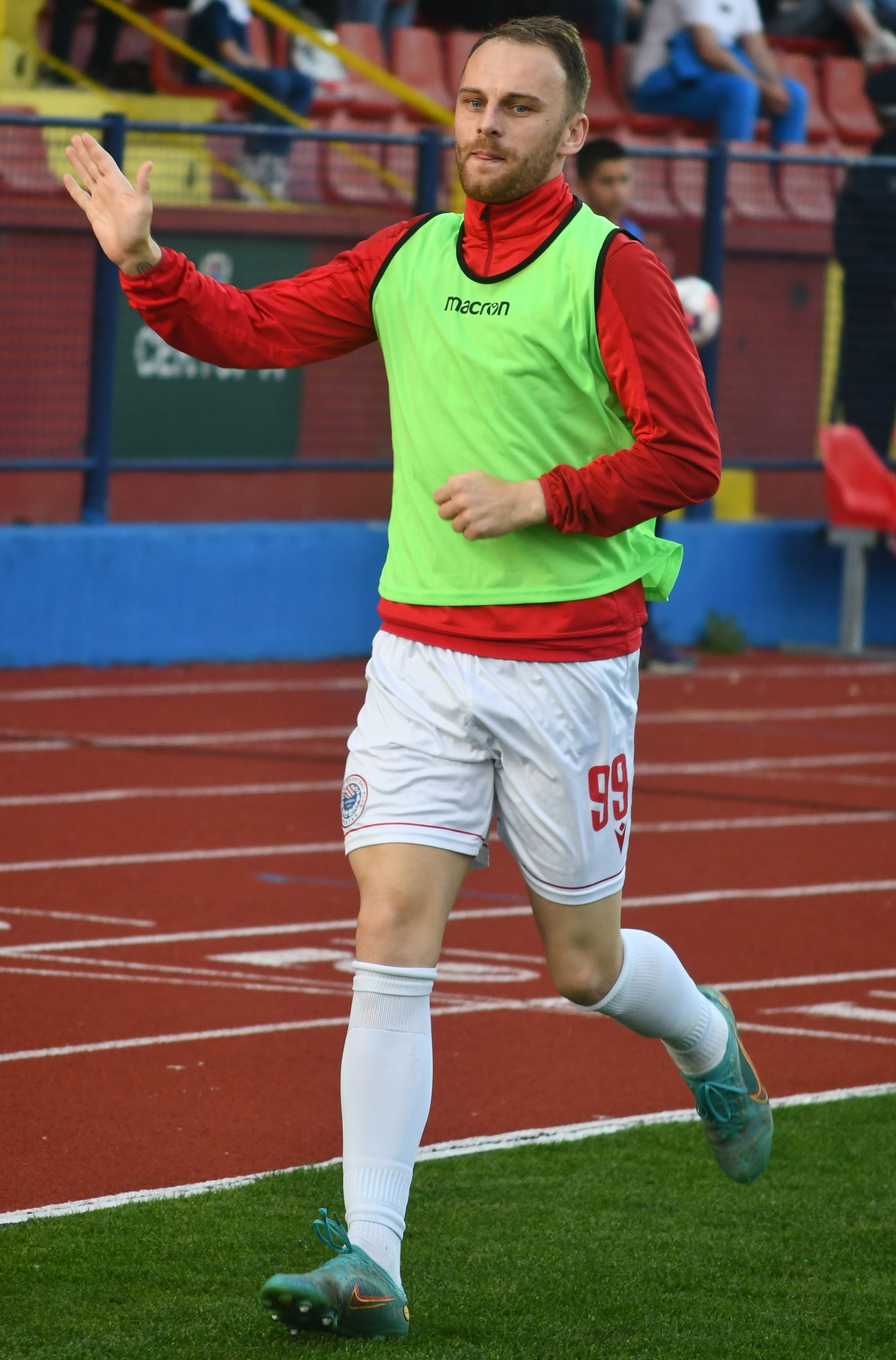
Nemanja Bilbija holds the record for most scored goals in a season, 33 for Zrinjski Mostar in the 2021–22 season

Key
| Player (X) | Name of the player and number of times they were top scorer at that point (if more than one) |
| ^{†} | Indicates multiple top scorers in the same season |
| § | Denotes the club were champions in the same season |

| Season | Player(s) | Nationality | Club(s) | Goals |
|---|---|---|---|---|
| 1995–96 | Amir Osmanović | Bosnia and Herzegovina | Radnički Lukavac | 27 |
| 1996–97 | Nermin Vazda | Bosnia and Herzegovina | Bosna Visoko | 17 |
| 1997–98^{†} | Nermin Hajdarević | Bosnia and Herzegovina | Čelik Zenica | 19 |
| 1997–98^{†} | Nermin Vazda (2) | Bosnia and Herzegovina | Željezničar | 19 |
| 1998–99 | Nermin Vazda (3) | Bosnia and Herzegovina | Željezničar | 18 |
| 1999–2000 | Džemo Smječanin | Bosnia and Herzegovina | Đerzelez | 25 |
| 1999–2000 | Mirsad Džafić | Bosnia and Herzegovina | Velež Mostar | 25 |
| 2000–01 | Dželaludin Muharemović | Bosnia and Herzegovina | Željezničar | 31 |
| 2001–02 | Ivica Huljev | Croatia | Željezničar | 15 |
| 2002–03 | Emir Obuća | Bosnia and Herzegovina | Sarajevo | 24 |
| 2003–04 | Alen Škoro | Bosnia and Herzegovina | Sarajevo | 20 |
| 2004–05 | Zoran Rajović | Serbia | Zrinjski Mostar | 17 |
| 2005–06 | Petar Jelić | Bosnia and Herzegovina | Modriča | 19 |
| 2006–07 | Stevo Nikolić | Bosnia and Herzegovina | Modriča | 19 |
| 2006–07 | Dragan Benić | Bosnia and Herzegovina | Borac Banja Luka | 19 |
| 2007–08 | Darko Spalević | Serbia | Slavija Sarajevo | 18 |
| 2008–09 | Darko Spalević (2) | Serbia | Slavija Sarajevo | 17 |
| 2009–10 | Feđa Dudić | Bosnia and Herzegovina | Travnik | 16 |
| 2010–11 | Ivan Lendrić | Croatia | Zrinjski Mostar | 16 |
| 2011–12 | Eldin Adilović | Bosnia and Herzegovina | Željezničar | 19 |
| 2012–13 | Emir Hadžić | Bosnia and Herzegovina | Sarajevo | 20 |
| 2013–14 | Wagner | Brazil | Široki Brijeg | 18 |
| 2014–15 | Riad Bajić | Bosnia and Herzegovina | Željezničar | 15 |
| 2015–16 | Leon Benko | Croatia | Sarajevo | 17 |
| 2016–17 | Ivan Lendrić (2) | Croatia | Željezničar | 19 |
| 2017–18 | Miloš Filipović | Serbia | Zrinjski Mostar | 16 |
| 2018–19 | Sulejman Krpić | Bosnia and Herzegovina | Željezničar | 16 |
| 2019–20 | Mersudin Ahmetović | Bosnia and Herzegovina | Sarajevo | 13 |
| 2020–21 | Nemanja Bilbija | Bosnia and Herzegovina | Zrinjski Mostar | 17 |
| 2021–22 | Nemanja Bilbija (2) | Bosnia and Herzegovina | Zrinjski Mostar | 33 |
| 2022–23 | Nemanja Bilbija (3) | Bosnia and Herzegovina | Zrinjski Mostar | 24 |
| 2023–24 | Nemanja Bilbija (4) | Bosnia and Herzegovina | Zrinjski Mostar | 24 |
| 2024–25 | Mihael Mlinarić | Croatia | Velež Mostar | 19 |
| 2025–26 | Luka Juričić | Bosnia and Herzegovina | Borac Banja Luka | 27 |

=== By club ===
| Rank | Club | Titles | Seasons |
|---|---|---|---|
| 1 | Željezničar | 8 | 1997–98, 1998–99, 2000–01, 2001–02, 2011–12, 2014–15, 2016–17, 2018–19 |
| 2 | Zrinjski Mostar | 7 | 2004–05, 2010–11, 2017–18, 2020–21, 2021–22, 2022–23, 2023–24 |
| 3 | Sarajevo | 5 | 2002–03, 2003–04, 2012–13, 2015–16, 2019–20 |
| 4 | Modriča | 2 | 2005–06, 2006–07 |
| 4 | Slavija Sarajevo | 2 | 2007–08, 2008–09 |
| 4 | Velež Mostar | 2 | 1999–2000, 2024–25 |
| 4 | Borac Banja Luka | 2 | 2006–07, 2025–26 |
| 8 | Radnički Lukavac | 1 | 1995–96 |
| 8 | Bosna Visoko | 1 | 1996–97 |
| 8 | Čelik Zenica | 1 | 1997–98 |
| 8 | Đerzelez | 1 | 1999–2000 |
| 8 | Travnik | 1 | 2009–10 |
| 8 | Široki Brijeg | 1 | 2013–14 |

=== By nationality ===
| Country | Titles |
|---|---|
| Bosnia and Herzegovina | 23 |
| Croatia | 5 |
| Serbia | 4 |
| Brazil | 1 |

== See also ==
- Premier League of Bosnia and Herzegovina
- First League of Bosnia and Herzegovina
