= Enver Hadžiabdić =

Bosnian football manager (born 1945)

Personal information
- Date of birth: 6 November 1945 (age 81)
- Place of birth: Belgrade, DF Yugoslavia
- Height: 1.74 m (5 ft 9 in)
- Position: Defender

Youth career
- Iskra Bugojno
- Bratstvo Travnik

Senior career*
Years	Team	Apps	(Gls)
1965–1974	Željezničar	237	(1)
1974–1977	Charleroi	77	(1)
1977–1979	Velež Mostar	62	(7)
1979–1980	AEL	24	(3)
Total		400	(12)

International career
1970–1974	Yugoslavia	11	(0)

Managerial career
- 1994: Iran Olympic team
- 1995–1997: Al-Rayyan (youth)
- 1998–1999: Željezničar
- 1999–2000: Željezničar
- 2002–2003: Tirana
- 2007–2008: Željezničar
- * Club domestic league appearances and goals

Enver Hadžiabdić (born 6 November 1945) is a Bosnian former football manager and player, best known for playing for and later managing Željezničar.

Hadžiabdić is the only person in Željezničar history to have won league titles both as a player and as a manager. As a player he won the Yugoslav First League with Željezničar in 1972, while as a manager the Bosnian First League in 1998.

== Club career ==
Hadžiabdić started playing football in the youth teams of Iskra Bugojno and Bratstvo Travnik, before signing his first professional contract with Željezničar in 1965. During the next nine years at Željezničar, he played more than 450 games for the club. He also won the Yugoslav First League in the 1971–72 season with Željezničar.

In 1974, Hadžiabdić signed with Belgian side Charleroi where he stayed for three seasons. After Charleroi he went back to Bosnia and Herzegovina and joined Velež Mostar. After 2 years at Velež, Hadžiabdić went to Greece and signed a contract with AEL where he stayed 1 year and afterwards retired from professional football in 1980 at the age of 35.

== International career ==
Hadžiabdić was one of the best European defenders in the early 1970s and he made his debut for Yugoslavia in an April 1970 friendly match against Austria and has earned a total of 11 caps, scoring no goals. He was also a member of the team that participated in the 1974 FIFA World Cup. His final international was a July 1974 World Cup match against Sweden.

== Managerial career ==
After retirement, Hadžiabdić returned to Sarajevo where he graduated from the University of Sarajevo Faculty of Physical Education.

=== Managing in Iran and Qatar ===
In 1994, Hadžiabdić became a manager of the Iran Olympic team, and two years later in 1995, manager of the Al-Rayyan youth team. He was the manager of the youth team until 1997.

=== Željezničar ===
In January 1998, Hadžiabdić took over the place of manager in his favourite Željezničar. He managed to lead the club to the Bosnian championship title in his first season. In the winter of 1999, Hadžiabdić stepped down because of disappointing league results, despite winning the Bosnian Supercup in 1998 against the club's biggest rivals - Sarajevo.

Nevertheless, he was back again next season in 1999 in which he guided the club to its first Bosnian Cup title in 2000. He again left the club shortly after winning the cup.

=== Tirana ===
In 2002, Hadžiabdić became the new manager of Albanian Superliga club Tirana. In his only season with the club, he won the Albanian Supercup on 14 September 2002 after beating Dinamo Tirana 6–0 in that year's Supercup. He was sacked by the club management on 21 February 2003 after a series of poor results.

=== Return to Željezničar ===
After several years working as a stadium director, Hadžiabdić yet again became manager of Željezničar on 10 January 2007, working as manager until January 2008.

== Honours ==
=== Player ===
Željezničar

- Yugoslav First League: 1971–72

=== Manager ===
Željezničar

- Bosnian First League: 1997–98
- Bosnian Cup: 1999–2000
- Bosnian Supercup: 1998

Tirana

- Albanian Supercup: 2002
