= 1999–2000 Bosnia and Herzegovina Football Cup =

Tournament details
- Country: Bosnia and Herzegovina

Final positions
- Champions: Željezničar; 1st national cup title
- Runners-up: 1. Sloboda Tuzla; 2. Bosna Visoko

1999–2000 Bosnia and Herzegovina Football Cup was the sixth season of Bosnia and Herzegovina's annual football cup. The Cup was won by Željezničar who were first in the final group.

== Overview ==
In the final stage of the competition, four clubs from the Football Federation of Bosnia and Herzegovina and the two clubs from the Football Federation of Herzeg-Bosnia joined the competition. After a preliminary round, the remaining three advanced to the final group with only forward matches at the end of which the first-placed in the group won the trophy and qualified for the 2000–01 UEFA Cup (qualifying round).

== Bosniak Cup ==
=== Round of 32 ===
The matches were played on 27 November 1999.

Team 1	Score	Team 2
Moštre	1–0	Đerzelez
Radnik Lipnica	2–3	Rudar Kakanj
Travnik	1–1 (4–2 p)	Iskra Bugojno
Igman Konjic	1–0	Krajina Cazin
Bratstvo Novi Travnik	3–5	Gradina Srebrenik
Rudar Breza	0–1	Čelik Zenica
Fruti Čelić	0–2	Drina Zvornik-Živinice
Goražde	1–0	Jedinstvo Bihać
Dobrinja Sarajevo	0–3	TOŠK Tešanj
Sloboda Mahala	0–1	Velež
Mladost Bosanski Petrovac	2–5	Sloboda Tuzla
Zmaj od Bosne	3–1	Lukavac
Krivaja Zavidovići	0–5	Željezničar
UNIS Vogošća	2–5	Sarajevo
OFK Tuzla	1–1 (3–1 p)	Budućnost Banovići
Ozren Semizovac	1–6	Bosna Visoko

=== Round of 16 ===
The matches were played on 4 December 1999.

Team 1	Score	Team 2
Čelik Zenica	1–3	Sloboda Tuzla
Travnik	3–1	Sarajevo
Igman Konjic	2–1	Drina Zvornik-Živinice
Zmaj od Bosne	1–1 (4–2 p)	Rudar Kakanj
Goražde	0–5	Željezničar
Bosna Visoko	1–1 (4–2 p)	Velež
OFK Tuzla	1–1 (3–4 p)	TOŠK Tešanj
Moštre	0–2	Gradina Srebrenik

=== Quarterfinals ===
The first legs were played on 26 February and the second legs were played on 22 March 2000.

Team 1	Agg.	Team 2	1st leg	2nd leg
Sloboda Tuzla	3–0	Gradina Srebrenik	1–0	2–0
Željezničar	4–3	Travnik	1–1	3–2
TOŠK Tešanj	3–3 (5–4 p)	Igman Konjic	3–0	0–3
Zmaj od Bosne	0–4	Bosna Visoko	0–2	0–2

== Preliminary round ==
The first legs were played on 22 May and the second legs were played on 26 May 2000.

Team 1	Agg.	Team 2	1st leg	2nd leg
Željezničar	2–0	TOŠK Tešanj	2–0	0–0
Sloboda Tuzla	1–0	Kiseljak	1–0	0–0
Bosna Visoko	5–2	Orašje	0–0	5–2

== Final group ==
Pos	Team	Pld	W	D	L	GF	GA	GD	Pts
1	Željezničar (C)	2	1	1	0	5	3	+2	4
2	Sloboda Tuzla	2	1	0	1	3	4	−1	3
3	Bosna Visoko	2	0	1	1	3	4	−1	1

Source: RSSSF
(C) Champions
30 May 2000

Bosna Visoko	2–2	Željezničar
Alagić 28'; Memić 90' (pen.)		Žerić 37'; Radonja 78'

3 June 2000

Sloboda Tuzla	2–1	Bosna Visoko
Karić 45'; Osmanhodžić 53'		Ćosić 62'

7 June 2000

Željezničar	3–1	Sloboda Tuzla
Žerić 18' (pen.); Muratović 39'; Mekić 43'		Osmanhodžić 31'

Stadion Grbavica, Sarajevo
Attendance: 8,000
Referee: Zvonko Mikić (Kostrč)

== See also ==
- 1999–2000 First League of Bosnia and Herzegovina
