= 1997–98 Atlético Madrid season =

92nd season in existence of Atlético Madrid

Atlético Madrid
1997–98 season
- President: Jesús Gil
- Head coach: Radomir Antić
- Stadium: Vicente Calderón
- La Liga: 7th (qual. for 1998–99 UEFA Cup)
- Copa del Rey: Round of 16
- UEFA Cup: Semi-finals
- Top goalscorer: League: Christian Vieri (24); All: Christian Vieri (29)
| Home colours | Away colours | Third colours |

The 1997–1998 campaign was the 92nd season in Atlético Madrid's history and their 63rd season in La Liga, the top division of Spanish football.

== Season summary ==
Atlético Madrid failed to regain the title they had won in 1996 and finished the season in 7th place. One of the high points of the season was the club's run in the UEFA Cup, reaching the semi-finals. Striker Christian Vieri was the club's top scorer, scoring 24 goals in La Liga (he finished as the league's top scorer and was awarded the Pichichi Trophy) and 29 in all competitions, but transferred to Lazio (who knocked Atlético out of the UEFA Cup) at the end of the season.

== Squad ==
Squad at end of season

Note: Flags indicate national team as defined under FIFA eligibility rules; some limited exceptions apply. Players may hold more than one non-FIFA nationality.

| No. | Pos. | Nation | Player |
|---|---|---|---|
| 1 | GK | ESP | José Francisco Molina |
| 3 | DF | ESP | Toni |
| 4 | DF | BRA | Andrei Frascarelli |
| 5 | DF | ESP | Juan Manuel López |
| 6 | DF | ESP | Santi |
| 7 | MF | BRA | Juninho |
| 8 | MF | ESP | Juan Vizcaíno |
| 9 | FW | ITA | Christian Vieri |
| 10 | MF | YUG | Milinko Pantić |
| 11 | FW | ESP | Jordi Lardín |
| 12 | FW | POR | Paulo Futre |

| No. | Pos. | Nation | Player |
|---|---|---|---|
| 13 | GK | ESP | Pedro Jaro |
| 14 | FW | ESP | José Mari |
| 15 | DF | ESP | Carlos Aguilera |
| 19 | FW | ESP | Kiko |
| 20 | DF | ESP | Delfí Geli |
| 21 | MF | ESP | José Luis Caminero |
| 23 | DF | ROU | Daniel Prodan |
| 24 | MF | CZE | Radek Bejbl |
| 25 | MF | YUG | Veljko Paunović |
| 26 | MF | ISR | Avi Nimni |
| 27 | MF | ESP | Ivo |
| 28 | DF | ESP | Ramón |

=== Transfers ===
In
| Pos. | Name | from | Type |
|---|---|---|---|
| FW | Christian Vieri | Juventus | |
| MF | Juninho | Middlesbrough | |
| DF | Andrei Frascarelli | Atletico Paranaense | |
| FW | Jordi Lardín | RCD Espanyol | |
| FW | Jose Mari | Sevilla FC | |
| FW | Paulo Futre | West Ham United | |
| MF | Rade Bogdanović | JEF United Ichihara | |
| GK | Pedro Jaro | Real Betis | |
| FW | Avi Nimni | Maccabi Tel Aviv | |
| DF | Ramón | Real Valladolid | |

Out
| Pos. | Name | To | Type |
|---|---|---|---|
| MF | Diego Simeone | Internazionale | |
| FW | Juan Esnaider | Espanyol | |
| FW | Juan Carlos | Real Valladolid | |
| FW | Leonardo Biagini | CP Merida | |
| DF | Roberto Solozabal | Real Betis | |

==== Winter ====
In
| Pos. | Name | from | Type |

Out
| Pos. | Name | To | Type |
|---|---|---|---|
| MF | Rade Bogdanović | NAC Breda | |
| FW | Avi Nimni | Maccabi Tel Aviv | |
| FW | Santiago Ezquerro | Mallorca | |
| MF | Roberto | Espanyol | loan |
| GK | Ricardo | Real Valladolid | |

=== La Liga ===
==== League table ====
| Pos | Team | Pld | W | D | L | GF | GA | GD | Pts | Qualification or relegation |
|---|---|---|---|---|---|---|---|---|---|---|
| 5 | Mallorca | 38 | 16 | 12 | 10 | 55 | 39 | +16 | 60 (Note: MLL: 9 pts; CEL: 5 pts; ATM: 2 pts) | Qualification for the Cup Winners' Cup first round (Note: Since Barcelona, winners of 1997–98 Copa del Rey, was qualified for the 1998–99 UEFA Champions League, losing cup finalists RCD Mallorca earned a spot in the first round of the 1998–99 UEFA Cup Winners' Cup.) |
| 6 | Celta Vigo | 38 | 17 | 9 | 12 | 54 | 47 | +7 | 60 | Qualification for the UEFA Cup first round |
| 7 | Atlético Madrid | 38 | 16 | 12 | 10 | 79 | 56 | +23 | 60 | Qualification for the UEFA Cup first round |
| 8 | Real Betis | 38 | 17 | 8 | 13 | 49 | 50 | −1 | 59 | Qualification for the UEFA Cup first round |
| 9 | Valencia | 38 | 16 | 7 | 15 | 58 | 52 | +6 | 55 | Qualification for the Intertoto Cup third round |

Source: LFP
Rules for classification: 1) points; 2) head-to-head points; 3) head-to-head goal difference; 4) head-to-head goals scored; 5) goal difference; 6) number of goals scored.

==== Results by round ====
| Round | 1 | 2 | 3 | 4 | 5 | 6 | 7 | 8 | 9 | 10 | 11 | 12 | 13 | 14 | 15 | 16 | 17 | 18 | 19 | 20 | 21 | 22 | 23 | 24 | 25 | 26 | 27 | 28 | 29 | 30 | 31 | 32 | 33 | 34 | 35 | 36 | 37 | 38 |
|---|---|---|---|---|---|---|---|---|---|---|---|---|---|---|---|---|---|---|---|---|---|---|---|---|---|---|---|---|---|---|---|---|---|---|---|---|---|---|
| Ground | A | H | A | H | A | H | A | H | A | H | H | A | H | A | H | A | H | A | H | H | A | H | A | H | A | H | A | H | A | A | H | A | H | A | H | A | H | A |
| Result | D | W | L | D | W | W | W | L | W | W | D | D | W | D | W | D | L | L | W | D | L | W | D | W | L | W | D | D | L | L | D | L | W | W | D | L | W | W |
| Position | 9 | 2 | 9 | 10 | 6 | 3 | 3 | 7 | 5 | 4 | 5 | 5 | 3 | 3 | 3 | 3 | 4 | 6 | 4 | 5 | 5 | 4 | 5 | 4 | 4 | 3 | 3 | 4 | 7 | 7 | 8 | 9 | 8 | 7 | 8 | 8 | 7 | 7 |

Source: Competitive matches
A = Away; H = Home; W = Win; D = Draw; L = Loss; = Leader, 1998–99 UEFA Champions League Group stage; = 1998–99 UEFA Champions League Second qualifying round; = 1998–99 UEFA Cup First round; = 1998 UEFA Intertoto Cup First round

==== Matches ====
| 29 August 1997 1 | Real Madrid | 1-1 | Atlético de Madrid | Madrid |
| | Seedorf 75' | Report | 15'Juninho | Stadium: Estadio Santiago Bernabéu; Referee: Juan Brito Arceo |

| 5 September 1997 2 | Atlético Madrid | 5-0 | Real Valladolid | Madrid |
| | Bogdanovic 17'; Bogdanovic 37'; Santi 67' (pen.); Lardin 69'; Kiko 89' | Report | | Stadium: Estadio Vicente Calderón |

| 12 September 1997 3 | Athletic Bilbao | 1-0 | Atlético Madrid | Bilbao |
| | Etxeberria 8' | Report | | Stadium: San Mamés |

| 26 September 1997 4 | Atlético Madrid | 3-3 | Celta de Vigo | Madrid |
| | Vieri 75'; Jose Mari 77'; Vieri 81' (pen.) | Report | 2'Revivo; 56'Cadete; 89'Berges | Stadium: Estadio Vicente Calderón |

| 5 October 1997 5 | Real Oviedo | 0-2 | Atlético Madrid | Oviedo |
| | | Report | Caminero 14'; Vieri 43' | Stadium: Carlos Tartiere |

| 14 October 1997 6 | Atlético Madrid | 4-0 | CP Mérida | Madrid |
| | Vieri 41'; Kiko 47'; Juninho 53'; Jose Mari 89' | Report | | Stadium: Estadio Vicente Calderón |

| 17 October 1997 7 | Real Zaragoza | 1-5 | Atlético Madrid | Zaragoza |
| | Garitano 73' (pen.) | Report | 3' Kiko; 19', 39', 63' Vieri; 82' Jose Mari | Stadium: La Romareda |

| 26 October 1997 8 | Atlético Madrid | 0-2 | RCD Espanyol | Madrid |
| | | Report | 11' (o.g.)Kiko; 89'Galca | Stadium: Estadio Vicente Calderón |

| 31 October 1997 9 | Real Betis | 2-3 | Atlético Madrid | Sevilla |
| | Andrei 1' (o.g.); Finidi 89' | Report | 20'Juninho; 44'Vieri; 87'Lardin | Stadium: Estadio Benito Villamarin |

| 10 November 1997 10 | Atlético Madrid | 3-1 | SD Compostela | Madrid |
| | Aguilera 20'; Bogdanovic 34'; Pantic 86' (pen.) | Report | Penev 89' | Stadium: Estadio Vicente Calderón |

| 13 November 1997 11 | Atlético Madrid | 1-1 | UD Salamanca | Madrid |
| | Andrei 73' | Report | Pauleta 65' | Stadium: Estadio Vicente Calderón |

| 16 November 1997 12 | Real Sociedad | 0-0 | Atlético Madrid | San Sebastián |
| | | Report | | Stadium: Estadio Anoeta |

| 21 November 1997 13 | Atlético Madrid | 3-1 | Valencia CF | Madrid |
| | Bogdanovic 25'; Juninho 60' (pen.); Pantic 84' | Report | 49'Vlaovic | Stadium: Estadio Vicente Calderón |

| 29 November 1997 14 | Deportivo La Coruña | 2-2 | Atlético Madrid | La Coruña |
| | Madar 39'; Naybet 85' | Report | Lardin 8'; Andrei 80' | Stadium: Estadio Riazor |

| 5 December 1997 15 | Atlético Madrid | 2-1 | Sporting de Gijón | Madrid |
| | Bogdanovic 56'; Geli 72' | Report | Luna 85' | Stadium: Estadio Vicente Calderón |

| 13 December 1997 16 | CD Tenerife | 2-2 | Atlético Madrid | Santa Cruz de Tenerife |
| | Makaay 29'; Kodro 43' (pen.) | Report | Jose Mari 78'; Pantic 89' | Stadium: Estadio Heliodoro Rodriguez |

| 16 December 1997 17 | Atlético Madrid | 2-3 | RCD Mallorca | Madrid |
| | Santi 11'; Bogdanovic 49' | Report | Pepe Galvez 1'; Carreras 42'; Valeron 69' | Stadium: Estadio Vicente Calderón |

| 19 December 1997 18 | FC Barcelona | 3-1 | Atlético Madrid | Barcelona |
| | Luis Enrique 48', 70'; Giovanni 65' (pen.) | Report | 21'Roberto | Stadium: Camp Nou |

| 3 January 1997 19 | Atlético Madrid | 2-1 | Racing de Santander | Madrid |
| | Vieri 42'; Aguilera 50' | Report | Diego Lopez 76' | Stadium: Estadio Vicente Calderón |

| 9 January 1998 20 | Atlético Madrid | 1-1 | Real Madrid | Madrid |
| | Jose Mari 86' | Report | 68'Savio | Stadium: Estadio Vicente Calderón |

| 16 January 1998 21 | Real Valladolid | 2-1 | Atlético Madrid | Valladolid |
| | Santi 30' (o.g.); Peternac 62' (pen.) | Report | Kiko 34' | Stadium: Estadio Jose Zorrilla; Referee: Dauden Ibañez |

| 23 January 1998 22 | Atlético Madrid | 3-0 | Athletic de Bilbao | Madrid |
| | Vieri 12'; Vieri 50'; Frascarelli 72' | Report | | Stadium: Estadio Vicente Calderón |

| 31 January 1998 23 | Celta de Vigo | 1-1 | Atlético Madrid | Vigo |
| | Ito 29' | Report | 25' (pen.), 68' Juninho | Stadium: Estadio Balaídos |

| 8 February 1998 24 | Atlético Madrid | 4-1 | Real Oviedo | Madrid |
| | Jose Mari 25'; Vieri 35', 66'; Paunovic 86' | Report | Dely Valdés 83' | Stadium: Estadio Vicente Calderón |

| 14 February 1998 25 | CP Mérida | 2-1 | Atlético Madrid | Mérida |
| | Sinval 68'; Sinval 89' | Report | Vieri 48' | Stadium: Estadio Romano |

| 22 February 1998 26 | Atlético Madrid | 2-1 | Real Zaragoza | Madrid |
| | Vieri 52'; Kiko 74' | Report | Miquel Soler 88' | Stadium: Estadio Vicente Calderón |

| 27 February 1998 27 | RCD Espanyol | 2-2 | Atlético Madrid | Barcelona |
| | Ouedec 27'; Benitez 47' | Report | Jose Mari 58'; Vieri 59' | Stadium: Olímpic Lluís Companys; Referee: Eduardo Iturralde |

| 7 March 1998 28 | Atlético Madrid | 0-0 | Real Betis | Madrid |
| | | Report | | Stadium: Estadio Vicente Calderón |

| 13 March 1998 29 | SD Compostela | 2-1 | Atlético Madrid | Santiago de Compostela |
| | Sion 79'; Bellido 82' | Report | Vieri 59' | Stadium: San Lázaro; Referee: Lopez Nieto |

| 20 March 1998 30 | UD Salamanca | 5-4 | Atlético Madrid | Villares de la Reina |
| | Popescu 15'; Popescu 30'; Silvani 47'; Popescu 74'; Alonso 89' | Report | Vieri 11'; Vieri 43'; Vieri 82' (pen.); Vieri 84' | Stadium: El Helmántico |

| 27 March 1998 31 | Atlético Madrid | 2-2 | Real Sociedad | Madrid |
| | Vizcaíno 42'; Lardin 57' | Report | Aldeondo 61'; Adepoju 74' | Stadium: Estadio Vicente Calderón |

| 4 April 1998 32 | Valencia CF | 4-1 | Atlético Madrid | Valencia |
| | Ilie 46'; Mendieta 68' (pen.); Mendieta 71' (pen.); Piojo Lopez 75' | Report | Kiko 73' | Stadium: Estadio Mestalla |

| 10 April 1998 33 | Atlético Madrid | 3-0 | Deportivo La Coruña | Madrid |
| | Jose Mari 2'; Jemez 20' (o.g.); Santi 44' (pen.) | | | Stadium: Estadio Vicente Calderón |

| 18 April 1998 34 | Sporting de Gijón | 2-3 | Atlético Madrid | Gijón |
| | Cano 42'; Trotta 44' | | Paunovic 56'; Vieri 64'; Paunovic 70' | Stadium: Estadio El Molinon |

| 25 April 1998 35 | Atlético Madrid | 2-2 | CD Tenerife | Madrid |
| | Paunovic 18'; Jose Mari 84' | | Aguilera 26' (o.g.); Alexis 89' (pen.) | Stadium: Estadio Vicente Calderón |

| 2 May 1998 36 | RCD Mallorca | 2-1 | Atlético Madrid | Palma de Mallorca |
| | Pepe Gálvez 43'; Moya 47' | | Paunovic 15' | Stadium: Lluís Sitjar |

| 9 May 1998 37 | Atlético Madrid | 5-2 | FC Barcelona | Madrid |
| | Paunovic 19'; Couto 25' (o.g.); Vieri 60'; Caminero 70'; Vieri 82' | Report | Rivaldo 12' de la Peña 81' | Stadium: Estadio Vicente Calderón |

| 10 May 1998 38 | Racing Santander | 0-1 | Atlético Madrid | Santander |
| | | Report | Andrei 1' | Stadium: Estadio El Sardinero |

=== UEFA Cup ===
First round

| 16 September 1997 | Atlético Madrid (Spain) | 2–1 | (England) Leicester City | Madrid |
| 21:30 | Juninho 69'; Vieri 71' (pen.) | Report | Marshall 11' | Stadium: Estadio Vicente Calderón; Attendance: 25,000 |

| 30 September 1997 | Leicester City (England) | 0–2 | (Spain) Atlético Madrid | Leicester |
| 20:45 | | Report | Juninho 72'; Kiko 88' | Stadium: Filbert Street; Attendance: 20,776 |

Second round

| 21 October 1997 | Atlético Madrid (Spain) | 5–2 | (Greece) PAOK | Madrid |
| 21:30 | Vieri 10', 31', 55'; Lardín 12'; Kiko 75' | Report | Frantzeskos 19'; Marangos 65' | Attendance: 50,000 |

| 4 November 1997 | PAOK (Greece) | 4–4 | (Spain) Atlético Madrid | Thessaloniki |
| 20:45 | Frantzeskos 17'; Olivares 55'; Zagorakis 76' (pen.); Zouboulis 81' | Report | Lardín 2'; Bogdanović 28'; Santi 51'; Kiko 90' | Stadium: Toumba Stadium; Attendance: 25,000 |

Eightfinals

| 25 November 1997 | Croatia Zagreb | 1–1 | (Spain) Atlético Madrid | Zagreb |
| 20:45 | Mujčin 2' | Report | Caminero 61' | Stadium: Stadion Maksimir; Attendance: 40,000 |

| 9 December 1997 | Atlético Madrid (Spain) | 1–0 | Croatia Zagreb | Madrid |
| 21:30 | Caminero 44' | Report | | Stadium: Vicente Calderón Stadium; Attendance: 30,000 |

==== Quarterfinals ====
| 3 March 1998 | Atlético Madrid (Spain) | 1–0 | (England) Aston Villa | Madrid |
| 21:30 | Vieri 42' (pen.) | Report | | Stadium: Estadio Vicente Calderón; Attendance: 45,000; Referee: (Italy) Stefano Braschi |

| 17 March 1998 | Aston Villa (England) | 2–1 | (Spain) Atlético Madrid | Birmingham |
| 20:45 | Taylor 72'; Collymore 74' | Report | Caminero 29' | Stadium: Villa Park; Attendance: 39,163; Referee: (Netherlands) Mario van der Ende |

==== Semifinals ====
| 31 March 1998 | Atlético Madrid (Spain) | 0–1 | (Italy) Lazio | Madrid |
| 21:30 | | Report | Jugović 33' | Stadium: Vicente Calderón Stadium; Attendance: 55,000; Referee: (England) Paul Durkin |

| 14 April 1998 | Lazio (Italy) | 0–0 | (Spain) Atlético Madrid | Rome |
| 20:45 | | Report | | Stadium: Stadio Olimpico; Attendance: 37,000; Referee: (Hungary) László Vágner |

=== Copa del Rey ===
Second round

| 14 January 1998 | Real Zaragoza | 2-0 | Atlético de Madrid | Zaragoza |
| | | Report | | Stadium: Estadio La Romareda |

| 20 January 1998 | Atlético de Madrid | 2-1 (3-2 agg.) | Real Zaragoza | Madrid |
| | | Report | | Stadium: Estadio Vicente Calderón |

== Statistics ==
=== Players statistics ===
| No. | Pos | Nat | Player | Total | | La Liga | | Copa del Rey | | UEFA | |
| No. | Pos | Nat | Player | Apps | Goals | Apps | Goals | Apps | Goals | Apps | Goals |
|---|---|---|---|---|---|---|---|---|---|---|---|
| 1 | GK | (Spain) ESP | Molina | 47 | -65 | 37 | -54 | 0 | 0 | 10 | -11 |
| 15 | DF | (Spain) ESP | Carlos Aguilera | 45 | 2 | 36 | 2 | 1 | 0 | 8 | 0 |
| 6 | DF | (Spain) ESP | Santi | 43 | 4 | 33 | 3 | 2 | 0 | 8 | 1 |
| 4 | DF | (Brazil) BRA | Andrei | 41 | 4 | 31 | 4 | 1 | 0 | 9 | 0 |
| 20 | DF | (Spain) ESP | Geli | 36 | 1 | 22+6 | 1 | 2 | 0 | 6 | 0 |
| 8 | MF | (Spain) ESP | Vizcaino | 42 | 1 | 27+6 | 1 | 1+1 | 0 | 6+1 | 0 |
| 7 | MF | (Brazil) BRA | Juninho | 31 | 8 | 23 | 5 | 2 | 1 | 6 | 2 |
| 21 | MF | (Spain) ESP | Caminero | 35 | 5 | 22+3 | 2 | 2 | 0 | 7+1 | 3 |
| 19 | FW | (Spain) ESP | Kiko | 42 | 10 | 30+1 | 6 | 2 | 1 | 9 | 3 |
| 11 | FW | (Spain) ESP | Lardin | 42 | 6 | 29+3 | 4 | 1 | 0 | 8+1 | 2 |
| 9 | FW | (Italy) ITA | Vieri | 32 | 29 | 24 | 24 | 1 | 0 | 7 | 5 |
| 13 | GK | (Spain) ESP | Jaro | 3 | -5 | 1 | -2 | 2 | -3 | 0 | 0 |
| 24 | MF | (Czech Republic) CZE | Bejbl | 37 | 0 | 21+6 | 0 | 1+1 | 0 | 7+1 | 0 |
| 23 | DF | (Romania) ROU | Prodan | 25 | 0 | 17 | 0 | 1 | 0 | 5+2 | 0 |
| 10 | MF | (Federal Republic of Yugoslavia) YUG | Pantic | 39 | 3 | 15+14 | 3 | 0+2 | 0 | 4+4 | 0 |
| 3 | DF | (Spain) ESP | Toni | 18 | 0 | 11+2 | 0 | 0 | 0 | 2+3 | 0 |
| 17 | FW | (Federal Republic of Yugoslavia) YUG | Bogdanovic | 18 | 7 | 10+4 | 6 | 0+1 | 0 | 3 | 1 |
| 14 | FW | (Spain) ESP | José Mari | 44 | 9 | 8+27 | 9 | 2 | 0 | 1+6 | 0 |
| 25 | MF | (Federal Republic of Yugoslavia) YUG | Paunovic | 18 | 6 | 6+8 | 6 | 1 | 0 | 0+3 | 0 |
| 5 | DF | (Spain) ESP | Juanma López | 9 | 0 | 4+3 | 0 | 0 | 0 | 2 | 0 |
| 28 | DF | (Spain) ESP | Ramón | 6 | 0 | 4+2 | 0 | 0 | 0 | 0 | 0 |
| 26 | MF | (Israel) ISR | Nimni | 10 | 0 | 3+4 | 0 | 0 | 0 | 0+3 | 0 |
| 16 | FW | (Spain) ESP | Ezquerro | 5 | 0 | 2+2 | 0 | 0 | 0 | 0+1 | 0 |
| 18 | MF | (Spain) ESP | Roberto | 5 | 1 | 2+1 | 1 | 0 | 0 | 1+1 | 0 |
| 12 | FW | (Portugal) POR | Futre | 10 | 0 | 0+10 | 0 | 0 | 0 | 0 | 0 |
| 27 | MF | (Spain) ESP | Ivo | 2 | 0 | 0+2 | 0 | 0 | 0 | 0 | 0 |
| 29 | DF | (Argentina) ARG | Christian Diaz | 1 | 0 | 0 | 0 | 0 | 0 | 1 | 0 |
| 2 | DF | (Spain) ESP | Fede Bahon | 0 | 0 | 0 | 0 | 0 | 0 | 0 | 0 |

- Source: https://www.bdfutbol.com/en/t/t1997-987.html

=== Top scorers ===
| Rank | Position | Number | Player | La Liga | Copa del Rey | UEFA Cup | Total |
|---|---|---|---|---|---|---|---|
| 1 | FW | 9 | (Italy) Christian Vieri | 24 | 0 | 5 | 29 |
| 2 | FW | 19 | (Spain) Kiko | 6 | 1 | 3 | 10 |
| 3 | FW | 14 | (Spain) José Mari | 9 | 0 | 0 | 9 |
| 4 | MF | 7 | (Brazil) Juninho Paulista | 5 | 1 | 2 | 8 |
| 5 | FW | 17 | (Federal Republic of Yugoslavia) Rade Bogdanović^{1} | 6 | 0 | 1 | 7 |
| 6 | FW | 11 | (Spain) Jordi Lardín | 4 | 0 | 2 | 6 |
| 6 | MF | 25 | (Federal Republic of Yugoslavia) Veljko Paunović | 6 | 0 | 0 | 6 |
| 8 | MF | 21 | (Spain) José Luis Caminero | 2 | 0 | 3 | 5 |
| 9 | DF | 4 | (Brazil) Andrei | 4 | 0 | 0 | 4 |
| 9 | DF | 6 | (Spain) Santi Denia | 3 | 0 | 1 | 4 |
| 11 | MF | 10 | (Federal Republic of Yugoslavia) Milinko Pantić | 3 | 0 | 0 | 3 |
| 12 | DF | 15 | (Spain) Aguilera | 2 | 0 | 0 | 2 |
| 13 | MF | 8 | (Spain) Juan Vizcaíno | 1 | 0 | 0 | 1 |
| 13 | MF | 18 | (Spain) Roberto Fresnedoso^{1} | 1 | 0 | 0 | 1 |
| 13 | DF | 20 | (Spain) Delfí Geli | 1 | 0 | 0 | 1 |
| Own goals | | | | 2 | 0 | 0 | 2 |
| Totals | | | | 79 | 2 | 17 | 98 |

^{1}Player left the club during the season.

== See also ==
- Atlético Madrid
- 1997–98 La Liga
- 1997–98 Copa del Rey
- 1997–98 UEFA Cup
