= 2004–05 Premier League of Bosnia and Herzegovina =

Premijer Liga
- Season: 2004–05
- Champions: Zrinjski; 1st Premier League title 1st Bosnian title
- Relegated: Borac; Rudar (U)
- Champions League: Zrinjski
- UEFA Cup: Široki Brijeg; Žepče
- Matches: 240
- Goals: 589 (2.45 per match)
- Top goalscorer: Zoran Rajović (17 goals)

Statistics of Premier League of Bosnia and Herzegovina in the 2004–2005 season.

== Overview ==
It was contested by 16 teams, and HŠK Zrinjski Mostar won the championship.

== Clubs and stadiums ==
Location of clubs in Premijer Liga 2004–05

Team	Location
Borac	Banja Luka
Budućnost	Banovići
Čelik	Zenica
Leotar	Trebinje
Modriča Maxima	Modriča
Orašje	Orašje
Posušje	Posušje
Rudar	Ugljevik
Sarajevo	Sarajevo
Slavija	Istočno Sarajevo
Sloboda	Tuzla
Široki Brijeg	Široki Brijeg
Travnik	Travnik
Zrinjski	Mostar
Željezničar	Sarajevo
Žepče Limorad	Žepče

== League standings ==
Pos	Team	Pld	W	D	L	GF	GA	GD	Pts	Qualification or relegation
1	Zrinjski (C)	30	19	4	7	56	30	+26	61	Qualification to Champions League first qualifying round
2	Željezničar	30	15	6	9	31	22	+9	51	Ineligible for 2005–06 European competitions (Note: Originally UEFA Cup qualifiers were league runner-up and Cup winner, but due to UEFA licensing, qualifiers were allocated to teams which fulfill the criteria.)
3	Široki Brijeg	30	12	9	9	42	33	+9	45	Qualification to UEFA Cup first qualifying round
4	Sarajevo	30	13	6	11	39	37	+2	45	Ineligible for 2005–06 European competitions
5	Travnik	30	14	2	14	42	47	−5	44	
6	Modriča	30	11	9	10	38	32	+6	42	
7	Orašje	30	13	3	14	45	43	+2	42	
8	Budućnost	30	13	3	14	37	40	−3	42	
9	Posušje	30	13	3	14	34	43	−9	42	
10	Slavija	30	12	5	13	36	34	+2	41 (Note: Slavija awarded 3-0 Borac in week 11, Borac deducted 1 point)	
11	Sloboda Tuzla	30	11	8	11	30	28	+2	41	
12	Žepče	30	13	2	15	33	36	−3	41	Qualification to UEFA Cup first qualifying round
13	Čelik	30	13	2	15	29	37	−8	41	
14	Leotar	30	13	2	15	35	45	−10	41	
15	Borac Banja Luka (R)	30	13	2	15	36	39	−3	40	Relegation to Prva Liga RS
16	Rudar Ugljevik (R)	30	7	4	19	26	43	−17	25	Relegation to Prva Liga RS

Source: RSSSF.org
Rules for classification: 1) points; 2) goal difference; 3) number of goals scored.
(C) Champions; (R) Relegated

== Results ==
Home \ Away	BOR	BUD	ČEL	LEO	MOD	ORA	POS	RUG	SAR	SLA	SLO	ŠB	TRA	ZRI	ŽEL	ŽEP
Borac Banja Luka		1–0	1–0	5–1	1–2	1–2	4–3	1–0	3–0 (Note: The match between Borac Banja Luka and Sarajevo was registered with the result 3–0 for Borac because the guests refused to continue the match, after a physical attack of the Borac's supporters on the players of Sarajevo.)	3–1	0–0	1–0	3–0	1–0	0–1	1–0
Budućnost	1–0		3–0	5–1	3–1	1–0	3–1	3–1	3–0	1–0	1–1	0–3 (Note: The match between Buducnost and Široki Brijeg was registered 0–3 for away team, because the host did not clear the field of snow on time.)	3–0	2–0	1–1	1–0
Čelik	1–0	2–1		3–0	2–1	2–0	3–1	2–0	2–1	1–0	1–0	1–1	0–1	1–0	1–0	1–2
Leotar	0–0	2–1	2–0		3–1	1–0	0–2	4–2	1–0	1–2	3–2	2–1	2–0	3–2	2–1	3–1
Modriča	1–0	2–0	0–0	2–0		1–1	4–0	2–0	0–0	1–0	2–2	1–1	2–1	1–2	1–2	4–0
Orašje	3–0	2–0	3–1	3–1	1–1		4–0	4–1	5–3	2–1	2–1	2–1	3–0	1–3	1–2	1–0
Posušje	3–0	2–1	2–0	0–0	2–1	1–0		1–0	1–0	3–2	1–0	2–0	2–0	0–1	1–1	3–0
Rudar Ugljevik	1–2	1–2	1–0	3–1	0–0	3–0	0–0		0–2	2–0	2–0	0–0	1–0	0–1	0–1	1–0
Sarajevo	2–1	3–0	4–1	1–0	0–0	3–1	2–1	2–1		2–0	2–0	3–2	2–4	2–3	0–1	2–1
Slavija	3–0 (Note: The round 11 match between Slavija and Borac Banja Luka was registered with the result 3–0 for Slavija because the guests did not appear at the stadium, Borac was penalized by deducting one point.)	2–0	3–1	2–0	2–0	1–0	2–1	4–1	0–0		1–0	3–2	1–0	2–2	0–0	0–0
Sloboda Tuzla	3–1	0–0	2–0	1–0	2–1	2–0	2–0	2–1	1–1	2–0		0–0	2–1	2–2	2–0	1–0
Široki Brijeg	2–0	4–0	3–1	1–0	1–3	1–1	1–0	2–1	2–0	3–2	0–0		2–2	2–3	1–0	3–0
Travnik	2–1	4–1	1–0	1–0	4–1	3–1	4–1	3–1	0–0	2–0	1–0	2–3		1–2	2–0	3–1
Zrinjski	4–3	2–0	3–1	2–0	0–0	2–1	5–0	2–1	2–0	3–2	1–0	0–0	5–0		1–0	3–0
Željezničar	1–2	2–0	1–0	1–0	2–1	3–0	1–0	0–0	0–0	1–0	1–0	3–0	1–1	2–1		1–2
Žepče	2–0	2–0	0–1	0–2	2–1	3–1	2–0	2–1	0–1	1–0	3–0	0–0	5–0	2–1	2–0	

Source: RSSSF.org
Legend: Blue = home team win; Yellow = draw; Red = away team win.

== Top goalscorers ==
Rank	Player	Club	Goals
1	(Serbia and Montenegro) Zoran Rajović	Zrinjski	17
2	(Bosnia and Herzegovina) Edin Mehmedović	Budućnost	13
3	(Bosnia and Herzegovina) (Croatia) Ivo Pejić	Orašje	10
3	(Brazil) Wagner	Posušje	10
5	(Bosnia and Herzegovina) Goran Pavić	Modriča	9
5	(Bosnia and Herzegovina) (Croatia) Velimir Dolić	Travnik	9
7	(Croatia) Hrvoje Erceg	Široki Brijeg	8
7	(Bosnia and Herzegovina) Milanko Đerić	Slavija	8
7	(Bosnia and Herzegovina) Admir Hasančić	Čelik	8
7	(Bosnia and Herzegovina) Nikola Juričić	Široki Brijeg	8
7	(Serbia and Montenegro) Aleksandar Minić	Leotar	8
7	(Bosnia and Herzegovina) Velimir Brašnić	Orašje	8
