= Miloš Filipović =

Serbian footballer (born 1990)

Personal information
- Date of birth: 9 May 1990 (age 36)
- Place of birth: Belgrade, SFR Yugoslavia
- Height: 1.78 m (5 ft 10 in)
- Positions: Attacking midfielder; right winger

Team information
- Current team: Kolubara
- Number: 10

Youth career
- OFK Beograd

Senior career*
Years	Team	Apps	(Gls)
2009–2012	OFK Beograd	14	(0)
2009–2010	→ Mladost Apatin (loan)	25	(3)
2012	→ Kolubara (loan)	19	(2)
2013	Timok	17	(6)
2013–2014	Voždovac	1	(0)
2013–2014	→ BSK Borča (loan)	24	(5)
2014–2015	Drina Zvornik	24	(9)
2015–2019	Zrinjski Mostar	90	(30)
2019–2020	Larissa	5	(0)
2020–2021	Zrinjski Mostar	27	(6)
2021–2022	Kolubara	43	(8)
2023	Novi Pazar	10	(0)
2023–	Kolubara	32	(9)
- * Club domestic league appearances and goals as of 28 July 2024

Miloš Filipović (Serbian Cyrillic: Милош Филиповић; born 9 May 1990) is a Serbian professional footballer who plays as a midfielder for Kolubara.

== Career ==
After youth school career playing for OFK Beograd, Filipović joined to first team, but for first season, he was loaned to Mladost Apatin. Then, for season and half, he was playing for his home-club and made 14 appearances, he was loaned again, this time to Kolubara, where he was playing for one calendar year.

Filipović then moved to Timok, and later to Voždovac. He played only one league game for Voždovac before being loaned out to FK BSK Borča for the rest of the season. After Borča, for one season he played for Bosnian club FK Drina Zvornik.

In June 2015, Filipović signed a contract with Zrinjski Mostar. He won three consecutive Bosnian Premier League titles while at Zrinjski, and was also the top goalscorer of the 2017–18 season, scoring 16 goals.

On 22 April 2019, Filipović signed a three-year contract with Greek Super League club AEL, but he joined the club after his contract with Zrinjski expired on 31 May 2019. He made his debut for AEL on 25 August 2019, in a 1–1 away league draw against Atromitos Filipović terminated his contract with AEL on 3 January 2020.

On 4 January 2020, Filipović came back to Zrinjski after only six months, signing a three-and-a-half-year contract with the club. The first goal Filipović scored since his return to the club was in a 1–1 Herzegovina derby draw against Široki Brijeg on 8 March 2020. On 16 October 2020, he scored a hat-trick in Zrinjski's 4–0 league win against Tuzla City. In June 2021, Filipović left Zrinjski.

== Career statistics ==
As of match played on 30 May 2021.

Club	Season	League			Cup		Continental		Total	
Club	Season	Division	Apps	Goals	Apps	Goals	Apps	Goals	Apps	Goals
Mladost Apatin (loan)	2009–10	Serbian First League	25	3	—		—		25	3
OFK Beograd	2010–11	Serbian SuperLiga	12	0	1	0	2	0	15	0
OFK Beograd	2011–12	Serbian SuperLiga	2	0	0	0	—		2	0
OFK Beograd	Total		14	0	1	0	2	0	17	0
Kolubara (loan)	2011–12	Serbian First League	6	0	—		—		6	0
Kolubara (loan)	2012–13	Serbian First League	13	2	1	0	—		14	2
Kolubara (loan)	Total		19	2	1	0	—		20	2
Timok	2012–13	Serbian First League	17	6	—		—		17	6
Voždovac	2013–14	Serbian SuperLiga	1	0	0	0	—		1	0
BSK Borča (loan)	2013–14	Serbian SuperLiga	24	5	1	0	—		24	5
Drina Zvornik	2014–15	Bosnian Premier League	24	9	1	0	—		25	9
Zrinjski Mostar	2015–16	Bosnian Premier League	22	4	1	0	2	1	25	5
Zrinjski Mostar	2016–17	Bosnian Premier League	13	3	4	1	2	0	19	4
Zrinjski Mostar	2017–18	Bosnian Premier League	32	16	0	0	2	0	34	16
Zrinjski Mostar	2018–19	Bosnian Premier League	23	7	2	0	6	1	31	8
Zrinjski Mostar	Total		90	30	7	1	12	2	109	33
AEL	2019–20	Super League Greece	5	0	0	0	—		5	0
Zrinjski Mostar	2019–20	Bosnian Premier League	3	1	1	0	—		4	1
Zrinjski Mostar	2020–21	Bosnian Premier League	24	5	1	0	3	1	28	6
Zrinjski Mostar	Total		27	6	2	0	3	1	32	7
Career total			246	61	13	1	17	3	276	65

== Honours ==
Zrinjski Mostar

- Bosnian Premier League: 2015–16, 2016–17, 2017–18

=== Individual ===
- Bosnian Premier League top scorer: 2017–18
- Serbian SuperLiga Player of the Week: 2021–22 (Round 31)
