= 1997–98 SD Compostela season =

Compostela
1997–98 season
- President: José María Caneda
- Head coach: Fernando Vázquez (until 1 March); Gabriel Leis (from 8 March)
- Stadium: Estadio Multiusos de San Lázaro
- La Liga: 17th (relegated via playoff)
- Copa del Rey: Third round
- Top goalscorer: League: Lyuboslav Penev (16); All: Lyuboslav Penev (16)

1997–98 was the 36th season in the history of SD Compostela, and their fourth in La Liga.

== Season summary ==
Compostela parted company with head coach Fernando Vázquez in March 1998, with the club in the relegation playoff places. Gabriel Leis coached the team for the rest of the season, but couldn't save them, and they ended the year in 17th place. They faced Villarreal in the relegation playoff, where a 0–0 draw at El Madrigal and a 1–1 draw at San Lázaro saw them lose on away goals. They were relegated back to the Segunda División after four years in La Liga.

In the Copa del Rey they made it to the third round before being beaten 3–2 on aggregate by Segunda División side, and eventual semifinalists, Deportivo Alavés.

== Squad ==
Note: Flags indicate national team as defined under FIFA eligibility rules; some limited exceptions apply. Players may hold more than one non-FIFA nationality.

No.	Pos.	Nation	Player
1	GK	ESP	Rafa Gómez
2	DF	ESP	Javier Villena
3	DF	ESP	Nacho
4	DF	YUG	Goran Šaula
5	DF	ESP	Javier Bellido (captain)
6	MF	FRA	Franck Passi
8	MF	BRA	Fabiano
9	FW	NGA	Christopher Ohen
10	FW	BUL	Lyuboslav Penev
11	MF	ESP	Ángel Lekumberri
12	DF	ESP	Óscar Tabuenka
13	GK	ESP	Carlos Mariño
14	MF	ESP	José Ramón
15	DF	ESP	Borja Agirretxu

No.	Pos.	Nation	Player
16	MF	ESP	Paco Llorente
17	DF	BRA	William
18	DF	FRA	Stéphane Pignol
19	DF	FRA	Jean-François Hernandez
20	MF	RUS	Dmitri Popov
21	FW	NED	Romano Sion
22	MF	ESP	Mauro García
23	DF	NED	Juan Viedma
24	MF	MAR	Saïd Chiba
25	GK	NED	René Ponk
26	FW	ESP	Changui
27	FW	ESP	Juan Cabrejo
—	DF	ESP	Toño Castro
—	FW	BRA	Maurício Leandro

=== Left club during season ===
Note: Flags indicate national team as defined under FIFA eligibility rules; some limited exceptions apply. Players may hold more than one non-FIFA nationality.

No. / Pos. / Nation / Player; 7 / FW / ESP / Manuel (to Extremadura)	No. / Pos. / Nation / Player; 12 / MF / ESP / Carlos Sastre (to Rayo Vallecano)

== Squad stats ==
Last updated on 9 March 2021.

No.	Pos	Nat	Player	Total		La Liga		La Liga playoff		Copa del Rey	
No.	Pos	Nat	Player	Apps	Goals	Apps	Goals	Apps	Goals	Apps	Goals
1	GK	(Spain) ESP	Rafa Gómez	20	0	18	0	2	0	0	0
2	DF	(Spain) ESP	Javier Villena	13	0	10	0	2	0	0+1	0
3	DF	(Spain) ESP	Nacho	37	1	32	1	2	0	3	0
4	DF	(Federal Republic of Yugoslavia) YUG	Goran Šaula	8	0	5+1	0	0	0	2	0
5	DF	(Spain) ESP	Javier Bellido	36	7	29+1	7	2	0	3+1	0
6	MF	(France) FRA	Franck Passi	40	2	35	1	1	0	4	1
8	MF	(Brazil) BRA	Fabiano	40	4	37	4	1	0	2	0
9	FW	(Nigeria) NGA	Christopher Ohen	21	6	17+2	6	1+1	0	0	0
10	FW	(Bulgaria) BUL	Lyuboslav Penev	38	16	34	16	1	0	3	0
11	MF	(Spain) ESP	Ángel Lekumberri	35	2	25+4	2	2	0	3+1	0
12	DF	(Spain) ESP	Óscar Tabuenka	18	1	14+3	1	1	0	0	0
13	GK	(Spain) ESP	Carlos Mariño	4	0	1+1	0	0	0	2	0
14	MF	(Spain) ESP	José Ramón	27	0	21+2	0	0	0	2+2	0
15	DF	(Spain) ESP	Borja Agirretxu	11	0	4+7	0	0	0	0	0
16	MF	(Spain) ESP	Paco Llorente	32	1	12+15	1	0+2	0	1+2	0
17	DF	(Brazil) BRA	William	15	1	10+3	1	0	0	1+1	0
18	DF	(France) FRA	Stéphane Pignol	4	0	1+2	0	0	0	1	0
19	DF	(France) FRA	Jean-François Hernandez	15	2	11+3	1	0	0	1	1
20	MF	(Russia) RUS	Dmitri Popov	30	3	22+6	3	0+1	0	1	0
21	FW	(Netherlands) NED	Romano Sion	22	6	5+11	6	2	0	3+1	0
22	MF	(Spain) ESP	Mauro García	30	1	25+1	0	2	0	2	1
23	DF	(Netherlands) NED	Juan Viedma	29	1	11+14	1	1	0	3	0
24	MF	(Morocco) MAR	Saïd Chiba	31	4	12+14	3	2	1	2+1	0
25	GK	(Netherlands) NED	René Ponk	21	0	19	0	0	0	2	0
26	FW	(Spain) ESP	Changui	8	1	1+5	1	0+1	0	0+1	0
27	FW	(Spain) ESP	Juan Cabrejo	0	0	0	0	0	0	0	0
	DF	(Spain) ESP	Toño Castro	0	0	0	0	0	0	0	0
	FW	(Brazil) BRA	Maurício Leandro	0	0	0	0	0	0	0	0
Players who have left the club after the start of the season:
7	FW	(Spain) ESP	Manuel	18	1	7+7	1	0	0	3+1	0
12	MF	(Spain) ESP	Carlos Sastre	0	0	0	0	0	0	0	0

== La Liga ==
Pos	Team	Pld	W	D	L	GF	GA	GD	Pts	Qualification or relegation
15	Salamanca	38	12	9	17	46	46	0	45 (Note: RAC: 8 pts; SAL: 4 pts → SAL 2-0 TEN; TEN: 4 pts → TEN 2-0 SAL)	
16	Tenerife	38	11	12	15	44	57	−13	45	
17	Compostela (R)	38	11	11	16	56	66	−10	44	Qualification for the relegation playoffs
18	Oviedo (O)	38	9	13	16	36	51	−15	40	Qualification for the relegation playoffs
19	Mérida (R)	38	9	12	17	33	53	−20	39	Relegation to the Segunda División

Source: LFP
Rules for classification: 1) points; 2) head-to-head points; 3) head-to-head goal difference; 4) head-to-head goals scored; 5) goal difference; 6) number of goals scored.
(O) Play-off winners; (R) Relegated

== See also ==
- SD Compostela
- 1997–98 La Liga
- 1997–98 Copa del Rey
