= Dalibor Šilić =

Bosnian footballer

Personal information
- Full name: Dalibor Šilić
- Date of birth: 23 January 1979 (age 47)
- Place of birth: Konjic, SFR Yugoslavia
- Height: 1.72 m (5 ft 7 1/2 in)
- Position: Midfielder

Youth career
- Turbina Jablanica
- –1998: Zrinjski Mostar

Senior career*
Years	Team	Apps	(Gls)
1998–1999	Zrinjski Mostar	0	(0)
1999–2001	Brotnjo	33	(12)
2001	Maribor	2	(0)
2002–2003	Željezničar	23	(1)
2003–2013	Široki Brijeg	268	(53)
Total		326	(66)

International career
2001–2006	Bosnia and Herzegovina	7	(0)
2001	Bosnia and Herzegovina XI	2	(0)

Managerial career
- 2013–2021: Široki Brijeg (Sporting Director)
- 2024: Tashkent (Assistant Coach)
- * Club domestic league appearances and goals

Dalibor Šilić (born 23 January 1979) is a Bosnian retired professional footballer who played as a midfielder.

== Club career ==
Born in Konjic, SFR Yugoslavia, present day Bosnia and Herzegovina, Šilić started playing football in the youth teams of Turbina Jablanica and Zrinjski Mostar, before getting called up to the first team of Zrinjski in 1998. In 1999, he joined Brotnjo, with whom he won the 1999–2000 First League of Bosnia and Herzegovina. In 2001, Šilić left Brotnjo to join Slovenian PrvaLiga club Maribor, but shortly after left the club. In January 2002, he signed with Željezničar, where he won the Bosnian Premier League in the 2001–02 season and the Bosnian Cup in the 2002–03 season.

Šilić then joined Široki Brijeg in the summer of 2003, where he would eventually go on to play 10 years for the club, making over 260 league appearances and scoring over 50 league goals, winning the league title 2 times and the cup also 2 times. In December 2013, he finished his playing career at Široki Brijeg at the age of 34.

== International career ==
Šilić made his debut for Bosnia and Herzegovina in a June 2001 Merdeka Tournament match against Slovakia and has earned a total of 9 caps (2 unofficial), scoring no goals. His final international was an October 2006 European Championship qualification match against Greece.

== Post-playing career ==
After retiring, Šilić right away became the Sporting director of Široki Brijeg on 20 December 2013. After over seven years, on 12 January 2021, he unexpectedly resigned from the position.

== Honours ==
=== Player ===
Brotnjo

- First League of Bosnia and Herzegovina: 1999–00

Željezničar

- Bosnian Premier League: 2001–02
- Bosnian Cup: 2002–03

Široki Brijeg

- Bosnian Premier League: 2003–04, 2005–06
- Bosnian Cup: 2006–07, 2012–13

== See also ==
- List of NK Maribor players
- List of FK Željezničar Sarajevo players
