= Hadis Zubanović =

Bosnian footballer (born 1978)

Personal information
- Date of birth: 14 January 1978 (age 48)
- Place of birth: Sarajevo, SFR Yugoslavia
- Height: 1.88 m (6 ft 2 in)
- Position: Forward

Youth career
- –1995: Željezničar

Senior career*
Years	Team	Apps	(Gls)
1995–1999	Željezničar	81	(20)
1999	Karabükspor	17	(8)
1999–2001	Željezničar	44	(18)
2001–2002	İstanbulspor	25	(5)
2002	Anzhi Makhachkala	1	(0)
2003	Velež Mostar	9	(4)
2003–2004	Dibba Al-Hisn		
2004	Željezničar	15	(6)
2005–2007	Zagłębie Sosnowiec	58	(18)
Total		250	(79)

International career
1996–1999	Bosnia and Herzegovina U21	15	(4)
- * Club domestic league appearances and goals

Hadis Zubanović (born 14 January 1978) is a Bosnian retired professional footballer who played as a forward.

== Club career ==
Born in Sarajevo, SR Bosnia and Herzegovina, SFR Yugoslavia, Zubanović began his career with hometown club Željezničar. He started playing for the first team in the 1995–96 season as a youngster. He was regarded as one of the most promising forwards in the Bosnian First League. The most memorable moment of Zubanović's career came on 5 June 1998, when he scored in the 93rd minute for Željezničar in a Bosnian championship play-off game during the 1997–98 season against crosstown rivals Sarajevo in the city derby. That was the only goal of the game which brought his club its first championship title in independent Bosnia and Herzegovina, while Željezničar fans mark 5 June as "Zubandan" ("Zubanday").

In 1999, Zubanović left for Turkey where he signed with Karabükspor. After only half of a season, he returned to Željezničar where he stayed for two more years, winning another league title in the 2000–01 season. Later, he played for İstanbulspor, Velež Mostar and Dibba Al-Hisn, before returning to Željezničar once again in 2004.

Zubanović did not stay there for long, moving to Poland at the end of that year. From 2005 to 2007, he played for Zagłębie Sosnowiec where he finished his career.

== International career ==
Zubanović played for the Bosnia and Herzegovina U21 national team between 1996 and 1999, making 15 appearances and scoring 4 goals.

== Personal life ==
Zubanović's son Faris is also a professional footballer.

== Honours ==
Željezničar

- Bosnian First League: 1997–98
- Bosnian Premier League: 2000–01
- Bosnian Cup: 1999–2000, 2000–2001
- Bosnian Supercup: 1998, 2000, 2001
