= FK Milići =

Milići
- Full name: FK Milići
- Founded: 1972
- Ground: Stadion Supac Polje, Milići
- Chairman: Jugoslav Dukić
- Manager: Zoran Majstorović
- League: Republika Srpska 2. Liga
- 2010–11: 10
Home colours	Away colours

FK Milići (Serbian Cyrillic: ФК Боксит Милићи) is a football club from the town of Milići, in Republika Srpska, Bosnia and Herzegovina.

== History ==
=== FK Boksit Milići ===
The club was established in 1972 by the bauxite extraction industry company, Boksit, which is a major employer in the town. In the early 1990s business Rajko Dukić invested in sports development in Milići and local teams became champions of Republika Srpska in football, chess, bowling and woman handball.

FK Boksit Milići became champions of the first edition of the First League of Republika Srpska, more precisely, of the 1995–96 season. The league included two groups, east and west. The champions of each group played a final between them in order to find the champion. Boksit were champions of the east group and played against the west group champions, FK Rudar Prijedor. The final was played in two legs. The first game was played in Milići on July 31, 1996; after a bad start that made them be 2-nil down within 10 minutes, Boksit then made an impressive come-back that resulted in a 5–2 win.

The second hand was played in Prijedor and Boksit lost by 1–2, but the overall score of 6–4 made Boksit the first champions of Republika Srpska. Players such as Dejan Pantelić, Dejan Dragičević, Zoran Majstorović, Milanko Đerić, Aleksandar Škrba, Dejan Pantelić, Ranko Zarić, Goran Simić, Dragiša Krajšumović, Aleksandar Obrenović, Goran Đurić, Aleksandar Samurović, Milenko Vukotic and Goran Sarić marked this period. Later, the club lost the support from the company and was relegated to lower leagues, ending by changing the name to FK Milići.

== Honors ==
First League of the Republika Srpska

- Champions (2): 1995–96, 1999–2000

== Coaching history ==
- (Bosnia and Herzegovina) Zoran Jagodić
- (Bosnia and Herzegovina) Duško Bajić
- (Bosnia and Herzegovina) Dragiša Krajšumović

== External sources ==
- Club at RS-Sport.
- Club at RS-Sport.
