= Petrovići, Istočno Novo Sarajevo =

Petrovići Петровићи
- Village
- Location within Bosnia and Herzegovina
- Coordinates: 43°48′14″N 18°26′05″E
- Country: Bosnia and Herzegovina
- Entity: Republika Srpska
- Municipality: Istočno Novo Sarajevo
- Time zone: UTC+1 (CET)
  - Summer (DST): UTC+2 (CEST)

Petrovići (Serbian Cyrillic: Петровићи) is a village in Bosnia and Herzegovina. According to the 1991 census, it had a population of 264 inhabitants. The village is located in the municipality of Istočno Novo Sarajevo, Republika Srpska, Bosnia and Herzegovina.

== Notable people ==
- Dragan Škrba
