= Wagner (footballer, born 1978) =

Brazilian football manager (born 1978)

Personal information
- Full name: Wagner Santos Lago
- Date of birth: 1 January 1978 (age 48)
- Place of birth: Ilhéus, Brazil
- Height: 1.78 m (5 ft 10 in)
- Position: Attacking midfielder

Team information
- Current team: Široki Brijeg U17 (manager)

Senior career*
Years	Team	Apps	(Gls)
2003	Jaboticabal Atlético	12	(3)
2003–2005	Posušje	58	(35)
2005–2018	Široki Brijeg	239	(90)
2018–2020	Imotski		
Total		309	(128)

Managerial career
- 2020: Široki Brijeg U19
- 2021–2022: Široki Brijeg U19
- 2025–: Široki Brijeg U17
- * Club domestic league appearances and goals

Wagner Santos Lago (born 1 January 1978), known as Wagner, is a Brazilian football manager and former player who played as an attacking midfielder. He is the current manager of the under-17 team of Široki Brijeg.

== Playing career ==
=== Early career ===
Born in Ilhéus, Brazil, Wagner began playing football with local clubs in the Bahia, Goiás and São Paulo state competitions before embarking on a fifteen-year career in Bosnia and Herzegovina. He left Jaboticabal Atlético for Posušje in July 2003.

=== Široki Brijeg ===
In the summer of 2005, Wagner went to Široki Brijeg where he played the best games in his entire career and also won one league title and three national cups. He had an average of more than ten goals per season while playing for Široki Brijeg. In the 2013–14 season, Wagner was the league top goalscorer, scoring 18 goals in that season. He was given the Bosnian Premier League Player of the Season award in the following season.

Wagner left Široki Brijeg at the age of 40, setting at the time a record of 125 goals and 297 appearances in the Bosnian Premier League with Široki Brijeg and Posušje.

=== Imotski ===
In August 2018, Wagner signed a part-time contract with Croatian 3. HNL club Imotski.

== Managerial career ==
=== Široki Brijeg ===
On 1 July 2020, after finishing his playing career, Wagner became the new manager of the under-19 team of Široki Brijeg. In his first game as manager, the side lost against the under-19 team of Željezničar on 9 August 2020.

In June 2023, Wagner was appointed as an assistant manager to Marijan Budimir at Široki Brijeg's first team.

== Personal life ==
Wagner's brother, Ricardo, was also a professional footballer who played with Wagner at Široki Brijeg and became a naturalised Bosnian international.

== Managerial statistics ==
As of 28 May 2022

Managerial record by team and tenure
Team	From	To	Record							
Team	From	To	G	W	D	L	GF	GA	GD	Win %
Široki Brijeg U19	1 July 2020	31 December 2020	10	3	2	5	11	11	+0	30.00
Široki Brijeg U19	1 July 2021	1 June 2022	26	11	1	14	46	49	−3	42.31
Total			36	14	3	19	57	60	−3	38.89

== Honours ==
Široki Brijeg

- Bosnian Premier League: 2005–06
- Bosnian Cup: 2006–07, 2012–13, 2016–17

Individual

- Bosnian Premier League Player of the Season: 2014–15
- Bosnian Premier League top scorer: 2013–14
