= Kostrč =

Village in Bosnia and Herzegovina

- Village
- Location within Bosnia and Herzegovina
- Coordinates: 45.0250838°N 18.6546349°E
- Country: Bosnia and Herzegovina
- Entity: Federation of Bosnia and Herzegovina
- Canton: Posavina
- Municipality: Orašje

Area
  - Total: 3.42 sq mi (8.87 km^{2})

Population (2013)
  - Total: 1,379
  - Density: 403/sq mi (155/km^{2})
- Time zone: UTC+1 (CET)
  - Summer (DST): UTC+2 (CEST)

Kostrč is a village in the municipality of Orašje, Bosnia and Herzegovina.

== Demographics ==
According to the 2013 census, its population was 1,379.

Ethnicity in 2013
Ethnicity	Number	Percentage
Croats	1,345	97.5%
Serbs	20	1.5%
Bosniaks	3	0.2%
other/undeclared	11	0.8%
Total	1,379	100%
