= Suvad Katana =

Bosnia and Herzegovina footballer (1969–2005)

- Katana while at Lokeren

Personal information
- Full name: Suvad Katana
- Date of birth: 6 April 1969
- Place of birth: Trnovo, SFR Yugoslavia
- Date of death: 8 January 2005 (aged 35)
- Place of death: Sarajevo, Bosnia and Herzegovina
- Height: 1.79 m (5 ft 10 in)
- Position: Sweeper

Youth career
- 1978–1987: Željezničar

Senior career*
| Years | Team | Apps | (Gls) |
| 1987–1992 | Željezničar | 96 | (2) |
| 1992–1994 | Genk | 64 | (4) |
| 1994–1996 | Gent | 67 | (3) |
| 1996–1998 | Anderlecht | 50 | (2) |
| 1998–1999 | Adanaspor | 12 | (0) |
| 1999–2004 | Lokeren | 96 | (0) |
| Total | | 385 | (11) |

International career
| 1996–1998 | Bosnia and Herzegovina | 10 | (0) |
- * Club domestic league appearances and goals

Suvad Katana (Bosnian pronunciation: [katǎna]; 6 April 1969 – 8 January 2005) was a Bosnian professional footballer who played as a sweeper.

== Club career ==
Katana started playing football in Željezničar as a youngster. He made his league debut for the club in the 1987–88 season against Red Star Belgrade (0–0). Although still a teenager, he was a regular starter in the squad in the following seasons.

In 1992, War in Bosnia started and Katana fled to Switzerland with Gordan Vidović and Mario Stanić and subsequently moved to Belgium. He played there for Genk (1992–1994), Gent (1994–1996) and Anderlecht (1996–1998). After a season with Turkish side Adanaspor, he returned to Belgium and played for Lokeren (1999–2004). He ended his career in 2004 after suffering from persistent knee injuries.

He was one of the best defenders in the Belgian championship during the 1990s. He won many awards for his performances at various clubs.

== International career ==
Katana also played for the Bosnia and Herzegovina national team. His first game was against Albania on 24 April 1996, and last on 15 October 1998 against Lithuania. In total, he collected ten caps for the national team.

== Personal life ==
After retiring as a player, Katana worked in former teammate Vidović's real estate company.

In January 2005, Katana died in Sarajevo after suffering a cardiac arrest, aged 35. He was survived by his wife and two children.
