= Nermin Vazda =

Bosnian footballer (born 1967)

Personal information
- Date of birth: 30 August 1967 (age 59)
- Place of birth: Višegrad, SFR Yugoslavia
- Position: Forward

Youth career
- Drina HE Višegrad
- –1985: Sarajevo

Senior career*
Years	Team	Apps	(Gls)
1985–1989	Sarajevo	37	(3)
1989–1990	Leotar	19	(6)
1990–1993	Željezničar	24	(16)
1993–1995	Sarıyer	35	(6)
1995–1996	Türkiyemspor Berlin	25	(24)
1996–1997	Bosna Visoko	28	(17)
1997–1999	Željezničar	59	(37)
Total		227	(107)

International career
1997	Bosnia and Herzegovina	4	(0)
- * Club domestic league appearances and goals

Nermin Vazda (born 30 August 1967) is a Bosnian former professional footballer who played as a forward.

== Club career ==
Vazda started off his career at his hometown club Drina HE Višegrad, before moving to Sarajevo and signing with the youth team of FK Sarajevo, for who he played until 1985, before getting moved up to the first team in the same year.

In 1989, he left Sarajevo and went to Leotar, for who he played one year. After leaving Leotar in 1990, Vazda came back to Sarajevo and signed with Željezničar. He stayed at Željezničar until 1993, making 24 league appearances in the process and scoring 16 goals.

With the start of the Bosnian War, Vazda left Željezničar and Bosnia as well, going to Turkey and signing with Sarıyer in July 1993. After two years at Sarıyer, in 1995 he signed with German club Türkiyemspor Berlin. After a great season with Türkiyemspor, scoring 24 goals in 25 league games in the Berlin-Liga (German sixth level), Vazda came back to Bosnia after the war ended and signed a contract with rising club Bosna Visoko.

In the summer of 1997, six years after leaving the club, he came back to Željezničar. Vazda won his first trophy with Željezničar in the 1997–98 season, the First League of Bosnia and Herzegovina, after beating former club Sarajevo 1–0 in the Play-off final. He scored 19 goals for the club in the 1997–98 season, making him joint-top goalscorer of the league. He was also the 1996–97 and 1998–99 season top goalscorer, scoring 17 and 18 goals respectively. On 25 November 1998, he also won the Bosnian Supercup with Željezničar, once again beating Sarajevo, this time 4–0 at the Grbavica Stadium.

In June 1999, after the end of the 1998–99 season, Vazda decided to end his football career at the age of 31. He played 83 league matches for Željezničar and scored 52 goals with a goal average of 0,64 goals per game, making him one of the best all time goalscorers in the history of Željezničar. In his career, he played 227 league games and scored 107 goals.

== International career ==
Vazda played in four matches for the Bosnia and Herzegovina national team, all of the matches being friendly games at the 1997 Dunhill Cup in Malaysia.

== Personal life ==
Vazda's son Anes is also a professional footballer who plays as a midfielder.

== Honours ==
=== Player ===
Željezničar

- Bosnian First League: 1997–98
- Bosnian Supercup: 1998

Individual

- Bosnian First League top scorer: 1996–97, 1997–98 (shared), 1998–99
