= Gabriel Leis =

Spanish footballer

Personal information
- Full name: Gabriel Leis Veiga
- Date of birth: 7 May 1950 (age 76)
- Place of birth: Santiago de Compostela, Spain
- Position: Defender

Senior career*
Years	Team	Apps	(Gls)
–1972	Compostela		
1974–1983	Pontevedra	164	(5)
1983–198?	Lalín	36	(0)
Total		200	(0)

Managerial career
- 1998: Compostela
- 1998–1999: Compostela
- 2004: Compostela
- 2008: San Isidro
- * Club domestic league appearances and goals

Gabriel Leis Veiga (born 7 May 1950) is a Spanish retired footballer who played as a defender, and later worked as a manager.

== Playing career ==
Leis was born in Santiago de Compostela, the capital of the autonomous community of Galicia, and began his career with SD Compostela. He later joined Pontevedra, being part of the team that was promoted as 1975–76 Tercera División group winners. He played 36 matches in the Segunda División the following season, before Pontevedra were relegated to the brand new Segunda División B. They suffered relegation again, back to the Tercera División, in 1980–81, and went on to win their group for the next two seasons, without achieving promotion. Leis left in 1983 to join Lalín, with whom he won a fourth Tercera División group in 1984–85, and endured another Segunda División B relegation a year later.

== Managerial career ==
After his retirement, Leis returned to Compostela as a coach. He took over as first team manager in March 1998 after the departure of Fernando Vázquez, with the club in the La Liga relegation play-off places. Leis guided them to victory in five of their remaining 11 matches, but they still finished the season in 17th, and faced a relegation play-off against Villarreal. A 0–0 draw at El Madrigal was followed by a 1–1 draw at home at San Lázaro, meaning Compostela lost on away goals and were relegated to the Segunda División after four years in the top flight.

Leis was replaced by Antonio Maceda ahead of the new season, but Macedo lasted just nine games before departing in October with Compostela 13th in the Segunda División table. After Pichi Lucas acted as interim manager for three games, Leis returned as manager in late November. He was in charge for 15 matches, winning six, but despite improving the club's league position to 8th he left his position in March 1999. Compostela would total five managers that season, with Zoran Marić and Andoni Goikoetxea both taking the reins after Leis's departure.

For the 2003–04 season Compostela, who had by now slipped into Segunda División B, appointed Pichi Lucas as their permanent manager, but he departed in January with the club second from bottom. After one match with Franck Passi in interim charge, Leis took over for his third spell as manager. Compostela won just five of their remaining 18 matches, and were relegated to the Tercera División in 19th place. Financial problems, which had meant players refused to play one of their matches against Conquense due to unpaid wages, also led to Compostela being demoted another step to Regional Preferente de Galicia, and Leis left the club.

Leis returned to management in January 2008, taking over at San Isidro in Segunda División B. He won only one of his 10 matches in charge, and lost eight, before departing in March with the club bottom of the table. The rest of the season was no better, and they were relegated in last place.

== Honours ==
=== Player ===
Pontevedra

- Tercera División: 1975–76, 1981–82, 1982–83

Lalín

- Tercera División: 1984–85

== Career statistics ==
=== As a player ===
As of 8 March 2021

Club	Season	League			Cup		Total	
Club	Season	Division	Apps	Goals	Apps	Goals	Apps	Goals
Compostela	1971–72	Tercera División	?	?	2	0	2	0
Pontevedra	1974–75	Tercera División	?	?	4	0	4	0
Pontevedra	1975–76	Tercera División	?	?	4	0	4	0
Pontevedra	1976–77	Segunda División	36	0	4	1	40	1
Pontevedra	1977–78	Segunda División B	25	0	2	0	27	0
Pontevedra	1978–79	Segunda División B	32	1	2	0	34	1
Pontevedra	1979–80	Segunda División B	36	4	6	0	42	4
Pontevedra	1980–81	Segunda División B	35	0	–		35	0
Pontevedra	1982–83	Tercera División	?	?	3	0	3	0
Pontevedra	Total		164	5	25	1	189	6
Lalín	1984–85	Tercera División	?	?	2	0	2	0
Lalín	1985–86	Segunda División B	36	0	3	0	39	0
Lalín	Total		36	0	5	0	41	0
Career total			200	5	32	1	232	6

=== As a manager ===
As of 8 March 2021

Managerial record by team and tenure
Team	Nat	From	To	Record								Ref
Team	Nat	From	To	G	W	D	L	GF	GA	GD	Win %	Ref
Compostela	(Spain)	8 March 1998	24 May 1998	13	5	4	4	22	20	+2	38.46	
Compostela	(Spain)	22 November 1998	6 March 1999	15	6	5	4	19	13	+6	40.00	
Compostela	(Spain)	18 January 2004	16 May 2004	18	5	4	9	22	27	−5	27.78	
San Isidro	(Spain)	20 January 2008	23 March 2008	10	1	1	8	8	24	−16	10.00	
