= Srećko Ilić =

Yugoslav footballer

Personal information
- Full name: Srećko Ilić
- Date of birth: 2 October 1966 (age 60)
- Place of birth: Sarajevo, SFR Yugoslavia
- Position: Defender

Senior career*
Years	Team	Apps	(Gls)
1987–1992	Željezničar Sarajevo	88	(2)
1992–1994	Mura	47	(10)
1994–1995	Gorica	12	(3)
1995–1996	Beltinci	29	(2)
1996–1997	Korotan Prevalje	11	(0)
1997–1999	Mura	42	(5)
Total		229	(22)
- * Club domestic league appearances and goals

Srećko Ilić (born 2 October 1966 in Sarajevo) is a Yugoslav retired football player. Ilić played for Željezničar Sarajevo and, after the war broke, he later emigrated to Slovenia where he played for several clubs.
