= Vasilije Radović =

Yugoslav footballer and manager (1938–2019)

Personal information
- Date of birth: 10 September 1938
- Place of birth: Cetinje, Kingdom of Yugoslavia
- Date of death: 25 March 2019 (aged 80)
- Place of death: Cetinje, Montenegro
- Height: 1.82 m (6 ft 0 in)
- Position: Goalkeeper

Youth career
- –1957: Lovćen
- 1957–1962: Željezničar

Senior career*
Years	Team	Apps	(Gls)
1962–1966	Željezničar	102	(1)
1966–1967	Fenerbahçe	19	(0)
1967–1971	Željezničar	107	(0)
Total		228	(1)

International career
1964–1965	Yugoslavia	3	(0)

Managerial career
- 1976–1977: Željezničar (caretaker)
- * Club domestic league appearances and goals

Vasilije "Čiko" Radović (Serbian Cyrillic: Василије Радовић, 10 September 1938 – 25 March 2019) was a Yugoslav football goalkeeper and manager. Born in Montenegro, he spent most of his life in Sarajevo, Bosnia and Herzegovina.

Radović made three appearances for the Yugoslavia national team between 1964 and 1965.

== Club career ==
=== Early career and transfer to Željezničar ===
Radović started playing in Lovćen. During a friendly match with his team in 1957, Željezničar, officials spotted him and decided to offer him to start playing for their club. He accepted the offer. He stayed in Željezničar for nine years.

He even scored a goal for the club in the 1963–64 league season.

=== Fenerbahçe ===
In 1966, Radović moved to Turkish side Fenerbahçe S.K. He won the 1966–67 Balkans Cup with the club. However, he returned to Željezničar after only one season in Fenerbahçe.

=== Return to Željezničar and retirement ===
After returning to Željezničar, Radović played four more seasons until he decided to retire in 1971 because of an Achilles tendon injury. He played 307 official games for the club, 209 of them being league games, and has also scored 1 goal.

== International career ==
Radović made his debut for the Yugoslavia national team in an October 1964 friendly match against Hungary. He collected a total of 3 caps, scoring no goals. His final international was a September 1965 FIFA World Cup qualification match against Luxembourg.

== Managerial career ==
After retiring, Radović continued to work in football. He was a youth team coach in Željezničar and in the 1976–77 season he was a first team caretaker manager for the remainder of the season, after Milan Ribar stepped down.

After that, Radović continued to work with the club in various front office roles. He is one of the meritorious ones for saving Željezničar during the Bosnian War from 1992 until 1995.

== Death ==
Radović died on 25 March 2019, at the age of 80 in Cetinje, Montenegro.

== Honours ==
=== Player ===
Fenerbahçe

- Balkans Cup: 1966–67
