= Andrei Frascarelli =

Brazilian footballer (born 1973)

Personal information
- Full name: Andrei Frascarelli
- Date of birth: 21 February 1973 (age 53)
- Place of birth: Pederneiras, Brazil
- Height: 1.83 m (6 ft 0 in)
- Position: Centre back

Senior career*
Years	Team	Apps	(Gls)
1989–1990	XV de Jaú	0	(0)
1991–1993	Palmeiras	5	(1)
1993	Goiás	?	(?)
1993–1994	Flamengo	12	(1)
1994	Fluminense	28	(4)
1994–1995	Rosario Central	0	(0)
1995–1997	Athletico Paranaense	10	(0)
1997–1998	Atlético Madrid	31	(4)
1998–1999	Real Betis	0	(0)
1999	Santos	17	(0)
1999–2000	Real Betis	0	(0)
2000–2004	Marília	?	(?)
2004–2005	LR Ahlen	21	(0)
2006–2007	Rio Claro	0	(0)
2008	Ceilândia	0	(0)
Total		113	(10)

International career
1989	Brazil U17	4	(0)
1991	Brazil U20	6	(1)
- * Club domestic league appearances and goals

Andrei Frascarelli (born 21 February 1973), sometimes known simply as Andrei, is a Brazilian retired footballer who played as a defender.

He moved clubs regularly during his 19 year career, which included spells at 14 clubs in four countries. He made 31 appearances in Spain's La Liga for Atlético Madrid.

Andrei Frascarelli was a youth international for Brazil, and represented his country at the 1991 FIFA World Youth Championship in Portugal, where they finished as runners-up.

== Club career ==
Andrei was born in Pederneiras in the state of São Paulo, and started his professional career in 1989 with nearby XV de Jaú, which was competing in the lower reaches of the Brazilian league system. He was quickly identified as a promising talent, and prior to the 1991 season he was signed by São Paulo-based Série A giants Palmeiras.

He failed to make much impact at the club, making five appearances in two years. He moved rapidly through a series of Série A clubs, with short stints at Goiás and Flamengo preceding a more successful stint Fluminense. He played 28 games and scored four times to help the Rio de Janeiro club to a respectable 15th position in the league in 1994. At the end of the season, however, he moved on again, this time moving abroad to join Argentine Primera División club Rosario Central. He failed to make an impact in Rosario, and returned to Brazil the following year to join Athletico Paranaense.

He spent two seasons with the Curitiba club, making just ten appearances. He moved to Europe in 1997, joining one of La Liga's most well-respected clubs, Atlético Madrid. Andrei Frascarelli enjoyed one of the best seasons of his career, playing 31 times and scoring four goals as Los Rojiblancos secured 7th place in the league and reached the semi-finals of the UEFA Cup. However, he left the Vicente Calderón at the end of the season, joining Atleti's La Liga rivals Real Betis. He stayed at Betis for two seasons, but failed to make a single league appearance. He also enjoyed a brief return to his homeland during the European off-season in 1999, making 17 appearances for Santos.

Andrei Frascarelli returned to Brazil permanently in 2000, joining Marília, where he spent the next four years. He moved back to Germany in 2004, when he was signed by LR Ahlen of the 2. Bundesliga. After just one year, he returned once more to Brazil, finishing his career with short spells at Rio Claro, in his home state, and Ceilândia. He retired in 2008.

== International career ==
Andrei Frascarelli represented Brazil at two major youth tournaments early in his career. He was part of the squad at the 1989 FIFA U-16 World Championship, held in Scotland. He played in all three of Brazil's group games at Aberdeen's Pittodrie Stadium. they suffered a 1–0 loss to the United States in their first match, but recovered by beating Australia 3–1 and East Germany 2–1 to progress as runners-up. They drew their quarter-final 0–0 against Bahrain at Fir Park in Motherwell, and Andrei Frascarelli was the only Brazilian player able to convert his penalty as they were eliminated 4–1.

He was selected again for the 1991 FIFA World Youth Championship in Portugal, playing in all six games as Brazil reached the final. Andrei Frascarelli scored Brazil's first goal of the tournament as they beat the Ivory Coast 2–1 at the Estádio das Antas in Porto. They went on to draw 2–2 with Mexico and beat Sweden 2–0 at the same stadium to progress as group winners. In the knockout stages they saw off Korea 5–1 in Porto and the Soviet Union 3–0 at the Estádio D. Afonso Henriqueses in Guimarães to set up a final clash with the hosts. The match, held at the Estádio da Luz in Lisbon, ended 0–0, so the tournament would be decided on penalties. Andrei Frascarelli was on target again, but Brazil ultimately lost 4–2 and had to be content with the silver medal.

Despite this successful youth career, Andrei Frascarelli never received a call-up to the senior national team.
