= 1997–98 First League of Bosnia and Herzegovina =

Association football competition

Statistics of First League of Bosnia and Herzegovina in the 1997–98 season. It was contested only by Bosniak and Croatian clubs. Serbian clubs played in the 1997–98 First League of the Republika Srpska.

== Overview ==
It was contested by 6 teams. Željezničar have won the championship.

== First round ==
=== Bosniaks First League ===
==== League standings ====
Pos	Team	Pld	W	D	L	GF	GA	GD	Pts	Qualification or relegation
1	Bosna (Q)	30	19	3	8	55	28	+27	60	Qualification to championship play-off
2	Čelik (Q)	30	16	8	6	48	30	+18	56	Qualification to championship play-off
3	Sarajevo (Q)	30	15	8	7	56	33	+23	53	Qualification to championship play-off
4	Željezničar (Q)	30	14	7	9	49	42	+7	49	Qualification to championship play-off
5	Sloboda Tuzla	30	13	7	10	39	27	+12	46	
6	Gradina Srebrenik	30	13	5	12	41	42	−1	44	
7	Zenica	30	12	7	11	34	29	+5	43	
8	Zmaj od Bosne	30	10	11	9	38	35	+3	41	
9	Drina Zvornik-Živinice	30	12	5	13	30	31	−1	41	
10	Velež	30	11	7	12	44	52	−8	40	
11	Jedinstvo Bihać	30	11	5	14	30	40	−10	38	
12	Lukavac	30	9	9	12	32	38	−6	36	
13	Rudar Kakanj	30	10	6	14	28	32	−4	36	
14	Olimpic (R)	30	10	5	15	36	50	−14	35	Relegation to Second League of Bosnia and Herzegovina
15	Travnik (R)	30	9	6	15	35	45	−10	33	Relegation to Second League of Bosnia and Herzegovina
16	Rudar Breza (R)	30	3	7	20	29	79	−50	16	Relegation to Second League of Bosnia and Herzegovina

Source: RSSSF.org
Rules for classification: 1) points; 2) goal difference; 3) number of goals scored.
(Q) Qualified for the phase indicated; (R) Relegated

==== Results ====
Home \ Away	BOS	ČEL	DRZ	GRA	JED	LUK	OLI	RBR	RKA	SAR	SLO	TRA	VEL	ZEN	ZMA	ŽEL
Bosna		1–0	2–0	5–1	3–2	5–1	3–0	3–0	1–0	1–1	3–0	1–0	4–1	1–0	5–0	1–0
Čelik	2–0		0–1	1–0	1–0	0–0	1–0	6–0	0–0	3–1	2–1	5–1	3–0	2–0	2–0	1–1
Drina Zvornik-Živinice	0–0	3–4		0–1	3–0	2–0	1–0	4–1	0–0	1–0	1–0	1–1	2–0	2–1	2–0	2–1
Gradina Srebrenik	4–0	3–1	1–1		2–0	2–1	1–1	4–1	2–1	3–2	1–2	1–0	3–2	2–0	1–1	4–1
Jedinstvo Bihać	2–1	4–1	0–2	2–0		1–0	4–1	7–0	2–0	0–0	2–0	3–0	1–1	0–0	2–1	3–1
Lukavac	2–1	0–0	2–0	2–0	1–0		0–0	2–0	4–1	2–5	3–2	0–3	2–0	1–1	0–1	1–0
Olimpic	0–2	1–2	1–0	2–0	3–1	3–1		3–0	2–0	1–5	2–0	1–1	4–0	3–2	2–0	2–4
Rudar Breza	1–5	1–4	2–0	2–1	0–0	3–3	1–0		0–1	2–2	1–2	1–3	2–2	2–3	1–1	0–0
Rudar Kakanj	0–1	1–1	3–0	2–0	4–0	0–0	1–0	3–2		1–3	0–2	1–0	2–0	1–0	2–0	0–0
Sarajevo	2–1	3–0	2–1	3–2	3–0	2–2	2–0	1–0	1–0		0–0	5–1	3–0	0–0	2–0	1–1
Sloboda Tuzla	2–0	5–0	1–1	1–1	2–0	1–0	0–0	2–0	2–1	3–1		4–1	4–1	2–1	0–0	0–1
Travnik	1–2	0–1	2–0	0–0	2–0	1–0	2–0	3–1	1–1	0–0	1–0		2–3	0–1	1–1	4–1
Velež	0–1	1–1	1–0	3–0	3–0	1–1	7–2	0–0	3–1	3–2	2–1	2–1		1–0	1–1	4–3
Zenica	0–0	1–2	1–0	3–0	1–0	2–1	1–1	4–1	2–1	2–1	0–0	1–0	1–1		3–1	2–0
Zmaj od Bosne	4–1	1–1	1–0	0–1	0–0	0–0	5–0	5–0	1–0	2–1	0–0	4–2	2–0	1–0		1–1
Željezničar	2–1	1–1	3–0	2–1	2–1	1–0	3–1	3–2	2–0	1–2	1–0	4–1	3–1	2–1	4–4	

Source: RSSSF.org
Legend: Blue = home team win; Yellow = draw; Red = away team win.

==== Top goalscorers ====
Rank	Scorer	Club	Goals
1	(Bosnia and Herzegovina) Nermin Hajdarević	Čelik Zenica	19
1	(Bosnia and Herzegovina) Nermin Vazda	Željezničar	19
3	(Bosnia and Herzegovina) Sead Vranić	Bosna Visoko	16
4	(Bosnia and Herzegovina) Alen Avdić	Sarajevo	14
5	(Bosnia and Herzegovina) Adis Obad	Velež Mostar	13
6	(Bosnia and Herzegovina) Abdulah Ibraković	Gradina	11
6	(Bosnia and Herzegovina) Nermin Hrvat	Rudar Breza	11

- Source: SportSport.ba forum

=== First League of Herzeg-Bosnia ===
==== League standings ====
Pos	Team	Pld	W	D	L	GF	GA	GD	Pts	Qualification or relegation
1	Široki Brijeg (Q)	30	24	4	2	87	10	+77	76	Qualification to Championship play-off
2	Zrinjski Mostar (Q)	30	19	7	4	72	21	+51	64	Qualification to Championship play-off
3	Orašje	30	18	3	9	65	31	+34	57	
4	Brotnjo Čitluk	30	16	8	6	64	29	+35	56	
5	Troglav Livno	30	17	4	9	51	25	+26	55	
6	Stolac	30	14	7	9	57	35	+22	49	
7	Kiseljak	30	13	5	12	42	37	+5	44	
8	GOŠK Gabela	30	13	4	13	43	48	−5	43	
9	Ljubuški	30	13	4	13	46	44	+2	43	
10	Posušje	30	11	6	13	44	45	−1	39	
11	Sloga Uskoplje	30	10	5	15	44	64	−20	35	
12	Vitez	30	9	7	14	37	53	−16	34	
13	Novi Travnik (R)	30	8	4	18	28	83	−55	28	Relegation to Second League of Herzeg-Bosnia
14	Napredak Matići (R)	30	7	3	20	26	65	−39	24	Relegation to Second League of Herzeg-Bosnia
15	Usora Žabljak (R)	30	6	4	20	36	81	−45	22	Relegation to Second League of Herzeg-Bosnia
16	Kostrč (R)	30	3	3	24	21	93	−72	12	Relegation to Second League of Herzeg-Bosnia

(Q) Qualified for the phase indicated; (R) Relegated

== Play-offs ==
=== Group stage ===
==== Group Sarajevo ====
Pos	Team	Pld	W	D	L	GF	GA	GD	Pts	Qualification
1	Željezničar	2	2	0	0	5	1	+4	6	Advanced to final
2	Bosna	2	1	0	1	3	3	0	3	
3	Zrinjski	2	0	0	2	1	5	−4	0	

27 May 1998

Željezničar	3–0	Bosna
Muharemović 26'; Vazda 53'; Zubanović 81'

Koševo, Sarajevo

30 May 1998

Željezničar	2–1	Zrinjski
Vazda 10'; Zubanović 90'		Prskalo 12'

Koševo, Sarajevo

2 June 1998

Bosna	3–0	Zrinjski
Džafić 64'; Hota 86'; Suljagić 90' (pen.)

Koševo, Sarajevo

==== Group Mostar ====
Pos	Team	Pld	W	D	L	GF	GA	GD	Pts	Qualification
1	Sarajevo	2	1	1	0	2	1	+1	4	Advanced to final
2	Široki Brijeg	2	1	0	1	6	2	+4	3	
3	Čelik	2	0	1	1	2	7	−5	1	

27 May 1998

Široki Brijeg	0–1	Sarajevo
		Gogalić 78'

Bijeli Brijeg, Mostar

30 May 1998

Sarajevo	1–1	Čelik
Smječanin 50' (pen.)		Hajdarević 48'

Bijeli Brijeg, Mostar

2 June 1998

Široki Brijeg	6–1	Čelik
Filipović 34', 41'; Bubalo 40', 61', 73'; Marušić 50'		Hajdarević 31'

Bijeli Brijeg, Mostar

=== Final ===
5 June 1998
20:15 CEST

Sarajevo	0–1	Željezničar
	Report	Zubanović 90'

Koševo, Sarajevo
Attendance: 35,000
Referee: Lutz Michael Fröhlich (Germany)

Both clubs qualified for 1998–99 UEFA Cup.

== See also ==
- 1997–98 First League of the Republika Srpska
