= Dragan Škrba =

Bosnian Serb footballer

Personal information
- Full name: Dragan Škrba
- Date of birth: 26 August 1962 (age 64)
- Place of birth: Petrovići, FPR Yugoslavia
- Height: 6 ft 1 in (1.85 m)
- Position: Goalkeeper

Senior career*
Years	Team	Apps	(Gls)
1981–1992	Željezničar Sarajevo	189	(0)
1992–1995	Portimonense	41	(0)
1995–1997	Pohang Steelers	59	(0)

International career
- Yugoslavia U20
- * Club domestic league appearances and goals

Dragan Škrba (Serbian Cyrillic: Драган Шкрба; born 26 August 1962) is a Bosnian retired goalkeeper.

== Club career ==
Škrba played in 229 official matches for Željezničar Sarajevo and was a well known penalty stopper. He was a part of the great generation which have managed to reach the 1984-1985 UEFA Cup semifinals, which they lost on aggregate due to a very late goal by Videoton defender József Csuhay.
