= Siniša Nikolić =

Yugoslav footballer (born 1967)

Personal information
- Full name: Siniša Nikolić
- Date of birth: October 2, 1967 (age 59)
- Place of birth: Stolac, SR Bosnia and Herzegovina, SFR Yugoslavia
- Position: Midfielder

Senior career*
| Years | Team | Apps | (Gls) |
| 1987–1992 | Željezničar Sarajevo | 78 | (13) |
| 1992–1994 | Atlético CP | | |
| 1994–1995 | Levadiakos | 17 | (3) |
| 1995–1997 | Maribor | 41 | (4) |
| 1998 | FCN St. Pölten | | |
| 1999–2000 | Ialysos | 10 | (0) |
| 2000–2007 | FC Zeltweg | | |
- * Club domestic league appearances and goals

Siniša Nikolić (born 2 October 1967 in Stolac) is a Yugoslav retired football player.

Nikolić played for Željezničar Sarajevo and later, after the Bosnian War broke out, he emigrated abroad where he played for several clubs. While he was playing for Željezničar, he was part of team who in 1989/90 season had beaten Crvena Zvezda with a 3-0 result. Nikolić had assisted in two out of three goals scored that day.
