= Senad Žerić =

Bosnian footballer

Personal information
- Full name: Senad Žerić
- Date of birth: 4 September 1977 (age 49)
- Place of birth: Sarajevo, SFR Yugoslavia
- Height: 1.78 m (5 ft 10 in)
- Position: Striker

Senior career*
Years	Team	Apps	(Gls)
1996-2001	Željezničar	103	(15)
2002	Jedinstvo Bihać		
2002-2006	Željezničar	52	(13)
2006-2007	TOŠK Tešanj		
2007-2008	Dunaújváros		

International career^{‡}
1999-2001	Bosnia and Herzegovina	4	(0)
2001	Bosnia and Herzegovina XI	1	(0)
- * Club domestic league appearances and goals ‡ National team caps and goals as of 24 June 2021

Senad Žerić (born 4 September 1977) is a Bosnian retired football player, who works for the FK Željezničar Youth Academy.

== Club career ==
Born in Sarajevo, he scored 41 goals in 204 matches for hometown club Željezničar.

== International career ==
Žerić made his debut for Bosnia and Herzegovina in an August 1999 friendly match away against Liechtenstein and has earned a total of 5 caps (1 unofficial), scoring no goals. His final international was a January 2001 Millenium Cup match against Serbia and Montenegro.

== Personal life ==
His son Denis Žerić is also a professional footballer.
