= Denis Karić =

Bosnian footballer (born 1972)

Personal information
- Date of birth: 1 December 1972 (age 53)
- Place of birth: Tuzla, SFR Yugoslavia
- Position: Midfielder

Senior career*
Years	Team	Apps	(Gls)
1996–2001	Sloboda Tuzla	132	(1)
2001–2005	Željezničar	96	(1)
2005–2007	Sloboda Tuzla	48	(2)
2007–2009	Bratstvo Gračanica		

International career
2001	Bosnia and Herzegovina	3	(0)
2001	Bosnia and Herzegovina XI	2	(0)

Managerial career
- 2025–2026: Sloboda Tuzla
- * Club domestic league appearances and goals

Denis Karić (born 1 December 1972) is a Bosnian professional football manager and former player.

== Club career ==
Born in Tuzla, Karić debuted for his hometown club Sloboda in 1996. He then played for Željezničar from 2001 until 2005. Karić returned to Sloboda in 2005, before retiring at Bratstvo Gračanica in 2009.

== International career ==
Karić made five appearances for Bosnia and Herzegovina at the June 2001 Merdeka Tournament: an unofficial match against Slovakia marked his international debut and an official international match against Uzbekistan was his final game.

== Post-playing career ==
Karić was re-appointed sporting director at Sloboda Tuzla in May 2018, having previously been sacked by the club in December 2017.
