= Gordan Vidović =

Belgian footballer

Personal information
- Date of birth: 23 June 1968 (age 58)
- Place of birth: Sarajevo, SFR Yugoslavia
- Height: 1.90 m (6 ft 3 in)
- Position: Defender

Youth career
- 1982: Igman Ilidža

Senior career*
Years	Team	Apps	(Gls)
1988–1992	Željezničar Sarajevo	61	(7)
1992	St. Gallen	0	(0)
1993	Tienen	21	(9)
1993–1995	Royal Capellen	60	(56)
1995–2003	Mouscron	182	(45)
Total		324	(117)

International career
1997–1999	Belgium	16	(0)
- * Club domestic league appearances and goals

Gordan Vidović (born 23 June 1968 in Sarajevo, Bosnia and Herzegovina) is a retired football player who played for the Belgium national team.

== Career ==
His first club was FK Igman from Ilidža, suburb of Sarajevo. He was spotted there in 1988, by FK Željezničar Sarajevo and soon moved to this top division club where he played 87 games and scored 16 goals. When the War in Bosnia-Herzegovina started, he went to Swiss FC St. Gallen. After that, he moved to Belgium and played for KVK Tienen and Royal Capellen FC during 60 games (56 goals) where he was the club's best goalscorer. In 1995, he signed a contract with R.E. Mouscron. He played 166 games and scored 37 goals for the club.

This former striker was reconverted to the role of central defender by coach Georges Leekens when he was at Mouscron. Leekens also offered him to play for the Belgium national team. Vidović accepted the offer and he was capped 16 times. Gordan Vidovic was part of the 1998 World Cup squad in France where he played 3 games.
