= Dragomir Racić =

Yugoslav footballer (1945–2019)

Dragan Racić
Personal information
- Full name: Dragomir Racić
- Date of birth: 5 April 1945
- Place of birth: Bačka Topola, FS Serbia, DF Yugoslavia
- Date of death: 17 July 2019 (aged 74)
- Place of death: Budva, Montenegro
- Height: 1.81 m (5 ft 11 in)
- Position: Goalkeeper

Senior career*
Years	Team	Apps	(Gls)
1963–1964	Crvenka		
1964–1966	Borovo	63	(0)
1966–1974	Red Star Belgrade	21	(0)
1972–1973	→ Sutjeska Nikšić (loan)	42	(0)
1974–1982	Castellón	266	(8)
Total		392	(8)
- * Club domestic league appearances and goals

Dragomir "Dragan" Racić (Serbian Cyrillic: Драгомир Драган Рацић; 5 April 1945 – 17 July 2019) was a Yugoslav and Serbian professional footballer who played as a goalkeeper.

== Career ==
After spending two seasons with Borovo in the Yugoslav Second League, Racić earned a transfer to Yugoslav First League side Red Star Belgrade in 1966. He mostly served as a backup for Ratomir Dujković, helping them win three consecutive championship titles (1968, 1969, and 1970) and two national cups (1968 and 1970). After completing his military service, Racić was sent on loan to Sutjeska Nikšić during the 1971–72 winter transfer window, remaining at the club until the summer of 1973.

In 1974, Racić moved abroad to Spain and signed with newly relegated Segunda División side Castellón, spending the rest of his career at the club. He helped them win the 1980–81 Segunda División, earning promotion to the top flight after seven years.

== Honours ==
Red Star Belgrade

- Yugoslav First League: 1967–68, 1968–69, 1969–70
- Yugoslav Cup: 1967–68, 1969–70
- Mitropa Cup: 1967–68

Castellón

- Segunda División: 1980–81
