= 1967–68 Yugoslav Cup =

1968 Yugoslav Football Cup
21st Marshal Tito Cup
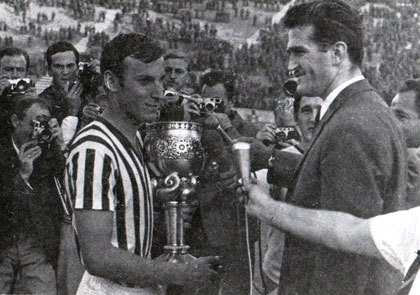
- Captain of Red Star, Dragan Džajić, holding the 1968 Marshal Tito's Cup

Tournament details
- Country: Yugoslavia
- Dates: 3 March – 22 May
- Teams: 16

Final positions
- Champions: Red Star (7th title)
- Runners-up: Bor
- Cup Winners' Cup: Red Star

Tournament statistics
- Matches played: 15
- Goals scored: 50 (3.33 per match)
- Goals scored in penalty shoot-outs not included.

The 1967–68 Yugoslav Cup was the 21st season of the top football knockout competition in SFR Yugoslavia, the Yugoslav Cup (Serbo-Croatian: Kup Jugoslavije), also known as the "Marshal Tito Cup" (Kup Maršala Tita), since its establishment in 1946.

== First round proper ==
In the following tables winning teams are marked in bold; teams from outside top level are indicated with Roman numerals, corresponding to their league.

Tie no	Home team	Score	Away team
1	**Borovo** (II)	6–0	Jedinstvo Bihać (III)
2	**Maribor**	3–1	Budućnost Titograd (II)
3	**OFK Beograd**	1–0	Rijeka
4	**Proleter Zrenjanin**	1–0	Vardar
5	Radnički Niš	2–3 (a.e.t.)	**Bor** (II)
6	**Red Star**	3–1	NK Zagreb
7	**Sloboda Tuzla** (II)	2–2 (6–4 p)	Šibenik (II)
8	**Vojvodina**	2–0	Partizan

== Quarter-finals ==
Tie no	Home team	Score	Away team
1	Borovo (II)	0–2	**Red Star**
2	**Bor** (II)	3–1	Sloboda Tuzla (II)
3	**Maribor**	1–0	OFK Beograd
4	**Vojvodina**	3–0	Proleter Zrenjanin

== Semi-finals ==
Tie no	Home team	Score	Away team
1	**Bor** (II)	2–1	Vojvodina
2	**Red Star**	2–1	Maribor

== Final ==
22 May 1968

Red Star	7–0	Bor
Ostojić 35', 47', 72'; Džajić 62', 75'; Lazarević 64', 67'

Stadion Crvena Zvezda, Belgrade
Attendance: 10,000
Referee: Ratko Čanak (Belgrade)

RED STAR:
GK	1	(Socialist Federal Republic of Yugoslavia) Ratomir Dujković
	2	(Socialist Federal Republic of Yugoslavia) Milovan Đorić
	3	(Socialist Federal Republic of Yugoslavia) Petar Krivokuća
	4	(Socialist Federal Republic of Yugoslavia) Miroslav Pavlović
	5	(Socialist Federal Republic of Yugoslavia) Kiril Dojčinovski
	6	(Socialist Federal Republic of Yugoslavia) Slobodan Škrbić
	7	(Socialist Federal Republic of Yugoslavia) Stevan Ostojić
	8	(Socialist Federal Republic of Yugoslavia) Zoran Antonijević
	9	(Socialist Federal Republic of Yugoslavia) Vojin Lazarević
	10	(Socialist Federal Republic of Yugoslavia) Jovan Aćimović
	11	(Socialist Federal Republic of Yugoslavia) Dragan Džajić
Manager:
(Socialist Federal Republic of Yugoslavia) Miljan Miljanić

BOR:
GK	1	(Socialist Federal Republic of Yugoslavia) Jovan Hajduković
	2	(Socialist Federal Republic of Yugoslavia) Pavao Reisner
	3	(Socialist Federal Republic of Yugoslavia) Desimir Ranković
	4	(Socialist Federal Republic of Yugoslavia) Slobodan Perišić
	5	(Socialist Federal Republic of Yugoslavia) Nemanja Radulović
	6	(Socialist Federal Republic of Yugoslavia) Đorđe Živanović
	7	(Socialist Federal Republic of Yugoslavia) Tomislav Petrović
	8	(Socialist Federal Republic of Yugoslavia) Dušan Sopić
	9	(Socialist Federal Republic of Yugoslavia) Ištvan Šorban
	10	(Socialist Federal Republic of Yugoslavia) Slobodan Tomić
	11	(Socialist Federal Republic of Yugoslavia) Franc Paulinc
Manager:
(Socialist Federal Republic of Yugoslavia) Radojica Radojičić

== See also ==
- 1967–68 Yugoslav First League
- 1967–68 Yugoslav Second League
