= 1962–63 Yugoslav Second League =

Yugoslav Second League
- Season: 1962–63
- Champions: Trešnjevka (West Division); Vardar (East Division)
- Promoted: Trešnjevka; Vardar
- Relegated: RNK Split; Rudar Kakanj; Karlovac; Radnički Kragujevac; Mačva Šabac; Budućnost Peć

The 1962–63 Yugoslav Second League season was the 17th season of the Second Federal League (Serbo-Croatian: Druga savezna liga), the second level association football competition of SFR Yugoslavia, since its establishment in 1946. The league was contested in two regional groups (West Division and East Division), with 16 clubs each, four more than in the previous season.

== West Division ==
=== Teams ===
A total of sixteen teams contested the league, including ten sides from the 1961–62 season, one club relegated from the 1961–62 Yugoslav First League and five sides promoted from the third tier leagues played in the 1961–62 season. The league was contested in a double round robin format, with each club playing every other club twice, for a total of 30 rounds. Two points were awarded for wins and one point for draws.

Borac Banja Luka were relegated from the 1961–62 Yugoslav First League after finishing in the 12th place of the league table and losing in the relegation play-offs against Sloboda. The five clubs promoted to the second level were BSK Slavonski Brod, Famos Hrasnica, Istra, Olimpija Ljubljana and Rudar Kakanj.

Locations of teams' home cities in the 1962–63 Yugoslav Second League West

Team	Location	Federal subject	Position in 1961–62
Borac Banja Luka	Banja Luka	SR Bosnia and Herzegovina	—
Borovo	Borovo Naselje	SR Croatia	10th
BSK Slavonski Brod	Slavonski Brod	SR Croatia	—
Čelik	Zenica	SR Bosnia and Herzegovina	4th
Famos Hrasnica	Hrasnica	SR Bosnia and Herzegovina	—
Istra	Pula	SR Croatia	—
Karlovac	Karlovac	SR Croatia	6th
Lokomotiva	Zagreb	SR Croatia	11th
Maribor	Maribor	SR Slovenia	5th
Olimpija Ljubljana	Ljubljana	SR Slovenia	—
Slavonija Osijek	Osijek	SR Croatia	7th
Rudar Kakanj	Kakanj	SR Bosnia and Herzegovina	—
RNK Split	Split	SR Croatia	8th
Šibenik	Šibenik	SR Croatia	9th
Trešnjevka	Zagreb	SR Croatia	3rd
Varteks	Varaždin	SR Croatia	12th

=== League table ===
Pos	Team	Pld	W	D	L	GF	GA	GR	Pts	Promotion or relegation
1	Trešnjevka (C, P)	30	18	4	8	66	39	1.692	40	Promotion to Yugoslav First League
2	Čelik	30	14	8	8	42	34	1.235	36	
3	Maribor	30	12	11	7	52	33	1.576	35	
4	Slavonija	30	13	8	9	47	37	1.270	34	
5	Varteks	30	11	9	10	38	30	1.267	31	
6	Olimpija	30	11	9	10	43	38	1.132	31	
7	Šibenik	30	13	3	14	56	51	1.098	29	
8	Lokomotiva	30	11	7	12	50	45	1.111	29	
9	Borovo	30	11	7	12	34	36	0.944	29	
10	Famos Hrasnica	30	10	9	11	42	47	0.894	29	
11	Istra Pula	30	11	7	12	43	59	0.729	29	
12	Borac Banja Luka	30	10	8	12	42	44	0.955	28	
13	BSK Slavonski Brod	30	10	8	12	41	50	0.820	28	
14	RNK Split (R)	30	11	6	13	35	43	0.814	28	Relegation to Third Level
15	Rudar Kakanj (R)	30	9	7	14	27	47	0.574	25	Relegation to Third Level
16	Karlovac (R)	30	5	9	16	24	49	0.490	19	Relegation to Third Level

Source: fsgzrenjanin.com
Rules for classification: 1st points; 2nd goal average.
(C) Champions; (P) Promoted; (R) Relegated

== East Division ==
=== Teams ===
A total of sixteen teams contested the league, including nine sides from the 1961–62 season, one club relegated from the 1961–62 Yugoslav First League and six sides promoted from the third tier leagues played in the 1961–62 season. The league was contested in a double round robin format, with each club playing every other club twice, for a total of 30 rounds. Two points were awarded for wins and one point for draws.

Vardar were relegated from the 1961–62 Yugoslav First League after finishing in the 11th place of the league table and losing in the relegation play-offs against Radnički Niš. The six clubs promoted to the second level were Bačka, Borac Čačak, Budućnost Peć, Jedinstvo Zemun, OFK Subotica and Železničar Niš.

Locations of teams' home cities in the 1962–63 Yugoslav Second League East

Team	Location	Federal subject	Position in 1961–62
Bačka	Bačka Palanka	(Socialist Republic of Serbia) SAP Vojvodina	—
Borac Čačak	Čačak	SR Serbia	—
Budućnost Peć	Peć	(Socialist Republic of Serbia) SAP Kosovo	—
Jedinstvo Zemun	Zemun	SR Serbia	—
Mačva Šabac	Šabac	SR Serbia	8th
OFK Subotica	Subotica	(Socialist Republic of Serbia) SAP Vojvodina	—
Priština	Pristina	(Socialist Republic of Serbia) SAP Kosovo	10th
Proleter Zrenjanin	Zrenjanin	(Socialist Republic of Serbia) SAP Vojvodina	6th
Radnički Belgrade	Belgrade	SR Serbia	3rd
Radnički Kragujevac	Kragujevac	SR Serbia	12th
Spartak Subotica	Subotica	(Socialist Republic of Serbia) SAP Vojvodina	5th
Srem	Sremska Mitrovica	(Socialist Republic of Serbia) SAP Vojvodina	4th
Sutjeska	Nikšić	SR Montenegro	7th
Trepča	Kosovska Mitrovica	(Socialist Republic of Serbia) SAP Kosovo	9th
Vardar	Skopje	SR Macedonia	—
Železničar Niš	Niš	SR Serbia	—

=== League table ===
Pos	Team	Pld	W	D	L	GF	GA	GR	Pts	Promotion or relegation
1	Vardar (C, P)	30	18	8	4	50	24	2.083	44	Promotion to Yugoslav First League
2	Radnički Beograd	30	15	8	7	44	25	1.760	38	
3	Trepča	30	14	8	8	53	38	1.395	36	
4	Sutjeska Nikšić	30	13	8	9	63	45	1.400	34	
5	Prishtina	30	11	9	10	45	43	1.047	31	
6	Bačka 1901	30	12	7	11	51	49	1.041	31	
7	OFK Subotica	30	10	9	11	43	47	0.915	29	
8	Spartak Subotica	30	11	7	12	32	44	0.727	29	
9	Proleter Zrenjanin	30	10	8	12	39	38	1.026	28	
10	Borac Čačak	30	9	10	11	36	38	0.947	28	
11	Jedinstvo Zemun	30	9	10	11	38	44	0.864	28	
12	Železničar Niš	30	12	4	14	39	48	0.813	28	
13	Srem	30	11	6	13	39	49	0.796	28	
14	Radnički Kragujevac (R)	30	10	6	14	47	48	0.979	26	Relegation to Third Level
15	Mačva Šabac (R)	30	11	4	15	36	39	0.923	26	Relegation to Third Level
16	Budućnost Peć (R)	30	4	8	18	26	62	0.419	16	Relegation to Third Level

Source: fsgzrenjanin.com
Rules for classification: 1st points; 2nd goal average.
(C) Champions; (P) Promoted; (R) Relegated

== See also ==
- 1962–63 Yugoslav First League
- 1962–63 Yugoslav Cup
