= 1967–68 Yugoslav Second League =

Yugoslav Second League
- Season: 1967–68
- Champions: Čelik (West Division); Bor (East Division)
- Promoted: Čelik; Bor
- Relegated: None

The 1967–68 Yugoslav Second League season was the 22nd season of the Second Federal League (Serbo-Croatian: Druga savezna liga), the second level association football competition of SFR Yugoslavia, since its establishment in 1946. The league was contested in two regional groups (West Division and East Division), with 18 clubs each. There were no teams relegated at the end of the season, as the league changed its format and from following season was divided in four groups with 16 clubs each.

== West Division ==
=== Teams ===
A total of eighteen teams contested the league, including fourteen sides from the 1966–67 season, one club relegated from the 1966–67 Yugoslav First League and three sides promoted from the third-tier leagues played in the 1966–67 season. The league was contested in a double round robin format, with each club playing every other club twice, for a total of 34 rounds. Two points were awarded for wins and one point for draws.

Čelik were relegated from the 1966–67 Yugoslav First League after finishing in the 16th place of the league table. The three clubs promoted to the second level were Belišće, Rudar Ljubija and RNK Split.

Locations of teams' home cities in the 1967–68 Yugoslav Second League West

Team	Location	Federal subject	Position in 1965–66
Aluminij	Kidričevo	SR Slovenia	11th
Belišće	Belišće	SR Croatia	—N/a
Borac Banja Luka	Banja Luka	SR Bosnia and Herzegovina	15th
Borovo	Borovo Naselje	SR Croatia	8th
Bratstvo Travnik	Travnik	SR Bosnia and Herzegovina	6th
BSK Slavonski Brod	Slavonski Brod	SR Croatia	13th
Čelik	Zenica	SR Bosnia and Herzegovina	—N/a
Famos Hrasnica	Hrasnica	SR Bosnia and Herzegovina	12th
Leotar	Trebinje	SR Bosnia and Herzegovina	7th
Lokomotiva Zagreb	Zagreb	SR Croatia	4th
Osijek	Osijek	SR Croatia	2nd
Rudar Kakanj	Kakanj	SR Bosnia and Herzegovina	10th
Rudar Ljubija	Prijedor	SR Bosnia and Herzegovina	—N/a
Sloboda	Tuzla	SR Bosnia and Herzegovina	3rd
RNK Split	Split	SR Croatia	—N/a
Šibenik	Šibenik	SR Croatia	5th
Trešnjevka	Zagreb	SR Croatia	9th
Varteks	Varaždin	SR Croatia	14th

=== League table ===
Pos	Team	Pld	W	D	L	GF	GA	GD	Pts	Promotion
1	Čelik (C, P)	34	24	5	5	82	15	+67	53	Promotion to Yugoslav First League
2	Sloboda Tuzla	34	21	9	4	54	21	+33	51	
3	Osijek	34	15	9	10	46	27	+19	39	
4	Rudar Ljubija	34	17	3	14	54	47	+7	37	
5	Famos Hrasnica	34	14	7	13	45	35	+10	35	
6	Borovo	34	13	9	12	48	43	+5	35	
7	Borac Banja Luka	34	13	8	13	54	48	+6	34	
8	RNK Split	34	14	6	14	46	57	−11	34	
9	Belišće	34	14	5	15	44	50	−6	33	
10	Bratstvo Travnik	34	14	5	15	44	50	−6	33	
11	Leotar	34	9	14	11	35	44	−9	32	
12	Rudar Kakanj	34	14	4	16	55	70	−15	32	
13	Varteks	34	12	7	15	43	45	−2	31	
14	Lokomotiva Zagreb	34	11	9	14	39	45	−6	31	
15	Šibenik	34	14	3	17	45	53	−8	31	
16	BSK Slavonski Brod	34	12	5	17	51	56	−5	29	
17	Trešnjevka	34	9	10	15	43	61	−18	28	
18	Aluminij	34	4	6	24	32	84	−52	14	

Source: fsgzrenjanin.com
Rules for classification: 1) points; 2) goal difference; 3) number of goals scored.
(C) Champions; (P) Promoted

== East Division ==
=== Teams ===
A total of eighteen teams contested the league, including fourteen sides from the 1966–67 season, one club relegated from the 1966–67 Yugoslav First League and three sides promoted from the third-tier leagues played in the 1966–67 season. The league was contested in a double round robin format, with each club playing every other club twice, for a total of 34 rounds. Two points were awarded for wins and one point for draws.

Sutjeska were relegated from the 1966–67 Yugoslav First League after finishing in the 15th place of the league table. The three clubs promoted to the second level were Bregalnica Štip, Sloga Kraljevo and Srem.

Locations of teams' home cities in the 1967–68 Yugoslav Second League East

Team	Location	Federal subject	Position in 1966–67
Bačka	Bačka Palanka	(Socialist Republic of Serbia) SAP Vojvodina	15th
Bor	Bor	SR Serbia	8th
Borac Čačak	Čačak	SR Serbia	12th
Bregalnica Štip	Štip	SR Macedonia	—N/a
Budućnost	Titograd	SR Montenegro	10th
Crvenka	Crvenka	(Socialist Republic of Serbia) SAP Vojvodina	14th
Lovćen	Cetinje	SR Montenegro	13th
Pobeda	Prilep	SR Macedonia	9th
Prishtina	Pristina	(Socialist Republic of Serbia) SAP Kosovo	2nd
Radnički Kragujevac	Kragujevac	SR Serbia	11th
Radnički Sombor	Sombor	(Socialist Republic of Serbia) SAP Vojvodina	3rd
Sloboda Titovo Užice	Titovo Užice	SR Serbia	7th
Sloga Kraljevo	Kraljevo	SR Serbia	—N/a
Spartak Subotica	Subotica	(Socialist Republic of Serbia) SAP Vojvodina	5th
Srem	Sremska Mitrovica	(Socialist Republic of Serbia) SAP Vojvodina	—N/a
Sutjeska	Nikšić	SR Montenegro	—N/a
Trepča	Kosovska Mitrovica	(Socialist Republic of Serbia) SAP Kosovo	4th
Voždovački	Belgrade	SR Serbia	6th

=== League table ===
Pos	Team	Pld	W	D	L	GF	GA	GD	Pts	Promotion
1	Bor (C, P)	34	19	6	9	52	29	+23	44	Promotion to Yugoslav First League
2	Trepča	34	17	6	11	59	33	+26	40	
3	Sloga Kraljevo	34	18	4	12	56	43	+13	40	
4	Budućnost	34	16	6	12	49	36	+13	38	
5	Bačka	34	15	4	15	53	41	+12	34	
6	Radnički Sombor	34	13	8	13	48	51	−3	34	
7	Prishtina	34	14	6	14	44	47	−3	34	
8	Lovćen	34	14	6	14	41	47	−6	34	
9	Crvenka	34	15	3	16	67	61	+6	33	
10	Pobeda	34	13	7	14	46	46	0	33	
11	Radnički Kragujevac	34	14	5	15	43	45	−2	33	
12	Spartak Subotica	34	12	9	13	45	48	−3	33	
13	Srem	34	14	5	15	48	55	−7	33	
14	Sloboda Titovo Užice	34	12	8	14	38	43	−5	32	
15	Borac Čačak	34	12	8	14	36	41	−5	32	
16	Sutjeska Nikšić	34	12	6	16	63	77	−14	30	
17	Bregalnica Shtip	34	12	6	16	50	78	−28	30	
18	Voždovački	34	7	11	16	48	65	−17	25	

Source: fsgzrenjanin.com
Rules for classification: 1) points; 2) goal difference; 3) number of goals scored.
(C) Champions; (P) Promoted

== See also ==
- 1967–68 Yugoslav First League
- 1967–68 Yugoslav Cup
