= Pavle Obradović =

Serbian association football player

Personal information
- Full name: Pavle Obradović
- Date of birth: 4 July 2001 (age 25)
- Place of birth: Gornji Milanovac, FR Yugoslavia
- Height: 1.97 m (6 ft 6 in)
- Position: Centre-forward

Team information
- Current team: Bor

Youth career
- Borac Čačak
- 2019–2021: Strasbourg

Senior career*
Years	Team	Apps	(Gls)
2018–2019	Borac Čačak	16	(0)
2019–2021	Strasbourg B	8	(3)
2021–2024	Emirates	3	(0)
2021–2022	→ Al Taawon (loan)	8	(0)
2024–2025	FC Petržalka	13	(1)
2026–	Bor	5	(2)
- * Club domestic league appearances and goals as of 16 April 2026

Pavle Obradović (Serbian Cyrillic: Павле Обрадовић; born 4 July 2001) is a Serbian professional footballer who plays for Bor.

== Career statistics ==
As of 1 July 2019

Club	Season	League			Cup		Continental		Other		Total	
Club	Season	Division	Apps	Goals	Apps	Goals	Apps	Goals	Apps	Goals	Apps	Goals
Borac Čačak	2018–19	Serbian First League	16	0	0	0	—		—		16	0
Career total			16	0	0	0	—		—		16	0
