= Marcel Žigante =

Yugoslav-Croatian football manager and player

Personal information
- Date of birth: 30 October 1929
- Place of birth: Rijeka, Kingdom of Yugoslavia
- Date of death: 8 March 2015 (aged 85)
- Place of death: Rijeka, Croatia
- Position: Right winger

Youth career
- 1943–1945: Šparta Zagreb

Senior career*
Years	Team	Apps	(Gls)
1945	Dinamo Zagreb		
1948–1949	Čapljina		
1949–1955	Sarajevo	96	(25)
1955–1956	Radnički Beograd	4	(0)
1957–1960	Željezničar	41	(11)

Managerial career
- 1962–1963: Famos Hrasnica
- 1963–1964: Rudar Kakanj
- 1965–1966: Leotar
- 1966–1967: Željezničar
- 1968–1972: Bor
- 1972–1973: Rijeka
- 1973–1974: Orijent
- 1974–1975: Čelik Zenica
- * Club domestic league appearances and goals

Marcel Žigante (30 October 1929 – 8 March 2015) was a Yugoslav and Croatian professional football manager and player.

== Playing career ==
Born in Rijeka, Kingdom of Yugoslavia, present day Croatia, Žigante's football career began in a small club called Šparta Zagreb in 1943. After the end of World War II, he started playing for Dinamo Zagreb in 1945. He did not stay there for long though. First, Žigante went to Čapljina and then, in 1949, he joined Sarajevo. He played there until 1955, during which time he collected 96 league appearances. Žigante then played with Radnički Beograd as they reached 3rd place in the 1955–56 Yugoslav First League season.

His next club was Sarajevo's fierce city rival Željezničar. He played in 41 league games and scored 11 goals for the club during his three-year tenure. Žigante decided to end his playing career in 1960 after leaving Željezničar. He is remembered as one of the best right wingers during the 1940s and 1950s in Yugoslavia.

== Managerial career ==
Although he was a geography teacher as well, Žigante stayed in football as a manager. He was first manager of Famos Hrasnica (1962–1963) during which time they got promoted to the Yugoslav Second League. After that, he was the manager of Rudar Kakanj (1963–1964) and Leotar (1965–1966). In 1966, Žigante returned to Željezničar where he was one of the creators of a great generation of players that won the Yugoslav First League in 1972 alongside Milan Ribar. He worked as the manager of Željezničar in the 1966–67 and 1967–68 seasons.

In 1968, he became the new manager of Bor (left during the 1971–72 season). Žigante then managed Rijeka (1972–1973) and Čelik Zenica (1974–1975), with whom he won the UEFA Intertoto Cup in 1975.

== Death ==
Žigante died on Sunday, 8 March 2015, in his hometown of Rijeka, Croatia.

== Honours ==
=== Manager ===
Čelik Zenica

- UEFA Intertoto Cup: 1975 (joint)
