= Perlich (Germanic) =

Perlich which is variant surname to Perlick, which is an Old High German surname, which means bero lih = ‘bear-like’.

Perlich is not to be confused with the South Slavic surname Perlich.

== Notable people ==
- Martin Perlich (born 1937), American broadcaster and writer
- Max Perlich (born 1968), American actor
