= US Monastir (football) =

Tunisian association football club

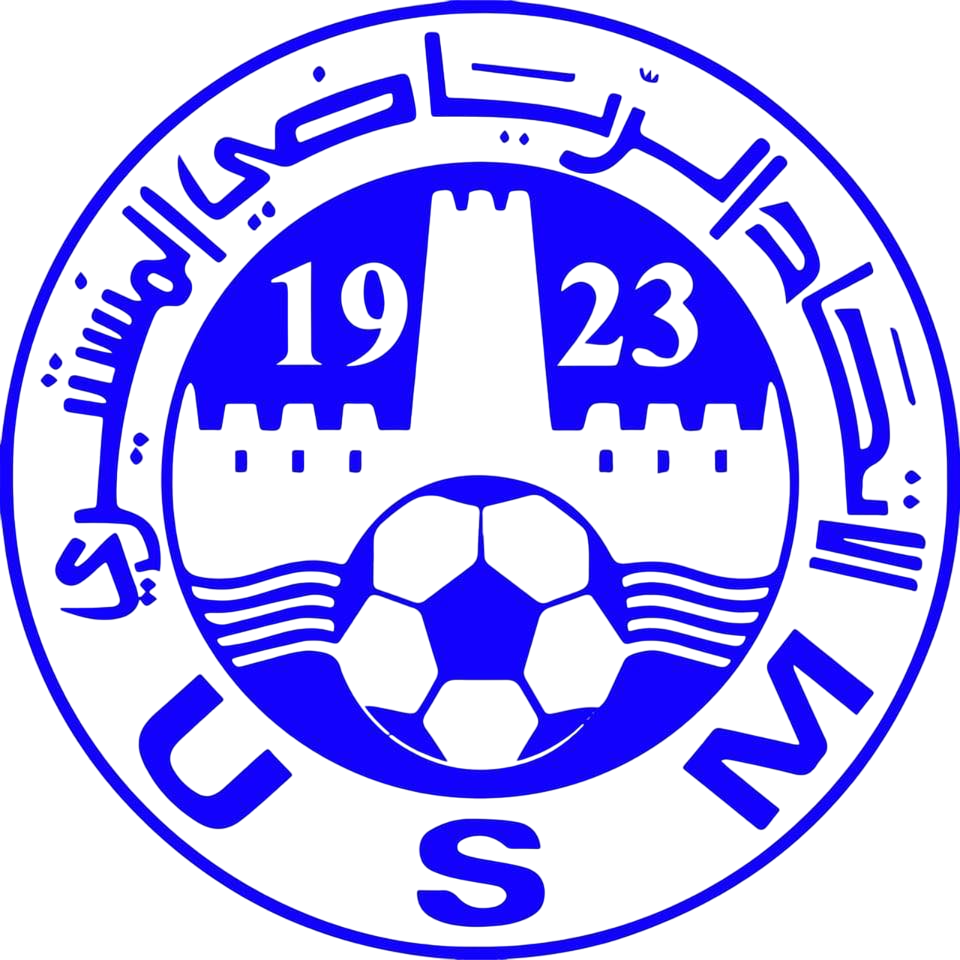
- Full name: Union Sportive Monastirienne
- Nicknames: فريق عاصمة الرباط (Capital of Ribat's Team) الأزرق والأبيض (The Blue & White)
- Short name: USM
- Founded: 17 March 1923
- Stadium: Mustapha Ben Jannet Stadium
- Capacity: 20,000
- Chairman: Mohamed Slama
- Manager: Romain Folz
- League: Tunisian Ligue Professionnelle 1
- 2025–26: Ligue 1, 5th of 16
- Website: usmonastir.org.tn
Home colours	Away colours

Union Sportive Monastirienne (Arabic: الاتحاد الرياضي المنستيري), known as US Monastir or simply USM, is a Tunisian football club based in Monastir. The club was founded in 1923, and its colours are blue and white. Their home stadium, Mustapha Ben Jannet Stadium, has a capacity of 20,000 spectators. The club currently competes in the Tunisian Ligue Professionnelle 1. The club has historical ties to Monastirian nationalists, such as Mustapha Ben Jannet. US Monastir have won two major trophies in its history: the Tunisian Cup and the Tunisian Super Cup, both in 2020.

== History ==
=== Foundation and pre-independence (1923–1956) ===
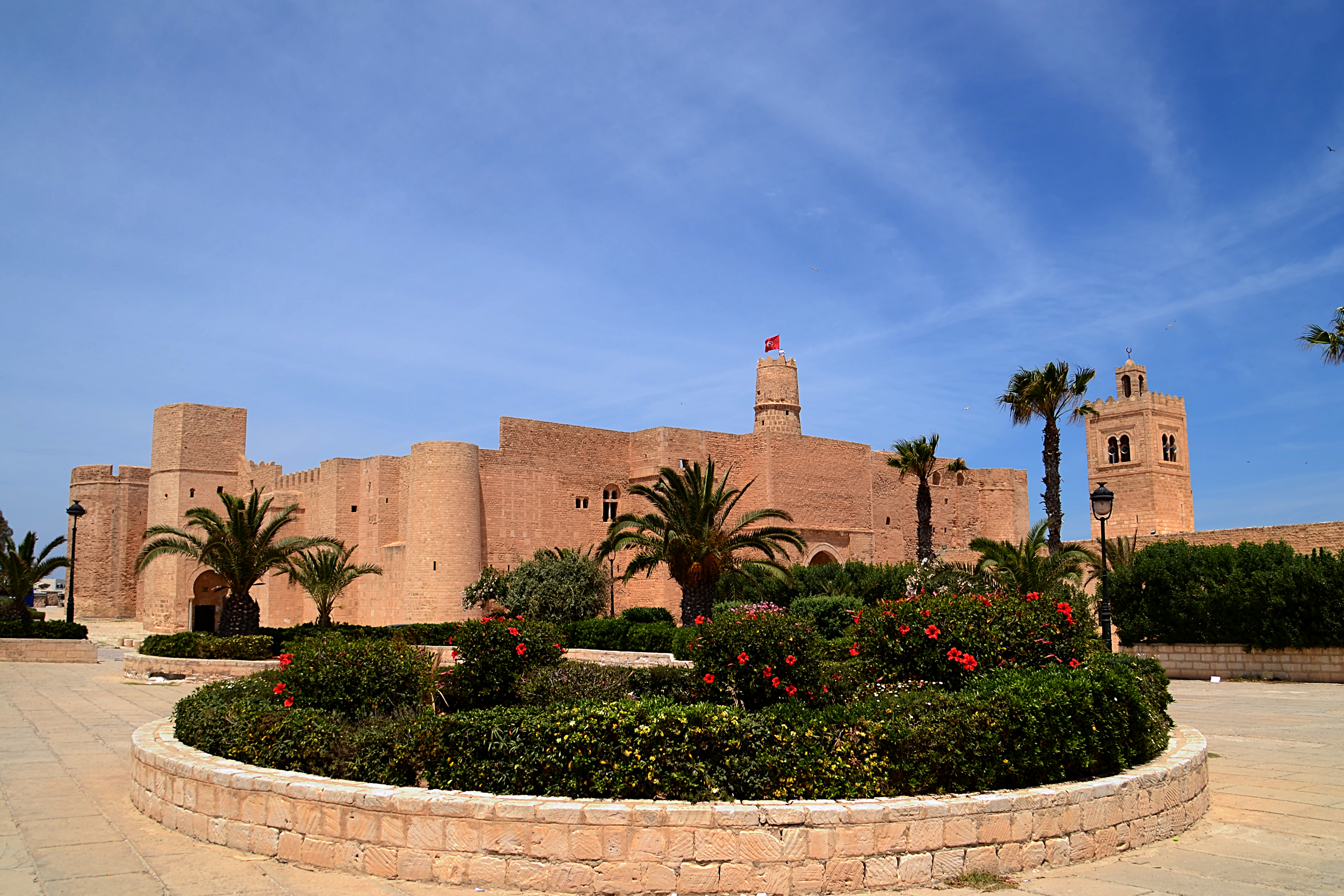
Ribat of Monastir, the monument that gave the nickname of the team.

Union Sportive Monastirienne (USM) was founded on 17 March 1923 with a credit balance of 5,395 Tunisian francs. Following World War II, the club saw a resurgence in interest and enthusiasm for football among the people of Monastir. This led to the club's roster expanding to over one hundred players, with half of them playing for the senior team and the other half competing in the junior categories. Despite this growth, the following years proved to be more difficult for the club.

=== Post-independence (1956–1979) ===
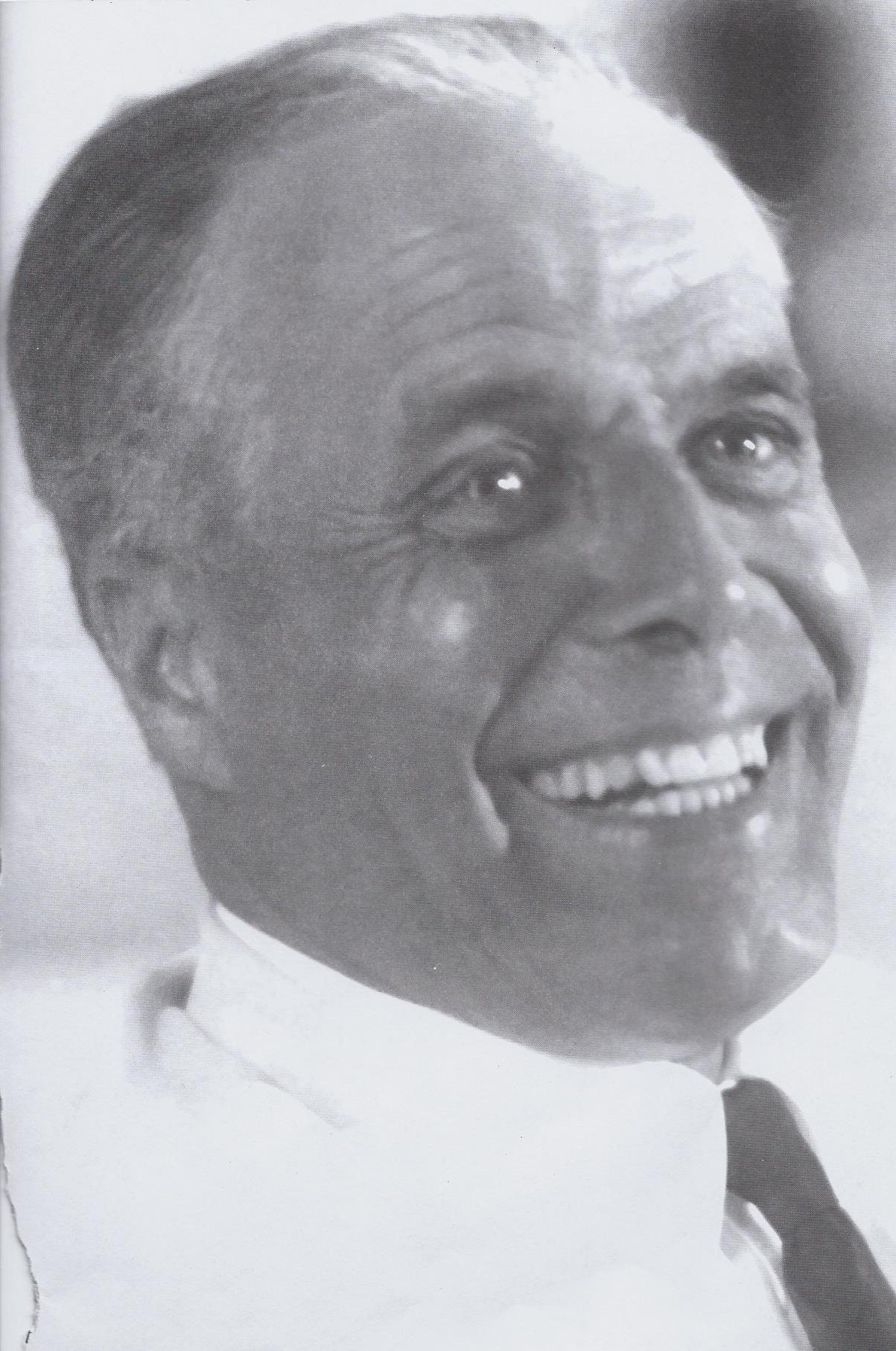
Habib Bourguiba, the first president of Tunisia, supported USM after independence.

Following Tunisia's independence, US Monastir underwent a significant turning point. On the field, the club did not win any titles in the Tunisian Cup or the league during this period. However, USM consistently bounced back; after several relegations, the team managed to return to the first division. It was during the 1961–1962 season that USM reached the national division for the first time, having previously spent two seasons in the third division (1957–1958 and 1958–1959) and one season (1959–1960) in the Honor Division.

=== Results between rise and fall (1980–2018) ===
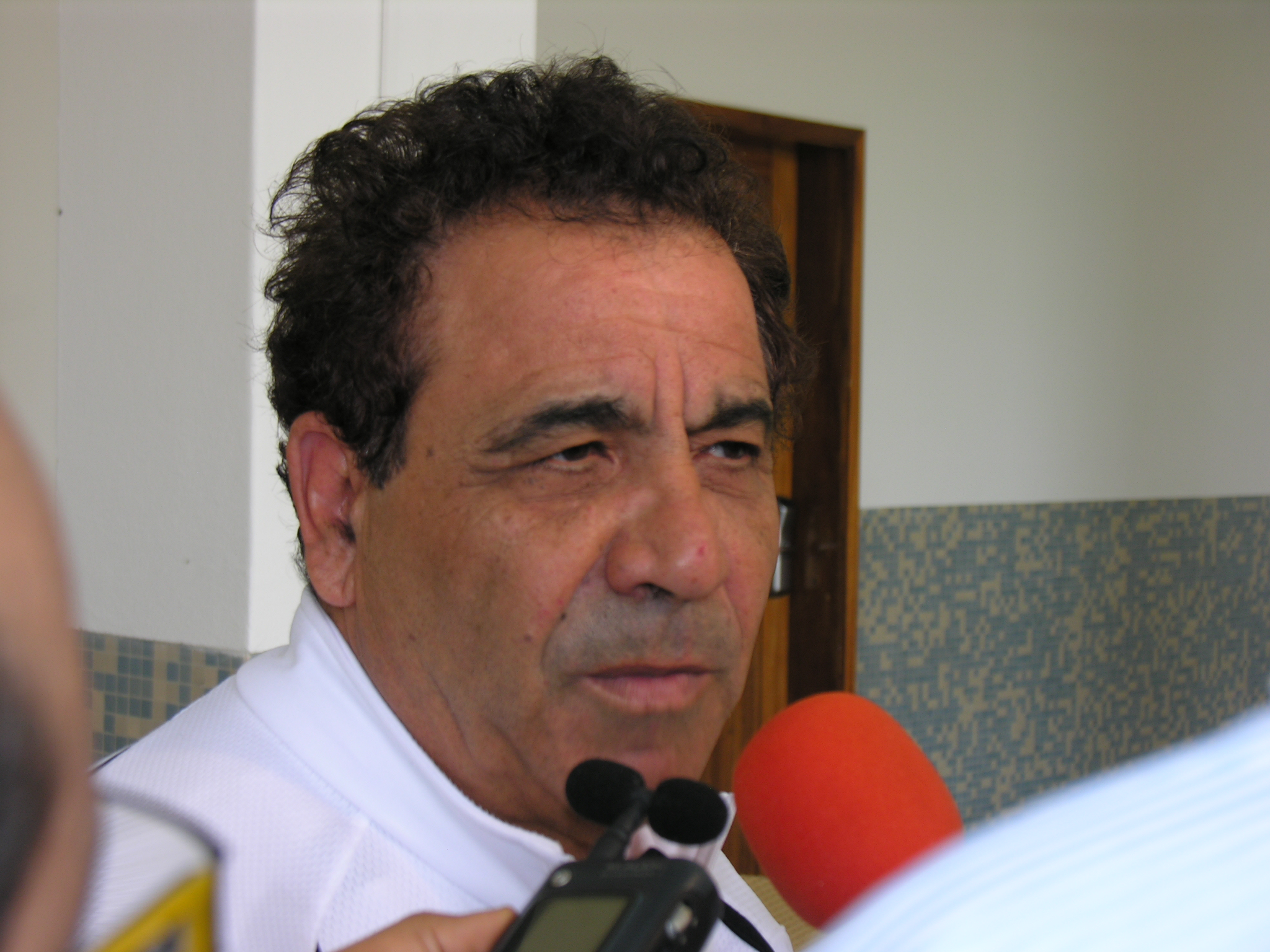
The club's son, Faouzi Benzarti, is the most successful Tunisian coach.

The 1980s marked a significant turning point for US Monastir, as the club became semi-professional, enabling the team to remain in the national division for fourteen consecutive years. During this period, USM also reached the semi-finals of the Tunisian Cup but were defeated 1–0 by Club Africain in Monastir after extra time. With a record of eight wins, eight losses, and ten draws, USM secured a solid fifth-place finish.However, this stability was short-lived.Since 1993–1994 season proved to be extremely challenging, particularly in terms of resources. Four coaches took charge in succession as the team struggled with numerous issues.

In July 2006, Néji Stambouli succeeded Zouhair Chaouch, who had served as president for six years.

On 3 May 2009, after a 3–2 victory against Espérance Sportive de Tunis at Stade El Menzah, USM qualified for their first-ever Tunisian Cup final. The final, held on 24 May at the Hammadi Agrebi Stadium in Radès, saw USM face CS Sfaxien, with CS Sfaxien winning 1–0 in the presence of President Zine El Abidine Ben Ali.

In the following years, USM's league position fluctuated between fifth and tenth place, until 2017.

Following the appointment of coaches Skandar Kasri and Lassaad Dridi, the team delivered solid performances, finishing the 2017/2018 season in sixth place and the 2018/2019 season in seventh place.

=== Golden generation (2019–) ===
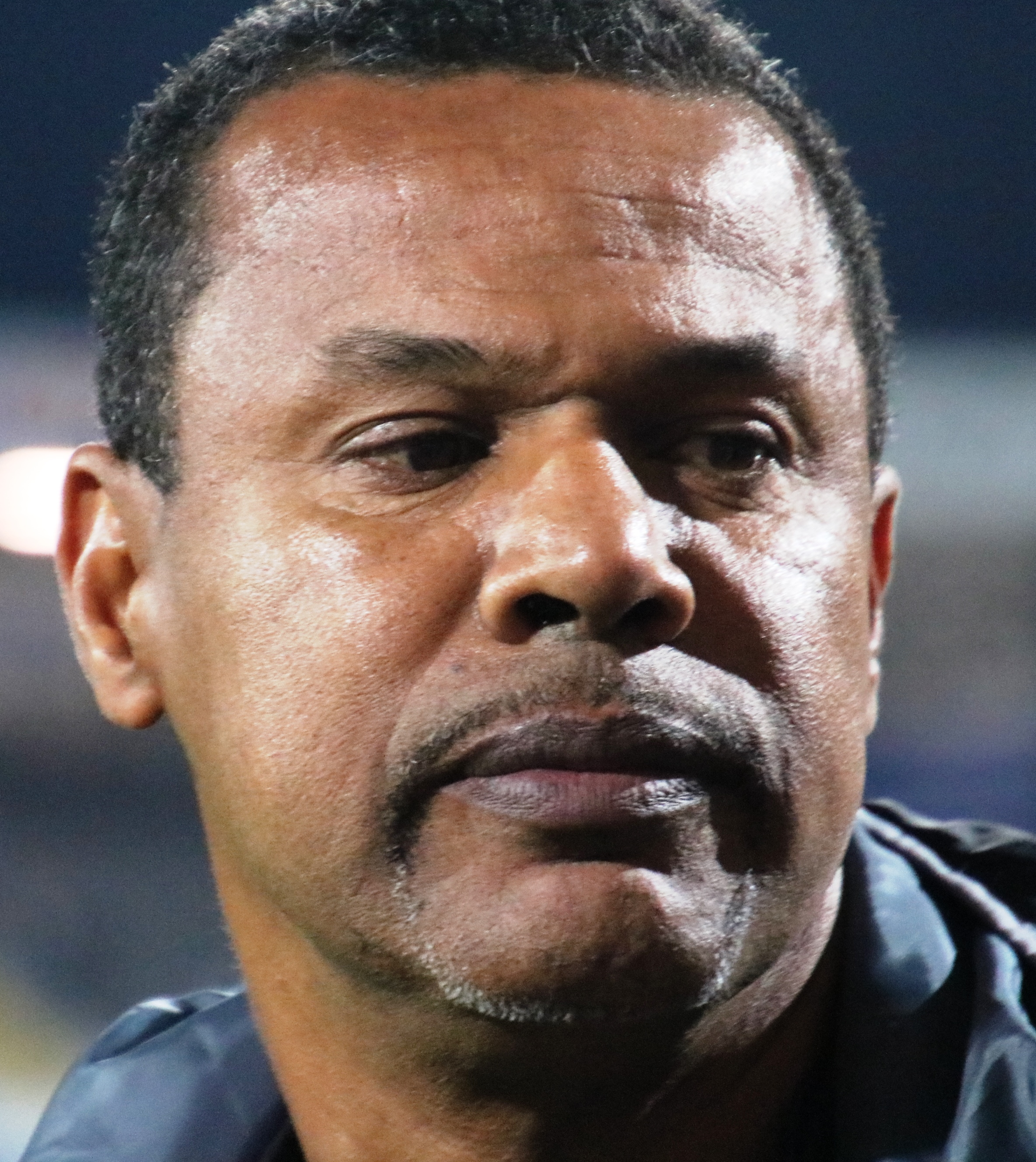
Lassaad Chabbi guided the team to win their first Tunisian Cup.

At the start of the 2019 season, US Monastir signed a contract with coach Lassaad Chabbi. During the 2019–2020 season, the team secured third place in the national league, which qualified them for continental competition for the first time in their history—the 2020–21 CAF Confederation Cup ,then the 2022–23 CAF Champions League , 2022–23 CAF Confederation Cup , the 2024–25 CAF Champions League and the 2025–26 CAF Champions League.

In the Tunisian Cup, renamed the Habib Bourguiba Cup in honor of the 20th anniversary of his passing, USM won the competition for the first time in its history, defeating Espérance de Tunis 2–0 in the final, on 27 September 2020.

After Chabbi's resignation as head coach, Afouène Gharbi took over, leading the team to a tenth-place finish. The club then appointed Mourad Okbi, who led them to their second-ever title by winning the Tunisian Super Cup,on 18 September 2021.

== Honours ==
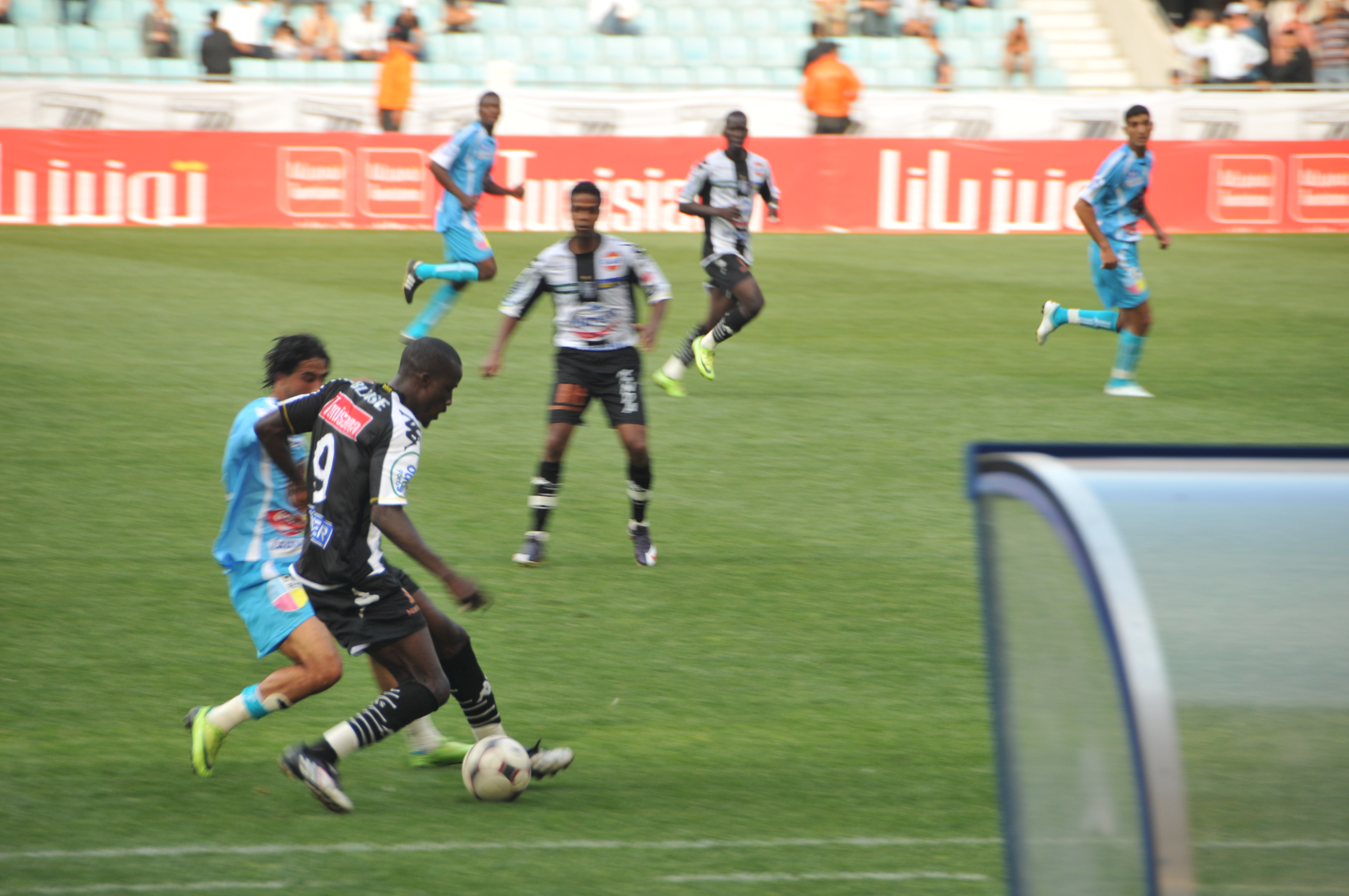
2009 Tunisian Cup Final between CS Sfaxien and US Monastir.

- Tunisian Ligue Professionnelle 1

Runner-up: 2021–22, 2023–24, 2024–25
Third Place: 2019–20

- Tunisian Cup

Champions: 2019–20
Runner-up: 2008–09

- Tunisian Super Cup

Champions: 2019–20

- Tunisian Ligue Professionnelle 2

Champions: 1975–76, 1979–80,1997–98, 2010–11
Runner-up: 1960–61, 2016–17

== Colors ==
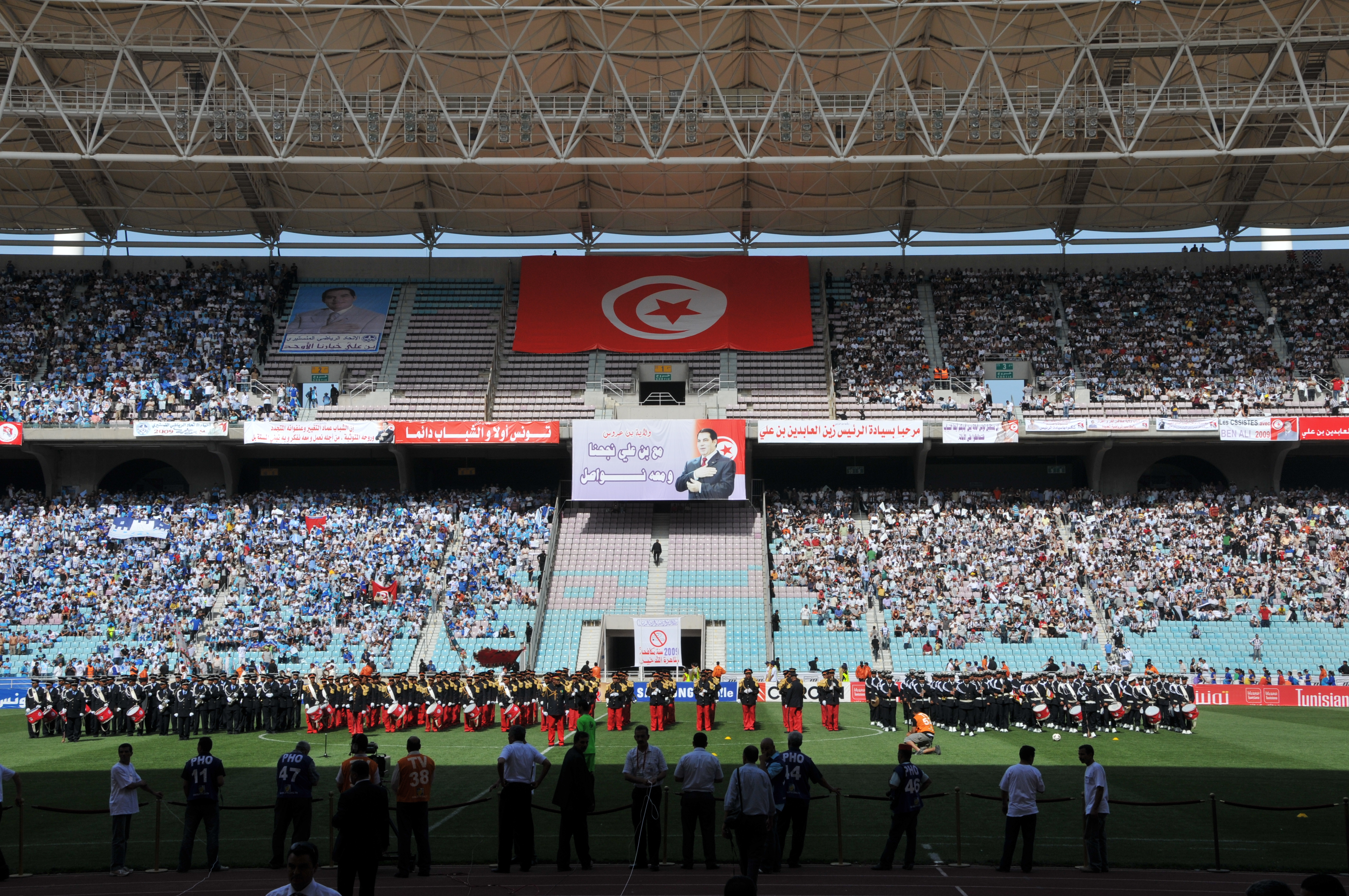
Supporters of USM in 7 November Stadium (on the Left).

The colors of US Monastir are white and blue. At home, the player wears a blue jersey, blue shorts and white socks. Outside of Monastir, the player wears a white jersey, white shorts and blue socks.

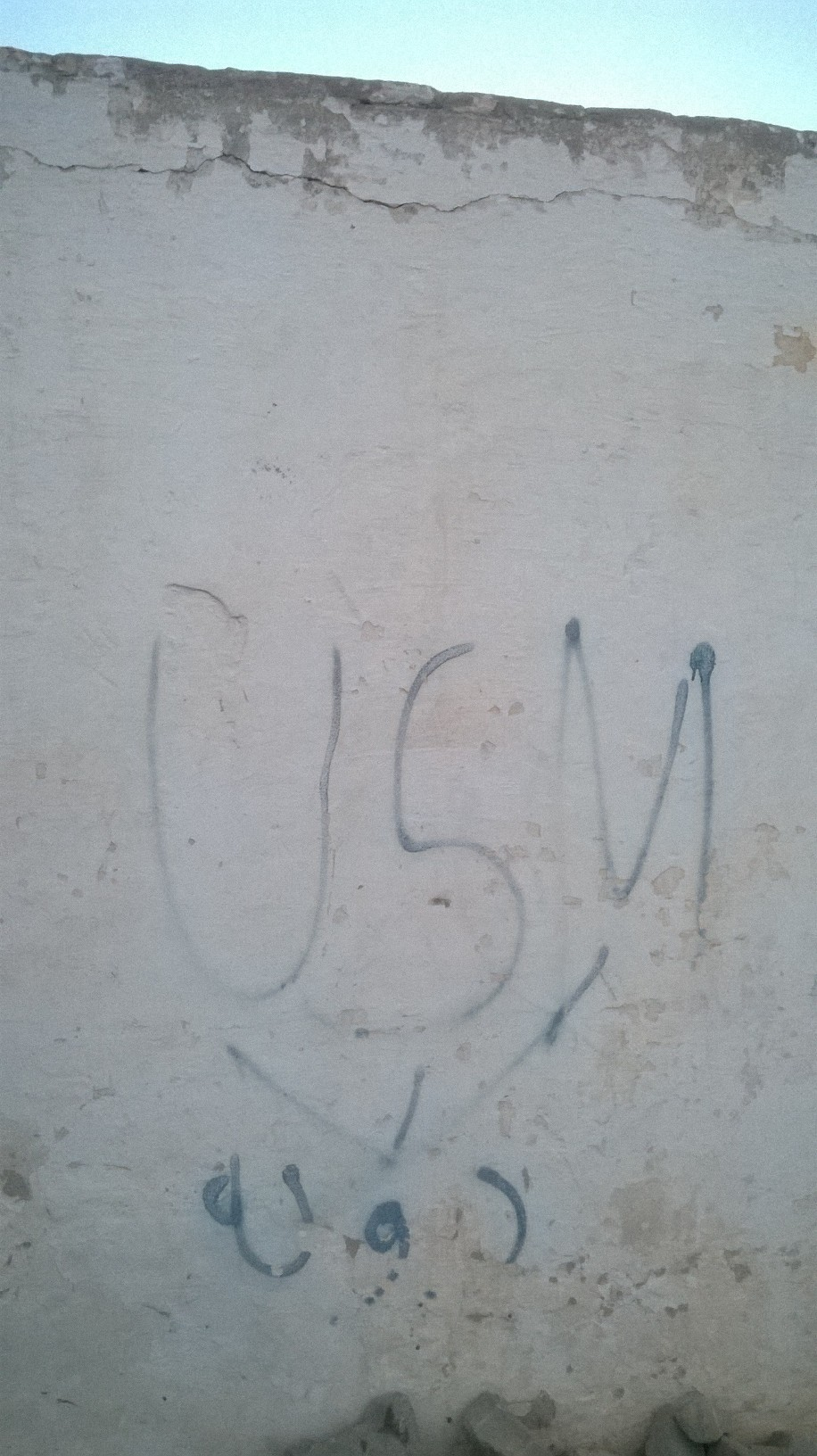
Supporters' expressions on the walls of Monastir.

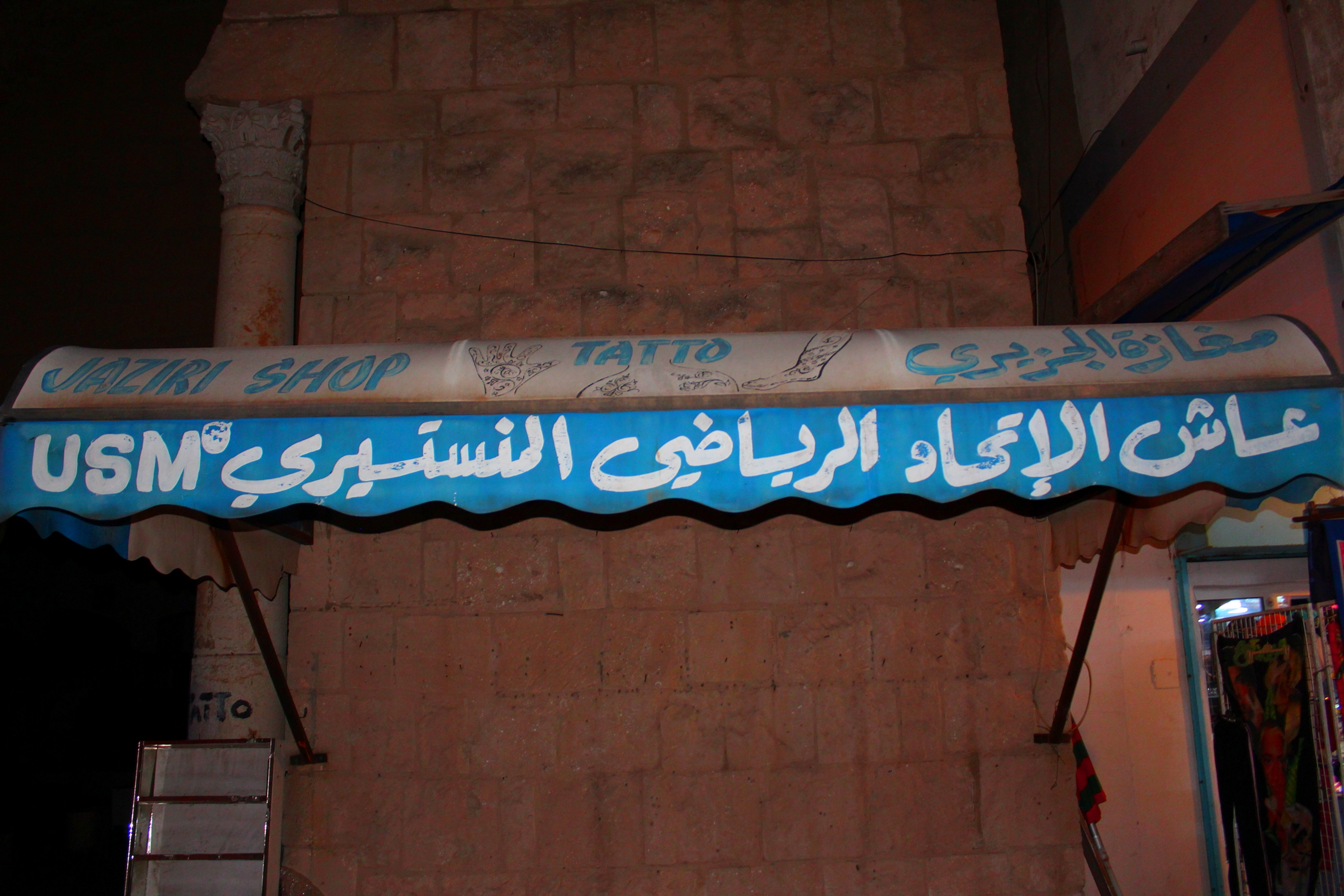
Shop in Monastir honoring the colors of the team.

== Players ==
=== Current squad ===
As of 15 September, 2026

Note: Flags indicate national team as defined under FIFA eligibility rules; some limited exceptions apply. Players may hold more than one non-FIFA nationality.

No.	Pos.	Nation	Player
1	GK	TUN	Rayen Besbes
2	DF	TUN	Mahmoud Ghorbel
3	DF	TUN	Youssef Herch
5	MF	TUN	Miras Ben Hassan
7	MF	GUI	Ousmane Diané
8	MF	TUN	Yassine Amri
9	FW	TUN	Ahmed Bouassida
11	MF	TUN	Adnene Yaakoubi
12	DF	TUN	Abderrahman Bouzganda
13	DF	TUN	Rayane Azzouz
16	DF	TUN	Ayman Ben Mohamed
17	DF	CMR	Aboubakar Youssouf
19	MF	TUN	Anes Kordi
20	MF	TUN	Salah Barhoumi
21	DF	TUN	Raed Bouchniba
23	MF	TUN	Chaïm El Djebali

No.	Pos.	Nation	Player
24	GK	TUN	Ahmed Slimane
26	DF	TUN	Nour Zamen Zammouri
27	MF	TUN	Nassim Douihech
28	FW	ALG	Samy Bouali
29	FW	MLI	Ibrahim Gadiaga
31	MF	TUN	Adem Boulila
32	GK	TUN	Yassine Kallel
33	MF	MAD	Behaja Tsirava
35	FW	TUN	Firas Miladi
36	MF	FRA	Mohamed Boussadia
37	FW	TUN	Béchir Yacoub
43	MF	TUN	Omar Hafsi
47	DF	TUN	Bayram Nouicer
67	MF	TUN	Malek Mehri
71	GK	TUN	Dries Arfaoui
99	DF	TUN	Rayan Boukadida

=== Out on loan ===
Note: Flags indicate national team as defined under FIFA eligibility rules; some limited exceptions apply. Players may hold more than one non-FIFA nationality.

No.	Pos.	Nation	Player
—	MF	CIV	Alpha Sidibé (at Olympique Béja until 30 June 2026)

== Coaching staff ==
Position	Name
Head coach	(Tunisia) Tarek Jarraya
Assistant coach	(Tunisia) Akrem Maatouk
Assistant coach	(Tunisia) Aymen Moussa
Goalkeeping coach	(Tunisia) Safouane Hidri
Fitness coach	(Tunisia) Chamseddine Guinoubi
Fitness coach	(Tunisia) Anas Nabi
Team doctor	(Tunisia) Riadh Hizem

== Managers ==
Nat	Name	Period
(Tunisia)	Hassouna Denguezli	1957–1958
(Tunisia)	Slaïem Belhaj Ali	1958–1959
(Tunisia)	Mokhtar Ben Nacef	1959–1961
(Germany)	Rudi Gutendorf	1961–1962
(Tunisia)	Ahmed Benfoul	1962–1963
(Hungary)	Ferenc Locsey	1963–1967
(Tunisia)	Ameur Hizem	1967–1968
(Tunisia)	Mustapha Jouili	1968–1970
(Socialist Federal Republic of Yugoslavia)	Miodrag Georgeovic	1970–1972
(Tunisia)	Hammadi Henia	1972–1973
(Tunisia)	Khemais Chkir	1973–1974
(Tunisia)	Mustapha Jouili	1974–1975
(Tunisia)	Kamel Benzarti	1975–1976
(Tunisia)	Ameur Hizem	1976–1978
(Tunisia)	Ammar Hedhili	1978–1979
(Tunisia)	Faouzi Benzarti	1979–1982
(Germany)	Dieter Schulte	1982–1983
(Socialist Federal Republic of Yugoslavia)	Radojica Radojičić	1983–1984
(Algeria)	Hamid Zouba	1984–1985
(Tunisia)	Lotfi Benzarti	1985–1987
(Tunisia)	Ameur Dhib	1987–1988
(Germany)	Gerhard Wolfgang	1988–1989
(France) (France)	Dominique Bathenay; Jean-Pierre Brucato	1989–1990
(Germany)	Manfred Höner	1990–1991
(Tunisia)	Faouzi Benzarti	1991–1992

Nat	Name	Period
(Algeria)	Bouzid Cheniti	1992–1993
(Tunisia)	Ameur Hizem	1993–1994
(Tunisia)	Kamel Chebli	1994
(Tunisia)	Salah Guedich	1995–1996
(France)	Jean-Yves Chay	1996–1997
(Tunisia)	Lotfi Benzarti	1997–1999
(Tunisia)	Habib Majeri	1999–2000
(Belgium)	Léon Semmeling	2000
(Algeria)	Ali Fergani	2000–2001
(Tunisia)	Lotfi Benzarti	2001–2004
(Tunisia)	Lotfi Rhim	2004–2005
(Tunisia)	Faouzi Benzarti	2005–2006
(Tunisia)	Samir Jouili	2006–2007
(Germany)	Antoine Hey	2007–2008
(Tunisia)	Lotfi Rhim	2008–2009
(Belgium)	Henri Depireux	2009–2010
(Tunisia)	Jalel Kadri	2010–2011
(Algeria)	Rachid Belhout	2011
(Serbia)	Dragan Cvetković	2011–2012
(Tunisia)	Chiheb Ellili	2012–2013
(Tunisia)	Lotfi Benzarti	2013
(Tunisia)	Mourad Okbi	2013–2015
(Tunisia)	Samir Jouili	2015
(Tunisia)	Lotfi Kadri	2015–2016
(Tunisia)	Lotfi Rhim	2016–2017
(Tunisia)	Skander Kasri	2017–2018

Nat	Name	Period
(Tunisia)	Lassaad Dridi	2018–2019
(Tunisia)	Lassaad Chabbi	2019–2021
(Tunisia)	Afouène Gharbi	2021
(Tunisia)	Mourad Okbi	2021
(Tunisia)	Faouzi Benzarti	2021–2022
(Serbia)	Darko Nović	2022–2023
(Tunisia)	Imed Ben Younes	2023
(Tunisia)	Mohamed Kouki	2023–2024
(Tunisia)	Lassaad Chabbi	2024
(Tunisia)	Mohamed Sahli	2024–2025
(Tunisia)	Faouzi Benzarti	2025
(Tunisia)	Montasser Louhichi	2025–

== Presidents ==
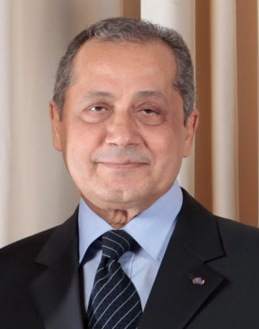
Abdelwahab Abdallah, was one of the team's presidents in the 1980s.

The first president of the club is the French Joseph Kalfati, followed by four other French: Peteche, Georges Rambi, Renaud and Fenech, while the first Tunisian president is Mohamed Salah Sayadi who takes the head of the club in 1929. Another Tunisian president, Salem B'chir, acceded to the presidency in 1953. We owe him for having established a sporting discipline and for putting an end to the laxity of certain players.

N°	Nat	Name	Period	N°	Nat	Name	Period
1	(Tunisia)	Bechir Charnine	1955–1956	16	(Tunisia)	Zouhair Chaouche	1996–1999
2	(Tunisia)	Mohamed Salah Chedly	1956–1962	17	(Tunisia)	Ali Benzarti	1999–2002
3	(Tunisia)	Mahmoud Chaouche	1962–1963	18	(Tunisia)	Zouhair Chaouche	2002–2006
4	(Tunisia)	Allala Laouiti	1963–1980	19	(Tunisia)	Neji Stambouli	2006–2008
5	(Tunisia)	Mohamed El May	1980–1981	20	(Tunisia)	Frej Meddeb	2008–2009
6	(Tunisia)	Abdelwahab Abdallah	1981–1982	21	(Tunisia)	Zouhair Chaouche / Riadh Bhouri	2009–2010
7	(Tunisia)	Hedi Benzarti	1982–1983	22	(Tunisia)	Hedi Benzarti	2010–2011
8	(Tunisia)	Moncef Skhiri	1983–1985	23	(Tunisia)	Ahmed Belli	2011–2014
9	(Tunisia)	Naceur Ktari	1985–1988	24	(Tunisia)	Salem Harzallah / Ali Mzali	2014–2015
10	(Tunisia)	Hedi Benzarti	1988–1990	25	(Tunisia)	Hamed Zenaiti	2015–2016
11	(Tunisia)	Slaheddine Ferchiou	1990–1992	26	(Tunisia)	Ahmed Belli	2016–2023
12	(Tunisia)	Naceur Ktari	1992–1993	27	(Tunisia)	Amir Hizem	2023–2025
13	(Tunisia)	Abdelkader Aguir	1993–1994	28	(Tunisia)	Sabeur Harzallah / Mohamed Slama	2025–
14	(Tunisia)	Mohamed El May / Naceur Skandrani	1994–1995				
15	(Tunisia)	Habib Allegue	1995–1996				

== Home stadium ==
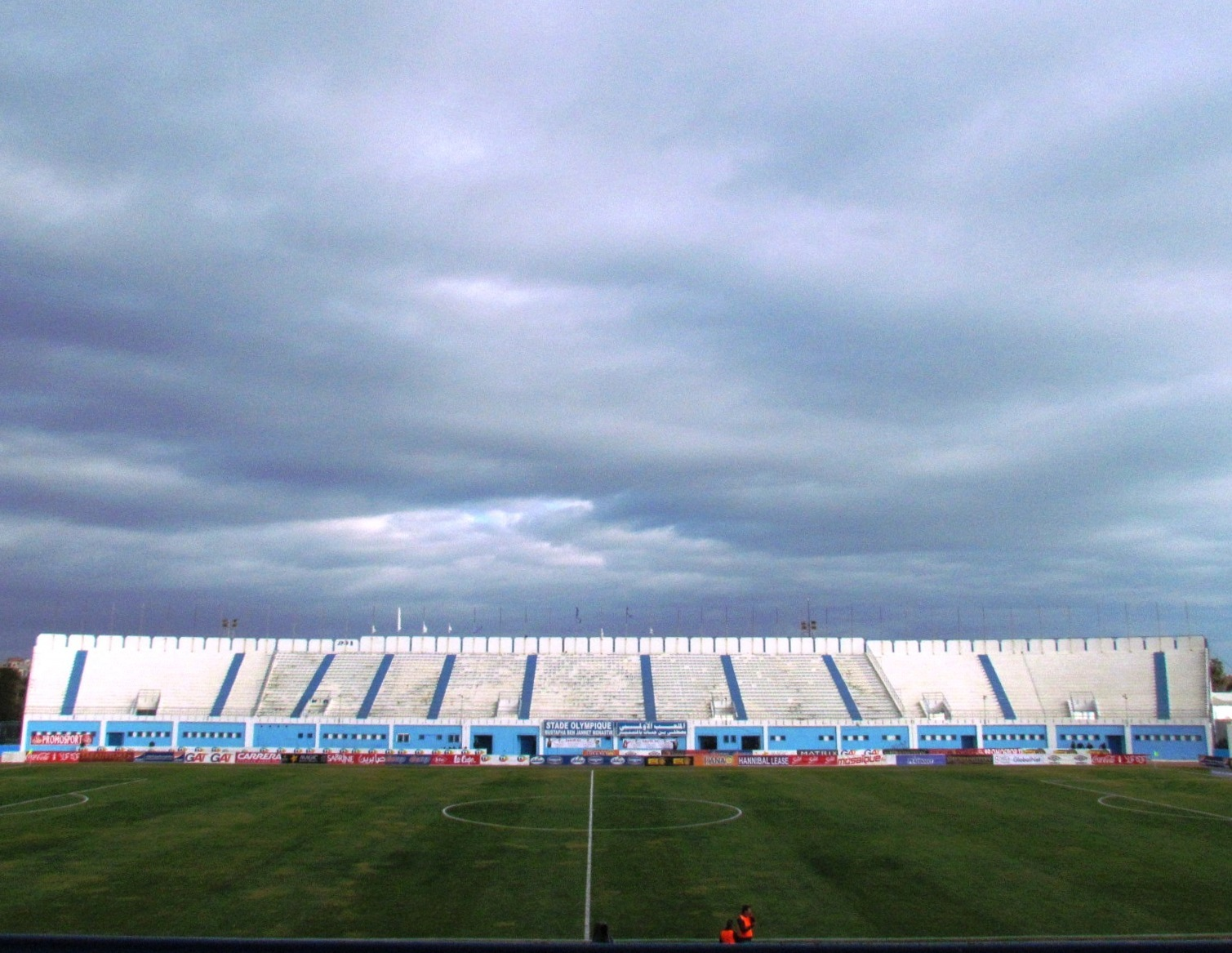
The home stadium of US Monastir

US Monastir's home ground is the Mustapha Ben Jannet Stadium, a multi-purpose stadium located in Monastir, Tunisia. It was one of the venues used during the 2004 African Cup of Nations. The stadium has a seating capacity of 20,000 and occasionally serves as a home venue for the Tunisia national football team.

Inaugurated in 1958, the stadium was originally designed by architect Olivier-Clément Cacoub, utilizing the "cantilevered ball joint" technique to create suspended tiers. Initially, it had a capacity of 3,000 seats. Over the years, several expansions took place, increasing its capacity to over 10,000 by the late 1990s. Ahead of the 2004 African Cup of Nations, further renovations expanded the seating to 20,000.

The stadium is part of a larger sports complex in Monastir, situated just a few hundred meters from the city center.

== Rivalry ==
The most important rivalry known to US Monastir, is the one against Etoile Sahel in the city of Sousse. The match is called the Sahel Derby, in reference to the Tunisian coastal region (Tunisian Sahel) where both teams are located.
