= Hameur Hizem =

Tunisian footballer and manager (1937–2023)

Ameur Hizem
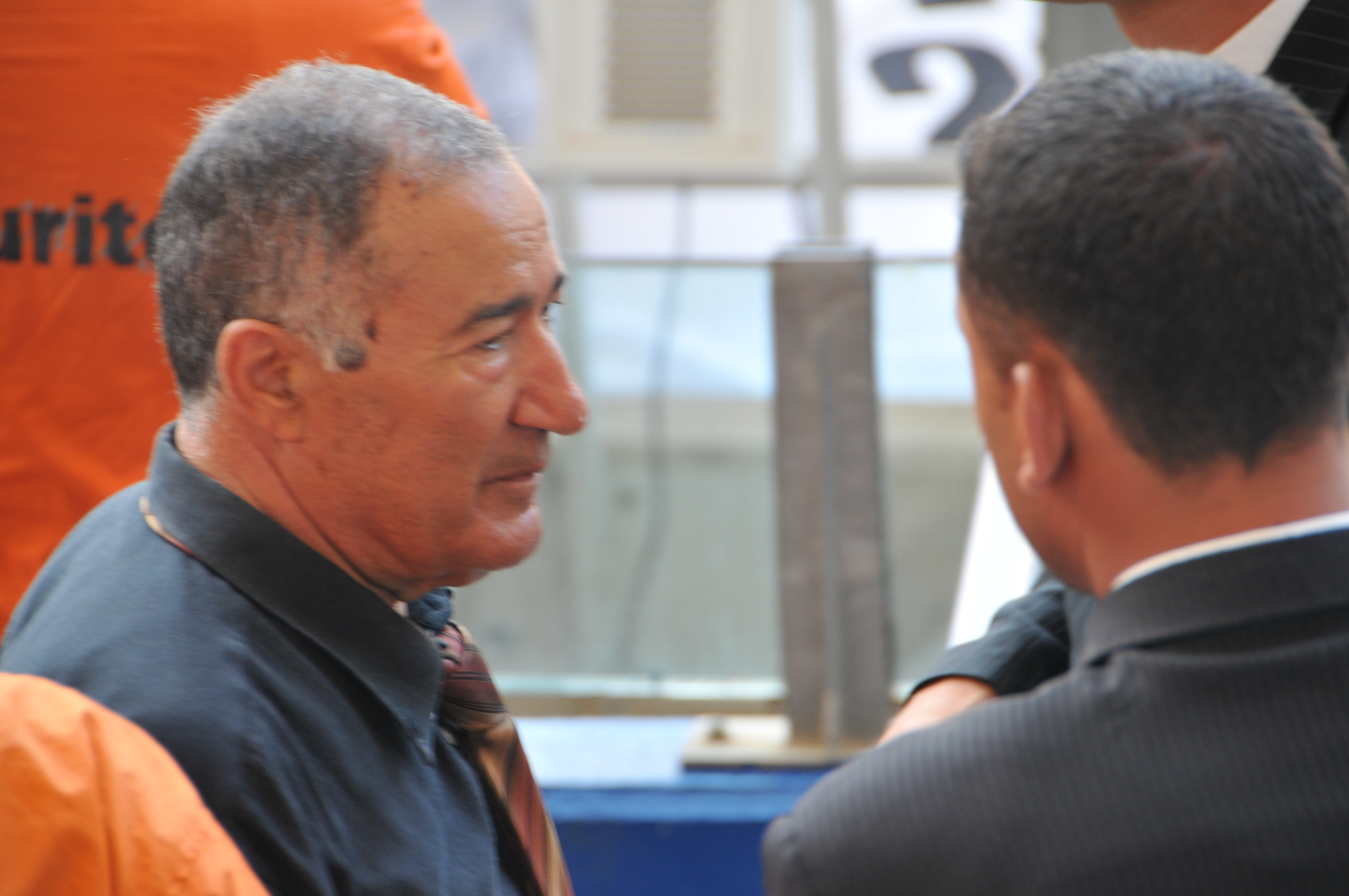
- Hizem in 2009

Personal information
- Date of birth: 22 September 1937
- Place of birth: Monastir, French Tunisia
- Date of death: 4 September 2023 (aged 85)
- Position: Midfielder

Senior career*
Years	Team	Apps	(Gls)
1955–1965	US Monastir		

Managerial career
- 1967–1968: US Monastir
- 1970–1974: Tunisia
- 1974–1975: Club Africain
- 1976–1978: US Monastir
- 1978–1980: Stade Tunisien
- 1978–1979: Tunisia
- 1980–1981: Tunisia
- 1982–1983: Ohod
- 1984: US Monastir
- 1993: US Monastir
- * Club domestic league appearances and goals

Ameur Hizem (Arabic: عامر حيزم; 22 September 1937 – 4 September 2023) was a Tunisian football manager who coached the Tunisia national team. Hizem died on 4 September 2023, at the age of 85.
