= Lotfi Rhim =

Tunisian football manager

Personal information
- Date of birth: 1968 (age 57–58)

Team information
- Current team: Al-Thoqbah Club (manager)

Managerial career
- Years: Team
- 2008–2009: US Monastir
- 2009: Étoile du Sahel
- 2009–2010: US Monastir
- 2010: Al-Hazem FC
- 2011–2012: Al-Muharraq SC
- 2012–2014: Hatta Club
- 2014: Olympic Safi
- 2014–2015: US Monastir
- 2015: Al-Nasr
- 2016–2017: US Monastir
- 2018: US Monastir
- 2021–: Al-Thoqbah Club

Lotfi Rhim (born 1968) is a Tunisian football manager.
