= Anton Bilek =

Austrian footballer and manager

Personal information
- Full name: Anton Bilek
- Date of birth: 20 November 1903
- Place of birth: Austro-Hungary
- Date of death: 28 November 1991 (aged 88)
- Place of death: Austria
- Position: Midfielder

Senior career*
Years	Team	Apps	(Gls)
1922–1923	Floridsdorfer AC	2	(0)
1923–1924	Admira Vienna		
1924–1931	Wiener AC	114	(2)
1931–1933	FC Solothurn		

International career
1927–1928	Austria	2	(0)

Managerial career
- 1931–1933: FC Solothurn
- 1933–1934: FC Montreux-Sports
- 1934–1936: FC Lyon
- 1936–1938: Bata Borovo
- * Club domestic league appearances and goals

Anton Bilek (20 November 1903 – 28 November 1991) was an Austrian football manager and former player.

== Club career ==
During his plating career he played in Austrian top-league clubs Floridsdorfer AC, Admira Vienna and Wiener AC, before ending his career as a player/manager at Swiss side FC Solothurn.His appointments in Switzerland formed part of a broader influx of Central European football coaches into Swiss football following the introduction of professional football there in the early 1930s.

== International career ==
Anton Bilek made 2 appearances for the Austria national football team, one in 1927 and another in 1928.

== Coaching career ==
He started his coaching career while he was still as player at Swiss side FC Solothurn. He then coached French sides FC Montreux-Sports and FC Lyon during mid-1930s, before coaching Yugoslav side SK Bata Borovo between 1936 and 1938.
