= Pavao Rajzner =

Croatian footballer and manager

Personal information
- Date of birth: 19 June 1942
- Place of birth: Vukovar, Independent State of Croatia
- Date of death: 5 March 2015 (aged 72)
- Place of death: Belgrade, Serbia
- Positions: Defender; midfielder

Senior career*
Years	Team	Apps	(Gls)
1957–1961	Borovo		
1961–1973	Bor		

Managerial career
- 1976–1977: FK Bor
- 1988–2000: Rudar Bor
- * Club domestic league appearances and goals

Pavao "Pava" Rajzner (19 June 1942 – 5 March 2015) was a Croatian football player and manager.

== Career ==
Born in Vukovar, now in Croatia but back then in 1942, at time of Second World War, the city was within the Nazi-puppet state of Independent State of Croatia, Rajzner started playing in 1957 at local side NK Borovo in Yugoslav third level. He usually played as either midfielder or defender. In 1961, he moved to Serbian side FK Bor where he will play for the rest of his career until Autumn 1973 when he retired from active playing. He made over 600 games for Bor and was the team captain for 10 seasons. In the FK Bor monography, Rajzner is considered among the greatest players of Bor of all time. He was part of the team that got promotion and played during the seasons between 1968 and 1973 when the club played in Yugoslav First League where he made 364 appearances. His farewell match was played on 19 October 1973, in an exhibition-game against Brazilian side ABC from Rio Grande. After retiring he stayed in the club becoming the manager of FK Bor youth sections. Later, he also became member of the direction board of the club. In 1988, he took charge of FK Rudar Bor where he stayed until 2000.

In 1965, he was condecorated as the sportsman of the year by the Bor municipality and he was on several occasions as the coach of the year or the honorary citizen of Bor. He died in Serbian capital, Belgrade, on 5 March 2015.
