= Fahrudin Zejnilović =

Bosnian footballer and manager

Personal information
- Date of birth: 17 January 1955
- Place of birth: Sarajevo, SFR Yugoslavia
- Date of death: 22 March 2014 (aged 59)
- Place of death: Sarajevo, Bosnia and Herzegovina

Senior career*
Years	Team	Apps	(Gls)
1977–1978	Borac Banja Luka	2	(0)
1979–1980	Maribor	28	(3)
1981	Mercator Ljubljana	13	(0)
1981	Fenerbahçe	2	(0)
1982	Galus Wolfsberg		
1984–1985	Trepča	1	(0)

Managerial career
- 1985–1986: Istra
- 1986–1988: Famos Hrasnica
- 1998–2000: TOŠK Tešanj
- 2000–2001: Đerzelez
- 2002–2003: Igman Konjic
- 2005: Bosnia and Herzegovina U18
- 2007: Saint George
- 2012: Olimpik (caretaker)
- * Club domestic league appearances and goals

Fahrudin Zejnilović (17 January 1955 – 22 March 2014) was a Bosnian professional football manager and former player.

== Playing career ==
Zejnilović played with Borac Banja Luka in the 1977–78 Yugoslav First League before moving to Slovenia and playing with Maribor and Svoboda Ljubljana (known as Merkator back then) in the Yugoslav Second League in the seasons 1979–80 and 1980–81. He played again in the Second League in the 1984–85 season with the Yugoslav club Trepča.

In between Zejnilović played abroad, first at Turkey giant Fenerbahçe in the first half of the 1981–82 season, and in Austria, with Galus Wolfsberg, in the second half of that same season.

== Managerial career ==
Zejnilović started his managerial career back in the mid to late 1980s when he managed Istra and Famos Hrasnica. Later, after the Yugoslav Wars, he took charge of TOŠK Tešanj which he promoted to the First League of Bosnia and Herzegovina in 1999. After TOŠK, Zejnilović managed Đerzelez from 2000 until 2001 and later Igman Konjic.

He was then named by the Bosnia and Herzegovina FA to be head coach of the Bosnia and Herzegovina U18 national team at the 2005 Mediterranean Games. Abroad, Zejnović managed Ethiopian Premier League club Saint George in 2007.

In November 2012, he was the caretaker manager of Bosnian Premier League club Olimpik for one match.

== Later life ==
In December 2013, an unknown person threw from a car a bomb which detonated in front of Zejnilović's house in Sarajevo with no consequences besides material damage. Zejnilović died just four months later on 22 March 2014 in Sarajevo.
