= Milija Brkić =

Serbian footballer

- Brkić as manager of Bor in 2011

Personal information
- Date of birth: 23 October 1954 (age 72)
- Place of birth: Bor, FPR Yugoslavia
- Height: 1.84 m (6 ft 1/2 in)
- Position: Forward

Youth career
- 1971–1977: Bor

Senior career*
Years	Team	Apps	(Gls)
1977–1978	Bor		
1978–1983	Galenika Zemun		
1983–1989	Bor		
1989–1990	Brestovac		
1990–1991	Rudar Bor		

International career
1982	Yugoslavia B	4	(0)

Managerial career
- 1991–1993: Bor (youth)
- 1993–1996: Bor
- 2000–2005: Zemun (youth)
- 2006: Zemun (assistant)
- 2006: Zemun (caretaker)
- 2010–2011: Bor
- 2012: Timok (assistant)
- 2014–2015: Budućnost Arilje
- * Club domestic league appearances and goals

Milija Brkić (Serbian Cyrillic: Милија Бркић; born 23 October 1954) is a Serbian retired professional footballer who played from the early 1970s to early 1990s. After retiring he served as a manager for numerous different clubs.

== Playing career ==
Born in Bor, Serbia, Socialist Federal Republic of Yugoslavia, Brkić started playing with his hometown club Bor, and made his senior debut in 1977.

Brkić played from 1978 to 1982 in Galenika Zemun in the Yugoslav Second League. He also played for six years at Bor in the second-tier football league of Yugoslavia.

== International career ==
Brkić played four matches for Yugoslavia at the Nehru Cup in 1982. The coach of that team was the legendary Miljan Miljanić, a former manager of Real Madrid.

== Managerial career ==
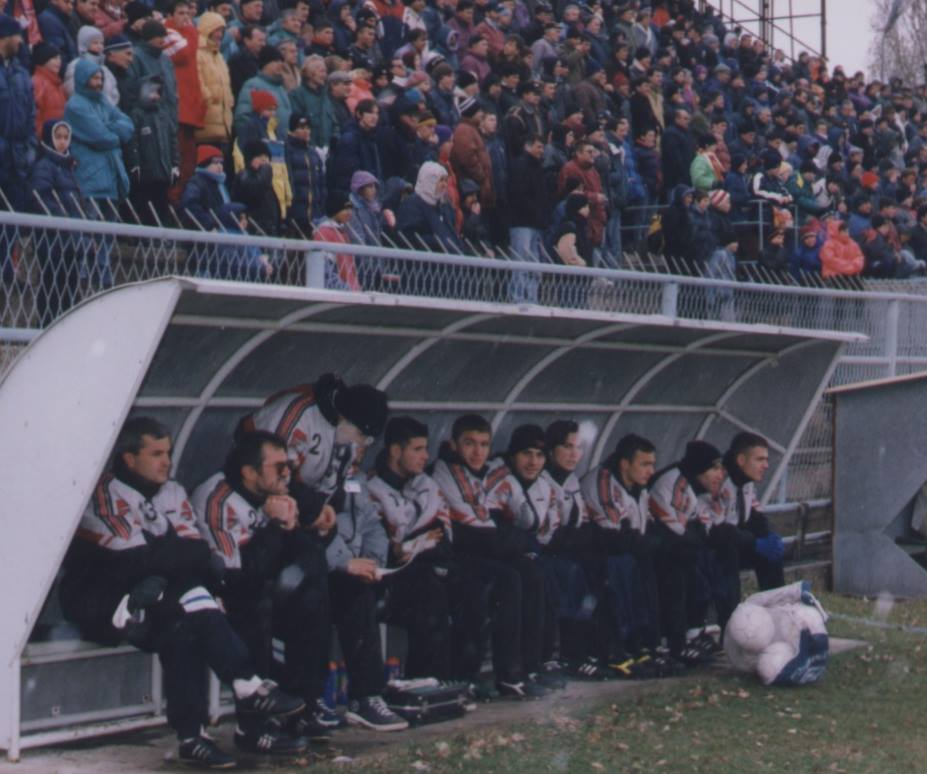
Milija Brkić as manager of Bor in 90's

Brkić began his managerial career in 1991 for his parent club Bor, spending several years as a coach of the first team in the Yugoslav Second League. He was also caretaker coach of Zemun, replacing Dragan Lacmanović in late 2006.

In 2010 Brkić came back to his original club, Bor, trying to help his former club return to the old way of success. Unfortunately, bad finance situations in the club impacted their season, making it very turbulent.

After a few years of break, Brkić decided to accept an offer to manage FK Budućnost Arilje, where he lived, and to help them to achieve placement in the Drina Zone League. They succeeded, without a single recorded loss in season. However, Brkić declined to extend his contract with the club.
