= 1967–68 Yugoslav First League =

Prva savezna liga
- Season: 1967–68
- Dates: 20 August 1967 – 30 June 1968
- Champions: Red Star (8th title)
- Relegated: None
- European Cup: Red Star
- Cup Winners' Cup: Bor
- Inter-Cities Fairs Cup: Dinamo Zagreb; Olimpija; Vojvodina; OFK Belgrade
- Top goalscorer: Slobodan Santrač (22)

The 1967–68 Yugoslav First League season was the 22nd season of the First Federal League (Serbo-Croatian: Prva savezna liga), the top level association football league of SFR Yugoslavia, since its establishment in 1946. Sixteen teams contested the competition, with Red Star winning their eighth national title.

== Teams ==
At the end of the previous season Sutjeska and Čelik were relegated. They were replaced by Proleter Zrenjanin and Maribor.

| Team | Location | Federal Republic | Position in 1966–67 |
|---|---|---|---|
| Dinamo Zagreb | Zagreb | SR Croatia | 2nd |
| Hajduk Split | Split | SR Croatia | 7th |
| Maribor | Maribor | SR Slovenia | — |
| OFK Belgrade | Belgrade | SR Serbia | 13th |
| Olimpija | Ljubljana | SR Slovenia | 14th |
| Partizan | Belgrade | SR Serbia | 3rd |
| Proleter Zrenjanin | Zrenjanin | SR Serbia | — |
| Radnički Niš | Niš | SR Serbia | 9th |
| Red Star | Belgrade | SR Serbia | 5th |
| Rijeka | Rijeka | SR Croatia | 11th |
| Sarajevo | Sarajevo | SR Bosnia and Herzegovina | 1st |
| Vardar | Skopje | SR Macedonia | 8th |
| Velež | Mostar | SR Bosnia and Herzegovina | 10th |
| Vojvodina | Novi Sad | SR Serbia | 4th |
| NK Zagreb | Zagreb | SR Croatia | 12th |
| Željezničar | Sarajevo | SR Bosnia and Herzegovina | 6th |

== League table ==
No team was relegated to Second League at the end of this season in order to increase the number of First League participating teams to 18 beginning with the 1968–69 campaign.

| Pos | Team | Pld | W | D | L | GF | GA | GD | Pts | Qualification |
|---|---|---|---|---|---|---|---|---|---|---|
| 1 | Red Star Belgrade (C) | 30 | 16 | 11 | 3 | 64 | 30 | +34 | 43 | Qualification for European Cup first round |
| 2 | Partizan | 30 | 15 | 8 | 7 | 45 | 31 | +14 | 38 | |
| 3 | Dinamo Zagreb | 30 | 12 | 11 | 7 | 45 | 33 | +12 | 35 | Invitation for Inter-Cities Fairs Cup first round |
| 4 | Hajduk Split | 30 | 12 | 10 | 8 | 44 | 37 | +7 | 34 | |
| 5 | Željezničar | 30 | 12 | 9 | 9 | 44 | 34 | +10 | 33 | |
| 6 | Vardar | 30 | 10 | 10 | 10 | 31 | 37 | −6 | 30 | |
| 7 | Sarajevo | 30 | 13 | 3 | 14 | 46 | 39 | +7 | 29 | |
| 8 | Proleter Zrenjanin | 30 | 10 | 9 | 11 | 35 | 44 | −9 | 29 | |
| 9 | Radnički Niš | 30 | 13 | 2 | 15 | 36 | 48 | −12 | 28 | |
| 10 | NK Zagreb | 30 | 10 | 7 | 13 | 53 | 54 | −1 | 27 | |
| 11 | Olimpija | 30 | 9 | 9 | 12 | 33 | 46 | −13 | 27 | Invitation for Inter-Cities Fairs Cup first round |
| 12 | Maribor | 30 | 8 | 11 | 11 | 38 | 53 | −15 | 27 | |
| 13 | Vojvodina | 30 | 7 | 12 | 11 | 28 | 30 | −2 | 26 | Invitation for Inter-Cities Fairs Cup first round |
| 14 | Velež | 30 | 9 | 8 | 13 | 33 | 40 | −7 | 26 | |
| 15 | OFK Belgrade | 30 | 9 | 7 | 14 | 38 | 46 | −8 | 25 | Invitation for Inter-Cities Fairs Cup first round |
| 16 | Rijeka | 30 | 8 | 7 | 15 | 37 | 48 | −11 | 23 | |

Source: rsssf.org
Rules for classification: 1) points; 2) goal difference; 3) number of goals scored.
(C) Champions

== Results ==
| Home \ Away | DIN | HAJ | MAR | OFK | OLI | PAR | PRO | RNI | RSB | RIJ | SAR | VAR | VEL | VOJ | ZAG | ŽEL |
|---|---|---|---|---|---|---|---|---|---|---|---|---|---|---|---|---|
| Dinamo Zagreb | | 0–0 | 4–1 | 2–0 | 4–1 | 1–1 | 2–0 | 5–2 | 2–0 | 2–1 | 1–0 | 0–0 | 1–1 | 0–0 | 5–2 | 3–2 |
| Hajduk Split | 2–0 | | 1–1 | 1–1 | 1–2 | 0–1 | 3–2 | 4–1 | 1–1 | 4–2 | 1–0 | 1–0 | 4–1 | 1–0 | 1–1 | 1–0 |
| Maribor | 2–0 | 1–1 | | 2–1 | 0–0 | 2–2 | 3–0 | 0–2 | 2–2 | 5–3 | 2–1 | 1–2 | 1–1 | 1–1 | 2–0 | 3–0 |
| OFK Belgrade | 1–0 | 2–0 | 2–0 | | 5–0 | 1–1 | 3–1 | 1–2 | 1–1 | 0–0 | 3–1 | 5–1 | 3–1 | 2–0 | 1–5 | 0–2 |
| Olimpija | 0–0 | 0–0 | 2–2 | 2–0 | | 2–1 | 3–1 | 2–0 | 0–0 | 0–2 | 4–0 | 2–3 | 0–0 | 0–0 | 1–0 | 2–2 |
| Partizan | 2–0 | 2–2 | 4–1 | 2–0 | 3–2 | | 5–2 | 2–0 | 1–0 | 1–1 | 1–0 | 1–0 | 2–1 | 3–2 | 2–0 | 1–1 |
| Proleter Zrenjanin | 2–1 | 2–3 | 0–0 | 0–0 | 2–0 | 1–0 | | 1–0 | 2–0 | 3–0 | 2–1 | 3–0 | 2–0 | 2–0 | 3–3 | 2–1 |
| Radnički Niš | 2–1 | 3–2 | 3–1 | 3–0 | 3–1 | 3–1 | 1–0 | | 0–1 | 0–1 | 1–0 | 0–0 | 1–0 | 1–1 | 3–0 | 2–0 |
| Red Star | 2–2 | 3–2 | 6–1 | 6–0 | 6–1 | 2–2 | 1–1 | 3–2 | | 2–0 | 1–0 | 1–1 | 4–0 | 2–0 | 5–2 | 2–0 |
| Rijeka | 1–1 | 1–0 | 0–1 | 3–1 | 3–1 | 1–2 | 0–0 | 4–0 | 1–3 | | 3–0 | 3–1 | 1–1 | 1–1 | 2–2 | 2–3 |
| Sarajevo | 2–0 | 4–2 | 3–0 | 2–1 | 3–0 | 3–1 | 6–1 | 2–0 | 1–1 | 3–0 | | 2–1 | 2–1 | 0–1 | 5–0 | 1–1 |
| Vardar | 1–1 | 2–0 | 1–1 | 0–0 | 1–1 | 1–0 | 0–0 | 2–0 | 0–2 | 1–0 | 2–1 | | 4–2 | 2–1 | 3–4 | 0–2 |
| Velež | 1–2 | 0–1 | 5–1 | 2–1 | 1–0 | 1–0 | 1–1 | 2–0 | 0–0 | 2–0 | 3–1 | 0–0 | | 2–0 | 2–0 | 1–3 |
| Vojvodina | 1–2 | 2–2 | 1–0 | 0–0 | 2–3 | 0–1 | 3–0 | 3–0 | 2–2 | 2–0 | 0–0 | 0–1 | 0–0 | | 1–0 | 2–0 |
| NK Zagreb | 2–2 | 0–1 | 5–1 | 3–2 | 0–1 | 0–0 | 1–1 | 3–1 | 2–3 | 3–0 | 4–0 | 3–1 | 3–1 | 3–1 | | 2–2 |
| Željezničar | 1–1 | 2–2 | 0–0 | 3–1 | 1–0 | 1–0 | 3–0 | 5–0 | 1–2 | 3–1 | 1–2 | 0–0 | 2–0 | 1–1 | 1–0 | |

Source: DataSoccer.it
Legend: Blue = home team win; Yellow = draw; Red = away team win.

== Top scorers ==
| Rank | Player | Club | Goals |
|---|---|---|---|
| 1 | (Socialist Federal Republic of Yugoslavia) Slobodan Santrač | OFK Belgrade | 22 |
| 2 | (Socialist Federal Republic of Yugoslavia) Vojin Lazarević | Red Star | 21 |
| 3 | (Socialist Federal Republic of Yugoslavia) Stevan Ostojić | Red Star | 15 |
| 4 | (Socialist Federal Republic of Yugoslavia) Petar Nadoveza | Hajduk Split | 14 |
| 5 | (Socialist Federal Republic of Yugoslavia) Edin Sprečo | Željezničar | 13 |
| 6 | (Socialist Federal Republic of Yugoslavia) Dragan Džajić | Red Star | 12 |
| 6 | (Socialist Federal Republic of Yugoslavia) Dušan Bajević | Velež | 12 |
| 6 | (Socialist Federal Republic of Yugoslavia) Josip Gucmirtl | Dinamo Zagreb | 12 |

== See also ==
- 1967–68 Yugoslav Second League
- 1967–68 Yugoslav Cup
