= Jovan Hajduković =

Hungarian-born Montenegrin footballer

Personal information
- Full name: Jovan Hajduković; István Haydukovics
- Date of birth: 8 January 1943
- Place of birth: Budapest, Hungary
- Date of death: 7 November 2013 (aged 66)
- Place of death: SFR Yugoslavia
- Position: Goalkeeper

Youth career
- Red Star Belgrade

Senior career*
Years	Team	Apps	(Gls)
1963–1967	Budućnost Titograd		
1967–1974	Bor		
1974	América Cali		
1975–1977	Bor		
1977–1980	Majdanpek	91	(0)
1980–1981	Radnički Kragujevac	4	(0)

International career
1971–1972	Yugoslavia Olympic	2	(0)
- * Club domestic league appearances and goals

Jovan Hajduković (8 January 1943 – 7 November 2013) was a Hungarian-born Montenegrin former football goalkeeper.

== Club career ==
Born in Budapest, capital of Hungary, in 1943 during Second World War, Hajduković spent most of his career in Yugoslavia, with a spell as well in Colombia. He started playing at Serbian giants Red Star Belgrade, but he debuted as senior with Montenegrin side Budućnost Titograd He played with Budućnost in the Yugoslav Second League between 1963 and 1967, and while there, he was also the goalkeeper of the Montenegro team that played against Soviet Union national team on April 1, 1966, in Titograd, in Soviet Union's preparation matches for the 1966 FIFA World Cup, where they will achieve their greatest result in a World Cup ever, fourth place.

In 1967, he moved to ambitious FK Bor which was playing same league as Budućnost, the Second League, however Bor was building a strong team aiming for higher goals, and that season, with Hajduković as main goalkeeper, FK Bor won the league and achieved promotion to the Yugoslav First League. Hajduković stayed with Bor until 1977, almost a decade, because in between he had a spell abroad, in Colombia, with América de Cali in 1975. Hajduković entered the strict group of greatest players of FK Bor of all time, as recorded by the club monograph "Od Zone do Zone". In January 1974, América de Cali was already trying to bring Hajduković to their squad, but Bor refused to release him Bor will allow the move in following summer and by January 1975 he was already back in the squad. However, by then FK Bor had been relegated from the first league and Hajduković was allowed to return to Colombia. Since then, he played in the Yugoslav Second League until the end of his career, first between 1977 and 1980 with RFK Majdanpek and then in the season 1980–81 with FK Radnički Kragujevac.

He died in October 2013.

== International career ==
Hajduković also played two games for the Yugoslavia Olympic football team in 1971 and 1972.
