= Nikola Perlić =

Yugoslavian footballer (1912–1986)

Personal information
- Date of birth: 4 February 1912
- Place of birth: Slavonski Brod, Austro-Hungary
- Date of death: 19 January 1986 (aged 73)
- Place of death: Borovo, SR Croatia, SFR Yugoslavia
- Position: Midfielder

Youth career
- Proleter Slavonski Brod

Senior career*
Years	Team	Apps	(Gls)
1929–1933	Marsonia		
1933–1937	SK Jugoslavija		
1937–1938	SC Fives		
1938–1940	SK Jugoslavija		
1940–1941	Bata Borovo		
1945–1953	Slaven Borovo		

International career
1936–1939	Yugoslavia	8	(3)
- * Club domestic league appearances and goals

Nikola Perlić (4 February 1912 – 19 January 1986) was a Yugoslavian footballer who played in top league clubs in Yugoslavia and France, and played for the Yugoslavia national team.

== Club career ==
Born in Slavonski Brod, Austro-Hungary (nowadays Croatia), Perlić was not tall but strong and reliable, playing either as an attacking midfielder or a winger, remembered by strong and effective shots from mid-distance. His playing style was characterised as simple and rational, pressing always the ball and fighting all over the field. He is among the players with longest playing careers at that period: 25 years.

Perlić started playing in the youth team of local club ŠK Proleter. He moved to a major local club, NK Marsonia, where he became senior and played between 1927 and 1933. In 1933 he moved to the national capital, Belgrade, and signed with one of the major Yugoslav clubs, SK Jugoslavija. His good exhibitions will make him with Jugoslavija will earn him 3 calls for the Belgrade representative team (it was usual at that time major cities to have their own selections), and later in 1936 his first call to the national team.

In 1937 Perlić moved to France and played one season with SC Fives in the Ligue 1. The following year he returned to SK Jugoslavija and played further two seasons in the Yugoslav National Championship. In August 1940 he moved to ŠK Bata Borovo and played with them in the 1940–41 Serbian League. However at the end of the season the Second World War started and the Yugoslav football was reorganised. During the war, Nikola Perlić would be twice imprisoned for his resistance activities. He would appear again in the football fields after the war ended, wearing again the colors of Borovo, now renamed into Slaven Borovo. He will stay in Borovo until 1953 finishing his career at the impressive age of 41.

== International career ==
His debut for the Yugoslavia national team was on 6 September 1936, in a 9:3 win in a friendly match against Poland in Belgrade. His fairway match was on 12 November 1939, in a 0:2 loss against Hungary in Belgrade. In between Perlić made a total of 8 appearances and scored 3 goals. His highlight at the national team occurred on 18 May 1939, when he scored the winning goal against England in a 2:1 victory in Belgrade.

== Personal life ==
After retiring Perlić became a tailor. He died on 19 January 1986, in Borovo (SR Croatia, SFR Yugoslavia).
