= FK Famos Hrasnica =

Association football club in Bosnia and Herzegovina

FK Famos
- Full name: FK Famos Hrasnica
- Nickname: Motoristi (The Motorists)
- Founded: 1953; 73 years ago
- Ground: Hrasnica Stadium
- Capacity: 2,000
- Chairman: Mujo Tutun
- Manager: Ermin Poturak
- League: Second League of FBiH (Center)
- 2024–25: Second League of FBiH (Center), 9th of 16
| Home colours | Away colours |

Fudbalski klub Famos Hrasnica (Serbo-Croatian Cyrillic: Фудбалски клуб Фамос Храсница; English: Football Club Famos Hrasnica) is a professional association football club based in the town of Hrasnica, Bosnia and Herzegovina.

The club currently plays in the Second League of the Federation of Bosnia and Herzegovina (Group Center) and plays its home matches on the Hrasnica Stadium, which has a capacity of 2,000 seats. Their neighbours from the community of Vojkovići are called Famos Vojkovići.

== History ==
The club played in the Yugoslav Second League for many years and almost reached the first league, but lost to Croatian club Zagreb in the qualifications in the 1972–73 season. Famos also got all the way to the semi-finals of the 1975–76 Yugoslav Cup, getting eliminated by Hajduk Split 2–0 on aggregate.

After the collapse of Yugoslavia, they played primarily in the third tier of Bosnia and Herzegovina's league system. Famos got relegated from the second tier First League of FBiH, in the 2002–03 season. In the 2011–12 season, SAŠK Napredak, which had competed in the First league of the FBiH in the previous year, faced a crisis and sold their position and club to Famos who had played in the Second League of FBiH. As SAŠK couldn't just sell their position, the two clubs merged under the name Famos-SAŠK Napredak and continued to compete in First League of the FBiH in that season. In the next year, the club would again be named Famos.

== Honours ==
=== Domestic ===
==== League ====
- Second League of the Federation of Bosnia and Herzegovina:
  - Winners (1): 2023–24 (center)
- Yugoslav Second League:
  - Runners-up (1): 1972–73 (south)
- Bosnia and Herzegovina Republic League:
  - Winners (1): 1984–85

==== Cups ====
- Yugoslav Cup:
  - Semi-finalists (1): 1975–76

== Club seasons ==
| Season | League | | | | | | | | | Cup | Europe |
| Season | Division | P | W | D | L | F | A | Pts | Pos | Cup | Europe |
|---|---|---|---|---|---|---|---|---|---|---|---|
| 1997–98 | Second League of Bosnia and Herzegovina - South | 22 | 6 | 8 | 8 | 30 | 38 | 26 | 11th | | |
| 1998–99 | Second League of FBiH – South | 8 | 5 | 1 | 1 | 8 | 2 | 16 | 4th | | |
Current format of Premier League of Bosnia and Herzegovina
| 2000–01 | First League of FBiH | 32 | 12 | 8 | 12 | 46 | 40 | 44 | 9th ↓ | | |
| 2001–02 | Second League of FBiH – South | | | | | | | | ↑ | | |
| 2002–03 | First League of FBiH | 36 | 11 | 6 | 19 | 45 | 62 | 39 | 18th ↓ | | |
| 2003–04 | Second League of FBiH – South | 30 | 19 | 6 | 5 | 63 | 30 | 63 | 2nd | | |
| 2011–12 | First League of FBiH | 30 | 10 | 7 | 13 | 34 | 38 | 37 | 18th ↓ | | |
| 2016–17 | Second League of FBiH – Center | 26 | 16 | 5 | 5 | 59 | 33 | 53 | 2nd | | |
| 2017–18 | Second League of FBiH – Center | 28 | 11 | 6 | 11 | 50 | 51 | 39 | 7st | | |
| 2018–19 | Second League of FBiH – Center | 28 | 8 | 4 | 16 | 42 | 73 | 28 | 13th | | |
| 2019–20 | Second League of FBiH – Center | 15 | 9 | 1 | 5 | 24 | 24 | 28 | 4th | | |
| 2020–21 | Second League of FBiH – Center | 30 | 16 | 8 | 6 | 62 | 40 | 56 | 3rd | | |
| 2021–22 | Second League of FBiH – Center | 30 | 13 | 3 | 14 | 45 | 44 | 42 | 8th | | |
| 2022–23 | Second League of FBiH – Center | 30 | 19 | 4 | 7 | 64 | 25 | 61 | 3rd | 1/16 | |
| 2023–24 | Second League of FBiH – Center | 30 | 22 | 5 | 3 | 79 | 22 | 71 | 1st | | |
| 2024–25 | Second League of FBiH – Center | 30 | 12 | 4 | 14 | 39 | 42 | 40 | 9th | 1/16 | |

== Managerial history ==
- (Socialist Federal Republic of Yugoslavia) Marcel Žigante (1962–1964)
- (Socialist Federal Republic of Yugoslavia) Fahrudin Zejnilović (1986–1988)
- (Bosnia and Herzegovina) Ratko Ninković (2000–2002)
- (Bosnia and Herzegovina) Dženan Hošić (9 May 2014 – 30 June 2017)
- (Bosnia and Herzegovina) Emir Alihodžić (13 April 2021 – 24 August 2021)
- (Bosnia and Herzegovina) Sedin Torlak (24 August 2021 – 5 April 2022)
- (Bosnia and Herzegovina) Aldin Đidić (7 July 2022 – 31 December 2023)
- (Bosnia and Herzegovina) Almir Memić (19 January 2024 – 4 November 2024)
- (Bosnia and Herzegovina) Senad Sarajkić (13 November 2024 – 15 September 2025)
- (Bosnia and Herzegovina) Ermin Poturak (18 September 2025 – present)
