= Radojica Radojičić =

Serbian/Yugoslav football manager

Personal information
- Date of birth: 23 November 1931
- Place of birth: Moštanica, Yugoslavia
- Date of death: 6 May 2021 (aged 89)
- Place of death: Belgrade, Serbia

Managerial career
- Years: Team
- 1964–1965: Rudar Pljevlja
- 1966–1968: Bor
- 1968–1970: Tunisia
- 1974–1975: CS Sfaxien
- 1977–1978: Bor
- 1978–1979: CS Sfaxien
- 1979–1980: CA Bizertin
- 1981–1982: CA Bizertin
- 1987–1988: Océano Club de Kerkennah
- 1989: CS Sfaxien

Radojica "Rado" Radojičić (23 November 1931 – 6 May 2021) was a Serbian/Yugoslav football manager.

He coached Rudar Pljevlja, FK Bor, the Tunisia national football team, CS Sfaxien, CA Bizertin and Océano Club de Kerkennah.
