= FK Bor 1919 =

Association football club in Serbia

Coordinates: 44.071276°N 22.101381°E

Bor
- Full name: Fudbalski klub Bor 1919
- Nickname: Real sa Pirita
- Founded: 1919; 107 years ago
- Ground: Kraljevica Stadium, Zaječar (temporarily)
- Capacity: 8,168
- President: Dejan Stanković
- Head coach: Zoran Vasiljević
- League: Serbian First League
- 2025–26: Serbian League East, 1st of 16 (promoted)
- Website: fkbor1919.rs
Home colours	Away colours

FK Bor 1919 (Serbian Cyrillic: ФК Бор 1919) is a football club based in Bor, Serbia. They play in the 2nd-tier Serbian First League as of the 2026–27 season.

The club was formerly known as RFK Bor (until 1974), FK Bor, OFK Bor, and finally FK Bor 1919 (from 2018). They participated in the 1968–69 European Cup Winners' Cup.

== History ==
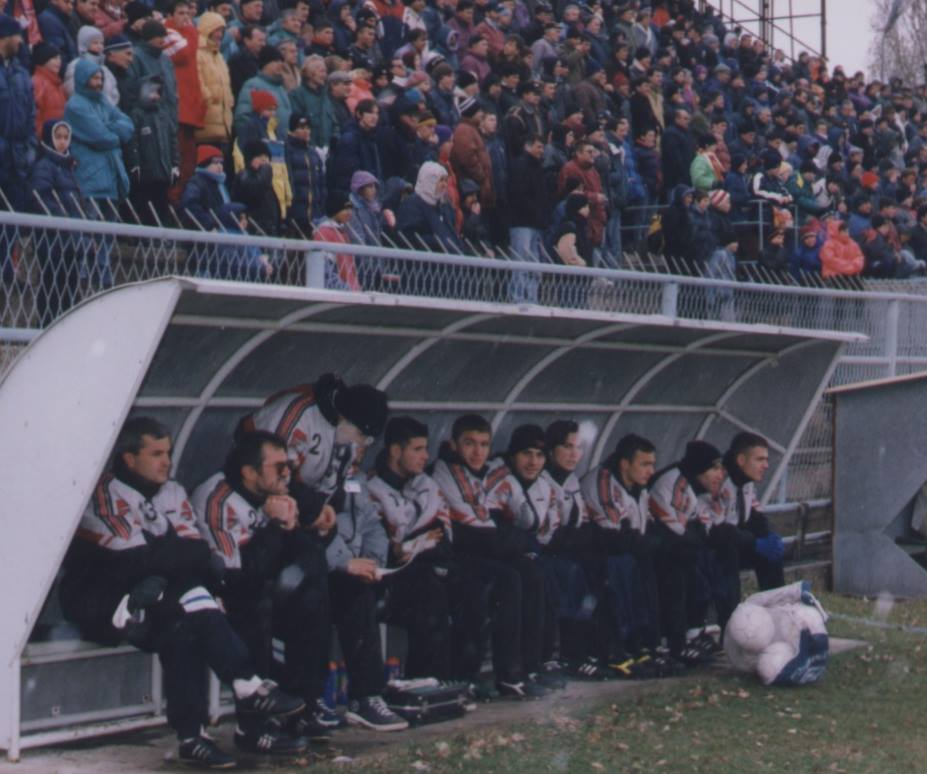
Bor manager Milija Brkić during a Yugoslav Second League match (1990s)

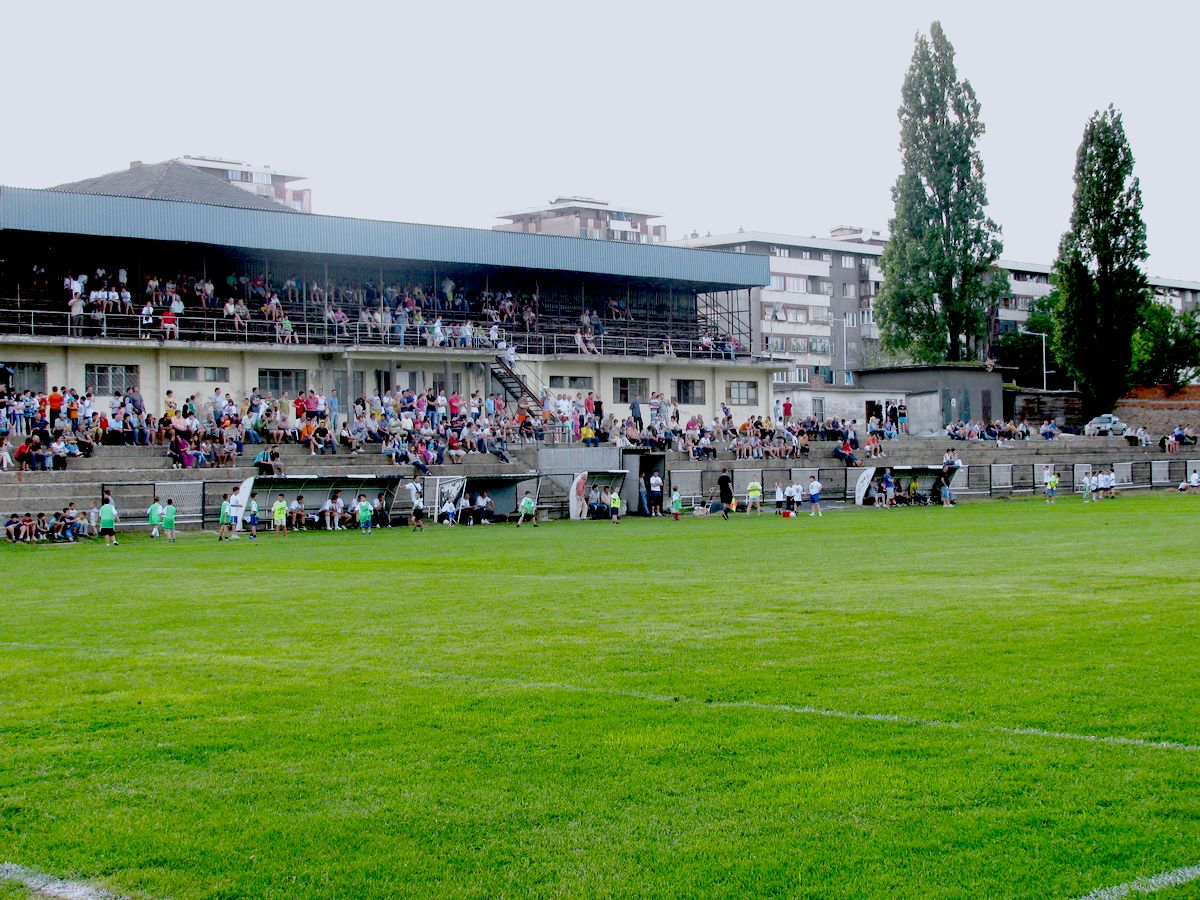
FK Bor stadium

=== Early Years (1920s to 1960s) ===
The club was founded in 1919 as a Serbian-French sports society under the name Association Sportive Bor (ASB). The club was financed by the French Society of the Bor Mines and managed by a Frenchman named Loren, the director of mechanical services in Bor mining company. Not much is recorded about the early club activity, until the first official game played in 1920. ASB's first head coach was Gallois, who also played for the club as well as for France national football team. ASB played only friendlies until early 1930s when it joined the Niš Football Subassociation where it played in the Timok Valley regional league with moderate success until the beginning of the Second World War.

At the beginning of the Second World War, the club was renamed BSK. This was the most successful club in the area of the Eastern Serbia and achieved good results in the Serbian football competitions during the war.

BSK and another local team Rudar merged in early 1945, to form a club with the name of Radnički. Next year, the club officially changed its name to FK Bor and was engaged in the first organized post-war competitions. Soon the prefix rudarski (meaning the miners) was added to the name and the club was known as RFK Bor until 1974, when it changed back to FK Bor.

=== Rise to Prominence (1960s and 1970s) ===
Victories over Radnički Niš by 7–0 and Radnički Kragujevac by 9–1 are good examples of some great exhibitions made in the '50s. Bor played in the Eastern Serbia regional leagues until 1963, when it qualified for the Yugoslav Second League by defeating FK Sloboda Užice in a 3-game playoff. In 1963–64, their first season in the national level, they finished 2nd behind FK Sutjeska Nikšić. FK Bor stayed in the Second League for five consecutive seasons.

The season 1967–68 was by far the best one in the club's history. Coached by Radojica Radojičić, Bor not only won the East Division of the 1967–68 Yugoslav Second League, therefore getting promotion to the top division, the Yugoslav First League, but it also reached the final of the 1967–68 Yugoslav Cup and qualified for the 1968–69 European Cup Winners' Cup. Goalkeeper Jovan Hajduković was voted the best player of the East Division of the Second League.

In the domestic cup campaign Bor achieved two major upsets. In the round of 16, they eliminated the top side FK Radnički Niš in an away match by 2–3, with two goals in the extra time. After eliminating FK Sloboda Tuzla in the quarter-finals, Bor was drawn with another top Yugoslav club, FK Vojvodina. Vojvodina, who were crowned Yugoslav Champions just one year ago, was a clear favorite to win the game. However, backed by some 10,000 home supporters, Bor pulled off a 2–1 victory and qualified for a final with Yugoslav and European powerhouse Red Star Belgrade.

The final was played on 22 May 1968 in Belgrade. Although Red Star won easily with 7–0 securing the Double, Bor earned the right to represent Yugoslavia in the next year's Cup Winners' Cup.

Originally, Bor was drawn against Union Berlin but after the East German clubs withdrew from the competition, they were drawn against the Czechoslovak side Slovan Bratislava. Slovan won 3–2 on aggregate and eventually won the 1968–69 European Cup Winners' Cup trophy.

Bor finished its first season in the top level at 13th place among 18 clubs. They were selected to represent Yugoslavia in the 1969 Balkans Cup – a minor international club competition for Balkan nations. They were eliminated in the group stage with Dinamo Tirana from Albania and Universitatea Craiova from Romania.

After three seasons in the top division they were relegated in 1971, but immediately bounced back, finishing the 1971–72 Second League in front of Priština and eliminating Rudar Ljubija and FK Crvenka in the playoffs. Bor played three more seasons in the Yugoslav First League until 1975. They reached the quarter-finals of the 1970–71 Yugoslav Cup where they were again defeated by the eventual winner Red Star Belgrade.

Bor played two more seasons in the Second League. After 14 consecutive years of playing in the national levels, they got relegated back to the Serbian Republic league (3rd level) in 1977. They were promoted back to the Second League after two seasons and in 1979–80 Yugoslav Second League nearly missed out on the promotion back to the top national league. Before the last matchday up to 5 teams, including Bor, were contesting the first place. Eventually, after allegations of match fixing and an investigation by Yugoslav Football Association, OFK Beograd, Radnički Kragujevac and FK Bor all finished with 37 points, however, OFK Beograd was promoted due to the best goal-difference.

=== 1980s and 1990s ===
The club played in the Second Yugoslav League with moderate success during the first half of the 80s. In 1986 they got relegated to the Serbian Republic League and, in the late 80s, a new third-level competition was formed - the Inter-Republic Leagues. Bor played alongside some solid teams from Serbia proper, Kosovo and Macedonia. In 1990 Bor won this league and promoted to the 1990–91 Yugoslav Second League. In 1992, SFR Yugoslavia collapsed, and Bor continued to play in the 1992–93 Second League of FR Yugoslavia with teams from Serbia and Montenegro but soon got relegated to the Serbian League East.

The club was always relying on RTB Bor for financing and the decline of copper production in the '90s due to the country's economic isolation took its toll on FK Bor as well. Bor saw its last period of playing in the national football level in the late 90s, playing in the Second League of Serbia and Montenegro between 1996 and 2001.

=== Financial struggles in recent years and lower league football (2000s and 2010s) ===
Over the last two decades, Bor has been struggling between Serbian League East and the Serbian Zone League (3rd and 4th competition level) even spending a season in the Bor District League (5th level). In 2012, while playing in the 4th league, the club changed its name to OFK Bor. In 2017, after relegation from the Zone League, club folded due to financial difficulties. The next year, they reorganised under the name FK Bor 1919.

== FK Bor Stadium ==
FK Bor Stadium, commonly known as Stadion kraj Pirita, is a multi-purpose stadium in Bor, Serbia. FK Bor Stadium was built in 1956. First match is played in April 1957, between local rivals FK Bor and Metalac. In that period stadium was one of the most modern stadiums in former Yugoslavia.

=== Bor New Stadium ===
The project of the new football stadium in Bor, which is soon planned to be built on the site of the existing stadium of the Football Club Bor, was presented. The Bor stadium project brings numerous innovations in this area and will be built in accordance with the highest standards. Behind the project stands the renowned house DBA Architects, known for projects that have won awards and recognitions throughout Europe. As for the stadium itself, it will have a capacity of 4550 spectators, with the most modern lighting - UEFA Lighting guide, stitch hybrid surface with automatic watering and field heating system.

What is particularly impressive is the four-star hotel envisioned next to the north stand of the stadium. It will have a capacity of 35 rooms, half of which will have a view of the field as a special curiosity and attraction. It is a specialized hotel that will be able to accommodate teams and staff during competition days, but also to operate in the market and receive guests throughout the year. The main restaurant on the west stand will also be open when there are no matches. Another attractive novelty comes from the side of the south stand. The construction of a handball court on the roof of the parking garage is planned there, while there will be a basketball court at the level of the court that will be able to be used as a TV compound during games if there is a need for it. The project envisages the first stadium in Serbia based on sustainable principles and green energy. The stadium is energy self-sustainable by using heat pumps, solar panels, and a rainwater reuse system for watering the field. There are green roofs with an arrangement of openings and the use of quality materials. The construction of the stadium is planned to start in 2026 and to be completely completed within two years. The stadium will be able to follow the ambitions of the Bor club both for the appearance in the Super League and on the European stage. Bor will also position itself to host numerous domestic and international matches and competitions.

== Recent league history ==
Season	Division	P	W	D	L	F	A	Pts	Pos
2020–21	4 - Zone League East	30	22	5	3	64	14	71	2nd
2021–22	4 - Zone League East	30	16	4	10	56	38	52	4th
2022–23	4 - Zone League East	28	20	4	4	71	20	64	3rd
2023–24	4 - Zone League East	28	18	3	7	67	30	54	2nd
2024–25	4 - Zone League East	27	23	2	2	75	20	71	1st
2025–26	3 - Serbian League East	30	24	3	3	109	32	77	1st

== Records and highlights ==
RFK Bor played in the 1967–68 Yugoslav Cup final: Red Star Belgrade – Bor 7–0 (1–0)

- Highest League Position: 13 in First League
- Lowest League Position: 1st in Bor District League
- Highest Attendance: 20,000 in UEFA Cup Winners' Cup R1 vs Slovan Bratislava
- Biggest Win: 21–0 against BSK Bogovina in Spring 1960
- Biggest Defeat: 13–0 against FK Tabane on 13 April 2016

== Honours ==
- Yugoslav Second League
  - Winners: 1967–68, 1971–72
- Yugoslav Cup
  - Runners-up: 1967–68
- Serbian League
  - Winners: 1962–63, 1979–80, 1989–90, 1995–96
- Niš Zone League
  - Winners: 1960–61, 1961–62
- Bor and Zaječar District Cup
  - Winners: 1935–36, 1936–37, 1938–39, 1995–96, 1996–97
- Niš Football Association Cup
  - Winners: 1953–54
- RTB Trophy
  - Winners: 1957
- Punjab International Football Cup
  - Winners: 2012

== European record ==
Season	Competition	Round	Opponent	Score	Aggregate
1968–69	European Cup Winners' Cup	First round	(Czechoslovakia) Slovan Bratislava	2–0 (H), 0–3 (A)	2–3

== Players ==
=== Current squad ===
As of 21 September 2026

Note: Flags indicate national team as defined under FIFA eligibility rules; some limited exceptions apply. Players may hold more than one non-FIFA nationality.

No.	Pos.	Nation	Player
1	GK	SRB	Branko Nikolić (on loan from Vojvodina)
3	DF	SRB	Jovan Pejčić
4	DF	BIH	Hamza Redžić (on loan from Vojvodina)
5	DF	BIH	Savo Šušić
6	MF	SRB	Đorđe Belić
7	DF	FRA	Alexandre Klopp
8	MF	SUI	Dražen Zdravković
9	FW	UKR	Evgeniy Pavlov
10	MF	GHA	Yahaya Abdul Samed
11	DF	SRB	Dragan Ignić
12	GK	SRB	Jovan Miladinović (dual registration with Železničar Pančevo)
14	FW	SRB	Stefan Denić
15	MF	SRB	Đorđe Marinković (on loan from Mladost Lučani)
16	MF	SRB	Predrag Medić
19	FW	SRB	Strahinja Stojanović

No.	Pos.	Nation	Player
21	DF	BIH	Dražen Dubačkić (on loan from Mladost Lučani)
22	DF	SRB	Milan Srbijanac
23	DF	SRB	Bratislav Đukić
24	DF	SRB	Filip Antonijević
26	GK	SRB	Strahinja Marković
30	MF	SRB	Nikola Marinković
33	DF	SRB	Boris Varga
40	FW	SRB	Lazar Peranović (on loan from Vojvodina)
49	MF	NGR	Clement Ikenna
55	FW	SRB	Damjan Đokanović (on loan from Vojvodina)
77	DF	SRB	Ilija Matejević
81	MF	SRB	Filip Jorgovanović
88	MF	SRB	Dejan Milićević (captain)
91	MF	SRB	Mihailo Madžarević

=== Out on loan ===
Note: Flags indicate national team as defined under FIFA eligibility rules; some limited exceptions apply. Players may hold more than one non-FIFA nationality.

No.	Pos.	Nation	Player
—	GK	SRB	Sava Prodanović (at Brodarac until the end of the 2026–27 season)
—	MF	SRB	Igor Bubanja (at Trayal until the end of the 2026–27 season)

No.	Pos.	Nation	Player
—	MF	SRB	Rastko Nikolić (at Timočanin until the end of the 2026–27 season)
—	MF	SRB	Jasin Nuredini (at Timok until the end of the 2026–27 season)

== Technical staff ==
As of 11 October 2026

Current technical staff
- Head coach: (Serbia) Zoran Vasiljević
- Assistant coach: (Serbia) Vladan Žujović
- Goalkeeping coach: (Serbia) Vojislav Vukić
- Analyst: (Serbia) Aleksandar Kirovski
- Fitness coach: (Serbia) Dušan Stević
- Doctor: (Serbia) Saša Makulović
- Physiotherapist: (Serbia) Filip Mančić
- Physiotherapist: (Serbia) Saša Stojčić
- Club representative: (Serbia) Dejan Mašić

== Board and management ==
As of 11 August 2026

Current management
- President: (Serbia) Dejan Stanković
- Sports sector coordinator: (Serbia) Ljubiša Dunđerski

== FK Bor Supporters Player of the Year ==
- 2009–10: (Serbia) Marko Terzić

== Historical list of coaches ==
- (Serbia) Zoran Vasiljević (2 October 2026 – )
- (Serbia) Miljan Đurović (June 2026 – October 2026 )
- (Serbia) Mladen Dodić (May 2026 – June 2026)
- (Serbia) Stefan Ranđelović (12 Sep 2025 – May 2026)
- (Serbia) Alen Tupajić (Jul 2025 – Sep 25)
- (Serbia) Žarko Jovanović (8 Feb 2025 – Apr 25)
- (Serbia) Goran Stanković (2024)
- (Serbia) Miljojko Gošić (July 2023 – December 23)
- (Serbia) Vladimir Jocić (2022 – July 2023)
- (Serbia) Bogiša Stojiljković (2022)
- (Serbia) Marko Terzić (2017 – 2022)
- (Serbia) Ivan Bešinić (September 2014 – 2017)
- (Serbia) Hakija Rovčanin (August 2013 – September 2014)
- (Serbia) Rajko Mitić (December 2011 – August 2013)
- (Serbia) Milija Brkić (September 2010 – December 2011)
- (Serbia) Miodrag Milić (September 2010 – only one game)
- (Serbia) Emil Salifovski (March 2010 – September 2010)
- (Serbia) Vojkan Aleksić (August 2009 – March 2010)
- (Serbia) Miodrag Nikolić (2008 – August 2009)
- (Serbia) Nenad Branković (May 2007–2008)
- (Serbia) Vojkan Aleksić (August 2006 – May 2007)
- (Serbia and Montenegro) ? (July 2004–2006)
- (Serbia and Montenegro) Zaviša Milosavljević (July 2002 – July 2004)
- (Serbia and Montenegro) Nemanja Radulović (February 2001 – June 2002)
- (Serbia and Montenegro) Dragan Ivanov (August 2000 – February 2001)
- (Serbia and Montenegro) Zaviša Milosavljević (September 1999 – August 2000)
- (Serbia and Montenegro) Vladimir Petrović (January 1999 – September 1999)
- (Serbia and Montenegro) Hakija Rovčanin (Summer 1998 – January 1999)
- (Serbia and Montenegro) Milenko Kiković (July 1997 – Summer 1998)
- (Serbia and Montenegro) Zoran Čolaković (June 1995 – July 1997)
- (Serbia and Montenegro) Vladimir Petrović (May 1994 – June 1995)
- (Serbia and Montenegro) Slobodan Perišić (August 1993 – May 1994)
- (Serbia and Montenegro) Budislav Pajić (February 1993 – August 1993)
- (Socialist Federal Republic of Yugoslavia) Slobodan Perišić (September 1990 – February 1993)
- (Socialist Federal Republic of Yugoslavia) Hakija Rovčanin (April 1990 – September 1990)
- (Socialist Federal Republic of Yugoslavia) Ištvan Šorban (December 1987 – April 1990)
- (Socialist Federal Republic of Yugoslavia) Slobodan Radović (April 1987 – December 1987)
- (Socialist Federal Republic of Yugoslavia) Nedeljko Pilčević (June 1986 – April 1987)
- (Socialist Federal Republic of Yugoslavia) Milan Damnjanović (January 1986 – June 1986)
- (Socialist Federal Republic of Yugoslavia) Slobodan Perišić (August 1978 – January 1986)
- (Socialist Federal Republic of Yugoslavia) Radojica Radojičić (1977/78)
- (Socialist Federal Republic of Yugoslavia) Pavao Rajzner (May 1976 – until the end of the season 1976/77)
- (Socialist Federal Republic of Yugoslavia) Dragutin Spasojević (October 1974 – May 1976)
- (Socialist Federal Republic of Yugoslavia) Milan Icić (Autumn 1973 – October 1974)
- (Socialist Federal Republic of Yugoslavia) Boris Marović (July 1973 – Autumn 1973)
- (Socialist Federal Republic of Yugoslavia) Dragutin Spasojević (December 1972–1973)
- (Socialist Federal Republic of Yugoslavia) Simo Vilić (August 1972 – December 1972)
- (Socialist Federal Republic of Yugoslavia) Marcel Žigante (1968–1972)
- (Socialist Federal Republic of Yugoslavia) Radojica Radojičić (1966–1968)
- (Socialist Federal Republic of Yugoslavia) Milivoje Bakovljev (June 1965 – December 1965)
- (Socialist Federal Republic of Yugoslavia) Branislav Aćimović (January 1964 – June 1965)
- (Socialist Federal Republic of Yugoslavia) Boris Marović (October 1963 – until the end of the season 1963/64)
- (Socialist Federal Republic of Yugoslavia) Miodrag Arunović (August 1963 – October 1963)
- (Albania) Asim Fehmi (June 1963 – August 1963)
- (Socialist Federal Republic of Yugoslavia) Petar Purić (January 1963 – June 1963)
- (Socialist Federal Republic of Yugoslavia) Abdulah Gegić (1961–1963)
- (Socialist Federal Republic of Yugoslavia) Ilija Rajković (January 1961 – until the end of the season 1960/61)
- (Socialist Federal Republic of Yugoslavia) Babanović (1960 – until the second half of the season 1960/61)
- (Socialist Federal Republic of Yugoslavia) Dragoljub Nikolić (1960 – only coached 5 competitive matches in 1960/61)
- (Socialist Federal Republic of Yugoslavia) Boško Ralić (1958–1960)
- (Socialist Federal Republic of Yugoslavia) Petar Purić (1956–1958)
- (Socialist Federal Republic of Yugoslavia) Budimir Milivojević (1952–1956))
- (France) Gallois (1919–?)
