= HNK Borovo =

Croatian football club

- Full name: Hrvatski nogometni klub Borovo
- Founded: 1933; 93 years ago
- Ground: Borovo Naselje Stadium
- Capacity: 6,000
- Manager: Vjekoslav Karaula
- League: Vukovar-Srijem County First League
- 2008–09: 11th
Home colours	Away colours

HNK Borovo is a football club based in the city of Vukovar, Croatia.

== Historic names ==
- SK Bata Borovo (1933–1941)
- HŠK Bata Borovo (1941–1945)
- FD Bata (1945–1946)
- SFD Slaven (1946–1954)
- NK Borovo (1954–1991)
- HNK Borovo (2005–present)

== History ==
The club was formed in 1933 as Bata SK by Tomáš Baťa, and it was the promotional team for the Bata Borovo factory. Initially the company did not have its own club, but it was represented by the earlier existing VASK (Vukovarski Amaterski Sportski Klub). With the creation and official opening of a new football field in 1933, VASK was disestablished, and in its place was created in October 1933 a new club, SK Bata.

Between 1933 and 1939 the club competed in the regional league of Osijek. In 1939, after winning their provincial league they earned the first ever opportunity to play at national level. For that season, Bata brought to their ranks a new coach, the Hungarian Sándor Nemes, and players such as Milan Antolković from Građanski Zagreb, Đorđe Lojančić and Nikola Perlić from SK Jugoslavija, Slavko Šurdonja from BSK Belgrade, among others. Nemes came in July 1938 coming from BSK, to replace Bilek which had left Bata. They were placed in the Serbian League, which, after the creation of a separate league of the Banovina of Croatia in 1940, became the only Croatian club to compete in the 1940-41 Serbian League. After that season, however, it joined other Croatian clubs in the 1942 Croatian First League.

After the end of the Second World War and with the re-establishment of the Yugoslav league system, the club changed its name to SFD Slaven, to be renamed again in 1954 into NK Borovo and to play as such all the way until the Croatian War of Independence and subsequent disintegration of Yugoslavia beginning in 1991. Its more successful period was between the mid-1950s until the mid-1970s when the club on several occasions fought for promotion into the Yugoslav First League. It played mostly in the Yugoslav Second League and on three occasions reaches the quarter-finals of the Yugoslav Cup.

The club was re-established in 2005 as HNK Borovo and begins competing in the local lower leagues.

== Coaches ==
- (Austria) Anton Bilek (1936–1938)
- (Hungary) Sándor Nemes (1938–1939)
