= List of NK Široki Brijeg managers =

Nogometni klub Široki Brijeg is a professional football club based in Široki Brijeg, Bosnia and Herzegovina, which plays in the Premier League of Bosnia and Herzegovina. This chronological list comprises all those who have held the position of club manager since the club's formation in 1948.

In Široki Brijeg's history, 46 managers have so far managed the club, with some doing so on more than one occasion and three of them acting as interim managers. The club's first manager was Luka Ljubičić, who managed the club from 1948 until 1949. The club's longest serving manager was Tomo Knezović, who led the team from 1962 to 1968. The current manager is Marijo Tot.

== Managerial history ==
The following is the full list of Široki Brijeg managers and their respective time on that position:

- (Socialist Federal Republic of Yugoslavia) Luka Ljubičić (1948–1949)
- (Socialist Federal Republic of Yugoslavia) Zvonimir Buntić (1949–1950)
- (Socialist Federal Republic of Yugoslavia) Božo Kvesić (1950–1952)
- (Socialist Federal Republic of Yugoslavia) Sudo Muminagić (1952–1954)
- (Socialist Federal Republic of Yugoslavia) Miljenko Perkušić (1954–1956)
- (Socialist Federal Republic of Yugoslavia) Tomislav Čarapin (1956–1958)
- (Socialist Federal Republic of Yugoslavia) Alija Kajić (1958–1960)
- (Socialist Federal Republic of Yugoslavia) Karlo Mikulić (1960–1962)
- (Socialist Federal Republic of Yugoslavia) Tomo Knezović (1962–1968)
- (Socialist Federal Republic of Yugoslavia) Ivan "Duka" Mandić (1968–1972)
- (Socialist Federal Republic of Yugoslavia) Franjo Džidić (1972–1974)
- (Socialist Federal Republic of Yugoslavia) Ante Mikulić (1974–1975)
- (Socialist Federal Republic of Yugoslavia) Zdravko Leko (1975–1976)
- (Socialist Federal Republic of Yugoslavia) Drago Zovko (1976–1978)
- (Socialist Federal Republic of Yugoslavia) Vlado Zelenika (1978–1980)
- (Socialist Federal Republic of Yugoslavia) Ivan "Duka" Mandić (1980–1982)
- (Socialist Federal Republic of Yugoslavia) Miroslav Kordić (1982–1984)
- (Socialist Federal Republic of Yugoslavia) Drago Zovko (1984–1986)
- (Socialist Federal Republic of Yugoslavia) Žarko Skoko (1986–1991)
- (Socialist Federal Republic of Yugoslavia) Miljenko Ćužić (1991–1992)
- (Bosnia and Herzegovina) Nusret Čerkić (1992–1994)
- (Bosnia and Herzegovina) Žarko Barbarić (30 May 1994 – 29 June 1996)
- (Bosnia and Herzegovina) Franjo Džidić (30 June 1996 – 1 July 1997)
- (Bosnia and Herzegovina) (Bosnia and Herzegovina) Žarko Barbarić (1 July 1997 – 31 December 1998)
- (Croatia) Boris Tičić (1 January 1999 – 5 March 1999)
- (Bosnia and Herzegovina) Ivo Knežević (6 March 1999 – 30 June 1999)
- (Croatia) Miroslav Buljan (1 July 1999 – 30 June 2001)
- (Croatia) Davor Mladina (30 June 2001 – 1 July 2002)
- (Bosnia and Herzegovina) Ivo Ištuk (1 July 2002 – 25 July 2004)
- (Bosnia and Herzegovina) Ivica Barbarić (26 July 2004 – 20 August 2006)
- (Croatia) Ivica Kalinić (21 August 2006 – 1 June 2007)
- (Bosnia and Herzegovina) Ivica Barbarić (1 June 2007 – 3 September 2007)
- (Bosnia and Herzegovina) Mario Ćutuk (4 September 2007 – 13 May 2008)
- (Croatia) Ivan Katalinić (17 July 2008 – 23 May 2009)
- (Bosnia and Herzegovina) Ivica Barbarić (4 June 2009 – 29 August 2009)
- (Bosnia and Herzegovina) Toni Karačić (30 August 2009 – 26 May 2010)
- (Bosnia and Herzegovina) Ivo Ištuk (May 27 2010 – March 13 2011)
- (Bosnia and Herzegovina) Blaž Slišković (24 March 2011 – 4 June 2011)
- (Bosnia and Herzegovina) Mario Ćutuk (4 June 2011 – 9 July 2011)
- (Croatia) Branko Karačić (9 July 2011 – 19 March 2012)
- (Slovenia) Marijan Bloudek (20 March 2012 – 6 August 2012)
- (Bosnia and Herzegovina) Anto Kokić (interim) (6 August 2012 – 13 August 2012)
- (Bosnia and Herzegovina) Slaven Musa (13 August 2012 – 19 April 2015)
- (Bosnia and Herzegovina) Blaž Slišković (19 April 2015 – 30 June 2015)
- (Croatia) Davor Mladina (8 June 2015 – 9 September 2015)
- (Bosnia and Herzegovina) Slaven Musa (10 September 2015 – 5 July 2016)
- (Croatia) Branko Karačić (8 July 2016 – 3 October 2016)
- (Bosnia and Herzegovina) Denis Ćorić (interim) (3 October 2016 – 16 January 2017)
- (Croatia) Goran Sablić (17 January 2017 – 6 June 2018)
- (Croatia) Boris Pavić (9 June 2018 – 27 August 2018)
- (North Macedonia) Goce Sedloski (31 August 2018 – 23 July 2019)
- (Bosnia and Herzegovina) Denis Ćorić (27 July 2019 – 15 September 2019)
- (Bosnia and Herzegovina) Toni Karačić (15 September 2019 – 5 August 2021)
- (Bosnia and Herzegovina) Jure Ivanković (5 August 2021 (Note: Ivanković served as caretaker manager until 9 September 2021, when he was hired on a permanent basis.) – 21 April 2022)
- (Bosnia and Herzegovina) Ivica Barbarić (25 April 2022 – 3 June 2023)
- (Croatia) Marijan Budimir (16 June 2023 – 23 December 2023)
- (Croatia) Dino Skender (30 December 2023 – 12 May 2024)
- (Bosnia and Herzegovina) Boris Pandža (interim) (12 May 2024 – 3 June 2024)
- (Bosnia and Herzegovina) Toni Karačić (3 June 2024 – 27 November 2024)
- (Bosnia and Herzegovina) Boris Pandža (interim) (27 November 2024 – 20 December 2024)
- (Croatia) Dean Klafurić (20 December 2024 – 6 January 2026)
- (Croatia) Damir Milanović (8 January 2026 – 15 September 2026)
- (Croatia) Marijo Tot (15 September 2026 – present)
