= 2024–25 Premier League of Bosnia and Herzegovina =

Premijer liga
- Season: 2024–25
- Dates: 3 August 2024 – 31 May 2025
- Champions: Zrinjski; 9th Premier League title 9th Bosnian title
- Relegated: Igman; GOŠK; Sloboda
- Champions League: Zrinjski
- Conference League: Borac; Sarajevo; Željezničar
- Matches: 198
- Goals: 528 (2.67 per match)
- Top goalscorer: Mihael Mlinarić (19 goals)
- Biggest home win: Zrinjski 7–1 Igman (21 October 2024)
- Biggest away win: Sloboda 0–6 Sarajevo (2 November 2024)
- Highest scoring: Zrinjski 7–1 Igman (21 October 2024)
- Longest winning run: Zrinjski (7 matches)
- Longest unbeaten run: Zrinjski (16 matches)
- Longest winless run: Sloboda (18 matches)
- Longest losing run: Sloboda (12 matches)
- Highest attendance: 24,000; Sarajevo 1–1 Željezničar (25 September 2024)
- Lowest attendance: 50; GOŠK 1–2 Sloga (18 April 2025)
- Total attendance: 484,440
- Average attendance: 2,447

The 2024–25 Premier League of Bosnia and Herzegovina (known as the Wwin League for sponsorship reasons) was the 25th season of the Premier League of Bosnia and Herzegovina, the highest football league of Bosnia and Herzegovina. The season began on 3 August 2024 and ended on 31 May 2025, with a winter break between mid December 2024 and mid February 2025.

This was the last season played with 12 teams, as the league was reduced to 10 teams starting from the 2025–26 season. The season also introduced the video assistant referee (VAR) review system.

Zrinjski Mostar won their ninth Premier League title with one match to spare.

== Teams ==
Twelve teams contested in the league – the top ten teams from the previous season and the two promoted from each of the second-level leagues. The promoted teams were Radnik Bijeljina and Sloboda Tuzla, who returned to the top flight after respective absences of two years and one year. They replaced Tuzla City and Zvijezda 09, who were relegated after respective spells of six years and one year in the top flight.

=== Stadiums and locations ===
Locations of the 2024–25 Premier League of BiH teams

Note: Table lists in alphabetical order.

Team	Location	Stadium	Capacity
Borac	Banja Luka	Banja Luka City Stadium	10,030
GOŠK	Gabela	Perica-Pero Pavlović	3,000
Igman	Konjic	Konjic City Stadium	5,000
Posušje	Posušje	Mokri Dolac	5,040
Radnik	Bijeljina	Bijeljina City Stadium	6,000
Sarajevo	Sarajevo (Koševo)	Asim Ferhatović Hase	30,121
Sloboda	Tuzla	Tušanj	7,200
Sloga	Doboj	Luke Stadium	3,000
Široki Brijeg	Široki Brijeg	Pecara	5,147
Velež	Mostar (Vrapčići)	Stadion Rođeni	7,000
Zrinjski	Mostar	Stadion pod Bijelim Brijegom	9,000
Željezničar	Sarajevo (Grbavica)	Grbavica	13,146

=== Personnel and kits ===
Note: Flags indicate national team as has been defined under FIFA eligibility rules. Players and Managers may hold more than one non-FIFA nationality.

Team	Manager	Captain	Kit manufacturer	Shirt sponsor
Borac	(Bosnia and Herzegovina) Mladen Žižović	(Bosnia and Herzegovina) Srđan Grahovac	Kelme	Mtel
GOŠK	(Bosnia and Herzegovina) Damir Borovac	(Bosnia and Herzegovina) Riad Šuta	Joma	WWin
Igman	(Croatia) Alen Peternac	(Bosnia and Herzegovina) Anel Hebibović	Kelme	Igman
Posušje	(Bosnia and Herzegovina) Marko Maksimović	(Bosnia and Herzegovina) Marko Galić	Macron	Formula
Radnik	(Bosnia and Herzegovina) Duško Vranešević	(Bosnia and Herzegovina) Aleksandar Vasić	Kelme	SoccerBet
Sarajevo	(Croatia) Zoran Zekić	(Georgia (country)) Giorgi Guliashvili	Adidas	Turkish Airlines
Sloboda	(Bosnia and Herzegovina) Igor Janković	(Bosnia and Herzegovina) Said Husejinović	Macron	WWin
Sloga	(Bosnia and Herzegovina) Vule Trivunović	(Serbia) Milan Milanović	GB3	Meridian
Široki Brijeg	(Croatia) Dean Klafurić	(Bosnia and Herzegovina) Filip Taraba	Kelme	WWin
Velež	(Serbia) Vladimir Janković	(Bosnia and Herzegovina) Nermin Haskić	Puma	Narentas
Zrinjski	(Croatia) Mario Ivanković	(Bosnia and Herzegovina) Nemanja Bilbija	Macron	M.T. Abraham Group
Željezničar	(Bosnia and Herzegovina) Omer Joldić (caretaker)	(Bosnia and Herzegovina) Sulejman Krpić	Macron	WWin

=== Managerial changes ===
Team	Outgoing manager	Manner of departure	Date of vacancy	Position in the table	Incoming manager	Date of appointment
Široki Brijeg	(Bosnia and Herzegovina) Boris Pandža	End of interim spell	3 June 2024	Pre-season	(Bosnia and Herzegovina) Toni Karačić	3 June 2024
Posušje	(Bosnia and Herzegovina) Denis Ćorić	Mutual consent	6 June 2024	Pre-season	(Bosnia and Herzegovina) Duško Vranešević	17 June 2024
Borac	(Bosnia and Herzegovina) Vinko Marinović	Mutual consent	11 June 2024	Pre-season	(Bosnia and Herzegovina) Mladen Žižović	11 June 2024
Željezničar	(Bosnia and Herzegovina) Dino Đurbuzović	End of interim spell	12 June 2024	Pre-season	(Bosnia and Herzegovina) Denis Ćorić	12 June 2024
Sarajevo	(Slovenia) Simon Rožman	Mutual consent	12 June 2024	Pre-season	(Croatia) Zoran Zekić	12 June 2024
Velež	(Croatia) Dean Klafurić	Mutual consent	17 June 2024	Pre-season	(Austria) Damir Čanadi	27 June 2024
Zrinjski	(Montenegro) Željko Petrović	Mutual consent	20 June 2024	Pre-season	(Croatia) Mario Ivanković	20 June 2024
Igman	(Bosnia and Herzegovina) Adnan Elezović	End of interim spell	22 June 2024	Pre-season	(Bosnia and Herzegovina) Husref Musemić	22 June 2024
Sloboda	(Bosnia and Herzegovina) Zlatan Nalić	Mutual consent	25 July 2024	Pre-season	(Bosnia and Herzegovina) Marko Maksimović	26 July 2024
Velež	(Austria) Damir Čanadi	Sacked	12 August 2024	9th	(Turkey) İrfan Buz	9 September 2024
GOŠK	(Bosnia and Herzegovina) Admir Adžem	Sacked	12 August 2024	12th	(Croatia) Danijel Pranjić	14 August 2024
Sloga	(Bosnia and Herzegovina) Vlado Jagodić	Sacked	25 September 2024	10th	(Bosnia and Herzegovina) Nedim Jusufbegović	30 September 2024
Sloboda	(Bosnia and Herzegovina) Marko Maksimović	Sacked	28 September 2024	11th	(Bosnia and Herzegovina) Zlatan Nalić	16 October 2024
GOŠK	(Croatia) Danijel Pranjić	Mutual consent	27 October 2024	11th	(Bosnia and Herzegovina) Damir Borovac	28 October 2024
Posušje	(Bosnia and Herzegovina) Duško Vranešević	Mutual consent	28 October 2024	5th	(Croatia) Branko Karačić	30 December 2024
Igman	(Bosnia and Herzegovina) Husref Musemić	Resigned	6 November 2024	9th	(Sweden) Zvezdan Milošević	11 January 2025
Široki Brijeg	(Bosnia and Herzegovina) Toni Karačić	Sacked	27 November 2024	7th	(Bosnia and Herzegovina) Boris Pandža (interim)	27 November 2024
Sloboda	(Bosnia and Herzegovina) Zlatan Nalić	Sacked	17 December 2024	12th	(Bosnia and Herzegovina) Igor Janković	9 January 2025
Široki Brijeg	(Bosnia and Herzegovina) Boris Pandža	End of interim spell	20 December 2024	6th	(Croatia) Dean Klafurić	20 December 2024
Posušje	(Croatia) Branko Karačić	Resigned	10 March 2025	9th	(Bosnia and Herzegovina) Marko Maksimović	13 March 2025
Radnik	(Bosnia and Herzegovina) Velibor Đurić	Mutual consent	1 April 2025	8th	(Bosnia and Herzegovina) Duško Vranešević	2 April 2025
Igman	(Sweden) Zvezdan Milošević	Sacked	2 April 2025	10th	(Croatia) Alen Peternac	12 April 2025
Velež	(Turkey) İrfan Buz	Mutual consent	19 April 2025	6th	(Serbia) Vladimir Janković	20 April 2025
Sloga	(Bosnia and Herzegovina) Nedim Jusufbegović	Mutual consent	9 May 2025	5th	(Bosnia and Herzegovina) Vule Trivunović	20 May 2025
Željezničar	(Bosnia and Herzegovina) Denis Ćorić	Sacked	19 May 2024	4th	(Bosnia and Herzegovina) Omer Joldić (interim)	20 May 2025

== League table ==
Pos	Team	Pld	W	D	L	GF	GA	GD	Pts	Qualification or relegation
1	Zrinjski Mostar (C)	33	26	4	3	74	17	+57	82	Qualification for the Champions League first qualifying round
2	Borac Banja Luka	33	26	3	4	58	13	+45	81	Qualification to Conference League first qualifying round
3	Sarajevo	33	18	11	4	59	24	+35	65	Qualification to Conference League second qualifying round (Note: Since the winners of the 2024–25 Bosnian Cup, Sarajevo, finished in the top three of the Premier League, the remaining Conference League first qualifying round spot was passed to the fourth-placed team.)
4	Željezničar	33	20	5	8	55	38	+17	65	Qualification to Conference League first qualifying round
5	Široki Brijeg	33	13	7	13	43	46	−3	46	
6	Sloga Doboj	33	13	5	15	35	45	−10	44	
7	Velež Mostar	33	10	12	11	45	39	+6	42	
8	Radnik Bijeljina	33	12	4	17	44	52	−8	40	
9	Posušje	33	10	7	16	36	41	−5	37	
10	Igman Konjic (R)	33	8	5	20	30	66	−36	29	Relegation to the Prva Liga FBiH
11	GOŠK Gabela (R)	33	4	4	25	28	76	−48	16	Relegation to the Prva Liga FBiH
12	Sloboda Tuzla (R)	33	1	7	25	21	71	−50	7 (Note: Sloboda were deducted 3 points for its players walking off the pitch in protest against officiating decisions in a game against Posušje.)	Relegation to the Prva Liga FBiH

Source: Rezultati.com
Rules for classification: 1) Points; 2) Goal difference; 3) Goals scored; 4) Head-to-head points; 5) Head-to-head goal difference; 6) Head-to-head away goals (only if two teams); 7) Head-to-head goals scored; 8) Goal difference; 9) Play-off. (Criteria 2 and 3 are not used to decide champion, UEFA competition qualification, or relegation)
(C) Champions; (R) Relegated

== Results ==
Home \ Away	BOR	GOŠ	IGM	POS	RAD	SAR	SLO	SLG	ŠB	VEL	ZRI	ŽEL	BOR	GOŠ	IGM	POS	RAD	SAR	SLO	SLG	ŠB	VEL	ZRI	ŽEL
Borac	—	3–0	4–0	2–0	2–0	0–1	2–0	4–0	3–0	2–1	0–1	1–0	—	1–0	—	1–0	—	2–0	2–0	3–1	—	1–0	—	—
GOŠK	0–2	—	0–2	0–1	0–1	0–3	2–0	0–3	1–2	0–4	1–4	0–3	—	—	—	1–2	—	0–2	—	1–2	—	0–1	3–2	—
Igman	0–4	3–2	—	0–3	2–3	0–3	1–0	1–2	0–3	1–1	0–3	0–2	0–1	1–2	—	—	1–1	—	—	—	2–1	—	—	0–1
Posušje	0–2	1–2	1–0	—	3–1	0–0	2–0	1–1	1–2	1–1	1–2	1–1	—	—	2–1	—	—	1–2	—	0–0	—	2–0	1–2	—
Radnik	0–1	3–1	0–1	2–1	—	2–3	2–0	2–1	1–1	4–3	2–0	2–3	1–0	5–0	—	2–1	—	—	—	—	1–1	—	—	1–2
Sarajevo	0–2	3–1	2–1	2–2	2–0	—	3–1	2–0	1–0	4–0	0–1	1–1	—	—	3–0	—	1–1	—	0–0	—	0–1	—	0–0	2–1
Sloboda	2–3	1–1	0–1	0–2	1–0	0–6	—	0–3	0–2	1–1	0–1	0–1	—	3–3	2–2	0–3 (Note: Posušje were given a 3–0 win by default in Round 28 since the match was abandoned due to Sloboda's players walking off the pitch in protest against officiating decisions before the end of the game.)	2–3	—	—	—	—	1–1	—	—
Sloga	0–2	2–0	0–2	3–1	1–0	1–3	1–0	—	1–0	0–0	0–1	4–2	—	—	0–1	—	2–1	0–4	4–1	—	0–1	—	0–4	—
Široki Brijeg	2–3	2–2	4–2	1–0	2–0	3–3	1–1	0–1	—	0–2	1–1	0–3	0–1	2–0	—	0–0	—	—	3–1	—	—	2–5	—	3–2
Velež	0–0	2–2	1–1	3–0	2–1	0–0	1–0	0–0	3–1	—	0–1	1–2	—	—	2–2	—	3–2	2–2	—	3–0	—	—	0–1	—
Zrinjski	1–1	3–0	7–1	3–0 (Note: Zrinjski were given a 3–0 win by default in Round 5 due to Posušje violating the under-21 rule.)	2–0	1–1	3–2	3–1	3–0	1–0	—	1–0	0–1	—	3–0	—	5–0	—	5–0	—	2–1	—	—	5–0
Željezničar	1–1	4–1	3–1	1–0	2–0	0–0	3–0	1–1	0–1	2–1	0–2	—	2–1	3–2	—	3–2	—	—	3–2	1–0	—	2–1	—	—

Source: sportsport.ba
Legend: Blue = home team win; Yellow = draw; Red = away team win.
For upcoming matches, an "a" indicates there is an article about the rivalry between the two participants.

== Top goalscorers ==
Rank	Player	Club	Goals
1	(Croatia) Mihael Mlinarić	Velež	19
2	(Georgia (country)) Giorgi Guliashvili	Sarajevo	16
3	(Serbia) Đorđe Despotović	Borac	15
4	(Bosnia and Herzegovina) Nardin Mulahusejnović	Zrinjski	14
5	(Montenegro) Aleksandar Boljević	Željezničar	11
5	(Bosnia and Herzegovina) Sulejman Krpić	Željezničar	11
5	(Bosnia and Herzegovina) Enver Kulašin	Borac	11
8	(Bosnia and Herzegovina) Nemanja Bilbija	Zrinjski	10
9	(Croatia) Toni Jović	Sloga	9
9	(Croatia) Tomislav Kiš	Zrinjski	9
9	(Croatia) Fran Topić	Zrinjski	9

== Attendances ==
Željezničar drew the highest average home attendance in the 2024–25 Premier League season.

#	Football club	Average attendance
1	Željezničar	8,376
2	Sarajevo	6,224
3	Zrinjski	2,794
4	Velež	2,463
5	Borac	2,282
6	Široki Brijeg	1,747
7	Posušje	1,506
8	Radnik	1,037
9	Igman	894
10	Sloboda	738
11	Sloga	485
12	GOŠK	456
