= 2023–24 Premier League of Bosnia and Herzegovina =

Premijer liga
- Season: 2023–24
- Dates: 29 July 2023 – 26 May 2024
- Champions: Borac; 3rd Premier League title 3rd Bosnian title
- Relegated: Tuzla City; Zvijezda 09
- Champions League: Borac
- Conference League: Zrinjski; Velež; Sarajevo
- Matches: 198
- Goals: 551 (2.78 per match)
- Top goalscorer: Nemanja Bilbija (24 goals)
- Biggest home win: Sarajevo 6–2 Tuzla City (24 November 2023)
- Biggest away win: Zvijezda 09 0–5 Željezničar (20 May 2024)
- Highest scoring: Sarajevo 6–2 Tuzla City (24 November 2023); Tuzla City 2–6 Borac (13 May 2024)
- Longest winning run: Zrinjski (11 matches)
- Longest unbeaten run: Borac (22 matches)
- Longest winless run: Zvijezda 09 (11 matches)
- Longest losing run: Tuzla City (7 matches)
- Highest attendance: 21,000; Sarajevo 3–0 Željezničar (8 October 2023)
- Lowest attendance: 100; On multiple occasions
- Total attendance: 490,560
- Average attendance: 2,477

The 2023–24 Premier League of Bosnia and Herzegovina (known as the Wwin League for sponsorship reasons) was the 24th season of the Premier League of Bosnia and Herzegovina, the highest football league of Bosnia and Herzegovina. The season began on 29 July 2023 and ended on 26 May 2024, with a winter break between mid December 2023 and mid February 2024.

Borac Banja Luka secured a third Premier League title with a match to spare, following a 4–3 victory against Igman Konjic.

== Teams ==
Twelve teams contested in the league – the top ten teams from the previous season and the two promoted from each of the second-level leagues. The promoted teams were GOŠK Gabela and Zvijezda 09, who returned to the top flight after respective absences of four and three years. They replaced Leotar and Sloboda Tuzla, who were relegated after respective spells of two and nine years in the top flight.

=== Stadiums and locations ===
Locations of the 2023–24 Premier League of BiH teams

Note: Table lists in alphabetical order.

Team	Location	Stadium	Capacity
Borac	Banja Luka	Banja Luka City Stadium	10,030
GOŠK	Gabela	Perica-Pero Pavlović	3,000
Igman	Konjic	Konjic City Stadium	5,000
Posušje	Posušje	Mokri Dolac	5,040
Sarajevo	Sarajevo (Koševo)	Asim Ferhatović Hase	30,121
Sloga	Doboj	Luke Stadium	3,000
Široki Brijeg	Široki Brijeg	Pecara	5,147
Tuzla City	Tuzla	Tušanj	7,200
Velež	Mostar (Vrapčići)	Stadion Rođeni	7,000
Zrinjski	Mostar	Stadion pod Bijelim Brijegom	9,000
Zvijezda 09	Ugljevik	Ugljevik City Stadium	5,000
Željezničar	Sarajevo (Grbavica)	Grbavica	13,146

=== Personnel and kits ===
Note: Flags indicate national team as has been defined under FIFA eligibility rules. Players and Managers may hold more than one non-FIFA nationality.

Team	Manager	Captain	Kit manufacturer	Shirt sponsor
Borac	(Bosnia and Herzegovina) Vinko Marinović	(Bosnia and Herzegovina) Srđan Grahovac	Kelme	Mtel
GOŠK	(Bosnia and Herzegovina) Admir Adžem	(Bosnia and Herzegovina) Riad Šuta	Joma	WWin
Igman	(Bosnia and Herzegovina) Adnan Elezović (caretaker)	(Bosnia and Herzegovina) Anel Hebibović	Kelme	Igman
Posušje	(Bosnia and Herzegovina) Denis Ćorić	(Croatia) Luka Lučić	Jako	Formula
Sarajevo	(Slovenia) Simon Rožman	(Bosnia and Herzegovina) Marin Aničić	Adidas	Turkish Airlines
Sloga	(Bosnia and Herzegovina) Vlado Jagodić	(Serbia) Milan Milanović	GB3	Meridian
Široki Brijeg	(Bosnia and Herzegovina) Boris Pandža (caretaker)	(Bosnia and Herzegovina) Marijan Ćavar	Kelme	WWin
Tuzla City	(Bosnia and Herzegovina) Adnan Osmanhodžić (caretaker)	(Bosnia and Herzegovina) Mustafa Šukilović	No1	—
Velež	(Croatia) Dean Klafurić	(Bosnia and Herzegovina) Denis Zvonić	Joma	Narentas
Zrinjski	(Montenegro) Željko Petrović	(Bosnia and Herzegovina) Nemanja Bilbija	Macron	M.T. Abraham Group
Zvijezda 09	(Bosnia and Herzegovina) Bojan Trkulja	(Montenegro) Milan Jelovac	NAAI	WWin
Željezničar	(Bosnia and Herzegovina) Dino Đurbuzović (caretaker)	(Bosnia and Herzegovina) Sulejman Krpić	Macron	The Maniacs

=== Managerial changes ===
Team	Outgoing manager	Manner of departure	Date of vacancy	Position in the table	Incoming manager	Date of appointment
Široki Brijeg	(Bosnia and Herzegovina) Ivica Barbarić	Sacked	3 June 2023	Pre-season	(Croatia) Marijan Budimir	16 June 2023
Zvijezda 09	(Bosnia and Herzegovina) Toni Karačić	End of contract	15 June 2023	Pre-season	(Serbia) Mihajlo Jurasović	19 June 2023
Sarajevo	(Bosnia and Herzegovina) Mirza Varešanović	Mutual consent	22 July 2023	Pre-season	(Slovenia) Simon Rožman	3 August 2023
Igman	(Bosnia and Herzegovina) Husref Musemić	Mutual consent	27 July 2023	Pre-season	(Bosnia and Herzegovina) Dženis Ćosić	3 August 2023
Velež	(Bosnia and Herzegovina) Nedim Jusufbegović	Mutual consent	23 August 2023	4th	(Croatia) Dean Klafurić	30 August 2023
Tuzla City	(Bosnia and Herzegovina) Milenko Bošnjaković	Mutual consent	29 September 2023	11th	(Bosnia and Herzegovina) Adnan Osmanhodžić (interim)	30 September 2023
Igman	(Bosnia and Herzegovina) Dženis Ćosić	Mutual consent	3 October 2023	10th	(Bosnia and Herzegovina) Edis Mulalić	4 October 2023
Željezničar	(Bosnia and Herzegovina) Nermin Bašić	Mutual consent	1 November 2023	8th	(Bosnia and Herzegovina) Haris Alihodžić (interim)	1 November 2023
GOŠK	(Bosnia and Herzegovina) Denis Ćorić	Mutual consent	6 November 2023	10th	(Bosnia and Herzegovina) Toni Karačić	8 November 2023
Željezničar	(Bosnia and Herzegovina) Haris Alihodžić	End of interim spell	7 November 2023	6th	(Saudi Arabia) Abdulhakeem Al-Tuwaijri	7 November 2023
Zvijezda 09	(Serbia) Mihajlo Jurasović	Resigned	15 November 2023	12th	(Serbia) Darko Milisavljević (Note: Milisavljević was initially appointed as caretaker manager, but the move was made permanent on 31 December 2023.)	20 November 2023
Zrinjski	(Croatia) Krunoslav Rendulić	Mutual consent	18 November 2023	3rd	(Croatia) Mario Ivanković (interim)	20 November 2023
Široki Brijeg	(Croatia) Marijan Budimir	Mutual consent	23 December 2023	6th	(Croatia) Dino Skender	30 December 2023
Posušje	(Croatia) Branko Karačić	Sacked	30 December 2023	7th	(Bosnia and Herzegovina) Denis Ćorić	2 January 2024
Tuzla City	(Bosnia and Herzegovina) Adnan Osmanhodžić	End of interim spell	31 December 2023	9th	(Serbia) Slavko Petrović	8 January 2024
Željezničar	(Saudi Arabia) Abdulhakeem Al-Tuwaijri	Resigned	2 January 2024	10th	(Bosnia and Herzegovina) Bruno Akrapović	8 January 2024
Zrinjski	(Croatia) Mario Ivanković	End of interim spell	5 January 2024	2nd	(Montenegro) Željko Petrović	5 January 2024
GOŠK	(Bosnia and Herzegovina) Toni Karačić	Mutual consent	12 February 2024	8th	(Bosnia and Herzegovina) Admir Adžem	13 February 2024
Zvijezda 09	(Serbia) Darko Milisavljević	Mutual consent	22 March 2024	12th	(Bosnia and Herzegovina) Bojan Trkulja	27 March 2024
Tuzla City	(Serbia) Slavko Petrović	Mutual consent	31 March 2024	10th	(Bosnia and Herzegovina) Adnan Osmanhodžić (interim)	31 March 2024
Željezničar	(Bosnia and Herzegovina) Bruno Akrapović	Mutual consent	20 April 2024	11th	(Bosnia and Herzegovina) Dino Đurbuzović (interim)	20 April 2024
Igman	(Bosnia and Herzegovina) Edis Mulalić	Mutual consent	27 April 2024	10th	(Bosnia and Herzegovina) Adnan Elezović (interim)	27 April 2024
Široki Brijeg	(Croatia) Dino Skender	Mutual consent	12 May 2024	8th	(Bosnia and Herzegovina) Boris Pandža (interim)	12 May 2024

== League table ==
Pos	Team	Pld	W	D	L	GF	GA	GD	Pts	Qualification or relegation
1	Borac Banja Luka (C)	33	24	6	3	68	26	+42	78	Qualification for the Champions League first qualifying round
2	Zrinjski Mostar	33	24	4	5	76	27	+49	76	Qualification to Conference League second qualifying round (Note: Since the winners of the 2023–24 Bosnian Cup, Zrinjski, finished in the top two of the Premier League, the Conference League first qualifying round spot was passed to the fourth-placed team.)
3	Velež Mostar	33	16	11	6	50	28	+22	59	Qualification to Conference League first qualifying round
4	Sarajevo	33	16	8	9	57	38	+19	53 (Note: Sarajevo were deducted 3 points for having its players leave the pitch in protest of multiple officiating decisions during a Bosnian Cup game against Borac.)	Qualification to Conference League first qualifying round
5	Posušje	33	13	9	11	35	29	+6	48	
6	Željezničar	33	13	4	16	35	36	−1	43	
7	Sloga Doboj	33	13	3	17	37	50	−13	42	
8	Široki Brijeg	33	11	6	16	37	45	−8	39	
9	GOŠK Gabela	33	8	10	15	38	64	−26	34	
10	Igman Konjic	33	9	6	18	40	67	−27	33	
11	Tuzla City (R)	33	7	6	20	45	69	−24	27	Relegation to the Prva Liga FBiH
12	Zvijezda 09 (R)	33	6	3	24	33	72	−39	21	Relegation to the Prva Liga RS

Source: Rezultati.com
Rules for classification: 1) Points; 2) Goal difference; 3) Goals scored; 4) Head-to-head points; 5) Head-to-head goal difference; 6) Head-to-head away goals (only if two teams); 7) Head-to-head goals scored; 8) Goal difference; 9) Play-off. (Criteria 2 and 3 are not used to decide champion, UEFA competition qualification, or relegation)
(C) Champions; (R) Relegated

== Results ==
=== Rounds 1–22 ===
Home \ Away	BOR	GOŠ	IGM	POS	SAR	SLG	ŠB	TUZ	VEL	ZRI	ZVI	ŽEL
Borac	—	3–0	4–1	1–0	1–1	5–0	1–0	2–1	2–0	0–0	4–2	3–2
GOŠK	0–3	—	4–0	1–1	2–2	2–4	0–0	1–4	0–4	1–5	2–0	1–0
Igman	0–1	1–2	—	2–1	1–2	1–0	1–0	2–0	2–4	0–2	3–1	2–0
Posušje	0–2	0–0	4–1	—	0–1	4–0	1–2	1–1	1–0	2–2	2–0	1–0
Sarajevo	1–1	3–0	2–2	3–0	—	1–2	1–3	6–2	1–0	1–0	2–0	3–0
Sloga	0–4	3–2	4–1	1–0	3–0	—	1–0	2–1	0–0	1–1	1–0	3–0
Široki Brijeg	0–2	2–0	2–0	1–1	1–0	0–1	—	1–0	2–2	0–2	2–1	2–0
Tuzla City	1–2	2–2	3–1	0–1	1–2	3–0	2–0	—	1–1	2–4	2–0	3–0
Velež	0–0	0–0	1–1	2–1	1–0	4–2	1–1	1–1	—	3–0	5–0	1–0
Zrinjski	0–1	3–1	5–0	0–1	2–0	2–0	3–1	3–1	3–0	—	5–3	2–1
Zvijezda 09	1–2	1–2	3–4	0–2	1–0	1–0	3–0	1–1	0–0	2–1	—	2–1
Željezničar	2–0	2–3	1–0	1–1	3–0	1–0	2–1	3–1	0–1	0–0	1–0	—

Source: sportsport.ba
Legend: Blue = home team win; Yellow = draw; Red = away team win.
For upcoming matches, an "a" indicates there is an article about the rivalry between the two participants.

=== Rounds 23–33 ===
Home \ Away	BOR	GOŠ	IGM	POS	SAR	SLG	ŠB	TUZ	VEL	ZRI	ZVI	ŽEL
Borac		3–1	4–3	1–0		1–0				1–2	3–1	
GOŠK				0–1		1–1		1–0		1–4		1–2
Igman		0–0		1–1		2–0				1–4		0–0
Posušje						2–1	1–0	1–1		0–1	2–0	1–0
Sarajevo	1–1	4–0	3–2	1–1					3–0		2–1	
Sloga					0–1		2–3	3–1		0–2	2–0	0–3
Široki Brijeg	1–2	2–2	4–1		2–2				0–1			
Tuzla City	2–6		1–2		1–5		3–1		1–5			
Velež	1–1	3–3	2–0	2–0		1–0					3–1	
Zrinjski					4–3		3–0	4–0	1–0		4–0	2–0
Zvijezda 09		1–2	2–2				2–3	3–2				0–5
Željezničar	2–1				0–0		1–0	2–0	0–1			

Source: sportsport.ba
Legend: Blue = home team win; Yellow = draw; Red = away team win.
For upcoming matches, an "a" indicates there is an article about the rivalry between the two participants.

== Top goalscorers ==
Rank	Player	Club	Goals
1	(Bosnia and Herzegovina) Nemanja Bilbija	Zrinjski	24
2	(Bosnia and Herzegovina) Hamza Čataković	Sarajevo	17
3	(Serbia) Dejan Vidić	Sloga	16
4	(Croatia) Mario Ćuže	Zrinjski	12
4	(Bosnia and Herzegovina) Nermin Haskić	Velež	12
4	(Bosnia and Herzegovina) Jovo Lukić	Borac	12
7	(Serbia) Đorđe Pantelić	Tuzla City	11
8	(Brazil) Renan Oliveira	Sarajevo	10
9	(Bosnia and Herzegovina) Esmir Hasukić	GOŠK	9
9	(Bosnia and Herzegovina) Mirsad Ramić	Igman	9

== Attendances ==
Željezničar drew the highest average home attendance in the 2023–24 Premier League season.

No.	Club	Average
1	Željezničar	7,057
2	Sarajevo	7,009
3	Velež	3,094
4	Borac	3,006
5	Posušje	2,576
6	Zrinjski	2,394
7	Igman	1,175
8	Široki Brijeg	1,034
9	GOŠK	681
10	Sloga	461
11	Tuzla City	428
12	Zvijezda 09	386
