= Idol Nacije =

Annual award

The Bosnian Footballer of the Year, renamed to Idol Nacije (English translation: The Idol of the nation) in 2008, is an annual award given to the best Bosnian football player of the year, as well as recognising and awarding other sports men and women, coaches and game officials in the country. The event was held in 2001 under the Bosnian banner for the first time, with Sergej Barbarez winning the most prestigious award for best player of the year.

From 2008 to 2013, the awards was organized by sports news/media website Sportsport.ba and broadcast on NTV Hayat and was expanded to include many other award categories. Edin Džeko won three Idol Nacije awards in a row. Vedad Ibišević and Asmir Begović were the only other winners. From 2010 awards, it was decided that former player Muhamed Konjić would nominate 10 players for the main award of player of the year. In 2008 Sergej Barbarez had this honor, while Mehmed Baždarević received the task in 2009.

In 2011, it was announced that the ceremony would be held before the end of June, and that all future events would take place during the summer, rather than the winter period. The awards therefore are given for performances during the previous season, rather than for the previous calendar year. Since 2017, the awards have been given out under the name Kristalnih 11.

== List of winners ==
During the days of Yugoslavia, the award was run collectively on the entire former Yugoslavia territory by newspaper Večernji list from 1972 until the breakup of Yugoslavia. Some of the past winners from the Socialist Republic of Bosnia and Herzegovina in those times include:

Year	Player	Nationality	Club
1972	Dušan Bajević	Yugoslavia	Velež
1973	Enver Marić	Yugoslavia	Velež
1974	Josip Katalinski	Yugoslavia	Željezničar
1979	Safet Sušić	Yugoslavia	Sarajevo
1985	Blaž Slišković	Yugoslavia	Hajduk Split
1986	Semir Tuce	Yugoslavia	Velež

=== Idol Nacije ===
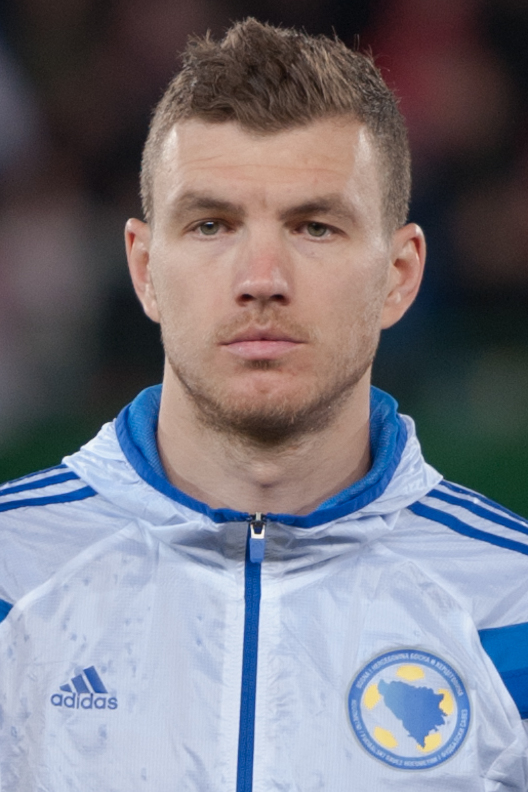
Edin Džeko is a three-time winner of the Idol Nacije - Player of the Year award

Past winners from the modern-day state of Bosnia and Herzegovina include:

Year	Player	Club
1996	Meho Kodro (1)	(Spain) CD Tenerife
1997	Meho Kodro (2)	(Spain) CD Tenerife
1998	Elvir Baljić (1)	(Turkey) Fenerbahçe
1999	Elvir Baljić (2)	(Spain) Real Madrid
2000	Hasan Salihamidžić (1)	(Germany) Bayern Munich
2001	Sergej Barbarez (1)	(Germany) Hamburger SV
2002	Sergej Barbarez (2)	(Germany) Hamburger SV
2003	Sergej Barbarez (3)	(Germany) Hamburger SV
2004	Hasan Salihamidžić (2)	(Germany) Bayern Munich
2005	Hasan Salihamidžić (3)	(Germany) Bayern Munich
2006	Hasan Salihamidžić (4)	(Germany) Bayern Munich
2007	Zvjezdan Misimović (1)	(Germany) 1. FC Nürnberg
2008	Vedad Ibišević	(Germany) 1899 Hoffenheim
2009	Edin Džeko (1)	(Germany) VfL Wolfsburg
2010	Edin Džeko (2)	(Germany) VfL Wolfsburg
2011	Edin Džeko (3)	(England) Manchester City
2012	Asmir Begović	(England) Stoke City
2013	Zvjezdan Misimović (2)	(China) Guizhou Renhe
2014	Miralem Pjanić	(Italy) Roma

=== Kristalnih 11 ===
The Kristalnih 11 ceremony awards the best player, young player and manager in the Bosnian Premier League.

==== Player of the Season ====
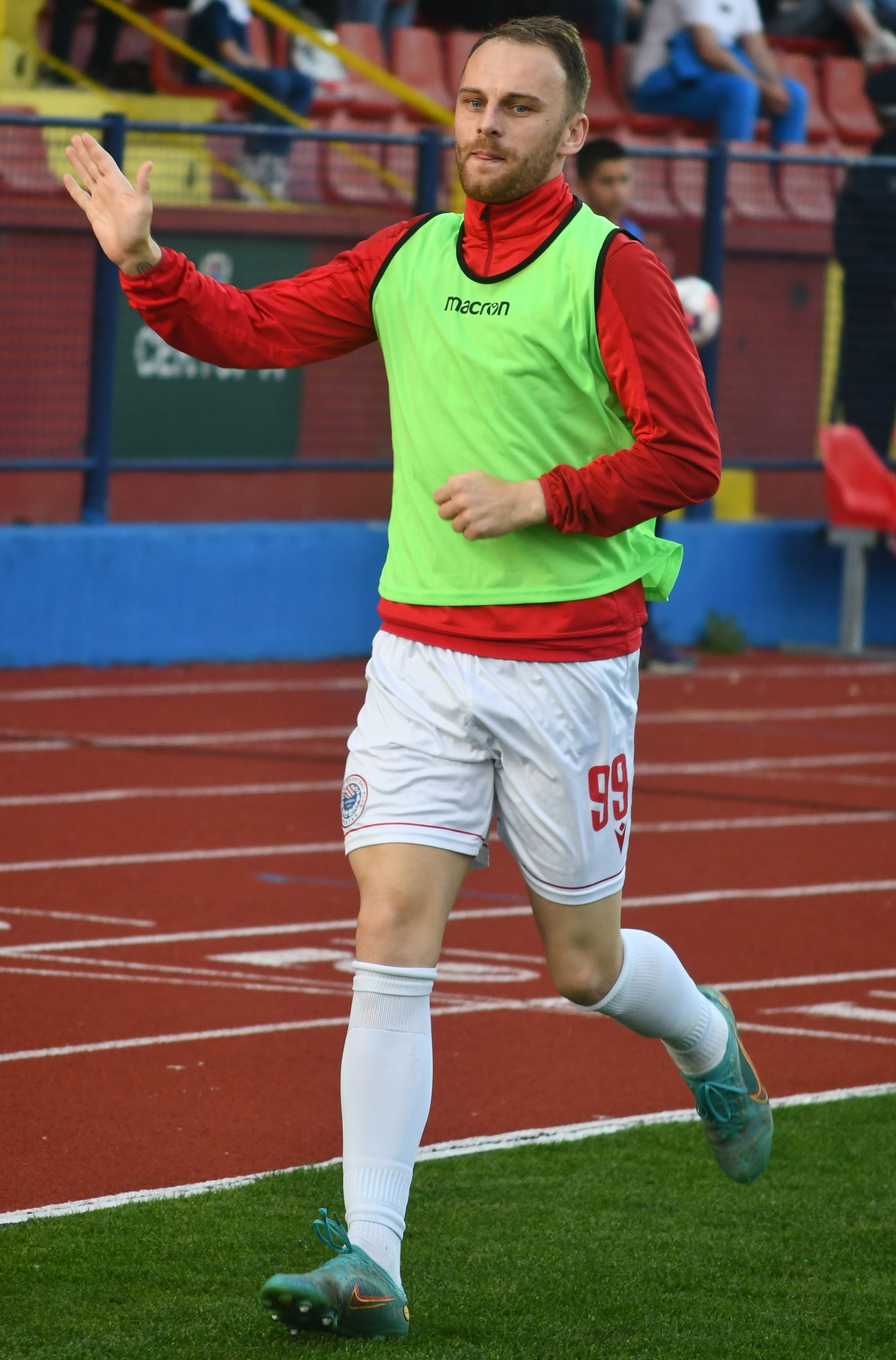
Nemanja Bilbija is a three-time winner of the Kristalnih 11 - Player of the Season award

Season	Player	Position	Nationality	Club
2008	Velibor Đurić	Midfielder	Bosnia and Herzegovina	Zrinjski
2009	Amer Osmanagić	Midfielder	Bosnia and Herzegovina	Velež
2010	Vule Trivunović	Defender	Bosnia and Herzegovina	Borac
2011–12	Zajko Zeba (1)	Midfielder	Bosnia and Herzegovina	Željezničar
2012–13	Saša Kajkut	Forward	Bosnia and Herzegovina	Čelik
2013–14	Not held			
2014–15	Wagner	Midfielder	Brazil	Široki Brijeg
2015–16	Zajko Zeba (2)	Midfielder	Bosnia and Herzegovina	Sloboda
2016–17	Miroslav Stevanović	Midfielder	Bosnia and Herzegovina	Željezničar
2017–18	Goran Zakarić (1)	Midfielder	Bosnia and Herzegovina	Željezničar
2018–19	Mersudin Ahmetović	Forward	Bosnia and Herzegovina	Sarajevo
2019–20	Not held			
2020–21	Goran Zakarić (2)	Midfielder	Bosnia and Herzegovina	Borac
2021–22	Nemanja Bilbija (1)	Forward	Bosnia and Herzegovina	Zrinjski
2022–23	Nemanja Bilbija (2)	Forward	Bosnia and Herzegovina	Zrinjski
2023–24	Nemanja Bilbija (3)	Forward	Bosnia and Herzegovina	Zrinjski
2024–25	Giorgi Guliashvili	Forward	Georgia	Sarajevo
2025–26	Stefan Savić	Midfielder	Austria	Borac

==== Young Player of the Season ====
Season	Player	Position	Nationality	Club
2010	Edin Višća	Midfielder	Bosnia and Herzegovina	Željezničar
2011–12	Josip Kvesić	Defender	Bosnia and Herzegovina	Željezničar
2012–13	Nermin Zolotić	Defender	Bosnia and Herzegovina	Željezničar
2013–14	Not held			
2014–15	Not held			
2015–16	Not held			
2016–17	Luka Menalo (1)	Midfielder	Bosnia and Herzegovina	Široki Brijeg
2017–18	Luka Menalo (2)	Midfielder	Bosnia and Herzegovina	Široki Brijeg
2018–19	Nihad Mujakić	Defender	Bosnia and Herzegovina	Sarajevo
2019–20	Not held			
2020–21	Andrej Đokanović	Midfielder	Bosnia and Herzegovina	Sarajevo
2021–22	Ivan Bašić	Midfielder	Bosnia and Herzegovina	Zrinjski
2022–23	Dal Varešanović	Midfielder	Bosnia and Herzegovina	Sarajevo
2023–24	Muhamed Buljubašić	Midfielder	Bosnia and Herzegovina	Sarajevo
2024–25	Enver Kulašin	Forward	Bosnia and Herzegovina	Borac
2025–26	Matej Deket	Forward	Bosnia and Herzegovina	Borac

==== Manager of the Season ====
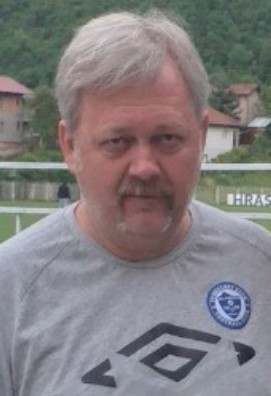
Amar Osim has won the Manager of the Season award three times with Željezničar

Season	Manager	Nationality	Club
2009	Abdulah Ibraković	Bosnia and Herzegovina	Velež
2010	Amar Osim (1)	Bosnia and Herzegovina	Željezničar
2011–12	Amar Osim (2)	Bosnia and Herzegovina	Željezničar
2012–13	Amar Osim (3)	Bosnia and Herzegovina	Željezničar
2013–14	Not held		
2014–15	Not held		
2015–16	Vinko Marinović (1)	Bosnia and Herzegovina	Zrinjski
2016–17	Mehmed Janjoš	Bosnia and Herzegovina	Sarajevo
2017–18	Blaž Slišković	Bosnia and Herzegovina	Zrinjski
2018–19	Husref Musemić	Bosnia and Herzegovina	Sarajevo
2019–20	Not held		
2020–21	Feđa Dudić	Bosnia and Herzegovina	Velež
2021–22	Sergej Jakirović	Bosnia and Herzegovina	Zrinjski
2022–23	Krunoslav Rendulić	Croatia	Zrinjski
2023–24	Denis Ćorić	Bosnia and Herzegovina	Posušje
2024–25	Mario Ivanković	Croatia	Zrinjski
2025–26	Vinko Marinović (2)	Bosnia and Herzegovina	Borac
