= 2018–19 Croatian First Football League =

Hrvatski Telekom Prva liga
- Season: 2018–19
- Dates: 27 July 2018 – 26 May 2019
- Champions: Dinamo Zagreb
- Relegated: Rudeš
- Champions League: Dinamo Zagreb
- Europa League: Rijeka; Osijek; Hajduk Split
- Matches: 180
- Goals: 510 (2.83 per match)
- Top goalscorer: Mijo Caktaš (19)
- Biggest home win: Rijeka 7–0 Inter Zaprešić
- Biggest away win: Istra 1961 0–7 Rijeka
- Highest scoring: Dinamo Zagreb 7–2 Rudeš
- Longest winning run: Dinamo Zagreb (7)
- Longest unbeaten run: Dinamo Zagreb (15)
- Longest winless run: Rudeš (23)
- Longest losing run: Rudeš (8)
- Highest attendance: 26,664; Hajduk Split 0–1 Dinamo Zagreb
- Lowest attendance: 0 Hajduk Split 1–1 Rijeka
- Total attendance: 478,760
- Average attendance: 2,660

The 2018–19 Croatian First Football League (also known as 1. HNL; officially styled Hrvatski Telekom Prva liga for sponsorship reasons) was the 28th season of the Croatian First Football League, the national championship for men's association football teams in Croatia, since its establishment in 1992. The season started on 27 July 2018 and finished on 26 May 2019.

The league was contested by ten teams.

== Teams ==
On 23 April 2018, Croatian Football Federation announced that the first stage of licensing procedure for 2018–19 season was complete. For the 2018–19 Prva HNL, only eight clubs were issued a top level license: Dinamo Zagreb, Gorica, Hajduk Split, Inter Zaprešić, Lokomotiva, Osijek, Rijeka and Slaven Belupo. All of these clubs except Gorica were also issued a license for participating in UEFA competitions. In the second stage of licensing, clubs that were not licensed in the first stage could appeal on the decision.

=== Stadia and locations ===
| Dinamo Zagreb | Gorica | Hajduk Split | Inter Zaprešić |
|---|---|---|---|
| Stadion Maksimir | Gradski stadion Velika Gorica | Stadion Poljud | Stadion ŠRC Zaprešić |
| Capacity: 35,123 | Capacity: 5,000 | Capacity: 34,198 | Capacity: 5,228 |
| Istra 1961 | Locations of teams in 2018–19 Prva HNL | | Lokomotiva |
| Stadion Aldo Drosina | Locations of teams in 2018–19 Prva HNL | | Stadion Kranjčevićeva |
| Capacity: 9,800 | Locations of teams in 2018–19 Prva HNL | | Capacity: 8,850 |
| Osijek | Rijeka | Rudeš | Slaven Belupo |
| Stadion Gradski vrt | Stadion Rujevica | Stadion Kranjčevićeva | Stadion Ivan Kušek-Apaš |
| Capacity: 18,856 | Capacity: 8,279 | Capacity: 8,850 | Capacity: 3,205 |

| Team | City | Stadium | Capacity | Ref. |
|---|---|---|---|---|
| Dinamo Zagreb | Zagreb | Stadion Maksimir | 35,123 | |
| Gorica | Velika Gorica | Gradski stadion Velika Gorica | 5,000 | |
| Hajduk Split | Split | Stadion Poljud | 34,198 | |
| Inter Zaprešić | Zaprešić | Stadion ŠRC Zaprešić | 5,228 | |
| Istra 1961 | Pula | Stadion Aldo Drosina | 9,800 | |
| Lokomotiva | Zagreb | Stadion Kranjčevićeva^{1} | 8,850 | |
| Osijek | Osijek | Stadion Gradski vrt | 18,856 | |
| Rijeka | Rijeka | Stadion Rujevica | 8,279 | |
| Rudeš | Zagreb | Stadion Kranjčevićeva^{1} | 8,850 | |
| Slaven Belupo | Koprivnica | Stadion Ivan Kušek-Apaš | 3,205 | |

- ^{1} Lokomotiva and Rudeš host their home matches at Stadion Kranjčevićeva as their own ground failed to get license for top level football. The stadium is originally the home ground of third-level side NK Zagreb.

| Rank | Counties of Croatia | Number of teams | Club(s) |
|---|---|---|---|
| 1 | City of Zagreb | 3 | Dinamo Zagreb, Lokomotiva, and Rudeš |
| 2 | Zagreb County | 2 | Gorica, Inter Zaprešić |
| 3 | Istria | 1 | Istra 1961 |
| 3 | Koprivnica-Križevci | 1 | Slaven Belupo |
| 3 | Osijek-Baranja | 1 | Osijek |
| 3 | Primorje-Gorski Kotar | 1 | Rijeka |
| 3 | Split-Dalmatia | 1 | Hajduk Split |

=== Personnel and kits ===
| Club | Manager | Captain | Kit manufacturer | Sponsors |
|---|---|---|---|---|
| Dinamo Zagreb | (Croatia) Nenad Bjelica | (North Macedonia) Arijan Ademi | Adidas | Lana grupa |
| Gorica | (Bosnia and Herzegovina) Sergej Jakirović | (Croatia) Igor Čagalj | Alpas | JAF J.u.A. Frischeis |
| Hajduk Split | (Croatia) Siniša Oreščanin | (Croatia) Mijo Caktaš | Macron | Tommy |
| Inter Zaprešić | (Croatia) Samir Toplak | (Croatia) Karlo Muhar | Joma | B2 Assets |
| Istra 1961 | (Croatia) Igor Cvitanović | (Croatia) Marin Grujević | Kelme | Croatia Osiguranje |
| Lokomotiva | (Croatia) Goran Tomić | (Australia) Fran Karačić | Nike | Crodux |
| Osijek | (Croatia) Dino Skender | (Croatia) Mile Škorić | Nike | DOBRO |
| Rijeka | (Croatia) Igor Bišćan | (Austria) Alexander Gorgon | Joma | Sava Osiguranje |
| Rudeš | (Croatia) Tomislav Ivković | (Croatia) Tomislav Mrkonjić | Kelme | |
| Slaven Belupo | (Croatia) Ivica Sertić | (Croatia) Mateas Delić | Adidas | Belupo |

=== Managerial changes ===
| Team | Outgoing manager | Manner of departure | Date of vacancy | Replaced by | Date of appointment | Position in table |
|---|---|---|---|---|---|---|
| Rudeš | (Spain) Jose Manuel Aira | Signed by Sochaux | 22 May 2018 | (Croatia) Ivan Matić | 17 June 2018 | Pre-season |
| Gorica | (Croatia) Ivan Prelec | Signed by Legia Warsaw (assistant) | 4 June 2018 | (Bosnia and Herzegovina) Sergej Jakirović | 18 June 2018 | Pre-season |
| Istra 1961 | (Croatia) Darko Raić-Sudar | Sacked | 10 July 2018 | (Spain) Manolo Márquez | 10 July 2018 | Pre-season |
| Hajduk Split | (Croatia) Željko Kopić | Sacked | 5 September 2018 | (Croatia) Zoran Vulić | 9 September 2018 | 8th |
| Istra 1961 | (Spain) Manolo Márquez | Removed from position | 18 September 2018 | (Spain) Curro Torres | 20 September 2018 | 9th |
| Rudeš | (Croatia) Ivan Matić | Removed from position | 3 October 2018 | (Croatia) Marko Lozo | 3 October 2018 | 10th |
| Rijeka | (Slovenia) Matjaž Kek | Resigned | 6 October 2018 | (Croatia) Igor Bišćan | 9 October 2018 | 5th |
| Istra 1961 | (Spain) Curro Torres | Removed from position | 27 October 2018 | (Croatia) Krunoslav Rendulić | 28 October 2018 | 9th |
| Slaven Belupo | (Croatia) Tomislav Ivković | Removed from position | 10 November 2018 | (Croatia) Ivica Sertić | 21 December 2018 | 7th |
| Hajduk Split | (Croatia) Zoran Vulić | Sacked | 27 November 2018 | (Croatia) Siniša Oreščanin | 27 November 2018 | 6th |
| Rudeš | (Croatia) Marko Lozo | Removed from position | 4 December 2018 | (Croatia) Darko Jozinović | 5 December 2018 | 10th |
| Rudeš | (Croatia) Darko Jozinović | Removed from position | 24 December 2018 | (Croatia) Tomislav Ivković | 24 December 2018 | 10th |
| Istra 1961 | (Croatia) Krunoslav Rendulić | Sacked | 4 March 2019 | (Croatia) Igor Cvitanović | 4 March 2019 | 9th |
| Osijek | (Croatia) Zoran Zekić | Resigned | 29 March 2019 | (Croatia) Dino Skender | 29 March 2019 | 3rd |

== League table ==
| Pos | Team | Pld | W | D | L | GF | GA | GD | Pts | Qualification or relegation |
|---|---|---|---|---|---|---|---|---|---|---|
| 1 | Dinamo Zagreb (C) | 36 | 29 | 5 | 2 | 74 | 20 | +54 | 92 | Qualification for the Champions League second qualifying round |
| 2 | Rijeka | 36 | 19 | 10 | 7 | 70 | 36 | +34 | 67 | Qualification for the Europa League third qualifying round (Note: Rijeka qualified for the Europa League third qualifying round by winning the 2018–19 Croatian Football Cup. As a result, the spot awarded to the runners-up (Europa League second qualifying round) was passed to the third-placed team, and the spot awarded to the third-placed team (Europa League first qualifying round) was passed to the fourth-placed team.) |
| 3 | Osijek | 36 | 18 | 8 | 10 | 61 | 36 | +25 | 62 (Note: Head-to-head points: Osijek 7 pts, Hajduk Split 4 pts.) | Qualification for the Europa League second qualifying round |
| 4 | Hajduk Split | 36 | 17 | 11 | 8 | 59 | 39 | +20 | 62 | Qualification for the Europa League first qualifying round |
| 5 | Gorica | 36 | 17 | 8 | 11 | 57 | 46 | +11 | 59 | |
| 6 | Lokomotiva | 36 | 13 | 10 | 13 | 51 | 43 | +8 | 49 | |
| 7 | Slaven Belupo | 36 | 7 | 16 | 13 | 41 | 53 | −12 | 37 | |
| 8 | Inter Zaprešić | 36 | 9 | 4 | 23 | 40 | 84 | −44 | 31 | |
| 9 | Istra 1961 (O) | 36 | 6 | 7 | 23 | 31 | 73 | −42 | 25 | Qualification for the Relegation play-offs |
| 10 | Rudeš (R) | 36 | 3 | 5 | 28 | 26 | 80 | −54 | 14 | Relegation to Croatian Second Football League |

Source: PrvaHNL.hr
Rules for classification: 1) Points; 2) Head-to-head points; 3) Head-to-head goal difference; 4) Head-to-head goals scored (at home if two teams tied); 5) Goal difference; 6) Goals scored; 7) Play-off
(Note: Criteria 2-4 and 7 is only used if deciding champion, teams to international competition or teams for relegation and in that case criteria 6 will not be used).
(C) Champions; (O) Play-off winners; (R) Relegated

== Results ==
Each team played home-and-away against every other team in the league twice, for a total of 36 matches each played.

| Home \ Away | DIN | RIJ | OSI | HAJ | GOR | LOK | SLA | INT | IST | RUD | DIN | RIJ | OSI | HAJ | GOR | LOK | SLA | INT | IST | RUD |
|---|---|---|---|---|---|---|---|---|---|---|---|---|---|---|---|---|---|---|---|---|
| Dinamo Zagreb | — | 1–1 | 2–1 | 1–0 | 1–0 | 1–0 | 2–1 | 5–3 | 3–0 | 1–1 | — | 3–1 | 3–0 | 3–1 | 3–1 | 3–0 | 3–0 | 1–0 | 1–0 | 7–2 |
| Rijeka | 1–0 | — | 1–1 | 1–1 | 2–0 | 3–0 | 0–0 | 4–0 | 3–3 | 5–1 | 0–0 | — | 3–1 | 0–0 | 1–3 | 1–0 | 2–0 | 7–0 | 2–0 | 3–1 |
| Osijek | 0–2 | 1–2 | — | 4–1 | 0–1 | 2–1 | 1–1 | 6–0 | 3–0 | 3–2 | 2–1 | 2–1 | — | 0–1 | 2–2 | 1–1 | 1–1 | 3–1 | 1–0 | 2–0 |
| Hajduk Split | 0–0 | 1–1 | 0–2 | — | 0–2 | 1–1 | 2–2 | 3–0 | 3–1 | 3–1 | 0–1 | 4–0 | 0–0 | — | 0–0 | 2–1 | 2–0 | 3–2 | 4–1 | 3–0 |
| Gorica | 0–1 | 2–1 | 1–2 | 1–1 | — | 0–3 | 3–3 | 2–3 | 0–2 | 2–0 | 1–2 | 1–0 | 1–0 | 3–0 | — | 0–2 | 4–3 | 2–2 | 4–1 | 3–1 |
| Lokomotiva | 0–1 | 2–0 | 2–2 | 2–0 | 2–2 | — | 1–1 | 4–0 | 1–0 | 1–0 | 1–1 | 1–2 | 0–4 | 0–1 | 2–3 | — | 3–1 | 2–0 | 1–1 | 0–0 |
| Slaven Belupo | 0–2 | 1–1 | 0–2 | 1–1 | 0–1 | 2–5 | — | 2–1 | 3–1 | 1–1 | 0–1 | 1–1 | 1–0 | 1–2 | 2–0 | 1–1 | — | 0–1 | 3–3 | 2–1 |
| Inter Zaprešić | 0–2 | 1–2 | 0–3 | 2–2 | 1–3 | 2–1 | 0–0 | — | 1–2 | 3–0 | 2–3 | 0–3 | 1–3 | 1–3 | 2–2 | 3–2 | 1–3 | — | 3–1 | 0–3 |
| Istra 1961 | 1–4 | 1–2 | 1–1 | 2–4 | 0–2 | 1–2 | 1–1 | 0–2 | — | 1–0 | 0–4 | 0–7 | 1–0 | 0–2 | 0–3 | 0–0 | 1–1 | 0–1 | — | 2–0 |
| Rudeš | 0–3 | 1–2 | 1–4 | 1–4 | 0–1 | 0–4 | 1–1 | 0–1 | 0–3 | — | 0–2 | 2–4 | 0–1 | 1–4 | 1–1 | 1–2 | 0–1 | 2–0 | 1–0 | — |

Source: Prva HNL (in Croatian)
Legend: Blue = home team win; Yellow = draw; Red = away team win.
For upcoming matches, an "a" indicates there is an article about the rivalry between the two participants.

== Relegation play-offs ==
At the end of the season, ninth-placed team Istra 1961 contested a two-legged relegation play-off tie against Šibenik, runners-up of the 2018–19 Croatian Second Football League.

=== First leg ===
31 May 2019
19:00 CEST

| Šibenik | 1–1 | Istra 1961 |
|---|---|---|
| Kukec 14' | Report | Fuentes 16' |

Stadion Šubićevac, Šibenik
Attendance: 3,200
Referee: Ivan Bebek (Rijeka)

=== Second leg ===
3 June 2019
19:00 CEST

| Istra 1961 | 2–0 | Šibenik |
|---|---|---|
| Fuentes 22'; Ivančić 71' | Report |

Stadion Aldo Drosina, Pula
Attendance: 3,209
Referee: Mario Zebec (Cestica)

Istra 1961 won 3–1 on aggregate.

== Statistics ==
=== Top scorers ===
| Rank | Player | Club(s) | Goals |
|---|---|---|---|
| 1 | (Croatia) Mijo Caktaš | Hajduk Split | 19 |
| 2 | (Croatia) Mirko Marić | Osijek | 18 |
| 3 | (Croatia) Jakov Puljić | Rijeka | 16 |
| 4 | (Serbia) Komnen Andrić | Inter Zaprešić (10); Dinamo Zagreb (4) | 14 |
| 4 | (Poland) Łukasz Zwoliński | Gorica | 14 |
| 6 | (Brazil) Jairo | Hajduk Split | 13 |
| 6 | (Croatia) Ivan Krstanović | Lokomotiva (6); Slaven Belupo (7) | 13 |
| 8 | (Croatia) Antonio Čolak | Rijeka | 12 |
| 9 | (Croatia) Kristijan Lovrić | Gorica | 10 |
| 10 | (Switzerland) Mario Gavranović | Dinamo Zagreb | 9 |
| 10 | (Brazil) Héber | Rijeka | 9 |
| 10 | (Argentina) Ramón Mierez | Istra 1961 | 9 |
| 10 | (Croatia) Bruno Petković | Dinamo Zagreb | 9 |

== Awards ==
=== Annual awards ===
| Award | Winner | Club |
|---|---|---|
| Player of the Season | (Spain) Dani Olmo | Dinamo Zagreb |
| Manager of the Season | (Croatia) Nenad Bjelica | Dinamo Zagreb |
| Young Player of the Season | (Spain) Dani Olmo | Dinamo Zagreb |

Team of the Year
| Goalkeeper | (Croatia) Dominik Livaković (Dinamo Zagreb) | | | | |
| Defence | (Bosnia and Herzegovina) Zoran Kvržić (Rijeka) | (France) Kévin Théophile-Catherine (Dinamo Zagreb) | (Austria) Emir Dilaver (Dinamo Zagreb) | (Croatia) Domagoj Bradarić (Hajduk Split) | |
| Midfield | (Brazil) Jairo (Hajduk Split) | (Croatia) Luka Ivanušec (Lokomotiva) | (Spain) Dani Olmo (Dinamo Zagreb) | (Croatia) Domagoj Pavičić (Rijeka) | (Croatia) Jakov Puljić (Rijeka) |
| Attack | (Croatia) Bruno Petković (Dinamo Zagreb) | | | | |

== Attendances ==
| # | Club | Average |
|---|---|---|
| 1 | Hajduk | 8,651 |
| 2 | Rijeka | 4,526 |
| 3 | Dinamo Zagreb | 4,207 |
| 4 | Osijek | 2,534 |
| 5 | Gorica | 2,150 |
| 6 | Istra | 1,341 |
| 7 | Slaven | 1,035 |
| 8 | Lokomotiva | 1,000 |
| 9 | Zaprešić | 701 |
| 10 | Rudeš | 446 |
