= Admir Adžem =

Bosnian football manager (born 1973)

Personal information
- Date of birth: 25 March 1973 (age 53)
- Place of birth: Sarajevo, SFR Yugoslavia
- Height: 1.73 m (5 ft 8 in)
- Position: Full-back

Youth career
- 1983–1991: Željezničar

Senior career*
Years	Team	Apps	(Gls)
1991–1997	Željezničar	32	(5)
1997	Zagreb	5	(0)
1998–1999	Željezničar	19	(0)
1999–2000	Đerzelez	25	(0)
2000–2002	Željezničar	55	(1)
2002–2003	Pogoń Szczecin	19	(0)
2003–2004	Katowice	18	(1)
2004–2005	Željezničar	6	(0)
2005–2007	Zagłębie Sosnowiec	57	(1)
Total		236	(8)

International career
1997–2001	Bosnia and Herzegovina	14	(1)

Managerial career
- 2014: Željezničar
- 2017–2018: Željezničar
- 2020–2023: Al Wasl Youth
- 2023–2024: Goražde
- 2024: GOŠK Gabela
- 2024–2025: Jedinstvo Bihać
- 2025: Željezničar
- * Club domestic league appearances and goals

Admir Adžem (born 25 March 1973) is a Bosnian professional football manager and former player.

== Club career ==
In his playing career Adžem was a full-back. He played for a number of clubs, including hometown club Željezničar on four occasions, Zagreb, Đerzelez, Pogoń Szczecin, GKS Katowice and Zagłębie Sosnowiec where he finished his career.

Adžem played in 104 league games and scored six career league goals for Željezničar, with which he won all of his trophies. While playing for Željezničar he won the Bosnian Premier League twice, in the seasons 2000–01 and 2001–02, the Bosnian Cup once, in the 2000–01 cup season, the same year that Željezničar completed the double. He also won the Bosnian Supercup three times.

Adžem finished his career in 2007 while playing for Zagłębie Sosnowiec at the age of 34.

== International career ==
Adžem made his senior debut for Bosnia and Herzegovina in a February 1997 friendly match against Vietnam and has earned a total of 14 caps, scoring 1 goal. He played in both UEFA Euro 2000 and the 2002 FIFA World Cup qualifying campaigns. His final international was an August 2001 LG Cup match against Iran.

== Managerial career ==
=== Željezničar ===
On 6 June 2014, Adžem was named new manager of Željezničar first team, replacing Dino Đurbuzović who was sacked earlier in the day. In 22 games, he amassed an impressive record of 11 wins, 7 draws and only 4 losses.

On 15 December 2014, Adžem had to be sacked from the position of manager due to not having an UEFA Pro Licence to manage a first team of any club. He went back to coach in the club's Youth School while also working on to finish obtaining his license.

=== Željezničar (youth) ===
Adžem coached the under-19 side of Željezničar from January 2015 to July 2017, with whom he won the Bosnian league title twice. First time in the 2014–15 season and the second time in the 2016–17 season.

In July 2019, Adžem became the new manager of the under-17 team of Željezničar. In his first match as the U17 team manager, his side beat the Borac Banja Luka U17 team on 20 July 2019. Adžem's first loss as the under-17 manager came on 3 August 2019, in a 1–0 away loss to the under-17 team of Zrinjski Mostar. On 27 July 2020, he left the under-17 team of Željezničar.

=== Return to Željezničar ===
On 23 July 2017, Adžem came back to the position of manager of Željezničar after almost three years of his first appointment.

In that season, Adžem won the club's first trophy in 5 years after beating Krupa in the two legged final of the 2017–18 Bosnian Cup. In the first game, Željezničar beat Krupa 2–0 and in the second game 4–2. He also could have won the double since Željezničar was for the majority of the season first in the league, but eventually finished in second place after a poor finish to the season.

Before the start of the pre-season, on 4 June 2018, Adžem was sacked.

=== Al Wasl (youth) ===
On 17 September 2020, it was confirmed that Adžem had become the new youth coach of UAE Pro League club Al Wasl.

=== Goražde ===
In July 2023, Adžem was appointed manager of First League of FBiH club Goražde. He managed his first match as Goražde manager on 13 August 2023, beating Mladost Doboj Kakanj 2–1 away from home.

On 13 February 2024, Goražde announced that Adžem would depart the club for Bosnian Premier League side GOŠK Gabela.

=== GOŠK Gabela ===
On 13 February 2024, Adžem was appointed the new manager of GOŠK Gabela on a one-and-a-half-year deal, replacing Toni Karačić. On his debut four days later, the team beat Igman Konjic 2–1 away from home. On 23 February, Adžem suffered his first defeat as GOŠK manager in a 4–2 home loss to Sloga Meridian. He finished the season with GOŠK in ninth place, avoiding relegation.

After opening the 2024–25 season with two defeats, Adžem was sacked as manager on 12 August 2024.

=== Jedinstvo Bihać ===
On 28 August 2024, First League of FBiH side Jedinstvo Bihać announced the appointment of Adžem as its new manager. He debuted as manager in a 1–0 loss to his former club Goražde on 31 August.

=== Second return to Željezničar ===
On 21 May 2025, Adžem was appointed manager of Željezničar for a third time. He officially took up the role on 10 June 2025, following the end of the season at Jedinstvo. His first competitive game back in charge of Željezničar ended in a 1–1 draw against Koper in the first leg of the 2025–26 UEFA Conference League rirst qualifying round on 10 July 2025. Željezničar was ultimately eliminated by Koper on 17 July, losing 3–1 away in the second leg.

Željezničar started off the league season with a 1–1 home draw against Radnik Bijeljina on 27 July. Adžem recorded his first win back as manager on 3 August 2025, defeating Posušje away. On 15 August, he received a red card at half-time during an away game against Velež Mostar. Despite defeating Velež 1–0, Adžem offered his resignation as manager after the game, citing disappointment with Željezničar's performance. This was rejected by the club's board on 20 August. Unbeaten in their first seven opening games, Adžem's side suffered their first defeat of the league season on 21 September 2025, losing 1–0 away against Široki Brijeg following three disallowed goals. In his first Sarajevo derby back, Željezničar defeated fierce rivals FK Sarajevo 2–0 at home the following week, on 27 September.

On 2 November 2025, Željezničar suffered their first domestic defeat in over a year, losing to Velež 2–1 in the league. After four more winless games, capped by a 4–0 away defeat to Sarajevo on 7 December 2025, Adžem resigned as manager later that day.

== Managerial statistics ==
As of match played 7 December 2025

Managerial record by team and tenure
Team	From	To	Record							
Team	From	To	G	W	D	L	GF	GA	GD	Win %
Željezničar	6 June 2014	15 December 2014	22	11	7	4	32	20	+12	50.00
Željezničar	23 July 2017	4 June 2018	40	26	7	7	65	32	+33	65.00
Goražde	31 July 2023	13 February 2024	17	8	5	4	24	13	+11	47.06
GOŠK Gabela	13 February 2024	12 August 2024	17	3	5	9	18	35	−17	17.65
Jedinstvo Bihać	28 August 2024	21 May 2025	24	9	8	7	27	25	+2	37.50
Željezničar	10 June 2025	7 December 2025	20	7	6	7	23	24	−1	35.00
Total			140	64	38	38	189	149	+40	45.71

== Honours ==
=== Player ===
Željezničar

- Bosnian Premier League: 2000–01, 2001–02
- Bosnian Cup: 2000–01
- Bosnian Supercup: 1998, 2000, 2001

=== Manager ===
Željezničar

- Bosnian Cup: 2017–18
