= Ivan Matić =

Croatian footballer and manager

Personal information
- Full name: Ivan Matić
- Date of birth: 30 April 1971 (age 55)
- Place of birth: Split, SFR Yugoslavia
- Height: 1.85 m (6 ft 1 in)
- Position: Midfielder

Senior career*
Years	Team	Apps	(Gls)
–1997	Hajduk Split		
1997	Wuhan Yaqi		
1998–1999	Chaves	27	(0)
2000–2001	Posušje		
2001–2002	Marsonia	22	(4)
2002–2003	Posušje	17	(2)
2006–2007	First Vienna		
2008–2009	SV Donau		

Managerial career
- 2014: RNK Split
- 2018: Rudeš
- 2019–2020: Novigrad
- 2020–2021: Solin
- 2022: Sloga Mravince
- 2023–: Al-Nassr (Youth Coach)
- * Club domestic league appearances and goals

Ivan Matić (born 30 April 1971) is a retired Croatian professional footballer and manager, who last managed NK Solin.

== Club career ==
Matić began his career in the Yugoslav First League with Hajduk Split. He had a spell with Chaves in the Portuguese Liga, before returning to Croatia to play for NK Marsonia in the Prva HNL.

== Managerial career ==
He was succeeded as manager of Rudeš in October 2018 by Marko Lozo and took the reins at Solin in October 2020. Matić then resigned in October 2021 and replaced Boris Pavić as manager of HNK Sloga Mravince in February 2022.
