= Zlatan Nalić =

Bosnian football manager (born 1969)

Personal information
- Date of birth: 23 January 1969 (age 57)
- Place of birth: Banja Luka, SFR Yugoslavia
- Position: Midfielder

Senior career*
Years	Team	Apps	(Gls)
1989–1990	Sloboda Tuzla		
1990–1992	Borac Banja Luka		
1992–1993	Sloga Kraljevo		
1993–1994	Panathinaikos		
1993–1994	→ Mjällby (loan)		
1994–1996	Mjällby		
1996–1997	Motala		
1997–1999	Kulladal		

Managerial career
- 2015: Sweden U21 (assistant)
- 2017–2018: Prespa Birlik
- 2018–2019: Sloboda Tuzla
- 2020: Tuzla City
- 2023–2024: Sloboda Tuzla
- 2024: Sloboda Tuzla
- * Club domestic league appearances and goals

Zlatan Nalić (born 23 January 1969) is a Bosnian professional football manager and former player.

== Playing career ==
During his playing career, Nalić played for Sloboda Tuzla, where he started his career, Borac Banja Luka, Sloga Kraljevo, Panathinaikos, Mjällby, Motala and Kulladal.

== Managerial career ==
=== Early career ===
Nalić started his managerial career as an assistant manager in the Sweden U21 national team. With them he won the UEFA Euro U21 in 2015. After Sweden, in November 2017, Nalić was named new manager of Swedish fourth tier club Prespa Birlik.

=== Sloboda Tuzla ===
On 31 July 2018, Nalić became the new manager of Bosnian Premier League club Sloboda Tuzla. His first win as the club manager came on 11 August 2018, in the Tuzla derby against Tuzla City, which Sloboda won 1–0. Nalić was praised for bringing a style in Bosnian football which it did not see before.

On 20 April 2019, Sloboda under Nalić also made a big result by beating Sarajevo 2–1 at home and getting back to the UEFA Europa League qualifying "picture". However, poor results during the ending of the season meant an 8th-place finish for Sloboda, only 5 points more than 11th placed and relegated Krupa.

On 3 June 2019, Nalić left Sloboda after his contract with the club expired.

=== Tuzla City ===
On 11 March 2020, Sloboda's city rival, Tuzla City, announced Nalić as the club's new manager. However, he did not get the chance to lead Tuzla in a match until 2 August 2020, because the 2019–20 Bosnian Premier League season was ended abruptly due to the ongoing COVID-19 pandemic in Bosnia and Herzegovina. When the match did come, on 2 August, Nalić's first official game as manager of Tuzla City did not however go to plan as the team lost to Široki Brijeg. His first win as Tuzla City manager was a 1–0 league win against Krupa on 8 August 2020.

Nalić left Tuzla City on 16 October 2020, after a 4–0 away loss to Zrinjski Mostar.

=== Return to Sloboda Tuzla ===
Following Sloboda's relegation to the First League of FBiH in the 2022–23 Premier League season, Nalić returned to manage the club in July 2023. His first competitive game back in charge of Sloboda was a 3–2 home win against Rudar Kakanj on 12 August 2023. He guided the side to promotion to the Premier League after winning the First League of FBiH in the 2023–24 season.

On 25 July 2024, it was announced by Sloboda that Nalić had left the club by mutual consent, prior to the start of the 2024–25 Premier League season.

=== Second return to Sloboda Tuzla ===
In October 2024, it was revealed that Nalić returned to manage Sloboda for the third time, just three months after his sudden departure. Following losing all nine games since his return, Nalić was sacked by the club's board in December 2024.

== Personal life ==
Zlatan is the son of Sloboda Tuzla legend Mesud Nalić. Nalić's son, Adi, is also a professional footballer.

== Managerial statistics ==
As of match played 15 December 2024

Managerial record by team and tenure
Team	From	To	Record							
Team	From	To	G	W	D	L	GF	GA	GD	Win %
Sloboda Tuzla	31 July 2018	3 June 2019	33	11	7	15	27	35	−8	33.33
Tuzla City	11 March 2020	16 October 2020	12	6	1	5	15	15	+0	50.00
Sloboda Tuzla	24 July 2023	25 July 2024	33	23	6	4	60	22	+38	69.70
Sloboda Tuzla	16 October 2024	17 December 2024	9	0	0	9	3	21	−18	0.00
Total			87	40	14	33	105	93	+12	45.98

== Honours ==
=== Manager ===
Sloboda Tuzla

- First League of FBiH: 2023–24
