= Albert Pobor =

Croatian football manager (1956–2022)

Personal information
- Date of birth: 29 May 1956
- Place of birth: Bosanski Novi, People's Republic of Bosnia and Herzegovina, FPR Yugoslavia
- Date of death: 3 March 2022 (aged 65)
- Place of death: Zagreb, Croatia
- Position: Midfielder

Youth career
- Sloboda Bosanski Novi

Senior career*
Years	Team	Apps	(Gls)
1987–1988	Borac Banja Luka		

Managerial career
- Posušje
- 2004: Cerezo Osaka
- 2008–2009: Hrvatski Dragovoljac
- 2010: Segesta Sisak
- 2012–2013: Vrbovec
- 2014–2015: Hrvatski Dragovoljac
- 2017–2018: Brežice 1919
- 2018–2021: Dinamo Zagreb (academy)
- * Club domestic league appearances and goals

Albert Pobor (29 May 1956 – 3 March 2022) was a Croatian football player and manager.

As a player, he won the 1988 Marshal Tito Cup with Borac Banja Luka.

He worked as a scout and youth coach at Dinamo Zagreb from February 2018 to the end of August 2021.

He died on 3 March 2022, at the age of 65.

== Managerial statistics ==
Team	From	To	Record				
Team	From	To	G	W	D	L	Win %
Cerezo Osaka	2004	2004	13	2	4	7	15.38
Total			13	2	4	7	15.38
