= Boris Pavić =

Croatian footballer and manager

Personal information
- Date of birth: 4 December 1973 (age 52)
- Place of birth: Sinj, SFR Yugoslavia
- Height: 1.82 m (5 ft 11 1/2 in)
- Position: Defender

Team information
- Current team: Zagora Unešić (manager)

Senior career*
Years	Team	Apps	(Gls)
1991–1993	Inker Zaprešić	25	(2)
1993-1994	Junak Sinj	14	(2)
1994–1995	Inker Zaprešić	37	(1)
1996	Rijeka	1	(0)
1996–1998	Varteks	29	(0)
1998–1999	Segesta		
1999–2001	Rijeka	24	(0)
2001	Chernomorets Novorossiysk	1	(0)
2001–2002	Čelik Zenica	14	(0)
2002–2003	Sydney United 58	15	(0)
2003–2004	Čelik Zenica	24	(5)
2004–2005	Žepče	20	(0)
2005–2006	Croatia Sesvete	12	(1)
2006	Šibenik	7	(0)
2007–2008	Junak Sinj		
2008–2009	RNK Split	10	(0)
2009	Primorac 1929		
2010–2011	Hrvace		

Managerial career
- 2013-2014: OSK
- 2014: Hrvace
- 2015: Čelik Zenica
- 2016: Junak Sinj
- 2016: Vitez
- 2017: Čelik Zenica
- 2017–2018: Rudar Kakanj
- 2018: Široki Brijeg
- 2018–2019: Solin
- 2020: Vodice
- 2020-2022: Sloga Mravince
- 2022: Croatia Zmijavci
- 2022-: Zagora Unešić
- * Club domestic league appearances and goals

Boris Pavić (born 4 December 1973) is a Croatian football manager and former player.

== Managerial career ==
He landed his first managerial job at OSK and was named manager of Hrvace in June 2014. He then joined former club Čelik Zenica in January 2015 and took charge of Junak Sinj in January 2016. In June 2016 he was appointed manager of Vitez, replacing Branko Karačić, only to be dismissed in September that year.

In March 2017, Pavić returned to take charge again of Bosnian side Čelik, after Nedim Jusufbegović resigned due to poor results. In September 2017 he succeeded Elvedin Beganović at Rudar Kakanj.

He was appointed manager of Solin in December 2018. He previously coached Široki Brijeg, but left in August 2018 after 2 1/2 months in the role. He then managed Sloga Mravince from October 2020 until February 2022, when he was replaced by former Solin manager Ivan Matić. He then took charge at Croatia Zmijavci, succeeding Jure Srzic in March 2022, followed by a new position as manager at Zagora Unešić in July 2022.
