= Mateo Andačić =

Croatian footballer

Personal information
- Date of birth: 16 November 1997 (age 28)
- Place of birth: Frankfurt, Germany
- Height: 1.86 m (6 ft 1 in)
- Position: Midfielder

Team information
- Current team: Radnik Bijeljina
- Number: 32

Youth career
- –2011: Kickers Offenbach
- 2011–2015: FSV Frankfurt

Senior career*
| Years | Team | Apps | (Gls) |
| 2015–2018 | FSV Frankfurt | 33 | (3) |
| 2018–2020 | Wacker Nordhausen | 21 | (0) |
| 2020–2021 | Rudeš | 20 | (1) |
| 2021–2022 | Kickers Offenbach | 6 | (1) |
| 2022 | Chemie Leipzig | 3 | (0) |
| 2023–2025 | Vukovar | 72 | (5) |
| 2025–2026 | Posušje | 30 | (0) |
| 2026 | Hatta | 0 | (0) |
| 2026– | Radnik Bijeljina | 5 | (1) |

International career
| 2014–2015 | Croatia U18 | 3 | (0) |
| 2016–2017 | Croatia U19 | 2 | (0) |
- * Club domestic league appearances and goals as of 31 October 2026

Mateo Andačić (born 16 November 1997) is a Croatian professional footballer who plays as a midfielder for Bosnian Premier League club Radnik Bijeljina.

== Career statistics ==
As of match played 31 October 2026

Appearances and goals by club, season and competition
| Club | Season | League | | | National cup (Note: Includes Croatian Cup, Bosnian Cup) | | Other | | Total | |
| Club | Season | Division | Apps | Goals | Apps | Goals | Apps | Goals | Apps | Goals |
|---|---|---|---|---|---|---|---|---|---|---|
| FSV Frankfurt | 2016–17 | 3. Liga | 1 | 0 | — | | — | | 1 | 0 |
| FSV Frankfurt | 2017–18 | Regionalliga Südwest | 32 | 3 | — | | 2 (Note: Appearances in Hesse Cup) | 0 | 34 | 3 |
| FSV Frankfurt | Total | | 33 | 3 | — | | 2 | 0 | 35 | 3 |
| Wacker Nordhausen | 2018–19 | Regionalliga Nordost | 15 | 0 | — | | 3 (Note: Appearances in Thuringia Cup) | 2 | 18 | 2 |
| Wacker Nordhausen | 2019–20 | Regionalliga Nordost | 6 | 0 | — | | 2 | 3 | 8 | 3 |
| Wacker Nordhausen | Total | | 21 | 0 | — | | 5 | 5 | 26 | 5 |
| Wacker Nordhausen II | 2018–19 | NOFV-Oberliga Süd | 3 | 0 | — | | — | | 3 | 0 |
| Wacker Nordhausen II | 2019–20 | NOFV-Oberliga Süd | 6 | 1 | — | | — | | 6 | 1 |
| Wacker Nordhausen II | Total | | 9 | 1 | — | | — | | 9 | 1 |
| Rudeš | 2020–21 | 2. HNL | 20 | 1 | 2 | 0 | — | | 22 | 1 |
| Kickers Offenbach | 2021–22 | Regionalliga Südwest | 6 | 1 | — | | 2 | 0 | 8 | 1 |
| Chemie Leipzig | 2022–23 | Regionalliga Nordost | 3 | 0 | — | | 1 (Note: Appearance in Saxony Cup) | 0 | 4 | 0 |
| Vukovar 1991 | 2022–23 | 1. NL | 15 | 0 | — | | — | | 15 | 0 |
| Vukovar 1991 | 2023–24 | 1. NL | 28 | 0 | 3 | 0 | — | | 31 | 0 |
| Vukovar 1991 | 2024–25 | 1. NL | 29 | 5 | — | | — | | 29 | 5 |
| Vukovar 1991 | Total | | 72 | 5 | 3 | 0 | — | | 75 | 5 |
| Posušje | 2025–26 | Bosnian Premier League | 30 | 0 | 1 | 0 | — | | 31 | 0 |
| Radnik Bijeljina | 2026–27 | Bosnian Premier League | 5 | 1 | 1 | 0 | — | | 6 | 1 |
| Career total | | | 199 | 12 | 7 | 0 | 10 | 5 | 216 | 17 |
