= Vinko Marinović =

Bosnian football manager (born 1971)

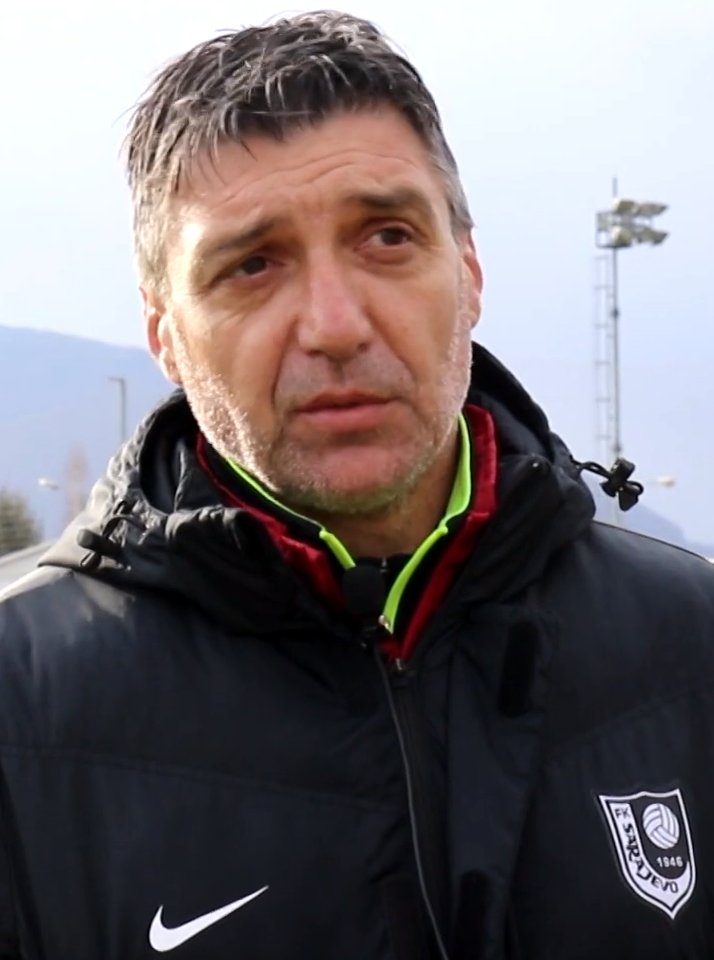
- Marinović with Sarajevo in 2020

Personal information
- Date of birth: 3 March 1971 (age 55)
- Place of birth: Vienna, Austria
- Height: 1.89 m (6 ft 2 in)
- Position: Defender

Team information
- Current team: Borac Banja Luka (manager)

Youth career
- 1980–1988: Kozara Gradiška

Senior career*
Years	Team	Apps	(Gls)
1988–1991	Kozara Gradiška		
1991–1994	Borac Banja Luka		
1995–1999	Red Star Belgrade	90	(10)
1999–2003	Beerschot	40	(1)
2004–2008	Laktaši	108	(31)
2008–2009	Kozara Gradiška		

International career
1998	FR Yugoslavia	1	(0)

Managerial career
- 2010–2011: Kozara Gradiška
- 2012: Kolubara
- 2014–2015: Borac Banja Luka
- 2015–2016: Zrinjski Mostar
- 2017–2019: Bosnia and Herzegovina U21
- 2019–2021: Sarajevo
- 2022–2024: Borac Banja Luka
- 2024–2025: Bosnia and Herzegovina U21
- 2025–: Borac Banja Luka
- * Club domestic league appearances and goals

Vinko Marinović (born 3 March 1971) is a Bosnian professional football manager and former player who is the manager of Bosnian Premier League club Borac Banja Luka. He is regarded as one of the most successful Bosnian football managers.

== Club career ==
Marinović started playing football at nine years of age with the youth teams of Kozara Gradiška. In 1988, he was included in the senior team that competed in those days, still in SFR Yugoslavia in lower tier leagues. His good exhibitions called the attention of the biggest regional club Borac Banja Luka.

With the beginning of the Bosnian War in 1992, Marinović's club was moved to Serbia, and continued, under the same name, to play in the First League of FR Yugoslavia, composed of clubs from Serbia, Montenegro and Borac Banja Luka from Bosnia and Herzegovina. In many statistical football websites, his club, since in those years was playing in the territory of Serbia, is confused with another Serbian top league club, with the same name, Borac, but from another town, Čačak.

In 1995, he moved alongside his teammate Darko Ljubojević to 1991 European and World champions Red Star Belgrade. Marinović soon started playing in the initial squad, and his solid exhibitions and strong character made him the team captain in the next years. After four seasons, he and the club made the decision that was time for him to move abroad, so in the summer of 1999, Marinović signed with Belgian First Division A club Beerschot from Antwerp, where his initial success was stopped by a terrible injury.

After four seasons in Belgium, Marinović decided to return to Bosnia and Herzegovina where he signed with Bosnian Premier League club Laktaši, where he did get his physical condition back, assuming the lead as the captain of the team and playing an impressive 108 league games in four seasons, having scored his best 17 goals. In 2008, Marinović decided to return to his youth years club Kozara Gradiška where he finished his playing career.

== International career ==
Marinović decided to represent the FR Yugoslavia national team (Serbia and Montenegro), for which he played one match. It was on 23 December 1998 in a friendly match in Tel Aviv against, the home side, Israel. He entered as a substitute for Slobodan Komljenović late in the match.

== Managerial career ==
=== Early career ===
After retiring, Marinović graduated in the Managerial Academy in Belgrade and became the manager of his previous club Kozara, with whom he succeeded the promotion to the Bosnian Premier League after winning the 2010–11 First League of RS season.

After getting sacked at Kozara, he was for a short period the manager of Serbian First League club Kolubara in 2012, but a year later became an assistant manager at Borac Banja Luka. Afterwards, he was the manager of Borac from 2014 to 2015.

=== Zrinjski Mostar ===
After a fairly good season as Borac manager, Marinović became the new manager of Zrinjski Mostar. In his second season with Zrinjski, he won the league title one round before the end of the season and was subsequently awarded the Bosnian Premier League Manager of the Season award.

In December 2016, during the league's winter break, Marinović left Zrinjski. At the time Zrinjski were first on the league table.

=== Bosnia and Herzegovina U21 ===
In March 2017, Marinović was named the new head coach of the Bosnia and Herzegovina U21 national team. After the ending of the 2019 UEFA Euro U21 qualification in 2018, Marinović made one of the best results in the qualification finishing third in the group. Four points less than second placed Portugal and six less than first placed Romania.

On 26 December 2018, he signed a new contract which was due to last until October 2022. However, on 26 December 2019, Marinović left the national team to become the new manager of Sarajevo. He officially left the team a day later, on 27 December, terminating his contract with the Bosnia and Herzegovina FA.

=== Sarajevo ===
==== 2019–20 season ====
On 26 December 2019, Marinović came back to club management after three years and became the new manager of Sarajevo. He was officially announced as the new Sarajevo manager four days later, on 30 December, signing a two-and-a-half-year contract. In his first game as Sarajevo manager, Marinović's team beat Tula City 6–2 in a league match on 22 February 2020.

On 1 June 2020, the 2019–20 Bosnian Premier League season ended abruptly due to the COVID-19 pandemic in Bosnia and Herzegovina and by default, Sarajevo, led by Marinović, were crowned league champions for a second consecutive time. This also marked a historic moment for the league as Marinović became the first manager to win the Bosnian Premier League since its formation in 2000 with two different clubs, the first one being Zrinjski and their 2015–16 title win.

==== 2020–21 season ====
Marinović suffered his first loss as Sarajevo manager on 26 August 2020, in a 2020–21 UEFA Champions League second qualifying round match against Dynamo Brest. Ultimately, he would qualify the club to the 2020–21 UEFA Europa League play-off round, where they would get eliminated by Scottish club Celtic and miss out on a chance to play in the group stage.

Marinović made a new Bosnian Premier League record with the club on 30 October 2020, after a league game against Mladost Doboj Kakanj, in which Sarajevo ended the game unbeaten and continued their 12-game unbeaten run in the league since the beginning of the season, surpassing the one of fierce city rivals Željezničar, which was an 11 league game unbeaten run since the start of the 2019–20 Bosnian Premier League season.

In his first ever Sarajevo derby, Marinović's side drew against Željezničar at home in a league match on 4 November 2020, but still continuing their 13-game unbeaten run in the league. He made a new record with Sarajevo by not losing any competitive domestic game in the year 2020, winning 19 and drawing only 6 of their 25 games that year.

Marinović oversaw his first competitive domestic game loss as Sarajevo manager in a league match against his former club Zrinjski, played on 6 March 2021. His first Sarajevo derby win as Sarajevo manager came on 1 May 2021 against Željezničar.

On 12 May 2021, a day after Sarajevo's disappointing home draw against Sloboda Tuzla, Marinović and the club agreed to terminate his contract by mutual agreement due to poor results in the last few games and after losing first place in the 2020–21 season to Marinović's former club Borac Banja Luka.

=== Return to Borac Banja Luka ===
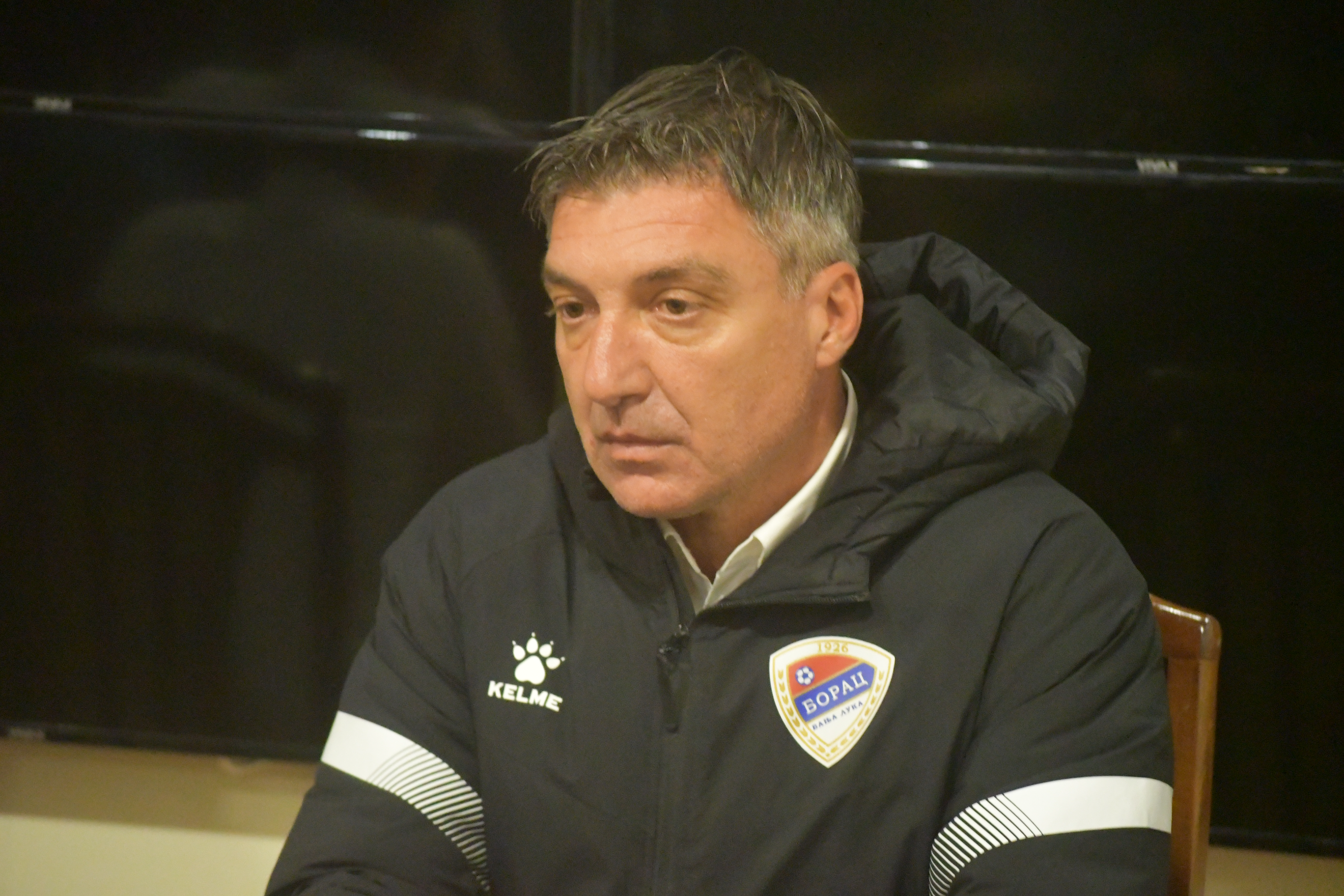
Marinović with Borac Banja Luka in 2023

On 28 August 2022, Borac Banja Luka appointed Marinović as manager for the second time, replacing Nenad Lalatović who resigned two days prior.

His first competitive game back in charge of Borac ended in a 1–0 home win against Zrinjski Mostar on 31 August. On 4 September 2022, Marinović suffered his first defeat as Borac manager in a 2–0 loss to Široki Brijeg. On 18 February 2023, Borac was knocked out by Rudar Prijedor in the second round of the Bosnian Cup following a penalty shoot-out, with Marinović taking the blame for the elimination. He finished the season with the side in second place, securing a place in the 2023–24 UEFA Europa Conference League second qualifying round.

Marinović guided Borac to a league title in the 2023–24 season, becoming the only manager to win a Bosnian championship title with three different clubs. On 23 May 2024, Borac suffered a 2–0 defeat on aggregate to Zrinjski in the Bosnian Cup final, losing out on a chance to win their first domestic double.

On 11 June 2024, it was announced by Borac that Marinović had left the club by mutual consent.

=== Return to Bosnia and Herzegovina U21 ===
On 17 July 2024, the Bosnian FA appointed Marinović as head coach of the Bosnia and Herzegovina U21 national team for the second time. He mutually terminated his contract with the FA on 19 July 2025.

=== Second return to Borac Banja Luka ===
After leaving the under-21 national team, Marinović was revealed as manager of Borac Banja Luka for a third time on 21 July. Borac started off the season with a 6–0 home win over Rudar Prijedor on 27 July. On 29 October 2025, Borac exited the Bosnian Cup in the first round against third tier side Kruševo after a shock 2–0 defeat on penalties, after the game finished 2–2 at full time. Borac were up 2–0 at half time as well.

As the season went on, Marinović's team was credited with playing high-quality football that brought good results, including respective 5–1 and 3–0 home victories over rivals Sarajevo and Zrinjski. Following a 1–0 away win over Sarajevo on 3 May 2026, Borac secured its fourth Bosnian Premier League title, and its second under Marinović. With four Bosnian titles since the league unified in 2002, Marinović has surpassed Amar Osim, who has won three in that period; Osim still leads overall with five titles, including those from the 2000–01 and 2001–02 seasons, all won with Željezničar.

== Personal life ==
Marinović was born in Vienna, Austria, but was brought up in Gradiška. During the Bosnian War, he played for Borac Banja Luka, until his move to Red Star Belgrade.

He was in Belgrade during the NATO bombing of Yugoslavia, after which he moved to Belgium, where he stayed until 2003, returning to Bosnia and Herzegovina. He is married to Klaudija Marinović, with whom he has two daughters.

== Managerial statistics ==
As of match played 21 November 2026

Managerial record by team and tenure
Team	From	To	Record							
Team	From	To	G	W	D	L	GF	GA	GD	Win %
Kozara Gradiška	1 July 2010	18 September 2011	33	19	6	8	53	22	+31	57.58
Kolubara	1 July 2012	30 October 2012	9	1	2	6	7	12	−5	11.11
Borac Banja Luka	18 March 2014	25 March 2015	30	15	5	10	39	33	+6	50.00
Zrinjski Mostar	25 March 2015	27 December 2016	70	42	18	10	125	57	+68	60.00
Bosnia and Herzegovina U21	10 March 2017	27 December 2019	18	9	3	6	33	15	+18	50.00
Sarajevo	30 December 2019	12 May 2021	40	25	10	5	74	33	+41	62.50
Borac Banja Luka	28 August 2022	11 June 2024	71	45	10	16	119	63	+56	63.38
Bosnia and Herzegovina U21	17 July 2024	19 July 2025	6	1	0	5	4	12	−8	16.67
Borac Banja Luka	21 July 2025	Present	62	44	8	10	129	48	+81	70.97
Total			339	201	62	76	583	295	+288	59.29

== Honours ==
=== Player ===
Borac Banja Luka

- Mitropa Cup: 1992

Red Star Belgrade

- First League of FR Yugoslavia: 1994–95
- FR Yugoslav Cup: 1994–95, 1995–96, 1996–97

Laktaši

- First League of RS: 2006–07

=== Manager ===
Kozara Gradiška

- First League of RS: 2010–11

Zrinjski Mostar

- Bosnian Premier League: 2015–16

Sarajevo

- Bosnian Premier League: 2019–20

Borac Banja Luka

- Bosnian Premier League: 2023–24, 2025–26
- Bosnian Cup runner-up: 2023–24

Individual

- Bosnian Premier League Manager of the Season: 2015–16, 2025–26

== See also ==
- List of Red Star Belgrade footballers
