= Ivica Kalinić =

Croatian footballer and manager

Personal information
- Full name: Ivica Kalinić
- Date of birth: 26 March 1956 (age 70)
- Place of birth: Split, FPR Yugoslavia
- Position: Defender

Youth career
- Solin

Senior career*
Years	Team	Apps	(Gls)
1976–1977	Hajduk Split	11	(1)
1980–1981	Maribor	29	(3)
1981–1985	Osijek	125	(6)
1985	Hajduk Split	11	(1)
1986–1989	Tirol Innsbruck	70	(7)
1989–1990	Grazer AK	7	(0)
Total		253	(17)

Managerial career
- 1990–1993: Hajduk Split (youth)
- 1993–1995: Hajduk Split (assistant)
- 1995–1996: Istra
- 1995: United Arab Emirates (assistant)
- 1998–1999: Hajduk Split (assistant)
- 1999–2000: Hajduk Split (youth)
- 2000–2001: Posušje
- 2001: Hajduk Split (youth)
- 2001: Solin
- 2002: Imotski
- 2003: Metalurh Zaporizhya (assistant)
- 2003: Uskok
- 2004: Imotski
- 2004–2006: Mosor
- 2006–2007: Široki Brijeg
- 2007–2009: Šibenik
- 2009: Hajduk Split
- 2010–2012: Hajduk Split (director of football)
- * Club domestic league appearances and goals

Ivica Kalinić (born 26 March 1956) is a Croatian former professional football manager and player. He is currently the sporting director of the club NK Prugovo.

He has played for Hajduk Split, Maribor, Osijek, Tirol Innsbruck and Grazer AK in his club career.

Kalinić has managed Istra Pula, Posušje, Solin, Imotski, Uskok, Mosor, Široki Brijeg, Šibenik and Hajduk Split in his managerial career.

== Managerial career ==
Kalinić worked as an assistant to Ivan Katalinić at Hajduk Split and to Tomislav Ivić in the United Arab Emirates and he successfully managed Bosnian Premier League club Široki Brijeg for one season, winning the 2006−07 Bosnian Cup. After that, he became the new manager of Croatian First Football League club Šibenik, finishing in the 6th place in the 2008–09 Croatian First Football League season.

=== Hajduk Split ===
After Široki Brijeg and Šibenik, Kalinić landed the job as Hajduk Split manager after Ante Miše resigned, because of a defeat against Zadar in August 2009.

Kalinić managed only one game for Hajduk and that was the third round of the UEFA Europa League against Žilina on home ground. After Hajduk conceded a goal in the 76th minute of the game, they were losing 1–2 on aggregate. In the late minutes of the game, Kalinić suffered heart problems and was taken to the hospital. He was clinically dead for 20 seconds and reanimated twice.

After recovering, he retired from managing and became sporting director at Hajduk where he remained until his full retirement in 2012.

== Honours ==
=== Player ===
Hajduk Split

- Yugoslav Cup: 1976–77

Maribor

- Slovenian Republic Cup: 1980–81

=== Manager ===
Široki Brijeg

- Bosnian Cup: 2006−07
