= Marijan Budimir =

Croatian football manager (born 1980)

Personal information
- Date of birth: 19 October 1980 (age 46)
- Place of birth: Split, Croatia
- Height: 1.85 m (6 ft 1 in)
- Position: Defender

Team information
- Current team: Croatia U17 (manager)

Youth career
- –1999: Hajduk Split

Senior career*
Years	Team	Apps	(Gls)
1999–2001	Udinese	0	(0)
2001–2002	Trnje		
2002–2007	Publikum Celje	84	(7)
2007–2008	Vėtra	25	(1)
2008–2010	Inter Zaprešić	53	(1)
2010–2012	Karlovac	14	(0)
2012–2013	Orkan Dugi Rat	20	(0)
2014	Mladost Proložac	9	(2)

International career
1996	Croatia U17	2	(0)
1998–1999	Croatia U19	5	(2)

Managerial career
- 2019–2023: Hajduk Split (youth team coach)
- 2023-2024: Široki Brijeg
- 2024–: Croatia U17
- * Club domestic league appearances and goals

Marijan Budimir (born 19 October 1980) is a Croatian professional football manager and former player. He is currently in charge of the Croatia national under-17 team.

Budimir previously coached the Hajduk Split U19 side, who he led to the 2022–23 UEFA Youth League final, and the Bosnian Premier League club Široki Brijeg.

== Managerial statistics ==
As of match played 17 December 2023

Team	From	To	Record							
Team	From	To	G	W	D	L	GF	GA	GD	Win %
Široki Brijeg	16 June 2023	23 December 2023	19	7	4	8	17	23	−6	36.84
Total			19	7	4	8	17	23	−6	36.84
