= Marko Lozo =

Croatian footballer and manager

Personal information
- Date of birth: 12 July 1988 (age 38)
- Place of birth: Split, SFR Yugoslavia
- Position: Forward

Senior career*
| Years | Team | Apps | (Gls) |
| 2007 | Imotski | | |
| 2007–2008 | Šibenik | 3 | (0) |
| 2008 | Imotski | | |
| 2008–2013 | Rudeš | | |
| 2013 | Strmec Bedenica | | |
| 2013–2014 | SV Güssing | 14 | (9) |
| 2014–2016 | Rudeš | | |
| 2016 | Jarun | | |

Managerial career
- 2016–2017: Hajduk Split II
- 2016: Hajduk Split (caretaker)
- 2018: Rudeš
- 2021: Međimurje
- 2023–2023: Solin
- * Club domestic league appearances and goals

Marko Lozo (born 12 July 1988) is a Croatian football manager and former player.

== Playing career ==
=== Club ===
He had a spell with Austrian fourth tier-side SV Güssing.

== Coaching career ==
Lozo started as the head coach of Youth Academy of Hajduk Split. On 29 May 2015, when Damir Burić became a manager, Lozo became an assistant manager. Burić was sacked in June 2016 and new manager became Marijan Pušnik, but Lozo remained under the coaching staff. In December 2016, Pušnik was sacked and Lozo was named the caretaker manager, while Joan Carrillo did not become the manager. In 2017 he left Hajduk Split.

On 2 October 2018, he was named the new manager of Croatian First Football League club Rudeš. In December 2018, he was sacked by club after poor results. In March 2021, he was announced as Međimurje's new manager.
