= Denis Ćorić =

Bosnian football manager (born 1977)

Personal information
- Date of birth: 10 December 1977 (age 48)
- Place of birth: Mostar, Bosnia and Herzegovina
- Position: Centre-forward

Youth career
- Velež Mostar

Senior career*
| Years | Team | Apps | (Gls) |
| 2000–2005 | Široki Brijeg | | |
| 2005–2006 | Zrinjski Mostar | | |
| 2006–2007 | Brotnjo | | |
| 2007–2009 | Neretva | | |

Managerial career
- 2016–2017: Široki Brijeg (caretaker)
- 2019: Široki Brijeg
- 2020–2021: Posušje
- 2022–2023: GOŠK Gabela
- 2024: Posušje
- 2024–2025: Željezničar
- 2025–2026: Al-Faisaly
- * Club domestic league appearances and goals

Denis Ćorić (born 10 December 1977) is a Bosnian professional football manager and former player who was most recently the manager of Jordanian Pro League club Al-Faisaly.

== Playing career ==
Born in Mostar, Bosnia and Herzegovina, Ćorić started his youth career at hometown club Velež. He played at the senior level for Široki Brijeg, Zrinjski Mostar, Brotnjo and Neretva, finishing his career at the age of 32 following numerous problems with injuries.

== Managerial career ==
=== Široki Brijeg ===
Upon his retirement from playing, Ćorić started working as a coach in former club Široki Brijeg's youth ranks. He was appointed caretaker manager of the senior team in October 2016, getting replaced by Goran Sablić in January 2017. After Macedonian manager Goce Sedloski's resignation, Ćorić was appointed manager on a permanent basis on 27 July 2019. His first match back in charge was a 2–2 away draw with Sloboda Tuzla on the same day of his appointment. On 15 September 2019, Ćorić resigned as manager following a five game winless run, culminating with a 3–1 home defeat to Tuzla City.

=== Posušje ===
On 12 June 2020, Ćorić was appointed manager of newly promoted First League of FBiH club Posušje. His debut was a 1–0 away win over TOŠK Tešanj on 9 August 2020. Ćorić managed to finish the season with Posušje in first place, earning promotion to the Bosnian Premier League. On 12 September 2021, he resigned after the team won only one of their eight opening games in the Premier League.

=== GOŠK Gabela ===
On 4 May 2022, Ćorić was announced as the new manager at GOŠK Gabela. He finished the 2021–22 First League of FBiH season with GOŠK in second place, two points short of winning the title and earning promotion. Off the back of that disappointment, Ćorić led GOŠK to the First League of FBiH title, his second overall, in the following season and promoted the club back to the Bosnian Premier League.

GOŠK opened the 2023–24 Premier League season with a 4–1 home defeat to Tuzla City on 30 July 2023. They recorded their first league win over Zvijezda 09 on 12 August 2023. Following a series of poor results, Ćorić left GOŠK by mutual consent on 6 November 2023.

=== Return to Posušje ===
On 2 January 2024, Ćorić was appointed manager of Posušje for the second time. His first competitive game back in charge of the club was a 2–0 win against Laktaši in the Bosnian Cup second round on 10 February 2024. He guided Posušje to a nine game unbeaten run in the league, before losing to Borac Banja Luka on 24 April 2024. Ćorić finished the season with Posušje in fifth place, the club's highest ever finish in the Bosnian Premier League. On 24 May 2024, he was given the Bosnian Premier League Manager of the Season award for the 2023–24 season.

Ćorić left the club by mutual consent on 6 June 2024, amidst interests from Željezničar.

=== Željezničar ===
On 12 June 2024, Ćorić signed a one-year deal to become Željezničar manager, with the option of extending for a further year. In his first competitive game in charge, on 3 August 2024, his side lost to his former club Široki Brijeg 1–0 in the league. He recorded his first win as Željezničar manager on 10 August, defeating Velež Mostar 2–1 away.

Following elimination from the Bosnian Cup semi-finals by Široki Brijeg, Ćorić's side suffered a 5–0 defeat against Zrinjski Mostar on 19 April 2025. This was Željezničar's biggest ever Bosnian Premier League defeat in history. Ćorić subsequently offered his resignation as manager, but that was rejected by the club's board.

Despite securing Željezničar a place in the 2025–26 UEFA Conference League qualifiers, Ćorić was sacked as manager by the club on 19 May 2025, having suffered a defeat the previous day against Široki Brijeg.

== Managerial statistics ==
As of match played 2 February 2026

Managerial record by team and tenure
| Team | From | To | Record | | | | | | | |
| Team | From | To | G | W | D | L | GF | GA | GD | Win % |
|---|---|---|---|---|---|---|---|---|---|---|
| Široki Brijeg (caretaker) | 3 October 2016 | 16 January 2017 | 9 | 5 | 1 | 3 | 7 | 4 | +3 | 55.56 |
| Široki Brijeg | 27 July 2019 | 15 September 2019 | 7 | 1 | 4 | 2 | 9 | 9 | +0 | 14.29 |
| Posušje | 12 June 2020 | 12 September 2021 | 38 | 19 | 9 | 10 | 53 | 29 | +24 | 50.00 |
| GOŠK Gabela | 4 May 2022 | 6 November 2023 | 50 | 28 | 12 | 10 | 96 | 56 | +40 | 56.00 |
| Posušje | 2 January 2024 | 6 June 2024 | 18 | 10 | 4 | 4 | 20 | 13 | +7 | 55.56 |
| Željezničar | 12 June 2024 | 19 May 2025 | 37 | 23 | 5 | 9 | 72 | 41 | +31 | 62.16 |
| Al-Faisaly | 18 August 2025 | 3 February 2026 | 9 | 6 | 3 | 0 | 24 | 10 | +14 | 66.67 |
| Total | | | 168 | 92 | 38 | 38 | 281 | 162 | +119 | 54.76 |

== Honours ==
=== Player ===
Široki Brijeg

- Bosnian Premier League: 2003–04

=== Manager ===
Posušje

- First League of FBiH: 2020–21

GOŠK Gabela

- First League of FBiH: 2022–23

Al-Faisaly

- Jordan Shield Cup: 2025

Individual

- Bosnian Premier League Manager of the Season: 2023–24
