= Dean Klafurić =

Croatian football manager (born 1972)

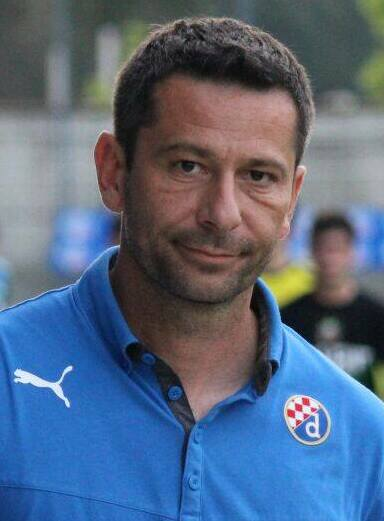
- Klafurić with Dinamo Zagreb in 2015

Personal information
- Date of birth: 26 July 1972 (age 54)
- Place of birth: Zagreb, SFR Yugoslavia

Managerial career
- Years: Team
- 2009–2012: Croatia Women
- 2012–2015: Dinamo Zagreb (youth)
- 2017: Gorica
- 2018: Legia Warsaw
- 2019: Hrvatski Dragovoljac
- 2020: Ethnikos Achna
- 2021: Slaven Belupo
- 2022–2023: Budapest Honvéd
- 2023–2024: Velež Mostar
- 2024: TSC
- 2024–2026: Široki Brijeg
- 2026–: Tirana

Dean Klafurić (born 26 July 1972) is a Croatian professional football manager. Apart from Croatia, he has also managed clubs in Poland, Cyprus, Hungary, Bosnia and Herzegovina, and Serbia.

== Managerial career ==
=== Early career ===
Klafurić started working as a football manager in Udarnik in 2005. He accepted the place of manager of the Croatia women's national team in 2009. In 2012, Klafurić was sacked as manager. He then started working in the Dinamo Zagreb Academy.

On 16 April 2018, Klafurić took over the caretaker manager role at Polish club Legia Warsaw after compatriot Romeo Jozak got fired. Klafurić would go on to win the domestic cup and a domestic league title double. On 4 June 2018, he was appointed as the manager of Legia Warsaw, before getting sacked on 1 August 2018.

Klafurić later worked as manager of Hrvatski Dragovoljac, Cypriot side Ethnikos Achna and Slaven Belupo.

=== Budapest Honvéd ===
On 24 October 2022, Klafurić was appointed manager of Nemzeti Bajnokság I club Budapest Honvéd. He managed his first Budapest Honvéd match against Fehérvár, losing 1–0 at the Bozsik Aréna on 29 October 2022.

=== Velež Mostar ===
On 30 August 2023, Bosnian Premier League side Velež Mostar appointed Klafurić as manager on a two-year deal. His first match in charge was a 4–2 away win against Igman Konjic on 16 September 2023.

Klafurić suffered his first defeat as Velež manager against Borac Banja Luka on 1 October 2023. In his first ever Mostar derby, Klafurić's side were defeated by Zrinjski on 18 October 2023. He led the club to a 3–0 home win against Zrinjski on 13 November 2023, Velež's first derby win in three years. He finished the season with Velež in third place, qualifying for the 2024–25 UEFA Conference League first qualifying round.

On 17 June 2024, it was announced by Velež that Klafurić had surprisingly left the club by mutual consent.

=== TSC ===
On 1 July 2024, Klafurić was announced as manager of Serbian SuperLiga club TSC. The club had qualified for the UEFA Europa League play-off by finishing third in the national league in the previous season.

TSC was drawn to play against Maccabi Tel Aviv in the play-off in August, and went on to lose 8–1 on aggregate, to drop down to the 2024–25 UEFA Conference League. However, following a string of poor results, which saw him win only two games in the opening five league matches of the season, Klafurić resigned on 30 August 2024.

=== Široki Brijeg ===
Klafurić returned to the Bosnian Premier League in December 2024, having been revealed as manager of Široki Brijeg on 20 December. His first match in charge was a 1–0 home win against GOŠK Gabela in a Bosnian Cup game on 8 February 2025. He guided the side to the Bosnian cup final in May 2025, but was defeated by Sarajevo 5–1 on aggregate.

On 6 January 2026, Klafurić left Široki Brijeg by mutual consent, amidst growing speculation about changes in the club's management.

== Managerial statistics ==
As of match played 13 December 2025

Managerial record by team and tenure
Team	From	To	Record				
Team	From	To	G	W	D	L	Win %
Gorica	1 July 2017	12 September 2017	6	5	0	1	83.33
Legia Warsaw	16 April 2018	1 August 2018	15	11	1	3	73.33
Ethnikos Achna	1 January 2020	27 October 2020	22	7	3	12	31.82
Slaven Belupo	1 July 2021	27 August 2021	7	1	2	4	14.29
Budapest Honvéd	24 October 2022	28 May 2023	22	5	5	12	22.73
Velež Mostar	30 August 2023	17 June 2024	32	16	9	7	50.00
TSC	29 June 2024	30 August 2024	7	2	1	4	28.57
Široki Brijeg	20 December 2024	6 January 2026	43	17	12	14	39.53
Tirana	20 June 2026		11	4	3	4	36.36
Total			154	64	33	57	41.56

== Honours ==
Legia Warsaw

- Ekstraklasa: 2017–18
- Polish Cup: 2017–18

Široki Brijeg

- Bosnian Cup runner-up: 2024–25

Individual

- Ekstraklasa Coach of the Month: May 2018
