= Dino Skender =

Croatian football manager (born 1983)

Personal information
- Date of birth: 10 December 1983 (age 42)
- Place of birth: Osijek, SR Croatia, SFR Yugoslavia

Team information
- Current team: Liepāja (manager)

Managerial career
- Years: Team
- 2017–2019: Osijek II
- 2019: Osijek
- 2020–2021: Olimpija Ljubljana
- 2021–2022: Olimpija Ljubljana
- 2023–2024: Široki Brijeg
- 2025–: Liepāja

Dino Skender (born 10 December 1983) is a Croatian professional football manager who is the manager of Latvian club Liepāja. Besides Croatia, he has also managed in Slovenia and Bosnia and Herzegovina.

== Managerial career ==
Skender started his managerial career at the age of 33, as manager of the second team of Osijek in the Croatian Third League. On 30 March 2019, following the departure of Zoran Zekić, he was appointed manager of the first team. Skender was sacked by Osijek on 21 September 2019.

On 19 June 2020, Skender became manager of Slovenian PrvaLiga side Olimpija Ljubljana. After finishing second in the first part of the 2020–21 season, he was sacked on 8 January 2021 along with all of his staff members. He was again appointed as manager of Olimpija on 12 October 2021, replacing Savo Milošević. However, on 20 March 2022, he was sacked again without finishing the season, after a 1–1 home draw against Domžale.

On 30 December 2023, Skender was announced as the new manager of Bosnian Premier League club Široki Brijeg. He debuted as manager in the Bosnian Cup second round on 11 February 2024, qualifying to the quarter-finals after a penalty shoot-out, following a 2–2 draw against Stupčanica Olovo. Following two more league victories against Sarajevo and Željezničar, Skender suffered his first defeat as Široki Brijeg manager on 2 March 2024, losing 1–0 away from home to Igman Konjic. He led the side to the cup semi-finals, where they were knocked out 5–2 on aggregate by Borac Banja Luka. On 12 May 2024, it was announced by Široki Brijeg that Skender had left the club by mutual consent, after the team's disappointing league campaign.

== Managerial statistics ==
As of match played 11 May 2024

Managerial record by team and tenure
Team	From	To	Record				
Team	From	To	P	W	D	L	Win %
Osijek II	19 January 2017	29 March 2019	62	37	10	15	59.68
Osijek	30 March 2019	21 September 2019	22	10	5	7	45.45
Olimpija Ljubljana	19 June 2020	8 January 2021	30	15	8	7	50.00
Olimpija Ljubljana	12 October 2021	20 March 2022	17	7	5	5	41.18
Široki Brijeg	30 December 2023	12 May 2024	18	7	1	10	38.89
Total			149	76	29	44	51.01

== Honours ==
Osijek II

- Croatian Third League – East: 2017–18
