= Branko Karačić =

Croatian football manager (born 1960)

Personal information
- Date of birth: 24 September 1960 (age 66)
- Place of birth: Vinkovci, FPR Yugoslavia
- Position: Attacking midfielder

Youth career
- Bedem Ivankovo
- 1979–1981: Mladost Vođinci

Senior career*
Years	Team	Apps	(Gls)
1981–1987	Osijek	127	(37)
1987–1989	Hajduk Split	40	(10)
1989–1993	Cercle Brugge	121	(44)
1994–1995	Gent	30	(9)
1995–1996	Linz		
1996–1997	Saint-Gilloise		
Total		318	(100)

Managerial career
- 2000–2001: NK Zagreb
- 2002–2003: Marsonia
- 2003–2004: Osijek
- 2004–2005: Slaven Belupo
- 2005–2006: Cibalia
- 2007–2009: Slavonac CO
- 2009–2010: Šibenik
- 2010–2011: Osijek
- 2011–2012: Široki Brijeg
- 2013–2014: Zrinjski Mostar
- 2015–2016: Vitez
- 2016: Široki Brijeg
- 2017–2018: Vitez
- 2018–2019: Varaždin
- 2021: Sesvete
- 2023: Posušje
- 2024: Vukovar 1991
- 2024–2025: Posušje
- * Club domestic league appearances and goals

Branko Karačić (born 24 September 1960) is a Croatian professional football manager and former player.

== Club career ==
Karačić turned professional in 1981 and spent the following six years with Osijek, where he appeared in a total of 300 matches for the club. He became captain of the team in his last years at Osijek and played alongside Davor Šuker, the world class striker from the Croatia national team and later Real Madrid, currently president of the Croatian Football Federation.

He then moved to Croatian powerhouse Hajduk Split, for whom he played between 1987 and 1989, alongside many Croatia national team players – Alen Bokšić, Aljoša Asanović, Igor Štimac and Robert Jarni. After which, he decided to move abroad and play for Cercle Brugge (1989–1993).

There he was a part of the Croatian trio – Jerko Tipurić, Josip Weber and he. They were the star players in the late 1990s and made a historic impact. Karačić was elected in the top 11 in the history of Cercle Brugge.

In 1993, he moved to Gent where he played for 2 years after which he moved to Austria to play for FC Linz where Zlatko Kranjčar was the head coach and the famous Hugo Sanchez played as a forward.

His last club was Saint-Gilloise (1996–1997) from the 2nd league in Belgium where he played for half and a year, and then finished his career as a professional footballer.

== International career ==
During his playing career, Karačić was feared for his passing and free kick abilities and was known for having excellent technique and first touch. He had an amazing oversight of the game and was the definition of a classic playmaker. He also made an appearance for the Olympic team of Yugoslavia while he was playing at Osijek.

== Managerial career ==
After retiring from active football he first held the post of director of football at Osijek (1997–1998) and then, after gaining his coaching diploma – UEFA PRO, went on to coach a number of Prva HNL clubs.

His first coaching job was assisting Ivo Šušak at NK Zagreb (1999–2000), before taking over himself in the 2000–01 season.

In his first season as the head coach, he managed to finish on the 4th place and reached semi-final of the Croatian Cup. He then went on to coach Marsonia, with which he earned a promotion to the Prva HNL.

He took over Osijek in 2003, his first club as a professional football player, finishing again on the 4th place in the competition and reaching the quarter-finals of the Croatian Cup. In 2010 he once again became the coach of Osijek.

After accepting an offer from Slaven Belupo in 2004, he managed to finish on the 6th place and qualified for the Intertoto Cup where the club played against Deportivo La Coruña. This was the first international appearance in his career as the coach.

During the 2005–06 he managed the team of Cibalia finishing on the 9th place in Prva HNL.

After a 1-year absence of coaching, he accepted the project Slavonac CO, which he managed from 2007 to 2009. With the club he made a historic result qualifying for the Prva HNL, although they have never played in it due to financial reasons.

When he took over Šibenik in the 2009–10 season, he managed to put down the best result in the club's history finishing on the 4th place in domestic competition and playing the final of the Croatian Cup against Hajduk Split. They qualified for the UEFA Europa League, where they successfully passed the 1st round of qualifications. They then played against Cyprian powerhouse Anorthosis Famagusta FC.

In 2011, Karačić became the manager of Široki Brijeg in the Bosnian Premier League. There, he also reached the final of the Bosnian Cup and finished as runner-ups in the competition. In the 2013–14 season, he achieved his best result yet as a manager, when he won Bosnian Premier League with Zrinjski Mostar, although they were considered underdogs throughout the whole season. They earned the right to play in the UEFA Champions League where they played against Maribor. In December 2014, Karačić was sacked.

During the 2015–16 season, Karačić managed Vitez, and during late 2016 he managed Široki Brijeg.

In October 2018, Karačić became the new manager of Varaždin. On 18 May 2019, he got Varaždin promoted to the Prva HNL after the club beat Šibenik 3–1 at home. In June 2019, Karačić left the club. He left Sesvete in December 2021 after leading them in only 12 matches.

On 23 March 2023, Karačić returned to the Bosnian Premier League, becoming the new manager of Posušje. He finished the season with the side in 10th place, managing to avoid relegation. Following the end of the season, Karačić extended his contract with Posušje until June 2024. He was sacked as manager by the club on 30 December 2023.

== Style of managing ==
Karačić in his managerial role has been described as someone whose management style is focused on tactical organization, disciplined teams, and offensive approach. Notable among these traits is his inclusion of youth players in senior teams such as - Ognjen Vukojević, Danijel Pranjić, Arijan Ademi, Ermin Zec, Marko Babić and Antonio Franja.

== Honours ==
=== Manager ===
Marsonia

- Druga HNL - North: 2002–03

Zrinjski Mostar

- Bosnian Premier League: 2013–14

Varaždin

- Druga HNL: 2018–19
