= Toni Karačić =

Bosnian and Herzegovnian football manager (born 1974)

Personal information
- Date of birth: 6 December 1974 (age 51)
- Place of birth: Široki Brijeg, SFR Yugoslavia

Managerial career
- Years: Team
- 2009–2010: Široki Brijeg
- 2011–2018: Bosnia and Herzegovina U19
- 2019–2021: Široki Brijeg
- 2022: Posušje
- 2023: Zvijezda 09
- 2023–2024: GOŠK Gabela
- 2024: Široki Brijeg

Toni Karačić (born 6 December 1974) is a Bosnian and Herzegovnian professional football manager. He was most recently manager of Bosnian and Herzegovnian Premier League club Široki Brijeg.

== Managerial statistics ==
As of match played 23 November 2024

Managerial record by team and tenure
Team	From	To	Record							
Team	From	To	G	W	D	L	GF	GA	GD	Win %
Široki Brijeg	30 August 2009	26 May 2010	26	15	6	5	43	23	+20	57.69
Bosnia and Herzegovina U19	1 July 2011	26 April 2018	68	27	16	25	119	97	+22	39.71
Široki Brijeg	15 September 2019	5 August 2021	58	30	15	13	84	59	+25	51.72
Posušje	23 March 2022	5 June 2022	10	4	5	1	15	11	+4	40.00
Zvijezda 09	22 February 2023	15 June 2023	17	10	5	2	41	14	+27	58.82
GOŠK Gabela	8 November 2023	12 February 2024	6	2	1	3	4	9	−5	33.33
Široki Brijeg	3 June 2024	27 November 2024	15	5	4	6	27	23	+4	33.33
Total			200	93	52	55	333	236	+97	46.50
