= HŠK Posušje =

Association football club in Bosnia and Herzegovina

Posušje
- Full name: Hrvatski športski klub Posušje
- Founded: 13 August 1950; 75 years ago
- Ground: Mokri Dolac Stadium, Posušje
- Capacity: 5,040
- Chairman: Ivan Petric
- Manager: Borislav Grbavac
- League: First League of FBiH
- 2025–26: Premier League BH, 9th of 10 (relegated)
- Website: https://www.hsk-posusje.com
Home colours	Away colours

HŠK Posušje (Croatian: Hrvatski športski klub Posušje, lit. 'Croat Sports Club Posušje') is a professional association football club based in Posušje that is situated in Bosnia and Herzegovina. The club is best known for winning the First League of Herzeg-Bosnia in 1999 and 2000, the top flight ethnic Croat league in Bosnia and Herzegovina at the time.

Currently, Posušje competes in the First League of the Federation of Bosnia and Herzegovina, the second level of football in the country, and plays its home matches at the Mokri Dolac Stadium, which has a capacity of 5,040 seats. The club was promoted to the Bosnian Premier League in 2021, before being relegated in 2026.

Previously, Posušje won the southern group of the Second League of FBiH in the 2017–18 season, going 12 rounds undefeated to start the season. However, the club did not gain promotion after losing to Goražde in the play-offs.

Previous names of the club have included NK Zidar (from 1950) and NK Boksit (from 1963), with the current name being adopted in the early 1990s. Posušje's fans are now known as the Poskoci (Horned Vipers), but were previously known as Torcida. The stadium's name, "Mokri Dolac", means 'Wet Valley'.

== Honours ==
=== Domestic ===
==== League ====
- First League of the Federation of Bosnia and Herzegovina
  - Winners (1): 2020–21
- Second League of the Federation of Bosnia and Herzegovina:
  - Winners (2): 2017–18 (south), 2019–20 (south)
- First League of Herzeg-Bosnia:
  - Winners (2): 1998–99, 1999–2000

==== Cups ====
- Bosnia and Herzegovina Cup:
  - Semi-finalists (2): 2000–01, 2007–08

== Players ==
=== Current squad ===
As of 28 February 2025

Note: Flags indicate national team as defined under FIFA eligibility rules; some limited exceptions apply. Players may hold more than one non-FIFA nationality.

No.	Pos.	Nation	Player
1	GK	BIH	Antonio Soldo
3	DF	BIH	Tarik Kapetanović (on loan from Sarajevo)
4	FW	CRO	Branko Ćurdo
5	DF	SRB	Dejan Kerkez
6	MF	CRO	Mateo Andačić
7	FW	CRO	Leon Kreković
8	MF	CRO	Martin Šroler
9	FW	CRO	Vinko Petković
11	FW	BIH	David Čamber
16	FW	BIH	Borna Filipović (on loan from Zrinjski Mostar)
18	MF	CRO	Mario Čuić
19	MF	CRO	Marko Domančić
20	DF	BIH	Josip Bešlić
21	MF	CRO	Ivan Posavec (on loan from Zrinjski Mostar)

No.	Pos.	Nation	Player
22	MF	BIH	Zvonimir Begić (captain)
23	MF	CRO	Denis Bušnja
25	MF	SUI	David Mištrafović
27	MF	CRO	Marko Hanuljak
29	MF	CRO	Ante Rozić
30	DF	BIH	Mate Lasić
31	GK	CRO	Zvonimir Šubarić (on loan from Lokomotiva Zagreb)
32	FW	CRO	Ante Živković
33	DF	CRO	Ivan Novoselec
44	DF	CRO	Filip Milović
70	DF	CRO	Valentino Majstorović
77	MF	CRO	Ivan Kukavica
90	FW	COL	José Mulato (on loan from Spartak Subotica)
97	MF	CRO	Niko Miočić

=== Other players under contract ===
Note: Flags indicate national team as defined under FIFA eligibility rules; some limited exceptions apply. Players may hold more than one non-FIFA nationality.

No.	Pos.	Nation	Player
—	DF	ARG	Franco Abrego

=== Out on loan ===
Note: Flags indicate national team as defined under FIFA eligibility rules; some limited exceptions apply. Players may hold more than one non-FIFA nationality.

No.	Pos.	Nation	Player
—	MF	BIH	Stipan Križanac (at Tomislav until 30 June 2026)

== Managerial history ==
- (Croatia) Albert Pobor
- (Croatia) Stjepan Čordaš
- (Croatia) Stanko Mršić (1999)
- (Croatia) Vjeran Simunić (2000)
- (Croatia) Ivica Kalinić (2000–2001)
- (Bosnia and Herzegovina) Mario Ćutuk (1 July 2002 – 30 June 2004)
- (Bosnia and Herzegovina) Dragan Jović (4 September 2006 – 7 October 2007)
- (Croatia) Ivan Katalinić (1 June 2008 – 31 December 2008)
- (Bosnia and Herzegovina) Boris Gavran (24 June 2008 – 10 March 2009)
- (Croatia) Darko Dražić (19 March 2009 – 11 May 2009)
- (Bosnia and Herzegovina) Mario Knezović (1 June 2015 – 21 September 2015)
- (Bosnia and Herzegovina) Damir Ramljak (14 October 2015 – 1 February 2016)
- (Bosnia and Herzegovina) Leo Slišković (4 February 2016 – 1 June 2020)
- (Bosnia and Herzegovina) Denis Ćorić (12 June 2020 – 12 September 2021)
- (Croatia) Stipe Balajić (16 September 2021 – 22 March 2022)
- (Bosnia and Herzegovina) Toni Karačić (23 March 2022 – 5 June 2022)
- (Croatia) Ferdo Milin (14 June 2022 – 19 September 2022)
- (Croatia) Goran Granić (29 September 2022 – 22 March 2023)
- (Croatia) Branko Karačić (23 March 2023 – 30 December 2023)
- (Bosnia and Herzegovina) Denis Ćorić (2 January 2024 – 6 June 2024)
- (Bosnia and Herzegovina) Duško Vranešević (17 June 2024 – 28 October 2024)
- (Croatia) Branko Karačić (30 December 2024 – 10 March 2025)
- (Bosnia and Herzegovina) Marko Maksimović (13 March 2025 – 29 September 2025)
- (Croatia) Dario Bašić (7 October 2025 – 18 June 2026)
- (Bosnia and Herzegovina) Borislav Grbavac (27 June 2026 – present)
