= 2025–26 FK Željezničar season =

Željezničar
2025–26 season
- Chairman: Admir Tunović (until 29 December); Nijaz Brković (from 29 December until 9 March); Sanin Mirvić (from 24 May)
- Manager: Admir Adžem (until 7 December); Slaviša Stojanović (from 29 December until 22 February); Savo Milošević (from 3 March until 14 May); Adin Mulaosmanović (caretaker, from 14 May)
- Stadium: Grbavica Stadium
- Premier League BiH: 6th
- Kup BiH: Quarter-finals
- UEFA Conference League: First qualifying round
- Top goalscorer: League: Hamza Jaganjac; Vini Peixoto (4 each); All: Enes Alić (6)
- Highest home attendance: 12,847 vs Koper (10 July 2025)
- Lowest home attendance: 1,000 vs Sloga (25 February 2026)
- Average home league attendance: 6,723

The 2025–26 season was Željezničar's 105th in existence and their 26th season in the Bosnian Premier League. Besides competing in the domestic league, the team also competed in the National Cup. Željezničar competed in the qualifications for the UEFA Conference League as well.

== Season review ==
=== June ===
On 2 June, Željezničar announced the transfer of Abdulmalik Al-Jaber to Al-Nassr for an undisclosed transfer fee.

On 9 June, Željezničar announced the signing of 25-year-old Enes Alić.

On 11 June, Željezničar announced the loan of 21-year-old Hamza Jaganjac from Istra 1961 for the duration of the season.

On 12 June, Željezničar announced the signing of 18-year-old Olanrewaju Ibraheem.

On 13 June, Željezničar announced the departure of Azur Mahmić. The club also announced the signing of 23-year-old Josip Pejić.

On 16 June, Željezničar announced the departures of Marin Galić and Filip Dangubić. The club also announced the signing of 27-year-old João Erick.

On 18 June, Željezničar announced the signing of 17-year-old Admir Gojak.

On 19 June, Željezničar announced the departure of sporting director Elvir Rahimić.

On 20 June, Željezničar announced the departure of Huso Karjašević. The club also announced the signings of 27-year-old Giovanni Troupée and 23-year-old Edin Osmanović.

On 25 June, Željezničar announced the signing of 30-year-old Collin Seedorf.

On 30 June, Željezničar announced the departure of Ognjen Laušević.

=== July ===
On 4 July, Željezničar announced the signing of 23-year-old Ognjen Obradov.

On 19 July, Željezničar announced the signing of 21-year-old Davor Rakić.

On 21 July, Željezničar announced the signing of 27-year-old Joey Konings.

On 30 July, Željezničar announced the signing of 18-year-old Alvin Ćosić.

=== September ===
On 3 September, Željezničar announced the signing of 30-year-old Deni Milošević.

On 4 September, Željezničar announced the signings of 17-year-old Jonathan Freeman and 20-year-old Santiago Garcia.

On 8 September, Željezničar announced the signing of 20-year-old Arman Šutković.

=== October ===
On 15 October, Željezničar negotiated a one-year contract extension with Matej Cvetanoski, until July 2027.

On 23 October, Željezničar announced the signing of 20-year-old Ismail Oulad M'Hand.

=== December ===
On 7 December, Željezničar announced the departure of manager Admir Adžem.

On 26 December, Sanin Mirvić was announced as the strategic partner of Željezničar.

On 29 December, Nijaz Brković was announced as the new chairman of the board of Željezničar. The club also announced Slaviša Stojanović as its new manager.

=== January ===
On 11 January, Željezničar announced the departure of Dan Lagumdžija.

On 13 January, Željezničar announced the transfer of Aleksandar Boljević to Sogdiana for an undisclosed transfer fee, and the departure of Arman Šutković.

On 17 January, Željezničar announced the signing of 28-year-old Dominik Prokop.

On 18 January, Željezničar announced the signing of 31-year-old Bojan Nastić.

On 29 January, Željezničar announced the signing of 26-year-old Aleksa Pejić.

=== February ===
On 3 February, Željezničar announced the signing of 22-year-old Muharem Husković.

On 6 February, Željezničar announced the transfer of Marin Karamarko to Wisła Płock for an undisclosed transfer fee, and the departures of Ognjen Obradov and Malik Kolić.

On 7 February, Željezničar announced the departure of Josip Pejić.

On 10 February, Željezničar announced the departure of Léo Simoni.

On 12 February, Željezničar announced the signings of 36-year-old Ermin Bičakčić, and 24-year-old Patrik-Gabriel Galchev.

On 16 February, Željezničar announced the signing of 25-year-old Armin Hodžić.

On 22 February, Željezničar announced the departure of manager Slaviša Stojanović.

On 28 February, Željezničar announced Savo Milošević as its new manager. He took charge of the squad on 3 March.

=== March ===
On 9 March, Željezničar announced that its chairman of the board, Nijaz Brković, was dismissed of his duties.

=== May ===
On 14 May, Željezničar announced the departure of manager Savo Milošević.

On 24 May, Sanin Mirvić was announced as the club's new chairman of the board.

== First-team squad ==
N	Pos.	Nat.	Name	Age	EU	Since	App	Goals	Ends	Transfer fee	Notes
Goalkeepers
1	GK	(Bosnia and Herzegovina)	Tarik Abdulahović	28	Non-EU	2024	9	0	2026	Free	Originally from youth system
12	GK	(Bosnia and Herzegovina)	Alvin Ćosić	19	Non-EU	2025	0	0	2027	Free	
13	GK	(Bosnia and Herzegovina)	Vedad Muftić	24	Non-EU	2020	131	0	2026	Youth system	Originally from youth system
Defenders
2	DF	(Nigeria)	Edwin Odinaka	22	Non-EU	2024	62	3	2026	Free	
3	DF	(Bosnia and Herzegovina)	Enes Alić	27	Non-EU	2025	39	6	2027	Free	
4	DF	(Bosnia and Herzegovina)	Ermin Bičakčić	36	Non-EU	2026	16	1	2026	Free	
15	DF	(Bosnia and Herzegovina)	Bojan Nastić	32	Non-EU	2026	9	0	2028	Free	
19	DF	(Bosnia and Herzegovina)	Mustafa Šukilović	23	Non-EU	2024	37	2	2026	Free	
20	DF	(Curaçao)	Giovanni Troupée	28	EU	2025	14	0	2027	Free	
26	DF	(Bulgaria)	Patrik-Gabriel Galchev	25	EU	2026	14	0	2027	Free	
33	DF	(Netherlands)	Collin Seedorf	31	EU	2025	35	3	2027	Free	
61	DF	(Bosnia and Herzegovina)	Ajdin Raščić	18	Non-EU	2026	4	0	2029	Youth system	Originally from youth system
90	DF	(Luxembourg)	Edin Osmanović	25	EU	2025	6	0	2027	Free	
Midfielders
5	MF	(Bosnia and Herzegovina)	Afan Fočo	18	Non-EU	2024	21	0	2026	Youth system	Originally from youth system
6	MF	(Serbia)	Aleksa Pejić	27	Non-EU	2026	17	0	2028	Free	
8	MF	(Austria)	Dominik Prokop	29	EU	2026	15	3	2028	Undisclosed	
10	MF	(Bosnia and Herzegovina)	Madžid Šošić (captain)	24	Non-EU	2025	32	11	2027	Free	Originally from youth system
11	MF	(Brazil)	Vini Peixoto	25	Non-EU	2025	47	5	2026	Free	
14	MF	(North Macedonia)	Matej Cvetanoski	29	Non-EU	2024	61	10	2027	Free	
16	MF	(Bosnia and Herzegovina)	Dženan Šabić	20	Non-EU	2022	58	2	2028	Youth system	Originally from youth system
17	MF	(Nigeria)	Olanrewaju Ibraheem	20	Non-EU	2025	0	0	2027	Free	
18	MF	(Brazil)	João Erick	28	Non-EU	2025	33	2	2026	Free	
22	MF	(Bosnia and Herzegovina)	Admir Gojak	19	Non-EU	2025	6	0	2027	Youth system	Originally from youth system
23	MF	(Bosnia and Herzegovina)	Eldar Dragović	18	Non-EU	2026	12	1	2030	Youth system	Originally from youth system
27	MF	(Bosnia and Herzegovina)	Deni Milošević	31	Non-EU	2025	33	0	2027	Free	
28	MF	(Liberia)	Jonathan Freeman	19	Non-EU	2025	2	0	2026	Free	
34	MF	(Morocco)	Ismail Oulad M'Hand	21	Non-EU	2025	7	0	2027	Free	
55	MF	(Bosnia and Herzegovina)	Armin Hodžić	26	Non-EU	2026	48	8	2028	Free	
88	MF	(Bosnia and Herzegovina)	Samir Radovac	30	Non-EU	2024	55	1	2027	Free	
Forwards
7	FW	(Bosnia and Herzegovina)	Sulejman Krpić	35	Non-EU	2023	165	59	2026	Free	
9	FW	(Bosnia and Herzegovina)	Hamza Jaganjac	22	Non-EU	2025	32	5	2026	Free	On loan from Istra 1961
21	FW	(Netherlands)	Joey Konings	28	EU	2025	11	0	2027	Free	
29	FW	(Austria)	Muharem Husković	23	EU	2026	7	0	2028	Free	
31	FW	(Bosnia and Herzegovina)	Aldian Korora	17	Non-EU	2025	3	0	2028	Free	
60	FW	(United States)	Santiago Garcia	21	Non-EU	2025	0	0	2026	Free	
99	FW	(Serbia)	Davor Rakić	22	Non-EU	2025	19	0	2028	Free	

- Source: fkzeljeznicar.ba
- Ordered by squad number.

== Transfers ==
=== In ===
No.	Pos.	Player	Transferred from	Fee	Date	Source
3	DF	(Bosnia and Herzegovina) Enes Alić	(Croatia) Varaždin	Free transfer	9 June 2025	
17	MF	(Nigeria) Olanrewaju Ibraheem	Zvijezda 09	Free transfer	12 June 2025	
42	MF	(Croatia) Josip Pejić	(Croatia) Cibalia	Free transfer	13 June 2025	
18	MF	(Brazil) João Erick	Posušje	Free transfer	16 June 2025	
22	MF	(Bosnia and Herzegovina) Admir Gojak	(Germany) Türkgücü U19	Free transfer	18 June 2025	
20	DF	(Curaçao) Giovanni Troupée	(Netherlands) TOP Oss	Free transfer	20 June 2025	
90	DF	(Luxembourg) Edin Osmanović	(Luxembourg) Titus Pétange	Free transfer	20 June 2025	
33	DF	(Netherlands) Collin Seedorf	(Netherlands) Eindhoven	Free transfer	25 June 2025	
4	DF	(Serbia) Ognjen Obradov	Jedinstvo Bihać	Free transfer	4 July 2025	
99	FW	(Serbia) Davor Rakić	(Lithuania) Dainava	Free transfer	19 July 2025	
21	FW	(Netherlands) Joey Konings	(Netherlands) Eindhoven	Free transfer	21 July 2025	
12	GK	(Bosnia and Herzegovina) Alvin Ćosić	Igman Konjic	Free transfer	30 July 2025	
27	MF	(Bosnia and Herzegovina) Deni Milošević	(Turkey) Antalyaspor	Free transfer	3 September 2025	
67	MF	(Liberia) Jonathan Freeman	(Liberia) Discoveries SA	Free transfer	4 September 2025	
60	FW	(United States) Santiago Garcia	(Croatia) Vukovar U19	Free transfer	4 September 2025	
31	GK	(Bosnia and Herzegovina) Arman Šutković	Zrinjski Mostar	Free transfer	8 September 2025	
34	MF	(Morocco) Ismail Oulad M'Hand	(England) Arsenal U21	Free transfer	23 October 2025	
8	MF	(Austria) Dominik Prokop	(Austria) TSV Hartberg	Undisclosed	17 January 2026	
15	DF	(Bosnia and Herzegovina) Bojan Nastić	(Poland) Wisła Płock	Free transfer	18 January 2026	
6	MF	(Serbia) Aleksa Pejić	(Israel) Maccabi Bnei Reineh	Free transfer	29 January 2026	
29	FW	(Austria) Muharem Husković	Austria Wien	Free transfer	3 February 2026	
4	DF	(Bosnia and Herzegovina) Ermin Bičakčić	Free agent	Free transfer	12 February 2026	
26	DF	(Bulgaria) Patrik-Gabriel Galchev	Free agent	Free transfer	12 February 2026	
55	MF	(Bosnia and Herzegovina) Armin Hodžić	Free agent	Free transfer	16 February 2026	
Total				Undisclosed		

=== Out ===
No.	Pos.	Player	Transferred to	Fee	Date	Source
3	DF	(Montenegro) Stefan Radinović	(Lithuania) Hegelmann	End of contract	1 June 2025	
4	DF	(Montenegro) Nemanja Cavnić	(Kazakhstan) Tobol	End of contract	1 June 2025	
33	DF	(Bosnia and Herzegovina) Stipo Marković	Free agent	End of contract	1 June 2025	
70	MF	(North Macedonia) Martin Mirchevski	(North Macedonia) Sileks	End of contract	1 June 2025	
22	MF	(Saudi Arabia) Abdulmalik Al-Jaber	(Saudi Arabia) Al-Nassr	Undisclosed	2 June 2025	
44	DF	(Bosnia and Herzegovina) Azur Mahmić	Free agent	End of contract	13 June 2025	
9	FW	(Croatia) Filip Dangubić	(Kuwait) Al-Jahra	End of contract	16 June 2025	
24	DF	(Bosnia and Herzegovina) Marin Galić	(Montenegro) Budućnost Podgorica	End of contract	16 June 2025	
17	MF	(Bosnia and Herzegovina) Huso Karjašević	Velež Mostar	Contract termination	20 June 2025	
18	FW	(Serbia) Ognjen Laušević	(Serbia) Tekstilac Odžaci	Contract termination	30 June 2025	
8	MF	(Croatia) Dan Lagumdžija	Zrinjski Mostar	Contract termination	11 January 2026	
23	MF	(Montenegro) Aleksandar Boljević	(Uzbekistan) Sogdiana	Undisclosed	13 January 2026	
31	GK	(Bosnia and Herzegovina) Arman Šutković	Čelik Zenica	Contract termination	13 January 2026	
66	MF	(Bosnia and Herzegovina) Vedad Garčević	Stupčanica	Contract termination	20 January 2026	
4	DF	(Serbia) Ognjen Obradov	Jedinstvo Bihać	Contract termination	6 February 2026	
6	DF	(Croatia) Marin Karamarko	(Poland) Wisła Płock	Undisclosed	6 February 2026	
26	MF	(Bosnia and Herzegovina) Malik Kolić	Igman Konjic	Contract termination	6 February 2026	
42	MF	(Croatia) Josip Pejić	(Slovenia) Aluminij	Free transfer	7 February 2026	
44	DF	(Brazil) Léo Simoni	Free agent	Contract termination	10 February 2026	
Total				Undisclosed		

=== Loans in ===
No.	Pos.	Player	Loaned from	Fee	Date	On loan until	Source
9	FW	(Bosnia and Herzegovina) Hamza Jaganjac	(Croatia) Istra 1961	None	11 June 2025	30 June 2026	
Total				€0			

=== Loans out ===
No.	Pos.	Player	Loaned to	Fee	Date	On loan until	Source
44	DF	(Brazil) Léo Simoni	Croatia Zmijavci	None	2 August 2025	10 January 2026	
Total				€0			

== Coaching staff ==
Position	Name
Head coach	(Bosnia and Herzegovina) Adin Mulaosmanović (caretaker)
Goalkeeping coach	(Bosnia and Herzegovina) Kenan Hasagić
Fitness coach	(Slovenia) Matic Lukman Čoko
Video analyst	(Bosnia and Herzegovina) Emil Šabanović
Scout	(Bosnia and Herzegovina) Milan Gutović
Team manager	(Bosnia and Herzegovina) Aleksandar Kosorić
Doctors	(Bosnia and Herzegovina) Zlatko Dervišević
Doctors	(Bosnia and Herzegovina) Harun Đozić
Doctors	(Bosnia and Herzegovina) Mahir Moro
Physiotherapists	(Bosnia and Herzegovina) Raif Zeba
Physiotherapists	(Bosnia and Herzegovina) Adil Hubijar
Physiotherapists	(Bosnia and Herzegovina) Emir Kraljušić
Commissioner for Security	(Bosnia and Herzegovina) Erdijan Pekić

- Last updated: 14 May 2026
- Source: fkzeljeznicar.ba

== Competitions ==
=== Pre-season ===
28 June 2025 Friendly	Željezničar (Bosnia and Herzegovina)	1–1	(Bosnia and Herzegovina) Posušje	Ljubuški
17:30	Cvetanoski 43'	Report	Begić 57'	Stadium: Babovac Stadium

2 July 2025 Friendly	Zrinjski Mostar (Bosnia and Herzegovina)	0–2	(Bosnia and Herzegovina) Željezničar	Mostar
20:00		Report	Cvetanoski 56'; Šabić 90+4'	Stadium: Stadion pod Bijelim Brijegom

=== Mid-season ===
11 October 2025 Friendly	Željezničar (Bosnia and Herzegovina)	3–2	(Bosnia and Herzegovina) Široki Brijeg	Vukovar, Croatia
12:30	Konings 18'; Šošić 51', 78'	Report	Kpan 34'; Matić 55'	Stadium: Stadion Vukovar

20 January 2026 Friendly	Željezničar (Bosnia and Herzegovina)	1–0	(Serbia) Novi Pazar	Antalya, Turkey
15:00	Peixoto 80'	Report

25 January 2026 Friendly	Željezničar (Bosnia and Herzegovina)	3–0	(Slovakia) Zemplín Michalovce	Antalya, Turkey
15:00	Cvetanoski 7'; Peixoto 36'; Krpić 90+3'	Report

26 January 2026 Friendly	Željezničar (Bosnia and Herzegovina)	2–0	(North Macedonia) Sileks	Antalya, Turkey
13:00	Rakić 41'; Karamarko 90'	Report

31 January 2026 Friendly	Željezničar (Bosnia and Herzegovina)	0–1	(Ukraine) Cherkasy	Antalya, Turkey
14:00		Report	Bennette 52'

=== Overall ===
Competition	Started round	Final result	First match	Last Match
Premier League BiH	—N/a	6th	27 July 2025	25 May 2026
Kup BiH	First round	Quarter-finals	29 October 2025	10 March 2026
Europa Conference League	First qualifying round	First qualifying round	10 July 2025	17 July 2025

=== League table ===
Pos	Team	Pld	W	D	L	GF	GA	GD	Pts	Qualification or relegation
4	Velež Mostar	36	14	9	13	36	35	+1	51	Qualification to Conference League first qualifying round
5	Široki Brijeg	36	11	12	13	37	48	−11	45	
6	Željezničar	36	10	12	14	34	37	−3	42	
7	Radnik Bijeljina	36	8	11	17	27	45	−18	35	
8	Sloga Doboj	36	8	10	18	21	46	−25	34 (Note: Sloga finished ahead of Posušje on head-to-head points: Sloga 2–0 Posušje, Posušje 2–2 Sloga, Sloga 1–0 Posušje, Posušje 0–1 Sloga.)	

Source: Rezultati.com
Rules for classification: 1) Points; 2) Goal difference; 3) Goals scored; 4) Head-to-head points; 5) Head-to-head goal difference; 6) Head-to-head away goals (only if two teams); 7) Head-to-head goals scored; 8) Goal difference; 9) Play-off. (Criteria 2 and 3 are not used to decide champion, UEFA competition qualification, or relegation)

==== Results summary ====
Overall								Home						Away					
Pld	W	D	L	GF	GA	GD	Pts	W	D	L	GF	GA	GD	W	D	L	GF	GA	GD
36	10	12	14	34	37	−3	42	5	9	4	21	19	+2	5	3	10	13	18	−5

Source: Sportsport.ba

==== Results by round ====
Round	1	2	3	4	5	6	7	8	9	10	11	12	13	14	16	17	18	19	15^{1}	20	21	22	23	24	25	26	27	28	29	30	31	32	33	34	35	36
Ground	H	A	H	A	H	A	H	A	H	A	H	A	H	A	A	H	A	H	H	A	H	A	H	A	H	A	H	A	H	A	H	A	H	A	H	A
Result	D	W	D	W	W	D	W	L	W	L	W	D	L	L	L	D	L	D	D	L	L	L	L	W	L	D	D	W	D	W	D	L	W	L	D	L
Position	6	3	3	1	1	2	1	2	2	3	3	3	3	3	4	4	5	5	5	6	6	6	6	6	6	6	6	6	6	5	6	6	5	5	5	6
Points	1	4	5	8	11	12	15	15	18	18	21	22	22	22	22	23	23	24	25	25	25	25	25	28	28	29	30	33	34	37	38	38	41	41	42	42

A = Away; H = Home; W = Win; D = Draw; L = Loss

^{1}Match of Round 15 was postponed due to heavy snowfall.

==== Matches ====
27 July 2025 1	Željezničar	1–1	Radnik Bijeljina	Sarajevo
21:00	Ćosić 36' (o.g.); Radovac (yellow card) 90'	Report	Čumić 2'; Gogić (yellow card) 21'; Krajišnik (yellow card) 58'; Ghorzi (yellow card) 71'; Trako (yellow card) 83'; Marković (yellow card) 84'	Stadium: Grbavica Stadium; Attendance: 10,000; Referee: Nemanja Aleksić (Banja Luka)

3 August 2025 2	Posušje	0–1	Željezničar	Posušje
21:00	Kukavica (yellow card) 55'	Report	Troupée (yellow card) 12'; Alić 59'	Stadium: Mokri Dolac Stadium; Attendance: 3,000; Referee: Luka Bilbija (Prijedor)

9 August 2025 3	Željezničar	1–1	Rudar Prijedor	Sarajevo
21:00	Fočo (yellow card) 43'; Šošić (yellow card) 48'; Alić (yellow card) 58'; Seedorf 70'; Rakić (yellow card) 90+1'; Krpić (yellow card) 90+3'	Report	García 53', (yellow card) 85'; Galić (yellow card) 56'	Stadium: Grbavica Stadium; Attendance: 8,500; Referee: Dražen Marić (Bijeljina)

15 August 2025 4	Velež Mostar	0–1	Željezničar	Mostar
21:00	Hrkać (red card) 31'; Šarić (red card) 45+6'	Report	Seedorf (yellow card) 9'; Karamarko (red card) 46'; Erick 57', (yellow card) 90+2'; Muftić (yellow card) 90+2'	Stadium: Stadion Rođeni; Attendance: 5,500; Referee: Miloš Gigović (Gradiška)

24 August 2025 5	Željezničar	2–0	Zrinjski Mostar	Sarajevo
21:00	J. Pejić 45'; Peixoto 49'; Cvetanoski (yellow card) 56'	Report	Filipović (yellow card) 39'	Stadium: Grbavica Stadium; Attendance: 10,000; Referee: Haris Halkić (Sanski Most)

30 August 2025 6	Sloga Doboj	0–0	Željezničar	Doboj
17:00	Varga (yellow card) 38'	Report	Osmanović (yellow card) 28'; Alić (yellow card) 39'; Rakić (yellow card) 45+2'; Erick (yellow card) 62'; Šukilović (yellow card) 66'; Lagumdžija (yellow card) 90+7'	Stadium: Luke Stadium; Attendance: 1,200; Referee: Frano Jelić (Široki Brijeg)

15 September 2025 7	Željezničar	3–2	Borac Banja Luka	Sarajevo
21:00	Lagumdžija (yellow card) 49'; Šošić (yellow card) 71', (goal) 73'; Erick (yellow card) 75'; Cvetanoski 84'; Jaganjac 87', (yellow card) 88'; Alić (yellow card) 90+8'	Report	Hrelja 31'; Savić 37'; Saničanin (yellow card) 75'; Hiroš (yellow card) 90+7'	Stadium: Grbavica Stadium; Attendance: 11,300; Referee: Haris Halkić (Sanski Most)

21 September 2025 8	Široki Brijeg	1–0	Željezničar	Široki Brijeg
15:00	Sesar (yellow card) 26'; Ćalušić 50'; Kolarić (yellow card) 73'; M. Stanić (yellow card) 90'; Josipović (yellow card) 90+2'	Report	Lagumdžija (yellow card) 23'; Šabić (yellow card) 89'	Stadium: Pecara Stadium; Attendance: 1,800; Referee: Luka Bilbija (Prijedor)

27 September 2025 9	Željezničar	2–0	Sarajevo	Sarajevo
18:30	Erick 62'; Peixoto (yellow card) 76', (goal) 90+4'; Alić (yellow card) 77'; Rakić (yellow card) 80'; Troupée (yellow card) 83'; Abdulahović (yellow card) 86'	Report	Ristovski (yellow card) 40'; Guliashvili (yellow card) 41'; Oliveira (yellow card) 81'; Krdžalić (yellow card) 83'; Beganović (yellow card) 86'	Stadium: Grbavica Stadium; Attendance: 9,300; Referee: Nihad Ljajić (Sarajevo)

5 October 2025 10	Radnik Bijeljina	1–0	Željezničar	Bijeljina
17:00	Pantelić 31'; Krajišnik (yellow card) 63'; Osei (yellow card) 76'; Čubrilo (yellow card) 86'; Lakić (yellow card) 90+2'	Report	Alić (yellow card) 54'; Erick (yellow card) 90+1'	Stadium: Bijeljina City Stadium; Attendance: 1,000; Referee: Frano Jelić (Široki Brijeg)

18 October 2025 11	Željezničar	1–0	Posušje	Sarajevo
18:30	Jaganjac 47'	Report	Hanuljak (yellow card) 28'; Mikulić (yellow card) 65'	Stadium: Grbavica Stadium; Attendance: 8,500; Referee: Antonio Tomić (Kreševo)

25 October 2025 12	Rudar Prijedor	1–1	Željezničar	Prijedor
16:00	Karamarko 37' (o.g.); Puentes (yellow card) 78'	Report	Alić (yellow card) 20'; Lagumdžija 51'; Rakić (red card) 90+3'	Stadium: Gradski stadion Attendance: 2,150; Referee: Mateo Musa (Čitluk)

2 November 2025 13	Željezničar	1–2	Velež Mostar	Sarajevo
17:30	Karamarko (yellow card) 72'; Erick (yellow card) 88'; Boljević 90+4'	Report	Hrkać 9' (pen.); Babić (yellow card) 14'; Nukić (yellow card) 19'; Haskić (yellow card) 29'; Šerbečić (yellow card) 53'; Pidro 84', (yellow card) 90+6'	Stadium: Grbavica Stadium; Attendance: 10,250; Referee: Irfan Peljto (Sarajevo)

9 November 2025 14	Zrinjski Mostar	2–1	Željezničar	Mostar
15:15	Bilbija 52'; Mikić 76'; Filipović (yellow card) 90+3'	Report	Jakovljević 21' (o.g.); Lagumdžija (yellow card) 45'	Stadium: Stadion pod Bijelim Brijegom; Attendance: 2,000; Referee: Sabrija Topalović (Zenica)

29 November 2025 16	Borac Banja Luka	2–1	Željezničar	Banja Luka
16:00	Juričić 7'; Jojić 34'; Kvržić (yellow card) 90'	Report	J. Pejić (yellow card) 24'; Cvetanoski 44'; Odinaka (yellow card) 75'; Alić (yellow card) 90'	Stadium: Banja Luka City Stadium; Attendance: 3,000; Referee: Antonio Tomić (Kreševo)

4 December 2025 17 (Note: On 3 December, the match was abandoned in the 35th minute due to heavy fog. Subsequently, it was announced that the rearranged fixture would take place on 4 December.)	Željezničar	3–3	Široki Brijeg	Sarajevo
14:00	Musa 7' (o.g.); Rakić (yellow card) 18'; Cvetanoski 42'; Odinaka (yellow card) 53'; Boljević 83'; Jaganjac (yellow card) 89'; Karamarko (yellow card) 90+3'	Report	Charniak 1'; Tomić 10'; M. Stanić 17', (yellow card) 61'; Pranjić (yellow card) 58'; Lukić (yellow card) 86'; Kpan (yellow card) 90+3'; Bašić (yellow card) 90+5'	Stadium: Grbavica Stadium; Attendance: 1,800; Referee: Nemanja Aleksić (Banja Luka)

7 December 2025 18	Sarajevo	4–0	Željezničar	Sarajevo
13:00	Elezi 14'; Oliveira 42', (yellow card) 47'; Ristovski (yellow card) 45+6'; Mujkić (yellow card) 45+7'; Ljajić 45+10'; Cimirot (yellow card) 55'; Guliashvili (yellow card) 74'; Mlinarić 87', (yellow card) 87'	Report	Troupée (yellow card) 45+7'; Muftić (yellow card) 45+7'	Stadium: Asim Ferhatović Hase Stadium; Attendance: 8,500; Referee: Irfan Peljto (Sarajevo)

13 December 2025 19	Željezničar	0–0	Radnik Bijeljina	Sarajevo
16:00	Karamarko (yellow card) 22'; Šukilović (yellow card) 32'; Lagumdžija (yellow card) 89'	Report	Ghorzi (yellow card) 35'; Osei (yellow card) 37'; Črnko (yellow card) 49'; Markovina (yellow card) 80'; Dimitrić (yellow card) 90'; Trako (yellow card) 90+8'	Stadium: Grbavica Stadium; Attendance: 3,800; Referee: Mario Pejić (Grude)

17 December 2025 15 (Note: Match of Round 15, scheduled for 22 November 2025, was postponed for 17 December due to heavy snowfall.)	Željezničar	0–0	Sloga Doboj	Sarajevo
16:00	Osmanović (yellow card) 24'; Milošević (yellow card) 62'; Kolić (yellow card) 90+3'	Report	Tatar (yellow card) 52'; Grabež (yellow card) 79'; Mekić (yellow card) 87'; D. Savić (yellow card) 90+4'	Stadium: Grbavica Stadium; Attendance: 1,300; Referee: Mateo Musa (Čitluk)

8 February 2026 20	Posušje	1–0	Željezničar	Posušje
13:00	Kukavica (yellow card) 11'; Petković 73'	Report	Odinaka (yellow card) 45'; Cvetanoski (yellow card) 50'	Stadium: Mokri Dolac Stadium; Attendance: 2,000; Referee: Luka Bilbija (Prijedor)

16 February 2026 21	Željezničar	0–3	Rudar Prijedor	Sarajevo
18:00	Nastić (yellow card) 85'	Report	Bolívar 8'; Puentes 48'; Danese (yellow card) 63'; Romera 71'	Stadium: Grbavica Stadium; Attendance: 3,500; Referee: Josip Martinović (Čapljina)

21 February 2026 22	Velež Mostar	1–0	Željezničar	Mostar
15:00	Kuzmanović (yellow card) 35'; Šarić 60' (pen.); Nukić (yellow card) 62'; Vehabović (yellow card) 88'	Report	Milošević (yellow card) 34'; Krpić (yellow card) 77'	Stadium: Stadion Rođeni; Attendance: 2,700; Referee: Mirza Kazlagić (Cazin)

2 March 2026 23	Željezničar	1–3	Zrinjski Mostar	Sarajevo
21:00	Pejić (yellow card) 41'; Nastić (yellow card) 51'; Alić (yellow card) 81'; Dragović 90+1'	Report	Juric 23', 55', 68'	Stadium: Grbavica Stadium; Attendance: 7,467; Referee: Ermin Sivac (Zenica)

7 March 2026 24	Sloga Doboj	0–3	Željezničar	Doboj
15:00	Predragović (yellow card) 81'; Kunić (yellow card) 86'; Milanović (yellow card) 89'	Report	Peixoto (yellow card) 8', (goal) 43'; Jaganjac (yellow card) 76', (goal) 90+2'; Alić 90' (pen.)	Stadium: Luke Stadium; Attendance: 1,500; Referee: Frano Jelić (Široki Brijeg)

14 March 2026 25	Željezničar	0–1	Borac Banja Luka	Sarajevo
15:00	Alić (yellow card) 55'	Report	Jurkas (yellow card) 64'; Sijarić (yellow card) 76' (yellow-red card) 80'; Herrera 90+1', (yellow card) 90+1'	Stadium: Grbavica Stadium; Attendance: 6,300; Referee: Armin Kukić (Bugojno)

22 March 2026 26	Široki Brijeg	1–1	Željezničar	Široki Brijeg
15:00	Senić 42', (yellow card) 90+21'; M. Matić (yellow card) 59'; Puljić (yellow card) 90+13'	Report	Seedorf 38'; Radovac (yellow card) 90+5'; Erick (yellow card) 90+13'	Stadium: Pecara Stadium; Attendance: 2,500; Referee: Haris Halkić (Sanski Most)

4 April 2026 27	Željezničar	0–0	Sarajevo	Sarajevo
20:45	Muftić (yellow card) 40'; Pejić (yellow card) 62'	Report	Carlos (yellow card) 40'; Ljajić (yellow card) 81'	Stadium: Grbavica Stadium; Attendance: 8,000; Referee: Admir Musić (Sarajevo)

11 April 2026 28	Radnik Bijeljina	0–3	Željezničar	Bijeljina
16:00	Đurić (yellow card) 70' (yellow-red card) 88'; Agyemang (yellow card) 70'; Karjašević (yellow card) 89'	Report	Bičakčić 1'; Šabić (yellow card) 7'; Odinaka 22'; Pejić (yellow card) 40'; Krpić 75'	Stadium: Bijeljina City Stadium; Attendance: 1,300; Referee: Darko Gedžić (Brčko)

17 April 2026 29	Željezničar	1–1	Posušje	Sarajevo
20:30	Šabić 59'	Report	Čuić 54'	Stadium: Grbavica Stadium; Attendance: 6,500; Referee: Dražen Marić (Bijeljina)

21 April 2026 30	Rudar Prijedor	0–1	Željezničar	Prijedor
18:00		Report	Seedorf (yellow card) 27'; Prokop (yellow card) 78'; Peixoto 90+4'	Stadium: Gradski stadion Attendance: 2,000; Referee: Frano Jelić (Široki Brijeg)

25 April 2026 31	Željezničar	0–0	Velež Mostar	Sarajevo
20:45		Report	Abdullah (yellow card) 47'	Stadium: Grbavica Stadium; Attendance: 7,000; Referee: Dragan Petrović (Banja Luka)

1 May 2026 32	Zrinjski Mostar	2–0	Željezničar	Mostar
20:30	Bilbija 19', (yellow card) 70'; Ćavar 45'; Dujmović (yellow card) 61'	Report	Erick (yellow card) 23'; Pejić (yellow card) 44'; Jaganjac (yellow card) 87'	Stadium: Stadion pod Bijelim Brijegom; Attendance: 2,000; Referee: Dražen Marić (Bijeljina)

10 May 2026 33	Željezničar	3–0	Sloga Doboj	Sarajevo
17:30	Krpić 54'; Prokop 69'; Jaganjac 76'; Šabić (yellow card) 90'	Report		Stadium: Grbavica Stadium; Attendance: 4,000; Referee: Miloš Gigović (Gradiška)

16 May 2026 34	Borac Banja Luka	1–0	Željezničar	Banja Luka
18:00	Saničanin (yellow card) 64'; Hiroš (yellow card) 66'; Juričić 72'	Report	Radovac (yellow card) 51'; Krpić (yellow card) 60'; Odinaka (yellow card) 75'; Milošević (yellow card) 79'	Stadium: Banja Luka City Stadium; Attendance: 2,500; Referee: Frano Jelić (Široki Brijeg)

21 May 2026 35	Željezničar	2–2	Široki Brijeg	Sarajevo
20:30	Odinaka 9'; Prokop 12'	Report	Bajkuša 42', (yellow card) 69'; F. Matić 54'; M. Matić (yellow card) 86'	Stadium: Grbavica Stadium; Attendance: 3,500; Referee: Elvedin Topuzović (Tuzla)

25 May 2026 36	Sarajevo	1–0	Željezničar	Sarajevo
20:30	Elezi 45+3'; Telalović (yellow card) 50'	Report	Krpić (yellow card) 21'; Alić (yellow card) 48'; Pejić (yellow card) 90+5'	Stadium: Asim Ferhatović Hase Stadium; Attendance: 9,000; Referee: Sabrija Topalović (Zenica)

=== Kup BiH ===
==== Round of 32 ====
29 October 2025	Sloboda Tuzla	0–2	Željezničar	Tuzla
20:15	M. Jaganjac (yellow card) 3'; Šećerović (yellow card) 86'	Report	Alić 87', (yellow card) 88'; Boljević 90+4'	Stadium: Tušanj City Stadium; Attendance: 4,500; Referee: Ermin Sivac (Zenica)

==== Round of 16 ====
12 February 2026	Željezničar	4–0	Slavija Sarajevo	Sarajevo
18:00	Alić 10' (pen.), 90+1'; Prokop 66'; Seedorf 69'	Report	Perišić (yellow card) 40'	Stadium: Grbavica Stadium; Attendance: 5,465; Referee: Mirza Kazlagić (Cazin)

==== Quarter-finals ====
25 February 2026 First leg	Željezničar	0–1	Sloga Doboj	Sarajevo
16:00	Prokop (yellow card) 80'	Report	Božičković (yellow card) 45+6'; Batar (yellow card) 51'; Hasanović (yellow card) 60'; Jović 90+4'	Stadium: Grbavica Stadium; Attendance: 1,000; Referee: Josip Martinović (Čapljina)

10 March 2026 Second leg	Sloga Doboj	0–1 (1–1 agg.) (5–4 p)	Željezničar	Doboj
18:30	Žerjal (yellow card) 2'; Hasanović (yellow card) 37'; Mehmedović (yellow card) 85'	Report	Alić 44'; Jaganjac (yellow card) 90'	Stadium: Luke Stadium; Attendance: 800; Referee: Ermin Sivac (Zenica)
	Penalties
	Tatar (penalty missed); Mehmedović (penalty scored); Dejanović (penalty scored); Omić (penalty missed); Vidić (penalty scored); Žerjal (penalty scored); Perković (penalty scored)		(penalty scored) Krpić; (penalty missed) Husković; (penalty scored) Alić; (penalty missed) Galchev; (penalty scored) Erick; (penalty scored) Nastić; (penalty missed) Šabić

=== UEFA Conference League ===
==== First qualifying round ====
10 July 2025 First leg	Željezničar (Bosnia and Herzegovina)	1–1	(Slovenia) Koper	Sarajevo, Bosnia and Herzegovina
20:30	Alić (yellow card) 58'; Karamarko (yellow card) 72'; Troupée (yellow card) 78'; Boljević 90+6', (yellow card) 90+7'	Report	Matondo 7'; Curcio (yellow card) 24'; Iličić (yellow card) 72'	Stadium: Grbavica Stadium; Attendance: 12,847; Referee: Ashot Ghaltakhchyan (Armenia)

17 July 2025 Second leg	Koper (Slovenia)	3–1 (4–2 agg.)	(Bosnia and Herzegovina) Željezničar	Koper, Slovenia
19:30	Curcio (yellow card) 12'; Mittendorfer (yellow card) 25'; Mijailović 44'; Manseri 45+1', (yellow card) 67'; Longonda 45+8'; Jurhar (yellow card) 67'	Report	Krpić 26' (pen.); Seedorf (yellow card) 62'; Šabić (yellow card) 74'; Erick (yellow card) 90+1'	Stadium: Bonifika; Attendance: 4,009; Referee: Menelaos Antoniou (Cyprus)

== Statistics ==
=== Goalscorers ===
Rank	No.	Pos.	Nat.	Player	Premier League BiH	Kup BiH	Conference League	Total
1	3	DF	(Bosnia and Herzegovina)	Enes Alić	2	4	—	6
2	9	FW	(Bosnia and Herzegovina)	Hamza Jaganjac	4	—	—	4
2	11	MF	(Brazil)	Vini Peixoto	4	—	—	4
2	23	MF	(Montenegro)	Aleksandar Boljević	2	1	1	4
5	7	FW	(Bosnia and Herzegovina)	Sulejman Krpić	2	—	1	3
5	8	MF	(Austria)	Dominik Prokop	2	1	—	3
5	14	MF	(North Macedonia)	Matej Cvetanoski	3	—	—	3
5	33	DF	(Netherlands)	Collin Seedorf	2	1	—	3
9	2	DF	(Nigeria)	Edwin Odinaka	2	—	—	2
9	18	MF	(Brazil)	João Erick	2	—	—	2
11	4	DF	(Bosnia and Herzegovina)	Ermin Bičakčić	1	—	—	1
11	8	MF	(Croatia)	Dan Lagumdžija	1	—	—	1
11	10	MF	(Bosnia and Herzegovina)	Madžid Šošić	1	—	—	1
11	16	MF	(Bosnia and Herzegovina)	Dženan Šabić	1	—	—	1
11	23	MF	(Bosnia and Herzegovina)	Eldar Dragović	1	—	—	1
11	42	MF	(Croatia)	Josip Pejić	1	—	—	1
Own goals (from the opponents)					3	—	—	3
Totals					34	7	2	43

=== Assists ===
Rank	No.	Pos.	Nat.	Player	Premier League BiH	Kup BiH	Conference League	Total
1	2	DF	(Nigeria)	Edwin Odinaka	6	—	—	6
2	3	DF	(Bosnia and Herzegovina)	Enes Alić	4	—	—	4
2	10	MF	(Bosnia and Herzegovina)	Madžid Šošić	3	—	1	4
4	9	FW	(Bosnia and Herzegovina)	Hamza Jaganjac	3	—	—	3
4	27	MF	(Bosnia and Herzegovina)	Deni Milošević	1	2	—	3
6	16	MF	(Bosnia and Herzegovina)	Dženan Šabić	1	—	1	2
6	29	FW	(Austria)	Muharem Husković	2	—	—	2
8	7	FW	(Bosnia and Herzegovina)	Sulejman Krpić	1	—	—	1
8	11	MF	(Brazil)	Vini Peixoto	1	—	—	1
8	14	MF	(North Macedonia)	Matej Cvetanoski	—	1	—	1
8	18	MF	(Brazil)	João Erick	1	—	—	1
8	19	DF	(Bosnia and Herzegovina)	Mustafa Šukilović	—	1	—	1
8	23	MF	(Bosnia and Herzegovina)	Eldar Dragović	—	1	—	1
8	33	DF	(Netherlands)	Collin Seedorf	1	—	—	1
8	34	MF	(Morocco)	Ismail Oulad M'Hand	1	—	—	1
8	42	MF	(Croatia)	Josip Pejić	1	—	—	1
8	55	MF	(Bosnia and Herzegovina)	Armin Hodžić	1	—	—	1
8	99	FW	(Serbia)	Davor Rakić	1	—	—	1
Totals					28	5	2	35

=== Clean sheets ===
Rank	No.	Nat.	Player	Premier League BiH	Kup BiH	Conference League	Total
1	13	(Bosnia and Herzegovina)	Vedad Muftić	13	3	0	16
2	1	(Bosnia and Herzegovina)	Tarik Abdulahović	1	—	—	1
Totals				14	3	0	17

=== Disciplinary record ===
No.	Pos.	Nat.	Name	Premier League BiH			Kup BiH			Conference League			Total		
No.	Pos.	Nat.	Name	Booked	(yellow card) (yellow-red card)	Sent off (straight red)	Booked	(yellow card) (yellow-red card)	Sent off (straight red)	Booked	(yellow card) (yellow-red card)	Sent off (straight red)	Booked	(yellow card) (yellow-red card)	Sent off (straight red)
3	DF	(Bosnia and Herzegovina)	Enes Alić	10			1			1			12		
18	MF	(Brazil)	João Erick	7						1			8		
6	MF	(Serbia)	Aleksa Pejić	5									5		
8	MF	(Croatia)	Dan Lagumdžija	5									5		
9	FW	(Bosnia and Herzegovina)	Hamza Jaganjac	4			1						5		
2	DF	(Nigeria)	Edwin Odinaka	4									4		
6	DF	(Croatia)	Marin Karamarko	3		1				1			4		1
7	FW	(Bosnia and Herzegovina)	Sulejman Krpić	4									4		
16	MF	(Bosnia and Herzegovina)	Dženan Šabić	3						1			4		
20	DF	(Curaçao)	Giovanni Troupée	3						1			4		
99	FW	(Serbia)	Davor Rakić	4		1							4		1
13	GK	(Bosnia and Herzegovina)	Vedad Muftić	3									3		
33	DF	(Netherlands)	Collin Seedorf	2						1			3		
88	MF	(Bosnia and Herzegovina)	Samir Radovac	3									3		
8	MF	(Austria)	Dominik Prokop	1			1						2		
10	MF	(Bosnia and Herzegovina)	Madžid Šošić	2									2		
11	MF	(Brazil)	Vini Peixoto	2									2		
14	MF	(North Macedonia)	Matej Cvetanoski	2									2		
15	DF	(Bosnia and Herzegovina)	Bojan Nastić	2									2		
19	DF	(Bosnia and Herzegovina)	Mustafa Šukilović	2									2		
27	MF	(Bosnia and Herzegovina)	Deni Milošević	2									2		
90	DF	(Luxembourg)	Edin Osmanović	2									2		
1	GK	(Bosnia and Herzegovina)	Tarik Abdulahović	1									1		
5	MF	(Bosnia and Herzegovina)	Afan Fočo	1									1		
23	MF	(Montenegro)	Aleksandar Boljević							1			1		
26	MF	(Bosnia and Herzegovina)	Malik Kolić	1									1		
42	MF	(Croatia)	Josip Pejić	1									1		
Totals				79		2	3			7			89		2

Source: Competitive matches and fkzeljeznicar.ba
Ordered by (red card) , (second yellow card) and (yellow card)
(yellow card) = Number of bookings; (second yellow card) = Number of sending offs after a second yellow card; (red card) = Number of sending offs by a direct red card.
