= 2024–25 FK Željezničar season =

Željezničar
2024–25 season
- Chairman: Admir Tunović
- Manager: Denis Ćorić (until 19 May); Omer Joldić (caretaker, from 20 May)
- Stadium: Grbavica Stadium
- Premier League BiH: 4th
- Kup BiH: Semi-finals
- Top goalscorer: League: Sulejman Krpić; Aleksandar Boljević (11 each); All: Sulejman Krpić; Aleksandar Boljević (14 each)
- Highest home attendance: 13,500 vs Zrinjski (21 September 2024)
- Lowest home attendance: 800 vs Kruševo (12 March 2025)
- Average home league attendance: 8,376

The 2024–25 season was Željezničar's 104th in existence and their 25th season in the Bosnian Premier League. Besides competing in the domestic league, the team also competed in the National Cup.

The club finished the season in 4th place, qualifying for the 2025–26 UEFA Conference League first qualifying round. Željezničar got knocked out from the cup in the semi-finals.

== Season review ==
=== June ===
On 10 June, Željezničar announced Elvir Rahimić as the club's new sporting director.

On 12 June, Željezničar announced Denis Ćorić as the club's new manager.

On 20 June, Željezničar announced the departure of Ajdin Mulalić.

On 25 June, Željezničar announced the retirement of Edin Cocalić and the departure of seven players. The club also announced the signings of 26-year-old Bože Vukoja and 28-year-old Ivan Đorić.

On 26 June, Željezničar announced the signings of 26-year-olds Tarik Abdulahović and Marin Karamarko.

On 30 June, Željezničar announced the departure of Haris Ovčina.

=== July ===
On 1 July, Željezničar announced the signing of 20-year-old Edwin Odinaka.

On 5 July, Željezničar announced the signing of 26-year-old Huso Karjašević.

On 8 July, Željezničar announced the retirement of Semir Štilić.

On 12 July, Željezničar announced the signing of 26-year-old Matej Cvetanoski.

On 17 July, Željezničar announced the signing of 30-year-old Stipo Marković.

On 31 July, Željezničar announced the departure of Joseph Amoah.

=== August ===
On 1 August, Željezničar announced WWin as the club's new general sponsor.

On 6 August, Željezničar announced the departure of Amar Drina.

On 7 August, Željezničar announced the signings of 27-year-old Martin Mirchevski and 18-year-old Ognjen Laušević.

On 12 August, Željezničar announced the signing of 29-year-old Filip Dangubić.

On 19 August, Željezničar and Vedad Muftić negotiated a two-year contract extension lasting until July 2026. The club also negotiated a one-year contract extension with Sulejman Krpić, lasting until July 2025.

=== September ===
On 3 September, Željezničar announced the departure of Ivan Đorić.

On 4 September, Željezničar announced the departure of Faris Zubanović.

On 5 September, Željezničar announced the departure of Bože Vukoja.

On 9 September, Željezničar announced the signing of 21-year-old Mustafa Šukilović.

On 20 September, Željezničar and Abdulmalik Al-Jaber negotiated a one-year contract extension until July 2026.

=== December ===
On 23 December, Željezničar announced the departure of Harun Karić.

=== January ===
On 1 January, Željezničar announced the departure of Amer Hiroš.

On 8 January, Željezničar announced the signing of 22-year-old Dan Lagumdžija.

On 9 January, Željezničar announced the signing of 22-year-old Madžid Šošić.

On 14 January, Željezničar negotiated one-year contract extensions with Sulejman Krpić, Huso Karjašević and Mustafa Šukilović until July 2026.

On 16 January, Željezničar announced the signings of 22-year-old Léo Simoni and 23-year-old Vini Peixoto.

On 22 January, Željezničar negotiated a two-year contract extension with Samir Radovac until July 2027.

On 25 January, Željezničar negotiated a two-year contract extension with Aleksandar Boljević until July 2027.

=== February ===
On 28 February, Željezničar negotiated a three-year contract extension with Dženan Šabić until July 2028.

=== March ===
On 5 March, Željezničar negotiated a one-year contract extension with Marin Karamarko until July 2026.

=== May ===
On 19 May, Željezničar announced the departure of manager Denis Ćorić.

== First-team squad ==
N	Pos.	Nat.	Name	Age	EU	Since	App	Goals	Ends	Transfer fee	Notes
Goalkeepers
1	GK	(Bosnia and Herzegovina)	Tarik Abdulahović	28	Non-EU	2024	6	0	2026	Free	Originally from youth system
13	GK	(Bosnia and Herzegovina)	Vedad Muftić	24	Non-EU	2020	92	0	2026	Youth system	Originally from youth system
Defenders
2	DF	(Nigeria)	Edwin Odinaka	22	Non-EU	2024	28	1	2026	Free	
3	DF	(Montenegro)	Stefan Radinović	26	Non-EU	2024	28	0	2025	Free	
4	DF	(Montenegro)	Nemanja Cavnić	31	Non-EU	2024	32	0	2025	Free	
6	DF	(Croatia)	Marin Karamarko	28	EU	2024	30	1	2026	Free	
19	DF	(Bosnia and Herzegovina)	Mustafa Šukilović	23	Non-EU	2024	25	2	2026	Free	
20	DF	(Brazil)	Léo Simoni	24	Non-EU	2025	4	0	2026	Free	
24	DF	(Bosnia and Herzegovina)	Marin Galić	31	Non-EU	2022	108	2	2025	Free	
25	DF	(Bosnia and Herzegovina)	Aiman Šemdin	20	Non-EU	2024	2	0	2026	Youth system	Originally from youth system
33	DF	(Bosnia and Herzegovina)	Stipo Marković	32	Non-EU	2024	29	0	2025	Free	
44	DF	(Bosnia and Herzegovina)	Azur Mahmić	23	Non-EU	2024	21	0	2026	Free	
Midfielders
5	MF	(Bosnia and Herzegovina)	Afan Fočo	18	Non-EU	2024	16	0	2026	Youth system	Originally from youth system
8	MF	(Croatia)	Dan Lagumdžija	23	EU	2025	12	2	2027	Free	
10	MF	(Bosnia and Herzegovina)	Madžid Šošić	24	Non-EU	2025	19	10	2027	Free	Originally from youth system
11	MF	(Brazil)	Vini Peixoto	25	Non-EU	2025	7	1	2026	Free	
14	MF	(North Macedonia)	Matej Cvetanoski	29	Non-EU	2024	34	7	2026	Free	
16	MF	(Bosnia and Herzegovina)	Dženan Šabić	20	Non-EU	2022	32	1	2028	Youth system	Originally from youth system
17	MF	(Bosnia and Herzegovina)	Huso Karjašević	29	Non-EU	2024	25	0	2026	Free	
22	MF	(Saudi Arabia)	Abdulmalik Al-Jaber	22	Non-EU	2023	48	4	2026	Free	
23	MF	(Montenegro)	Aleksandar Boljević	30	Non-EU	2023	48	17	2027	Free	
26	MF	(Bosnia and Herzegovina)	Malik Kolić	19	Non-EU	2024	6	0	2025	Youth system	Originally from youth system
70	MF	(North Macedonia)	Martin Mirchevski	29	Non-EU	2024	18	0	2025	Free	
88	MF	(Bosnia and Herzegovina)	Samir Radovac	30	Non-EU	2024	39	1	2027	Free	
Forwards
7	FW	(Bosnia and Herzegovina)	Sulejman Krpić (captain)	35	Non-EU	2023	141	56	2026	Free	
9	FW	(Croatia)	Filip Dangubić	31	EU	2024	34	11	2025	Free	
15	FW	(Bosnia and Herzegovina)	Ernad Babaluk	20	Non-EU	2024	2	0	2025	Youth system	Originally from youth system
18	FW	(Serbia)	Ognjen Laušević	20	Non-EU	2024	10	4	2026	Free	

- Source: fkzeljeznicar.ba
- Ordered by squad number.

== Transfers ==
=== In ===
No.	Pos.	Player	Transferred from	Fee	Date	Source
8	MF	(Serbia) Ivan Đorić	Igman Konjic	Free transfer	25 June 2023	
77	MF	(Bosnia and Herzegovina) Bože Vukoja	Zvijezda 09	Free transfer	25 June 2023	
1	GK	(Bosnia and Herzegovina) Tarik Abdulahović	Tuzla City	Free transfer	26 June 2023	
6	DF	(Croatia) Marin Karamarko	(Russia) Arsenal Tula	Free transfer	26 June 2023	
2	DF	(Nigeria) Edwin Odinaka	Stupčanica	Free transfer	1 July 2024	
17	MF	(Bosnia and Herzegovina) Huso Karjašević	Tuzla City	Free transfer	5 July 2024	
14	MF	(North Macedonia) Matej Cvetanoski	(North Macedonia) AP Brera	Free transfer	12 July 2024	
33	DF	(Bosnia and Herzegovina) Stipo Marković	(Slovenia) Radomlje	Free transfer	17 July 2024	
18	FW	(Serbia) Ognjen Laušević	(Serbia) Teleoptik U19	Free transfer	7 August 2024	
70	MF	(North Macedonia) Martin Mirchevski	(Serbia) TSC	Free transfer	7 August 2024	
9	FW	(Croatia) Filip Dangubić	(Lithuania) Kauno Žalgiris	Free transfer	12 August 2024	
19	DF	(Bosnia and Herzegovina) Mustafa Šukilović	Tuzla City	Free transfer	9 September 2024	
8	MF	(Croatia) Dan Lagumdžija	GOŠK Gabela	Free transfer	8 January 2025	
10	MF	(Bosnia and Herzegovina) Madžid Šošić	(Croatia) Hajduk Split	Free transfer	9 January 2025	
11	MF	(Brazil) Vini Peixoto	(Brazil) Tubarão	Free transfer	16 January 2025	
20	DF	(Brazil) Léo Simoni	(Brazil) Frederiquense	Free transfer	16 January 2025	
Total					€0	

Total expenditure: €0

=== Out ===
No.	Pos.	Player	Transferred to	Fee	Date	Source
99	GK	(Bosnia and Herzegovina) Filip Dujmović	(North Macedonia) Struga	End of contract	6 June 2024	
1	GK	(Bosnia and Herzegovina) Ajdin Mulalić	(Slovenia) Domžale	Contract termination	20 June 2024	
6	DF	(Bosnia and Herzegovina) Edin Cocalić	—	Retirement	25 June 2024	
8	MF	(Bosnia and Herzegovina) Nedim Mekić	(Greece) Lamia	End of contract	25 June 2024	
9	FW	(Bosnia and Herzegovina) Dženan Haračić	Sloboda Tuzla	End of contract	25 June 2024	
17	MF	(Bosnia and Herzegovina) Andrija Drljo	(Kazakhstan) Kyzylzhar	Contract termination	25 June 2024	
18	MF	(Croatia) Josip Mijić	(Croatia) Solin	Contract termination	25 June 2024	
21	MF	(Bosnia and Herzegovina) Adonis Bilal	Željezničar Banja Luka	End of contract	25 June 2024	
25	MF	(Bosnia and Herzegovina) Edin Biber	Free agent	End of contract	25 June 2024	
77	MF	(Bosnia and Herzegovina) Haris Ovčina	Sloga Doboj	End of contract	30 June 2024	
14	MF	(Bosnia and Herzegovina) Semir Štilić	—	Retirement	8 July 2024	
26	MF	(Ghana) Joseph Amoah	(United Arab Emirates) Al Jazirah Al Hamra	End of contract	31 July 2024	
19	DF	(Bosnia and Herzegovina) Amar Drina	(Poland) Miedź Legnica	Contract termination	6 August 2024	
8	MF	(Serbia) Ivan Đorić	Igman Konjic	Contract termination	3 September 2024	
11	FW	(Bosnia and Herzegovina) Faris Zubanović	Famos	Contract termination	4 September 2024	
77	MF	(Bosnia and Herzegovina) Bože Vukoja	(Bulgaria) Hebar Pazardzhik	Contract termination	5 September 2024	
20	MF	(Bosnia and Herzegovina) Harun Karić	(Kyrgyzstan) Abdysh-Ata	Contract termination	23 December 2024	
10	MF	(Bosnia and Herzegovina) Amer Hiroš	Borac Banja Luka	End of contract	1 January 2025	
Total					€0	

Total income: €0
Net: €0

== Coaching staff ==
Position	Name
Head coach	(Bosnia and Herzegovina) Omer Joldić (caretaker)
Assistant coach	(Bosnia and Herzegovina) Admir Derviši
Goalkeeping coach	(Bosnia and Herzegovina) Adnan Gušo
Fitness coach	(Bosnia and Herzegovina) Almir Seferović
Video analyst	(Bosnia and Herzegovina) Jasmin Krajina
Doctors	(Bosnia and Herzegovina) Zlatko Dervišević
Doctors	(Bosnia and Herzegovina) Sanjin Saračević
Doctors	(Bosnia and Herzegovina) Harun Đozić
Physiotherapists	(Bosnia and Herzegovina) Raif Zeba
Physiotherapists	(Bosnia and Herzegovina) Adil Hubijar
Physiotherapists	(Bosnia and Herzegovina) Emir Kraljušić
Commissioner for Security	(Bosnia and Herzegovina) Erdijan Pekić
Scout	(Bosnia and Herzegovina) Semir Štilić

- Source: fkzeljeznicar.ba

== Competitions ==
=== Pre-season ===
4 July 2024 Friendly	Željezničar (Bosnia and Herzegovina)	1–3	(Bosnia and Herzegovina) Igman Konjic	Sarajevo
18:00	Krpić 12'	Report	Hebibović 16'; Bešagić 52'; Hrustanović 82'	Stadium: Grbavica Stadium

10 July 2024 Friendly	Sloboda Užice (Serbia)	2–3	(Bosnia and Herzegovina) Željezničar	Zlatibor, Serbia
19:30	Glišović 35' (pen.), 45' (pen.)	Report	Šabić 41'; Radovac 72'; Al-Rakaf 85'	Stadium: Stadion Švajcarija

18 July 2024 Friendly	Zrinjski Mostar (Bosnia and Herzegovina)	1–0	(Bosnia and Herzegovina) Željezničar	Mostar
20:30	Šunjić 18'	Report		Stadium: Stadion pod Bijelim Brijegom

24 July 2024 Friendly	Željezničar (Bosnia and Herzegovina)	4–0	(Bosnia and Herzegovina) Kruševo	Sarajevo
17:30	Al-Jaber; Zubanović; Drina; Laušević	Report		Stadium: Grbavica Stadium

27 July 2024 Friendly	Željezničar (Bosnia and Herzegovina)	2–0	(Bosnia and Herzegovina) Tuzla City	Sarajevo
18:00	Hiroš 62'; Boljević 67'	Report		Stadium: Grbavica Stadium

28 July 2024 Friendly	Orahovica (Bosnia and Herzegovina)	0–2	(Bosnia and Herzegovina) Željezničar	Orahovica Donja
18:00		Report	Zubanović 18'; Karić 36'	Stadium: Stadion Barica

=== Mid-season ===
11 September 2024 Friendly	Kiseljak (Bosnia and Herzegovina)	0–4	(Bosnia and Herzegovina) Željezničar	Kiseljak
16:00		Report	Dangubić 29'; Trogrančić 63'; Laušević 73' (pen.); Odinaka 85'	Stadium: Stadion hrvatskih branitelja

11 October 2024 Friendly	Stupčanica (Bosnia and Herzegovina)	1–1	(Bosnia and Herzegovina) Željezničar	Olovo
16:00	Mehanović 56'	Report	Krpić 20'	Stadium: Danac Stadium

29 January 2025 Friendly	Željezničar (Bosnia and Herzegovina)	0–1	(South Korea) Gangwon	Antalya, Turkey
13:00		Report	Lee 78'

1 February 2025 Friendly	Željezničar (Bosnia and Herzegovina)	2–3	(Ukraine) Karpaty Lviv	Antalya, Turkey
13:30	Cvetanoski 28'; Fočo 90+2'	Report	Krasnopir 6'; Klymenko 14'; Polehenko 90+5'

3 February 2025 Friendly	Željezničar (Bosnia and Herzegovina)	2–3	(Germany) Freiberg	Antalya, Turkey
14:00	Laušević 5'; Šabić 55'	Report	El-Helwe 25' (pen.); Kehl-Gómez 42'; 90'

4 February 2025 Friendly	Željezničar (Bosnia and Herzegovina)	2–0	(North Macedonia) Sileks	Antalya, Turkey
16:30	Krpić 65', 75'	Report

=== Overall ===
Competition	Started round	Final result	First match	Last Match
Premier League BiH	—N/a	4th	3 August 2024	31 May 2025
Kup BiH	First round	Semi-finals	29 October 2024	16 April 2025

=== League table ===
Pos	Team	Pld	W	D	L	GF	GA	GD	Pts	Qualification or relegation
2	Borac Banja Luka	33	26	3	4	58	13	+45	81	Qualification to Conference League first qualifying round
3	Sarajevo	33	18	11	4	59	24	+35	65	Qualification to Conference League second qualifying round (Note: Since the winners of the 2024–25 Bosnian Cup, Sarajevo, finished in the top three of the Premier League, the remaining Conference League first qualifying round spot was passed to the fourth-placed team.)
4	Željezničar	33	20	5	8	55	38	+17	65	Qualification to Conference League first qualifying round
5	Široki Brijeg	33	13	7	13	43	46	−3	46	
6	Sloga Doboj	33	13	5	15	35	45	−10	44	

Source: Rezultati.com
Rules for classification: 1) Points; 2) Goal difference; 3) Goals scored; 4) Head-to-head points; 5) Head-to-head goal difference; 6) Head-to-head away goals (only if two teams); 7) Head-to-head goals scored; 8) Goal difference; 9) Play-off. (Criteria 2 and 3 are not used to decide champion, UEFA competition qualification, or relegation)

==== Results summary ====
Overall								Home						Away					
Pld	W	D	L	GF	GA	GD	Pts	W	D	L	GF	GA	GD	W	D	L	GF	GA	GD
33	20	5	8	55	38	+17	65	12	3	2	31	16	+15	8	2	6	24	22	+2

Source: Sportsport.ba

==== Results by round ====
Round	1	2	3	4	5	6	7	8	9	10	11	12	13	14	15	16	17	18	19	20	21	22	23	24	25	26	27	28	29	30	31	32	33
Ground	H	A	H	A	H	A	H	A	H	A	H	A	H	A	H	A	H	A	H	A	H	A	H	A	H	A	H	A	H	H	A	H	A
Result	L	W	W	W	D	W	L	D	W	L	W	W	W	W	W	L	W	L	D	D	D	W	W	W	W	L	W	L	W	W	L	W	W
Position	9	6	3	3	2	2	4	3	3	4	4	4	4	4	4	4	4	4	4	4	4	4	4	4	4	4	4	4	4	4	4	4	4
Points	0	3	6	9	10	13	13	14	17	17	20	23	26	29	32	32	35	35	36	37	38	41	44	47	50	50	53	53	56	59	59	62	65

Source: Competitions
A = Away; H = Home; W = Win; D = Draw; L = Loss

==== Matches ====
3 August 2024 1	Željezničar	0–1	Široki Brijeg	Sarajevo
21:00	Hiroš (yellow card) 57'; Radovac (yellow card) 68'	Report	Ćavar 13'; Kožulj (yellow card) 33'; Bagarić (yellow card) 53'	Stadium: Grbavica Stadium; Attendance: 12,000; Referee: Luka Bilbija (Prijedor)

10 August 2024 2	Velež Mostar	1–2	Željezničar	Mostar
21:00	Mlinarić (yellow card) 44', (goal) 53'; Lauš (yellow card) 75'	Report	Odinaka 73'; Boljević 85'; Krpić (yellow card) 88'	Stadium: Stadion Rođeni; Attendance: 5,000; Referee: Haris Halkić (Sanski Most)

17 August 2024 3	Željezničar	3–1	Igman Konjic	Sarajevo
21:00	Galić (yellow card) 8'; Krpić 23'; Al-Jaber 28', (yellow card) 35'; Šabić (yellow card) 36'; Cvetanoski 59'	Report	Buturović (yellow card) 11'; Posinković (yellow card) 33'; Božić (yellow card) 48'; Ramić 72'	Stadium: Grbavica Stadium; Attendance: 13,000; Referee: Mirza Kazlagić (Cazin)

24 August 2024 4	Sloboda Tuzla	0–1	Željezničar	Tuzla
21:00	Šero (yellow card) 22'; Haračić (yellow card) 36'; Cvijanović (yellow card) 45+4'; Dubačkić (yellow card) 64'	Report	Krpić (yellow card) 27'; Cavnić (yellow card) 45+4'; Al-Jaber 62'	Stadium: Tušanj City Stadium; Attendance: 2,300; Referee: Antoni Bandić (Grude)

1 September 2024 5	Željezničar	1–1	Sloga Doboj	Sarajevo
18:45	Krpić 61'; Cavnić (yellow card) 68'; Galić (yellow card) 90'	Report	Milićević (yellow card) 18'; Odinaka 21' (o.g.); Varga (yellow card) 33'; Omić (yellow card) 64'; Grabež (yellow card) 86'; Pavlović (yellow card) 90+14'; Predragović (yellow card) 90+15'	Stadium: Grbavica Stadium; Attendance: 12,500; Referee: Josip Martinović (Čapljina)

16 September 2024 6	GOŠK Gabela	0–3	Željezničar	Gabela
18:00	Mandić (red card) 8'	Report	Radovac (yellow card) 67'; Hiroš 74', 90+1'; Krpić 85'	Stadium: Stadium Perica-Pero Pavlović; Attendance: 400; Referee: Miloš Gigović (Gradiška)

21 September 2024 7	Željezničar	0–2	Zrinjski Mostar	Sarajevo
20:45	Radovac (yellow card) 13'	Report	Savić (yellow card) 11'; Barišić (yellow card) 41'; Mulahusejnović 66'; Ivančić (yellow card) 89'; Ćavar 90+2'	Stadium: Grbavica Stadium; Attendance: 13,500; Referee: Aleksandar Njegomirović (Prnjavor)

25 September 2024 8	Sarajevo	1–1	Željezničar	Sarajevo
20:30	Jović (yellow card) 26'; Soldo 61'; Mehmedović (yellow card) 68'	Report	Krpić (yellow card) 18'; Boljević 42'; Cavnić (yellow card) 52'; Karić (yellow card) 90+4'; Muftić (yellow card) 90+7'	Stadium: Asim Ferhatović Hase Stadium; Attendance: 24,000; Referee: Admir Musić (Sarajevo)

29 September 2024 9	Željezničar	1–0	Posušje	Sarajevo
15:00	Karamarko (yellow card) 29'; Al-Jaber (yellow card) 35'; Radovac (yellow card) 43'; Dangubić 55'; Mahmić (yellow card) 66'	Report	Boban (yellow card) 6'	Stadium: Grbavica Stadium; Attendance: 7,500; Referee: Ernis Džemidžić (Goražde)

20 October 2024 (Note: Match of Round 10, scheduled for 7 October 2024, was postponed for 20 October due to a state of emergency caused by heavy floods.) 10	Borac Banja Luka	1–0	Željezničar	Banja Luka
19:45	Kvržić 36'; Nikolov (yellow card) 63'; Herrera (yellow card) 90+2'	Report	Dangubić (yellow card) 21'; Marković (yellow card) 50'; Hiroš (yellow card) 68'; Odinaka (yellow card) 88'	Stadium: Banja Luka City Stadium; Attendance: 4,000; Referee: Mateo Musa (Čitluk)

25 October 2024 11	Željezničar	2–0	Radnik Bijeljina	Sarajevo
18:00	Boljević 90+3', 90+6' (pen.), (yellow card) 90+4'	Report	Nathan (yellow card) 86'	Stadium: Grbavica Stadium; Attendance: 6,500; Referee: Ermin Sivac (Zenica)

3 November 2024 12	Široki Brijeg	0–3	Željezničar	Široki Brijeg
19:45	Bagarić (yellow card) 64'	Report	Dangubić 57'; Krpić 60'; Karić (yellow card) 63'; Cvetanoski (yellow card) 84', (goal) 90'	Stadium: Pecara Stadium; Attendance: 2,500; Referee: Sabrija Topalović (Zenica)

10 November 2024 13	Željezničar	2–1	Velež Mostar	Sarajevo
13:00	Krpić (yellow card) 2', (goal) 84' (pen.); Boljević 63'; Cvetanoski (yellow card) 86'; Šukilović (yellow card) 88'	Report	Halilović (yellow card) 22'; Išasegi (yellow card) 33'; Lohan 90+2'	Stadium: Grbavica Stadium; Attendance: Dragan Todić (Doboj); Referee: 10,000

22 November 2024 14	Igman Konjic	0–2	Željezničar	Konjic
13:00	Posinković (red card) 12'; Hebibović (yellow card) 18'	Report	Šukilović 51'; Boljević 52'	Stadium: Konjic City Stadium; Attendance: 600; Referee: Antonio Tomić (Kreševo)

30 November 2024 15	Željezničar	3–0	Sloboda Tuzla	Sarajevo
16:00	Šukilović 15'; Boljević 53'; Al-Jaber (yellow card) 69'; Karić 90+2'	Report	Muminović (yellow card) 42'; Bratovčić (yellow card) 67'	Stadium: Grbavica Stadium; Attendance: 6,500; Referee: Ermin Sivac (Zenica)

4 December 2024 16	Sloga Doboj	4–2	Željezničar	Doboj
13:00	Jović 23' (pen.); Popara (yellow card) 30', (goal) 48'; Omić 40'; Ovčina 58', (yellow card) 80'; Karać (yellow card) 65'	Report	Karjašević (yellow card) 7'; Krpić (yellow card) 45'; Dangubić 70' (pen.); Karamarko 82'	Stadium: Luke Stadium; Attendance: 800; Referee: Josip Martinović (Čapljina)

9 December 2024 17	Željezničar	4–1	GOŠK Gabela	Sarajevo
18:00	Krpić 27', 46', 75'; Radovac (yellow card) 30'; Boljević (red card) 84'; Dangubić 88'	Report	Mihaljević 18'; Lukić (yellow card) 73'	Stadium: Grbavica Stadium; Attendance: 5,000; Referee: Ernis Džemidžić (Goražde)

16 February 2025 18	Zrinjski Mostar	1–0	Željezničar	Mostar
15:15	Pranjić 5'; Savić (yellow card) 83'; Tičinović (yellow card) 84'	Report	Karjašević (yellow card) 52'	Stadium: Stadion pod Bijelim Brijegom; Attendance: 3,000; Referee: Luka Bilbija (Prijedor)

22 February 2025 19	Željezničar	0–0	Sarajevo	Sarajevo
16:00	Cvetanoski (yellow card) 34'; Šukilović (yellow card) 52'; Lagumdžija (yellow card) 66'; Krpić (yellow card) 74'	Report	Beganović (yellow card) 17'; Guliashvili (yellow card) 35'; Soldo (yellow card) 36'; Gojković (yellow card) 90+1'	Stadium: Grbavica Stadium; Attendance: 12,500; Referee: Nihad Ljajić (Sarajevo)

2 March 2025 20	Posušje	1–1	Željezničar	Posušje
13:00	Mrkonjić (yellow card) 34'; Čuljak 68'; Vrgoč (yellow card) 82'	Report	Radovac (yellow card) 19'; Laušević 77'; Boljević (yellow card) 82'	Stadium: Mokri Dolac Stadium; Attendance: 1,500; Referee: Aleksandar Njegomirović (Prnjavor)

9 March 2025 21	Željezničar	1–1	Borac Banja Luka	Sarajevo
19:45	Šošić 12'; Šukilović (yellow card) 44'; Mirchevski (yellow card) 49'; Al-Jaber (yellow card) 74'; Cvetanoski (red card) 80'; Fočo (yellow card) 84'	Report	Ogrinec 1'; Herrera (yellow card) 40'	Stadium: Grbavica Stadium; Attendance: 9,300; Referee: Antonio Tomić (Kreševo)

16 March 2025 22	Radnik Bijeljina	2–3	Željezničar	Bijeljina
17:00	Maričić 48' (pen.), 90+1' (pen.); Janjić (yellow card) 61'	Report	Šošić 37'; Radovac 56'; Karjašević (yellow card) 59'; Karamarko (yellow card) 84'; Marković (yellow card) 89'; Krpić (yellow card) 90'; Boljević 90+5'	Stadium: Bijeljina City Stadium; Attendance: 1,800; Referee: Dragan Petrović (Banja Luka)

28 March 2025 23	Željezničar	3–2	Posušje	Sarajevo
20:45	Šošić 31'; Krpić 45+3' (pen.), 90+5'; Šukilović (yellow card) 56'	Report	Stapić (yellow card) 25'; Ćurdo 51'; Hanuljak 74'; Bekavac (yellow card) 79'; Soldo (yellow card) 89'	Stadium: Grbavica Stadium; Attendance: 5,800; Referee: Dragan Kesić (Gradiška)

5 April 2025 24	Igman Konjic	0–1	Željezničar	Konjic
15:00	Nurković (yellow card) 41'	Report	Šabić 89'; Galić (yellow card) 90+4'; Krpić (yellow card) 90+5'	Stadium: Konjic City Stadium; Attendance: 1,600; Referee: Antoni Bandić (Grude)

12 April 2025 25	Željezničar	3–2	GOŠK Gabela	Sarajevo
17:00	Šošić 14'; Dangubić 44'; Krpić 51'	Report	K. Perić (yellow card) 25', (goal) 65' (pen.); Šuta (yellow card) 76'; Jovanović 80', (yellow card) 90'; N. Perić (yellow card) 81'	Stadium: Grbavica Stadium; Attendance: 6,000; Referee: Ernis Džemidžić (Goražde)

19 April 2025 26	Zrinjski Mostar	5–0	Željezničar	Mostar
17:30	Topić 1'; Ivančić (yellow card) 17'; Bilbija 30' (pen.), 35'; Abramović 38', 40'	Report	Galić (yellow card) 50'; Šošić (yellow card) 84'	Stadium: Stadion pod Bijelim Brijegom; Attendance: 4,000; Referee: Haris Halkić (Sanski Most)

23 April 2025 27	Željezničar	2–1	Borac Banja Luka	Sarajevo
20:45	Dangubić (yellow card) 38'; Mahmić (yellow card) 48'; Peixoto (yellow card) 52'; Cvetanoski 76', (yellow card) 90+11'; Al-Jaber (yellow card) 82'; Šošić 90+8'; Laušević (yellow card) 90+8'; Radinović (yellow card) 90+11'	Report	Meijers (yellow card) 43'; Hiroš 53'; Vuković (yellow card) 60'	Stadium: Grbavica Stadium; Attendance: 6,300; Referee: Aleksandar Njegomirović (Prnjavor)

27 April 2025 28	Sarajevo	2–1	Željezničar	Sarajevo
15:00	Kyeremeh 39'; Gordeziani 47' (pen.); Paskalev (yellow card) 53'; Mujkić (yellow card) 90+2'	Report	Cavnić (yellow card) 43'; Boljević 70'	Stadium: Asim Ferhatović Hase Stadium; Attendance: 14,000; Referee: Nihad Ljajić (Sarajevo)

4 May 2025 29	Željezničar	3–2	Sloboda Tuzla	Sarajevo
15:00	Muftić (yellow card) 21'; Cvetanoski 39'; Boljević 53' (pen.); Radinović (yellow card) 62'; Kurtalić 70' (o.g.)	Report	Bojo 22' (pen.); Jovašević (yellow card) 45+1'; Said (yellow card) 87', (goal) 90+2'	Stadium: Grbavica Stadium; Attendance: 5,000; Referee: Armin Kukić (Bugojno)

11 May 2025 30	Željezničar	1–0	Sloga Doboj	Sarajevo
17:30	Lagumdžija 50'; Boljević (yellow card) 57'; Krpić (yellow card) 57'; Cvetanoski (yellow card) 70'; Radovac (yellow card) 90+1'; Karjašević (yellow card) 90+4'	Report	Ovčina (yellow card) 84'	Stadium: Grbavica Stadium; Attendance: 6,000; Referee: Frano Jelić (Široki Brijeg)

18 May 2025 31	Široki Brijeg	3–2	Željezničar	Široki Brijeg
19:45	Marcinho 26'; M. Stanić 30' (pen.); Posavac (yellow card) 34'; Kolarić 85'	Report	Karamarko (yellow card) 28'; Šukilović (yellow card) 45+2'; Lagumdžija (yellow card) 61'; Al-Jaber 75'; Dangubić 90+4'	Stadium: Pecara Stadium; Attendance: 1,100; Referee: Antonio Tomić (Kreševo)

25 May 2025 32	Željezničar	2–1	Velež Mostar	Sarajevo
15:00	Dangubić 25', (yellow card) 58'; Šošić (yellow card) 28'; Krpić (yellow card) 40'; Lagumdžija (yellow card) 43'; Galić (yellow card) 43'; Karjašević (yellow card) 73'; Peixoto 86', (yellow card) 86'; Al-Jaber (yellow card) 87'; Radinović (yellow card) 90+2'; Muftić (yellow card) 90+4'	Report	Hrkać (yellow card) 55'; Halilović 60', (yellow card) 63'; Đurić (yellow card) 74'; Pidro (yellow card) 83'	Stadium: Grbavica Stadium; Attendance: 5,000; Referee: Luka Bilbija (Prijedor)

31 May 2025 33	Radnik Bijeljina	1–2	Željezničar	Bijeljina
17:00	Krajišnik (yellow card) 43'; Pantelić 54'; Da Silva (yellow card) 57'	Report	Boljević 50'; Lagumdžija 69'; Šabić (yellow card) 74'	Stadium: Bijeljina City Stadium; Attendance: 1,120; Referee: Dragan Petrović (Banja Luka)

=== Kup BiH ===
==== Round of 32 ====
29 October 2024	Leotar	0–3	Željezničar	Trebinje
14:00	Glogovac (yellow card) 37'; Leko (yellow card) 82'	Report	Dangubić 17', 65'; Karjašević (yellow card) 32'; Cvetanoski 88'	Stadium: Police Stadium; Attendance: 600; Referee: Mario Pejić (Grude)

==== Round of 16 ====
8 February 2025	Željezničar	6–0	Vareš	Sarajevo
18:30	Cvetanoski 22'; Šošić 27', 38', 78'; Krpić 44', 70'	Report	N. Hercegovac (yellow card) 11'; Džafo (yellow card) 87'	Stadium: Grbavica Stadium; Attendance: 7,000; Referee: Dragan Kesić (Gradiška)

==== Quarter-finals ====
25 February 2025 First leg	Kruševo	1–8	Željezničar	Mostar
13:00	Džeba (yellow card) 51', (goal) 71'; Raguž (yellow card) 85'	Report	Dangubić 7', 30'; Laušević 10', 23'; Boljević 37' (pen.), 39'; Mirchevski (yellow card) 39'; Krpić 90'; Cvetanoski 90+2'	Stadium: Stadion pod Bijelim Brijegom; Attendance: 500; Referee: Davor Vukašinović (Rogatica)

12 March 2025 Second leg	Željezničar	3–1 (11–2 agg.)	Kruševo	Sarajevo
15:00	Laušević 29' (pen.); Šukilović (yellow card) 33'; Kolić (yellow card) 41'; Šošić 71', 84'	Report	Slišković (yellow card) 47'; Čule 57'	Stadium: Grbavica Stadium; Attendance: 800; Referee: Armin Kukić (Bugojno)

==== Semi-finals ====
2 April 2025 First leg	Široki Brijeg	3–0	Željezničar	Široki Brijeg
18:00	Jukić 12'; Lukić 39'; Al-Jaber 48' (o.g.); P. Stanić (yellow card) 76'; Medić (yellow card) 78'	Report	Dangubić (yellow card) 72'; Odinaka (yellow card) 89'	Stadium: Pecara Stadium; Attendance: 2,000; Referee: Luka Bilbija (Prijedor)

16 April 2025 Second leg	Željezničar	1–0 (1–3 agg.)	Široki Brijeg	Sarajevo
17:30	Boljević 37' (pen.); Karjašević (yellow card) 61'; Abdulahović (yellow card) 62'; Krpić (yellow card) 87'	Report	Josipović (yellow card) 24'; Mekić (yellow card) 69'; Marcinho (yellow card) 88'	Stadium: Grbavica Stadium; Attendance: 7,600; Referee: Ermin Sivac (Zenica)

== Statistics ==
=== Goalscorers ===
Rank	No.	Pos.	Nat.	Player	Premier League BiH	Kup BiH	Total
1	7	FW	(Bosnia and Herzegovina)	Sulejman Krpić	11	3	14
1	23	MF	(Montenegro)	Aleksandar Boljević	11	3	14
3	9	FW	(Croatia)	Filip Dangubić	7	4	11
4	10	MF	(Bosnia and Herzegovina)	Madžid Šošić	5	5	10
5	14	MF	(North Macedonia)	Matej Cvetanoski	4	3	7
6	18	FW	(Serbia)	Ognjen Laušević	1	3	4
7	22	MF	(Saudi Arabia)	Abdulmalik Al-Jaber	3	—	3
8	8	MF	(Croatia)	Dan Lagumdžija	2	—	2
8	10	MF	(Bosnia and Herzegovina)	Amer Hiroš	2	—	2
8	19	DF	(Bosnia and Herzegovina)	Mustafa Šukilović	2	—	2
11	2	DF	(Nigeria)	Edwin Odinaka	1	—	1
11	6	DF	(Croatia)	Marin Karamarko	1	—	1
11	11	MF	(Brazil)	Vini Peixoto	1	—	1
11	16	MF	(Bosnia and Herzegovina)	Dženan Šabić	1	—	1
11	20	MF	(Bosnia and Herzegovina)	Harun Karić	1	—	1
11	88	MF	(Bosnia and Herzegovina)	Samir Radovac	1	—	1
Own goals (from the opponents)					1	—	1
Totals					55	21	76

=== Assists ===
Rank	No.	Pos.	Nat.	Player	Premier League BiH	Kup BiH	Total
1	14	MF	(North Macedonia)	Matej Cvetanoski	5	4	9
2	7	FW	(Bosnia and Herzegovina)	Sulejman Krpić	6	—	6
2	23	MF	(Montenegro)	Aleksandar Boljević	5	1	6
4	10	MF	(Bosnia and Herzegovina)	Madžid Šošić	4	1	5
5	9	FW	(Croatia)	Filip Dangubić	3	1	4
5	33	DF	(Bosnia and Herzegovina)	Stipo Marković	4	—	4
7	16	MF	(Bosnia and Herzegovina)	Dženan Šabić	2	1	3
7	22	MF	(Saudi Arabia)	Abdulmalik Al-Jaber	3	—	3
7	88	MF	(Bosnia and Herzegovina)	Samir Radovac	2	1	3
10	2	DF	(Nigeria)	Edwin Odinaka	1	1	2
10	8	MF	(Croatia)	Dan Lagumdžija	1	1	2
10	24	DF	(Bosnia and Herzegovina)	Marin Galić	1	1	2
10	70	MF	(North Macedonia)	Martin Mirchevski	2	—	2
14	3	DF	(Montenegro)	Stefan Radinović	—	1	1
14	4	DF	(Montenegro)	Nemanja Cavnić	1	—	1
14	6	DF	(Croatia)	Marin Karamarko	1	—	1
14	10	MF	(Bosnia and Herzegovina)	Amer Hiroš	1	—	1
14	13	GK	(Bosnia and Herzegovina)	Vedad Muftić	1	—	1
14	17	MF	(Bosnia and Herzegovina)	Huso Karjašević	1	—	1
14	18	FW	(Serbia)	Ognjen Laušević	—	1	1
14	25	DF	(Bosnia and Herzegovina)	Aiman Šemdin	—	1	1
14	26	MF	(Bosnia and Herzegovina)	Malik Kolić	—	1	1
Totals					44	16	60

=== Clean sheets ===
Rank	No.	Nat.	Player	Premier League BiH	Kup BiH	Total
1	13	(Bosnia and Herzegovina)	Vedad Muftić	9	2	11
2	1	(Bosnia and Herzegovina)	Tarik Abdulahović	1	2	3
Totals				10	4	14

=== Disciplinary record ===
No.	Pos.	Nat.	Name	Premier League BiH			Kup BiH			Total		
No.	Pos.	Nat.	Name	Booked	(yellow card) (yellow-red card)	Sent off (straight red)	Booked	(yellow card) (yellow-red card)	Sent off (straight red)	Booked	(yellow card) (yellow-red card)	Sent off (straight red)
7	FW	(Bosnia and Herzegovina)	Sulejman Krpić	10			1			11		
17	MF	(Bosnia and Herzegovina)	Huso Karjašević	5			2			7		
88	MF	(Bosnia and Herzegovina)	Samir Radovac	7						7		
19	DF	(Bosnia and Herzegovina)	Mustafa Šukilović	5			1			6		
22	MF	(Saudi Arabia)	Abdulmalik Al-Jaber	6						6		
14	MF	(North Macedonia)	Matej Cvetanoski	5		1				5		1
24	DF	(Bosnia and Herzegovina)	Marin Galić	5						5		
4	DF	(Montenegro)	Nemanja Cavnić	4						4		
9	FW	(Croatia)	Filip Dangubić	3			1			4		
3	DF	(Montenegro)	Stefan Radinović	3						3		
6	DF	(Croatia)	Marin Karamarko	3						3		
8	MF	(Croatia)	Dan Lagumdžija	3						3		
13	GK	(Bosnia and Herzegovina)	Vedad Muftić	3						3		
23	MF	(Montenegro)	Aleksandar Boljević	3		1				3		1
2	DF	(Nigeria)	Edwin Odinaka	1			1			2		
10	MF	(Bosnia and Herzegovina)	Amer Hiroš	2						2		
10	MF	(Bosnia and Herzegovina)	Madžid Šošić	2						2		
11	MF	(Brazil)	Vini Peixoto	2						2		
16	MF	(Bosnia and Herzegovina)	Dženan Šabić	2						2		
20	MF	(Bosnia and Herzegovina)	Harun Karić	2						2		
33	DF	(Bosnia and Herzegovina)	Stipo Marković	2						2		
44	DF	(Bosnia and Herzegovina)	Azur Mahmić	2						2		
70	MF	(North Macedonia)	Martin Mirchevski	1			1			2		
1	GK	(Bosnia and Herzegovina)	Tarik Abdulahović				1			1		
5	MF	(Bosnia and Herzegovina)	Afan Fočo	1						1		
18	FW	(Serbia)	Ognjen Laušević	1						1		
26	MF	(Bosnia and Herzegovina)	Malik Kolić				1			1		
Totals				83		2	9			92		2

Source: Competitive matches and fkzeljeznicar.ba
Ordered by (red card) , (second yellow card) and (yellow card)
(yellow card) = Number of bookings; (second yellow card) = Number of sending offs after a second yellow card; (red card) = Number of sending offs by a direct red card.
