= Marin Karamarko =

Croatian footballer (born 1998)

Personal information
- Date of birth: 14 April 1998 (age 28)
- Place of birth: Pula, Croatia
- Height: 1.91 m (6 ft 3 in)
- Position: Centre-back

Team information
- Current team: Željezničar
- Number: 4

Youth career
- 2006–2009: Omladinac Vranjic
- 2010–2012: Solin
- 2012–2015: Hajduk Split

Senior career*
Years	Team	Apps	(Gls)
2015–2016	Hajduk Split	0	(0)
2015–2016	→ OSK Otok (loan)	24	(0)
2016	OSK Otok	13	(0)
2017	Val	30	(1)
2018	RNK Split	8	(0)
2018–2019	GOŠK Gabela	25	(0)
2019–2022	Mura	48	(1)
2022–2023	TSV Hartberg	13	(0)
2024	Arsenal Tula	4	(0)
2024–2026	Željezničar	41	(1)
2026	Wisła Płock	4	(0)
2026–	Željezničar	12	(0)

International career
2014	Croatia U16	3	(0)
2014–2015	Croatia U17	4	(0)
2015	Croatia U18	3	(0)
- * Club domestic league appearances and goals as of 21 November 2026

Marin Karamarko (born 14 April 1998) is a Croatian professional footballer who plays as a centre-back for Bosnian Premier League club Željezničar.

== Career statistics ==
As of match played 21 November 2026

Appearances and goals by club, season and competition
Club	Season	League			National cup (Note: Includes Bosnian Cup, Slovenian Cup)		Continental		Total	
Club	Season	Division	Apps	Goals	Apps	Goals	Apps	Goals	Apps	Goals
GOŠK Gabela	2018–19	Bosnian Premier League	25	0	2	0	—		27	0
Mura	2019–20	Slovenian PrvaLiga	27	1	3	0	1 (Note: Appearance in UEFA Europa League)	0	31	1
Mura	2021–22	Slovenian PrvaLiga	21	0	—		4 (Note: One appearance in UEFA Champions League, three appearances in UEFA Europa Conference League)	0	25	0
Mura	Total		48	1	3	0	5	0	56	1
TSV Hartberg	2022–23	Austrian Football Bundesliga	13	0	—		—		13	0
Arsenal Tula	2023–24	Russian First League	4	0	—		—		4	0
Željezničar	2024–25	Bosnian Premier League	25	1	5	0	—		30	1
Željezničar	2025–26	Bosnian Premier League	16	0	1	0	2 (Note: Appearances in UEFA Conference League)	0	19	0
Željezničar	Total		41	1	6	0	2	0	49	1
Wisła Płock	2025–26	Ekstraklasa	3	0	—		—		3	0
Wisła Płock	2026–27	Ekstraklasa	1	0	—		—		1	0
Wisła Płock	Total		4	0	—		—		4	0
Željezničar	2026–27	Bosnian Premier League	12	0	1	0	—		13	0
Career total			147	2	12	0	7	0	166	2

== Honours ==
Mura

- Slovenian Cup: 2019–20
