= Matej Cvetanoski =

Macedonian footballer (born 1997)

Matej Cvetanoski Матеј Цветаноски
Personal information
- Date of birth: 18 August 1997 (age 29)
- Place of birth: Skopje, Macedonia
- Height: 1.79 m (5 ft 10 in)
- Position: Winger

Team information
- Current team: Željezničar
- Number: 11

Youth career
- –2016: Makedonija G.P.

Senior career*
Years	Team	Apps	(Gls)
2016–2017	Makedonija G.P.	32	(2)
2017	Pelister	17	(1)
2018–2020	Vardar	75	(11)
2021	Shkupi	28	(7)
2022	Gyirmót	10	(0)
2022	Partizani	8	(0)
2023–2024	AP Brera	31	(4)
2024–	Željezničar	54	(7)

International career
2015	Macedonia U19	2	(0)
- * Club domestic league appearances and goals as of 21 November 2026

Matej Cvetanoski (Macedonian: Матеј Цветаноски; born 18 August 1997) is a Macedonian professional footballer who plays as a winger for Bosnian Premier League club Željezničar.

== Career statistics ==
=== Club ===
As of match played 21 November 2026

Appearances and goals by club, season and competition
Club	Season	League	League		Cup		Europe		Total	
Club	Season	League	Apps	Goals	Apps	Goals	Apps	Goals	Apps	Goals
Makedonija G.P.	2016–17	Macedonian First League	32	2	0	0	–		32	2
Pelister	2017–18	Macedonian First League	17	1	0	0	2	0	19	1
Vardar	2017–18	Macedonian First League	9	0	1	0	–		10	0
Vardar	2018–19	Macedonian First League	28	2	0	0	1	0	29	2
Vardar	2019–20	Macedonian First League	22	3	0	0	–		22	3
Vardar	2020–21	Macedonian First League	16	6	0	0	–		16	6
Vardar	Total		75	11	1	0	1	0	77	11
Shkupi	2020–21	Macedonian First League	14	2	–		–		14	2
Shkupi	2021–22	Macedonian First League	14	5	1	0	4	0	19	5
Shkupi	Total		28	7	1	0	4	0	33	7
Gyirmót	2021–22	Nemzeti Bajnokság I	10	0	0	0	–		10	0
Partizani	2022–23	Kategoria Superiore	8	0	1	0	2	0	11	0
AP Brera	2022–23	Macedonian First League	6	0	–		–		6	0
AP Brera	2023–24	Macedonian First League	25	4	1	1	–		26	5
AP Brera	Total		31	4	1	1	–		32	5
Željezničar	2024–25	Bosnian Premier League	29	4	5	3	–		34	7
Željezničar	2025–26	Bosnian Premier League	22	3	3	0	2	0	27	3
Željezničar	2026–27	Bosnian Premier League	3	0	1	0	–		4	0
Željezničar	Total		54	7	9	3	2	0	65	10
Career total			255	32	13	4	11	0	279	36

== Honours ==
Vardar

- Macedonian First League: 2019–20
