= Joey Konings =

Dutch footballer (born 1998)

Personal information
- Date of birth: 21 April 1998 (age 28)
- Place of birth: Schaijk, Netherlands
- Height: 1.78 m (5 ft 10 in)
- Position: Centre-forward

Youth career
- 2005–2006: DAW
- 2006–2007: HVCH
- 2007–2008: RKC Waalwijk
- 2008–2015: PSV

Senior career*
Years	Team	Apps	(Gls)
2015–2018	Jong PSV	16	(1)
2018–2020	Heracles Almelo	30	(3)
2020–2022	De Graafschap	62	(10)
2022–2023	Den Bosch	34	(10)
2023–2024	Emmen	34	(5)
2025	Eindhoven	13	(0)
2025–2026	Željezničar	10	(0)

International career
2014	Netherlands U16	7	(4)
2014	Netherlands U17	3	(1)
2015	Netherlands U18	3	(0)
- * Club domestic league appearances and goals as of 2 November 2025

Joey Konings (21 April 1998) is a Dutch professional footballer who plays as a centre-forward.

== Club career ==
=== PSV ===
Having played for three clubs in his first three years of youth football, Konings joined the PSV academy from RKC Waalwijk in 2008. He made his professional debut as a Jong PSV player in the Eerste Divisie on 18 September 2015 against Sparta Rotterdam. He replaced Moussa Sanoh after 65 minutes.

=== Heracles Almelo ===
On 21 June 2018, Konings joined Heracles Almelo on a two-year contract. He made his Eredivisie debut on 2 December 2018 in Heracles' 4–1 win over VVV-Venlo. He scored his first goal for the club from close range in their 4–3 defeat to Willem II on 2 April 2019. He made 17 appearances in total across the 2018–19 Eredivisie season. He scored once in 15 matches during the 2019–20 season.

=== De Graafschap ===
On 13 May 2020, Konings signed a two-year contract with De Graafschap, with the option of an additional year. He made his debut for the club on 31 August, coming on as a 90th-minute substitute for Danny Verbeek in a 4–2 win over Den Bosch on the first matchday of the season. He finished his first season at the club with four goals in 34 total appearances, as he would mostly appear as a substitute. De Graafschap ended in third place in the league table, and faced eighth-placed Roda JC Kerkrade in the first round of play-offs for promotion. However, the match ended in disappointment as De Graafschap lost 2–3 at home, which meant that they would remain in the second division for the 2021–22 season. Konings came on in the 73rd minute of the game as a replacement for Clint Leemans, but could not prevent the defeat.

Konings finished the 2021–22 season with 8 goals in 33 appearances.

=== Den Bosch ===
On 23 June 2022, Konings signed for Den Bosch on a free transfer, signing a two-year contract.

=== Emmen ===
On 23 August 2023, Konings signed for Emmen on a two-year deal. On 2 January 2025, he left Emmen by mutual consent.

=== Eindhoven ===
On 4 February 2025, Konings joined Eindhoven on an amateur basis.

=== Željezničar ===
On 21 July 2025, Konings signed a two-year contract with Bosnian Premier League side Željezničar. He made his debut for the club in a 1–0 victory away against Posušje on 3 August 2025.

== International career ==
Konings was a youth international for the Netherlands.

== Career statistics ==
As of match played 2 November 2025

Club	Season	League			National cup		Europe		Other		Total	
Club	Season	Division	Apps	Goals	Apps	Goals	Apps	Goals	Apps	Goals	Apps	Goals
Jong PSV	2015–16	Eerste Divisie	1	0	0	0	—		—		1	0
Jong PSV	2016–17	Eerste Divisie	1	0	0	0	—		—		1	0
Jong PSV	2017–18	Eerste Divisie	14	1	0	0	—		—		14	1
Jong PSV	Total		16	1	0	0	—		—		16	1
Heracles Almelo	2018–19	Eredivisie	15	2	0	0	—		2 (Note: Appearances in the Eredivisie European play-offs)	0	17	2
Heracles Almelo	2019–20	Eredivisie	15	1	1	0	—		—		16	1
Heracles Almelo	Total		30	3	1	0	—		2	0	33	3
De Graafschap	2020–21	Eerste Divisie	31	3	2	1	—		1 (Note: Appearances in the promotion/relegation play-offs)	0	34	4
De Graafschap	2021–22	Eerste Divisie	31	7	1	1	—		1	0	33	8
De Graafschap	Total		62	10	3	2	—		2	0	67	12
Den Bosch	2022–23	Eerste Divisie	34	10	2	0	—		—		36	10
Emmen	2023–24	Eerste Divisie	34	5	0	0	—		4	0	38	5
Emmen	2024–25	Eerste Divisie	0	0	0	0	—		—		0	0
Emmen	Total		34	5	0	0	—		4	0	38	5
Eindhoven	2024–25	Eerste Divisie	13	0	0	0	—		—		36	10
Željezničar	2025–26	Bosnian Premier League	10	0	1	0	—		—		11	0
Career total			199	29	7	2	—		8	0	214	31
