= Madžid Šošić =

Bosnian footballer (born 2002)

Personal information
- Date of birth: 12 August 2002 (age 24)
- Place of birth: Bugojno, Bosnia and Herzegovina
- Height: 1.72 m (5 ft 8 in)
- Position: Attacking midfielder

Team information
- Current team: Željezničar
- Number: 10

Youth career
- 2007–2011: Iskra Bugojno
- 2011–2020: Željezničar

Senior career*
Years	Team	Apps	(Gls)
2020–2021	Hajduk Split II	22	(1)
2020–2024	Hajduk Split	0	(0)
2021–2022	→ Zrinjski Mostar (loan)	6	(0)
2022–2024	→ Radomlje (loan)	62	(12)
2025–	Željezničar	37	(6)

International career
2019	Bosnia and Herzegovina U17	7	(1)
2019–2020	Bosnia and Herzegovina U19	3	(1)
2022–2024	Bosnia and Herzegovina U21	7	(1)
2024	Bosnia and Herzegovina	1	(0)
- * Club domestic league appearances and goals as of 7 November 2026

Madžid Šošić (pronounced [mâːdʒid ʃǒʃitɕ]; born 12 August 2002) is a Bosnian professional footballer who plays as an attacking midfielder for Bosnian Premier League club Željezničar.

Šošić started his professional career at Hajduk Split, playing first in its reserve team, before being loaned to Zrinjski Mostar in 2021 and to Radomlje in 2022. He joined Željezničar in 2025.

A former youth international for Bosnia and Herzegovina, Šošić made his senior international debut in 2024.

== Club career ==
=== Hajduk Split ===
Šošić started playing football at his hometown club Iskra Bugojno in 2007, before joining the youth academy of Željezničar in 2011. In August 2020, he signed a three-year deal with Croatian team Hajduk Split. He made his professional debut playing for Hajduk Split's reserve squad against Opatija on 14 August at the age of 18. On 29 November, he scored his first professional goal in a triumph over Međimurje.

In July 2021, Šošić was sent on a season-long loan to Zrinjski Mostar. In September, he suffered a severe knee injury, which was diagnosed as an anterior cruciate ligament tear and was ruled out for at least six months.

In July 2022, he was loaned to Slovenian side Radomlje until the end of the campaign. In August 2023, his loan was extended for an additional season.

In June, Šošić prolonged his contract with Hajduk Split until June 2026. He made his official debut for the team in a Croatian Cup game against Bilogora on 17 September 2024.

=== Željezničar ===
On 9 January 2025, Šošić joined Željezničar on a free transfer, signing a two-and-a-half-year contract. He scored a hat-trick in his debut against Vareš in the Bosnian Cup second round on 8 February 2025. On 23 April 2025, Šošić scored the winning goal 8 minutes into stoppage time against Borac Banja Luka in a 2–1 home victory. He was made the team captain on 24 June 2025.

Šošić scored his first goal of the 2025–26 season in a 3–2 comeback win over Borac on 15 September 2025, after being 2–0 down at half-time. On 18 October 2025, Šošić re–injured his anterior cruciate ligament against Posušje, ruling him out for ten months. He played in his first match since his injury on 7 August 2026 in the opening game of the season against BSK Banja Luka, which Željezničar won 2–1.

== International career ==
Šošić represented Bosnia and Herzegovina at various youth levels.

In May 2024, he received his first senior call-up, for friendly games against England and Italy. He debuted against the latter on 9 June.

== Career statistics ==
=== Club ===
As of match played 7 November 2026

Appearances and goals by club, season and competition
Club	Season	League			National cup (Note: Includes Slovenian Cup, Croatian Cup, Bosnian Cup)		Continental		Total	
Club	Season	Division	Apps	Goals	Apps	Goals	Apps	Goals	Apps	Goals
Hajduk Split II	2020–21	Croatian First League	22	1	–		–		22	1
Zrinjski Mostar (loan)	2021–22	Bosnian Premier League	6	0	0	0	–		6	0
Radomlje (loan)	2022–23	Slovenian PrvaLiga	30	3	1	0	–		31	3
Radomlje (loan)	2023–24	Slovenian PrvaLiga	32	9	2	1	–		34	10
Radomlje (loan)	Total		62	12	3	1	–		65	13
Hajduk Split	2024–25	Croatian Football League	0	0	1	0	0	0	1	0
Željezničar	2024–25	Bosnian Premier League	14	5	5	5	–		19	10
Željezničar	2025–26	Bosnian Premier League	11	1	0	0	2	0	13	1
Željezničar	2026–27	Bosnian Premier League	12	0	0	0	–		12	0
Željezničar	Total		37	6	5	5	2	0	44	11
Career total			127	19	9	6	2	0	138	25

=== International ===
Appearances and goals by national team and year
National team	Year	Apps	Goals
Bosnia and Herzegovina
Bosnia and Herzegovina	2024	1	0
Total		1	0

== Honours ==
Zrinjski Mostar

- Bosnian Premier League: 2021–22
