= Vedad Muftić =

Bosnian footballer (born 2001)

Personal information
- Date of birth: 25 October 2001 (age 25)
- Place of birth: Sarajevo, Bosnia and Herzegovina
- Height: 1.84 m (6 ft 0 in)
- Position: Goalkeeper

Team information
- Current team: AEK Larnaca
- Number: 1

Youth career
- 2013–2020: Željezničar

Senior career*
Years	Team	Apps	(Gls)
2020–2026	Željezničar	116	(0)
2026–	AEK Larnaca	0	(0)
- * Club domestic league appearances and goals as of 25 May 2026

Vedad Muftić (born 25 October 2001) is a Bosnian professional footballer who plays as a goalkeeper for Cypriot First Division club AEK Larnaca.

Born in Sarajevo, he started his professional career at hometown club Željezničar, debuting in 2021. He joined AEK Larnaca in 2026.

== Club career ==
=== Željezničar ===
Muftić made his debut for hometown club Željezničar in a 2–1 loss to Olimpik on 25 April 2021. He kept his first clean sheet for the club on 30 May 2021, a 3–0 victory against Krupa to finish off the 2020–21 season.

Muftić signed his first professional contract with Željezničar in July 2021. On 25 April 2023, he signed a two-year contract renewal, keeping him at the club until at least July 2025. In August 2024, he signed a contract renewal keeping him at the club until June 2026.

On 30 August 2025, Muftić made his 100th appearance for Željezničar in a goalless away draw against Sloga Doboj. Deciding not to further extend his contract with Željezničar, he played his last game for the club against cross-town rivals Sarajevo on 25 May 2026.

=== AEK Larnaca ===
In June 2026, Muftić joined Cypriot First Division side AEK Larnaca on a two-year deal.

== Career statistics ==
As of match played 25 May 2026

Appearances and goals by club, season and competition
Club	Season	League	League		Cup		Europe		Total	
Club	Season	League	Apps	Goals	Apps	Goals	Apps	Goals	Apps	Goals
Željezničar	2020–21	Bosnian Premier League	2	0	0	0	0	0	2	0
Željezničar	2021–22	Bosnian Premier League	2	0	2	0	—		4	0
Željezničar	2022–23	Bosnian Premier League	15	0	3	0	—		18	0
Željezničar	2023–24	Bosnian Premier League	33	0	0	0	1	0	34	0
Željezničar	2024–25	Bosnian Premier League	31	0	3	0	—		34	0
Željezničar	2025–26	Bosnian Premier League	33	0	4	0	2	0	39	0
Željezničar	Total		116	0	12	0	3	0	131	0
AEK Larnaca	2026–27	Cypriot First Division	0	0	0	0	0	0	0	0
Career total			116	0	12	0	3	0	131	0
