= Sulejman Krpić =

Bosnian footballer (born 1991)

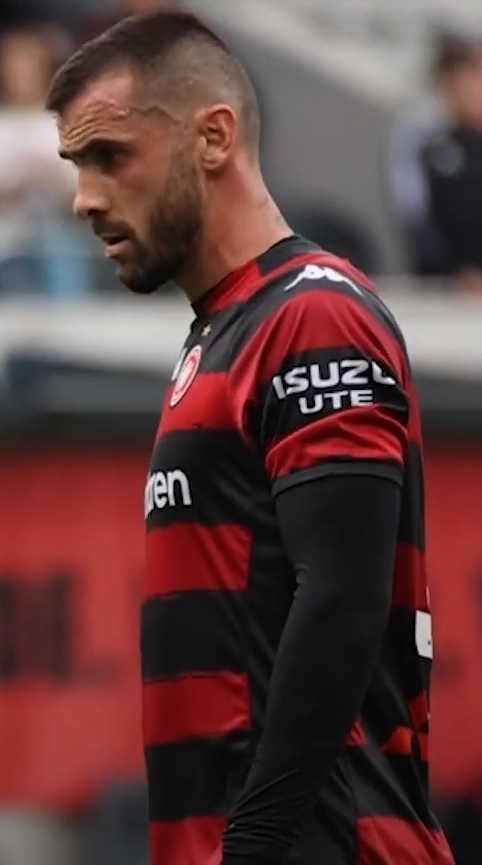
- Krpić playing for Western Sydney Wanderers in 2022

Personal information
- Date of birth: 1 January 1991 (age 35)
- Place of birth: Brčko, SFR Yugoslavia
- Height: 1.87 m (6 ft 2 in)
- Position: Striker

Team information
- Current team: Stupčanica

Youth career
- 2001–2006: Hajduk Orašje
- 2006–2008: Orašje
- 2008–2010: Dinamo Zagreb
- 2010–2011: LASK

Senior career*
Years	Team	Apps	(Gls)
2011	LASK II	11	(5)
2011	Orašje	6	(4)
2012	Sarajevo	22	(2)
2013–2014	Metalac Gornji Milanovac	13	(3)
2014–2017	Sloboda Tuzla	87	(28)
2017	AIK	6	(0)
2017–2018	Sloboda Tuzla	13	(4)
2018	Tractor	5	(0)
2018–2020	Željezničar	50	(28)
2020	Suwon Samsung Bluewings	13	(2)
2020–2021	Astra Giurgiu	17	(2)
2021–2022	Tuzla City	30	(14)
2022–2023	Western Sydney Wanderers	13	(2)
2023–2026	Željezničar	91	(23)
2026–	Stupčanica	0	(0)

International career
2009–2011	Bosnia and Herzegovina U19	4	(0)
2021	Bosnia and Herzegovina	1	(0)
- * Club domestic league appearances and goals as of 25 May 2026

Sulejman Krpić (born 1 January 1991) is a Bosnian professional footballer who plays as a striker for First League of FBiH club Stupčanica.

== Club career ==
=== Early career ===
Born in Brčko, SR Bosnia and Herzegovina, back then still within SFR Yugoslavia, Krpić played with the youth team of Orašje where he became noticed for being the top scorer in the team and scoring in the Bosnian Youth Cup final against Bosna Visoko which Orašje won by 4–1. He joined the Dinamo Zagreb youth team in 2008. In April 2009, while he was 18 years old, he signed a 10-year contract with Dinamo. He stayed with the Croatian giants for two years, playing in their youth and reserves teams. In 2010, he moved to Austria joining LASK juniors team competing in the 2010–11 Austrian Regional League Central, better known as Regionalliga, Austrian third level.

In the summer of 2011, Krpić returned to Bosnia and Herzegovina, and after a half-season with Orašje, he signed a one-year contract with Sarajevo the during winter-break, and debuted in the second half of the 2011–12 league season. A year later, Krpić left Sarajevo and moved to neighbor Serbia where he played in the second level, Serbian First League, with Metalac Gornji Milanovac.

=== Sloboda Tuzla ===
At the end of the 2012–13 season, Krpić left Metalac and joined Sloboda Tuzla, then playing in the second level but clearly aiming to return to the top level. Sloboda had brought coach Miroslav Blažević whose first signings were Edin Husić and Krpić. They achieved promotion that year by winning the 2013–14 First League of FBiH.

Krpić stayed with Sloboda the following seasons, being a member of the squad for the 2015–16 season, just two years after their promotion, when they finished second in the league and were cup finalists. At the start of that season, Krpić left Sloboda and signed a three-year contract with Croatian top-flight side Istra 1961, however, he left Istra shortly afterward, without even debuting for them in any competition, and during the following winter-break he rejoined Sloboda.

Halfway through the 2016–17 season, Krpić led the scoring table in the Bosnian Premier League, subsequently attracting interest from abroad. On 3 March 2017, it was announced that he had signed a three-year contract with Swedish first-tier side AIK, a fee rumoured to be €150,000, upon recommendation from the club's assistant manager Nebojša Novaković. He left the club the same year and came back to Sloboda. After one season in Sloboda, Krpić left and joined Iranian club Tractor.

=== Željezničar ===
At the end of the season, Krpić left Tractor, came back to Bosnia and Herzegovina and signed a two-year contract with Željezničar. In the 2018–19 season, he finished as the league's top goalscorer, scoring 16 goals in 32 league games for Željezničar.

Krpić scored two goals in Željezničar's 5–2 Sarajevo derby win against his former club FK Sarajevo on 31 August 2019. On 30 November 2019, he scored another goal against Sarajevo in the city derby, this time in Željezničar's 3–1 away league win.

=== Later career ===
On 3 January 2020, Krpić signed a contract with South Korean K League 1 club Suwon Samsung Bluewings for a €230.000 transfer fee. He made his official debut on 19 February 2020, in an AFC Champions League match against Vissel Kobe. He left Suwon on 7 November 2020 after his contract with the club expired.

Krpić joined Romanian Liga I club Astra Giurgiu in December 2020. He made his debut in a league game against Argeș Pitești on 6 February 2021. He scored his first goal for Astra against Academica Clinceni in a league game on 27 February 2021.

On 28 June 2021, Krpić signed a three-year contract with Tuzla City. He debuted and scored his first goal for Tuzla City on 19 July 2021, in a league game against Sarajevo. Following Tuzla City, he played for Australian side Western Sydney Wanderers.

==== Return to Željezničar ====
Krpić returned to Željezničar in February 2023, signing a two-year deal. He made his second debut for Željezničar in a Bosnian Cup game against Leotar on 18 February. He scored his first goal for the club since returning on 25 February, in a league game against Igman Konjic.

On 12 May 2023, Krpić scored the equaliser 6 minutes into stoppage time against rivals Sarajevo in the Sarajevo derby, helping his team to narrowly escape defeat in a 2–2 draw. He made his 100th appearance for Željezničar in the Sarajevo derby on 14 April 2024. In August 2024, he signed a one-year contract renewal, keeping him at the club until at least July 2025. He scored his 50th goal for Željezničar with a hat-trick in a 4–1 home win over GOŠK Gabela on 9 December 2024.

In January 2025, Krpić signed another contract renewal, keeping him at the club until June 2026. On 28 March 2025, he scored a brace in a 3–2 home win against Posušje.

Krpić left Željezničar following the end of the 2025–26 season. Altogether, he scored 59 goals in 165 matches for Željezničar across his two spells, making him the eleventh-highest goalscorer in the club's history.

== International career ==
Krpić was part of the Bosnia and Herzegovina U19 national team in 2009 and 2011. He made 4 appearances for the national team but did not score a goal.

In December 2021, Krpić received his first senior call-up, for a friendly game against the United States, and debuted in that game on 18 December.

== Career statistics ==
=== Club ===
As of match played 25 May 2026

Appearances and goals by club, season and competition
Club	Season	League			Cup		Continental		Total	
Club	Season	Division	Apps	Goals	Apps	Goals	Apps	Goals	Apps	Goals
LASK Linz II	2010–11	Regionalliga	11	5	0	0	—		11	5
Orašje	2011–12	First League of FBiH	6	4	—		—		6	4
Sarajevo	2011–12	Bosnian Premier League	14	2	0	0	0	0	14	2
Sarajevo	2012–13	Bosnian Premier League	8	0	0	0	0	0	8	0
Sarajevo	Total		22	2	0	0	0	0	22	2
Metalac Gornji Milanovac	2012–13	Serbian First League	13	3	0	0	—		13	3
Sloboda Tuzla	2013–14	First League of FBiH	14	10	—		—		14	10
Sloboda Tuzla	2014–15	Bosnian Premier League	13	3	0	0	—		13	3
Sloboda Tuzla	2015–16	Bosnian Premier League	25	4	6	3	—		31	7
Sloboda Tuzla	2016–17	Bosnian Premier League	18	11	1	0	1	0	20	11
Sloboda Tuzla	Total		70	28	7	3	1	0	78	31
AIK	2017	Allsvenskan	6	0	0	0	0	0	6	0
Sloboda Tuzla	2017–18	Bosnian Premier League	13	4	2	1	—		15	5
Tractor	2017–18	Persian Gulf Pro League	5	0	0	0	5	0	10	0
Željezničar	2018–19	Bosnian Premier League	32	16	0	0	4	3	36	19
Željezničar	2019–20	Bosnian Premier League	18	12	0	0	—		18	12
Željezničar	Total		50	28	0	0	4	3	54	31
Suwon Samsung Bluewings	2020	K League 1	13	2	2	0	1	0	16	2
Astra Giurgiu	2020–21	Liga I	17	2	5	2	—		22	4
Tuzla City	2021–22	Bosnian Premier League	30	14	4	1	—		34	15
Western Sydney Wanderers	2022–23	A-League Men	13	2	0	0	—		0	0
Željezničar	2022–23	Bosnian Premier League	15	2	4	0	—		19	2
Željezničar	2023–24	Bosnian Premier League	28	8	1	0	4	1	33	9
Željezničar	2024–25	Bosnian Premier League	29	11	6	3	—		35	14
Željezničar	2025–26	Bosnian Premier League	19	2	3	0	2	1	24	3
Željezničar	Total		91	23	14	3	6	2	111	28
Stupčanica	2026–27	First League of FBiH	0	0	0	0	—		0	0
Career total			359	116	34	10	17	5	410	131

=== International ===
Appearances and goals by national team and year
National team	Year	Apps	Goals
Bosnia and Herzegovina	2021	1	0
Total		1	0

== Honours ==
Sloboda Tuzla

- First League of FBiH: 2013–14

Individual

- Bosnian Premier League top scorer: 2018–19
