= Mustafa Šukilović =

Bosnian footballer (born 2003)

Personal information
- Date of birth: 1 January 2003 (age 23)
- Place of birth: Bijeljina, Bosnia Hercegovina
- Height: 1.86 m (6 ft 1 in)
- Position: Centre-back

Team information
- Current team: Radnik Bijeljina
- Number: 22

Youth career
- –2020: Radnik Bijeljina

Senior career*
Years	Team	Apps	(Gls)
2020–2021	Radnik Bijeljina	1	(0)
2021–2024	Tuzla City	74	(1)
2024–2026	Željezničar	29	(2)
2026–	Radnik Bijeljina	7	(0)

International career
2019	Bosnia and Herzegovina U17	3	(0)
2020	Bosnia and Herzegovina U18	2	(0)
2021–2022	Bosnia and Herzegovina U19	13	(0)
2022–2023	Bosnia and Herzegovina U21	8	(0)
- * Club domestic league appearances and goals as of 17 October 2026

Mustafa Šukilović (born 1 January 2003) is a Bosnian professional footballer who plays as a centre-back for Bosnian Premier League club Radnik Bijeljina.

== Club career ==
Šukilović spent his youth years with hometown club Radnik Bijeljina, and also started his senior career there. He then spent three years with Tuzla City. He extended his contract in 2023, though the team struggled in the league. Šukilović, the team captain at the time, terminated his contract with Tuzla City as the team was relegated from the Bosnian Premier League in June 2024.

On 9 September 2024, Šukilović joined Željezničar on a contract until June 2025, with the option of extending for a further year. He made his debut in a 1–0 home win over Posušje on 29 September. He scored his first goal for Željezničar in a 2–0 away win against Igman Konjic on 22 November 2024.

In July 2026, Šukilović returned to Radnik.

== International career ==
Šukilović has represented Bosnia and Herzegovina on various youth levels.

== Career statistics ==
=== Club ===
As of match played 27 October 2026

Appearances and goals by club, season and competition
Club	Season	League			Bosnian Cup		Continental		Total	
Club	Season	Division	Apps	Goals	Apps	Goals	Apps	Goals	Apps	Goals
Radnik Bijeljina	2020–21	Bosnian Premier League	1	0	0	0	—		1	0
Tuzla City	2021–22	Bosnian Premier League	24	0	3	0	—		4	0
Tuzla City	2022–23	Bosnian Premier League	28	0	4	0	3 (Note: Appearances in UEFA Europa Conference League)	1	35	1
Tuzla City	2023–24	Bosnian Premier League	22	1	1	0	—		22	1
Tuzla City	Total		74	1	8	0	3	1	85	2
Željezničar	2024–25	Bosnian Premier League	19	2	6	0	—		25	2
Željezničar	2025–26	Bosnian Premier League	10	0	2	0	0	0	12	0
Željezničar	Total		29	2	8	0	0	0	37	2
Radnik Bijeljina	2026–27	Bosnian Premier League	7	0	1	0	—		8	0
Career total			111	3	17	0	3	1	131	4
