= Edwin Odinaka =

Nigerian footballer (born 2003)

Personal information
- Date of birth: 28 November 2003 (age 22)
- Place of birth: Port Harcourt, Nigeria
- Height: 1.77 m (5 ft 10 in)
- Position: Right wing-back

Team information
- Current team: Bukovyna Chernivtsi
- Number: 18

Senior career*
Years	Team	Apps	(Gls)
2023–2024	Stupčanica	44	(0)
2024–2026	Željezničar	53	(3)
2026–	Bukovyna Chernivtsi	0	(0)
- * Club domestic league appearances and goals as of 25 May 2026

Edwin Odinaka (born 28 November 2003) is a Nigerian professional footballer who plays as a right wing-back for Ukrainian Premier League club Bukovyna Chernivtsi.

== Career ==
=== Stupčanica ===
In January 2023, Odinaka signed his first professional contract with Bosnian club Stupčanica. He debuted in a 0–0 away draw against Mladost Doboj Kakanj on 5 March 2023.

=== Željezničar ===
On 1 July 2024, Odinaka joined Bosnian Premier League club Željezničar on a contract until June 2026, with the option of extending for a further year. He made his debut and scored the equaliser in Željezničar's 2–1 away win over Velež Mostar on 10 August 2024. He scored his first goal of the 2025–26 season in a 3–0 away win against Radnik Bijeljina on 11 April 2026. Odinaka's contract expired in June, and he subsequently left Željezničar after opting not to extend it.

=== Bukovyna Chernivtsi ===
In June 2026, Odinaka signed a two-year contract with newly promoted Ukrainian Premier League side Bukovyna Chernivtsi.

== Career statistics ==
As of match played 25 May 2026

Appearances and goals by club, season and competition
Club	Season	League	League		Cup		Europe		Total	
Club	Season	League	Apps	Goals	Apps	Goals	Apps	Goals	Apps	Goals
Stupčanica	2022–23	First League of FBiH	14	0	–		–		14	0
Stupčanica	2023–24	First League of FBiH	30	0	2	0	–		32	0
Stupčanica	Total		44	0	2	0	–		46	0
Željezničar	2024–25	Bosnian Premier League	23	1	5	0	–		28	1
Željezničar	2025–26	Bosnian Premier League	30	2	4	0	0	0	34	2
Željezničar	Total		53	3	9	0	0	0	62	3
Bukovyna Chernivtsi	2026–27	Ukrainian Premier League	0	0	0	0	–		0	0
Career total			97	3	11	0	0	0	108	3
