= Ivan Đorić =

Serbian footballer (born 1995)

Personal information
- Date of birth: 7 July 1995 (age 31)
- Place of birth: Niš, FR Yugoslavia
- Height: 1.83 m (6 ft 0 in)
- Position: Defensive midfielder

Team information
- Current team: Rudeš
- Number: 24

Youth career
- Sinđelić Niš
- Red Star Belgrade
- BSK Borča
- Ventspils

Senior career*
Years	Team	Apps	(Gls)
2015	Ventspils	7	(0)
2016	Sion	0	(0)
2016	→ Stade Nyonnais (loan)		
2016	→ Radnik Surdulica (loan)	7	(0)
2017	Radnik Surdulica	7	(0)
2017–2019	OFK Bačka	44	(2)
2019–2020	Napredak Kruševac	33	(3)
2020–2021	Voždovac	13	(0)
2021	Iskra Danilovgrad	13	(0)
2021–2022	Mosta	13	(0)
2022	Radnik Bijeljina	13	(1)
2022–2023	Sloga Meridian	29	(1)
2023–2024	Igman Konjic	30	(0)
2024	Željezničar	4	(0)
2024–2025	Igman Konjic	27	(1)
2025–	Rudeš	29	(0)
- * Club domestic league appearances and goals as of 16 June 2026

Ivan Đorić (Serbian Cyrillic: Иван Ђорић; born 7 July 1995) is a Serbian professional footballer who plays as a defensive midfielder for Croatian 1. NL club Rudeš.

== Club career ==
Born in Niš, Đorić passed the Red Star Belgrade youth academy, being also with BSK Borča for a period. In 2015, he played for Ventspils along with other Serbian footballer Nikola Boranijašević.

In early 2016, Sion sent Đorić on loan to Stade Nyonnais. He was also loaned to Radnik Surdulica in the summer of the same year. At the beginning of 2017, Đorić permanently moved to the club, and signed a three-year professional contract with Radnik Surdulica. In the summer of 2017, he moved to OFK Bačka, making his debut for the club in a match against Vojvodina.
