= Toni Trogrančić =

Footballer (born 2000)

Personal information
- Full name: Antonio Trogrančić
- Date of birth: 1 January 2000 (age 26)
- Place of birth: Bad Aibling, Germany
- Height: 1.76 m (5 ft 9 in)
- Position: Midfielder

Team information
- Current team: SV Lafnitz
- Number: 24

Youth career
- –2017: Bayern Munich
- 2017: Ajax
- 2017–2019: Dinamo Zagreb

Senior career*
Years	Team	Apps	(Gls)
2019–2021	1860 Munich II	18	(3)
2021–2023	Wacker Burghausen	27	(1)
2023–	SV Lafnitz	2	(0)
- * Club domestic league appearances and goals as of 26 May 2024

Antonio Trogrančić (born 1 January 2000) is a footballer who plays as a midfielder for SV Lafnitz. Born in Germany, he was a Croatia youth international.

== Early life ==
Trogrančić is a native of Rosenheim, Germany.

== Club career ==
Trogrančić started his career with German Bundesliga side FC Bayern, where he was regarded as a prospect and received comparisons to Germany international Toni Kroos.

== International career ==
Trogrančić represented Croatia internationally at youth level.

== Style of play ==
Trogrančić mainly operates as an attacking midfielder, winger, or striker, and is two-footed.

== Personal life ==
Trogrančić was born to a Bosnia and Herzegovina-born father and a Croatia-born mother.
