= 2026–27 Wisła Płock season =

Wisła Płock
2026–27 season
- Stadium: Kazimierz Górski Stadium
- Ekstraklasa: Pre-season
- Polish Cup: Pre-season
Home colours	Away colours

The 2026–27 season is the 80th season in the history of Wisła Płock and their second consecutive season in the Ekstraklasa. The club will also compete in the Polish Cup.

== Transfers ==
=== In ===
Pos.	Player	Transferred from	Fee	Date	Source
MF	(Belarus) Gleb Kuchko	(Poland) Miedź Legnica	Loan return	30 June 2026	
DF	(Poland) Marcin Flis	(Poland) Pogoń Siedlce	Free	1 July 2026	
DF	(Kosovo) Dion Gallapeni	(Poland) Widzew Łódź	Loan made permanent	1 July 2026	
MF	(Poland) Michał Król	(Poland) Motor Lublin	Free	1 July 2026	
MF	(Slovenia) Žan Rogelj	(Belgium) Charleroi	Loan made permanent	1 July 2026	

=== Out ===
Pos.	Player	Transferred to	Fee	Date	Source
MF	(Poland) Dominik Kun	(Poland) Arka Gdynia	Free	1 July 2026	
MF	(Portugal) Tomás Tavares			1 July 2026	

== Pre-season and friendlies ==
20 June 2026 Friendly	Pogoń Siedlce (Poland)	v	(Poland) Wisła Płock
14:00

27 June 2026 Friendly	Wisła Płock (Poland)	2–1	(Poland) Pogoń Grodzisk Mazowiecki
11:00	10'; 54' (o.g.)		82' (pen.)

4 July 2026 Friendly	Wisła Płock (Poland)	3–0	(Poland) Polonia Warsaw
12:00	Hamulić 41'; Kun 75'; Błaszkiewicz 86'

17 July 2026 Friendly	Wisła Płock (Poland)	3–0	(Poland) ŁKS Łódź
14:00

== Competitions ==
=== Overall record ===
Competition	First match	Last match	Starting round	Record							
Competition	First match	Last match	Starting round	Pld	W	D	L	GF	GA	GD	Win %
Ekstraklasa	24–27 July 2026		Matchday 1	0	0	0	0	0	0	+0	—
Polish Cup				0	0	0	0	0	0	+0	—
Total				0	0	0	0	0	0	+0	—

Source: Competitions

=== Ekstraklasa ===
Pos	Team	Pld	W	D	L	GF	GA	GD	Pts	Qualification or relegation
1	Zagłębie Lubin	1	1	0	0	2	0	+2	3	Qualification for the Champions League play-off round
2	Wisła Płock	1	1	0	0	2	1	+1	3	Qualification for the Champions League second qualifying round
2	Górnik Zabrze	1	1	0	0	2	1	+1	3	Qualification for the Europa League second qualifying round
2	Radomiak Radom	1	1	0	0	2	1	+1	3	Qualification for the Conference League second qualifying round
2	Wisła Kraków	1	1	0	0	2	1	+1	3	

Updated to match(es) played on 27 July 2026. Source: ekstraklasa.org 90minut.pl
Rules for classification: 1) Points; 2) Head-to-head points; 3) Head-to-head goal difference; 4) Goal difference; 5) Goals scored; 6) Number of wins; 7) Number of away wins; 8) Lower number of points based on yellow and red cards (red card = 3 points, yellow card = 1 point, sending-off = 3 points - including 1 point for first yellow card); 9) Fairplay ranking; 10) Draw.
(Note: Head-to-head record is used only after all the matches between the teams in question have been played)

==== Matches ====
26 July 2026 1	Raków Częstochowa	1–2	Wisła Płock	Częstochowa
14:45	Makuch 68' (pen.)		Flis 37'; Rogelj 49'
