= Aleksandar Boljević =

Montenegrin footballer (born 1995)

Aleksandar Boljević Александар Бољевић
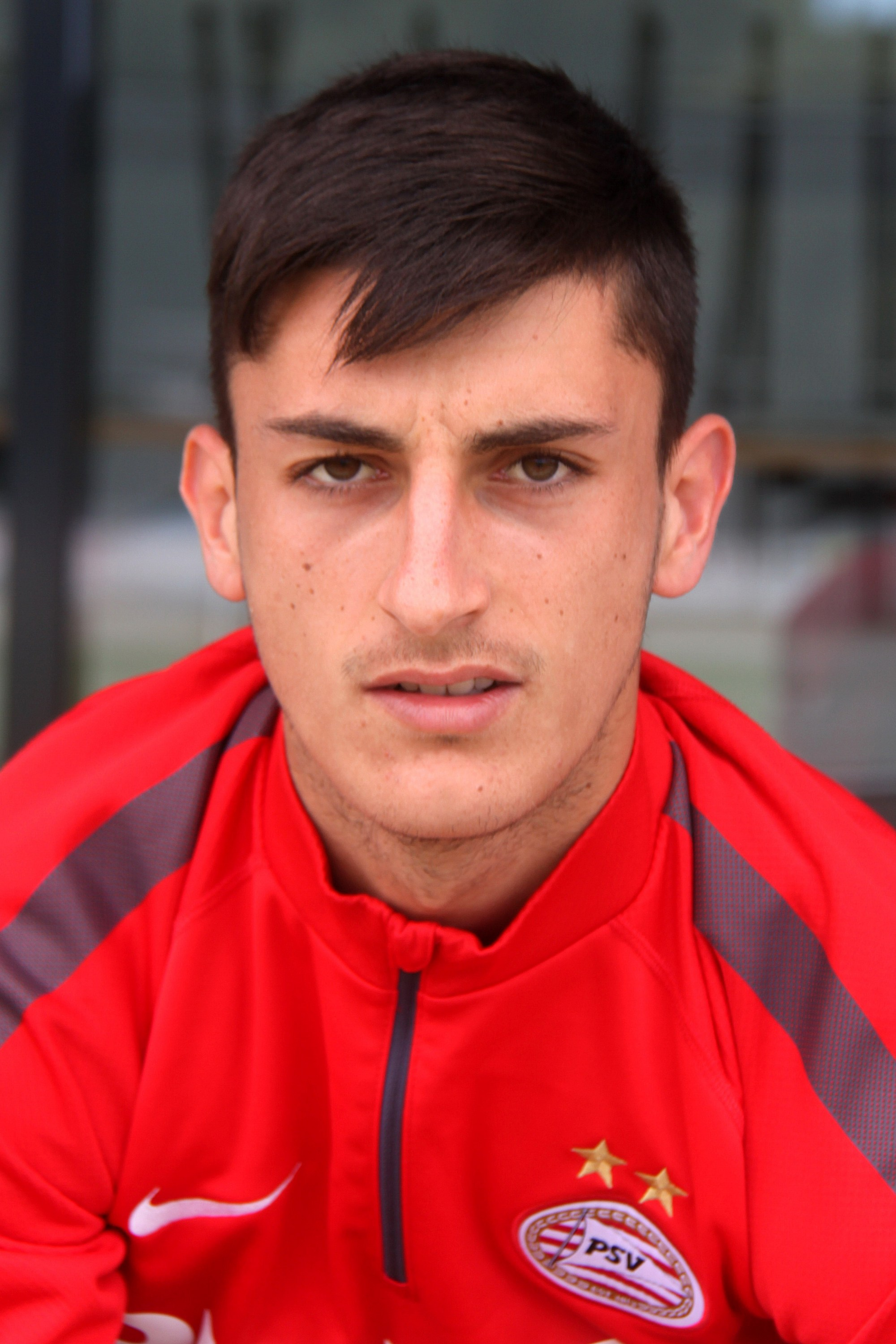
- Boljević with PSV in 2014

Personal information
- Date of birth: 12 December 1995 (age 30)
- Place of birth: Podgorica, Montenegro, FR Yugoslavia
- Height: 1.83 m (6 ft 0 in)
- Position: Winger

Team information
- Current team: Sogdiana
- Number: 7

Youth career
- 2007–2011: Zeta

Senior career*
Years	Team	Apps	(Gls)
2011–2014	Zeta	43	(8)
2014–2016	PSV	1	(0)
2014–2016	Jong PSV	71	(13)
2016–2019	Waasland-Beveren	98	(7)
2019–2023	Standard Liège	34	(3)
2021	→ Eupen (loan)	7	(0)
2023	Hapoel Tel Aviv	14	(0)
2023–2026	Željezničar	59	(16)
2026–	Sogdiana	10	(1)

International career
2013	Montenegro U21	1	(0)
2013–2021	Montenegro	26	(2)
- * Club domestic league appearances and goals as of 2 May 2026

Aleksandar Boljević (Serbian Cyrillic: Александар Бољевић; born 12 December 1995) is a Montenegrin professional footballer who plays as a winger for Uzbekistan Super League club Sogdiana.

He also played for the Montenegro national team.

== Club career ==
=== Zeta ===
Boljević made his debut for Zeta in the Montenegrin First League in 2011 at the age of 15. His extraordinary talent cemented his place in Zeta's regular starting lineup. Already at the age of 16, Boljević played a key role in Zeta's campaign in the 2012–13 UEFA Europa League qualifying phase. He appeared in all eight Europa League qualifying games that year, making assists against JJK and Sarajevo before playing two matches against PSV Eindhoven. Even though Zeta lost by a staggering 0–14 on aggregate, PSV recognized Boljević and subsequently signed him on a pre-contract, which transferred him to PSV in January 2014.

=== PSV ===
In his time at PSV, Boljević mostly played for the reserves, Jong PSV. While he did impress while playing for Jong PSV, it wasn't enough for manager Phillip Cocu to call Boljević up more regularly for the first team. He made only one appearance for the first team. On 9 August 2016, it became clear that Boljević had signed a contract with Belgian club Waasland-Beveren. He had only one season remaining on his contract with PSV.

=== Belgium ===
On 9 August 2016, Boljević signed with Belgian First Division A side Waasland-Beveren. During the 2016–17 season, he made 21 appearances for Beveren, recording 4 assists and no goals.

In June 2019, Boljević joined Standard Liège. In January 2021, he was loaned to Eupen until the end of the season.

=== Hapoel Tel Aviv ===
On 26 January 2023, Boljević moved to Israeli Premier League club Hapoel Tel Aviv until the end of the 2022–23 season.

=== Željezničar ===
On 29 September 2023, Boljević signed a two-year contract with Bosnian Premier League club Željezničar. On 27 October 2023, he made his league debut for Željezničar in a 2–0 away loss to Igman Konjic. Boljević scored his first goal for the club in a 2–1 away defeat to Zvijezda 09 on 10 March 2024.

Boljević scored his first goal of the 2024–25 season on 10 August 2024, the winner against Velež Mostar. On 25 October 2024, he scored a brace in a 2–0 home win against Radnik Bijeljina. On 9 December 2024, he received a straight red during a 4–1 home win over GOŠK Gabela.

In January 2025, Boljević signed a two-year contract renewal, keeping him at the club until at least July 2027. He finished the 2024–25 season as Željezničar's joint top scorer.

=== Sogdiana ===
On 13 January 2026, Boljević was signed by Uzbekistan Super League club Sogdiana for an undisclosed transfer fee.

== International career ==
In 2010, at the age of 14, Boljević represented Montenegro at the 2010 Summer Youth Olympics. He scored a goal against Zimbabwe in the group stage and another goal against Bolivia in the tournament's knockout stage. In August 2012, he participated in the Valeriy Lobanovskyi Memorial Tournament, where his team lost in the final to Slovakia on penalties and took home silver medals.

At 17 years of age, Boljević made his debut for the Montenegro national team on 17 November 2013, in a friendly game against Luxembourg. He has, as of March 2021, earned a total of 26 caps, scoring two goals.

== Honours ==
PSV

- Eredivisie: 2014–15
