= Cyrille Kpan =

Burkinabé footballer

Personal information
- Full name: Cyrille Dominique Kpan
- Date of birth: May 30, 1998 (age 28)
- Place of birth: Bouaflé, Ivory Coast
- Height: 1.74 m (5 ft 9 in)
- Position: Winger

Senior career*
Years	Team	Apps	(Gls)
2014–2016	USFA		
2016–2017	Kawkab Marrakech	0	(0)
2017–2018	Salitas FC		
2018–2019	Vitória Setúbal	0	(0)
2019–2021	Sertanense	29	(3)
2022	Neretvanac	15	(3)
2022–2025	Široki Brijeg	76	(6)

International career
2015	Burkina Faso	2	(0)
- * Club domestic league appearances and goals as of 4 December 2025

Cyrille Kpan (born 30 May 1998) is an Ivorian-born Burkinabé football winger.
