= Abdulmalik Al-Jaber =

Saudi Arabian footballer (born 2004)

Abdulmalik Al-Jaber عبدالملك الجابر
Personal information
- Full name: Abdulmalik Saleh Al-Jaber
- Date of birth: 7 January 2004 (age 22)
- Place of birth: Medina, Saudi Arabia
- Height: 1.78 m (5 ft 10 in)
- Position: Midfielder

Team information
- Current team: Al Qadsiah (on loan from Al-Nassr)
- Number: 18

Youth career
- –2023: Ohod
- 2023: Dinamo Zagreb

Senior career*
Years	Team	Apps	(Gls)
2023–2025	Željezničar	44	(4)
2025–	Al-Nassr	0	(0)
2026–	→ Al Qadsiah (loan)	2	(0)

International career
2022–2024	Saudi Arabia U20	1	(0)
2024–	Saudi Arabia U23	7	(3)
- * Club domestic league appearances and goals as of 30 October 2026

Abdulmalik Saleh Al-Jaber (Arabic: عبدالملك الجابر; born 7 January 2004) is a Saudi Arabian professional footballer who plays as a midfielder for Saudi Pro League club Al Qadsiah, on loan from Al-Nassr and the Saudi Arabia U23 national team.

== Club career ==
=== Željezničar ===
Al-Jaber signed his first professional contract with Bosnian Premier League club Željezničar. He made his debut in a 3–0 away loss against Sloga Meridian on 20 September 2023. He scored his first goal for Željezničar in a 2–1 away win against GOŠK Gabela on 27 April 2024.

Al-Jaber scored his first goal of the 2024–25 season in a 3–1 home win over Igman Konjic on 17 August 2024. In September 2024, he signed a one-year contract renewal, keeping him at the club until at least July 2026.

=== Al-Nassr ===
On 2 June 2025, Al-Jaber was signed by Al-Nassr on a four-year contract for an undisclosed transfer fee.

== International career ==
In June 2022, Al-Jaber took part in the Maurice Revello Tournament in France with the Saudi Arabia under-20 national team.

== Career statistics ==
=== Club ===
As of match played 25 May 2025

Appearances and goals by club, season and competition
Club	Season	League	League		Cup		Continental		Total	
Club	Season	League	Apps	Goals	Apps	Goals	Apps	Goals	Apps	Goals
Željezničar	2023–24	Bosnian Premier League	14	1	1	0	—		15	1
Željezničar	2024–25	Bosnian Premier League	30	3	3	0	—		33	3
Željezničar	Total		44	4	4	0	—		48	4
Al-Nassr	2025–26	Saudi Pro League	0	0	0	0	0	0	0	0
Career total			44	4	4	0	0	0	48	4

== Honours ==
Al-Nassr

- Saudi Pro League: 2025–26
