= Enes Alić =

Bosnian footballer (born 1999)

Personal information
- Date of birth: 3 September 1999 (age 27)
- Place of birth: Sarajevo, Bosnia and Herzegovina
- Height: 1.75 m (5 ft 9 in)
- Position: Left-back

Team information
- Current team: St Johnstone
- Number: 2

Youth career
- –2017: Bosna Visoko
- 2017–2018: Frýdek

Senior career*
Years	Team	Apps	(Gls)
2018–2019	SK Dětmarovice		
2019–2020	Fanna BK		
2020–2021	Mladost Doboj Kakanj	28	(4)
2021–2022	Domžale	47	(1)
2023–2024	Kisvárda	23	(0)
2024–2025	Varaždin	18	(0)
2025–2026	Željezničar	33	(2)
2026–	St Johnstone	10	(1)
- * Club domestic league appearances and goals as of 29 August 2026

Enes Alić (born 3 September 1999) is a Bosnian professional footballer who plays as a left-back for Scottish Premiership club St Johnstone.

== Career ==
On 30 January 2023, Alić joined Kisvárda in Hungary. He was signed by Croatian club Varaždin on 31 August 2024.

On 9 June 2025, Alić signed a two-year contract with Bosnian Premier League side Željezničar. He made his debut against Koper in a 2025–26 UEFA Conference League first qualifying round first leg on 10 July 2025. He scored his first goal for the club in a 1–0 league victory away against Posušje on 3 August 2025. He signed for Scottish Premiership side St Johnstone in August 2026.
