= Srđan Grabež =

Serbian footballer

Personal information
- Date of birth: 2 April 1991 (age 35)
- Place of birth: Apatin, SR Serbia, SFR Yugoslavia
- Height: 1.86 m (6 ft 1 in)
- Position: Left-back

Team information
- Current team: Sloga Doboj

Youth career
- Mladost Apatin

Senior career*
Years	Team	Apps	(Gls)
2007–2010	Mladost Apatin	24	(2)
2010–2012	Dubnica	70	(3)
2013–2015	Spartak Trnava	37	(0)
2015–2018	Bratstvo Prigrevica	10	(1)
2018	Elan	10	(1)
2018–2019	OFK Bačka	23	(2)
2019–2021	TSC	27	(2)
2021–2022	Javor Ivanjica	34	(2)
2023	Mladost Novi Sad	0	(0)
2023–2025	Sloga Doboj	30	(4)
2025	Radnik Bijeljina	13	(1)
2025–	Sloga Doboj	0	(0)
- * Club domestic league appearances and goals as of 1 June 2025

Srđan Grabež (Serbian Cyrillic: Срђан Грабеж; born 2 April 1991) is a Serbian footballer who plays as a left-back for Bosnian Premier League club Sloga Doboj .

== Club career ==
He started his career with Mladost Apatin in the Serbian First League. In July 2010, he was transferred to Slovak side Dubnica.

In February 2013, Grabež joined Spartak Trnava. He made his league debut for them against Nitra on 2 March 2013.

In summer 2016 he returned to Serbia and joined Bratstvo Prigrevica playing in third level, Serbian League Vojvodina.

On 18 August 2021, he signed a two-year contract with Javor Ivanjica after his transfer to Romanian club Miercurea Ciuc fell through.
