= Ante Hrkać =

Bosnian footballer

Personal information
- Date of birth: 11 March 1992 (age 34)
- Place of birth: Široki Brijeg, Bosnia and Herzegovina
- Height: 1.93 m (6 ft 4 in)
- Position: Defender

Team information
- Current team: Velež Mostar
- Number: 8

Youth career
- –2011: Široki Brijeg

Senior career*
Years	Team	Apps	(Gls)
2011–2013	GOŠK Gabela	34	(1)
2013	Branitelj	21	(0)
2014	Mayrhofen	11	(3)
2014–2015	Vitez	12	(0)
2015	Segesta	14	(1)
2016–2017	Lokomotiva	0	(0)
2016	→ Lučko (loan)	12	(0)
2016–2017	→ Čelik Zenica (loan)	18	(0)
2017–2018	Teuta Durrës	28	(3)
2018	Al-Qaisumah	0	(0)
2019–2020	Široki Brijeg	26	(1)
2020–2021	Novara	9	(0)
2021–2022	Mladost Lučani	23	(1)
2022	Tuzla City	11	(0)
2022–	Velež Mostar	96	(4)
- * Club domestic league appearances and goals as of 19 September 2026

Ante Hrkać (born 11 March 1992) is a Bosnian professional footballer who plays as a defender for Bosnian Premier League club Velež Mostar.

== Club career ==
In the first half year of 2014, Hrkać had a spell at Austrian lower league side SVG Mayrhofen. In 2018, he signed for Saudi Arabian club Al-Qaisumah while apparently still under contract with Albanian side Teuta. He returned to hometown and his former youth club Široki Brijeg in January 2019.

On 18 August 2020, he signed a 2-year contract with Italian club Novara.

== Career statistics ==
=== Club ===
As of match played 19 September 2026

Appearances and goals by club, season and competition
Club	Season	League			National cup (Note: Includes Bosnian Cup, Albanian Cup, Serbian Cup, Croatian Cup)		Continental		Total	
Club	Season	Division	Apps	Goals	Apps	Goals	Apps	Goals	Apps	Goals
GOŠK Gabela	2011–12	Bosnian Premier League	24	0	—		—		24	0
GOŠK Gabela	2012–13	Bosnian Premier League	10	1	3	0	—		13	1
GOŠK Gabela	Total		34	1	3	0	—		37	1
Branitelj	2012–13	First League of FBiH	11	0	—		—		11	0
Branitelj	2013–14	First League of FBiH	10	0	1	0	—		11	0
Branitelj	Total		21	0	1	0	—		22	0
Vitez	2014–15	Bosnian Premier League	12	0	3	0	—		15	0
Segesta	2015–16	Prva NL	14	1	1	0	—		15	1
Lučko (loan)	2015–16	Prva NL	12	0	—		—		12	0
Čelik Zenica (loan)	2016–17	Bosnian Premier League	18	0	—		—		18	0
Teuta	2017–18	Kategoria Superiore	28	3	3	0	—		31	3
Široki Brijeg	2018–19	Bosnian Premier League	6	0	4	0	—		10	0
Široki Brijeg	2019–20	Bosnian Premier League	19	1	3	0	—		22	1
Široki Brijeg	2020–21	Bosnian Premier League	1	0	—		—		1	0
Široki Brijeg	Total		26	1	7	0	—		33	1
Novara	2020–21	Serie C	9	0	—		—		9	0
Mladost Lučani	2021–22	Serbian SuperLiga	23	1	1	0	—		24	1
Tuzla City	2022–23	Bosnian Premier League	11	0	1	0	4 (Note: Appearances in UEFA Europa Conference League)	0	16	0
Velež Mostar	2022–23	Bosnian Premier League	11	0	5	0	—		16	0
Velež Mostar	2023–24	Bosnian Premier League	28	3	3	1	—		31	4
Velež Mostar	2024–25	Bosnian Premier League	27	0	3	0	1	0	31	0
Velež Mostar	2025–26	Bosnian Premier League	24	1	7	1	—		31	2
Velež Mostar	2026–27	Bosnian Premier League	6	0	0	0	4	0	10	0
Velež Mostar	Total		96	4	18	2	5	0	119	6
Career total			304	11	38	2	9	0	351	13

== Honours ==
Široki Brijeg

- Bosnian Cup runner-up: 2018–19
