= Martin Mirchevski =

Macedonian footballer (born 1997)

Martin Mirchevski Мартин Мирчевски
Personal information
- Date of birth: 11 February 1997 (age 29)
- Place of birth: Bitola, Macedonia
- Height: 1.74 m (5 ft 9 in)
- Position: Winger

Team information
- Current team: Pelister
- Number: 10

Youth career
- –2014: Pelister

Senior career*
Years	Team	Apps	(Gls)
2014–2017	Pelister	21	(0)
2017	Pobeda	5	(0)
2018	Belasica	11	(10)
2018	Trepça '89	12	(6)
2019–2020	Belasica	34	(17)
2020–2021	Vardar	27	(8)
2021	Akademija Pandev	18	(16)
2022–2024	TSC	38	(11)
2024–2025	Željezničar	15	(0)
2025–2026	Sileks	32	(10)
2026–	Pelister		

International career
2013	Macedonia U17	3	(0)
2022	North Macedonia	1	(0)
- * Club domestic league appearances and goals as of 18 June 2026

Martin Mirchevski (Macedonian: Мартин Мирчевски; born 11 February 1997) is a Macedonian professional footballer who plays as a winger for Macedonian Second League club Pelister.

He has represented North Macedonia internationally.

== International career ==
On 20 November 2022, Mirchevski made his debut for the North Macedonia national team in a friendly game against Azerbaijan, coming in as a 83rd-minute substitute.

== Honours ==
Pelister

- Macedonian Cup: 2016–17

Belasica

- Macedonian Second League: 2017–18 (East), 2019–20 (East)
