= Stipo Marković =

Bosnian footballer (born 1993)

Personal information
- Date of birth: 3 December 1993 (age 32)
- Place of birth: Kiseljak, Bosnia and Herzegovina
- Height: 1.76 m (5 ft 9 in)
- Position: Left-back

Team information
- Current team: Segesta Sisak

Youth career
- 2009–2012: Široki Brijeg

Senior career*
Years	Team	Apps	(Gls)
2012–2019	Široki Brijeg	161	(1)
2019–2022	Lokomotiva	51	(1)
2022	Rudeš	8	(0)
2022–2024	Radomlje	67	(0)
2024–2025	Željezničar	26	(0)
2026–	Segesta Sisak	0	(0)

International career
2012–2013	Bosnia and Herzegovina U21	3	(0)
- * Club domestic league appearances and goals as of 3 March 2026

Stipo Marković (born 3 December 1993) is a Bosnian professional footballer who plays as a left-back for Croatian Second Football League side Segesta Sisak.

== Honours ==
Široki Brijeg

- Bosnian Cup: 2012–13, 2016–17
