= Damjan Krajišnik =

Bosnian footballer

Personal information
- Full name: Damjan Krajišnik
- Date of birth: 29 April 1997 (age 29)
- Place of birth: Bijeljina, Bosnia and Herzegovina
- Height: 1.77 m (5 ft 9 1/2 in)
- Position: Midfielder

Team information
- Current team: Kyzylzhar
- Number: 19

Youth career
- Radnik Bijeljina
- 2012–2015: Partizan

Senior career*
| Years | Team | Apps | (Gls) |
| 2016 | Sarajevo | 0 | (0) |
| 2016–2017 | Podrinje Janja | 28 | (3) |
| 2017–2018 | Zvijezda 09 | 41 | (15) |
| 2019 | Næstved | 3 | (0) |
| 2020 | Mladost Lučani | 26 | (2) |
| 2021–2022 | Metalac Gornji Milanovac | 51 | (8) |
| 2022–2023 | Radnički Kragujevac | 33 | (4) |
| 2023 | Železničar Pančevo | 8 | (0) |
| 2024 | PFC Lokomotiv Tashkent | 11 | (2) |
| 2024–2025 | Radnik Bijeljina | 44 | (6) |
| 2026– | Kyzylzhar | 15 | (1) |
- * Club domestic league appearances and goals as of 2 July 2026

Damjan Krajišnik (Serbian Cyrillic: Дамјан Крајишник; born 29 April 1997) is a Bosnian footballer who plays as a midfielder for Kazakhstan Premier League club Kyzylzhar.

== Club career ==
Born in Bijeljina, he started with the academy of local FK Radnik Bijeljina, from where he moved to the academy of neighbouring Serbian giants FK Partizan in 2012. In 2015, he had a half-season stint back in Bosnia with a powerhouse from their capital, FK Sarajevo, before starting his senior career by debuting for FK Podrinje Janja playing at the second Bosnian level, the First League of the Republika Srpska. In 2017, he signed with league rivals, ambitious FK Zvijezda 09, reaching with their promotion to the 2018–19 Premier League of Bosnia and Herzegovina. During the winter break of the season, he accepted an offer to move abroad again, this time signing with the Danish 1st Division side Næstved Boldklub. After exactly a year, he returned to former Yugoslavia and joined Serbian SuperLiga side FK Mladost Lučani.

On 15 January 2021, Krajišnik moved to fellow league club FK Metalac Gornji Milanovac.
