= 2023–24 FK Željezničar season =

Željezničar
2023–24 season
- Chairman: Edis Kovačević (until 2 November); Jusuf Tanović (from 22 November until 8 April); Oro Ibrišimović (from 8 April)
- Manager: Nermin Bašić (until 1 November); Haris Alihodžić (caretaker, from 1 to 7 November); Abdulhakeem Al-Tuwaijri (from 7 November to 2 January); Bruno Akrapović (from 8 January to 20 April); Dino Đurbuzović (caretaker, from 20 April)
- Stadium: Grbavica Stadium
- Premier League BiH: 6th
- Kup BiH: Round of 32
- UEFA Europa Conference League: Second qualifying round
- Top goalscorer: League: Sulejman Krpić (8); All: Sulejman Krpić (9)
- Highest home attendance: 13,157 vs Neftçi (27 July 2023)
- Lowest home attendance: 4,000 vs Posušje (26 November 2023) vs Sloga (4 November 2023)
- Average home league attendance: 7,057

The 2023–24 season was Željezničar's 103rd in existence and their 24th season in the Bosnian Premier League. Besides competing in the domestic league, the team also competed in the National Cup. Željezničar competed in the qualifications for the UEFA Europa Conference League as well.

The club finished in sixth place, while it got knocked out from the cup in the round of 32. Željezničar were eliminated from the Europa Conference League in the second qualifying round.

== Season review ==
=== June ===
On 12 June, Željezničar and its manager Nermin Bašić negotiated a two-year contract extension lasting until June 2025, with an option to stay at the club until at least 2026.

On 14 June, Željezničar and Aleksandar Kosorić negotiated a one-year contract extension lasting until June 2024.

On 16 June, Željezničar announced the signings of 28-year-old Ajdin Mulalić and 23-year-old Dražen Dubačkić.

On 19 June, Željezničar and Semir Štilić, Edin Cocalić, Dženan Haračić and Hamza Gasal negotiated one-year contract extensions lasting until June 2024.

On 20 June, Željezničar announced the signing of 30-year-old Edin Rustemović.

=== July ===
On 6 July, Željezničar announced the signing of 24-year-old Edin Biber.

On 8 July, Željezničar announced the signing of 26-year-old Haris Ovčina.

On 10 July, Željezničar announced the signing of 22-year-old Allyson Nascimento.

On 18 July, Željezničar announced the signing of 22-year-old Nikola Turanjanin.

=== August ===
On 8 August, Željezničar announced the signing of 26-year-old Mehmed Ćosić.

On 14 August, Željezničar announced the signing of 19-year-old Abdulmalik Al-Jaber.

=== September ===
On 13 September, Željezničar announced the signing of 26-year-old Vahid Selimović.

On 29 September, Željezničar announced the signing of 27-year-old Aleksandar Boljević.

=== October ===
On 12 October, Željezničar announced the departure of Omar Beća.

=== November ===
On 1 November, Željezničar announced the departure of manager Nermin Bašić.

On 4 November, Željezničar announced that its chairman of the board, Edis Kovačević, had resigned two days prior.

On 7 November, Željezničar announced Abdulhakeem Al-Tuwaijri as the club's new manager.

On 22 November, Jusuf Tanović was announced as the new chairman of the board of Željezničar.

=== December ===
On 21 December, Željezničar announced the departure of Edin Rustemović.

=== January ===
On 2 January, Željezničar announced the departure of manager Abdulhakeem Al-Tuwaijri.

On 5 January, Željezničar announced the signing of 21-year-old Harun Karić.

On 8 January, Željezničar announced the departure of Allyson Nascimento. The club also announced Bruno Akrapović as its new manager.

On 9 January, Željezničar announced the departure of Irfan Jašarević.

On 10 January, Željezničar announced the departure of Mehmed Ćosić.

On 16 January, Željezničar announced the signings of 24-year-old Stefan Radinović and 23-year-old Faris Zubanović.

On 17 January, Željezničar announced the signing of 27-year-old Samir Radovac.

On 19 January, Željezničar announced the departure of Benjamin Šehić.

On 22 January, Željezničar announced the signing of 27-year-old Amer Hiroš.

On 30 January, Željezničar announced the loan of 22-year-old Bismark Charles from CSKA Sofia for the remainder of the season.

=== February ===
On 1 February, Željezničar announced the loan of Ajdin Mulalić to Rogaška for the remainder of the season.

On 2 February, Željezničar announced the signings of 28-year-old Nemanja Cavnić, 29-year-old Antonio Pavić and 24-year-old Filip Dujmović.

On 5 February, Željezničar announced the departure of Dražen Dubačkić.

On 9 February, Željezničar announced the departures of Amar Musić and Nikola Turanjanin.

On 10 February, Željezničar announced the loan of 20-year-old Azur Mahmić from Velež Mostar for the remainder of the season.

On 16 February, Željezničar announced the departure of Hamza Gasal. The club also announced the signings of 24-year-old Adonis Bilal and 20-year-old Josip Mijić.

=== April ===
On 8 April, Oro Ibrišimović replaced Jusuf Tanović as chairman of the board of Željezničar.

On 20 April, Željezničar announced the departure of manager Bruno Akrapović and appointed Dino Đurbuzović as caretaker manager.

== First-team squad ==
N	Pos.	Nat.	Name	Age	EU	Since	App	Goals	Ends	Transfer fee	Notes
Goalkeepers
13	GK	(Bosnia and Herzegovina)	Vedad Muftić	24	Non-EU	2020	58	0	2025	Youth system	Originally from youth system
99	GK	(Bosnia and Herzegovina)	Filip Dujmović	27	Non-EU	2024	0	0	2024	Free	
Defenders
3	DF	(Montenegro)	Stefan Radinović	26	Non-EU	2024	12	0	2025	Free	
4	DF	(Montenegro)	Nemanja Cavnić	31	Non-EU	2024	14	0	2025	Free	
6	DF	(Bosnia and Herzegovina)	Edin Cocalić	38	Non-EU	2022	173	9	2024	Free	Originally from youth system
19	DF	(Bosnia and Herzegovina)	Amar Drina	24	Non-EU	2020	61	1	2025	Youth system	
24	DF	(Bosnia and Herzegovina)	Marin Galić	31	Non-EU	2022	80	2	2025	Free	
31	DF	(Luxembourg)	Vahid Selimović	29	EU	2023	14	1	2025	Free	
33	DF	(Croatia)	Antonio Pavić	31	EU	2024	48	0	2025	Free	
44	DF	(Bosnia and Herzegovina)	Azur Mahmić	23	Non-EU	2024	5	0	2024	Loan	On loan from Velež Mostar
Midfielders
5	MF	(Bosnia and Herzegovina)	Afan Fočo	18	Non-EU	2024	4	0	2026	Youth system	Originally from youth system
8	MF	(Bosnia and Herzegovina)	Nedim Mekić	31	Non-EU	2021	98	13	2024	Free	Originally from youth system
10	MF	(Bosnia and Herzegovina)	Amer Hiroš	30	Non-EU	2024	19	2	2024	Free	Originally from youth system
14	MF	(Bosnia and Herzegovina)	Semir Štilić	38	Non-EU	2019	180	49	2024	Free	Originally from youth system
17	MF	(Bosnia and Herzegovina)	Andrija Drljo	24	Non-EU	2023	42	1	2025	Free	
18	MF	(Croatia)	Josip Mijić	23	EU	2024	2	0	2025	Free	
20	MF	(Bosnia and Herzegovina)	Harun Karić	23	Non-EU	2024	12	0	2025	Free	
21	MF	(Bosnia and Herzegovina)	Adonis Bilal	27	Non-EU	2024	1	0	2024	Free	
22	MF	(Saudi Arabia)	Abdulmalik Al-Jaber	22	Non-EU	2023	15	1	2025	Free	
23	MF	(Montenegro)	Aleksandar Boljević	30	Non-EU	2023	18	3	2025	Free	
25	MF	(Bosnia and Herzegovina)	Edin Biber	27	Non-EU	2023	19	0	2024	Free	Originally from youth system
26	MF	(Ghana)	Joseph Amoah	24	Non-EU	2022	65	9	2024	Free	
27	MF	(Bosnia and Herzegovina)	Dženan Šabić	20	Non-EU	2022	5	0	2026	Youth system	Originally from youth system
77	MF	(Bosnia and Herzegovina)	Haris Ovčina	29	Non-EU	2023	28	0	2024	Free	Originally from youth system
88	MF	(Bosnia and Herzegovina)	Samir Radovac	30	Non-EU	2024	8	0	2025	Free	
Forwards
7	FW	(Bosnia and Herzegovina)	Sulejman Krpić (captain)	35	Non-EU	2023	106	42	2025	Free	
9	FW	(Bosnia and Herzegovina)	Dženan Haračić	32	Non-EU	2022	53	9	2024	Free	
11	FW	(Bosnia and Herzegovina)	Faris Zubanović	26	Non-EU	2024	7	2	2025	Free	Originally from youth system
15	FW	(Bosnia and Herzegovina)	Ernad Babaluk	20	Non-EU	2024	1	0	2025	Free	Originally from youth system
30	FW	(Ghana)	Bismark Charles	25	Non-EU	2024	3	0	2024	Loan	On loan from CSKA Sofia

- Source: fkzeljeznicar.ba
- Ordered by squad number.

== Transfers ==
=== In ===
No.	Pos.	Player	Transferred from	Fee	Date	Source
1	GK	(Bosnia and Herzegovina) Ajdin Mulalić	(Slovenia) Domžale	Free transfer	16 June 2023	
30	DF	(Bosnia and Herzegovina) Dražen Dubačkić	Stupčanica Olovo	Free transfer	16 June 2023	
44	MF	(Bosnia and Herzegovina) Edin Rustemović	(Serbia) Radnik Surdulica	Free transfer	20 June 2023	
18	MF	(Bosnia and Herzegovina) Edin Biber	Igman Konjic	Free transfer	6 July 2023	
77	MF	(Bosnia and Herzegovina) Haris Ovčina	Velež Mostar	Free transfer	8 July 2023	
20	MF	(Brazil) Allyson Nascimento	(Croatia) Neretvanac Opuzen	Free transfer	10 July 2023	
21	MF	(Bosnia and Herzegovina) Nikola Turanjanin	(Croatia) Slaven Belupo	Free transfer	18 July 2023	
97	DF	(Bosnia and Herzegovina) Mehmed Ćosić	(Serbia) Kolubara	Free transfer	8 August 2023	
22	MF	(Saudi Arabia) Abdulmalik Al-Jaber	(Croatia) Dinamo Zagreb U19	Free transfer	14 August 2023	
31	DF	(Luxembourg) Vahid Selimović	Free agent	Free transfer	13 September 2023	
23	MF	(Montenegro) Aleksandar Boljević	Free agent	Free transfer	29 September 2023	
20	MF	(Bosnia and Herzegovina) Harun Karić	(Croatia) Lokomotiva	Free transfer	5 January 2024	
3	DF	(Montenegro) Stefan Radinović	(Montenegro) Mladost DG	Free transfer	16 January 2024	
11	FW	(Bosnia and Herzegovina) Faris Zubanović	(Austria) Kapfenberg	Free transfer	16 January 2024	
88	MF	(Bosnia and Herzegovina) Samir Radovac	Free agent	Free transfer	17 January 2024	
10	MF	(Bosnia and Herzegovina) Amer Hiroš	(Croatia) Osijek	Free transfer	22 January 2024	
4	DF	(Montenegro) Nemanja Cavnić	(Denmark) HB Køge	Free transfer	2 February 2024	
33	DF	(Croatia) Antonio Pavić	(Poland) Zagłębie Sosnowiec	Free transfer	2 February 2024	
99	GK	(Bosnia and Herzegovina) Filip Dujmović	(Romania) Dinamo București	Free transfer	2 February 2024	
18	MF	(Croatia) Josip Mijić	(Croatia) Sloga Mravince	Free transfer	16 February 2024	
21	MF	(Bosnia and Herzegovina) Adonis Bilal	Željezničar Banja Luka	Free transfer	16 February 2024	
Total					€0	

Total expenditure: €0

=== Out ===
No.	Pos.	Player	Transferred to	Fee	Date	Source
20	MF	(Brazil) Clarismario Santos	(Cyprus) AEK Larnaca	End of contract	1 July 2023	
21	FW	(Bosnia and Herzegovina) Dženis Beganović	(Tajikistan) Istiklol	End of contract	1 July 2023	
25	FW	(Bosnia and Herzegovina) Benjamin Križevac	Slavija Sarajevo	Free transfer	1 July 2023	
40	GK	(Croatia) Josip Bender	Široki Brijeg	End of contract	1 July 2023	
12	GK	(Bosnia and Herzegovina) Tarik Karić	(Austria) Kapfenberg	Free transfer	5 July 2023	
18	MF	(Bosnia and Herzegovina) Armin Hodžić	(Turkey) Hatayspor	Free transfer	6 July 2023	
99	FW	(Bosnia and Herzegovina) Armin Hodžić	(North Macedonia) Shkupi	Contract termination	10 July 2023	
4	MF	(Bosnia and Herzegovina) Haris Hajdarević	(Serbia) Radnik Surdulica	Contract termination	12 July 2023	
23	MF	(Bosnia and Herzegovina) Omar Beća	Igman Konjic	Contract termination	12 October 2023	
44	MF	(Bosnia and Herzegovina) Edin Rustemović	(Serbia) Radnik Surdulica	Contract termination	21 December 2023	
20	MF	(Brazil) Allyson Nascimento	(Croatia) Radnik Križevci	Contract termination	8 January 2024	
33	DF	(Bosnia and Herzegovina) Irfan Jašarević	Tuzla City	End of contract	9 January 2024	
97	DF	(Bosnia and Herzegovina) Mehmed Ćosić	(Serbia) Radnički 1923	Contract termination	10 January 2024	
15	DF	(Bosnia and Herzegovina) Benjamin Šehić	TOŠK Tešanj	End of contract	19 January 2024	
30	DF	(Bosnia and Herzegovina) Dražen Dubačkić	(Serbia) Mladost Novi Sad	Contract termination	5 February 2024	
3	DF	(Bosnia and Herzegovina) Amar Musić	Radnik Hadžići	Contract termination	9 February 2024	
21	MF	(Bosnia and Herzegovina) Nikola Turanjanin	Laktaši	Contract termination	9 February 2024	
11	MF	(Bosnia and Herzegovina) Hamza Gasal	TOŠK Tešanj	Contract termination	16 February 2024	
Total					€0	

Total income: €0
Net: €0

=== Loans in ===
No.	Pos.	Player	Loaned from	Fee	Date	On loan until	Source
30	FW	(Ghana) Bismark Charles	(Bulgaria) CSKA Sofia	None	30 January 2024	30 June 2024	
44	DF	(Bosnia and Herzegovina) Azur Mahmić	Velež Mostar	None	10 February 2024	30 June 2024	
Total						€0	

=== Loans out ===
No.	Pos.	Player	Loaned to	Fee	Date	On loan until	Source
1	GK	(Bosnia and Herzegovina) Ajdin Mulalić	(Slovenia) Rogaška	None	1 February 2024	30 June 2024	
Total						€0	

== Coaching staff ==
Position	Name
Head coach	(Bosnia and Herzegovina) Dino Đurbuzović (caretaker)
Assistant coaches	(Bosnia and Herzegovina) Omer Joldić
Assistant coaches	(Bosnia and Herzegovina) Haris Alihodžić
Goalkeeping coach	(Bosnia and Herzegovina) Adnan Gušo
Fitness coach	(Bosnia and Herzegovina) Almir Seferović
Doctors	(Bosnia and Herzegovina) Zlatko Dervišević
Doctors	(Bosnia and Herzegovina) Edin Kulenović
Doctors	(Bosnia and Herzegovina) Harun Đozić
Physiotherapists	(Bosnia and Herzegovina) Raif Zeba
Physiotherapists	(Bosnia and Herzegovina) Adil Hubijar
Commissioner for Security	(Bosnia and Herzegovina) Erdijan Pekić

- Source: fkzeljeznicar.ba

== Competitions ==
=== Pre-season ===
24 June 2023 Friendly	Željezničar (Bosnia and Herzegovina)	2–0	(Montenegro) Arsenal Tivat	Zlatibor, Serbia
17:00	Drljo 60', 73'	Report		Stadium: Stadion Švajcarija

1 July 2023 Friendly	Željezničar (Bosnia and Herzegovina)	1–1	(Bosnia and Herzegovina) Tuzla City	Sarajevo
18:00	Allyson 80' (pen.)	Report	Hadžić 50'	Stadium: Grbavica Stadium

5 July 2023 Friendly	Željezničar (Bosnia and Herzegovina)	2–0	(Austria) Kapfenberg	Sarajevo
18:00	Amoah 28'; Turanjanin 82'	Report		Stadium: Grbavica Stadium

=== Mid-season ===
9 September 2023 Friendly	Rudar Han Bila (Bosnia and Herzegovina)	0–4	(Bosnia and Herzegovina) Željezničar	Han Bila
16:30		Report	Turanjanin; Drljo; Amoah; Efendić	Stadium: Stadion Han Bila

14 October 2023 Friendly	Zrinjski Mostar (Bosnia and Herzegovina)	1–0	(Bosnia and Herzegovina) Željezničar	Rodoč
15:30	Maglica 43'	Report		Stadium: Stadion Rodoč

15 October 2023 Friendly	Fojnica (Bosnia and Herzegovina)	0–7	(Bosnia and Herzegovina) Željezničar	Fojnica
14:30		Report	Džafo; Haračić; Jašarević; Drljo; Gasal; Turanjanin	Stadium: Stadion Fojnica

17 January 2024 Friendly	Međugorje (Bosnia and Herzegovina)	2–1	(Bosnia and Herzegovina) Željezničar	Međugorje
17:00	Bencun 1'; Obradović 58'	Report	Balaluk 73'

21 January 2024 Friendly	Željezničar (Bosnia and Herzegovina)	0–1	(Croatia) Neretvanac Opuzen	Međugorje
14:00		Report	Zubac 57'

24 January 2024 Friendly	Željezničar (Bosnia and Herzegovina)	2–0	(Croatia) Hrvace	Čitluk
13:00	Boljević 57'; Mekić 69'	Report		Stadium: Bare Stadium

1 February 2024 Friendly	Željezničar (Bosnia and Herzegovina)	2–0	(Bosnia and Herzegovina) Romanija Pale	Sarajevo
13:00	Cocalić 79'; Mekić 83'	Report

5 February 2024 Friendly	Željezničar (Bosnia and Herzegovina)	2–1	(Serbia) Vršac	Međugorje
14:00	Hiroš 32' (pen.); Pavić 90'	Report	Riquelme 2' (pen.)

7 February 2024 Friendly	Željezničar (Bosnia and Herzegovina)	1–0	(Bosnia and Herzegovina) Klis Buturović Polje	Međugorje
14:00	Zubanović 26'	Report

10 February 2024 Friendly	Željezničar (Bosnia and Herzegovina)	8–2	(Bosnia and Herzegovina) Velež Nevesinje	Međugorje
11:30	Cocalić 9'; Amoah 32', 40'; Hiroš 37'; Drljo 48'; Krpić 63'; Boljević 64'; Pavić 85'	Report	Drašković 42', 82'

21 February 2024 Friendly	Željezničar (Bosnia and Herzegovina)	1–0	(Bosnia and Herzegovina) Rudar Kakanj	Sarajevo
14:00	Charles 9'	Report

28 February 2024 Friendly	Željezničar (Bosnia and Herzegovina)	5–0	(Bosnia and Herzegovina) Bosna Visoko	Sarajevo
14:00	Galić; Haračić; Charles; Mijić	Report		Stadium: Grbavica Stadium

=== Overall ===
Competition	Started round	Final result	First match	Last Match
Premier League BiH	—N/a	6th	12 August 2023	26 May 2024
Kup BiH	First round	First round	28 September 2023	28 September 2023
Europa Conference League	First qualifying round	Second qualifying round	13 July 2023	3 August 2023

=== League table ===
Pos	Team	Pld	W	D	L	GF	GA	GD	Pts	Qualification or relegation
4	Sarajevo	33	16	8	9	57	38	+19	53 (Note: Sarajevo were deducted 3 points for having its players leave the pitch in protest of multiple officiating decisions during a Bosnian Cup game against Borac.)	Qualification to Conference League first qualifying round
5	Posušje	33	13	9	11	35	29	+6	48	
6	Željezničar	33	13	4	16	35	36	−1	43	
7	Sloga Doboj	33	13	3	17	37	50	−13	42	
8	Široki Brijeg	33	11	6	16	37	45	−8	39	

Source: Rezultati.com
Rules for classification: 1) Points; 2) Goal difference; 3) Goals scored; 4) Head-to-head points; 5) Head-to-head goal difference; 6) Head-to-head away goals (only if two teams); 7) Head-to-head goals scored; 8) Goal difference; 9) Play-off. (Criteria 2 and 3 are not used to decide champion, UEFA competition qualification, or relegation)

==== Results summary ====
Overall								Home						Away					
Pld	W	D	L	GF	GA	GD	Pts	W	D	L	GF	GA	GD	W	D	L	GF	GA	GD
33	13	4	16	35	36	−1	43	10	3	3	21	9	+12	3	1	13	14	27	−13

Source: Sportsport.ba

==== Results by round ====
Round	3	4	5	1	6	7	2	8	9	10	11	12	13	14	15	16	17	18	19	20	21	22	23	24	25	26	27	28	29	30	31	32	33
Ground	H	A	H	H	A	H	A	A	H	A	H	A	H	A	H	A	H	A	H	A	H	A	A	H	A	H	A	H	A	H	A	A	H
Result	W	L	W	W	L	L	L	L	W	L	W	L	W	L	D	L	L	L	D	L	W	L	L	L	W	D	L	W	W	W	D	W	W
Position	7	9	6	4	4	5	6	8	7	7	6	8	6	7	7	8	8	10	9	9	8	10	10	11	9	11	11	9	8	7	7	7	6
Points	3	3	6	9	9	9	9	9	12	12	15	15	18	18	19	19	19	19	20	20	23	23	23	23	26	27	27	30	33	36	37	40	43

Source: Competitions
A = Away; H = Home; W = Win; D = Draw; L = Loss

==== Matches ====
12 August 2023 3	Željezničar	2–0	Borac Banja Luka	Sarajevo
20:45	Mekić 47', 54'; Kosorić (yellow card) 64'; Jašarević (yellow card) 77'; Ćosić (yellow card) 84'	Report	Čavić (yellow card) 90'	Stadium: Grbavica Stadium; Attendance: 7,000; Referee: Aleksandar Njegomirović (Prnjavor)

19 August 2023 4	Posušje	1–0	Željezničar	Posušje
20:45	Vrgoč (yellow card) 13'; Kamenar 25'; Marić (yellow card) 55'; Lučić (yellow card) 62'; Z. Begić (yellow card) 75'	Report	Kosorić (yellow card) 13'; Haračić (yellow card) 45'; Ćosić (yellow card) 53'; Cocalić (yellow card) 73'; Biber (yellow card) 80'; Galić (yellow card) 90'	Stadium: Mokri Dolac Stadium; Attendance: 1,600; Referee: Dragan Kesić (Gradiška)

26 August 2023 5	Željezničar	3–1	Tuzla City	Sarajevo
20:45	Nikić 3' (o.g.); Ćosić (yellow card) 30'; Mekić 50'; Biber (yellow card) 55'; Rustemović (yellow card) 70'; Turanjanin (yellow card) 79'; Krpić 86'	Report	Nukić (yellow card) 35'; Šukilović (red card) 50'; Delimeđac (yellow card) 61'; Mašović 69', (yellow card) 90'	Stadium: Grbavica Stadium; Attendance: 7,700; Referee: Josip Martinović (Čapljina)

30 August 2023 1 (Note: Match of Round 1 postponed because of Željezničar's participation in the UEFA Europa Conference League second qualifying round.)	Željezničar	1–0	Igman Konjic	Sarajevo
18:30	Ovčina (yellow card) 70'; Amoah (yellow card) 82'; Rustemović (yellow card) 83'; Cocalić 86'; Gasal (yellow card) 90+2'; Muftić (yellow card) 90+4'	Report	Denković (yellow card) 37'; Oremuš (yellow card) 67'; Čubrilo (yellow card) 68'; Ćeman (yellow card) 81'; Bešagić (yellow card) 83'; Đorić (yellow card) 85'	Stadium: Grbavica Stadium; Attendance: 6,900; Referee: Elvedin Topuzović (Tuzla)

3 September 2023 6	Velež Mostar	1–0	Željezničar	Mostar
19:45	Guliashvili (yellow card) 64'; Domić (yellow card) 83'; Haskić 89'; Hadžikić (yellow card) 90'	Report	Rustemović (yellow card) 5'; Jašarević (yellow card) 13'; Mekić (yellow card) 36'; Amoah (yellow card) 54'; Allyson (yellow card) 64'; Galić (yellow card) 74'	Stadium: Stadion Rođeni; Attendance: 4,000; Referee: Miloš Gigović (Gradiška)

15 September 2023 7	Željezničar	2–3	GOŠK Gabela	Sarajevo
18:30	Mekić 33', (yellow card) 84'; Kosorić (yellow card) 61'; Krpić (yellow card) 76'; Haračić 90+1'	Report	Šero (yellow card) 22'; Skorup 60', (yellow card) 68'; Hasukić 74', (yellow card) 78'; Mandić (yellow card) 76'; Musulin (yellow card) 77'; Obšivač (yellow card) 86'; Nižić 90+7'	Stadium: Grbavica Stadium; Attendance: 7,200; Referee: Antoni Bandić (Grude)

20 September 2023 2 (Note: Match of Round 2 postponed because of Željezničar's participation in the UEFA Europa Conference League second qualifying round.)	Sloga Doboj	3–0	Željezničar	Doboj
15:00	Grabež (yellow card) 21'; Jović 43'; Milanović (yellow card) 45'; Vidić 67', 90' (pen.)	Report	Rustemović (yellow card) 18'	Stadium: Luke Stadium; Attendance: 1,600; Referee: Aleksandar Njegomirović (Prnjavor)

24 September 2023 8	Zrinjski Mostar	2–1	Željezničar	Mostar
19:45	Jukić (yellow card) 65'; Ramić (yellow card) 70'; Jakovljević 78', (yellow card) 78'; Mišić 90'	Report	Jašarević 31'; Allyson (yellow card) 45'; Mekić (yellow card) 62'	Stadium: Stadion pod Bijelim Brijegom; Attendance: 4,500; Referee: Darko Gedžić (Brčko)

2 October 2023 9	Željezničar	2–1	Široki Brijeg	Sarajevo
18:00	Štilić 39'; Krpić 90+3'	Report	Kpan 53'; Musa (yellow card) 77'; Bagarić (yellow card) 87'	Stadium: Grbavica Stadium; Attendance: 5,150; Referee: Ermin Sivac (Zenica)

8 October 2023 10	Sarajevo	3–0	Željezničar	Sarajevo
20:30	Hasić 27'; Oliveira 45'; Čataković 90', (yellow card) 90'	Report	Mekić (yellow card) 26'; Galić (yellow card) 67'	Stadium: Asim Ferhatović Hase Stadium; Attendance: 21,000; Referee: Miloš Gigović (Gradiška)

21 October 2023 11	Željezničar	1–0	Zvijezda 09	Sarajevo
20:45	Amoah (yellow card) 56'; Mekić 58', (yellow card) 76'; Rustemović (yellow card) 79'; Drljo (yellow card) 90'	Report	Jelovac (yellow card) 41'; Subašić (yellow card) 82'; Raca (yellow card) 90'	Stadium: Grbavica Stadium; Attendance: 4,127; Referee: Elvedin Topuzović (Tuzla)

27 October 2023 12	Igman Konjic	2–0	Željezničar	Konjic
14:00	Oremuš (yellow card) 28'; Hebibović 77', (yellow card) 77'; Bojo 84'; Ahmetović (yellow card) 90'	Report	Selimović (red card) 10'; Galić (yellow card) 86'	Stadium: Konjic City Stadium; Attendance: 1,000; Referee: Haris Halkić (Sanski Most)

4 November 2023 13	Željezničar	1–0	Sloga Doboj	Sarajevo
16:00	Haračić 79'	Report	Popara (yellow card) 46'; Milanović (yellow card) 81'	Stadium: Grbavica Stadium; Attendance: 4,000; Referee: Josip Martinović (Čapljina)

12 November 2023 14	Borac Banja Luka	3–2	Željezničar	Banja Luka
15:15	Kvržić 6'; Lukić 24'; Nišić (yellow card) 67'; Jokić 90+4'; Kulašin (yellow card) 90+5'	Report	Boljević (yellow card) 19'; Krpić 30', 68'; Štilić (yellow card) 44'; Dubačkić (yellow card) 60'; Drljo (yellow card) 76'; Gasal (yellow card) 90+3'; Amoah (yellow card) 90+4'	Stadium: Banja Luka City Stadium; Attendance: 3,000; Referee: Aleksandar Njegomirović (Prnjavor)

26 November 2023 15	Željezničar	1–1	Posušje	Sarajevo
13:00	Galić (yellow card) 32'; Selimović (yellow card) 67', (goal) 90+4'	Report	Babić (yellow card) 16'; Kamenar 33'; Boban (yellow card) 36'; Bešlić (yellow card) 68'; D. Begić (yellow card) 86'	Stadium: Grbavica Stadium; Attendance: 4,000; Referee: Ermin Sivac (Zenica)

2 December 2023 16	Tuzla City	3–0	Željezničar	Tuzla
13:30	Nukić 1', 5'; Bihorac 32'; Ordagić (yellow card) 83'; Lolić (yellow card) 84'	Report	Galić (yellow card) 45'; Krpić (yellow card) 52'; Al-Jaber (yellow card) 57'	Stadium: Tušanj City Stadium; Attendance: 500; Referee: Ernis Džemidžić (Goražde)

8 December 2023 17	Željezničar	0–1	Velež Mostar	Sarajevo
18:00	Šehić (yellow card) 22'; Ovčina (yellow card) 41'; Biber (yellow card) 57'; Selimović (yellow card) 75'	Report	Šikalo (yellow card) 39'; Guliashvili 66'; Hadžikić (yellow card) 90+4'	Stadium: Grbavica Stadium; Attendance: 4,500; Referee: Luka Bilbija (Prijedor)

16 December 2023 18	GOŠK Gabela	1–0	Željezničar	Gabela
16:00	Ramljak (yellow card) 33'; Hasukić 87', (yellow card) 87'	Report	Amoah (yellow card) 10'; Galić (red card) 33'; Selimović (yellow card) 40'; Mekić (yellow card) 81'	Stadium: Stadium Perica-Pero Pavlović; Attendance: 500; Referee: Miloš Gigović (Gradiška)

17 February 2024 19	Željezničar	0–0	Zrinjski Mostar	Sarajevo
16:00	Radinović (yellow card) 9'; Karić (yellow card) 22'; Hiroš (yellow card) 79'	Report	Bradarić (yellow card) 39'; Sabljić (yellow card) 82'	Stadium: Grbavica Stadium; Attendance: 9,877; Referee: Ermin Sivac (Zenica)

26 February 2024 20	Široki Brijeg	2–0	Željezničar	Čitluk
13:00	Pranjić (yellow card) 56'; Kuprešak 59'; Mišić 90'	Report	Radinović (yellow card) 39'	Stadium: Bare Stadium; Attendance: 400; Referee: Josip Martinović (Čapljina)

3 March 2024 21	Željezničar	3–0	Sarajevo	Sarajevo
18:45	Hiroš 12'; Selimović (yellow card) 55'; Galić 59', 70', (yellow card) 82'; Karić (yellow card) 65'; Ovčina (yellow card) 90+4'; Krpić (yellow card) 90+4'	Report	Čataković (yellow card) 90'; Soldo (yellow card) 90+4'; Iliev (red card) 90+4'	Stadium: Grbavica Stadium; Attendance: 8,500; Referee: Ermin Sivac (Zenica)

10 March 2024 22	Zvijezda 09	2–1	Željezničar	Ugljevik
14:00	Tomanović (yellow card) 37'; Vadze 40'; Saliman (yellow card) 45'; Selimović 63' (o.g.); Karaklajić (yellow card) 77'; Maksimović (yellow card) 90'	Report	Hiroš (yellow card) 25'; Boljević 32'	Stadium: Ugljevik City Stadium; Attendance: 1,500; Referee: Elvedin Topuzović (Tuzla)

16 March 2024 23	Zrinjski Mostar	2–0	Željezničar	Mostar
16:00	Ćorluka (yellow card) 8'; Mulahusejnović 79'; Marić (yellow card) 83'; Ćuže 89'	Report	Radinović (yellow card) 10' (yellow-red card) 90+2'; Karić (yellow card) 11'; Hiroš (yellow card) 42'; Haračić (yellow card) 50'	Stadium: Stadion pod Bijelim Brijegom; Attendance: 1,500; Referee: Darko Gedžić (Brčko)

29 March 2024 24	Željezničar	0–1	Velež Mostar	Sarajevo
20:00	Galić (yellow card) 24'; Radovac (yellow card) 32'; Amoah (yellow card) 64'; Mekić (yellow card) 79'	Report	Šturm (yellow card) 27'; Halilović 54'; Haskić (yellow card) 69'; Suljić (yellow card) 79'	Stadium: Grbavica Stadium; Attendance: 8,450; Referee: Elvedin Topuzović (Tuzla)

7 April 2024 25	Sloga Doboj	0–3	Željezničar	Modriča
14:00		Report	Štilić 48'; Krpić 53'; Hiroš 90+2'	Stadium: Stadion Dr. Milan Jelić; Attendance: 1,000; Referee: Miloš Gigović (Gradiška)

14 April 2024 26	Željezničar	0–0	Sarajevo	Sarajevo
20:00	Hiroš (red card) 19'; Krpić (yellow card) 19'; Štilić (yellow card) 31'; Cocalić (red card) 45+2'; Ovčina (yellow card) 90'	Report	Radović (yellow card) 4' (red card) 45'; Julardžija (yellow card) 19'; Kyeremeh (yellow card) 28'; Čelik (yellow card) 41'; Mustafić (yellow card) 87'; Aničić (yellow card) 90+2'	Stadium: Grbavica Stadium; Attendance: 11,000; Referee: Ermin Sivac (Zenica)

19 April 2024 27	Posušje	1–0	Željezničar	Posušje
18:00	Rozić 14'; Lučić (red card) 16'; Kamenar (yellow card) 22'; Hanuljak (yellow card) 89'	Report	Cavnić (yellow card) 64'; Boljević (yellow card) 90'	Stadium: Mokri Dolac Stadium; Attendance: 3,000; Referee: Ernis Džemidžić (Goražde)

23 April 2024 28	Željezničar	1–0	Široki Brijeg	Sarajevo
20:30	Karić (yellow card) 2'; Galić (yellow card) 25'; Štilić (yellow card) 37'; Krpić 49'	Report	Mamić (yellow card) 64'; Barišić (yellow card) 90+2'	Stadium: Grbavica Stadium; Attendance: 7,000; Referee: Aleksandar Njegomirović (Prnjavor)

27 April 2024 29	GOŠK Gabela	1–2	Željezničar	Gabela
16:00	Skorup 6'; Hasukić (yellow card) 30'; Čajić (yellow card) 44'; Šero (yellow card) 60'; Gogić (yellow card) 80'; Batarelo (yellow card) 90+7'	Report	Krpić 21', (yellow card) 81'; Al-Jaber 46'; Radovac (yellow card) 65'; Ovčina (yellow card) 84'	Stadium: Stadium Perica-Pero Pavlović; Attendance: 1,000; Referee: Luka Bilbija (Prijedor)

3 May 2024 30	Željezničar	2–0	Tuzla City	Sarajevo
18:00	Hodžić 37' (o.g.); Krpić 67'	Report	Nikić (yellow card) 30'	Stadium: Grbavica Stadium; Attendance: 7,000; Referee: Ermin Sivac (Zenica)

12 May 2024 31	Igman Konjic	0–0	Željezničar	Konjic
15:30	Mešinović (yellow card) 34'; Denković (yellow card) 45'; Đorić (yellow card) 55'; Oremuš (yellow card) 63'; Buturović (yellow card) 78'	Report	Krpić (yellow card) 18'; Galić (yellow card) 26'; Mekić (yellow card) 55'	Stadium: Konjic City Stadium; Attendance: 3,000; Referee: Frano Jelić (Široki Brijeg)

20 May 2024 32	Zvijezda 09	0–5	Željezničar	Ugljevik
17:00	Đurić (yellow card) 12'; Šipovac (yellow card) 82'	Report	Drina 14'; Mekić 61'; Zubanović 72', 85'; Šapić 76' (o.g.)	Stadium: Ugljevik City Stadium; Attendance: 350; Referee: Ernis Džemidžić (Goražde)

26 May 2024 33	Željezničar	2–1	Borac Banja Luka	Sarajevo
17:00	Boljević 19', 30'; Al-Jaber (yellow card) 45'; Krpić (yellow card) 77'	Report	Hrelja (yellow card) 24'; Lukić 76'; Fićović (yellow card) 85'	Stadium: Grbavica Stadium; Attendance: 10,506; Referee: Haris Halkić (Sanski Most)

=== Kup BiH ===
==== Round of 32 ====
28 September 2023	Sloboda Tuzla	1–0	Željezničar	Tuzla
19:00	Kurtalić (yellow card) 56'; Muminović (yellow card) 82'; Kapetanović 83'	Report	Jašarević (yellow card) 88'	Stadium: Tušanj City Stadium; Attendance: 5,000; Referee: Dražen Marić (Bijeljina)

=== UEFA Europa Conference League ===
==== First qualifying round ====
13 July 2023 First leg	Željezničar (Bosnia and Herzegovina)	2–2	(Belarus) Dinamo Minsk	Sarajevo, Bosnia and Herzegovina
20:30	Amoah (yellow card) 34'; Drina (yellow card) 83'; Haračić 85', 90'	Report	Shvyatsow (yellow card) 39'; Bakhar 41'; Bykov (yellow card) 50'; Morozov 50'	Stadium: Grbavica Stadium; Attendance: 13,050; Referee: Evangelos Manouchos (Greece)

20 July 2023 Second leg	Dinamo Minsk (Belarus)	1–2 (3–4 agg.)	(Bosnia and Herzegovina) Željezničar	Baku, Azerbaijan (Note: Due to the country's involvement in the Russian invasion of Ukraine, Belarusian teams are required to play their home matches at neutral venues and behind closed doors until further notice.)
19:00	Sedko 64' (pen.)	Report	Rustemović (yellow card) 18'; Drina (yellow card) 30'; Amoah (yellow card) 41'; Sachywka 44' (o.g.); Mulalić (yellow card) 62'; Krpić 78'; Kosorić (yellow card) 84'	Stadium: Azersun Arena; Attendance: 0 Referee: Michal Ocenáš (Slovakia)

==== Second qualifying round ====
27 July 2023 First leg	Željezničar (Bosnia and Herzegovina)	2–2	(Azerbaijan) Neftçi	Sarajevo, Bosnia and Herzegovina
21:00	Haračić 14'; Biber (yellow card) 43'; Drina (yellow card) 45+1'; Ovčina (yellow card) 45+2'; Amoah 45+8'	Report	Kosorić 44' (o.g.); Saief (yellow card) 45+2'; Hajiyev 90+5'	Stadium: Grbavica Stadium; Attendance: 13,157; Referee: Juri Frischer (Estonia)

3 August 2023 Second leg	Neftçi (Azerbaijan)	2–0 (4–2 agg.)	(Bosnia and Herzegovina) Željezničar	Baku, Azerbaijan
19:00	Saief 20'; Matias (yellow card) 44'; Eddy 68'; Brkić (yellow card) 90+8'; Zulfugarli (yellow card) 90+10'	Report	Kosorić (yellow card) 44'; Rustemović (yellow card) 45'; Krpić (yellow card) 80'; Jašarević (yellow card) 90+10'	Stadium: Bakcell Arena; Attendance: 10,000; Referee: Balázs Berke (Hungary)

== Statistics ==
=== Goalscorers ===
Rank	No.	Pos.	Nat.	Player	Premier League BiH	Kup BiH	Europa Conference League	Total
1	7	FW	(Bosnia and Herzegovina)	Sulejman Krpić	8	—	1	9
2	8	MF	(Bosnia and Herzegovina)	Nedim Mekić	6	—	—	6
3	9	FW	(Bosnia and Herzegovina)	Dženan Haračić	2	—	3	5
4	23	MF	(Montenegro)	Aleksandar Boljević	3	—	—	3
5	10	MF	(Bosnia and Herzegovina)	Amer Hiroš	2	—	—	2
5	11	FW	(Bosnia and Herzegovina)	Faris Zubanović	2	—	—	2
5	14	MF	(Bosnia and Herzegovina)	Semir Štilić	2	—	—	2
5	24	DF	(Bosnia and Herzegovina)	Marin Galić	2	—	—	2
9	6	DF	(Bosnia and Herzegovina)	Edin Cocalić	1	—	—	1
9	19	DF	(Bosnia and Herzegovina)	Amar Drina	1	—	—	1
9	22	MF	(Saudi Arabia)	Abdulmalik Al-Jaber	1	—	—	1
9	26	MF	(Ghana)	Joseph Amoah	—	—	1	1
9	31	DF	(Luxembourg)	Vahid Selimović	1	—	—	1
9	33	DF	(Bosnia and Herzegovina)	Irfan Jašarević	1	—	—	1
Own goals (from the opponents)					3	—	1	4
Totals					35	0	6	41

=== Assists ===
Rank	No.	Pos.	Nat.	Player	Premier League BiH	Kup BiH	Europa Conference League	Total
1	26	MF	(Ghana)	Joseph Amoah	6	—	—	6
2	7	FW	(Bosnia and Herzegovina)	Sulejman Krpić	2	—	2	4
2	23	MF	(Montenegro)	Aleksandar Boljević	4	—	—	4
4	8	MF	(Bosnia and Herzegovina)	Nedim Mekić	2	—	1	3
4	10	MF	(Bosnia and Herzegovina)	Amer Hiroš	3	—	—	3
4	33	DF	(Bosnia and Herzegovina)	Irfan Jašarević	1	—	2	3
7	3	DF	(Montenegro)	Stefan Radinović	1	—	—	1
7	14	MF	(Bosnia and Herzegovina)	Semir Štilić	1	—	—	1
7	15	DF	(Bosnia and Herzegovina)	Benjamin Šehić	1	—	—	1
7	19	DF	(Bosnia and Herzegovina)	Amar Drina	1	—	—	1
7	24	DF	(Bosnia and Herzegovina)	Marin Galić	1	—	—	1
7	44	MF	(Bosnia and Herzegovina)	Edin Rustemović	1	—	—	1
7	77	MF	(Bosnia and Herzegovina)	Haris Ovčina	1	—	—	1
Totals					25	0	5	30

=== Clean sheets ===
Rank	No.	Nat.	Player	Premier League BiH	Kup BiH	Europa Conference League	Total
1	13	(Bosnia and Herzegovina)	Vedad Muftić	12	—	0	12
2	1	(Bosnia and Herzegovina)	Ajdin Mulalić	—	—	0	0
Totals				12	0	0	12

=== Disciplinary record ===
No.	Pos.	Nat.	Name	Premier League BiH			Kup BiH			Europa Conference League			Total		
No.	Pos.	Nat.	Name	Booked	(yellow card) (yellow-red card)	Sent off (straight red)	Booked	(yellow card) (yellow-red card)	Sent off (straight red)	Booked	(yellow card) (yellow-red card)	Sent off (straight red)	Booked	(yellow card) (yellow-red card)	Sent off (straight red)
24	DF	(Bosnia and Herzegovina)	Marin Galić	10		1							10		1
7	FW	(Bosnia and Herzegovina)	Sulejman Krpić	7						1			8		
8	MF	(Bosnia and Herzegovina)	Nedim Mekić	8									8		
26	MF	(Ghana)	Joseph Amoah	6						2			8		
44	MF	(Bosnia and Herzegovina)	Edin Rustemović	5						2			7		
77	MF	(Bosnia and Herzegovina)	Haris Ovčina	5						1			6		
5	DF	(Bosnia and Herzegovina)	Aleksandar Kosorić	3						2			5		
18/25	MF	(Bosnia and Herzegovina)	Edin Biber	3						1			4		
20	MF	(Bosnia and Herzegovina)	Harun Karić	4									4		
31	DF	(Luxembourg)	Vahid Selimović	4		1							4		1
33	DF	(Bosnia and Herzegovina)	Irfan Jašarević	2			1			1			4		
10	MF	(Bosnia and Herzegovina)	Amer Hiroš	3		1							3		1
14	MF	(Bosnia and Herzegovina)	Semir Štilić	3									3		
19	DF	(Bosnia and Herzegovina)	Amar Drina							3			3		
97	DF	(Bosnia and Herzegovina)	Mehmed Ćosić	3									3		
3	DF	(Montenegro)	Stefan Radinović	2	1								2	1	
9	FW	(Bosnia and Herzegovina)	Dženan Haračić	2									2		
11	MF	(Bosnia and Herzegovina)	Hamza Gasal	2									2		
17	MF	(Bosnia and Herzegovina)	Andrija Drljo	2									2		
20	MF	(Brazil)	Allyson	2									2		
22	MF	(Saudi Arabia)	Abdulmalik Al-Jaber	2									2		
23	MF	(Montenegro)	Aleksandar Boljević	2									2		
88	MF	(Bosnia and Herzegovina)	Samir Radovac	2									2		
1	GK	(Bosnia and Herzegovina)	Ajdin Mulalić							1			1		
4	DF	(Montenegro)	Nemanja Cavnić	1									1		
6	DF	(Bosnia and Herzegovina)	Edin Cocalić	1		1							1		1
13	GK	(Bosnia and Herzegovina)	Vedad Muftić	1									1		
15	DF	(Bosnia and Herzegovina)	Benjamin Šehić	1									1		
21	MF	(Bosnia and Herzegovina)	Nikola Turanjanin	1									1		
30	DF	(Bosnia and Herzegovina)	Dražen Dubačkić	1									1		
Totals				88	1	4	1			14			103	1	4

Source: Competitive matches and fkzeljeznicar.ba
Ordered by (red card) , (second yellow card) and (yellow card)
(yellow card) = Number of bookings; (second yellow card) = Number of sending offs after a second yellow card; (red card) = Number of sending offs by a direct red card.
