= 2008–09 Second League of the Republika Srpska =

The 2008–09 Second League of Republika Srpska season was the fourteenth since its establishment.

== Group East ==
=== Clubs and stadiums ===
Club	City	Stadium	2007–08 season
Gorica	Pučile, Bijeljina		7th in Second League Centre
Han Pijesak	Han Pijesak		7th in Second League South
Jedinstvo	Brodac, Bijeljina		9th in Second League Centre
Lokomotiva	Brčko		4th in Second League Centre
Milići	Milići		Regional League
Mladost	Rogatica		5th in Second League South
Mladost	Velika Obarska, Bijeljina		Regional League
Napredak	Šepak Donji, Zvornik		2nd in Second League South
Podrinje	Janja, Bijeljina		2nd in Second League Centre
Podrinje	Tršić, Zvornik		8th in Second League South
Proleter	Dvorovi, Bijeljina		5th in Second League Centre
Romanija	Pale		3rd in Second League South
Rudar	Ugljevik		15th in First League
OFK Šekovići	Šekovići		9th in Second League South
Velež	Nevesinje		4th in Second League South
Vlasenica	Vlasenica		6th in Second League South

=== League standings ===
Pos	Team	Pld	W	D	L	GF	GA	GD	Pts	Promotion or relegation
1	Romanija Pale	21	13	5	3	48	20	+28	44	Promoted to First League of Republika Srpska
2	Napredak Šepak Donji	21	13	3	5	41	18	+23	42	
3	Podrinje Janja	21	12	4	5	43	20	+23	40	
4	Proleter Dvorovi	21	11	3	7	26	28	−2	36	
5	Mladost Velika Obarska	20	11	2	7	40	19	+21	35	
6	Vlasenica	20	10	4	6	26	17	+9	34	
7	Gorica	21	8	5	8	32	28	+4	29	
8	Jedinstvo Brodac	20	8	4	8	28	27	+1	28	
9	Velež Nevesinje	21	7	4	10	28	40	−12	25	
10	Mladost Rogatica	20	7	4	9	29	43	−14	25	
11	Lokomotiva Brčko	20	6	5	9	17	25	−8	23	
12	Milići	20	4	6	10	14	24	−10	18	
13	Rudar Ugljevik	19	5	3	11	24	38	−14	18	
14	OFK Šekovići	21	4	4	13	24	50	−26	16	
15	Podrinje Tršić	20	1	10	9	9	32	−23	13	Relegated to Regionalne lige
—	Han Pijesak	0	0	0	0	0	0	0	0	Relegated to Regionalne lige

== Group West ==
=== Clubs and stadiums ===
Club	City	Stadium	2007–08 season
Gomionica			Regional League
Omarska	Omarska		Regional League

=== League standings ===
Pos	Team	Pld	W	D	L	GF	GA	GD	Pts	Promotion or relegation
1	Sloga Trn	22	17	4	1	61	9	+52	55	Promoted to First League of Republika Srpska
2	Gomionica	21	13	6	2	48	15	+33	45	
3	Sloboda Mrkonjić Grad	22	11	7	4	46	27	+19	40	
4	Jedinstvo Žeravica	22	13	1	8	38	28	+10	40	
5	Sloga Srbac	22	11	5	6	41	27	+14	38	
6	Ravan	22	11	5	6	35	32	+3	38	
7	Krajina	22	10	6	6	29	23	+6	36	
8	Tekstilac	22	9	3	10	32	46	−14	30	
9	Župa-Milka	22	9	2	11	41	43	−2	29	
10	Mladost Kotor Varoš	22	8	4	10	28	26	+2	28	
11	Ozren	22	8	4	10	31	39	−8	28	
12	Omarska	22	8	1	13	29	48	−19	25	
13	Sloga-DIPO	21	6	2	13	33	43	−10	20	
14	Polet	22	4	5	13	24	39	−15	17	
15	Željezničar Doboj	22	3	5	14	26	59	−33	14	Relegated
16	Vranjak	22	2	4	16	21	59	−38	10	Relegated
