= 2024–25 FK Radnički 1923 season =

FK Radnički 1923
2024–25 season
- Manager: Feđa Dudić
- Stadium: Čika Dača Stadium
- Serbian SuperLiga: 5th
- Serbian Cup: Round of 16
- UEFA Conference League: Second qualifying round

The 2024–25 season was the 102nd season in the history of FK Radnički 1923, and the club's fourth consecutive season in Serbian SuperLiga. In addition to the domestic league, the club participated in the Serbian Cup and the UEFA Conference League.

== Squad ==
As of 19 June 2024

Note: Flags indicate national team as defined under FIFA eligibility rules; some limited exceptions apply. Players may hold more than one non-FIFA nationality.

No.	Pos.	Nation	Player
1	GK	SRB	Vasilije Žunić
4	DF	BIH	Marko Mihojević
5	DF	BIH	Besim Šerbečić (on loan from Sarajevo)
6	DF	SRB	Andrija Radovanović
7	FW	SRB	Matija Gluščević
8	DF	BIH	Mehmed Ćosić
9	FW	COL	Dilan Ortíz
14	DF	SRB	Slobodan Simović
15	DF	SRB	Milan Mitrović (captain)
16	MF	SRB	Uroš Vidović
17	FW	SRB	Veljko Dimitrijević
18	FW	SRB	Andreja Ristić
19	FW	SRB	Pavle Ivelja
20	DF	SRB	Ljubiša Pecelj
22	MF	SRB	Aleksandar Petrović
23	DF	MNE	Bojan Adžić
26	GK	SRB	Stojan Leković

No.	Pos.	Nation	Player
27	MF	SRB	Miloš Ristić
32	MF	SRB	Nikola Bukumira
33	MF	SRB	Vanja Tomić
45	GK	SRB	Miloš Mladenović
50	DF	CRO	Tomislav Dadić
55	MF	SRB	Milutin Vidosavljević
70	FW	SRB	Milan Aleksić
77	FW	TUN	Wajdi Sahli
79	GK	SRB	David Spasojević
80	FW	BRA	Evandro
90	FW	SRB	Milan Vidakov
93	FW	GLP	Kilian Bevis
—	FW	USA	Vukašin Bulatović
—	FW	SRB	Bogdan Mirčetić
—	MF	BIH	Samir Zeljković
—	GK	SRB	Luka Lijeskić
—	FW	SRB	Miloš Rošević

== Friendlies ==
=== Pre-season ===
28 June 2024 Friendly	Radnički 1923 (Serbia)	3–0	(Serbia) Radnički Niš
11:00	Bevis 63'; Vidosavljević 67', 87' (pen.)

2 July 2024 Friendly	Radnički 1923 (Serbia)	v	(Montenegro) FK Dečić
11:00

6 July 2024 Friendly	Radnički 1923 (Serbia)	4–2	(Bosnia and Herzegovina) FK Sloga Meridian
19:30

9 July 2024 Friendly	Radnički 1923 (Serbia)	1–1	(Cyprus) APOEL	Užice, Serbia
18:00				Stadium: Stadion Radomir Antić

== Competitions ==
=== Overall record ===
Competition	First match	Last match	Starting round	Final position	Record							
Competition	First match	Last match	Starting round	Final position	Pld	W	D	L	GF	GA	GD	Win %
Serbian SuperLiga	19 July 2024		Matchday 1		1	0	0	1	2	3	−1	0.00
Serbian Cup					0	0	0	0	0	0	+0	—
UEFA Conference League	25 July 2024	31 July 2024	Second qualifying round	Second qualifying round	2	1	0	1	2	2	+0	50.00
Total					3	1	0	2	4	5	−1	33.33

Last updated: 31 July 2024
Source: Soccerway

=== Serbian SuperLiga ===
==== Results summary ====
Overall								Home						Away					
Pld	W	D	L	GF	GA	GD	Pts	W	D	L	GF	GA	GD	W	D	L	GF	GA	GD
22	10	4	8	39	31	+8	34	6	2	3	20	10	+10	4	2	5	19	21	−2

Last updated: 8 February 2025.
Source: soccerway

==== Results by round ====
Round	1	2	3	4	5	6	7	8	9	10	11	12	13	14	15	16	17	18	19	20	21	22	23	24	25
Ground	H	A	H	A	H	A	H	A	H	A	H	A	H	H	A	A	H	A	H	A	H	A	H	A	H
Result	L	W	W	L	D	W	L	L	W	L	D	W	W	W	D	D	L	W	W	L	W	L			
Position	9	7	6	8	6	3	7	10	7	8	9	6	5	5	5	5	6	5	5	5	3	4			

Updated to match(es) played on 8 February 2025. Source: worldfootball
A = Away; H = Home; W = Win; D = Draw; L = Loss

==== Matches ====
The match schedule was released on 10 June 2024.

19 July 2024 1	Radnički 1923	2–3	Železničar Pančevo	Leskovac
19:00 UTC+2	Jovanović 29' (o.g.); Mitrović 53' (o.g.)		Knežević 3'; Grgić 15'; Romanić 45+3'	Stadium: Lazar Romanić; Referee: Milan Mitić

4 August 2024 3	Radnički 1923	4–0		Gornji Milanovac
21:00 CET	Bevis 33' (yellow card) 45+8'; Gluščević (yellow card) 39'; Tomislav Dadić (yellow card) 45'; Evandro 45+13'; Vidosavljević 83'; Mirčetić 85'	Report	Stojanović (yellow card) 39'; Vojnović (yellow card) 45+4'; Nišić (yellow card) 45+13'	Stadium: Stadion Metalac; Attendance: 800; Referee: (Serbia) Andrija Stojanović

10 August 2024 4	Spartak Subotica	1–0	Radnički 1923	Senta
20:00 CET	Andrej Todoroski 2'; Lukić (yellow card) 28'	Report	Tomislav Dadić (yellow card) 33'; Ćosić (yellow card) 59'; Šerbečić (yellow card) 72'	Stadium: Senta City Stadium; Attendance: 300; Referee: (Serbia) Aleksandar Živković

19 August 2024 5	Radnički 1923	2–2	Vojvodina	Gornji Milanovac
19:00 CET	Ortiz 40'; Vidosavljević 84' (pen.)	Report	Yusuf 4' 23'; Crnomarković (yellow card) 59'	Stadium: Stadion Metalac; Attendance: 1,200; Referee: (Serbia) Lazar Lukić

25 August 2024 6	OFK Beograd	3–5	Radnički 1923	Zaječar
19:00 CET	Aleksa Cvetković 7'; Paločević 44'; Kahvić 61'; Stefan Obradović (yellow card) 64'; Owusu (yellow card) 89'	Report	Šerbečić 10'; Aleksandar Đermanović 28' (o.g.); Ben Hassine 31'; Evandro 55' (yellow card) 68'; Bevis 71'; Aleksić (yellow card) 89'	Stadium: Kraljevica Stadium; Attendance: 1,000; Referee: (Serbia) Nenad Minaković

1 September 2024 7	Radnički 1923	0–1	Red Star Belgrade	Gornji Milanovac
19:00 CET	Ćosić (yellow card) 12'; Evandro (yellow card) 18'; Tomislav Dadić (yellow card) 40'; Bevis (yellow card) 71'; Gluščević (yellow card) 78' (yellow-red card) 78'; Alpha Turay (yellow card) 90+7'	Report	Ivanić 85'	Stadium: Stadion Metalac; Referee: (Serbia) Milan Ilić

14 September 2024 8	Mladost Lučani	2–1	Radnički 1923	Lucani
20:00 CET	Ognjen Krsmanović (yellow card) 36'; Pejović 48' (pen.) 55' (pen.); Tumbasević (yellow card) 77'; Leković (yellow card) 90+4'	Report	Evandro 11' (yellow card) 39'; Tomislav Dadić (yellow card) 61'	Stadium: Mladost Stadium; Attendance: 500; Referee: (Serbia) Lazar Lukić

18 September 2024 2	IMT	0–4	Radnički 1923	Loznica
18:00 CET	Siniša Popović (yellow card) 59'	Report	Bogdan Mirčetić 13' 18'; Ben Hassine (yellow card) 43'; Evandro 53' (pen.); Radović 59'; Nikola Bukumira (yellow card) 82'	Stadium: Lagator Stadium; Attendance: 300; Referee: (Serbia) Stanko Ostraćanin

23 September 2024 9	Radnički 1923	1–0	Tekstilac Odžaci	Gornji Milanovac
17:00 CET	Bogdan Mirčetić 8'; Radović (yellow card) 63'; Šerbečić (yellow card) 83'; Stankovski (yellow card) 90+2'	Report		Stadium: Stadion Metalac; Referee: (Serbia) Momčilo Marković

28 September 2024 10	Novi Pazar	2–0	Radnički 1923	Novi Pazar
18:00 CET	Đuranović 29' (yellow card) 46'; Dragan Bojat (yellow card) 56'; Bačkulja 90+7'	Report	Šerbečić (yellow card) 65'	Stadium: Caizcoin Arena; Attendance: 6,500; Referee: (Serbia) Nikola Petrović

5 October 2024 11	Radnički 1923	1–1	Čukarički	Gornji Milanovac
14:00 CET	Stankovski 7'; Aleksej Golijanin (yellow card) 14'; Tomislav Dadić (yellow card) 62'; Ortiz (yellow card) 75'; Radović (yellow card) 88'	Report	Diop (yellow card) 27'; Stanković (yellow card) 38'; Stevanović (yellow card) 43'; Rogan (yellow card) 49'; Tedić 84'; Ivanović (yellow card) 85'; Docić (yellow card) 90+5'	Stadium: Stadion Metalac; Referee: (Serbia) Danilo Nikolić

18 October 2024 12	TSC	0–2	Radnički 1923	Bačka Topola
19:00 CET	Jovanović (yellow card) 56'; Ćirković (yellow card) 90+4'	Report	Stankovski 2'; Gluščević (yellow card) 66'; Ćosić (yellow card) 79'; Aleksej Golijanin 84'	Stadium: TSC Arena; Attendance: 1,000; Referee: (Serbia) Srđan Jovanović

25 October 2024 13	Radnički 1923	4–0	Jedinstvo Ub	Gornji Milanovac
18:30 CET	Gluščević 6'; Ćosić 15'; Stankovski 33'; Zeljković 53'	Report		Stadium: Stadion Metalac; Attendance: 50; Referee: (Serbia) Novak Simović

3 November 2024 14	Radnički 1923	1–0	Napredak	Kragujevac
17:00 CET	Ben Hassine (yellow card) 54'; Bojan Adžić 87'; Tomislav Dadić (yellow card) 90'; Simović (yellow card) 90+6'	Report	Uroš Ignjatović (yellow card) 70'	Stadium: Čika Dača Stadium; Referee: (Serbia) Momčilo Marković

=== Serbian Cup ===
30 October 2024 Round of 32	Inđija	0-1	Radnički 1923	Inđija
13:00 CET	Aleksa Kuljanin (yellow card) 76'	Report	Evandro 15' (pen.); Tselios (yellow card) 54'; Nlandu (yellow card) 82'	Stadium: Inđija Stadium; Referee: (Serbia) Milan Balinovac

=== UEFA Conference League ===
==== Second qualifying round ====
The draw was held on 19 June 2024.

25 July 2024 First leg	Radnički 1923 (Serbia)	1–0	(Montenegro) Mornar	Leskovac, Serbia
20:00 UTC+2	Aleksić 72'	Report		Stadium: Dubočica Stadium; Referee: Ioannis Papadopoulos (Greece)

1 August 2024 Second leg	Mornar (Montenegro)	2–1 (a.e.t.) (2–2 agg.) (4–3 p)	(Serbia) Radnički 1923	Podgorica, Montenegro
20:45 UTC+2		Report		Stadium: DG Arena; Referee: Gal Leibovitz (Israel)
