= FK Proleter =

FK Proleter may refer to various football clubs from the Balkans:

- FK Proleter, defunct football club (1947-2005) from Zrenjanin, Serbia
- FK Proleter, football club from Novi Sad, Serbia
- FK Proleter, football club from Dvorovi near Bijeljina, Republika Srpska, Bosnia and Herzegovina
- FK Proleter, football club from Teslić, Republika Srpska, Bosnia and Herzegovina
- FK Proleter, football club from Makedonski Brod, North Macedonia

All of this clubs were established by communist Yugoslav authorities shortly after the end of World War II.
