= Republika Srpska official football team =

Official association football team representing Republika Srpska, Bosnia and Herzegovina

Republika Srpska
- Association: Football Association of Republika Srpska
- Confederation: None
- Head coach: None
- Home stadium: Banja Luka City Stadium
First colours	Second colours

First international
- Republika Srpska 1–1 Srpska Krajina (Republic of Serbian Krajina) (Banja Luka, Republika Srpska; 20 December 1992)

The Republika Srpska football team (Serbian: Фудбалска репрезентација Републике Српске, romanized: Fudbalska reprezentacija Republike Srpske) is the official team of Republika Srpska, an entity within Bosnia and Herzegovina. It is not affiliated with FIFA or UEFA.

The football team was formed in 1992, following the creation of Republka Srpska as a political entity. The Football Association of Republika Srpska (FSRS) was established on 5 September 1992 in spite of war in Bosnia and Herzegovina which had escalated earlier that year. The main task of FSRS in that period was to organize and manage competitions in the territory of Republika Srpska. The competitions were played in different league formats throughout wartime.

== History ==
During the last years before the break-up of Yugoslavia, football was experiencing much popularity throughout the country, specially because of the series of successes. Such were Yugoslavia winning the 1987 FIFA World Youth Championship, being runners-up at the 1990 UEFA European Under-21 Championship, an emotional campaign by the senior team in the 1990 FIFA World Cup in which Yugoslavia officially finished 5th after eliminating Spain in 1/8 finals, but losing dramatically in quarters against Argentina on penalties, a Red Star Belgrade winning of the 1990–91 European Cup and the 1991 Intercontinental Cup, and even the local Republika Srpska major club, FK Borac Banja Luka, won the 1992 Mitropa Cup. Football was always the most popular sport in all of Bosnia and Herzegovina, and those results had especially warm reception among Serbs in Bosnia because the Yugoslavia national team was known for having in Bosnia its strongest percentages of supporters, Red Star Belgrade was highly popular among Bosnian Serbs, and the conquest of Mitropa Cup in 1992 by Borac was the first ever international trophy won by a Bosnian team.

However, by the time Borac won the Mitropa title, its echo hardly was heard outside Serbian-inhabited parts of Bosnia. The war had started and Yugoslavia was disintegrating. Like the country itself, so the Yugoslav First League fell apart in stages. In summer 1991 clubs from Slovenia and Croatia left and formed their own leagues, and during the 1991–92 season, so did Macedonian and Bosnian clubs as well. Only Borac Banja Luka refused to leave the league and stayed competing in Yugoslav league system long after Bosnia declared independence, supposedly serving as a symbolic proof that Bosnian Serbs continued to belong to Yugoslavia, now formed by Serbia and Montenegro.

When war started, football was used as an important morale-boosting activity, providing soldiers with distraction from the front, and encouraging interaction with peacekeepers. When Bosnia and Herzegovina became internationally recognised, Bosnian Serbs declared their own state demanding independence from Bosnia and Herzegovina, the Republika Srpska. Football soon followed this decision, and the Football Association of Republika Srpska was formed along a senior national team. They played its first match at the Banja Luka City Stadium on 20 December 1992, when the rival to the Srpska team was a team representing the Republic of Serbian Krajina. This match ended 1–1. Srpska scored the first goal in the 16th minute thanks to Zoran Nešković and the equaliser was scored in the 45th minute by Tihomir Žorić. Žorić, then playing for Dinara from Knin, was chosen the best player of that friendly match. There were about 2,000 spectators at the FK Borac stadium. Republika Srpska was coached in that match by Miloš Đurković, assistant coach was Mladen Katić, and the selected players were Nikola Čobanović, Dragan Marković, Neđo Zdjelar, Sretko Vojkić, Zoran Vranješ, Stojan Janjetović, Veljko Salamić, Vlado Jagodić, Borče Sredojević, Ljubiša Kukavica, Borislav Tonković, Danijel Pajić, Jovica Lukić, Milan Miladinović, Stojan Malbašić, Enver Ališić, Mićo Gračanin, Zoran Nešković, Aleksa Marić, Predrag Šobot, Boris Gluhović, Filip Trivan, Drago Lukić and Miro Šarac.

The game had a much greater political meaning than a football one. Afterwards, war intensified, and no more national team matches for Republika Srpska were played, the FSRS was more focused in organising a proper club championship and cup competitions. The first to be formed was the Republika Srpska Cup in 1993, while, despite all efforts, a united First League of the Republika Srpska only got formed in 1995.

Although the Dayton Agreement (which ended war conflict in the country) allowed the general forming of independent sport organizations in Republika Srpska which would be recognized internationally, FIFA and UEFA allowed FSRS to participate in the international scene only as part of FSBiH. However, a possibility for international friendly matches for national teams of Republika Srpska was left open, but with explicit permission of FIFA. The national team of Republika Srpska had its "international debut" in 2000 against the Greek club Kavala which won 6–0. After that, two other "international matches" were played. In 2001, in Germany, there were two matches against Bayern II (lost by 0–1) and Schweinfurt 05 (won by 4–2). On the other hand, the U21 squad of Republika Srpska takes part in "international" friendly tournaments every year.

In 1995, the First League of Republika Srpska was established as a top division for clubs competition. Also a cup tournament was created, the Republika Srpska Cup. Meanwhile, separate leagues were formed in other parts of Bosnia and Herzegovina which gathered multinational, as well as ethnic Croat clubs in the country. The Football Association of Bosnia and Herzegovina, FSBiH, was created in 1992 and was recognised by FIFA in 1996 and UEFA in 1998. As the FSBiH was the only football federation in Bosnia and Herzegovina recognized by FIFA its clubs alone were allowed to compete internationally and contest the newly formed Premier League of Bosnia and Herzegovina. Faced with the fact that clubs from Republika Srpska hadn't been allowed to take part in international competitions, FSRS decided to join FSBiH, on 23 May 2002. After that, the First League of Republika Srpska became one of the two second leagues of the country, with the other, First League of the Federation of Bosnia and Herzegovina joining clubs from the rest of the country, was the other one. Top ranked clubs from the RS First League were promoted to the Premier League of Bosnia and Herzegovina, which started on 4 August the same year, and has been as such ever since.

The Republika Srpska official football team saw in July 2013 a disputed run over the election of the main coach between 3 candidates; Ilija Petković, Nebojša Gudelj and Željko Buvač. The elected was Buvač who has been keeping the post still by mid-2019. He succeeded Borče Sredojević who ended not leading any game. The first coach was Miloš Đurković, whose assistant was Mladen Katić, and next it was Velimir Sombolac, with Velimir Stojnić as his assistant.

== Current status ==
With similar situations in other regions having been granted opportunities to have international matches, and following FIFA's decision on 22 May 2012 to approve the Football Federation of Kosovo to play friendly matches, the FSRS President Mile Kovačević announced the next day that the Association would ask FIFA for the same.

However, FIFA and UEFA rejected requests in late 2013 for friendly match between the teams of Republika Srpska and Serbia, just like it happened earlier in 2008. Even though the Bosnian FA (N/FS BiH) has at times given permission in principle, the umbrella football organizations, FIFA and UEFA, have not given their consent, citing both the security concerns and non-recognition of entity selections, thus preventing such matches from taking place.

== Head coaches ==
- Miloš Đurković (1992)
- Velimir Sombolac (1998–2001)
- Borče Sredojević (2008)
- Nikola Nikić (2013)
- Željko Buvač (2013–2015)

== Assistant coaches ==
- Mladen Katić (1992)
- Velimir Stojnić (1998–2001)

== Recent results and forthcoming fixtures ==
=== Results in the past ===
Date	Competition	Location	Home team	Result	Away team
1992	Friendly	Banja Luka	Republika Srpska	1 – 1	(Republika Srpska) Serbian Krajina
1993	Friendly	Knin	(Republika Srpska) Serbian Krajina	2 – 0	Republika Srpska
1998	Friendly	Istočno Sarajevo	(Republika Srpska) Slavija Sarajevo	2 – 2	Republika Srpska
1999	Friendly	Banja Luka	Republika Srpska	2 – 2	(Republika Srpska) Kozara Gradiška
1999	Friendly	Banja Luka	Republika Srpska	2 – 1	(Republika Srpska) Rudar Ugljevik
1999	Friendly	Banja Luka	Republika Srpska	4 – 0	Republika Srpska U21
1999	Friendly	Dvorovi	(Republika Srpska) Proleter Dvorovi	0 – 4	Republika Srpska
2000	Friendly	Banja Luka	Republika Srpska	1 – 2	Republika Srpska U21
2000	Friendly	Banja Luka	Republika Srpska	4 – 0	(Greece) Kavala
2000	Friendly	Banja Luka	Republika Srpska	2 – 0	(Republika Srpska) Boksit Milići
2000	Friendly	Ugljevik	(Republika Srpska) Rudar Ugljevik	1 – 2	Republika Srpska
2000	Friendly	Banja Luka	Republika Srpska	4 – 1	Republika Srpska U21
2001	Friendly	Banja Luka	Republika Srpska	4 – 1	Republika Srpska U21
2001	Friendly	Munich, Germany	(Germany) Bayern Munich II	1 – 0	Republika Srpska
2001	Friendly	Munich, Germany	(Germany) Schweinfurt 05	2 – 4	Republika Srpska
2001	Friendly	Bijeljina	(Republika Srpska) Radnik Bijeljina	1 – 1	Republika Srpska

Games	Wins	Draws	Losses	Goals Scored	Goals Against
16	9	4	3	39	19

Republika Srpska played its first senior game in 1992 as the national team of the self-proclaimed Republika Srpska. It was the only game the team played under such circumstances. Its next game was in 1998, 3 years after the signing of the Dayton Agreement, and by then the FA of Republika Srpska had already become part of the structure of the Football Association of Bosnia and Herzegovina. Ever since, it has played unofficial matches against local and foreign clubs. Until 2019 the team has played a total of 15 games.

In recent years, Republika Srpska has planned to play a friendly match against Serbia. Although the Srpska team received the approval of the Football Association of Bosnia and Herzegovina, this match has not been played yet.

=== Youth competitions ===
Since 2000, the U19 team regularly takes part in the international Stevan Nešticki Tournament in Novi Sad, Serbia. Republika Srpska won the tournament on two occasions (in 2004 and 2012).

Date	Competition	Location	Home team	Result	Away team
8 November 2017	Friendly	(Serbia) Subotica	(Republika Srpska) Spartak Subotica	1 – 0	(Republika Srpska) Republic of Srpska U21
25 October 2017	Friendly	(Republika Srpska) Trebinje	(Republika Srpska) Republic of Srpska U15	1 – 0	Montenegro U15
24 October 2017	Friendly	(Republika Srpska) Gacko	(Republika Srpska) Republic of Srpska U15	0 – 1	Montenegro U15
11 May 2016	Friendly	(Serbia) Belgrade	(Serbia) Red Star Belgrade U17	1 – 1	Republika Srpska U17
13 April 2016	Friendly	(Republika Srpska) Šamac	(Republika Srpska) Borac Šamac	3 – 1	Republika Srpska U21
12 April 2016	Friendly	(Slovenia) Kranj	(Slovenia) Kranj	0 – 1	Republika Srpska U19
12 April 2016	Friendly	(Slovenia) Kranj	(Slovenia) Kranj	1 – 2	Republika Srpska U17
24 November 2015	3rd Republika Srpska Football Day	(Republika Srpska) Bijeljina	(Republika Srpska) Journalist Selection	1 – 3	Republika Srpska U21
17 October 2015	3rd Republika Srpska Football Day	(Republika Srpska) Rogatica	(Republika Srpska) Mladost Rogatica	0 – 7	Republika Srpska U15
29 September 2015	3rd Republika Srpska Football Day	(Republika Srpska) Rogatica	(Republika Srpska) Kozara Gradiška U13	0 – 1	Republika Srpska U13
15 September 2015	3rd Republika Srpska Football Day	(Bosnia and Herzegovina) Derventa	(Bosnia and Herzegovina) Tekstilac Derventa	0 – 6	Republika Srpska U15
2 August 2015	21st Jozef Kubina Tournament	(Czech Republic) Jablonec	(Czech Republic) Hradec Kralove U15	1 – 0	Republika Srpska U15
2 August 2015	21st Jozef Kubina Tournament	(Czech Republic) Jablonec	(Czech Republic) Pardubice U15	0 – 0 (2–3)	Republika Srpska U15
1 August 2015	21st Jozef Kubina Tournament	(Czech Republic) Jablonec	(Czech Republic) Hradec Kralove U15	1 – 2	Republika Srpska U15
1 August 2015	21st Jozef Kubina Tournament	(Czech Republic) Jablonec	(Czech Republic) Usti nad Labem U15	0 – 4	Republika Srpska U15
1 August 2015	21st Jozef Kubina Tournament	(Czech Republic) Jablonec	(Czech Republic) Slovan Liberec U15	2 – 1	Republika Srpska U15
2 August 2015	21st Jozef Kubina Tournament	(Czech Republic) Jablonec	(Czech Republic) Hradec Kralove U13	1 – 0	Republika Srpska U13
2 August 2015	21st Jozef Kubina Tournament	(Czech Republic) Jablonec	(Czech Republic) Slovan Liberec U13	0 – 2	Republika Srpska U13
1 August 2015	21st Jozef Kubina Tournament	(Czech Republic) Jablonec	(Czech Republic) Jablonec U13	0 – 3	Republika Srpska U13
1 August 2015	21st Jozef Kubina Tournament	(Czech Republic) Jablonec	(Czech Republic) Usti nad Labem U13	0 – 3	Republika Srpska U13
1 August 2015	21st Jozef Kubina Tournament	(Czech Republic) Jablonec	(Czech Republic) Banik Most U13	0 – 2	Republika Srpska U13
28 Jun 2015	Friendly	(Republika Srpska) Bileća	(Republika Srpska) Hercegovac Bileća U15	0 – 3	Republika Srpska U15
14 Jun 2015	Stevan Nešticki Tournament	(Serbia) Novi Sad	(Hungary) Puskás Akadémia U17	1 – 1	Republika Srpska U17
13 Jun 2015	Stevan Nešticki Tournament	(Serbia) Novi Sad	(Bulgaria) Slavia Sofia U17	2 – 0	Republika Srpska U17
12 Jun 2015	Stevan Nešticki Tournament	(Serbia) Novi Sad	(Serbia) Vojvodina U17	1 – 1	Republika Srpska U17
28 May 2015	Friendly	(Republika Srpska) Doboj	(Republika Srpska) FA Doboj U17	1 – 0	Republika Srpska U17
1 October 2014	2nd Republika Srpska Football Days	(Serbia) Novi Sad	(Serbia) Vojvodina U16	1 – 2	Republika Srpska U16
1 October 2014	2nd Republika Srpska Football Days	(Serbia) Novi Sad	(Serbia) Vojvodina U15	0 – 1	Republika Srpska U15
5 August 2014	20th Jozef Kubina Tournament	(Czech Republic) Jablonec	(Czech Republic) Admira Prague U14	1 – 1 (2–3)	Republika Srpska U14
5 August 2014	20th Jozef Kubina Tournament	(Czech Republic) Jablonec	(Czech Republic) Banik Most U12	4 – 2	Republika Srpska U12
4 August 2014	20th Jozef Kubina Tournament	(Czech Republic) Jablonec	(Czech Republic) Pardubice U14	1 – 0	Republika Srpska U14
4 August 2014	20th Jozef Kubina Tournament	(Czech Republic) Jablonec	(Czech Republic) Teplice U12	0 – 2	Republika Srpska U12
3 August 2014	20th Jozef Kubina Tournament	(Czech Republic) Jablonec	(Czech Republic) Usti nad Labem U14	0 – 1	Republika Srpska U14
3 August 2014	20th Jozef Kubina Tournament	(Czech Republic) Jablonec	(Czech Republic) Baumit Jablonec U12	0 – 2	Republika Srpska U12
2 August 2014	20th Jozef Kubina Tournament	(Czech Republic) Jablonec	(Czech Republic) Usti nad Labem U14	0 – 3	Republika Srpska U14
2 August 2014	20th Jozef Kubina Tournament	(Czech Republic) Jablonec	(Czech Republic) Usti nad Labem U12	0 – 12	Republika Srpska U12
1 August 2014	20th Jozef Kubina Tournament	(Czech Republic) Jablonec	(Czech Republic) Baumit Jablonec U14	0 – 4	Republika Srpska U14
1 August 2014	20th Jozef Kubina Tournament	(Czech Republic) Jablonec	(Czech Republic) Banik Most U12	0 – 2	Republika Srpska U12
15 June 2014	Duško Ožegović Tournament	(Republika Srpska) Banja Luka	(Slovenia) Olimpija Ljubljana U15	0 – 1	Republika Srpska U15
15 June 2014	Stevan Nešticki Tournament	(Serbia) Novi Sad	Republika Srpska U17	0 – 1	(Serbia) Vojvodina U17
14 June 2014	Duško Ožegović Tournament	(Republika Srpska) Banja Luka	(Croatia) RNK Split U15	0 – 0	Republika Srpska U15
14 June 2014	Stevan Nešticki Tournament	(Serbia) Novi Sad	(Serbia) Partizan U17	3 – 2	Republika Srpska U17
13 June 2014	Duško Ožegović Tournament	(Republika Srpska) Banja Luka	(Republika Srpska) Sloboda Mrkonjić Grad U15	3 – 0	Republika Srpska U15
13 June 2014	Stevan Nešticki Tournament	(Serbia) Novi Sad	(Hungary) Puskás Academia U17	2 – 0	Republika Srpska U17
28 November 2013	Friendly	(Republika Srpska) Bijeljina	Republika Srpska U15	1 – 1	Serbia U15
28 November 2013	Friendly	(Republika Srpska) Bijeljina	Republika Srpska U16	0 – 0	Serbia U16
17 October 2013	Friendly	(Republika Srpska) Bijeljina	Republika Srpska U14	1 – 1	(Serbia) FA Belgrade
9 October 2013	Friendly	(Switzerland) Geneva	(Switzerland) Servette	4 – 1	Republika Srpska U18
11 September 2013	1st Republika Srpska Football Day	(Republika Srpska) Banja Luka	Republika Srpska First League	0 – 2	Republika Srpska U21
11 September 2013	1st Republika Srpska Football Day	(Republika Srpska) Banja Luka	Republika Srpska U16	0 – 2	Republika Srpska U17
11 September 2013	1st Republika Srpska Football Day	(Republika Srpska) Banja Luka	Republika Srpska U15	3 – 0	(Republika Srpska) Sloga Doboj U15
11 September 2013	1st Republika Srpska Football Day	(Republika Srpska) Banja Luka	Republika Srpska U14	2 – 0	(Republika Srpska) Kozara Gradiška U14
11 September 2013	1st Republika Srpska Football Day	(Republika Srpska) Banja Luka	Republika Srpska U13	3 – 0	(Republika Srpska) Borac Banja Luka U13
5 September 2013	Friendly	(Republika Srpska) Banja Luka	Republika Srpska U12	2 – 2	(Serbia) Vojvodina U12
16 June 2013	Stevan Nešticki Tournament	(Serbia) Novi Sad	(Croatia) Osijek U19	4 – 2	Republika Srpska U19
15 June 2013	Stevan Nešticki Tournament	(Serbia) Novi Sad	(Serbia) Red Star Belgrade U19	4 – 0	Republika Srpska U19
14 June 2013	Stevan Nešticki Tournament	(Serbia) Novi Sad	(Hungary) Puskás Academia	2 – 0	Republika Srpska U19
5 June 2013	Friendly	(Serbia) Zemun	(Serbia) Partizan U15	1 – 6	Republika Srpska U15
5 June 2013	Friendly	(Serbia) Zemun	(Serbia) Partizan U15	0 – 8	Republika Srpska U15
23 April 2013	Friendly	(Hungary) Pécs	Hungary U14	5 – 3	Republika Srpska U14
23 April 2013	Friendly	(Hungary) Pécs	Hungary U15	1 – 3	Republika Srpska U15

== See also ==
- Football Association of Republika Srpska
- Football Association of Bosnia and Herzegovina
