= Željko Jurčić =

Yugoslav footballer (born 1946)

Personal information
- Full name: Željko Jurčić
- Date of birth: 21 July 1946 (age 80)
- Place of birth: Borovo, PR Croatia, FPR Yugoslavia
- Position: Defender

Youth career
- Borovo

Senior career*
Years	Team	Apps	(Gls)
1966–1972	Borovo		
1972–1979	Vojvodina	152	(10)

International career
1976	Yugoslavia	1	(0)

Managerial career
- 1986: Vojvodina
- * Club domestic league appearances and goals

Željko Jurčić (born 21 July 1946) is a retired Serbo-Croatian football player and manager. He played as a defender for Borovo and Vojvodina throughout the 1970s. He also briefly represented his home country of Yugoslavia in 1976.

== Club career ==
Born in Borovo, Jurčić began playing for Borovo beginning in the 1966–67 Yugoslav Second League. He would contine playing within his native club until the conclusion of the 1971–72 Yugoslav Second League as he then found himself playing in the top-flight of Yugoslav football through his tenure with Vojvodina. Throughout his career with the club, he was part of the winning squad for the 1976–77 Mitropa Cup. By the time of his retirement in the 1978–79 Yugoslav First League, he had made around 152 appearances and scored 10 goals.

== International career ==
Jurčić was first called up to represent Yugoslavia within the amateur sector of the club in friendlies against Bulgaria and Hungary on 25 October and 21 November 1972 respectively. He was then called up for the senior team in a 3–0 away loss against Italy on 25 September 1976.

== Later life ==
Jurčić briefly served as manager of Vojvodina during the final rounds of the 1985–86 Yugoslav First League. He remained within the operations of the club however, as he was one of the key figures behind the organization of the U-18 Stevan Nešticki Tournament and remained present in its operations even with the outbreak of the COVID-19 pandemic in Serbia. He also visited the Football Association of Vojvodina alongside other players of his generation such as Radivoj Radosav and Dragoljub Bekvalac.
