= 2007–08 First League of the Republika Srpska =

Association football competition

The 2007–08 First League of the Republika Srpska season was the thirteenth since its establishment.

== Teams ==
Location of clubs in 1st League of RS 2007-08
- Borac Banja Luka
- Borac Šamac
- BSK Nektar Banja Luka
- Drina Zvornik
- Drina HE Višegrad
- Famos Vojkovići
- Jedinstvo Crkvina
- Kozara Gradiška
- Ljubić Prnjavor
- Mladost Gacko
- Proleter Teslić
- Radnik Bijeljina
- Rudar Ugljevik
- Sloboda Novi Grad
- Sloga Doboj
- Sutjeska Foča

== League standings ==
Pos	Team	Pld	W	D	L	GF	GA	GD	Pts	Promotion or relegation
1	Borac Banja Luka (C, P)	30	21	4	5	62	29	+33	67	Promotion to Premijer Liga BiH
2	Sloga Doboj	30	16	5	9	60	41	+19	53	
3	Kozara	30	14	10	6	44	25	+19	52	
4	Sloboda Novi Grad	30	15	5	10	43	29	+14	50	
5	Famos Vojkovići	30	14	6	10	48	38	+10	48	
6	Sutjeska Foča	30	13	7	10	39	32	+7	46	
7	Ljubić	30	14	4	12	41	35	+6	46	
8	Drina Zvornik	30	12	9	9	43	32	+11	45	
9	Proleter Teslić	30	13	3	14	49	42	+7	42	
10	Drina Višegrad	30	13	2	15	38	48	−10	41	
11	Mladost Gacko	30	11	7	12	23	36	−13	40	
12	BSK	30	10	8	12	42	47	−5	38	
13	Radnik	30	10	7	13	39	36	+3	37	
14	Borac Šamac	30	8	8	14	30	44	−14	32	
15	Rudar Ugljevik (R)	30	5	9	16	22	47	−25	24	Relegation to Second League RS
16	Jedinstvo Crkvina (Note: 2 points deducted) (R)	30	1	6	23	14	76	−62	7	Relegation to Second League RS

Source: RSSSF.org
Rules for classification: 1) points; 2) goal difference; 3) number of goals scored.
(C) Champions; (P) Promoted; (R) Relegated
