= Brodac =

Brodac may refer to:

- Brodac Donji, a village in the city or municipality of Bijeljina, Bosnia-Herzegovina, east of adjacent village Brodac Gornji
- Brodac Gornji, a village in the city or municipality of Bijeljina, Bosnia-Herzegovina, west of adjacent village Broda Donji
- Brodac, Novo Sarajevo, in or near Sarajevo, in Bosnia-Herzegovina
