= Nenad Kutlačić =

Bosnian footballer

Personal information
- Full name: Nenad Kutlačić
- Date of birth: 4 March 1981 (age 45)
- Place of birth: Bijeljina, SFR Yugoslavia
- Height: 1.84 m (6 ft 0 in)
- Position: Defender

Youth career
- Radnik Bijeljina

Senior career*
Years	Team	Apps	(Gls)
1999–2002	Radnik Bijeljina		
2002–2006	Partizan	0	(0)
2002–2004	→ Rudar Ugljevik (loan)	42	(4)
2004–2005	→ Spartak Subotica (loan)		
2005–2006	→ Budućnost Banatski Dvor (loan)	15	(0)
2006	Banat Zrenjanin	11	(0)
2007–2009	Pandurii Târgu Jiu	3	(0)
2007–2008	→ Minerul Motru (loan)		
2008–2009	→ Râmnicu Vâlcea (loan)		
2010	Modriča	11	(0)
2010	Râmnicu Vâlcea		
2011	Drina Zvornik	9	(0)
2011	Limhamn Bunkeflo	9	(0)
2012	Radnik Bijeljina	4	(0)
2013–2018	Jedinstvo Brodac	20	(0)
Total		124	(4)

International career
2002–2003	Bosnia and Herzegovina U21	2	(0)
- * Club domestic league appearances and goals

Nenad Kutlačić (Cyrillic: Ненад Кутлачић; born 4 March 1981) is a Bosnian former professional footballer who played as a defender.

== Club career ==
After starting out with his hometown club Radnik Bijeljina, Kutlačić moved abroad to FR Yugoslavia champions Partizan in the summer of 2002. He never made an official debut for the team, but instead played on loan at Bosnian side Rudar Ugljevik (2002–2004), as well as two Serbian clubs, Spartak Subotica (2004–05) and Budućnost Banatski Dvor (2005–06).

In early 2007, Kutlačić was transferred to Romanian club Pandurii Târgu Jiu. He made three appearances in the second half of the 2006–07 Liga I season. Over the next two years, Kutlačić played on loan at Minerul Motru (Liga III, 2007–08) and Râmnicu Vâlcea (Liga II, 2008–09). He then returned to Pandurii and played for their reserve team, before being released by the club in late 2009.

After a brief spell in Sweden, Kutlačić returned to his parent club Radnik Bijeljina. He later played for Jedinstvo Brodac in the Second League of the Republika Srpska, making 20 appearances in the 2014–15 season.

== International career ==
Kutlačić was capped two times for the Bosnia and Herzegovina national under-21 football team during the 2004 UEFA European Under-21 Championship qualification.
