= Faris Zubanović =

Bosnian footballer (born 2000)

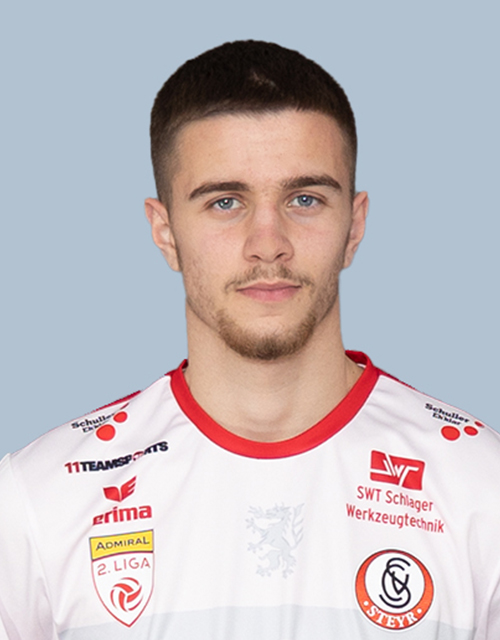
- Zubanović with Vorwärts Steyr in 2023

Personal information
- Date of birth: 12 June 2000 (age 26)
- Place of birth: Sarajevo, Bosnia and Herzegovina
- Height: 1.93 m (6 ft 4 in)
- Position: Forward

Team information
- Current team: Igman Konjic

Youth career
- 2011–2019: Željezničar

Senior career*
Years	Team	Apps	(Gls)
2018–2019	Željezničar	1	(0)
2019–2020	Fremad Amager	11	(1)
2020–2021	Tuzlaspor	0	(0)
2021–2022	Velež Mostar	13	(0)
2022	Bilje	10	(2)
2022–2023	Fužinar	10	(7)
2023	Vorwärts Steyr	3	(1)
2023–2024	Kapfenberg	2	(0)
2024	Željezničar	7	(2)
2024–2025	Famos Hrasnica		
2025	Wigry Suwałki	8	(2)
2025–	Igman Konjic	23	(5)

International career
2018	Bosnia and Herzegovina U19	2	(0)
2021	Bosnia and Herzegovina U21	4	(0)
- * Club domestic league appearances and goals as of 12 June 2026

Faris Zubanović (born 12 June 2000) is a Bosnian professional footballer who plays as a forward for First League of FBiH club Igman Konjic.

== Personal life ==
Faris is the son of Željezničar club legend Hadis Zubanović.

== Career statistics ==
As of match played 31 May 2025

Appearances and goals by club, season and competition
Club	Season	League			National cup (Note: Includes Turkish Cup, Bosnian Cup)		Continental		Total	
Club	Season	Division	Apps	Goals	Apps	Goals	Apps	Goals	Apps	Goals
Željezničar	2018–19	Bosnian Premier League	1	0	0	0	—		1	0
Fremad Amager	2019–20	Danish 1st Division	11	1	0	0	—		11	1
Tuzlaspor	2020–21	TFF First League	0	0	3	1	—		3	1
Velež Mostar	2020–21	Bosnian Premier League	6	0	0	0	—		6	0
Velež Mostar	2021–22	Bosnian Premier League	7	0	1	0	1	0	9	0
Velež Mostar	Total		13	0	1	0	1	0	15	0
Bilje	2021–22	Slovenian Second League	10	2	—		—		10	2
Fužinar	2022–23	Slovenian Second League	10	7	0	0	—		10	7
Vorwärts Steyr	2022–23	2. Liga	3	1	—		—		3	1
Kapfenberg	2023–24	2. Liga	2	0	0	0	—		2	0
Željezničar	2023–24	Bosnian Premier League	6	2	—		—		6	2
Željezničar	2024–25	Bosnian Premier League	1	0	0	0	—		1	0
Željezničar	Total		7	2	0	0	—		7	2
Famos Hrasnica	2024–25	Second League FBiH			1	0	—		1	0
Wigry Suwałki	2024–25	III liga, group I	8	2	—		—		8	2
Career total			65	15	5	1	1	0	71	16
