= Andrija Drljo =

Bosnian footballer (born 2002)

Personal information
- Date of birth: 6 September 2002 (age 24)
- Place of birth: Mostar, Bosnia and Herzegovina
- Height: 1.81 m (5 ft 11 in)
- Position: Winger

Youth career
- 2015–2019: Široki Brijeg
- 2019–2020: Dinamo Zagreb

Senior career*
Years	Team	Apps	(Gls)
2020–2022	MTK Budapest	7	(0)
2022	→ Szentlőrinc (loan)	11	(1)
2022	Zrinjski Mostar	6	(0)
2023–2024	Željezničar	35	(0)

International career
2018–2019	Bosnia and Herzegovina U17	11	(3)
2019	Bosnia and Herzegovina U18	4	(1)
2019–2021	Bosnia and Herzegovina U19	11	(1)
2021–2023	Bosnia and Herzegovina U21	12	(1)
- * Club domestic league appearances and goals as of 20 May 2024

Andrija Drljo (born 6 September 2002) is a Bosnian professional footballer who plays as a winger.

Born and raised in Bosnia and Herzegovina, he started his professional career at Hungarian club MTK Budapest, who loaned him to Szentlőrinc. In 2022, Drljo joined Bosnian Premier League club Zrinjski Mostar. In 2023, he signed for Željezničar.

== Club career ==
=== Early career ===
Drljo signed his first professional contract with Hungarian side MTK Budapest in October 2020, and played for the club in the Nemzeti Bajnokság I. He was loaned to Szentlőrinc for the remainder of the 2021–22 season.

On 15 July 2022, Drljo joined Bosnian Premier League club Zrinjski Mostar. He made his debut for the club in a 4–1 home win against Sarajevo on 4 September 2022.

=== Željezničar ===
On 19 January 2023, Drljo joined Željezničar on a two-and-a-half-year deal. He debuted and scored his first goal for the club in a Bosnian Cup game against Leotar on 18 February 2023.

Drljo left Željezničar in June 2024, following the end of the 2023–24 season.

== International career ==
Drljo represented Bosnia and Herzegovina on all youth levels.

== Career statistics ==
=== Club ===
As of match played 20 May 2024

Appearances and goals by club, season and competition
Club	Season	League			Cup		Continental		Total	
Club	Season	Division	Apps	Goals	Apps	Goals	Apps	Goals	Apps	Goals
MTK Budapest	2020–21	Nemzeti Bajnokság I	3	0	0	0	—		3	0
MTK Budapest	2021–22	Nemzeti Bajnokság I	4	0	2	0	—		6	0
MTK Budapest	Total		7	0	2	0	—		9	0
Szentlőrinc (loan)	2021–22	Nemzeti Bajnokság II	11	1	—		—		11	1
Zrinjski Mostar	2022–23	Bosnian Premier League	6	0	1	0	0	0	7	0
Željezničar	2022–23	Bosnian Premier League	13	0	4	1	—		17	1
Željezničar	2023–24	Bosnian Premier League	22	0	0	0	3	0	25	0
Željezničar	Total		35	0	4	1	3	0	42	1
Career total			59	1	7	1	3	0	69	2
