= Željko Buvač =

Bosnian footballer and manager (born 1961)

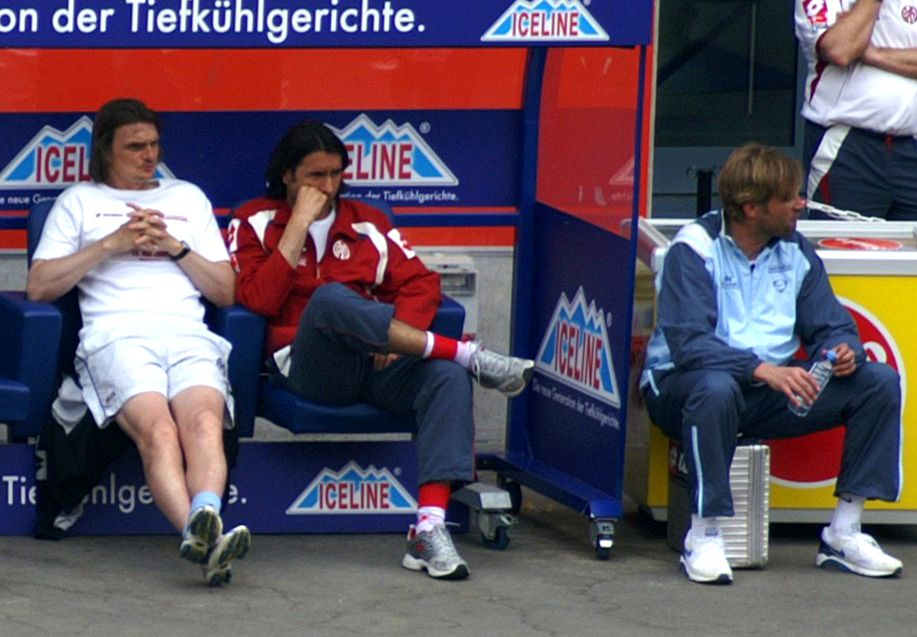
- Buvač (middle) with Stephan Kuhnert and Jürgen Klopp in 2006

Personal information
- Date of birth: 13 September 1961 (age 65)
- Place of birth: Prijedor, PR Bosnia and Herzegovina, FPR Yugoslavia
- Height: 1.92 m (6 ft 4 in)
- Position: Attacking midfielder

Team information
- Current team: Dynamo Moscow (sporting director)

Senior career*
Years	Team	Apps	(Gls)
1985–1986	Rudar Ljubija	2	(0)
1986–1991	Borac Banja Luka	100	(14)
1991–1992	Rot-Weiß Erfurt	21	(8)
1992–1995	Mainz 05	91	(13)
1995–1998	Neukirchen	133	(15)
Total		347	(50)

Managerial career
- 1998–2001: Neukirchen
- 2001–2008: Mainz 05 (assistant)
- 2008–2015: Borussia Dortmund (assistant)
- 2015–2018: Liverpool (assistant)
- 2020–: Dynamo Moscow (sporting director)
- * Club domestic league appearances and goals

Željko Buvač (Serbian Cyrillic: Жељко Бувач; born 13 September 1961) is a Bosnian football manager and former professional player who is the sporting director of Dynamo Moscow. He is the former assistant manager of Premier League club Liverpool, a role he took in 2015 but left in April 2018.

Former Liverpool manager Jürgen Klopp labelled Buvač as "the brain" in his coaching team, while describing himself as "the heart" and the second assistant coach, Peter Krawietz, as "the eye".

Buvač has been credited with developing the high-speed attacking style that brought success at Borussia Dortmund.

== Playing career ==
Buvač was born in Omarska, SR Bosnia and Herzegovina within Yugoslavia to ethnic Serb parents. He played for FK Borac Banja Luka in the Yugoslav First League. While playing for Borac, in 1988, he won the Yugoslav Cup.

In 1991, he moved to Germany and played with Rot-Weiß Erfurt and Mainz 05 in the 2. Bundesliga. From 1995 to 1998, Buvač played for SC Neukirchen, where he ended his playing career in 1998 at the age of 37.

== Managerial career ==
After retiring, Buvač became a manager. He finished his playing career with SC Neukirchen in 1998, and he took charge of the club soon after hanging up his boots. In 2001, after three seasons at Neukirchen, he became assistant manager of another of his former clubs, Mainz 05, where he joined friend, former teammate, and Mainz manager Jürgen Klopp. During his seven years at the club they achieved promotion to the Bundesliga, and later earned European qualification.

In 2008, he moved with Klopp to become assistant manager at Borussia Dortmund. Described by Klopp as his "right hand", Buvač helped lead Dortmund to back-to-back Bundesliga wins in 2011 and 2012, as well as the DFB-Pokal in 2012, the DFL-Supercup in 2008, 2013 and 2014, and their second appearance in a Champions League final in 2013. In 2013, while still at Dortmund, Buvač also became the head coach of the Republika Srpska official football team.

In October 2015, he joined newly appointed manager Klopp and took up the role of assistant manager at Premier League club Liverpool.

On 30 April 2018, Liverpool announced that Buvač was to take a leave of absence for the rest of the 2017–18 season for personal reasons. It was later announced that he had left the club permanently. Both Buvač and Klopp said their relationship had changed.

On 1 February 2020, Buvač was appointed sporting director by the Russian club Dynamo Moscow. On 14 December 2021, he extended his contract with Dynamo until the summer of 2024. On 1 March 2024, the contract was extended until June 2026. On 26 April 2026, he extended the contract until 2029.

== Managerial statistics ==
As of 26 May 2001

Managerial record by team and tenure
Team	From	To	Record				
Team	From	To	G	W	D	L	Win %
Neukirchen	July 1998	June 2001	66	37	12	17	56.06
Total			66	37	12	17	56.06

== Honours ==
=== Player ===
Borac Banja Luka

- Yugoslav Cup: 1987–88

=== As assistant manager ===
Mainz 05

- 2. Bundesliga promotion: 2003–04

Borussia Dortmund

- Bundesliga: 2010–11, 2011–12
- DFB-Pokal: 2011–12
- DFL-Supercup: 2013, 2014
- UEFA Champions League runner-up: 2012–13

Liverpool

- Football League Cup runner-up: 2015–16
- UEFA Champions League runner-up: 2017–18
- UEFA Europa League runner-up: 2015–16
