= FK Jedinstvo Mali Zvornik =

FK Jedinstvo
- Full name: Fudbalski Klub Jedinstvo Mali Zvornik
- Nicknames: Plavi(The Blues); Drinski labudovi (The Drina swans); Plava munja (The Blue lightning); Električari (The Electricians)
- Founded: 2 July 1967; 58 years ago
- Ground: FK Jedinstvo Stadium
- Capacity: 331 (all seated)
- League: Inter-municipal league Jadar
- 2024–25: Loznica municipal league - group A, 2nd (promoted)
Home colours	Away colours

FK Jedinstvo is a Serbian football club based in Mali Zvornik, Serbia and it is competing in Inter-municipal League Jadar, the 6th tier in Serbian football pyramid. The most successful period Jedinstvo had in '80s of previous century when they participated in 4th tier of competition on Republical level in Yugoslavian football system. Some of the famous players who spent early years of their careers in this club are Milinko Pantić, Nemanja Stevanović, Slaviša Radović, Edin Rustemović and Filip Erić.

== History ==
The football club Jedinstvo had been founded on 2 July in 1967, only 12 years after Mali Zvornik municipality was formed. The club had several short time-lasting predecessors under different names mainly related to nearby hydroelectric power plant, but in the end foundators agreed that the name of the club will be Jedinstvo (Unity or United), popular name of the Yugoslavian clubs formed during communist period. Also the ethnic structure of the population in the town in initial years of the club had been based on different nationalities so it may be a reason why authorities had chosen exactly this name. Stadium with one concrete stand, near the elementary and high school and very close to the Drina river bank will stay the home ground since the establishment until today. Jedinstvo stayed the symbol of the town and one of the main originator of social life in Mali Zvornik. The colours of the club remained blue and white during the whole 50 years.

== Successes ==
The most successful period of the club was in '80s, when Jedinstvo participated in 4th tier (Druga Srpska Liga) of Yugoslavian football system. During this time the Blues also had very good reputation and they played many friendly games with big and respectable Yugoslav clubs such are Eternal rivals FK Partizan and FK Crvena zvezda. After 90's and break-up of Yugoslavia club succeeded to reach the same level of competition (Posavska Zona) few more times but in smaller country. The most valuable trophies in which the club won in senior competition are two local Podrinje district cups in 1981. and 1983. Jedinstvo is officially one of 10 best clubs in Drina county in last century.

The most famous player who started career in the blue kit is Milinko Pantić who went in direct transfer in 1985. to Partizan Belgrade where he won two titles and one cup during the six seasons. Pantić also won double for Atletico Madrid in season 1995-96 and became UEFA Champions League Top scorer in 1996–97. The biggest legend of the club is Milorad Bato Stajić who scored 244 goals on 333 official matches and who was the captain of the squad for many years.

== Recent years ==
In the last 20 years the club competes mostly in lower divisions as a jo-jo club, in relation between 5th and 6th tiers of competition. Since the club is public, ambitions mainly depend on financial structure made by local authorities, which is not sufficient for making an important result on a pitch. According to financial situation club based on promoting young players and signing the experienced ones from Drina county, but unfortunately quality of the squad stayed on amateur level.

Jedinstvo has close connection with nearby FK Drina Zvornik in Zvornik across the Drina river and there are many players who played for both sides at some point. Also there is a local rivalry against opponents in Drina county FK Drina Ljubovija and FK Rađevac but since the divisions in which these clubs compete did not match in recent years the rivalry is less than it was in the years before 2010s. Jedinstvo also used to organise an annual pre-season friendly tournament named Čika Aćo i Nenad which attracted lot of respectable clubs from the region. The Blues also have an active squad of veterans who occasionally play friendly games.

=== Recent league history ===
Season	Division	P	W	D	L	F	A	Pts	Pos
2020–21	6 - Intermunicipal league Jadar	26	21	3	2	86	23	66	1st
2021–22	5 - Mačva District League	30	12	4	14	48	69	40	9th
2022–23	5 - Mačva District League	30	9	2	19	54	66	29	13th
2024–25	7 - Loznica municipal league - group A	18	12	3	3	48	12	39	2nd

== Youth school ==
The club also became known for work with youths in last few decades. Many players who reached respectable level of football in highest national leagues started playing in Jedinstvo and some of them are Nemanja Stevanović, Edin Rustemović, Slaviša Radović, Filip Erić and Vladimir Molerović. Lot of talented young players from the school often sign for the clubs with the best youth facilities in country, such are FK Partizan, FK Crvena zvezda, FK Vojvodina, FK Rad and OFK Beograd. Every year club organizes youth tournament and camp under the name of Milorad Bato Stajić with more than 150 kids and the best youth clubs in region participating. Jedinstvo is also represented in all important regional football and futsal cups.

== Community ==
The club and municipality are organisers of annual summer outdoor futsal cup which attracts lot of visitors and it is part of local summer festival. Jedinstvo also has a song which fans dedicated to the club with lyrics Napred Jedinstvo, navijači zovu, Napred Jedinstvo u pobedu novu (Go ahead Jedinstvo, the fans are calling, Go ahead Jedinstvo, to another victory).
