= Nemanja Stevanović =

Serbian footballer

Personal information
- Date of birth: 8 May 1992 (age 34)
- Place of birth: Loznica, FR Yugoslavia
- Height: 1.82 m (6 ft 0 in)
- Position: Goalkeeper

Youth career
- Jedinstvo Mali Zvornik
- 2007–2010: Rad

Senior career*
Years	Team	Apps	(Gls)
2011	BASK	17	(0)
2012–2016	Čukarički	68	(0)
2016–2026	Partizan	39	(0)
2017	→ Teleoptik (loan)	0	(0)
2018	→ Rad (loan)	15	(0)
2018–2019	→ Čukarički (loan)	33	(0)
2025–2026	→ Teleoptik (loan)	16	(0)
- * Club domestic league appearances and goals as of 29 July 2026

Nemanja Stevanović (Serbian Cyrillic: Немања Стевановић; born 8 May 1992) is a Serbian professional footballer who plays as a goalkeeper.

== Career ==
Stevanović played with Jedinstvo Mali Zvornik, Rad, BASK, and Čukarički between 2012 and 2016. He saved two penalties from Bojan Božović on his Serbian SuperLiga debut against Napredak Kruševac on 9 August 2014.

Stevanović was declared as the best goalkeeper for the first half of the 2015–16 season.

On 29 July 2016, Stevanović signed four-year contract with Partizan.

On 31 August 2017, Stevanović moved on six-month loan deal to Teleoptik.

== Career statistics ==
As of 18 June 2025

Appearances and goals by club, season and competition
Club	Season	League			Cup		Continental		Total	
Club	Season	Division	Apps	Goals	Apps	Goals	Apps	Goals	Apps	Goals
BASK	2010–11	Serbian First League	3	0	—		—		3	0
BASK	2011–12	Serbian League Belgrade	14	0	1	0	—		15	0
BASK	Total		17	0	1	0	—		18	0
Čukarički	2011–12	Serbian First League	3	0	—		—		3	0
Čukarički	2012–13	Serbian First League	3	0	—		—		3	0
Čukarički	2013–14	Serbian SuperLiga	0	0	0	0	—		0	0
Čukarički	2014–15	Serbian SuperLiga	24	0	6	0	0	0	30	0
Čukarički	2015–16	Serbian SuperLiga	37	0	2	0	4	0	43	0
Čukarički	2016–17	Serbian SuperLiga	1	0	—		4	0	5	0
Čukarički	Total		68	0	8	0	8	0	84	0
Partizan	2016–17	Serbian SuperLiga	4	0	3	0	—		7	0
Partizan	2017–18	Serbian SuperLiga	0	0	0	0	0	0	0	0
Partizan	2018–19	Serbian SuperLiga	0	0	0	0	0	0	0	0
Partizan	2019–20	Serbian SuperLiga	2	0	4	0	0	0	6	0
Partizan	2020–21	Serbian SuperLiga	2	0	2	0	0	0	4	0
Partizan	2021–22	Serbian SuperLiga	20	0	5	0	2	0	27	0
Partizan	2022–23	Serbian SuperLiga	9	0	0	0	1	0	10	0
Partizan	2023–24	Serbian SuperLiga	1	0	1	0	0	0	2	0
Partizan	2024–25	Serbian SuperLiga	0	0	0	0	0	0	0	0
Partizan	Total		39	0	15	0	3	0	57	0
Teleoptik (loan)	2017–18	Serbian First League	0	0	—		—		0	0
Rad (loan)	2017–18	Serbian SuperLiga	15	0	—		—		15	0
Čukarički (loan)	2018–19	Serbian SuperLiga	33	0	—		—		33	0
Career total			172	0	24	0	11	0	207	0

== Honours ==
BASK

- Serbian First League: 2010–11

Čukarički

- Serbian Cup: 2014–15

Partizan

- Serbian SuperLiga: 2016–17
- Serbian Cup: 2016–17
