= Matija Gluščević =

Serbian association football player

Personal information
- Full name: Matija Gluščević
- Date of birth: 13 June 2004 (age 22)
- Place of birth: Kraljevo, Serbia and Montenegro
- Height: 1.82 m (6 ft 0 in)
- Position: Right winger

Team information
- Current team: Al-Ettifaq
- Number: 71

Youth career
- Red Star Belgrade

Senior career*
Years	Team	Apps	(Gls)
2020–2021	Red Star Belgrade	0	(0)
2020–2021	→ Grafičar Beograd (loan)	4	(0)
2022	Proleter Novi Sad	4	(0)
2023–2025	Radnički 1923	60	(6)
2025–	Al-Ettifaq	13	(0)

International career^{‡}
2019	Serbia U15	1	(1)
2019	Serbia U16	3	(0)
2020	Serbia U17	2	(1)
2020–2021	Serbia U18	3	(1)
2021–2022	Serbia U19	2	(0)
2024–	Serbia U21	3	(0)
- * Club domestic league appearances and goals as of 5 November 2026 ‡ National team caps and goals as of 17 March 2025

Matija Gluščević (Serbian Cyrillic: Матија Глушчевић; born 13 June 2004) is a Serbian professional footballer who plays as a right winger for Saudi club Al-Ettifaq.

== Club career ==
Born in Kraljevo, Gluščević started his football career at FK Apolon 4 before being trained at one of the country's biggest Serbian clubs, Red Star Belgrade. However, he began his career at Grafičar Beograd, where he was loaned from 2019 to 2020. It was with this club that he played his first professional match on October 12, 2020, during a Serbian Super League match, against Kolubara. He came into play and the two teams drew each other (final score 0-0)

In July 2023, after a few months without a club, Gluščević joined Radnički 1923, signing a contract running until December 2026.

He is one of the revelations of the Serbian Super League championship in the 2023–24 Serbian SuperLiga season, in a team fighting for a European place, alongside talented young players like Milutin Vidosavljević and Milan Aleksić.

On 9 September 2025, it was announced that Gluščević would be joining Saudi Arabian club Al-Ettifaq on a three-year deal.

== International career ==
With the Serbia U17, he played two matches and scored one goal in 2020.

Gluščević made his first appearance for the Serbia U21 team against Luxembourg U21 on March 22, 2024. He came on as a substitute and the two teams drew 1-1.

== Career statistics ==
As of 10 January 2022

Club	Season	League			Cup		Continental		Total	
Club	Season	Division	Apps	Goals	Apps	Goals	Apps	Goals	Apps	Goals
Grafičar Beograd (loan)	2020–21	Serbian First League	4	0	1	0	–		5	0
Proleter Novi Sad	2021–22	Serbian SuperLiga	0	0	0	0	–		0	0
Career total			4	0	1	0	0	0	5	0
