= Slaviša Radović =

Bosnian professional footballer (born 1993)

Personal information
- Date of birth: 8 October 1993 (age 33)
- Place of birth: Zvornik, Bosnia and Herzegovina
- Height: 1.80 m (5 ft 11 in)
- Position: Left-back

Team information
- Current team: Radnik Bijeljina
- Number: 3

Youth career
- Jedinstvo Mali Zvornik

Senior career*
Years	Team	Apps	(Gls)
2011–2013	Lokomotiva Beograd		
2013–2014	Drina Zvornik	34	(1)
2015	Vojvodina	6	(0)
2016	Olimpik Sarajevo	9	(0)
2016	Voždovac	3	(0)
2017	Zemun	0	(0)
2017–2020	Radnik Bijeljina	68	(0)
2020–2022	Velež Mostar	48	(1)
2022–2023	Liepāja	11	(0)
2023–2024	Sarajevo	34	(2)
2024	Sumgayit	4	(0)
2024–2025	Radnički 1923	15	(1)
2025	Posušje	12	(0)
2026–	Radnik Bijeljina	24	(0)

International career
2013–2014	Republika Srpska U23		
2014–2015	Republika Srpska		
- * Club domestic league appearances and goals as of 31 October 2026

Slaviša Radović (Serbian Cyrillic: Славиша Радовић; born 8 October 1993) is a Bosnian-Serbian professional footballer who plays as a left-back for Bosnian Premier League club Radnik Bijeljina.

== Club career ==
Born in Zvornik, Bosnia and Herzegovina, Radović started his career playing in Serbian clubs Jedinstvo Mali Zvornik and Lokomotiva Beograd, before joining hometown club Drina Zvornik where he played in the Bosnian Premier League, becoming a standard defensive player.

During the winter break of the 2014–15 season, Radović returned to Serbia, this time by joining top-flight side Vojvodina. He made his debut in the 2014–15 Serbian SuperLiga on 29 April 2015, in a game against Voždovac. On 12 January 2016, Vojvodina and Radović mutually terminated the contract.

On 20 January 2016, he signed a one-and-a-half-year deal with Olimpik. After Olimpik, he again went back to Serbia and played for Voždovac and Zemun, before signing with Radnik Bijeljina on 29 May 2017. Radović left Radnik in June 2020 after his contract with the club expired, winning three Republika Srpska Cups during his time at the club.

On 5 August 2020, he signed a two-year contract with Velež Mostar. Radović made his official debut for Velež in a league match win against Krupa on 15 August 2020.

On 1 July 2022, he signed for Latvian club Liepāja. After half a season, he left the club.

On 16 January 2023, he returned to Bosnia and signed for Sarajevo.

On September 10, 2024, Radnički 1923 announced that they had signed a one-year contract with Radović.

== International career ==
Radović was part of the Republika Srpska official football team from 2013 to 2014 and after that a member of the Republika Srpska official under-23 team from 2014 to 2015.

== Career statistics ==
=== Club ===
As of match played 31 October 2026

Appearances and goals by club, season and competition
Club	Season	League			National cup (Note: Includes Bosnian Cup, Serbian Cup, Latvian Cup)		Continental		Total	
Club	Season	Division	Apps	Goals	Apps	Goals	Apps	Goals	Apps	Goals
Drina Zvornik	2014–15	Bosnian Premier League	13	0	0	0	—		13	0
Vojvodina	2014–15	Serbian SuperLiga	3	0	0	0	0	0	3	0
Vojvodina	2015–16	Serbian SuperLiga	3	0	0	0	1 (Note: Appearance(s) in UEFA Europa League)	0	4	0
Vojvodina	Total		6	0	0	0	1	0	7	0
Olimpik	2015–16	Bosnian Premier League	9	0	0	0	0	0	9	0
Voždovac	2016–17	Serbian SuperLiga	3	0	2	0	—		5	0
Zemun	2016–17	Serbian First League	0	0	0	0	—		0	0
Radnik Bijeljina	2017–18	Bosnian Premier League	22	0	1	0	—		23	0
Radnik Bijeljina	2018–19	Bosnian Premier League	27	0	2	0	—		29	0
Radnik Bijeljina	2019–20	Bosnian Premier League	19	0	1	0	2	0	22	0
Radnik Bijeljina	Total		68	0	4	0	2	0	74	0
Velež Mostar	2020–21	Bosnian Premier League	21	0	2	0	—		23	0
Velež Mostar	2021–22	Bosnian Premier League	27	1	7	2	5 (Note: Appearance(s) in UEFA Europa Conference League)	1	39	4
Velež Mostar	Total		48	1	9	2	5	1	62	4
Liepāja	2022	Latvian Higher League	9	0	1	0	1	0	11	0
Sarajevo	2022–23	Bosnian Premier League	11	0	0	0	—		11	0
Sarajevo	2023–24	Bosnian Premier League	23	2	3	0	1	0	27	2
Sarajevo	Total		34	2	3	0	1	0	38	2
Sumgayit	2024–25	Azerbaijan Premier League	4	0	—		2	0	6	0
Radnički 1923	2024–25	Serbian SuperLiga	15	1	2	0	—		17	1
Posušje	2025–26	Bosnian Premier League	12	0	1	0	—		13	0
Radnik Bijeljina	2025–26	Bosnian Premier League	15	0	2	0	—		17	0
Radnik Bijeljina	2026–27	Bosnian Premier League	9	0	1	0	—		10	0
Radnik Bijeljina	Total		24	0	3	0	—		27	0
Career total			245	4	25	2	12	1	282	7

== Honours ==
Drina Zvornik

- First League of RS: 2013–14

Radnik Bijeljina

- Republika Srpska Cup: 2016–17, 2017–18, 2018–19

Velež Mostar

- Bosnian Cup: 2021–22
