= Anastasios Tselios =

Greek footballer

Personal information
- Full name: Anastasios Andreas Tselios
- Date of birth: 14 October 2002 (age 24)
- Place of birth: Thessaloniki, Greece
- Height: 1.72 m (5 ft 8 in)
- Positions: Left winger; attacking midfielder

Team information
- Current team: Anagennisi Karditsa
- Number: 11

Youth career
- 2010–2018: PAOK
- 2018–2019: Aris Thessaloniki
- 2019–2021: Olympiacos

Senior career*
Years	Team	Apps	(Gls)
2021–2024	Olympiacos B	40	(3)
2024–2025	Radnički 1923	3	(0)
2025–2026	Niki Volos	5	(1)
2026–	Anagennisi Karditsa	0	(0)
- * Club domestic league appearances and goals as of 24 January 2026

Anastasios Andreas Tselios (Greek: Αναστάσιος-Ανδρέας Τσέλιος; born 14 October 2002) is a Greek professional footballer who plays as a midfielder for Super League 2 club Anagennisi Karditsa.

== Career statistics ==
Club	Season	League			Cup		Continental		Other		Total	
Club	Season	Division	Apps	Goals	Apps	Goals	Apps	Goals	Apps	Goals	Apps	Goals
Olympiacos B	2021–22	Super League Greece 2	16	0	0	0	0	0	0	0	16	0
Olympiacos B	2022–23	Super League Greece 2	9	0	0	0	0	0	0	0	9	0
Olympiacos B	2023–24	Super League Greece 2	15	3	0	0	0	0	0	0	15	3
Career total			40	3	0	0	0	0	0	0	40	3
