= Karlo Kamenar =

Croatian footballer

Personal information
- Date of birth: 15 March 1994 (age 32)
- Place of birth: Zagreb, Croatia
- Height: 1.74 m (5 ft 8 1/2 in)
- Position: Midfielder

Team information
- Current team: Rudeš
- Number: 10

Youth career
- Dubrava
- Davor Šuker N. Akademija
- 2004–2011: Dinamo Zagreb
- 2012–2013: Lokomotiva

Senior career*
Years	Team	Apps	(Gls)
2013–2014	Stupnik	27	(6)
2014–2018	Rudeš	95	(8)
2018–2020	Osijek	18	(1)
2020	→ Žalgiris (loan)	5	(1)
2021	Mezőkövesd	3	(0)
2021–2023	Zrinjski Mostar	40	(3)
2023–2025	Posušje	44	(6)
2025–	Rudeš	29	(4)

International career
2010	Croatia U17	2	(0)
- * Club domestic league appearances and goals as of 16 June 2026

Karlo Kamenar (born 15 March 1994 Zagreb) is a Croatian professional footballer who plays as a midfielder for Rudeš.

== Club career ==
Having passed through the ranks of the GNK Dinamo Zagreb youth academy, playing with the likes of Mateo Kovačić, Kamenar was moved to NK Lokomotiva's U19 side, where he completed his youth career without being subsequently given a senior contract with the club. He moved to third-tier NK Stupnik before moving on to second-tier NK Rudeš where, in his fourth season with the club, he achieved promotion to the Prva HNL, the first in the club's history.

In July 2017, Kamenar made NK Rudeš club history by being the first player to score a top-tier goal for the club.

Following a successful season at the club and good performances against higher-ranked teams, having scored 5 goals in 32 league matches, Kamenar was snapped up by NK Osijek in June 2018.

In August 2020, Kamenar became a member of Lithuanian FK Žalgiris. In June 2023, Kamenar signed with Posušje.

== International career ==
Kamenar played in two friendly matches for the Croatia U17 in August 2010.

== Honours ==
Rudeš

- 2. HNL: 2016–17

Žalgiris

- A Lyga: 2020

Zrinjski Mostar

- Bosnian Premier League: 2021–22
