= Ajdin Mulalić =

Bosnian footballer (born 1994)

Personal information
- Date of birth: 13 September 1994 (age 32)
- Place of birth: Bužim, Bosnia and Herzegovina
- Height: 1.87 m (6 ft 2 in)
- Position: Goalkeeper

Team information
- Current team: Triglav Kranj

Youth career
- Vitez Bužim
- 2011–2013: Domžale
- 2011: → Slovan (youth loan)

Senior career*
Years	Team	Apps	(Gls)
2011–2023	Domžale	142	(0)
2011	→ Slovan (loan)	1	(0)
2014–2015	→ Zarica Kranj (loan)	37	(0)
2016–2017	→ Ilirija 1911 (loan)	24	(0)
2023–2024	Željezničar	0	(0)
2024	→ Rogaška (loan)	17	(0)
2024–2025	Domžale	14	(0)
2025–	Triglav Kranj	0	(0)
- * Club domestic league appearances and goals as of 3 July 2025

Ajdin Mulalić (born 13 September 1994) is a Bosnian professional footballer who plays as a goalkeeper for Triglav Kranj.

Mulalić started his professional career with Slovenian PrvaLiga side Domžale, and was also loaned to lower division sides Slovan, Zarica Kranj and Ilirija 1911. After over ten years with Domžale, Mulalić returned to his homeland and joined Željezničar in 2023, who loaned him to Rogaška in 2024.

== Honours ==
Domžale

- Slovenian Cup: 2016–17

Rogaška

- Slovenian Cup: 2023–24
