= Milan Aleksić (footballer) =

Serbian footballer

Personal information
- Date of birth: 30 August 2005 (age 21)
- Place of birth: Kragujevac, Serbia and Montenegro
- Height: 1.79 m (5 ft 10 in)
- Position: Left winger

Team information
- Current team: Partizan (on loan from Sunderland)
- Number: 17

Youth career
- –2021: Čukarički
- 2021–2023: Partizan

Senior career*
Years	Team	Apps	(Gls)
2023–2024	Radnički 1923	30	(2)
2024–	Sunderland	8	(0)
2025–2026	→ Cracovia (loan)	6	(0)
2026–	→ Partizan (loan)	16	(2)

International career^{‡}
2022–2023	Serbia U18	5	(0)
2024	Serbia U19	3	(0)
2025–	Serbia U21	11	(1)
- * Club domestic league appearances and goals as of 17:32, 22 November 2026 (UTC) ‡ National team caps and goals as of 21:43, 18 November 2025 (UTC)

Milan Aleksić (Serbian Cyrillic: Милан Алексић; born 30 August 2005) is a Serbian professional footballer who plays as a left winger for Serbian SuperLiga club Partizan, on loan from Premier League club Sunderland.

== Club career ==
On 31 August 2024, Aleksić joined EFL Championship club Sunderland on a four-year contract for an undisclosed fee, reported to be around £3,100,000. On 23 November 2024, Aleksić made his Sunderland and Championship debut as a substitute in a 1–1 draw against Millwall. He scored his first goal for Sunderland against Stoke City; he came on as a substitute in the 60th minute for Chris Rigg and scored within just four minutes in the third round of the FA Cup on 11 January 2025.

On 5 September 2025, Aleksić moved to Polish Ekstraklasa club Cracovia on a season-long loan, with an option to buy. He made eight appearances across all competitions before returning to Sunderland on 25 January 2026.

== International career ==
After representing Serbia at the U18 and U19 levels, he received a call-up to the senior national team by coach Dragan Stojković Piksi at the age of 18, for the 2024–25 UEFA Nations League A matches against Spain and Denmark on 5 and 8 September 2024, respectively.

== Career statistics ==
As of match played 22 November 2026

Appearances and goals by club, season and competition
Club	Season	League			National cup (Note: Includes Serbian Cup, FA Cup, Polish Cup)		League cup (Note: Includes EFL Cup)		Europe		Other		Total	
Club	Season	Division	Apps	Goals	Apps	Goals	Apps	Goals	Apps	Goals	Apps	Goals	Apps	Goals
Radnički 1923	2023–24	Serbian SuperLiga	25	2	4	2	—		—		—		29	4
Radnički 1923	2024–25	Serbian SuperLiga	5	0	—		—		2 (Note: Appearances in UEFA Conference League)	2	—		7	2
Radnički 1923	Total		30	2	4	2	—		2	2	—		36	6
Sunderland	2024–25	Championship	8	0	1	1	—		—		0	0	9	1
Sunderland	2025–26	Premier League	0	0	0	0	1	0	—		—		1	0
Sunderland	Total		9	0	1	1	1	0	—		—		10	1
Cracovia (loan)	2025–26	Ekstraklasa	6	0	2	0	—		—		—		8	0
Partizan (loan)	2026–27	Serbian SuperLiga	16	2	0	0	—		5	0	—		21	2
Career total			60	4	7	3	1	0	7	2	0	0	75	9
