= Stevan Nešticki Tournament =

Stevan Nesticki Tournament
- Founded: 1982
- Region: Southeast Europe
- Number of teams: 6 (finals)
- Current champions: (Serbia) FK Vojvodina

Stevan Nešticki Tournament is a football tournament for players U-17 or U-18. It is traditionally organised by FK Vojvodina at the football pitch of Vujadin Boškov Sports Centre in Novi Sad, Serbia. It is a memorial event in honor of tragically deceased FK Vojvodina`s player Stevan Nešticki. This is one of the stronger competitions in southeast Europe in these categories.

== History ==
Year	Winner	Runner-up	Third-place	Fourth-place	Fifth-place	Sixth-place
2018	(Serbia) Vojvodina	(Czech Republic) FC Slovacko	(Croatia) NK Rijeka	(Romania) ASU Politehnica	(Japan) FK Machida	(Russia) FC Dinamo Moscow
2017	(Serbia) Vojvodina	(Russia) FC Dinamo Moscow	Republika Srpska	(Hungary) Akademia CEAK FC	(North Macedonia) FK Vardar	(Romania) ASU Politehnika
2016	(Serbia) Vojvodina	(Republika Srpska) Republic of Srpska	(Serbia) Partizan	(Serbia) Red Star Belgrade	Romania	(Hungary) FC Vasas
2015	(Serbia) Partizan	(Serbia) Vojvodina	(Serbia) Red Star	(Bulgaria) Slavia Sofia	Republika Srpska	(Hungary) Puskás Academy
2014	(Serbia) Red Star	(Hungary) Puskás Academy	(Serbia) Partizan	(North Macedonia) Macedonia	(Serbia) Vojvodina	Republika Srpska
2013	(Hungary) Puskás Academy	(Serbia) Partizan	(Serbia) Vojvodina	(Serbia) Red Star	(Croatia) Osijek	Republika Srpska
2012	Republika Srpska	(Serbia) Partizan	(Serbia) Vojvodina	(Serbia) Red Star	(North Macedonia) Vardar	(Croatia) Osijek
2011	(Croatia) Osijek	(Serbia) Vojvodina	(Serbia) Partizan	(Serbia) Red Star	Republika Srpska	(Bosnia and Herzegovina) Sarajevo
