= Vahid Selimović =

Luxembourgish professional footballer (born 1997)

Personal information
- Date of birth: 3 April 1997 (age 29)
- Place of birth: Luxembourg City, Luxembourg
- Height: 1.91 m (6 ft 3 in)
- Position: Centre-back

Team information
- Current team: Iberia 1999
- Number: 4

Youth career
- –2005: Jeunesse Esch
- 2005–2015: Metz

Senior career*
Years	Team	Apps	(Gls)
2015–2018	Metz B	37	(3)
2017–2019	Metz	13	(0)
2019–2020	Apollon Limassol	21	(0)
2020–2022	OFI	27	(1)
2023	Gorica	8	(0)
2023–2024	Željezničar	14	(1)
2024–2026	Hermannstadt	32	(0)
2026–	Iberia 1999	14	(0)

International career^{‡}
2015	Luxembourg U15	2	(0)
2016	Serbia U19	1	(0)
2019–	Luxembourg	19	(1)
- * Club domestic league appearances and goals as of 6 June 2026 ‡ National team caps and goals as of 16 November 2026

Vahid Selimović (Serbian Cyrillic: Вахид Селимовић; born 3 April 1997) is a Luxembourgish professional footballer who plays as a centre-back for Erovnuli Liga club Iberia 1999 and the Luxembourg national team.

Born in Luxembourg, Selimović was a youth international for Serbia, but represents Luxembourg at the senior level.

== Club career ==
Selimović joined the Metz academy at the age of 8 in 2005, and spent his entire youth years with them, signing his first professional contract eleven years later on 4 July 2016. He made his professional debut for Metz in a 1–0 Coupe de la Ligue loss to Angers on 12 December 2017, and his Ligue 1 debut in a 3–1 win over Montpellier four days later.

In January 2019, Selimović signed a two-year contract with Apollon Limassol. On 8 August 2020, it was announced that he had moved to OFI in Greece. After OFI, he played for Slovenian side Gorica in the second part of the 2022–23 season.

On 13 September 2023, Selimović signed a two-year contract with Bosnian Premier League club Željezničar. He was sent off after a straight red card in his debut for Željezničar in a 2–0 away loss to Igman Konjic on 27 October 2023. On 26 November 2023, Selimović scored his first goal for the club, an equaliser 4 minutes into stoppage time against Posušje, helping his team to narrowly escape defeat in a 1–1 home draw. On 10 March 2024, he scored an own goal in a 2–1 away defeat to Zvijezda 09. Selimović mutually terminated his contract with Željezničar and left the club at the end of the 2023–24 season.

== International career ==
Selimović was born in Luxembourg and is of Bosniak and Serbian descent. He made his debut for the Serbia under-19 team in a 2–0 friendly win over Bulgaria in February 2016.

Selimović switched his national allegiance to Luxembourg in 2019, receiving his first call-up for the senior matches in June of that year.

== Career statistics ==
=== International ===
As of match played 16 November 2026

Appearances and goals by national team and year
National team	Year	Apps	Goals
Luxembourg	2019	2	1
Luxembourg	2020	5	0
Luxembourg	2021	3	0
Luxembourg	2022	1	0
Luxembourg	2023	0	0
Luxembourg	2024	1	0
Luxembourg	2025	2	0
Luxembourg	2026	5	0
Total		19	1

Scores and results list Luxembourg's goal tally first, score column indicates score after each Selimović goal.

List of international goals scored by Vahid Selimović
No.	Date	Venue	Opponent	Score	Result	Competition
1	2 June 2019	Stade Josy Barthel, Luxembourg City, Luxembourg	Madagascar	2–3	3–3	Friendly

== Honours ==
Hermannstadt

- Cupa României runner-up: 2024–25
