= Kilian Bevis =

Guadeloupean footballer (born 1998)

Personal information
- Full name: Bevis Kilian Zoé
- Date of birth: 13 February 1998 (age 28)
- Place of birth: Villepinte, France
- Height: 1.73 m (5 ft 8 in)
- Position: Attacking midfielder

Team information
- Current team: Wuhan Three Towns
- Number: 10

Youth career
- 2009-2010: FC Sevran
- 2010-2013: Centre de formation de football de Paris
- 2011-2013: INF Clairefontaine
- 2013-2017: US Torcy

Senior career*
Years	Team	Apps	(Gls)
2018–2019	Castelvetro Calcio	21	(4)
2019–2021	Messina	52	(8)
2021–2022	Birkirkara	22	(4)
2022–2023	Valletta	22	(6)
2023–2025	Radnički 1923	91	(17)
2026–	Wuhan Three Towns	25	(7)

International career^{‡}
2023–	Guadeloupe	12	(1)
- * Club domestic league appearances and goals as of 10:30, 8 November 2026 (UTC) ‡ National team caps and goals as of 17:12, 24 January 2026 (UTC)

Bevis Kilian Zoé (born 13 February 1998) is a professional footballer who plays as an attacking midfielder for Chinese Super League club Wuhan Three Towns. Born in metropolitan France, he plays for the Guadeloupe national team.

== Club career ==
Born in Villepinte, France, Bevis started his senior career in 2018 in Italy with Castelvetro. A year later, he joined Messina and played with them two seasons in the fourth Italian level. In summer 2021, he moved to Malta, where he joined Birkirkara, and a year later, his good performances earned him a move to Valletta. In summer 2023, after successful trials, he joined Serbian side Radnički 1923.

On 2 February 2026, Bevis joined Chinese Super League club Wuhan Three Towns.

== International career ==
In 2023, Bevis decided to play for Guadeloupe national team. He made his debut on 7 September that year in a 2–1 win over Saint Kitts & Nevis.

== Career statistics ==
=== Club ===
As of match played 8 November 2026

Appearances and goals by club, season and competition
Club	Season	League			Cup		Continental		Other		Total	
Club	Season	Division	Apps	Goals	Apps	Goals	Apps	Goals	Apps	Goals	Apps	Goals
Messina	2019–20	Serie D	25	5	4	1	—		—		29	6
Messina	2020–21	Serie D	27	3	—		—		0	0	27	3
Messina	Total		52	8	4	1	—		0	0	56	9
Birkirkara	2021–22	Maltese Premier League	22	4	2	1	—		—		24	5
Valletta	2022–23	Maltese Premier League	22	6	1	1	—		—		23	7
Radnički 1923	2023–24	Serbian SuperLiga	36	6	4	0	—		—		40	6
Radnički 1923	2024–25	Serbian SuperLiga	36	7	2	0	2	0	—		42	7
Radnički 1923	2025–26	Serbian SuperLiga	19	4	1	1	2	0	—		22	5
Radnički 1923	Total		91	17	7	1	4	0	—		102	18
Wuhan Three Towns	2026	Chinese Super League	25	7	1	0	—		—		26	7
career total			212	42	15	4	4	0	0	0	231	46

=== International ===
As of match played 24 June 2025

Appearances and goals by national team and year
National team	Year	Apps	Goals
Guadeloupe
Guadeloupe	2023	6	1
Guadeloupe	2024	3	0
Guadeloupe	2025	3	0
Total		12	1

Scores and results list Guadeloupe's goal tally first, score column indicates score after each Bevis goal.

List of international goals scored by Kilian Bevis
No.	Date	Venue	Opponent	Score	Result	Competition
1	19 November 2023	Stade Valette, Sainte-Anne, Guadeloupe	Saint Kitts and Nevis	3–0	5–0	2023–24 CONCACAF Nations League
