= Abdulhakeem Al-Tuwaijri =

Saudi Arabian football manager (born 1979)

Personal information
- Date of birth: 3 February 1979 (age 47)
- Place of birth: Saudi Arabia

Team information
- Current team: Zbrojovka Brno (youth coach)

Managerial career
- Years: Team
- 2023: Slavia Prague (assistant)
- 2023–2024: Željezničar
- 2026–2026: Zbrojovka Brno (youth)

Abdulhakeem Al-Tuwaijri (Arabic: عبدالحكيم التويجري; born 3 February 1979) is a Saudi Arabian professional football manager. He is the current head coach of Zbrojovka Brno U19.

Al-Tuwaijri started working at the professional level at the age of 44, having been manager of Bosnian club Željezničar for a brief period in late 2023. In 2026, he joined Czech side Zbrojovka Brno as head coach of the under-19 team.

== Career ==
=== Early career ===
Born in Saudi Arabia on 3 February 1979, Al-Tuwaijri was educated in the English, Scottish and Irish Football Associations. He has also obtained a UEFA Pro Licence, and has earned a master's degree in football management at the Johan Cruyff Institute in Barcelona as well.

Between February and June 2023, Al-Tuwaijri worked as an assistant manager at Czech First League club Slavia Prague.

=== Željezničar ===
Al-Tuwaijri was appointed as the manager of Bosnian Premier League side Željezničar on 7 November 2023, his first head coach experience. His first game in charge of Željezničar ended in a 3–2 away loss to Borac Banja Luka on 12 November. Following four more games with no real success and the side being just one place above the relegation zone, Al-Tuwaijri resigned as manager on 2 January 2024.

== Managerial statistics ==
As of match played 16 December 2023

Managerial record by team and tenure
Team	From	To	Record							
Team	From	To	G	W	D	L	GF	GA	GD	Win %
Željezničar	7 November 2023	2 January 2024	5	0	1	4	3	9	−6	0.00
Total			5	0	1	4	3	9	−6	0.00
