= FK Jedinstvo Brodac =

Jedinstvo Brodac
- Full name: Fudbalski klub Jedinstvo Brodac
- Founded: 1931
- Ground: Stadion RIBIN Brodac
- Capacity: 400
- Chairman: Duško Tojić
- Manager: Miroslav Timić – Čilša
- League: Second League RS - East
- 2020–21: Second League RS - East, 9th
Home colours	Away colours

Fudbalski klub Jedinstvo Brodac (Serbian Cyrillic: Фудбалски клуб Јединство Бpoдaц) is a football club based in Brodac, near Bijeljina, Republika Srpska, Bosnia and Herzegovina.

In July 2021 they celebrated 90 years of existence. The club has been competing in the Second League of the Republika Srpska group East since 2005.

== Club seasons ==
Season	League									Cup	Europe
Season	Division	P	W	D	L	F	A	Pts	Pos	Cup	Europe
2010–11	Second League of RS – East	26	10	5	11	44	44	35	9th		
2014–15	Second League of RS – East	26	11	8	7	53	44	41	2nd		
2015–16	Second League of RS – East	28	11	4	13	43	42	37	10th		
2016–17	Second League of RS – East	30	10	8	12	57	66	39	9th		
2017–18	Second League of RS – East	30	13	4	13	49	57	43	6th		
2018–19	Second League of RS – East	28	10	4	14	35	43	34	8th		
2019–20	Second League of RS – East	16	5	3	8	25	27	18	13th		
2020–21	Second League of RS – East	18	8	2	8	28	24	26	9th		

== External sources ==
- FK Jedinstvo Brodac at FSRS
