= Mehmed Ćosić =

Bosnian footballer (born 1997)

Personal information
- Date of birth: 25 June 1997 (age 29)
- Place of birth: Tuzla, Bosnia and Herzegovina
- Height: 1.77 m (5 ft 10 in)
- Positions: Right-back; right winger

Team information
- Current team: Radnički 1923
- Number: 8

Youth career
- –2015: Sloboda Tuzla

Senior career*
Years	Team	Apps	(Gls)
2015–2016	Sloboda Tuzla	1	(0)
2016	Radnički Lukavac	14	(3)
2017–2022	Velež Mostar	158	(11)
2023	Kolubara	15	(1)
2023–2024	Željezničar	15	(0)
2024–	Radnički 1923	76	(2)

International career
2021	Bosnia and Herzegovina	1	(0)
- * Club domestic league appearances and goals as of 5 June 2026

Mehmed Ćosić (born 25 June 1997) is a Bosnian professional footballer who plays as a right-back or right winger for Serbian SuperLiga club Radnički 1923.

== Club career ==
Born in Tuzla, Ćosić started playing with local clubs Sloboda and Radnički Lukavac, before moving to Velež Mostar where he stayed for six years and won a Bosnian Cup in 2022. In January 2023, he joined Serbian SuperLiga club Kolubara.

On 8 August 2023, Ćosić signed a two-year contract with Željezničar. In January 2024, he joined Serbian SuperLiga club Radnički 1923 on a two-year contract.

== International career ==
Ćosić made his debut for the Bosnia and Herzegovina national team in a friendly match against the United States on 18 December 2021.

== Honours ==
Velež Mostar

- First League of FBiH: 2018–19
- Bosnian Cup: 2021–22
