= Brodac Gornji =

Brodac Gornji Бродац Горњи (Serbian)
- Village (Selo)
- Location within Bosnia and Herzegovina
- Coordinates: 44°51′46.46″N 19°15′50.85″E
- Country: Bosnia and Herzegovina
- Entity: Republika Srpska
- City: Bijeljina

Population (2013)
  - Total: 810
- Time zone: UTC+1 (CET)
  - Summer (DST): UTC+2 (CEST)
- Postal code: 76300

Brodac Gornji (Serbian Cyrillic: Бродац Горњи) is a small village located north of the city of Bijeljina in Republika Srpska, Bosnia and Herzegovina.

== Sports ==
Local football club Jedinstvo play in Bosnia and Herzegovina's third tier-Second League of the Republika Srpska. Their host their home games at the Stadion RIBIN Brodac.
