= FK Proleter Dvorovi =

Proleter Dvorovi
- Full name: Fudbalski klub Proleter Dvorovi
- Founded: 1929
- Manager: Zivan Stevic
- League: Second League RS - East
- 2015–16: Second League RS - East, 7th
Home colours	Away colours

Fudbalski klub Proleter Dvorovi (Serbian Cyrillic: Фудбалски клуб Пpoлeтep Двopoви) is a football club from Dvorovi, Bijeljina, in Republika Srpska, Bosnia and Herzegovina. The club competes in the Second League of the Republika Srpska.

== Current squad ==
Note: Flags indicate national team as defined under FIFA eligibility rules; some limited exceptions apply. Players may hold more than one non-FIFA nationality.

No.	Pos.	Nation	Player
1	GK	(Bosnia and Herzegovina) BIH	Petar Simojlović
88	GK	(Bosnia and Herzegovina) BIH	Saša Krsmanić
5	DF	(Bosnia and Herzegovina) BIH	Miloš Milković
10	DF	(Bosnia and Herzegovina) BIH	Safet Omerbegić
14	DF	(Bosnia and Herzegovina) BIH	Vuk Milovanović
2	DF	(Bosnia and Herzegovina) BIH	Šiška Mikić
13	DF	(Bosnia and Herzegovina) BIH	Aleksandar Simeunović
23	DF	(Bosnia and Herzegovina) BIH	Radoš Baić

No.	Pos.	Nation	Player
8	MF	(Bosnia and Herzegovina) BIH	Nikola Vlačić
99	MF	(Bosnia and Herzegovina) BIH	Danijel Simeunović
6	MF	(Bosnia and Herzegovina) BIH	Borena Žilčić
19	MF	(Bosnia and Herzegovina) BIH	Marko Marković
24	MF	(Bosnia and Herzegovina) BIH	Nikša Kikić
7	FW	(Bosnia and Herzegovina) BIH	Nenad Jeftić
9	FW	(Bosnia and Herzegovina) BIH	Igor Marković
