= Dvorovi =

Town in Republika Srpska, Bosnia and Herzegovina

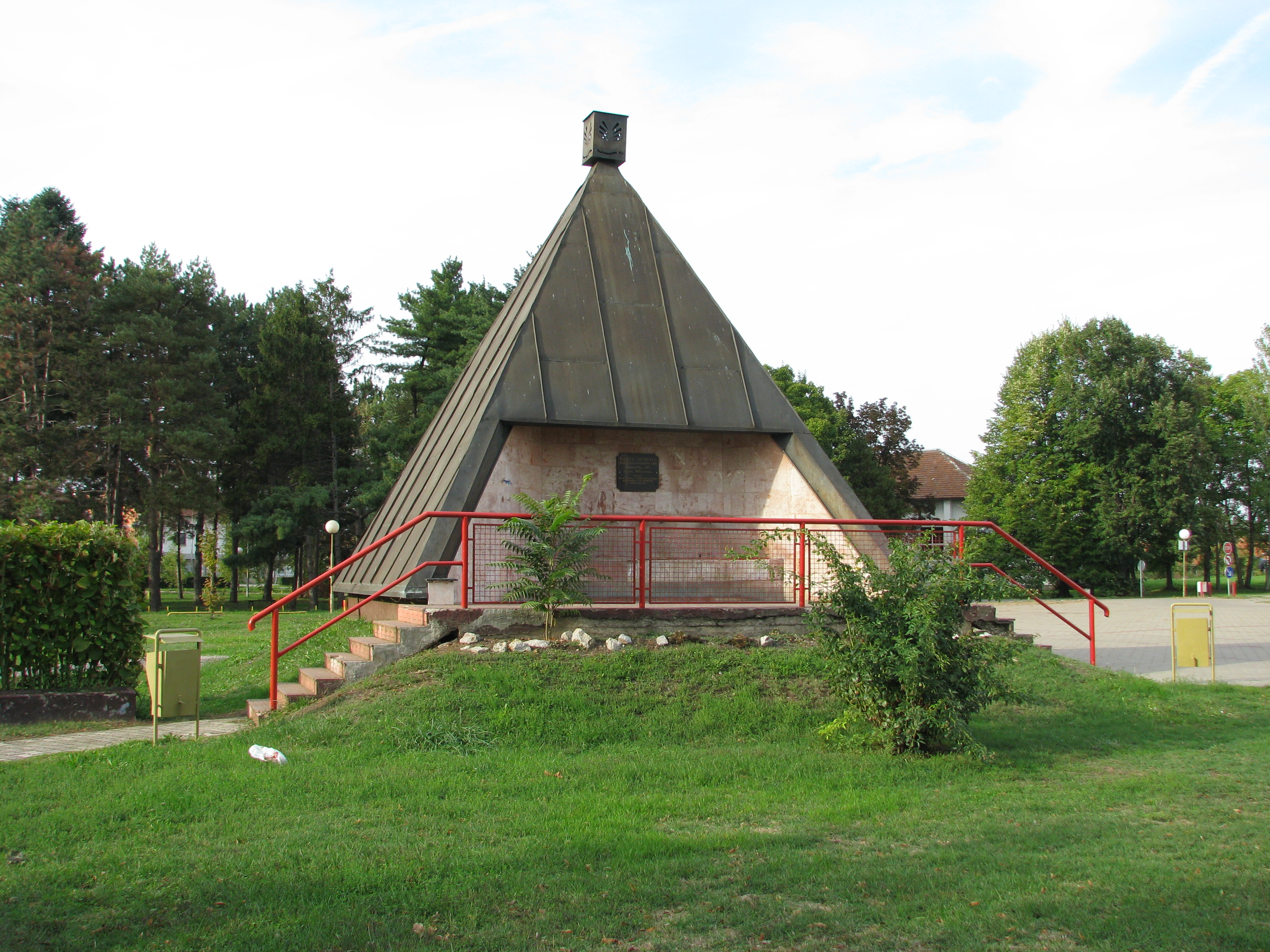
Dvorovi Spa (Banja Dvorovi)

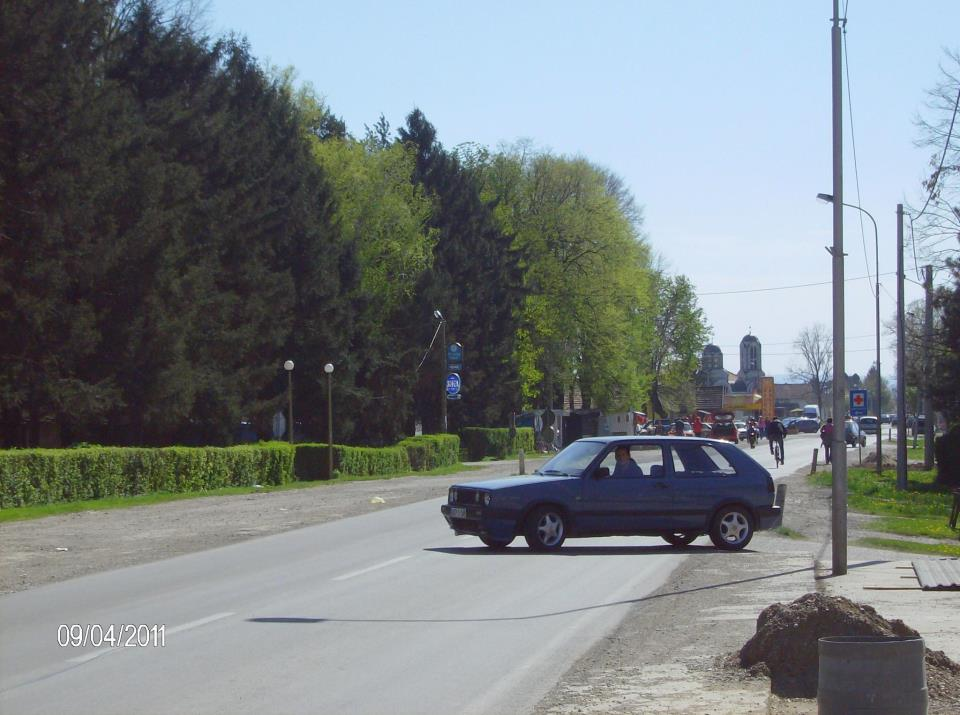
View towards the church from Dvorovi Spa

Dvorovi (Cyrillic: Дворови) is a town located just north of the city of Bijeljina in Republika Srpska, Bosnia and Herzegovina. As of 2013 Dvorovi had a population of 4,873 inhabitants. It suffered major damage during the flooding in May 2014.

== Tourism ==
Dvorovi Spa (Banja Dvorovi) is a popular tourist destination. It was established after the discovery of thermal water, while drilling for oil in 1956. The depth of the source is at 1350 meters, the water is oligomineral, and the water temperature is 75°C.

== Sport ==
Dvorovi has a football club known as FK Proleter Dvorovi.
