= Prnjavor =

Prnjavor, a common South Slavic placename, meaning "village on a monastery's property", may refer to:

== Bosnia and Herzegovina ==
- Prnjavor, Bosnia and Herzegovina, a town and municipality in northern Bosnia and Herzegovina
- Prnjavor, Bihać, village near Bihać
- Prnjavor (Kalesija), village near Kalesija
- Prnjavor, Vitez, a village near Vitez
- Prnjavor Veliki, village near Doboj
- Prnjavor Mali (Doboj), village near Doboj
- Prnjavor Mali (Banja Luka), village near Banjaluka

== Croatia ==
- Laze Prnjavor, near Požega
- Prnjavor, Kapela, near Kapela
- Prnjavor, Brod-Posavina County, a village near Oprisavci

== Montenegro ==
- Prnjavor, Plav, village near Plav

== Serbia ==
- Prnjavor (Batočina), a village near Batočina
- Prnjavor (Trstenik), a village near Trstenik
- Prnjavor (Gornji Milanovac), a village near Gornji Milanovac
- Prnjavor (Belgrade), a suburban settlement of Belgrade
- Bešenovački Prnjavor, near Irig
- Ivkovački Prnjavor, near Jagodina
- Jošanički Prnjavor, near Jagodina
- Krušedol Prnjavor, near Irig
- Kalenićki Prnjavor, near Rekovac
- Mačvanski Prnjavor, a village near Šabac
