= 2022–23 NK Istra 1961 season =

NK Istra 1961
2022–23 season
- Owner: Baskonia - Alavés Group
- Manager: Gonzalo García
- Stadium: Stadion Aldo Drosina
- HNL: 5th
- Croatian Cup: Second Round
- Top goalscorer: League: Ante Erceg (11); All: Ante Erceg (12)
- Highest home attendance: 4,785 v Hajduk Split (29 January 2023)
- Lowest home attendance: 557 v Slaven Belupo (20 January 2023)
- Average home league attendance: 1,910

The 2022–23 NK Istra 1961 season was the club's 62nd season in existence and the 14th consecutive season in the top flight of Croatian football.

== First-team squad ==
As of 3 March 2023

Note: Flags indicate national team as defined under FIFA eligibility rules; some limited exceptions apply. Players may hold more than one non-FIFA nationality.

No.	Pos.	Nation	Player
1	GK	CRO	Marijan Ćorić
2	DF	CRO	Luka Hujber
4	MF	CRO	Frano Mlinar
5	MF	ARG	Facundo Cáseres (on loan from Vélez Sarsfield)
6	MF	CRO	Tomislav Duvnjak
7	MF	CRO	Slavko Blagojević
8	MF	ESP	Einar Galilea (captain)
9	MF	CRO	Matej Vuk
10	MF	NED	Reda Boultam (on loan from Salernitana)
11	FW	ALG	Monsef Bakrar
14	DF	CRO	Luka Marin
15	FW	VEN	Darwin Matheus
16	MF	UKR	Oleksandr Petrusenko
18	FW	SUI	Zoran Josipovic

No.	Pos.	Nation	Player
20	DF	MDA	Iurie Iovu
21	GK	CRO	Lovro Majkić (vice-captain)
23	DF	AUT	Dario Marešić (on loan from Reims)
27	MF	MTN	Abdallahi Mahmoud (on loan from Deportivo Alavés)
32	DF	CRO	Mihael Rovis
33	DF	CRO	Luka Bradarić
34	FW	CRO	Mateo Lisica
35	MF	CRO	Antonio Maurić
37	MF	CRO	Lorenzo Travaglia
41	MF	CRO	Marko Cukon
45	DF	CRO	Ante Majstorović
50	FW	CRO	Ante Erceg
90	MF	ESP	Unai Naveira (on loan from Athletic Bilbao B)
97	DF	BIH	Advan Kadušić

== Transfers ==
=== In ===
Pos	Player	Transferred from	Fee	Date	Source
MF	(Croatia) Kristijan Kopljar	(Croatia) Vrapče	Free	6 June 2022	
DF	(Croatia) Luka Bradarić	(Croatia) Hajduk Split	Free	17 June 2022	
MF	(Croatia) Tino Blaž Lauš	(Croatia) Hajduk Split	Loan	25 June 2022	
FW	(Croatia) Bartol Barišić	(Croatia) Dinamo Zagreb II	Loan	29 June 2022	
MF	(Croatia) Tomislav Duvnjak	(Croatia) Dinamo Zagreb II	Free	29 June 2022	
GK	(Croatia) Jan Paus-Kunšt	(Croatia) Cres	Back from loan	1 July 2022	
DF	(Nigeria) Erhun Obanor	(Cyprus) PAEEK	Back from loan	1 July 2022	
MF	(Croatia) Donato Bernobić	(Croatia) BSK Bijelo Brdo	Back from loan	1 July 2022	
FW	(Croatia) Josip Hmura	(Croatia) Jadran Poreč	Back from loan	1 July 2022	
DF	(North Macedonia) Filip Antovski	Austria Wien	Loan	6 July 2022	
FW	(Croatia) Vinko Petković	(Croatia) Osijek	Loan	6 July 2022	
MF	(Croatia) Lovre Knežević	(Bulgaria) Etar Veliko Tarnovo	Free	8 July 2022	
DF	(Austria) Dario Marešić	(France) Reims	Loan	12 July 2022	
DF	(Bosnia and Herzegovina) Advan Kadušić	No team	Free	20 July 2022	
FW	(Algeria) Monsef Bakrar	(Algeria) ES Sétif	Free	20 July 2022	
MF	(Argentina) Facundo Cáseres	(Argentina) Vélez Sarsfield	Loan	26 July 2022	
MF	(Zambia) Prince Mumba	(Zambia) Kabwe Warriors	Loan	28 July 2022	
FW	(Croatia) Ante Erceg	(Hungary) Debrecen	Free	1 August 2022	
MF	(Ukraine) Oleksandr Petrusenko	(Hungary) Honvéd	Free	4 August 2022	
DF	(Moldova) Iurie Iovu	(Italy) Venezia	Loan	31 August 2022	
MF	(Netherlands) Reda Boultam	(Italy) Salernitana	Loan	31 August 2022	
MF	(Croatia) Matej Vuk	(Croatia) Rijeka	Free	6 December 2022	
FW	(Venezuela) Darwin Matheus	(United States) Atlanta United 2	Free	9 December 2022	
FW	(Russia) Serder Serderov	(Kazakhstan) Aktobe	Back from loan	31 December 2022	
MF	(Mauritania) Abdallahi Mahmoud	(Spain) Deportivo Alavés	Loan	4 January 2023	
GK	(Croatia) Marijan Ćorić	No team	Free	5 January 2023	
FW	(Switzerland) Zoran Josipovic	(Belarus) Dinamo Minsk	Free	16 January 2023	
MF	(Spain) Unai Naveira	(Spain) Athletic Bilbao B	Loan	31 January 2023	
DF	(Moldova) Iurie Iovu	(Italy) Venezia	Undisclosed	1 February 2023	
DF	(Croatia) Ante Majstorović	No team	Free	22 February 2023	

Source: Glasilo Hrvatskog nogometnog saveza

=== Out ===
Pos	Player	Transferred to	Fee	Date	Source
FW	(Croatia) Dion Drena Beljo	(Croatia) Osijek	Back from loan	26 May 2022	
MF	(Croatia) Antonio Ivančić	No team	Free	29 May 2022	
MF	(Mauritania) Abdallahi Mahmoud	(Spain) Deportivo Alavés	Back from loan	31 May 2022	
MF	(Spain) Antonio Perera	(Spain) Deportivo Alavés	Back from loan	31 May 2022	
DF	(Portugal) João Silva	(Spain) Deportivo Alavés	Back from loan	1 June 2022	
MF	(Argentina) Gonzalo Desio	No team	Free	1 June 2022	
MF	(Argentina) Facundo Cáseres	(Argentina) Vélez Sarsfield	Back from loan	4 June 2022	
FW	(Burkina Faso) Hassane Bandé	(Netherlands) Ajax	Back from loan	5 June 2022	
MF	(Croatia) Donato Bernobić	(Croatia) Jadran Poreč	Free	12 July 2022	
MF	(Croatia) Antonio Siljan	(Croatia) Jadran Poreč	Loan	13 July 2022	
FW	(Brazil) Lucas Moura	No team	Free	14 July 2022	
DF	(Croatia) Bernardo Matić	(Croatia) Šibenik	Free	15 July 2022	
DF	(Ghana) Gideon Acquah	(Spain) Montijo	Back from loan	21 July 2022	
MF	(Croatia) Dino Kapitanović	(Slovenia) Krka	Free	22 July 2022	
DF	(Croatia) Fran Vujnović	(Croatia) Kustošija	Loan	3 August 2022	
FW	(Bosnia and Herzegovina) Branko Đukić	(Croatia) Dugopolje	Free	4 August 2022	
FW	(Croatia) Josip Hmura	(United States) Sporting Kansas City II	Free	4 August 2022	
FW	(Croatia) Robert Mišković	(Czech Republic) Baník Ostrava	250,000 €	8 August 2022	
DF	(Spain) Rafa Navarro	(Spain) San Sebastián de los Reyes	Free	10 August 2022	
FW	(Croatia) Bartol Barišić	(Croatia) Dinamo Zagreb II	Recalled from loan	31 August 2022	
GK	(Austria) Ivan Lučić	(Croatia) Hajduk Split	Free	26 November 2022	
GK	(Chile) Gonzalo Collao	(Chile) Palestino	Free	30 November 2022	
FW	(Croatia) Vinko Petković	(Croatia) Osijek	Recalled from loan	13 December 2022	
DF	(Nigeria) Erhun Obanor	(Greece) Proodeftiki	Free	17 January 2023	
DF	(North Macedonia) Filip Antovski	Austria Wien	Recalled from loan	19 January 2023	
MF	(Croatia) Tino Blaž Lauš	(Croatia) Hajduk Split	Recalled from loan	23 January 2023	
DF	(Moldova) Iurie Iovu	(Italy) Venezia	Back from loan	31 August 2022	
MF	(Zambia) Prince Mumba	(Zambia) Kabwe Warriors	Recalled from loan	31 January 2023	
FW	(Russia) Serder Serderov	No team	Free	31 January 2023	
GK	(Croatia) Jan Paus-Kunšt	(Croatia) Jadran Poreč	Dual registration	15 February 2023	
MF	(Croatia) Lovre Knežević	(Croatia) Jadran Poreč	Dual registration	15 February 2023	
MF	(Croatia) Kristijan Kopljar	(Croatia) Jadran Poreč	Dual registration	15 February 2023	
MF	(Croatia) Marin Žgomba	(Croatia) Jadran Poreč	Dual registration	15 February 2023	
DF	(Croatia) Mauro Perković	(Croatia) Dinamo Zagreb	Loan	16 February 2023	

Source: Glasilo Hrvatskog nogometnog saveza

Total spending: ▼0 €

Total income: ▲250,000 €

Total expenditure: ▲250,000 €

== Competitions ==
=== Overview ===
Competition	First match	Last match	Starting round	Final position	Record							
Competition	First match	Last match	Starting round	Final position	Pld	W	D	L	GF	GA	GD	Win %
SuperSport HNL	17 July 2022	27 May 2023	Matchday 1	5th	36	11	13	12	36	38	−2	30.56
Croatian Cup	19 October 2022	8 November 2022	First Round	Second Round	2	1	0	1	3	3	+0	50.00
Total					38	12	13	13	39	41	−2	31.58

Last updated: 28 May 2023
Source: Soccerway

=== SuperSport HNL ===
==== League table ====
Pos	Team	Pld	W	D	L	GF	GA	GD	Pts	Qualification or relegation
3	Osijek	36	13	11	12	46	41	+5	50	Qualification to Europa Conference League second qualifying round
4	Rijeka	36	14	7	15	44	44	0	49	Qualification to Europa Conference League second qualifying round
5	Istra 1961	36	11	13	12	36	38	−2	46	
6	Varaždin	36	12	10	14	41	51	−10	46	
7	Lokomotiva	36	11	10	15	45	50	−5	43	

Source: SuperSport HNL
Rules for classification: 1) Points; 2) Head-to-head points; 3) Head-to-head goal difference; 4) Head-to-head goals scored (at home if two teams tied); 5) Goal difference; 6) Goals scored; 7) Play-off
(Note: Criteria 2-4 and 7 is only used if deciding champion, teams to international competition or teams for relegation and in that case criteria 6 will not be used).

==== Results summary ====
Overall								Home						Away					
Pld	W	D	L	GF	GA	GD	Pts	W	D	L	GF	GA	GD	W	D	L	GF	GA	GD
36	11	13	12	36	38	−2	46	8	6	4	17	11	+6	3	7	8	19	27	−8

Last updated: 28 May 2023.
Source: SuperSport HNL

==== Results by round ====
Round	1	2	3	4	5	6	7	8	9	10	11	12	13	14	15	16	17	18	19	20	21	22	23	24	25	26	27	28	29	30	31	32	33	34	35	36
Ground	H	H	A	H	A	H	A	H	A	A	A	H	A	H	A	H	A	H	H	H	A	H	A	H	A	H	A	A	A	H	A	H	A	H	A	H
Result	L	L	L	W	D	D	W	L	W	D	D	W	L	D	W	W	L	D	W	W	L	W	D	L	L	D	L	D	D	D	L	W	D	W	L	D
Position	10	10	10	9	10	10	6	8	6	6	6	5	5	6	6	5	6	6	4	4	4	4	4	4	4	5	7	7	6	7	7	5	5	5	5	5

Updated to match(es) played on 28 May 2023. Source: SuperSport HNL
A = Away; H = Home; W = Win; D = Draw; L = Loss

==== Matches ====
17 July 2022 1	Istra 1961	0–2	Hajduk Split	Pula
21:00 CEST (UTC+02:00)	Hujber (yellow card) 15'; Maurić (yellow card) 18'; Mlinar (yellow card) 58'; Antovski (yellow card) 90+2'; Majkić (yellow card) 90+3'	Report	Melnjak 43'; Mlakar (yellow card) 55'; Livaja 61'	Stadium: Stadion Aldo Drosina; Attendance: 4,246; Referee: Tihomir Pejin

22 July 2022 2	Istra 1961	1–2	Varaždin	Pula
19:00 CEST (UTC+02:00)	Galilea (yellow card) 21'; Hujber (yellow card) 65'; Marin 70'; Maurić (yellow card) 79'	Report	Pëllumbi (yellow card) 63'; Herrera (yellow card) 65'; Brodić 77'; Postonjski 83' (pen.); Belcar (yellow card) 90+2'	Stadium: Stadion Aldo Drosina; Attendance: 1,278; Referee: Duje Strukan

29 July 2022 3	Dinamo Zagreb	4–1	Istra 1961	Zagreb
21:00 CEST (UTC+02:00)	Oršić 11' (pen.); B. Šutalo 32'; Moharrami (yellow card) 45+1'; Bočkaj 81'; Emreli 88'	Report	Bakrar 84'	Stadium: Stadion Maksimir; Attendance: 3,393; Referee: Igor Pajač

6 August 2022 4	Istra 1961	1–0	Osijek	Pula
21:00 CEST (UTC+02:00)	Marin (yellow card) 52'; Mumba (yellow card) 67'; Bakrar 90+4'; Majkić (yellow card) 90+6'	Report	Jugović (yellow card) 6'; Jurčević (yellow card) 33'; Škorić (yellow card) 90+6'; Fiolić (yellow card) 90+6'	Stadium: Stadion Aldo Drosina; Attendance: 1,230; Referee: Patrik Kolarić

12 August 2022 5	Šibenik	0–0	Istra 1961	Šibenik
20:00 CEST (UTC+02:00)		Report	Marin (yellow card) 84'	Stadium: Stadion Šubićevac; Attendance: 1,296; Referee: Ante Čuljak

21 August 2022 6	Istra 1961	1–1	Rijeka	Pula
18:55 CEST (UTC+02:00)	Galilea (yellow card) 8'; Petković 26'; Kadušić (yellow card) 40'; Marin (yellow card) 71'; Mlinar (yellow card) 75'	Report	Vučkić 5'; Vrančić (yellow card) 47'; Pavlović (yellow card) 81'; Selahi (yellow card) 84'	Stadium: Stadion Aldo Drosina; Attendance: 2,422; Referee: Zdenko Lovrić

26 August 2022 7	Gorica	0–2	Istra 1961	Velika Gorica
20:00 CEST (UTC+02:00)	Da Cruz (yellow card) 45'; Suk (yellow card) 49'; Wagué (yellow card) 90+3'	Report	Erceg 81', 90+4'	Stadium: Stadion Radnik; Attendance: 1,356; Referee: Ivan Bebek

4 September 2022 8	Istra 1961	1–2	Lokomotiva	Pula
18:55 CEST (UTC+02:00)	Perković (yellow card) 56'; Erceg 81'; Galilea (yellow card) 82'	Report	Pivarić 24'; Cipetić (yellow card) 33'; Çokaj (yellow card) 64'; Goričan 66'; Marić (yellow card) 70'	Stadium: Stadion Aldo Drosina; Attendance: 1,419; Referee: Dario Bel

11 September 2022 9	Slaven Belupo	0–3	Istra 1961	Koprivnica
18:55 CEST (UTC+02:00)	Tepšić (yellow card) 20'; Žuljević (yellow card) 28'	Report	Petković 10'; Erceg 29' (yellow card) 83'; Cáseres (yellow card) 45+2'; Boultam 67'; Rovis (yellow card) 73'	Stadium: Gradski stadion Attendance: 875; Referee: Goran Pečarić

17 September 2022 10	Hajduk Split	2–2	Istra 1961	Split
19:05 CEST (UTC+02:00)	Lovrencsics (yellow card) 25'; Livaja 47', 88'; Kalik (yellow card) 82'; Sahiti (yellow card) 90+3'	Report	Erceg 52'; Boultam 64'; Kadušić (yellow card) 71'; Majkić (yellow card) 90+1'	Stadium: Stadion Poljud; Attendance: 12,976; Referee: Patrik Kolarić

30 September 2022 11	Varaždin	1–1	Istra 1961	Varaždin
18:00 CEST (UTC+02:00)	Stolnik (yellow card) 28'; Teklić 37' (yellow card) 77'; Herrera (yellow card) 50'	Report	Cáseres (yellow card) 22' (goal) 69'; Erceg (yellow card) 47'; Kadušić (yellow card) 51'; Galilea (yellow card) 86'; Mumba (yellow card) 90+1'; Hujber (yellow card) 90+2'	Stadium: Stadion Varteks; Attendance: 1,593; Referee: Dario Bel

15 October 2022 13	Osijek	2–0	Istra 1961	Osijek
16:55 CEST (UTC+02:00)	Barišić (yellow card) 8'; Žaper (yellow card) 28'; Miérez 62'; Caktaš 90+5'	Report	Rovis (yellow card) 5'; Perković (yellow card) 51'; Erceg (yellow card) 57'; Petrusenko (yellow card) 60'; Antovski (red card) 90+3'	Stadium: Gradski Vrt Stadium; Attendance: 3,524; Referee: Goran Pečarić

23 October 2022 14	Istra 1961	0–0	Šibenik	Pula
15:00 CEST (UTC+02:00)	Galilea (yellow card) 83'; Petković (yellow card) 89'; Kopljar (yellow card) 90+1'	Report	Mina (yellow card) 34'	Stadium: Stadion Aldo Drosina; Attendance: 819; Referee: Ante Čuljak

29 October 2022 15	Rijeka	0–1	Istra 1961	Rijeka
15:00 CEST (UTC+02:00)	Ampem (yellow card) 3'; Selahi (yellow card) 32'; D. Pavlović (yellow card) 37'; Hodža (yellow card) 78'	Report	Perković (yellow card) 4'; Hujber (yellow card) 16'; Marešić (yellow card) 61'; Erceg 63' (yellow card) 82'; Boultam (yellow card) 90+4'	Stadium: Stadion Rujevica; Attendance: 3,755; Referee: Dario Bel

4 November 2022 16	Istra 1961	1–0	Gorica	Pula
18:00 CET (UTC+01:00)	Mlinar (yellow card) 34'; Cáseres (yellow card) 48'; Galilea (yellow card) 68'; Hujber (yellow card) 74'; Bakrar 90'	Report	Steenvoorden (yellow card) 45+4'; Francois (yellow card) 57'; Keita (yellow card) 87'	Stadium: Stadion Aldo Drosina; Attendance: 890; Referee: Ante Čulina

12 November 2022 17	Lokomotiva	2–0	Istra 1961	Zagreb
15:00 CET (UTC+01:00)	Tuci (yellow card) 2'; Kulenović 11' (pen.); Stojković 73'	Report		Stadium: Stadion Kranjčevićeva; Attendance: 681; Referee: Dario Kulušić

20 January 2023 18	Istra 1961	0–0	Slaven Belupo	Pula
17:00 CET (UTC+01:00)		Report	Jambor (yellow card) 66'; Božić (yellow card) 69'; Christopoulos (yellow card) 85'; Marina (yellow card) 90'	Stadium: Stadion Aldo Drosina; Attendance: 557; Referee: Ante Čulina

29 January 2023 19	Istra 1961	3–0	Hajduk Split	Pula
17:10 CET (UTC+01:00)	Erceg 29', 65'; Galilea 53'	Report	Prpić (yellow card) 14'; Simić (yellow card) 73'	Stadium: Stadion Aldo Drosina; Attendance: 4,785; Referee: Igor Pajač

3 February 2023 20	Istra 1961	2–1	Varaždin	Pula
17:00 CET (UTC+01:00)	Cáseres (yellow card) 23'; Galilea 42'; Erceg (yellow card) 63'; Mahmoud (yellow card) 72'; Marešić 90'	Report	Teklić (yellow card) 25'; Brodić 57'	Stadium: Stadion Aldo Drosina; Attendance: 952; Referee: Fran Jović

10 February 2023 21	Dinamo Zagreb	1–0	Istra 1961	Zagreb
17:00 CET (UTC+01:00)	Ristovski 37'	Report	Hujber (yellow card) 29'; Mahmoud (yellow card) 53'	Stadium: Stadion Maksimir; Attendance: 2,412; Referee: Ivan Bebek

18 February 2023 22	Istra 1961	1–0	Osijek	Pula
15:00 CET (UTC+01:00)	Erceg 57' (yellow card) 61'	Report	Žaper (yellow card) 17'; Leovac (yellow card) 73'; Miérez (red card) 79'; Škorić (yellow card) 83'; Živković (yellow card) 90+10'	Stadium: Stadion Aldo Drosina; Attendance: 1,358; Referee: Ante Čuljak

24 February 2023 23	Šibenik	0–0	Istra 1961	Šibenik
17:00 CET (UTC+01:00)	Hiroš (yellow card) 58'; Mesa (yellow card) 90+2'	Report	Petrusenko (yellow card) 78'; Mlinar (yellow card) 79'	Stadium: Stadion Šubićevac; Attendance: 511; Referee: Kyriakos Athanasiou

3 March 2023 24	Istra 1961	0–2	Rijeka	Pula
17:00 CET (UTC+01:00)	Erceg (yellow card) 43' (yellow-red card) 90'; Petrusenko (yellow card) 57'; Mlinar (red card) 70'; Galilea (yellow card) 89'	Report	Janković 22', 90+5' (pen.); Banda (yellow card) 45'; Frigan (yellow card) 90'	Stadium: Stadion Aldo Drosina; Attendance: 3,019; Referee: Jakov Titlić

10 March 2023 25	Gorica	5–4	Istra 1961	Velika Gorica
17:00 CET (UTC+01:00)	Štiglec (yellow card) 28'; Bralić 30' (yellow card) 60'; A. M. Jurić (yellow card) 62'; Krizmanić (yellow card) 70'; Pršir 79' (pen.); Banić (yellow card) 80'; Fućak 81'; Suk 83'; Mrzljak (yellow card) 85'; Mitrović 90+6'	Report	Bakrar 13', 42'; Hujber (yellow card) 45+2'; Cáseres 55'; Marešić (yellow card) 71'; Boultam (yellow card) 74'; Majkić (yellow card) 78'; Matheus 90+5'	Stadium: Stadion Radnik; Attendance: 937; Referee: Zdenko Lovrić

15 March 2023 12	Istra 1961	1–0	Dinamo Zagreb	Pula
17:00 CET (UTC+01:00)	Matheus 90+2'; Marin (yellow card) 90+3'	Report	Menalo (yellow card) 53'; Perić (yellow card) 70'; Livaković (yellow card) 84'	Stadium: Stadion Aldo Drosina; Attendance: 2,819; Referee: Mateo Erceg

19 March 2023 26	Istra 1961	0–0	Lokomotiva	Pula
15:00 CET (UTC+01:00)	Marešić (yellow card) 90+1'; Mahmoud (yellow card) 90+3'	Report	Cipetić (yellow card) 18'; Bubanja (yellow card) 69'; Aliyu (yellow card) 72'	Stadium: Stadion Aldo Drosina; Attendance: 1,419; Referee: Igor Pajač

31 March 2023 27	Slaven Belupo	2–0	Istra 1961	Koprivnica
18:00 CEST (UTC+02:00)	Mudražija 39' (yellow card) 41'; Krstanović 73'; Mioč (yellow card) 89'	Report	Mlinar (yellow card) 28'; Petrusenko (yellow card) 51'; Hujber (yellow card) 56'; Galilea (yellow card) 78'; Bradarić (yellow card) 90+5'; Boultam (yellow card) 90+5'	Stadium: Gradski stadion Attendance: 593; Referee: Fran Jović

7 April 2023 28	Hajduk Split	2–2	Istra 1961	Split
18:10 CEST (UTC+02:00)	Mlakar 2', 45+1'; Grgić (yellow card) 36'; Ferro (yellow card) 36'; Livaja (yellow card) 36'; Borevković (red card) 46'; Krovinović (yellow card) 90+7'	Report	Hujber 20'; Bakrar 21'; Marešić (yellow card) 39' (yellow-red card) 79'; Majkić (yellow card) 88'	Stadium: Stadion Poljud; Attendance: 14,966; Referee: Ante Čulina

16 April 2023 29	Varaždin	0–0	Istra 1961	Varaždin
15:00 CEST (UTC+02:00)	Drožđek (yellow card) 51'; Jelenić (yellow card) 90+2'	Report	Iovu (yellow card) 45' (yellow-red card) 76'	Stadium: Stadion Varteks; Attendance: 1,494; Referee: Ivan Bebek

22 April 2023 30	Istra 1961	0–0	Dinamo Zagreb	Pula
17:00 CEST (UTC+02:00)	Galilea (yellow card) 57'; Mahmoud (yellow card) 90+3'	Report	Perković (yellow card) 22'; Ristovski (yellow card) 90+5'	Stadium: Stadion Aldo Drosina; Attendance: 3,340; Referee: Duje Strukan

26 April 2023 31	Osijek	1–0	Istra 1961	Osijek
15:00 CEST (UTC+02:00)	Leovac (yellow card) 36'; Fiolić (yellow card) 65'; Miérez 72'; Bukvić (yellow card) 73'	Report		Stadium: Gradski Vrt Stadium; Attendance: 1,322; Referee: Igor Pajač

29 April 2023 32	Istra 1961	3–0	Šibenik	Pula
18:00 CEST (UTC+02:00)	Mlinar 44' (pen.); Bakrar 71'; Mahmoud 85'; L. Knežević (yellow card) 90+1'	Report	Đorić (yellow card) 43'	Stadium: Stadion Aldo Drosina; Attendance: 1,311; Referee: Duje Strukan

6 May 2023 33	Rijeka	2–2	Istra 1961	Rijeka
19:10 CEST (UTC+02:00)	Frigan 73' (pen.); Labrović (yellow card) 76'; Ampem 90+7'	Report	Galilea (yellow card) 17' (yellow-red card) 38'; L. Marin (yellow card) 20'; Kadušić 31'; Bakrar 50'; Erceg (yellow card) 83'; Ćorić (yellow card) 86'	Stadium: Stadion Rujevica; Attendance: 6,657; Referee: Igor Pajač

13 May 2023 34	Istra 1961	1–0	Gorica	Pula
19:10 CEST (UTC+02:00)	Erceg 33' (pen.); Kadušić (yellow card) 65'	Report	Tomečak (yellow card) 32'; Steenvoorden (yellow card) 90+6'	Stadium: Stadion Aldo Drosina; Attendance: 1,234; Referee: Ivan Bebek

21 May 2023 35	Lokomotiva	3–1	Istra 1961	Zagreb
17:00 CEST (UTC+02:00)	Goričan 9'; Kulenović 32' (yellow card) 75'; Krivak (yellow card) 44'; Marić (yellow card) 48'; Kalaica (yellow card) 79'; Kačavenda (yellow card) 90'; Stojković 90+2'	Report	Erceg 80' (pen.)	Stadium: Stadion Kranjčevićeva; Attendance: 902; Referee: Mateo Erceg

27 May 2023 36	Istra 1961	1–1	Slaven Belupo	Pula
16:30 CEST (UTC+02:00)	Galilea (yellow card) 10'; Marešić (yellow card) 57' (yellow-red card) 90'; Mlinar 85'; Blagojević (yellow card) 60'	Report	Bašić (yellow card) 2'; Hoxha 55'; Mudražija (yellow card) 57'; Mioč (yellow card) 67'	Stadium: Stadion Aldo Drosina; Attendance: 1,288; Referee: Ante Čulina

=== Croatian Football Cup ===
19 October 2022 R1	Grobničan	1–2	Istra 1961	Čavle
15:00 CEST (UTC+02:00)	Galešić 22'	Report	Erceg 20'; Kadušić (yellow card) 78' (goal) 85'	Stadium: Mavrinci; Attendance: 400; Referee: Ante Čulina

8 November 2022 R2	Rudeš	2–1	Istra 1961	Zagreb
14:00 CET (UTC+01:00)	Gudelj 11'; Latković 20' (yellow card) 40' (yellow-red card) 90+4'; Srbljinović (yellow card) 43'; Kovačević (yellow card) 83'; Pavlek (yellow card) 89'; Laća (yellow card) 90+1'; Kralj (yellow card) 90+1'	Report	Galilea (yellow card) 45'; Mlinar 77'; Cáseres (yellow card) 90+3'	Stadium: ŠC Rudeš; Attendance: 250; Referee: Dario Kulušić

== Player seasonal records ==
Updated 28 May 2023

=== Goals ===
Rank	Name	League	Cup	Total
1	(Croatia) Ante Erceg	11	1	12
2	(Algeria) Monsef Bakrar	8	–	8
3	(Croatia) Frano Mlinar	2	1	3
4	(Netherlands) Reda Boultam	2	–	2
4	(Argentina) Facundo Cáseres	2	–	2
4	(Spain) Einar Galilea	2	–	2
4	(Venezuela) Darwin Matheus	2	–	2
4	(Croatia) Vinko Petković	2	–	2
4	(Bosnia and Herzegovina) Advan Kadušić	1	1	2
10	(Croatia) Luka Hujber	1	–	1
10	(Mauritania) Abdallahi Mahmoud	1	–	1
10	(Austria) Dario Marešić	1	–	1
10	(Croatia) Luka Marin	1	–	1
TOTALS		36	3	39

Source: Competitive matches

=== Clean sheets ===
Rank	Name	League	Cup	Total
1	(Croatia) Lovro Majkić	17	–	17
TOTALS		17	0	17

Source: Competitive matches

=== Disciplinary record ===
Number	Position	Player	HNL			Croatian Cup			Total		
Number	Position	Player	Yellow card	(yellow card) (yellow-red card)	Red card	Yellow card	(yellow card) (yellow-red card)	Red card	Yellow card	(yellow card) (yellow-red card)	Red card
1	GK	(Croatia) Marijan Ćorić	1	0	0	0	0	0	1	0	0
2	DF	(Croatia) Luka Hujber	8	0	0	0	0	0	8	0	0
3	DF	(North Macedonia) Filip Antovski	1	0	1	0	0	0	1	0	1
4	MF	(Croatia) Frano Mlinar	5	0	1	0	0	0	5	0	1
5	MF	(Argentina) Facundo Cáseres	4	0	0	1	0	0	5	0	0
7	MF	(Croatia) Slavko Blagojević	1	0	0	0	0	0	1	0	0
8	MF	(Spain) Einar Galilea	10	1	0	1	0	0	11	1	0
10	MF	(Netherlands) Reda Boultam	3	0	0	0	0	0	3	0	0
13	MF	(Zambia) Prince Mumba	2	0	0	0	0	0	2	0	0
14	DF	(Croatia) Luka Marin	5	0	0	0	0	0	5	0	0
16	MF	(Ukraine) Oleksandr Petrusenko	4	0	0	0	0	0	4	0	0
17	MF	(Croatia) Kristijan Kopljar	1	0	0	0	0	0	1	0	0
20	DF	(Moldova) Iurie Iovu	0	1	0	0	0	0	0	1	0
21	GK	(Croatia) Lovro Majkić	5	0	0	0	0	0	5	0	0
22	MF	(Croatia) Lovre Knežević	1	0	0	0	0	0	1	0	0
23	DF	(Austria) Dario Marešić	3	2	0	0	0	0	3	2	0
27	MF	(Mauritania) Abdallahi Mahmoud	4	0	0	0	0	0	4	0	0
32	DF	(Croatia) Mihael Rovis	2	0	0	0	0	0	2	0	0
33	DF	(Croatia) Luka Bradarić	1	0	0	0	0	0	1	0	0
35	MF	(Croatia) Antonio Maurić	2	0	0	0	0	0	2	0	0
39	DF	(Croatia) Mauro Perković	3	0	0	0	0	0	3	0	0
50	FW	(Croatia) Ante Erceg	7	1	0	0	0	0	7	1	0
95	FW	(Croatia) Vinko Petković	1	0	0	0	0	0	1	0	0
97	DF	(Bosnia and Herzegovina) Advan Kadušić	4	0	0	1	0	0	5	0	0
TOTALS			78	5	2	3	0	0	81	5	2

=== Appearances and goals ===
Number	Position	Player	Apps	Goals	Apps	Goals	Apps	Goals
Number	Position	Player	Total		HNL (Note: First number represents appearances in starting eleven, while the second number indicates a substitute appearance.)		Croatian Cup	
1	GK	(Austria) Ivan Lučić	3	0	1+0	0	2+0	0
2	DF	(Croatia) Luka Hujber	35	1	32+1	1	1+1	0
3	DF	(North Macedonia) Filip Antovski	11	0	1+9	0	1+0	0
4	MF	(Croatia) Frano Mlinar	33	3	29+3	2	1+0	1
5	MF	(Argentina) Facundo Cáseres	35	2	32+1	2	2+0	0
6	MF	(Croatia) Tomislav Duvnjak	12	0	3+9	0	0+0	0
7	MF	(Croatia) Slavko Blagojević	4	0	0+4	0	0+0	0
8	MF	(Spain) Einar Galilea	33	2	30+1	2	2+0	0
9	FW	(Croatia) Bartol Barišić	3	0	3+0	0	0+0	0
9	MF	(Croatia) Matej Vuk	15	0	10+5	0	0+0	0
10	MF	(Netherlands) Reda Boultam	23	2	14+8	2	0+1	0
10	FW	(Croatia) Robert Mišković	2	0	2+0	0	0+0	0
11	FW	(Algeria) Monsef Bakrar	33	8	18+13	8	2+0	0
12	DF	(Spain) Rafa Navarro	1	0	0+1	0	0+0	0
13	MF	(Zambia) Prince Mumba	10	0	1+8	0	1+0	0
14	DF	(Croatia) Luka Marin	30	1	23+6	1	1+0	0
15	FW	(Venezuela) Darwin Matheus	8	2	3+5	2	0+0	0
16	MF	(Ukraine) Oleksandr Petrusenko	33	0	30+1	0	1+1	0
17	MF	(Croatia) Kristijan Kopljar	7	0	0+6	0	0+1	0
18	FW	(Switzerland) Zoran Josipovic	5	0	1+4	0	0+0	0
18	MF	(Croatia) Tino Blaž Lauš	6	0	0+4	0	1+1	0
20	DF	(Moldova) Iurie Iovu	3	0	3+0	0	0+0	0
21	GK	(Croatia) Lovro Majkić	35	0	35+0	0	0+0	0
22	MF	(Croatia) Lovre Knežević	2	0	0+2	0	0+0	0
23	DF	(Austria) Dario Marešić	29	1	25+2	1	2+0	0
27	MF	(Mauritania) Abdallahi Mahmoud	18	1	5+13	1	0+0	0
30	MF	(Croatia) Marin Žgomba	6	0	1+4	0	0+1	0
31	DF	(Croatia) Fran Vujnović	1	0	0+1	0	0+0	0
32	DF	(Croatia) Mihael Rovis	9	0	5+4	0	0+0	0
33	DF	(Croatia) Luka Bradarić	6	0	3+3	0	0+0	0
34	MF	(Croatia) Mateo Lisica	17	0	5+12	0	0+0	0
35	DF	(Croatia) Antonio Maurić	5	0	3+1	0	1+0	0
37	FW	(Croatia) Lorenzo Travaglia	3	0	0+2	0	0+1	0
39	DF	(Croatia) Mauro Perković	18	0	17+0	0	1+0	0
41	MF	(Croatia) Marko Cukon	1	0	0+1	0	0+0	0
45	DF	(Croatia) Ante Majstorović	3	0	2+1	0	0+0	0
50	FW	(Croatia) Ante Erceg	21	12	16+4	11	1+0	1
95	FW	(Croatia) Vinko Petković	14	2	10+3	2	1+0	0
97	DF	(Bosnia and Herzegovina) Advan Kadušić	34	2	32+0	1	1+1	1
