= 2026–27 FK Sarajevo season =

Sarajevo
2026–27 season
- Owner: Ismir Mirvić
- Sporting director: Zoran Mamić
- Manager: Zoran Zekić
- Stadium: Asim Ferhatović Hase Stadium
- Bosnian Premier League: 3rd
- Bosnian Cup: Round of 32
- UEFA Conference League: First qualifying round
- Top goalscorer: League: Bartol Barišić (4); All: Bartol Barišić (6)
- Highest home attendance: 19,800 vs Željezničar (24 October 2026)
- Lowest home attendance: 400 vs BSK (21 August 2026)
- Average home league attendance: 5,654
- Biggest win: Sarajevo 2–0 Sloga Doboj (20 September 2026); Sarajevo 2–0 Željezničar (24 October 2026)
- Biggest defeat: Željezničar 2–0 Sarajevo (9 September 2026)
Home colours	Away colours

The 2026–27 Sarajevo season is the club's 78th season in history, and their 33rd consecutive season in the top flight of Bosnian football, the Bosnian Premier League. Besides competing in the Premier League, the team also competed in the National Cup and the qualifications for the UEFA Conference League.

== Squad information ==
=== First-team squad ===
As of 14 August 2026

Note: Flags indicate national team as defined under FIFA eligibility rules; some limited exceptions apply. Players may hold more than one non-FIFA nationality.

No.	Pos.	Nation	Player
2	DF	ZIM	Shane Maroodza
3	DF	BIH	Renato Gojković
5	MF	BIH	Rijad Telalović
6	DF	CAN	Jovan Ivanišević
7	FW	CRO	Ivan Šarić
8	MF	CRO	Antonio Galešić
9	FW	CRO	Leo Mikić
11	FW	GHA	Francis Kyeremeh
13	GK	BIH	Sanin Mušija
17	DF	SLO	Filip Kosi
18	DF	BIH	Matija Glogovac
19	FW	COL	Ricardo Caraballo
19	FW	SRB	Andreja Ristić
20	MF	MKD	Agon Elezi
22	DF	BIH	Amar Beganović (captain)
23	FW	DEN	Jonathan Agyekum
24	FW	CRO	Filip Živković (on loan from Osijek)

No.	Pos.	Nation	Player
25	FW	ESP	Junior Awusi
27	DF	CRO	Luka Hujber
28	GK	BIH	Haris Mujanić (on loan from Koper)
29	MF	BIH	Amar Cerić
30	DF	CRO	Luka Dajčer
31	GK	CRO	Ivan Banić
35	MF	UKR	Serhiy Ihnatkov
38	DF	CIV	Souleymane Méité
40	GK	BIH	Faris Mehić
44	DF	CRO	Petar Mišković
59	MF	BIH	Gojko Cimirot
66	MF	CYP	Rafail Mamas
70	DF	BIH	Selmir Pidro
77	DF	CRO	Mihael Kuprešak
99	FW	CRO	Bartol Barišić
—	FW	SEN	Albert Mendy

=== Youth academy players ===
FK Sarajevo Academy players that received a first-team squad call-up.

No.	Pos.	Nation	Player
16	MF	BIH	Muhamed Dreca
21	FW	BIH	Anes H. Mehmedović
26	DF	BIH	Daris Dizdarević

No.	Pos.	Nation	Player
32	MF	BIH	Vedad Leto
45	GK	BIH	Ibrahim Zahirović
55	MF	BIH	Kenan Vrban

=== Coaching staff ===
Position	Name
Head coach	(Croatia) Zoran Zekić
Assistant coaches	(Croatia) Želimir Mešnjak
Assistant coaches	(Croatia) Luka Šarlija
Goalkeeping coaches	(Bosnia and Herzegovina) Adi Adilović
Goalkeeping coaches	(Bosnia and Herzegovina) Domagoj Malovan
Fitness coaches	(Croatia) Marko Matijević
Fitness coaches	(Bosnia and Herzegovina) Evelin Pipo
Fitness coaches	(Bosnia and Herzegovina) Emir Muratović
Video analyst	(Bosnia and Herzegovina) Admir Kozlić
Doctors	(Bosnia and Herzegovina) Dr. Reuf Karabeg
Doctors	(Bosnia and Herzegovina) Dr. Arman Pindžo
Doctors	(Bosnia and Herzegovina) Dr. Benjamin Kaknjašević
Physiotherapists	(Bosnia and Herzegovina) Ismar Hadžibajrić
Physiotherapists	(Bosnia and Herzegovina) Mirza Marevac
Physiotherapists	(Bosnia and Herzegovina) Eldin Jarović
Physiotherapists	(Bosnia and Herzegovina) Enes Beganović
Technical staff manager	(Bosnia and Herzegovina) Mustafa Beridan
Equipment manager	(Bosnia and Herzegovina) Nermin Huskić
Equipment manager	(Bosnia and Herzegovina) Alen Ramović

== Transfers ==
=== In ===
Date	Pos.	Player	From	Fee	Ref.
1 June 2026 (Note: Completed on 15 January 2026 and became official on 1 June 2026)	DF	(Croatia) Petar Mišković	(Croatia) Solin	Undisclosed	
1 June 2026	DF	(Slovenia) Filip Kosi	(Slovenia) Aluminij	Free transfer	
12 June 2026	MF	(Croatia) Antonio Galešić	(Croatia) Orijent	Free transfer	
12 June 2026	FW	(Croatia) Leo Mikić	(Bosnia and Herzegovina) Zrinjski Mostar	Free transfer	
17 June 2026	FW	(Denmark) Jonathan Agyekum	(Denmark) Brøndby	Free transfer	
25 June 2026	FW	(Croatia) Bartol Barišić	(Slovakia) Dunajská Streda	Undisclosed	
25 June 2026	FW	(Colombia) Ricardo Caraballo	(Saudi Arabia) Al-Ittihad	Free transfer	
2 July 2026	DF	(Croatia) Luka Dajčer	(Croatia) Lokomotiva Zagreb	Undisclosed	
25 July 2026	DF	(Bosnia and Herzegovina) Selmir Pidro	(Bosnia and Herzegovina) Velež Mostar	Free transfer	
25 July 2026	FW	(Croatia) Ivan Šarić	(Bosnia and Herzegovina) Velež Mostar	Free transfer	
2 August 2026	DF	(Bosnia and Herzegovina) Matija Glogovac	(Bosnia and Herzegovina) Leotar	€200,000	
4 August 2026	DF	(Canada) Jovan Ivanišević	(Croatia) Istra 1961	€150,000	
27 August 2026	FW	(Spain) Junior Awusi	(Germany) Eintracht Frankfurt II	Free transer	
Total				€350,000	

=== Out ===
Date	Pos.	Player	To	Fee	Ref.
1 June 2026	FW	(Brazil) Renan Oliveira	(Lithuania) Kauno Žalgiris	End of contract	
2 June 2026	DF	(Bosnia and Herzegovina) Hamza Redžić	(Serbia) Vojvodina	Undisclosed	
14 June 2026	FW	(Brazil) João Carlos	(China) Guangdong GZ-Power	Contract termination	
19 June 2026	FW	(Bosnia and Herzegovina) Luka Menalo	(Indonesia) Persib Bandung	Undisclosed	
21 June 2026	DF	(Croatia) Slavko Bralić	Free agent	End of contract	
23 June 2026	FW	(Bosnia and Herzegovina) Aldin Turkeš	(Switzerland) Winterthur	Contract termination	
1 July 2026	MF	(Bosnia and Herzegovina) Anes Krdžalić	(Spain) Tenerife	End of contract	
1 July 2026	MF	(Bosnia and Herzegovina) Bakir Nurković	(Montenegro) Bokelj	End of contract	
4 July 2026	DF	(Bosnia and Herzegovina) Tarik Kapetanović	(Bosnia and Herzegovina) Sloboda Tuzla	Contract termination	
22 July 2026	DF	(Bosnia and Herzegovina) Nermin Mujkić	(United Arab Emirates) Al Jazira	€1,000,000 (Note: FK Sarajevo retained a percentage of the player's next transfer)	
29 July 2026	MF	(Bosnia and Herzegovina) Muamer Hamzić	(Bosnia and Herzegovina) Travnik	Contract termination	
12 August 2026	DF	(North Macedonia) Stefan Ristovski	Free agent	Contract termination	
14 August 2026	MF	(Serbia) Adem Ljajić	(Serbia) Novi Pazar	Contract termination	
Total				€1,000,000	

=== Loans in ===
Start date	End date	Pos.	Player	From	Ref.
5 February 2026	4 August 2026 (Note: Initially on loan until 31 December 2026, but FK Sarajevo exercised an option-to-buy clause and signed Ivanišević before the loan expired.)	DF	(Canada) Jovan Ivanišević	(Croatia) Istra 1961	
12 February 2026	31 December 2026	FW	(Croatia) Filip Živković	(Croatia) Osijek	
27 June 2026	End of season	GK	(Bosnia and Herzegovina) Haris Mujanić	(Slovenia) Koper	

=== Loans out ===
Start date	End date	Pos.	Player	To	Ref.
23 July 2026	2 September 2026	MF	(Belgium) Jack Senga	(Croatia) Dugopolje	
23 July 2026	2 September 2026	FW	(Portugal) Gelson Rocha	(Croatia) Dugopolje	
23 July 2026	2 September 2026	MF	(Bosnia and Herzegovina) Ante Pokrajčić	(Croatia) Dugopolje	
31 July 2026	31 December 2026	MF	(Bosnia and Herzegovina) Haris Ališah	(Bosnia and Herzegovina) Travnik	
1 August 2026	31 December 2026	DF	(Bosnia and Herzegovina) Nikola Đurić	(Bosnia and Herzegovina) Zvijezda Gradačac	
3 September 2026	End of season	MF	(Bosnia and Herzegovina) Ante Pokrajčić	(Croatia) Hrvace	
3 September 2026	End of season	FW	(Portugal) Gelson Rocha	(Bosnia and Herzegovina) Leotar	
8 September 2026	End of season	MF	(Belgium) Jack Senga	(Bosnia and Herzegovina) Zvijezda Gradačac	

== Kit ==
Supplier	Sponsors	
(Germany) Adidas	(Turkey) Turkish Airlines	Front
(Germany) Adidas	(Bosnia and Herzegovina) Visit Sarajevo (Bosnia and Herzegovina) meridianbet (Bosnia and Herzegovina) BH Telecom	Back

== Pre-season and friendlies ==
Win Draw Loss Fixtures

27 June 2026 Friendly	Sarajevo (Bosnia and Herzegovina)	7–1	(Bosnia and Herzegovina) Velež Mostar	Butmir
18:00 CEST (UTC+2)	Živković 7'; Galešić 29'; Kosi 38'; Mikić 44'; Mehmedović 60'; Ivanišević 67'; Kyeremeh 119'	Report	Mateković 75'	Stadium: Butmir Training Centre
Note: The match was played in two 60-minute halves.

1 July 2026 Friendly	Sutjeska Nikšić (Montenegro)	1–2	(Bosnia and Herzegovina) Sarajevo	Nikšić
19:00 CEST (UTC+2)	Boljević 68' (pen.)	Report	Mikić 18'; Ljajić 59' (pen.)	Stadium: Stadion kraj Bistrice

4 July 2026 Friendly	Zrinjski Mostar (Bosnia and Herzegovina)	2–1	(Bosnia and Herzegovina) Sarajevo	Mostar
9:45 CEST (UTC+2)	Ilić 7'; Nalić 17'	Report	Gojković 43'	Stadium: Rodoč Stadium; Referee: Antoni Bandić (Grude)

24 July 2026 Friendly	Sarajevo (Bosnia and Herzegovina)	1–1	(Bosnia and Herzegovina) Radnik Hadžići	Butmir
17:00 CEST (UTC+2)	Caraballo 43'	Report	Ristić 53'	Stadium: Butmir Training Centre; Attendance: 0

29 July 2026 Friendly	Sarajevo (Bosnia and Herzegovina)	1–0	(Bosnia and Herzegovina) Sloboda Tuzla	Butmir
18:00 CEST (UTC+2)	Živković 87' (pen.)	Report		Stadium: Butmir Training Centre; Attendance: 0

1 August 2026 Friendly	Sarajevo (Bosnia and Herzegovina)	2–0	(Bosnia and Herzegovina) Budućnost Banovići	Butmir
18:00 CEST (UTC+2)	Živković; Kyeremeh	Report		Stadium: Butmir Training Centre; Attendance: 0

25 September 2026 Friendly	Gornji Rahić (Bosnia and Herzegovina)	0–3	(Bosnia and Herzegovina) Sarajevo	Gornji Rahić
16:00 CEST (UTC+2)		Report	Caraballo; Šarić	Stadium: Harf Arena

30 September 2026 Friendly	Vareš (Bosnia and Herzegovina)	1–9	(Bosnia and Herzegovina) Sarajevo	Vareš
17:30 CEST (UTC+2)		Report	Caraballo 11'; Kuprešak 16'; Bašić 23' (o.g.); Agyekum 32'; Mehmedović 35'; Živković 61'; Ristić 75', 90'; Galešić 79'	Stadium: Vareš Majdan Stadium

== Competitions ==
=== Overview ===
Competition	First match	Last match	Starting round	Final position	Record							
Competition	First match	Last match	Starting round	Final position	Pld	W	D	L	GF	GA	GD	Win %
Bosnian Premier League	8 August 2026	30 May 2027	Matchday 1	TBD	14	6	5	3	12	8	+4	42.86
Bosnian Cup	27 October 2026		First round	First round	1	0	1	0	1	1	+0	0.00
Conference League	9 July 2026	16 July 2026	First qualifying round	First qualifying round	2	0	1	1	2	3	−1	0.00
Total					17	6	7	4	15	12	+3	35.29

Last updated: 22 November 2026
Source: Competitions

=== Premier League of Bosnia and Herzegovina ===
==== League table ====
Pos	Team	Pld	W	D	L	GF	GA	GD	Pts	Qualification or relegation
1	Zrinjski Mostar	14	12	1	1	33	8	+25	37	Qualification for the Champions League first qualifying round
2	Borac Banja Luka	13	11	1	1	31	10	+21	34	Qualification to Conference League first qualifying round
3	Sarajevo	13	5	5	3	10	7	+3	20	Qualification to Conference League first qualifying round
4	Široki Brijeg	13	4	5	4	13	14	−1	17	
5	BSK Banja Luka	14	4	4	6	21	23	−2	16	

Updated to match(es) played on 21 November 2026. Source: Rezultati.com
Rules for classification: 1) Points; 2) Goal difference; 3) Goals scored; 4) Head-to-head points; 5) Head-to-head goal difference; 6) Head-to-head away goals (only if two teams); 7) Head-to-head goals scored; 8) Goal difference; 9) Play-off. (Criteria 2 and 3 are not used to decide champion, UEFA competition qualification, or relegation)

==== Results summary ====
Overall								Home						Away					
Pld	W	D	L	GF	GA	GD	Pts	W	D	L	GF	GA	GD	W	D	L	GF	GA	GD
14	6	5	3	12	8	+4	23	5	1	1	8	2	+6	1	4	2	4	6	−2

Source: Sportsport.ba

==== Results by round ====
Round	1	3	4	5	6	2^{1}	7	8	9	10	11	12	13	14	15	16	17	18	19	20	21	22	23	24	25	26	27	28	29	30	31	32	33	34	35	36
Ground	H	H	H	A	H	A	A	H	A	A	H	A	A	H	A	H	A	H	H	A	H	H	A	H	A	H	A	A	H	A	A	H	A	H	A	H
Result	D	W	L	W	W	L	L	W	D	D	W	D	D	W																						
Position	5	4	4	4	3	4	4	3	3	3	3	3	3	3																						
Points	1	4	4	7	10	10	10	13	14	15	18	19	20	23																						

Updated to match(es) played on 22 November 2026. Source: Competitions
A = Away; H = Home; W = Win; D = Draw; L = Loss

^{1} Matchday 2 (vs Željezničar) was postponed due to concert-related pitch damage at Stadion Grbavica.

==== Matches ====
8 August 2026 1	Sarajevo	0–0	Radnik Bijeljina	Mostar
21:00 CEST (UTC+2)	Kuprešak (yellow card) 31'	Report	Radović (yellow card) 7'; Marković (yellow card) 18'; Ijoma (yellow card) 51'; Felix Osei (yellow card) 67'; Šukilović (yellow card) 70'; Klenpić (yellow card) 74'	Stadium: Stadion Rođeni (Note: Match of Round 1 was played at Stadion Rođeni in Mostar due to concert-related pitch damage at Asim Ferhatović Hase Stadium.); Attendance: 1,200; Referee: Antoni Bandić (Grude)

21 August 2026 3	Sarajevo	1–0	BSK Banja Luka	Zenica
20:00 CEST (UTC+2)	Ihnatkov (yellow card) 27'; Barišić 33'; Živković (yellow card) 39'	Report	Keranović (yellow card) 48'	Stadium: Bilino Polje Stadium (Note: Match of Round 3 was played at Bilino Polje Stadium in Zenica due to concert-related pitch damage at Asim Ferhatović Hase Stadium.); Attendance: 400; Referee: Frano Jelić (Široki Brijeg)

29 August 2026 4	Sarajevo	0–1	Zrinjski Mostar	Sarajevo
20:45 CEST (UTC+2)	Banić (yellow card) 53'; Beganović (yellow card) 86'	Report	Ilić 65'; Bilbija (yellow card)	Stadium: Asim Ferhatović Hase Stadium; Attendance: 4,800; Referee: Armin Kukić (Bugojno)

2 September 2026 5	Široki Brijeg	1–2	Sarajevo	Široki Brijeg
20:30 CEST (UTC+2)	Tomić (yellow card) 29'; Matić (yellow card) 42'; Kordić-Gružić (yellow card) 45'; Guedes 79'	Report	Maroodza (yellow card) 38'; Kuprešak (yellow card) 52'; Barišić (penalty missed) 58'; Méité (yellow card) 75'; Elezi (yellow card) 76', (goal) 90+5'; Caraballo 89'; Ivanišević (yellow card) 90+7'	Stadium: Stadion Pecara; Attendance: 2,500; Referee: Ermin Sivac (Zenica)
Note: Sarajevo assistant manager Želimir Mešnjak was cautioned (yellow card) in the 38th minute.

6 September 2026 6	Sarajevo	1–0	Borac Banja Luka	Sarajevo
17:30 CEST (UTC+2)	Barišić (yellow card) 45+1'; Caraballo 54'; Galešić (yellow card) 85'; Banić (yellow card) 90+8'	Report	Juričić (penalty missed) 88'; Rogan (yellow card) 90+5'	Stadium: Asim Ferhatović Hase Stadium; Attendance: 7,700; Referee: Antonio Tomić (Kreševo)
Note: Sarajevo technical staff manager Mustafa Beridan and the manager Zoran Zekić were cautioned (yellow card) in the 87th and 94th minute, respectively. Sarajevo assistant manager Luka Šarlija was sent off (red card) in the 89th minute.

9 September 2026 2 (Note: Match of Round 2 postponed due to concert-related pitch damage at Stadion Grbavica.)	Željezničar	2–0	Sarajevo	Sarajevo
18:00 CEST (UTC+2)	Karamarko (yellow card) 41'; Piloto 47'; Kelmendi (yellow card) 59'; Husković 73'; Ibrišimović (yellow card) 90+3'	Report	Pidro (yellow card) 59'; Ivanišević (yellow card) 71'	Stadium: Stadion Grbavica; Attendance: 9,500; Referee: Nihad Ljajić (Sarajevo)

13 September 2026 7	Velež Mostar	1–0	Sarajevo	Mostar
20:45 CEST (UTC+2)	Rahimić 58'	Report	Méité (yellow card) 64'	Stadium: Stadion Rođeni; Attendance: 3,000; Referee: Haris Halkić (Sanski Most)

20 September 2026 8	Sarajevo	2–0	Sloga Doboj	Sarajevo
20:00 CEST (UTC+2)	Caraballo (yellow card) 15'; Mikić 16'; Dajčer (yellow card) 35'; Méité (yellow card) 39' (yellow-red card) 45'; Elezi 49' (pen.)	Report	Čeliković (yellow card) 15'; García (yellow card) 25'; Savić (yellow card) 48'; Jović (penalty missed) 66'; Veselinović (yellow card) 87'	Stadium: Asim Ferhatović Hase Stadium; Attendance: 3,000; Referee: Antoni Bandić (Grude)

11 October 2026 9	Čelik Zenica	0–0	Sarajevo	Zenica
18:30 CEST (UTC+2)	Šabanović (yellow card) 17'; Mašić (yellow card) 64'; Amoah (yellow card) 90+2'	Report	Šarić (yellow card) 58'; Pidro (yellow card) 62'; Beganović (yellow card) 71'	Stadium: Bilino Polje Stadium; Attendance: 11,000; Referee: Armin Kukić (Bugojno)
Note: Sarajevo technical staff manager Mustafa Beridan was cautioned (yellow card) in the 92nd minute.

17 October 2026 10	Radnik Bijeljina	1–1	Sarajevo	Bijeljina
16:00 CEST (UTC+2)	Ghorzi 58'; Ćosić (yellow card) 62'; Teodorović (yellow card) 77'; Meyapya (yellow card) 90+1'	Report	Caraballo (yellow card) 65'; Barišić 88'; Telalović (yellow card) 90'	Stadium: Bijeljina City Stadium; Attendance: 1,350; Referee: Luka Bilbija (Prijedor)

24 October 2026 11	Sarajevo	2–0	Željezničar	Sarajevo
19:46 CEST (UTC+2)	Caraballo (yellow card) 45+1'; Galešić 90'; Kyeremeh 90+11', (yellow card) 90+12'	Report	Radovac (yellow card) 44'; Ibrišimović (yellow card) 45+1'; Pejić (yellow card) 54'; Kuliš (yellow card) 90+3'	Stadium: Asim Ferhatović Hase Stadium; Attendance: 19,800; Referee: Amin Efendić (Sarajevo)

1 November 2026 12	BSK Banja Luka	1–1	Sarajevo	Krupa na Vrbasu
13:00 CET (UTC+1)	Radošević (yellow card) 54'; Čavić 60'; Erić (yellow card) 71'	Report	Elezi (penalty missed) 2'; Méité (yellow card) 17'; Mikić 65', (yellow card) 89' (yellow-red card) 90'	Stadium: Krupa na Vrbasu Stadium; Attendance: 300; Referee: Frano Jelić (Široki Brijeg)
Note: Sarajevo assistant manager Želimir Mešnjak was cautioned (yellow card) in the 84th minute.

8 November 2026 13	Zrinjski Mostar	0–0	Sarajevo	Mostar
17:30 CET (UTC+1)	Ćavar (yellow card) 83'; Ivančić (yellow card) 90+2'	Report	Ivanišević (yellow card) 69'; Galešić (yellow card) 85'; Maroodza (yellow card) 89'	Stadium: Stadion pod Bijelim Brijegom; Attendance: 2,500; Referee: Aleksandar Njegomirović (Prnjavor)
Note: Sarajevo physiotherapist Eldin Jarović was cautioned (yellow card) in the 89th minute.

22 November 2026 14	Sarajevo	2–1	Široki Brijeg	Sarajevo
17:30 CET (UTC+1)	Barišić 22', 59'; Kyeremeh (yellow card) 57'; Méité (yellow card) 69'	Report	Vukančić (yellow card) 31'; Matić 80'	Stadium: Asim Ferhatović Hase Stadium; Attendance: 2,680; Referee: Dražen Marić (Bijeljina)

29 November 2026 15	Borac Banja Luka	v	Sarajevo	Banja Luka
17:30 CET (UTC+1)				Stadium: Banja Luka City Stadium

2 December 2026 16	Sarajevo	v	Velež Mostar	Sarajevo
				Stadium: Asim Ferhatović Hase Stadium

5 December 2026 17	Sloga Doboj	v	Sarajevo	Doboj
				Stadium: Luke Stadium

12 December 2026 18	Sarajevo	v	Čelik Zenica	Sarajevo
				Stadium: Asim Ferhatović Hase Stadium

6 February 2027 19	Sarajevo	v	Radnik Bijeljina	Sarajevo
				Stadium: Asim Ferhatović Hase Stadium

13 February 2027 20	Željezničar	v	Sarajevo	Sarajevo
				Stadium: Stadion Grbavica

20 February 2027 21	Sarajevo	v	BSK Banja Luka	Sarajevo
				Stadium: Asim Ferhatović Hase Stadium

27 February 2027 22	Sarajevo	v	Zrinjski Mostar	Sarajevo
				Stadium: Asim Ferhatović Hase Stadium

3 March 2027 23	Široki Brijeg	v	Sarajevo	Široki Brijeg
				Stadium: Stadion Pecara

6 March 2027 24	Sarajevo	v	Borac Banja Luka	Sarajevo
				Stadium: Asim Ferhatović Hase Stadium

13 March 2027 25	Velež Mostar	v	Sarajevo	Mostar
				Stadium: Stadion Rođeni

20 March 2027 26	Sarajevo	v	Sloga Doboj	Sarajevo
				Stadium: Asim Ferhatović Hase Stadium

3 April 2027 27	Čelik Zenica	v	Sarajevo	Zenica
				Stadium: Bilino Polje Stadium

10 April 2027 28	Radnik Bijeljina	v	Sarajevo	Bijeljina
				Stadium: Bijeljina City Stadium

17 April 2027 29	Sarajevo	v	Željezničar	Sarajevo
				Stadium: Asim Ferhatović Hase Stadium

24 April 2027 30	BSK Banja Luka	v	Sarajevo	Banja Luka
				Stadium: Čaire Stadium

1 May 2027 31	Zrinjski Mostar	v	Sarajevo	Mostar
				Stadium: Stadion pod Bijelim Brijegom

8 May 2027 32	Sarajevo	v	Široki Brijeg	Sarajevo
				Stadium: Asim Ferhatović Hase Stadium

15 May 2027 33	Borac Banja Luka	v	Sarajevo	Banja Luka
				Stadium: Banja Luka City Stadium

19 May 2027 34	Sarajevo	v	Velež Mostar	Sarajevo
				Stadium: Asim Ferhatović Hase Stadium

23 May 2027 35	Sloga Doboj	v	Sarajevo	Doboj
				Stadium: Luke Stadium

30 May 2027 36	Sarajevo	v	Čelik Zenica	Sarajevo
				Stadium: Asim Ferhatović Hase Stadium

=== Cup of Bosnia and Herzegovina ===
==== Round of 32 ====
27 October 2026	Tomislav	1–1 (4–3 p)	Sarajevo	Tomislavgrad
13:00 CET (UTC+1)	Banović 39'; Miloš (yellow card) 78'; Baškarad (yellow card) 87'; Šiško (yellow card) 90+2'	Report	Barišić 22'	Stadium: Gradski stadion Tomislav; Attendance: 500; Referee: Haris Halkić (Sanski Most)
	Penalties
	Ćerdić (penalty scored); Križanac (penalty scored); Osmić (penalty scored); Miloš (penalty scored); Hasić (penalty missed)		(penalty scored) Elezi; (penalty missed) Mikić; (penalty scored) Šarić; (penalty scored) Pidro; (penalty missed) Barišić
Note: Sarajevo assistant manager Želimir Mešnjak was cautioned (yellow card) in the 79th minute.

=== UEFA Conference League ===
==== First qualifying round ====
9 July 2026 First Leg	Sarajevo (Bosnia and Herzegovina)	1–1	(Finland) Inter Turku	Sarajevo, Bosnia and Herzegovina
21:00 CEST (UTC+2)	Méité (yellow card) 52'; Kuprešak (yellow card) 63'; Barišić 90+4'	Report	Conteh 7'	Stadium: Asim Ferhatović Hase Stadium; Attendance: 10,107; Referee: Fotios Polychronis (Greece)

16 July 2026 Second Leg	Inter Turku (Finland)	2–1 (3–2 agg.)	(Bosnia and Herzegovina) Sarajevo	Turku, Finland
18:00 EEST (UTC+3)	Conteh 58'; Jephta 87', (yellow card) 88'	Report	Kyeremeh 22'; Dajčer (yellow card) 87'	Stadium: Veritas Stadion; Attendance: 2,516; Referee: Karel Rouček (Czech Republic)

== Statistics ==
=== Appearances and goals ===
No.	Pos	Nat	Player	Total		Bosnian Premier League		Bosnian Cup		Conference League	
No.	Pos	Nat	Player	Apps	Goals	Apps	Goals	Apps	Goals	Apps	Goals
Goalkeepers
13	GK	(Bosnia and Herzegovina) BIH	Sanin Mušija	1	0	0	0	1	0	0	0
31	GK	(Croatia) CRO	Ivan Banić	16	0	14	0	0	0	2	0
45	GK	(Bosnia and Herzegovina) BIH	Ibrahim Zahirović	0	0	0	0	0	0	0	0
Defenders
2	DF	(Zimbabwe) ZIM	Shane Maroodza	8	0	3+3	0	0	0	2	0
3	DF	(Bosnia and Herzegovina) BIH	Renato Gojković	2	0	0+1	0	0	0	1	0
6	DF	(Canada) CAN	Jovan Ivanišević	12	0	11	0	1	0	0	0
17	DF	(Slovenia) SLO	Filip Kosi	11	0	2+7	0	1	0	0+1	0
18	DF	(Bosnia and Herzegovina) BIH	Matija Glogovac	6	0	4+1	0	0+1	0	0	0
22	DF	(Bosnia and Herzegovina) BIH	Amar Beganović	16	0	13	0	1	0	2	0
27	DF	(Croatia) CRO	Luka Hujber	9	0	4+2	0	1	0	0+2	0
30	DF	(Croatia) CRO	Luka Dajčer	11	0	10	0	0	0	1	0
38	DF	(Ivory Coast) CIV	Souleymane Méité	13	0	8+3	0	0	0	1+1	0
70	DF	(Bosnia and Herzegovina) BIH	Selmir Pidro	14	0	10+3	0	0+1	0	0	0
77	DF	(Croatia) CRO	Mihael Kuprešak	17	0	9+5	0	1	0	2	0
Midfielders
5	MF	(Bosnia and Herzegovina) BIH	Rijad Telalović	1	0	0+1	0	0	0	0	0
8	MF	(Croatia) CRO	Antonio Galešić	9	1	2+5	1	1	0	0+1	0
14/32	MF	(Bosnia and Herzegovina) BIH	Vedad Leto	3	0	1+2	0	0	0	0	0
16	MF	(Bosnia and Herzegovina) BIH	Muhamed Dreca	1	0	0+1	0	0	0	0	0
20	MF	(North Macedonia) MKD	Agon Elezi	17	2	13+1	2	0+1	0	2	0
29	MF	(Bosnia and Herzegovina) BIH	Amar Cerić	0	0	0	0	0	0	0	0
35	MF	(Ukraine) UKR	Serhiy Ihnatkov	11	0	8+3	0	0	0	0	0
55	MF	(Bosnia and Herzegovina) BIH	Kenan Vrban	0	0	0	0	0	0	0	0
59	MF	(Bosnia and Herzegovina) BIH	Gojko Cimirot	9	0	2+4	0	1	0	1+1	0
Forwards
7	FW	(Croatia) CRO	Ivan Šarić	15	0	11+3	0	0+1	0	0	0
9	FW	(Croatia) CRO	Leo Mikić	11	2	7+1	2	0+1	0	2	0
11	FW	(Ghana) GHA	Francis Kyeremeh	12	2	4+5	1	1	0	2	1
19	FW	(Colombia) COL	Ricardo Caraballo	9	2	4+5	2	0	0	0	0
23	FW	(Denmark) DEN	Jonathan Agyekum	6	0	0+4	0	0	0	0+2	0
24	FW	(Croatia) CRO	Filip Živković	11	0	5+5	0	1	0	0	0
25	FW	(Spain) ESP	Junior Awusi	0	0	0	0	0	0	0	0
99	FW	(Croatia) CRO	Bartol Barišić	16	6	9+4	4	1	1	0+2	1
Players transferred out during the season
4	DF	(Bosnia and Herzegovina) BIH	Nermin Mujkić	0	0	0	0	0	0	0	0
10	MF	(Serbia) SRB	Adem Ljajić	2	0	0	0	0	0	2	0
33	DF	(North Macedonia) MKD	Stefan Ristovski	2	0	0	0	0	0	2	0

Number after the "+" sign represents the number of games player started the game on the bench and was substituted on.

=== Goalscorers ===
Rank	No.	Pos.	Nat.	Player	Bosnian Premier League	Bosnian Cup	Conference League	Total
1	99	FW	(Croatia)	Bartol Barišić	4	1	1	6
2	9	FW	(Croatia)	Leo Mikić	2	0	0	2
2	11	FW	(Ghana)	Francis Kyeremeh	1	0	1	2
2	19	FW	(Colombia)	Ricardo Caraballo	2	0	0	2
2	20	MF	(North Macedonia)	Agon Elezi	2	0	0	2
6	8	MF	(Croatia)	Antonio Galešić	1	0	0	1
Total					12	1	2	15

=== Clean sheets ===
Rank	No.	Nat.	Player	Bosnian Premier League	Bosnian Cup	Conference League	Total
1	31	(Croatia)	Ivan Banić	7	0	0	7
Total				7	0	0	7

=== Disciplinary record ===
N	P	Nat.	Name	Bosnian Premier League			Bosnian Cup			Conference League			Total			Notes
N	P	Nat.	Name	Yellow card	Second yellow card	Red card	Yellow card	Second yellow card	Red card	Yellow card	Second yellow card	Red card	Yellow card	Second yellow card	Red card	Notes
2	DF	(Zimbabwe)	Shane Maroodza	2									2			
5	MF	(Bosnia and Herzegovina)	Rijad Telalović	1									1			
6	DF	(Canada)	Jovan Ivanišević	3									3			
7	FW	(Croatia)	Ivan Šarić	1									1			
8	MF	(Croatia)	Antonio Galešić	2									2			
9	FW	(Croatia)	Leo Mikić		1									1		
11	FW	(Ghana)	Francis Kyeremeh	2									2			
19	FW	(Colombia)	Ricardo Caraballo	3									3			
20	MF	(North Macedonia)	Agon Elezi	1									1			
22	DF	(Bosnia and Herzegovina)	Amar Beganović	2									2			
24	FW	(Croatia)	Filip Živković	1									1			
30	DF	(Croatia)	Luka Dajčer	1						1			2			
31	GK	(Croatia)	Ivan Banić	2									2			
35	MF	(Ukraine)	Serhiy Ihnatkov	1									1			
38	DF	(Ivory Coast)	Souleymane Méité	4	1					1			5	1		
70	DF	(Bosnia and Herzegovina)	Selmir Pidro	2									2			
77	DF	(Croatia)	Mihael Kuprešak	2						1			3			
99	FW	(Croatia)	Bartol Barišić	1									1			
		(Croatia)	Zoran Zekić	1									1			Manager
		(Croatia)	Želimir Mešnjak	2			1						3			Assistant manager
		(Croatia)	Luka Šarlija			1									1	Assistant manager
		(Bosnia and Herzegovina)	Eldin Jarović	1									1			Physiotherapist
		(Bosnia and Herzegovina)	Mustafa Beridan	2									2			Technical staff manager

Source: Competitive matches
Only competitive matches
(yellow card) = Number of bookings; (second yellow card) = Number of sending offs after a second yellow card; (red card) = Number of sending offs by a direct red card.

=== Games as captain ===
Rank	No.	Pos.	Nat.	Player	Bosnian Premier League	Bosnian Cup	Conference League	Total
1	22	DF	(Bosnia and Herzegovina)	Amar Beganović	13	1	0	14
2	10	MF	(Serbia)	Adem Ljajić	0	0	2	2
3	59	MF	(Bosnia and Herzegovina)	Gojko Cimirot	1	0	0	1
Total					14	1	2	17
