= 2026–27 FK Željezničar season =

Željezničar
2026–27 season
- Chairman: Sanin Mirvić (until 30 June); Jusuf Tanović (interim, from 6 July) (Note: Tanović is chairman of the provisional Emergency Committee.)
- Manager: David Muslera Rodríguez
- Stadium: Grbavica Stadium
- Premier League BiH: 6th
- Kup BiH: Round of 16
- Top goalscorer: League: Muharem Husković; Rodrigo Piloto (3 each); All: Aleksa Pejić; Muharem Husković; Rodrigo Piloto (3 each)
- Highest home attendance: 10,500 vs Čelik (18 September 2026)
- Lowest home attendance: 6,000 vs Zrinjski (31 October 2026)
- Average home league attendance: 8,258

The 2026–27 season is Željezničar's 106th in existence and their 27th season in the Bosnian Premier League. Besides competing in the domestic league, the team will also compete in the National Cup.

== First-team squad ==
N	Pos.	Nat.	Name	Age	EU	Since	App	Goals	Ends	Transfer fee	Notes
Goalkeepers
1	GK	(Bosnia and Herzegovina)	Tarik Abdulahović	28	Non-EU	2024	23	0	2027	Free	Originally from youth system
41	GK	(Spain)	Ángel Jiménez	24	EU	2026	0	0	2027	Free	
99	GK	(Bosnia and Herzegovina)	Alvin Ćosić	19	Non-EU	2025	0	0	2027	Free	
Defenders
4	DF	(Croatia)	Marin Karamarko	28	EU	2026	61	1	2028	Free	
5	DF	(Bosnia and Herzegovina)	Amar Ibrišimović	19	Non-EU	2026	14	0	2027	Free	On loan from Schalke 04 II
15	DF	(Bosnia and Herzegovina)	Bojan Nastić	32	Non-EU	2026	20	0	2028	Free	
20	DF	(Curaçao)	Giovanni Troupée	28	EU	2025	17	0	2027	Free	
24	DF	(Bosnia and Herzegovina)	Ajdin Raščić	18	Non-EU	2026	13	0	2029	Youth system	Originally from youth system
30	DF	(Germany)	Marko Karamarko	33	EU	2026	11	0	2027	Free	
32	DF	(Slovenia)	Sandro Jovanović	24	EU	2026	5	0	2028	Free	
33	DF	(Netherlands)	Collin Seedorf	31	EU	2025	36	3	2027	Free	
Midfielders
6	MF	(Serbia)	Aleksa Pejić (captain)	27	Non-EU	2026	30	3	2028	Free	
7	MF	(Senegal)	Yacouba Dabo	24	Non-EU	2026	11	0	2028	Free	
8	MF	(Bosnia and Herzegovina)	Afan Fočo	19	Non-EU	2024	22	0	2030	Youth system	Originally from youth system
10	MF	(Bosnia and Herzegovina)	Madžid Šošić	24	Non-EU	2025	44	11	2027	Free	Originally from youth system
11	MF	(North Macedonia)	Matej Cvetanoski	29	Non-EU	2024	64	10	2027	Free	
14	MF	(Portugal)	Afonso Vitorino	20	EU	2026	0	0	2028	Free	
16	MF	(Bosnia and Herzegovina)	Dženan Šabić	20	Non-EU	2022	61	2	2028	Youth system	Originally from youth system
22	MF	(Bosnia and Herzegovina)	Admir Gojak	19	Non-EU	2025	10	0	2027	Youth system	Originally from youth system
23	MF	(Bosnia and Herzegovina)	Eldar Dragović	18	Non-EU	2026	25	2	2030	Youth system	Originally from youth system
27	MF	(Bosnia and Herzegovina)	Deni Milošević	31	Non-EU	2025	43	0	2027	Free	
28	MF	(Liberia)	Jonathan Freeman	19	Non-EU	2025	10	0	2026	Free	
34	MF	(Turkey)	Doruk Tuğrul	20	Non-EU	2026	0	0	2028	Free	
55	MF	(Bosnia and Herzegovina)	Armin Hodžić	26	Non-EU	2026	48	8	2028	Free	
88	MF	(Bosnia and Herzegovina)	Samir Radovac	30	Non-EU	2024	68	1	2027	Free	
Forwards
9	FW	(Bosnia and Herzegovina)	Aldian Korora	17	Non-EU	2025	15	1	2028	Free	
19	FW	(Croatia)	Ante Kuliš	17	EU	2026	3	0	2027	Free	
29	FW	(Austria)	Muharem Husković	23	EU	2026	20	3	2028	Free	
49	FW	(Brazil)	Gabriel Cunha	22	Non-EU	2026	11	2	2028	Free	
90	FW	(Portugal)	Rodrigo Piloto	25	EU	2026	6	3	2027	Free	

- Last updated: 7 November 2026
- Source: fkzeljeznicar.ba
- Ordered by squad number.

== Transfers ==
=== In ===
No.	Pos.	Player	Transferred from	Fee	Date	Source
7	MF	(Senegal) Yacouba Dabo	(Spain) Ejea	Free transfer	18 July 2026	
14	MF	(Portugal) Afonso Vitorino	(Portugal) Marinhense	Free transfer	18 July 2026	
41	GK	(Spain) Ángel Jiménez	(Spain) Ponferradina	Free transfer	18 July 2026	
17	MF	(Mexico) Jorge Guzmán	(Mexico) Tapatío	Free transfer	30 July 2026	
49	FW	(Brazil) Gabriel Cunha	(Brazil) Caldense	Free transfer	31 July 2026	
30	DF	(Germany) Marko Karamarko	(Lithuania) Riteriai	Free transfer	3 August 2026	
4	DF	(Croatia) Marin Karamarko	(Poland) Wisła Płock	Free transfer	24 August 2026	
90	FW	(Portugal) Rodrigo Piloto	(Andorra) Atlètic d'Escaldes	Free transfer	24 August 2026	
19	FW	(Croatia) Ante Kuliš	Free agent	Free transfer	25 August 2026	
34	MF	(Turkey) Doruk Tuğrul	(Turkey) Beşiktaş U19	Free transfer	3 September 2026	
32	DF	(Slovenia) Sandro Jovanović	(Slovenia) Koper	Free transfer	4 September 2026	
Total				€0		

=== Out ===
No.	Pos.	Player	Transferred to	Fee	Date	Source
2	DF	(Nigeria) Edwin Odinaka	(Ukraine) Bukovyna Chernivtsi	End of contract	2 June 2026	
13	GK	(Bosnia and Herzegovina) Vedad Muftić	(Cyprus) AEK Larnaca	End of contract	2 June 2026	
60	FW	(United States) Santiago Garcia	(Uzbekistan) Surkhon	End of contract	2 June 2026	
7	FW	(Bosnia and Herzegovina) Sulejman Krpić	Stupčanica	End of contract	3 June 2026	
90	DF	(Luxembourg) Edin Osmanović	(Thailand) BG Pathum United	Contract termination	8 June 2026	
11	MF	(Brazil) Vini Peixoto	(Japan) Hokkaido Consadole Sapporo	End of contract	22 June 2026	
9	FW	(Bosnia and Herzegovina) Hamza Jaganjac	(Croatia) Istra 1961	Loan return	27 June 2026	
99	FW	(Serbia) Davor Rakić	(Cyprus) Anagennisi Deryneia	Contract termination	8 July 2026	
4	DF	(Bosnia and Herzegovina) Ermin Bičakčić	(Malta) Valletta	End of contract	13 July 2026	
19	DF	(Bosnia and Herzegovina) Mustafa Šukilović	Radnik Bijeljina	End of contract	13 July 2026	
8	MF	(Austria) Dominik Prokop	(Cyprus) Olympiakos Nicosia	Contract termination	14 July 2026	
21	FW	(Netherlands) Joey Konings	Free agent	Contract termination	31 July 2026	
34	MF	(Morocco) Ismail Oulad M'Hand	(Netherlands) VVV-Venlo	Contract termination	31 July 2026	
3	DF	(Bosnia and Herzegovina) Enes Alić	(Scotland) St Johnstone	Contract termination	24 August 2026	
17	MF	(Mexico) Jorge Guzmán	Free agent	Contract termination	19 October 2026	
Total				€0		

=== Loans in ===
No.	Pos.	Player	Loaned from	Fee	Date	On loan until	Source
5	DF	(Bosnia and Herzegovina) Amar Ibrišimović	(Germany) Schalke 04 II	None	1 August 2026	30 June 2027	
Total						€0	

=== Loans out ===
No.	Pos.	Player	Loaned to	Fee	Date	On loan until	Source
17	MF	(Nigeria) Olanrewaju Ibraheem	Zvijezda Gradačac	None	17 July 2026	30 June 2027	
Total				€0			

== Coaching staff ==
Position	Name
Head coach	(Spain) David Muslera Rodríguez
Assistant coach	(Bosnia and Herzegovina) Sabit Šljivo
Goalkeeping coach	(Bosnia and Herzegovina) Kenan Hasagić
Fitness coach	(Slovenia) Matic Lukman Čoko
Video analyst	(Bosnia and Herzegovina) Emil Šabanović
Scout	(Bosnia and Herzegovina) Milan Gutović
Team manager	(Bosnia and Herzegovina) Aleksandar Kosorić
Doctors	(Bosnia and Herzegovina) Zlatko Dervišević
Doctors	(Bosnia and Herzegovina) Harun Đozić
Doctors	(Bosnia and Herzegovina) Mahir Moro
Physiotherapists	(Bosnia and Herzegovina) Raif Zeba
Physiotherapists	(Bosnia and Herzegovina) Adil Hubijar
Physiotherapists	(Bosnia and Herzegovina) Emir Kraljušić
Commissioner for Security	(Bosnia and Herzegovina) Erdijan Pekić

- Last updated: 1 August 2026
- Source: fkzeljeznicar.ba

== Competitions ==
=== Pre-season ===
18 July 2026 Friendly	Željezničar (Bosnia and Herzegovina)	0–4	(Ukraine) Karpaty Lviv	Šmartno ob Paki, Slovenia
17:00		Report	Dyedov 14', 32'; Sych 43', 50'	Stadium: Šmartno Stadium

21 July 2026 Friendly	Željezničar (Bosnia and Herzegovina)	1–1	(Slovenia) Bistrica	Sveti Martin na Muri, Croatia
18:00	Radovac 45'	Report		Stadium: NK Polet Stadium

24 July 2026 Friendly	Rudeš (Croatia)	2–2	(Bosnia and Herzegovina) Željezničar	Zagreb, Croatia
17:00		Report	Milošević 64'; Raščić 86'	Stadium: ŠC Rudeš

1 August 2026 Friendly	Željezničar (Bosnia and Herzegovina)	0–3	(Bosnia and Herzegovina) Sloboda Tuzla	Sarajevo
18:00		Report	Tiro 1'; Mehanović 73'; Bonyanga 80'	Stadium: Grbavica Stadium

=== Overall ===
Competition	Started round	Final result	First match	Last Match
Premier League BiH	—N/a		7 August 2026	
Kup BiH	First round		27 October 2026	

=== League table ===
Pos	Team	Pld	W	D	L	GF	GA	GD	Pts
4	Široki Brijeg	13	4	5	4	13	14	−1	17
5	BSK Banja Luka	13	4	4	5	20	21	−1	16
6	Željezničar	13	3	4	6	13	21	−8	13
7	Velež Mostar	12	3	3	6	10	18	−8	12
8	Čelik Zenica	13	2	5	6	14	20	−6	11

Updated to match(es) played on 8 November 2026. Source: Rezultati.com
Rules for classification: 1) Points; 2) Goal difference; 3) Goals scored; 4) Head-to-head points; 5) Head-to-head goal difference; 6) Head-to-head away goals (only if two teams); 7) Head-to-head goals scored; 8) Goal difference; 9) Play-off. (Criteria 2 and 3 are not used to decide champion, UEFA competition qualification, or relegation)

==== Results summary ====
Overall								Home						Away					
Pld	W	D	L	GF	GA	GD	Pts	W	D	L	GF	GA	GD	W	D	L	GF	GA	GD
13	3	4	6	13	21	−8	13	3	2	1	9	8	+1	0	2	5	4	13	−9

Last updated: 7 November 2026.
Source: Sportsport.ba

==== Results by round ====
Round	1	3	4	5	6	2^{1}	7	8	9	10	11	12	13	14	15	16	17	18	19	20	21	22	23	24	25	26	27	28	29	30	31	32	33	34	35	36	37
Ground	H	A	H	A	H	H	A	H	A	A	A	H	A	H	A	H	A	H	H	H	A	H	A	H	A	H	A	A	A	H	A	H	A	H	A	H	
Result	W	L	D	L	W	W	D	D	L	D	L	L	L																								
Position	2	6	5	7	6	3	3	4	4	5	5	6	6																								
Points	3	3	4	4	7	10	11	12	12	13	13	13	13																								

Updated to match(es) played on 7 November 2026. Source: Competitions
A = Away; H = Home; W = Win; D = Draw; L = Loss

^{1}Match of Round 2 was postponed due to potential concert-related damage to the pitch.

==== Matches ====
7 August 2026 1	Željezničar	2–1	BSK Banja Luka	Sarajevo
20:00	Šabić (yellow card) 60'; Korora 65'; Husković 85', (yellow card) 90+2'	Report	Čulina (yellow card) 57'; Čavić 70'; Ljubić (yellow card) 90+4'	Stadium: Grbavica Stadium; Attendance: 7,000; Referee: Josip Martinović (Čapljina)

23 August 2026 3	Zrinjski Mostar	2–0	Željezničar	Mostar
21:00	Đurasek 27'; Bilbija 47'; Barišić (yellow card) 58'	Report	Nastić (yellow card) 63'	Stadium: Stadion pod Bijelim Brijegom; Attendance: 4,500; Referee: Aleksandar Njegomirović (Prnjavor)

29 August 2026 4	Željezničar	1–1	Široki Brijeg	Sarajevo
18:00	Husković 69'	Report	F. Matić 77'	Stadium: Grbavica Stadium; Attendance: 9,347; Referee: Dragan Kesić (Gradiška)

2 September 2026 5	Borac Banja Luka	2–0	Željezničar	Banja Luka
20:30	Juričić 45'; Roguljić 52'; Hiroš (yellow card) 60'	Report	Raščić (yellow card) 8'; Dabo (yellow card) 67'	Stadium: Banja Luka City Stadium; Attendance: 3,000; Referee: Mateo Musa (Čitluk)

6 September 2026 6	Željezničar	3–1	Velež Mostar	Sarajevo
17:30	Dabo (yellow card) 7'; Dragović 20'; Pejić 28'; Cunha 85'	Report	Stojanović 59'	Stadium: Grbavica Stadium; Attendance: 7,200; Referee: Miloš Gigović (Gradiška)

9 September 2026 2 (Note: Match of Round 2, scheduled for 15 August 2026, was postponed for 9 September due to potential concert-related damage to the pitch.)	Željezničar	2–0	Sarajevo	Sarajevo
18:00	Marko Karamarko (yellow card) 41'; Piloto 47'; Kelmendi (yellow card) 59'; Husković 73'; Ibrišimović (yellow card) 90+3'	Report	Pidro (yellow card) 59'; Ivanišević (yellow card) 71'	Stadium: Grbavica Stadium; Attendance: 9,500; Referee: Nihad Ljajić (Sarajevo)

13 September 2026 7	Sloga Doboj	1–1	Željezničar	Doboj
18:30	Ferni 17'; Corral (yellow card) 60'	Report	Pejić (yellow card) 51'; Piloto 64'; Radovac (yellow card) 81'; Dragović (yellow card) 90+6'	Stadium: Luke Stadium; Attendance: 2,200; Referee: Aleksandar Njegomirović (Prnjavor)

18 September 2026 8	Željezničar	1–1	Čelik Zenica	Sarajevo
20:00	Pejić 80'	Report	Hrvanović (yellow card) 39'; Šarkić 56'; Gogić (yellow card) 83'	Stadium: Grbavica Stadium; Attendance: 10,500; Referee: Mirza Kazlagić (Cazin)

11 October 2026 9	Radnik Bijeljina	3–1	Željezničar	Bijeljina
15:00	Andačić (yellow card) 40'; Bradonjić 48', 85', (yellow card) 85'; Marin Karamarko 64' (o.g.); Ćosić (yellow card) 80'	Report	Stevanović 15' (o.g.); Piloto (yellow card) 57'; Marko Karamarko (yellow card) 68'; Jovanović (yellow card) 70'	Stadium: Bijeljina City Stadium; Attendance: 500; Referee: Frano Jelić (Široki Brijeg)

17 October 2026 10	BSK Banja Luka	1–1	Željezničar	Banja Luka
13:00	Čulina (yellow card) 63'; Erić (yellow card) 66'; Čavić 77' (pen.)	Report	Piloto 43'; Raščić (yellow card) 55'; Pejić (yellow card) 68'; Jovanović (yellow card) 86'	Stadium: Stadion Čaire; Attendance: 200; Referee: Mateo Musa (Čitluk)

24 October 2026 11	Sarajevo	2–0	Željezničar	Sarajevo
19:46	Caraballo (yellow card) 45'; Galešić 90'; Kyeremeh 90+12', (yellow card) 90+12'	Report	Radovac (yellow card) 45'; Ibrišimović (yellow card) 45+1'; Pejić (yellow card) 53'; Kuliš (yellow card) 90+3'	Stadium: Asim Ferhatović Hase Stadium; Attendance: 19,800; Referee: Amin Efendić (Sarajevo)

31 October 2026 12	Željezničar	0–4	Zrinjski Mostar	Sarajevo
16:00	Marko Karamarko (yellow card) 30'; Gojak (yellow card) 61'; Jovanović (yellow card) 82'	Report	Lagumdžija (yellow card) 28'; Ivančić 34'; Ilić 36'; Bilbija 40'; Mamić (yellow card) 55', (goal) 77'	Stadium: Grbavica Stadium; Attendance: 6,000; Referee: Luka Bilbija (Prijedor)

7 November 2026 13	Široki Brijeg	2–1	Željezničar	Široki Brijeg
18:30	F. Matić 21'; Markovina 90+2'	Report	Cunha 33'; Ibrišimović (yellow card) 67'	Stadium: Pecara Stadium; Attendance: 1,500; Referee: Dragan Petrović (Banja Luka)

21 November 2026 14	Željezničar	v	Borac Banja Luka	Sarajevo
16:00				Stadium: Grbavica Stadium; Referee: Mateo Musa (Čitluk)

28 November 2026 15	Velež Mostar	v	Željezničar	Mostar
				Stadium: Stadion Rođeni

2 December 2026 16	Željezničar	v	Sloga Doboj	Sarajevo
				Stadium: Grbavica Stadium

5 December 2026 17	Čelik Zenica	v	Željezničar	Zenica
				Stadium: Bilino Polje Stadium

12 December 2026 18	Željezničar	v	Radnik Bijeljina	Sarajevo
				Stadium: Grbavica Stadium

6 February 2027 19	Željezničar	v	BSK Banja Luka	Sarajevo
				Stadium: Grbavica Stadium

13 February 2027 20	Željezničar	v	Sarajevo	Sarajevo
				Stadium: Grbavica Stadium

20 February 2027 21	Zrinjski Mostar	v	Željezničar	Mostar
				Stadium: Stadion pod Bijelim Brijegom

27 February 2027 22	Željezničar	v	Široki Brijeg	Sarajevo
				Stadium: Grbavica Stadium

3 March 2027 23	Borac Banja Luka	v	Željezničar	Banja Luka
				Stadium: Banja Luka City Stadium

6 March 2027 24	Željezničar	v	Velež Mostar	Sarajevo
				Stadium: Grbavica Stadium

13 March 2027 25	Sloga Doboj	v	Željezničar	Doboj
				Stadium: Luke Stadium

20 March 2027 26	Željezničar	v	Čelik Zenica	Sarajevo
				Stadium: Grbavica Stadium

3 April 2027 27	Radnik Bijeljina	v	Željezničar	Bijeljina
				Stadium: Bijeljina City Stadium

10 April 2027 28	BSK Banja Luka	v	Željezničar	Banja Luka
				Stadium: Stadion Čaire

17 April 2027 29	Sarajevo	v	Željezničar	Sarajevo
				Stadium: Asim Ferhatović Hase Stadium

24 April 2027 30	Željezničar	v	Zrinjski Mostar	Sarajevo
				Stadium: Grbavica Stadium

1 May 2027 31	Široki Brijeg	v	Željezničar	Široki Brijeg
				Stadium: Pecara Stadium

8 May 2027 32	Željezničar	v	Borac Banja Luka	Sarajevo
				Stadium: Grbavica Stadium

15 May 2027 33	Velež Mostar	v	Željezničar	Mostar
				Stadium: Stadion Rođeni

19 May 2027 34	Željezničar	v	Sloga Doboj	Sarajevo
				Stadium: Grbavica Stadium

23 May 2027 35	Čelik Zenica	v	Željezničar	Zenica
				Stadium: Bilino Polje Stadium

30 May 2027 36	Željezničar	v	Radnik Bijeljina	Sarajevo
				Stadium: Grbavica Stadium

=== Kup BiH ===
==== Round of 32 ====
27 October 2026	Sloboda Tuzla	0–1	Željezničar	Tuzla
20:30	Redžić (yellow card) 30'; Kapetanović (yellow card) 84'	Report	Dabo (yellow card) 22'; Pejić 30' (pen.), (yellow card) 34'; Ibrišimović (yellow card) 45+1'; Husković (yellow card) 70'; Raščić (yellow card) 83'; Jovanović (yellow card) 90+2'	Stadium: Tušanj City Stadium; Attendance: 3,500; Referee: Antoni Bandić (Grude)

==== Round of 16 ====
February 2027	v

== Statistics ==
=== Goalscorers ===
As of 7 November 2026

Rank	No.	Pos.	Nat.	Player	Premier League BiH	Kup BiH	Total
1	6	MF	(Serbia)	Aleksa Pejić	2	1	3
1	29	FW	(Austria)	Muharem Husković	3	—	3
1	90	FW	(Portugal)	Rodrigo Piloto	3	—	3
4	49	FW	(Brazil)	Gabriel Cunha	2	—	2
5	9	FW	(Bosnia and Herzegovina)	Aldian Korora	1	—	1
5	23	MF	(Bosnia and Herzegovina)	Eldar Dragović	1	—	1
Own goals (from the opponents)					1	—	1
Totals					13	1	14

=== Assists ===
As of 7 November 2026

Rank	No.	Pos.	Nat.	Player	Premier League BiH	Kup BiH	Total
1	6	MF	(Serbia)	Aleksa Pejić	3	—	3
2	15	DF	(Bosnia and Herzegovina)	Bojan Nastić	2	—	2
3	5	DF	(Bosnia and Herzegovina)	Amar Ibrišimović	1	—	1
3	10	MF	(Bosnia and Herzegovina)	Madžid Šošić	1	—	1
3	19	FW	(Croatia)	Ante Kuliš	1	—	1
3	23	MF	(Bosnia and Herzegovina)	Eldar Dragović	1	—	1
3	27	MF	(Bosnia and Herzegovina)	Deni Milošević	1	—	1
3	29	FW	(Austria)	Muharem Husković	—	1	1
Totals					10	1	11

=== Clean sheets ===
As of 7 November 2026

Rank	No.	Nat.	Player	Premier League BiH	Kup BiH	Total
1	1	(Bosnia and Herzegovina)	Tarik Abdulahović	1	1	2
Totals				1	1	2

=== Disciplinary record ===
As of 7 November 2026

No.	Pos.	Nat.	Name	Premier League BiH			Kup BiH			Total		
No.	Pos.	Nat.	Name	Yellow card	(yellow card) (yellow-red card)	Red card	Yellow card	(yellow card) (yellow-red card)	Red card	Yellow card	(yellow card) (yellow-red card)	Red card
5	DF	(Bosnia and Herzegovina)	Amar Ibrišimović	3			1			4		
6	MF	(Bosnia and Herzegovina)	Aleksa Pejić	3			1			4		
32	DF	(Slovenia)	Sandro Jovanović	3			1			4		
7	MF	(Senegal)	Yacouba Dabo	2			1			3		
24	DF	(Bosnia and Herzegovina)	Ajdin Raščić	2			1			3		
30	DF	(Germany)	Marko Karamarko	3						3		
29	FW	(Austria)	Muharem Husković	1			1			2		
88	MF	(Bosnia and Herzegovina)	Samir Radovac	2						2		
15	DF	(Bosnia and Herzegovina)	Bojan Nastić	1						1		
16	MF	(Bosnia and Herzegovina)	Dženan Šabić	1						1		
19	FW	(Croatia)	Ante Kuliš	1						1		
22	MF	(Bosnia and Herzegovina)	Admir Gojak	1						1		
23	MF	(Bosnia and Herzegovina)	Eldar Dragović	1						1		
25	DF	(Bosnia and Herzegovina)	Daris Kelmendi	1						1		
90	FW	(Portugal)	Rodrigo Piloto	1						1		
Totals				26			6			32		

Source: Competitive matches and fkzeljeznicar.ba
Ordered by (red card) , (second yellow card) and (yellow card)
(yellow card) = Number of bookings; (second yellow card) = Number of sending offs after a second yellow card; (red card) = Number of sending offs by a direct red card.
