= Karamarko =

Karamarko is a Serbo-Croatian surname, a patronymic derived from the nickname Karamarko (from kara, "black", and masculine given name Marko). Notable people with the surname include:

- Marin Karamarko (born 1998), Croatian footballer
- Marko Karamarko (born 1993), German footballer
- Tomislav Karamarko (born 1959), Croatian politician

== See also ==
- Kara-Marko Vasić, Serbian revolutionary
