= Prince Mumba =

Prince Mumba may refer to:

- Prince Mumba (athlete) (born 1984), Zambian runner
- Prince Mumba (footballer) (born 2001), Zambian football midfielder
