= Ivan Šarić (footballer) =

Croatian footballer

Personal information
- Date of birth: 16 January 2001 (age 25)
- Place of birth: Split, Croatia
- Height: 1.77 m (5 ft 10 in)
- Positions: Forward; winger

Team information
- Current team: Sarajevo
- Number: 7

Youth career
- 2010–2012: Split
- 2012–2018: Hajduk Split

Senior career*
| Years | Team | Apps | (Gls) |
| 2018–2021 | Hajduk Split II | 32 | (13) |
| 2021–2022 | Hajduk Split | 1 | (0) |
| 2021–2022 | → Radomlje (loan) | 34 | (7) |
| 2023–2024 | Mura | 29 | (0) |
| 2024–2026 | Velež Mostar | 45 | (6) |
| 2026– | Sarajevo | 14 | (0) |

International career
| 2017 | Croatia U16 | 3 | (0) |
| 2017–2018 | Croatia U17 | 13 | (4) |
| 2019–2020 | Croatia U19 | 7 | (2) |
- * Club domestic league appearances and goals as of 22 November 2026

Ivan Šarić (born 16 January 2001) is a Croatian professional footballer who plays as a forward for Bosnian Premier League club Sarajevo.

== Club career ==
In July 2021, Šarić joined Slovenian PrvaLiga side Radomlje on a season-long loan from Hajduk Split.

On 25 July 2026, Šarić signed a two-year contract with Bosnian side FK Sarajevo.

== Career statistics ==
As of match played 22 November 2026

Appearances and goals by club, season and competition
| Club | Season | League | | | National cup (Note: Includes Croatian Cup, Slovenian Cup, Bosnian Cup) | | Continental | | Total | |
| Club | Season | Division | Apps | Goals | Apps | Goals | Apps | Goals | Apps | Goals |
|---|---|---|---|---|---|---|---|---|---|---|
| Hajduk Split II | 2018–19 | Prva NL | 2 | 0 | — | | — | | 2 | 0 |
| Hajduk Split II | 2019–20 | Prva NL | 4 | 0 | — | | — | | 4 | 0 |
| Hajduk Split II | 2020–21 | Prva NL | 26 | 13 | — | | — | | 26 | 13 |
| Hajduk Split II | Total | | 32 | 13 | — | | — | | 32 | 13 |
| Radomlje (loan) | 2021–22 | Slovenian PrvaLiga | 34 | 7 | 2 | 0 | — | | 36 | 7 |
| Hajduk Split | 2022–23 | Croatian Football League | 1 | 0 | 2 | 1 | 0 | 0 | 3 | 1 |
| Mura | 2022–23 | Slovenian PrvaLiga | 15 | 0 | — | | — | | 15 | 0 |
| Mura | 2023–24 | Slovenian PrvaLiga | 14 | 0 | 3 | 0 | — | | 17 | 0 |
| Mura | Total | | 29 | 0 | 3 | 0 | — | | 32 | 0 |
| Velež Mostar | 2024–25 | Bosnian Premier League | 13 | 0 | 1 | 0 | — | | 14 | 0 |
| Velež Mostar | 2025–26 | Bosnian Premier League | 32 | 6 | 8 | 4 | — | | 40 | 10 |
| Velež Mostar | Total | | 45 | 6 | 9 | 4 | — | | 54 | 10 |
| Sarajevo | 2026–27 | Bosnian Premier League | 14 | 0 | 1 | 0 | — | | 15 | 0 |
| Career total | | | 155 | 26 | 17 | 5 | 0 | 0 | 172 | 31 |
