= Leo Mikić =

Croatian footballer (born 1997)

Personal information
- Date of birth: 6 May 1997 (age 29)
- Place of birth: Požega, Croatia
- Height: 1.80 m (5 ft 11 in)
- Position: Right midfielder

Team information
- Current team: Sarajevo
- Number: 9

Youth career
- Dinamo Zagreb

Senior career*
Years	Team	Apps	(Gls)
–2018	Slavija Pleternica		
2018–2019	Lustenau 07	43	(38)
2019–2021	Kapfenberger SV	44	(9)
2021–2023	SV Ried	56	(7)
2023–2024	Jeonnam Dragons	9	(1)
2024–2025	Austria Lustenau	32	(2)
2025–2026	Zrinjski Mostar	28	(2)
2026–	Sarajevo	8	(2)
- * Club domestic league appearances and goals as of 22 November 2026

Leo Mikić (born 6 May 1997) is a Croatian professional footballer who plays as a right midfielder for Bosnian Premier League club Sarajevo.

== Career ==
Born in Požega, Mikic played with the youth team of Dinamo Zagreb, and after spells with several other clubs, started his senior career at NK Slavija Pleternica in the Treća HNL. He joined Austrian club FC Lustenau 07 in the fifth-tier Austrian 2. Landesliga in 2018, after being scouted by a player he played against. From March until the end of the season, Mikic scored 10 goals in 13 appearances. After scoring 28 goals in 30 league matches across the 2018–19 season as Kapfenberg won their division, he signed for 2. Liga club Kapfenberger SV on a one-year contract with an option to extend in summer 2019. After 2 years at Kapfenburg, in which he scored 9 goals in 44 matches, he joined Austrian Football Bundesliga club SV Ried in summer 2021. He scored 5 goals in 29 matches in his debut season in the division.

On 5 January 2024, Mikić signed with Austria Lustenau.

On 12 June 2026, Mikić signed 2-year contract with Bosnian side FK Sarajevo.

== Career statistics ==
=== Club ===
As of match played 22 November 2026

Appearances and goals by club, season and competition
Club	Season	League			National cup (Note: Includes Austrian Cup, Bosnian Cup)		Continental		Total	
Club	Season	Division	Apps	Goals	Apps	Goals	Apps	Goals	Apps	Goals
Kapfenberger SV	2019–20	2. Liga	17	4	2	0	—		19	4
Kapfenberger SV	2020–21	2. Liga	27	5	4	0	—		31	5
Kapfenberger SV	Total		44	9	6	0	—		50	9
SV Ried	2021–22	Austrian Bundesliga	29	5	5	1	—		34	6
SV Ried	2022–23	Austrian Bundesliga	27	2	5	2	—		32	4
SV Ried	Total		56	7	10	3	—		66	10
Jeonnam Dragons	2023	K League 2	9	1	—		—		9	1
Austria Lustenau	2023–24	Austrian Bundesliga	8	1	—		—		8	1
Austria Lustenau	2024–25	Austrian Bundesliga	24	1	3	0	—		27	1
Austria Lustenau	Total		32	2	3	0	—		35	2
Zrinjski Mostar	2025–26	Bosnian Premier League	28	2	6	2	15 (Note: Three appearances in UEFA Champions League; four appearances in UEFA Europa League; eight appearances and one goal in UEFA Conference League)	1	49	5
Sarajevo	2026–27	Bosnian Premier League	8	2	1	0	2 (Note: Appearances in UEFA Conference League)	0	11	2
Career total			177	23	26	4	17	1	220	29

== Honours ==
Zrinjski Mostar

- Bosnian Cup: 2025–26
- Bosnian Supercup: 2025
