= Bartol Barišić =

Croatian footballer

Personal information
- Date of birth: 1 January 2003 (age 23)
- Place of birth: Zagreb, Croatia
- Height: 1.87 m (6 ft 2 in)
- Position: Forward

Team information
- Current team: Sarajevo
- Number: 99

Youth career
- Dinamo Zagreb

Senior career*
Years	Team	Apps	(Gls)
2020–2023	Dinamo Zagreb	1	(0)
2020–2022	Dinamo Zagreb II	33	(10)
2022	→ Istra 1961 (loan)	3	(0)
2022–2023	→ Domžale (loan)	25	(7)
2023–2026	Dunajská Streda	21	(3)
2023–2025	→ Šamorín (loan)	13	(10)
2025–2026	→ Austria Klagenfurt (loan)	26	(9)
2026–	Sarajevo	13	(4)

International career
2017	Croatia U14	2	(1)
2017–2018	Croatia U15	9	(3)
2018–2019	Croatia U16	4	(1)
2019–2020	Croatia U17	9	(10)
2021–2022	Croatia U19	7	(0)
2022	Croatia U20	3	(0)
- * Club domestic league appearances and goals as of 22 November 2026

Bartol Barišić (born 1 January 2003) is a Croatian footballer who plays as a forward for Bosnian Premier League club Sarajevo.

== Club career ==
On 24 July 2020, Barišić played his first match for Dinamo Zagreb, coming on as a substitute for Sandro Kulenović in the 85th minute in a match against Varaždin.

== International career ==
Barišić represented Croatia in all youth selections from under-14 to under-20, amassing 34 appearances for all teams combined.

== Career statistics ==
=== Club ===
As of match played 22 November 2026

Appearances and goals by club, season and competition
Club	Season	League			National cup (Note: Includes Slovenian Cup, Slovak Cup, Austrian Cup, Bosnian Cup)		Continental		Total	
Club	Season	Division	Apps	Goals	Apps	Goals	Apps	Goals	Apps	Goals
Dinamo Zagreb	2019–20	Croatian Football League	1	0	—		—		1	0
Dinamo Zagreb II	2020–21	2. HNL	9	0	—		—		9	0
Dinamo Zagreb II	2021–22	2. HNL	24	10	—		—		24	10
Dinamo Zagreb II	Total		33	10	—		—		33	10
Istra 1961 (loan)	2022–23	Croatian Football League	3	0	—		—		3	0
Domžale (loan)	2022–23	Slovenian PrvaLiga	25	7	2	2	—		27	9
Dunajská Streda	2023–24	Slovak First League	10	2	4	1	—		14	3
Dunajská Streda	2024–25	Slovak First League	11	1	1	0	—		12	1
Dunajská Streda	Total		21	3	5	1	—		26	4
Šamorín (loan)	2023–24	Slovak Second League	4	6	—		—		4	6
Šamorín (loan)	2024–25	Slovak Second League	9	4	—		—		9	4
Šamorín (loan)	Total		13	10	—		—		13	10
Austria Klagenfurt (loan)	2025–26	Austrian Second League	26	9	1	0	—		27	9
Sarajevo	2026–27	Bosnian Premier League	13	4	1	1	2 (Note: Appearances in UEFA Conference League)	1	16	6
Career total			135	43	9	4	2	1	146	48

== Honours ==
Dinamo Zagreb

- Croatian Football League: 2019–20
