= Filip Kosi =

Slovenian footballer (born 2002)

Personal information
- Date of birth: 20 September 2002 (age 24)
- Place of birth: Murska Sobota, Slovenia
- Height: 1.78 m (5 ft 10 in)
- Position: Left-back

Team information
- Current team: Sarajevo
- Number: 17

Youth career
- Mura

Senior career*
| Years | Team | Apps | (Gls) |
| 2019–2021 | Mura | 2 | (0) |
| 2021–2022 | Tabor Sežana | 8 | (0) |
| 2022 | → Drava Ptuj (loan) | 1 | (0) |
| 2022–2023 | Beltinci | 28 | (5) |
| 2023–2026 | Aluminij | 76 | (3) |
| 2026– | Sarajevo | 9 | (0) |
- * Club domestic league appearances and goals as of 11 October 2026

Filip Kosi (born 20 September 2002) is a Slovenian professional footballer who plays as a left-back for Bosnian Premier League club Sarajevo.

== Career ==
Kosi began his career with Mura, with whom he won the Slovenian PrvaLiga title in the 2020–21 season. He subsequently moved to Tabor Sežana, from where he was loaned to Drava in February 2022 before returning to Tabor Sežana at the end of the loan spell in June 2022.

On 8 July 2022, Kosi joined Beltinci, before transferring to Aluminij on 30 June 2023. Over three seasons with Aluminij, he won the Slovenian Football Cup and the Slovenian Second League title, and made 29 appearances, scoring one goal and providing three assists, in his final season with the club.

On 1 June 2026, Kosi signed for Bosnian club FK Sarajevo as a free agent, agreeing a contract until 30 June 2029. He made his debut on 9 July 2026 in a UEFA Conference League match against Inter Turku.

== Career statistics ==
=== Club ===
As of match played 27 October 2026

Appearances and goals by club, season and competition
| Club | Season | League | | | National cup (Note: Includes Slovenian Cup, Bosnian Cup) | | Continental | | Total | |
| Club | Season | Division | Apps | Goals | Apps | Goals | Apps | Goals | Apps | Goals |
|---|---|---|---|---|---|---|---|---|---|---|
| Mura | 2020–21 | Slovenian PrvaLiga | 2 | 0 | — | | — | | 2 | 0 |
| Tabor Sežana | 2021–22 | Slovenian PrvaLiga | 8 | 0 | — | | — | | 8 | 0 |
| Drava Ptuj (loan) | 2021–22 | Slovenian Second League | 1 | 0 | — | | — | | 1 | 0 |
| Beltinci | 2022–23 | Slovenian Second League | 28 | 5 | — | | — | | 28 | 5 |
| Aluminij | 2023–24 | Slovenian PrvaLiga | 24 | 0 | — | | — | | 24 | 0 |
| Aluminij | 2024–25 | Slovenian Second League | 27 | 3 | 2 | 1 | — | | 29 | 4 |
| Aluminij | 2025–26 | Slovenian PrvaLiga | 25 | 0 | 4 | 1 | — | | 29 | 1 |
| Aluminij | Total | | 76 | 3 | 6 | 2 | — | | 82 | 5 |
| Sarajevo | 2026–27 | Bosnian Premier League | 9 | 0 | 1 | 0 | 1 (Note: Appearance in UEFA Conference League) | 0 | 11 | 0 |
| Career total | | | 124 | 8 | 7 | 2 | 1 | 0 | 132 | 10 |

== Honours ==
Mura

- Slovenian PrvaLiga: 2020–21

Aluminij

- Slovenian Cup: 2025–26
- Slovenian Second League: 2024–25
