= Luka Dajčer =

Croatian footballer (born 2001)

Personal information
- Date of birth: 6 June 2001 (age 25)
- Place of birth: Zagreb, Croatia
- Height: 1.84 m (6 ft 0 in)
- Position: Left-back

Team information
- Current team: Sarajevo
- Number: 30

Youth career
- –2016: Trnje
- 2016–2020: Lokomotiva Zagreb

Senior career*
Years	Team	Apps	(Gls)
2020–2022	Lokomotiva Zagreb	0	(0)
2020	→ Rudeš (loan)	7	(0)
2021	→ Inter Zaprešić (loan)	17	(0)
2022	→ Jarun Zagreb (loan)	12	(0)
2022–2024	Jarun Zagreb	54	(4)
2024–2026	Lokomotiva Zagreb	47	(1)
2026–	Sarajevo	10	(0)
- * Club domestic league appearances and goals as of 24 October 2026

Luka Dajčer (born 6 June 2001) is a Croatian professional footballer who plays as a left-back for Bosnian Premier League club Sarajevo.

== Club career ==
=== Early career and Jarun ===
Born in Zagreb, Dajčer played youth football for Trnje before joining the youth system of Lokomotiva Zagreb in 2016.

After progressing to senior football, he spent periods on loan in Croatia's second tier with Rudeš and Inter Zaprešić. In January 2022, he joined Jarun on a six-month loan from Lokomotiva. After the loan, he did not agree a new contract with Lokomotiva and remained with Jarun on a permanent basis.

Dajčer established himself as a regular at Jarun during the following two seasons. In the 2023–24 season, he scored twice in 28 league appearances. A May 2024 profile in Sportske novosti described him as one of Jarun's leading players and noted his versatility, left foot, aerial ability and capacity to play at centre-back, full-back or as a defensive midfielder.

=== Lokomotiva Zagreb ===
Dajčer returned to Lokomotiva in the summer of 2024 and made his Croatian Football League debut during the 2024–25 season. He gradually established himself in the first team, appearing both in central defence and at left-back. He made 24 league appearances and scored once during his first top-flight season, as well as making three appearances in the Croatian Football Cup.

By April 2025, Dajčer had become a regular member of the Lokomotiva defence. Following a 1–1 league draw away to Hajduk Split, Sportske novosti highlighted his performance while marking Marko Livaja, with Dajčer playing between centre-back and full-back during the match. He finished the 2025–26 season with 23 league appearances and two Croatian Cup appearances.

=== Sarajevo ===
On 2 July 2026, Dajčer joined Bosnian club Sarajevo. He signed a contract until 31 May 2028, with the club holding an option to extend the agreement for a further season.

During the opening weeks of his first season with the club, Dajčer also made his first appearance in UEFA club competition, playing in Sarajevo's UEFA Conference League qualifying campaign.

== Style of play ==
A left-footed defender, Dajčer has primarily been used as a centre-back and left-back. During his time at Jarun he was also deployed as a defensive midfielder, while later reports noted that he was capable of filling in at right-back. Sportske novosti highlighted his passing over distance, aerial ability and versatility as notable aspects of his game.

== Career statistics ==
As of match played 24 October 2026

Appearances and goals by club, season and competition
Club	Season	League			National cup (Note: Includes Croatian Cup)		Continental		Total	
Club	Season	Division	Apps	Goals	Apps	Goals	Apps	Goals	Apps	Goals
Rudeš (loan)	2020–21	2. HNL	7	0	1	0	—		8	0
Inter Zaprešić (loan)	2020–21	2. HNL	17	0	—		—		17	0
Jarun Zagreb (loan)	2021–22	2. HNL	12	0	—		—		12	0
Jarun Zagreb	2022–23	1. NL	26	2	—		—		26	2
Jarun Zagreb	2023–24	1. NL	28	2	—		—		28	2
Jarun Zagreb	Total		66	4	—		—		66	4
Lokomotiva Zagreb	2024–25	Croatian Football League	24	1	3	0	—		27	1
Lokomotiva Zagreb	2025–26	Croatian Football League	23	0	2	0	—		25	0
Lokomotiva Zagreb	Total		47	1	5	0	—		52	1
Sarajevo	2026–27	Bosnian Premier League	10	0	0	0	1 (Note: Appearance in UEFA Conference League)	0	11	0
Career total			147	5	6	0	1	0	154	5
