= Sandro Jovanović =

Slovenian footballer (born 2002)

Personal information
- Date of birth: 23 April 2002 (age 24)
- Height: 1.82 m (6 ft 0 in)
- Positions: Left-back; winger

Team information
- Current team: Željezničar
- Number: 32

Youth career
- Rudar Velenje

Senior career*
| Years | Team | Apps | (Gls) |
| 2020–2023 | Rudar Velenje | 80 | (13) |
| 2023–2024 | Aluminij | 32 | (5) |
| 2024–2026 | Koper | 37 | (0) |
| 2026 | → Primorje (loan) | 14 | (2) |
| 2026– | Željezničar | 5 | (0) |

International career
| 2023–2025 | Slovenia U21 | 4 | (0) |
- * Club domestic league appearances and goals as of 21 November 2026

Sandro Jovanović (born 23 April 2002) is a Slovenian professional footballer who plays as a left-back for Bosnian Premier League club Željezničar. He represented Slovenia at youth international level with the under-21 team.

== Career statistics ==
As of match played 21 November 2026

Appearances and goals by club, season and competition
| Club | Season | League | | | National cup (Note: Includes Slovenian Cup, Bosnian Cup) | | Continental | | Other | | Total | |
| Club | Season | Division | Apps | Goals | Apps | Goals | Apps | Goals | Apps | Goals | Apps | Goals |
|---|---|---|---|---|---|---|---|---|---|---|---|---|
| Rudar Velenje | 2019–20 | Slovenian PrvaLiga | 10 | 1 | — | | — | | — | | 10 | 1 |
| Rudar Velenje | 2020–21 | Slovenian Second League | 18 | 3 | 2 | 1 | — | | 1 (Note: Appearance in MNZ Celje Cup) | 2 | 21 | 6 |
| Rudar Velenje | 2021–22 | Slovenian Second League | 27 | 4 | — | | — | | — | | 27 | 4 |
| Rudar Velenje | 2022–23 | Slovenian Second League | 25 | 5 | 4 | 2 | — | | — | | 29 | 7 |
| Rudar Velenje | Total | | 80 | 13 | 6 | 3 | — | | 1 | 2 | 87 | 18 |
| Aluminij | 2023–24 | Slovenian PrvaLiga | 32 | 5 | 1 | 0 | — | | — | | 33 | 5 |
| Koper | 2024–25 | Slovenian PrvaLiga | 28 | 0 | 6 | 1 | — | | — | | 34 | 1 |
| Koper | 2025–26 | Slovenian PrvaLiga | 9 | 0 | — | | 4 (Note: Appearances in UEFA Conference League) | 0 | — | | 13 | 0 |
| Koper | Total | | 37 | 0 | 6 | 1 | 4 | 0 | — | | 47 | 1 |
| Primorje (loan) | 2025–26 | Slovenian PrvaLiga | 14 | 2 | — | | — | | 2 (Note: Appearances in Slovenian PrvaLiga promotion/relegation play-off) | 0 | 16 | 2 |
| Željezničar | 2026–27 | Bosnian Premier League | 5 | 0 | 1 | 0 | — | | — | | 6 | 0 |
| Career total | | | 168 | 20 | 14 | 4 | 4 | 0 | 3 | 2 | 189 | 26 |
