= David Muslera Rodríguez =

Spanish football manager (born 1986)

Personal information
- Full name: David Muslera Rodríguez
- Date of birth: 26 April 1986 (age 40)
- Place of birth: Madrid, Spain

Managerial career
- Years: Team
- 2024: Ekranas
- 2024–2026: Baltijos FA
- 2026: Jonava
- 2026: Željezničar

David Muslera Rodríguez (born 26 April 1986) is a Spanish professional football manager.

== Career ==
=== Early career ===
Born in Madrid, Spain on 26 April 1986, Muslera started his managerial career at the age of 18 as a youth coach at hometown club Atlético Madrid in 2004. He subsequently worked in the youth teams of Leganés and Getafe among others.

After working in the youth side of Lithuanian club Be1, Muslera was appointed manager of Ekranas in April 2024, his first experience as a head coach. He then signed with Baltijos FA in December 2024. On 4 July 2026, he was named manager of another I Lyga outfit Jonava.

=== Željezničar ===
Just ten days after joining Jonava, Muslera left the club after reaching an agreement with Bosnian Premier League club Željezničar on 14 July, which paid an undisclosed release clause. In his first competitive game in charge, Željezničar defeated BSK Banja Luka in the opening game of the season on 7 August 2026. Muslera suffered his first defeat as Željezničar manager on 23 August, following a 2–0 away loss to Zrinjski Mostar. After defeating Velež Mostar 3–1 at home on 6 September, he also won his first Sarajevo derby three days later, managing a 2–0 win over rivals FK Sarajevo.

However, Željezničar then embarked on an eight-game winless run in the league, which culminated in a 4–0 home defeat to Borac Banja Luka on 21 November 2026. Instantly after the game, the club announced Muslera's departure, with immediate effect.

== Managerial statistics ==
As of match played 21 November 2026

Managerial record by team and tenure
Team	From	To	Record							
Team	From	To	G	W	D	L	GF	GA	GD	Win %
Ekranas	29 April 2024	10 December 2024	24	10	5	9	34	35	−1	41.67
Baltijos FA	11 December 2024	3 July 2026	50	26	8	16	76	67	+9	52.00
Jonava	4 July 2026	13 July 2026	0	0	0	0	0	0	+0	—
Željezničar	14 July 2026	21 November 2026	15	4	4	7	14	25	−11	26.67
Total			89	40	17	32	124	127	−3	44.94
