= Aleksa Pejić =

Serbian footballer (born 1999)

Personal information
- Date of birth: 9 July 1999 (age 27)
- Place of birth: Belgrade, FR Yugoslavia
- Height: 1.90 m (6 ft 3 in)
- Position: Defensive midfielder

Team information
- Current team: Željezničar
- Number: 6

Youth career
- –2017: Brodarac

Senior career*
Years	Team	Apps	(Gls)
2017–2019	Brodarac		
2019–2021	Proleter Novi Sad	59	(3)
2021–2022	Shakhtyor Soligorsk	16	(1)
2022–2024	Rapid Wien	26	(0)
2023	Rapid Wien II	1	(0)
2024–2025	TSC	37	(2)
2025–2026	Maccabi Bnei Reineh	17	(0)
2026–	Željezničar	28	(2)

International career
2021	Serbia	2	(0)
- * Club domestic league appearances and goals as of 21 November 2026

Aleksa Pejić (Serbian Cyrillic: Алекса Пејић; born 9 July 1999) is a Serbian professional footballer who plays as a defensive midfielder for and captains Bosnian Premier League club Željezničar.

== Club career ==
Pejić joined Austrian side Rapid Wien in June 2022. On 9 February 2024, he signed with Serbian SuperLiga club TSC.

On 29 January 2026, Pejić joined Bosnian Premier League side Željezničar on a two-and-a-half-year deal. He debuted in a league game against Rudar Prijedor on 16 February 2026. Pejić was made the team captain ahead of the 2026–27 season. He scored his first goal for Željezničar in a 3–1 home win over Velež Mostar on 6 September 2026.

== International career ==
Pejić made his senior international debut for Serbia during a January 2021 Latin America tour against the Dominican Republic, and also played against Panama.

== Career statistics ==
As of match played 21 November 2026

Appearances and goals by club, season and competition
Club	Season	League			National cup (Note: Includes Serbian Cup, Belarusian Cup, Austrian Cup, Israel State Cup, Bosnian Cup)		Continental		Other		Total	
Club	Season	Division	Apps	Goals	Apps	Goals	Apps	Goals	Apps	Goals	Apps	Goals
Proleter Novi Sad	2019–20	Serbian SuperLiga	26	2	1	0	—		—		27	2
Proleter Novi Sad	2020–21	Serbian SuperLiga	33	1	2	0	—		—		35	1
Proleter Novi Sad	Total		59	3	3	0	—		—		62	3
Shakhtyor Soligorsk	2021	Belarusian Premier League	11	1	—		—		—		11	1
Shakhtyor Soligorsk	2022	Belarusian Premier League	5	0	1	0	1 (Note: Appearance in UEFA Europa Conference League)	0	1 (Note: Appearance in the Belarusian Super Cup)	0	8	0
Shakhtyor Soligorsk	Total		16	1	1	0	1	0	1	0	19	1
Rapid Wien	2022–23	Austrian Bundesliga	26	0	5	0	5	0	—		36	0
Rapid Wien II	2023–24	Regionalliga East	1	0	—		—		—		1	0
TSC	2023–24	Serbian SuperLiga	12	1	—		—		—		12	1
TSC	2024–25	Serbian SuperLiga	25	1	2	0	8 (Note: Two appearances in UEFA Europa League, six appearances in UEFA Conference League)	0	—		35	1
TSC	Total		37	2	2	0	8	0	—		47	2
Maccabi Bnei Reineh	2025–26	Israeli Premier League	17	0	1	0	—		—		18	0
Željezničar	2025–26	Bosnian Premier League	15	0	2	0	—		—		17	0
Željezničar	2026–27	Bosnian Premier League	13	2	1	1	—		—		14	3
Željezničar	Total		28	2	3	1	—		—		31	3
Career total			184	8	15	1	14	0	1	0	214	9

== Honours ==
Shakhtyor Soligorsk

- Belarusian Premier League: 2021
