= Prnjavor Veliki =

Prnjavor Veliki Прњавор Велики
- Village
- Location within Bosnia and Herzegovina
- Coordinates: 44°49′25″N 17°58′16″E
- Country: Bosnia and Herzegovina
- Entity: Republika Srpska
- Municipality: Doboj
- Time zone: UTC+1 (CET)
  - Summer (DST): UTC+2 (CEST)

Prnjavor Veliki (Cyrillic: Прњавор Велики) is a village in the municipality of Doboj, Bosnia and Herzegovina.
