= Prnjavor, Gornji Milanovac =

Prnjavor Прњавор
- Village
- Location within Serbia
- Coordinates: 44°03′N 20°36′E
- Country: Serbia
- District: Moravica District
- Municipality: Gornji Milanovac

Population (2002)
  - Total: 107
- Time zone: UTC+1 (CET)
  - Summer (DST): UTC+2 (CEST)

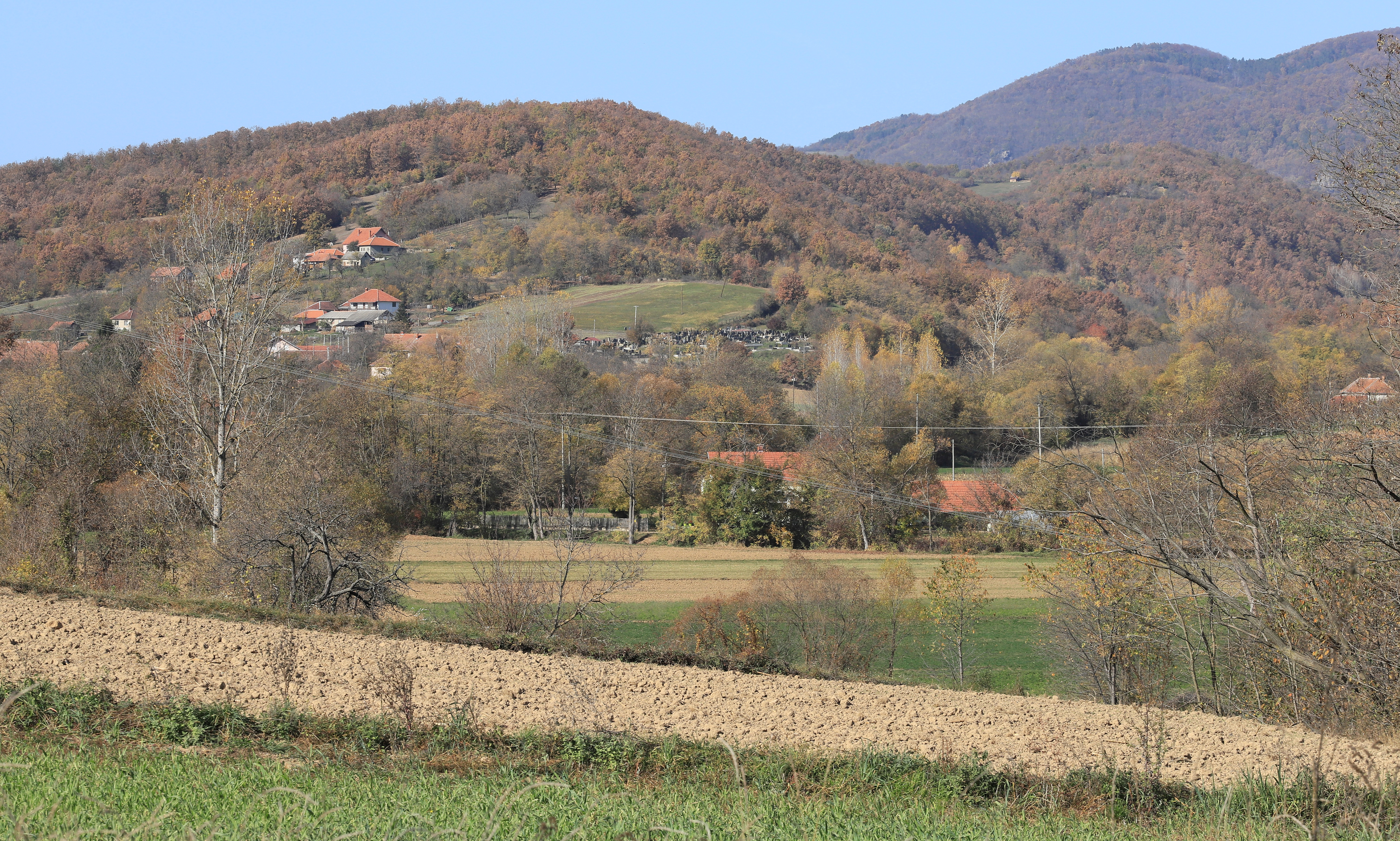
Village of Prnjavor (Gornji Milanovac Municipality), Serbia

Prnjavor is a village in the municipality of Gornji Milanovac, Serbia. According to the 2002 census, the village has a population of 107 people.
