= Ricardo Caraballo =

Colombian footballer (born 2004)

Personal information
- Full name: Ricardo Andrés Caraballo Florez
- Date of birth: 9 February 2004 (age 22)
- Place of birth: Soledad, Barranquilla, Colombia
- Height: 1.83 m (6 ft 0 in)
- Position: Forward

Team information
- Current team: Sarajevo
- Number: 19

Youth career
- 2011–2017: Cambiando Vidas
- 2018–2020: Barranquilla

Senior career*
| Years | Team | Apps | (Gls) |
| 2020–2024 | Barranquilla | 67 | (11) |
| 2024–2026 | Al-Ittihad | 0 | (0) |
| 2024–2025 | → Jeddah (loan) | 22 | (4) |
| 2025–2026 | → Al-Anwar (loan) | 31 | (10) |
| 2026– | Sarajevo | 9 | (2) |

International career
| 2019 | Colombia U16 | 7 | (7) |
| 2022–2023 | Colombia U20 | 14 | (3) |
| 2023 | Colombia U23 | 1 | (0) |
- * Club domestic league appearances and goals as of 24 October 2026

Ricardo Andrés Caraballo Florez (born 9 February 2004) is a Colombian footballer who currently plays as a forward for Bosnian Premier League club Sarajevo.

== Club career ==
Born in Soledad in the Metropolitan area of Barranquilla, Caraballo began his career with local side Club Deportivo Cambiando Vidas, where his performances earned him a call-up to the Atlántico Department's representative team, as well as the Colombian under-15 side. Following good performances at the 2019 South American U-15 Championship, at which he finished top scorer with seven goals, he attracted offers from teams in Brazil, but would remain in his native Colombia with the academy of Barranquilla, whom he had joined the year prior.

Throughout his progression in the Barranquilla academy, he was consistently their top scorer in competitions. On 17 September 2020, he marked his debut for Barranquilla with a goal; having come on as a half-time substitute for José Martínez, he needed only two minutes to score his first professional goal, scoring with a half-volley shot.

On 8 September 2024, Caraballo signed to Al Ittihad, and was loaned to Jeddah. On 21 August 2025, Caraballo joined Al-Anwar on a one-year loan.

== International career ==
Having represented Colombia at under-15 and under-17 levels, Caraballo began to establish himself in the under-20 squad in 2022, scoring twice in six appearances in friendlies. He was called up for the 2023 South American U-20 Championship, but in Colombia's third game, a 1–1 draw with Brazil, he was heavily criticised by fans and media alike for his performance, in which he missed an open goal. Following the criticism, his former coach at Atlántico, as well as the assistant coach of Colombia's under-15s, came to his defence, with the president of Barranquilla, Ernesto Herrera, stated that he would have the full support of the club.

Caraballo's performances, however, did not significantly improve, and he was singled out again by fans for his performances in the matches against Argentina and Uruguay. He had started in each game, as well as Colombia's first match, a 1–1 draw with Paraguay, but had been substituted off in each one. Following the tournament, having scored no goals in six games, Caraballo revealed that he visited a psychologist to help him deal with the criticism and abuse.

== Career statistics ==
=== Club ===
As of match played 24 October 2026

Appearances and goals by club, season and competition
| Club | Season | League | | | National cup (Note: Includes Copa Colombia, King's Cup) | | Total | |
| Club | Season | Division | Apps | Goals | Apps | Goals | Apps | Goals |
|---|---|---|---|---|---|---|---|---|
| Barranquilla | 2020 | Categoría Primera B | 4 | 1 | 0 | 0 | 4 | 1 |
| Barranquilla | 2021 | Categoría Primera B | 11 | 1 | 2 | 0 | 13 | 1 |
| Barranquilla | 2022 | Categoría Primera B | 13 | 2 | 0 | 0 | 13 | 2 |
| Barranquilla | 2023 | Categoría Primera B | 27 | 6 | 2 | 0 | 29 | 6 |
| Barranquilla | 2024 | Categoría Primera B | 12 | 1 | 1 | 0 | 13 | 1 |
| Barranquilla | Total | | 67 | 11 | 5 | 0 | 72 | 11 |
| Jeddah (loan) | 2024–25 | Saudi First Division League | 22 | 4 | 1 | 0 | 23 | 4 |
| Al-Anwar (loan) | 2025–26 | Saudi First Division League | 31 | 10 | 1 | 0 | 23 | 4 |
| Sarajevo | 2026–27 | Bosnian Premier League | 9 | 2 | 0 | 0 | 9 | 2 |
| Career total | | | 131 | 41 | 8 | 3 | 139 | 44 |
