= Prnjavor, Vitez =

Prnjavor
- Village
- Location within Bosnia and Herzegovina
- Coordinates: 44.1597183°N 17.8397907°E
- Country: Bosnia and Herzegovina
- Entity: Federation of Bosnia and Herzegovina
- Canton: Central Bosnia
- Municipality: Vitez

Area
  - Total: 0.49 sq mi (1.26 km^{2})

Population (2013)
  - Total: 287
  - Density: 590/sq mi (228/km^{2})
- Time zone: UTC+1 (CET)
  - Summer (DST): UTC+2 (CEST)

Prnjavor is a village in the municipality of Vitez, Bosnia and Herzegovina.

== Demographics ==
According to the 2013 census, its population was 287.

Ethnicity in 2013
Ethnicity	Number	Percentage
Bosniaks	286	99.7%
other/undeclared	1	0.3%
Total	287	100%
