= Prnjavor, Bihać =

Prnjavor
- Village
- Location within Bosnia and Herzegovina
- Coordinates: 44.8790°N 15.7770°E
- Country: Bosnia and Herzegovina
- Entity: Federation of Bosnia and Herzegovina
- Canton: Una-Sana
- Municipality: Bihać

Area
  - Total: 1.34 sq mi (3.47 km^{2})

Population (2013)
  - Total: 350
  - Density: 260/sq mi (100/km^{2})
- Time zone: UTC+1 (CET)
  - Summer (DST): UTC+2 (CEST)

Prnjavor is a village in the municipality of Bihać, Bosnia and Herzegovina. It is located close to the Croatian border.

== Demographics ==
According to the 2013 census, its population was 350.

Ethnicity in 2013
Ethnicity	Number	Percentage
Bosniaks	329	94.0%
Croats	2	0.6%
other/undeclared	19	5.4%
Total	350	100%
