= Filip Antovski =

Macedonian footballer

Personal information
- Date of birth: 24 November 2000 (age 25)
- Place of birth: Kumanovo, Macedonia
- Height: 1.75 m (5 ft 9 in)
- Position: Left back

Team information
- Current team: AP Brera Strumica
- Number: 21

Youth career
- 2016–2018: Vardar

Senior career*
Years	Team	Apps	(Gls)
2018–2019	Vardar	7	(0)
2019–2021	Dinamo Zagreb II	14	(0)
2020–2021	→ Slavia Sofia (loan)	24	(0)
2021–2022	Austria Wien	0	(0)
2021	Young Violets	16	(0)
2022	→ Istra 1961 (loan)	10	(0)
2023–2024	Karviná	15	(0)
2024–	AP Brera Strumica	44	(1)

International career^{‡}
2016	Macedonia U17	3	(0)
2017–2018	Macedonia U18	4	(0)
2016–2018	Macedonia U19	10	(0)
2019–2022	Macedonia U21	23	(0)
- * Club domestic league appearances and goals as of 25 May 2026 ‡ National team caps and goals as of 30 March 2022

Filip Antovski (Macedonian: Филип Антовски; born 24 November 2000) is a Macedonian footballer who plays as a left back for AP Brera Strumica.

== Club career ==
Antovski started his professional career at the age of 17 by making his First Macedonian Football League debut for Vardar in April 2018. He played the full 90 minutes on his debut and also picked up an assist. In February 2019 he made his first professional transfer abroad, by signing for Croatian side Dinamo Zagreb where he was set to play for their second team, performing in Croatian Second Football League. After 18 months performing for Dinamo II, Filip got sent out on a loan to Bulgarian side Slavia Sofia to play in the Bulgarian top division. On 18 October 2020 he also made his league debut for Slavia, in the 1–0 win against Levski Sofia.

On 2 July 2021 he moved to Austria Wien in Austria.

== International career ==
Antovski made his international debut for North Macedonia U21 on 22 March 2019 in the friendly match against Ukraine where he found himself in the starting lineup and played for 73 minutes. The match was played on a neutral field in Turkey and it ended in a 3–1 loss for Macedonia. Previously he also had numerous appearances for the U19, U18 and U17 national teams as well.
