= Prince Mumba (footballer) =

Zambian footballer (born 2001)

Personal information
- Date of birth: 24 March 2001 (age 25)
- Place of birth: Solwezi, Zambia
- Position: Midfielder

Team information
- Current team: Power Dynamos

Senior career*
Years	Team	Apps	(Gls)
2020–2022	Kabwe Warriors		
2022–2023	Istra 1961	9	(0)
2023–2024	Kabwe Warriors		
2024-	Power Dynamos		(1)

International career^{‡}
2021–	Zambia	12	(1)
- * Club domestic league appearances and goals ‡ National team caps and goals as of 17 June 2026

Prince Mumba (born 24 March 2001) is a Zambian professional footballer who plays as a midfielder for Power Dynamos and the Zambia national team.

Mumba was named the player of the tournament at the 2020 COSAFA U-20 Cup despite Zambia placing fourth.

Mumba made his international debut on 5 June 2021 in a 3–1 friendly defeat against Senegal.

On 3 September 2021, Mumba scored his first goal for Zambia in a 2022 FIFA World Cup qualifier against Mauritania, which they won 2–1.

== International career ==
=== International goals ===
Scores and results list Zambia's goal tally first.

No.	Date	Venue	Opponent	Score	Result	Competition
1.	3 September 2021	Stade Olympique, Nouakchott, Mauritania	Mauritania	1–0	2–1	2022 FIFA World Cup qualification
