= Antonio Galešić =

Croatian footballer (born 2003)

Personal information
- Date of birth: 15 April 2003 (age 23)
- Place of birth: Zadar, Croatia
- Height: 1.85 m (6 ft 1 in)
- Position: Defensive midfielder

Team information
- Current team: Sarajevo
- Number: 8

Youth career
- –2020: Zadar
- 2020–2022: Rijeka

Senior career*
Years	Team	Apps	(Gls)
2022–2024	Rijeka	0	(0)
2022–2024	Grobničan	46	(5)
2024–2026	Orijent	76	(5)
2026–	Sarajevo	7	(1)
- * Club domestic league appearances and goals as of 22 November 2026

Antonio Galešić (born 15 April 2003) is a Croatian professional footballer who plays as a defensive midfielder for Bosnian Premier League club Sarajevo.

== Club career ==
=== Early career ===
Born in Zadar, Galešić began playing football with hometown club Zadar before joining the youth academy of Rijeka in 2020.

In August 2022, Rijeka sent him on loan to Grobničan, where he began his senior career. He spent the following season and a half with Grobničan before moving to Orijent during the 2023–24 season. Galešić did not make a first-team appearance for Rijeka.

=== Orijent ===
After initially joining Orijent while still a Rijeka player, Galešić subsequently left Rijeka and continued with Orijent on a permanent basis.

He established himself as a regular in the Croatian second tier, making 61 league appearances and scoring five goals across the 2024–25 and 2025–26 seasons. During his final season at the club, Galešić was a regular member of the Orijent midfield.

=== Sarajevo ===
In June 2026, Galešić joined Bosnian club Sarajevo on a free transfer, signing a three-year contract.

== Career statistics ==
As of match played 22 November 2026

Appearances and goals by club, season and competition
Club	Season	League			National cup (Note: Includes Croatian Cup, Bosnian Cup)		Continental		Other		Total	
Club	Season	Division	Apps	Goals	Apps	Goals	Apps	Goals	Apps	Goals	Apps	Goals
Grobničan	2022–23	2. NL	33	5	2	1	—		—		35	6
Grobničan	2023–24	2. NL	13	0	2	2	—		—		15	2
Grobničan	Total		46	5	4	3	—		—		50	8
Orijent	2023–24	1. NL	15	0	—		—		1 (Note: Appearance in the 2023–24 First Football League relegation play-offs)	0	16	0
Orijent	2024–25	1. NL	30	4	1	0	—		—		31	4
Orijent	2025–26	1. NL	31	1	—		—		—		31	1
Orijent	Total		76	5	1	0	—		1	0	78	5
Sarajevo	2026–27	Bosnian Premier League	7	1	1	0	1 (Note: Appearance in UEFA Conference League)	0	—		9	1
Career total			129	11	6	3	1	0	1	0	137	14
