= Marko Karamarko =

German footballer (born 1993)

Personal information
- Date of birth: 27 March 1993 (age 33)
- Place of birth: Witten, Germany
- Height: 1.80 m (5 ft 11 in)
- Position: Right-back

Team information
- Current team: Željezničar
- Number: 30

Senior career*
| Years | Team | Apps | (Gls) |
| 2012 | Preußen Münster | 0 | (0) |
| 2023 | Sportfreunde Lotte | 3 | (0) |
| 2013–2014 | Wattenscheid 09 | 6 | (0) |
| 2014–2015 | Patro Eisden Maasmechelen | 13 | (0) |
| 2015–2016 | Wegberg-Beeck | 30 | (0) |
| 2016–2017 | Sesvete | 25 | (0) |
| 2017–2018 | Cibalia | 32 | (2) |
| 2018–2020 | Slaven Belupo | 27 | (0) |
| 2020–2021 | Žalgiris | 37 | (2) |
| 2022 | Croatia Zmijavci | 6 | (1) |
| 2023 | Velež Mostar | 3 | (0) |
| 2023–2024 | Dubočica | 4 | (0) |
| 2024 | Triglav Kranj | 11 | (1) |
| 2025 | Zrinski Osječko | 10 | (0) |
| 2025–2026 | Riteriai | 33 | (1) |
| 2026– | Željezničar | 11 | (0) |
- * Club domestic league appearances and goals as of 21 November 2026

Marko Karamarko (born 27 March 1993) is a German professional footballer who plays as a right-back for Bosnian Premier League club Željezničar.

== Career ==
At the age of 5, Karamarko joined the youth academy of Schalke 04 in the Bundesliga.

In 2014, Karamarko signed with Belgian Second Division side Patro Eisden Maasmechelen after stints in the German lower leagues playing for Preußen Münster, Sportfreunde Lotte, and Wattenscheid 09. In 2017, he joined Croatian First League outfit Cibalia, scoring both his first goals as a professional footballer in a 5–2 loss to Dinamo Zagreb. In 2020, Karamarko signed with Žalgiris, Lithuania's most successful club. After winning two league titles with the side, he left Žalgiris and returned to Croatia, joining Croatia Zmijavci. He then played for Velež Mostar, Dubočica, Triglav Kranj, Zrinski Osječko and Riteriai.

On 3 August 2026, Karamarko signed a one-year contract with Bosnian Premier League club Željezničar. He debuted in a 1–1 home draw against Široki Brijeg on 29 August.

== Career statistics ==
As of match played 21 November 2026

Appearances and goals by club, season and competition
| Club | Season | League | | | National cup (Note: Includes Croatian Cup, Lithuanian Cup, Bosnian Cup, Slovenian Cup) | | Continental | | Other | | Total | |
| Club | Season | Division | Apps | Goals | Apps | Goals | Apps | Goals | Apps | Goals | Apps | Goals |
|---|---|---|---|---|---|---|---|---|---|---|---|---|
| Sportfreunde Lotte | 2012–13 | Regionalliga West | 3 | 0 | — | | — | | 1 (Note: Appearance in the Westphalian Cup) | 0 | 4 | 0 |
| Wattenscheid 09 | 2013–14 | Regionalliga West | 6 | 0 | — | | — | | — | | 6 | 0 |
| Patro Eisden | 2014–15 | Belgian Second Division | 13 | 0 | — | | — | | — | | 13 | 0 |
| Wegberg-Beeck | 2015–16 | Regionalliga West | 30 | 0 | — | | — | | 1 (Note: Appearance in the Middle Rhine Cup) | 0 | 31 | 0 |
| Sesvete (loan) | 2016–17 | Croatian Second League | 25 | 0 | — | | — | | — | | 25 | 0 |
| Cibalia | 2017–18 | Croatian First League | 32 | 2 | 2 | 0 | — | | — | | 34 | 2 |
| Slaven Belupo | 2018–19 | Croatian First League | 22 | 0 | 2 | 0 | — | | — | | 24 | 0 |
| Slaven Belupo | 2019–20 | Croatian First League | 5 | 0 | — | | — | | — | | 5 | 0 |
| Slaven Belupo | Total | | 27 | 0 | 2 | 0 | — | | — | | 29 | 0 |
| Žalgiris | 2020 | A Lyga | 18 | 2 | 3 | 0 | 1 (Note: Appearance in UEFA Europa League) | 0 | 1 (Note: Appearance in the Lithuanian Supercup) | 0 | 23 | 2 |
| Žalgiris | 2021 | A Lyga | 19 | 0 | 1 | 0 | 3 (Note: Appearances in UEFA Champions League) | 0 | 1 | 0 | 24 | 0 |
| Žalgiris | Total | | 37 | 2 | 4 | 0 | 4 | 0 | 2 | 0 | 47 | 2 |
| Croatia Zmijavci | 2022–23 | Croatian First League | 6 | 1 | — | | — | | — | | 6 | 1 |
| Velež Mostar | 2022–23 | Bosnian Premier League | 3 | 0 | 1 | 0 | — | | — | | 4 | 0 |
| Dubočica | 2023–24 | Serbian First League | 4 | 0 | — | | — | | — | | 4 | 0 |
| Triglav Kranj | 2023–24 | Slovenian Second League | 11 | 1 | 1 | 0 | — | | — | | 12 | 1 |
| Zrinski Osječko | 2024–25 | Croatian First League | 10 | 0 | — | | — | | — | | 10 | 0 |
| Riteriai | 2025 | A Lyga | 15 | 0 | — | | — | | 2 (Note: Appearances in the 2025 A Lyga play-off) | 0 | 17 | 0 |
| Riteriai | 2026 | A Lyga | 18 | 1 | 2 | 1 | — | | — | | 20 | 2 |
| Riteriai | Total | | 33 | 1 | 2 | 1 | — | | 2 | 0 | 37 | 2 |
| Željezničar | 2026–27 | Bosnian Premier League | 11 | 0 | 1 | 0 | — | | — | | 12 | 0 |
| Career total | | | 251 | 7 | 13 | 1 | 4 | 0 | 6 | 0 | 274 | 8 |

== Honours ==
Žalgiris

- A Lyga: 2020, 2021
- Lithuanian Cup: 2021
- Lithuanian Supercup: 2020
