= Joseph Amoah (footballer, born 2002) =

Ghanaian footballer (born 2002)

Personal information
- Date of birth: 1 January 2002 (age 24)
- Place of birth: Accra, Ghana
- Height: 1.78 m (5 ft 10 in)
- Position: Winger

Team information
- Current team: Al Jazirah Al-Hamra
- Number: 26

Youth career
- Accra Lions

Senior career*
Years	Team	Apps	(Gls)
2020	Trenčín	0	(0)
2021–2022	Rudar Prijedor	38	(10)
2022–2024	Željezničar	54	(8)
2024–	Al Jazirah Al-Hamra	0	(0)
- * Club domestic league appearances and goals as of 3 May 2024

Joseph Amoah (born 1 January 2002) is a Ghanaian professional footballer who plays for Al Jazirah Al-Hamra as a winger.

== Career ==
=== Rudar Prijedor ===
In February 2021, Amoah signed with Bosnian club Rudar Prijedor. He made his debut in a 1–0 loss to Modriča on 28 March 2021. He left the club in July 2022.

=== Željezničar ===
On 8 August 2022, Amoah joined Bosnian Premier League club Željezničar on a two-year deal. He made his debut in a 2–1 defeat against Borac Banja Luka on 20 August. He scored his first goal for the club in a home win against Igman Konjic on 5 September 2022. Amoah finished the season as Željezničar's top scorer in the league alongside Clarismario Santos, as the side finished in third and secured a UEFA Europa Conference League first qualifying round spot.

Following the end of the 2023–24 season, Amoah left Željezničar in July 2024 after negotiations to renew his contract with the club had failed.

== Career statistics ==
=== Club ===
As of match played 3 May 2024

Appearances and goals by club, season and competition
Club	Season	League	League		Cup		Europe		Total	
Club	Season	League	Apps	Goals	Apps	Goals	Apps	Goals	Apps	Goals
Rudar Prijedor	2020–21	First League of RS	11	3	–		–		11	3
Rudar Prijedor	2021–22	Bosnian Premier League	27	7	0	0	–		27	7
Rudar Prijedor	Total		38	10	0	0	–		38	10
Željezničar	2022–23	Bosnian Premier League	27	8	6	0	–		33	8
Željezničar	2023–24	Bosnian Premier League	27	0	1	0	4	1	32	1
Željezničar	Total		54	8	7	0	4	1	65	9
Career total			92	18	7	0	4	1	103	19

== Honours ==
Rudar Prijedor

- First League of RS: 2020–21
