= 2022–23 FK Željezničar season =

Željezničar
2022–23 season
- Chairman: Oro Ibrišimović (interim, until 27 June); Edis Kovačević (from 27 June)
- Manager: Edis Mulalić (until 6 April); Nermin Bašić (from 12 April)
- Stadium: Grbavica Stadium
- Premijer Liga BiH: 3rd
- Kup BiH: Semi-finals
- Top goalscorer: League: Clarismario Santos; Joseph Amoah (8 each); All: Semir Štilić (9)
- Highest home attendance: 11,500 vs Sarajevo (26 August 2022)
- Lowest home attendance: 2,500 vs Zvijezda Gradačac (28 February 2023)
- Average home league attendance: 6,825

The 2022–23 season was Željezničar's 102nd in existence and their 23rd season in the Premier League BH. Besides competing in the domestic league, the team also competed in the National Cup.

The club finished in 3rd place in the league, qualifying for the 2023–24 UEFA Europa Conference League first qualifying round. Željezničar got knocked out from the cup in the semi-finals.

== Season review ==
=== June ===
On 8 June, Željezničar announced the signing of 20-year-old Clarismario Santos.

On 15 June, Željezničar announced the signing of 27-year-old Dženan Haračić. The club also extended their sponsorship agreement with General Logistic.

On 18 June, Željezničar and Haris Hajdarević negotiated a one-year contract extension lasting until June 2023.

On 20 June, Željezničar announced the signing of 24-year-old Stjepan Vego. The club also negotiated contract extensions with Nedim Mekić and Amar Drina.

On 21 June, Željezničar announced the signing of 26-year-old Dženis Beganović.

On 23 June, Željezničar and Armin Hodžić negotiated a contract extension.

On 27 June, Željezničar and Omar Beća negotiated a contract extension. The club also announced that Edis Kovačević had become its new chairman of the board.

=== July ===
On 1 July, Željezničar and Marin Galić negotiated a three-year contract extension lasting until July 2025. The club also negotiated a one-year contract extension with Edin Cocalić, lasting until July 2023.

On 4 July, Željezničar announced Edin Ćurić as the club's new director of its youth academy.

On 31 July, Željezničar announced the signing of 20-year-old Joseph Amoah.

=== December ===
On 20 December, Željezničar announced the departure of Sedad Subašić.

=== January ===
On 11 January, Željezničar announced the departure of Stjepan Vego. The club also signed a partnership agreement with Al-Hana Pharmacy.

On 18 January, Željezničar announced the signing of 27-year-old Irfan Jašarević.

On 19 January, Željezničar announced the signing of 20-year-old Andrija Drljo.

=== February ===
On 1 February, Željezničar announced the departure of Luka Malić.

On 4 February, Željezničar announced the signing of 32-year-old Sulejman Krpić.

On 10 February, Željezničar announced the signing of 28-year-old Armin Hodžić.

On 13 February, Željezničar extended their sponsorship agreement with Telemach.

=== April ===
On 6 April, Željezničar announced the departure of manager Edis Mulalić.

On 12 April, Željezničar announced Nermin Bašić as the club's new manager.

On 24 April, Željezničar and Budućnost Banovići signed an official club partnership.

On 25 April, Željezničar and Vedad Muftić negotiated a two-year contract extension lasting until July 2025.

== Squad information ==
=== Players ===
| N | Pos. | Nat. | Name | Age | EU | Since | App | Goals | Ends | Transfer fee | Notes |
|---|---|---|---|---|---|---|---|---|---|---|---|
| 4 | MF | (Bosnia and Herzegovina) | Hajdarević | 26 | Non-EU | 2021 | 130 | 3 | 2023 | Free | Originally from youth system |
| 5 | DF | (Bosnia and Herzegovina) | Kosorić (C) | 38 | Non-EU | 2020 | 173 | 4 | 2023 | Free | Second nationality: Serbia |
| 6 | DF | (Bosnia and Herzegovina) | Cocalić | 37 | Non-EU | 2022 | 143 | 8 | 2023 | Free | Originally from youth system |
| 7 | FW | (Bosnia and Herzegovina) | Krpić | 34 | Non-EU | 2023 | 73 | 33 | 2025 | Free | |
| 8 | MF | (Bosnia and Herzegovina) | Mekić | 30 | Non-EU | 2021 | 65 | 7 | 2024 | Free | Originally from youth system |
| 9 | FW | (Bosnia and Herzegovina) | Haračić | 31 | Non-EU | 2022 | 26 | 4 | 2023 | Free | |
| 10 | MF | (Bosnia and Herzegovina) | Bekrić | 40 | Non-EU | 2020 | 268 | 52 | 2023 | Free | |
| 11 | MF | (Bosnia and Herzegovina) | Gasal | 22 | Non-EU | 2020 | 41 | 4 | 2022 | Youth system | |
| 12 | GK | (Bosnia and Herzegovina) | Karić | 20 | Non-EU | 2022 | 0 | 0 | 2023 | Youth system | |
| 13 | GK | (Bosnia and Herzegovina) | Muftić | 23 | Non-EU | 2020 | 24 | 0 | 2025 | Youth system | |
| 14 | MF | (Bosnia and Herzegovina) | Štilić | 37 | Non-EU | 2019 | 156 | 47 | 2023 | Free | Originally from youth system |
| 15 | DF | (Bosnia and Herzegovina) | Šehić | 26 | Non-EU | 2022 | 24 | 1 | 2023 | Free | Originally from youth system |
| 17 | MF | (Bosnia and Herzegovina) | Drljo | 23 | Non-EU | 2023 | 17 | 1 | 2025 | Free | |
| 18 | MF | (Bosnia and Herzegovina) | Hodžić | 25 | Non-EU | 2022 | 46 | 8 | 2023 | Free | |
| 19 | DF | (Bosnia and Herzegovina) | Drina | 23 | Non-EU | 2020 | 45 | 0 | 2025 | Youth system | |
| 20 | MF | (Brazil) | Santos | 24 | Non-EU | 2022 | 35 | 8 | 2023 | Free | |
| 21 | FW | (Bosnia and Herzegovina) | Beganović | 29 | Non-EU | 2022 | 87 | 11 | 2023 | Free | Originally from youth system |
| 23 | MF | (Bosnia and Herzegovina) | Beća | 23 | Non-EU | 2020 | 54 | 2 | 2025 | Youth system | |
| 24 | DF | (Bosnia and Herzegovina) | Galić | 29 | EU | 2022 | 48 | 0 | 2025 | Free | Second nationality: Croatia |
| 25 | FW | (Bosnia and Herzegovina) | Križevac | 21 | Non-EU | 2022 | 2 | 0 | 2023 | Youth system | |
| 26 | MF | (Ghana) | Amoah | 23 | Non-EU | 2022 | 33 | 8 | 2024 | Free | |
| 27 | MF | (Bosnia and Herzegovina) | Pirić | 21 | Non-EU | 2022 | 0 | 0 | 2023 | Youth system | |
| 28 | GK | (Bosnia and Herzegovina) | Kobašević | 21 | Non-EU | 2022 | 0 | 0 | 2023 | Youth system | |
| 33 | DF | (Bosnia and Herzegovina) | Jašarević | 30 | Non-EU | 2023 | 17 | 1 | 2024 | Free | |
| 40 | GK | (Croatia) | Bender | 30 | EU | 2021 | 57 | 0 | 2022 | Free | Second nationality: BiH |
| 99 | FW | (Bosnia and Herzegovina) | Hodžić | 30 | Non-EU | 2023 | 73 | 20 | 2023 | Free | Originally from youth system |
| – | GK | (Bosnia and Herzegovina) | Milićević | 23 | Non-EU | 2020 | 0 | 0 | 2023 | Youth system | On loan to Stupčanica |
| – | DF | (Bosnia and Herzegovina) | Musić | 22 | Non-EU | 2021 | 1 | 0 | 2022 | Youth system | On loan to Gradina |
| – | MF | (Bosnia and Herzegovina) | Mujić | 24 | Non-EU | 2020 | 1 | 0 | 2023 | Youth system | On loan to Goražde |

- Source: fkzeljeznicar.ba

=== Disciplinary record ===
Includes all competitive matches and only players that got booked throughout the season. The list is sorted by shirt number, and then position.

| N | P | Nat. | Name | League | | | Cup | | | Europe | | | Others | | | Total | | | Notes |
| N | P | Nat. | Name | Yellow card | Second yellow card | Red card | Yellow card | Second yellow card | Red card | Yellow card | Second yellow card | Red card | Yellow card | Second yellow card | Red card | Yellow card | Second yellow card | Red card | Notes |
| 4 | MF | (Bosnia and Herzegovina) | Hajdarević | 5 | | | | | | | | | | | | 5 | | | |
| 5 | DF | (Bosnia and Herzegovina) | Kosorić | 5 | | | | | | | | | | | | 5 | | | |
| 6 | DF | (Bosnia and Herzegovina) | Cocalić | 5 | | 1 | | | | | | | | | | 5 | | 1 | |
| 7 | FW | (Bosnia and Herzegovina) | Krpić | 2 | | | 1 | | | | | | | | | 3 | | | |
| 8 | MF | (Bosnia and Herzegovina) | Mekić | 9 | | | 2 | | | | | | | | | 11 | | | |
| 9 | FW | (Bosnia and Herzegovina) | Haračić | 4 | | | | | | | | | | | | 4 | | | |
| 10 | MF | (Bosnia and Herzegovina) | Bekrić | 2 | | | | | | | | | | | | 2 | | | |
| 11 | MF | (Bosnia and Herzegovina) | Gasal | 2 | | | | | | | | | | | | 2 | | | |
| 13 | GK | (Bosnia and Herzegovina) | Muftić | 1 | | | | | | | | | | | | 1 | | | |
| 14 | MF | (Bosnia and Herzegovina) | Štilić | 3 | | | 2 | | | | | | | | | 5 | | | |
| 15 | DF | (Bosnia and Herzegovina) | Šehić | 5 | | | 1 | | | | | | | | | 6 | | | |
| 17 | MF | (Bosnia and Herzegovina) | Drljo | 3 | | | | | | | | | | | | 3 | | | |
| 18 | MF | (Bosnia and Herzegovina) | Hodžić | 8 | | | 2 | | | | | | | | | 10 | | | |
| 19 | DF | (Bosnia and Herzegovina) | Drina | 6 | | | | | | | | | | | | 6 | | | |
| 20 | MF | (Brazil) | Santos | 3 | | 1 | 1 | | | | | | | | | 4 | | 1 | |
| 21 | FW | (Bosnia and Herzegovina) | Beganović | 8 | | | 1 | | | | | | | | | 9 | | | |
| 23 | MF | (Bosnia and Herzegovina) | Beća | 2 | | | | | | | | | | | | 2 | | | |
| 24 | DF | (Bosnia and Herzegovina) | Galić | 8 | | | 1 | | | | | | | | | 9 | | | |
| 26 | MF | (Ghana) | Amoah | 3 | | | | | | | | | | | | 3 | | | |
| 33 | DF | (Bosnia and Herzegovina) | Jašarević | 3 | | | 1 | | | | | | | | | 4 | | | |
| 40 | GK | (Croatia) | Bender | 1 | | | | | | | | | | | | 1 | | | |
| 99 | FW | (Bosnia and Herzegovina) | Hodžić | 2 | | | 2 | | | | | | | | | 4 | | | |

Source: Competitive matches and fkzeljeznicar.ba
Ordered by (red card) , (second yellow card) and (yellow card)
(yellow card) = Number of bookings; (second yellow card) = Number of sending offs after a second yellow card; (red card) = Number of sending offs by a direct red card.

== Squad statistics ==
=== Goalscorers ===
| No. | Pos. | Nation | Name | Premijer Liga BiH | Kup BiH | Total |
|---|---|---|---|---|---|---|
| 14 | MF | (Bosnia and Herzegovina) | Štilić | 6 | 3 | 9 |
| 20 | MF | (Brazil) | Santos | 8 | 0 | 8 |
| 26 | MF | (Ghana) | Amoah | 8 | 0 | 8 |
| 18 | MF | (Bosnia and Herzegovina) | Hodžić | 5 | 0 | 5 |
| 9 | FW | (Bosnia and Herzegovina) | Haračić | 4 | 0 | 4 |
| 8 | MF | (Bosnia and Herzegovina) | Mekić | 3 | 0 | 3 |
| 11 | MF | (Bosnia and Herzegovina) | Gasal | 3 | 0 | 3 |
| 6 | DF | (Bosnia and Herzegovina) | Cocalić | 1 | 1 | 2 |
| 7 | FW | (Bosnia and Herzegovina) | Krpić | 2 | 0 | 2 |
| 21 | FW | (Bosnia and Herzegovina) | Beganović | 0 | 2 | 2 |
| 10 | MF | (Bosnia and Herzegovina) | Bekrić | 1 | 0 | 1 |
| 33 | DF | (Bosnia and Herzegovina) | Jašarević | 1 | 0 | 1 |
| 15 | DF | (Bosnia and Herzegovina) | Šehić | 0 | 1 | 1 |
| 17 | MF | (Bosnia and Herzegovina) | Drljo | 0 | 1 | 1 |
| 23 | MF | (Bosnia and Herzegovina) | Beća | 0 | 1 | 1 |
| 99 | FW | (Bosnia and Herzegovina) | Hodžić | 0 | 1 | 1 |
| # | Own goals | | | 0 | 0 | 0 |
| TOTAL | | | | 42 | 10 | 52 |

=== Assists ===
| No. | Pos. | Nation | Name | Premijer Liga BiH | Kup BiH | Total |
|---|---|---|---|---|---|---|
| 14 | MF | (Bosnia and Herzegovina) | Štilić | 10 | 0 | 10 |
| 20 | MF | (Brazil) | Santos | 4 | 1 | 5 |
| 21 | FW | (Bosnia and Herzegovina) | Beganović | 2 | 1 | 3 |
| 26 | MF | (Ghana) | Amoah | 2 | 1 | 3 |
| 2 | DF | (Bosnia and Herzegovina) | Malić | 2 | 0 | 2 |
| 8 | MF | (Bosnia and Herzegovina) | Mekić | 1 | 1 | 2 |
| 9 | FW | (Bosnia and Herzegovina) | Haračić | 2 | 0 | 2 |
| 17 | MF | (Bosnia and Herzegovina) | Drljo | 2 | 0 | 2 |
| 23 | MF | (Bosnia and Herzegovina) | Beća | 2 | 0 | 2 |
| 7 | FW | (Bosnia and Herzegovina) | Krpić | 1 | 0 | 1 |
| 10 | MF | (Bosnia and Herzegovina) | Bekrić | 1 | 0 | 1 |
| 33 | DF | (Bosnia and Herzegovina) | Jašarević | 1 | 0 | 1 |
| 5 | DF | (Bosnia and Herzegovina) | Kosorić | 0 | 1 | 1 |
| 6 | DF | (Bosnia and Herzegovina) | Cocalić | 0 | 1 | 1 |
| 99 | FW | (Bosnia and Herzegovina) | Hodžić | 0 | 1 | 1 |
| TOTAL | | | | 30 | 7 | 37 |

=== Clean sheets ===
| No. | Nation | Name | Premijer Liga BiH | Kup BiH | Total | Games played |
|---|---|---|---|---|---|---|
| 13 | (Bosnia and Herzegovina) | Muftić | 6 | 0 | 6 | 18 |
| 40 | (Croatia) | Bender | 3 | 0 | 3 | 21 |
| TOTAL | | | 9 | 0 | 9 | 39 |

== Transfers ==
=== Players in ===
| No. | Pos. | Nat. | Name | Age | EU | Moving from | Type | Transfer window | Ends | Transfer fee | Source |
|---|---|---|---|---|---|---|---|---|---|---|---|
| 20 | MF | (Brazil) | Clarismario Santos | 24 | Non-EU | Rudar Prijedor | End of contract | Summer | 2024 | Free | fkzeljeznicar.ba |
| 9 | FW | (Bosnia and Herzegovina) | Dženan Haračić | 31 | Non-EU | GOŠK Gabela | End of contract | Summer | 2023 | Free | fkzeljeznicar.ba |
| 25 | DF | (Bosnia and Herzegovina) | Stjepan Vego | 28 | EU | GOŠK Gabela | End of contract | Summer | 2023 | Free | fkzeljeznicar.ba |
| 21 | FW | (Bosnia and Herzegovina) | Dženis Beganović | 29 | Non-EU | Sloboda Tuzla | End of contract | Summer | 2023 | Free | fkzeljeznicar.ba |
| 26 | MF | (Ghana) | Joseph Amoah | 23 | Non-EU | Accra Lions (Ghana) | End of contract | Summer | 2023 | Free | fkzeljeznicar.ba |
| 33 | DF | (Bosnia and Herzegovina) | Irfan Jašarević | 30 | Non-EU | Olympic (Sweden) | End of contract | Winter | 2024 | Free | fkzeljeznicar.ba |
| 17 | MF | (Bosnia and Herzegovina) | Andrija Drljo | 23 | Non-EU | Zrinjski Mostar | End of contract | Winter | 2025 | Free | fkzeljeznicar.ba |
| 7 | FW | (Bosnia and Herzegovina) | Sulejman Krpić | 34 | Non-EU | Western Sydney Wanderers (Australia) | End of contract | Winter | 2025 | Free | fkzeljeznicar.ba |
| 99 | FW | (Bosnia and Herzegovina) | Armin Hodžić | 30 | Non-EU | Fehérvár (Hungary) | End of contract | Winter | 2023 | Free | fkzeljeznicar.ba |

Total expenditure: ▼€0

=== Players out ===
| No. | Pos. | Nat. | Name | Age | EU | Moving to | Type | Transfer window | Transfer fee | Source |
|---|---|---|---|---|---|---|---|---|---|---|
| 21 | DF | (Croatia) | Ante Blažević | 29 | EU | Levski Sofia (Bulgaria) | End of contract | Summer | Free | levski.bg |
| 9 | FW | (Austria) | Aleksandar Vučenović | 27 | EU | Enosis Neon Paralimni (Cyprus) | End of contract | Summer | Free | enosisneonparalimni |
| 16 | MF | (Bosnia and Herzegovina) | Dženan Osmanović | 25 | Non-EU | TOŠK Tešanj | End of contract | Summer | Free | tosktesanj |
| 22 | MF | (Bosnia and Herzegovina) | Armin Ćerimagić | 31 | Non-EU | Retirement | Retirement | Summer | Free | |
| 26 | MF | (Bosnia and Herzegovina) | Faruk Duraković | 23 | Non-EU | TOŠK Tešanj | End of contract | Summer | Free | tosktesanj |
| 30 | DF | (Bosnia and Herzegovina) | Branimir Vištica | 24 | EU | Neretva (Croatia) | End of contract | Summer | Free | |
| 17 | DF | (Bosnia and Herzegovina) | Denis Kovačević | 22 | EU | İstanbulspor (Turkey) | End of contract | Summer | Free | istanbulspor |
| 72 | MF | (Bosnia and Herzegovina) | Ševkija Resić | 25 | Non-EU | Zvijezda 09 | End of contract | Summer | Free | fkzvijezda09.com |
| 29 | FW | (Nigeria) | Adeshina Fatai | 26 | Non-EU | GOŠK Gabela | End of contract | Summer | Free | nkgoskgabela |
| 10 | FW | (Bosnia and Herzegovina) | Ermin Zec | 37 | Non-EU | Retirement | Retirement | Summer | Free | |
| 17 | MF | (Bosnia and Herzegovina) | Neriman Kočević | 21 | Non-EU | Orijent 1919 (Croatia) | End of contract | Summer | Free | |
| 18 | MF | (Bosnia and Herzegovina) | Damir Hrelja | 23 | Non-EU | Igman Konjic | Contract termination | Summer | Free | fkigman.com |
| 20 | MF | (Bosnia and Herzegovina) | Edin Mujić | 24 | Non-EU | Goražde | Loan | Summer | Free | fkgorazde |
| 27 | DF | (Bosnia and Herzegovina) | Amar Musić | 22 | Non-EU | Gradina | Loan | Summer | Free | ofkgradina |
| 92 | GK | (Bosnia and Herzegovina) | Nikola Milićević | 23 | Non-EU | Stupčanica | Loan | Summer | Free | nkstupcanica |
| 7 | MF | (Bosnia and Herzegovina) | Sedad Subašić | 24 | Non-EU | Tuzla City | Contract termination | Winter | Free | Klix.ba |
| 25 | DF | (Bosnia and Herzegovina) | Stjepan Vego | 28 | EU | Free agent | Contract termination | Winter | Free | Klix.ba |
| 27 | MF | (Bosnia and Herzegovina) | Ardonis Mućaj | 21 | Non-EU | Velež Mostar | Contract termination | Winter | Free | fkvelez.ba |
| 2 | DF | (Bosnia and Herzegovina) | Luka Malić | 25 | Non-EU | Radnički 1923 (Serbia) | Contract termination | Winter | Free | sportsport.ba |

Total income: ▲€
Net: ▲€

== Club ==
=== Coaching staff ===
| Name | Role |
|---|---|
| (Bosnia and Herzegovina) Nermin Bašić | Head coach |
| (Bosnia and Herzegovina) Jadranko Bogičević | Assistant |
| (Bosnia and Herzegovina) Haris Alihodžić | Assistant |
| (Bosnia and Herzegovina) Kenan Hasagić | Goalkeeping coach |
| (Bosnia and Herzegovina) Adnan Behlulović | Fitness coach |
| (Serbia) Jasmin Kolašinac | Video analyst |
| (Bosnia and Herzegovina) Zlatko Dervišević | Doctor |
| (Bosnia and Herzegovina) Edin Kulenović | Doctor |
| (Bosnia and Herzegovina) Harun Đozić | Doctor |
| (Bosnia and Herzegovina) Raif Zeba | Physiotherapist |
| (Bosnia and Herzegovina) Adil Hubijar | Physiotherapist |
| (Bosnia and Herzegovina) Erdijan Pekić | Commissioner for Security |

=== Other information ===
| Honorary Chairman of the Club | (Bosnia and Herzegovina) Ivica Osim |
| Chairman of the Board | (Bosnia and Herzegovina) Edis Kovačević |
| Chairman of the Assembly | (Bosnia and Herzegovina) Edin Cernica |
| Chairman of the Supervisory Board | (Bosnia and Herzegovina) Damir Ablaković |
| Director | (Bosnia and Herzegovina) Amira Bajrović-Uzunović |
| Sporting director | (Bosnia and Herzegovina) Samir Bekrić |
| Director of the Youth Academy | (Bosnia and Herzegovina) Edin Ćurić |
| Head coach | (Bosnia and Herzegovina) Nermin Bašić |
| Ground (capacity and dimensions) | Grbavica Stadium (13,146 / 105x66 m) |

Source: FK Željezničar and Grbavica Stadium

=== Sponsorship ===
As of 13 February 2023

| Name | Type |
|---|---|
| (Germany) (Switzerland) Caizcoin | General sponsor |
| (United Kingdom) Admiral Casino | Gold sponsor |
| (Bosnia and Herzegovina) Lutrija BiH | Gold sponsor |
| (Serbia) Mozzart | Gold sponsor |
| (Bosnia and Herzegovina) Sarajevo osiguranje | Gold sponsor |
| (Croatia) Adriatic osiguranje | Sponsor |
| (Bosnia and Herzegovina) Amko komerc | Sponsor |
| (Bosnia and Herzegovina) BioMedicalab | Sponsor |
| (Bosnia and Herzegovina) Brajlović | Sponsor |
| (Bosnia and Herzegovina) Central osiguranje | Sponsor |
| (Bosnia and Herzegovina) Deny-Prom | Sponsor |
| (Bosnia and Herzegovina) ELPI Comerc | Sponsor |
| (Bosnia and Herzegovina) Bony | Sponsor |
| (Bosnia and Herzegovina) Rooster | Sponsor |
| (Bosnia and Herzegovina) Vivia | Sponsor |
| (France) (Bosnia and Herzegovina) Hotel Novotel | Sponsor |
| (Bosnia and Herzegovina) Eko sir Puđa | Sponsor |
| (Bosnia and Herzegovina) Infomedia | Sponsor |
| (Bosnia and Herzegovina) Mont Inženjering | Sponsor |
| (Slovenia) Europlakat | Sponsor |
| (Bosnia and Herzegovina) Garden City Konjic | Sponsor |
| (Bosnia and Herzegovina) Hotel Hills | Sponsor |
| (Bosnia and Herzegovina) HOŠE Komerc | Sponsor |
| (Bosnia and Herzegovina) Mliječna industrija 99 | Sponsor |
| (Bosnia and Herzegovina) Media Market | Sponsor |
| (Bosnia and Herzegovina) Winner Project | Sponsor |
| (Bosnia and Herzegovina) Eurofarm Centar Poliklinika | Sponsor |
| (Croatia) Franck | Sponsor |
| (Bosnia and Herzegovina) ProTeam | Sponsor |
| (Bosnia and Herzegovina) ASA Osiguranje | Sponsor |
| (Bosnia and Herzegovina) Capo di horeca | Sponsor |
| (Bosnia and Herzegovina) Crystal Ice | Sponsor |
| (Bosnia and Herzegovina) Gama AA Security | Sponsor |
| (Bosnia and Herzegovina) In Time | Sponsor |
| (Croatia) Sky Cola | Sponsor |
| (Slovenia) NLB Banka | Sponsor |
| (Bosnia and Herzegovina) Farmavita | Sponsor |
| (Bosnia and Herzegovina) Sarajevski kiseljak | Sponsor |
| (Italy) Macron | Technical sponsor |
| (Bosnia and Herzegovina) Leda | Technical sponsor |
| (Bosnia and Herzegovina) Telemach | Technical sponsor |
| (Bosnia and Herzegovina) General Logistic | Technical sponsor |
| (Bosnia and Herzegovina) 1921.ba | Media partner |
| (Bosnia and Herzegovina) Hayat TV | Media partner |
| (Bosnia and Herzegovina) Antena Sarajevo | Media partner |
| (Bosnia and Herzegovina) Sport1.ba | Media partner |
| (Bosnia and Herzegovina) Klix | Media partner |
| (Bosnia and Herzegovina) Dnevni avaz | Media partner |
| (Bosnia and Herzegovina) MFS-Emmaus | Community partner |
| (Bosnia and Herzegovina) Ruku na srce | Community partner |
| (Bosnia and Herzegovina) SUMERO | Community partner |
| (Bosnia and Herzegovina) Erasmus | Community partner |

== Competitions ==
=== Pre-season ===
| 25 June 2022 Friendly | Željezničar (Bosnia and Herzegovina) | 2–0 | (Bosnia and Herzegovina) Igman Konjic | Sarajevo |
| 18:00 | Gasal 51'; Beganović 72' | Report | | Stadium: Grbavica Stadium |

| 2 July 2022 Friendly | Kolubara (Serbia) | 1–2 | (Bosnia and Herzegovina) Željezničar | Zlatibor, Serbia |
| 18:00 | Stojanović 52' | Report | Mekić 23' (pen.), 42' | Stadium: Stadion Švajcarija |

| 5 July 2022 Friendly | Željezničar (Bosnia and Herzegovina) | 3–0 | (Montenegro) Rudar Pljevlja | Zlatibor, Serbia |
| 18:30 | Mekić 17' (pen.); Beća 79'; Haračić 86' | Report | | Stadium: Stadion Švajcarija |

| 8 July 2022 Friendly | Željezničar (Bosnia and Herzegovina) | 0–0 | (Montenegro) Mornar | Zlatibor, Serbia |
| 13:00 | | Report | | Stadium: Stadion Švajcarija |

=== Mid-season ===
| 21 September 2022 Friendly | Zvijezda Gradačac (Bosnia and Herzegovina) | 4–3 | (Bosnia and Herzegovina) Željezničar | Gradačac |
| 16:00 | Živković 16', 21'; Mujagić 30', 37' | Report | Pločo 57'; Efendić 64'; Brković 72' | Stadium: Stadion Banja Ilidža |

| 23 November 2022 Friendly | Vardar (North Macedonia) | 2–0 | (Bosnia and Herzegovina) Željezničar | Skopje, North Macedonia |
| 19:30 | Janevski 44'; Partalko 73' | Report | | Stadium: Toše Proeski Arena |

| 29 November 2022 Friendly | Željezničar (Bosnia and Herzegovina) | 1–2 | (Turkey) Konyaspor | Sarajevo |
| 18:00 | Hajdarević 21' | Report | Ikpeazu 7'; Pavičić 11' | Stadium: Grbavica Stadium |

| 25 January 2023 Friendly | Željezničar (Bosnia and Herzegovina) | 1–0 | (Bosnia and Herzegovina) Budućnost Banovići | Konjic |
| 14:30 | Hajdarević 17' | Report |

| 29 January 2023 Friendly | Željezničar (Bosnia and Herzegovina) | 9–0 | (Bosnia and Herzegovina) Sutjeska Foča | Konjic |
| 14:30 | Križevac 2'; Amoah 31'; Drljo 34', 47'; Beganović 59', 84'; Šehić 83'; Santos 85'; Haračić 86' | Report |

| 6 February 2023 Friendly | Željezničar (Bosnia and Herzegovina) | 1–0 | (Bosnia and Herzegovina) Široki Brijeg | Konjic |
| 14:00 | Pirić 90' | Report |

| 9 February 2023 Friendly | Željezničar (Bosnia and Herzegovina) | 0–0 | (Bosnia and Herzegovina) Bratstvo Gračanica | Konjic |
| 14:30 | | Report |

=== Overall ===
| Competition | Started round | Final result | First match | Last Match |
|---|---|---|---|---|
| Premijer Liga BiH | — | 3rd | 16 July 2022 | 28 May 2023 |
| Kup BiH | First round | Semi-finals | 19 October 2022 | 19 April 2023 |

=== League table ===
| Pos | Team | Pld | W | D | L | GF | GA | GD | Pts | Qualification or relegation |
|---|---|---|---|---|---|---|---|---|---|---|
| 1 | Zrinjski Mostar (C) | 33 | 25 | 3 | 5 | 66 | 21 | +45 | 78 | Qualification for the Champions League first qualifying round |
| 2 | Borac Banja Luka | 33 | 18 | 4 | 11 | 39 | 32 | +7 | 58 | Qualification to Europa Conference League second qualifying round |
| 3 | Željezničar | 33 | 15 | 8 | 10 | 42 | 35 | +7 | 53 | Qualification to Europa Conference League first qualifying round |
| 4 | Sarajevo | 33 | 15 | 7 | 11 | 50 | 46 | +4 | 52 | Qualification to Europa Conference League first qualifying round |
| 5 | Široki Brijeg | 33 | 13 | 9 | 11 | 38 | 36 | +2 | 48 | |

Source: Rezultati.com
Rules for classification: 1) Points; 2) Goal difference; 3) Goals scored; 4) Head-to-head points; 5) Head-to-head goal difference; 6) Head-to-head away goals (only if two teams); 7) Head-to-head goals scored; 8) Goal difference; 9) Play-off. (Criteria 2 and 3 are not used to decide champion, UEFA competition qualification, or relegation)
(C) Champions

==== Results summary ====
| Overall | | | | | | | | Home | | | | | | Away | | | | | |
| Pld | W | D | L | GF | GA | GD | Pts | W | D | L | GF | GA | GD | W | D | L | GF | GA | GD |
|---|---|---|---|---|---|---|---|---|---|---|---|---|---|---|---|---|---|---|---|
| 33 | 15 | 8 | 10 | 42 | 35 | +7 | 53 | 9 | 5 | 3 | 26 | 14 | +12 | 6 | 3 | 7 | 16 | 21 | −5 |

Source: Sportsport.ba

==== Results by round ====
| Round | 1 | 2 | 3 | 4 | 5 | 6 | 7 | 8 | 9 | 10 | 11 | 12 | 13 | 14 | 15 | 16 | 17 | 19 | 20 | 21 | 18^{1} | 22 | 23 | 24 | 25 | 26 | 27 | 28 | 29 | 30 | 31 | 32 | 33 |
|---|---|---|---|---|---|---|---|---|---|---|---|---|---|---|---|---|---|---|---|---|---|---|---|---|---|---|---|---|---|---|---|---|---|
| Ground | H | A | H | A | H | A | H | A | H | A | H | A | H | A | H | A | H | H | A | H | A | A | H | A | H | A | H | A | H | H | A | H | A |
| Result | D | W | D | L | W | L | D | W | W | D | W | W | L | L | W | W | L | D | L | W | D | W | W | L | L | L | W | L | D | W | D | W | W |
| Position | 6 | 3 | 3 | 4 | 3 | 5 | 5 | 4 | 2 | 3 | 2 | 1 | 3 | 4 | 3 | 3 | 4 | 4 | 4 | 4 | 4 | 4 | 4 | 4 | 5 | 5 | 3 | 5 | 6 | 4 | 4 | 4 | 3 |
| Points | 1 | 4 | 5 | 5 | 8 | 8 | 9 | 12 | 15 | 16 | 19 | 22 | 22 | 22 | 25 | 28 | 28 | 29 | 29 | 32 | 33 | 36 | 39 | 39 | 39 | 39 | 42 | 42 | 43 | 46 | 47 | 50 | 53 |

Source: Competitions
A = Away; H = Home; W = Win; D = Draw; L = Loss

^{1} Match of Round 18 postponed because of a new pitch being constructed at the Asim Ferhatović Hase Stadium.

==== Matches ====
| 16 July 2022 1 | Željezničar | 1–1 | Leotar | Sarajevo |
| 21:00 | Cocalić 24'; Šehić (yellow card) 45' | Report | Todorović 20'; Milović (yellow card) 28'; Matković (yellow card) 35'; Stanojević (yellow card) 74'; Kordić (yellow card) 79' | Stadium: Grbavica Stadium; Attendance: 4,000; Referee: Miloš Gigović (Gradiška) |

| 24 July 2022 2 | Zrinjski Mostar | 1–2 | Željezničar | Mostar |
| 21:00 | Bilbija 36'; Ćorluka (yellow card) 66' (yellow-red card) 81' | Report | Bender (yellow card) 36'; Malić (yellow card) 62'; Gasal 64', (yellow card) 77'; Mekić 83'; Haračić (yellow card) 88'; Beća (yellow card) 90' | Stadium: Stadion pod Bijelim Brijegom; Attendance: 4,000; Referee: Mirza Kazlagić (Cazin) |

| 31 July 2022 3 | Željezničar | 1–1 | Široki Brijeg | Sarajevo |
| 19:00 | Malić (yellow card) 29'; Santos 41'; Beganović (yellow card) 63'; Hodžić (yellow card) 67'; Kosorić (yellow card) 84' | Report | Mašić (yellow card) 7'; Kuprešak (yellow card) 44'; Bruno (yellow card) 45'; Valinčić (yellow card) 59'; Vukoja (yellow card) 90+1', (goal) 90+5' | Stadium: Grbavica Stadium; Attendance: 7,600; Referee: Luka Bilbija (Prijedor) |

| 5 August 2022 4 | Velež Mostar | 3–1 | Željezničar | Gabela |
| 17:30 | Bajrić (yellow card) 33'; Dejanović 35'; Pavić (yellow card) 59'; Anđušić 71'; Hasanović (yellow card) 74'; Zeljković (yellow card) 81'; Haskić 90' | Report | Štilić 48'; Mekić (yellow card) 56'; Beganović (yellow card) 75' | Stadium: Stadium Perica-Pero Pavlović; Attendance: 2,000; Referee: Irfan Peljto (Sarajevo) |

| 13 August 2022 5 | Željezničar | 4–2 | Tuzla City | Sarajevo |
| 21:00 | Štilić 39' (pen.); Gasal (yellow card) 42', (goal) 48', 53'; Santos 60' (pen.); Hodžić (yellow card) 80'; Hajdarević (yellow card) 90' | Report | Mehidić (yellow card) 26'; Karić (yellow card) 30'; Mešinović (yellow card) 36'; Nukić (yellow card) 38'; Smajlagić 75'; Veselinović 82'; Karjašević (yellow card) 85'; Eleouet (yellow card) 87' | Stadium: Grbavica Stadium; Attendance: 4,300; Referee: Frano Jelić (Široki Brijeg) |

| 20 August 2022 6 | Borac Banja Luka | 2–1 | Željezničar | Novi Grad |
| 17:00 | Vego 13' (o.g.); Tatar (yellow card) 25'; Vojnović 42', (yellow card) 76'; Zakarić (yellow card) 61' | Report | Vego (yellow card) 23'; Hajdarević (yellow card) 40'; Santos (yellow card) 60'; Štilić 77' (pen.); Beća (yellow card) 90'; Šehić (yellow card) 90+2' | Stadium: Stadion Mlakve; Attendance: 4,000; Referee: Mirza Kazlagić (Cazin) |

| 26 August 2022 7 | Željezničar | 2–2 | Sarajevo | Sarajevo |
| 20:00 | Santos (yellow card) 37'; Cocalić (yellow card) 40'; Štilić (yellow card) 83'; Haračić 88'; Bekrić 90+6', (yellow card) 90+8' | Report | Musa (yellow card) 16', (goal) 76'; Čirjak (yellow card) 34' (yellow-red card) 45'; Varešanović (yellow card) 40'; Ikić 48' (pen.); Šahinović (yellow card) 90'; Drobarov (yellow card) 90+2'; Đokanović (yellow card) 90+5' | Stadium: Grbavica Stadium; Attendance: 11,500; Referee: Admir Šehović (Sarajevo) |

| 31 August 2022 8 | Posušje | 1–2 | Željezničar | Posušje |
| 17:30 | Pavlović (yellow card) 12'; Bešlić (yellow card) 45+1'; Lučić (yellow card) 45+2'; Horić (yellow card) 65'; Pavković 71' | Report | Haračić 12', 41', (yellow card) 72'; Galić (yellow card) 79' | Stadium: Mokri Dolac Stadium; Attendance: 2,500; Referee: Dragan Petrović (Banja Luka) |

| 5 September 2022 9 | Željezničar | 1–0 | Igman Konjic | Sarajevo |
| 19:00 | Drina (yellow card) 17'; Amoah 74' | Report | Ćubara (yellow card) 6'; Jakupović (yellow card) 40'; Biber (yellow card) 77'; Alagić (yellow card) 82' | Stadium: Grbavica Stadium; Attendance: 4,000; Referee: Antoni Bandić (Grude) |

| 10 September 2022 10 | Sloboda Tuzla | 1–1 | Željezničar | Banovići |
| 16:00 | Osmić (yellow card) 45'; Osmanković 70'; Komazec (yellow card) 81' | Report | Hodžić 53'; Kosorić (yellow card) 77' | Stadium: Stadion FK Budućnost; Attendance: 900; Referee: Josip Martinović (Čapljina) |

| 18 September 2022 11 | Željezničar | 1–0 | Sloga Doboj | Sarajevo |
| 19:00 | Haračić (yellow card) 15'; Hodžić 38'; Mekić (yellow card) 68'; Kosorić (yellow card) 85' | Report | Baštić (yellow card) 43'; Stapić (yellow card) 67'; Milanović (yellow card) 71'; Zajić (yellow card) 75' | Stadium: Grbavica Stadium; Attendance: 7,000; Referee: Sabrija Topalović (Zenica) |

| 1 October 2022 12 | Leotar | 0–1 | Željezničar | Trebinje |
| 15:00 | Stojković (yellow card) 49'; Matković (yellow card) 54'; Cmiljanović (yellow card) 70'; Milović (yellow card) 73' | Report | Hodžić 18'; Bekrić (yellow card) 28'; Beganović (yellow card) 52'; Galić (yellow card) 81'; Mekić (yellow card) 90' | Stadium: Police Stadium; Attendance: 500; Referee: Frano Jelić (Široki Brijeg) |

| 8 October 2022 13 | Željezničar | 0–1 | Zrinjski Mostar | Sarajevo |
| 17:00 | Hodžić (yellow card) 48'; Galić (yellow card) 65'; Drina (yellow card) 90' | Report | Tičinović 30', (yellow card) 42'; Ilinković (yellow card) 53'; Jakovljević (yellow card) 74'; Stranput (yellow card) 86'; Memija (yellow card) 88'; Čondrić (yellow card) 90+6'; Zubairu (yellow card) 90+7' | Stadium: Grbavica Stadium; Attendance: 10,428; Referee: Irfan Peljto (Sarajevo) |

| 15 October 2022 14 | Široki Brijeg | 1–0 | Željezničar | Široki Brijeg |
| 19:00 | Lukić (yellow card) 18'; Bagarić 61'; Ćavar (yellow card) 64'; Josipović (yellow card) 89' | Report | Hajdarević (yellow card) 45'; Drina (yellow card) 54'; Amoah (yellow card) 56'; Cocalić (yellow card) 57'; Mekić (yellow card) 90' | Stadium: Pecara Stadium; Attendance: 3,500; Referee: Dragan Petrović (Banja Luka) |

| 22 October 2022 15 | Željezničar | 2–0 | Velež Mostar | Sarajevo |
| 17:00 | Amoah 51'; Cocalić (yellow card) 86'; Mekić 90' (pen.) | Report | Halilović (yellow card) 45'; Zeljković (yellow card) 60'; Ikić (yellow card) 90' | Stadium: Grbavica Stadium; Attendance: 7,600; Referee: Frano Jelić (Široki Brijeg) |

| 31 October 2022 16 | Tuzla City | 1–2 | Željezničar | Srebrenik |
| 14:00 | Nukić (yellow card) 29' (yellow-red card) 64'; Mehidić (yellow card) 55'; Pantelić 79' | Report | Malić (yellow card) 19'; Amoah 42'; Štilić 57'; Subašić (yellow card) 89'; Beganović (yellow card) 90' | Stadium: Gradski Stadion; Attendance: 1,000; Referee: Josip Martinović (Čapljina) |

| 6 November 2022 17 | Željezničar | 1–2 | Borac Banja Luka | Sarajevo |
| 19:30 | Hodžić (yellow card) 15'; Amoah 27', (yellow card) 45+1'; Mekić (yellow card) 45+2'; Kosorić (yellow card) 46'; Santos (red card) 57'; Beganović (yellow card) 84'; Štilić (yellow card) 84'; Galić (yellow card) 88' | Report | Andrić (yellow card) 26'; Kulašin 34'; Gajić (yellow card) 46'; Tatar (yellow card) 72'; Piščević 82', (yellow card) 90+5'; Ćetković (yellow card) 90+1'; Zakarić (yellow card) 90+1' | Stadium: Grbavica Stadium; Attendance: 10,000; Referee: Luka Bilbija (Prijedor) |

| 19 November 2022 19 | Željezničar | 1–1 | Posušje | Sarajevo |
| 17:00 | Hodžić 35'; Malić (yellow card) 51' (yellow-red card) 90'; Cocalić (yellow card) 64'; Hajdarević (yellow card) 75' | Report | Bešlić (yellow card) 7'; Krišto (yellow card) 40'; Roca (yellow card) 45'; Jović 50'; L. Begić (yellow card) 77'; Boban (yellow card) 90' | Stadium: Grbavica Stadium; Attendance: 5,900; Referee: Dražen Marić (Bijeljina) |

| 25 February 2023 20 | Igman Konjic | 3–1 | Željezničar | Konjic |
| 13:00 | Oremuš (yellow card) 28' (yellow-red card) 85'; Ramić 34'; Ahmetović 76'; Bojo 90' (pen.) | Report | Galić (yellow card) 22'; Krpić 89', (yellow card) 90' | Stadium: Konjic City Stadium; Attendance: 2,150; Referee: Antoni Bandić (Grude) |

| 4 March 2023 21 | Željezničar | 1–0 | Sloboda Tuzla | Sarajevo |
| 16:00 | Mekić 20' (pen.); Drljo (yellow card) 68' | Report | Bukvić (yellow card) 18'; Mehmedović (yellow card) 50'; Pervan (yellow card) 52'; Kurtalić (yellow card) 65'; Jusić (yellow card) 77'; Maksimović (yellow card) 87' | Stadium: Grbavica Stadium; Attendance: 3,000; Referee: Dražen Marić (Bijeljina) |

| 8 March 2023 18 (Note: Match of Round 18 postponed because of a new pitch being constructed at the Asim Ferhatović Hase Stadium.) | Sarajevo | 0–0 | Željezničar | Zenica |
| 13:00 | Džafić (yellow card) 78' | Report | Galić (yellow card) 26'; Beganović (yellow card) 65'; Kosorić (yellow card) 69' | Stadium: Bosnian FA Training Centre; Attendance: 0 (Note: Played behind closed doors to prevent potentially dangerous clashes between rival supporters.); Referee: Admir Musić (Sarajevo) |

| 12 March 2023 22 | Sloga Doboj | 0–1 | Željezničar | Modriča |
| 15:00 | Popara (yellow card) 31'; Lalić (yellow card) 32' | Report | Hodžić (yellow card) 20'; Mekić (yellow card) 36'; Jašarević (yellow card) 42'; Santos 82'; Hodžić (yellow card) 90' | Stadium: Stadion Dr. Milan Jelić; Attendance: 800; Referee: Aleksandar Njegomirović (Prnjavor) |

| 19 March 2023 23 | Željezničar | 4–1 | Sloga Doboj | Sarajevo |
| 15:00 | Santos 22', 50', (yellow card) 23'; Hodžić (yellow card) 26'; Šehić (yellow card) 31'; Galić (yellow card) 41'; Štilić 60' (pen.); Amoah 79' | Report | Lalić 36'; Brajlović (yellow card) 58'; Mihajlović (yellow card) 78' | Stadium: Grbavica Stadium; Attendance: 5,500; Referee: Mateo Musa (Čitluk) |

| 1 April 2023 24 | Leotar | 1–0 | Željezničar | Trebinje |
| 15:00 | Prusina (yellow card) 29'; Stojković 32'; Đajić (yellow card) 41'; Čubrilo (yellow card) 70'; Handžić (yellow card) 90'; Šipovac (yellow card) 90+2'; Milović (yellow card) 90+4' | Report | Jašarević (yellow card) 35'; Beganović (yellow card) 58'; Drina (yellow card) 62' | Stadium: Police Stadium; Attendance: 1,500; Referee: Frano Jelić (Široki Brijeg) |

| 8 April 2023 25 | Željezničar | 0–1 | Tuzla City | Sarajevo |
| 20:00 | Krpić (yellow card) 53'; Beganović (yellow card) 82'; Štilić (yellow card) 90' | Report | Karić 24'; Diaby (yellow card) 29' (yellow-red card) 67'; Karjašević (yellow card) 30'; Čeliković (yellow card) 60'; Ivaniadze (yellow card) 61'; Fejzić (yellow card) 90' | Stadium: Grbavica Stadium; Attendance: 4,000; Referee: Darko Gedžić (Brčko) |

| 14 April 2023 26 | Zrinjski Mostar | 2–0 | Željezničar | Čitluk |
| 15:00 | Bilbija 11', 26' | Report | Šehić (yellow card) 26' | Stadium: Bare Stadium; Attendance: 800; Referee: Frano Jelić (Široki Brijeg) |

| 22 April 2023 27 | Željezničar | 1–0 | Široki Brijeg | Sarajevo |
| 20:30 | Jašarević (yellow card) 10'; Mekić (yellow card) 45'; Amoah 47', (yellow card) 90' | Report | Kpan (yellow card) 8'; Bagarić (yellow card) 27'; Lovrić (yellow card) 72'; Pranjić (yellow card) 83'; Mašić (yellow card) 90+2'; Pejić (yellow card) 90+4' | Stadium: Grbavica Stadium; Attendance: 5,100; Referee: Irfan Peljto (Sarajevo) |

| 27 April 2023 28 | Borac Banja Luka | 2–0 | Željezničar | Banja Luka |
| 18:00 | Mrkaić 72', (yellow card) 73'; Piščević 77' | Report | Hodžić (yellow card) 25'; Muftić (yellow card) 43'; Hajdarević (yellow card) 45'; Galić (yellow card) 50' | Stadium: Banja Luka City Stadium; Attendance: 5,000; Referee: Aleksandar Njegomirović (Prnjavor) |

| 2 May 2023 29 | Željezničar | 1–1 | Igman Konjic | Sarajevo |
| 20:00 | Amoah 52'; Haračić (yellow card) 90' | Report | Ramić 25'; Bodul (yellow card) 47'; Bešagić (yellow card) 87'; Oremuš (yellow card) 90' | Stadium: Grbavica Stadium; Attendance: 8,000; Referee: Sabrija Topalović (Zenica) |

| 7 May 2023 30 | Željezničar | 2–1 | Velež Mostar | Sarajevo |
| 19:30 | Santos 20'; Haračić 72'; Drljo (yellow card) 86'; Šehić (yellow card) 90' | Report | Anđušić (yellow card) 31', (goal) 52'; Vehabović (yellow card) 34'; Šikalo (yellow card) 45'; Lauš (yellow card) 72' | Stadium: Grbavica Stadium; Attendance: 7,100; Referee: Ermin Sivac (Zenica) |

| 12 May 2023 31 | Sarajevo | 2–2 | Željezničar | Sarajevo |
| 20:00 | Varešanović 35'; Jelić Balta (yellow card) 42'; Musa (yellow card) 44'; Šerbečić (yellow card) 71'; Oliveira 75'; Ramić (red card) 90+5' | Report | Mekić (yellow card) 42'; Hodžić (yellow card) 42'; Drina (yellow card) 66'; Jašarević 79'; Krpić 90+6' | Stadium: Asim Ferhatović Hase Stadium; Attendance: 13,000; Referee: Irfan Peljto (Sarajevo) |

| 21 May 2023 32 | Željezničar | 3–0 | Posušje | Sarajevo |
| 17:00 | Mekić (yellow card) 33'; Cocalić (yellow card) 38'; Hodžić (yellow card) 79', (goal) 83'; Štilić 88' (pen.); Amoah 90' | Report | Z. Begić (yellow card) 23'; Bešlić (yellow card) 32'; Jović (yellow card) 48'; Kukić (yellow card) 76'; Lučić (yellow card) 79'; Pavlović (red card) 86' | Stadium: Grbavica Stadium; Attendance: 11,000; Referee: Elvedin Topuzović (Tuzla) |

| 28 May 2023 33 | Sloboda Tuzla | 1–2 | Željezničar | Tuzla |
| 17:00 | Kurtalić (yellow card) 29'; Delić (yellow card) 32'; Jusić 87' | Report | Santos 7', 50'; Drljo (yellow card) 51'; Drina (yellow card) 76' | Stadium: Tušanj City Stadium; Attendance: 7,000; Referee: Irfan Peljto (Sarajevo) |

=== Kup BiH ===
==== Round of 32 ====
| 19 October 2022 | Budućnost Banovići | 1–2 | Željezničar | Banovići |
| 14:00 | Đerzić (yellow card) 25'; Pirić (yellow card) 51'; Avdić 54' | Report | Beganović 36'; Cocalić 59' | Stadium: Stadion FK Budućnost; Attendance: 600; Referee: Ermin Sivac (Zenica) |

==== Round of 16 ====
| 18 February 2023 | Željezničar | 2–1 | Leotar | Sarajevo |
| 16:00 | Krpić (yellow card) 33'; Štilić 41' (pen.), (yellow card) 85'; Hodžić (yellow card) 58'; Jašarević (yellow card) 70'; Drljo 87' | Report | Čavić (yellow card) 21'; Aćimović 29'; Prusina (yellow card) 36' (yellow-red card) 59'; Đurić (red card) 40' | Stadium: Grbavica Stadium; Attendance: 6,500; Referee: Elvedin Topuzović (Tuzla) |

==== Quarter-finals ====
| 28 February 2023 First leg | Željezničar | 2–1 | Zvijezda Gradačac | Sarajevo |
| 18:00 | Hodžić 57', (yellow card) 63'; Beganović 77'; Štilić (yellow card) 80'; Santos (yellow card) 90' | Report | Bijelić (yellow card) 17'; Mikić (yellow card) 60'; Mujagić (yellow card) 63'; Škrijelj 80' | Stadium: Grbavica Stadium; Attendance: 2,500; Referee: Dragan Kesić (Gradiška) |

| 16 March 2023 Second leg | Zvijezda Gradačac | 2–3 (3–5 agg.) | Željezničar | Gradačac |
| 15:00 | Mujagić 2'; Mikić (yellow card) 27'; Huseinbašić (yellow card) 45', (goal) 47'; Fačić (yellow card) 57'; Avdić (yellow card) 68'; Assaf (yellow card) 74' | Report | Štilić 50', 51'; Galić (yellow card) 57'; Beganović (yellow card) 75'; Šehić 78'; Mekić (yellow card) 81'; Hodžić (yellow card) 89' | Stadium: Banja Ilidža; Attendance: 2,500; Referee: Antoni Bandić (Grude) |

==== Semi-finals ====
| 5 April 2023 First leg | Velež Mostar | 1–0 | Željezničar | Mostar |
| 20:30 | Šikalo 7'; Hrkać (yellow card) 17'; Vehabović (yellow card) 61'; Dejanović (yellow card) 75' | Report | Hodžić (yellow card) 38'; Šehić (yellow card) 65'; Mekić (yellow card) 88' | Stadium: Stadion Rođeni; Attendance: 3,500; Referee: Antoni Bandić (Grude) |

| 19 April 2023 Second leg | Željezničar | 1–2 (1–3 agg.) | Velež Mostar | Sarajevo |
| 18:30 | Beća 7' | Report | Zvonić 16'; Šikalo (yellow card) 27'; Anđušić 72' | Stadium: Grbavica Stadium; Attendance: 5,500; Referee: Dragan Petrović (Banja Luka) |
