= Vego =

Vego is a surname. Notable people with the surname include:

- Marko Vego (1907–1985), Yugoslav archaeologist, epigrapher, and historian
- Stjepan Vego (born 1997), German and Croatian footballer
