= 2024–25 Miedź Legnica season =

Miedź Legnica
2024–25 season
- Manager: Ireneusz Mamrot
- Stadium: Stadion Miejski w Legnicy
- I liga: 9th
- Polish Cup: Pre-season
- Top goalscorer: League: Wiktor Bogacz; Iwo Kaczmarski (2 each); All: Wiktor Bogacz; Iwo Kaczmarski (2 each)
- Biggest win: Miedź Legnica 4–2 Stal Stalowa Wola
Home colours	Away colours

The 2024–25 season is the 46th season in the history of Miedź Legnica, and the club's second consecutive season in I liga. In addition to the domestic league, the team is scheduled to participate in the Polish Cup.

== Transfers ==
=== In ===
Pos.	Player	Transferred from	Fee	Date	Source
MF	(Poland) Mateusz Bochnak	(Poland) Cracovia	Undisclosed	1 January 2025	
FW	(Sweden) Gustav Engvall	(Sweden) IFK Värnamo	Undisclosed	1 January 2025	

=== Out ===
Pos.	Player	Transferred to	Fee	Date	Source
FW	(Poland) Bartosz Guzdek	(Poland) Wisła Puławy	Loan	25 July 2024	

== Friendlies ==
=== Pre-season ===
3 July 2024 Friendly	Jagiellonia Białystok (Poland)	3–1	(Poland) Miedź Legnica	Opalenica
12:00	Haliti 8'; Hansen 26'; Skrzypczak 53' (pen.)		Kaczmarski 33'	Stadium: Hotel Remes Sport & Spa

12 July 2024 Friendly	Miedź Legnica (Poland)	2–1	(Poland) Zagłębie Sosnowiec	Legnica
18:00				Stadium: Stadion Miejski w Legnicy

13 July 2024 Friendly	Górnik Polkowice (Poland)	0–1	(Poland) Miedź Legnica

== Competitions ==
=== Overall record ===
Competition	First match	Last match	Starting round	Record							
Competition	First match	Last match	Starting round	Pld	W	D	L	GF	GA	GD	Win %
I liga	21 July 2024	25–26 May 2025	Matchday 1	4	2	1	1	7	5	+2	50.00
Polish Cup				0	0	0	0	0	0	+0	—
Total				4	2	1	1	7	5	+2	50.00

Last updated: 10 August 2024
Source: Soccerway

=== I liga ===
==== League table ====
Pos	Team	Pld	W	D	L	GF	GA	GD	Pts	Promotion or Relegation
3	Wisła Płock (O, P)	34	18	10	6	58	38	+20	64	Qualification for the promotion play-offs
4	Wisła Kraków	34	18	8	8	63	32	+31	62	Qualification for the promotion play-offs
5	Miedź Legnica	34	16	8	10	56	45	+11	56 (Note: Ranked based on goal difference: Miedź Legnica +11, Polonia Warsaw +9.)	Qualification for the promotion play-offs
6	Polonia Warsaw	34	16	8	10	46	37	+9	56	Qualification for the promotion play-offs
7	GKS Tychy	34	13	14	7	47	36	+11	53	

Source: 1liga.org, 90minut.pl
Rules for classification: 1) Points; 2) Head-to-head points; 3) Head-to-head goal difference; 4) Goal difference; 6) Goals scored; 7) Number of wins; 8) Number of away wins.
(Note: Head-to-head record is used only after all the matches between the teams in question have been played)
(O) Play-off winner; (P) Promoted
Notes:

Semi-finals; 29 May 2025
3	Wisła Płock	2
6	Polonia Warsaw	1
4	Wisła Kraków	0
5	Miedź Legnica	1

Final; 1 June 2025
3	Wisła Płock	2
5	Miedź Legnica	0

==== Results summary ====
Overall								Home						Away					
Pld	W	D	L	GF	GA	GD	Pts	W	D	L	GF	GA	GD	W	D	L	GF	GA	GD
34	16	8	10	56	45	+11	56	9	3	5	35	27	+8	7	5	5	21	18	+3

Last updated: 25 May 2025.
Source: soccerway

==== Results by round ====
Round	1	2	3	4	5	6	7	8	9	10	11	12	13	14	15	16	17	18	19	20
Ground	A	H	A	H	A	H	A	H	A	H	H	A	H	A	H	A	H	H	A	
Result	D	W	L	W	W	W	D	L	W	W	D	W	W	W	W	D	D	L	W	
Position	7	3	9	7	5	4	5	5	5	3	5	4	4	2	2	2	2	3	3	

Updated to match(es) played on 6 December 2024. Source: worldfootball
A = Away; H = Home; W = Win; D = Draw; L = Loss

==== Matches ====
The match schedule was released on 12 June 2024.

21 July 2024 1	GKS Tychy	2–2	Miedź Legnica	Tychy
14:30	Makowski 57'; Śpiączka 89'		Mioč 35'; Hartherz 85'	Stadium: Tychy Stadium; Attendance: 4,231; Referee: Marcin Kochanek

26 July 2024 2	Miedź Legnica	4–2	Stal Stalowa Wola	Legnica
18:00	Bogacz 7', 18'; Kaczmarski 38', 61'		Jończy 75'; Górski 80'	Stadium: Stadion Miejski w Legnicy; Referee: Grzegorz Kawałko

4 August 2024 3	Stal Rzeszów	1–0	Miedź Legnica	Rzeszów
12:00 UTC+2	Peña 77'		Kwiecień (yellow card) 45+1' (yellow-red card) 88'	Stadium: Stal Rzeszów Municipal Stadium; Referee: Sebastian Jarzębak

10 August 2024 4	Miedź Legnica	1–0	ŁKS Łódź	Legnica
19:35	Mioč 68'			Stadium: Stadion Miejski w Legnicy; Attendance: 3,799; Referee: Mateusz Piszczelok

17 August 2024 5	Polonia Warsaw	0–1	Miedź Legnica	Warsaw
14:30 CEST	Wojciechowski (yellow card) 75'; Terpiłowski (yellow card) 90+1'; Zjawiński (red card) 90+6'	Report	Jacek Podgórski (yellow card) 19'; Kwiecień (yellow card) 44'; Michael Kostka (yellow card) 71'; Antonik (yellow card) 90'; Marcel Mansfeld 90+5'	Stadium: Polonia Warsaw Stadium; Attendance: 1,345; Referee: (Poland) Damian Krumplewski

22 August 2024 6	Miedź Legnica	4–0	Znicz Pruszków	Legnica
17:30 CEST	Drygas 1'; Chuca 9'; Mateusz Grudziński (yellow card) 32'; Mijušković 39'; Bogacz 48' (pen.)	Report	Wiktor Nowak (yellow card) 38'	Stadium: White Eagle Municipal Stadium; Attendance: 3,118; Referee: (Poland) Leszek Lewandowski

30 August 2024 8	Miedź Legnica	1–2	Arka Gdynia	Legnica
20:30 CEST	Mateusz Grudziński 28'; Chuca (yellow card) 48'; Hartherz (yellow card) 90+10'; Kwiecień (yellow card) 90+12'	Report	Czubak 31'; Sobczak 90+11' (pen.)	Stadium: White Eagle Municipal Stadium; Attendance: 4,768; Referee: (Poland) Marcin Kochanek

15 September 2024 9	Górnik Łęczna	1–2	Miedź Legnica	Łęczna
17:00 CEST	Banaszak (yellow card) 17' (goal) 63'; Spáčil (yellow card) 79'	Report	Antonik 22' 27'; Kovačević (yellow card) 40'; Chuca (yellow card) 66'; Bida (yellow card) 71'	Stadium: Łęczna Stadium; Attendance: 1,627; Referee: (Poland) Mateusz Piszczelok

22 September 2024 10	Miedź Legnica	3–0	Ruch Chorzów	Legnica
12:30 CEST	Kaczmarski (yellow card) 20'; Mateusz Grudziński (yellow card) 33'; Kovačević 49'; Mioč 54'; Marcel Mansfeld 87'	Report	Sadlok (yellow card) 65' (yellow-red card) 66'; Lukić (yellow card) 79'	Stadium: White Eagle Municipal Stadium; Attendance: 4,339; Referee: (Poland) Damian Kos

29 September 2024 11	Miedź Legnica	1–1	Kotwica Kołobrzeg	Legnica
17:00 CEST	Marcel Mansfeld 75'; Hartherz (yellow card) 88'; Jacek Podgórski (yellow card) 88'	Report	Segbé 71'; Miłosz Kurowski (yellow card) 90+5'	Stadium: White Eagle Municipal Stadium; Attendance: 3,278; Referee: (Poland) Mateusz Piszczelok

4 October 2024 12	Warta Poznań	1–4	Miedź Legnica	Grodzisk Wielkopolski
18:00	Markov (yellow card) 24'; Rafal Adamski 72'	Report	Antonik 4'; Marcel Mansfeld 17'; Kaczmarski 26'; Michał Kostka 39'	Stadium: Dyskobolia Grodzisk Wielkopolski Stadium; Attendance: 1,014; Referee: (Poland) Sebastian Jarzębak

19 October 2024 13	Miedź Legnica	1–0	Chrobry Głogów	Legnica
17:30 CEST	Kwiecień 27'; Mioč (yellow card) 32'; Letniowski (yellow card) 63'	Report	Bonecki (yellow card) 57'; Szwedzik (yellow card) 83'	Stadium: White Eagle Municipal Stadium; Attendance: 4,481; Referee: (Poland) Marcin Kochanek

26 October 2024 14	Odra Opole	0–2	Miedź Legnica	Opole
14:30 CEST	Purzycki (yellow card) 59'; Szymon Szkliński (yellow card) 64'; Přikryl (yellow card) 83'	Report	Kwiecień 7'; Letniowski (yellow card) 43'; Damian Michalik 80'	Stadium: Itaka Arena; Attendance: 2,146; Referee: (Poland) Sebastian Jarzębak

3 November 2024 15	Miedź Legnica	4–1	Pogoń Siedlce	Legnica
12:00 CET	Drygas 9' 30' (pen.); Mioč 20'; Drina 84'; Kwiecień (yellow card) 87'	Report	Krzyżak (yellow card) 42'; Cássio (yellow card) 46'; Karol Podliński (yellow card) 50'; Dawid Burka 89'	Stadium: White Eagle Municipal Stadium; Attendance: 3,019; Referee: (Poland) Piotr Idzik

9 November 2024 16	Bruk-Bet Termalica Nieciecza	1–1	Miedź Legnica	Nieciecza
19:30 CET	Gabriel Isik (yellow card) 44'; Zaviyskyi (yellow card) 60'; Putivtsev 90+5'	Report	Gabriel Isik 54' (o.g.); Michał Kostka (red card) 64'	Stadium: Stadion Sportowy Bruk-Bet Termalica; Attendance: 2,221; Referee: (Poland) Łukasz Szczech

25 November 2024 17	Miedź Legnica	2–2	Wisła Płock	Legnica
19:00 CET	Hartherz 45'; Kovačević (yellow card) 47' (goal) 52'; Letniowski (yellow card) 59'; Drygas (yellow card) 77'	Report	Sekulski 20'; Haglind-Sangré (yellow card) 43'; Krystian Pomorski 77'; Iban Salvador (red card) 80'; Oskar Tomczyk (yellow card) 82'	Stadium: White Eagle Municipal Stadium; Attendance: 3,267; Referee: (Poland) Damian Kos

30 November 2024	Miedź Legnica	–	GKS Tychy	Legnica
				Stadium: White Eagle Municipal Stadium

6 December 2024	Stal Stalowa Wola	–	Miedź Legnica	Stalowa Wola
				Stadium: Subcarpathian Football Center

12 December 2024	Wisła Kraków	–	Miedź Legnica	Kraków
				Stadium: Henryk Reyman Municipal Stadium
