= Amar Drina =

Bosnian footballer (born 2002)

Personal information
- Date of birth: 30 May 2002 (age 24)
- Place of birth: Sarajevo, Bosnia and Herzegovina
- Height: 1.86 m (6 ft 1 in)
- Position: Centre-back

Youth career
- –2021: Željezničar

Senior career*
Years	Team	Apps	(Gls)
2021–2024	Željezničar	52	(1)
2024–2025	Miedź Legnica	11	(1)
2025–2026	Miedź Legnica II	16	(0)
2026	Riteriai	7	(0)
2026-	Floriana		

International career
2018–2019	Bosnia and Herzegovina U17	12	(0)
2019	Bosnia and Herzegovina U18	2	(0)
2020–2021	Bosnia and Herzegovina U19	7	(0)
2022–2023	Bosnia and Herzegovina U21	5	(0)
- * Club domestic league appearances and goals as of 23:23, 20 June 2026 (UTC)

Amar Drina (born 30 May 2002) is a Bosnian professional footballer who plays as a centre-back.

Born in Sarajevo, he started his professional career at hometown club Željezničar.

== Club career ==
=== Željezničar ===
In July 2021, after passing all the younger levels of hometown club Željezničar, Drina signed his first professional contract. He made his debut in a 3–0 win over Krupa on 30 May 2021.

On 20 June 2022, Drina extended his contract with Željezničar for another three years. He scored his first goal for the club in a 5–0 away win against Zvijezda 09 on 20 May 2024.

Drina terminated his contract with Željezničar and left the club in August 2024.

=== Miedź Legnica ===
Shortly after, on 8 August 2024, Drina signed a three-year deal with Polish second-tier club Miedź Legnica. He left Miedź by mutual consent on 17 December 2025.

== International career ==
Drina has represented Bosnia and Herzegovina at all youth levels.

== Career statistics ==
As of match played 22 November 2025

Appearances and goals by club, season and competition
Club	Season	League			National cup (Note: Includes Bosnia and Herzegovina Cup, Polish Cup)		Europe		Total	
Club	Season	Division	Apps	Goals	Apps	Goals	Apps	Goals	Apps	Goals
Željezničar	2020–21	Bosnian Premier League	1	0	—		—		1	0
Željezničar	2021–22	Bosnian Premier League	15	0	1	0	—		16	0
Željezničar	2022–23	Bosnian Premier League	24	0	4	0	—		28	0
Željezničar	2023–24	Bosnian Premier League	12	1	1	0	3 (Note: Appearances in UEFA Conference League)	0	16	1
Željezničar	Total		52	1	6	0	3	0	61	1
Miedź Legnica	2024–25	I liga	11	1	0	0	—		11	1
Miedź Legnica II	2025–26	III liga, group III	16	0	1	0	—		17	0
Career total			79	2	7	0	3	0	89	2

== Honours ==
Miedź Legnica II

- Lower Silesia Super Cup: 2025
