= Nermin Bašić =

Bosnian football manager (born 1983)

Personal information
- Date of birth: 24 November 1983 (age 42)
- Place of birth: Travnik, Yugoslavia

Managerial career
- Years: Team
- 2011: Travnik (caretaker)
- 2012–2013: Travnik
- 2013: Travnik
- 2013–2016: Metalleghe-BSI
- 2017: Sloga Simin Han
- 2017–2019: Radomlje
- 2019: Gorica
- 2020: Tuzla City
- 2021–2022: Radomlje
- 2023: Željezničar

Nermin Bašić (born 24 November 1983) is a Bosnian professional football manager. He is the youngest ever manager that has managed in the Bosnian Premier League, and is the third youngest Bosnian manager to obtain a UEFA Pro Licence.

During his career, Bašić managed Bosnian clubs Travnik, Metalleghe-BSI, Tuzla City and Željezničar, and Slovenian clubs Radomlje and Gorica.

== Career ==
=== Travnik ===
Bašić started his managerial career very early as a 27 year old. Back then he was caretaker manager of Travnik.

He was then named assistant manager of Travnik after Haris Jaganjac was named manager. After Jaganjac got sacked, Bašić stayed as the assistant manager, this time to Husnija Arapović. After Arapović left the club, on 28 June 2012, Bašić was named the new manager of Travnik.

In January 2013 he left Travnik, but only three months later, on 22 April 2013, Bašić was once again named Travnik's manager. In June 2013, Bašić again left Travnik after, this time, a successful season.

=== Metalleghe-BSI ===
On 29 November 2013, Bašić became the new manager of Metalleghe-BSI. In late May 2014, Bašić won the Second League of FBiH with Metalleghe and got them promoted to the 2014–15 First League of FBiH season.

In May 2016, Bašić with Metalleghe made history, winning the 2015–16 season of the First League of FBiH and getting promotion to the 2016–17 Bosnian Premier League season. On 8 November 2016, he left Metalleghe after a poor start to the season.

=== Sloga Simin Han ===
On 8 January 2017, Bašić became the new manager of Sloga Simin Han. When he was appointed manager, Sloga was fighting to avoid relegation, whilst by the end of the season, they fought for the title and to get promoted to the Premier League. He left the club in June 2017.

=== Radomlje ===
On 16 June 2017, Bašić was named as the new manager of Slovenian Second League club Radomlje. With Radomlje he made a fantastic result in November 2018, as the club finished in 1st place after the autumn part of the 2018–19 Slovenian Second League season.

On 4 January 2019, during the winter break of the season, Bašić left Radomlje so that he could become the new manager of Slovenian PrvaLiga club Gorica.

=== Gorica ===
On 5 January 2019, Bašić was named as the new manager of Slovenian PrvaLiga club Gorica. He made his debut for Gorica as the club's manager in a 4–3 loss against Celje on 23 February 2019.

His first win as Gorica's manager came on 17 March 2019, in a 2–1 home win against Domžale.

After a string of poor results, which culminated on 11 April 2019 with a 3–1 away loss against Aluminij, Bašić was sacked.

=== Return to Tuzla City ===
On 19 October 2020, Bašić returned to Tuzla City (previously known as Sloga Simin Han), signing a contract with the club until December 2020 with an option to extend it. In his first game since his return to the club as a manager, he led his team to a 2020–21 Bosnian Cup second round win against Radnik Bijeljina.

Bašić suffered his first loss as Tuzla City manager on 28 November 2020, in a league match against Olimpik. He left the club in December 2020 after his contract expired.

=== Return to Radomlje ===
In June 2021, Bašić returned to Radomlje in the role of team manager. On 29 December 2021, he was named as Radomlje's head coach, replacing Rok Hanžič.

Despite a positive start to the 2022–23 season, Bašić's side started to struggle and suffered a 7–0 defeat away to Maribor on 6 December 2022. On 9 December, Radomlje and Bašić parted ways, mutually terminanting his contract.

=== Željezničar ===
On 12 April 2023, Bašić was appointed manager of Željezničar, replacing Edis Mulalić. Two days later, he managed his first Željezničar match against Zrinjski Mostar, losing 2–0 away from home. On 22 April, he secured his first win as Željezničar manager against Široki Brijeg.

In Bašić's first Sarajevo derby, Sulejman Krpić scored the equaliser in the sixth minute of stoppage time against rivals Sarajevo, helping his team to narrowly avoid defeat in a 2–2 draw on 12 May 2023. Željezničar finished the 2022–23 season in third place, securing a place in the 2023–24 UEFA Europa Conference League first qualifying round.

On 12 June 2023, Bašić signed a new two-year contract, with an option to stay at the club until at least 2026. Željezničar eliminated Belarusian side Dinamo Minsk in the Europa Conference League first qualifying round, before getting eliminated by Azerbaijani club Neftçi in the second qualifying round.

Early on in the 2023–24 season, Željezničar suffered five defeats in a row, including an early exit from the Bosnian Cup. On 2 October 2023, after a home win over Široki Brijeg, Bašić surprisingly offered his resignation as manager, citing "poor results prior to this game", but this was hastily rejected by the club's board. On 1 November 2023, following an away loss against Igman Konjic, which was the club's seventh defeat in nine league games, Bašić left Željezničar by mutual consent.

== Managerial statistics ==
As of match played 27 October 2023

Managerial record by team and tenure
Team	From	To	Record				
Team	From	To	G	W	D	L	Win %
Travnik (caretaker)	30 September 2011	10 October 2011	1	1	0	0	100.00
Travnik	28 June 2012	14 January 2013	16	3	5	8	18.75
Travnik	22 April 2013	30 June 2013	7	3	2	2	42.86
Metalleghe-BSI	29 November 2013	8 November 2016	79	37	16	26	46.84
Sloga Simin Han	8 January 2017	4 June 2017	15	9	2	4	60.00
Radomlje	16 June 2017	4 January 2019	48	28	9	11	58.33
Gorica	5 January 2019	12 April 2019	7	1	1	5	14.29
Tuzla City	19 October 2020	31 December 2020	9	4	2	3	44.44
Radomlje	29 December 2021	9 December 2022	37	10	13	14	27.03
Željezničar	12 April 2023	1 November 2023	26	10	4	12	38.46
Total			245	106	54	85	43.27

== Honours ==
Metalleghe-BSI

- First League of FBiH: 2015–16
- Second League of FBiH: 2013–14 (West)
