= Irfan Jašarević =

Bosnian footballer (born 1995)

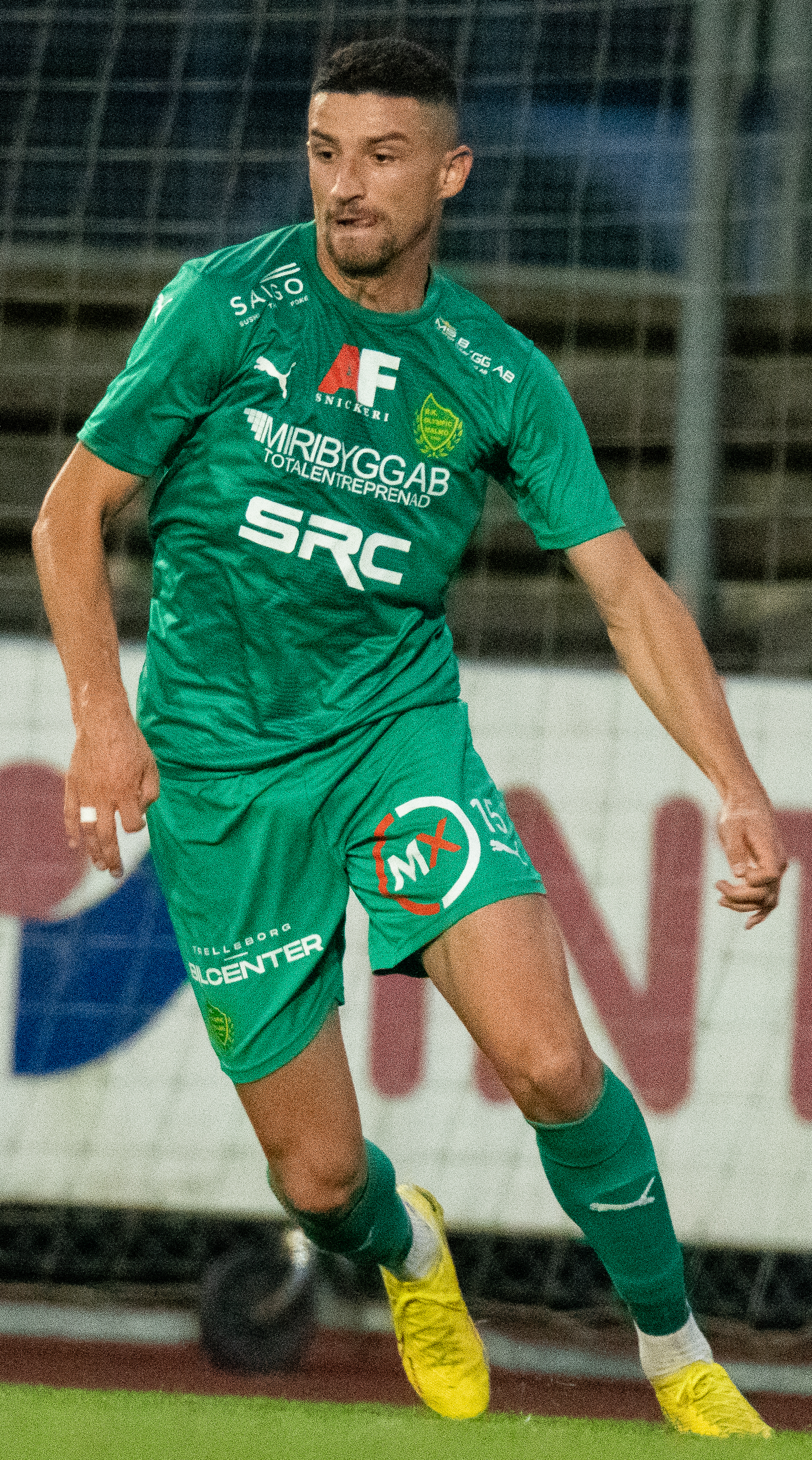
- Jašarević playing for BK Olympic in 2022

Personal information
- Date of birth: 24 August 1995 (age 31)
- Place of birth: Vitez, Bosnia and Herzegovina
- Height: 1.78 m (5 ft 10 in)
- Position: Left-back

Team information
- Current team: Vitez
- Number: 10

Youth career
- Vitez

Senior career*
Years	Team	Apps	(Gls)
2014–2016	Travnik	41	(1)
2016–2018	Krupa	43	(3)
2018–2021	Dalkurd FF	56	(5)
2022	BK Olympic	26	(3)
2023–2024	Željezničar	24	(2)
2024	Tuzla City	13	(0)
2025	Sloboda Tuzla	12	(0)
2025–	Vitez	10	(1)
- * Club domestic league appearances and goals as of 22 March 2026

Irfan Jašarević (born 24 August 1995) is a Bosnian professional footballer who plays as a left-back for First League of FBiH club Vitez.

== Career statistics ==
=== Club ===
As of match played 24 November 2024

Club	Season	League			Cup		Continental		Total	
Club	Season	Division	Apps	Goals	Apps	Goals	Apps	Goals	Apps	Goals
Travnik	2014–15	Bosnian Premier League	16	1	1	0	–		17	1
Travnik	2015–16	Bosnian Premier League	25	0	2	0	–		27	0
Travnik	Total		41	1	3	0	–		44	1
Krupa	2016–17	Bosnian Premier League	27	1	0	0	–		27	1
Krupa	2017–18	Bosnian Premier League	16	2	3	0	–		19	2
Krupa	Total		43	3	3	0	–		46	3
Dalkurd FF	2018	Allsvenskan	8	0	1	0	–		9	0
Dalkurd FF	2019	Superettan	20	1	4	0	–		24	1
Dalkurd FF	2020	Superettan	19	2	3	0	–		22	2
Dalkurd FF	2021	Ettan	9	2	0	0	–		9	2
Dalkurd FF	Total		56	5	8	0	–		64	5
BK Olympic	2022	Ettan	26	3	0	0	–		26	3
Željezničar	2022–23	Bosnian Premier League	12	1	5	0	–		17	1
Željezničar	2023–24	Bosnian Premier League	12	1	1	0	4	0	17	1
Željezničar	Total		24	2	6	0	4	0	34	2
Tuzla City	2023–24	Bosnian Premier League	4	0	1	0	–		5	0
Tuzla City	2024–25	First League of FBiH	9	0	–		–		9	0
Tuzla City	Total		13	0	1	0	–		14	0
Career total			203	14	21	0	4	0	228	14
