= Bartosz Kwiecień =

Polish footballer

Personal information
- Date of birth: 7 May 1994 (age 32)
- Place of birth: Starachowice, Poland
- Height: 1.89 m (6 ft 2 in)
- Positions: Centre-back; defensive midfielder

Team information
- Current team: Stal Mielec
- Number: 94

Youth career
- 2002–2010: Juventa Starachowice

Senior career*
Years	Team	Apps	(Gls)
2010–2012	Juventa Starachowice	39	(1)
2013–2017	Korona Kielce	19	(0)
2013–2016	Korona Kielce II	23	(0)
2014	→ Górnik Łęczna (loan)	7	(0)
2016	→ Chrobry Głogów (loan)	16	(3)
2017–2022	Jagiellonia Białystok	77	(5)
2020–2021	→ Arka Gdynia (loan)	14	(0)
2022	Resovia	16	(2)
2023–2024	Korona Kielce	19	(1)
2023	Korona Kielce II	3	(0)
2024–2026	Miedź Legnica	49	(4)
2026–	Stal Mielec	0	(0)

International career
2013	Poland U19	2	(0)
- * Club domestic league appearances and goals as of 15:15, 29 May 2026 (UTC)

Bartosz Kwiecień (born 7 May 1994) is a Polish professional footballer who plays as a centre-back or defensive midfielder for I liga club Stal Mielec.

== Career ==
=== Jagiellonia Białystok ===
On 27 July 2017, Kwiecień signed a four-year contract with Jagiellonia Białystok. He debuted for Jagiellonia on 17 July 2017 against Zagłębie Lubin. He scored his first goal for the club on 12 December 2017 against Korona Kielce in a 5–1 victory.

==== Loan to Arka Gdynia ====
On 5 August 2020, he was loaned to Arka Gdynia.

== Career statistics ==
As of match played 24 May 2026

Appearances and goals by club, season and competition
Club	Season	League			Polish Cup		Europe		Other		Total	
Club	Season	Division	Apps	Goals	Apps	Goals	Apps	Goals	Apps	Goals	Apps	Goals
Juventa Starachowice	2010–11	III liga, gr. G	7	0	—		—		—		7	0
Juventa Starachowice	2011–12	III liga, gr. G	21	0	—		—		—		21	0
Juventa Starachowice	2012–13	III liga, gr. G	11	1	—		—		—		11	1
Juventa Starachowice	Total		39	1	—		—		—		39	1
Korona Kielce	2012–13	Ekstraklasa	3	0	0	0	—		—		3	0
Korona Kielce	2013–14	Ekstraklasa	4	0	1	0	—		—		5	0
Korona Kielce	2014–15	Ekstraklasa	2	0	0	0	—		—		2	0
Korona Kielce	2015–16	Ekstraklasa	0	0	0	0	—		—		0	0
Korona Kielce	2016–17	Ekstraklasa	9	0	0	0	—		—		9	0
Korona Kielce	2017–18	Ekstraklasa	1	0	0	0	—		—		1	0
Korona Kielce	Total		19	0	1	0	—		—		20	0
Korona Kielce II	2013–14	III liga, gr. G	5	0	—		—		—		5	0
Korona Kielce II	2014–15	III liga, gr. G	8	0	—		—		—		8	0
Korona Kielce II	2015–16	III liga, gr. G	10	0	—		—		—		8	0
Korona Kielce II	Total		23	0	—		—		—		23	0
Górnik Łęczna (loan)	2013–14	I liga	7	0	—		—		—		7	0
Chrobry Głogów (loan)	2016–17	I liga	16	3	0	0	—		—		16	3
Jagiellonia Białystok	2017–18	Ekstraklasa	18	3	1	0	—		—		19	3
Jagiellonia Białystok	2018–19	Ekstraklasa	27	1	3	0	4 (Note: Appearances in UEFA Europa League)	0	—		34	1
Jagiellonia Białystok	2019–20	Ekstraklasa	13	1	1	0	—		—		14	1
Jagiellonia Białystok	2020–21	Ekstraklasa	12	0	—		—		—		12	0
Jagiellonia Białystok	2021–22	Ekstraklasa	7	0	0	0	—		—		7	0
Jagiellonia Białystok	Total		77	5	5	0	4	0	—		86	5
Arka Gdynia (loan)	2020–21	I liga	14	0	1	0	—		—		15	0
Resovia	2021–22	I liga	2	0	—		—		—		2	0
Resovia	2022–23	I liga	14	2	2	1	—		—		16	3
Resovia	Total		16	2	2	1	—		—		18	3
Korona Kielce	2022–23	Ekstraklasa	5	0	—		—		—		5	0
Korona Kielce	2023–24	Ekstraklasa	14	1	2	0	—		—		16	1
Korona Kielce	Total		19	1	2	0	—		—		21	1
Korona Kielce II	2022–23	III liga, gr. IV	1	0	—		—		—		1	0
Korona Kielce II	2023–24	IV liga Holy Cross	2	0	—		—		—		2	0
Korona Kielce II	Total		3	0	—		—		—		3	0
Miedź Legnica	2024–25	I liga	26	2	0	0	—		2 (Note: Appearances in I liga promotion play-offs)	0	28	2
Miedź Legnica	2025–26	I liga	21	2	2	0	—		—		23	2
Miedź Legnica	Total		47	4	2	0	—		2	0	51	4
Stal Mielec	2026–27	I liga	0	0	0	0	—		—		0	0
Career total			280	16	13	1	4	0	2	0	299	17

== Honours ==
Korona Kielce II

- IV liga Świętokrzyskie: 2023–24
