= Clarismario Santos =

Brazilian footballer (born 2001)

Personal information
- Full name: Clarismario Santos Rodrigues
- Date of birth: 27 July 2001 (age 25)
- Place of birth: Valente, Brazil
- Height: 1.77 m (5 ft 10 in)
- Position: Left winger

Team information
- Current team: Melbourne Victory
- Number: 11

Senior career*
Years	Team	Apps	(Gls)
2019	Fluminense-BA		
2019–2020	Dubrava	10	(0)
2020–2021	Borac Kozarska Dubica	15	(2)
2021–2022	Rudar Prijedor	43	(6)
2022–2023	Željezničar	30	(8)
2023–2024	AEK Larnaca	26	(1)
2024–	Melbourne Victory	51	(10)
- * Club domestic league appearances and goals as of 09:28, 26 January 2026 (UTC)

Clarismario Santos Rodrigues (Brazilian Portuguese: [klaɾisˈmaɾju ˈsɐ̃tus ʁoˈdɾiɡis]; born 27 July 2001), known mononymously as Santos, is a Brazilian professional footballer who plays as a left winger for A-League club Melbourne Victory.

== Career ==
=== Rudar Prijedor ===
In January 2021, Santos signed with Bosnian club Rudar Prijedor. He made his debut in a 2–1 loss against Željezničar Banja Luka on 6 March 2021. He left the club in June 2022.

=== Željezničar ===
On 8 June 2022, Santos signed with Bosnian Premier League club Željezničar. He made his debut in a 1–1 draw against Leotar on 16 July 2022. He scored his first goal for the club in a league game against Široki Brijeg on 31 July.

In June 2023, Santos left Željezničar after his contract with the club expired.

=== AEK Larnaca ===
On 25 July 2023, Santos joined Cypriot First Division side AEK Larnaca on a two-year deal, with an option to stay at the club until at least 2026. He debuted in a league win over Doxa on 2 September 2023. He scored his first goal for the club in a 1–0 away win over Nea Salamina on 12 January 2024.

== Career statistics ==
=== Club ===
As of match played 30 June 2026

Appearances and goals by club, season and competition
Club	Season	League	League		National cup (Note: Includes Bosnian Cup, Cypriot Cup, Australia Cup)		Continental		Other		Total	
Club	Season	League	Apps	Goals	Apps	Goals	Apps	Goals	Apps	Goals	Apps	Goals
Dubrava	2019–20	Druga HNL	10	0	–		–		–		10	0
Borac Kozarska Dubica	2020–21	First League of RS	15	2	–		–		–		15	2
Rudar Prijedor	2020–21	First League of RS	14	5	–		–		–		14	5
Rudar Prijedor	2021–22	Bosnian Premier League	29	1	–		–		–		29	1
Rudar Prijedor	Total		43	6	–		–		–		43	6
Željezničar	2022–23	Bosnian Premier League	30	8	5	0	–		–		35	8
AEK Larnaca	2023–24	Cypriot First Division	26	1	3	1	–		–		29	2
AEK Larnaca	2024–25	Cypriot First Division	–		–		2 (Note: Appearances in UEFA Conference League)	0	–		2	0
AEK Larnaca	Total		26	1	3	1	2	0	–		31	2
Melbourne Victory	2024–25	A-League Men	20	4	–		–		4 (Note: Appearances in A-League Men finals)	0	24	4
Melbourne Victory	2025–26	A-League Men	24	6	1	0	–		1 (Note: Appearances in A-League Men finals)	0	26	6
Melbourne Victory	Total		44	10	1	0	–		5	0	50	10
Career total			168	28	9	1	2	0	0	0	184	28

== Honours ==
Rudar Prijedor

- First League of RS: 2020–21
