= Samir Bekrić =

Bosnian footballer (born 1984)

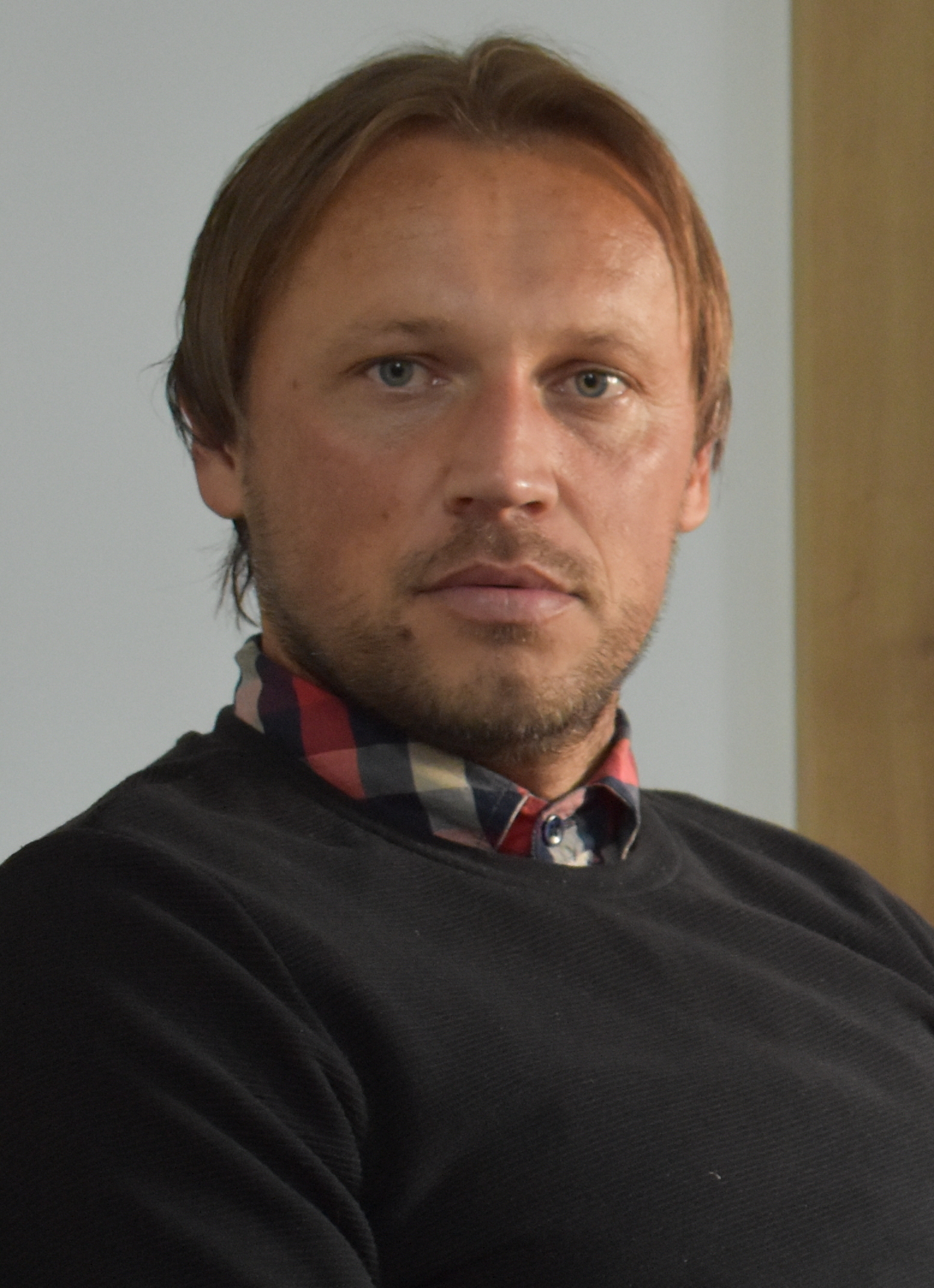
- Bekrić in 2021

Personal information
- Date of birth: 20 October 1984 (age 42)
- Place of birth: Tuzla, SFR Yugoslavia
- Height: 1.78 m (5 ft 10 in)
- Position: Midfielder

Youth career
- –2003: Gradina

Senior career*
Years	Team	Apps	(Gls)
2003–2006	Gradina		
2007–2010	Željezničar	96	(23)
2010	Incheon United	16	(2)
2011	Tobol	29	(7)
2012–2013	Željezničar	31	(8)
2013	Mes Kerman	13	(1)
2013–2014	Fajr Sepasi	13	(2)
2014–2015	Bunyodkor	24	(1)
2016–2018	Željezničar	31	(6)
2018–2019	Zrinjski Mostar	29	(3)
2019–2020	Sloboda Tuzla	21	(4)
2020–2023	Željezničar	69	(6)
Total		372	(63)

International career
2009	Bosnia and Herzegovina	1	(0)
- * Club domestic league appearances and goals

Samir Bekrić (born 20 October 1984) is a Bosnian football executive and former player who played as a midfielder.

== Club career ==
=== Early career ===
Bekrić started his professional career in 2003 joining Gradina. He stayed at Gradina until 2006.

=== Željezničar ===
In January 2007, Bekrić joined Željezničar. In the 2009–10 season, Bekrić was one of the best players of Željezničar, scoring 15 goals. He also had 13 assists. That season he won the Bosnian Premier League with the club.

=== South Korea and Kazakhstan ===
After a successful period at Željezničar, Bekrić had stints in South Korea with Incheon United and in Kazakhstan with Tobol.

=== Return to Željezničar ===
In February 2012, Bekrić came back to Željezničar and that same year won the league title and the Bosnian Cup. In 2013, he again won the league title with Željezničar. Bekrić left the club that year.

=== Iran ===
In 2013, Bekrić went to Iran and stayed there until 2014. While there, he played for Mes Kerman and Fajr Sepasi.

=== Bunyodkor ===
In July 2014, Bekrić joined Uzbekistan Super League club Bunyodkor. He played for the club until late 2015.

=== Second return to Željezničar ===
On 14 January 2016, Bekrić, for a second time, came back to Željezničar and played at the club until he left it in January 2018.

=== Zrinjski Mostar ===
On 19 February 2018, Bekrić signed with Zrinjski Mostar. In May 2018, he won the league with Zrinjski. On 20 June 2019, Bekrić left Zrinjski after his contract with the club expired.

=== Sloboda Tuzla ===
On 9 July 2019, Bekrić signed a two-year contract with Sloboda Tuzla. He made his official debut for Sloboda on 21 July 2019, in a 2–1 home-league win against Radnik Bijeljina. Bekrić scored his first official goal for Sloboda on 17 August 2019, in a 2–2 away league draw against his former club Željezničar. He left the club after his contract expired on 22 June 2020.

=== Third return to Željezničar ===
Five days after leaving Sloboda, on 27 June 2020, Bekrić returned to Željezničar for a third time and signed a one-year contract with the club. He played his first official game since his return on 1 August 2020, a league match against Velež Mostar.

Bekrić made his 200th appearance for Željezničar on 30 September 2020, in a cup game against Budućnost Banovići. He scored his first goal for the club since his return in a league match against Tuzla City on 5 October 2020.

On 4 June 2021, Bekrić extended his contract with Željezničar. On 26 August 2022, he scored the equaliser 6 minutes into stoppage time against rivals Sarajevo in the Sarajevo derby, helping his team to narrowly escape defeat in a 2–2 draw.

On 7 December 2022, Bekrić announced that he would retire at the end of the 2022–23 season. His last appearance for Željezničar, and his last game as an active player, was a 3–0 home win against Posušje on 21 May 2023. Bekrić was given a standing ovation by the fans during and following the game itself.

== International career ==
Bekrić made his debut for Bosnia and Herzegovina in a June 2009 friendly game against Uzbekistan, coming on as a late substitute for Velibor Đurić. It remained his sole international appearance.

== Executive career ==
During the 2022–23 season, his last as an active player for Željezničar, Bekrić had taken up the role of sporting director. On 2 June 2023, following the end of the season, he was officially named as Željezničar's new sporting director, being responsible for the club's major transfer market decisions. In April 2024, Bekrić moved to the role of team manager. In July 2024, he was appointed coordinator of Željezničar's youth school. He left the post in July 2026.

== Career statistics ==
=== International ===
Appearances and goals by national team and year
National team	Year	Apps	Goals
Bosnia and Herzegovina	2009	1	0
Total		1	0

== Honours ==
Željezničar

- Bosnian Premier League: 2009–10, 2011–12, 2012–13
- Bosnian Cup: 2011–12

Zrinjski Mostar

- Bosnian Premier League: 2017–18
