= Juliusz Letniowski =

Polish footballer

Personal information
- Date of birth: 8 April 1998 (age 28)
- Place of birth: Gdańsk, Poland
- Height: 1.83 m (6 ft 0 in)
- Position: Midfielder

Team information
- Current team: Miedź Legnica
- Number: 10

Youth career
- Lechia Gdańsk

Senior career*
Years	Team	Apps	(Gls)
2015–2017	Lechia Gdańsk II	26	(5)
2016–2017	→ Bytovia Bytów (loan)	3	(0)
2017–2018	Bałtyk Gdynia	31	(10)
2018	Bytovia Bytów	19	(7)
2019–2022	Lech Poznań	5	(0)
2019–2020	Lech Poznań II	15	(5)
2020–2021	→ Arka Gdynia (loan)	26	(10)
2021–2022	→ Widzew Łódź (loan)	16	(3)
2022–2024	Widzew Łódź	31	(1)
2023–2024	→ Ruch Chorzów (loan)	23	(1)
2024–	Miedź Legnica	39	(2)

International career
2016	Poland U18	3	(0)
- * Club domestic league appearances and goals as of 15:18, 29 May 2026 (UTC)

Juliusz Letniowski (born 8 April 1998) is a Polish professional footballer who plays as a midfielder for I liga club Miedź Legnica.

== Club career ==
In 2016, Letniowski was sent on loan from Lechia Gdańsk to Bytovia Bytów.

On 27 July 2020, he joined Arka Gdynia on loan.

Having spent the 2021–22 season on loan at Widzew Łódź, he joined the club on a permanent basis on 30 June 2022, signing a two-year contract with an extension option.

On 31 May 2024, after his loan spell with Ruch Chorzów had concluded, Letniowski signed a three-year contract with I liga club Miedź Legnica.

== Career statistics ==
As of match played 24 May 2026

Appearances and goals by club, season and competition
Club	Season	League			Polish Cup		Continental		Other		Total	
Club	Season	Division	Apps	Goals	Apps	Goals	Apps	Goals	Apps	Goals	Apps	Goals
Lechia Gdańsk II	2014–15	III liga, gr. D	3	0	—		—		—		3	0
Lechia Gdańsk II	2015–16	III liga, gr. D	23	5	—		—		—		23	5
Lechia Gdańsk II	Total		26	5	—		—		—		26	5
Bytovia Bytów (loan)	2016–17	I liga	3	0	0	0	—		—		3	0
Bałtyk Gdynia	2017–18	III liga, gr. II	31	10	—		—		—		31	10
Bytovia Bytów	2018–19	I liga	19	7	2	0	—		—		21	7
Lech Poznań	2018–19	Ekstraklasa	0	0	0	0	—		—		0	0
Lech Poznań	2019–20	Ekstraklasa	5	0	1	0	—		—		6	0
Lech Poznań	Total		5	0	1	0	—		—		6	0
Lech Poznań II	2019–20	II liga	15	5	—		—		—		15	5
Arka Gdynia (loan)	2020–21	I liga	26	10	3	2	—		—		29	12
Widzew Łódź (loan)	2021–22	I liga	16	3	1	0	—		—		17	3
Widzew Łódź	2022–23	Ekstraklasa	31	1	1	0	—		—		32	1
Ruch Chorzów (loan)	2023–24	Ekstraklasa	23	1	1	0	—		—		24	1
Miedź Legnica	2024–25	I liga	18	2	2	1	—		2 (Note: Appearances in I liga promotion play-offs)	0	22	3
Miedź Legnica	2025–26	I liga	19	0	1	0	—		—		20	0
Miedź Legnica	Total		37	2	3	1	—		2	0	42	3
Career total			232	44	12	3	—		2	0	246	47

== Honours ==
Individual

- I liga Player of the Month: September 2021
