= Armin Hodžić (footballer, born 2000) =

Bosnian footballer (born 2000)

Personal information
- Date of birth: 29 February 2000 (age 26)
- Place of birth: Tuzla, Bosnia and Herzegovina
- Height: 1.88 m (6 ft 2 in)
- Position: Central midfielder

Team information
- Current team: Željezničar
- Number: 55

Youth career
- –2019: Sloboda Tuzla

Senior career*
Years	Team	Apps	(Gls)
2018–2020	Sloboda Tuzla	21	(1)
2020–2021	Alcorcón	0	(0)
2020–2021	→ Estoril (loan)	1	(0)
2022–2023	Željezničar	42	(8)
2023–2025	Hatayspor	34	(1)
2024–2025	→ Manisa (loan)	10	(1)
2026–	Željezničar	2	(0)

International career
2022	Bosnia and Herzegovina U21	2	(0)
- * Club domestic league appearances and goals as of 7 March 2026

Armin Hodžić (born 29 February 2000) is a Bosnian professional footballer who plays as a central midfielder for Bosnian Premier League club Željezničar.

He started his professional career at Sloboda Tuzla, before joining Alcorcón in 2020, who loaned him to Estoril. Hodžić signed with Željezničar in 2022. He joined Turkish side Hatayspor in 2023, who then loaned him out to Manisa one year later. Hodžić returned to Željezničar in 2026.

== Club career ==
Born in Tuzla, Hodžić started playing football at his hometown club Sloboda. He made his debut on 3 March 2018, coming on as a late substitute in a 1–1 home draw against Borac Banja Luka. Rarely used during his first two seasons, Hodžić started to feature more regularly during the 2019–20 season. He scored his first goal for Sloboda on 17 August 2019, netting the equalizer in a 2–2 away draw against Željezničar.

On 5 October 2020, Hodžić signed for Spanish Segunda División club Alcorcón. Two days later, however, he was loaned to Liga Portugal 2 side Estoril. Hodžić made his debut in a 1–1 home draw against Porto B on 21 December 2020.

On 28 February 2022, Hodžić joined Željezničar in a free transfer. He made his debut and scored his first goal for the club on 5 March 2022, in the Sarajevo derby against FK Sarajevo. Hodžić left Željezničar after his contract with the club expired in June 2023. In July 2023, he signed a three-year contract with Hatayspor in Turkey.

In February 2026, Hodžić returned to Željezničar on a two-and-a-half-year deal. On 7 March 2026, he injured his anterior cruciate ligament in a league game against Sloga Doboj, ruling him out for at least six months.

== International career ==
Hodžić was a member of the Bosnia and Herzegovina national under-21 team, making two appearances.

== Career statistics ==
=== Club ===
As of match played 7 March 2026

Appearances and goals by club, season and competition
Club	Season	League			National cup (Note: Includes Bosnian Cup, Turkish Cup)		Continental		Total	
Club	Season	Division	Apps	Goals	Apps	Goals	Apps	Goals	Apps	Goals
Sloboda Tuzla	2017–18	Bosnian Premier League	3	0	0	0	—		3	0
Sloboda Tuzla	2018–19	Bosnian Premier League	5	0	0	0	—		5	0
Sloboda Tuzla	2019–20	Bosnian Premier League	13	1	2	0	—		15	1
Sloboda Tuzla	Total		21	1	2	0	—		23	1
Estoril (loan)	2020–21	Liga Portugal 2	1	0	0	0	—		1	0
Željezničar	2021–22	Bosnian Premier League	13	3	—		—		13	3
Željezničar	2022–23	Bosnian Premier League	29	5	4	0	—		33	5
Željezničar	Total		42	8	4	0	—		46	8
Hatayspor	2023–24	Süper Lig	21	1	4	2	—		25	3
Hatayspor	2024–25	Süper Lig	4	0	0	0	—		4	0
Hatayspor	2025–26	1. Lig	9	0	0	0	—		9	0
Hatayspor	Total		34	1	4	2	—		38	3
Manisa (loan)	2024–25	1. Lig	10	1	0	0	—		10	1
Željezničar	2025–26	Bosnian Premier League	2	0	0	0	—		2	0
Career total			110	11	10	2	—		120	13

== Honours ==
Estoril

- Liga Portugal 2: 2020–21
