= Wiktor Bogacz =

Polish footballer (born 2004)

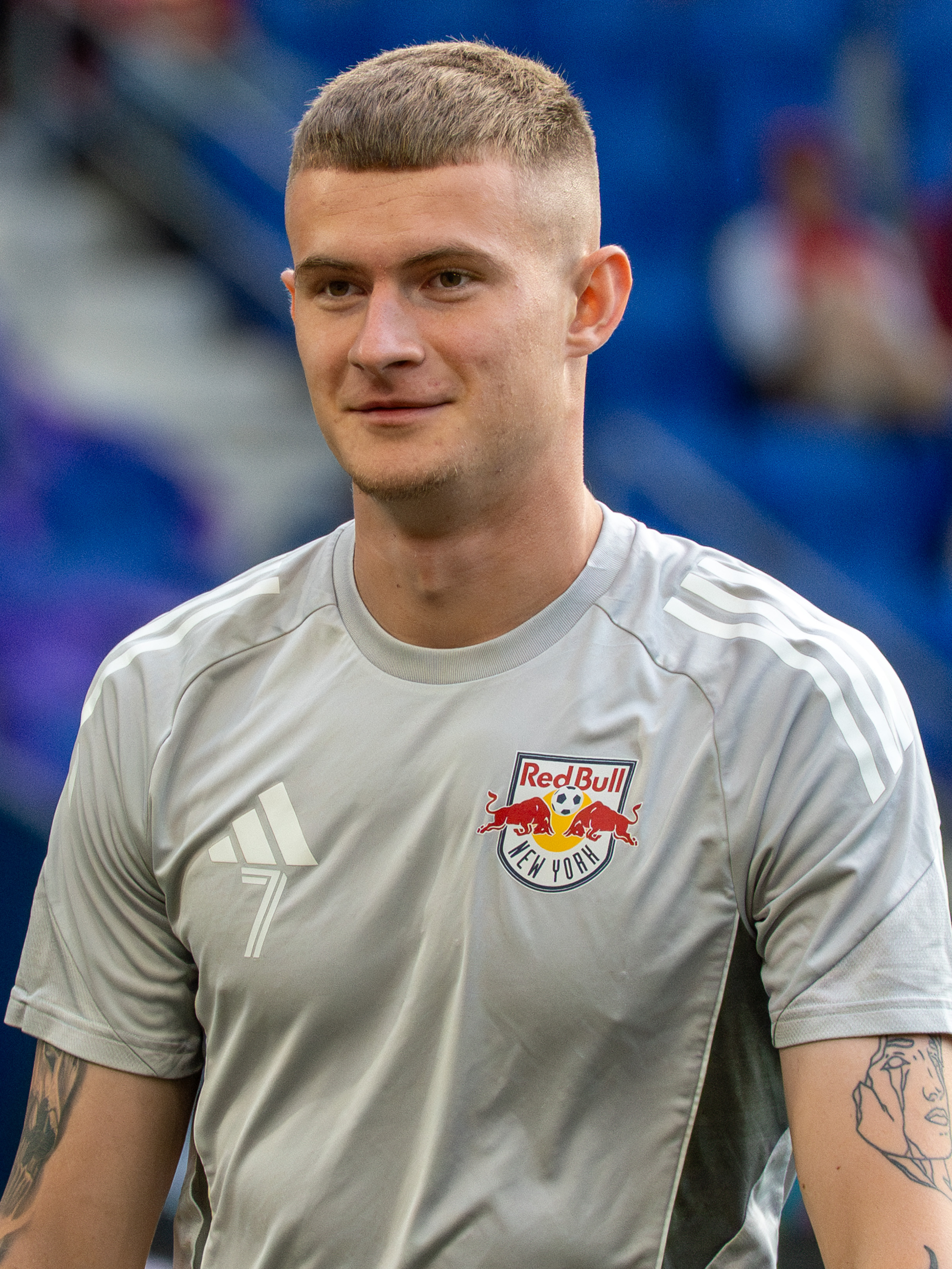
- Bogacz in 2025 with New York Red Bulls

Personal information
- Full name: Wiktor Bogacz
- Date of birth: 14 July 2004 (age 22)
- Place of birth: Starachowice, Poland
- Height: 1.93 m (6 ft 4 in)
- Position: Forward

Team information
- Current team: Cracovia (on loan from New York Red Bulls)
- Number: 9

Youth career
- 2012–2016: Juventa Starachowice
- 2016–2020: Delta Warsaw
- 2020–2021: Miedź Legnica

Senior career*
Years	Team	Apps	(Gls)
2021–2023	Miedź Legnica II	19	(6)
2023–2025	Miedź Legnica	25	(8)
2025–	New York Red Bulls	19	(1)
2025–	New York Red Bulls II	2	(2)
2026–	→ Cracovia (loan)	1	(0)
2026–	→ Cracovia II (loan)	2	(0)

International career^{‡}
2025	Poland U21	6	(2)
- * Club domestic league appearances and goals as of 17:07, 4 June 2026 (UTC) ‡ National team caps and goals as of 21:35, 18 November 2025 (UTC)

Wiktor Bogacz (born 14 July 2004) is a Polish professional footballer who plays as a forward for Ekstraklasa club Cracovia, on loan from Major League Soccer club New York Red Bulls.

== Club career ==
=== Miedź Legnica ===
Born in Starachowice, Bogacz joined Miedź Legnica's youth setup in 2020 from Delta Warsaw. In September 2021, Bogacz was given the opportunity to train with the first team of Miedź Legnica due to his performances with the youth teams.

He was registered with the first team on 6 April 2023. On 24 April 2024, he scored his first goal for Miedź in a 2–1 loss to Wisła Płock in a I liga match. Bogacz finished the season with 5 goals in 14 matches.

On 26 July 2024, Bogacz scored his first two goals of the 2024–25 season in a 4–2 victory over Stal Stalowa Wola. A few days later, on 29 July 2024, it was reported by TVP Sport in Poland that Serie A club Juventus were in talks to acquire Bogacz. On 13 August, after receiving an offer from Major League Soccer club New York Red Bulls, Bogacz released a statement on Miedź's official website announcing his decision to stay, stating it was "simply too early" for him to move abroad and that "there will be time to sign big contracts" later in his career.

=== New York Red Bulls ===
On 7 January 2025, it was announced that Bogacz was sold to New York Red Bulls for an undisclosed transfer fee, signing a four-year contract, occupying a U22 Initiative roster slot. During the early part of the season, Bogacz was sent on loan to affiliate club New York Red Bulls II. On 30 March 2025, Bogacz made his debut for the side, appearing as a starter and scoring in a 3–2 victory over local rival New York City FC II. On 28 May 2025, Bogacz scored his first league goal in his first league start for New York Red Bulls in a 4–2 victory over Charlotte FC.

==== Loan to Cracovia ====
On 10 February 2026, Bogacz signed on loan with Polish Ekstraklasa club Cracovia until the end of the year, with an option to buy. On his return to Polish football, on 20 February, he broke his collarbone in extra-time of a 0–0 league draw against Widzew Łódź, sidelining him for three months.

== International career ==
Bogacz made his international debut for Poland at under-21 level on 11 June 2025, coming on a substitute in a 1–2 loss to Georgia during Poland's opening game at the 2025 UEFA Euro Under-21.

== Career statistics ==
As of match played 13 May 2026

Appearances and goals by club, season and competition
Club	Season	League			National cup (Note: Includes Polish Cup, U.S. Open Cup)		Continental		Other		Total	
Club	Season	Division	Apps	Goals	Apps	Goals	Apps	Goals	Apps	Goals	Apps	Goals
Miedź Legnica II	2020–21	III liga, group III	1	0	—		—		—		1	0
Miedź Legnica II	2021–22	III liga, group III	1	0	—		—		—		1	0
Miedź Legnica II	2022–23	III liga, group III	10	2	—		—		—		10	2
Miedź Legnica II	2023–24	IV liga Lower Silesia	7	4	1	0	—		—		8	4
Miedź Legnica II	Total		19	6	1	0	—		—		20	6
Miedź Legnica	2023–24	I liga	14	5	0	0	—		—		14	5
Miedź Legnica	2024–25	I liga	11	3	2	0	—		—		13	3
Miedź Legnica	Total		25	8	2	0	—		—		27	8
New York Red Bulls	2025	Major League Soccer	19	1	3	0	—		2 (Note: Appearances in Leagues Cup)	0	24	1
New York Red Bulls II	2025	MLS Next Pro	2	2	—		—		—		2	2
Cracovia (loan)	2025–26	Ekstraklasa	1	0	—		—		—		1	0
Cracovia II (loan)	2025–26	III liga, group IV	2	0	—		—		—		2	0
Career total			68	17	6	0	0	0	2	0	76	17

== Honours ==
Miedź Legnica II

- IV liga Lower Silesia: 2023–24
- Polish Cup (Lower Silesia regionals): 2022–23
- Polish Cup (Legnica regionals): 2022–23
