= Kamil Antonik =

Polish footballer

Personal information
- Date of birth: 28 November 1998 (age 27)
- Place of birth: Lubaczów, Poland
- Height: 1.82 m (6 ft 0 in)
- Position: Midfielder

Team information
- Current team: Miedź Legnica
- Number: 98

Youth career
- –2014: Start Lisie Jamy

Senior career*
Years	Team	Apps	(Gls)
2016–2019	Resovia	30	(5)
2018	→ KS Wiązownica (loan)	14	(6)
2019–2020	Arka Gdynia	18	(0)
2020–2021	Zagłębie Sosnowiec	4	(0)
2021–2023	Resovia	67	(7)
2023–	Miedź Legnica	97	(20)
- * Club domestic league appearances and goals as of 14:58, 29 May 2026 (UTC)

Kamil Antonik (born 28 November 1998) is a Polish professional footballer who plays as a midfielder for I liga club Miedź Legnica.

== Club career ==
On 2 October 2020, he signed a two-year contract with Zagłębie Sosnowiec.
