= 2020–21 First League of the Republika Srpska =

First League of the Republika Srpska
- Season: 2020–21
- Dates: 8 August 2020 – 29 May 2021
- Champions: Rudar Prijedor; 3rd First League title
- Promoted: Rudar Prijedor; Leotar
- Relegated: Jedinstvo Brčko
- Matches played: 240
- Goals scored: 608 (2.53 per match)
- Top goalscorer: Bojan Marković; Nikola Mojović; Ognjen Stjepanović (14 goals each)

The 2020–21 First League of the Republika Srpska was the twenty-sixth season of the First League of the Republika Srpska, the second tier football league of Bosnia and Herzegovina, since its original establishment and the nineteenth as a second-tier league. The season began on 8 August 2020 and ended on 29 May 2021.

== Teams ==
- Borac Kozarska Dubica
- Drina Zvornik
- Jedinstvo Brčko
- Kozara Gradiška
- Leotar
- Ljubić Prnjavor
- Modriča
- Podrinje Janja
- Rudar Prijedor
- Slavija Sarajevo
- Sloboda Novi Grad
- Sloga Doboj
- Sutjeska Foča
- Tekstilac Derventa
- Zvijezda 09
- Željezničar Banja Luka

== League table ==
Pos	Team	Pld	W	D	L	GF	GA	GD	Pts	Promotion or relegation
1	Rudar Prijedor (C, P)	30	19	6	5	51	20	+31	63	Promotion to the Premijer Liga BiH
2	Leotar (Note: Krupa initially avoided relegation to the Prva Liga RS in the 2020–21 Premier League season, but were then relegated to the league due to failing to obtain a license for the Premier League, with Leotar getting promoted as their replacement.) (P)	30	14	12	4	47	27	+20	54	Promotion to the Premijer Liga BiH
3	Zvijezda 09	30	15	8	7	50	33	+17	53	
4	Željezničar Banja Luka	30	12	10	8	46	37	+9	46	
5	Tekstilac Derventa	30	13	6	11	35	36	−1	45	
6	Sloboda Novi Grad	30	12	8	10	25	27	−2	44	
7	Modriča	30	12	7	11	52	37	+15	43	
8	Kozara	30	11	9	10	34	28	+6	42	
9	Slavija	30	10	11	9	30	33	−3	41	
10	Borac Kozarska Dubica	30	11	6	13	35	38	−3	39	
11	Sloga Doboj	30	9	11	10	34	29	+5	38	
12	Ljubić Prnjavor	30	11	5	14	45	45	0	38	
13	Drina Zvornik	30	10	8	12	39	50	−11	38	
14	Sutjeska Foča	30	10	5	15	39	40	−1	35	
15	Podrinje Janja	30	5	6	19	17	56	−39	21	
16	Jedinstvo Brčko (R)	30	4	6	20	29	72	−43	18	Relegation to the Second League of RS

Source: rezultati.com
Rules for classification: 1) Points; 2) Head-to-head points; 3) Head-to-head goal difference; 4) Head-to-head goals scored; 5) Head-to-head away goals scored (only if two teams); 6) Goal difference; 7) Goals scored; 8) Play-off.
(C) Champions; (P) Promoted; (R) Relegated

== See also ==
- 2020–21 Premier League of Bosnia and Herzegovina
- 2020–21 First League of the Federation of Bosnia and Herzegovina
- 2020–21 Bosnia and Herzegovina Football Cup
