= Stjepan Vego =

Footballer (born 1997)

Personal information
- Date of birth: 9 July 1997 (age 29)
- Place of birth: Hamburg, Germany
- Height: 1.84 m (6 ft 0 in)
- Position: Left-back

Youth career
- 2014–2015: Victoria Hamburg

Senior career*
Years	Team	Apps	(Gls)
2015–2016	Victoria Hamburg	6	(0)
2017	Hamburger SV III	7	(0)
2017–2019	GOŠK Gabela	48	(0)
2019–2020	Inter Zaprešić	12	(1)
2021	Celje	3	(0)
2021	Hrvatski Dragovoljac	3	(0)
2022	GOŠK Gabela	13	(0)
2022–2023	Željezničar	10	(0)

International career
2018	Bosnia and Herzegovina U21	1	(0)
- * Club domestic league appearances and goals as of 6 November 2022

Stjepan Vego (born 9 July 1997) is a professional footballer who plays as a left-back. Born in Germany, he has represented Bosnia and Herzegovina internationally.

== Club career ==
=== Early career ===
Vego started playing football at the age of 4 with SC Egenbüttel, and later Niendorfer. In 2014, he joined the youth team of Victoria Hamburg, before debuting for the first team in 2015. He stayed at Victoria until 2016. For a short period in 2017, Vego played for Hamburger SV III in the Landesliga Hamburg-Hammonia.

=== GOŠK Gabela ===
In summer 2017, Vego signed with, at the time, Bosnian Premier League club GOŠK Gabela. He made his competitive debut for GOŠK on 15 October 2017, in a 2–2 draw against Mladost Doboj Kakanj.

On 30 June 2018, Vego extended his contract with GOŠK. On 7 June 2019, after the club got relegated to the First League of FBiH, he decided to leave GOŠK.

=== Inter Zaprešić ===
On 7 June 2019, right after leaving GOŠK, Vego signed a contract with 1. HNL club Inter Zaprešić.

== International career ==
Vego has represented Bosnia and Herzegovina at under-21 level and made one appearance for the team in a friendly match against Albania. He was later called up to represent the Croatia under-21 team, but did not make an appearance.

== Career statistics ==
=== Club ===
As of match played 25 July 2020

Appearances and goals by club, season and competition
Club	Season	League			Cup		Continental		Other		Total	
Club	Season	Division	Apps	Goals	Apps	Goals	Apps	Goals	Apps	Goals	Apps	Goals
Victoria Hamburg	2015–16	Oberliga Hamburg	6	0	—		—		1 (Note: Appearance in Hamburg Cup)	0	7	0
Hamburger SV III	2016–17	Landesliga Hamburg-Hammonia	7	0	—		—		—		7	0
GOŠK Gabela	2017–18	Bosnian Premier League	23	0	1	0	—		—		24	0
GOŠK Gabela	2018–19	Bosnian Premier League	25	0	2	0	—		—		27	0
GOŠK Gabela	Total		48	0	3	0	0	0	0	0	51	0
Inter Zaprešić	2019–20	1. HNL	12	1	2	0	—		—		14	1
Career total			73	1	5	0	0	0	1	0	79	1
