= 1996–97 FK Sarajevo season =

Sarajevo
1996–97 season
- Sporting manager: Denijal Pirić
- President: Muhamed Granov
- Manager: Nermin Hadžiahmetović
- Stadium: Stadion Grbavica; Koševo City Stadium
- First League of BiH: 2nd
- Cup of BiH: Winners
- Top goalscorer: League: Džemo Smječanin; Dženan Uščuplić (11); All: Džemo Smječanin; Dženan Uščuplić (12)
- Highest home attendance: 25,000 vs Željezničar (31 May 1997)
- Biggest win: Sarajevo 7–1 Radnik (23 November 1996)
- Biggest defeat: Bosna 2–0 Sarajevo (12 September 1996)

The 1996–97 Sarajevo season was the club's 48th season in history, and their 3rd consecutive season in the top flight of Bosnian football, the First League of BiH. Besides competing in the Premier League, the team competed in the National Cup.

== Squad information ==
=== First-team squad ===
Note: Flags indicate national team as defined under FIFA eligibility rules; some limited exceptions apply. Players may hold more than one non-FIFA nationality.

No.	Pos.	Nation	Player
1 12	GK	BIH	Mirsad Dedić (captain)
2	DF	BIH	Reuf Herco
3	DF	BIH	Dženan Hošić
4	FW	BIH	Alen Avdić
5	DF	BIH	Elvedin Beganović
6	MF	BIH	Dženan Uščuplić
7	MF	BIH	Senad Repuh
8	MF	BIH	Nermin Gogalić
11 9	FW	BIH	Džemo Smječanin
10	FW	BIH	Almir Turković (captain)
10 11	MF	BIH	Faruk Ihtijarević
13 4	DF	BIH	Adnan Ćupina
14	DF	BIH	Mensur Džaviti
14 15	FW	BIH	Aldin Čenan

No.	Pos.	Nation	Player
15	DF	BIH	Almir Mešetović
9 16	FW	BIH	Emir Granov
16 17	MF	BIH	Amar Ferhatović
18	DF	BIH	Mirza Selimović
19	MF	BIH	Nedžad Fazlagić
19	GK	BIH	Adnan Pervan
22 1	GK	YUG	Vukašin Petranović
—	GK	BIH	Nedžad Sirćo
—	DF	BIH	Kemal Elkaz
—	DF	BIH	Muamer Dalipagić
—	DF	BIH	Ahmed Hadžispahić
—	DF	BIH	Mirsad Mujkić
—	MF	BIH	Jasmin Toromanović
—	MF	BIH	Samer Naser
—	FW	BIH	Ismet Alić

== Kit ==
Supplier	Sponsors
(Belgium) Patrick	(Bosnia and Herzegovina) PTT BiH, (Bosnia and Herzegovina) EP, (Bosnia and Herzegovina) JEDINA

== Competitions ==
=== Overview ===
Competition	First match	Last match	Starting round	Final position	Record							
Competition	First match	Last match	Starting round	Final position	Pld	W	D	L	GF	GA	GD	Win %
First League of BiH	17 August 1996	24 May 1997	Matchday 1	2nd	30	16	8	6	53	21	+32	53.33
Cup of BiH	12 March 1997	31 May 1997	Round of 16	Winners	5	4	1	0	16	3	+13	80.00
Total					35	20	9	6	69	24	+45	57.14

Source: Competitions

=== First League of Bosnia and Herzegovina ===
==== League table ====
Pos	Team	Pld	W	D	L	GF	GA	GD	Pts	Qualification or relegation
1	Čelik (C)	30	17	7	6	57	23	+34	58	Champions
2	Sarajevo	30	16	8	6	53	21	+32	56	
3	Bosna	30	16	6	8	60	29	+31	54	
4	Lukavac	30	15	5	10	43	38	+5	50	
5	Jedinstvo Bihać	30	15	3	12	49	33	+16	48	

Source: RSSSF.org
(C) Champions

==== Matches ====
17 August 1996 1	Sarajevo	3–0	Turbina	Sarajevo
		Report		Stadium: Stadion Grbavica

22 August 1996 2	Travnik	2–1	Sarajevo	Travnik
		Report		Stadium: Stadion Pirota

7 September 1996 3	Sarajevo	3–0	Velež	Sarajevo
		Report		Stadium: Stadion Grbavica; Attendance: 2,000

12 September 1996 4	Bosna	2–0	Sarajevo	Visoko
		Report		Stadium: Stadion Luke

15 September 1996 5	Sarajevo	2–2	Zenica	Sarajevo
		Report		Stadium: Stadion Grbavica

21 September 1996 6	Željezničar	1–1	Sarajevo	Sarajevo
		Report		Stadium: Stadion Grbavica; Attendance: 12,000

28 September 1996 7	Sarajevo	2–2	Sloboda	Sarajevo
		Report		Stadium: Stadion Grbavica; Attendance: 2,000

12 October 1996 8	Lukavac	2–1	Sarajevo	Lukavac
		Report		Stadium: Stadion Jošik; Attendance: 1,500

19 October 1996 9	Sarajevo	1–0	Rudar Kakanj	Sarajevo
		Report		Stadium: Stadion Grbavica

26 October 1996 10	Gradina	0–0	Sarajevo	Srebrenik
		Report		Stadium: Srebrenik City Stadium; Attendance: 3,000

2 November 1996 11	Sarajevo	3–0	Rudar Breza	Sarajevo
		Report		Stadium: Stadion Grbavica; Attendance: 2,000

13 November 1996 12	Čelik	0–0	Sarajevo	Zenica
		Report		Stadium: Bilino Polje Stadium; Attendance: 10,000

16 November 1996 13	Sarajevo	3–1	Jedinstvo	Sarajevo
		Report		Stadium: Stadion Grbavica; Attendance: 3,000

23 November 1996 14	Sarajevo	7–1	Radnik	Sarajevo
		Report		Stadium: Stadion Grbavica; Attendance: 2,500

30 November 1996 15	Zmaj od Bosne	1–0	Sarajevo	Tuzla
		Report		Stadium: Tušanj City Stadium

8 March 1997 16	Turbina	0–3	Sarajevo	Jablanica
		Report		Stadium: Jablanica City Stadium

13 March 1997 17	Sarajevo	3–0	Travnik	Sarajevo
		Report		Stadium: Stadion Grbavica; Attendance: 3,000

22 March 1997 18	Velež	0–2	Sarajevo	Mostar
		Report		Stadium: Vrapčići Stadium; Attendance: 4,000

26 March 1997 19	Sarajevo	0–0	Bosna	Sarajevo
		Report		Stadium: Stadion Grbavica; Attendance: 7,000

5 April 1997 20	Zenica	1–1	Sarajevo	Zenica
		Report		Stadium: Bilino Polje Stadium; Attendance: 7,000

12 April 1997 22	Sloboda	0–1	Sarajevo	Tuzla
		Report		Stadium: Tušanj City Stadium; Attendance: 3,000

16 April 1997 21	Sarajevo	1–0	Željezničar	Sarajevo
		Report		Stadium: Koševo City Stadium; Attendance: 20,000

19 April 1997 23	Sarajevo	4–1	Lukavac	Sarajevo
		Report		Stadium: Koševo City Stadium; Attendance: 4,500

23 April 1997 24	Rudar Kakanj	1–0	Sarajevo	Kakanj
		Report		Stadium: Stadion pod Vardom; Attendance: 3,000

26 April 1997 25	Sarajevo	4–1	Gradina	Sarajevo
		Report		Stadium: Koševo City Stadium; Attendance: 2,000

3 May 1997 26	Rudar Breza	1–1	Sarajevo	Breza
		Report		Stadium: Breza City Stadium; Attendance: 4,000

7 May 1997 27	Sarajevo	2–0	Čelik	Sarajevo
		Report		Stadium: Koševo City Stadium; Attendance: 6,000

10 May 1997 28	Jedinstvo	1–0	Sarajevo	Bihać
		Report		Stadium: Stadion pod Borićima; Attendance: 5,000

17 May 1997 29	Radnik	1–2	Sarajevo	Hadžići
		Report		Stadium: Hadžići City Stadium; Attendance: 500

24 May 1997 30	Sarajevo	2–0	Zmaj od Bosne	Sarajevo
		Report		Stadium: Koševo City Stadium; Attendance: 1,000

=== Cup of Bosnia and Herzegovina ===
==== Round of 16 ====
12 March 1997	Krivaja Zavidovići	1–5	Sarajevo	Zavidovići
13:00 CET (UTC+1)		Report		Stadium: Zavidovići City Stadium

==== Quarter-finals ====
30 April 1997	Sarajevo	5–0	Budućnost Banovići	Sarajevo
16:00 CEST (UTC+2)		Report		Stadium: Koševo City Stadium; Attendance: 500

==== Semi-finals ====
14 May 1997 First leg	Sarajevo	4–2	Čelik	Sarajevo
16:30 CEST (UTC+2)		Report		Stadium: Koševo City Stadium; Attendance: 4,000

21 May 1997 Second leg	Čelik	0–0 (2–4 agg.)	Sarajevo	Zenica
17:30 CEST (UTC+2)		Report		Stadium: Bilino Polje Stadium; Attendance: 12,000

==== Final ====
31 May 1997	Sarajevo	2–0	Željezničar	Sarajevo
16:30 CEST (UTC+2)	4 DF Adnan Ćupina (yellow card); Repuh 30' (yellow card) 69' 6 MF Dženan Uščuplić (red card) 86'; Ferhatović 88' 1 GK Vukašin Petranović (yellow card) 90+1'	Report		Stadium: Koševo City Stadium; Attendance: 25,000; Referee: Mirsad Ibrišimbegović (Travnik)

== Statistics ==
Rank	Player	Games
1	(Bosnia and Herzegovina) Dženan Uščuplić	34
2	(Bosnia and Herzegovina) Džemo Smječanin	32
3	(Bosnia and Herzegovina) Nermin Gogalić	32
4	(Bosnia and Herzegovina) Senad Repuh	31
5	(Bosnia and Herzegovina) Dženan Hošić	31

Rank	Player	Goals
1	(Bosnia and Herzegovina) Dženan Uščuplić	12
2	(Bosnia and Herzegovina) Džemo Smječanin	12
3	(Bosnia and Herzegovina) Almir Turković	8
4	(Bosnia and Herzegovina) Senad Repuh	7
5	(Bosnia and Herzegovina) Alen Avdić	6
6	(Bosnia and Herzegovina) Nermin Gogalić	6
