= 1997–98 FK Sarajevo season =

Sarajevo
1997–98 season
- President: Muhamed Granov
- Manager: Mehmed Janjoš
- Stadium: Koševo City Stadium
- First League of BiH: 2nd
- Cup of BiH: Winners
- Supercup of BiH: Winners
- Top goalscorer: League: Alen Avdić (14); All: Alen Avdić (14)
- Highest home attendance: 40,000 vs Željezničar (3 May 1998)
- Biggest win: Olimpik 1–5 Sarajevo (14 August 1997); Sarajevo 5–1 Travnik (23 August 1997)
- Biggest defeat: Čelik 3–1 Sarajevo (30 July 1997); Čelik 3–1 Sarajevo (14 September 1997); Sloboda 3–1 Sarajevo (13 May 1998)

The 1997–98 Sarajevo season was the club's 49th season in history, and their 4th consecutive season in the top flight of Bosnian football, the First League of BiH. Besides competing in the Premier League, the team competed in the National Cup and the National Supercup.

== Squad information ==
=== First-team squad ===
Note: Flags indicate national team as defined under FIFA eligibility rules; some limited exceptions apply. Players may hold more than one non-FIFA nationality.

No.	Pos.	Nation	Player
1 17	GK	BIH	Mirsad Dedić (Captain)
7 2	FW	BIH	Džemo Smječanin (vice captain)
3	MF	BIH	Samir Duro
3 9	MF	BIH	Amar Ferhatović
10 15 4	FW	BIH	Ševal Zahirović
2 4 6	DF	BIH	Dženan Hošić
4 5 13	DF	BIH	Ahmed Hadžispahić
5	DF	BIH	Reuf Herco
6 3	DF	BIH	Elvedin Beganović
7 20	MF	BIH	Nermin Gogalić
8 12	FW	BIH	Alen Avdić
9	MF	BIH	Dženan Uščuplić
10	MF	CMR	Jean Louis Nouken
11	FW	BIH	Emir Granov

No.	Pos.	Nation	Player
12 1	GK	BIH	Almir Hurtić
13 16	FW	BIH	Ismet Alić
14 10	FW	BIH	Aldin Čenan
15	DF	BIH	Almir Mešetović
16 9 7	MF	BIH	Faruk Ihtijarević
13 18	DF	BIH	Mirza Selimović
14 23	MF	BIH	Azrudin Valentić
25	DF	BIH	Senad Begić
—	DF	BIH	Adnan Ćupina
—	DF	BIH	Ervin Uščuplić
—	DF	BIH	Emir Alihodžić
—	MF	BIH	Emir Tufek
—	MF	BIH	Almir Ušanović

== Kit ==
Supplier	Sponsor
(England) Umbro	(Bosnia and Herzegovina) Sarajevo Tobacco Factory

== Competitions ==
=== Overview ===
Competition	First match	Last match	Starting round	Final position	Record							
Competition	First match	Last match	Starting round	Final position	Pld	W	D	L	GF	GA	GD	Win %
First League of BiH	9 August 1997	5 June 1998	Matchday 1	2nd	33	16	9	8	58	35	+23	48.48
Cup of BiH	28 February 1998	26 August 1998	Round of 16	Winners	8	4	4	0	7	2	+5	50.00
Supercup of BiH	30 July 1997	2 August 1997	Final	Winners	2	1	0	1	3	3	+0	50.00
Total					43	21	13	9	68	40	+28	48.84

Source: Competitions

=== First League of Bosnia and Herzegovina ===
==== Regular season ====
Pos	Team	Pld	W	D	L	GF	GA	GD	Pts	Qualification or relegation
1	Bosna (Q)	30	19	3	8	55	28	+27	60	Qualification to championship play-off
2	Čelik (Q)	30	16	8	6	48	30	+18	56	Qualification to championship play-off
3	Sarajevo (Q)	30	15	8	7	56	33	+23	53	Qualification to championship play-off
4	Željezničar (Q)	30	14	7	9	49	42	+7	49	Qualification to championship play-off
5	Sloboda Tuzla	30	13	7	10	39	27	+12	46	

Source: RSSSF.org
Rules for classification: 1) points; 2) goal difference; 3) number of goals scored.
(Q) Qualified for the phase indicated

===== Matches =====
9 August 1997 1	Sarajevo	2–2	Lukavac	Sarajevo
		Report		Stadium: Koševo City Stadium

14 August 1997 2	Olimpik	1–5	Sarajevo	Sarajevo
		Report		Stadium: Stadion Grbavica

23 August 1997 3	Sarajevo	5–1	Travnik	Sarajevo
		Report		Stadium: Koševo City Stadium

30 August 1997 4	Sarajevo	3–2	Gradina	Sarajevo
		Report		Stadium: Koševo City Stadium; Attendance: 2,000

14 September 1997 5	Čelik	3–1	Sarajevo	Zenica
		Report		Stadium: Bilino Polje Stadium; Attendance: 7,000

28 September 1997 7	Velež	3–2	Sarajevo	Mostar
		Report		Stadium: Vrapčići Stadium; Attendance: 2,500

4 October 1997 8	Sarajevo	3–0	Jedinstvo	Sarajevo
		Report		Stadium: Koševo City Stadium; Attendance: 1,500

11 October 1997 9	Rudar Kakanj	1–3	Sarajevo	Kakanj
		Report		Stadium: Stadion pod Vardom; Attendance: 2,000

15 October 1997 6	Sarajevo	2–0	Zmaj od Bosne	Sarajevo
		Report		Stadium: Koševo City Stadium; Attendance: 1,000

18 October 1997 10	Sarajevo	2–1	Bosna	Sarajevo
		Report		Stadium: Koševo City Stadium; Attendance: 8,000

26 October 1997 11	Željezničar	1–2	Sarajevo	Sarajevo
		Report		Stadium: Stadion Grbavica; Attendance: 20,000

1 November 1997 12	Sarajevo	1–0	Rudar Breza	Sarajevo
		Report		Stadium: Koševo City Stadium; Attendance: 1,500

9 November 1997 13	Zenica	2–1	Sarajevo	Zenica
		Report		Stadium: Bilino Polje Stadium; Attendance: 10,000

15 November 1997 14	Sarajevo	0–0	Sloboda	Sarajevo
		Report		Stadium: Koševo City Stadium; Attendance: 3,000

23 November 1997 15	Drina	1–0	Sarajevo	Živinice
		Report		Stadium: Živinice City Stadium; Attendance: 3,000

7 March 1998 16	Lukavac	2–5	Sarajevo	Lukavac
		Report		Stadium: Jošik Stadium; Attendance: 4,000

14 March 1998 17	Sarajevo	2–0	Olimpik	Sarajevo
		Report		Stadium: Koševo City Stadium; Attendance: 2,000

21 March 1998 18	Travnik	0–0	Sarajevo	Travnik
		Report		Stadium: Stadion Pirota; Attendance: 2,000

28 March 1998 19	Gradina	3–2	Sarajevo	Srebrenik
		Report		Stadium: Srebrenik City Stadium; Attendance: 5,000

4 April 1998 20	Sarajevo	3–0	Čelik	Sarajevo
		Report		Stadium: Koševo City Stadium; Attendance: 8,000

12 April 1998 21	Zmaj od Bosne	2–1	Sarajevo	Tuzla
		Report		Stadium: Tušanj City Stadium; Attendance: 2,500

15 April 1998 22	Sarajevo	3–0	Velež	Sarajevo
		Report		Stadium: Koševo City Stadium; Attendance: 5,000

18 April 1998 23	Jedinstvo	0–0	Sarajevo	Bihać
		Report		Stadium: Stadion pod Borićima; Attendance: 6,000

25 April 1998 24	Sarajevo	1–0	Rudar Kakanj	Sarajevo
		Report		Stadium: Koševo City Stadium; Attendance: 2,000

29 April 1998 25	Bosna	1–1	Sarajevo	Visoko
		Report		Stadium: Stadion Luke; Attendance: 6,000

3 May 1998 26	Sarajevo	1–1	Željezničar	Sarajevo
		Report		Stadium: Koševo City Stadium; Attendance: 40,000

6 May 1998 27	Rudar Breza	2–2	Sarajevo	Breza
		Report		Stadium: Breza City Stadium; Attendance: 3,000

9 May 1998 28	Sarajevo	0–0	Zenica	Goražde
		Report		Stadium: Goražde City Stadium; Attendance: 2,000

13 May 1998 29	Sloboda	3–1	Sarajevo	Tuzla
		Report		Stadium: Tušanj City Stadium; Attendance: 2,500

20 May 1998 30	Sarajevo	2–1	Drina	Kakanj
		Report		Stadium: Stadion pod Vardom; Attendance: 500

==== Play-offs ====
===== Group Mostar =====
Pos	Team	Pld	W	D	L	GF	GA	GD	Pts	Qualification
1	Sarajevo	2	1	1	0	2	1	+1	4	Advanced to final
2	Široki Brijeg	2	1	0	1	6	2	+4	3	
3	Čelik	2	0	1	1	2	7	−5	1	

27 May 1998	Široki Brijeg	0–1	Sarajevo	Mostar
		Report	Gogalić 78'	Stadium: Bijeli Brijeg Stadium; Attendance: 15,000

30 May 1998	Sarajevo	1–1	Čelik	Mostar
	Smječanin 50' (pen.)	Report	Hajdarević 48'	Stadium: Bijeli Brijeg Stadium; Attendance: 1,000

===== Final =====
5 June 1998	Sarajevo	0–1	Željezničar	Sarajevo
20:15 CEST (UTC+2)		Report	Zubanović 90'	Stadium: Koševo City Stadium; Attendance: 35,000; Referee: Lutz Michael Fröhlich (Germany)

=== Cup of Bosnia and Herzegovina ===
==== Round of 16 ====
28 February 1998	Sarajevo	2–0	Olimpik	Sarajevo
		Report		Stadium: Koševo City Stadium; Attendance: 3,000

==== Quarter-finals ====
11 March 1998 First leg	Sarajevo	2–1	Gradina	Sarajevo
		Report		Stadium: Koševo City Stadium; Attendance: 1,500

25 March 1998 Second leg	Gradina	1–1 (2–3 agg.)	Sarajevo	Srebrenik
		Report		Stadium: Srebrenik City Stadium; Attendance: 4,000

==== Semi-finals ====
8 April 1998 First leg	Zenica	0–0	Sarajevo	Zenica
		Report		Stadium: Bilino Polje Stadium; Attendance: 5,000

22 April 1998 Second leg	Sarajevo	0–0 (0–0 agg.) (3–2 p)	Zenica	Sarajevo
18:00 CEST (UTC+2)		Report		Stadium: Koševo City Stadium; Attendance: 5,000

==== Final ====
16 May 1998	Sarajevo	1–0 (a.e.t.)	Sloboda	Sarajevo
20:15 CEST (UTC+2)	Granov 113'	Report		Stadium: Koševo City Stadium; Attendance: 5,000; Referee: Džemal Čalija (Sarajevo)

==== Super Final ====
15 August 1998 First leg	Orašje	0–0	Sarajevo	Orašje
17:00 CEST (UTC+2)		Report		Stadium: Orašje City Stadium; Attendance: 2,000

26 August 1998 Second leg	Sarajevo	1–0 (1–0 agg.)	Orašje	Sarajevo
17:00 CEST (UTC+2)		Report		Stadium: Koševo City Stadium; Attendance: 3,000

=== Supercup of Bosnia and Herzegovina ===
30 July 1997 First leg	Čelik	3–1	Sarajevo	Zenica
19:00 CEST (UTC+2)		Report		Stadium: Bilino Polje Stadium

2 August 1997 Second leg	Sarajevo	2–0 (3–3 agg.)	Čelik	Sarajevo
17:30 CEST (UTC+2)		Report		Stadium: Koševo City Stadium; Attendance: 2,500

== Statistics ==
Rank	Player	Games
1.	(Bosnia and Herzegovina) Elvedin Beganović	36
2.	(Bosnia and Herzegovina) Faruk Ihtijarević	36
3.	(Bosnia and Herzegovina) Džemo Smječanin	36
4.	(Bosnia and Herzegovina) Ahmed Hadžispahić	35

Rank	Player	Goals
1.	(Bosnia and Herzegovina) Alen Avdić	14
2.	(Bosnia and Herzegovina) Dženan Uščuplić	8
3.	(Bosnia and Herzegovina) Džemo Smječanin	7
4.	(Bosnia and Herzegovina) Ševal Zahirović	7
