= 1998–99 FK Sarajevo season =

Sarajevo
1998–99 season
- President: Muhamed Granov
- Managers: Nermin Hadžiahmetović; Sead Jesenković
- Stadium: Koševo City Stadium
- First League of BiH: Winners
- Cup of BiH: Runners-up
- Supercup of BiH: Runners-up
- UEFA Cup: First qualifying round
- Top goalscorer: League: Džemo Smječanin (14); All: Džemo Smječanin (16)
- Highest home attendance: 30,000 vs Željezničar (8 August 1998)
- Lowest home attendance: 600 vs Iskra (29 August 1998)
- Average home league attendance: 4,773
- Biggest win: Sarajevo 5–0 Iskra (29 August 1998)
- Biggest defeat: Željezničar 4–0 Sarajevo (25 November 1998)

The 1998–99 Sarajevo season was the club's 50th season in history, and their 5th consecutive season in the top flight of Bosnian football, the First League of BiH. Besides competing in the Premier League, the team competed in the National Cup, National Supercup and the qualifications for UEFA Cup.

== Squad information ==
=== First-team squad ===
Note: Flags indicate national team as defined under FIFA eligibility rules; some limited exceptions apply. Players may hold more than one non-FIFA nationality.

No.	Pos.	Nation	Player
1	GK	BIH	Mirsad Dedić (captain)
23 21 2	FW	BIH	Džemo Smječanin
18 3 14	DF	BIH	Mirza Selimović
3 4 2 4	MF	BIH	Samir Duro
4	DF	BIH	Ahmed Hadžispahić
5 9 5 4 8	DF	BIH	Senad Begić
2 5	DF	BIH	Memnun Suljagić
6	DF	BIH	Dženan Hošić
6 9	DF	YUG	Irfan Paučinac
6 13 6	DF	BIH	Edmir Ahmetović
7 11	MF	BIH	Nermin Gogalić
11 7 10	MF	BIH	Faruk Ihtijarević
8 16 3	DF	BIH	Jasmin Đidić
9	FW	BIH	Emir Granov
9	FW	BIH	Edin Šaranović
10	DF	BIH	Adnan Ćupina
10	MF	BIH	Amar Ferhatović
10	FW	BIH	Ševal Zahirović

No.	Pos.	Nation	Player
15 10	DF	BIH	Ervin Uščuplić
8 11	FW	BIH	Nedim Jusufbegović
12	GK	BIH	Almir Hurtić
14	DF	BIH	Ervin Smajlagić
7 15	FW	BIH	Alen Škoro
15 13	MF	BIH	Ismet Alić
14 16	MF	BIH	Azrudin Valentić
17	FW	BIH	Haris Haskić
22 3 18	MF	CMR	Jean Louis Nouken
19 6	DF	BIH	Muhidin Zukić
25 19	FW	BIH	Jasmin Memišević
—	DF	BIH	Emir Alihodžić
—	DF	BIH	Rusmir Kadrić
—	MF	BIH	Džemal Džumhur
—	MF	BIH	Nedim Mizdrak
—	MF	BIH	Almir Ušanović
—	FW	BIH	Alen Avdić

== Kit ==
Supplier	Sponsor
(England) Umbro	(Bosnia and Herzegovina) VEDRINA

== Competitions ==
=== Overview ===
Competition	First match	Last match	Starting round	Final position	Record							
Competition	First match	Last match	Starting round	Final position	Pld	W	D	L	GF	GA	GD	Win %
First League of BiH	1 August 1998	26 May 1999	Matchday 1	Winners	30	22	2	6	55	21	+34	73.33
Cup of BiH	4 March 1999	29 May 1999	Round of 16	Runners-up	6	3	1	2	6	3	+3	50.00
Supercup of BiH	25 November 1998		Final	Runners-up	1	0	0	1	0	4	−4	0.00
UEFA Cup	21 July 1998	28 July 1998	First qualifying round	First qualifying round	2	0	1	1	1	4	−3	0.00
Total					39	25	4	10	62	32	+30	64.10

Source: Competitions

=== First League of Bosnia and Herzegovina ===
==== League table ====
Pos	Team	Pld	W	D	L	GF	GA	GD	Pts	Qualification or relegation
1	Sarajevo (C)	30	22	2	6	55	21	+34	68	Champions
2	Bosna	30	18	2	10	50	21	+29	56	
3	Rudar Kakanj	30	15	7	8	39	26	+13	52	
4	Velež	30	15	7	8	46	37	+9	52	
5	Sloboda Tuzla	30	15	6	9	45	32	+13	51	

Source: RSSSF.org
(C) Champions

==== Matches ====
1 August 1998 1	Jedinstvo	2–1	Sarajevo	Bihać
		Report		Stadium: Stadion pod Borićima; Attendance: 5,000

8 August 1998 2	Sarajevo	3–1	Željezničar	Sarajevo
		Report		Stadium: Koševo City Stadium; Attendance: 30,000

29 August 1998 4	Sarajevo	5–0	Iskra	Sarajevo
		Report		Stadium: Koševo City Stadium; Attendance: 600

2 September 1998 3	Čelik	1–3	Sarajevo	Zenica
		Report		Stadium: Bilino Polje Stadium; Attendance: 20,000

9 September 1998 5	Zmaj od Bosne	0–2	Sarajevo	Tuzla
		Report		Stadium: Tušanj City Stadium; Attendance: 1,200

12 September 1998 6	Sarajevo	4–1	Budućnost	Sarajevo
		Report		Stadium: Koševo City Stadium; Attendance: 1,000

19 September 1998 7	Lukavac	2–0	Sarajevo	Lukavac
		Report		Stadium: Jošik Stadium; Attendance: 3,000

26 September 1998 8	Sarajevo	1–0	Gradina	Sarajevo
		Report		Stadium: Koševo City Stadium; Attendance: 2,000

3 October 1998 9	Rudar	2–0	Sarajevo	Kakanj
		Report		Stadium: Pod Vardom Stadium; Attendance: 5,000

18 October 1998 10	Sloboda	0–2	Sarajevo	Tuzla
		Report		Stadium: Tušanj City Stadium; Attendance: 3,000

24 October 1998 11	Sarajevo	2–1	Zenica	Sarajevo
		Report		Stadium: Koševo City Stadium; Attendance: 4,000

31 October 1998 12	Bosna	1–0	Sarajevo	Visoko
		Report		Stadium: Luke Stadium; Attendance: 4,000

7 November 1998 13	Sarajevo	3–1	Drina	Sarajevo
		Report		Stadium: Koševo City Stadium; Attendance: 1,500

14 November 1998 14	Vrbanjuša	0–1	Sarajevo	Visoko
		Report		Stadium: Luke Stadium; Attendance: 2,000

22 November 1998 15	Sarajevo	2–0	Velež	Sarajevo
		Report		Stadium: Koševo City Stadium; Attendance: 7,000

6 March 1999 16	Sarajevo	3–0	Jedinstvo	Sarajevo
		Report		Stadium: Koševo City Stadium; Attendance: 3,000

14 March 1999 17	Željezničar	1–2	Sarajevo	Sarajevo
		Report		Stadium: Stadion Grbavica; Attendance: 19,000

18 March 1999 18	Sarajevo	2–1	Čelik	Sarajevo
		Report		Stadium: Koševo City Stadium; Attendance: 3,500

20 March 1999 19	Iskra	0–0	Sarajevo	Bugojno
		Report		Stadium: Stadion Jaklić; Attendance: 3,000

3 April 1999 20	Sarajevo	1–0	Zmaj od Bosne	Sarajevo
		Report		Stadium: Koševo City Stadium; Attendance: 1,000

7 April 1999 21	Budućnost	1–0	Sarajevo	Banovići
		Report		Stadium: Stadion FK Budućnost; Attendance: 3,000

10 April 1999 22	Sarajevo	4–0	Lukavac	Sarajevo
		Report		Stadium: Koševo City Stadium; Attendance: 3,500

17 April 1999 23	Gradina	0–0	Sarajevo	Srebrenik
		Report		Stadium: Srebrenik City Stadium; Attendance: 2,500

22 April 1999 24	Sarajevo	2–1	Rudar	Sarajevo
		Report		Stadium: Koševo City Stadium; Attendance: 6,000

2 May 1999 25	Sarajevo	2–0	Sloboda	Sarajevo
		Report		Stadium: Koševo City Stadium; Attendance: 5,000

8 May 1999 26	Zenica	1–0	Sarajevo	Zenica
		Report		Stadium: Bilino Polje Stadium; Attendance: 500

11 May 1999 27	Sarajevo	1–0	Bosna	Sarajevo
		Report		Stadium: Koševo City Stadium; Attendance: 2,000

15 May 1999 28	Drina	3–1	Sarajevo	Banovići
		Report		Stadium: Stadion FK Budućnost; Attendance: 500

22 May 1999 29	Sarajevo	3–2	Vrbanjuša	Sarajevo
		Report		Stadium: Koševo City Stadium; Attendance: 1,500

26 May 1999 30	Velež	1–3	Sarajevo	Mostar
		Report		Stadium: Vrapčići Stadium; Attendance: 3,000

=== Cup of Bosnia and Herzegovina ===
==== Round of 16 ====
4 March 1999	Ozren Semizovac	1–2	Sarajevo	Semizovac
		Report		Stadium: Ešref Pustahija Eso Stadium; Attendance: 1,500

==== Quarter-finals ====
14 April 1999 First leg	Zmaj od Bosne	0–0	Sarajevo	Tuzla
		Report		Stadium: Tušanj City Stadium; Attendance: 1,000

25 April 1999 Second leg	Sarajevo	3–0 (3–0 agg.)	Zmaj od Bosne	Sarajevo
		Report		Stadium: Koševo City Stadium; Attendance: 2,500

==== Semi-finals ====
5 May 1999 First leg	Sarajevo	1–0	Željezničar	Sarajevo
18:00 CEST (UTC+2)		Report		Stadium: Koševo City Stadium; Attendance: 25,000

19 May 1999 Second leg	Željezničar	1–0 (1–1 agg.) (1–3 p)	Sarajevo	Sarajevo
17:30 CEST (UTC+2)		Report		Stadium: Stadion Grbavica; Attendance: 17,000

==== Final ====
29 May 1999	Sarajevo	0–1	Bosna Visoko	Sarajevo
17:00 CEST (UTC+2)		Report	Džafić 114'	Stadium: Koševo City Stadium; Attendance: 20,000; Referee: Edvin Medić (Bihać)

=== Supercup of Bosnia and Herzegovina ===
25 November 1998	Željezničar	4–0	Sarajevo	Sarajevo
13:00 CET (UTC+1)		Report	DF Adnan Ćupina (yellow card); 4 MF Samir Duro (yellow card) 29'; 5 DF Senad Begić (yellow card) 60'; 1 GK Mirsad Dedić (C) (penalty missed) 90'+5'	Stadium: Stadion Grbavica; Attendance: 18,000; Referee: Džemal Čalija (Sarajevo)

=== UEFA Cup ===
==== First qualifying round ====
21 July 1998 First leg	Germinal Ekeren (Belgium)	4–1	(Bosnia and Herzegovina) Sarajevo	Antwerp, Belgium
20:30 CEST (UTC+2)	van Ankeren 25'; Morhaye 29', 90'; Kovács 40'; Herreman (yellow card) 69'; Karagiannis (yellow card) 82'	Report	Zahirović (yellow card) 28'; Suljagić (yellow card) 49'; Ferhatović 59'; Granov (yellow card) 90+1'	Stadium: Veltwijckpark; Attendance: 3,500; Referee: Lucílio Batista (Portugal)

28 July 1998 Second leg	Sarajevo (Bosnia and Herzegovina)	0–0 (1–4 agg.)	(Belgium) Germinal Ekeren	Sarajevo, Bosnia and Herzegovina
20:00 CEST (UTC+2)	Smječanin (yellow card) 12'	Report	Verstraeten (yellow card) 80'	Stadium: Koševo City Stadium; Attendance: 17,000; Referee: Karl-Erik Nilsson (Sweden)

== Statistics ==
Appearances

Rank	Player	Games
1	Mirsad Dedić	37
2	Faruk Ihtijarević	34

Goalscorers

Rank	Player	Goals
1	Džemo Smječanin	16
2	Nedim Jusufbegović	9
