= 1995–96 FK Sarajevo season =

Sarajevo
1995–96 season
- Technical director: Vahidin Musemić
- President: Muhamed Granov
- Managers: Fuad Muzurović; Denijal Pirić
- Stadium: Koševo City Stadium
- First League of BiH: 7th
- Cup of BiH: Semi-finals
- Top goalscorer: League: Reuf Herco (9); All: Reuf Herco (13)
- Highest home attendance: 8,000 vs Željezničar (15 November 1995)
- Lowest home attendance: 200 vs Vrbanjuša (27 March 1996)
- Biggest win: Sarajevo 5–0 Željezničar (15 November 1995)
- Biggest defeat: Velež 3–0 Sarajevo (21 October 1995)

The 1995–96 Sarajevo season was the club's 47th season in history, and their 2nd consecutive season in the top flight of Bosnian football, the First League of BiH. Besides competing in the Premier League, the team competed in the National Cup.

== Squad information ==
=== First-team squad ===
Note: Flags indicate national team as defined under FIFA eligibility rules; some limited exceptions apply. Players may hold more than one non-FIFA nationality.

No.	Pos.	Nation	Player
1	GK	BIH	Midhat Čorbo
1	GK	BIH	Mirsad Dedić
2	DF	BIH	Rusmir Burek
2	DF	BIH	Kemal Elkaz
3	MF	BIH	Dženan Uščuplić
5 4	DF	BIH	Dženan Hošić
5	DF	BIH	Muamer Dalipagić
6	DF	BIH	Mirsad Mujkić
6	DF	BIH	Muhamed Bogilović
7	MF	BIH	Almir Ušanović
8 7	MF	BIH	Nermin Gogalić (Vice-captain)
8	DF	BIH	Mensur Džaviti
9	FW	BIH	Aldin Čenan (3rd captain)
4 10	DF	BIH	Armin Hrvat
11	DF	BIH	Reuf Herco (captain)
12	GK	BIH	Nedžad Sirćo
14	FW	BIH	Emir Granov

No.	Pos.	Nation	Player
15	MF	BIH	Amar Ferhatović
10 16	DF	BIH	Mirza Selimović
17	MF	BIH	Fikret Kapo
18	MF	BIH	Faruk Ihtijarević
19	MF	BIH	Nedžad Fazlagić
32	GK	BIH	Adnan Pervan
—	DF	BIH	Željko Pinek
—	DF	BIH	Kenan Čehajić
—	DF	BIH	Adis Čimić
—	DF	BIH	Admir Fejzić
—	DF	BIH	Emir Alihodžić
—	MF	BIH	Goran Marković
—	MF	BIH	Haris Karadža
—	MF	BIH	Suad Pašukan
—	FW	BIH	Nihad Mujagić
—	FW	BIH	Ismet Alić
—	FW	BIH	Edin Bulbul

== Kit ==
Supplier	Sponsor
(Italy) Erreà	(Bosnia and Herzegovina) PTT BiH

== Competitions ==
=== Overview ===
Competition	First match	Last match	Starting round	Final position	Record							
Competition	First match	Last match	Starting round	Final position	Pld	W	D	L	GF	GA	GD	Win %
First League of BiH	21 October 1995	21 June 1996	Matchday 1	7th	30	12	7	11	38	29	+9	40.00
Cup of BiH	13 March 1996	15 May 1996	Qualifications	Semi-finals	6	5	1	0	12	2	+10	83.33
Total					36	17	8	11	50	31	+19	47.22

Source: Competitions

=== First League of Bosnia and Herzegovina ===
==== League table ====
Pos	Team	Pld	W	D	L	GF	GA	GD	Pts
5	Jedinstvo Bihać	30	15	5	10	48	31	+17	50
6	Rudar Kakanj	30	14	5	11	46	35	+11	47
7	Sarajevo	30	12	7	11	38	29	+9	43
8	Rudar Breza	30	13	4	13	36	42	−6	43
9	Željezničar	30	12	4	14	35	62	−27	40

Source: RSSSF.org

==== Matches ====
21 October 1995 1	Velež	3–0	Sarajevo	Jablanica
		Report		Stadium: Jablanica City Stadium; Attendance: 1,500

28 October 1995 2	Sarajevo	1–2	Travnik	Sarajevo
		Report		Stadium: Koševo City Stadium; Attendance: 1,200

1 November 1995 3	Olimpik	1–2	Sarajevo	Sarajevo
		Report		Stadium: Koševo City Stadium

4 November 1995 4	Sarajevo	5–1	Sloboda	Sarajevo
		Report		Stadium: Koševo City Stadium

11 November 1995 5	Jedinstvo	1–0	Sarajevo	Bihać
		Report		Stadium: Stadion pod Borićima

15 November 1995 6	Sarajevo	5–0	Željezničar	Sarajevo
		Report		Stadium: Koševo City Stadium; Attendance: 8,000

18 November 1995 7	Rudar Breza	1–0	Sarajevo	Breza
		Report		Stadium: Breza City Stadium; Attendance: 2,000

26 November 1995 8	Sarajevo	2–0	Čelik	Sarajevo
		Report		Stadium: Koševo City Stadium; Attendance: 3,000

24 February 1996 9	Turbina	1–1	Sarajevo	Jablanica
		Report		Stadium: Jablanica City Stadium

2 March 1996 10	Sarajevo	0–0	Gradina	Sarajevo
		Report		Stadium: Koševo City Stadium; Attendance: 800

6 March 1996 11	Lukavac	3–1	Sarajevo	Lukavac
		Report		Stadium: Jošik Stadium; Attendance: 2,000

9 March 1996 12	Sarajevo	1–0	Zmaj od Bosne	Sarajevo
		Report		Stadium: Koševo City Stadium; Attendance: 2,000

16 March 1996 13	Rudar Kakanj	2–0	Sarajevo	Kakanj
		Report		Stadium: Stadion pod Vardom; Attendance: 3,000

23 March 1996 14	Iskra	2–1	Sarajevo	Bugojno
		Report		Stadium: Stadion Jaklić

30 March 1996 15	Sarajevo	0–1	Zenica	Sarajevo
		Report		Stadium: Koševo City Stadium; Attendance: 3,500

13 April 1996 17	Travnik	3–2	Sarajevo	Travnik
		Report		Stadium: Stadion Pirota; Attendance: 2,000

17 April 1996 18	Sarajevo	1–0	Olimpik	Sarajevo
		Report		Stadium: Koševo City Stadium; Attendance: 2,500

21 April 1996 19	Sloboda	1–0	Sarajevo	Tuzla
		Report		Stadium: Tušanj City Stadium; Attendance: 5,000

24 April 1996 16	Sarajevo	0–0	Velež	Sarajevo
		Report		Stadium: Koševo City Stadium; Attendance: 300

27 April 1996 20	Sarajevo	3–1	Jedinstvo	Sarajevo
		Report		Stadium: Koševo City Stadium

2 May 1996 21	Željezničar	1–1	Sarajevo	Sarajevo
		Report	2 DF Kemal Elkaz (yellow card); 4 DF Dženan Hošić (yellow card) 68'; 6 DF Mirsad Mujkić (yellow card) 73'	Stadium: Stadion Grbavica; Attendance: 20,000; Referee: Marko Mrkić (Tuzla)

5 May 1996 22	Sarajevo	3–0	Rudar Breza	Sarajevo
		Report		Stadium: Koševo City Stadium; Attendance: 3,000

11 May 1996 23	Čelik	2–0	Sarajevo	Zenica
		Report		Stadium: Bilino Polje Stadium; Attendance: 4,000

19 May 1996 24	Sarajevo	4–1	Turbina	Sarajevo
		Report		Stadium: Koševo City Stadium

25 May 1996 25	Gradina	1–1	Sarajevo	Srebrenik
		Report		Stadium: Srebrenik City Stadium

29 May 1996 26	Sarajevo	1–0	Lukavac	Sarajevo
		Report		Stadium: Koševo City Stadium

1 June 1996 27	Zmaj od Bosne	0–0	Sarajevo	Tuzla
		Report		Stadium: Tušanj City Stadium

8 June 1996 28	Sarajevo	0–0	Rudar Kakanj	Sarajevo
		Report		Stadium: Koševo City Stadium

15 June 1996 29	Sarajevo	1–0	Iskra	Sarajevo
		Report		Stadium: Koševo City Stadium

21 June 1996 30	Zenica	1–2	Sarajevo	Zenica
		Report		Stadium: Bilino Polje Stadium

=== Cup of Bosnia and Herzegovina ===
==== Qualifications (Sarajevo Canton Cup) ====
13 March 1996 Round of 16	Sarajevo	2–0	Partizan Sarajevo	Sarajevo
13:30 CET (UTC+1)		Report		Stadium: Koševo City Stadium; Attendance: 300

20 March 1996 Quarter-finals	Butmir	0–1	Sarajevo	Ilidža
14:00 CET (UTC+1)		Report		Stadium: Butmir; Attendance: 500

27 March 1996 Semi-finals	Sarajevo	3–1	Vrbanjuša	Sarajevo
14:00 CET (UTC+1)		Report		Stadium: Koševo City Stadium; Attendance: 200

3 April 1996 Final	Sarajevo	2–0	Olimpik	Sarajevo
15:00 CEST (UTC+2)		Report		Stadium: Koševo City Stadium; Attendance: 1,000

==== Quarter-finals ====
9 April 1996	Sarajevo	4–1	Radnički Goražde	Sarajevo
15:00 CEST (UTC+2)		Report		Stadium: Koševo City Stadium; Attendance: 500

==== Semi-finals ====
15 May 1996	Sarajevo	0–0 (5–6 p)	Čelik Zenica	Sarajevo
16:00 CEST (UTC+2)		Report		Stadium: Koševo City Stadium; Attendance: 4,000

== Statistics ==
Rank	Player	Games
1	(Bosnia and Herzegovina) Dženan Uščuplić	35
2	(Bosnia and Herzegovina) Nermin Gogalić	34
3	(Bosnia and Herzegovina) Reuf Herco	34
4	(Bosnia and Herzegovina) Mirza Selimović	31
5	(Bosnia and Herzegovina) Dženan Hošić	31

Rank	Player	Goals
1	(Bosnia and Herzegovina) Reuf Herco	13
2	(Bosnia and Herzegovina) Dženan Uščuplić	7
3	(Bosnia and Herzegovina) Aldin Čenan	6
4	(Bosnia and Herzegovina) Nermin Gogalić	6
5	(Bosnia and Herzegovina) Emir Granov	5
