= Elvedin Beganović =

Bosnian football manager (born 1971)

Personal information
- Date of birth: 7 November 1971 (age 54)
- Place of birth: Zenica, SFR Yugoslavia
- Position: Defender

Senior career*
Years	Team	Apps	(Gls)
1988–1992	NK Čelik Zenica	31	(1)
1992–1993	FC Remscheid	0	(0)
1992–1993	SpVgg Beckum	8	(0)
1993–1996	NK Đerzelez	53	(0)
1996–1998	FK Sarajevo	23	(0)
1998–1999	Erzurumspor	21	(0)
1999–2000	FK Sarajevo	86	(2)
2000–2003	NK Čelik Zenica	39	(2)
2003–2004	NK Travnik	74	(7)
2004–2007	NK Čelik Zenica	39	(1)

International career
1997–2002	Bosnia and Herzegovina	3	(0)

Managerial career
- 2011–2012: NK Čelik Zenica
- 2013: NK Travnik
- 2013–2014: FK Mladost Doboj Kakanj
- 2015–2016: NK Čelik Zenica
- 2016–2017: FK Rudar Kakanj
- 2017: NK Čelik Zenica
- 2019: FK Mladost Doboj Kakanj
- 2020: FK Mladost Doboj Kakanj (caretaker)
- 2022–2023: NK Jedinstvo Bihać
- 2023: NK TOŠK Tešanj
- * Club domestic league appearances and goals

Elvedin Beganović (born 7 November 1971) is a Bosnian professional football manager and former player.

== Club career ==
During his career, Beganović played for hometown side NK Čelik Zenica, FC Remscheid, SpVgg Beckum, NK Đerzelez, FK Sarajevo, Erzurumspor and NK Travnik. While playing for Sarajevo, he won the Bosnian Cup twice and the Bosnian Supercup once.

Beganović retired from active football in 2007 at the age of 36, while playing for Čelik.

== International career ==
Beganović made his debut for Bosnia and Herzegovina in an August 1997 FIFA World Cup qualification match against Denmark and has earned a total of 3 caps, scoring no goals. His final international was an April 2002 friendly game against Croatia.

== Managerial career ==
On 5 January 2011, Beganović received his UEFA Pro Licence in the Football Association of Bosnia and Herzegovina's educational facility in Jablanica, Bosnia and Herzegovina.

In his career, Beganović has managed Čelik Zenica on several occasions, Travnik, Mladost Doboj Kakanj and Rudar Kakanj.

In July 2018, he became the new assistant manager at Mladost, but after manager Adnan Zildžović left the club due to bad results, Beganović was named caretaker manager of Mladost until the end of the 2018–19 season. On 6 June 2019, it was announced that he got the job permanently after a meeting with the club's board of directors.

On 10 September 2019, Mladost announced that former club manager Ibrahim Rahimić came back to the club and became its new manager, but also stated that Beganović would stay at the club as Rahimić's assistant. After Rahimić was sacked, Beganović stayed as assistant to new manager Fahrudin Šolbić. In August 2020, he was once again caretaker manager of Mladost.

== Honours ==
=== Player ===
Sarajevo

- Bosnian Cup: 1996–97, 1997–98
- Bosnian Supercup: 1997
