= Sead Osmić =

Bosnian footballer

Personal information
- Full name: Sead Osmić
- Date of birth: 2 January 1970 (age 56)
- Place of birth: SFR Yugoslavia
- Position: Midfielder

Senior career*
Years	Team	Apps	(Gls)
1995–2000	Radnički Lukavac	129	(41)

International career^{‡}
1996-1997	Bosnia and Herzegovina	3	(0)
- * Club domestic league appearances and goals ‡ National team caps and goals as of 19 June 2021

Sead Osmić (born 2 January 1970) is a Bosnian retired football player.

== Club career ==
He formed a great partnership with striker Amir Osmanović at Radnički Lukavac, scoring 18 goals in the 1995/96 season in addition to Amir Osmanović' 27 goals to help Radnički finish in a historic 2nd place in the league.

== International career ==
Osmić made his debut for Bosnia and Herzegovina in a December 1996 friendly match away against Brazil and has earned a total of 3 caps, scoring no goals. His final international was a February 1997 Dunhill Cup match against Indonesia.
