= Nermin Hadžiahmetović =

Bosnian football manager (born 1953)

Personal information
- Date of birth: 15 October 1953 (age 73)
- Place of birth: Zenica, FPR Yugoslavia

Managerial career
- Years: Team
- 1992–1996: Čelik Zenica
- 1996–1998: Bosnia and Herzegovina U21
- 1996–1997: Sarajevo
- 1997–1998: Primorje
- 1998–1999: Sarajevo
- 2000–2001: Čelik Zenica
- 2006–2008: Olimpik
- 2008: Manama Club
- 2009: Sloboda Tuzla

Nermin Hadžiahmetović (born 15 October 1953) is a Bosnian former football manager.

He led Čelik Zenica to the first ever Bosnian league title in the 1994–95 season. Hadžiahmetović won one more league title with Čelik in 1996, and one with Sarajevo in 1999.

== Honours ==
=== Manager ===
Čelik Zenica

- Bosnian First League: 1994–95, 1995–96
- Bosnian Cup: 1994–95, 1995–96

Sarajevo

- Bosnian First League: 1998–99
- Bosnian Cup: 1996–97
