= 1996–97 First League of Bosnia and Herzegovina =

Association football competition

Statistics of First League of Bosnia and Herzegovina in the 1996–97 season. It was contested only by Bosniak clubs. Serbian clubs played in the 1996–97 First League of the Republika Srpska and the Croatian clubs in the 1996–97 First League of Herzeg-Bosnia.

== Overview ==
It was contested by 16 teams, and NK Čelik Zenica won the championship.

== Final table ==
Pos	Team	Pld	W	D	L	GF	GA	GD	Pts	Qualification or relegation
1	Čelik (C)	30	17	7	6	57	23	+34	58	Champions
2	Sarajevo	30	16	8	6	53	21	+32	56	
3	Bosna	30	16	6	8	60	29	+31	54	
4	Lukavac	30	15	5	10	43	38	+5	50	
5	Jedinstvo Bihać	30	15	3	12	49	33	+16	48	
6	Zenica	30	12	11	7	38	29	+9	47	
7	Željezničar	30	13	5	12	46	41	+5	44	
8	Rudar Kakanj	30	13	5	12	37	33	+4	44	
9	Sloboda Tuzla	30	12	7	11	45	33	+12	43	
10	Velež	30	13	4	13	44	41	+3	43	
11	Gradina Srebrenik	30	11	8	11	40	44	−4	41	
12	Zmaj od Bosne	30	12	5	13	29	33	−4	41	
13	Rudar Breza	30	10	7	13	26	38	−12	37	
14	Travnik	30	10	3	17	34	57	−23	33	
15	Turbina (R)	30	9	5	16	38	55	−17	32	Relegation to Second League of Bosnia and Herzegovina
16	Radnik Hadžići (R)	30	1	1	28	12	103	−91	4	Relegation to Second League of Bosnia and Herzegovina

Source: RSSSF.org
(C) Champions; (R) Relegated

== Results ==
Home \ Away	BOS	ČEL	GRA	JED	LUK	RAD	RBR	RKA	SAR	SLO	TUR	TRA	VEL	ZEN	ZMA	ŽEL
Bosna		1–0	4–0	2–0	2–0	6–0	0–0	5–0	2–0	1–0	10–3	6–1	2–0	0–0	3–1	3–1
Čelik	1–0		3–0	3–1	2–0	6–0	3–1	3–1	0–0	1–0	4–1	3–0	3–1	1–1	4–1	1–1
Gradina Srebrenik	0–0	1–0		1–0	0–0	5–1	2–1	1–1	0–0	1–1	2–3	3–2	3–0	1–1	2–1	2–0
Jedinstvo Bihać	3–0	0–2	2–1		1–0	9–1	1–0	1–0	1–0	2–0	3–1	6–0	3–3	2–0	1–0	2–0
Lukavac	3–0	2–1	2–1	1–0		3–0	1–1	3–1	2–1	3–0	4–2	5–0	4–0	0–2	0–0	2–1
Radnik Hadžići	1–2	0–4	0–5	2–4	1–2		0–2	0–2	1–2	0–2	0–2	1–0	0–3	0–1	1–2	1–2
Rudar Breza	1–0	1–4	2–1	1–0	0–0	0–0		2–0	2–2	2–2	2–0	2–1	1–0	0–0	1–0	2–1
Rudar Kakanj	1–1	0–0	3–1	2–1	5–0	4–0	1–0		1–0	1–1	1–0	3–1	2–0	0–1	3–0	1–0
Sarajevo	0–0	2–0	4–1	3–1	4–1	7–1	3–0	1–0		2–2	3–0	3–0	3–0	2–2	2–0	1–0
Sloboda Tuzla	3–0	2–1	0–1	2–1	3–0	5–0	3–0	2–0	0–1		4–0	3–1	2–0	3–3	0–1	3–5
Turbina	1–2	1–1	1–1	0–0	3–0	4–0	3–0	1–2	0–3	2–0		3–0	0–0	1–1	3–1	0–2
Travnik	2–4	0–1	3–0	4–2	1–2	3–1	3–2	1–1	2–1	0–1	2–0		2–1	1–0	1–0	3–0
Velež	2–1	2–2	5–0	1–0	4–1	6–0	2–0	1–0	0–2	1–0	2–1	2–0		1–1	3–0	3–0
Zenica	2–1	0–1	2–2	2–0	0–1	3–0	2–1	2–0	1–1	0–0	0–1	1–0	5–1		1–0	2–1
Zmaj od Bosne	1–1	0–0	1–0	1–2	1–0	2–0	1–0	2–0	1–0	0–0	2–0	0–0	2–0	4–1		2–1
Željezničar	2–1	3–2	1–2	0–0	1–1	5–0	3–0	2–1	1–1	3–1	3–1	0–0	1–0	3–1	3–2	

Source: RSSSF.org
Legend: Blue = home team win; Yellow = draw; Red = away team win.

== Top goalscorers ==
Rank	Scorer	Club	Goals
1	(Bosnia and Herzegovina) Nermin Vazda	Bosna Visoko	17
2	(Bosnia and Herzegovina) Adis Obad	Velež Mostar	16
3	(Bosnia and Herzegovina) Dželaludin Muharemović	Željezničar	14
4	(Bosnia and Herzegovina) Sead Osmić	Lukavac	12
5	(Bosnia and Herzegovina) Dženan Uščuplić	Sarajevo	11
5	(Bosnia and Herzegovina) Džemo Smječanin	Sarajevo	11
5	(Bosnia and Herzegovina) Selam Tulić	Jedinstvo Bihać	11
5	(Bosnia and Herzegovina) Hidajet Mehremić	Turbina Jablanica	11
9	(Bosnia and Herzegovina) Amir Japaur	Čelik Zenica	10
9	(Bosnia and Herzegovina) Enes Mešanović	Sloboda Tuzla	10

- Source: SportSport.ba forum

== See also ==
- 1996–97 First League of the Republika Srpska
