= Amir Osmanović =

Bosnian footballer (1970–2025)

Personal information
- Date of birth: 7 June 1970
- Place of birth: Lukavac, SFR Yugoslavia
- Date of death: 21 August 2025 (aged 55)
- Position: Forward

Senior career*
Years	Team	Apps	(Gls)
1989–1991	Radnički Lukavac		
1991–1993	Maribor		
1994–1996	Radnički Lukavac	33	(30)
1996–1998	Chemnitzer FC	45	(11)
1998	Winterthur		
1998	Shandong Luneng	12	(2)
1999	Beijing Kuanli		(15)
2000	Xiamen Xiaxin	9	(2)
2000	Beijing Kuanli	13	(5)
2001	Tianjin Lifei	16	(3)

International career
1995	Bosnia and Herzegovina	1	(0)
- * Club domestic league appearances and goals

Amir Osmanović (7 June 1970 - 21 August 2025) was a Bosnian professional footballer who played as a forward for several clubs in Europe and Asia.

== Club career ==
Osmanović played for Radnički Lukavac in the Bosnian First League. He also had a spell with Chemnitzer FC in the German Regionalliga.

== International career ==
Osmanović made his debut in Bosnia and Herzegovina's first ever official international game, coming on as a second-half substitute for Husref Musemić in a November 1995 friendly match away against Albania. It remained his sole international appearance.

== Honours ==
Maribor

- Slovenian Cup: 1991–92

Individual

- Bosnian First League top scorer: 1995–96
- China League One top scorer: 1999
