= Seval (disambiguation) =

Seval most often refers to the 2008 Tamil film of the same name. It may also refer to:

- Seval (given name)
- Impol Seval, Serbian aluminium manufacturing company
