= Mirsad Dedić =

Bosnian footballer and coach

Personal information
- Date of birth: 21 February 1968 (age 58)
- Place of birth: Srebrenik, SFR Yugoslavia
- Position: Goalkeeper

Team information
- Current team: Sloboda Tuzla (goalkeeping coach)

Youth career
- –1988: Gradina

Senior career*
Years	Team	Apps	(Gls)
1988–1990	Gradina		
1990–1993	Sarajevo		
1993–1996	Gradina		
1996–1999	Sarajevo	98	(0)
1999–2000	Yverdon-Sport	2	(0)
2000	Đerzelez Zenica	0	(0)
2000–2001	Budućnost Banovići	22	(0)
2001–2003	Sarajevo	10	(0)
2003–2006	Sloboda Tuzla	9	(0)

International career
1996–2000	Bosnia and Herzegovina	27	(0)

Managerial career
- 2006–2011: Sloboda Tuzla (goalkeeping coach)
- 2012–2017: Sloboda Tuzla (goalkeeping coach)
- 2017–2020: Tuzla City (goalkeeping coach)
- 2020–2021: Sloboda Tuzla (goalkeeping coach)
- 2021–2022: Tuzla City (goalkeeping coach)
- 2023–: Sloboda Tuzla (goalkeeping coach)
- * Club domestic league appearances and goals

Mirsad Dedić (born 21 February 1968) is a Bosnian retired professional football goalkeeper and current goalkeeping coach of First League of FBiH club Sloboda Tuzla.

== International career ==
Dedić made his debut for Bosnia and Herzegovina in a November 1996 friendly match against Italy and earned a total of 27 caps. His final international was a January 2000 friendly against Qatar.

== Honours ==
=== Player ===
Sarajevo

- First League of Bosnia and Herzegovina: 1998–99
- Bosnian Cup: 1996–97, 1997–98, 2001–02
- Bosnian Supercup: 1997
