= 1994–95 First League of Bosnia and Herzegovina =

Association football competition

Statistics of the First League of Bosnia and Herzegovina in the 1994–95 season.

== Overview ==
It was contested by 22 teams, divided in 3 groups with 6 teams, while the last group consisted of 4 teams. After the group stage, the best 2 teams from each group would go to a preliminary knockout playoff round. The 4 winners of those matches were once again grouped in a single group, and the team which placed first in that group would be declared as the overall winner of that session. The winner in the end was NK Čelik Zenica.

This was the first and only time that the league was played in this format.

== First round ==
Key to colours in group tables
Best two teams in each group advance to the Play-off

=== Group Sarajevo ===
Pos	Team	Pld	W	D	L	GF	GA	GD	Pts	Qualification
1	Zmaj od Bosne	5	4	1	0	11	1	+10	13	Qualification to play-off
2	Željezničar	5	4	0	1	9	5	+4	12	Qualification to play-off
3	Rudar Breza	5	3	0	2	13	6	+7	9	
4	Budućnost	5	1	2	2	4	9	−5	5	
5	Usora	5	1	1	3	7	12	−5	4	
6	ZSK Zenica	5	0	0	5	3	14	−11	0	

15 July 1994
Zmaj od Bosne	3–1	Rudar Breza
Željezničar	2–1	Usora
Budućnost	3–0	ZSK Zenica
17 July 1994
Rudar Breza	3–0	ZSK Zenica
Usora	1–1	Budućnost
Zmaj od Bosne	3–0	Željezničar
19 July 1994
Budućnost	0–5	Rudar Breza
ZSK Zenica	1–3	Željezničar
Usora	0–3	Zmaj od Bosne
21 July 1994
Rudar Breza	4–2	Usora
Zmaj od Bosne	2–0	ZSK Zenica
Željezničar	3–0	Budućnost
23 July 1994
Željezničar	1–0	Rudar Breza
Budućnost	0–0	Zmaj od Bosne
ZSK Zenica	2–3	Usora

=== Group Jablanica ===
Pos	Team	Pld	W	D	L	GF	GA	GD	Pts	Qualification
1	Sarajevo	5	5	0	0	18	1	+17	15	Qualification to play-off
2	Bosna	5	2	2	1	6	4	+2	8	Qualification to play-off
3	Radnički Lukavac	5	2	1	2	5	5	0	7	
4	Vrbanjuša	5	1	1	3	2	4	−2	4	
5	Rudar Kakanj	5	1	1	3	2	9	−7	4	
6	Iskra Bugojno	5	1	1	3	4	14	−10	4	

15 July 1994
Sarajevo	5–0	Rudar Kakanj
Bosna	0–0	Vrbanjuša
Lukavac	2–0	Iskra Bugojno
17 July 1994
Rudar Kakanj	1–1	Iskra Bugojno
Bosna	1–1	Lukavac
Sarajevo	1–0	Vrbanjuša
19 July 1994
Rudar Kakanj	0–1	Bosna
Sarajevo	6–1	Iskra Bugojno
Vrbanjuša	1–0	Lukavac
21 July 1994
Lukavac	2–0	Rudar Kakanj
Iskra Bugojno	2–1	Vrbanjuša
Bosna	0–3	Sarajevo
23 July 1994
Lukavac	0–3 (w/o)	Sarajevo
Rudar Kakanj	1–0	Vrbanjuša
Iskra Bugojno	0–4	Bosna

=== Group Tuzla ===
Pos	Team	Pld	W	D	L	GF	GA	GD	Pts	Qualification
1	Sloboda Tuzla	5	4	0	1	20	7	+13	12	Qualification to play-off
2	Gradina Srebrenik	5	3	1	1	16	8	+8	10	Qualification to play-off
3	Olimpik	4	2	1	1	5	7	−2	7	
4	Natron	4	2	0	2	9	11	−2	6	
5	Travnik	5	1	1	3	10	22	−12	4	
6	Turbina	5	0	1	4	4	9	−5	1	

15 July 1994
Olimpik	1–5	Sloboda Tuzla
Gradina Srebrenik	0–0	Turbina
Natron	4–1	Travnik
17 July 1994
Sloboda Tuzla	7–0	Travnik
Turbina	1–2	Natron
Olimpik	2–1	Gradina Srebrenik
19 July 1994
Natron	3–4	Sloboda Tuzla
Travnik	4–7	Gradina
Turbina	0–1	Olimpik
21 July 1994
Sloboda Tuzla	2–0	Turbina
Olimpik	1–1	Travnik
Gradina Srebrenik	5–0	Natron
23 July 1994
Gradina Srebrenik	3–2	Sloboda Tuzla
Natron	n.p.	Olimpik
Travnik	4–3	Turbina

=== Group Zenica ===
Pos	Team	Pld	W	D	L	GF	GA	GD	Pts	Qualification
1	Čelik	3	3	0	0	13	3	+10	9	Qualification to play-off
2	Slaven Živinice	3	1	1	1	4	3	+1	4	Qualification to play-off
3	Rudar Zenica	3	1	1	1	2	4	−2	4	
4	Velež	3	0	0	3	2	11	−9	0	

15 July 1994
Čelik	4–0	Rudar Zenica
Slaven Živinice	3–0	Velež
17 July 1994
Rudar Zenica	2–0	Velež
Čelik	3–1	Slaven Živinice
19 July 1994
Slaven Živinice	0–0	Rudar Zenica
Čelik	6–2	Velež

== Play-off ==
- Played in Zenica.

=== Preliminary round ===
Played on 4 and 5 August 1994.

Team 1	Score	Team 2
Sarajevo	3–0	Slaven Živinice
Čelik	1–0	Gradina Srebrenik
Sloboda Tuzla	1–2	Bosna
Željezničar	4–2	Zmaj od Bosne

=== Final ===
Pos	Team	Pld	W	D	L	GF	GA	GD	Pts
1	Čelik (C)	3	3	0	0	7	3	+4	9
2	Sarajevo	3	1	1	1	3	4	−1	4
3	Bosna	3	1	0	2	2	3	−1	3
4	Željezničar	3	0	1	2	4	6	−2	1

(C) Champions

8 August 1994
Sarajevo	1–0	Bosna
Čelik	3–2	Željezničar
11 August 1994
Bosna	2–1	Željezničar
Čelik	3–1	Sarajevo
14 August 1994
Čelik	1–0	Bosna
Željezničar	1–1	Sarajevo
