= Tuzla oil field =

Oilfield in Bosnia and Herzegovina

Tuzla
- Location within Bosnia and Herzegovina
- Country: Bosnia and Herzegovina
- Region: Tuzla Canton
- Offshore/onshore: onshore
- Coordinates: 44°32′00″N 18°40′00″E
- Operator: Energopetrol

Field history
- Discovery: 2004

Production
- Current production of oil: 0 barrels per day (~0 t/a)
- Estimated oil in place: 50 million tonnes (~ 57×10^{6} m^{3} or 360 million bbl)

The Tuzla oil field is an oil field located in Tuzla, Tuzla Canton. It was discovered in 2004 and developed by Energopetrol. The total proven reserves of the Tuzla oil field are around 360 million barrels (50 million tonnes), and production is supposed to be centered on 20,000 barrels per day (3,200 m^{3}/d).
