= Seval (given name) =

Seval is a given name. Notable people with the name include:

- Seval Bozova (born 2006), Turkish female handballer
- Seval Kıraç (born 1988), Turkish female footballer
- Ševal Zahirović (born 1972), retired Bosnian-Herzegovinian footballer
