= Alen Avdić =

Bosnian-Herzegovinian footballer (born 1977)

Personal information
- Date of birth: 3 April 1977 (age 49)
- Place of birth: Sarajevo, SFR Yugoslavia
- Height: 1.83 m (6 ft 0 in)
- Position: Forward

Senior career*
Years	Team	Apps	(Gls)
1995–1998	Sarajevo	49	(20)
1998	Sakaryaspor	2	(0)
1998	Sarajevo	2	(0)
1998	Cercle Brugge	19	(3)
1999	Denderleeuw		
1999	Sarajevo	16	(9)
2000	Chemnitzer FC	12	(0)
2001–2004	Suwon Bluewings	5	(1)
2002	→ Avispa Fukuoka (loan)	24	(10)
2004	→ Liaoning Zhongyu (loan)	16	(7)
2005–2006	Sarajevo	21	(9)
2006–2008	Saba Battery	41	(8)
2008–2009	Bargh Shiraz	15	(1)
2009–2011	Sarajevo	45	(9)

International career
1998–1999	Bosnia and Herzegovina U21	7	(1)
1999	Bosnia and Herzegovina	3	(0)
- * Club domestic league appearances and goals

Alen Avdić (born 3 April 1977) is a Bosnian-Herzegovinian former professional footballer who played as a forward

== Club career ==
Avdić was active for Saba Battery FC in Iran's Premier Football League, Cercle Brugge and FC Denderleeuw in Belgian second division, Chemnitzer FC in the 2. Bundesliga, Avispa Fukuoka of J2 League and Suwon Samsung Bluewings of K-league. In 2009, he returned to his country and signed for the best known Bosnian football team, FK Sarajevo. He scored the second goal in the second leg match against Helsingborgs IF in the UEFA Europa League third round. FK Sarajevo won 2–1, 5–4 after penalty shootout.

== International career ==
Avdić made his debut for Bosnia and Herzegovina in a March 1999 friendly match against Hungary and has earned a total of three caps, scoring no goals. His final international was an October 1999 European Championship qualification match against Estonia.

== Career statistics ==
=== Club ===
Appearances and goals by club, season and competition
Club	Season	League		
Club	Season	Division	Apps	Goals
Sarajevo	1995–96	Bosnian Premier League		
Sarajevo	1996–97	Bosnian Premier League		
Sarajevo	1997–98	Bosnian Premier League		14
Sarajevo	Total			14
Sakaryaspor	1998–99	1.Lig	2	0
Cercle Brugge	1998–99	Second Division	19	3
Sarajevo	1999–2000	Bosnian Premier League		
Chemnitzer FC	2000–01	2. Bundesliga	12	0
Suwon Samsung Bluewings	2001	K-League	5	1
Suwon Samsung Bluewings	2002	K-League	3	0
Suwon Samsung Bluewings	2003	K-League	2	0
Suwon Samsung Bluewings	Total		10	1
Avispa Fukuoka (loan)	2002	J2 League	24	10
Liaoning (loan)	2004	Chinese Super League	16	7
Sarajevo	2004–05	Bosnian Premier League	9	1
Sarajevo	2005–06	Bosnian Premier League	12	8
Sarajevo	Total		21	9
Saba Qom F.C.	2006–07	Iran Pro League	19	6
Saba Qom F.C.	2007–08	Iran Pro League	22	2
Saba Qom F.C.	Total		41	8
Bargh Shiraz	2008–09	Iran Pro League	15	1
Sarajevo	2009–10	Bosnian Premier League	22	5
Sarajevo	2010–11	Bosnian Premier League	27	5
Sarajevo	Total		49	10
Career total			209	63

=== International ===
Appearances and goals by national team and year
National team	Year	Apps	Goals
Bosnia and Herzegovina	1999	3	0
Total		3	0
