= SpVgg Beckum =

German football club

- Full name: Beckumer Spielvereinigung e.V. 10/23
- Ground: Römerkampfbahn
- League: Landesliga Westfalen (Group 4) (VII)
- 2015–16: Bezirksliga Westfalen (VIII), 1st (promoted)
Home colours	Away colours

SpVgg Beckum is a German association football club from the city of Beckum, North Rhine-Westphalia. The team first came to note as a third-division side following the formation of the Bundesliga (I) in 1963.

== History ==
The club was formed 1 January 1929 out of the merger of Verein für Bewegungsspiele 1910 Beckum and Spiel- und Sportverein 1923 Beckum. Shortly after its founding VfB adopted the name Fußball Club Westfalia 1910 Beckum until returning to their original name in 1916.

In 1963 SpVgg became part of the Amateurliga Westfalen (III) but was relegated after just two seasons. They returned to the Amateurliga in 1971 where they competed as a lower table side until again being demoted in 1979.

The team was absent from Amateurliga play for a decade until returning to what had become the Amateuroberliga Westfalen (III). They continued to play as an unremarked lower-level side and slipped to fourth-tier play in the Oberliga Westfalen in 1994 when German football was reorganized and the new third division Regionalliga introduced. Beckum's best result came in 1995 when they finished in third place. They also made appearances in the opening rounds of play for the DFB-Pokal (German Cup) in 1993 and 1996.

In 2001 Beckum was relegated from the Oberliga, and in the next year reached the lowest point in the club's history when they withdrew from the Verbandsliga (V) and restarted in the Kreisliga, achieving three promotions in the next four seasons to return to the Landesliga Westfalen.

The club played for a season in the tier eight Bezirksliga Westfalen after relegation from the Landesliga in 2015 but won the league and returned the seventh tier.

== Seasons ==
Season	League	Place	Result
2000–01	Oberliga Westfalen (IV)	18th	↓
2001–02	Verbandsliga Westfalen (V)	16th	↓
2002–03	Kreisliga B Beckum (IX)	1st	↑
2003–04	Kreisliga A Beckum (VIII)	2nd	↑
2004–05	Bezirksliga Group 9 (VII)	4th	
2005–06	Bezirksliga Group 9 (VII)	1st	↑
2006–07	Landesliga Group 5 (VI)	8th	
2007–08	Landesliga Group 5 (VI)	6th	
2008–09	Landesliga Group 5 (VII)	9th	
2009–10	Landesliga Group 5 (VII)	7th	
2010–11	Landesliga Group 5 (VII)	12th	
2011–12	Landesliga Group 5 (VII)	10th	
2012–13	Landesliga Group 4 (VII)	6th	
2013–14	Landesliga Group 4 (VII)	6th	
2014–15	Landesliga Group 4 (VII)	15th	↓
2015–16	Bezirksliga Westfalen (VIII)	16th	↑

== Famous players ==
- (Bosnia and Herzegovina) Elvedin Beganović
- (Russia) Sergey Dmitriyev
- (Bosnia and Herzegovina) Emir Tufek
