= 1996–97 First League of the Republika Srpska =

The 1996–97 First League of the Republika Srpska was the 2nd season since establishment. Since Football Association of Republika Srpska is not a member of UEFA nor FIFA, league champion did not qualify for European tournament.

== Group East ==
=== League table ===
Pos	Team	Pld	W	D	L	GF	GA	GD	Pts	Qualification or relegation
1	Rudar Ugljevik (C)	22	13	3	6	42	22	+20	42	Advanced to final
2	Boksit	22	12	4	6	49	30	+19	40	
3	Glasinac	22	12	3	7	61	37	+24	39	
4	Panteri Bijeljina	22	11	3	8	37	25	+12	36	
5	Mladost Rogatica	22	11	1	10	34	38	−4	34	
6	Sarajevo (East)	22	10	3	9	27	23	+4	33	
7	Leotar	22	10	2	10	36	35	+1	32	
8	Sutjeska Srbinje (R)	22	9	2	11	23	36	−13	29	Relegation to Second League RS
9	Bratstvo Bratunac (R)	22	7	4	11	36	44	−8	25	Relegation to Second League RS
10	Slavija (R)	22	7	4	11	18	34	−16	25	Relegation to Second League RS
11	Velež Nevesinje (R)	22	7	3	12	22	36	−14	24	Relegation to Second League RS
12	Jedinstvo Brčko (R)	22	6	2	14	19	44	−25	20	Relegation to Second League RS

Source: BiHSoccer.com, RSSSF.org
Rules for classification: 1) points; 2) goal difference; 3) number of goals scored.
(C) Champions; (R) Relegated

== Group West ==
=== League table ===
Pos	Team	Pld	W	D	L	GF	GA	GD	Pts	Qualification or relegation
1	Sloga Trn	22	15	5	2	43	19	+24	50	Advanced to final
2	Borac Banja Luka	22	11	6	5	32	16	+16	39	
3	Sloga Doboj	22	11	3	8	31	28	+3	36	
4	Rudar Prijedor	22	10	5	7	35	18	+17	35	
5	Borac Šamac	22	10	5	7	25	20	+5	35	
6	Polet	22	10	4	8	27	25	+2	34	
7	Kozara	22	10	3	9	27	27	0	33	
8	Krila Krajine (R)	22	8	6	8	25	27	−2	30	Relegation to Second League RS
9	Omladinac Brestovčina (R)	22	7	4	11	24	42	−18	25	Relegation to Second League RS
10	Borac Kozarska Dubica (R)	22	5	4	13	20	38	−18	19	Relegation to Second League RS
11	BSK (R)	22	4	4	14	18	33	−15	16	Relegation to Second League RS
12	Ljubić (R)	22	3	7	12	13	36	−23	16	Relegation to Second League RS

Source: BiHSoccer.com, RSSSF.org
Rules for classification: 1) points; 2) goal difference; 3) number of goals scored.
(R) Relegated

== Final ==
=== First leg ===
21 June 1997

Rudar Ugljevik	2–0	Sloga Trn
Petrović 68'; Mlađenović 80'	Report

Gradski stadion, Ugljevik
Attendance: 6,000

=== Second leg ===
25 June 1997

Sloga Trn	1–0	Rudar Ugljevik
Zgonjanin 87'	Report

Gradski stadion, Banja Luka
Attendance: 2,500

Rudar Ugljevik won 2–1 on aggregate.

== See also ==
- 1996–97 First League of Bosnia and Herzegovina
