= Džemo Smječanin =

Bosnian footballer (born 1972)

Personal information
- Full name: Džemal Smječanin
- Date of birth: 6 June 1972 (age 54)
- Place of birth: Sarajevo, SFR Yugoslavia
- Height: 1.87 m (6 ft 2 in)
- Position: Forward

Youth career
- Sarajevo

Senior career*
Years	Team	Apps	(Gls)
1995–1996	Korotan Prevalje	21	(3)
1996–1999	Sarajevo	89	(32)
1999–2000	Đerzelez	29	(25)
2000–2001	Rot-Weiss Essen	21	(0)
2001–2002	Zuid-West-Vlaanderen	11	(2)
2002–2003	Sarajevo	18	(3)
Total		189	(66)

International career
1997	Bosnia and Herzegovina	6	(1)

Managerial career
- 2020–2021: UNIS Vogošća (assistant)
- * Club domestic league appearances and goals

Džemal "Džemo" Smječanin (born 6 June 1972) is a Bosnian retired professional footballer who played as a forward.

== Club career ==
Born in Sarajevo, SFR Yugoslavia, present day Bosnia and Herzegovina, Smječanin started playing football in the youth teams of hometown club by the same name, Sarajevo. His first professional contract that he signed was with now defunct Slovenian club Korotan Prevalje in the summer of 1995. He spent one season playing in Slovenia, before coming back to Bosnia and Herzegovina and signing with his favourite Sarajevo in 1996. Smječanin played for three years at Sarajevo, winning two Bosnian Cups, one Bosnian Supercup and one league title during that time.

In 1999, he joined Đerzelez, and in the season 1999–2000 scored 25 league goals for the club, making him joint-top goalscorer of the league. From 2000 until 2002, Smječanin played abroad at German and Belgium clubs Rot-Weiss Essen and Zuid-West-Vlaanderen. However, after leaving Đerzelez, he was not able to get back to his goalscoring ways for the rest of his career, scoring only 2 league goals in the two years that he played at Essen and Vlaanderen.

In June 2002, Smječanin came back to Sarajevo, playing one more season for his boyhood club before retiring from football in June 2003 after the end of the 2002–03 league season.

== International career ==
Showing good games at Sarajevo, Smječanin was called up to the Bosnia and Herzegovina national team squad for the 1997 Dunhill Cup in Malaysia by national team head coach Fuad Muzurović. He played all five games at the Cup, scoring one goal against Vietnam in a 4–0 win on 22 February 1997. Smječanin played his last game for the national team against Tunisia in a 2–1 loss on 5 November 1997.

== Career statistics ==
=== International ===
National team	Year	Apps	Goals
Bosnia and Herzegovina
Bosnia and Herzegovina	1997	6	1
Total		6	1

=== International goals ===
Goal	Date	Venue	Opponent	Score	Result	Competition
1.	22 February 1997	Stadium Merdeka, Kuala Lumpur, Vietnam	Vietnam	3–0	4–0	1997 Dunhill Cup

== Honours ==
=== Player ===
Sarajevo

- Bosnian First League: 1998–99
- Bosnian Cup: 1996–97, 1997–98
- Bosnian Supercup: 1997

Individual

- Bosnian First League top scorer: 1999–2000 (shared)
