= 1995–96 Bosnia and Herzegovina Football Cup =

Tournament details
- Country: Bosnia and Herzegovina

Final positions
- Champions: Čelik
- Runners-up: Sloboda Tuzla

1995–96 Bosnia and Herzegovina Football Cup was the second season of the Bosnia and Herzegovina's annual football cup. The Cup was won by Čelik Zenica who defeated Sloboda Tuzla in the final.

== Quarter-finals ==
The matches were played on 10 April 1996.

Team 1	Score	Team 2
Čelik Zenica	6–0	Jedinstvo Bihać
Iskra Bugojno	2–5	Travnik
Sloboda Tuzla	3–0	Mladost Gacko
Sarajevo	4–1	Radnički Goražde

== Semi-finals ==
The matches were played on 15 May 1996.

Team 1	Score	Team 2
Sarajevo	0–0 (5–6 p)	Čelik Zenica
Sloboda Tuzla	5–1	Travnik

== Final ==
12 June 1996
16:30

Čelik Zenica	2–1 (a.e.t.)	Sloboda Tuzla
Bujak 16'; Tumbić 110' (pen.)	Report	Omerović 28'

Stadion Grbavica, Sarajevo
Referee: Salem Prolić

GK
CB
CB
CB
RWB
LWB
CM
CM
AM
CF
CF
Substitutes:
Manager:
(Bosnia and Herzegovina) Nermin Hadžiahmetović

(Bosnia and Herzegovina) Nijaz Hrustanović
(Bosnia and Herzegovina) Edin Smajić
(Bosnia and Herzegovina) Amir Japaur	Booked
(Bosnia and Herzegovina) Senad Begić	Booked
(Bosnia and Herzegovina) Miralem Nalić
(Bosnia and Herzegovina) Ekrem Bradarić	Booked
(Bosnia and Herzegovina) Amir Tumbić
(Bosnia and Herzegovina) Almir Hodžić (c)
(Bosnia and Herzegovina) Sabahudin Bujak	Booked	(substituted off) 87'
(Bosnia and Herzegovina) Benjamin Terzić	(substituted off) 104'
(Bosnia and Herzegovina) Jasmin Memišević	(substituted off) 91'
(Bosnia and Herzegovina) Izudin Hadžiahmetović	Booked	(substituted on) 87'
(Bosnia and Herzegovina) Nizah Hukić	(substituted on) 91'
(Bosnia and Herzegovina) Zikret Kuljanović	(substituted on) 104'

GK	(Bosnia and Herzegovina) Amir Halilović
RB	(Bosnia and Herzegovina) Nermin Hasić
CB	(Bosnia and Herzegovina) Omer Joldić	Booked
CB	(Bosnia and Herzegovina) Zvijezdan Krešić
LB	(Bosnia and Herzegovina) Sakib Malkočević (c)	Booked Sent off (straight red)
RM	(Bosnia and Herzegovina) Nedžad Bajrović
CM	(Bosnia and Herzegovina) Vedin Musić	Booked
CM	(Bosnia and Herzegovina) Kabir Smajić	Booked
LM	(Bosnia and Herzegovina) Muhamed Tahirović		(substituted off) 115'
SS	(Bosnia and Herzegovina) Midhat Hadžić	Booked Sent off (straight red)
CF	(Bosnia and Herzegovina) Nedim Omerović
Substitutes:
	(Bosnia and Herzegovina) Samir Kuduzović		(substituted on) 115'
Manager:
(Bosnia and Herzegovina) Mustafa Hukić

Match officials

- Assistant referees:
  - Mustafa Tabak
  - Hamid Lindov

== See also ==
- 1995–96 First League of Bosnia and Herzegovina
