= Ervin Smajlagić =

Bosnian footballer

Ervin Smailagić
Personal information
- Full name: Ervin Smailagić
- Date of birth: 7 March 1976 (age 50)
- Place of birth: , SFR Yugoslavia
- Position: Defender

Senior career*
Years	Team	Apps	(Gls)
1995-1997	Jedinstvo Bihać	59	(10)
1998	Hajduk Split	2	(0)
1998	Cibalia	2	(0)
1999	FK Sarajevo	10	(0)
1999-2002	Jedinstvo Bihać	97	(9)
2003	Željezničar	20	(3)
2004-2005	Croatia Sesvete		
2005-2006	Naftaš Ivanić Grad		
2006	Orašje	6	(0)
2007	Hrvatski Dragovoljac		
2007-2010	Jedinstvo Bihać		
2010-2011	Krajina Cazin		

International career^{‡}
2001	Bosnia and Herzegovina	1	(0)
2001	Bosnia and Herzegovina XI	1	(0)

Managerial career
- –2014: Jedinstvo Bihać
- * Club domestic league appearances and goals ‡ National team caps and goals as of 23 June 2021

Ervin Smailagić (born 7 March 1976) is a Bosnian retired football player.

== Playing career ==
=== International ===
Smailagić made two senior appearances for Bosnia and Herzegovina, both (one unofficial) at the 2001 LG Cup where he played in the final against Iran.

== Managerial career ==
He was dismissed as manager of Jedinstvo Bihać and replaced by Ahmet Kečalović in April 2014.
