= Senad Begić =

Bosnian footballer

Personal information
- Full name: Senad Begić
- Date of birth: 10 October 1969 (age 57)
- Place of birth: Zenica, SFR Yugoslavia
- Position: Defender

Senior career*
Years	Team	Apps	(Gls)
1994–1997	Čelik Zenica	25+	(2+)
1998–1999	FK Sarajevo	49	(6)
2000–2003	Čelik Zenica	68	(12)

International career^{‡}
1995-1997	Bosnia and Herzegovina	12	(0)
- * Club domestic league appearances and goals ‡ National team caps and goals as of 12 June 2021

Senad Begić (born 10 October 1969) is a Bosnian retired football player.

== Club career ==
He played for Čelik Zenica in their 2001 UEFA Intertoto Cup shock home win over Belgian side AA Gent. He also won the 1996 Bosnia and Herzegovina Cup with them.

== International career ==
Begić made his debut in Bosnia and Herzegovina's first ever official international game, a November 1995 friendly match away against Albania, and has earned a total of 12 caps, scoring no goals. His final international was a March 1997 Dunhill Cup match against China.
