= Faruk Ihtijarević =

Bosnian footballer (born 1976)

Personal information
- Date of birth: 1 May 1976 (age 50)
- Place of birth: Visoko, SFR Yugoslavia
- Height: 1.83 m (6 ft 0 in)
- Position: Midfielder

Youth career
- 1982–1996: Bosna Visoko

Senior career*
Years	Team	Apps	(Gls)
1996	Bosna Visoko		
1996–1999	Sarajevo	63	(6)
2000	Željezničar		
2001	Maribor	7	(0)
2001–2002	Zadar	5	(0)
2002–2007	Sarajevo	70	(4)
2007–2008	PAS Hamedan	33	(0)
2008–2011	Sarajevo	45	(5)
Total		223	(15)

International career
1996-1999	Bosnia and Herzegovina U21	4	(0)
1999–2000	Bosnia and Herzegovina	9	(1)
- * Club domestic league appearances and goals

Faruk Ihtijarević (born 1 May 1976) is a Bosnian former professional footballer who played as a midfielder.

== Club career ==
Ihtijarević had a brief spell with Zadar in the Croatian Croatian First League. Outside of Bosnia and Herzegovina, apart from Zadar, he also played for Slovenian club Maribor and Iranian club PAS Hamedan

Ihtijarević's biggest success was with hometown club Bosna Visoko, Maribor and Sarajevo. For Sarajevo he made over 100 league appearances.

== International career ==
Ihtijarević made his debut for Bosnia and Herzegovina in a January 1999 friendly match away against Malta and has earned a total of 9 caps, scoring 1 goal. His final international was a March 2000 friendly against Macedonia.

=== International goals ===
#	Date	Venue	Opponent	Score	Result	Competition
1.	15 March 2000	Prince Mohammed Stadium, Zarqa, Jordan	Jordan	0–1	1–2	Friendly

== Honours ==
=== Player ===
Sarajevo

- Bosnian First League: 1998–99
- Bosnian Premier League: 2006–07
- Bosnian Cup: 1996–97, 1997–98, 2004–05
- Bosnian Supercup: 1997

Maribor

- Slovenian PrvaLiga: 2000–01
