= 1995–96 First League of Bosnia and Herzegovina =

Association football competition

Statistics of First League of Bosnia and Herzegovina in the 1995–96 season. It was contested only by Bosniak clubs. Serbian clubs played in the 1995–96 First League of the Republika Srpska and the Croatian clubs in the 1995–96 First League of Herzeg-Bosnia.

== Overview ==
It was contested by 16 teams, and NK Čelik Zenica won the championship.

== Final table ==
Pos	Team	Pld	W	D	L	GF	GA	GD	Pts	Qualification or relegation
1	Čelik (C)	30	21	5	4	65	23	+42	68	Champions
2	Lukavac	30	20	4	6	69	22	+47	64	
3	Sloboda Tuzla	30	19	6	5	59	29	+30	63	
4	Zenica	30	15	8	7	45	22	+23	53	
5	Jedinstvo Bihać	30	15	5	10	48	31	+17	50	
6	Rudar Kakanj	30	14	5	11	46	35	+11	47	
7	Sarajevo	30	12	7	11	38	29	+9	43	
8	Rudar Breza	30	13	4	13	36	42	−6	43	
9	Željezničar	30	12	4	14	35	62	−27	40	
10	Zmaj od Bosne	30	11	6	13	52	37	+15	39	
11	Travnik	30	10	7	13	40	43	−3	37	
12	Gradina Srebrenik	30	9	6	15	35	54	−19	33	
13	Turbina	30	9	4	17	26	54	−28	31	
14	Velež	30	8	3	19	30	61	−31	27	
15	Olimpik (R)	30	5	5	20	27	57	−30	20	Relegation to Second League of Bosnia and Herzegovina
16	Iskra (R)	30	4	7	19	16	66	−50	19	Relegation to Second League of Bosnia and Herzegovina

Source: RSSSF.org
(C) Champions; (R) Relegated

== Results ==
Home \ Away	ČEL	GRA	ISK	JED	LUK	OLI	RBR	RKA	SAR	SLO	TRA	TUR	VEL	ZEN	ZMA	ŽEL
Čelik		6–0	6–0	2–0	2–1	3–2	1–0	3–0	2–0	2–2	2–1	4–0	3–0	0–0	1–0	4–0
Gradina Srebrenik	2–5		4–0	0–2	1–1	4–2	2–1	3–1	1–1	1–1	1–0	2–0	1–0	0–1	2–0	5–1
Iskra	1–1	2–0		0–1	1–1	0–0	0–0	0–2	2–1	0–4	0–0	1–0	3–1	0–0	0–0	0–3
Jedinstvo Bihać	1–1	2–1	4–0		2–0	6–0	2–0	3–0	1–0	1–3	4–1	3–0	3–1	1–1	1–0	5–0
Lukavac	3–1	4–0	3–0	3–0		3–0	2–0	2–1	3–1	0–0	3–1	5–0	12–1	3–1	1–0	4–0
Olimpik	1–2	2–0	3–0	1–1	1–2		0–1	2–0	1–2	0–1	1–1	3–2	2–1	0–2	0–1	1–2
Rudar Breza	0–0	2–1	5–2	2–0	2–3	2–0		2–0	1–0	1–0	2–2	2–0	3–2	1–1	2–1	3–0
Rudar Kakanj	0–3	6–0	2–0	2–2	1–0	1–0	3–0		2–0	3–0	2–0	4–1	3–0	1–0	5–0	2–1
Sarajevo	2–0	0–0	1–0	3–1	1–0	1–0	3–0	0–0		5–1	1–2	4–1	0–0	0–1	1–0	5–0
Sloboda Tuzla	1–4	6–1	1–0	1–0	1–1	3–0	3–0	2–0	1–0		4–0	1–0	5–2	1–1	3–2	5–0
Travnik	0–3	1–1	2–1	3–1	0–1	2–2	2–0	0–0	3–2	1–2		2–0	3–1	1–1	2–1	4–0
Turbina	0–1	2–1	3–0	0–1	1–0	3–1	0–3	2–0	1–1	1–1	3–2		1–1	1–0	1–0	1–0
Velež	0–1	0–0	3–2	1–0	0–2	2–0	2–0	3–0	3–0	0–1	0–3	2–0		1–0	0–2	0–1
Zenica	1–2	2–0	3–0	2–0	2–1	7–2	3–0	1–1	1–2	2–0	1–0	3–0	2–0		3–1	1–1
Zmaj od Bosne	1–0	1–0	9–1	1–1	0–2	0–0	5–0	3–3	0–0	0–3	2–1	5–0	6–2	1–0		9–1
Željezničar	4–1	2–1	3–0	2–0	1–3	2–0	3–1	1–0	1–1	0–1	2–1	0–0	2–1	1–2	1–1	

Source: RSSSF.org
Legend: Blue = home team win; Yellow = draw; Red = away team win.

== Top goalscorers ==
Rank	Scorer	Club	Goals
1	(Bosnia and Herzegovina) Amir Osmanović	Lukavac	27
2	(Bosnia and Herzegovina) Halim Stupac	Jedinstvo Bihać	20
3	(Bosnia and Herzegovina) Sead Osmić	Lukavac	18
4	(Bosnia and Herzegovina) Nedim Omerović	Sloboda Tuzla	17
5	(Bosnia and Herzegovina) Almir Jašarspahić	Rudar Kakanj	14
5	(Bosnia and Herzegovina) Adnan Dedić	Rudar Breza	14
7	(Bosnia and Herzegovina) Šehalija Šehrić	Gradina	13
8	(Bosnia and Herzegovina) Sabahudin Bujak	Čelik Zenica	12
8	(Bosnia and Herzegovina) Asim Hrnjić	Zenica	12
10	(Bosnia and Herzegovina) Vedin Musić	Sloboda Tuzla	11
10	(Bosnia and Herzegovina) Džemal Pačariz	Rudar Kakanj	11
10	(Bosnia and Herzegovina) Jasmin Mešić	Zmaj od Bosne	11
10	(Bosnia and Herzegovina) Islam Torlak	Travnik	11

- Source: SportSport.ba forum

== See also ==
- 1995–96 First League of the Republika Srpska
