= Energopetrol =

Energopetrol is a Bosnian oil company based in Sarajevo. It was founded in the 1960s as a part of the Energoinvest corporation. Its logo includes the orange letters "EP" in a serif font surrounded by an orange circle.

Due to large debt and general failure of management, the government of Bosnia and Herzegovina, as majority owner, privatized 67% of its stake within the company. The Croatian-Hungarian company INA-MOL had acquired the shares for 220 million Bosnian Marks (100 million dollars). The INA-MOL consortium had acquired 67 gas stations and two office buildings belonging to Energopetrol in Sarajevo. The consortium had promised to keep the present labor force, the name (Energopetrol), and turn the company into a regional giant. The government had decided to keep the former Energopetrol Terminals into a new state owned corporation Terminali FBiH. The government also decided to keep the Hotel Marsal within its control.

== Ownership structure ==
Current shareholders are:

- INA-MOL - 67%
- Government of FBiH - 22%
- Small Shareholders - 11%
