= Dženan Hošić =

Bosnian football manager (born 1976)

Personal information
- Date of birth: 13 March 1976 (age 50)
- Place of birth: Sarajevo, SFR Yugoslavia
- Height: 1.85 m (6 ft 1 in)
- Position: Defender

Youth career
- Famos Hrasnica

Senior career*
Years	Team	Apps	(Gls)
1997–1999	Sarajevo	79	(2)
2000–2002	Anzhi Makhachkala	36	(1)
2003–2004	Szczakowianka Jaworzno	54	(2)
2005–2008	Zagłębie Sosnowiec	97	(5)
2009	Velež Mostar	17	(1)
2009–2010	Zagłębie Sosnowiec	31	(2)
Total		314	(13)

International career
- Bosnia and Herzegovina U21
2000	Bosnia and Herzegovina	1	(0)

Managerial career
- 2014–2017: Famos Hrasnica
- 2020–2021: Goražde
- 2021: Vis Simm-Bau
- 2022: GOŠK Gabela
- 2022: Zvijezda 09
- 2023: Goražde
- 2024: TOŠK Tešanj
- 2024–2025: Sarajevo U19
- * Club domestic league appearances and goals

Dženan Hošić (born 13 March 1976) is a Bosnian professional football manager and former player.

== International career ==
Hošić made his debut for Bosnia and Herzegovina in a March 2000 friendly game away against Jordan. It remained his sole international appearance.

== Managerial statistics ==
As of match played 4 December 2025

Managerial record by team and tenure
Team	From	To	Record							
Team	From	To	G	W	D	L	GF	GA	GD	Win %
Goražde	28 August 2020	18 May 2021	25	13	6	6	37	30	+7	52.00
Vis Simm-Bau	17 August 2021	7 November 2021	12	2	5	5	11	11	+0	16.67
GOŠK Gabela	28 March 2022	3 May 2022	5	3	2	0	9	3	+6	60.00
Zvijezda 09	20 June 2022	12 September 2022	7	4	1	2	10	7	+3	57.14
Goražde	14 March 2023	30 June 2023	13	8	2	3	20	12	+8	61.54
TOŠK Tešanj	11 January 2024	15 June 2024	15	8	1	6	20	18	+2	53.33
Sarajevo U19	15 June 2024	12 December 2025	45	27	10	8	105	49	+56	60.00
Total			122	65	27	30	212	130	+82	53.28

== Honours ==
=== Player ===
Sarajevo

- Bosnian First League: 1998–99
- Bosnian Cup: 1997–98
- Bosnian Supercup: 1997
