= Nedžad Fazlagić =

Bosnian footballer

Personal information
- Date of birth: 30 November 1974 (age 51)
- Place of birth: Sarajevo, SFR Yugoslavia
- Height: 1.85 m (6 ft 1 in)
- Position: Midfielder

Senior career*
Years	Team	Apps	(Gls)
1993-1995	FK Sarajevo		

International career
1995	Bosnia and Herzegovina	1	(0)
- * Club domestic league appearances and goals

Nedžad Fazlagić (born 30 November 1974) is a Bosnian retired international footballer.

== International career ==
He made his debut in Bosnia and Herzegovina's first ever official international game, a November 1995 friendly match away against Albania. It remained his sole official international appearance. He had earlier played in an unofficial game against Iran, in September 1993, in which the team was entirely made up of FK Sarajevo players.
