= Dženan Uščuplić =

Bosnian footballer (1975–2024)

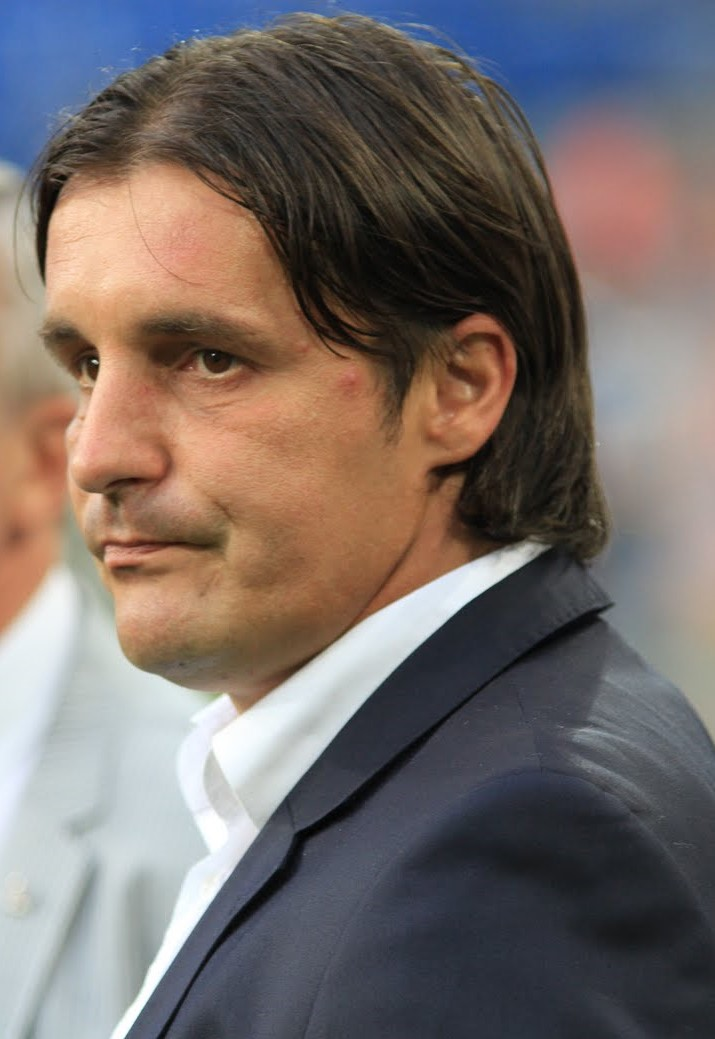
- Uščuplić as Sarajevo manager in 2015

Personal information
- Date of birth: 18 August 1975
- Place of birth: Sarajevo, SR Bosnia and Herzegovina, SFR Yugoslavia
- Date of death: 8 August 2024 (aged 48)
- Place of death: Zelengora, Bosnia and Herzegovina
- Position: Midfielder

Youth career
- –1992: Željezničar

Senior career*
Years	Team	Apps	(Gls)
1992–1998	Sarajevo	84	(20)
2000	Sarajevo	2	(0)
2001	Olimpik	7	(0)
2001–2002	Sarajevo	8	(0)
Total		101	(20)

International career
1996–1997	Bosnia and Herzegovina U21	8	(2)

Managerial career
- 2014: Sarajevo
- 2015: Sarajevo
- 2021: Sarajevo (caretaker)
- 2022: Sarajevo (caretaker)
- * Club domestic league appearances and goals

Dženan Uščuplić (18 August 1975 – 8 August 2024) was a Bosnian professional football manager and player. A midfielder, he was most successful playing for and managing hometown club Sarajevo.

== Playing career ==
As a player of Sarajevo on three occasions, Uščuplić won three Bosnian cup titles and one supercup with the club. He also played for Olimpik. He retired in the summer of 2002 at the age of 27 because of a chronic knee injury sustained in April 1998.

== Managerial career ==
After being forced to retire from football, Uščuplić spent nine years in the Sarajevo youth academy and as an assistant to former first team manager Robert Jarni, before being named manager in 2014. In his debut season he led the club to a cup triumph, ending a seven-season silverware drought. On 26 September 2014, Uščuplić was relieved of his duties as Sarajevo manager after a string of disappointing results, and returned to the club's youth academy where he completed the UEFA Pro Licence program.

On 21 April 2015, he was again named manager of Sarajevo after the club management sacked Meho Kodro. This time Uščuplić led Sarajevo to a league triumph shortly after being named the new manager. On 11 September 2015, Uščuplić and his whole staff were sacked after a series of poor results that culminated with yet another loss, this time against Slavija Sarajevo.

Six years later, on 13 May 2021, he was yet again named as Sarajevo's caretaker manager until the end of the 2020–21 season, after the club agreed to terminate Vinko Marinović's contract by mutual agreement due to poor results in the last few games of the season. In Uščuplić's first game as manager, Sarajevo drew against Mladost Doboj Kakanj in a league game on 16 May 2021. He oversaw his first win as manager against Radnik Bijeljina on 23 May 2021. Three days later, on 26 May, Uščuplić led Sarajevo to yet another Bosnian cup triumph, this time beating Borac Banja Luka in the final.

On 12 May 2022, for a second time in a year, he became Sarajevo's caretaker manager until the end of the 2021–22 season, following Aleksandar Vasoski's resignation. Sarajevo ended the season in 4th place and lost to Velež Mostar in the 2021–22 Bosnian Cup final, failing to qualify to a European competition for a second time in six years.

== Death ==
Uščuplić died on 8 August 2024, at the age of 48. He was struck by lightning during harsh weather conditions while hiking on the Zelengora mountain range in the Sutjeska National Park of Bosnia and Herzegovina.

== Managerial statistics ==
Managerial record by team and tenure
Team	From	To	Record				
Team	From	To	G	W	D	L	Win %
Sarajevo	10 April 2014	26 September 2014	19	11	4	4	57.89
Sarajevo	21 April 2015	10 September 2015	15	10	2	3	66.67
Sarajevo (caretaker)	13 May 2021	31 May 2021	4	3	1	0	75.00
Sarajevo (caretaker)	12 May 2022	1 June 2022	4	1	0	3	25.00
Total			42	25	7	10	59.52

== Honours ==
=== Player ===
Sarajevo

- Bosnian Cup: 1996–97, 1997–98, 2001–02
- Bosnian Supercup: 1997

=== Manager ===
Sarajevo

- Bosnian Premier League: 2014–15
- Bosnian Cup: 2013–14, 2020–21; runner-up: 2021–22
