= Reuf Herco =

Bosnian-Herzegovinian footballer

Personal information
- Date of birth: 16 July 1964 (age 62)
- Place of birth: Breza, SFR Yugoslavia
- Positions: Forward; defender

Senior career*
Years	Team	Apps	(Gls)
1991–1993	Rudar Breza	27	(11)
1995–1998	FK Sarajevo	62	(10)
1998–1999	Unis Vogošća	12	(3)
- * Club domestic league appearances and goals

Reuf Herco (born 16 July 1964 in Breza, SR Bosnia, SFR Yugoslavia ) is a retired Bosnian-Herzegovinian professional footballer.

== Club career ==
Herco played the position of forward for Rudar Breza, FK Sarajevo and Unis Vogošća.

== Personal life ==
After retiring from professional football he established a private football academy in his hometown. Furthermore, he is a board member of Rudar Breza.
