= Ševal Zahirović =

Bosnian-Herzegovina footballer

Personal information
- Full name: Ševal Zahirović
- Date of birth: 2 April 1972 (age 54)
- Place of birth: Kakanj, SFR Yugoslavia
- Height: 1.90 m (6 ft 3 in)
- Position: Forward

Senior career*
Years	Team	Apps	(Gls)
1997–2000	FK Sarajevo	57	(18)
2000–2001	FC Kärnten	6	(1)
2001–2002	→ Rudar Kakanj (loan)	23	(11)
2002–2003	Rudar Velenje	19	(5)
2003–2005	Rudar Kakanj	37	(18)
2006–2009	Sindri Höfn	66	(26)
2009–2010	Rudar Kakanj	29	(9)
2011–2012	Sindri Höfn	9	(4)
2015	Magni Grenivík	1	(0)
2017	Sindri Höfn	1	(0)
Total		237	(88)

International career
1997	Bosnia and Herzegovina	1	(0)
- * Club domestic league appearances and goals

Ševal Zahirović (born 2 April 1972 in Kakanj, SFR Yugoslavia) is a retired Bosnian-Herzegovinian professional footballer.

== Club career ==
Zahirović spent the latter years of his career in the Icelandic lower leagues.

== International career ==
He was capped once for Bosnia and Herzegovina, in a February 1997 Dunhill Cup match against Zimbabwe.
