= Bilino Polje Stadium =

Football stadium in Zenica, Bosnia and Herzegovina

- UEFA
- Interactive map of Bilino Polje Stadium
- Location: Bulevar Kulina Bana bb, Zenica, Bosnia and Herzegovina
- Coordinates: 44°12′20.7″N 17°54′25.5″E
- Owner: City of Zenica
- Capacity: 13,694
- Surface: Hybrid grass
- Scoreboard: LED
- Field size: 105 x 68 m

Construction
- Groundbreaking: 1972
- Opened: 4 October 1972
- Renovated: 2012

Tenants
- NK Čelik Zenica (1972–present); NK Đerzelez Zenica (1999–2001); Bosnia and Herzegovina national football team (1995–present)

Bilino Polje Stadium is an association football stadium in Zenica, Bosnia and Herzegovina. It is the home stadium of local club NK Čelik, as well as being used by the Bosnia and Herzegovina national football team. Sometimes it also hosts the Bosnia and Herzegovina national rugby union team. The stadium has an all-seater capacity of 13,694.

== History ==
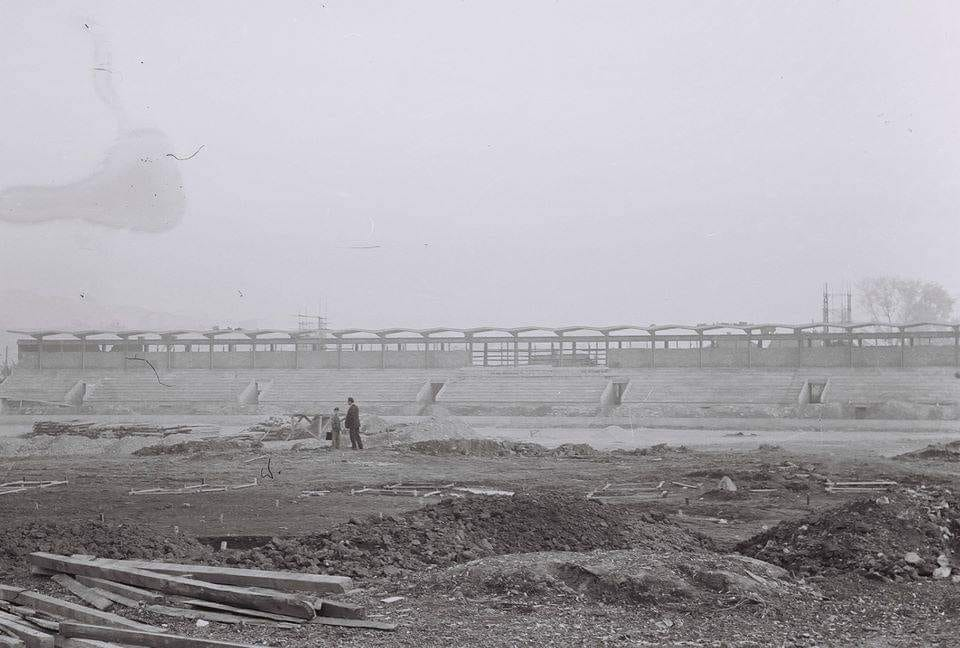
Construction works in 1971. East stands erected are visible in the background

The stadium was built and opened in 1972. It was used in Bosnia and Herzegovina's first match, a friendly played against Albania in 1996 with the final result being a 2–0 win to Albania. The stadium was once considered a "curse" for foreign national teams, because the Bosnian national team usually wins or rarely loses their home games at Bilino Polje stadium. In a period stretching from 1995 to October 2006, Bosnia went undefeated at home in around 15 games played in Zenica. The city of Zenica had to wait another 4 years (1996–2000) before the next match of the national team was played at the stadium. This match was also a friendly, this time against Macedonia, with the final result being a victory for the home side 1–0.

NK Čelik was formed in 1945 as a club and played its home games at Blatuša. At the time, the stadium was mainly built with wooden stands and could have an attendance of 15,600 spectators. Zenica, being an industrial city and having Željezara as the main provider for most of the population of the city, needed to provide some kind of job offer for its hard workers. Now, the decision was made to build a larger stadium since NK Čelik was taking part in the Yugoslav First League.

Bilino Polje was built in a six to eight month period, and was ready for NK Čelik to host European teams in the then Mitropa Cup. At that time, NK Čelik hosted Fiorentina at the stadium in the finals of the Mitropa Cup and won it that year. Also, NK Čelik went on to win the Mitropa Cup the following year as well. A few years after the construction, the stadium was actually given the award for being the most beautiful stadium in Yugoslavia. Bilino Polje has a rectangular shape with British style dimensions, rather than an oval shape such as the Stadium Koševo in Sarajevo, making it a somewhat unusual stadium in Bosnia-Herzegovina.

== Location ==
The stadium is located in the Bilino Polje, urban area of Zenica, and can be easily accessed and navigated to from several points in the city. It is also well connected to the ongoing urban redevelopment of the city's road network.

== Stadium statistics ==
Football matches by the Yugoslavia national football team to 1992:

| Date | Home team | Result | Away team | Competition |
|---|---|---|---|---|
| 17 April 1974 | Yugoslavia | 0–1 | Soviet Union | Friendly |
| 27 March 1985 | Yugoslavia | 1–0 | Luxembourg | 1986 FIFA World Cup qualification |

Football matches by the Bosnia and Herzegovina national football team to date:

Table of games played at Bilino Polje
| GP | W | D | L | GF | GA | GD |
|---|---|---|---|---|---|---|
| 53 | 28 | 16 | 9 | 85 | 32 | +53 |

Table correct as of 19 November 2015.
