= Amar Ferhatović =

Bosnian footballer

Personal information
- Date of birth: 3 May 1977 (age 49)
- Place of birth: Sarajevo, SR Bosnia, SFR Yugoslavia
- Height: 1.73 m (5 ft 8 in)
- Position: Midfielder

Senior career*
Years	Team	Apps	(Gls)
1995–2001	Sarajevo	129	(25)
2001–2002	Brescello	23	(2)
2003–2004	Haladás	10	(1)
2004–2005	Sarajevo	13	(0)
2005	GKS Bełchatów	3	(0)
2006	FK Sarajevo	0	(0)
2007	Vasalund	1	(0)
2008	SAŠK Napredak	1	(0)
Total		179	(28)

International career
1998–1999	Bosnia and Herzegovina U21	6	(1)
2001	Bosnia and Herzegovina	3	(0)
2001	Bosnia and Herzegovina XI	1	(0)
- * Club domestic league appearances and goals

Amar Ferhatović (born 3 May 1977) is a Bosnian former professional footballer who played as an attacking midfielder.

== International career ==
Ferhatović made three appearances for Bosnia and Herzegovina at the 2001 Merdeka Tournament, two games regarded as official ones.

== Honours ==
Sarajevo

- First League of Bosnia and Herzegovina: 1998–99
- Bosnia and Herzegovina Football Cup: 2004–05
