= 1997–98 Bosnia and Herzegovina Football Cup =

Tournament details
- Country: Bosnia and Herzegovina

Final positions
- Champions: Sarajevo; 1st national cup title
- Runners-up: Orašje

1997–98 Bosnia and Herzegovina Football Cup was the fourth season of the Bosnia and Herzegovina's annual football cup. The Cup was won by Sarajevo who defeated Orašje in the super final.

== Overview ==
An agreement was signed between the Football Federation of Bosnia and Herzegovina and the Football Federation of Herzeg-Bosnia to make the final between the winners of the respective cups.

== Bosniak Cup ==
=== Round of 16 ===
The matches were played on 28 February and 1 March 1998.

Team 1	Score	Team 2
Jedinstvo Bihać	0–3	Željezničar
Goražde	0–5	Bosna Visoko
Travnik	0–1	Sloboda Tuzla
Sarajevo	2–0	Olimpik
Rudar Breza	1–1 (3–4 p)	Gradina Srebrenik
Zenica	1–1 (4–3 p)	Zmaj od Bosne
Čelik Zenica	2–2 (3–4 p)	Velež
Misoča Ilijaš	0–2	Lukavac

=== Quarterfinals ===
The first legs were played on 11 March and the second legs were played on 25 March 1998.

Team 1	Agg.	Team 2	1st leg	2nd leg
Sloboda Tuzla	3–1	Bosna Visoko	2–0	1–1
Sarajevo	3–2	Gradina Srebrenik	2–1	1–1
Lukavac	0–2	Velež	0–0	0–2
Zenica	1–1 (6–5 p)	Željezničar	1–0	0–1

=== Semifinals ===
The first legs were played on 8 April and the second legs were played on 22 April 1998.

Team 1	Agg.	Team 2	1st leg	2nd leg
Zenica	0–0 (2–3 p)	Sarajevo	0–0	0–0
Velež	1–2	Sloboda Tuzla	1–0	0–2

=== Final ===
16 May 1998

Sarajevo	1–0 (a.e.t.)	Sloboda Tuzla
Granov 113'

Stadion Koševo, Sarajevo
Attendance: 6,000
Referee: Džemal Čalija (Sarajevo)

== Herzeg-Bosnia Cup ==
=== Final ===
7 June 1998

Široki Brijeg	0–0	Orašje
	Report:
Penalties
S. Bubalo (penalty missed); Kordić (penalty missed); Puljić (penalty scored); Ivić (penalty scored); Z. Bubalo (penalty missed)	2–3	(penalty scored) Pejić; (penalty scored) Neretljak; (penalty scored) P. Mikić; (penalty missed) Klaić

Stadion pod Bijelim Brijegom, Mostar
Attendance: 1,000
Referee: Spomenko Mandić (Ljubuški)

== Super final ==
Team 1	Agg.	Team 2	1st leg	2nd leg
Orašje	0–1	Sarajevo	0–0	0–1

== See also ==
- 1997–98 First League of Bosnia and Herzegovina
