= 1996–97 Bosnia and Herzegovina Football Cup =

Tournament details
- Country: Bosnia and Herzegovina

Final positions
- Champions: Sarajevo
- Runners-up: Željezničar

1996–97 Bosnia and Herzegovina Football Cup was the third season of the Bosnia and Herzegovina's annual football cup. The Cup was won by Sarajevo who defeated Željezničar in the final.

== Quarterfinals ==
The matches were played on 30 April 1997.

Team 1	Score	Team 2
Čelik Zenica	1–0	Đerzelez
Radnik Hadžići	2–4	Željezničar
Vrbanjuša	1–3	Lukavac
Sarajevo	5–0	Budućnost Banovići

== Semifinals ==
The first legs were played on 14 May and the second legs were played on 21 May 1997.

Team 1	Agg.	Team 2	1st leg	2nd leg
Sarajevo	4–2	Čelik Zenica	4–2	0–0
Lukavac	2–4	Željezničar	2–1	0–3

== Final ==
31 May 1997

Sarajevo	2–0	Željezničar
Repuh 30'; Ferhatović 88'	Report

Stadion Koševo, Sarajevo
Attendance: 25,000
Referee: Mirsad Ibrišimbegović (Travnik)

== See also ==
- 1996–97 First League of Bosnia and Herzegovina
