= FK Turbina Jablanica =

Association football club in Bosnia and Herzegovina

- Full name: Fudbalski Klub Turbina Jablanica
- Founded: 1947
- Ground: Jablanica City Stadium
- Capacity: 2,000
- League: Second League of FBiH - South
- 2024–25: Second League of FBiH - South, 12th

Fudbalski klub Turbina Jablanica (Serbo-Croatian Cyrillic: Фудбалски клуб Турбина Јабланица; lit. 'Football Club Turbina Jablanica') is a professional association football club based in the town of Jablanica, Bosnia and Herzegovina.

Turbina currently competes in the Second League of the Federation of Bosnia and Herzegovina (South), the third tier of Bosnian football. The club plays its home matches at the Jablanica City stadium, which has a capacity of 2,000 seats.

Turbina has produced a number of famous players in its history, most notably Vahid Halilhodžić and Hasan Salihamidžić.

== Honours ==
=== Domestic ===
==== League ====
- Second League of the Federation of Bosnia and Herzegovina:
  - Winners (1): 2013–14 (south)
