= OFK Gradina =

Gradina
- Full name: Omladinski Fudbalski Klub Gradina Srebrenik
- Founded: 1953
- Ground: Gradski Stadion, Srebrenik
- Capacity: 5,000
- Manager: Vacant
- League: Second League of FBiH (North)
- 2024–25: First League of FBiH, 11th of 15 (relegated)
Home colours	Away colours

Omladinski Fudbalski Klub Gradina Srebrenik is a professional association football club from the city of Srebrenik that is situated in the northeastern part of Bosnia and Herzegovina.

The club currently plays in the Second League of the Federation of Bosnia and Herzegovina.

== History ==
OFK Gradina was founded in 1953 in a karaoke bar within the city of Srebrenik. The logo of the club has the traditional Lilium Bosniacum placed in the central part of the logo.

After the collapse of Yugoslavia, Gradina played in the first six seasons of the top level First League of Bosnia and Herzegovina. From 2000 however, they have yoyo-ed between the second and third tiers of the Bosnian football pyramid with only one more season in the Premier League in the 2012–13 season. Currently, Gradina is active in the second tier-First League of the Federation of Bosnia and Herzegovina and plays its home matches on the Gradski Stadion (City Stadium) in Srebrenik, which has a capacity of 5,000 seats.

== Honours ==
=== Domestic ===
==== League ====
- First League of the Federation of Bosnia and Herzegovina:
  - Winners (1): 2011–12
- Second League of the Federation of Bosnia and Herzegovina:
  - Winners (3): 2004–05 (north), 2009–10 (north), 2020–21 (north)

== Club seasons ==
Season	League									Cup	Europe
Season	Division	P	W	D	L	F	A	Pts	Pos	Cup	Europe
1994–95	First League; Tuzla Group	5	3	1	1	16	8	10	2nd		
1995–96	First League	30	9	6	15	35	54	33	12th		
1996–97	First League	30	11	8	11	40	44	41	11th		
1997–98	First League	30	13	5	12	41	42	44	6th	QF	
1998–99	First League	30	7	12	11	24	32	33	12th		
1999–2000	First League	30	7	3	20	18	67	24	15th ↓	QF	
Current format of Premier League of Bosnia and Herzegovina
2000–01	First League of FBiH	32	7	4	21	24	73	25	17th ↓		
2003–04	Second League of FBiH – North	30	15	4	11	59	41	49	3rd		
2004–05	Second League of FBiH								1st ↑		
2005–06	First League of FBiH	30	14	4	12	56	39	46	7th		
2006–07	First League of FBiH	30	13	4	13	37	33	43	7th		
2007–08	First League of FBiH	30	8	5	17	26	49	29	14th ↓		
2008–09	Second League of FBiH										
2009–10	Second League of FBiH								1st ↑		
2010–11	First League of FBiH	30	13	5	12	44	39	44	9th		
2011–12	First League of FBiH	30	19	4	7	59	30	61	1st ↑		
2012–13	Premier League	30	1	6	23	17	57	9	16th ↓	1/16	
2013–14	First League of FBiH	30	12	5	13	29	30	41	9th		
2014–15	First League of FBiH	30	9	6	15	29	39	33	14th ↓	1/16	
2015–16	Second League of FBiH – North										
2016–17	Second League of FBiH – North	28	12	5	11	42	39	41	6th		
2017–18	Second League of FBiH – North	30	16	6	8	43	29	54	2nd		
2018–19	Second League of FBiH – North	30	16	5	9	51	34	53	2nd		
2019–20	Second League of FBiH – North	15	11	2	2	51	18	35	2nd		
2020–21	Second League of FBiH – North	30	24	4	2	101	24	76	1st ↑		
2021–22	First League of FBiH	30	14	3	13	49	47	45	6th	1/16	
2022–23	First League of FBiH	30	14	5	11	40	39	47	6th	1/16	
2023–24	First League of FBiH	30	9	7	14	25	43	34	13th		
2024–25	First League of FBiH	28	10	7	11	35	36	37	11th ↓		

== Managerial history ==
- (Bosnia and Herzegovina) Samir Adanalić (1 July 2010 – 27 August 2012)
- (Bosnia and Herzegovina) Denis Sadiković (29 August 2012 – 19 September 2012)
- (Bosnia and Herzegovina) Boris Gavran (20 September 2012 – 24 September 2012)
- (Bosnia and Herzegovina) Nedžad Bajrović (24 September 2012 – 10 October 2012)
- (Bosnia and Herzegovina) Fuad Grbešić (11 October 2012 – 12 January 2013)
- (Bosnia and Herzegovina) Nedžad Bajrović (13 January 2013 – 13 May 2013)
- (Bosnia and Herzegovina) Vinko Divković (14 May 2013 – 30 June 2013)
- (Bosnia and Herzegovina) Fuad Grbešić (2 July 2013 – 5 July 2014)
- (Bosnia and Herzegovina) Nedžad Bajrović (8 July 2014 – 10 November 2014)
- (Bosnia and Herzegovina) Smajil Karić (26 March 2015 – 30 June 2015)
- (Bosnia and Herzegovina) Samir Adanalić (1 July 2015 – 31 December 2016)
- (Bosnia and Herzegovina) Fuad Grbešić (15 July 2017 – 28 March 2018)
- (Bosnia and Herzegovina) Samir Adanalić (29 March 2018 – 27 February 2019)
- (Bosnia and Herzegovina) Suad Jašarević (27 February 2019 – 25 June 2020)
- (Bosnia and Herzegovina) Samir Adanalić (25 June 2020 – 21 June 2023)
- (Bosnia and Herzegovina) Jasmin Moranjkić (29 June 2023 – 30 December 2023)
- (Bosnia and Herzegovina) Muamer Salibašić (27 January 2024 – 27 June 2024)
- (Bosnia and Herzegovina) Jasmin Moranjkić (17 July 2024 – 19 May 2025)
