= Emir Granov =

Bosnian-Herzegovinian footballer

Personal information
- Full name: Emir Granov
- Date of birth: 17 February 1976 (age 50)
- Place of birth: Sarajevo, SFR Yugoslavia
- Height: 1.83 m (6 ft 0 in)
- Position: Striker

Senior career*
Years	Team	Apps	(Gls)
1997–1998	FK Sarajevo		
1998–1999	Farense	15	(1)
1999–2000	FK Sarajevo		
2000–2001	Újpest FC	6	(1)
2001	Rayo Vallecano	1	(0)

International career
	Bosnia U-21		(2)
1999-2001	Bosnia and Herzegovina	6	(0)
- * Club domestic league appearances and goals

Emir Granov (born 17 February 1976 in Sarajevo) is a retired Bosnian-Herzegovinian footballer.

== International career ==
He made his debut for Bosnia and Herzegovina in an August 1999 friendly match away against Liechtenstein and has earned a total of 6 caps, scoring no goals. His final international was a June 2001 friendly against Uzbekistan.
