= NK Čelik Zenica =

Association football club in Bosnia and Herzegovina

Čelik Zenica
- Full name: Nogometni klub Čelik Zenica
- Nicknames: Crno-crveni (The Black-Reds); Starac (The Old Man)
- Founded: 16 June 1945; 81 years ago
- Ground: Bilino Polje Stadium, Zenica
- Capacity: 13,694
- Chairman: Denis Mušović
- Manager: Bojan Regoje
- League: Premier League BH
- 2025–26: First League of FBiH, 1st of 14 (promoted)
- Website: www.nkcelik.ba
Home colours	Away colours

Nogometni klub Čelik Zenica (English: Football Club Čelik Zenica) is a professional football club based in Zenica, Bosnia and Herzegovina. The name Čelik means Steel in Bosnian, and it symbolizes the strength and power of the club in an industrial city well known for steel production. Throughout its history, the club has been known for the excellent support of its fans at its Bilino Polje Stadium, which hosts the Bosnia and Herzegovina national team.

NK Čelik is one of the most prominent and successful football teams in Bosnia and Herzegovina, being one of only two Bosnian clubs to win the national championship three consecutive seasons (1994 to 1997). The club also won consecutive national cups in 1995 and 1996. During the time of the former Yugoslavia, Čelik had played 17 seasons in the Yugoslav First League. Čelik won the Mitropa Cup two times and was once a joint winner of the UEFA Intertoto Cup.

In addition, Čelik is the only fan-owned football club in Bosnia and Herzegovina where club members democratically elect its leadership. Today, the club is active in the Premier League of Bosnia and Herzegovina.

== History ==
The club was founded on 16 June 1945 by a group of World War II veterans. The name of the club had been proposed by one of the founders, Zdenko Mazanek, to symbolize the strength of the club and its link to the workers of the city's metallurgical industry.

Čelik was relegated from the Bosnian Premier League for the first time ever in the 2019–20 season. Subsequently, to stabilise the club due to financial difficulties, its General Assembly voted to continue competing in the fourth tier-League of Zenica-Doboj Canton on 13 July 2020. In 2023, Čelik got promoted to the First League of FBiH, the second level of football in Bosnia and Herzegovina. The club then managed to earn promotion back to the Premier League in the 2025–26 season.

== Club culture ==
Over the years, the club developed a strong identification with its hometown, Zenica, becoming one of its symbols. The club has produced many important international players, including Elvir Bolić, Mirsad Hibić and Mladen Krstajić.

== Grounds ==
Čelik plays their home games at the Bilino Polje stadium which is also the biggest stadium in the city. Over the years the club had changed four different stadiums settling at their current ground in 1972.

Bilino Polje Stadium

During the first few years of the club's existence, following World War II, Čelik's stadium was located roughly on the place of the current Bilino Polje stadium, close to the Bosna river. The ground was covered in clay, as was the practice of lower-level football grounds at the time. The stadium itself had one wooden stand, which was built over time, and the club often played in front of full capacity.

However, due to the increased popularity of the club and the need for a better surface, during the early 1950s, the club moved to the nearby Stadion Blatuša, which was located in the Blatuša neighborhood of Zenica. It was there that Čelik started its first run of successes when they had reached promotion to the Yugoslav First League in 1966 and won the Mitropa Cup in 1971 (the final was played on neutral ground in Gorizia, Italy).

Shortly after the first Mitropa Cup victory, plans were made for a new, modern stadium, built in place of Čelik's first stadium. The construction took 8 months to complete, and it was officially opened on 4 October 1972 for the second leg of the 1972 Mitropa Cup final when Fiorentina would unsuccessfully contest the 1971 title holder Čelik, 1–0. The attendance record of 35,000 still stands today due to the introduction of seats in the stadium over the years. The stadium went through a number of renovations and reconstructions, the most recent being in 2012.

From July to August 2012, the stadium went through another renovation where the pitch was changed with under-soil heating installed. During the renovation, Čelik played two Bosnian Premier League matches as well as one Bosnian Cup match on the Stadion Kamberovića Polje, winning all of them. In the second part of the same season, the club played one more game there, which ended in a draw.

The youth squads of Čelik usually play their games at the smaller stadium Kamberovića Polje.

== Supporters ==
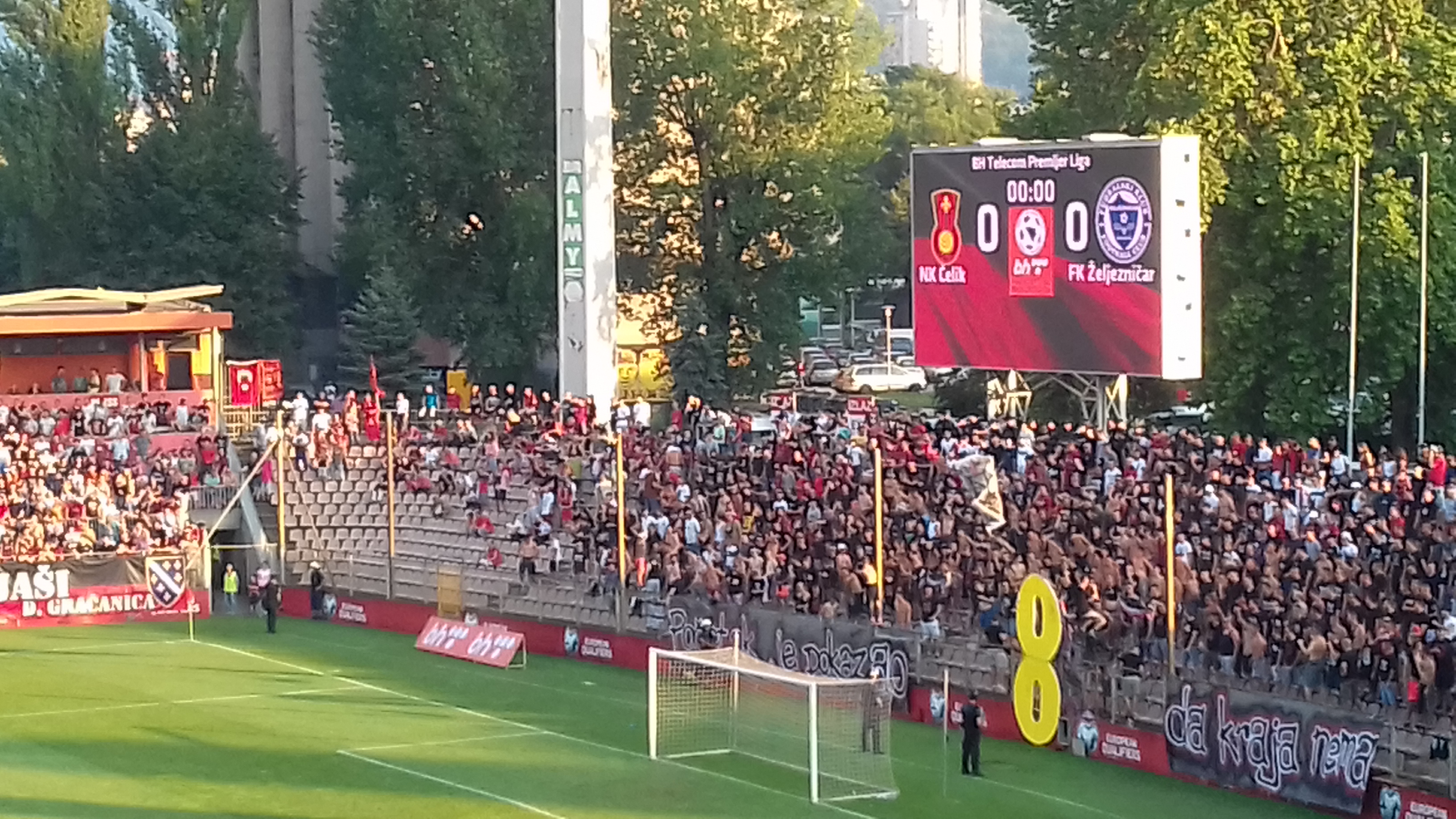
Čelik's main supporter group, Robijaši, in a game against Željezničar on 10 August 2019.

The ultras supporter group of Čelik, established in 1988 in Zenica, is called Robijaši (The Convicts in English) because Zenica is famous for its prison. Widely known for their fanatic support, they have been fighting to preserve the club and support it through difficult financial times.

== Honours ==
=== Domestic ===
==== League ====
- First League of Bosnia and Herzegovina:
  - Winners (3): 1994–95, 1995–96, 1996–97
- First League of the Federation of Bosnia and Herzegovina:
  - Winners (1): 2025–26
- Second League of the Federation of Bosnia and Herzegovina:
  - Winners (1): 2022–23 (center)
- Yugoslav Second League:
  - Winners (4): 1965–66 (west), 1978–79 (west), 1982–83 (west), 1984–85 (west)

==== Cups ====
- Bosnia and Herzegovina Cup:
  - Winners (2): 1994–95, 1995–96
  - Runners-up (2): 2010–11, 2013–14

=== European ===
- Intertoto Cup:
  - Winners (1): 1975 (group 10)
- Mitropa Cup:
  - Winners (2): 1970–71, 1971–72
  - Runners-up (2): 1972–73, 1979–80

== Recent seasons ==
Season	League									Cup	Europe
Season	Division	P	W	D	L	F	A	Pts	Pos	Cup	Europe
1994–95	First League; Zenica Group	3	3	0	0	13	3	9	1st	Winners	
1994–95	First League; Final Play-off	3	3	0	0	7	3	9	1st	Winners	
1995–96	First League	30	21	5	4	65	23	68	1st	Winners	
1996–97	First League	30	17	7	6	57	23	58	1st	SF	
1997–98	First League; Bosniaks First League	30	16	8	6	48	30	53	2nd	R16	
1997–98	First League; Play-off	2	0	0	2	2	7	0	6th	R16	
1998–99	First League	30	13	3	14	47	47	42	9th	QF	
1999–2000	First League	30	13	8	9	45	36	55	9th	R16	
Current format of Premier League of Bosnia and Herzegovina
2000–01	Premier League	42	21	10	11	75	40	73	4th	QF	
2001–02	Premier League	30	12	7	11	39	30	43	6th	SF	UEFA Intertoto Cup – R2
2002–03	Premier League	38	16	10	12	61	33	58	5th	R1	
2003–04	Premier League	30	9	10	11	42	43	37	12th	R2	
2004–05	Premier League	30	13	2	15	29	37	41	13th	R2	
2005–06	Premier League	30	10	5	15	33	45	35	14th	R1	
2006–07	Premier League	30	12	3	15	29	35	39	14th	SF	
2007–08	Premier League	30	16	4	10	38	32	52	3rd	R2	
2008–09	Premier League	30	12	5	13	29	32	41	10th	R1	UEFA Intertoto Cup – R1
2009–10	Premier League	30	10	5	10	33	36	50	13th	R2	
2010–11	Premier League	30	11	7	12	30	30	40	10th	Runners-up	
2011–12	Premier League	30	8	10	12	31	39	34	9th	QF	
2012–13	Premier League	30	14	9	7	44	30	51	4th	QF	
2013–14	Premier League	30	10	13	7	35	32	43	7th	Runners-up	
2014–15	Premier League	30	10	11	9	34	35	66	7th	R2	
2015–16	Premier League	30	12	10	8	35	28	46	6th	R2	
2016–17	Premier League	32	8	11	13	28	39	35	10th	R1	
2017–18	Premier League	32	8	4	20	30	61	28	11th	R2	
2018–19	Premier League	33	11	10	12	30	49	43	7th	R1	
2019–20 (Note: 2019–20 Premier League of Bosnia and Herzegovina suspended in March 2020 due to the COVID-19 pandemic in Bosnia and Herzegovina; season curtailed and final standings (including Sarajevo as champions) declared by a points-per-game ratio on 1 June 2020.)	Premier League	22	5	5	12	17	33	17	11th ↓	R1	
2020–21	League of Zenica-Doboj Canton (Note: Čelik were initially relegated to the Prva Liga FBiH, but were then excluded from the league on 13 July 2020.)	18	16	2	0	65	5	50	1st ↑		
2021–22	Second League of FBiH - Center	30	21	6	3	79	21	66	3rd		
2022–23	Second League of FBiH - Center	30	26	3	1	92	12	81	1st ↑	R2	
2023–24	First League of FBiH	30	12	10	8	40	31	46	4th	R1	
2024–25	First League of FBiH	28	13	6	9	40	29	45	3rd	R2	
2025–26	First League of FBiH	26	17	8	1	52	19	59	1st ↑	R2	

== European record ==
Competition	P	W	D	L	GF	GA	GD
UEFA Intertoto Cup	6	4	0	2	11	9	+2
Total	6	4	0	2	11	9	+2

P = Matches played; W = Matches won; D = Matches drawn; L = Matches lost; GF = Goals for; GA = Goals against; GD = Goals difference. Defunct competitions indicated in italics.

=== List of matches ===
Season	Competition	Round	Opponent	Home	Away	Agg.
2001	UEFA Intertoto Cup	1R	(Turkey) Denizlispor	1–0	5–3	6–3
2001	UEFA Intertoto Cup	2R	(Belgium) Gent	1–0	0–2	1–2
2008	UEFA Intertoto Cup	1R	(Montenegro) Grbalj	3–2	1–2	4–4 (a)

== Players ==
=== Current squad ===
As of 30 July 2026

Note: Flags indicate national team as defined under FIFA eligibility rules; some limited exceptions apply. Players may hold more than one non-FIFA nationality.

No.	Pos.	Nation	Player
1	GK	BIH	Arman Šutković
2	DF	BIH	Amer Hodžić
4	DF	BIH	Kenan Horić (captain)
5	MF	BIH	Harun Vardo
6	DF	BIH	Amer Mašetić
7	FW	BIH	Dževad Sijamija
8	MF	ESP	Andrés Mohedano
9	FW	SRB	Dejan Vidić
11	FW	ALG	Samy Faraj
13	GK	SRB	Vladimir Savić
14	MF	BIH	Aldin Hrvanović
15	FW	BIH	Marin Popović
17	DF	BIH	Albin Omić

No.	Pos.	Nation	Player
18	MF	MNE	Oliver Šarkić
19	DF	BIH	Nedim Smajlović
20	MF	CRO	Bruno Jenjić
21	DF	BIH	Eldar Sivac
22	DF	BIH	Eman Babić
23	GK	BIH	Adi Durmo
24	DF	BIH	Halid Šabanović
26	FW	LBR	Emmanuel Sieh
27	DF	SRB	Nemanja Tomašević
28	MF	GHA	Joseph Amoah
29	FW	BIH	Vedad Spahić
88	MF	BIH	Faruk Gogić
99	FW	BIH	Anes Mašić

=== Out on loan ===
Note: Flags indicate national team as defined under FIFA eligibility rules; some limited exceptions apply. Players may hold more than one non-FIFA nationality.

No.	Pos.	Nation	Player
—	FW	BIH	Amir Krehmić (at Vitez until 30 June 2027)

== Notable managers ==
Dates	Name	Honours
1970–1971	(Socialist Federal Republic of Yugoslavia) Dušan Varagić	1970–71 Mitropa Cup
1971–1972	(Socialist Federal Republic of Yugoslavia) Midhat Mujkić	1971–72 Mitropa Cup
1974–1975	(Socialist Federal Republic of Yugoslavia) Marcel Žigante	1975 Intertoto Cup (Joint Winner)
1992–1996	(Bosnia and Herzegovina) Nermin Hadžiahmetović	1994–95 Bosnian Championship; 1994–95 Bosnian Cup; 1995–96 Bosnian Championship; 1995–96 Bosnian Cup
1996–1997	(Bosnia and Herzegovina) Kemal Hafizović	1996–97 Bosnian Championship
