= FK Radnički Lukavac =

Bosnian association football club

FK Radnički
- Full name: Fudbalski Klub Radnički
- Founded: 1921
- Ground: Stadion Jošik
- Capacity: 3,000
- Manager: Mirza Mahovkić
- League: Second League of FBiH (North)
- 2024–25: First League of FBiH, 15th of 15 (relegated)
Home colours	Away colours

Fudbalski klub Radnički Lukavac is a professional association football club from the city of Lukavac that is situated in Bosnia and Herzegovina.

Radnički currently competes in the Second League of the Federation of Bosnia and Herzegovina and plays its home matches at the Jošik Stadium, which has a capacity of 3,000 seats.

== History ==
The full name of the club is Fudbalski klub Radnički Lukavac and it was founded in 1921.

Radnički's so far biggest success came in the mid to late 1990s. In the 1995–96 First League of Bosnia and Herzegovina season, the club finished as runners-up, having only 4 points less than 1st placed and crowned champions Čelik Zenica. The club's second biggest so far success came in the 1996–97 Bosnia and Herzegovina Football Cup season. In that cup season, Radnički made it all the way to the semi-final, eliminating Vrbanjuša on the way in the quarter-final and getting eliminated by Željezničar in the semi-final.

In the 1999–2000 season, the club got relegated from the First League of Bosnia and Herzegovina and from then, until 2017, have played in the First League of the Federation of Bosnia and Herzegovina.

Currently, Radnički competes in the Second League of the Federation of Bosnia and Herzegovina (Group North), after getting relegated from the First League of FBiH in the 2016–17 season.

== Supporters ==
FK Radnički Lukavac's supporters are called the Sioux and were founded in 1989. Their stand is on the south side of the Jošik Stadium.

== Rivalries ==
Radnički Lukavac's main rival is Sloboda Tuzla. That rivalry can also be seen between the supporter groups of the two teams.

Radnički fans are called SIOUX and FK Sloboda fans are called FUKARE. When the match is played, the Sioux are on the south side and Fukare are on the north side. The match between these two teams is the most watched wherever they play in, Lukavac or Tuzla.

This game is also a match of high risk because of hooligan conflicts in the early history, but in recent years there are no incidents between the two supporter groups.

== Honours ==
=== Domestic ===
==== League ====
- First League of Bosnia and Herzegovina:
  - Runners-up (1): 1995–96
- First League of the Federation of Bosnia and Herzegovina:
  - Runners-up (1): 2012–13
- Second League of the Federation of Bosnia and Herzegovina:
  - Winners (2): 2011–12 (north), 2021–22 (north)

==== Cups ====
- Bosnia and Herzegovina Cup:
  - Semi-finalists (1): 1996–97
