= First League of Bosnia and Herzegovina =

Top tier association football league, Bosnia and Herzegovina

- Founded: 1994
- First season: 1994–95
- Folded: 2000
- Country: Bosnia and Herzegovina
- Confederation: UEFA
- Number of clubs: 16
- Level on pyramid: 2
- Relegation to: • Second League of Bosnia and Herzegovina • Second League of Herzeg-Bosnia
- Domestic cup: Bosnian Cup
- International cup(s): • Champions League (2000) • UEFA Cup (1998, 2000) • Intertoto Cup (1999–2000)
- Last champions: NK Brotnjo (1) (last champion) (1999–2000 (last season))
- Most championships: Čelik (3)
- Website: http://www.nfsbih.ba

The First League of Bosnia and Herzegovina (Bosnian: Prva liga Bosne i Hercegovine / Прва лига Босне и Херцеговине) operated by the Football Association of Bosnia and Herzegovina (abbreviation: N/FSBiH) was the top tier football league in Republic of Bosnia and Herzegovina, and after signage of Dayton Peace Agreement of Bosnia and Herzegovina, until creation of Premier League of Bosnia and Herzegovina in 2000 (formal unification of the country's football organizations as N/FSBiH happened in 1997). League changed format and name several times since its inception and the first 1994–95 season.

N/FSBiH and its competition has been recognized by UEFA and FIFA since July 1996 (UEFA admitted N/FSBiH to a full membership in 1998), as of season 1996–97, and was represented by adequate number of clubs in European competition at the time. The league numbered 16 clubs, and at first included clubs from a territory under the control of then Republic of Bosnia and Herzegovina institutions and auspices of N/FSBiH only, at the time consequently with Bosniak majority. Since 1996, end of the war and adoption of Dayton Agreement, FIFA and UEFA urged and endorsed unification of all three preexisting football organizations, namely Bosnian Croat football organization, Bosnian Serb football organization and N/FSBiH, under one association as unified N/FSBiH. At first clubs from Federation of Bosnia and Herzegovina entity First League of Herzeg-Bosnia and First League of Bosnia and Herzegovina played in playoff for champion at the end of the season, while football organization from Republika Srpska entity refused to participate for the time being, indeed until two years after creation of Premier League of Bosnia and Herzegovina and 2002–03 season. At the end of the season last two teams were relegated, and winners of Second League of Bosnia and Herzegovina were promoted to First League.

== History ==
=== War period 1992–1996 ===
After a breakup of Yugoslavia Bosnia and Herzegovina proclaimed independence in late winter 1992, and already in April same year N/FSBiH applied for membership with FIFA and UEFA. Meanwhile, due to the outbreak of Bosnian War in April 1992 no games were played in the 1992–93 season. In late 1993 some parts of the country re-launched football competitions with reduced scope. But just as the country was divided along ethnic lines, so was football.

In 1993 Bosnian Croats launched the First League of Herzeg-Bosnia in which only Croatian clubs competed on parochial scale within the limits of West Herzegovina and few other enclaves. In the same year Bosnian Serbs also organized their own First League of the Republika Srpska, on a territory held by Republika Srpska regime at the time. Only football on a territory under the control of then Republic of Bosnia and Herzegovina institutions and auspices of N/FSBiH, at the time consequently with Bosniak majority, apart from a brief competition for the season 1994–95 (won by Čelik Zenica), came to a standstill. Competition under auspices of N/FSBiH did not resume until 1995–96 season when the First League of Bosnia and Herzegovina was launched.

=== Post-war period 1996–2000 ===
These three separate football leagues were operating in Bosnia and Herzegovina until 1998, and 2000. Since FIFA and UEFA showed support only for the association operating under patronage of the official and internationally recognized state institutions, during the war and prior to Dayton Peace Agreement as well as after its signedge, they endorsed unification of all three organizations as N/FSBiH. This also came as a consequence of FIFA decision to recognize N/FSBiH already in July 1996, while in the same year UEFA admitted N/FSBiH as an adjacent member until 1998 when they recognized its full membership. This meant that only N/FSBiH clubs and its national team could compete at the international and official level.

Final unification has been preceded by several stages. At first was created a playoff where clubs were playing for the champion under N/FSBiH auspices. Idea was that playoff under unified N/FSBiH auspices should bring together clubs competing under three separate organizations for the first time but was rejected by Serb association, leaving clubs from Croat football association and N/FSBiH participating playoff for the seasons 1997–98 and 1999–00, while 1998–99 playoff was canceled due to Croat's association hesitation on the decision on which stadiums games should be played. Next season playoff was resumed for the last time prior to full and final agreement on unified N/FSBiH and its competition, Premier League BiH (Premijer Liga), in the fall 2000.

In a way, since 1997 season until creation of Premier League for the season 2000-2001, First League of Bosnia and Herzegovina became a two divisions league, with Bosnian Croats' football organization First League of Herceg-Bosnia and N/FSBiH's First League of Bosnia and Herzegovina acting as separate divisions until end of the season, after which champion was decided through playoff between four clubs - two first placed form both leagues.

== Bosnia and Herzegovina Champions ==
In 1993 Bosnian Croats launched the First League of Herzeg-Bosnia, while Bosnian Serbs also organized their own First League of the Republika Srpska in the same year. Competition under auspices of N/FSBiH, apart from a brief competition for the season 1994–95, did not resume until 1995–96 season when the First League of Bosnia and Herzegovina was launched. Since 1996 it was decide that from 1997–98 season champion of Bosnia and Herzegovina will be decided through playoff. At the end of seasons 1997–98 and 1999–2000, while 1998–99 season playoff had been canceled, champion was decided through playoff. Playoff was played between two first placed clubs from both leagues, First League of Bosnia and Herzegovina and First League of Herzeg-Bosnia, while football organization of Republika Srpska entity refused to allow its First League of Republika Srpska clubs to participate until 2002.

=== Champions under N/FSBiH auspices ===
Champions of First League of Bosnia and Herzegovina between 1994 and 2000 under N/FSBiH auspices:

- 1994–95 - Čelik - "Champion of BiH"
- 1995–96 - Čelik - "Champion of BiH"
- 1996–97 - Čelik - "Champion of BiH"
- 1997–98 - Bosna Visoko - "Champion of First League of Bosnia and Herzegovina" (first round)
- 1997–98 - Željezničar - "Champion of First League of Bosnia and Herzegovina" (Play-Offs) - Official champions
- 1998–99 - Sarajevo - "Champion of BiH"
- 1999–2000 - Jedinstvo Bihać - "Champion of First League of Bosnia and Herzegovina" (first round)
- 1999–2000 - Brotnjo - "Champion of First League of Bosnia and Herzegovina" (Play-Offs) - Official champions

=== Champions under auspices of HB football organization ===
Champions of First League of Herzeg-Bosnia under auspices of Bosnian Croats' football organization:

- 1993–94 - Široki Brijeg – Mario Prskalo (10 goals, Široki Brijeg)
- 1994–95 - Široki Brijeg – Anđelko Marušić (15, Široki Brijeg)
- 1995–96 - Široki Brijeg – Mario Marušić (15, Grude), Dejan Džepina (15, Novi Travnik)
- 1996–97 - Široki Brijeg – Anđelko Marušić (21, Široki Brijeg)
- 1997–98 - Široki Brijeg – Stanko Bubalo (31, Široki Brijeg)
- 1998–99 - Posušje – Slađan Filipović (19, Široki Brijeg)
- 1999–00 - Posušje – Robert Ristovski (18, Kiseljak)

=== Champions under auspices of RS football organization ===
Champions of First League of the Republika Srpska under auspices of Bosnian Serbs' football organization:

Season	Champion	Runners Up	Top Goalscorer	Club	Goals
1995–96	Boksit Milići	Rudar Prijedor	(Bosnia and Herzegovina) Siniša Đurić (Bosnia and Herzegovina) Zoran Majstorović	Kozara Gradiška; Boksit Milići	16 Goals; 16 Goals
1996–97	Rudar Ugljevik	Sloga Trn	(Bosnia and Herzegovina) Mladen Zgonjanin; Marić	Sloga Trn; Glasinac Sokolac	14 Goals; 14 Goals
1997–98	Rudar Ugljevik	Borac Banja Luka	Nikola Bala	Rudar Ugljevik	31 Goals
1998–99	Radnik Bijeljina	Rudar Ugljevik	(Bosnia and Herzegovina) Mladen Zgonjanin	Sloga Trn	23 Goals
1999–00	Boksit Milići	Rudar Ugljevik	Nedo Zdjelar	Sloboda Novi Grad	29 Goals
2000–01	Borac Banja Luka	Sloboda Novi Grad	(Bosnia and Herzegovina) Milanko Đerić	Boksit Milići	26 Goals
2001–02	Leotar Trebinje	Kozara Gradiška	(Serbia) Pavle Delibašić; Siniša Jovanović	Leotar Trebinje; Glasinac Sokolac	21 Goals; 21 Goals

=== Playoff for Champion of Bosnia and Herzegovina ===
At the end of seasons 1997–98 and 1999–2000 (1998–99 season playoff had been canceled) champion was decided through playoff between four clubs - two first placed teams from each league, First League of Bosnia and Herzegovina and First League of Herzeg-Bosnia respectively:

Season	Winner of play-off	Runners-up of play-off	Winning manager	Top scorer(s) of play-off	
Season	Winner of play-off	Runners-up of play-off	Winning manager	Player(s) (Club)	Goals
1997–98^{1}	Željezničar	Sarajevo	(Bosnia and Herzegovina) Enver Hadžiabdić (1)	(Croatia) Stanko Bubalo (Široki Brijeg) (Bosnia and Herzegovina) Hadis Zubanović (Željezničar)	3
1998–99^{2}	Three regional winners (Sarajevo, Posušje and Radnik)				
1999–00^{3}	Brotnjo	Budućnost	(Bosnia and Herzegovina) Ivo Ištuk (1)	(Bosnia and Herzegovina) Zikret Kuljaninović (Budućnost) (Bosnia and Herzegovina) Alen Škoro (Sarajevo) (Bosnia and Herzegovina) Halim Stupac (Jedinstvo)	5

^{1} A play-off between the best placed teams of First League of Bosnia and Herzegovina and First League of Herzeg-Bosnia was played without clubs from First League of Republika Srpska. The best two clubs got the right to play in 1998–99 UEFA Cup.
^{2} Play-off was scheduled but was later canceled because of stadium issues. Three different leagues played, no play-off contested, therefore no club got the right to play in European competition.
^{3} A play-off between the best placed teams of First League of Bosnia and Herzegovina and First League of Herzeg-Bosnia was played without clubs from First League of Republika Srpska. Three clubs got the right to play in European competition.

== See also ==
- Premier League of Bosnia and Herzegovina
- First League of the Federation of Bosnia and Herzegovina
- First League of Herzeg-Bosnia
- First League of the Republika Srpska
- Bosnia and Herzegovina Football Cup
- Bosnia and Herzegovina football league system
