= NK Đerzelez =

Bosnian football club

Đerzelez Sarajevo
- Full name: Nogometni klub Đerzelez Sarajevo
- Founded: 1932; 1992 (reformed)
- Dissolved: 6 June 1945; 2001
- Ground: Stadion Kovačići
Home colours

NK Đerzelez was a Bosnian football club from Sarajevo during the Kingdom of Yugoslavia and in more recent times, Zenica.

== History ==
The football club was formed in Sarajevo in 1932 as ŠK Đerzelez.

The club reformed in the nineties after the independence of Bosnia and Herzegovina.

Đerzelez managed to finish 6th during 1999–2000 First League of Bosnia and Herzegovina which enabled the club to play against Zrinjski in order to qualify for 2000 UEFA Intertoto Cup competition, but failed to advance. In 1999 they merged with NK Zenica to form NK Đerzelez Zenica. The club competed in First League of the Federation of Bosnia and Herzegovina and in 2000–01 season of Premier League of Bosnia and Herzegovina finishing dead last with 40 defeats from 42 games played.

The club dissolved in 2001 and is inactive from professional football.
