= 2022–23 Premier League of Bosnia and Herzegovina =

Premijer liga
- Season: 2022–23
- Dates: 15 July 2022 – 28 May 2023
- Champions: Zrinjski; 8th Premier League title 8th Bosnian title
- Relegated: Leotar; Sloboda
- Champions League: Zrinjski
- Europa Conference League: Borac; Željezničar; Sarajevo
- Matches: 198
- Goals: 489 (2.47 per match)
- Top goalscorer: Nemanja Bilbija (24 goals)
- Biggest home win: Zrinjski 5–0 Posušje (5 March 2023)
- Biggest away win: Velež 3–5 Sarajevo (21 May 2023)
- Highest scoring: Velež 3–5 Sarajevo (21 May 2023)
- Longest winning run: Zrinjski (11 matches)
- Longest unbeaten run: Zrinjski (20 matches)
- Longest winless run: Tuzla City (13 matches)
- Longest losing run: Tuzla City (5 matches)
- Highest attendance: 13,000; Sarajevo 2–2 Željezničar (12 May 2023)
- Lowest attendance: 100; Igman 0–0 Posušje (6 November 2022)
- Total attendance: 448,298
- Average attendance: 2,264

The 2022–23 Premier League of Bosnia and Herzegovina (known as m:tel Premier League for sponsorship reasons) was the 23rd season of the Premier League of Bosnia and Herzegovina, the highest football league of Bosnia and Herzegovina. The season began on 15 July 2022 and ended on 28 May 2023, with a winter break between late November 2022 and late February 2023, due to the 2022 FIFA World Cup which was held between 20 November and 18 December 2022.

Zrinjski Mostar successfully defended their title, securing an eighth Premier League title with four matches to spare.

== Teams ==
A total of 12 teams contested in the league, including 10 sides from the 2021–22 season and two promoted from each of the second-level leagues, Igman Konjic and Sloga Doboj, replacing relegated sides Radnik Bijeljina and Rudar Prijedor.

=== Stadiums and locations ===
Locations of the 2022–23 Premier League of BiH clubs

Note: Table lists in alphabetical order.

Team	Location	Stadium	Capacity
Borac	Banja Luka	Banja Luka City Stadium	10,030
Igman	Konjic	Konjic City Stadium	5,000
Leotar	Trebinje	Police Stadium	8,550
Posušje	Posušje	Mokri Dolac	5,040
Sarajevo	Sarajevo (Koševo)	Asim Ferhatović Hase	30,121
Sloboda	Tuzla	Tušanj	7,200
Sloga	Doboj	Luke Stadium	3,000
Široki Brijeg	Široki Brijeg	Pecara	5,147
Tuzla City	Tuzla	Tušanj	7,200
Velež	Mostar (Vrapčići)	Stadion Rođeni	7,000
Zrinjski	Mostar	Stadion pod Bijelim Brijegom	9,000
Željezničar	Sarajevo (Grbavica)	Grbavica	13,146

=== Personnel and kits ===
Note: Flags indicate national team as has been defined under FIFA eligibility rules. Players and Managers may hold more than one non-FIFA nationality.

Team	Head coach	Captain	Kit manufacturer	Shirt sponsor
Borac	(Bosnia and Herzegovina) Vinko Marinović	(Bosnia and Herzegovina) Aleksandar Subić	Kelme	Mtel
Igman	(Bosnia and Herzegovina) Husref Musemić	(Bosnia and Herzegovina) Anel Hebibović	No1	Igman
Leotar	(Bosnia and Herzegovina) Marko Maksimović	(Bosnia and Herzegovina) Đoko Milović	Kelme	WWin
Posušje	(Croatia) Branko Karačić	(Bosnia and Herzegovina) Davor Landeka	Jako	Formula
Sarajevo	(Bosnia and Herzegovina) Mirza Varešanović	(Bosnia and Herzegovina) Besim Šerbečić	Erreà	Turkish Airlines
Sloboda	(Croatia) Danijel Pranjić	(Bosnia and Herzegovina) Emir Jusić	Legea	WWin
Sloga	(Bosnia and Herzegovina) Vlado Jagodić	(Serbia) Milan Milanović	GB3	Meridian
Široki Brijeg	(Bosnia and Herzegovina) Ivica Barbarić	(Bosnia and Herzegovina) Marijan Ćavar	Kelme	WWin
Tuzla City	(Bosnia and Herzegovina) Milenko Bošnjaković	(Bosnia and Herzegovina) Nevres Fejzić	No1	—
Velež	(Bosnia and Herzegovina) Nedim Jusufbegović	(Bosnia and Herzegovina) Denis Zvonić	Joma	Narentas
Zrinjski	(Croatia) Krunoslav Rendulić	(Bosnia and Herzegovina) Nemanja Bilbija	Macron	M.T. Abraham Group
Željezničar	(Bosnia and Herzegovina) Nermin Bašić	(Bosnia and Herzegovina) Samir Bekrić	Macron	The Maniacs

== League table ==
Pos	Team	Pld	W	D	L	GF	GA	GD	Pts	Qualification or relegation
1	Zrinjski Mostar (C)	33	25	3	5	66	21	+45	78	Qualification for the Champions League first qualifying round
2	Borac Banja Luka	33	18	4	11	39	32	+7	58	Qualification to Europa Conference League second qualifying round
3	Željezničar	33	15	8	10	42	35	+7	53	Qualification to Europa Conference League first qualifying round
4	Sarajevo	33	15	7	11	50	46	+4	52	Qualification to Europa Conference League first qualifying round
5	Široki Brijeg	33	13	9	11	38	36	+2	48	
6	Velež Mostar	33	11	12	10	40	37	+3	45	
7	Tuzla City	33	10	7	16	43	46	−3	37	
8	Igman Konjic	33	9	10	14	42	48	−6	37	
9	Sloga Doboj	33	10	7	16	40	55	−15	37	
10	Posušje	33	10	7	16	28	46	−18	37	
11	Leotar (R)	33	9	7	17	29	46	−17	34	Relegation to the Prva Liga RS
12	Sloboda Tuzla (R)	33	7	11	15	32	41	−9	32	Relegation to the Prva Liga FBiH

Source: Rezultati.com
Rules for classification: 1) Points; 2) Goal difference; 3) Goals scored; 4) Head-to-head points; 5) Head-to-head goal difference; 6) Head-to-head away goals (only if two teams); 7) Head-to-head goals scored; 8) Goal difference; 9) Play-off. (Criteria 2 and 3 are not used to decide champion, UEFA competition qualification, or relegation)
(C) Champions; (R) Relegated

== Results ==
=== Rounds 1–22 ===
Home \ Away	BOR	IGM	LEO	POS	SAR	SLO	SLG	ŠB	TUZ	VEL	ZRI	ŽEL
Borac	—	1–0	0–1	2–1	1–3	3–1	2–1	1–0	3–0	0–0	1–0	2–1
Igman	0–0	—	3–1	0–0	2–0	0–0	0–2	0–1	3–2	0–1	0–3	3–1
Leotar	0–1	1–1	—	0–1	2–0	0–0	4–1	1–0	4–0	1–0	1–1	0–1
Posušje	0–2	2–2	1–1	—	0–1	2–1	3–2	0–1	3–0	1–1	0–1	1–2
Sarajevo	1–0	3–1	3–0	1–0	—	1–1	4–2	0–0	1–5	0–1	0–2	0–0
Sloboda	2–0	5–1	2–1	0–1	2–0	—	4–2	0–3	0–0	1–1	0–1	1–1
Sloga	2–2	3–2	4–0	0–1	1–0	2–2	—	1–1	0–3	3–0	1–0	0–1
Široki Brijeg	2–0	3–2	1–0	1–0	1–3	2–0	3–0	—	1–0	0–0	1–1	1–0
Tuzla City	0–1	2–3	4–1	3–0	1–0	0–0	0–0	4–1	—	0–1	1–2	1–2
Velež	1–0	1–1	1–0	1–1	1–1	1–0	2–2	4–4	4–0	—	1–3	3–1
Zrinjski	1–0	4–0	4–1	5–0	4–1	1–0	3–0	3–0	0–0	1–0	—	1–2
Željezničar	1–2	1–0	1–1	1–1	2–2	1–0	1–0	1–1	4–2	2–0	0–1	—

Source: Football Association of Bosnia and Herzegovina
Legend: Blue = home team win; Yellow = draw; Red = away team win.
For upcoming matches, an "a" indicates there is an article about the rivalry between the two participants.

=== Rounds 23–33 ===
Home \ Away	BOR	IGM	LEO	POS	SAR	SLO	SLG	ŠB	TUZ	VEL	ZRI	ŽEL
Borac		1–0	2–0		1–0	3–2					0–3	2–0
Igman			2–0	3–0		1–1	3–0		0–1			
Leotar					0–3	0–0		2–1	3–2			1–0
Posušje	1–0		1–0			2–0				2–1	0–2	
Sarajevo		2–4		3–1			1–1	2–1	1–0			2–2
Sloboda					2–3		0–1	2–1	1–0			1–2
Sloga	2–1		1–1	2–0						0–2	1–3	
Široki Brijeg	2–3	0–0		1–1			1–0		1–1	1–0		
Tuzla City	2–2			3–1			1–2			1–1	3–0	
Velež	2–0	3–3	2–0		3–5	0–0					0–1	
Zrinjski		2–1	2–1		2–3	4–1		3–1				2–0
Željezničar		1–1		3–0			4–1	1–0	0–1	2–1		

Source: Football Association of Bosnia and Herzegovina
Legend: Blue = home team win; Yellow = draw; Red = away team win.
For upcoming matches, an "a" indicates there is an article about the rivalry between the two participants.

== Top goalscorers ==
Rank	Player	Club	Goals
1	(Bosnia and Herzegovina) Nemanja Bilbija	Zrinjski	24
2	(Bosnia and Herzegovina) Mirsad Ramić	Igman	19
3	(Bosnia and Herzegovina) Nermin Haskić	Velež	12
4	(Bosnia and Herzegovina) Bože Vukoja	Široki Brijeg	10
4	(Bosnia and Herzegovina) Momčilo Mrkaić	Borac	10
6	(North Macedonia) Mario Krstovski	Sloga	9
6	(Brazil) Renan Oliveira	Sarajevo	9
8	(Ghana) Joseph Amoah	Željezničar	8
8	(Bosnia and Herzegovina) Dal Varešanović	Sarajevo	8
8	(Croatia) Gabrijel Boban	Posušje	8
8	(Brazil) Clarismario Santos	Željezničar	8
