= 2026–27 Premier League of Bosnia and Herzegovina =

Premijer liga
- Season: 2026–27
- Dates: 7 August 2026 – 30 May 2027
- Matches: 67
- Goals: 174 (2.6 per match)
- Top goalscorer: Nemanja Bilbija; Antonio Ilić (11 goals each)
- Biggest home win: Borac 4–1 Radnik (8 November 2026)
- Biggest away win: Radnik 1–5 Zrinjski (16 August 2026)
- Highest scoring: BSK 4–4 Radnik (19 September 2026); Sloga 2–6 Zrinjski (11 October 2026)
- Longest winning run: Borac (8 matches)
- Longest unbeaten run: Zrinjski; Borac (8 matches each)
- Longest winless run: Željezničar; Radnik; Sloga (8 matches each)
- Longest losing run: Sloga (7 matches)
- Highest attendance: 19,800; Sarajevo 2–0 Željezničar (24 October 2026)
- Lowest attendance: 150; Sloga 0–1 Velež (1 November 2026)
- Total attendance: 213,147
- Average attendance: 3,181
- All statistics correct as of 21 November 2026.

The 2026–27 Premier League of Bosnia and Herzegovina (known as the Wwin League for sponsorship reasons) is the 27th season of the Premier League of Bosnia and Herzegovina, the highest football league of Bosnia and Herzegovina. The season began on 7 August 2026 and will end on 30 May 2027, with a winter break between mid December 2026 and early February 2027.

Borac Banja Luka are the defending champions, having won their fourth Premier League title in the previous season.

== Teams ==
Ten teams are contesting in the league – the top eight teams from the previous season and one promoted from each of the second-level leagues. The promoted teams are Čelik Zenica, who returned to the top flight after an absence of six years, and BSK Banja Luka, who earned promotion for the first time in their history. They replaced Posušje and Rudar Prijedor, who were relegated after respective spells of five years and one year in the top flight.

=== Stadiums and locations ===
Locations of the 2026–27 Premier League of BiH clubs

Note: Table lists in alphabetical order.

Team	Location	Stadium	Capacity
Borac	Banja Luka	Banja Luka City Stadium	10,030
BSK	Banja Luka	Stadion Krupa na Vrbasu (Note: BSK plays its home matches at Stadion Krupa na Vrbasu, since their home ground, Stadion Čaire, did not meet the required standards for Premier League games.)	3,500
Čelik	Zenica	Bilino Polje	13,694
Radnik	Bijeljina	Bijeljina City Stadium	6,000
Sarajevo	Sarajevo (Koševo)	Asim Ferhatović Hase	34,700
Sloga	Doboj	Luke Stadium	3,000
Široki Brijeg	Široki Brijeg	Pecara	7,000
Velež	Mostar (Vrapčići)	Stadion Rođeni	7,000
Zrinjski	Mostar	Stadion pod Bijelim Brijegom	9,000
Željezničar	Sarajevo (Grbavica)	Grbavica	13,057

=== Personnel and kits ===
Note: Flags indicate national team as has been defined under FIFA eligibility rules. Players and Managers may hold more than one non-FIFA nationality.

Team	Manager	Captain	Kit manufacturer	Shirt sponsor
Borac	(Bosnia and Herzegovina) Vinko Marinović	(Bosnia and Herzegovina) Srđan Grahovac	Kelme	Mtel
BSK	(Bosnia and Herzegovina) Bojan Puzigaća	(Bosnia and Herzegovina) Zoran Kvržić	Kelme	WWin
Čelik	(Bosnia and Herzegovina) Bojan Regoje	(Bosnia and Herzegovina) Kenan Horić	Macron	BetOle
Radnik	(Serbia) Bojan Krulj	(Bosnia and Herzegovina) Danilo Teodorović	Kelme	SoccerBet
Sarajevo	(Croatia) Zoran Zekić	(Bosnia and Herzegovina) Amar Beganović	Adidas	Turkish Airlines
Sloga	(Bosnia and Herzegovina) Duško Vranešević	(Croatia) Toni Jović	Macron	Meridian
Široki Brijeg	(Croatia) Marijo Tot	(Bosnia and Herzegovina) Tomislav Tomić	Kelme	WWin
Velež	(Croatia) Damir Milanović	(Bosnia and Herzegovina) Ante Hrkać	Puma	Narentas
Zrinjski	(Slovenia) Simon Rožman	(Bosnia and Herzegovina) Nemanja Bilbija	Macron	M.T. Abraham Group
Željezničar	Vacant	(Serbia) Aleksa Pejić	Macron	WWin

=== Managerial changes ===
Team	Outgoing manager	Manner of departure	Date of vacancy	Position in the table	Incoming manager	Date of appointment
Sarajevo	(Croatia) Mario Cvitanović	Mutual consent	4 June 2026	Pre-season	(Croatia) Zoran Zekić	9 June 2026
Radnik	(Bosnia and Herzegovina) Duško Vranešević	End of contract	5 June 2026	Pre-season	(Serbia) Bojan Krulj	11 June 2026
BSK	(Bosnia and Herzegovina) Igor Mirković	Mutual consent	7 June 2026	Pre-season	(Bosnia and Herzegovina) Bojan Puzigaća	27 June 2026
Zrinjski	(Croatia) Igor Štimac	Mutual consent	12 June 2026	Pre-season	(Slovenia) Simon Rožman	19 June 2026
Sloga	(Bosnia and Herzegovina) Nedim Jusufbegović	Mutual consent	30 June 2026	Pre-season	(Serbia) Perica Ognjenović	1 July 2026
Željezničar	(Bosnia and Herzegovina) Adin Mulaosmanović	End of interim spell	14 July 2026	Pre-season	(Spain) David Muslera Rodríguez	14 July 2026
Velež	(Bosnia and Herzegovina) Ibrahim Rahimić	Resigned	10 September 2026	9th	(Croatia) Damir Milanović	15 September 2026
Široki Brijeg	(Croatia) Damir Milanović	Mutual consent	15 September 2026	5th	(Croatia) Marijo Tot	15 September 2026
Sloga	(Serbia) Perica Ognjenović	Mutual consent	2 November 2026	10th	(Bosnia and Herzegovina) Duško Vranešević	10 November 2026
Željezničar	(Spain) David Muslera Rodríguez	Sacked	21 November 2026	7th		

== League table ==
Pos	Team	Pld	W	D	L	GF	GA	GD	Pts	Qualification or relegation
1	Zrinjski Mostar	14	12	1	1	33	8	+25	37	Qualification for the Champions League first qualifying round
2	Borac Banja Luka	13	11	1	1	31	10	+21	34	Qualification to Conference League first qualifying round
3	Sarajevo	14	6	5	3	12	8	+4	23	Qualification to Conference League first qualifying round
4	Široki Brijeg	14	4	5	5	14	16	−2	17	
5	BSK Banja Luka	14	4	4	6	21	23	−2	16	
6	Čelik Zenica	14	3	5	6	16	21	−5	14	
7	Velež Mostar	13	3	4	6	11	19	−8	13	
8	Željezničar	14	3	4	7	13	25	−12	13	
9	Radnik Bijeljina	14	2	6	6	20	27	−7	12	Relegation to the Prva Liga FBiH or Prva Liga RS
10	Sloga Doboj	14	2	3	9	9	23	−14	9	Relegation to the Prva Liga FBiH or Prva Liga RS

Updated to match(es) played on 22 November 2026. Source: Rezultati.com
Rules for classification: 1) Points; 2) Goal difference; 3) Goals scored; 4) Head-to-head points; 5) Head-to-head goal difference; 6) Head-to-head away goals (only if two teams); 7) Head-to-head goals scored; 8) Goal difference; 9) Play-off. (Criteria 2 and 3 are not used to decide champion, UEFA competition qualification, or relegation)

== Results ==
Home \ Away	BOR	BSK	ČEL	RAD	SAR	SLG	ŠB	VEL	ZRI	ŽEL	BOR	BSK	ČEL	RAD	SAR	SLG	ŠB	VEL	ZRI	ŽEL
Borac	—	2–0	2–0	4–1		2–0		3–1	1–0	2–0	—									
BSK		—	3–2	4–4	1–1	0–1		2–0	1–2	1–1		—								
Čelik	2–4		—	3–2	0–0	2–1	1–2	3–0	0–3				—							
Radnik	2–2			—	1–1	1–2	2–0	1–1	1–5	3–1				—						
Sarajevo	1–0	1–0		0–0	—	2–0	2–1		0–1	2–0					—					a
Sloga	1–2	1–3	0–0			—	0–1	0–1	2–6	1–1						—				
Široki Brijeg	2–3	1–1	0–0	2–1	1–2	0–0	—			2–1							—			
Velež		2–3	1–1	1–1	1–0	2–0	0–0	—	a									—	a	
Zrinjski		3–1	2–1	1–0	0–0		2–1	2–0	—	2–0								a	—	
Željezničar	0–4	2–1	1–1		2–0		1–1	3–1	0–4	—					a					—

Updated to match(es) played on 22 November 2026. Source: Football Association of Bosnia and Herzegovina
Legend: Blue = home team win; Yellow = draw; Red = away team win.
For upcoming matches, an "a" indicates there is an article about the rivalry between the two participants.

== Season statistics ==
As of 21 November 2026

=== Top goalscorers ===
Rank	Player	Club	Goals
1	(Bosnia and Herzegovina) Nemanja Bilbija	Zrinjski	11
1	(Croatia) Antonio Ilić	Zrinjski	11
3	(Bosnia and Herzegovina) Danilo Teodorović	Radnik	9
4	(Bosnia and Herzegovina) Luka Juričić	Borac	8
5	(Bosnia and Herzegovina) Anes Mašić	Čelik	7
6	(Bosnia and Herzegovina) David Čavić	BSK	6
6	(Croatia) Mario Ćuže	Zrinjski	6
8	(Bosnia and Herzegovina) Matej Deket	Borac	5
8	(Bosnia and Herzegovina) Stefan Marčetić	BSK	5
10	(Bosnia and Herzegovina) Filip Matić	Široki Brijeg	4

==== Hat-tricks ====
Player	For	Against	Result	Date
(Bosnia and Herzegovina) Anes Mašić	Čelik	Velež	3–0 (H)	28 August 2026
(Bosnia and Herzegovina) Anes Mašić	Čelik	Radnik	3–2 (H)	11 September 2026
(Croatia) Mario Ćuže	Zrinjski	Sloga	6–2 (A)	11 October 2026

=== Clean sheets ===
Rank	Player	Club	Clean sheets
1	(Croatia) Ivan Banić	Sarajevo	7
2	(Bosnia and Herzegovina) Goran Karačić	Zrinjski	6
3	(Bosnia and Herzegovina) Mladen Jurkas	Borac	5
4	(Bosnia and Herzegovina) Ivan Puljić	Široki Brijeg	4
4	(Bosnia and Herzegovina) Arman Šutković	Čelik	4
6	(Spain) Pere García	Sloga	3
6	(Bosnia and Herzegovina) Faris Ribić	Velež	3
