= Mario Krstovski =

Macedonian footballer (born 1998)

Personal information
- Date of birth: 3 April 1998 (age 28)
- Place of birth: Kočani, Macedonia
- Height: 1.83 m (6 ft 0 in)
- Position: Forward

Team information
- Current team: İstanbulspor
- Number: 77

Youth career
- –2014: Horizont

Senior career*
| Years | Team | Apps | (Gls) |
| 2014–2017 | Horizont | 28 | (3) |
| 2017–2021 | Akademija Pandev | 92 | (14) |
| 2020 | → Rabotnički (loan) | 4 | (0) |
| 2021–2022 | Zrinjski Mostar | 0 | (0) |
| 2021 | → Makedonija G.P. (loan) | 7 | (0) |
| 2022 | → Leotar (loan) | 11 | (2) |
| 2022–2023 | Sloga Meridian | 24 | (9) |
| 2023–2025 | Domžale | 44 | (10) |
| 2025– | İstanbulspor | 46 | (8) |

International career
| 2014 | Macedonia U17 | 3 | (0) |
| 2018–2019 | North Macedonia U21 | 6 | (1) |
- * Club domestic league appearances and goals as of 6 May 2026

Mario Krstovski (born 3 April 1998) is a Macedonian professional footballer who plays as a forward for TFF 1. Lig club İstanbulspor.

== Club career ==
=== Zrinjski Mostar ===
In July 2021, Krstovski signed for Bosnian Premier League club Zrinjski Mostar on a free transfer. He was then sent on loans to Makedonija G.P. and Leotar in 2021 and 2022, respectively.

=== Sloga Meridian ===
After a year with Zrinjski, Krstovski joined newly promoted Bosnian Premier League club Sloga Meridian.

== Career statistics ==
As of 28 May 2023.

Appearances and goals by club, season and competition
| Club | Season | League | | | National cup | | Continental | | Other | | Total | |
| Club | Season | Division | Apps | Goals | Apps | Goals | Apps | Goals | Apps | Goals | Apps | Goals |
|---|---|---|---|---|---|---|---|---|---|---|---|---|
| Horizont | 2014–15 | 1. MFL | 11 | 0 | 3 | 0 | — | | 1 (Note: Appearance(s) in Macedonian First Football League promotion/relegation play-offs) | 0 | 15 | 0 |
| Horizont | 2015–16 | 1. MFL | 17 | 3 | 4 | 0 | — | | 1 | 0 | 22 | 3 |
| Horizont | Total | | 28 | 3 | 7 | 0 | 0 | 0 | 2 | 0 | 37 | 3 |
| Akademija Pandev | 2017–18 | 1. MFL | 16 | 0 | 3 | 1 | — | | — | | 19 | 1 |
| Akademija Pandev | 2018–19 | 1. MFL | 33 | 5 | 3 | 2 | — | | — | | 36 | 7 |
| Akademija Pandev | 2019–20 | 1. MFL | 12 | 2 | 0 | 0 | 2 (Note: Appearance(s) in UEFA Europa League) | 0 | — | | 14 | 2 |
| Akademija Pandev | 2020–21 | 1. MFL | 31 | 7 | 3 | 0 | — | | — | | 34 | 7 |
| Akademija Pandev | Total | | 92 | 14 | 9 | 3 | 2 | 0 | 0 | 0 | 103 | 17 |
| Rabotnički (loan) | 2019–20 | 1. MFL | 4 | 0 | 1 | 1 | — | | — | | 5 | 1 |
| Zrinjski Mostar | 2021–22 | Bosnian Premier League | 0 | 0 | 0 | 0 | — | | — | | 0 | 0 |
| Makedonija G.P. (loan) | 2021–22 | 1. MFL | 7 | 0 | 0 | 0 | — | | — | | 7 | 0 |
| Leotar (loan) | 2021–22 | Bosnian Premier League | 11 | 2 | 0 | 0 | — | | — | | 11 | 2 |
| Sloga Meridian | 2022–23 | Bosnian Premier League | 24 | 9 | 2 | 0 | — | | — | | 26 | 9 |
| Career total | | | 166 | 28 | 19 | 4 | 2 | 0 | 2 | 0 | 189 | 32 |

== Honours ==
Akademija Pandev

- Macedonian Football Cup: 2018–19
