= Mostar derby =

Football rivalry

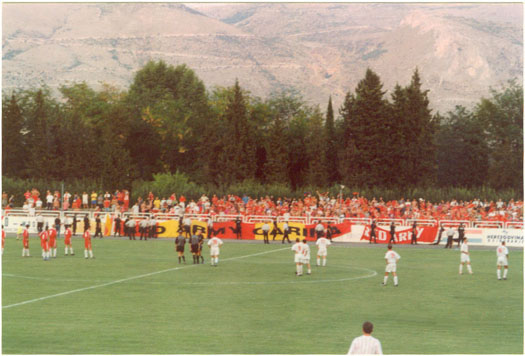
- Velež's fans at the derby on 30 June 2001
- Other names: Mostarski gradski derbi
- Location: Mostar, Bosnia and Herzegovina
- Teams: Zrinjski and Velež
- First meeting: September 1922
- Latest meeting: Zrinjski 2–0 Velež (19 September 2026)

Statistics
- Total meetings: 77
- Most wins: Zrinjski (45)
- All-time series: Zrinjski (45); Velež (21); Drawn (11)

The Mostar derby (Serbo-Croatian: Mostarski gradski derbi) is a football rivalry in Mostar, Bosnia and Herzegovina between HŠK Zrinjski and FK Velež. The derby took place for the first time in 1922 and is the oldest major football derby in Bosnia and Herzegovina. This fixture has been recognized internationally, being featured among FourFourTwo’s 50 Biggest Derbies in the World.

Both Mostar clubs are among the oldest in the country. HŠK Zrinjski (Croatian: Hrvatski športski klub Zrinjski, English: Croatian Sports Club Zrinjski) was formed in 1905 while FK Velež was formed in 1922. However, the clubs had vastly different histories. Zrinjski was a reasonably successful club in the first half of the century, but was banned by communist Yugoslav authorities for competing in the 1. HNL under the Ustaše regime during World War II. At this point its records, along with those of other Croatian clubs, were destroyed. On the other hand, FK Velež thrived during the Yugoslav communist period, winning the Yugoslav Cup in 1981 and 1986.

After the independence of Bosnia and Herzegovina, Zrinjski was reestablished. At the same time, war broke out in the country. Over the course of the war and in its aftermath Mostar became a divided city with the Croats holding the west side and the Bosniaks the east, with those remaining Serbs living in the east as well. Zrinjski took over Velež's Bijeli Brijeg Stadium, as it was located deep inside the informal Croat territory of the Federation of Bosnia and Herzegovina, thus forcing Velež to move to Vrapčići stadium (later renamed to Rođeni Stadium).

The two clubs did not meet until 2000 for their first game in the Bosnian Premier League. This happened because the nation's three ethnic groups each ran their own parallel leagues up until that point, with Velež in the Bosnian First League and Zrinjski in the First League of Herzeg-Bosnia.

== Results ==
=== Derby from 1922–1939 ===
1. September 1922; Mostar: Velež – Zrinjski 2:1
2. 8 September 1922; Mostar: Velež – Zrinjski 1:0
3. 13 April 1923; Mostar: Zrinjski – Velež 2:0
4. 29 April 1923; Mostar: Velež – Zrinjski 2:0
5. 1 May 1923; Mostar: Velež – Zrinjski 2:2
6. 15 July 1923; Mostar: Zrinjski – Velež 3:0
7. 1923; Mostar: Zrinjski – Velež 4:0
8. 11 November 1923; Mostar: Zrinjski – Velež 3:0
9. 31 August 1924; Mostar: Zrinjski – Velež 1:0
10. 25 July 1928; Sarajevo: Zrinjski – Velež 4:0
11. 26 July 1931; Mostar: Zrinjski – Velež 5:1
12. 7 January 1934; Mostar: Velež – Zrinjski 2:1
13. 25 February 1934; Mostar: Velež – Zrinjski 2:1
14. December 1934; Mostar: Velež – Zrinjski 2:1
15. 14 April 1935; Mostar: Zrinjski – Velež 3:1
16. 6 March 1938; Mostar: Velež – Zrinjski 4:2
17. 1938; Mostar: Zrinjski – Velež 1:0
18. 12 February 1939; Mostar: Velež – Zrinjski 2:1
19. 19 March 1939; Mostar: Zrinjski – Velež 4:2

From 17 May 1931 until 19 March 1939, 16 championship matches had been played between the two teams. Velež won 8 matches while Zrinjski won 4. No further information is available.

=== Modern derby ===
| # | Date | Competition | Venue | Score | Goals (Velež) | Goals (Zrinjski) | Attendance | H2H |
|---|---|---|---|---|---|---|---|---|
| 1 | 1 March 2000 | Friendly | Koševo, Sarajevo | 2–2 | Serdarević, Teletović | Miloš (2) | 6,000 | 0 |
| 2 | 13 August 2000 | Premier League | Bijeli Brijeg | 2–0 | | Buhić, Jurić | 10,000 | +1 |
| 3 | 24 February 2001 | Premier League | Vrapčići | 2–0 | Serdarević, Remetić | | 3,000 | 0 |
| 4 | 25 November 2001 | Premier League | Bijeli Brijeg | 1–0 | | Marenzi | 9,000 | +1 |
| 5 | 25 May 2002 | Premier League | Vrapčići | 2–0 | Vojvodić, Zaimović | | 4,000 | 0 |
| 6 | 24 November 2002 | Premier League | Bijeli Brijeg | 1–0 | | Ivanković | 10,000 | +1 |
| 7 | 24 May 2003 | Premier League | Vrapčići | 4–1 | Zubanović (2), Velagić, Buhovac (o.g.) | Džinović | 4,500 | 0 |
| 8 | 28 October 2006 | Premier League | Vrapčići | 2–1 | Kajtaz, Obad | Joldić | 5,000 | +1 |
| 9 | 5 May 2007 | Premier League | Bijeli Brijeg | 2–1 | Stokić | Rajović, Kordić | 6,000 | 0 |
| 10 | 11 November 2007 | Premier League | Bijeli Brijeg | 2–0 | | Žižović, Matko | 4,000 | +1 |
| 11 | 17 May 2008 | Premier League | Vrapčići | 1–0 | Škaljić | | 5,000 | 0 |
| 12 | 13 September 2008 | Premier League | Vrapčići | 0–2 | | Kordić, Đurić | 3,000 | +1 |
| 13 | 8 April 2009 | Premier League | Bijeli Brijeg | 2–1 | Čolić | Stojanović, Vuković | 6,000 | +2 |
| 14 | 4 October 2009 | Premier League | Bijeli Brijeg | 2–1 | Zaimović | M. Aničić, Kordić | 8,000 | +3 |
| 15 | 21 April 2010 | Premier League | Vrapčići | 0–0 | | | 5,200 | +3 |
| 16 | 25 August 2010 | Premier League | Bijeli Brijeg | 2–0 | | Zadro, Sušić | 5,500 | +4 |
| 17 | 26 February 2011 | Premier League | Vrapčići | 1–0 | Velagić | | 4,000 | +3 |
| 18 | 28 September 2011 | Cup (round of 16) | Bijeli Brijeg | 0–1^{1} | Demić | | 6,000 | +2 |
| 19 | 2 October 2011 | Premier League | Bijeli Brijeg | 1–0 | | Džidić | 0 | +3 |
| 20 | 19 October 2011 | Cup (round of 16) | Vrapčići | 2–0 | Brković, Kodro | | 1,500 | +2 |
| 21 | 29 April 2012 | Premier League | Vrapčići | 3–1 | Okić, Zvonić, Demić | Miličević | 2,000 | +1 |
| 22 | 25 November 2012 | Premier League | Bijeli Brijeg | 2–1 | Hajdarević | Arežina, I. Aničić | 4,000 | +2 |
| 23 | 26 May 2013 | Premier League | Vrapčići | 1–1 | Majkić | Bekić | 2,200 | +2 |
| 24 | 3 November 2013 | Premier League | Bijeli Brijeg | 0–0 | | | 2,000 | +2 |
| 25 | 10 May 2014 | Premier League | Vrapčići | 1–0 | Hebibović | | 2,500 | +1 |
| 26 | 27 September 2014 | Premier League | Bijeli Brijeg | 2–0 | | Crnov, Nikolić | 4,000 | +2 |
| 27 | 11 March 2015 | Cup (Quarter-final) | Bijeli Brijeg | 2–2 | Hebibović (2) | Kordić, Stojkić | 4,000 | +2 |
| 28 | 18 March 2015 | Cup (Quarter-final) | Vrapčići | 0–2 | | Stojkić, Nikolić | 5,000 | +3 |
| 29 | 26 April 2015 | Premier League | Vrapčići | 1–1 | Škahić | Crnov | 3,000 | +3 |
| 30 | 24 October 2015 | Premier League | Vrapčići | 0–1 | | Stojkić | 2,000 | +4 |
| 31 | 4 May 2016 | Premier League | Bijeli Brijeg | 1–0 | | Bilbija | 4,500 | +5 |
| 32 | 19 October 2016 | Cup (round of 16) | Bijeli Brijeg | 3–0 | | Mrkaić, Stojanović, Jović | 2,500 | +6 |
| 33 | 26 October 2016 | Cup (round of 16) | Vrapčići | 1–2 | Ćemalović | Jović (2) | 800 | +7 |
| 34 | 28 July 2019 | Premier League | Bijeli Brijeg | 1–0 | | Zvonić (o.g.) | 8,000 | +8 |
| 35 | 19 October 2019 | Premier League | Rođeni | 1–0 | Zvonić | | 5,000 | +7 |
| 36 | 8 August 2020 | Premier League | Rođeni | 2–0 | Cvijanović, Mulić | | 0 | +6 |
| 37 | 31 October 2020 | Premier League | Bijeli Brijeg | 3–1 | Mulić | Bilbija (3) | 0 | +7 |
| 38 | 8 May 2021 | Premier League | Bijeli Brijeg | 1–1 | Vehabović | Bilbija | 0 | +7 |
| 39 | 15 September 2021 | Premier League | Bijeli Brijeg | 2–1 | Zajmović | Jakovljević, Bilbija | 5,500 | +8 |
| 40 | 15 October 2021 | Premier League | Rođeni | 0–1 | | Bilbija | 0 | +9 |
| 41 | 10 May 2022 | Premier League | Bijeli Brijeg | 1–1 | Brandao | Bilbija | 4,500 | +9 |
| 42 | 12 October 2022 | Premier League | Bijeli Brijeg | 1–0 | | Bekić | 7,000 | +10 |
| 43 | 8 March 2023 | Premier League | Rođeni | 1–3 | Haskić | Ilinković, Kiš, Ivančić | 4,200 | +11 |
| 44 | 23 April 2023 | Premier League | Rođeni | 0–1 | | Kiš | 5,000 | +12 |
| 45 | 17 May 2023 | Cup (final) | Bilino Polje, Zenica | 0–1 | | Ćuže | 5,000 | +13 |
| 46 | 18 October 2023 | Premier League | Bijeli Brijeg | 3–0 | | Ćuže, Jakovljević (2) | 4,700 | +14 |
| 47 | 13 November 2023 | Premier League | Rođeni | 3–0 | Haskić, Guliashvili (2) | | 4,000 | +13 |
| 48 | 13 April 2024 | Premier League | Bijeli Brijeg | 1–0 | | Ćuže | 5,500 | +14 |
| 49 | 28 September 2024 | Premier League | Rođeni | 0–1 | | Mulahusejnović | 3,000 | +15 |
| 50 | 1 March 2025 | Premier League | Bijeli Brijeg | 1–0 | | Abramović | 4,800 | +16 |
| 51 | 3 May 2025 | Premier League | Rođeni | 0–1 | | Kiš | 4,000 | +17 |
| 52 | 27 September 2025 | Premier League | Rođeni | 1–3 | Đurić | Babić (o.g.), Savić, Ćuže | 3,000 | +18 |
| 53 | 7 December 2025 | Premier League | Bijeli Brijeg | 1–1 | Milak | Bilbija | 5,000 | +18 |
| 54 | 3 April 2026 | Premier League | Rođeni | 0–1 | | Bilbija | 4,500 | +19 |
| 55 | 6 May 2026 | Cup (final) | Bijeli Brijeg | 1–0 | | Bilbija | 7,200 | +20 |
| 56 | 13 May 2026 | Cup (final) | Bijeli Brijeg | 1–1 | Spahić | Bilbija | 6,600 | +20 |
| 57 | 26 May 2026 | Premier League | Bijeli Brijeg | 3–0 | | Bilbija (2), Nalić | 7,000 | +21 |
| 58 | 19 September 2026 | Premier League | Bijeli Brijeg | 2–0 | | Bilbija, Ivančić | 4,500 | +22 |

^{1} The match was abandoned after the hooligans of Zrinjski stormed the pitch and started chasing Velež players with various items. The field storm took place in the last minutes of the game just after Velež scored for 0–1 against their city rivals. The disciplinary and contest commission decided to award a 0–3 win to Velež, suspended "Bijeli Brijeg", Zrinjski home stadium, for 5 matches and punished Zrinjski with a fine.

| Colors | |
|---|---|
| | Won FK Velež |
| | Drawn |
| | Won HŠK Zrinjski |

== All competitions ==
As of match played 19 September 2026

The Mostar derby is currently played four times a year in the Premier League, but they may also play against one another in other competitions. There are also friendly matches and games played in various tournaments. Although these games are not included in official statistics.

| | Matches | Wins | | Draws | Goals | |
| | Matches | Velež | Zrinjski | Draws | Velež | Zrinjski |
|---|---|---|---|---|---|---|
| Derby from 1922–1939 | 19 | 8 | 10 | 1 | 23 | 39 |
| Bosnian Premier League | 49 | 11 | 30 | 8 | 37 | 60 |
| Bosnian Cup | 9 | 2 | 5 | 2 | 7 | 12 |
| Total | 77 | 21 | 45 | 11 | 67 | 111 |

== Head-to-head league ranking in Bosnia and Herzegovina ==
| P. | 01 | 02 | 03 | 04 | 05 | 06 | 07 | 08 | 09 | 10 | 11 | 12 | 13 | 14 | 15 | 16 | 17 | 18 | 19 | 20 | 21 | 22 | 23 | 24 | 25 | 26 |
|---|---|---|---|---|---|---|---|---|---|---|---|---|---|---|---|---|---|---|---|---|---|---|---|---|---|---|
| 1 | | | | | 1 | | | | 1 | | | | | 1 | | 1 | 1 | 1 | | | | 1 | 1 | | 1 | |
| 2 | | | | | | | 2 | | | | | | | | | | | | 2 | | | | | 2 | | 2 |
| 3 | | | | | | 3 | | | | | | | | | 3 | | | | | 3 | 3 | | | 3 | | |
| 4 | | | | | | | | 4 | | 4 | | | | | | | | | | | | | | | | 4 |
| 5 | 5 | 5 | | | | | | | | | | | | 5 | | | | | | | 5 | 5 | | | | |
| 6 | | | | | | | | | | | | 6 | | | | | | | | | | | 6 | | | |
| 7 | | | | | | | | | | 7 | 7 | | | | | | | | | | | | | | 7 | |
| 8 | | 8 | | | | | 8 | 8 | | | | | | | | | | | | 8 | | | | | | |
| 9 | | | | | | | | | | | | | 9 | | 9 | | | | | | | | | | | |
| 10 | | | | | | | | | | | | | | | | | | | | | | | | | | |
| 11 | | | 11 | 11 | | | | | | | | 11 | | | | | | | | | | | | | | |
| 12 | | | | | | | | | 12 | | | | | | | | | | | | | | | | | |
| 13 | 13 | | | | | | | | | | 13 | | 13 | | | | | | | | | | | | | |
| 14 | | | | | | | | | | | | | | | | | | | | | | | | | | |
| 15 | | | | | | | | | | | | | | | | | | | | | | | | | | |
| 16 | | | | | | | | | | | | | | | | 16 | | | | | | | | | | |
| 17 | | | 17 | | | | | | | | | | | | | | | | | | | | | | | |
Second tier
| 1 | | | | | | 1 | | | | | | | | | | | | | 1 | | | | | | | |
| 2 | | | | 2 | 2 | | | | | | | | | | | | | | | | | | | | | |
| 3 | | | | | | | | | | | | | | | | | | 3 | | | | | | | | |
| 4 | | | | | | | | | | | | | | | | | | | | | | | | | | |
| 5 | | | | | | | | | | | | | | | | | | | | | | | | | | |
| 6 | | | | | | | | | | | | | | | | | | | | | | | | | | |
| 7 | | | | | | | | | | | | | | | | | | | | | | | | | | |
| 8 | | | | | | | | | | | | | | | | | | | | | | | | | | |
| 9 | | | | | | | | | | | | | | | | | | | | | | | | | | |
| 10 | | | | | | | | | | | | | | | | | | | | | | | | | | |
| 11 | | | | | | | | | | | | | | | | | 11 | | | | | | | | | |

• Total: FK Velež 2 times higher, HŠK Zrinjski 24 times higher. Source: rsssf.com
