= Toni Jović =

Croatian footballer (born 1992)

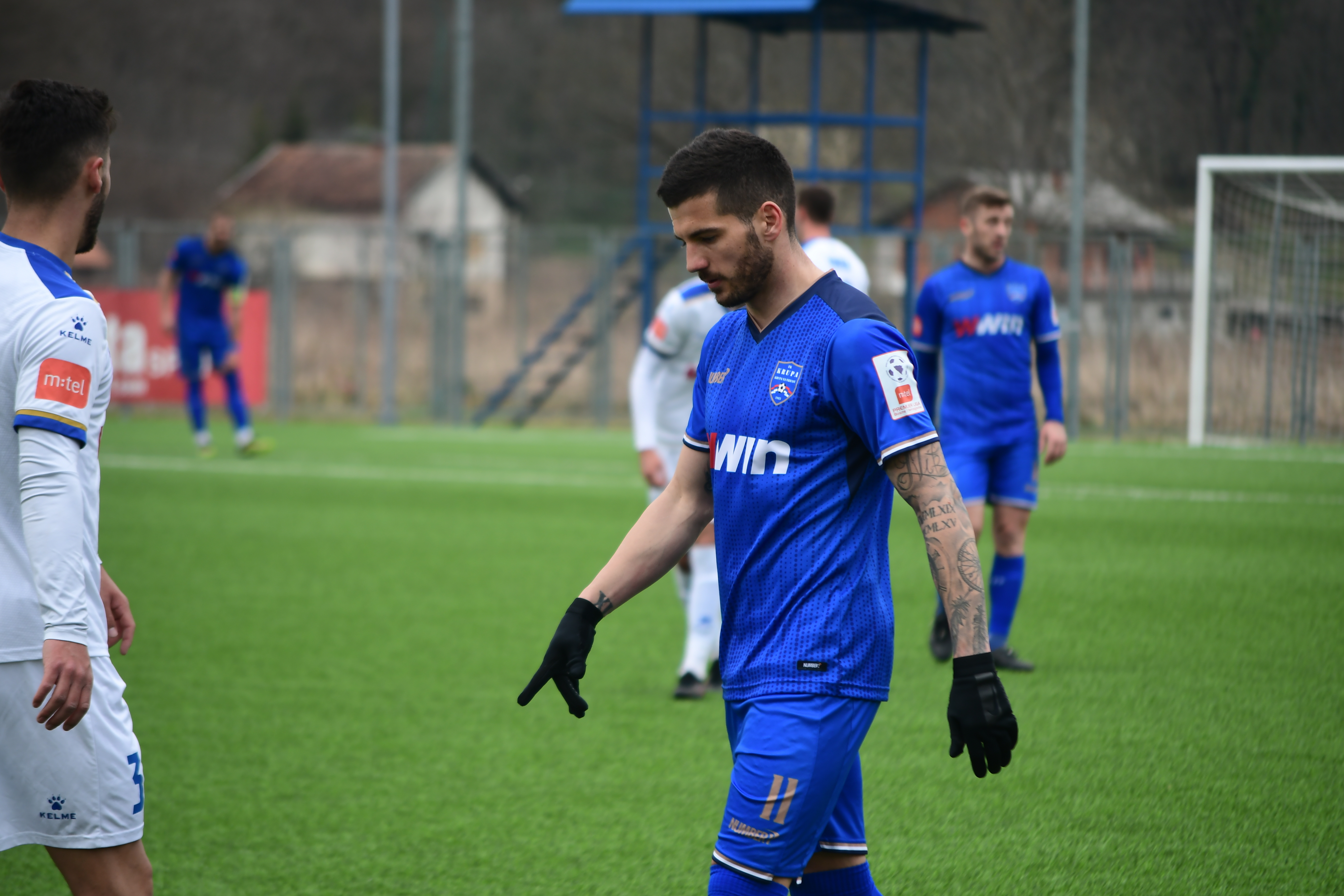
- Jović with Krupa in 2021

Personal information
- Date of birth: 2 September 1992 (age 34)
- Place of birth: Nova Gradiška, Croatia
- Height: 1.78 m (5 ft 10 in)
- Position: Centre-forward

Team information
- Current team: Sloga Doboj
- Number: 92

Youth career
- 2002–2007: Sloga Nova Gradiška
- 2007: Mladost Cernik
- 2007–2011: Rijeka

Senior career*
| Years | Team | Apps | (Gls) |
| 2011–2014 | Rijeka | 0 | (0) |
| 2011–2012 | → Krk (loan) | 30 | (5) |
| 2012–2013 | → Pomorac (loan) | 11 | (0) |
| 2013 | → Grobničan (loan) | 15 | (1) |
| 2013–2014 | → Krk (loan) | 26 | (14) |
| 2014–2016 | Borac Banja Luka | 50 | (9) |
| 2016–2019 | Zrinjski Mostar | 49 | (5) |
| 2019 | Sportfreunde Lotte | 17 | (2) |
| 2019–2020 | Široki Brijeg | 29 | (10) |
| 2021 | Krupa | 11 | (1) |
| 2021–2022 | Águilas | 16 | (1) |
| 2022 | Borac Banja Luka | 7 | (0) |
| 2022–2023 | Posušje | 25 | (4) |
| 2023 | Sloga Doboj | 12 | (5) |
| 2024 | Bunyodkor | 12 | (0) |
| 2024– | Sloga Doboj | 73 | (18) |
- * Club domestic league appearances and goals as of 20 September 2026

Toni Jović (born 2 September 1992) is a Croatian professional footballer who plays as a centre-forward for Bosnian Premier League club Sloga Doboj.

== Club career ==
Jović made his debut in the German 3. Liga for Sportfreunde Lotte on 25 January 2019, starting in a home match against 1860 Munich, which finished as a 1–1 draw. He left Sportfreunde Lotte in June 2019.

On 19 June 2019, Jović signed a one-and-a-half-year contract with Bosnian Premier League club Široki Brijeg. He made his official debut for Široki Brijeg on 11 July 2019, in a 1–2 home loss against Kairat in the 2019–20 UEFA Europa League first qualifying round. Jović scored his first goal for Široki in his first league game with the club, in a 2–2 away draw against Sloboda Tuzla. He left Široki Brijeg after his contract with the club expired in December 2020.

On 18 February 2021, Jović joined Krupa. He debuted in a league match against his former club Široki Brijeg, on 6 March 2021.

== Career statistics ==
As of match played 20 September 2026

Appearances and goals by club, season and competition
| Club | Season | League | | | National cup (Note: Includes Croatian Cup, Bosnian Cup, Uzbekistan Cup) | | Continental | | Total | |
| Club | Season | Division | Apps | Goals | Apps | Goals | Apps | Goals | Apps | Goals |
|---|---|---|---|---|---|---|---|---|---|---|
| Krk (loan) | 2011–12 | 3. HNL | 30 | 5 | — | | — | | 30 | 5 |
| Pomorac (loan) | 2012–13 | 2. HNL | 11 | 0 | 1 | 0 | — | | 12 | 0 |
| Grobničan (loan) | 2012–13 | 3. HNL | 15 | 1 | — | | — | | 15 | 1 |
| Krk (loan) | 2013–14 | 3. HNL | 26 | 14 | — | | — | | 26 | 14 |
| Borac Banja Luka | 2014–15 | Bosnian Premier League | 26 | 3 | 7 | 1 | — | | 33 | 4 |
| Borac Banja Luka | 2015–16 | Bosnian Premier League | 24 | 6 | 4 | 1 | — | | 28 | 7 |
| Borac Banja Luka | Total | | 50 | 9 | 11 | 2 | — | | 61 | 11 |
| Zrinjski Mostar | 2016–17 | Bosnian Premier League | 16 | 1 | 5 | 3 | — | | 21 | 4 |
| Zrinjski Mostar | 2017–18 | Bosnian Premier League | 19 | 3 | 1 | 0 | 2 (Note: Appearances in the UEFA Champions League) | 0 | 22 | 3 |
| Zrinjski Mostar | 2018–19 | Bosnian Premier League | 14 | 1 | 2 | 0 | 5 (Note: Two appearances in the UEFA Champions League, three appearances in UEFA Europa League) | 1 | 21 | 2 |
| Zrinjski Mostar | Total | | 49 | 5 | 8 | 3 | 7 | 1 | 64 | 9 |
| Sportfreunde Lotte | 2018–19 | 3. Liga | 17 | 2 | — | | — | | 17 | 2 |
| Široki Brijeg | 2019–20 | Bosnian Premier League | 13 | 5 | 2 | 0 | 2 (Note: Appearances in UEFA Europa League) | 0 | 17 | 5 |
| Široki Brijeg | 2020–21 | Bosnian Premier League | 16 | 5 | 2 | 0 | — | | 18 | 5 |
| Široki Brijeg | Total | | 29 | 10 | 4 | 0 | 2 | 0 | 35 | 10 |
| Krupa | 2020–21 | Bosnian Premier League | 11 | 1 | — | | — | | 11 | 1 |
| Águilas | 2021–22 | Segunda División RFEF | 16 | 1 | — | | — | | 16 | 1 |
| Borac Banja Luka | 2021–22 | Bosnian Premier League | 7 | 0 | 2 | 1 | — | | 9 | 1 |
| Posušje | 2022–23 | Bosnian Premier League | 25 | 4 | 2 | 1 | — | | 27 | 5 |
| Sloga Doboj | 2023–24 | Bosnian Premier League | 12 | 5 | 1 | 1 | — | | 13 | 6 |
| Bunyodkor | 2024 | Uzbekistan Super League | 12 | 0 | 3 | 1 | — | | 15 | 1 |
| Sloga Doboj | 2024–25 | Bosnian Premier League | 29 | 9 | 2 | 0 | — | | 31 | 9 |
| Sloga Doboj | 2025–26 | Bosnian Premier League | 36 | 9 | 4 | 1 | — | | 40 | 10 |
| Sloga Doboj | 2026–27 | Bosnian Premier League | 8 | 0 | 0 | 0 | — | | 8 | 0 |
| Sloga Doboj | Total | | 73 | 18 | 6 | 1 | — | | 79 | 19 |
| Career total | | | 383 | 75 | 38 | 9 | 9 | 1 | 430 | 85 |

== Honours ==
Rijeka

- Croatian Super Cup: 2014

Zrinjski Mostar

- Bosnian Premier League: 2016–17, 2017–18
