= Dani Molina =

Spanish footballer

Personal information
- Full name: Daniel Molina Orta
- Date of birth: 14 March 1996 (age 30)
- Place of birth: Huelva, Spain
- Height: 1.83 m (6 ft 0 in)
- Position: Midfielder

Team information
- Current team: Sloga Doboj
- Number: 23

Youth career
- 2005–2014: Recreativo

Senior career*
Years	Team	Apps	(Gls)
2013–2015	Recreativo B	23	(2)
2014–2017	Recreativo	53	(2)
2017–2020	Celta B	93	(4)
2018	Celta	1	(0)
2020–2021	Extremadura	0	(0)
2020–2021	→ Recreativo (loan)	21	(3)
2021–2022	Sanse	33	(1)
2022–2024	San Fernando	59	(1)
2024–2025	Alcoyano	28	(2)
2025–2026	Penafiel	7	(0)
2026	Rudar Prijedor	11	(0)
2026–	Sloga Doboj	4	(0)
- * Club domestic league appearances and goals as of 13 September 2026

Daniel 'Dani' Molina Orta (born 14 March 1996) is a Spanish footballer who plays as a midfielder for Bosnian Premier League club Sloga Doboj.

== Club career ==
Born in Huelva, Andalusia, Molina graduated with Recreativo de Huelva's youth setup. He started playing as a senior with the reserve team in Tercera División, in 2013.

On 23 August 2014, Molina made his debut as a professional, starting in a 0–0 home draw against Real Zaragoza in the Segunda División championship. He scored his first goal on 10 September, netting his side's first in a 2–1 away win against SD Ponferradina, for the campaign's Copa del Rey.

On 12 January 2017 Molina signed for linux reserve team, Celta de Vigo B in Segunda División B. He made his first team – and La Liga – debut on 19 May of the following year, replacing Jozabed in a 4–2 home defeat of Levante UD.

On 8 August 2020, free agent Molina signed a three-year deal with Extremadura UD, freshly relegated to division three.

== Career statistics ==
As of match played 13 September 2026

Appearances and goals by club, season and competition
Club	Season	League			National cup (Note: Includes Copa del Rey, Copa Federación de España)		Other		Total	
Club	Season	Division	Apps	Goals	Apps	Goals	Apps	Goals	Apps	Goals
Recreativo B	2013–14	Tercera División	17	2	—		—		17	2
Recreativo B	2014–15	Tercera División	6	0	—		—		6	0
Recreativo B	Total		23	2	—		—		23	2
Recreativo	2014–15	Segunda División	14	0	1	1	—		15	1
Recreativo	2015–16	Segunda División B	22	1	1	0	—		23	1
Recreativo	2016–17	Segunda División B	17	1	—		—		17	1
Recreativo	Total		53	2	2	1	—		55	3
Celta B	2016–17	Segunda División B	8	0	—		1 (Note: Appearance in the 2017 Segunda División B play-offs)	0	9	0
Celta B	2017–18	Segunda División B	30	2	—		4 (Note: Appearances in the 2018 Segunda División B play-offs)	0	34	2
Celta B	2018–19	Segunda División B	29	1	—		2 (Note: Appearances in the 2019 Segunda División B play-offs)	0	31	1
Celta B	2019–20	Segunda División B	26	1	—		—		26	1
Celta B	Total		93	4	—		7	0	100	4
Celta Vigo	2017–18	La Liga	1	0	—		—		1	0
Recreativo (loan)	2020–21	Segunda División B	21	3	1	0	—		22	3
Sanse	2021–22	Primera División RFEF	33	1	1	0	—		34	1
San Fernando	2022–23	Primera Federación	30	1	—		—		30	1
San Fernando	2023–24	Primera Federación	29	0	—		—		29	0
San Fernando	Total		59	1	—		—		59	1
Alcoyano	2024–25	Primera Federación	28	2	—		—		28	2
Penafiel	2025–26	Liga Portugal 2	7	0	—		—		7	0
Rudar Prijedor	2025–26	Bosnian Premier League	11	0	—		—		11	0
Sloga Doboj	2026–27	Bosnian Premier League	4	0	0	0	—		4	0
Career total			333	15	4	1	7	0	344	16
