= 2023 Bosnia and Herzegovina Football Cup final =

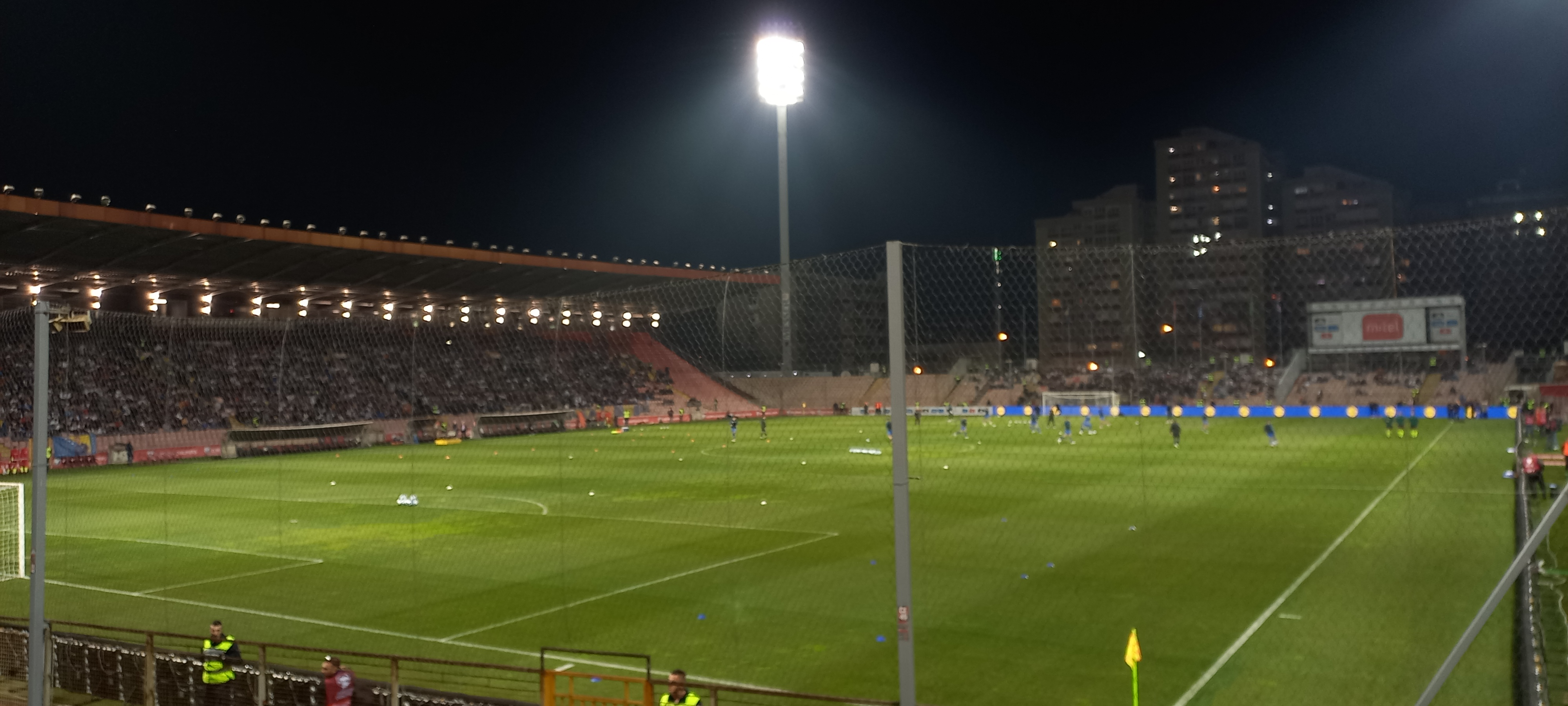
- The match took place at Bilino Polje Stadium
- Event: 2022–23 Bosnian Cup
Velež Mostar	Zrinjski Mostar
0	1
- Date: 17 May 2023
- Venue: Bilino Polje Stadium, Zenica
- Referee: Luka Bilbija (Prijedor)
- Attendance: 5,000

The 2023 Bosnia and Herzegovina Football Cup final was an association football match played at Bilino Polje Stadium in Zenica, Bosnia and Herzegovina, on 17 May 2023. Velež Mostar and Zrinjski Mostar were the finalists, making it the first Mostar derby in a cup final.

Zrinjski won the trophy for the second time in the club's history.

== Route to the final ==
Velež Mostar		Round	Zrinjski Mostar	
Opponent	Result		Opponent	Result
TOŠK Tešanj	2–0	First round	Zvijezda 09	4–0
Posušje	2–0	Second round	Laktaši	4–0
Sloga Meridian	7–0 (agg.)	Quarter-finals	Radnik Bijeljina	5–1 (agg.)
Željezničar	3–1 (agg.)	Semi-finals	Tuzla City	7–0 (agg.)

== Match ==
=== Details ===
17 May 2023
18:00

Velež Mostar	0–1	Zrinjski Mostar
	Report	Ćuže 52'

Bilino Polje Stadium, Zenica
Attendance: 5,000
Referee: Luka Bilbija (Prijedor)

Velež Mostar	Zrinjski Mostar

Match rules

- 90 minutes
- Penalty shoot-out if scores level
- Nine named substitutes
- Maximum of five substitutions
