= Andro Babić =

Croatian footballer (born 2004)

Personal information
- Date of birth: 8 September 2004 (age 22)
- Place of birth: Rijeka, Croatia
- Height: 1.81 m (5 ft 11 in)
- Position: Defensive midfielder

Team information
- Current team: Académico de Viseu
- Number: 29

Youth career
- 2019–2023: Rijeka

Senior career*
Years	Team	Apps	(Gls)
2022–2025	Rijeka	1	(0)
2023–2024	→ Posušje (loan)	26	(0)
2025	→ Opatija (loan)	15	(0)
2025–2026	Velež Mostar	33	(1)
2026–	Académico de Viseu	0	(0)

International career
2021–2022	Croatia U18	8	(0)
2022–2023	Croatia U19	7	(0)
- * Club domestic league appearances and goals as of 22:37, 13 November 2026 (UTC)

Andro Babić (born 8 September 2004) is a Croatian professional footballer who plays as a defensive midfielder for Portuguese club Académico de Viseu.

== Club career ==
Born in Rijeka, Babić was a youth player at local HNK Rijeka. He made his only appearance for the club in the Croatian Football League on 16 October 2022, as a substitute for 17 minutes in a 3–0 home win over Lokomotiva Zagreb. He spent the 2023–24 season on loan at Posušje in the Premier League of Bosnia and Herzegovina, where he played regularly.

After a loan at Opatija in the Croatian Second League, Babić returned across the border on 29 July 2025, signing a two-year deal with Velež Mostar. His team reached the Bosnia and Herzegovina Football Cup final, losing 2–1 on aggregate to Mostar derby rivals Zrinjski Mostar in May 2026. He played four qualification matches in the UEFA Conference League at the start of 2026–27.

On 6 August 2026, Babić moved to Académico de Viseu, newly promoted to Portugal's Primeira Liga. He joined on a four-year deal, for an estimated fee of €250,000.

== International career ==
Babić represented Croatia at under-18 and under-19 level.
