= 2022–23 Bosnia and Herzegovina Football Cup =

Football tournament season

27th Bosnia and Herzegovina Football Cup
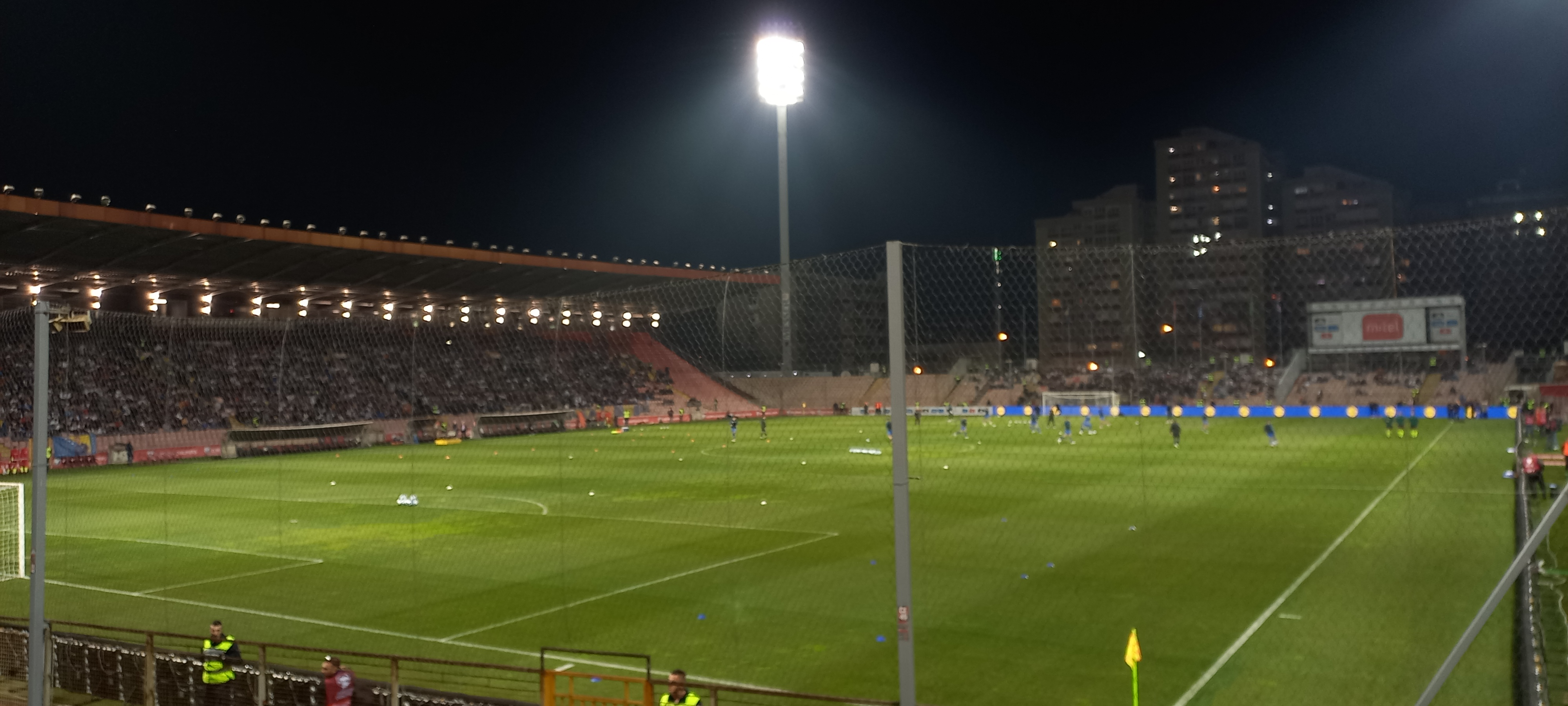
- Bilino Polje Stadium hosted the final on 17 May 2023

Tournament details
- Country: Bosnia and Herzegovina
- Dates: 18 October 2022 – 17 May 2023
- Teams: 32

Final positions
- Champions: Zrinjski Mostar (2nd title)
- Runners-up: Velež Mostar

Tournament statistics
- Matches played: 37
- Goals scored: 127 (3.43 per match)
- Top goal scorer(s): Nemanja Bilbija (5 goals)

The 2022–23 Bosnia and Herzegovina Football Cup was the 27th edition of Bosnia and Herzegovina's annual football cup, and the twenty second season of the unified competition.

Velež Mostar were the defending champions. Zrinjski Mostar won the cup after beating Velež in the final.

== Calendar ==
Round	Date(s)
1st Round	11 October 2022 (draw); 18 and 19 October 2022
2nd Round	21 November 2022 (draw); 18 and 19 February 2023
Quarter-finals	21 February 2023 (draw); 28 February and 1 March 2023 (leg 1); 14, 15 and 16 March 2023 (leg 2)
Semi-finals	23 March 2023 (draw); 5 April 2023 (leg 1); 19 April 2023 (leg 2)
Final	17 May 2023

== Bracket ==
Quarter-finals
Sloga Meridian	0	0	0
Velež Mostar	3	4	7
Tuzla City	5	2	7
Rudar Prijedor	0	0	0
Radnik Bijeljina	1	0	1
Zrinjski Mostar	3	2	5
Željezničar	2	3	5
Zvijezda Gradačac	1	2	3

Semi-finals
Velež Mostar	1	2	3
Željezničar	0	1	1
Tuzla City	0	0	0
Zrinjski Mostar	3	4	7

Final
Velež Mostar	0
Zrinjski Mostar	1

== First round ==
Played on 18 and 19 October 2022.

Home team	Away team	Result
Jedinstvo Bihać (II)	Sloga Meridian (I)	1–2
Laktaši (II)	Igman Konjic (I)	3–1
Čelik Zenica (III)	Sarajevo (I)	1–1 (5–4 p)
Zvijezda 09 (II)	Zrinjski Mostar (I)	0–4
Alfa Modriča (II)	Tuzla City (I)	2–5
Budućnost Banovići (II)	Željezničar (I)	1–2
Famos Hrasnica (III)	Široki Brijeg (I)	0–3
Baton (III)	Sloboda Tuzla (I)	2–8
Sloga Uskoplje (III)	Leotar (I)	1–3
TOŠK Tešanj (II)	Velež Mostar (I)	0–2
Krupa (II)	Borac Banja Luka (I)	1–3
Kolina (III)	Posušje (I)	1–5
Radnik Bijeljina (II)	Tekstilac Derventa (II)	2–0
Zvijezda Gradačac (II)	Gradina Srebrenik (II)	4–1
Sloboda Novi Grad (II)	Rudar Prijedor (II)	1–4
Rudar Han Bila (III)	Rudar Kakanj (II)	0–2

== Second round ==
Played on 18 and 19 February 2023.

Home team	Away team	Result
Rudar Prijedor (II)	Borac Banja Luka (I)	1–1 (6–5 p)
Velež Mostar (I)	Posušje (I)	2–0
Željezničar (I)	Leotar (I)	2–1
Zrinjski Mostar (I)	Laktaši (II)	4–0
Sloboda Tuzla (I)	Sloga Meridian (I)	1–1 (6–7 p)
Zvijezda Gradačac (II)	Rudar Kakanj (II)	3–1
Široki Brijeg (I)	Tuzla City (I)	2–2 (6–7 p)
Čelik Zenica (III)	Radnik Bijeljina (II)	0–0 (3–4 p)

== Quarter-finals ==
First legs were played on 28 February and 1 March, return legs were played on 14, 15 and 16 March 2023.

Team 1	Team 2	Leg 1	Leg 2	Agg. score
Sloga Meridian (I)	Velež Mostar (I)	0–3	0–4	0–7
Tuzla City (I)	Rudar Prijedor (II)	5–0	2–0	7–0
Radnik Bijeljina (II)	Zrinjski Mostar (I)	1–3	0–2	1–5
Željezničar (I)	Zvijezda Gradačac (II)	2–1	3–2	5–3

== Semi-finals ==
First legs were played on 5 April, return legs were played on 19 April 2023.

Team 1	Team 2	Leg 1	Leg 2	Agg. score
Velež Mostar (I)	Željezničar (I)	1–0	2–1	3–1
Tuzla City (I)	Zrinjski Mostar (I)	0–3	0–4	0–7

== Final ==
The final was played on 17 May 2023.

=== Details ===
17 May 2023
18:00

Velež Mostar	0–1	Zrinjski Mostar
	Report	Ćuže 52'

Bilino Polje Stadium, Zenica
Attendance: 5,000
Referee: Luka Bilbija (Prijedor)
