= Mario Ćuže =

Croatian footballer (born 1999)

Personal information
- Full name: Mario Ćuže
- Date of birth: 24 April 1999 (age 27)
- Place of birth: Metković, Croatia
- Height: 1.89 m (6 ft 2 in)
- Position: Winger

Team information
- Current team: Zrinjski Mostar
- Number: 25

Youth career
- 2009–2010: ONK Metković
- 2010–2013: Neretva
- 2013–2017: Dinamo Zagreb

Senior career*
Years	Team	Apps	(Gls)
2017–2023	Dinamo Zagreb	12	(2)
2017–2022	→ Dinamo Zagreb II	64	(9)
2019	→ Istra 1961 (loan)	18	(7)
2020	→ Lokomotiva (loan)	6	(0)
2021–2022	→ Dnipro-1 (loan)	26	(9)
2022–2023	→ Zrinjski Mostar (loan)	32	(7)
2023–2025	Zrinjski Mostar	45	(14)
2025–2026	Gangwon FC	2	(0)
2025–2026	→ Zrinjski Mostar (loan)	23	(3)
2026–	Zrinjski Mostar	8	(3)

International career
2014–2015	Croatia U16	8	(2)
2015–2016	Croatia U17	15	(2)
2017	Croatia U19	3	(0)
2019	Croatia U20	1	(0)
2019–2020	Croatia U21	8	(0)
2023	Croatia U23	1	(0)
- * Club domestic league appearances and goals as of 19 September 2026

Mario Ćuže (Croatian pronunciation: [mâːrio tɕǔːʒe]; born 24 April 1999) is a Croatian professional footballer who plays as a winger for Bosnian Premier League club Zrinjski Mostar.

== Club career ==
=== Dinamo Zagreb ===
Born in Metković, Dubrovnik-Neretva County, Ćuže progressed through the youth system of Dinamo Zagreb.

==== Istra 1961 (loan) ====
In 2019, Ćuže was sent on loan to Istra 1961 in the Croatian First Football League. He made his professional debut with the club on 26 July 2019, against Inter Zaprešić in the domestic league. Starting as a left winger that day, he stood out by scoring a brace, securing a 2–0 away win. On 3 August, only his second game, Ćuže scored a hat-trick in a 3–1 win over Varaždin, bringing his tally to five goals in only two professional appearances.

==== Lokomotiva (loan) ====
In August 2020, Ćuže was sent on loan to Lokomotiva for one season, but returned to Dinamo in October.

==== Dnipro-1 (loan) ====
In February 2021, Ćuže joined Ukrainian Premier League club Dnipro-1 on loan until the end of the season. He made his debut eight days later in a 2–0 win against Inhulets Petrove. He scored his first two goals for the club on 23 March to secure a 2–0 away win over Desna Chernihiv.

In July 2021, the deal was extended to a loan until 31 January 2022, as he faced tough competition in his position at Dinamo.

Ćuže spent the remainder of the 2021–22 season playing in the second division for Druga NL team Dinamo Zagreb II. On 2 May 2022, he scored one goal and provided an assist in a match against Dubrava that ended in a 3–1 victory.

==== Zrinjski Mostar (loan) ====
On 13 June 2022, Ćuže was sent on loan to Bosnian Premier League club Zrinjski Mostar. He made his debut for the club on 6 July, starting in the UEFA Champions League qualifier against Sheriff Tiraspol. On 28 July, Ćuže scored his first goal for Zrinjski in the UEFA Europa Conference League win over Tirana. His club eventually made it to the play-off round, where they lost on penalties to Slovan Bratislava.

== International career ==
Ćuže gained his first cap for the Croatia under-21 team on 5 September 2019 against the United Arab Emirates in a friendly match. His team won by a score of 3–0. On 11 October 2019, he made first assist during a 4–1 friendly win over Hungary.

== Career statistics ==
As of match played 19 September 2026

Appearances and goals by club, season and competition
Club	Season	League			National cup (Note: Includes Croatian Cup, Ukrainian Cup, Bosnian Cup, Korean Cup)		Continental		Other		Total	
Club	Season	Division	Apps	Goals	Apps	Goals	Apps	Goals	Apps	Goals	Apps	Goals
Dinamo Zagreb	2017–18	Prva HNL	0	0	0	0	0	0	—		0	0
Dinamo Zagreb	2018–19	Prva HNL	0	0	0	0	0	0	—		0	0
Dinamo Zagreb	2019–20	Prva HNL	12	2	1	0	—		—		13	2
Dinamo Zagreb	2020–21	Prva HNL	0	0	0	0	1 (Note: Appearance in UEFA Europa League)	0	—		1	0
Dinamo Zagreb	2021–22	Prva HNL	—		—		1 (Note: Appearance in UEFA Champions League)	0	—		1	0
Dinamo Zagreb	Total		12	2	1	0	2	0	—		15	2
Dinamo Zagreb II	2016–17	Druga HNL	10	2	—		—		—		10	2
Dinamo Zagreb II	2017–18	Druga HNL	29	3	—		—		—		29	3
Dinamo Zagreb II	2018–19	Druga HNL	21	4	—		—		—		21	4
Dinamo Zagreb II	2021–22	Druga HNL	14	3	—		—		—		14	3
Dinamo Zagreb II	Total		74	12	—		—		—		74	12
Istra 1961 (loan)	2019–20	Prva HNL	18	7	2	1	—		—		20	8
Lokomotiva (loan)	2020–21	Prva HNL	6	0	0	0	1	0	—		7	0
Dnipro-1 (loan)	2020–21	Ukrainian Premier League	12	7	1	0	—		—		13	7
Dnipro-1 (loan)	2021–22	Ukrainian Premier League	14	2	1	0	—		—		15	2
Dnipro-1 (loan)	Total		26	9	2	0	—		—		28	9
Zrinjski Mostar (loan)	2022–23	Bosnian Premier League	32	7	4	1	8 (Note: Two appearances in UEFA Champions League; six appearances and two goals in UEFA Europa Conference League)	2	—		44	10
Zrinjski Mostar	2023–24	Bosnian Premier League	28	12	6	4	14 (Note: Four appearances in UEFA Champions League; four appearances in UEFA Europa League; six appearances in UEFA Conference League)	0	—		48	16
Zrinjski Mostar	2024–25	Bosnian Premier League	17	2	1	1	6 (Note: Appearances in UEFA Conference League)	1	—		24	4
Zrinjski Mostar	Total		77	21	11	6	28	3	—		116	30
Gangwon FC	2025	K League 1	2	0	1	0	0	0	—		3	0
Zrinjski Mostar (loan)	2025–26	Bosnian Premier League	23	3	6	1	6	1	1 (Note: Appearance in Bosnian Supercup)	0	36	5
Zrinjski Mostar	2026–27	Bosnian Premier League	8	3	0	0	2	0	—		10	3
Zrinjski Mostar	Total		31	6	6	1	8	1	1	0	46	8
Career Total			246	57	23	8	39	4	1	0	309	69

== Honours ==
Dinamo Zagreb

- Croatian First League: 2019–20

Zrinjski Mostar

- Bosnian Premier League: 2022–23, 2024–25
- Bosnian Cup: 2022–23, 2023–24
