= Nedim Jusufbegović =

Bosnian football manager (born 1974)

Personal information
- Date of birth: 30 September 1974 (age 52)
- Place of birth: Sarajevo, SR Bosnia and Herzegovina, SFR Yugoslavia
- Height: 1.74 m (5 ft 9 in)
- Position: Striker

Youth career
- –1998: Sarajevo

Senior career*
Years	Team	Apps	(Gls)
1996–1998	Igman Konjic		
1998–2001	Sarajevo	63	(15)
2001–2002	Velež Mostar	25	(13)
2002–2005	Olimpija Ljubljana	63	(17)
2005	Željezničar	13	(1)
Total		164	(46)

International career
2001	Bosnia and Herzegovina	2	(0)

Managerial career
- 2011–2012: Olimpik
- 2013: Olimpik
- 2013–2015: Velež Mostar
- 2015–2016: Zvijezda Gradačac
- 2016: GOŠK Gabela
- 2016–2017: Čelik Zenica
- 2018–2019: Igman Konjic
- 2022: Bosnia and Herzegovina U17
- 2022–2023: Velež Mostar
- 2024–2025: Sloga Doboj
- 2026: Sloga Doboj
- * Club domestic league appearances and goals

Nedim Jusufbegović (born 30 September 1974) is a Bosnian professional football manager and former player.

== Club career ==
Jusufbegović was born in Sarajevo, SFR Yugoslavia, present-day Bosnia and Herzegovina. The first club he played for was Igman Konjic before moving on to hometown club Sarajevo, and later to Velež Mostar.

From there, Jusufbegović would transfer to the Slovenian PrvaLiga in 2002 and play for Olimpija Ljubljana for several years, scoring a total of 17 goals and making 63 appearances before he returned for the last stages of his career to be spent in the Bosnian side Željezničar.

His final season as a football player was at Željezničar, and he retired from the game at the end of the 2004–05 season.

== International career ==
Jusufbegović's very first match for Bosnia and Herzegovina was against South Africa on 8 August 2001, when Bosnia and Herzegovina defeated their opponent by 4–2 in the LG Cup held in Tehran, Iran.

The second and final match he played for the national team was two days subsequent to the victory against South Africa, in the same tournament, this time against the host nation Iran where Bosnia lost 4–0.

== Managerial career ==
Several years after retiring from football as a player, namely in 2011, Jusufbegović was employed as a manager by the newly revitalized Sarajevo club Olimpik. Not until September 2012 did he leave Olimpik, after having been nominated for manager of the year the very same year, coming back for a third time in the same position in April 2013.

In 2015, Jusufbegović left Velež Mostar after 2 years as the club's manager. After Velež, he managed Zvijezda Gradačac from 2015 to 2016, GOŠK Gabela in 2016, Čelik Zenica from 2016 to 2017 and Igman Konjic from 2018 to 2019. In August 2022, he became the new head coach of the Bosnia and Herzegovina U17 national team.

On 1 December 2022, Velež Mostar appointed Jusufbegović as manager for the second time. His first competitive game back in charge of Velež was a 2–0 home victory against Posušje in the Bosnian Cup on 18 February 2023. He led Velež to the cup final, where his side lost to rivals Zrinjski in the Mostar derby on 17 May 2023. On 23 August 2023, it was announced by Velež that Jusufbegović had left the club by mutual consent.

In September 2023, Jusufbegović was named as an assistant of newly appointed Bosnia and Herzegovina national team head coach Savo Milošević. Jusufbegović's contract with the Bosnian FA expired together with Milošević's one on 21 March 2024, following the country's defeat against Ukraine in the UEFA Euro 2024 qualifying play-offs.

On 30 September 2024, Jusufbegović was appointed manager of Sloga Doboj. His debut was a 2–1 away loss to Radnik Bijeljina on 20 October 2024. After stirring Sloga to an unexpected top-half finish and avoiding relegation early on in the season, Jusufbegović decided to leave the club by mutual consent in May 2025. On 20 February 2026, he returned to manage Sloga amidst a relegation battle. He successfully led the club to safety from relegation after beating Rudar Prijedor 1–0 in the final game of the season on 26 May, a result which subsequently ensured the relegation of Posušje. Jusufbegović left Sloga following the end of the season.

== Managerial statistics ==
As of match played 26 May 2026

Managerial record by team and tenure
Team	From	To	Record				
Team	From	To	G	W	D	L	Win %
Olimpik	15 August 2011	19 September 2012	35	18	9	8	51.43
Olimpik	11 April 2013	3 October 2013	20	9	7	4	45.00
Velež Mostar	3 October 2013	18 March 2015	43	21	13	9	48.84
Zvijezda Gradačac	19 April 2015	15 May 2016	34	18	7	9	52.94
GOŠK Gabela	1 July 2016	18 September 2016	7	3	1	3	42.86
Čelik Zenica	2 November 2016	19 March 2017	8	1	4	3	12.50
Igman Konjic	6 April 2018	10 May 2019	36	13	8	15	36.11
Bosnia and Herzegovina U17	29 August 2022	30 November 2022	5	4	1	0	80.00
Velež Mostar	1 December 2022	23 August 2023	24	12	5	7	50.00
Sloga Doboj	30 September 2024	9 May 2025	23	11	2	10	47.83
Sloga Doboj	20 February 2026	30 June 2026	18	5	4	9	27.78
Total			253	115	61	77	45.45

== Honours ==
=== Player ===
Sarajevo

- Bosnian First League: 1998–99

Olimpija Ljubljana

- Slovenian Cup: 2002–03

=== Manager ===
Velež Mostar

- Bosnian Cup runner-up: 2022–23
