= Marko Maksimović (footballer) =

Bosnian football manager (born 1984)

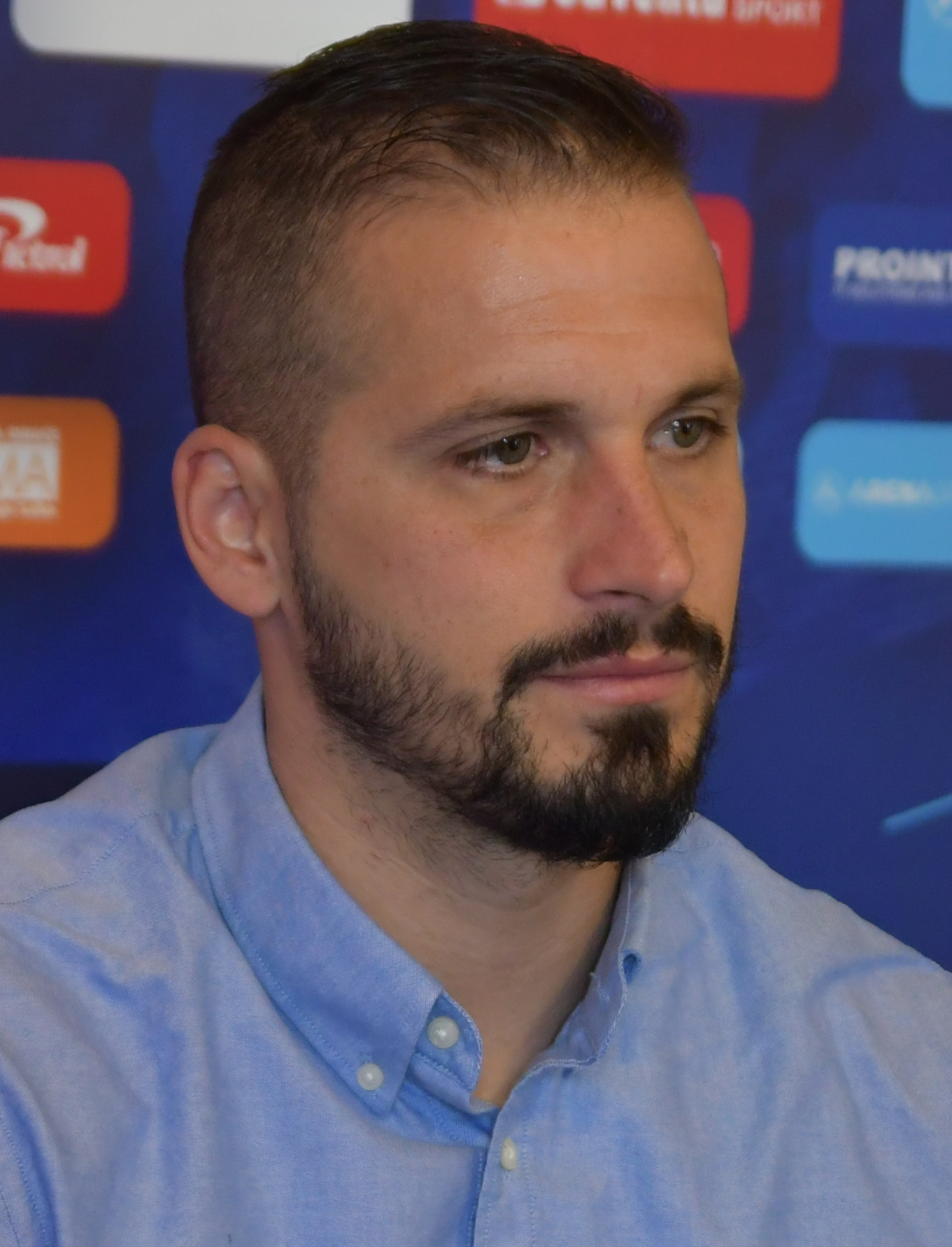
- Maksimović with Borac Banja Luka in 2021

Personal information
- Date of birth: 15 January 1984 (age 42)
- Place of birth: Banja Luka, SFR Yugoslavia
- Height: 1.84 m (6 ft 0 in)
- Position: Midfielder

Youth career
- Džaja Football School

Senior career*
Years	Team	Apps	(Gls)
2003–2004	Borac Banja Luka	39	(6)
2005	NK Zagreb	2	(0)
2005–2007	Istra 1961	48	(1)
2007–2008	Sarajevo	31	(2)
2008	Leotar	4	(1)
2009–2012	Borac Banja Luka	33	(6)
Total		157	(16)

International career
- Bosnia and Herzegovina U21

Managerial career
- 2015–2017: BSK Banja Luka
- 2018: Borac Banja Luka (caretaker)
- 2020–2021: Borac Banja Luka
- 2022–2023: Leotar
- 2024: Sloboda Tuzla
- 2025: Posušje
- 2025–2026: Sloga Doboj
- * Club domestic league appearances and goals

Marko Maksimović (Serbian Cyrillic: Марко Максимовић; born 20 August 1984) is a Bosnian professional football manager and former player.

== Club career ==
Maksimović played youth football in the Džaja football school in his hometown of Banja Luka. His professional career started at another Banja Luka club - FK Borac. He is considered to have been a very creative and hard-working midfielder which secured him a place in the Bosnia and Herzegovina U21 national team.

He played for NK Zagreb and Istra 1961 in the Croatian Prva HNL.

Maksimović signed with Sarajevo in July 2007. He scored his first goal for the team against Marsaxlokk in the UEFA Champions League qualifiers on 18 July 2007. Afterwards, he played six months with Leotar before returning to Borac in January 2009, and retiring there three years later in 2012.

== International career ==
Maksimović was a member of the Bosnia and Herzegovina U21 national team.

== Managerial career ==
Maksimović started off his managerial career at BSK Banja Luka in 2015, staying there until 2017. He was then caretaker manager of Borac Banja Luka for one game in March 2018.

On 26 December 2020, Maksimović came back to Borac, this time as a permanent manager, replacing Vlado Jagodić. In his first game as manager, Borac beat Olimpik in a league match on 27 February 2021. Maksimović oversaw his first loss as manager in a league game against Velež Mostar, played on 5 March 2021. In the end however, he managed to guide Borac to a Bosnian Premier League title one game before the end of the 2020–21 season, their first after 10 years. Maksimović also almost guided the club to a 2020–21 Bosnian Cup victory, but lost to Sarajevo in the final. He resigned as Borac's manager on 28 July 2021 after a poor start to the 2021–22 season.

On 16 September 2022, Maksimović was appointed the new manager of Leotar. His first match saw Leotar draw against Sloboda Tuzla on 18 September. On 8 October 2022, he recorded his first win as the club's manager, beating Sloga Doboj 4–1 in a league game. Leotar finished in 11th place in the Bosnian Premier League and were relegated to the First League of RS. On 10 July 2023, Maksimović left the club by mutual consent.

On 26 July 2024, Sloboda Tuzla announced Maksimović as the club's new manager. In his first game in charge, Sloboda lost to Sarajevo 3–1 away on 4 August 2024. With Sloboda sitting in the relegation zone with two points from their previous eight games, Maksimović was sacked as manager on 28 September 2024.

On 13 March 2025, Maksimović became manager of Posušje, replacing Branko Karačić. His first game in charge was a 1–1 home draw against Velež on 16 March. He earned his first victory on 17 April 2025, defeating Velež 2–0 at home. Posušje managed to avoid relegation in the 2024–25 season. Maksimović resigned as manager on 29 September 2025, with Posušje bottom with five points from their first nine league games in the 2025–26 season.

A week after leaving Posušje, Maksimović was appointed manager of Sloga Doboj on 7 October. He debuted in a 1–0 away defeat to Zrinjski Mostar on 18 October. On 29 October, Maksimović secured his first win as Sloga manager, defeating third tier side Grude 7–0 away in the Bosnian Cup first round. Following a series of poor results, he left Sloga by mutual consent on 16 February 2026.

== Managerial statistics ==
As of match played 15 February 2026

Managerial record by team and tenure
Team	From	To	Record							
Team	From	To	G	W	D	L	GF	GA	GD	Win %
Borac Banja Luka (caretaker)	13 March 2018	22 March 2018	1	0	0	1	0	2	−2	0.00
Borac Banja Luka	26 December 2020	28 July 2021	23	15	4	4	35	18	+17	65.22
Leotar	16 September 2022	10 July 2023	25	8	6	11	27	28	−1	32.00
Sloboda Tuzla	26 July 2024	28 September 2024	8	0	2	6	3	13	−10	0.00
Posušje	13 March 2025	29 September 2025	21	5	5	11	18	24	−6	23.81
Sloga Doboj	7 October 2025	16 February 2026	13	3	4	6	18	12	+6	23.08
Total			91	31	21	39	101	97	+4	34.07

== Honours ==
=== Player ===
Borac Banja Luka

- Bosnian Premier League: 2010–11
- Bosnian Cup: 2009–10

=== Manager ===
Borac Banja Luka

- Bosnian Premier League: 2020–21
- Bosnian Cup runner-up: 2020–21
