= Damir Džidić =

Croatian footballer (born 1987)

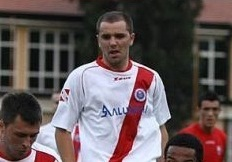
- Džidić with Zrinjski Mostar in 2010

Personal information
- Date of birth: 15 February 1987 (age 39)
- Place of birth: Mostar, SFR Yugoslavia
- Height: 1.82 m (6 ft 0 in)
- Position: Centre-back

Youth career
- Zrinjski Mostar
- –2006: Dinamo Zagreb

Senior career*
| Years | Team | Apps | (Gls) |
| 2006–2007 | Zrinjski Mostar | 37 | (2) |
| 2008 | Zagreb | 9 | (0) |
| 2009–2012 | Zrinjski Mostar | 46 | (7) |
| 2012–2015 | Široki Brijeg | 26 | (2) |
| Total | | 118 | (11) |

International career
| 2004 | Croatia U18 | 2 | (0) |
| 2005–2006 | Croatia U19 | 10 | (1) |
| 2007 | Croatia U21 | 4 | (0) |
- * Club domestic league appearances and goals

Damir Džidić (born 15 February 1987) is a Croatian former professional footballer who played as a centre-back. He is the younger brother of Ivica Džidić.

== Honours ==
Zrinjski Mostar

- Bosnian Premier League: 2008–09

Široki Brijeg

- Bosnian Cup: 2012–13
