= 2020–21 Premier League of Bosnia and Herzegovina =

Premijer liga
- Season: 2020–21
- Dates: 1 August 2020 – 30 May 2021
- Champions: Borac; 2nd Premier League title 2nd Bosnian title
- Relegated: Mladost Doboj Kakanj; Krupa; Olimpik
- Champions League: Borac
- Europa Conference League: Sarajevo; Velež; Široki Brijeg
- Matches: 198
- Goals: 476 (2.4 per match)
- Top goalscorer: Nemanja Bilbija (17 goals)
- Biggest home win: Borac 6–0 Mladost Doboj Kakanj (1 August 2020)
- Biggest away win: Mladost Doboj Kakanj 2–5 Tuzla City (15 August 2020)
- Highest scoring: Željezničar 4–4 Mladost Doboj Kakanj (10 April 2021)
- Longest winning run: Sarajevo (8 matches)
- Longest unbeaten run: Sarajevo; Velež (20 matches)
- Longest winless run: Željezničar (15 matches)
- Longest losing run: Sloboda; Krupa; Olimpik (5 matches)
- Highest attendance: 5,000; Borac 2–0 Tuzla City (23 May 2021)
- Lowest attendance: 350; Radnik 0–2 Široki Brijeg (30 May 2021)
- Total attendance: 6,350
- Average attendance: 2,117 (excluding matches played behind closed doors)

The 2020–21 Premier League of Bosnia and Herzegovina (known as m:tel Premier League for sponsorship reasons) was the 21st season of the Premier League of Bosnia and Herzegovina, the highest football league of Bosnia and Herzegovina. The season began on 1 August 2020 and ended on 30 May 2021, with a winter break between mid-December 2020 and late February 2021.

There was no attendance from fans in the stadiums besides each team's staff and personnel due to the COVID-19 pandemic in Bosnia and Herzegovina.

== Teams ==
A total of 12 teams contested in the league, including 10 sides from the 2019–20 season and two promoted from each of the second-level leagues, Krupa and Olimpik, replacing relegated sides, Čelik and Zvijezda 09.

=== Stadiums and locations ===
Locations of the 2020–21 Premier League of BiH clubs
Location of teams in Sarajevo

Note: Table lists in alphabetical order.

Team	Location	Stadium	Capacity
Borac	Banja Luka	Banja Luka City Stadium	10,030
Krupa	Krupa na Vrbasu	Gradski Stadion	3,500
Mladost Doboj Kakanj	Doboj, Kakanj	MGM Farm Arena	3,000
Olimpik	Sarajevo (Otoka)	Otoka	3,000
Radnik	Bijeljina	Bijeljina City Stadium	6,000
Sarajevo	Sarajevo (Koševo)	Asim Ferhatović Hase	30,121
Sloboda	Tuzla	Tušanj	7,200
Široki Brijeg	Široki Brijeg	Pecara	5,147
Tuzla City	Tuzla	Tušanj	7,200
Velež	Mostar (Vrapčići)	Stadion Rođeni	7,000
Zrinjski	Mostar	Stadion pod Bijelim Brijegom	9,000
Željezničar	Sarajevo (Grbavica)	Grbavica	13,146

=== Personnel and kits ===
Note: Flags indicate national team as has been defined under FIFA eligibility rules. Players and Managers may hold more than one non-FIFA nationality.

Team	Head coach	Captain	Kit manufacturer	Shirt sponsor
Borac	(Bosnia and Herzegovina) Marko Maksimović	(Bosnia and Herzegovina) Stojan Vranješ	Kelme	Mtel
Krupa	(Bosnia and Herzegovina) Vladimir Ilić	(Bosnia and Herzegovina) Nikola Dujaković	No1	WWin
Mladost Doboj Kakanj	(Sweden) Nemanja Miljanović	(Bosnia and Herzegovina) Amer Hiroš	Legea	HeidelbergCement
Olimpik	(Serbia) Slavko Petrović	(Bosnia and Herzegovina) Adnan Osmanović	GBT	—
Radnik	(Bosnia and Herzegovina) Vlado Jagodić	(Bosnia and Herzegovina) Velibor Đurić	Givova	WWin
Sarajevo	(Bosnia and Herzegovina) Dženan Uščuplić (caretaker)	(North Macedonia) Krste Velkoski	Nike	Turkish Airlines
Sloboda	(Bosnia and Herzegovina) Mladen Žižović	(Bosnia and Herzegovina) Amar Beganović	Legea	WWin
Široki Brijeg	(Bosnia and Herzegovina) Toni Karačić	(Croatia) Božo Musa	Kelme	WWin
Tuzla City	(Bosnia and Herzegovina) Husref Musemić	(Serbia) Ivan Kostić	No1	—
Velež	(Bosnia and Herzegovina) Feđa Dudić	(Bosnia and Herzegovina) Denis Zvonić	No1	Bosnalijek
Zrinjski	(Bosnia and Herzegovina) Sergej Jakirović	(Bosnia and Herzegovina) Nemanja Bilbija	Macron	PPD
Željezničar	(Bosnia and Herzegovina) Blaž Slišković	(Bosnia and Herzegovina) Semir Štilić	Macron	—

== League table ==
Pos	Team	Pld	W	D	L	GF	GA	GD	Pts	Qualification or relegation
1	Borac Banja Luka (C)	33	21	4	8	59	31	+28	67	Qualification for the Champions League first qualifying round
2	Sarajevo	33	18	11	4	53	24	+29	65	Qualification to Europa Conference League first qualifying round
3	Velež Mostar	33	16	13	4	50	30	+20	61	Qualification to Europa Conference League first qualifying round
4	Široki Brijeg	33	17	8	8	47	30	+17	59 (Note: Since fourth place decided UEFA Europa Conference League qualification, goal difference and goals scored were not used to rank teams. Head-to-head points: Široki Brijeg 6, Zrinjski Mostar 3.)	Qualification to Europa Conference League first qualifying round
5	Zrinjski Mostar	33	18	5	10	50	30	+20	59	
6	Tuzla City	33	13	9	11	36	35	+1	48	
7	Željezničar	33	12	8	13	50	43	+7	44	
8	Sloboda Tuzla	33	10	7	16	31	41	−10	37	
9	Mladost Doboj Kakanj (Note: Mladost Doboj Kakanj initially avoided relegation to the Prva Liga FBiH, but were then relegated to the league due to failing to obtain a license for the Premier League.) (R)	33	8	6	19	26	57	−31	30	Relegation to the Prva Liga FBiH
10	Krupa (Note: Krupa initially avoided relegation to the Prva Liga RS, but were then relegated to the league due to failing to obtain a license for the Premier League.) (R)	33	7	7	19	26	46	−20	28	Relegation to the Prva Liga RS
11	Radnik Bijeljina	33	5	10	18	26	51	−25	25	
12	Olimpik (R)	33	7	4	22	22	58	−36	25	Relegation to the Prva Liga FBiH

Source: Rezultati.com
Rules for classification: 1) Points; 2) Goal difference; 3) Goals scored; 4) Head-to-head points; 5) Head-to-head goal difference; 6) Head-to-head away goals (only if two teams); 7) Head-to-head goals scored; 8) Goal difference; 9) Play-off. (Criteria 2 and 3 are not used to decide champion, UEFA competition qualification, or relegation)
(C) Champions; (R) Relegated

== Results ==
=== Rounds 1–22 ===
Home \ Away	BOR	KRU	MDK	OLI	RAD	SAR	SLO	ŠB	TUZ	VEL	ZRI	ŽEL
Borac	—	3–1	6–0	2–0	2–0	2–2	2–0	1–1	2–0	2–0	1–0	4–3
Krupa	1–3	—	0–1	1–0	1–1	0–2	2–3	1–1	0–1	1–1	0–3	2–1
Mladost Doboj Kakanj	0–2	1–0	—	1–0	3–2	2–2	2–0	0–1	2–5	1–2	0–1	0–4
Olimpik	1–4	1–1	0–2	—	1–0	1–3	2–0	1–2	3–2	2–1	3–0	0–3
Radnik	1–0	1–1	3–1	4–0	—	0–2	1–1	1–1	2–1	0–0	0–2	0–2
Sarajevo	4–2	3–0	5–1	2–0	2–1	—	2–1	2–0	1–0	1–1	0–1	1–1
Sloboda	1–0	2–0	3–0	2–0	1–1	2–3	—	3–0	0–2	1–2	0–0	0–2
Široki Brijeg	3–0	1–0	2–1	1–0	5–0	1–0	3–0	—	1–0	2–2	2–1	0–1
Tuzla City	2–0	1–0	1–0	3–2	1–0	0–0	2–1	1–1	—	1–3	0–4	2–0
Velež	2–0	2–0	4–0	2–0	2–1	0–0	3–0	2–1	1–1	—	2–0	1–1
Zrinjski	2–1	1–0	2–0	1–0	0–0	2–3	1–0	2–1	1–2	3–1	—	1–2
Željezničar	2–1	0–1	0–1	0–1	3–1	0–0	2–2	2–3	1–0	3–0	1–0	—

Source: Football Association of Bosnia and Herzegovina
Legend: Blue = home team win; Yellow = draw; Red = away team win.
For upcoming matches, an "a" indicates there is an article about the rivalry between the two participants.

=== Rounds 23–33 ===
Home \ Away	BOR	KRU	MDK	OLI	RAD	SAR	SLO	ŠB	TUZ	VEL	ZRI	ŽEL
Borac		1–0	1–0	3–0				2–1	2–0		2–1	
Krupa			3–0	3–0 (Note: Krupa was given a 3–0 win by default in Round 32 since the match was postponed because of Olimpik's withdrawal from the Premier League.)	1–0		1–0		1–1			
Mladost Doboj Kakanj					0–0	0–0			2–0	0–1	1–1	
Olimpik			0–0			0–3 (Note: Sarajevo was given a 3–0 win by default in Round 33 since the match was postponed because of Olimpik's withdrawal from the Premier League.)			1–1	1–1	0–3	
Radnik	1–3			1–0			1–2	0–2				1–1
Sarajevo	0–2	1–0			3–0		0–0	1–0				3–1
Sloboda	0–0		1–0	2–0				1–1				1–0
Široki Brijeg		2–2	1–0	3–0					0–0	0–2	1–0	
Tuzla City					2–0	1–1	1–0			1–1	1–2	
Velež	1–1	2–1			2–2	1–0	2–0					2–2
Zrinjski		3–1			3–0	1–1	3–1			1–1		4–2
Željezničar	1–2	3–0	4–4	1–2				1–3	0–0			

Source: Football Association of Bosnia and Herzegovina
Legend: Blue = home team win; Yellow = draw; Red = away team win.
For upcoming matches, an "a" indicates there is an article about the rivalry between the two participants.

== Top goalscorers ==
Rank	Player	Club	Goals
1	(Bosnia and Herzegovina) Nemanja Bilbija	Zrinjski	17
2	(Bosnia and Herzegovina) Stojan Vranješ	Borac	15
3	(Bosnia and Herzegovina) Goran Zakarić	Borac	12
4	(Bosnia and Herzegovina) Obren Cvijanović	Velež	11
5	(England) Matthias Fanimo	Sarajevo	10
5	(Bosnia and Herzegovina) Benjamin Tatar	Sarajevo	10
7	(Bosnia and Herzegovina) Nedim Hadžić	Mladost Doboj Kakanj	9
7	(Bosnia and Herzegovina) Stipe Jurić	Široki Brijeg	9
7	(Serbia) Fejsal Mulić	Velež	9
10	(Bosnia and Herzegovina) Luka Juričić	Željezničar	8
10	(Bosnia and Herzegovina) Jovo Lukić	Borac	8
10	(Bosnia and Herzegovina) Semir Štilić	Željezničar	8
