= Nemanja Bilbija =

Bosnian footballer (born 1990)

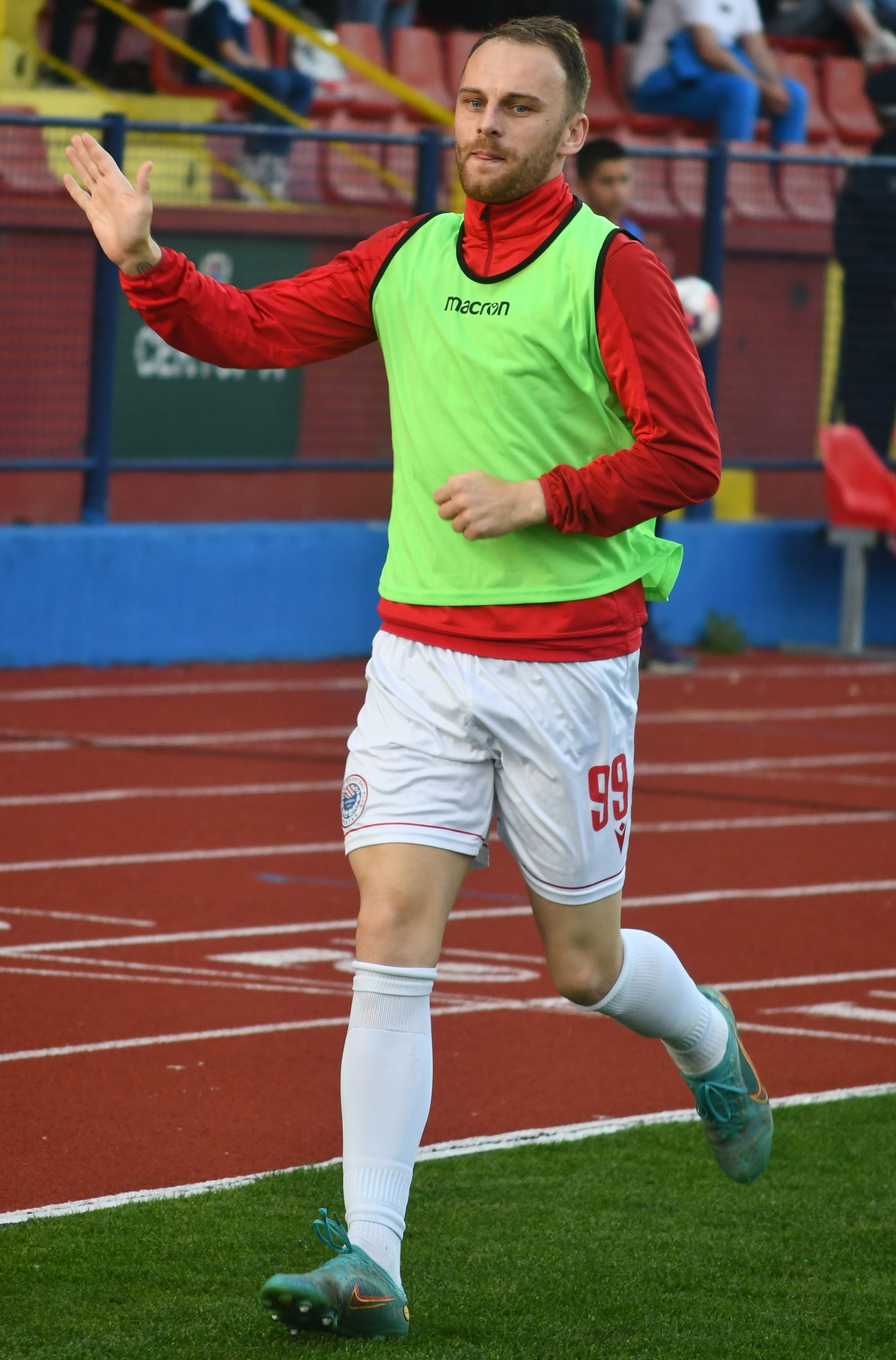
- Bilbija with Zrinjski Mostar in 2024

Personal information
- Date of birth: 2 November 1990 (age 36)
- Place of birth: Banja Luka, SR Bosnia and Herzegovina, Yugoslavia
- Height: 1.81 m (5 ft 11 in)
- Position: Forward

Team information
- Current team: Zrinjski Mostar
- Number: 99

Youth career
- 2000–2008: Borac Banja Luka

Senior career*
Years	Team	Apps	(Gls)
2008–2010	Borac Banja Luka	30	(11)
2010–2013	Vojvodina	43	(2)
2012–2013	→ Borac Banja Luka (loan)	23	(14)
2013–2015	Sarajevo	30	(6)
2015–2016	Split	9	(0)
2016–2018	Zrinjski Mostar	86	(40)
2019	Gangwon	6	(2)
2019–	Zrinjski Mostar	185	(134)

International career
2009–2012	Bosnia and Herzegovina U21	22	(9)
2018–2023	Bosnia and Herzegovina	6	(0)
- * Club domestic league appearances and goals as of 21 November 2026

Nemanja Bilbija (Serbian Cyrillic: Немања Билбија, pronounced [němaɲa bîlbija]; born 2 November 1990) is a Bosnian professional footballer who plays as a forward for Bosnian Premier League club Zrinjski Mostar.

A former youth international for Bosnia and Herzegovina, Bilbija made his senior international debut in 2018, earning 6 caps until 2023. He is the Bosnian Premier League's record goalscorer.

== Club career ==
=== Early career ===
Bilbija started his career with his hometown club Borac Banja Luka, whose academy he joined in 2000. He made his professional debut on 8 November 2008 against Posušje at the age of 18. He scored his first goal as a professional against Orašje on 7 March 2009.

On 29 January 2010 Bilbija moved to Serbian side Vojvodina signing a four-year contract. During his time at the club, he was sent on two loans to his former club, Borac Banja Luka.

In August 2013, Bilbija signed a two-year deal with Sarajevo.

In July 2015, he joined Split on a two-year contract.

=== Zrinjski Mostar ===
On 11 February 2016, Bilbija signed with Zrinjski Mostar on free transfer. He scored on his competitive debut for the club against his former team Sarajevo on 28 February.

In August 2017, Bilbija signed a new two-year deal with Zrinjski Mostar. In a game against Vitez on 26 August, Bilbija scored his first hat-trick for the team. A year later, he scored four goals in a convincing triumph over Zvijezda 09.

On 10 November 2018, Bilbija scored a brace on his 100th appearance for the club.

=== Gangwon ===
On 23 December 2018, Bilbija joined South Korean side Gangwon for an undisclosed transfer fee. On 4 January 2019, Bilbija officially joined Gangwon after signing a contract with the club.

He made his debut for Gangwon on 2 March 2019, in a 2–0 away loss against Sangju Sangmu coming in as a substitute in the 71st minute.

Bilbija scored his first goal for Gangwon on 15 May 2019, in a 2–0 home win against Paju Citizen in the round of 16 of the 2019 Korean FA Cup.

=== Return to Zrinjski Mostar ===
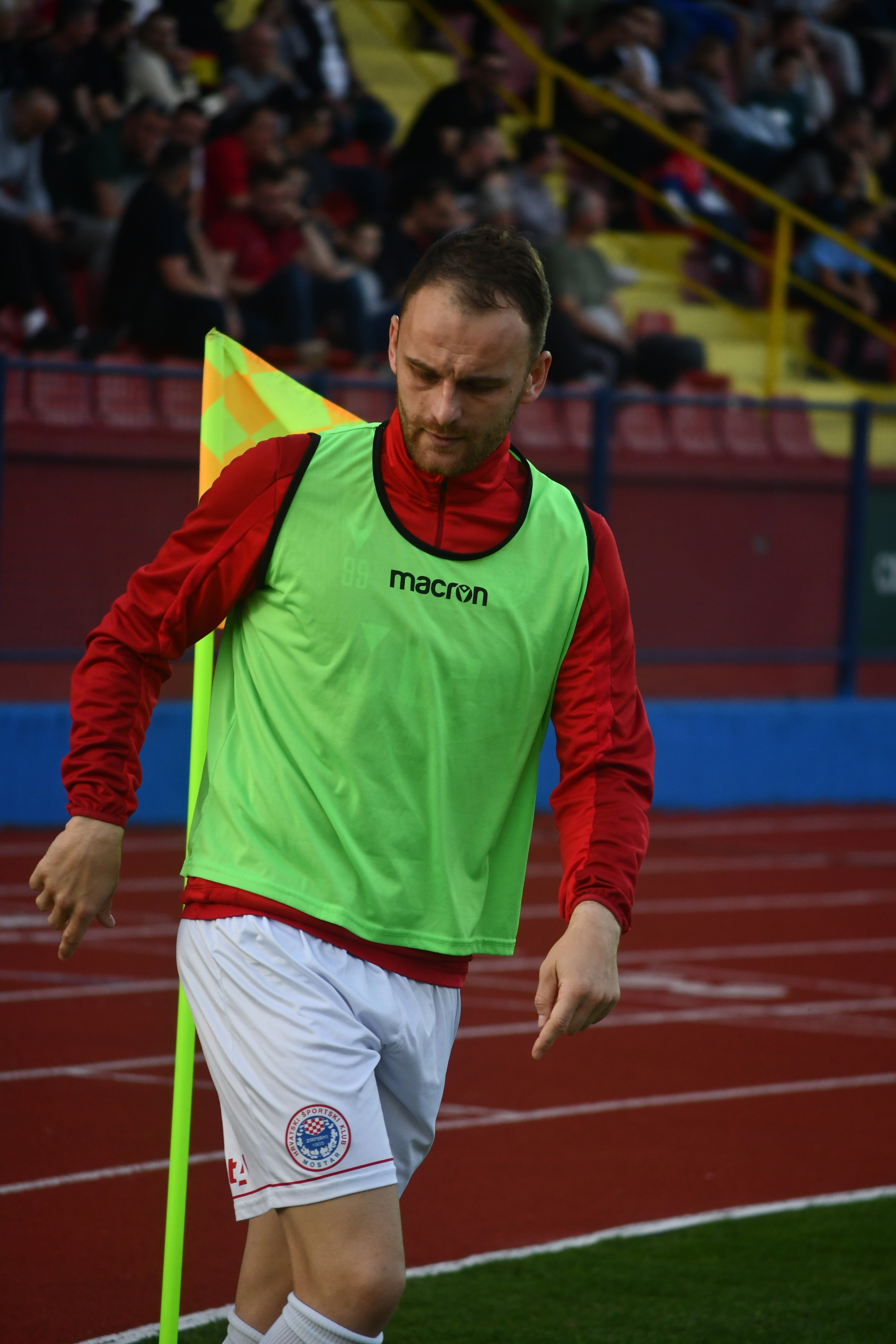
Bilbija warming up for Zrinjski in 2024

On 24 December 2019, Bilbija came back to Zrinjski almost a year after joining Gangwon, signing a three-and-a-half-year contract which will last until the summer of 2023 with the Mostar based club. In his first game back, Bilbija scored a goal in a 2–0 league win against Čelik Zenica on 23 February 2020.

On 31 October 2020, he scored a hat-trick against Velež in the Mostar derby.

Bilbija finished the 2020–21 season as the league's top goalscorer with 17 goals.

In a league game against Sarajevo on 23 October 2021, Bilbija scored his 76th goal for Zrinjski, making him the club's highest goalscorer of all time. Following a 4–0 over Sarajevo on 16 April 2022, the club was crowned league champions, with Bilbija winning his fourth league title with Zrinjski. He finished the 2021–22 season again as the league's top goalscorer with a record-breaking 33 goals.

On 4 September 2022, Bilbija scored two goals in a 4–1 league win against Sarajevo, overtaking Wagner as the Bosnian Premier League's record goalscorer. He finished the 2022–23 season as the league's top goalscorer for a third time in a row, as well as winning the double with Zrinjski, the first in the club's history.

In the first leg of the Bosnian Cup final in May 2024, Bilbija suffered a severe knee injury after tearing his ligament, ruling him out for five months. His first game back since his injury was a 2–0 win over Radnik Bijeljina on 16 October 2024. On 27 September 2025, Bilbija made his 300th appearance for Zrinjski in a 3–1 away win in the Mostar derby over rivals Velež. He scored his 200th goal for the club in a 3–1 home win against BSK Banja Luka on 1 September 2026. On 19 September 2026, he scored his record 200th Bosnian Premier League goal in a 2–0 home win against Velež.

== International career ==
Bilbija was a member of the Bosnia and Herzegovina national under-21 team. He was also captain of the under-21 side and is the highest goalscorer in the team's history with 9 goals.

In August 2017, Bilbija received his first senior call-up, for 2018 FIFA World Cup qualifiers against Cyprus and Gibraltar. He debuted in a friendly game against United States on 28 January 2018.

== Personal life ==
Bilbija's father Milorad Bilbija was also a professional footballer who currently works as a football manager.

== Career statistics ==
=== Club ===
As of match played 21 November 2026

Club	Season	League			National cup (Note: Includes Bosnian Cup, Serbian Cup, Korea Cup)		Continental		Other		Total	
Club	Season	Division	Apps	Goals	Apps	Goals	Apps	Goals	Apps	Goals	Apps	Goals
Borac Banja Luka	2008–09	Bosnian Premier League	17	5	0	0	–		–		17	5
Borac Banja Luka	2009–10	Bosnian Premier League	13	6	3	1	–		–		16	8
Borac Banja Luka	Total		30	11	3	1	–		–		33	12
Vojvodina	2009–10	Serbian SuperLiga	10	1	0	0	–		–		10	1
Vojvodina	2010–11	Serbian SuperLiga	18	1	3	0	–		–		21	1
Vojvodina	2011–12	Serbian SuperLiga	5	0	0	0	0	0	–		5	0
Vojvodina	2012–13	Serbian SuperLiga	9	0	2	0	3 (Note: Appearances in UEFA Europa League)	0	–		14	0
Vojvodina	2013–14	Serbian SuperLiga	1	0	0	0	4	1	–		5	1
Vojvodina	Total		43	2	5	0	7	1	–		55	3
Borac Banja Luka (loan)	2011–12	Bosnian Premier League	11	6	1	0	–		–		12	6
Borac Banja Luka (loan)	2012–13	Bosnian Premier League	12	8	–		–		–		12	8
Borac Banja Luka (loan)	Total		23	14	1	0	–		–		24	14
Sarajevo	2013–14	Bosnian Premier League	10	2	6	2	–		–		16	4
Sarajevo	2014–15	Bosnian Premier League	20	4	1	0	6	2	–		27	6
Sarajevo	Total		30	6	7	2	6	2	–		43	10
Split	2015–16	1. HNL	9	0	–		–		–		9	0
Zrinjski Mostar	2015–16	Bosnian Premier League	9	4	–		–		–		9	4
Zrinjski Mostar	2016–17	Bosnian Premier League	31	10	3	2	2 (Note: Appearances in UEFA Champions League)	0	–		36	12
Zrinjski Mostar	2017–18	Bosnian Premier League	30	12	0	0	2	0	–		32	12
Zrinjski Mostar	2018–19	Bosnian Premier League	16	14	1	0	6 (Note: Two appearances in UEFA Champions League; four appearances and two goals in UEFA Europa League)	2	–		23	16
Zrinjski Mostar	Total		86	40	4	2	10	2	–		100	44
Gangwon	2019	K League 1	6	2	2	1	–		–		8	3
Zrinjski Mostar	2019–20	Bosnian Premier League	3	2	0	0	–		–		3	2
Zrinjski Mostar	2020–21	Bosnian Premier League	28	17	1	0	3	4	–		32	21
Zrinjski Mostar	2021–22	Bosnian Premier League	32	33	1	1	–		–		33	34
Zrinjski Mostar	2022–23	Bosnian Premier League	30	24	4	5	8 (Note: Two appearances in UEFA Champions League; six appearances and two goals in UEFA Europa Conference League)	2	–		42	31
Zrinjski Mostar	2023–24	Bosnian Premier League	29	24	4	0	14 (Note: Four appearances and one goal in UEFA Champions League; four appearances and three goals in UEFA Europa League; six appearances and one goal in UEFA Europa Conference League)	5	–		47	29
Zrinjski Mostar	2024–25	Bosnian Premier League	22	10	4	1	0	0	1 (Note: Appearance in Bosnian Supercup)	1	27	12
Zrinjski Mostar	2025–26	Bosnian Premier League	27	13	3	2	13 (Note: Four appearances and four goals in UEFA Champions League; four appearances and two goals in UEFA Europa League; five appearances and two goals in UEFA Conference League)	8	1	0	44	23
Zrinjski Mostar	2026–27	Bosnian Premier League	14	11	0	0	2 (Note: Appearances in UEFA Conference League)	1	0	0	16	12
Zrinjski Mostar	Total		185	134	17	9	40	20	2	1	244	164
Career total			412	209	39	15	63	25	2	1	516	250

=== International ===
As of match played 19 November 2023.

National team	Year	Apps	Goals
Bosnia and Herzegovina
Bosnia and Herzegovina	2018	1	0
Bosnia and Herzegovina	2023	5	0
Total		6	0

== Honours ==
Sarajevo

- Bosnian Premier League: 2014–15
- Bosnian Cup: 2013–14

Zrinjski Mostar

- Bosnian Premier League: 2015–16, 2016–17, 2017–18, 2021–22, 2022–23, 2024–25
- Bosnian Cup: 2022–23, 2023–24, 2025–26
- Bosnian Supercup: 2024, 2025

Individual

- Bosnian Premier League Player of the Season: 2021–22, 2022–23, 2023–24
- Bosnian Premier League top scorer: 2020–21, 2021–22, 2022–23, 2023–24
