= 2025–26 Premier League of Bosnia and Herzegovina =

Premijer liga
- Season: 2025–26
- Dates: 26 July 2025 – 26 May 2026
- Champions: Borac; 4th Premier League title 4th Bosnian title
- Relegated: Posušje; Rudar
- Champions League: Borac
- Conference League: Zrinjski; Sarajevo; Velež
- Matches: 180
- Goals: 389 (2.16 per match)
- Top goalscorer: Luka Juričić (27 goals)
- Biggest home win: Borac 6–0 Rudar (27 July 2025)
- Biggest away win: Sloga 0–4 Borac (20 February 2026)
- Highest scoring: Sarajevo 4–4 Radnik (3 August 2025)
- Longest winning run: Borac (8 matches)
- Longest unbeaten run: Borac (16 matches)
- Longest winless run: Željezničar (12 matches)
- Longest losing run: Sloga (5 matches)
- Highest attendance: 11,300; Željezničar 3–2 Borac (15 September 2025)
- Lowest attendance: 50; Sloga 0–0 Radnik (16 May 2026)
- Total attendance: 452,223
- Average attendance: 2,512

The 2025–26 Premier League of Bosnia and Herzegovina (known as the Wwin League for sponsorship reasons) was the 26th season of the Premier League of Bosnia and Herzegovina, the highest football league of Bosnia and Herzegovina. The season began on 26 July 2025 and ended on 26 May 2026, with a winter break between mid December 2025 and early February 2026.

This was the first season played with 10 teams, as the number of clubs was reduced from 12 starting with the 2025–26 season. During the season, every team played each other four times, both home and away twice, for a total of 36 matches per team.

Zrinjski Mostar were the defending champions, but were dethroned by Borac Banja Luka with four games to spare.

== Teams ==
Ten teams contested in the league – the top nine teams from the previous season and one promoted from one of the second-level leagues. The promoted team was Rudar Prijedor, while Stupčanica failed to obtain a license to compete in the Premier League. The relegated teams from the previous season were Igman Konjic, GOŠK Gabela and Sloboda Tuzla.

=== Stadiums and locations ===
Locations of the 2025–26 Premier League of BiH clubs

Note: Table lists in alphabetical order.

Team	Location	Stadium	Capacity
Borac	Banja Luka	Banja Luka City Stadium	10,030
Posušje	Posušje	Mokri Dolac	5,040
Radnik	Bijeljina	Bijeljina City Stadium	6,000
Rudar	Prijedor	Gradski stadion	3,540
Sarajevo	Sarajevo (Koševo)	Asim Ferhatović Hase	34,700
Sloga	Doboj	Luke Stadium	3,000
Široki Brijeg	Široki Brijeg	Pecara	5,147
Velež	Mostar (Vrapčići)	Stadion Rođeni	7,000
Zrinjski	Mostar	Stadion pod Bijelim Brijegom	9,000
Željezničar	Sarajevo (Grbavica)	Grbavica	13,057

=== Personnel and kits ===
Note: Flags indicate national team as has been defined under FIFA eligibility rules. Players and Managers may hold more than one non-FIFA nationality.

Team	Manager	Captain	Kit manufacturer	Shirt sponsor
Borac	(Bosnia and Herzegovina) Vinko Marinović	(Bosnia and Herzegovina) Srđan Grahovac	Kelme	Mtel
Posušje	(Croatia) Dario Bašić	(Bosnia and Herzegovina) Zvonimir Begić	Macron	Formula
Radnik	(Bosnia and Herzegovina) Duško Vranešević	(Bosnia and Herzegovina) Slaviša Radović	Kelme	SoccerBet
Rudar	(Serbia) Perica Ognjenović	(Bosnia and Herzegovina) Nemanja Pekija	Kelme	ArcelorMittal
Sarajevo	(Croatia) Mario Cvitanović	(Serbia) Adem Ljajić	Adidas	Turkish Airlines
Sloga	(Bosnia and Herzegovina) Nedim Jusufbegović	(Serbia) Milan Milanović	Macron	Meridian
Široki Brijeg	(Croatia) Damir Milanović	(Bosnia and Herzegovina) Božo Musa	Kelme	WWin
Velež	(Bosnia and Herzegovina) Ibrahim Rahimić	(Bosnia and Herzegovina) Edo Vehabović	Puma	Narentas
Zrinjski	(Croatia) Igor Štimac	(Bosnia and Herzegovina) Nemanja Bilbija	Macron	M.T. Abraham Group
Željezničar	(Bosnia and Herzegovina) Adin Mulaosmanović (caretaker)	(Bosnia and Herzegovina) Madžid Šošić	Macron	WWin

=== Managerial changes ===
Team	Outgoing manager	Manner of departure	Date of vacancy	Position in the table	Incoming manager	Date of appointment
Željezničar	(Bosnia and Herzegovina) Omer Joldić	End of interim spell	10 June 2025	Pre-season	(Bosnia and Herzegovina) Admir Adžem	10 June 2025
Velež	(Serbia) Vladimir Janković	Mutual consent	11 June 2025	Pre-season	(Croatia) Goran Sablić	12 June 2025
Rudar	(Bosnia and Herzegovina) Goran Kecman	Mutual consent	18 June 2025	Pre-season	(Serbia) Perica Ognjenović	18 June 2025
Borac	(Bosnia and Herzegovina) Mladen Žižović	Resigned	18 July 2025	Pre-season	(Bosnia and Herzegovina) Vinko Marinović	21 July 2025
Zrinjski	(Croatia) Mario Ivanković	Mutual consent	31 July 2025	8th	(Croatia) Igor Štimac	1 August 2025
Sarajevo	(Croatia) Zoran Zekić	Resigned	5 August 2025	6th	(Bosnia and Herzegovina) Husref Musemić	10 August 2025
Velež	(Croatia) Goran Sablić	Resigned	28 September 2025	8th	(Bosnia and Herzegovina) Ibrahim Rahimić	1 October 2025
Sarajevo	(Bosnia and Herzegovina) Husref Musemić	Mutual consent	29 September 2025	7th	(Croatia) Mario Cvitanović	30 September 2025
Posušje	(Bosnia and Herzegovina) Marko Maksimović	Resigned	29 September 2025	10th	(Croatia) Dario Bašić	7 October 2025
Sloga	(Bosnia and Herzegovina) Vule Trivunović	Mutual consent	5 October 2025	5th	(Bosnia and Herzegovina) Marko Maksimović	7 October 2025
Željezničar	(Bosnia and Herzegovina) Admir Adžem	Resigned	7 December 2025	5th	(Slovenia) Slaviša Stojanović	29 December 2025
Široki Brijeg	(Croatia) Dean Klafurić	Mutual consent	6 January 2026	6th	(Croatia) Damir Milanović	8 January 2026
Sloga	(Bosnia and Herzegovina) Marko Maksimović	Mutual consent	16 February 2026	9th	(Bosnia and Herzegovina) Nedim Jusufbegović	20 February 2026
Željezničar	(Slovenia) Slaviša Stojanović	Mutual consent	22 February 2026	6th	(Serbia) Savo Milošević	3 March 2026
Željezničar	(Serbia) Savo Milošević	Resigned	14 May 2026	5th	(Bosnia and Herzegovina) Adin Mulaosmanović (interim)	14 May 2026

== League table ==
Pos	Team	Pld	W	D	L	GF	GA	GD	Pts	Qualification or relegation
1	Borac Banja Luka (C)	36	27	5	4	76	20	+56	86	Qualification for the Champions League first qualifying round
2	Zrinjski Mostar	36	21	8	7	48	25	+23	71	Qualification to Conference League second qualifying round
3	Sarajevo	36	19	8	9	54	37	+17	65	Qualification to Conference League first qualifying round
4	Velež Mostar	36	14	9	13	36	35	+1	51	Qualification to Conference League first qualifying round
5	Široki Brijeg	36	11	12	13	37	48	−11	45	
6	Željezničar	36	10	12	14	34	37	−3	42	
7	Radnik Bijeljina	36	8	11	17	27	45	−18	35	
8	Sloga Doboj	36	8	10	18	21	46	−25	34 (Note: Sloga finished ahead of Posušje on head-to-head points: Sloga 2–0 Posušje, Posušje 2–2 Sloga, Sloga 1–0 Posušje, Posušje 0–1 Sloga.)	
9	Posušje (R)	36	8	10	18	25	41	−16	34	Relegation to the Prva Liga FBiH
10	Rudar Prijedor (R)	36	7	9	20	31	55	−24	30	Relegation to the Prva Liga RS

Source: Rezultati.com
Rules for classification: 1) Points; 2) Goal difference; 3) Goals scored; 4) Head-to-head points; 5) Head-to-head goal difference; 6) Head-to-head away goals (only if two teams); 7) Head-to-head goals scored; 8) Goal difference; 9) Play-off. (Criteria 2 and 3 are not used to decide champion, UEFA competition qualification, or relegation)
(C) Champions; (R) Relegated

== Results ==
Home \ Away	BOR	POS	RAD	RUD	SAR	SLG	ŠB	VEL	ZRI	ŽEL	BOR	POS	RAD	RUD	SAR	SLG	ŠB	VEL	ZRI	ŽEL
Borac	—	3–1	5–1	6–0	5–1	2–1	5–1	1–0	0–1	2–1	—	2–0	1–0	3–0	2–0	3–1	5–1	2–2	3–0	1–0
Posušje	0–2	—	4–0	0–0	0–3	2–2	1–1	0–0	0–1	0–1	0–3	—	1–1	1–0	0–1	0–1	2–0	1–1	1–0	1–0
Radnik	0–1	2–0	—	2–1	2–2	0–0	0–0	3–0	0–2	1–0	0–0	0–1	—	1–0	1–2	0–0	2–0	1–0	0–1	0–3
Rudar	0–2	1–0	1–0	—	2–1	1–1	1–3	1–3	0–2	1–1	0–2	3–2	0–0	—	2–4	3–1	1–2	1–2	2–2	0–1
Sarajevo	1–0	2–1	4–4	1–0	—	1–0	0–0	2–0	1–1	4–0	0–1	3–0	2–0	2–2	—	4–0	2–2	1–0	2–1	1–0
Sloga	0–1	2–0	2–1	1–1	2–1	—	0–0	2–1	0–1	0–0	0–4	1–0	0–0	1–0	0–1	—	2–0	1–2	0–3	0–3
Široki Brijeg	1–2	1–1	1–3	1–0	2–1	1–0	—	1–3	1–2	1–0	0–1	1–1	4–0	0–1	1–0	1–0	—	1–0	2–1	1–1
Velež	1–1	0–1	1–0	1–0	0–0	2–0	1–0	—	1–3	0–1	0–0	1–0	1–0	4–2	2–3	0–0	3–0	—	0–1	1–0
Zrinjski	2–1	0–2	2–0	0–0	2–0	3–0	0–0	1–1	—	2–1	1–1	0–0	2–1	1–0	0–1	1–0	1–1	3–0	—	2–0
Željezničar	3–2	1–0	1–1	1–1	2–0	0–0	3–3	1–2	2–0	—	0–1	1–1	0–0	0–3	0–0	3–0	2–2	0–0	1–3	—

Source: Football Association of Bosnia and Herzegovina
Legend: Blue = home team win; Yellow = draw; Red = away team win.
For upcoming matches, an "a" indicates there is an article about the rivalry between the two participants.

== Top goalscorers ==
Rank	Player	Club	Goals
1	(Bosnia and Herzegovina) Luka Juričić	Borac	27
2	(Bosnia and Herzegovina) Nemanja Bilbija	Zrinjski	13
3	(Bosnia and Herzegovina) Mato Stanić	Široki Brijeg	11
4	(North Macedonia) Agon Elezi	Sarajevo	9
4	(Croatia) Toni Jović	Sloga	9
6	(Spain) Dani Romera	Rudar	8
7	(France) Mohamed Ghorzi	Radnik	7
7	(Austria) Stefan Savić	Borac	7
9	(Bosnia and Herzegovina) Damir Hrelja	Borac	6
9	(Croatia) Mihael Kuprešak	Sarajevo	6
9	(Ghana) Francis Kyeremeh	Sarajevo	6
9	(Serbia) Adem Ljajić	Sarajevo	6
9	(Bosnia and Herzegovina) Matej Šakota	Zrinjski	6
9	(Croatia) Ivan Šarić	Velež	6
9	(Bosnia and Herzegovina) David Vuković	Borac	6

== Attendances ==
Premier League clubs listed by average home league attendance:

Pos	Club	Average attendance
1	Željezničar	6,723
2	Sarajevo	3,567
3	Zrinjski Mostar	2,989
4	Borac	2,972
5	Velež Mostar	2,268
6	Posušje	1,889
7	Široki Brijeg	1,772
8	Rudar	1,414
9	Radnik	1,042
10	Sloga	707
