= 2021–22 Premier League of Bosnia and Herzegovina =

Premijer liga
- Season: 2021–22
- Dates: 16 July 2021 – 29 May 2022
- Champions: Zrinjski; 7th Premier League title 7th Bosnian title
- Relegated: Radnik; Rudar
- Champions League: Zrinjski
- Europa Conference League: Tuzla City; Borac; Velež
- Matches: 198
- Goals: 450 (2.27 per match)
- Top goalscorer: Nemanja Bilbija (33 goals)
- Biggest home win: Sarajevo 6–0 Posušje (20 March 2022); Sarajevo 6–0 Rudar (10 April 2022)
- Biggest away win: Borac 1–5 Zrinjski (16 August 2021)
- Highest scoring: Zrinjski 6–2 Leotar (3 December 2021)
- Longest winning run: Zrinjski (14 matches)
- Longest unbeaten run: Zrinjski (23 matches)
- Longest winless run: Rudar (15 matches)
- Longest losing run: Leotar (6 matches)
- Highest attendance: 11,000; Sarajevo 2–0 Željezničar (22 September 2021)
- Lowest attendance: 100; Tuzla City 2–2 Radnik (9 April 2022)
- Total attendance: 360,922
- Average attendance: 1,823

The 2021–22 Premier League of Bosnia and Herzegovina (known as m:tel Premier League for sponsorship reasons) was the 22nd season of the Premier League of Bosnia and Herzegovina, the highest football league of Bosnia and Herzegovina. The season began on 16 July 2021 and ended on 29 May 2022, with a winter break between early December 2021 and late February 2022.

Zrinjski Mostar secured a seventh Premier League title with seven matches to spare; it was also the club's third title in the last six seasons.

== Teams ==
A total of 12 teams contested in the league, including 9 sides from the 2020–21 season and three promoted from each of the second-level leagues, Posušje, Rudar Prijedor and Leotar, replacing relegated sides Mladost Doboj Kakanj, Olimpik and Krupa.

=== Stadiums and locations ===
Locations of the 2021–22 Premier League of BiH clubs

Note: Table lists in alphabetical order.

Team	Location	Stadium	Capacity
Borac	Banja Luka	Banja Luka City Stadium	10,030
Leotar	Trebinje	Police Stadium	8,550
Posušje	Posušje	Mokri Dolac	5,040
Radnik	Bijeljina	Bijeljina City Stadium	6,000
Rudar	Prijedor	Gradski stadion	3,540
Sarajevo	Sarajevo (Koševo)	Asim Ferhatović Hase	30,121
Sloboda	Tuzla	Tušanj	7,200
Široki Brijeg	Široki Brijeg	Pecara	5,147
Tuzla City	Tuzla	Tušanj	7,200
Velež	Mostar (Vrapčići)	Stadion Rođeni	7,000
Zrinjski	Mostar	Stadion pod Bijelim Brijegom	9,000
Željezničar	Sarajevo (Grbavica)	Grbavica	13,146

=== Personnel and kits ===
Note: Flags indicate national team as has been defined under FIFA eligibility rules. Players and Managers may hold more than one non-FIFA nationality.

Team	Head coach	Captain	Kit manufacturer	Shirt sponsor
Borac	(Croatia) Tomislav Ivković	(Bosnia and Herzegovina) Aleksandar Subić	Kelme	Mtel
Leotar	(Bosnia and Herzegovina) Miodrag Bodiroga	(Bosnia and Herzegovina) Đoko Milović	Kelme	Mozzart
Posušje	(Bosnia and Herzegovina) Toni Karačić	(Bosnia and Herzegovina) Davor Landeka	No1	Central osiguranje
Radnik	(Bosnia and Herzegovina) Velibor Đurić	(Bosnia and Herzegovina) Pavle Sušić	Givova	WWin
Rudar	(Bosnia and Herzegovina) Srđan Marjanović	(Bosnia and Herzegovina) Nemanja Pekija	Kelme	ArcelorMittal
Sarajevo	(Bosnia and Herzegovina) Dženan Uščuplić (caretaker)	(North Macedonia) Krste Velkoski	Erreà	Turkish Airlines
Sloboda	(Bosnia and Herzegovina) Amir Spahić (caretaker)	(Bosnia and Herzegovina) Muharem Čivić	Legea	WWin
Široki Brijeg	(Bosnia and Herzegovina) Ivica Barbarić	(Croatia) Božo Musa	Kelme	WWin
Tuzla City	(Bosnia and Herzegovina) Selver Ahmetović (caretaker)	(Bosnia and Herzegovina) Ajdin Nukić	No1	—
Velež	(Bosnia and Herzegovina) Feđa Dudić	(Bosnia and Herzegovina) Denis Zvonić	No1	Bosnalijek
Zrinjski	(Bosnia and Herzegovina) Sergej Jakirović	(Bosnia and Herzegovina) Nemanja Bilbija	Macron	M.T Abraham Group
Željezničar	(Bosnia and Herzegovina) Edis Mulalić	(Bosnia and Herzegovina) Samir Bekrić	Macron	Caizcoin

== League table ==
Pos	Team	Pld	W	D	L	GF	GA	GD	Pts	Qualification or relegation
1	Zrinjski Mostar (C)	33	26	6	1	74	14	+60	84	Qualification for the Champions League first qualifying round
2	Tuzla City	33	15	12	6	49	36	+13	57	Qualification to Europa Conference League first qualifying round
3	Borac Banja Luka	33	13	15	5	44	34	+10	54	Qualification to Europa Conference League first qualifying round
4	Sarajevo	33	13	7	13	37	33	+4	46	
5	Velež Mostar	33	13	8	12	42	37	+5	44 (Note: Velež were deducted 3 points due to their match against Borac in Round 10 being stopped because of Velež's fans invading the pitch.)	Qualification to Europa Conference League second qualifying round (Note: Velež qualified for the Europa Conference League second qualifying round by winning the 2021–22 Bosnian Cup.)
6	Željezničar	33	9	16	8	28	29	−1	43	
7	Široki Brijeg	33	8	15	10	31	35	−4	39	
8	Posušje	33	8	13	12	33	51	−18	37	
9	Leotar	33	9	7	17	25	46	−21	34	
10	Sloboda Tuzla	33	7	12	14	26	35	−9	33	
11	Radnik Bijeljina (R)	33	5	12	16	34	53	−19	27	Relegation to the Prva Liga RS
12	Rudar Prijedor (R)	33	5	11	17	28	48	−20	26	Relegation to the Prva Liga RS

Source: Rezultati.com
Rules for classification: 1) Points; 2) Goal difference; 3) Goals scored; 4) Head-to-head points; 5) Head-to-head goal difference; 6) Head-to-head away goals (only if two teams); 7) Head-to-head goals scored; 8) Goal difference; 9) Play-off. (Criteria 2 and 3 are not used to decide champion, UEFA competition qualification, or relegation)
(C) Champions; (R) Relegated

== Results ==
=== Rounds 1–22 ===
Home \ Away	BOR	LEO	POS	RAD	RUD	SAR	SLO	ŠB	TUZ	VEL	ZRI	ŽEL
Borac	—	0–0	3–0	4–3	1–0	1–0	3–1	2–1	1–1	2–0	1–5	1–1
Leotar	1–1	—	2–2	1–0	2–1	0–2	1–1	1–3	0–2	1–3	0–1	0–0
Posušje	1–0	1–0	—	1–1	0–0	0–2	1–0	2–2	1–1	2–4	0–0	2–0
Radnik	1–1	0–1	3–1	—	0–0	0–1	1–2	1–2	1–3	1–1	1–0	0–0
Rudar	1–1	1–2	3–0	2–0	—	0–2	1–1	1–1	0–1	2–2	0–1	2–2
Sarajevo	1–1	0–1	1–0	2–1	1–1	—	1–0	0–0	1–2	0–2	0–2	2–0
Sloboda	1–1	1–0	1–1	3–0	1–0	1–2	—	0–0	1–1	1–1	0–2	1–1
Široki Brijeg	0–3	2–0	1–1	0–0	2–1	2–1	0–0	—	2–1	0–1	0–0	0–0
Tuzla City	1–1	4–0	4–1	2–2	3–2	1–1	1–0	2–2	—	2–1	0–2	2–1
Velež	0–3 (Note: Borac was given a 3–0 win by default in Round 10 since the match was stopped because of Velež's fans invading the pitch.)	2–1	2–0	1–2	0–2	1–1	0–2	1–1	1–2	—	0–1	2–0
Zrinjski	4–1	6–2	3–1	4–1	3–0	1–0	1–0	4–0	1–1	2–1	—	3–0
Željezničar	1–1	1–0	1–0	2–0	2–0	2–0	1–1	1–0	2–1	0–0	0–3	—

Source: Football Association of Bosnia and Herzegovina
Legend: Blue = home team win; Yellow = draw; Red = away team win.
For upcoming matches, an "a" indicates there is an article about the rivalry between the two participants.

=== Rounds 23–33 ===
Home \ Away	BOR	LEO	POS	RAD	RUD	SAR	SLO	ŠB	TUZ	VEL	ZRI	ŽEL
Borac		2–0		1–0		1–0		1–1		2–1	1–1	
Leotar					2–0	1–1		1–0	0–0	2–1		
Posušje	3–0	2–0					0–0				2–2	3–2
Radnik		1–3	0–0		5–2		2–1			0–0		
Rudar	2–2		0–0				1–0				0–2	0–0
Sarajevo			6–0	1–0	6–0		1–0		0–1			1–1
Sloboda	2–1	1–0								1–2	0–2	1–1
Široki Brijeg			1–1	3–3	1–3	2–0	1–0		0–1			
Tuzla City	0–0		1–2	3–3	1–0		4–1					0–0
Velež			5–2		1–0	3–0		1–0	1–0			
Zrinjski		1–0		4–0		4–0		1–0	5–0	1–1		
Željezničar	0–0	3–0		1–1				0–0		1–0	1–2	

Source: Football Association of Bosnia and Herzegovina
Legend: Blue = home team win; Yellow = draw; Red = away team win.
For upcoming matches, an "a" indicates there is an article about the rivalry between the two participants.

== Top goalscorers ==
Rank	Player	Club	Goals
1	(Bosnia and Herzegovina) Nemanja Bilbija	Zrinjski	33
2	(Bosnia and Herzegovina) Sulejman Krpić	Tuzla City	14
3	(Bosnia and Herzegovina) Adnan Džafić	Tuzla City	11
4	(Bosnia and Herzegovina) Stojan Vranješ	Borac	10
5	(Croatia) Tonći Mujan	Široki Brijeg	9
5	(Bosnia and Herzegovina) Dženan Zajmović	Velež	9
7	(Bosnia and Herzegovina) Jovo Lukić	Borac	8
8	(Ghana) Joseph Amoah	Rudar	7
8	(Croatia) Nikola Mandić	Rudar	7
8	(Bosnia and Herzegovina) Mirzad Mehanović	Tuzla City	7
8	(Croatia) Ante Živković	Radnik	7
