= Denis Zvonić =

Bosnian footballer (born 1992)

Personal information
- Date of birth: 8 February 1992 (age 34)
- Place of birth: Mostar, Bosnia and Herzegovina
- Height: 1.92 m (6 ft 4 in)
- Position: Defender

Team information
- Current team: Velež Mostar (director)

Youth career
- –2011: Velež Mostar

Senior career*
Years	Team	Apps	(Gls)
2011–2015	Velež Mostar	93	(5)
2015–2016	Zvijezda Gradačac	15	(1)
2016–2024	Velež Mostar	195	(24)
Total		303	(30)

International career
2013	Bosnia and Herzegovina U21	1	(0)
- * Club domestic league appearances and goals

Denis Zvonić (born 8 February 1992) is a Bosnian former professional footballer who played as a defender. He spent the majority of his playing career as a centre-back for Velež Mostar.

== Club career ==
=== Velež Mostar ===
Zvonić started off his football career as a youngster at hometown club Velež Mostar's youth team. In July 2011, Zvonić signed with Velež's first team. Between 2011 and 2015, he was a standard player at the club, making 93 Bosnian Premier League appearances for Velež, scoring 5 goals during that period. In June 2015, Zvonić left Velež.

=== Zvijezda Gradačac ===
On 2 July 2015, Zvonić joined First League of FBiH club Zvijezda Gradačac. On 12 June 2016, he left Zvijezda.

=== Return to Velež Mostar ===
One year after leaving Velež, Zvonić returned to the club during the summer of 2016. During the club's winter preparations for the continuation of the 2018–19 First League of FBiH season in January 2019, he was named the new club captain after captain until that day, Elmir Kuduzović, gave him the captain armband.

On 24 January 2019, Zvonić extended his contract with Velež, which is due to last until June 2022. On 25 May 2019, he won the First League of FBiH with Velež after the club beat Bosna Visoko 0–2 away and got promoted back to the Bosnian Premier League.

On 28 July 2019, in a 1–0 away Mostar derby league loss against Zrinjski Mostar, Zvonić scored an own goal in the 54th minute of the game and at the end brought the victory to Zrinjski. On 19 October 2019, less than three months after scoring an own goal against Zrinjski, this time Zvonić scored a goal for Velež in the 86th minute against their fierce city rivals, bringing his team the first win in a Mostar derby match after more than 5 years.

In a league game against Sarajevo on 23 August 2020, Zvonić injured himself after breaking his nose.

== International career ==
Zvonić was part of the Bosnia and Herzegovina U21 national team and made one appearance for the team in 2014.

== Honours ==
Velež Mostar

- First League of FBiH: 2018–19
- Bosnian Cup: 2021–22
