= FK Sloga Doboj =

Association football club in Bosnia and Herzegovina

Sloga Doboj
- Full name: Fudbalski klub Sloga Doboj
- Nickname: Crveno-bijeli
- Founded: 19 July 1945; 81 years ago
- Ground: Luke Stadium
- Capacity: 3,000
- Chairman: Miroslav Kršić
- Manager: Duško Vranešević
- League: Premier League BH
- 2025–26: Premier League BH, 8th of 10
- Website: https://fksloga.ba/
Home colours	Away colours

Fudbalski klub Sloga Doboj (Serbian Cyrillic: ФК Слога Добој), also known as Sloga Meridian for sponsorship reasons, is an association football club from the city of Doboj in northern Republika Srpska, an entity of Bosnia and Herzegovina. The club competes in the Premier League of Bosnia and Herzegovina and plays its home matches at Stadion Luke, which has a capacity of 3,000.

== Honours ==
=== Domestic ===
==== League ====
- First League of the Republika Srpska:
  - Runners-up (3): 2007–08, 2011–12, 2021–22

== Players ==
=== Current squad ===
As of 11 September 2026

Note: Flags indicate national team as defined under FIFA eligibility rules; some limited exceptions apply. Players may hold more than one non-FIFA nationality.

No.	Pos.	Nation	Player
1	GK	ESP	Pere García
2	DF	CRO	Marat Žlibanović
3	DF	ESP	Roberto Corral
4	DF	BIH	Niko Božičković
5	DF	MEX	Pablo Jáquez
6	DF	ESP	Raúl Navarro
7	FW	ESP	Jorge Bolívar
8	MF	ESP	Fernán Ferreiroá
9	FW	ESP	Javi Cueto
10	MF	BIH	Mladen Veselinović
11	FW	ESP	Ferni
13	MF	BIH	Darko Savić
14	MF	BIH	Ajdin Redžić
17	DF	BIH	Jasmin Čeliković
19	MF	BIH	Sergej Damjanić

No.	Pos.	Nation	Player
20	FW	NGR	Lanre Kehinde
22	MF	ESP	Chuca
23	MF	ESP	Dani Molina
24	DF	ARG	Benjamín Garay
25	GK	SRB	Bojan Pavlović
26	FW	BIH	Damjan Koprivica
28	DF	SRB	Milan Milanović
29	DF	SRB	Nikola Pejović
33	DF	BIH	Josip Kvesić
44	FW	BIH	Milan Savić
55	MF	BIH	Ognjen Šešlak
92	FW	CRO	Toni Jović (captain)
99	MF	SRB	Jovan Đalović
—	GK	SLO	Nikolaj Ostojić

== Managerial history ==
- (Socialist Federal Republic of Yugoslavia) Nedeljko Gojković
- (Socialist Federal Republic of Yugoslavia) Miroslav Brozović
- (Socialist Federal Republic of Yugoslavia) Franjo Glaser
- (Socialist Federal Republic of Yugoslavia) Stevan Pozder
- (Socialist Federal Republic of Yugoslavia) Dimitrije "Mita" Tadić
- (Socialist Federal Republic of Yugoslavia) Ivo Radovniković
- (Socialist Federal Republic of Yugoslavia) Munib Saračević
- (Socialist Federal Republic of Yugoslavia) Vlatko Konjevod
- (Socialist Federal Republic of Yugoslavia) Vojislav Despotović
- (Bosnia and Herzegovina) Ferid Salihović
- (Bosnia and Herzegovina) Ivan "Ivica" Mioč
- (Bosnia and Herzegovina) Radoslav Zubanović
- (Bosnia and Herzegovina) Fuad Bećarević
- (Bosnia and Herzegovina) Sulejman Spahić
- (Bosnia and Herzegovina) Mujo Mujkić
- (Bosnia and Herzegovina) Asim Saračević
- (Bosnia and Herzegovina) Ismet Hadžiđulbić
- (Bosnia and Herzegovina) Emir Mulalić
- (Bosnia and Herzegovina) Josip Pranjić
- (Bosnia and Herzegovina) Mehmed Mujkanović
- (Bosnia and Herzegovina) Radivoje "Rade" Vasiljević
- (Bosnia and Herzegovina) Jefto Popadić
- (Bosnia and Herzegovina) Branislav Petričević
- (Serbia) Dejan Pešić
- (Bosnia and Herzegovina) Ljubiša Tripunović
- (Bosnia and Herzegovina) Zoran Ćurguz
- (Bosnia and Herzegovina) Zlatko Spasojević
- (Bosnia and Herzegovina) Zoran Ćurguz (2011–2013)
- (Bosnia and Herzegovina) Vedran Sofić (2013–2015)
- (Bosnia and Herzegovina) Mitar Lukić (2015–2017)
- (Bosnia and Herzegovina) Vedran Sofić (2017–2018)
- (Bosnia and Herzegovina) Danimir Milkanović (2018)
- (Bosnia and Herzegovina) Milan Draganović (2018–2021)
- (Bosnia and Herzegovina) Zoran Ćurguz (2021–2023)
- (Bosnia and Herzegovina) Vlado Jagodić (2023–2024)
- (Bosnia and Herzegovina) Nedim Jusufbegović (2024–2025)
- (Bosnia and Herzegovina) Vule Trivunović (2025)
- (Bosnia and Herzegovina) Marko Maksimović (2025–2026)
- (Bosnia and Herzegovina) Nedim Jusufbegović (2026)
- (Serbia) Perica Ognjenović (2026)
- (Bosnia and Herzegovina) Duško Vranešević (2026–present)
