= List of FK Velež Mostar seasons =

List of seasons for football club

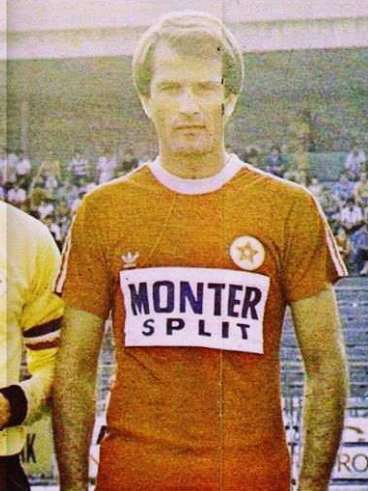
With 166 league goals, 14 goals in the Yugoslav Cup and 4 in European competitions, Dušan Bajević is Velež's all-time top scorer (184 goals)

FK Velež Mostar are historically one of the most successful clubs in Bosnia and Herzegovina, with two Yugoslav Cup titles (1980–81 and 1985–86), the most in that competition out of any side from Bosnia and Herzegovina. In addition they have also won the 2021–22 edition of the Bosnian Cup. They have come in second place on three occasions, and third place in five instances.

Velež has also qualified for the Conference League four times, while also participating in two former UEFA competitions, the UEFA Cup (four participations, including reaching the quarterfinals in 1974–75) and the Cup Winners' Cup (two participations).

Below is a list of seasons from Velež's debut in the top flight from the 1952–53 season onwards.

== Seasons ==
| Season | League | | | | | | | | | Cup | Europe/Other | | Top league goalscorer | |
| Season | Division | P | W | D | L | F | A | Pts | Pos | Cup | Europe/Other | | Player | Goals |
|---|---|---|---|---|---|---|---|---|---|---|---|---|---|---|
| 1952–53 | Yugoslav First League | 22 | 6 | 3 | 13 | 30 | 51 | 15 | 11th | | | | Vladimir Zelenika | 10 |
| 1953–54 | Yugoslav Second League | 18 | 11 | 1 | 6 | 41 | 22 | 23 | 3rd | | | | Vladimir Zelenika | 14 |
| 1954–55 | Yugoslav Second League | 18 | 13 | 2 | 3 | 43 | 15 | 28 | 1st | | | | Vladimir Zelenika | 14 |
| 1955–56 | Yugoslav First League | 26 | 8 | 9 | 9 | 42 | 41 | 25 | 7th | | | | Muhamed Mujić | 21 |
| 1956–57 | Yugoslav First League | 26 | 9 | 5 | 12 | 44 | 57 | 23 | 10th | R16 | | | Vladimir Zelenika | 14 |
| 1957–58 | Yugoslav First League | 26 | 11 | 4 | 11 | 40 | 42 | 26 | 6th | RU | | | Muhamed Mujić | 9 |
| 1958–59 | Yugoslav First League | 22 | 10 | 2 | 10 | 35 | 38 | 22 | 6th | R16 | | | Vladimir Zelenika | 10 |
| 1959–60 | Yugoslav First League | 22 | 5 | 7 | 10 | 27 | 39 | 17 | 10th | SF | | | Milorad Lazović | 9 |
| 1960–61 | Yugoslav First League | 22 | 5 | 7 | 10 | 27 | 39 | 17 | 9th | R32 | | | Milorad Lazović | 5 |
| 1961–62 | Yugoslav First League | 22 | 7 | 6 | 9 | 29 | 35 | 20 | 9th | QF | | | Nusret Čerkić; Ivan Popović | 6 |
| 1962–63 | Yugoslav First League | 26 | 10 | 8 | 8 | 33 | 31 | 28 | 4th | R32 | Intertoto Cup | GS | Nusret Čerkić; Zejnil Selimotić | 6 |
| 1963–64 | Yugoslav First League | 26 | 5 | 12 | 9 | 30 | 41 | 22 | 12th | R16 | Intertoto Cup | GS | Nusret Čerkić; Milorad Lazović; Zejnil Selimotić | 7 |
| 1964–65 | Yugoslav First League | 28 | 9 | 3 | 16 | 37 | 53 | 21 | 13th | | | | Kemal Šestić | 7 |
| 1965–66 | Yugoslav First League | 30 | 14 | 7 | 9 | 48 | 37 | 35 | 3rd | | | | Kemal Šestić | 15 |
| 1966–67 | Yugoslav First League | 30 | 9 | 10 | 11 | 35 | 41 | 28 | 10th | | | | Ahmet Glavović | 10 |
| 1967–68 | Yugoslav First League | 30 | 9 | 8 | 13 | 33 | 40 | 26 | 14th | | | | Dušan Bajević | 12 |
| 1968–69 | Yugoslav First League | 34 | 9 | 16 | 9 | 41 | 45 | 34 | 8th | | | | Dušan Bajević | 18 |
| 1969–70 | Yugoslav First League | 34 | 17 | 9 | 8 | 64 | 44 | 43 | 3rd | | | | Dušan Bajević | 20 |
| 1970–71 | Yugoslav First League | 34 | 14 | 8 | 12 | 52 | 48 | 36 | 8th | SF | | | Dušan Bajević | 18 |
| 1971–72 | Yugoslav First League | 34 | 14 | 10 | 10 | 58 | 32 | 38 | 6th | | | | Dušan Bajević | 20 |
| 1972–73 | Yugoslav First League | 34 | 17 | 12 | 5 | 48 | 27 | 46 | 2nd | | | | Dušan Bajević | 21 |
| 1973–74 | Yugoslav First League | 34 | 19 | 7 | 8 | 54 | 34 | 45 | 2nd | | UEFA Cup | R1 | Dušan Bajević | 16 |
| 1974–75 | Yugoslav First League | 34 | 15 | 9 | 10 | 62 | 35 | 39 | 4th | | UEFA Cup | QF | Vahid Halilhodžić | 16 |
| 1975–76 | Yugoslav First League | 34 | 10 | 12 | 12 | 39 | 37 | 32 | 9th | R16 | Mitropa Cup | RU | Vahid Halilhodžić | 17 |
| 1976–77 | Yugoslav First League | 34 | 11 | 10 | 13 | 46 | 48 | 32 | 11th | R32 | | | Vahid Halilhodžić | 18 |
| 1977–78 | Yugoslav First League | 34 | 13 | 9 | 12 | 42 | 43 | 35 | 7th | SF | | | Vahid Halilhodžić | 18 |
| 1978–79 | Yugoslav First League | 34 | 15 | 8 | 11 | 50 | 41 | 38 | 5th | R16 | | | Vahid Halilhodžić | 16 |
| 1979–80 | Yugoslav First League | 34 | 13 | 8 | 13 | 44 | 39 | 34 | 8th | R32 | | | Dragan Okuka | 12 |
| 1980–81 | Yugoslav First League | 34 | 13 | 8 | 13 | 44 | 47 | 34 | 9th | W | Balkans Cup | W | Vahid Halilhodžić | 11 |
| 1981–82 | Yugoslav First League | 34 | 13 | 10 | 11 | 49 | 40 | 36 | 7th | R32 | Cup Winners' Cup | R2 | Dušan Bajević | 10 |
| 1982–83 | Yugoslav First League | 34 | 11 | 9 | 14 | 54 | 57 | 31 | 13th | R16 | | | Vladimir Skočajić | 14 |
| 1983–84 | Yugoslav First League | 34 | 11 | 9 | 14 | 33 | 35 | 31 | 13th | R32 | | | Adnan Međedović | 9 |
| 1984–85 | Yugoslav First League | 34 | 10 | 12 | 12 | 39 | 44 | 32 | 11th | QF | | | Adnan Međedović | 9 |
| 1985–86 | Yugoslav First League | 34 | 13 | 11 | 10 | 64 | 50 | 37 | 3rd | W | | | Predrag Jurić | 19 |
| 1986–87 | Yugoslav First League | 34 | 19 | 4 | 11 | 65 | 46 | 42 | 2nd | R16 | Cup Winners' Cup | R2 | Predrag Jurić | 16 |
| 1987–88 | Yugoslav First League | 34 | 15 | 12 | 7 | 61 | 34 | 42 | 3rd | QF | UEFA Cup | R2 | Semir Tuce | 13 |
| 1988–89 | Yugoslav First League | 34 | 13 | 4 (2) | 17 | 42 | 43 | 28 | 11th | RU | UEFA Cup | R3 | Semir Tuce | 13 |
| 1989–90 | Yugoslav First League | 34 | 11 | 6 (3) | 17 | 38 | 51 | 25 | 17th | QF | | | Meho Kodro | 18 |
| 1990–91 | Yugoslav First League | 36 | 12 | 10 (6) | 14 | 54 | 55 | 30 | 12th | R32 | | | Meho Kodro | 13 |
| 1991–92 | Yugoslav First League | 26 | 10 | 5 (3) | 11 | 34 | 35 | 23 | n/a | QF | | | Zdenko Jedvaj; Nikola Juričić; Meho Kodro; Nenad Maslovar | 5 |
Break due to the Bosnian War
| 1994–95 | First League; Zenica Group | 3 | 0 | 0 | 3 | 2 | 11 | 9 | 4th | SF | | | Nermin Čolaković; Samir Ćemalović | 1 |
| 1995–96 | First League | 30 | 8 | 3 | 19 | 30 | 61 | 27 | 14th | | | | Samir Ćemalović | 9 |
| 1996–97 | First League | 30 | 13 | 4 | 13 | 44 | 41 | 43 | 10th | | | | Adis Obad | 16 |
| 1997–98 | First League | 30 | 11 | 7 | 12 | 44 | 52 | 40 | 10th | SF | | | Adis Obad | 13 |
| 1998–99 | First League | 30 | 15 | 7 | 8 | 46 | 37 | 52 | 4th | | | | Adis Obad | 11 |
| 1999–00 | First League | 30 | 14 | 6 | 10 | 59 | 37 | 48 | 7th | R16 | | | Asmir Džafić | 25 |
Current format of Premier League of Bosnia and Herzegovina
| 2000–01 | Premier League | 42 | 22 | 3 | 17 | 87 | 54 | 69 | 5th | R16 | | | Nedim Jusufbegović | 18 |
| 2001–02 | Premier League | 30 | 13 | 3 | 14 | 44 | 46 | 42 | 8th | R32 | | | Nedim Jusufbegović | 13 |
| 2002–03 | Premier League | 38 | 14 | 3 | 21 | 47 | 59 | 45 | 17th | QF | | | Asmir Džafić | 8 |
| 2003–04 | First League of FBiH | 30 | 18 | 4 | 8 | 61 | 25 | 58 | 2nd | R32 | | | Elvis Ćorić | 13 |
| 2004–05 | First League of FBiH | 30 | 20 | 3 | 7 | 55 | 23 | 63 | 2nd | R16 | | | Admir Vladavić; Dženan Zaimović | 9 |
| 2005–06 | First League of FBiH | 30 | 19 | 7 | 4 | 52 | 21 | 64 | 1st | R32 | | | Admir Velagić | 11 |
| 2006–07 | Premier League | 30 | 12 | 7 | 11 | 41 | 42 | 43 | 9th | R16 | | | Admir Velagić | 9 |
| 2007–08 | Premier League | 30 | 14 | 2 | 14 | 39 | 46 | 44 | 9th | R16 | | | Adis Obad | 7 |
| 2008–09 | Premier League | 30 | 11 | 4 | 15 | 42 | 45 | 41 | 12th | QF | | | Adis Obad | 10 |
| 2009–10 | Premier League | 30 | 13 | 4 | 13 | 42 | 33 | 43 | 7th | R16 | | | Adin Džafić | 13 |
| 2010–11 | Premier League | 30 | 11 | 3 | 16 | 31 | 43 | 36 | 13th | R32 | | | Ševko Okić | 10 |
| 2011–12 | Premier League | 30 | 8 | 9 | 13 | 28 | 35 | 33 | 11th | SF | | | Damir Rovčanin; Ševko Okić | 4 |
| 2012–13 | Premier League | 30 | 8 | 10 | 12 | 31 | 34 | 34 | 13th | R16 | | | Mirza Ćemalović | 8 |
| 2013–14 | Premier League | 30 | 15 | 9 | 6 | 42 | 23 | 54 | 5th | QF | | | Ševko Okić | 10 |
| 2014–15 | Premier League | 30 | 10 | 8 | 12 | 32 | 33 | 38 | 9th | QF | | | Alidin-Dino Hajdarović; Anel Hebibović | 6 |
| 2015–16 | Premier League | 30 | 1 | 6 | 23 | 10 | 55 | 9 | 16th | R32 | | | Dino Ćemalović | 2 |
| 2016–17 | First League of FBiH | 30 | 11 | 10 | 9 | 39 | 33 | 43 | 11th | R16 | | | Brandao | 8 |
| 2017–18 | First League of FBiH | 30 | 15 | 10 | 5 | 49 | 23 | 55 | 3rd | R32 | | | Brandao | 9 |
| 2018–19 | First League of FBiH | 30 | 24 | 4 | 2 | 78 | 18 | 76 | 1st | R32 | | | Nusmir Fajić | 28 |
| 2019–20 | Premier League | 22 | 9 | 5 | 8 | 25 | 23 | 32 | 8th | R16 | | | Brandao | 10 |
| 2020–21 | Premier League | 33 | 16 | 13 | 4 | 50 | 30 | 61 | 3rd | R16 | | | Obren Cvijanović | 11 |
| 2021–22 | Premier League | 33 | 13 | 8 | 12 | 42 | 37 | 44 | 5th | W | Europa Conference League | QR3 | Dženan Zajmović | 9 |
| 2022–23 | Premier League | 33 | 11 | 12 | 10 | 40 | 37 | 45 | 6th | RU | Europa Conference League | QR2 | Nermin Haskić | 12 |
| 2023–24 | Premier League | 33 | 16 | 11 | 6 | 50 | 28 | 59 | 3rd | QF | | | Nermin Haskić | 12 |
| 2024–25 | Premier League | 33 | 10 | 12 | 11 | 45 | 39 | 42 | 7th | QF | Conference League | QR1 | Mihael Mlinarić | 19 |
| 2025–26 | Premier League | 36 | 14 | 9 | 13 | 36 | 35 | 51 | 4th | RU | | | Ivan Šarić | 6 |
