= Moussa Diabang =

Senegalese footballer (born 1990)

Personal information
- Date of birth: 6 August 1990 (age 36)
- Place of birth: Abéné, Senegal
- Height: 1.81 m (5 ft 11 in)
- Position: Midfielder

Team information
- Current team: FC Bosna Aachen

Youth career
- –2009: Željezničar

Senior career*
Years	Team	Apps	(Gls)
2009–2010	Zvijezda Gradačac	3	(0)
2010–2011	Radnik Hadžići		
2011	FK Bosna Mionica		
2011–2015	Bratstvo Gračanica	72	(15)
2015–2016	NK Sloga Ljubuški		
2016–2021	Bratstvo Gračanica	113	(6)
2021–2022	FK Seona		
2023–	FC Bosna Aachen		
- * Club domestic league appearances and goals as of 24 October 2020

Moussa Diabang (born 6 August 1990) is a Senegalese professional footballer who plays as a midfielder who plays for FC Bosna Aachen.

== Club career ==
=== Bosnia and Herzegovina ===
In January 2016, Diabang signed a contract with Bosnian club Bratstvo Gračanica. Diabang remained in Bratstvo Gračanica until 2021 when he left the club.

In July 2021, Diabang signed a contract with Bosnian club FK Seona. He left the club in July 2022.

== Personal life ==
In Bosnia and Herzegovina, Diabang found his wife with whom he has two children.

== Career statistics ==
=== Club ===
As of match played 24 October 2020

Appearances and goals by club, season and competition
Club	Season	League			National cup (Note: Appearance(s) in Bosnia and Herzegovina Football Cup)		Europe		Total	
Club	Season	League	Apps	Goals	Apps	Goals	Apps	Goals	Apps	Goals
Zvijezda Gradačac	2009–10	Bosnian Premier League	3	0	0	0	—		3	0
Bratstvo Gračanica	2012–13	First League of FBiH	24	7	0	0	—		24	7
Bratstvo Gračanica	2013–14	First League of FBiH	25	5	3	1	–		28	6
Bratstvo Gračanica	2014–15	First League of FBiH	23	3	1	0	–		24	3
Bratstvo Gračanica	2015–16	First League of FBiH	13	2	0	0	–		13	2
Bratstvo Gračanica	2016–17	First League of FBiH	25	2	1	0	–		26	2
Bratstvo Gračanica	2017–18	First League of FBiH	24	2	2	1	–		26	3
Bratstvo Gračanica	2018–19	First League of FBiH	26	0	0	0	–		26	0
Bratstvo Gračanica	2019–20	First League of FBiH	14	0	1	0	–		15	0
Bratstvo Gračanica	2020–21	First League of FBiH	11	0	0	0	–		11	0
Bratstvo Gračanica	Total		185	21	8	2	0	0	193	23
Career total			188	21	8	2	0	0	196	23
