= 2017–18 First League of the Federation of Bosnia and Herzegovina =

First League of the Federation of Bosnia and Herzegovina
- Season: 2017–18
- Champions: Sloga Simin Han
- Promoted: Sloga Simin Han
- Relegated: Iskra Bugojno; Travnik
- Matches: 240
- Goals: 619 (2.58 per match)
- Top goalscorer: Jasmin Mujkić (21 goals)
- Total attendance: 94,870
- Average attendance: 408

The 2017–18 First League of the Federation of Bosnia and Herzegovina was the eighteenth season of the First League of the Federation of Bosnia and Herzegovina, the second tier football league of Bosnia and Herzegovina. It began on 5 August 2017 and ended on 2 June 2018. GOŠK Gabela were the last champions, having won their second championship title in the 2016–17 season and earning a promotion to Premier League of Bosnia and Herzegovina.

== Teams ==
Location of clubs in 2017–18 First League of the FBiH

Team	Location	Stadium	Capacity
Bosna	Visoko	Luke Stadium, Visoko	5,200
Bratstvo	Gračanica	Gradski Stadion Luke, Gračanica	3,000
Čapljina	Čapljina	Bjelave Stadium	3,000
Iskra	Bugojno	Jaklić Stadium	11,000
Igman	Konjic	Gradski Stadion, Konjic	5,000
Jedinstvo	Bihać	Pod Borićima Stadium	7,500
Metalleghe-BSI	Jajce	Mračaj Stadium	3,000
Olimpik	Sarajevo	Otoka Stadium	3,000
Orašje	Orašje	Gradski Stadion, Orašje	4,000
Rudar	Kakanj	FK Rudar Stadium	4,568
Slaven	Živinice	Gradski Stadion, Živinice	500
Sloga	Simin Han	Stadion Sloge	3,000
TOŠK	Tešanj	Luke Stadium, Tešanj	7,000
Travnik	Travnik	Pirota Stadium	3,200
Velež	Mostar	Stadion Rođeni	5,200
Zvijezda	Gradačac	Banja Ilidža	8,000

== League table ==
Pos	Team	Pld	W	D	L	GF	GA	GD	Pts	Promotion or relegation
1	Sloga Simin Han (C, P)	30	21	3	6	61	23	+38	66	Promotion to the Premijer Liga BiH
2	Olimpik	30	18	7	5	44	20	+24	61	
3	Velež Mostar	30	15	10	5	49	23	+26	55	
4	Zvijezda Gradačac	30	14	8	8	38	24	+14	50	
5	Orašje	30	14	5	11	46	37	+9	47	
6	Bratstvo Gračanica	30	14	3	13	49	42	+7	45	
7	Rudar Kakanj	30	13	3	14	37	34	+3	42	
8	Metalleghe-BSI	30	11	8	11	40	41	−1	41	
9	TOŠK Tešanj	30	11	5	14	35	38	−3	38	
10	Bosna Visoko	30	10	7	13	42	49	−7	37	
11	Čapljina	30	10	7	13	37	47	−10	37	
12	Slaven Živinice	30	10	7	13	33	46	−13	37	
13	Igman	30	10	6	14	31	35	−4	36	
14	Jedinstvo Bihać	30	10	3	17	28	63	−35	33	
15	Iskra (R)	30	9	5	16	27	46	−19	32	Relegation to the Second League FBiH
16	Travnik (R)	30	4	5	21	21	50	−29	17	Relegation to the Second League FBiH

Source: NS FBiH
Rules for classification: 1) Points; 2) Head-to-head points; 3) Head-to-head goal difference; 4) Head-to-head goals scored; 5) Head-to-head away goals scored (only if two teams); 6) Goal difference; 7) Goals scored; 8) Play-off.
(C) Champions; (P) Promoted; (R) Relegated

== Results ==
Home \ Away	BOV	BRT	ČAP	IGM	ISK	JED	MET	OLI	ORA	RKA	SŽI	SSH	TTE	TRA	VEL	ZVI
Bosna Visoko		5–2	1–1	2–1	2–0	5–0	3–1	1–4	1–0	0–2	3–2	0–1	0–3	2–1	0–0	1–1
Bratstvo Gračanica	3–2		3–2	2–0	3–2	4–0	3–1	1–2	4–0	0–0	4–0	1–4	1–2	3–1	3–1	1–0
Čapljina	1–1	3–3		0–0	0–2	1–0	3–2	0–3	3–0	2–1	3–1	1–2	2–0	1–1	2–3	2–2
Igman	1–2	1–3	3–0		1–0	2–1	2–0	2–1	0–0	2–1	2–0	1–1	2–1	2–0	0–0	0–1
Iskra	3–1	1–0	1–2	0–0		2–3	2–1	1–1	2–3	1–0	0–3	0–0	2–1	1–0	0–0	0–3
Jedinstvo Bihać	2–1	2–0	0–1	2–1	1–2		2–1	0–3	2–1	0–1	1–0	1–0	1–5	1–1	3–6	1–0
Metalleghe-BSI	3–1	1–0	1–2	1–0	1–0	1–1		0–0	2–1	3–2	1–0	2–2	4–1	1–0	1–3	0–0
Olimpic	1–0	2–1	1–0	1–0	3–1	2–1	0–1		0–1	1–0	3–0	2–0	0–0	3–1	0–0	1–0
Orašje	3–2	1–1	3–1	2–0	1–0	5–0	1–1	1–2		1–0	2–2	0–2	1–2	6–1	1–1	4–1
Rudar Kakanj	1–1	3–0	2–0	1–1	1–0	4–0	4–1	3–2	1–2		0–1	0–1	2–1	0–1	1–0	3–1
Slaven Živinice	1–0	1–0	3–1	1–0	2–2	2–0	1–1	1–1	2–0	2–0		2–0	1–2	1–0	1–1	0–1
Sloga Simin Han	6–1	2–0	2–1	5–2	4–0	6–0	2–0	2–1	1–0	3–0	3–0		2–0	1–0	1–2	1–2
TOŠK	0–2	2–0	4–1	2–0	2–0	0–0	0–0	1–2	0–2	0–1	4–2	0–2		1–0	1–1	0–0
Travnik	2–2	0–2	0–1	0–3	3–0	0–3	2–4	1–1	2–3	0–2	0–0	0–2	1–0		0–2	0–1
Velež	0–0	0–2	0–0	3–1	3–0	2–0	3–0	0–1	1–0	4–2	3–0	3–0	4–0	1–0		1–1
Zvijezda	3–0	1–0	2–0	2–1	1–2	4–0	0–0	0–0	0–1	2–0	2–2	2–0	2–0	1–3	2–1	

Updated to match(es) played on unknown. Source: NS FBiH
Legend: Blue = home team win; Yellow = draw; Red = away team win.

== Statistics ==
=== Top goalscorers ===
Rank	Player	Club	Goals
1	(Bosnia and Herzegovina) Jasmin Mujkić	Bratstvo	21
2	(Bosnia and Herzegovina) Mirnes Salihović	Slaven Živinice	15
2	(Bosnia and Herzegovina) Dženan Haračić	Metalleghe-BSI	15
3	(Bosnia and Herzegovina) Husein Poturalić	Sloga Simin Han	12
3	(Bosnia and Herzegovina) Antonio Vidović	Orašje	12
5	(Bosnia and Herzegovina) Idriz Džafić	Igman	11
5	(Bosnia and Herzegovina) Joco Stokić	Sloga Simin Han	11
5	(Bosnia and Herzegovina) Obren Cvijanović	Zvijezda	11
5	(Bosnia and Herzegovina) Nikola Leko	Čapljina	11
5	(Brazil) Brandao	Velež	9
9	(Bosnia and Herzegovina) Belmin Kobilica	Rudar Kakanj	8
9	(Bosnia and Herzegovina) Bajro Spahić	Rudar Kakanj	8
9	(Bosnia and Herzegovina) Geodon Guzina	Zvijezda	8
9	(Bosnia and Herzegovina) Mirel Ibrahimović	Sloga Simin Han	8
9	(Bosnia and Herzegovina) Marinko Rastoka	Travnik	8

== See also ==
- 2017–18 Premier League of Bosnia and Herzegovina
- 2017–18 First League of the Republika Srpska
- 2017–18 Bosnia and Herzegovina Football Cup
