= 2015–16 First League of the Federation of Bosnia and Herzegovina =

First League of the Federation of Bosnia and Herzegovina
- Season: 2015–16
- Champions: Metalleghe-BSI
- Promoted: Metalleghe-BSI
- Relegated: Branitelj; Sloga Ljubuški; Podgrmeč
- Matches: 240
- Goals: 591 (2.46 per match)
- Top goalscorer: Boris Gavrić (24 goals)

The 2015–16 First League of the Federation of Bosnia and Herzegovina was the sixteenth season of the First League of the Federation of Bosnia and Herzegovina, the second tier football league of Bosnia and Herzegovina. It began on 8 August 2015 and ended on 4 June 2016. Mladost Doboj Kakanj were the last champions, having won their first championship title in the 2014–15 season and earning a promotion to Premier League of Bosnia and Herzegovina.

== Teams ==
Location of clubs in 2015–16 First League of the FBiH

Team	Location	Stadium	Capacity
Branitelj	Rodoč, Mostar	SC Rodoč	500
Bosna Visoko	Visoko	Luke Stadium	5,200
Bratstvo	Gračanica	Gradski Stadion Luke, Gračanica	3,000
Budućnost	Banovići	Jaklić Stadium	11,000
Čapljina	Čapljina	Bjelave Stadium	3,000
GOŠK	Gabela	Perica-Pero Pavlović Stadium	5,000
Goražde	Goražde	Midhat Drljević Stadium	1,500
Jedinstvo	Bihać	Pod Borićima Stadium	7,500
Metalleghe-BSI	Jajce	Stadion Mračaj	3,000
Novi Travnik	Novi Travnik	Gradski Stadion, Novi Travnik	1,000
Orašje	Orašje	Gradski Stadion, Orašje	4,000
Podgrmeč	Sanski Most	Gradski Stadion, Sanski Most	1,500
Radnički	Lukavac	Jošik Stadium	3,000
Rudar	Kakanj	FK Rudar Stadium	4,568
Sloga	Ljubuški	Babovac Stadium	4,000
Zvijezda	Gradačac	Banja Ilidža	8,000

== League table ==
Pos	Team	Pld	W	D	L	GF	GA	GD	Pts	Promotion or relegation
1	Metalleghe-BSI (C, P)	30	18	7	5	52	24	+28	61	Promotion to the Premijer Liga BiH
2	Zvijezda Gradačac	30	18	5	7	49	26	+23	59	
3	Orašje	30	13	8	9	41	28	+13	47	
4	Bosna Visoko	30	15	2	13	47	36	+11	47	
5	Čapljina	30	13	8	9	39	30	+9	47	
6	Bratstvo Gračanica	30	14	4	12	38	30	+8	46	
7	Budućnost	30	14	4	12	34	27	+7	46	
8	GOŠK Gabela	30	12	9	9	33	27	+6	45	
9	Rudar Kakanj	30	13	5	12	40	32	+8	44	
10	Jedinstvo Bihać	30	13	4	13	41	34	+7	43	
11	Goražde	30	13	3	14	31	31	0	42	
12	Novi Travnik	30	12	5	13	51	43	+8	41	
13	Radnički Lukavac	30	10	8	12	38	46	−8	38	
14	Branitelj (R)	30	7	6	17	23	44	−21	27	Relegation to the Second League FBiH
15	Sloga Ljubuški (R)	30	4	9	17	17	39	−22	21	Relegation to the Second League FBiH
16	Podgrmeč (R)	30	5	5	20	17	94	−77	20	Relegation to the Second League FBiH

Source: NS FBiH
Rules for classification: 1) Points; 2) Head-to-head points; 3) Head-to-head goal difference; 4) Head-to-head goals scored; 5) Head-to-head away goals scored (only if two teams); 6) Goal difference; 7) Goals scored; 8) Play-off.
(C) Champions; (P) Promoted; (R) Relegated

== Statistics ==
=== Top goalscorers ===
Rank	Player	Club	Goals
1	(Croatia) Boris Gavrić	Novi Travnik	24
2	(Bosnia and Herzegovina) Halid Delić	Jedinstvo	17
3	(Bosnia and Herzegovina) Elvin Suljić	Radnički	10
3	(Bosnia and Herzegovina) Amil Dilberović	Metalleghe-BSI	10
3	(Bosnia and Herzegovina) Salko Jazvin	Čapljina	10
