= 2016–17 First League of the Federation of Bosnia and Herzegovina =

First League of the Federation of Bosnia and Herzegovina
- Season: 2016–2017
- Champions: GOŠK Gabela
- Promoted: GOŠK Gabela
- Relegated: Goražde; Radnički Lukavac; Budućnost Banovići; Bosna Sema; Novi Travnik
- Matches: 240
- Goals: 606 (2.53 per match)
- Top goalscorer: Mirnes Salihović; Sabahudin Jusufbašić (19 goals)

The 2016–2017 First League of the Federation of Bosnia and Herzegovina was the seventeenth season of the First League of the Federation of Bosnia and Herzegovina, the second tier football league of Bosnia and Herzegovina. It began on 6 August 2016 and ended on 3 June 2017. Metalleghe-BSI were the last champions, having won their first ever championship title in the 2015–16 season and earning a promotion to Premier League of Bosnia and Herzegovina.

== Teams ==
Location of clubs in 2016–17 First League of the FBiH

Team	Location	Stadium	Capacity
Bosna Sema	Ilidža	Otoka Stadium	3,000
Bosna Visoko	Visoko	Luke Stadium	5,200
Bratstvo	Gračanica	Gradski Stadion Luke, Gračanica	3,000
Budućnost	Banovići	Jaklić Stadium	11,000
Čapljina	Čapljina	Bjelave Stadium	3,000
GOŠK	Gabela	Perica-Pero Pavlović Stadium	5,000
Goražde	Goražde	Midhat Drljević Stadium	1,500
Jedinstvo	Bihać	Pod Borićima Stadium	7,500
Novi Travnik	Novi Travnik	Gradski Stadion, Novi Travnik	1,000
Orašje	Orašje	Gradski Stadion, Orašje	4,000
Radnički	Lukavac	Jošik Stadium	3,000
Rudar	Kakanj	FK Rudar Stadium	4,568
Sloga	Simin Han	Stadion Sloge	3,000
Travnik	Travnik	Pirota Stadium	3,200
Velež	Mostar	Stadion Rođeni	5,200
Zvijezda	Gradačac	Banja Ilidža	8,000

== League table ==
Pos	Team	Pld	W	D	L	GF	GA	GD	Pts	Promotion or relegation
1	GOŠK Gabela (C, P)	30	16	8	6	50	26	+24	56	Promotion to the Premijer Liga BiH
2	Bosna Visoko	30	15	5	10	39	29	+10	50	
3	Sloga Simin Han	30	15	3	12	43	36	+7	48	
4	Rudar Kakanj	30	13	3	14	40	28	+12	42	
5	Čapljina	30	13	7	10	34	25	+9	46	
6	Travnik	30	12	10	8	44	36	+8	46	
7	Bratstvo Gračanica	30	13	6	11	43	34	+9	45	
8	Zvijezda Gradačac	30	13	6	11	40	32	+8	45	
9	Orašje	30	12	8	10	40	42	−2	44	
10	Jedinstvo Bihać	30	12	8	10	34	37	−3	44	
11	Velež Mostar	30	11	10	9	39	33	+6	43	
12	Goražde (R)	30	12	7	11	35	32	+3	43	Relegation to the Second League FBiH
13	Radnički Lukavac (R)	30	11	3	16	37	51	−14	36	Relegation to the Second League FBiH
14	Budućnost (R)	30	10	5	15	36	40	−4	35	Relegation to the Second League FBiH
15	Bosna Sema (R)	30	9	5	16	38	46	−8	32	Relegation to the Second League FBiH
16	Novi Travnik (R)	30	2	4	24	14	79	−65	10	Relegation to the Second League FBiH

Source: NS FBiH
Rules for classification: 1) Points; 2) Head-to-head points; 3) Head-to-head goal difference; 4) Head-to-head goals scored; 5) Head-to-head away goals scored (only if two teams); 6) Goal difference; 7) Goals scored; 8) Play-off.
(C) Champions; (P) Promoted; (R) Relegated

== Statistics ==
=== Top goalscorers ===
Source: NSFBIH.ba

Rank	Player	Club	Goals
1	(Bosnia and Herzegovina) Mirnes Salihović	Radnički	19
1	(Bosnia and Herzegovina) Sabahudin Jusufbašić	Travnik	19
3	(Bosnia and Herzegovina) Mirsad Ramić	GOŠK Gabela	18
4	(Bosnia and Herzegovina) Salko Jazvin	Čapljina	14
4	(Bosnia and Herzegovina) Igor Radovanović	Sloga Simin Han	14
6	(Bosnia and Herzegovina) Igor Aničić	Rudar Kakanj	13
7	(Bosnia and Herzegovina) Mirel Ibrahimović	Sloga Simin Han	12
8	(Bosnia and Herzegovina) Nihad Mujić	Bosna Sema	11
9	(Bosnia and Herzegovina) Aleksandar Glišić	Zvijezda	10
10	(Bosnia and Herzegovina) Amar Čebarović	Bosna Visoko	9
