= Darío Ferreyra =

Argentine professional footballer

Personal information
- Full name: Fernando Darío Ferreyra
- Date of birth: 19 January 1997 (age 29)
- Place of birth: Buenos Aires, Argentina
- Height: 1.68 m (5 ft 6 in)
- Position: Right-back

Team information
- Current team: Puerto Nuevo

Youth career
- Boca Juniors

Senior career*
Years	Team	Apps	(Gls)
2018–2021	Velež Mostar	85	(1)
2021–2023	Tuzla City	26	(0)
2024–2026	Deportivo Merlo	28	(0)
- * Club domestic league appearances and goals as of 16 November 2025

Fernando Darío Ferreyra (born 19 January 1997) is an Argentine professional footballer who plays as a right-back.

== Career ==
Ferreyra is a product of the Boca Juniors academy. However, after failing to make a breakthrough at first-team level, Ferreyra left for Bosnian football with, at the time, First League of FBiH team Velež Mostar in early 2018. He played in the remaining months of the 2017–18 season, though injuries affected his impact. Ferreyra made twenty-six appearances, all as a starter, and netted one in 2018–19 as Velež were promoted as champions to the Premier League. His top-flight debut arrived on 20 July 2019 versus Mladost Doboj Kakanj.

== Career statistics ==
As of match played 19 November 2022.

Appearances and goals by club, season and competition
Club	Season	League			National cup (Note: Includes Bosnian Cup)		Continental		Total	
Club	Season	Division	Apps	Goals	Apps	Goals	Apps	Goals	Apps	Goals
Velež Mostar	2017–18	First League of FBiH	11	0	—		—		11	0
Velež Mostar	2018–19	First League of FBiH	26	0	1	0	—		27	0
Velež Mostar	2019–20	Bosnian Premier League	18	0	0	0	—		18	0
Velež Mostar	2020–21	Bosnian Premier League	25	1	2	0	—		27	1
Velež Mostar	2021–22	Bosnian Premier League	5	0	0	0	4 (Note: Appearances in UEFA Conference League)	0	9	0
Velež Mostar	Total		85	1	3	0	4	0	92	1
Tuzla City	2021–22	Bosnian Premier League	10	0	—		—		10	0
Tuzla City	2022–23	Bosnian Premier League	16	0	0	0	4	0	20	0
Tuzla City	Total		26	0	0	0	4	0	30	0
Career total			111	1	3	0	8	0	122	1

== Honours ==
Velež Mostar

- First League of FBiH: 2018–19
