= Ivo Ištuk =

Bosnian football manager (born 1953)

Personal information
- Date of birth: 18 November 1953 (age 72)
- Place of birth: Livno, FPR Yugoslavia

Managerial career
- Years: Team
- 1997–2000: Bosna Visoko
- 2000–2001: Brotnjo
- 2002–2004: Široki Brijeg
- 2005: Željezničar
- 2007–2008: Čelik Zenica
- 2009: Imotski
- 2009: Čelik Zenica
- 2010–2011: Široki Brijeg
- 2011–2012: Rijeka
- 2013: Bosna Visoko
- 2014: Hartberg
- 2016: Čelik Zenica
- 2017−2019: Bosna Visoko

Ivo Ištuk (born 18 November 1953) is a Bosnian former professional football manager. He is regarded as one of the most successful Bosnian football managers.

== Managerial career ==
=== Bosna Visoko ===
Ištuk began his managerial career at Bosna Visoko. He managed Bosna from 1997 until the winter of 2000. He is the club's most successful manager as he won the 1998–99 Bosnian Cup, 1999 Bosnian Supercup and led the team to the 1997–98 Bosnian First League group stage play-offs.

=== Brotnjo ===
In 2000, Ištuk became the new manager of Brotnjo as he replaced Blaž Slišković who left the position to become an assistant to Mišo Smajlović in the Bosnia and Herzegovina national team.

As the manager of Brotnjo, he led the club to win the 1999–2000 Bosnian First League. Ištuk was adored by the fans while at the club. While he was the manager, Brotnjo was known as a club that played one of the most beautiful football in Bosnia and Herzegovina at the time. Ištuk left the club in the summer of 2001.

=== Široki Brijeg ===
In July 2002, Ištuk became the new manager of Široki Brijeg. While at Široki, he once again showed what a great manager he is as he won the 2003–04 Bosnian Premier League. In June 2004, he left Široki after not wanting to extend his contract.

=== Željezničar ===
In January 2005, Ištuk was named new manager of Željezničar. He left Željezničar after the club finished 2nd and qualified for the 2005–06 UEFA Cup qualifying rounds.

The reason for him leaving the club was the big financial issues Željezničar had at the time. Shortly after, Željezničar weren't eligible to compete in the UEFA Cup as it did not fulfill the criteria at the time.

=== Čelik Zenica ===
In June 2007, Ištuk became the new manager of Čelik Zenica. During the whole 2007–08 season, Čelik were one of the favourites to win the league. Ultimately they finished 3rd, qualifying for the 2008 UEFA Intertoto Cup First round.

On 28 October 2008, he was sacked after a poor start to the 2008–09 season.

=== Later career ===
After Čelik, Ištuk managed a number of other clubs. From January to May 2009, he managed Imotski in the Croatian 2. HNL, from June to August 2009 he once again managed Čelik, from May 2010 to March 2011 he again managed Široki Brijeg, from October 2011 to March 2012 he managed Rijka in the Croatian First League, from January to May 2013 Bosna Visoko again, and from June to July 2014 Austrian club Hartberg. For a short period in 2016, he also managed Čelik for a third time.

Most recently and for a third time in his career as well, Ištuk was manager of Bosna Visoko, getting appointed in April 2017. In the 2018−19 First League of FBiH season, Bosna under Ištuk's wing finished in last place in the league and got relegated for a third time in the club's history to the Second League of FBiH (Group Center). Shortly after getting relegated, in July 2019, he decided to leave Bosna alongside his whole coaching staff, after which former Bosna manager Faruk Dedić returned to the position of the club's manager.

== Managerial statistics ==
As of match played 1 June 2019

Managerial record by team and tenure
Team	From	To	Record				
Team	From	To	G	W	D	L	Win %
Bosna Visoko	June 1997	January 2000	89	50	9	30	56.18
Brotnjo	January 2000	June 2001	65	43	11	11	66.15
Široki Brijeg	July 2002	June 2004	73	42	10	21	57.53
Željezničar	January 2005	May 2005	15	5	4	6	33.33
Čelik Zenica	June 2009	August 2009	4	0	1	3	0.00
Široki Brijeg	May 2010	March 2011	25	11	3	11	44.00
Rijeka	October 2011	March 2012	9	2	4	3	22.22
Bosna Visoko	January 2013	May 2013	9	3	3	3	33.33
Hartberg	June 2014	July 2014	1	1	0	0	100.00
Čelik Zenica	September 2016	November 2016	6	0	1	5	0.00
Bosna Visoko	April 2017	July 2019	76	18	12	46	23.68
Total			372	175	58	139	47.04

== Honours ==
Bosna Visoko

- Bosnian Cup: 1998–99
- Bosnian Supercup: 1999

Brotnjo

- Bosnian First League: 1999–2000

Široki Brijeg

- Bosnian Premier League: 2003–04
