= 2012–13 First League of the Federation of Bosnia and Herzegovina =

First League of the Federation of Bosnia and Herzegovina
- Season: 2012–13
- Champions: Vitez; 1st First League title
- Promoted: Vitez
- Relegated: Bosna; Goražde; Krajina; Krajišnik
- Matches: 142
- Goals: 381 (2.68 per match)
- Top goalscorer: Haris Dilaver; Ante Pinjuh (10 goals)
- Biggest home win: Bratstvo 6–0 Branitelj; Čapljina 6–0 Krajišnik; Vitez 6–0 Krajišnik
- Biggest away win: Bratstvo 0–3 Vitez; Krajišnik 0–3 Jedinstvo
- Highest scoring: 9 goals Branitelj 7–2 Krajišnik
- Longest winning run: 6 matches Vitez
- Longest unbeaten run: 15 matches Radnički
- Longest winless run: 14 matches Krajišnik
- Longest losing run: 14 matches Krajišnik
- Highest attendance: 3,500 (Lukavac, Radnički against Sloboda)
- Lowest attendance: 30
- Total attendance: 41,900
- Average attendance: 355

The 2012–13 First League of the Federation of Bosnia and Herzegovina was the thirteenth season of the First League of the Federation of Bosnia and Herzegovina, the second tier football league of Bosnia and Herzegovina. The 2012–13 fixtures were announced on 6 July 2012. It began on 11 August 2012 and will end on sometimes at the begin of June 2012; a winter break where no matches are played will be in effect between 18 November 2011 and 9 March 2012. Gradina were the last champions, having won their first championship title in the 2011–12 season and earning a promotion to Premier League of Bosnia and Herzegovina.

Sixteen clubs are participating in this session, eleven returning from the previous session, one relegated from Premier League of Bosnia and Herzegovina and four promoted from four regional Second League of the Federation of Bosnia and Herzegovina.

== Changes from last season ==
=== Team changes ===
==== From First League of the FBiH ====
Promoted to Premier League

- Gradina

Relegated to one of 4 respective regional Second League of the FBiH

- UNIS (Second League of the FBiH – Center)
- Famos-SAŠK Napredak (Second League of the FBiH – Center)
- Orašje (Second League of the FBiH – North)
- Omladinac (Second League of the FBiH – North)

==== To First League of FBiH ====
Relegated from Premier League

- Sloboda

Promoted from four regional Second League of the FBiH

- Radnički (Second League of the FBiH – North)
- Troglav (Second League of the FBiH – South)
- Podgrmeč (Second League of the FBiH – West)
- Bosna (Second League of the FBiH – Center)

== Teams ==
UNIS, Famos-SAŠK Napredak, Orašje and Omladinac were relegated to their respective third-level league at the end of the 2011–12 season. For Famos-SAŠK Napredak and Orašje this is the worst league tier they played in since independence of BiH. The relegated teams were replaced by the champions of the four third–level leagues, Radnički from the Second League of the FBiH – North, Troglav from the Second League of the FBiH – South, Podgrmeč from the Second League of the FBiH – West and Bosna from the Second League of the FBiH – Center.

=== Stadions and locations ===
Location of clubs in 2012–13 First League of the FBiH

Team	Location	Stadium	Capacity
Bosna	Visoko	Luke Stadium	5,200
Branitelj	Rodoč, Mostar	SC Rodoč	300
Bratstvo	Gračanica	Gradski Stadion Luke, Gračanica	3,000
Budućnost	Banovići	FK Budućnost Stadium	4,600
Čapljina	Čapljina	Bjelave Stadium	3,000
Goražde	Goražde	Midhat Drljević Stadium	1,500
Iskra	Bugojno	Jaklić Stadium	11,000
Jedinstvo	Bihać	Pod Borićima Stadium	7,500
Krajina	Cazin	Gradski Stadion, Cazin	6,000
Krajišnik	Velika Kladuša	Gradski Stadion, Velika Kladuša	5,628
Podgrmeč	Sanski Most	Gradski Stadion, Sanski Most	1,500
Radnički	Lukavac	Jošik Stadium	2,000
Rudar	Kakanj	FK Rudar Stadium	4,568
Sloboda	Tuzla	Tušanj Stadium	8,444
Troglav	Livno	Zgona Stadium	2,000
Vitez	Vitez	Gradski Stadion, Vitez	3,000

=== Personnel and kits ===
Note: Flags indicate national team as has been defined under FIFA eligibility rules. Players may hold more than one non-FIFA nationality.

Team	Manager	Captain	Kit manufacturer	Shirt Sponsor
Bosna	(Bosnia and Herzegovina) Adnan Fočić			
Branitelj	(Bosnia and Herzegovina) Feđa Kulagić			
Bratstvo	(Bosnia and Herzegovina) Nusret Muslimović			
Budućnost	(Bosnia and Herzegovina) Munever Rizvić			
Čapljina	(Bosnia and Herzegovina) Zlatko Križanović			
Goražde	(Bosnia and Herzegovina) Fahrudin Čulov			
Iskra	(Bosnia and Herzegovina) Salim Duraković			
Jedinstvo	(Bosnia and Herzegovina) Nermin Karač			
Krajina	(Bosnia and Herzegovina) Muhamed Berberović			
Krajišnik	(Bosnia and Herzegovina) Fahrudin Šehić			
Podgrmeč	(Bosnia and Herzegovina) Benjamin Ključanin			
Radnički	(Bosnia and Herzegovina) Darko Vojvodić			
Rudar	(Bosnia and Herzegovina) Kemal Hafizović			
Sloboda	(Bosnia and Herzegovina) Abdulah Ibraković			
Troglav	(Bosnia and Herzegovina) Žarko Mandić	(Bosnia and Herzegovina) Božo Crnjak	Diadora	
Vitez	(Bosnia and Herzegovina) Valentin Plavčić			

=== Managerial changes ===
Team	Outgoing manager	Manner of departure	Date of vacancy	Position in table	Replaced by	Date of appointment
Radnički	Smajil Karić	Sacked	9 September 2012	15	Darko Vojdović	19 September 2012

== League table ==
Pos	Team	Pld	W	D	L	GF	GA	GD	Pts	Promotion or relegation
1	Vitez (C)	28	16	7	5	54	24	+30	55	Promotion to Premijer liga BiH
2	Radnički Lukavac	28	12	9	7	40	29	+11	45	
3	Branitelj	28	13	5	10	43	41	+2	44	
4	Rudar Kakanj	28	12	6	10	32	25	+7	42	
5	Bratstvo Gračanica	28	12	6	10	34	28	+6	42	
6	Sloboda Tuzla	28	13	2	13	40	27	+13	41	
7	Jedinstvo Bihać	28	12	5	11	45	33	+12	41	
8	Čapljina	28	12	5	11	36	45	−9	41	
9	Iskra	28	10	7	11	32	33	−1	37	
10	Budućnost	28	10	6	12	36	35	+1	36	
11	Podgrmeč	28	10	6	12	29	43	−14	36	
12	Troglav	28	9	7	12	30	37	−7	34	
13	Bosna Visoko (R)	28	9	6	13	28	37	−9	33	Relegation to Second League FBiH
14	Goražde (R)	28	9	5	14	35	46	−11	32	Relegation to Second League FBiH
15	Krajina (R)	28	8	4	16	25	56	−31	28	Relegation to Second League FBiH
16	Krajišnik (R)	0	0	0	0	0	0	0	0	Relegation to Second League FBiH

Source: SportSport.ba (in Bosnian)
Rules for classification: 1st points; 2nd goal difference; 3rd goals scored
For deciding champions, qualification to higher rank and relegation: 1st points; 2nd head-to-head points; 3rd head-to-head goal difference; 4th head-to-head goals scored; 5th head-to-head away goals scored; 6th goal difference; 7th goals scored
(C) Champions; (R) Relegated

== Results ==
Home \ Away	BOV	BRA	BRT	BUD	ČAP	GOR	ISK	JED	KRA	KRŠ	POD	RAL	RKA	SLO	TRO	VIT
Bosna Visoko		2–2	3–0	2–0	1–1	1–0	1–1	0–1	2–0	1–0	1–0	2–1	1–2	2–2	2–1	0–0
Branitelj	2–1		1–0	2–1	2–1	4–2	0–0	2–1	7–0	7–2	3–0	1–0	1–0	1–0	1–0	1–3
Bratstvo Gračanica	3–0	6–0		2–0	2–0	1–1	1–0	1–2	0–0	3–0	3–1	0–0	1–0	1–0	2–0	0–3
Budućnost	1–0	1–1	3–3		2–0	5–2	1–0	3–0	2–1	3–0	0–1	2–1	3–0	0–2	2–0	2–4
Čapljina	1–0	4–3	1–0	0–0		2–1	2–1	3–2	2–0	6–0	2–1	2–2	3–0	3–0	1–0	2–1
Goražde	0–0	1–0	0–0	2–1	4–0		3–2	0–0	2–0	3–0	3–1	0–2	2–0	0–1	2–3	3–2
Iskra	2–1	2–1	0–1	1–0	3–1	0–0		2–1	3–0	3–0	1–1	1–1	2–0	1–0	2–0	0–0
Jedinstvo Bihać	1–2	2–1	2–1	1–1	1–1	2–0	2–0		6–0	4–1	5–1	6–1	0–0	2–1	2–0	1–1
Krajina	0–1	2–0	0–3	1–1	2–1	3–2	2–2	2–1		2–1	2–1	1–2	2–0	2–0	1–0	1–2
Krajišnik	0–3	0–3	0–2	0–1	0–3	0–3	2–1	0–3	0–3		2–3	0–2	1–3	0–3	2–4	0–3
Podgrmeč	2–1	1–1	1–2	2–1	1–0	2–1	2–1	1–0	2–1	3–0		0–1	0–0	1–0	1–1	2–0
Radnički Lukavac	4–0	3–0	0–0	3–1	4–1	1–2	4–3	1–0	4–0	3–0	0–0		1–0	1–0	1–1	2–2
Rudar Kakanj	2–0	1–1	6–1	1–1	2–1	2–0	3–0	3–1	1–0	3–0	2–0	0–0		0–1	2–0	0–0
Sloboda Tuzla	2–0	1–3	1–0	0–1	1–1	4–1	4–0	3–1	4–0	3–1	4–0	1–0	0–2		5–0	3–2
Troglav	2–1	2–1	2–0	1–0	5–0	3–1	0–2	1–2	0–0	3–0	2–2	0–0	3–2	1–0		2–2
Vitez	4–1	4–1	1–0	2–1	4–0	4–0	1–0	1–0	3–1	6–0	4–0	3–0	0–1	1–0	0–0	

Updated to match(es) played on 8 June 2013. Source: SportSport.ba
Legend: Blue = home team win; Yellow = draw; Red = away team win.

=== Clubs season-progress ===
Team ╲ Round	1	2	3	4	5	6	7	8	9	10	11	12	13	14	15	16	17	18	19	20	21	22	23	24	25	26	27	28	29	30
Bosna Visoko	L	W	L	D	W	W	L	W	L	W	W	L	W	L	L	D	L	D	L	W	W	W	D	W	L	L	D	L	D	L
Branitelj	W	L	W	W	L	W	W	D	L	W	D	W	L	W	D	L	W	L	D	L	L	W	L	W	W	W	L	W	D	W
Bratstvo Gračanica	D	W	W	D	W	W	D	L	W	W	W	L	W	L	L	D	L	W	W	W	D	D	L	L	W	L	W	L	W	L
Budućnost	L	W	W	D	W	L	W	L	W	L	D	D	L	L	L	W	D	W	W	L	D	L	L	D	W	L	W	L	W	W
Čapljina	L	W	L	D	D	W	L	W	L	W	L	W	L	D	W	W	L	W	L	W	L	W	W	D	L	W	D	W	L	L
Goražde	L	W	L	W	L	L	D	L	W	L	L	L	W	L	L	L	D	W	W	W	D	D	D	L	W	L	W	L	W	W
Iskra	W	L	L	D	D	L	W	D	W	L	D	L	W	W	L	L	D	L	W	L	W	W	W	L	D	L	W	L	D	W
Jedinstvo Bihać	W	W	L	D	L	W	L	W	L	L	L	W	L	D	L	W	W	W	L	D	D	D	W	W	W	W	L	W	W	W
Krajina	W	L	W	D	L	L	W	D	W	L	L	L	W	L	W	D	D	L	L	L	W	L	W	L	W	L	L	L	D	L
Krajišnik	L	L	L	L	L	L	L	L	L	L	L	L	L	L	W	L	L	L	L	L	L	L	L	L	L	L	L	L	L	L
Podgrmeč	L	W	D	W	D	W	W	W	L	L	L	L	W	D	D	D	L	L	L	W	L	W	W	W	L	W	W	L	D	L
Radnički Lukavac	D	L	D	D	D	L	W	L	W	W	D	W	W	W	W	D	W	W	W	D	W	D	D	L	L	W	W	W	L	L
Rudar Kakanj	W	L	W	L	W	D	L	L	L	W	W	D	L	W	W	D	W	L	D	D	W	D	W	W	L	W	L	W	L	W
Sloboda Tuzla	W	L	W	L	D	L	L	W	W	L	W	W	L	W	W	W	W	D	W	L	W	L	L	L	W	L	L	W	W	L
Troglav	L	W	L	D	D	W	L	D	W	W	W	W	L	D	L	L	L	W	D	D	L	L	L	W	L	W	L	W	D	W
Vitez	W	L	W	D	W	D	W	W	L	W	W	W	W	W	W	D	W	L	D	W	L	D	D	W	D	W	W	W	L	W

Source: SportSport.ba
W = Win; D = Draw; L = Lose

== Season statistics ==
=== Transfers ===
For the list of transfers involving First League clubs during 2012–13 season, please see: List of Bosnia and Herzegovina football transfers summer 2012 and List of Bosnia and Herzegovina football transfers winter 2012–13.

=== Top goalscorers ===
Updated 23 March 2013.

Rank	Player	Club	Goals
1	(Bosnia and Herzegovina) Haris Dilaver	Vitez	10
1	(Bosnia and Herzegovina) Ante Pinjuh	Branitelj	10
3	(Bosnia and Herzegovina) Elvis Mešić	Jedinstvo	9
3	(Croatia) Darijo Pranjković	Vitez	9
5	(Bosnia and Herzegovina) Muhamed Mujić	Budućnost	8

=== Hat-tricks ===
Updated 23 March 2013.

Player	For	Against	Result	Date
(Bosnia and Herzegovina) Haris Dilaver	Vitez	Bosna	4–1	11 August 2012
(Bosnia and Herzegovina) Ante Pinjuh	Branitelj	Krajišnik	7–2	24 October 2012
(Bosnia and Herzegovina) Jasmin Mujkić	Bratstvo	Branitelj	6–0	3 November 2012
(Bosnia and Herzegovina) Mirza Rizvanović	Bratstvo	Branitelj	6–0	3 November 2012
(Bosnia and Herzegovina) Bajro Spahić	Rudar	Bratstvo	6–1	10 November 2012

== See also ==
- 2011–12 First League of the Federation of Bosnia and Herzegovina
- 2012–13 Second League of the Federation of Bosnia and Herzegovina
- 2012–13 First League of the Republika Srpska
- 2012–13 Premier League of Bosnia and Herzegovina
- 2012–13 Bosnia and Herzegovina Football Cup
- Football Federation of Bosnia and Herzegovina
