= 2018–19 First League of the Federation of Bosnia and Herzegovina =

First League of the Federation of Bosnia and Herzegovina
- Season: 2018–19
- Champions: Velež Mostar
- Promoted: Velež Mostar
- Relegated: Vitez; Novi Travnik; Bosna Visoko
- Matches: 240
- Goals: 627 (2.61 per match)
- Top goalscorer: Nusmir Fajić (28 goals)
- Biggest home win: Velež Mostar 7–0 Zvijezda Gradačac (15 September 2018)
- Biggest away win: Zvijezda Gradačac 1–6 Rudar Kakanj (17 November 2018)
- Highest scoring: Bratstvo Gračanica 5–3 Metalleghe-BSI (13 October 2018)
- Longest winning run: 9 matches Velež Mostar
- Longest unbeaten run: 19 matches Olimpik
- Longest winless run: 18 matches Bosna Visoko
- Longest losing run: 11 matches Bosna Visoko

The 2018–19 First League of the Federation of Bosnia and Herzegovina was the 19th season of the First League of the Federation of Bosnia and Herzegovina, the second tier league football in Bosnia and Herzegovina. It began on 11 August 2018 and got concluded on 2 June 2019.

Velež Mostar were crowned champions, winning their second championship title and earning promotion to the Premier League of Bosnia and Herzegovina.

== Teams ==
Location of clubs in 2018–19 First League of the FBiH

Team	Location	Stadium	Capacity
Bosna	Visoko	Luke Stadium, Visoko	5,200
Bratstvo	Gračanica	Gradski Stadion Luke, Gračanica	3,000
Čapljina	Čapljina	Bjelave Stadium	3,000
Goražde	Goražde	Midhat Drljević Stadium	1,500
Igman	Konjic	Gradski Stadion, Konjic	5,000
Jedinstvo	Bihać	Pod Borićima Stadium	7,500
Metalleghe-BSI	Jajce	Mračaj Stadium	3,000
Novi Travnik	Novi Travnik	Gradski Stadion, Novi Travnik	1,000
Olimpik	Sarajevo	Otoka Stadium	3,000
Orašje	Orašje	Gradski Stadion, Orašje	4,000
Rudar	Kakanj	FK Rudar Stadium	4,568
Slaven	Živinice	Gradski Stadion, Živinice	500
TOŠK	Tešanj	Luke Stadium, Tešanj	7,000
Velež	Mostar	Stadion Rođeni	5,200
Vitez	Vitez	Gradski Stadium (Vitez)	3,000
Zvijezda	Gradačac	Banja Ilidža	8,000

== League table ==
Pos	Team	Pld	W	D	L	GF	GA	GD	Pts	Promotion or relegation
1	Velež Mostar (C, P)	30	24	4	2	78	18	+60	76	Promotion to the Premijer Liga BiH
2	Olimpik	30	21	6	3	58	18	+40	69	
3	TOŠK Tešanj	30	13	6	11	46	43	+3	45	
4	Goražde	30	13	5	12	48	36	+12	44	
5	Zvijezda Gradačac	30	13	5	12	44	43	+1	44	
6	Orašje	30	12	8	10	37	36	+1	44	
7	Rudar Kakanj	30	13	4	13	51	49	+2	43	
8	Jedinstvo Bihać	30	13	4	13	31	41	−10	43	
9	Metalleghe-BSI	30	12	6	12	39	38	+1	42	
10	Bratstvo Gračanica	30	13	3	14	31	37	−6	42	
11	Čapljina	30	13	3	14	39	51	−12	42	
12	Slaven Živinice	30	13	2	15	41	41	0	41	
13	Igman	30	11	7	12	29	27	+2	40	
14	Vitez (R)	30	9	7	14	28	41	−13	34	Relegation to the Second League of FBiH
15	Novi Travnik (R)	30	4	7	19	20	55	−35	19	Relegation to the Second League of FBiH
16	Bosna Visoko (R)	30	3	3	24	16	68	−52	12	Relegation to the Second League of FBiH

Source: NS FBiH
Rules for classification: 1) Points; 2) Head-to-head points; 3) Head-to-head goal difference; 4) Head-to-head goals scored; 5) Head-to-head away goals scored (only if two teams); 6) Goal difference; 7) Goals scored; 8) Play-off.
(C) Champions; (P) Promoted; (R) Relegated

== Results ==
Home \ Away	BOV	BRT	ČAP	GOR	IGM	JED	MET	NTR	OLI	ORA	RKA	SŽI	TTE	VEL	VIT	ZVI
Bosna Visoko		1–4	1–4	0–1	0–2	0–0	1–5	1–0	1–2	0–1	1–2	1–1	1–0	0–2	0–1	1–0
Bratstvo Gračanica	4–0		1–2	1–0	2–0	1–2	5–3	3–2	1–0	1–2	2–0	1–0	0–1	0–3	2–0	1–0
Čapljina	5–2	0–0		4–3	0–0	0–1	2–1	2–0	1–3	1–0	2–4	3–1	1–0	1–4	0–1	2–0
Goražde	4–0	1–0	3–0		0–2	6–1	1–0	5–0	0–3	4–0	0–0	3–1	0–0	1–0	3–1	3–0
Igman	3–0	1–1	1–0	2–0		1–0	0–1	2–0	0–1	1–1	2–1	3–0	3–0	0–1	1–0	0–0
Jedinstvo Bihać	1–0	1–0	0–2	2–1	3–1		1–0	1–0	1–2	0–0	1–2	1–0	2–0	1–3	3–0	3–0
Metalleghe-BSI	2–1	0–0	3–1	2–1	0–0	2–2		1–1	0–1	1–2	2–1	2–0	2–1	0–1	1–0	1–0
Novi Travnik	1–0	1–2	0–1	0–1	1–1	2–2	0–3		0–2	1–1	2–2	2–1	2–1	0–2	1–1	0–1
Olimpik	2–0	3–0	4–1	3–0	3–1	2–0	3–0	2–2		1–0	3–1	4–0	6–1	2–2	2–0	1–1
Orašje	3–0	0–1	3–1	2–2	0–0	2–0	1–0	1–0	3–1		3–1	2–1	1–1	1–3	3–3	0–1
Rudar Kakanj	2–2	4–1	2–0	0–2	3–0	2–1	0–3	0–1	0–1	3–1		1–0	3–2	1–3	1–1	3–2
Slaven Živinice	1–0	1–0	3–1	1–0	1–0	0–1	6–0	2–0	2–0	1–0	4–0		1–0	2–3	1–0	3–3
TOŠK	2–1	3–1	3–0	2–2	1–0	4–0	3–2	5–1	0–0	2–1	2–1	3–2		0–0	2–0	1–1
Velež	5–1	3–1	4–0	3–1	4–2	2–0	0–0	5–0	0–0	3–0	4–0	2–0	5–3		1–0	7–0
Vitez	2–0	1–0	0–0	1–2	1–0	3–0	0–0	2–0	0–0	1–2	0–4	4–3	1–3	0–3		2–1
Zvijezda	5–0	2–0	5–0	2–0	2–1	3–0	3–2	2–0	0–1	1–1	1–6	1–2	3–0	1–0	2–1	

Source: NS FBiH
Legend: Blue = home team win; Yellow = draw; Red = away team win.

== Top goalscorers ==
Rank	Player	Club	Goals
1	(Bosnia and Herzegovina) Nusmir Fajić	Velež	28
2	(Bosnia and Herzegovina) Mirnes Salihović	Slaven	22
3	(Bosnia and Herzegovina) Adnan Osmanović	Olimpik	14
3	(Brazil) Brandao	Velež	14
3	(Bosnia and Herzegovina) Dženan Haračić	Metalleghe-BSI	14
4	(Bosnia and Herzegovina) Dario Blagojević	Goražde	13
5	(Bosnia and Herzegovina) Salko Jazvin	Čapljina	10

== See also ==
- 2018–19 Premier League of Bosnia and Herzegovina
- 2018–19 First League of the Republika Srpska
- 2018–19 Bosnia and Herzegovina Football Cup
