= Kenan Hasagić =

Bosnian footballer (born 1980)

Personal information
- Date of birth: 1 February 1980 (age 46)
- Place of birth: Kakanj, SFR Yugoslavia
- Height: 1.86 m (6 ft 1 in)
- Position: Goalkeeper

Team information
- Current team: Željezničar (goalkeeping coach)

Youth career
- 1994–1997: Rudar Kakanj

Senior career*
| Years | Team | Apps | (Gls) |
| 1997–1998 | Rudar Kakanj | 14 | (0) |
| 1998–1999 | Vorwärts Steyr | 21 | (0) |
| 1999–2001 | Altay | 42 | (0) |
| 2001 | Bosna Visoko | 8 | (0) |
| 2002 | Rudar Kakanj | 11 | (0) |
| 2002–2004 | Željezničar | 55 | (0) |
| 2004–2007 | Gaziantepspor | 76 | (0) |
| 2007–2012 | İstanbul Başakşehir | 84 | (0) |
| Total | | 311 | (0) |

International career
| 2003–2011 | Bosnia and Herzegovina | 44 | (0) |

Managerial career
- 2017–2019: Mladost Doboj Kakanj (goalkeeping coach)
- 2018–2019: Bosnia and Herzegovina (goalkeeping coach)
- 2020–2021: Tuzla City (goalkeeping coach)
- 2021–2024: Željezničar (goalkeeping coach)
- 2024–2026: Bosnia and Herzegovina (goalkeeping coach)
- 2026–: Željezničar (goalkeeping coach)
- * Club domestic league appearances and goals

Kenan Hasagić (Bosnian pronunciation: [xâsaɡitɕ]; born 1 February 1980) is a Bosnian former professional football goalkeeper and current goalkeeping coach of Bosnian Premier League club Željezničar.

== Club career ==
Hasagić's football career began in his hometown with Rudar Kakanj. At the age of 16, he made his debut in a first division match. He conceded 5 goals. He was the most promising goalkeeper in Bosnia and Herzegovina, he played for youth selections and was later transferred to Austrian side Vorwärts Steyr.

After that, Hasagić was a member of Altay in Turkey but didn't see much first team football. He went back to Bosnia and played for Rudar Kakanj and Bosna Visoko. In 2003, he signed a contract with Željezničar. Here he found good form and even became first choice goalkeeper for the Bosnia and Herzegovina national team.

During the 2004–05 season, he moved to Turkey once again where he signed for Turkish Süper Lig side Gaziantepspor. In 2007, he moved over to another Turkish Süper Lig side in İstanbul Başakşehir. In 2012, Hasagić retired from football early after injuries shattered his career.

== International career ==
Hasagić made his debut for Bosnia and Herzegovina in a September 2002 European Championship qualification match against Romania and has earned a total of 44 caps, scoring no goals. His final international was an October 2011 European Championship qualification match against France.

== Coaching career ==
In August 2017, Hasagić became the new goalkeeping coach of Bosnian Premier League club Mladost Doboj Kakanj. Two years later, on 2 November 2019, he announced that he left Mladost and that he will only be focusing on the Bosnia and Herzegovina national team.

On 4 January 2018, after Robert Prosinečki was named the new head coach of the Bosnia and Herzegovina national team, it was announced that Hasagić became the new goalkeeping coach of the national team. Hasagić left the national team in November 2019 with the sacking of Prosinečki.

It was announced on 7 January 2020 that Hasagić took over the position of goalkeeping coach of another Bosnian Premier League club, Tuzla City, working alongside former national team teammate and godfather Elvir Baljić, the club manager at the time. He decided to leave the club in June 2021.

On 9 July 2021, Hasagić became the new goalkeeping coach of his former club Željezničar. He left the club by mutual consent in April 2024.

In May 2024, Hasagić returned to the Bosnian national team to work as a goalkeeping coach within the staff of newly appointed head coach Sergej Barbarez. In March 2026, he additionally started working as a goalkeeping coach again at Željezničar.

== Personal life ==
In 1998, Hasagić met his future wife, Dijana, in Jablanica. They were married in 2000. They have three daughters together: Ilda, Iman and Inam. On 27 December 2009, Hasagić confirmed he divorced his wife Dijana after 9 years of marriage.

After his divorce, he has been in a long-term relationship with a model, Aminka Sivac. He is 15 years older than her. On 8 July 2019, Hasagić married Sivac. Former national team teammate Elvir Baljić was the best man at his wedding.

== Career statistics ==
Appearances and goals by national team and year
| National team | Year | Apps | Goals |
|---|---|---|---|
| Bosnia and Herzegovina | 2002 | 1 | 0 |
| Bosnia and Herzegovina | 2003 | 7 | 0 |
| Bosnia and Herzegovina | 2004 | 2 | 0 |
| Bosnia and Herzegovina | 2005 | 7 | 0 |
| Bosnia and Herzegovina | 2006 | 6 | 0 |
| Bosnia and Herzegovina | 2008 | 5 | 0 |
| Bosnia and Herzegovina | 2009 | 3 | 0 |
| Bosnia and Herzegovina | 2010 | 6 | 0 |
| Bosnia and Herzegovina | 2011 | 7 | 0 |
| Total | | 44 | 0 |

== Honours ==
=== Player ===
Željezničar

- Bosnian Cup: 2002–03
