= 2025–26 First League of the Federation of Bosnia and Herzegovina =

First League of the Federation of Bosnia and Herzegovina
- Season: 2025–26
- Dates: 23 August 2025 – 7 June 2026
- Champions: Čelik
- Promoted: Čelik
- Relegated: Tuzla City
- Matches: 182
- Goals: 466 (2.56 per match)
- Top goalscorer: Anes Mašić (17 goals)
- Biggest home win: Tomislav 5–0 Igman (20 September 2025); Čelik 5–0 Tuzla City (25 October 2025); Čelik 5–0 Jedinstvo (25 April 2026)
- Biggest away win: Igman 1–5 TOŠK (27 September 2025)
- Highest scoring: Travnik 5–1 Tomislav (13 September 2025); Igman 1–5 TOŠK (27 September 2025)
- Longest winning run: Čelik (6 matches)
- Longest unbeaten run: Čelik (18 matches)
- Longest winless run: Tuzla City (10 matches)
- Longest losing run: Tuzla City (6 matches)

The 2025–26 First League of the Federation of Bosnia and Herzegovina (known as the Wwin First League for sponsorship reasons) was the 26th season of the First League of the Federation of Bosnia and Herzegovina, the second tier football league of Bosnia and Herzegovina. The season began on 23 August 2025 and ended on 7 June 2026.

Čelik Zenica were crowned champions, winning their first championship title and earning promotion to the Premier League of Bosnia and Herzegovina.

== Teams ==
Team	Location	Stadium	Capacity
Bratstvo	Gračanica	Gradski Stadion Luke, Gračanica	3,000
Budućnost	Banovići	Stadion FK Budućnost	8,500
Čelik	Zenica	Bilino Polje Stadium	13,694
GOŠK	Gabela	Stadium Perica-Pero Pavlović	3,000
Igman	Konjic	Konjic City Stadium	5,000
Jedinstvo	Bihać	Stadion pod Borićima	7,504
Radnik	Hadžići	Gradski Stadion, Hadžići	500
Sloboda	Tuzla	Tušanj City Stadium	7,200
Stupčanica	Olovo	Danac Stadium	1,500
Tomislav	Tomislavgrad	Gradski stadion, Tomislav	2,000
TOŠK	Tešanj	Luke Stadium, Tešanj	7,000
Travnik	Travnik	Pirota Stadium	4,000
Tuzla City	Tuzla	Tušanj City Stadium	7,200
Vitez	Vitez	Vitez City Stadium	3,500

== League table ==
Pos	Team	Pld	W	D	L	GF	GA	GD	Pts	Promotion or relegation
1	Čelik Zenica (C, P)	26	17	8	1	52	19	+33	59	Promotion to the Premijer Liga BiH
2	Stupčanica	26	12	5	9	40	27	+13	41	
3	Sloboda	26	12	5	9	34	29	+5	41	
4	Jedinstvo	26	12	5	9	29	36	−7	41	
5	GOŠK	26	11	7	8	36	26	+10	40	
6	Travnik	26	10	7	9	35	26	+9	37	
7	TOŠK Tešanj	26	10	7	9	35	30	+5	37	
8	Radnik Hadžići	26	10	6	10	34	37	−3	36	
9	Tomislav	26	8	8	10	38	35	+3	32	
10	Igman	26	9	5	12	29	44	−15	32	
11	Budućnost	26	8	7	11	31	33	−2	31	
12	Bratstvo Gračanica	26	7	10	9	26	28	−2	31	
13	Vitez	26	8	4	14	27	38	−11	28	
14	Tuzla City (R)	26	5	2	19	20	58	−38	17	Relegation to the Second League of FBiH

Source: rezultati.com
Rules for classification: 1) Points; 2) Head-to-head points; 3) Head-to-head goal difference; 4) Head-to-head goals scored; 5) Head-to-head away goals scored (only if two teams); 6) Goal difference; 7) Goals scored; 8) Play-off.
(C) Champions; (P) Promoted; (R) Relegated

== Top goalscorers ==
Rank	Player	Club	Goals
1	(Bosnia and Herzegovina) Anes Mašić	Čelik	17
2	(Bosnia and Herzegovina) Esmir Hasukić	GOŠK	13
3	(Bosnia and Herzegovina) Anel Husić	Budućnost	11
4	(Bosnia and Herzegovina) Eldin Mehmedović	Stupčanica	10
5	(Bosnia and Herzegovina) Dževad Sijamija	Čelik	9
5	(Bosnia and Herzegovina) Sadik Škrijelj	TOŠK Tešanj	9
7	(Croatia) Petar Banović	Tomislav	8
7	(Bosnia and Herzegovina) Haris Dilaver	Vitez	8
7	(Netherlands) Bujazid Hegić	TOŠK Tešanj	8
7	(Bosnia and Herzegovina) Nihad Šero	Čelik	8

== See also ==
- 2025–26 Premier League of Bosnia and Herzegovina
- 2025–26 First League of the Republika Srpska
- 2025–26 Bosnia and Herzegovina Football Cup
