= Zukanović =

Zukanović (Bosnian pronunciation: [zukǎːnoʋitɕ]) is a Bosnian surname. Notable people with the surname include:

- Ervin Zukanović (born 1987), Bosnian footballer
- Ibrahim Zukanović (born 1957), Bosnian footballer
- Miloš Zukanović (born 1996), Serbian footballer
