= 2005–06 First League of the Federation of Bosnia and Herzegovina =

The 2005–06 First League of the Federation of Bosnia and Herzegovina season was the sixth since its establishment.

== League standings ==
Pos	Team	Pld	W	D	L	GF	GA	GD	Pts	Promotion or relegation
1	Velež Mostar (C, P)	30	19	7	4	52	21	+31	64	Promotion to Premijer liga BiH
2	Rudar Kakanj	30	15	5	10	48	27	+21	50	
3	Brotnjo	30	15	3	12	58	33	+25	48	
4	MIS Kreševo	30	15	3	12	42	41	+1	48	
5	SAŠK Napredak	30	14	5	11	38	23	+15	47	
6	Troglav Livno	30	13	8	9	45	42	+3	47	
7	Gradina Srebrenik	30	14	4	12	56	39	+17	46	
8	GOŠK Gabela	30	14	4	12	37	29	+8	46	
9	Bosna Visoko	30	14	4	12	39	38	+1	46	
10	Mramor	30	15	1	14	30	37	−7	46	
11	Radnički Lukavac	30	14	3	13	29	29	0	45	
12	Vitez FIS (R)	30	12	7	11	33	33	0	43	Relegation to Second League FBiH
13	Iskra Bugojno (R)	30	12	6	12	36	34	+2	42	Relegation to Second League FBiH
14	Podgrmeč (R)	30	9	4	17	31	51	−20	31	Relegation to Second League FBiH
15	Olimpik Sarajevo (R)	30	6	7	17	28	48	−20	25	Relegation to Second League FBiH
16	Sloga Ljubuški (R)	30	3	1	26	9	86	−77	10	Relegation to Second League FBiH

Source: RSSSF.org
Rules for classification: 1) points; 2) goal difference; 3) number of goals scored.
(C) Champions; (P) Promoted; (R) Relegated
