= Elvedin Provalić =

Bosnian footballer

Personal information
- Full name: Elvedin Provalić
- Date of birth: 22 July 1973 (age 53)
- Place of birth: Visoko, SFR Yugoslavia
- Position: Defender

Senior career*
Years	Team	Apps	(Gls)
1996-2009	Bosna Visoko	22	(0)
1997-2001	Rudar Kakanj	106	(0)
2001-2009	Bosna Visoko	20+	(0+)

International career^{‡}
2000	Bosnia and Herzegovina	2	(0)
- * Club domestic league appearances and goals ‡ National team caps and goals as of 19 June 2021

Elvedin Provalić (born 22 July 1973) is a Bosnian retired football player.

== International career ==
Provalić made 2 appearances for Bosnia and Herzegovina, in a March 2000 double bill away against Jordan.

== Post-playing career ==
After retiring as a player, he worked in the private sector. In October 2020 he was candidate for the Democratic Front at the Visoko City Council elections.
