= NK Bosna Visoko =

Association football club in Bosnia and Herzegovina

Bosna Visoko
- Full name: Nogometni klub Bosna Visoko
- Nickname: Faraoni (The Pharaohs)
- Founded: 1953; 73 years ago, after merging Jadran (1923) and Radnički (1934)
- Ground: Stadion Luke, Visoko
- Capacity: 5,200
- Chairman: Nihad Smailagić
- Manager: Eldin Dedić
- League: Second League of FBiH (Center)
- 2024–25: Second League of FBiH (Center), 5th of 16
Home colours	Away colours

Nogometni klub Bosna Visoko (English: Bosna Football Club) is a professional association football club from the city of Visoko that is situated in Bosnia and Herzegovina.

Currently, Bosna plays in the Second League of the Federation of Bosnia and Herzegovina (Group Center) and plays its home matches on Stadion Luke which has a capacity of 5,200 seats.

The club's greatest success was in the late 1990s. Guided by manager Ivo Ištuk, Bosna won the Bosnian Cup, Bosnian Supercup and came close to winning the league title in the 1997–98 season.

== History ==
=== Foundation ===
NK Bosna was founded in 1953 in the city of Visoko with the merging of local sides NK Jadran (1923) and NK Radnički (1934) into a single club. After spending a decade in the third-tier, the club got promoted to the Yugoslav Second League in 1963, which was the club's biggest achievement in the former Yugoslavia. Bosna again got promoted to the second league in 1978 after winning the Bosnia and Herzegovina Republic League. The club stayed in the league for three years, before being relegated in the 1980–81 season.

=== Success and downfall ===
In the 1995–96 (north) Second League of Bosnia and Herzegovina season, Bosna finished on 1st place and got promoted to the First League of Bosnia and Herzegovina.

The club had its biggest success in the late 1990s under the guidance of current manager Ivo Ištuk. In the 1997–98 First League of Bosnia and Herzegovina season, the club finished the first round on 1st place, but did not win the whole league as it succumbed in the group stage play-offs. The next season, Bosna had great success, as it won the 1998–99 Bosnia and Herzegovina Football Cup, the first trophy in the club's history and the next season, won the Bosnian Supercup in 1999.

After years of playing in the First League of Bosnia and Herzegovina, in the 1999–2000 league season, Bosna got relegated to the First League of the Federation of Bosnia and Herzegovina.

In the 2000–01 season, alongside HNK Grude, Bosna got promoted back to the Premier League of Bosnia and Herzegovina. After two seasons of Premier League football, in the 2002–03 season, Bosna finished on last place and got relegated once again to the First League of FBiH.

=== Present ===
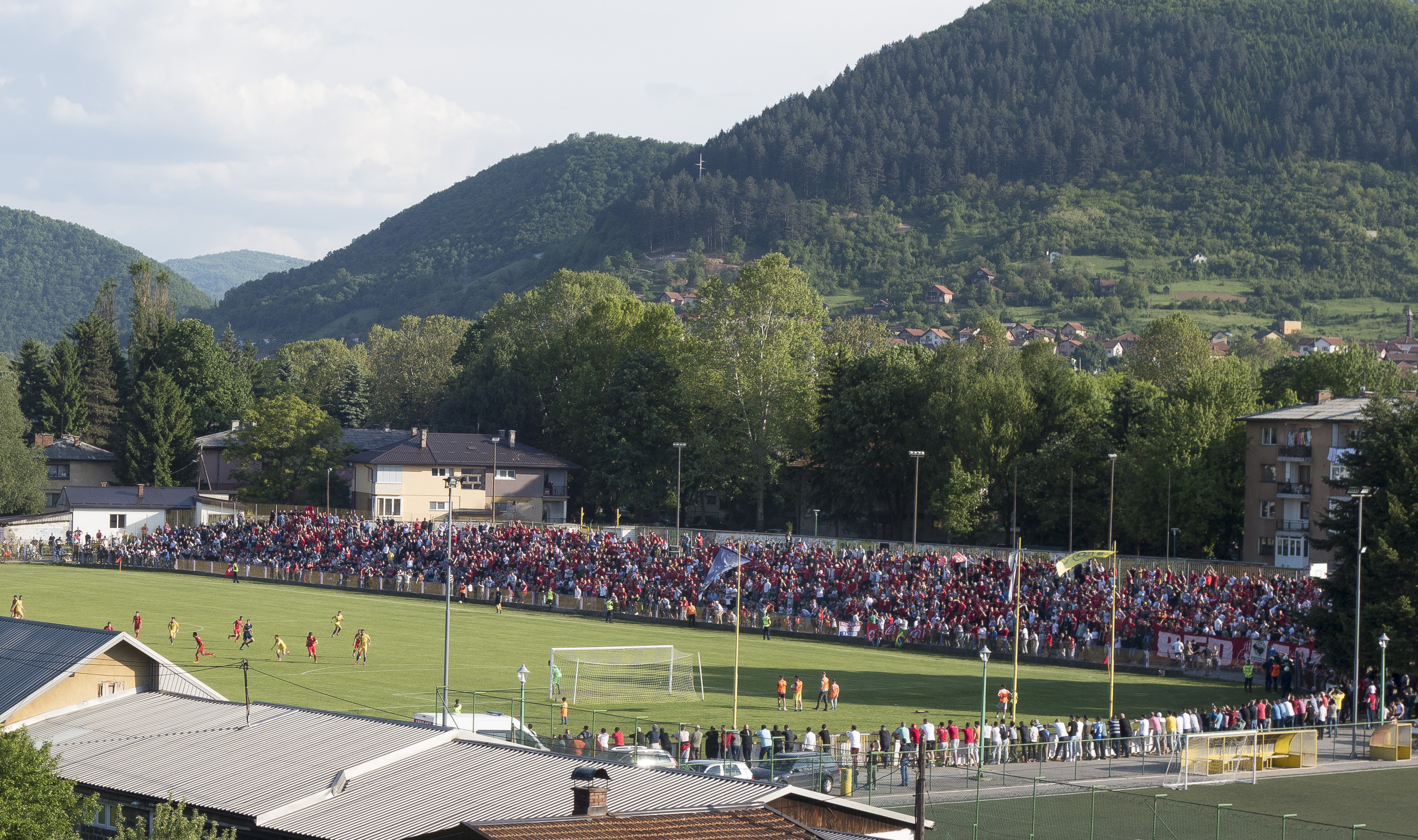
Stadium Luke during a match between Bosna and Velež Mostar.

Since getting relegated from the top tier of Bosnian football again in May 2003, Bosna mostly played in the First League of FBiH, with three seasons of them also playing in the Second League of FBiH (center) (2011–12, 2013–14 and 2014–15) and the fourth (2019–20) season to be played.

For a short period, from January to May 2013, 17 years after leaving Bosna, Ivo Ištuk, the club's most successful manager in history came back to the club and managed the club in that period.

On 5 August 2014, Bosna and FK Sarajevo signed a cooperation agreement by which Sarajevo will loan its talented youngsters to the Visoko-based side and will have first-buy rights on all NK Bosna players. By signing this agreement, Bosna de facto became Sarajevo's farm team. The agreement was signed by Adis Hajlovac and Mirza Laletović on behalf of Bosna, and Abdulah Ibraković on behalf of Sarajevo.

In the 2016–17 First League of FBiH season, Bosna throughout the whole season held 1st place and were really close to coming back to the Bosnian Premier League, but at the end of the season they failed to finish 1st as bad results costed them the promotion. At the end they finished 2nd, six points off champions NK GOŠK Gabela and only two points more than 3rd place FK Tuzla City, at that time still known as FK Sloga Simin Han.

On 5 April 2017, almost four years after leaving the club, Ivo Ištuk once again came back to Bosna and became the new manager. In July 2019, he left the club after over two years as its manager.

In the 2018–19 First League of FBiH season, Bosna for a third time in the club's history got relegated to the Second League of FBiH (center).

== Honours ==
=== Domestic ===
==== League ====
- First League of Bosnia and Herzegovina:
  - Winners (1): 1997–98 (First Round)
- First League of the Federation of Bosnia and Herzegovina:
  - Winners (1): 1995–96 (north)
  - Runners-up (1): 2016–17
- Second League of the Federation of Bosnia and Herzegovina:
  - Winners (2): 2011–12 (center), 2014–15 (center)
- Bosnia and Herzegovina Republic League:
  - Winners (1): 1977–78

==== Cups ====
- Bosnia and Herzegovina Football Cup:
  - Winners (1): 1998–99
  - Runners-up (1): 1999–2000
- Supercup of Bosnia and Herzegovina:
  - Winners (1): 1999

== Club seasons ==
Season	League									Cup	Europe
Season	Division	P	W	D	L	F	A	Pts	Pos	Cup	Europe
1994–95	First League; Jablanica Group	5	2	2	1	6	4	8	2nd		
1994–95	First League; Final Play-off	3	1	0	2	2	3	3	3rd		
1996–97	First League	30	16	6	8	60	29	54	3rd		
1997–98	First League; Bosniaks First League	30	19	3	8	55	28	60	1st	QF	
1997–98	First League; Play-off	2	1	0	1	3	3	3	4th	QF	
1998–99	First League	30	18	2	10	50	21	56	2nd	Winners	
1999–2000	First League	30	10	6	14	34	36	36	12th ↓	2RU	
Current format of Premier League of Bosnia and Herzegovina
2000–01	First League of FBiH	32	21	5	6	69	24	68	2nd ↑	R32	
2001–02	Premier League	30	11	6	13	33	48	39	12th	QF	
2002–03	Premier League	38	4	1	33	28	107	13	20th ↓	R32	
2003–04	First League of FBiH	30	11	6	13	37	47	39	11th		
2004–05	First League of FBiH	30	11	4	15	27	38	37	13th		
2005–06	First League of FBiH	30	14	4	12	39	38	46	9th		
2006–07	First League of FBiH	30	13	2	15	35	42	41	10th	R32	
2007–08	First League of FBiH	30	13	4	13	41	39	43	10th		
2008–09	First League of FBiH	30	15	4	11	47	26	49	3rd		
2009–10	First League of FBiH	30	13	2	13	47	41	41	6th		
2010–11	First League of FBiH	30	12	5	13	39	44	41	13th ↓		
2012–13	First League of FBiH	28	9	6	13	28	37	33	13th ↓		
2015–16	First League of FBiH	30	15	2	13	47	36	47	4th		
2016–17	First League of FBiH	30	15	5	10	39	29	50	2nd		
2017–18	First League of FBiH	30	10	7	13	42	49	37	10th	R32	
2018–19	First League of FBiH	30	3	3	24	16	68	12	16th ↓	R32	
2019–20	Second League of FBiH – Center	15	7	4	4	25	16	25	5th		
2020–21	Second League of FBiH – Center	30	13	8	9	50	41	47	6th		
2021–22	Second League of FBiH – Center	30	21	4	5	69	23	67	2nd		
2022–23	Second League of FBiH – Center	30	20	4	6	63	35	64	2nd		
2023–24	Second League of FBiH – Center	30	11	9	10	49	47	42	5th	R32	
2024–25	Second League of FBiH – Center	30	15	4	11	52	39	49	5th		

== Notable players ==
- (Socialist Federal Republic of Yugoslavia) Slaviša Vukičević
- (Bosnia and Herzegovina) Faruk Ihtijarević
- (Bosnia and Herzegovina) Almedin Hota
- (Bosnia and Herzegovina) Elvir Rahimić
- (Bosnia and Herzegovina) Mirsad Bešlija
- (Bosnia and Herzegovina) Esmir Džafić
- (Bosnia and Herzegovina) Kenan Hasagić

== Managerial history ==
- (Socialist Federal Republic of Yugoslavia) Rajko Rašević (1977–1980)
- (Bosnia and Herzegovina) Ivo Ištuk (June 1997 – January 2000)
- (Bosnia and Herzegovina) Faruk Kulović (1 July 2000 – 30 June 2004)
- (Bosnia and Herzegovina) Nermin Bukva (1 July 2007 – 30 June 2008)
- (Bosnia and Herzegovina) Jusuf Čizmić (1 July 2008 – 21 June 2009)
- (Bosnia and Herzegovina) Avdo Kurdija (21 June 2009 – 14 July 2011)
- (Bosnia and Herzegovina) Adnan Fočić (14 July 2011 – 28 January 2013)
- (Bosnia and Herzegovina) Ivo Ištuk (29 January 2013 – 12 May 2013)
- (Bosnia and Herzegovina) Avdo Kurdija (13 May 2013 – 30 June 2013)
- (Bosnia and Herzegovina) Emir Karahmet (1 July 2014 – 30 June 2015)
- (Bosnia and Herzegovina) Faruk Dedić (1 July 2015 – 4 April 2017)
- (Bosnia and Herzegovina) Ivo Ištuk (5 April 2017 – 3 July 2019)
- (Bosnia and Herzegovina) Faruk Dedić (3 July 2019 – 30 September 2020)
- (Bosnia and Herzegovina) Faruk Kulović (3 October 2020 – 4 October 2021)
- (Bosnia and Herzegovina) Omer Joldić (15 July 2022 – 15 October 2023)
- (Bosnia and Herzegovina) Esad Selimović (15 October 2023 – 31 December 2023)
- (Bosnia and Herzegovina) Adin Mulaosmanović (3 July 2025 – 15 October 2025)
- (Bosnia and Herzegovina) Eldin Dedić (15 October 2025 – present)

== See also ==
- Football Association of Bosnia and Herzegovina
- FK Sarajevo
