= Adin Mulaosmanović =

Bosnian footballer (born 1977)

Personal information
- Date of birth: 1 January 1977 (age 49)
- Place of birth: Sarajevo, SFR Yugoslavia
- Height: 1.81 m (5 ft 11 in)
- Position: Defender

Senior career*
Years	Team	Apps	(Gls)
1997–2005	Željezničar	157	(25)
2006	Jedinstvo Bihać	12	(3)
2006	Renova	15	(4)
2007	Elbasani	17	(3)
2007–2011	Bratstvo Gračanica	104	(22)
Total		305	(57)

Managerial career
- 2019: Bosnia and Herzegovina U17 (caretaker)
- 2024–2025: Željezničar U19
- 2025: Velež Nevesinje
- 2025: Bosna Visoko
- * Club domestic league appearances and goals

Adin Mulaosmanović (born 1 January 1977) is a Bosnian professional football manager and former player.

== Playing career ==
Born in Sarajevo, Mulaosmanović previously played for hometown club Željezničar, where he won the league title two times, cup three times and the supercup also three times. He also played both 2002–03 UEFA Champions League qualifying round matches against Newcastle United. After seven years of playing for Željezničar, he left the club in 2005 and signed a contract with Jedinstvo Bihać. Mulaosmanović also played in North Macedonia and Albania for Renova and Elbasani, before returning to Bosnia and Herzegovina and joining Bratstvo Gračanica in 2007, where he retired in 2011 at the age of 34.

== Managerial career ==
Mulaosmanović worked as an assistant manager at his former club Željezničar from 2018 to 2022. He was assistant manager during the managing tenures of Milomir Odović, Amar Osim, Blaž Slišković, Tomislav Ivković and Edis Mulalić.

On 31 January 2019, Mulaosmanović was named the new interim head coach of the Bosnia and Herzegovina national U-17 football team. He was sacked on 21 December 2019, and was replaced with Nermin Šabić.

In June 2022, Velež Mostar appointed Mulaosmanović as the club's new assistant manager, following Amar Osim's appointment as manager.

== Honours ==
=== Player ===
Željezničar

- Bosnian First League: 1997–98
- Bosnian Premier League: 2000–01, 2001–02
- Bosnian Cup: 1999–2000, 2000–2001, 2002–03
- Bosnian Supercup: 1998, 2000, 2001

Bratstvo Gračanica

- Second League of FBiH: 2010–11 (North)
