= Igor Radovanović =

Bosnian-Herzegovinian football player (born 1985)

Personal information
- Full name: Igor Radovanović
- Date of birth: 2 August 1985 (age 41)
- Place of birth: Sarajevo, SFR Yugoslavia
- Height: 1.91 m (6 ft 3 in)
- Position: Forward

Youth career
- 1997–2002: Slavija Sarajevo

Senior career*
Years	Team	Apps	(Gls)
2002–2007	Slavija Sarajevo	104	(30)
2007	Pandurii Târgu Jiu	3	(0)
2007–2008	Tienen	10	(2)
2008–2009	Željezničar	11	(2)
2009–2011	Slavija Sarajevo	49	(20)
2011	Ceahlăul Piatra Neamţ	5	(0)
2012	Domžale	12	(1)
2013–2014	Slavija Sarajevo	21	(7)
2014–2015	Sloboda Tuzla	7	(2)
2015	Čelik Zenica	2	(0)
2016	Slavija Sarajevo	9	(0)
2016–2017	Sloga Simin Han		
2017	Ängelholm	3	(0)
2018-2019	Slavija Sarajevo		

International career
2006	Bosnia and Herzegovina U21	1	(0)
- * Club domestic league appearances and goals as of 23 December 2017

Igor Radovanović (born 2 August 1985 in Sarajevo) is a Bosnian-Herzegovinian retired football player.

== Club career ==
After playing for clubs in Romania, Belgium and Slovenia, Radovanović joined Čelik Zenica in July 2015 and returned to his first club Slavija Sarajevo in February 2016. He then had a season with Sloga Simin Han and in summer 2017, he joined Swedish third tier side Ängelholm.
