= Brandao de Souza =

Brazilian footballer (born 1995)

Personal information
- Full name: Ubiratan Brandao de Souza
- Date of birth: 1 November 1995 (age 31)
- Place of birth: Salvador, Bahia, Brazil
- Height: 1.80 m (5 ft 11 in)
- Position: Left winger

Team information
- Current team: Nakhon Ratchasima
- Number: 10

Youth career
- –2016: Galícia

Senior career*
Years	Team	Apps	(Gls)
2016	Associação Araçatuba		
2017–2022	Velež Mostar	151	(48)
2022	Kyzylzhar	5	(0)
2023	Grêmio Prudente	5	(0)
2023–2025	Jedinstvo	62	(6)
2025–	Nakhon Ratchasima	9	(0)
- * Club domestic league appearances and goals as of 31 December 2025

Ubiratan Brandao de Souza (born 1 November 1995) is a Brazilian professional footballer who plays as a left winger, currently at Nakhon Ratchasima.

== Career statistics ==
=== Club ===
As of match played 27 May 2022.

Appearances and goals by club, season and competition
Club	Season	League			Cup		Continental		Total	
Club	Season	Division	Apps	Goals	Apps	Goals	Apps	Goals	Apps	Goals
Velež Mostar	2016–17	First League of FBiH	12	8	—		—		12	8
Velež Mostar	2017–18	First League of FBiH	30	9	1	0	—		31	9
Velež Mostar	2018–19	First League of FBiH	30	14	1	0	—		31	14
Velež Mostar	2019–20	Bosnian Premier League	22	10	0	0	—		22	10
Velež Mostar	2020–21	Bosnian Premier League	30	2	2	0	—		32	2
Velež Mostar	2021–22	Bosnian Premier League	27	5	4	1	6	3	37	9
Velež Mostar	Total		151	48	8	1	6	3	165	52
Career total			151	48	8	1	6	3	165	52

== Honours ==
Velež Mostar

- First League of FBiH: 2018–19
- Bosnian Cup: 2021–22
