= 1998–99 Bosnia and Herzegovina Football Cup =

Tournament details
- Country: Bosnia and Herzegovina

Final positions
- Champions: Bosna Visoko
- Runners-up: Sarajevo

1998–99 Bosnia and Herzegovina Football Cup was the fifth season of the Bosnia and Herzegovina's annual football cup. The Cup was won by Bosna Visoko who defeated Sarajevo in the final.

== Overview ==
Unlike the previous season in this edition there was no agreement between Football Federation of Bosnia and Herzegovina and the Football Federation of Herzeg-Bosnia so that each one organized its own competition.

This was the only one to be recognized by UEFA.

== Quarterfinals ==
Team 1	Agg.	Team 2	1st leg	2nd leg
Travnik	2–4	Bosna Visoko	2–1	0–3
Zmaj od Bosne	0–3	Sarajevo	0–0	0–3
Željezničar	0–0 (4–3 p)	Čelik Zenica	0–0	0–0
Sloboda Tuzla	1–1 (4–2 p)	Zenica	1–0	0–1

== Semifinals ==
Team 1	Agg.	Team 2	1st leg	2nd leg
Sarajevo	1–1 (3–1 p)	Željezničar	1–0	0–1
Sloboda Tuzla	3–3 (3–4 p)	Bosna Visoko	3–0	0–3

== Final ==
29 May 1999

Sarajevo	0–1 (a.e.t.)	Bosna Visoko
	Report	Džafić 114'

Stadion Koševo, Sarajevo
Attendance: 5,000
Referee: Edvin Medić (Bihać)

== See also ==
- 1998–99 First League of Bosnia and Herzegovina
