= NK Iskra Bugojno =

Football club from Bugojno, Bosnia and Herzegovina

NK Iskra
- Full name: Nogometni Klub Iskra Bugojno
- Founded: 1946; 80 years ago
- Ground: Stadion Jaklić
- Capacity: 12,000
- Chairman: Nedžad Šečić
- Manager: Safet Kmetaš
- League: Second League of FBiH (West)
- 2022–2023: Second League of FBiH (West), 1st
Home colours	Away colours

NK Iskra, commonly known as Iskra Bugojno or just Iskra (meaning "spark" in Bosnian) is a professional association football club from the town of Bugojno that is situated in central Bosnia and Herzegovina. Iskra plays its home matches on the Jaklić Stadium which has a capacity of 12,000 seats.

== History ==
Founded in 1946, the club spent most of its history playing in lower Yugoslav divisions. Its greatest success in the Yugoslav period was winning the 1983–84 Yugoslav Second League West division, and participating in the 1984–85 Yugoslav First League, their only top level season during that period. Although they were immediately relegated in the 1984–85 season, they won the 1985 Mitropa Cup.

After the breakup of Yugoslavia, Iskra played several seasons in the Premier League of Bosnia and Herzegovina, but since the 2018–19 season, the club has been playing in the Second League of the Federation of Bosnia and Herzegovina (Group West), one of two third-tier divisions in the country.

== Honours ==
=== Domestic ===
==== League ====
- Yugoslav Second League:
  - Winners (1): 1983–84 (west)
- Second League of Bosnia and Herzegovina:
  - Winners (1): 1997–98 (south)
- Second League of the Federation of Bosnia and Herzegovina:
  - Winners (2): 2006–07 (west), 2016–17 (west)

=== European ===
- Mitropa Cup:
  - Winners (1): 1984–85

== Club seasons ==
Season	League									Cup	Europe
Season	Division	P	W	D	L	F	A	Pts	Pos	Cup	Europe
1994–95	First League of Bosnia and Herzegovina; Jablanica Group	5	1	1	3	4	14	4	6th		
1995–96	First League of Bosnia and Herzegovina; Sarajevo Group	30	4	7	19	16	66	19	16th ↓		
1998–99	First League of Bosnia and Herzegovina	30	8	8	14	29	39	32	13th		
1999–00	First League of Bosnia and Herzegovina	30	10	8	12	33	32	38	10th		
Current format of Premier League of Bosnia and Herzegovina
2000–01	Premier League of Bosnia and Herzegovina	42	17	14	11	55	49	65	9th		
2001–02	Premier League of Bosnia and Herzegovina	30	7	8	15	25	48	29	16th ↓		
2002–03	First League of FBiH	36	19	5	12	68	36	62	3rd		
2003–04	First League of FBiH	30	11	8	11	40	37	41	5th		
2004–05	First League of FBiH	30	12	2	16	42	40	38	11th		
2005–06	First League of FBiH	30	12	6	12	36	34	42	13th ↓		
2006–07	Second League of FBiH – West								1st ↑		
2007–08	First League of FBiH	30	13	5	12	40	33	44	6th		
2008–09	First League of FBiH	30	15	1	14	45	43	46	7th		
2009–10	First League of FBiH	30	16	5	9	56	26	53	3rd		
2010–11	First League of FBiH	30	13	8	9	45	35	47	5th		
2011–12	First League of FBiH	30	14	6	10	42	34	48	7th		
2012–13	First League of FBiH	28	10	7	11	32	33	37	9th		
2013–14	First League of FBiH	30	8	3	19	20	58	27	15th ↓		
2014–15	Second League of FBiH – West										
2015–16	Second League of FBiH – West										
2016–17	Second League of FBiH – West	24	16	4	4	53	17	52	1st ↑		
2017–18	First League of FBiH	30	9	5	16	27	46	32	15th ↓		
2018–19	Second League of FBiH – West	24	13	2	9	47	29	41	3rd		
2019–20	Second League of FBiH – West	14	5	1	8	23	21	16	11th		
2020–21	Second League of FBiH – West I	16	8	3	5	23	21	27	4th		

== Historical list of coaches ==
- (Socialist Federal Republic of Yugoslavia) Blagoje Bratić
- (Socialist Federal Republic of Yugoslavia) Nedeljko Gojković
- (Socialist Federal Republic of Yugoslavia) Milan Ribar
- (Socialist Federal Republic of Yugoslavia) Rajko Rašević (1980–1983)
- (Socialist Federal Republic of Yugoslavia) Franjo Džidić (1988–1990)
- (Bosnia and Herzegovina) Boris Bračulj
- (Croatia) Mesud Duraković
- (Bosnia and Herzegovina) Nedžad Selimović (2011–2012)
- (Bosnia and Herzegovina) Salem Duraković (2012)
- (Bosnia and Herzegovina) Ibrahim Zukanović (2012–2013)
- (Bosnia and Herzegovina) Salem Duraković (2013)
- (Croatia) Mesud Duraković (2013)
- (Bosnia and Herzegovina) Sead Seferović (19 Jul 2013–2014)
- (Bosnia and Herzegovina) Šener Bajramović (2014)
- (Bosnia and Herzegovina) Sead Seferović (2014–2016)
- (Bosnia and Herzegovina) Senid Kulaš (2017)
- (Bosnia and Herzegovina) Salem Duraković (25 Sep 2017–2018)
- (Bosnia and Herzegovina) Adis Obad (9 Apr 2018-2018)
- (Bosnia and Herzegovina) Safet Kmetaš (2018–2019)
