= Faruk Kulović =

Bosnian football manager (born 1961)

Personal information
- Date of birth: 4 October 1961 (age 65)
- Place of birth: Kakanj, SR Bosnia and Herzegovina, SFR Yugoslavia

Senior career*
Years	Team	Apps	(Gls)
1978–1989	Bosna Visoko		

Managerial career
- 1989–1992: Bosna Visoko (youth)
- 1994–1996: Bosna Visoko (assistant)
- 1997–2001: Bosnia and Herzegovina U19 (assistant)
- 2000–2004: Bosna Visoko
- 2005–2008: Kuwait SC (assistant)
- 2007–2008: Kuwait (assistant)
- 2008: Al-Nassr
- 2009–2010: Al-Wahda
- 2010–2011: Al-Seeb
- 2011–2012: Suwaiq Club
- 2013–2014: GOŠK Gabela
- 2015–2016: GOŠK Gabela
- 2016: FK Goražde
- 2017: Olimpik Sarajevo
- 2017–2018: Al-Ahly Shendi
- 2020–2021: Bosna Visoko
- 2024: Bratstvo Gračanica
- 2025–: Ibri Club
- * Club domestic league appearances and goals

Faruk Kulović (born 4 October 1961) is a Bosnian football manager and former football player. He is currently manager of Ibri Club in the Oman Professional League. He has coached clubs in Bosnia and Herzegovina, the Middle East, and Africa.

== Playing career ==
Kulović spent his entire playing career with Bosna Visoko, representing the club from 1978 to 1989. During this period, he competed primarily in the lower tiers of the Yugoslav football league system, most notably in the Yugoslav Third League. He played as a forward. His playing career was derailed in 1987 when he was involved in a serious car accident that kept him off the pitch for two years.

== Coaching career ==
Kulović began his coaching career in the late 1980s as a youth coach. In the 1990s he was an assistant coach of the Bosnia and Herzegovina U19 national team. He later became manager of Bosna Visoko, marking his first senior managerial role.

In the mid-2000s he moved abroad, working as an assistant coach at Kuwait SC and later with the Kuwait national team during the qualification cycle for the 2010 FIFA World Cup.

Kulović subsequently managed several clubs in the Middle East, including Al-Nassr, Al-Wahda, Al-Seeb, and Al-Suwaiq.

After returning to Bosnia and Herzegovina, he coached several clubs in the country's professional leagues, including GOŠK Gabela, FK Goražde, Olimpik Sarajevo, and again Bosna Visoko. He later had additional international appointments, including a spell with Al-Ahly Shendi in Sudan.

In 2025 he was appointed manager of Ibri Club in Oman.
