= Adis Obad =

Bosnia and Herzegovinian footballer (born 1971)

Personal information
- Date of birth: 12 May 1971 (age 55)
- Place of birth: Mostar, SFR Yugoslavia
- Height: 1.75 m (5 ft 9 in)
- Position: Striker

Team information
- Current team: Velež Mostar U17 (manager)

Youth career
- 1988–1992: Lokomotiva Mostar

Senior career*
| Years | Team | Apps | (Gls) |
| 1994–1997 | Velež Mostar | 56 | (25) |
| 1997–1999 | Blagaj | | |
| 2000–2003 | Rot-Weiß Oberhausen | 108 | (23) |
| 2003 | Željezničar | 12 | (2) |
| 2004–2010 | Velež Mostar | 79 | (24) |
| Total | | 255 | (74) |

International career
| 1997–1999 | Bosnia and Herzegovina | 2 | (0) |

Managerial career
- 2011–2012: Velež Mostar (assistant)
- 2012–2013: Lokomotiva Mostar
- 2013–2014: Igman Konjic
- 2015: Blagaj
- 2015: Velež Mostar (caretaker)
- 2015–2017: Blagaj
- 2017–2018: Igman Konjic
- 2018: Iskra Bugojno
- 2018–2019: Velež Mostar U17
- 2022: Jedinstvo Bihać
- 2023–: Velež Mostar U17
- * Club domestic league appearances and goals

Adis Obad (born 12 May 1971) is a Bosnian professional football manager and former player.

== Club career ==
Obad was born in Mostar, SR Bosnia and Herzegovina, Yugoslavia and began his football career with local side FK Velež Mostar.

He also played for FK Blagaj and Rot-Weiß Oberhausen in the German 2. Bundesliga, scoring 23 goals in 108 league matches. The club battled relegation in his final season and he moved back to Bosnia. In 2003 after coming back from Germany, Obad played for FK Željezničar Sarajevo, before coming back to Velež in 2004.

He finished his career playing with Velež Mostar, retiring after sustaining a wrist injury at age of 39 in 2010.

== International career ==
Obad made two appearances for the Bosnia and Herzegovina national team, in friendly games against Tunisia on 5 November 1997 and against Liechtenstein on 18 August 1999.

== Managerial career ==
Obad started off his managerial career in 2011, as an assistant to Mirza Varešanović at FK Velež Mostar. He left the club in April 2012 after Varešanović got sacked.

His first head coach managerial position was in 2012, when he became the new manager of the club he started playing football in, FK Lokomotiva Mostar. In February 2013, Obad decided to leave Lokomotiva.

In July 2013, he was appointed FK Igman Konjic manager. He led the team for one and a half seasons in the First League of the Federation of Bosnia and Herzegovina, before leaving the club due to poor results in September 2014.

In the period between 2015 and 2017, Obad managed FK Blagaj from 2015 to 2017, but before that was caretaker manager of Velež after Dželaludin Muharemović was sacked.

In July 2017, he was once again appointed as the manager of Igman Konjic. In April 2018, he got sacked after making bad results in the league.

Most recently, from April to June 2018, Obad managed Second League of the Federation of Bosnia and Herzegovina - West club NK Iskra Bugojno. On 30 June 2018, Obad left Iskra after failing to keep the club up in the First League of FBiH.

== Managerial statistics ==
As of 2 June 2018

Managerial record by team and tenure
| Team | From | To | Record | | | | |
| Team | From | To | G | W | D | L | Win % |
|---|---|---|---|---|---|---|---|
| Velež Mostar (caretaker) | August 2015 | September 2015 | 3 | 0 | 1 | 2 | 0.00 |
| Igman Konjic | July 2017 | April 2018 | 20 | 6 | 4 | 10 | 30.00 |
| Iskra Bugojno | April 2018 | June 2018 | 9 | 4 | 2 | 3 | 44.44 |
| Total | | | 32 | 10 | 7 | 15 | 31.25 |

== Honours ==
=== Player ===
Velež Mostar

- First League of FBiH: 2005–06
