= Milenko Bošnjaković =

Bosnian football manager (born 1968)

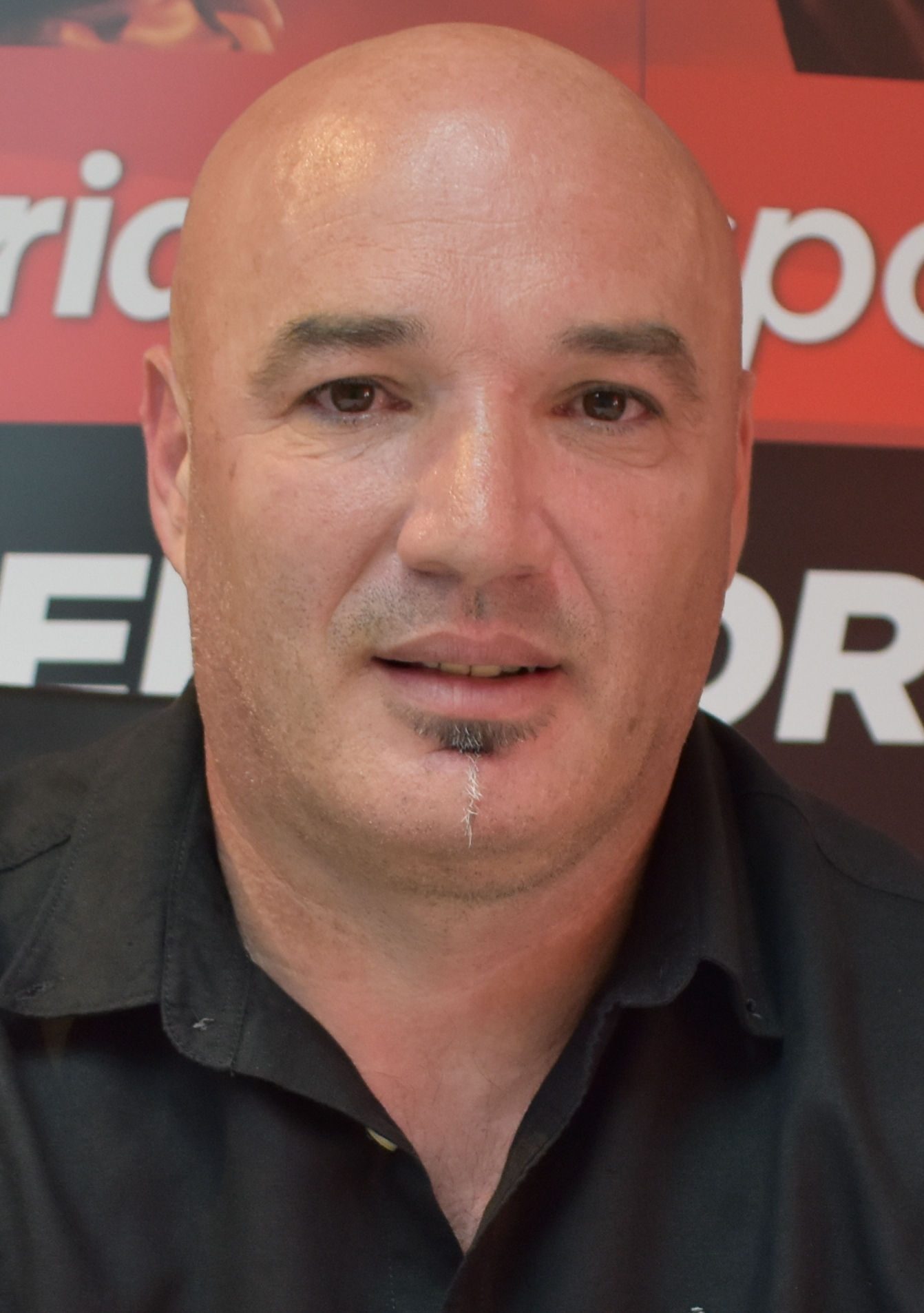
- Bošnjaković in 2021

Personal information
- Date of birth: 4 March 1968 (age 58)
- Place of birth: Tuzla, SFR Yugoslavia

Team information
- Current team: TOŠK Tešanj (manager)

Managerial career
- Years: Team
- 2014–2016: Sloga Simin Han
- 2016–2017: Radnički Lukavac
- 2017–2018: Slaven Živinice
- 2018: Sloboda Tuzla
- 2018–2019: Drina Zvornik
- 2019: Zvijezda 09
- 2019: Tuzla City
- 2019: Sloboda Tuzla
- 2021–2022: Budućnost Banovići
- 2022–2023: Tuzla City
- 2024–2025: Budućnost Banovići
- 2026–: TOŠK Tešanj

Milenko Bošnjaković (born 4 March 1968) is a Bosnian professional football manager. He is the current manager of First League of FBiH club TOŠK Tešanj.

== Managerial statistics ==
As of match played 15 November 2026

Managerial record by team and tenure
Team	From	To	Record							
Team	From	To	G	W	D	L	GF	GA	GD	Win %
Radnički Lukavac	6 December 2016	1 June 2017	14	5	1	8	19	24	−5	35.71
Slaven Živinice	2 September 2017	26 March 2018	13	5	1	7	16	25	−9	38.46
Sloboda Tuzla	8 June 2018	31 July 2018	2	0	1	1	1	2	−1	0.00
Drina Zvornik	13 December 2018	17 March 2019	2	1	1	0	2	1	+1	50.00
Zvijezda 09	18 March 2019	27 May 2019	10	4	3	3	14	13	+1	40.00
Tuzla City	29 May 2019	29 September 2019	12	7	3	2	25	18	+7	58.33
Sloboda Tuzla	18 October 2019	13 December 2019	7	0	4	3	6	13	−7	0.00
Budućnost Banovići	10 August 2021	22 August 2022	32	14	11	7	50	39	+11	43.75
Tuzla City	19 December 2022	29 September 2023	27	9	4	14	42	45	−3	33.33
Budućnost Banovići	26 June 2024	8 September 2025	32	12	8	12	49	44	+5	37.50
TOŠK Tešanj	15 June 2026	Present	15	7	3	5	27	20	+7	46.67
Total			166	64	40	62	251	244	+7	38.55

== Honours ==
=== Manager ===
Tuzla City

- Second League of FBiH: 2014–15 (North), 2015–16 (North)
