= Nenad Gagro =

Bosnian footballer (born 1975)

Personal information
- Date of birth: 27 September 1975 (age 51)
- Place of birth: Mostar, SFR Yugoslavia
- Height: 1.83 m (6 ft 0 in)
- Position: Defender

Team information
- Current team: Zrinjski Mostar (assistant)

Youth career
- Zrinjski Mostar

Senior career*
Years	Team	Apps	(Gls)
2001–2002	Široki Brijeg		
2002	Saturn Ramenskoye	6	(0)
2003	Sarajevo		
2003–2005	Široki Brijeg		
2006–2007	Zrinjski Mostar	2	(0)

Managerial career
- 2019: GOŠK Gabela
- 2019: Zrinjski Mostar (caretaker)
- * Club domestic league appearances and goals

Nenad Gagro (born 27 September 1975) is a Bosnian professional football manager and former player who is currently working as an assistant manager at Bosnian Premier League club Zrinjski Mostar.

== Managerial statistics ==
As of 9 November 2019

Managerial record by team and tenure
Team	From	To	Record				
Team	From	To	P	W	D	L	Win %
GOŠK Gabela	25 June 2019	28 October 2019	15	9	3	3	60.00
Zrinjski Mostar (caretaker)	4 November 2019	12 November 2019	1	1	0	0	100.00
Total			16	10	3	3	62.50

== Honours ==
=== Player ===
Široki Brijeg

- Bosnian Premier League: 2003–04
