= Rajko Rašević =

Football player and manager

Personal information
- Full name: Rajko Rašević
- Date of birth: 17 November 1946
- Place of birth: Breza, FPR Yugoslavia
- Date of death: 7 March 2011 (aged 64)
- Place of death: Visoko, Bosnia and Herzegovina
- Position: Defender

Youth career
- Rudar Breza

Senior career*
Years	Team	Apps	(Gls)
1962	Rudar Breza	14	(2)
1963	Rudar Kakanj	19	(0)
1963–1968	Bosna Visoko	67	(4)
1968–1972	Maribor	79	(1)
1972–1973	Sarajevo	56	(0)
1973	Željezničar	32	(0)
1974	Regensburg	16	(1)
1974–1975	Xamax	22	(0)

Managerial career
- 1977–1980: Bosna Visoko
- 1980–1983: Iskra Bugojno
- 1984–1985: Novi Pazar
- 1987–1988: Diyarbakırspor
- 1990: Sarajevo
- * Club domestic league appearances and goals

Rajko Rašević (Serbian Cyrillic: Рајко Рашевић; 17 November 1946 – 7 March 2011) was a Yugoslav and Bosnian professional footballer and football manager.

== Playing career ==
Rašević started his playing career in his hometown club Rudar Breza, before eventually reaching the Yugoslav First League where he represented FK Sarajevo and Željezničar. He went on to play abroad in the Swiss Super League

== Managerial career ==
After ending his playing career, Rašević became a football manager, starting out as a coach in the youth team of Bosna Visoko before taking charge of the first team in 1977. He went on to manage Iskra Bugojno, FK Novi Pazar, Süper Lig side Diyarbakır and FK Sarajevo, before retiring from management in 1990 due to bad health.

== Death ==
Rašević died on 7 March 2011 in Visoko, Bosnia and Herzegovina at the age of 64.
