= Esmir Džafić =

Bosnian footballer

Personal information
- Full name: Esmir Džafić-Čaja
- Date of birth: 7 October 1967 (age 59)
- Place of birth: , SFR Yugoslavia
- Position: Midfielder

Senior career*
Years	Team	Apps	(Gls)
1996–2000	Bosna Visoko	96	(11)

International career^{‡}
1995	Bosnia and Herzegovina	1	(0)
- * Club domestic league appearances and goals ‡ National team caps and goals as of 12 June 2021

Esmir Džafić-Čaja (born 7 October 1967) is a Bosnian retired football player. He runs a football school in Visoko.

== Club career ==
He played for Bosna Visoko, when surprisingly being selected for the national team in 1995.

== International career ==
Džafić made one international appearance, in Bosnia and Herzegovina's first ever official international game, a November 1995 friendly match away against Albania.
