= Ibrahim Zukanović =

Bosnian footballer and manager (1957–2022)

Personal information
- Date of birth: 21 December 1957
- Place of birth: Zenica, PR Bosnia and Herzegovina, FPR Yugoslavia
- Date of death: 19 October 2022 (aged 64)

Youth career
- Čelik Zenica

Senior career*
Years	Team	Apps	(Gls)
1977–1990	Čelik Zenica		

Managerial career
- 2002–2007: Bosnia and Herzegovina U21
- 2009–2010: Sloga Uskoplje
- 2012–2013: Iskra Bugojno
- * Club domestic league appearances and goals

Ibrahim "Ibro" Zukanović (21 December 1957 – 19 October 2022) was a Bosnian professional football manager and player.

== Career ==
As a player, Zukanović played for 13 years at hometown club Čelik Zenica in the Yugoslav First and Second League. At the time of his death, he was among the three players with the most appearances for the club.

As a manager, he coached the Bosnia and Herzegovina U21 national team from 2002 until 2007. Zukanović also managed Sloga Uskoplje and lastly Iskra Bugojno.

== Death ==
Zukanović died on 19 October 2022, at the age of 64.

== Honours ==
=== Player ===
Čelik Zenica

- Yugoslav Second League: 1978–79 (West), 1982–83 (West), 1984–85 (West)
