= NK Novi Travnik =

- Full name: Nogometni klub Novi Travnik
- Founded: 1949
- Ground: Gradski Stadium
- Capacity: 1,000
- Manager: Asim Saračević
- League: Second League of FBiH - West
- 2018–19: First League of FBiH, 15th (relegated)
Home colours	Away colours

Football Club Novi Travnik (Bosnian: Nogometni klub Novi Travnik) is a football club from Novi Travnik, Bosnia and Herzegovina, currently playing in the Second League of the Federation of Bosnia and Herzegovina - West.

== History ==
The club was officially founded in September 1950, although the football section was established in 1949. The club was at first called NK Borac and later FK Bratstvo and played in regional leagues until it was dissolved in the early 1990s due to conditions during the Bosnian War. After the war, FK Bratstvo was re-established, but folded again in 2002 due to financial difficulties.

On 27 April 2013, the club was reformed under the name NK Novi Travnik and started playing in the SBK Canton League, winning the league in its first season, as well as winning the divisional cup. The following season, the club once again topped the table and was promoted to the First League of the Federation of Bosnia and Herzegovina.

== Honours ==
Honour	No.	Years
Second League	2	2014–15, 2017–18
Canton Leagues (Central Bosnia Canton)	1	2013–14
SBK Cup	1	2013–14
