= Simin Han =

- Village
- Location within Bosnia and Herzegovina
- Coordinates: 44°31′38.7″N 18°44′31.6″E
- Country: Bosnia and Herzegovina
- Entity: Federation of Bosnia and Herzegovina
- Canton: Tuzla
- Municipality: Tuzla
- Established: 1461

Area
  - Total: 1.31 sq mi (3.38 km^{2})
- Elevation: 804 ft (245 m)

Population (2013)
  - Total: 2,278
  - Density: 1,750/sq mi (674/km^{2})
- Time zone: UTC+1 (CET)
  - Summer (DST): UTC+2 (CEST)
- Area code: +387 (35)

Simin Han is a town east of Tuzla, Bosnia and Herzegovina. It has a school, a mosque, and a youth soccer training centre. Its neighboring towns are Gornja Tuzla and Slavinovići.

== History ==
During the Bosnia Eyalet of the Ottoman Empire, people would use this place as an overnight sleeping place. In the 17th century, people started populating the town, building houses and other buildings, including a mosque; the mosque still stands today and shortly renovated. The origin of the name Simin is Turkish and means 'silvery'.

== Demographics ==
According to the 2013 census, its population was 2,278.

Ethnicity in 2013
Ethnicity	Number	Percentage
Bosniaks	1,972	86.6%
Croats	132	5.8%
Serbs	60	2.6%
other/undeclared	114	5.0%
Total	2,278	100%

== Sports ==
The dominant sport in Simin Han is football. It has one football training centre, owned by local club Sloga Simin Han and a youth academy. Sloga Simin Han has a fierce rivalry with clubs FK Mladost Gornja Tuzla and Proleter Slavinovići. Basketball is also a popular sport in the town, and the main training centre is OKK Sloboda Tuzla.
