= Vitez City Stadium =

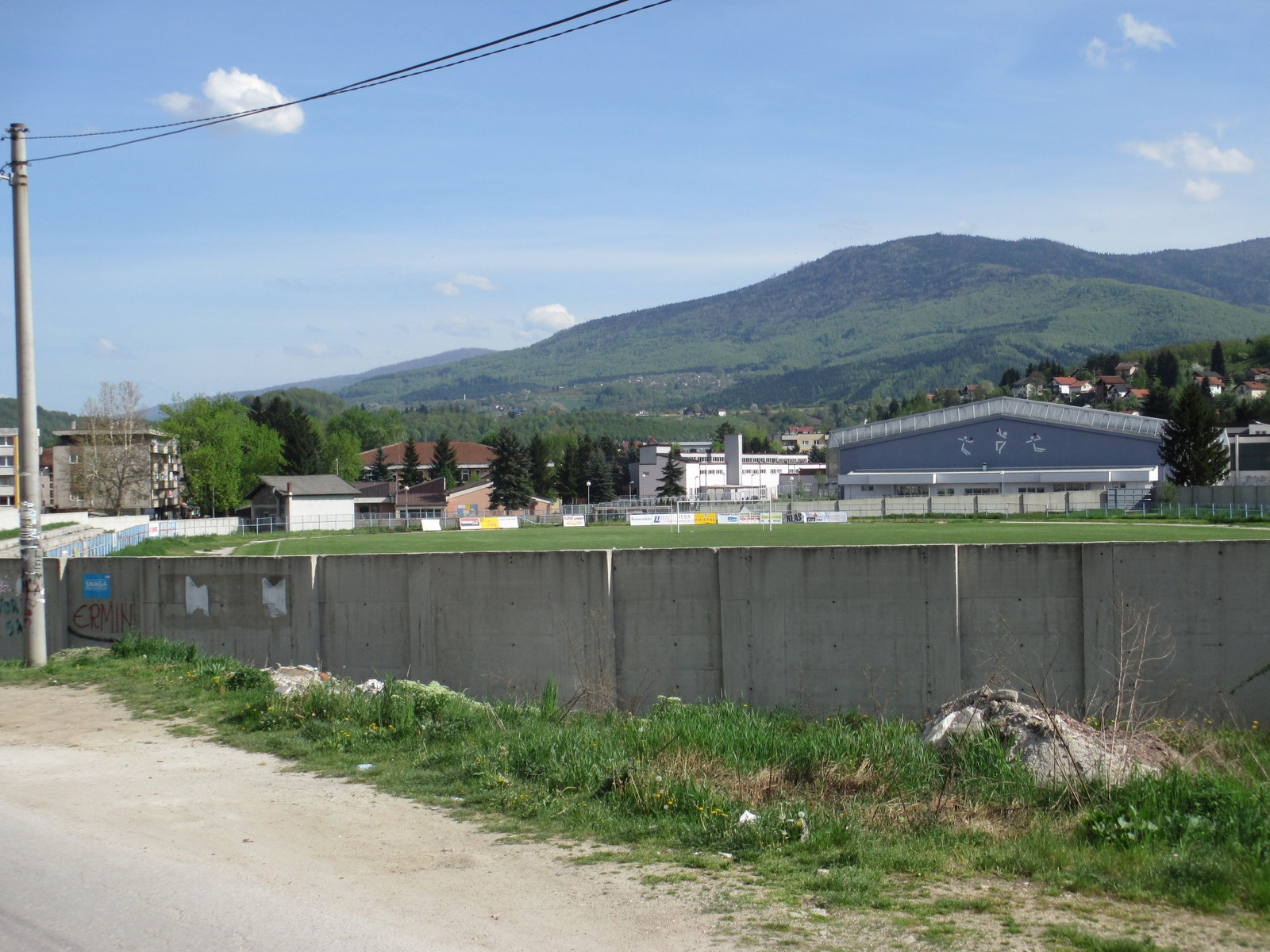
- Interactive map of Vitez City Stadium
- Location: Vitez, Bosnia and Herzegovina
- Coordinates: 44°9′14.51″N 17°47′18.04″E
- Capacity: 3,500

Tenants
- Vitez

Vitez City Stadium is a multi-use stadium in Vitez, Bosnia and Herzegovina. It is the home ground of Premier League of Bosnia and Herzegovina side Vitez. The stadium has capacity of 3,500 spectators.

Last reconstruction of the stadium was conducted in 2013.
