= NK Vitez =

Association football club in Bosnia and Herzegovina

- Full name: Nogometni klub Vitez
- Nickname: Vitezovi (Knights)
- Founded: 1947; 79 years ago
- Ground: Gradski stadion, Vitez
- Capacity: 3,500
- Chairman: Ivan Frljić
- Manager: Jasmin Đidić
- League: First League of FBiH
- 2025–26: First League of FBiH, 13th of 14
Home colours	Away colours

Nogometni klub Vitez is a professional football club, based in the town of Vitez, Bosnia and Herzegovina. The club currently plays in the First League of the Federation of Bosnia and Herzegovina and plays its home matches on the Gradski stadion in Vitez, which has a capacity of 3,500 seats.

The club's crest has a sword in front of a football ball. It also features the year when the club was established.

== History ==
The club was established after World War II in 1947 under the name of Radnik. Aside of that name, it was also once called Sloga, but from 1954 it has the name Vitez. Two times, they also had the name of the sponsor along their club name. In 2004, they were called NK Vitez FIS and in 2009 they were called NK Ecos Vitez. The first ever president of the club was Petar Paar.

== Honours ==
=== Domestic ===
==== League ====
- First League of the Federation of Bosnia and Herzegovina:
  - Winners (1): 2012–13
- Second League of the Federation of Bosnia and Herzegovina:
  - Winners (2): 2010–11 (west), 2024–25 (west)

== Managerial history ==
- (Bosnia and Herzegovina) Valentin Plavčić (2010–2013)
- (Croatia) Ante Miše (2013–2014)
- (Bosnia and Herzegovina) Husnija Arapović (2014)
- (Croatia) Ante Miše (2014–2015)
- (Bosnia and Herzegovina) Valentin Plavčić (2015)
- (Croatia) Branko Karačić (2015–2016)
- (Bosnia and Herzegovina) Slaven Musa (2016–2017)
- (Bosnia and Herzegovina) Ivica Bonić (2017)
- (Croatia) Branko Karačić (2017–2018)
- (Bosnia and Herzegovina) Ivica Bonić (2018)
- (Croatia) Vjeran Simunić (2018–2019)
- (Bosnia and Herzegovina) Veseljko Petrović (2019)
- (Bosnia and Herzegovina) Armin Duvnjak (2023–2025)
- (Bosnia and Herzegovina) Jasmin Đidić (2025–present)
