= Obren Cvijanović =

Bosnian footballer (born 1994)

Personal information
- Date of birth: 30 August 1994 (age 32)
- Place of birth: Kotor Varoš, Bosnia and Herzegovina
- Height: 1.85 m (6 ft 1 in)
- Position: Winger

Team information
- Current team: Kozara Gradiška
- Number: 17

Youth career
- –2013: Borac Banja Luka

Senior career*
Years	Team	Apps	(Gls)
2013–2017	Krupa	9	(1)
2018	Zvijezda Gradačac	42	(14)
2018–2022	Velež Mostar	58	(16)
2022–2023	Borac Banja Luka	24	(2)
2024–2025	Sloboda Tuzla	26	(1)
2025–2026	Zemun	45	(9)
2026–	Kozara Gradiška	2	(0)

International career
2021	Bosnia and Herzegovina	1	(0)
- * Club domestic league appearances and goals as of 14 May 2026

Obren Cvijanović (Serbian Cyrillic: Обрен Цвијановић; born 30 August 1994) is a Bosnian professional footballer who plays as a winger for First League of the Republika Srpska club Kozara Gradiška.

== Club career ==
Cvijanović made his professional debut for Krupa in the Bosnian Premier League on 24 July 2016, starting in a home game against Mladost Doboj Kakanj before being substituted out in the 57th minute. The game finished as a 1–1 draw.

== International career ==
Cvijanović made his international debut for Bosnia and Herzegovina on 27 March 2021 in a friendly game against Costa Rica, which finished as a 0–0 draw.

== Career statistics ==
=== International ===
As of match played 27 March 2021.

National team	Year	Apps	Goals
Bosnia and Herzegovina
Bosnia and Herzegovina	2021	1	0
Total		1	0
