= NK Metalleghe-BSI =

Metalleghe-BSI
- Full name: Nogometni klub Metalleghe-BSI
- Nickname: Kraljevi (The Kings)
- Founded: 6 August 2009; 17 years ago
- Ground: Stadion Mračaj, Jajce
- Capacity: 3,000
- Chairman: Zoran Dekić
- League: First League of Central Bosnia Canton
- 2019–20: First League of FBiH, 10th (stepped out of the First League of FBiH)
- Website: http://nkmetalleghe-bsi.com/
Home colours	Away colours

Nogometni klub Metalleghe-BSI (English: Football Club Metalleghe-BSI), formerly known as Nogometni klub Maestral-BSI (English: Football Club Maestral-BSI) is a professional association football club from the city of Jajce that is situated in Bosnia and Herzegovina.

The club is currently competing in the First League of Central Bosnia Canton, the country's fourth-tier league, after stepping out of the First League of the Federation of Bosnia and Herzegovina because of financial difficulties. Metalleghe-BSI also spent one season in the Premier League of Bosnia and Herzegovina, the country's top-tier league. The club plays its home matches on the Mračaj Stadium, which has a capacity of 3,000 seats.

== Honours ==
=== Domestic ===
==== League ====
- First League of the Federation of Bosnia and Herzegovina:
  - Winners (1): 2015–16
- Second League of the Federation of Bosnia and Herzegovina:
  - Winners (1): 2013–14 (west)
