= Stadion Mračaj =

Multi-use stadium in Jajce, Bosnia and Herzegovina

Coordinates: 44.345336975260466°N 17.2509300550802°E

Mračaj Stadium
- Interactive map of Mračaj Stadium
- Location: Jajce, Bosnia and Herzegovina
- Capacity: 4,300

Tenants
- Metalleghe-BSI

Mračaj Stadium is a multi-use stadium in Jajce, Bosnia and Herzegovina. It is the home ground of Premier League of Bosnia and Herzegovina side Metalleghe-BSI. The stadium has capacity of 4,300 spectators.
