= NK Podgrmeč =

- Full name: Nogometni Klub Podgrmeč Sanski Most
- Founded: April 4, 1944; 68 years ago
- Ground: Stadion NK Podgrmeč
- Capacity: 2000
- Chairman: Velid Kuželj
- Manager: Benjamin Ključanin
- League: Second League of FBiH
- 1st
Home colours	Away colours

NK Podgrmeč is a football club from the town of Sanski Most situated in the northwestern part of Bosnia and Herzegovina.

Stadion NK Podgrmeč

NK Podgrmeč was founded by local WWII hero Milancic Miljevic, on April 4, 1944, in the town of Sanski Most. The colours of the club are green and yellow. NK Podgrmeč currently plays in the First League of the Federation of Bosnia and Herzegovina, after spending six years in lower tier.
