= NK GOŠK Gabela =

Association football club in Bosnia and Herzegovina

GOŠK Gabela
- Full name: Gabeoski Omladinski Športski Klub (Gabela's Youth Sports Club)
- Nickname: Plavi lavovi (The Blue Lions)
- Short name: GOŠK
- Founded: 1919; 107 years ago
- Ground: Stadium Perica-Pero Pavlović
- Capacity: 3,000
- Chairman: Lujo Ilić
- Manager: Dženis Ćosić
- League: First League of FBiH
- 2025–26: First League of FBiH, 5th of 14
- Website: www.gosk.ba
Home colours	Away colours

Nogometni Klub GOŠK Gabela is a professional football club based in Gabela, Bosnia and Herzegovina. The name GOŠK in Croatian, is the abbreviation of "Gabeoski Omladinski Športski Klub" (lit. 'Gabela Youth Sports Club'). Currently, the club competes in the First League of the Federation of Bosnia and Herzegovina.

Their home ground is the Stadium Perica-Pero Pavlović (earlier called "Podavala" and Erar) in Gabela which can hold about 3,000 people. GNK Dinamo Zagreb donated 5,000 chairs to the club.

Their supporters are known as the Blue Lions (Plavi lavovi). They were founded in 2001.

== History ==
The first ball in Gabela was brought by Andrija Korda and Vidan Krvavac in 1919, from Mostar.

1941–45 the club was dissolved because of World War II. In 1948 the club was formed again. The club was named GOŠK after the recommendations of Milorad Mandrapa in 1958. Under the name GOŠK, the club achieved gradual improvement in competitive results. Gabela ranked among the most popular sports village in the former Yugoslavia. In the Socialist Federal Republic of Yugoslavia, GOŠK mostly played in the Fourth Unfederal League (Mostar zone) in the seasons (1948–60, 1962–63, 1964–66, 1968–92) and three times in the Third League (1961–62, 1963–64, 1966–67).

In the 1990s, GOŠK played in the First League of Herzeg-Bosnia, between 2001 and 2003 in the Second League of FBiH, and between 2003 and 2011 in the First League of FBiH. In the 2010–11 season, GOŠK won 1st place in the First League of FBiH and got promoted to the Premier League of Bosnia and Herzegovina, the elite football league in the country. They managed to repeat that achievement in the 2016–17 season and played in the Bosnian Premier League until the 2018–19 season when the club finished last in 12th place and got relegated back to the First League of FBiH. GOŠK was promoted back to the Premier League in the 2022–23 First League of FBiH season.

Former names

- 1919–1926 – FK Zmaj
- 1926–1935 – FK Seljačka Sloga
- 1935–1941 – Seljački športski klub (SŠK)
- 1948–1949 – NK Zmaj
- 1949–1958 – NK Sloga
- 1958–present – GOŠK Gabela

== Honours ==
=== Domestic ===
==== League ====
- First League of the Federation of Bosnia and Herzegovina:
  - Winners (3): 2010–11, 2016–17, 2022–23
  - Runners-up (3): 2007–08, 2014–15, 2021–22
- Second League of the Federation of Bosnia and Herzegovina:
  - Winners (1): 2002–03 (south)

== Players ==
=== Current squad ===
As of 13 April 2025

Note: Flags indicate national team as defined under FIFA eligibility rules; some limited exceptions apply. Players may hold more than one non-FIFA nationality.

No.	Pos.	Nation	Player
1	GK	BIH	Luka Pršlja (on loan from Zrinjski Mostar)
3	DF	BIH	Gabrijel Čoko
4	DF	CRO	Ivan Pavlović
5	MF	BIH	Damir Halilović
6	DF	BIH	Riad Šuta (captain)
7	DF	CRO	Marat Žlibanović
8	MF	SRB	Viktor Lukić
9	FW	CRO	Luka Anković
10	MF	CRO	Antonio Kaćunko
11	FW	CRO	Ivan Novaković
13	FW	BIH	Marko Culjak
15	MF	BIH	Nikola Perić
16	DF	BIH	Josip Miličević

No.	Pos.	Nation	Player
18	DF	BIH	Patrik Bošnjak
20	DF	BIH	Admir Sadiković
21	MF	BIH	Đani Salčin
22	FW	MKD	Kristijan Velinovski
23	DF	BIH	Miro Krešić
25	FW	BIH	Kristijan Sesar
30	FW	BIH	Goran Šujić
32	GK	BIH	Vasilije Kolak
33	DF	BIH	Dorian Medić
69	FW	SRB	Lazar Jovanović
70	FW	CRO	Karlo Perić
81	MF	BIH	Marko Kozina (on loan from Zrinjski Mostar)
88	DF	BIH	Josip Radoš

== Youth categories ==
Cadets and juniors play in the Youth Premier League. Pioneers and prior to pioneers play in the Youth Leagues of the Herzegovina-Neretva Canton.

== Andrija Anković memorial tournament ==
Every year since 1986, GOŠK host a memorial tournament in the name of Andrija Anković, in which teams such as GNK Dinamo Zagreb, HNK Hajduk Split, NK Široki Brijeg and HŠK Zrinjski Mostar usually play in.

== Managerial history ==
- (Croatia) Ivan Katalinić (1 July 2007 – 30 June 2008)
- (Bosnia and Herzegovina) Darko Dražić (15 June 2011 – 5 September 2011)
- (Bosnia and Herzegovina) Milomir Odović (8 September 2011 – 27 January 2012)
- (Bosnia and Herzegovina) Boris Gavran (30 January 2012 – 24 June 2012)
- (Bosnia and Herzegovina) Slaven Musa (27 June 2012 – 13 August 2012)
- (Croatia) Dario Zadro (13 August 2012 – 12 October 2012)
- (Croatia) Ivan Katalinić (5 September 2012 – 10 January 2013)
- (Croatia) Davor Mladina (10 January 2013 – 20 June 2013)
- (Croatia) Tomislav Raguž (1 July 2013 – 13 September 2013)
- (Bosnia and Herzegovina) Faruk Kulović (16 September 2013 – 30 June 2014)
- (Bosnia and Herzegovina) Darko Vojvodić (17 October 2014 – 30 June 2015)
- (Bosnia and Herzegovina) Faruk Kulović (1 July 2015 – 12 October 2015)
- (Croatia) Tomislav Raguž (19 January 2016 – 30 June 2016)
- (Bosnia and Herzegovina) Nedim Jusufbegović (1 July 2016 – 18 September 2016)
- (Bosnia and Herzegovina) Zlatko Križanović (caretaker) (23 September 2016 – 6 December 2016)
- (Bosnia and Herzegovina) Darko Vojvodić (7 January 2017 – 6 June 2017)
- (Bosnia and Herzegovina) Slaven Musa (12 June 2017 – 26 November 2017)
- (Bosnia and Herzegovina) Feđa Dudić (27 November 2017 – 28 September 2018)
- (Croatia) Mato Neretljak (28 September 2018 – 12 March 2019)
- (Croatia) Stanko Mršić (12 March 2019 – 1 June 2019)
- (Bosnia and Herzegovina) Nenad Gagro (25 June 2019 – 28 October 2019)
- (Bosnia and Herzegovina) Vule Trivunović (28 October 2019 – 22 August 2020)
- (Croatia) Igor Pamić (27 August 2020 – 26 October 2020)
- (Bosnia and Herzegovina) Ivan Bubalo (5 January 2021 – 27 March 2022)
- (Bosnia and Herzegovina) Dženan Hošić (28 March 2022 – 3 May 2022)
- (Bosnia and Herzegovina) Denis Ćorić (4 May 2022 – 6 November 2023)
- (Bosnia and Herzegovina) Toni Karačić (8 November 2023 – 12 February 2024)
- (Bosnia and Herzegovina) Admir Adžem (13 February 2024 – 12 August 2024)
- (Croatia) Danijel Pranjić (14 August 2024 – 27 October 2024)
- (Bosnia and Herzegovina) Damir Borovac (28 October 2024 – 30 June 2025)
- (Bosnia and Herzegovina) Damir Obad (1 July 2025 – 25 August 2025)
- (Croatia) Jure Obšivač (27 August 2025 – 13 April 2026)
- (Croatia) Ante Volarević (20 April 2026 – 9 June 2026)
- (Bosnia and Herzegovina) Darko Vojvodić (16 June 2026 – 28 September 2026)
- (Bosnia and Herzegovina) Dženis Ćosić (28 September 2026 – present)
