= Stadion Jaklić =

Stadium in Ugljevik, Bosnia and Herzegovina

Jaklić Stadium
- Interactive map of Jaklić Stadium
- Location: Bugojno, Bosnia and Herzegovina
- Coordinates: 44.052590100482355°N 17.455543705484136°E
- Owner: NK Iskra Bugojno
- Operator: NK Iskra Bugojno
- Capacity: 12,000
- Surface: Grass

Construction
- Built: 1980
- Renovated: 2016, 2017

Tenant
- NK Iskra Bugojno

Jaklić Stadium is a football stadium located in Bugojno, in central Bosnia and Herzegovina. It is the home ground of NK Iskra Bugojno. The total capacity of the stadium is 12,000 seats.
