= FK Tuzla City =

Association football club in Bosnia and Herzegovina

Tuzla City
- Full name: Fudbalski klub Tuzla City
- Nicknames: "Građani" and "Plavi"
- Founded: 1955; 71 years ago (as FK Sloga Simin Han)
- Ground: Tušanj City Stadium
- Capacity: 7,200
- Chairman: Almir Husić
- Manager: Šefik Imamović
- League: Second League of FBiH (North)
- 2025–26: First League of FBiH, 14th of 14 (relegated)
- Website: fktuzlacity.com
Home colours	Away colours

Fudbalski klub Tuzla City (lit. 'Football Club Tuzla City'), formerly known as Fudbalski klub Sloga Simin Han, is a professional football club based in Simin Han, Tuzla, Bosnia and Herzegovina. The club competes in the Second League of the Federation of Bosnia and Herzegovina (North), the third tier of football in the country.

== History ==
The club was founded in 1955. In the 2017–18 season, the club made history getting crowned champion of the First League of FBiH and getting promoted to the Premier League of Bosnia and Herzegovina for the first time in its history. On 18 June 2018, the club name was changed from FK Sloga Simin Han to FK Tuzla City. In the 2018–19 season, its first ever Premier League season, Tuzla City finished in 10th place, narrowly escaping relegation. In the 2019–20 season, the club finished on a great 5th place, even almost qualifying for the 2020–21 UEFA Europa League First qualifying round, but the season was ended abruptly due to the ongoing COVID-19 pandemic in Bosnia and Herzegovina and the club, by default, finished in 5th.

== Honours ==
=== Domestic ===
==== League ====
- Premier League of Bosnia and Herzegovina:
  - Runners-up (1): 2021–22
- First League of the Federation of Bosnia and Herzegovina:
  - Winners (1): 2017–18
- Second League of the Federation of Bosnia and Herzegovina:
  - Winners (2): 2014–15 (north), 2015–16 (north)

== European record ==
=== Summary ===
As of 28 July 2022

Competition	Pld	W	D	L	GF	GA	Last season played
UEFA Europa Conference League	4	2	0	2	8	5	2022–23
Total	4	2	0	2	8	5	—

=== Matches ===
Season	Competition	Round	Opponent	Home	Away	Agg.
2022–23	UEFA Europa Conference League	1Q	(San Marino) Tre Penne	6–0	2–0	8–0
2022–23	UEFA Europa Conference League	2Q	(Netherlands) AZ	0–4	0–1	0–5

== Managerial history ==
- (Bosnia and Herzegovina) Milenko Bošnjaković (1 July 2014 – 1 December 2016)
- (Bosnia and Herzegovina) Nermin Bašić (8 January 2017 – 4 June 2017)
- (Bosnia and Herzegovina) Darko Vojvodić (7 June 2017 – 29 January 2018)
- (Bosnia and Herzegovina) Ratko Ninković (30 January 2018 – 26 March 2018)
- (Bosnia and Herzegovina) Mensur Dedić (interim) (28 March 2018 – 1 June 2018)
- (Bosnia and Herzegovina) Slobodan Starčević (12 June 2018 – 25 February 2019)
- (Bosnia and Herzegovina) Mirza Varešanović (26 February 2019 – 26 May 2019)
- (Bosnia and Herzegovina) Milenko Bošnjaković (29 May 2019 – 29 September 2019)
- (Bosnia and Herzegovina) Elvir Baljić (2 October 2019 – 9 March 2020)
- (Bosnia and Herzegovina) Zlatan Nalić (11 March 2020 – 16 October 2020)
- (Bosnia and Herzegovina) Nermin Bašić (19 October 2020 – 31 December 2020)
- (Bosnia and Herzegovina) Husref Musemić (7 January 2021 – 10 April 2022)
- (Bosnia and Herzegovina) Selver Ahmetović (interim) (10 April 2022 – 31 May 2022)
- (Bosnia and Herzegovina) Dragan Jović (1 June 2022 – 28 November 2022)
- (Bosnia and Herzegovina) Milenko Bošnjaković (19 December 2022 – 29 September 2023)
- (Bosnia and Herzegovina) Adnan Osmanhodžić (interim) (30 September 2023 – 31 December 2023)
- (Serbia) Slavko Petrović (8 January 2024 – 31 March 2024)
- (Bosnia and Herzegovina) Samir Adanalić (1 July 2024 – 2 October 2024)
- (Bosnia and Herzegovina) Selver Ahmetović (2 October 2024 – 25 March 2025)
- (Bosnia and Herzegovina) Semir Užičanin (4 April 2025 – 30 June 2025)
- (Bosnia and Herzegovina) Selvir Mujić (9 July 2025 – 1 September 2025)
- (Bosnia and Herzegovina) Aleksandar Vasić (3 September 2025 – 31 December 2025)
- (Bosnia and Herzegovina) Dalibor Ignjić (28 January 2026 – 5 May 2026)
- (Slovenia) Alen Medović (7 May 2026 – 4 June 2026)
- (Bosnia and Herzegovina) Nermin Hasić (7 July 2026 – 17 August 2026)
- (Bosnia and Herzegovina) Šefik Imamović (17 August 2026 – present)
