= Stadion Luke (Visoko) =

Football stadium in Visoko, Bosnia and Herzegovina

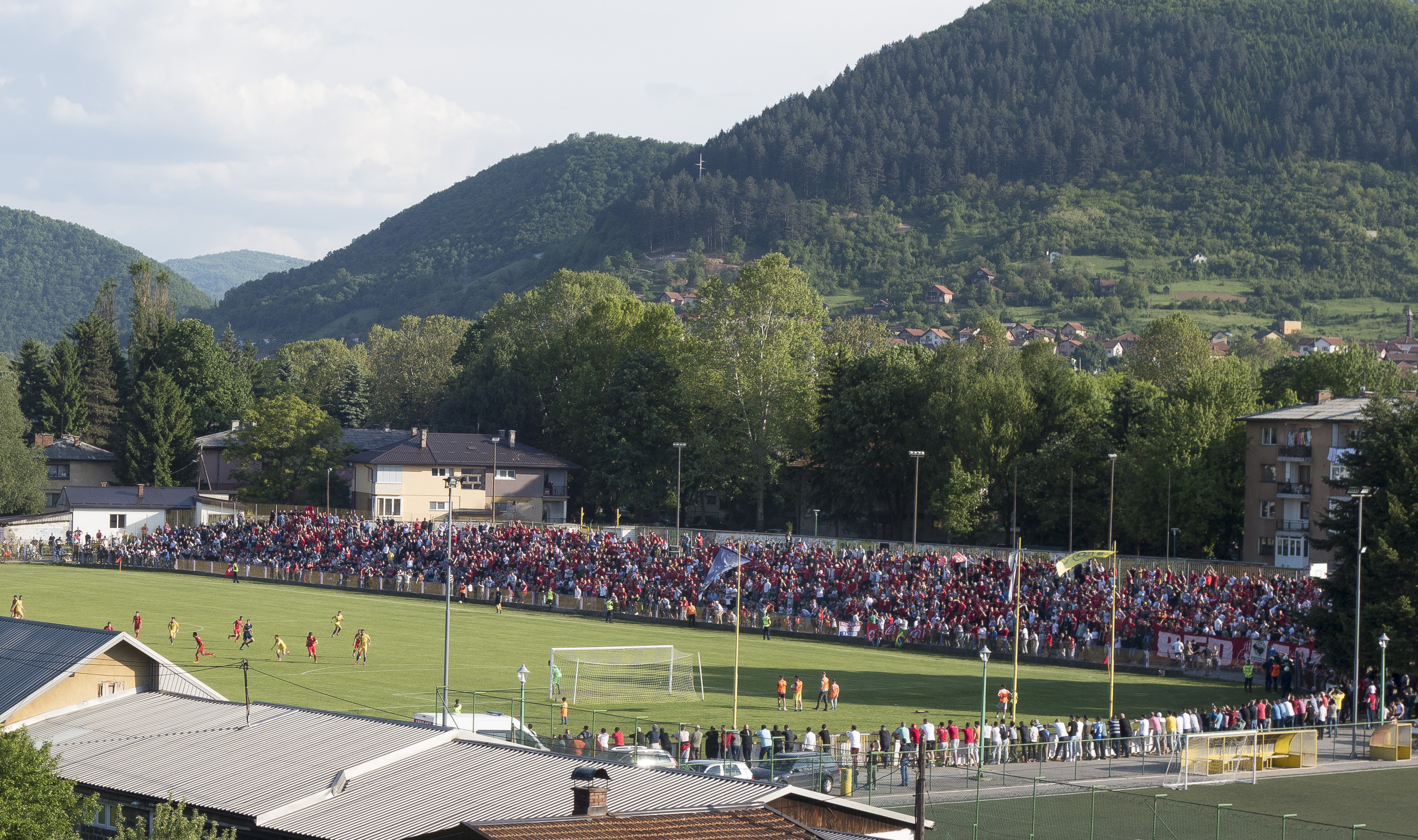
- Interactive map of Stadion Luke
- Full name: Gradski stadion Luke
- Former names: Stadion 7. april
- Location: Visoko, Bosnia and Herzegovina
- Coordinates: 43.994359144757446°N 18.180169785771223°E
- Owner: City of Visoko
- Operator: NK Bosna Visoko
- Capacity: 5,200
- Surface: Grass
- Field size: 105 × 96 m

Tenant
- NK Bosna Visoko

Stadion Luke, also known as Gradski stadion Luke, is a football stadium in Visoko, Bosnia and Herzegovina. It is the home ground of NK Bosna Visoko. The stadium is located in the Luke area of the city.

The venue was formerly known as Stadion 7. april. On 24 December 1996, the Visoko municipal council adopted a decision formally changing the name from Stadion sportskih igara "7. april" to Stadion sportskih igara "Luke".

Published sources give differing figures for the stadium's capacity. The City of Visoko lists the capacity of the wider stadium complex as 2,000–3,000.

== Facilities ==
In addition to the main football pitch, the Stadion Luke complex includes an auxiliary football field, a handball court, a basketball court and a bocce court. The auxiliary football field is of full competition dimensions and has artificial turf and LED floodlighting. It is used for training and matches by NK Bosna's senior and youth teams.

== Renovations ==
A series of improvements to the Stadion Luke complex was carried out during the 2010s. In 2015 and 2016, work included the construction and fitting-out of the auxiliary artificial-turf field, renovation of changing rooms used by NK Bosna's youth teams, improvements to fencing and entrances, and the covering of part of the main stand.

Further work in 2018 and 2019 included the installation of 1,650 new seats on the main stand, reconstruction of the main pitch, additional lighting for the auxiliary field, installation of an irrigation system, renovation of changing-room facilities, and installation of video-surveillance and alarm systems.

By September 2020, approximately one million KM had reportedly been invested in reconstruction and improvements at the stadium complex. The programme included work on the auxiliary pitch, dressing rooms, seating, irrigation and lighting, as well as a fitness centre and security systems.
