= 2026–27 First League of the Federation of Bosnia and Herzegovina =

First League of the Federation of Bosnia and Herzegovina
- Season: 2026–27
- Dates: 14 August 2026 – May 2027

The 2026–27 First League of the Federation of Bosnia and Herzegovina (known as the Wwin First League for sponsorship reasons) is the 27th season of the First League of the Federation of Bosnia and Herzegovina, the second tier football league of Bosnia and Herzegovina. The season began on 14 August 2026 and is scheduled to end in May 2027.

The league was expanded from 14 to 16 clubs for this season. Each team plays 30 matches over 30 rounds in a double round-robin format.

== Teams ==
The following 16 clubs are competing in the 2026–27 season.

Team	Location	Stadium	Capacity
Bratstvo	Gračanica	Gradski stadion Luke	3,000
Budućnost	Banovići	Stadion FK Budućnost	8,500
Čapljina	Čapljina	Stadion Bjelave	2,000
GOŠK	Gabela	Stadium Perica-Pero Pavlović	3,200
Igman	Konjic	Gradski stadion Konjic	3,000
Jedinstvo	Bihać	Stadion pod Borićima	5,504
Posušje	Posušje	Stadion Mokri Dolac	5,040
Radnik	Hadžići	Gradski stadion	500
Rudar	Kakanj	Stadion pod Vardom	2,000
Sloboda	Tuzla	Tušanj City Stadium	7,200
Stupčanica	Olovo	Stadion Danac	1,500
Tomislav	Tomislavgrad	Gradski stadion Tomislav	2,000
TOŠK	Tešanj	Stadion Luke	7,000
Travnik	Travnik	Stadion Pirota	3,076
Vitez	Vitez	Gradski stadion Vitez	3,500
Zvijezda	Gradačac	Stadion Banja Ilidža	4,320

== League table ==
Pos	Team	Pld	W	D	L	GF	GA	GD	Pts	Promotion or relegation
1	Travnik	8	7	1	0	16	5	+11	22	Promotion to the Premijer Liga BiH
2	Posušje	8	5	3	0	11	5	+6	18	
3	Stupčanica Olovo	8	5	1	2	19	7	+12	16	
4	GOŠK Gabela	8	5	1	2	12	6	+6	16	
5	Igman Konjic	8	4	3	1	11	7	+4	15	
6	Sloboda Tuzla	8	4	2	2	15	8	+7	14	
7	TOŠK Tešanj	8	4	0	4	10	10	0	12	
8	Jedinstvo Bihać	8	2	3	3	15	11	+4	9	
9	Zvijezda Gradačac	8	2	2	4	7	7	0	8	
10	Bratstvo Gračanica	8	1	5	2	10	12	−2	8	
11	Radnik Hadžići	8	2	1	5	5	9	−4	7	
12	Rudar Kakanj	8	2	1	5	5	12	−7	7	
13	Čapljina	8	2	1	5	9	18	−9	7	Relegation to the Second League of FBiH
14	Vitez	8	1	3	4	5	11	−6	6	Relegation to the Second League of FBiH
15	Budućnost	8	1	3	4	9	18	−9	6	Relegation to the Second League of FBiH
16	Tomislav	8	1	2	5	10	23	−13	5	Relegation to the Second League of FBiH

Updated to match(es) played on 26 October 2026. Source: Goal.com
Rules for classification: 1) Points; 2) Head-to-head points; 3) Head-to-head goal difference; 4) Head-to-head goals scored; 5) Head-to-head away goals scored (only if two teams); 6) Goal difference; 7) Goals scored; 8) Play-off.

== Top goalscorers ==
As of 26 October 2026

Rank	Player	Club	Goals
1	(Bosnia and Herzegovina) Dino Šaran	TOŠK Tešanj	11
2	(Bosnia and Herzegovina) Ali Međuseljac	Jedinstvo Bihać	10
3	(Bosnia and Herzegovina) M. Varešanović	Stupčanica Olovo	5
3	(Bosnia and Herzegovina) S. Krpić	Stupčanica Olovo	5
5	(Bosnia and Herzegovina) F. Delilbašić	Travnik	4
5	(Bosnia and Herzegovina) G. Šujić	Bratstvo Gračanica	4
