= 2011–12 First League of the Federation of Bosnia and Herzegovina =

First League of the Federation of Bosnia and Herzegovina
- Season: 2011–12
- Champions: Gradina; 1st First League title
- Promoted: Gradina
- Relegated: Orašje; Famos-SAŠK N. UNIS Vogošća; Omladinac
- Matches: 240
- Goals: 683 (2.85 per match)
- Top goalscorer: Jasmin Mujkić (24 goals)
- Biggest home win: Bratstvo 10–0 Omladinac
- Biggest away win: Omladinac 0–6 Rudar
- Highest scoring: Bratstvo 10–0 Omladinac (10 goals)
- Longest winning run: 4 matches Budućnost; Vitez
- Longest unbeaten run: 15 matches Gradina
- Longest winless run: 20 matches Omladinac
- Longest losing run: 16 matches Omladinac

The 2011–12 First League of the Federation of Bosnia and Herzegovina was the twelfth season of the First League of the Federation of Bosnia and Herzegovina, the second tier football league of Bosnia and Herzegovina. The 2011–12 fixtures were announced on 13 July 2011. It began on 13 August 2011 and ended on 9 June 2012; a winter break where no matches were played was in effect between 19 November 2011 and 10 March 2012. GOŠK were the last champions, having won their first championship title in the 2010–11 season and earning a promotion to Premier League of Bosnia and Herzegovina while in this season Gradina won their first championship title of the First League of the Federation of Bosnia and Herzegovina.

16 clubs participated in this session, eleven returning from the previous session, one relegated from Premier League of Bosnia and Herzegovina and four promoted from four regional Second League of the Federation of Bosnia and Herzegovina.

== Changes from last season ==
=== Team changes ===
==== From First League of the FBiH ====
Promoted to Premier League

- GOŠK

Relegated to one of 4 respective regional Second League of the FBiH

- Radnik (H) (Second League of the FBiH – Center)
- Igman (K) (Second League of the FBiH – South)
- Slaven (Second League of the FBiH – North)
- Bosna (V) (Second League of the FBiH – Center)

==== To First League of FBiH ====
Relegated from Premier League

- Budućnost

Promoted from four regional Second League of the FBiH

- Bratstvo (Second League of the FBiH – North)
- Branitelj (Second League of the FBiH – South)
- Vitez (Second League of the FBiH – West 1)^{1}
- UNIS (Second League of the FBiH – Center)

^{1}After winning the play-off against the winner of Second League of the FBiH – West 2 Podgrmeč. After 2010–11 session, West 1 and West 2 leagues merged in one, Second League of the FBiH – West.

=== Change of name ===
SAŠK Napredak, which competed last session in First league of the FBiH, faced a crisis and sold their position and club to Famos, which competed in the Second League of the FBiH – Center. As they could not just sell their position the two clubs merged in one under the name Famos-SAŠK Napredak and continued to compete in First League of the FBiH in this session. In the next session the club will return its name to Famos.

== Teams ==
Radnik, Igman, Slaven i Bosna were relegated to their respective third-level league at the end of the 2010–11 season. For Bosna this is the worst league tier they played in since independence of BiH. The promoted and relegated teams were replaced by the champions of the four third–level leagues, Bratstvo Gračanica from the Second League of the FBiH – North, Branitelj from the Second League of the FBiH – South, Vitez from the Second League of the FBiH – West and UNIS from the Second League of the FBiH – Center.

=== Stadia and locations ===
Location of clubs in 2011–12 Premijer Liga

Team	Location	Stadium	Capacity
Branitelj	Rodoč, Mostar	HNK Branitelj Stadium	300
Bratstvo	Gračanica	Gradski Stadion Luke, Gračanica	3,000
Budućnost	Banovići	FK Budućnost Stadium	4,600
Čapljina	Čapljina	Bjelave Stadium	3,000
Famos-SAŠK	Ilidža, Sarajevo	Hrasnica Stadium	3,000
Goražde	Goražde	Midhat Drljević Stadium	1,500
Gradina	Srebrenik	Gradski stadion, Srebrenik	8,000
Iskra	Bugojno	Jaklić Stadium	11,000
Jedinstvo	Bihać	Pod Borićima Stadion	7,500
Krajina	Cazin	Gradski stadion, Cazin	6,000
Krajišnik	Velika Kladuša	Gradski Stadion, Velika Kladuša	5,628
Omladinac	Mionica	Lipik Stadium	1,300
Orašje	Orašje	NC GOAL	3,500
Rudar	Kakanj	Stadion pod Vardom	4,568
UNIS	Vogošća	Hakija Mršo Stadium	5,000
Vitez	Vitez	Gradski Stadion, Vitez	3,000

== League table ==
Pos	Team	Pld	W	D	L	GF	GA	GD	Pts	Promotion or relegation
1	Gradina Srebrenik (C)	30	19	4	7	59	30	+29	61	Promotion to Premijer liga BiH
2	Budućnost	30	17	3	10	47	32	+15	54	
3	Vitez	30	15	7	8	55	31	+24	52	
4	Rudar Kakanj	30	15	7	8	51	33	+18	52	
5	Krajina	30	14	8	8	39	28	+11	50	
6	Bratstvo Gračanica	30	14	7	9	63	30	+33	49	
7	Iskra	30	14	6	10	42	34	+8	48	
8	Čapljina	30	15	3	12	42	34	+8	48	
9	Goražde	30	13	3	14	38	43	−5	42	
10	Branitelj	30	12	4	14	43	42	+1	40	
11	Jedinstvo Bihać	30	11	6	13	48	46	+2	39	
12	Krajišnik	30	12	5	13	41	42	−1	38 (Note: Krajišnik were deducted 3 points due to leaving the pitch in revolt before the end of the game against Krajina.)	
13	Orašje (R)	30	12	2	16	41	61	−20	38	Relegation to Second League FBiH
14	Famos-SAŠK N. (R)	30	10	7	13	34	38	−4	37	Relegation to Second League FBiH
15	UNIS Vogošća (R)	30	4	2	24	23	64	−41	14	Relegation to Second League FBiH
16	Omladinac (R)	30	5	2	23	18	96	−78	17 (Note: Omladinac decided to leave the competition after the end of round 20 due to abysmal result since the begin of the second half-season. Because of that fact, all games that were already played against them will be registered with the archived result, while all the games that have been left to be played will be registered with an official result of 3–0.)	Relegation to Second League FBiH

Source: NSFBiH (in Bosnian)
Rules for classification: 1st points; 2nd goal difference; 3rd goals scored
For deciding champions, qualification to higher rank and relegation: 1st points; 2nd head-to-head points; 3rd head-to-head goal difference; 4th head-to-head goals scored; 5th head-to-head away goals scored; 6th goal difference; 7th goals scored
(C) Champions; (R) Relegated

=== Positions by round ===
Team ╲ Round	1	2	3	4	5	6	7	8	9	10	11	12	13	14	15	16	17	18	19	20	21	22	23	24	25	26	27	28	29	30
Branitelj	8	3	1	4	2	6	4	4	7	12	13	10	13	9	10	11	11	11	12	11	11	11	12	11	11	9	10	9	10	10
Bratstvo Gračanica	5	10	9	11	6	4	7	5	8	4	6	6	8	7	9	9	6	8	5	4	5	4	5	3	2	2	2	3	8	6
Budućnost	10	9	6	3	5	3	6	8	9	5	3	5	4	6	5	3	5	5	8	5	8	8	8	8	5	7	5	2	2	2
Čapljina	9	5	10	8	9	5	3	2	2	3	2	4	3	2	3	1	2	2	1	1	2	2	3	6	7	5	4	6	5	8
Famos-SAŠK N.	4	12	5	5	7	11	8	11	6	7	7	9	12	14	13	13	12	13	14	13	13	14	13	14	14	14	14	14	14	14
Goražde	15	16	14	15	11	13	12	9	5	10	9	12	7	10	11	10	8	10	9	10	10	9	10	10	9	10	9	11	9	9
Gradina Srebrenik	1	1	4	2	4	8	5	7	4	8	4	2	2	3	2	2	1	1	2	2	1	1	1	1	1	1	1	1	1	1
Iskra	13	11	13	10	14	10	11	13	15	13	15	14	9	11	8	6	9	7	7	4	7	7	7	7	8	6	8	7	6	7
Jedinstvo Bihać	11	6	7	9	13	9	13	10	12	11	12	7	11	12	12	12	13	12	11	12	12	13	14	12	12	11	11	10	11	11
Krajina	2	4	2	7	3	2	2	3	1	2	1	1	1	1	1	4	3	6	4	6	4	6	6	4	6	8	6	8	7	5
Krajišnik	16	15	12	14	15	15	14	14	13	14	11	8	14	13	15	15	14	14	13	14	14	12	11	13	13	13	12	12	12	12
Omladinac	6	8	8	6	8	7	9	6	10	6	10	13	15	15	14	14	15	15	15	15	16	16	16	16	16	16	16	16	16	16
Orašje	7	7	11	12	10	12	10	12	11	9	8	11	6	5	4	7	10	9	10	9	9	10	9	9	10	12	13	13	13	13
Rudar Kakanj	3	2	3	1	1	1	1	1	3	1	5	3	5	4	6	8	4	3	3	3	3	3	4	2	4	4	7	5	4	4
UNIS Vogošća	12	14	16	13	16	16	16	16	16	16	16	16	16	16	16	16	16	16	16	16	15	15	15	15	15	15	15	15	15	15
Vitez	14	13	15	16	12	14	15	15	14	15	14	15	10	8	7	5	7	4	6	8	6	5	2	5	3	3	3	4	3	3

Promotion to Premijer liga BiH
Relegation to Second League FBiH

Updated to match(es) played on 9 June 2012. Source: SportSport.ba

== Results ==
Home \ Away	BRA	BRT	BUD	ČAP	FSN	GOR	GRA	ISK	JED	KRA	KRŠ	OML	ORA	RKA	UNI	VIT
Branitelj		2–2	1–3	1–1	0–0	3–0	2–0	1–0	2–0	2–0	2–1	3–0	1–2	0–1	4–0	4–1
Bratstvo Gračanica	5–0		3–1	2–0	3–1	4–1	1–2	3–0	4–1	3–0	1–0	10–0	5–0	1–1	1–0	0–0
Budućnost	3–0	2–0		0–0	1–0	1–0	1–1	2–0	2–0	2–0	1–0	4–3	1–1	3–0	5–1	2–1
Čapljina	1–0	3–2	0–1		1–0	6–1	2–0	3–2	0–2	1–0	4–0	3–0	3–2	2–0	4–1	0–2
Famos-SAŠK N.	2–1	2–0	2–1	2–0		4–2	2–1	1–1	3–1	1–1	0–0	3–0	3–0	0–2	2–1	0–1
Goražde	4–2	0–0	2–0	2–0	1–0		0–0	0–1	1–0	2–1	3–0	3–0	0–2	3–0	4–1	1–0
Gradina Srebrenik	3–0	4–1	3–2	1–0	4–0	2–0		3–1	5–2	3–0	1–1	3–0	4–3	2–0	4–2	1–0
Iskra	2–0	2–1	2–0	3–1	3–3	2–3	1–0		3–0	0–0	2–0	4–0	1–0	3–1	1–0	2–1
Jedinstvo Bihać	1–1	0–3 (Note: Match between Jedinstvo and Bratstvo was aborted in 85 minute at result 0–1 for Bratstvo when the assistant referee was hit from the stands by a solid object. The contest commission decided to award Bratstvo a technical 0–3 win and suspended the stadium of Jedinstvo until the case is processed by the disciplinary commission.)	2–0	1–0	2–1	3–0	3–1	1–1		0–2	2–1	9–0	3–0	1–1	4–1	3–3
Krajina	2–1	1–1	2–0	1–0	2–0	3–1	1–0	0–0	2–0		3–0 (Note: Local derby match Krajina–Krajišnik, in week 13, was abandoned in the 90 minute after player of Krajišnik left the pitch in revolt against the decision of the referee and was not played till end. The disciplinary and contest commission awarded Krajina with a technical win of 3–0, while 3 points were deducted from Krajišnik.)	4–1	2–0	1–1	3–1	1–1
Krajišnik	3–0	1–1	2–1	3–0	1–0	0–0	0–3	1–1	2–1	2–1		3–0	4–2	3–0	3–1	3–4
Omladinac	0–3	2–1	0–3	1–1	2–1	3–2	0–1	1–0	1–1	0–3	0–3		2–1	0–6	0–3	0–3
Orašje	1–3	2–1	0–1	0–3	1–1	2–1	1–3	2–1	3–2	4–1	1–4	3–0		2–0	1–0	1–0
Rudar Kakanj	2–0	1–0	2–1	4–1	0–0	2–0	1–1	3–1	2–1	0–0	2–0	3–2	5–1		3–1	2–2
UNIS Vogošća	0–3	0–2	0–3 (Note: The contest commission awarded Budućnost a 0–3 win over UNIS in week 10, after the match was not played when it was scheduled.)	0–1	2–0	0–1	0–2	0–1	0–0	0–1	2–0	5–0	1–2	0–5		0–0
Vitez	2–1	1–1	4–1	0–1	3–0	1–0	3–1	3–1	1–2	1–1	2–0	4–0	5–1	2–1	4–0	

Updated to match(es) played on 9 June 2012. Source: NSFBiH
Legend: Blue = home team win; Yellow = draw; Red = away team win.

=== Clubs season-progress ===
Team ╲ Round	1	2	3	4	5	6	7	8	9	10	11	12	13	14	15	16	17	18	19	20	21	22	23	24	25	26	27	28	29	30
Branitelj	D	W	W	L	W	L	W	D	L	L	L	W	L	W	L	L	W	L	L	W	D	D	L	W	W	W	L	W	L	L
Bratstvo Gračanica	W	L	D	L	W	W	L	W	L	W	D	D	L	W	L	W	W	L	W	W	D	W	D	W	D	W	D	L	L	W
Budućnost	L	W	W	W	L	W	L	L	D	W	W	L	W	L	W	W	L	D	L	W	L	D	W	W	W	L	W	W	W	W
Čapljina	D	W	L	W	L	W	W	W	D	L	W	L	W	D	W	W	L	W	W	W	L	L	L	L	L	W	W	L	W	L
Famos-SAŠK N.	W	L	W	D	L	L	W	D	W	D	D	D	L	L	L	L	W	L	D	D	W	L	W	L	L	W	L	W	L	W
Goražde	L	L	W	L	W	L	W	W	W	L	D	L	W	D	L	W	W	L	D	L	W	W	L	L	W	L	W	L	W	L
Gradina Srebrenik	W	W	L	W	L	L	W	L	W	L	W	W	W	L	W	D	W	W	D	W	W	D	W	W	W	D	W	W	W	L
Iskra	L	W	L	D	D	W	D	L	L	W	L	W	W	D	W	W	L	W	D	W	L	D	W	W	L	W	L	W	W	L
Jedinstvo Bihać	L	W	D	D	L	W	L	W	L	W	L	W	L	D	L	D	L	W	W	L	L	D	L	W	W	W	D	W	L	L
Krajina	W	D	W	L	W	W	D	D	W	L	W	D	W	L	W	L	D	L	W	L	W	D	D	W	D	L	W	L	W	W
Krajišnik	L	L	W	L	D	L	W	L	W	D	W	W	L	D	L	D	W	L	W	L	W	W	D	L	W	L	W	W	L	L
Omladinac	W	L	D	W	L	W	L	W	L	W	L	L	L	D	L	L	L	L	L	L	L	L	L	L	L	L	L	L	L	L
Orašje	W	L	L	L	W	L	W	L	W	W	D	L	W	W	W	L	L	D	L	W	W	L	W	L	L	L	L	L	L	W
Rudar Kakanj	W	W	D	W	W	W	L	D	L	D	L	W	L	W	L	D	W	W	W	D	L	W	D	W	L	D	L	W	W	W
UNIS Vogošća	L	L	L	W	L	L	L	D	L	L	L	L	L	L	W	L	L	W	L	L	L	L	L	L	L	L	D	L	L	W
Vitez	L	D	L	D	W	L	L	D	W	D	W	D	W	W	W	W	D	W	L	L	W	W	W	L	W	W	D	L	W	W

Source: NSFBiH
W = Win; D = Draw; L = Lose

== Season statistics ==
=== Top goalscorers ===
Rank	Player	Club	Goals
1	(Bosnia and Herzegovina) Jasmin Mujkić	Bratstvo	24
2	(Bosnia and Herzegovina) Damir Smajlović	Gradina	19
3	(Bosnia and Herzegovina) Sabahudin Jusufbašić	Čapljina	13

== See also ==
- 2010–11 First League of the Federation of Bosnia and Herzegovina
- 2011–12 First League of the Republika Srpska
- 2011–12 Premier League of Bosnia and Herzegovina
- 2011–12 Kup Bosne i Hercegovine
- Football Federation of Bosnia and Herzegovina
