= Sedin Ljuca =

Bosnian footballer

Personal information
- Date of birth: 21 March 1996 (age 30)
- Place of birth: Sarajevo, Bosnia and Herzegovina
- Height: 1.82 m (6 ft 0 in)
- Position: Winger

Team information
- Current team: Jedinstvo Bihać

Youth career
- –2014: Olimpik
- 2014–2015: Slavija Sarajevo

Senior career*
Years	Team	Apps	(Gls)
2015	Slavija Sarajevo	1	(0)
2015–2016	Drina HE Višegrad		
2016–2017	Novi Grad Sarajevo		
2017	FK Kechnec		
2017–2018	Goražde		
2018–2019	Bosna Visoko	14	(0)
2019	Vis Simm-Bau		
2019–2020	Slavija Sarajevo	11	(1)
2020	Vis Simm-Bau		
2020–2021	Radnik Hadžići	15	(6)
2021	Čapljina	13	(6)
2021–2022	Igman Konjic	29	(7)
2022–2023	Bratstvo Gračanica	15	(9)
2023	Città di Casalbordino		
2024-2025	Jedinstvo Bihać	14	(0)
- * Club domestic league appearances and goals as of 2 January 2024

Sedin Ljuca (born 21 March 1996) is a Bosnian professional footballer who plays as a winger.

== Club career ==
=== Čapljina ===
In February 2021, Ljuca signed a contract with Bosnian club Čapljina. After a half season, Ljuca left the club.

=== Igman Konjic ===
In July 2021, Ljuca signed a contract with Bosnian club Igman Konjic. In that season, Ljuca won the League with Igman and achieved historic success in the Cup by playing against Sarajevo in the semi-finals. He left the club at the end of a season.

=== Bratstvo Gračanica ===
Ljuca signed a contract with Bosnian club Bratstvo Gračanica in August 2022.

=== Città di Casalbordino ===
In January 2023, Ljuca signed a contract with Italian lower division club Città di Casalbordino. He left the club after a half season.

=== Stupčanica Olovo ===
Ljuca signed a contract with Bosnian club Stupčanica in July 2023. After a half season, Ljuca resigned with the club.

== Career statistics ==
=== Club ===
As of match played 19 November 2023

Appearances and goals by club, season and competition
Club	Season	League			National cup (Note: Appearance(s) in Bosnia and Herzegovina Football Cup)		Europe		Total	
Club	Season	League	Apps	Goals	Apps	Goals	Apps	Goals	Apps	Goals
Slavija Sarajevo	2014–15	Bosnian Premier League	1	0	0	0	–		1	0
Bosna Visoko	2018–19	First League of FBiH	14	0	1	1	—		15	1
Slavija Sarajevo	2019–20	First League of RS	11	1	1	0	–		12	1
Radnik Hadžići	2020–21	First League of FBiH	15	6	0	0	—		15	6
Čapljina	2020–21	First League of FBiH	13	6	0	0	—		13	6
Igman Konjic	2021–22	First League of FBiH	29	7	6	3	—		35	10
Bratstvo Gračanica	2022–23	First League of FBiH	15	9	0	0	—		15	9
Stupčanica	2023–24	First League of FBiH	14	5	1	0	—		15	5
Career total			112	34	9	4	0	0	121	38

== Honours ==
Igman Konjic

- First League of FBiH: 2021–22
