= 2022–23 First League of the Federation of Bosnia and Herzegovina =

First League of the Federation of Bosnia and Herzegovina
- Season: 2022–23
- Dates: 13 August 2022 – 4 June 2023
- Champions: GOŠK
- Promoted: GOŠK
- Relegated: Travnik; Radnički
- Matches: 240
- Goals: 640 (2.67 per match)
- Top goalscorer: Ajdin Mujagić (20 goals)
- Biggest home win: Jedinstvo 6–1 Zvijezda (20 May 2023)
- Biggest away win: Jedinstvo 0–7 Radnički (13 August 2022)
- Highest scoring: Gradina 5–3 Vis Simm-Bau (3 June 2023)
- Longest winning run: GOŠK (13 matches)
- Longest unbeaten run: GOŠK (13 matches)
- Longest winless run: Radnički (11 matches)
- Longest losing run: Radnički (7 matches)

The 2022–23 First League of the Federation of Bosnia and Herzegovina (known as the m:tel First League for sponsorship reasons) was the 23rd season of the First League of the Federation of Bosnia and Herzegovina, the second tier football league of Bosnia and Herzegovina. The season began on 13 August 2022 and ended on 4 June 2023.

GOŠK Gabela were crowned champions, winning their third championship title and earning promotion to the Premier League of Bosnia and Herzegovina.

== Teams ==
Team	Location	Stadium	Capacity
Bratstvo	Gračanica	Gradski Stadion Luke, Gračanica	3,000
Budućnost	Banovići	Stadion FK Budućnost	8,500
Goražde	Goražde	Midhat Drljević Stadium	1,500
GOŠK	Gabela	Perica-Pero Pavlović Stadium	3,000
Gradina	Srebrenik	Gradski Stadion, Srebrenik	5,000
Jedinstvo	Bihać	Pod Borićima Stadium	7,500
Mladost	Doboj, Kakanj	MGM Farm Arena	3,000
Radnički	Lukavac	Stadion Jošik	3,000
Radnik	Hadžići	Gradski Stadion, Hadžići	500
Rudar	Kakanj	Stadion Rudara	4,568
Stupčanica	Olovo	Danac Stadium	1,500
Tomislav	Tomislavgrad	Gradski stadion, Tomislav	2,000
TOŠK	Tešanj	Luke Stadium, Tešanj	7,000
Travnik	Travnik	Pirota Stadium	4,000
Vis Simm-Bau	Kosova, Maglaj	Grabovac Stadium	1,200
Zvijezda	Gradačac	Banja Ilidža	5,000

== League table ==
Pos	Team	Pld	W	D	L	GF	GA	GD	Pts	Promotion or relegation
1	GOŠK Gabela (C, P)	30	19	7	4	59	24	+35	64	Promotion to the Premijer Liga BiH
2	Stupčanica	30	16	4	10	46	27	+19	52	
3	Budućnost	30	14	8	8	41	37	+4	50	
4	Goražde	30	14	7	9	41	31	+10	49	
5	Zvijezda Gradačac	30	14	5	11	59	52	+7	47	
6	Gradina	30	14	5	11	40	39	+1	47	
7	Tomislav	30	12	7	11	43	39	+4	43	
8	Rudar Kakanj	30	13	4	13	40	41	−1	43	
9	TOŠK Tešanj	30	10	10	10	29	26	+3	40	
10	Vis Simm-Bau	30	9	12	9	42	46	−4	39	
11	Jedinstvo Bihać	30	11	4	15	40	47	−7	37	
12	Bratstvo Gračanica	30	10	6	14	42	43	−1	36	
13	Mladost Doboj Kakanj	30	10	6	14	32	45	−13	36	
14	Radnik Hadžići	30	10	4	16	26	37	−11	34	
15	Travnik (R)	30	10	1	19	26	49	−23	31	Relegation to the Second League of FBiH
16	Radnički Lukavac (R)	30	6	6	18	34	57	−23	24	Relegation to the Second League of FBiH

Source: sportdc.net
Rules for classification: 1) Points; 2) Head-to-head points; 3) Head-to-head goal difference; 4) Head-to-head goals scored; 5) Head-to-head away goals scored (only if two teams); 6) Goal difference; 7) Goals scored; 8) Play-off.
(C) Champions; (P) Promoted; (R) Relegated

== Top goalscorers ==
Rank	Player	Club	Goals
1	(Bosnia and Herzegovina) Ajdin Mujagić	Zvijezda	20
2	(Bosnia and Herzegovina) Nihad Šero	GOŠK	18
3	(Bosnia and Herzegovina) Husein Poturalić	Vis Simm-Bau	16
4	(Montenegro) Luka Merdović	Jedinstvo	15
5	(Bosnia and Herzegovina) Nikola Šiško	Tomislav	14
6	(Bosnia and Herzegovina) Aldin Hrvanović	Stupčanica	13
6	(Bosnia and Herzegovina) Armin Imamović	Rudar	13
8	(Bosnia and Herzegovina) Petar Banović	Tomislav	12
9	(Bosnia and Herzegovina) Kenan Dervišagić	Gradina	11
9	(Bosnia and Herzegovina) Munib Karahmetović	Stupčanica	11

== See also ==
- 2022–23 Premier League of Bosnia and Herzegovina
- 2022–23 First League of the Republika Srpska
- 2022–23 Bosnia and Herzegovina Football Cup
