= Kerim Tatar =

Bosnia and Herzegovinan footballer (born 1996)

Personal information
- Date of birth: 2 September 1996 (age 30)
- Place of birth: Mostar, Bosnia and Herzegovina
- Height: 1.77 m (5 ft 10 in)
- Position: Winger

Team information
- Current team: Igman Konjic
- Number: 10

Youth career
- Velež Mostar

Senior career*
Years	Team	Apps	(Gls)
2015–2017	Velež Mostar	32	(7)
2018	Olimpik	20	(3)
2019	Igman Konjic	13	(4)
2019–2021	Goražde	39	(15)
2021	IFK Mariehamn	1	(0)
2022	Mladost	12	(2)
2022	TOŠK Tešanj	14	(2)
2023	Goražde	27	(4)
2024	Leotar	16	(0)
2024–2025	Goražde	26	(3)
2025–	Igman Konjic	9	(1)
- * Club domestic league appearances and goals as of 12 June 2026

Kerim Tatar (born 2 September 1996) is a Bosnia and Herzegovinan professional footballer who plays as a winger for First League of FBiH club Igman Konjic.

== Personal life ==
His brother Benjamin is also a professional footballer.

== Career statistics ==
As of 19 June 2025

Appearances and goals by club, season and competition
Club	Season	League			Cup (Note: Includes Bosnian Cup)		Total	
Club	Season	Division	Apps	Goals	Apps	Goals	Apps	Goals
Velež Mostar	2015–16	Bosnian Premier League	4	0	0	0	4	0
Velež Mostar	2016–17	First League of FBiH	25	7	2	0	27	7
Velež Mostar	2017–18	First League of FBiH	3	0	0	0	3	0
Velež Mostar	Total		32	7	2	0	34	7
Olimpik	2017–18	First League of FBiH	12	3	–		12	3
Olimpik	2018–19	First League of FBiH	8	0	0	0	8	0
Olimpik	Total		20	3	0	0	20	3
Igman Konjic	2018–19	First League of FBiH	13	4	–		13	4
Goražde	2019–20	First League of FBiH	12	4	1	1	13	5
Goražde	2020–21	First League of FBiH	27	11	2	1	29	12
Goražde	Total		39	15	3	2	42	17
IFK Mariehamn	2021	Veikkausliiga	1	0	0	0	1	0
Mladost Doboj Kakanj	2021–22	First League of FBiH	12	2	–		12	2
TOŠK Tešanj	2022–23	First League of FBiH	14	2	1	0	15	2
Goražde	2022–23	First League of FBiH	14	2	–		14	2
Goražde	2023–24	First League of FBiH	13	2	2	2	15	4
Goražde	Total		27	4	2	2	29	6
Leotar	2023–24	First League of RS	16	0	–		16	0
Goražde	2024–25	First League of FBiH	26	3	0	0	26	3
Career total			200	40	8	4	208	44
