= 2020–21 First League of the Federation of Bosnia and Herzegovina =

First League of the Federation of Bosnia and Herzegovina
- Season: 2020–21
- Dates: 8 August 2020 – 5 June 2021
- Champions: Posušje
- Promoted: Posušje
- Relegated: Čapljina; Slaven
- Matches: 240
- Goals: 604 (2.52 per match)
- Top goalscorer: Dženan Haračić (18 goals)
- Biggest home win: Posušje 7–0 Budućnost (14 November 2020)
- Biggest away win: Slaven 0–7 Bratstvo (24 April 2021)
- Highest scoring: Slaven 0–7 Bratstvo (24 April 2021); Posušje 7–0 Budućnost (14 November 2020); GOŠK 6–1 Travnik (22 May 2021); GOŠK 6–1 Slaven (16 May 2021); Slaven 4–3 Orašje (5 September 2020)
- Longest winning run: TOŠK; Goražde; Bratstvo (5 matches)
- Longest unbeaten run: Posušje (11 matches)
- Longest winless run: Slaven (25 matches)
- Longest losing run: Slaven (14 matches)

The 2020–21 First League of the Federation of Bosnia and Herzegovina (known as the m:tel First League for sponsorship reasons) was the 21st season of the First League of the Federation of Bosnia and Herzegovina, the second tier football league of Bosnia and Herzegovina. The season began on 8 August 2020 and ended on 5 June 2021.

Posušje were crowned champions, winning their first championship title and earning promotion to the Premier League of Bosnia and Herzegovina.

== Teams ==
Team	Location	Stadium	Capacity
Bratstvo	Gračanica	Gradski Stadion Luke, Gračanica	3,000
Budućnost	Banovići	Stadion FK Budućnost	8,500
Čapljina	Čapljina	Bjelave Stadium	3,000
Goražde	Goražde	Midhat Drljević Stadium	1,500
GOŠK	Gabela	Perica-Pero Pavlović Stadium	3,000
Igman	Konjic	Gradski Stadion, Konjic	5,000
Jedinstvo	Bihać	Pod Borićima Stadium	7,500
Orašje	Orašje	Gradski Stadion, Orašje	3,000
Posušje	Posušje	Mokri Dolac Stadium	8,000
Radnik	Hadžići	Gradski Stadion, Hadžići	500
Rudar	Kakanj	FK Rudar Stadium	4,568
Slaven	Živinice	Gradski Stadion, Živinice	500
TOŠK	Tešanj	Luke Stadium, Tešanj	7,000
Travnik	Travnik	Pirota Stadium	4,000
Vis Simm-Bau	Kosova, Maglaj	Grabovac Stadium	1,200
Zvijezda	Gradačac	Banja Ilidža	5,000

== League table ==
Pos	Team	Pld	W	D	L	GF	GA	GD	Pts	Promotion or relegation
1	Posušje (C, P)	30	18	7	5	49	15	+34	61	Promotion to the Premijer Liga BiH
2	TOŠK Tešanj	30	16	6	8	48	28	+20	54	
3	Rudar Kakanj	30	15	5	10	43	31	+12	50	
4	Goražde	30	14	7	9	43	37	+6	49	
5	Zvijezda Gradačac	30	14	6	10	44	31	+13	48	
6	Bratstvo Gračanica	30	14	6	10	43	30	+13	48	
7	GOŠK Gabela	30	12	7	11	38	27	+11	43	
8	Jedinstvo Bihać	30	13	4	13	26	36	−10	43	
9	Radnik Hadžići	30	11	7	12	32	36	−4	40	
10	Budućnost	30	12	4	14	38	49	−11	40	
11	Vis Simm-Bau	30	11	6	13	42	37	+5	39	
12	Travnik	30	10	9	11	31	37	−6	39	
13	Igman Konjic	30	10	7	13	38	35	+3	37	
14	Orašje	30	10	6	14	43	51	−8	36	
15	Čapljina (R)	30	10	6	14	38	49	−11	36	Relegation to the Second League of FBiH
16	Slaven Živinice (R)	30	1	5	24	17	84	−67	8	Relegation to the Second League of FBiH

Source: NS FBiH
Rules for classification: 1) Points; 2) Head-to-head points; 3) Head-to-head goal difference; 4) Head-to-head goals scored; 5) Head-to-head away goals scored (only if two teams); 6) Goal difference; 7) Goals scored; 8) Play-off.
(C) Champions; (P) Promoted; (R) Relegated

== Results ==
Home \ Away	BRA	BUD	ČAP	GOR	GOŠ	IGM	JED	ORA	POS	RAD	RUD	SLA	TOŠ	TRA	VIS	ZVI
Bratstvo Gračanica		4–1	2–1	2–0	1–0	3–0	3–1	1–2	0–0	4–1	1–2	2–0	1–0	2–0	0–4	1–3
Budućnost Banovići	3–0		4–2	2–2	1–0	1–1	2–0	3–2	1–0	3–0	1–3	2–0	1–2	1–0	2–3	0–0
Čapljina	0–1	2–1		2–2	0–1	1–0	1–1	2–0	1–1	3–1	1–0	5–1	1–3	1–1	3–2	3–1
Goražde	2–0	3–2	3–0		4–1	0–2	1–1	1–0	1–0	1–3	3–0	0–0	2–1	2–1	2–2	1–2
GOŠK Gabela	1–1	1–0	1–0	0–1		0–0	1–0	2–1	1–1	1–2	3–0	6–1	2–0	6–1	1–0	1–1
Igman Konjic	0–2	4–0	4–0	3–1	0–2		1–0	3–1	0–1	0–1	1–0	3–0	1–2	0–0	3–0	3–1
Jedinstvo Bihać	0–0	0–1	1–0	0–2	2–1	2–1		2–1	0–2	1–0	1–0	3–0	1–0	1–0	1–0	1–0
Orašje	2–2	1–2	3–0	1–0	3–3	2–1	4–1		1–1	1–0	3–1	6–0	2–2	0–0	0–4	2–1
Posušje	1–1	7–0	3–1	2–0	1–0	2–2	4–1	4–0		3–1	1–0	2–0	0–2	3–0	0–0	1–0
Radnik Hadžići	0–0	3–0	0–0	1–2	0–0	2–0	1–0	0–0	0–1		1–3	3–1	0–1	1–4	1–1	2–1
Rudar Kakanj	0–2	2–0	3–1	0–0	1–0	2–2	3–0	5–0	0–2	0–1		4–0	2–1	3–2	2–1	1–0
Slaven Živinice	0–7	1–1	0–1	1–2	0–1	1–1	0–3	4–3	0–4	1–3	0–1		1–3	2–2	0–3	0–1
TOŠK Tešanj	3–0	2–0	3–3	2–1	2–1	3–0	1–1	1–0	0–1	1–1	1–1	4–0		1–0	2–0	1–1
Travnik	1–0	2–1	0–2	1–1	1–0	1–1	0–1	3–1	1–0	1–0	1–1	2–2	1–0		1–0	1–0
Vis Simm-Bau	1–0	0–1	2–1	1–2	1–1	2–0	3–0	2–0	0–1	2–3	1–3	1–0	2–1	1–1		2–2
Zvijezda Gradačac	1–0	2–1	4–0	4–1	1–0	2–1	3–0	0–1	1–0	0–0	0–0	5–1	1–2	3–2	3–1	

Source: NS FBiH
Legend: Blue = home team win; Yellow = draw; Red = away team win.

== Top goalscorers ==
Rank	Player	Club	Goals
1	(Bosnia and Herzegovina) Dženan Haračić	GOŠK	18
2	(Bosnia and Herzegovina) Selmir Mahmutović	Vis Simm-Bau	15
3	(Bosnia and Herzegovina) Maid Jaganjac	Bratstvo	13
4	(Bosnia and Herzegovina) Dino Dizdarević	Vis Simm-Bau	12
4	(Bosnia and Herzegovina) Sedin Ljuca	Čapljina	12

== See also ==
- 2020–21 Premier League of Bosnia and Herzegovina
- 2020–21 First League of the Republika Srpska
- 2020–21 Bosnia and Herzegovina Football Cup
