= Enis Sadiković =

Bosnian footballer

Personal information
- Date of birth: 21 March 1990 (age 36)
- Place of birth: Sarajevo, Bosnia and Herzegovina
- Height: 1.80 m (5 ft 11 in)
- Position: Midfielder

Team information
- Current team: VfL Biedenkopf
- Number: 20

Youth career
- –2008: Radnik Hadžići
- 2008–2009: Sparta Prague

Senior career*
Years	Team	Apps	(Gls)
2009–2010	Sparta Prague B	6	(0)
2010–2011	Radnik Hadžići		
2011–2012	Grün Weiß Micheldorf		
2012–2013	Radnik Hadžići		
2013–2016	Željezničar	37	(1)
2016–2017	Krupa	10	(0)
2017	Čelik Zenica	12	(0)
2017–2018	Bosna Visoko	19	(2)
2018–2020	Olimpik	10	(0)
2020–2022	Rudar Kakanj	35	(1)
2022–2023	Radnik Hadžići	23	(2)
2023–	VfL Biedenkopf		

International career^{‡}
2008–2009	Bosnia and Herzegovina U19	10	(0)
- * Club domestic league appearances and goals as of 2 January 2024 ‡ National team caps and goals as of 1 June 2009

Enis Sadiković (born 21 March 1990) is a Bosnian professional footballer who plays as a midfielder for Bezirksoberliga club VfL Biedenkopf.

== Club career ==
=== Krupa ===
In June 2016, Sadiković alongside Čomor signed a contract with Bosnian club Krupa. After a half season, Sadiković left the club.

=== Čelik Zenica ===
In January 2017, Sadiković signed a contract with Bosnian club Čelik Zenica. He left the club at the end of a season.

=== Bosna Visoko ===
In July 2017, Sadiković signed a contract with Bosnian club Bosna Visoko.

=== Olimpik ===
In June 2018, Sadiković signed a contract with Bosnian club Olimpik. He left the club after two years.

=== Rudar Kakanj ===
Sadiković signed a contract with Bosnian club Rudar Kakanj. He left the club after two years.

== Personal life ==
Enis Sadiković has a younger brother Damir Sadiković, who was also a footballer who plays for Serbian SuperLiga club Napredak Kruševac.

== Career statistics ==
=== Club ===
As of match played 19 November 2022

Appearances and goals by club, season and competition
Club	Season	League			National cup (Note: Appearance(s) in Bosnia and Herzegovina Football Cup)		Europe		Total	
Club	Season	League	Apps	Goals	Apps	Goals	Apps	Goals	Apps	Goals
Sparta Prague B	2009–10	Czech National Football League	6	0	0	0	–		6	0
Željezničar	2013–14	Bosnian Premier League	8	0	1	0	—		9	0
Željezničar	2014–15	Bosnian Premier League	15	0	2	0	–		17	0
Željezničar	2015–16	Bosnian Premier League	14	1	3	0	6 (Note: Appearance(s) in UEFA Europa League)	0	23	1
Željezničar	Total		37	1	6	0	6	0	49	1
Krupa	2016–17	Bosnian Premier League	10	0	1	0	–		11	0
Čelik Zenica	2016–17	Bosnian Premier League	12	0	0	0	–		12	0
Bosna Visoko	2017–18	First League of FBiH	19	2	1	0	–		20	2
Olimpik	2018–19	First League of FBiH	3	0	0	0	—		3	0
Olimpik	2019–20	First League of FBiH	7	0	4	0	–		11	0
Olimpik	Total		10	0	4	0	0	0	14	0
Rudar Kakanj	2020–21	First League of FBiH	23	0	0	0	—		23	0
Rudar Kakanj	2021–22	First League of FBiH	12	1	0	0	–		12	1
Rudar Kakanj	Total		35	1	0	0	0	0	35	1
Radnik Hadžići	2021–22	First League of FBiH	10	1	0	0	—		10	1
Radnik Hadžići	2022–23	First League of FBiH	13	1	0	0	–		13	1
Radnik Hadžići	Total		23	1	0	0	0	0	23	2
Career total			152	6	12	0	6	0	170	6

== Honours ==
Olimpik Sarajevo

- First League of FBiH: 2019–20
