= Kenan Dervišagić =

Bosnian footballer (born 2000)

Personal information
- Date of birth: 29 July 2000 (age 26)
- Place of birth: Tuzla, Bosnia and Herzegovina
- Height: 1.85 m (6 ft 1 in)
- Position: Striker

Team information
- Current team: Floriana
- Number: 9

Youth career
- 2016–2020: Sarajevo

Senior career*
Years	Team	Apps	(Gls)
2019–2023	Sarajevo	8	(1)
2020	→ Rudar Kakanj (loan)	15	(6)
2022	→ Radnik Hadžići (loan)	19	(7)
2023	→ Gradina (loan)	14	(8)
2023–2025	Sloboda Tuzla	46	(5)
2025	Bishkek City	13	(4)
2026–	Floriana	19	(6)

International career
2016	Bosnia and Herzegovina U16	3	(0)
- * Club domestic league appearances and goals as of 17 May 2026

Kenan Dervišagić (born 29 July 2000) is a Bosnian professional footballer who plays as a striker for Maltese Premier League club Floriana.

== Career statistics ==
=== Club ===
As of match played 13 March 2026

Appearances and goals by club, season and competition
Club	Season	League			National cup (Note: Includes Bosnian Cup, Kyrgyzstan Cup, Maltese FA Trophy)		Continental		Total	
Club	Season	Division	Apps	Goals	Apps	Goals	Apps	Goals	Apps	Goals
Sarajevo	2018–19	Bosnian Premier League	1	1	0	0	—		1	1
Sarajevo	2019–20	Bosnian Premier League	0	0	0	0	—		0	0
Sarajevo	2020–21	Bosnian Premier League	1	0	—		—		1	0
Sarajevo	2021–22	Bosnian Premier League	6	0	2	1	2 (Note: Appearances in UEFA Europa Conference League)	0	10	1
Sarajevo	2022–23	Bosnian Premier League	0	0	—		—		0	0
Sarajevo	Total		8	1	2	1	2	0	12	2
Rudar Kakanj (loan)	2019–20	First League of FBiH	1	0	1	0	—		2	0
Rudar Kakanj (loan)	2020–21	First League of FBiH	14	6	1	0	—		15	6
Rudar Kakanj (loan)	Total		15	6	2	0	—		17	6
Radnik Hadžići (loan)	2021–22	First League of FBiH	7	4	—		—		7	4
Radnik Hadžići (loan)	2022–23	First League of FBiH	12	3	—		—		12	3
Radnik Hadžići (loan)	Total		19	7	—		—		19	7
Gradina (loan)	2022–23	First League of FBiH	14	8	—		—		14	8
Sloboda Tuzla	2023–24	First League of FBiH	29	5	3	1	—		32	6
Sloboda Tuzla	2024–25	Bosnian Premier League	17	0	1	0	—		18	0
Sloboda Tuzla	Total		46	5	4	1	—		50	6
Bishkek City	2025	Kyrgyz Premier League	13	4	2	0	—		15	4
Floriana	2025–26	Maltese Premier League	12	4	1	0	—		13	4
Career total			127	35	11	2	2	0	140	37

== Honours ==
Sarajevo

- Bosnian Cup: 2020–21
