= 2023–24 First League of the Federation of Bosnia and Herzegovina =

First League of the Federation of Bosnia and Herzegovina
- Season: 2023–24
- Dates: 12 August 2023 – 9 June 2024
- Champions: Sloboda
- Promoted: Sloboda
- Relegated: Rudar; Mladost
- Matches: 240
- Goals: 633 (2.64 per match)
- Top goalscorer: Fijad Mehanović; Predrag Vladić (17 goals each)
- Biggest home win: Sloboda 6–2 Mladost (1 October 2023); Stupčanica 6–2 Mladost (26 May 2024)
- Biggest away win: Tomislav 4–5 Vis Simm-Bau (21 October 2023)
- Highest scoring: Tomislav 4–5 Vis Simm-Bau (21 October 2023); Bratstvo 6–3 Gornji Rahić (20 April 2024)
- Longest winning run: Sloboda; Bratstvo (8 matches each)
- Longest unbeaten run: Sloboda (17 matches)
- Longest winless run: Mladost (14 matches)
- Longest losing run: Mladost (8 matches)

The 2023–24 First League of the Federation of Bosnia and Herzegovina was the 24th season of the First League of the Federation of Bosnia and Herzegovina, the second tier football league of Bosnia and Herzegovina. The season began on 12 August 2023 and ended on 9 June 2024.

Sloboda Tuzla were crowned champions, winning their second championship title and earning promotion to the Premier League of Bosnia and Herzegovina.

== Teams ==
Team	Location	Stadium	Capacity
Bratstvo	Gračanica	Gradski Stadion Luke, Gračanica	3,000
Budućnost	Banovići	Stadion FK Budućnost	8,500
Čelik	Zenica	Bilino Polje Stadium	13,694
Goražde	Goražde	Midhat Drljević Stadium	1,500
Gornji Rahić	Gornji Rahić	SRC Gornji Rahić	1,190
Gradina	Srebrenik	Gradski Stadion, Srebrenik	5,000
Jedinstvo	Bihać	Pod Borićima Stadium	7,500
Mladost	Doboj, Kakanj	MGM Farm Arena	3,000
Radnik	Hadžići	Gradski Stadion, Hadžići	500
Rudar	Kakanj	Stadion Rudara	4,568
Sloboda	Tuzla	Tušanj City Stadium	7,200
Stupčanica	Olovo	Danac Stadium	1,500
Tomislav	Tomislavgrad	Gradski stadion, Tomislav	2,000
TOŠK	Tešanj	Luke Stadium, Tešanj	7,000
Vis Simm-Bau	Kosova, Maglaj	Grabovac Stadium	1,200
Zvijezda	Gradačac	Banja Ilidža	5,000

== League table ==
Pos	Team	Pld	W	D	L	GF	GA	GD	Pts	Promotion or relegation
1	Sloboda Tuzla (C, P)	30	21	6	3	54	20	+34	69	Promotion to the Premijer Liga BiH
2	Stupčanica	30	19	5	6	54	24	+30	62	
3	Bratstvo Gračanica	30	16	4	10	43	36	+7	52	
4	Čelik Zenica	30	12	10	8	40	31	+9	46	
5	Tomislav	30	12	9	9	48	40	+8	45	
6	Gornji Rahić	30	13	6	11	45	41	+4	45	
7	Goražde	30	12	7	11	36	29	+7	43	
8	Vis Simm-Bau	30	11	7	12	50	52	−2	40	
9	Budućnost	30	11	6	13	36	42	−6	39	
10	Zvijezda Gradačac	30	12	5	13	40	36	+4	38 (Note: Zvijezda were deducted 3 points for financial irregularities.)	
11	Radnik Hadžići	30	9	10	11	29	35	−6	37	
12	TOŠK Tešanj	30	11	3	16	40	44	−4	36	
13	Gradina	30	9	7	14	25	43	−18	34	
14	Jedinstvo Bihać	30	9	6	15	27	51	−24	33	
15	Rudar Kakanj (R)	30	7	9	14	33	42	−9	30	Relegation to the Second League of FBiH
16	Mladost Doboj Kakanj (R)	30	4	4	22	33	67	−34	16	Relegation to the Second League of FBiH

Source: sportdc.net
Rules for classification: 1) Points; 2) Head-to-head points; 3) Head-to-head goal difference; 4) Head-to-head goals scored; 5) Head-to-head away goals scored (only if two teams); 6) Goal difference; 7) Goals scored; 8) Play-off.
(C) Champions; (P) Promoted; (R) Relegated

== Top goalscorers ==
Rank	Player	Club	Goals
1	(Bosnia and Herzegovina) Fijad Mehanović	Stupčanica	17
1	(Bosnia and Herzegovina) Predrag Vladić	Vis Simm-Bau	17
3	(Bosnia and Herzegovina) Anes Mašić	Čelik	13
3	(Bosnia and Herzegovina) Eldin Mehmedović	Gornji Rahić	13
5	(Bosnia and Herzegovina) Stefan Božić	Stupčanica	10
5	(Bosnia and Herzegovina) Haris Dilaver	Sloboda	10
5	(Bosnia and Herzegovina) Dino Dizdarević	TOŠK	10
5	(Bosnia and Herzegovina) Eldin Fačić	Gornji Rahić	10
5	(Bosnia and Herzegovina) Husein Poturalić	Bratstvo	10
10	(Bosnia and Herzegovina) Dino Kalesić	Sloboda	9
10	(Bosnia and Herzegovina) Branimir Šiško	Tomislav	9

== See also ==
- 2023–24 Premier League of Bosnia and Herzegovina
- 2023–24 First League of the Republika Srpska
- 2023–24 Bosnia and Herzegovina Football Cup
