= 2024–25 First League of the Federation of Bosnia and Herzegovina =

First League of the Federation of Bosnia and Herzegovina
- Season: 2024–25
- Dates: 17 August 2024 – 8 June 2025
- Champions: Stupčanica
- Relegated: Gradina; Goražde; Zvijezda; Gornji Rahić; Radnički
- Matches: 210
- Goals: 568 (2.7 per match)
- Top goalscorer: Maid Jaganjac (14 goals)
- Biggest home win: Gornji Rahić 7–2 Radnički (21 May 2025)
- Biggest away win: Radnički 0–4 Travnik (26 April 2025); Gradina 0–4 TOŠK (17 May 2025); Radnički 0–4 Tomislav (25 May 2025)
- Highest scoring: Gornji Rahić 7–2 Radnički (21 May 2025)
- Longest winning run: Tuzla City (6 matches)
- Longest unbeaten run: Jedinstvo (15 matches)
- Longest winless run: Radnički (23 matches)
- Longest losing run: Radnički (16 matches)

The 2024–25 First League of the Federation of Bosnia and Herzegovina (known as the Wwin First League for sponsorship reasons) was the 25th season of the First League of the Federation of Bosnia and Herzegovina, the second tier football league of Bosnia and Herzegovina. The season began on 17 August 2024 and ended on 8 June 2025.

Stupčanica were crowned champions, winning their first championship title, but did not receive a license for the Premier League of Bosnia and Herzegovina.

== Teams ==
Team	Location	Stadium	Capacity
Bratstvo	Gračanica	Gradski Stadion Luke, Gračanica	3,000
Budućnost	Banovići	Stadion FK Budućnost	8,500
Čelik	Zenica	Bilino Polje Stadium	13,694
Goražde	Goražde	Midhat Drljević Stadium	1,500
Gornji Rahić	Gornji Rahić	SRC Gornji Rahić	1,190
Gradina	Srebrenik	Gradski Stadion, Srebrenik	5,000
Jedinstvo	Bihać	Pod Borićima Stadium	7,500
Radnički	Lukavac	Stadion Jošik	3,000
Radnik	Hadžići	Gradski Stadion, Hadžići	500
Stupčanica	Olovo	Danac Stadium	1,500
Tomislav	Tomislavgrad	Gradski stadion, Tomislav	2,000
TOŠK	Tešanj	Luke Stadium, Tešanj	7,000
Travnik	Travnik	Pirota Stadium	4,000
Tuzla City	Tuzla	Tušanj City Stadium	7,200
Zvijezda	Gradačac	Banja Ilidža	5,000

== League table ==
Pos	Team	Pld	W	D	L	GF	GA	GD	Pts	Promotion or relegation
1	Stupčanica (C)	28	16	6	6	50	29	+21	54	
2	Bratstvo Gračanica	28	15	1	12	38	38	0	46	
3	Čelik Zenica	28	13	6	9	40	29	+11	45	
4	Radnik Hadžići	28	12	9	7	41	31	+10	45	
5	Budućnost	28	12	7	9	42	33	+9	43	
6	Travnik	28	11	9	8	37	30	+7	42	
7	Tuzla City	28	12	6	10	33	33	0	42	
8	Tomislav	28	11	8	9	38	28	+10	41	
9	TOŠK Tešanj	28	11	7	10	41	38	+3	40	
10	Jedinstvo Bihać (O)	28	10	9	9	32	32	0	39	Qualification for the relegation play-offs
11	Gradina (R)	28	10	7	11	35	36	−1	37	Relegation to the Second League of FBiH
12	Goražde (R)	28	8	11	9	32	35	−3	35	Relegation to the Second League of FBiH
13	Zvijezda Gradačac (R)	28	10	3	15	43	40	+3	33	Relegation to the Second League of FBiH
14	Gornji Rahić (R)	28	8	7	13	43	56	−13	31	Relegation to the Second League of FBiH
15	Radnički Lukavac (R)	28	1	4	23	23	80	−57	7	Relegation to the Second League of FBiH

Source: Rezultati.com
Rules for classification: 1) Points; 2) Head-to-head points; 3) Head-to-head goal difference; 4) Head-to-head goals scored; 5) Head-to-head away goals scored (only if two teams); 6) Goal difference; 7) Goals scored; 8) Play-off.
(C) Champions; (O) Play-off winners; (R) Relegated

== Top goalscorers ==
Rank	Player	Club	Goals
1	(Bosnia and Herzegovina) Maid Jaganjac	Bratstvo	14
2	(Bosnia and Herzegovina) Anel Husić	Budućnost	13
2	(Bosnia and Herzegovina) Eldin Mehmedović	Gornji Rahić	13
2	(Serbia) Andreja Ristić	Radnik Hadžići	13
5	(Bosnia and Herzegovina) Eldin Fačić	Zvijezda	11
5	(Bosnia and Herzegovina) Ermin Huseinbašić	Tuzla City	11
5	(Bosnia and Herzegovina) Fijad Mehanović	Stupčanica	11
5	(Bosnia and Herzegovina) Kenan Salkanović	Jedinstvo Bihać	11
5	(Bosnia and Herzegovina) Dževad Sijamija	Tomislav	11
10	(Bosnia and Herzegovina) Hamza Gasal	Travnik	10

== See also ==
- 2024–25 Premier League of Bosnia and Herzegovina
- 2024–25 First League of the Republika Srpska
- 2024–25 Bosnia and Herzegovina Football Cup
