= 2021–22 First League of the Federation of Bosnia and Herzegovina =

First League of the Federation of Bosnia and Herzegovina
- Season: 2021–22
- Dates: 14 August 2021 – 5 June 2022
- Champions: Igman
- Promoted: Igman
- Relegated: Orašje (stepped out)
- Matches played: 240
- Goals scored: 627 (2.61 per match)
- Top goalscorer: Dženan Haračić (21 goals)
- Biggest home win: GOŠK 6–1 Gradina (3 October 2021)
- Biggest away win: Tomislav 3–5 TOŠK (5 June 2022)
- Highest scoring: Tomislav 3–5 TOŠK (5 June 2022)
- Longest winning run: GOŠK (8 matches)
- Longest unbeaten run: Igman (17 matches)
- Longest winless run: Radnik (14 matches)
- Longest losing run: Mladost (6 matches)

The 2021–22 First League of the Federation of Bosnia and Herzegovina (known as the m:tel First League for sponsorship reasons) was the 22nd season of the First League of the Federation of Bosnia and Herzegovina, the second tier football league of Bosnia and Herzegovina. The season began on 14 August 2021 and ended on 5 June 2022.

Igman Konjic were crowned champions, winning their first championship title and earning promotion to the Premier League of Bosnia and Herzegovina.

== Teams ==
Team	Location	Stadium	Capacity
Bratstvo	Gračanica	Gradski Stadion Luke, Gračanica	3,000
Budućnost	Banovići	Stadion FK Budućnost	8,500
Goražde	Goražde	Midhat Drljević Stadium	1,500
GOŠK	Gabela	Perica-Pero Pavlović Stadium	3,000
Gradina	Srebrenik	Gradski Stadion, Srebrenik	5,000
Igman	Konjic	Gradski Stadion, Konjic	5,000
Jedinstvo	Bihać	Pod Borićima Stadium	7,500
Mladost	Doboj, Kakanj	MGM Farm Arena	3,000
Orašje	Orašje	Gradski Stadion, Orašje	3,000
Radnik	Hadžići	Gradski Stadion, Hadžići	500
Rudar	Kakanj	Stadion Rudara	4,568
Tomislav	Tomislavgrad	Gradski stadion, Tomislav	2,000
TOŠK	Tešanj	Luke Stadium, Tešanj	7,000
Travnik	Travnik	Pirota Stadium	4,000
Vis Simm-Bau	Kosova, Maglaj	Grabovac Stadium	1,200
Zvijezda	Gradačac	Banja Ilidža	5,000

== League table ==
Pos	Team	Pld	W	D	L	GF	GA	GD	Pts	Promotion or relegation
1	Igman Konjic (C, P)	30	20	8	2	47	16	+31	68	Promotion to the Premijer Liga BiH
2	GOŠK Gabela	30	19	9	2	56	24	+32	66	
3	Budućnost	30	14	10	6	48	34	+14	52	
4	TOŠK Tešanj	30	14	10	6	46	32	+14	52	
5	Rudar Kakanj	30	15	7	8	40	35	+5	52	
6	Gradina	30	14	3	13	49	47	+2	45	
7	Bratstvo Gračanica	30	13	5	12	48	43	+5	44	
8	Orašje (Note: On 27 July 2022, Orašje stepped out of the First League of FBiH due to financial difficulties.) (R, D)	30	12	7	11	36	41	−5	43	Excluded from Bosnian professional football
9	Goražde	30	11	5	14	33	40	−7	38	
10	Zvijezda Gradačac	30	8	9	13	36	37	−1	33	
11	Vis Simm-Bau	30	8	8	14	31	33	−2	32	
12	Radnik Hadžići	30	6	13	11	23	35	−12	31	
13	Jedinstvo Bihać	30	8	5	17	34	56	−22	29	
14	Travnik	30	6	10	14	36	45	−9	28	
15	Mladost Doboj Kakanj	30	8	3	19	35	55	−20	27	
16	Tomislav (Note: Tomislav avoided relegation to the Second League of FBiH because of Orašje's stepping out.)	30	6	4	20	29	54	−25	22	

Source: sportdc.net
Rules for classification: 1) Points; 2) Head-to-head points; 3) Head-to-head goal difference; 4) Head-to-head goals scored; 5) Head-to-head away goals scored (only if two teams); 6) Goal difference; 7) Goals scored; 8) Play-off.
(C) Champions; (D) Disqualified; (P) Promoted; (R) Relegated

== Top goalscorers ==
Rank	Player	Club	Goals
1	(Bosnia and Herzegovina) Dženan Haračić	GOŠK	21
2	(Bosnia and Herzegovina) Ajdin Mujagić	TOŠK	13
2	(Bosnia and Herzegovina) Idriz Džafić	Rudar	13
4	(Bosnia and Herzegovina) Salko Nargalić	Orašje	11
4	(Bosnia and Herzegovina) Husein Poturalić	Bratstvo	11
6	(Bosnia and Herzegovina) Kemal Mujarić	Budućnost	10
6	(Bosnia and Herzegovina) Salko Jazvin	Jedinstvo	10
6	(Bosnia and Herzegovina) Selmir Mahmutović	TOŠK	10
6	(Bosnia and Herzegovina) Dino Kalesić	Vis Simm-Bau	10
10	(Bosnia and Herzegovina) Senad Kašić	Igman	9
10	(Bosnia and Herzegovina) Eldin Fačić	Zvijezda	9

== See also ==
- 2021–22 Premier League of Bosnia and Herzegovina
- 2021–22 First League of the Republika Srpska
- 2021–22 Bosnia and Herzegovina Football Cup
