= Armin Mahović =

Bosnian footballer

Personal information
- Date of birth: 28 November 1991 (age 34)
- Place of birth: Sarajevo, SFR Yugoslavia
- Height: 1.86 m (6 ft 1 in)
- Position: Forward

Team information
- Current team: USV Großarl

Senior career*
Years	Team	Apps	(Gls)
2008–2009	Olimpic Sarajevo		
2009–2010	Zeljeznicar		
2010–2012	Famos Hrasnica		
2012–2013	Bratstvo Gračanica	14	(0)
2012–2013	Goražde	12	(4)
2013–2014	Čapljina	15	(4)
2013–2014	Rudar Kakanj	12	(3)
2014–2015	Travnik	11	(0)
2014–2015	Goražde	10	(1)
2015	Brantford Galaxy		
2015–2017	Olimpic Sarajevo	43	(4)
2017–2018	Borac Banja Luka	12	(0)
2019–2022	SK Bischofshofen	27	(3)
2022–	USV Großarl		
- * Club domestic league appearances and goals as of 19 October 2025

Armin Mahović (born November 28, 1991) is a Bosnian footballer playing with Austrian side USV Großarl.

== Club career ==
=== Early career ===
Mahović began his career with both Olimpic Sarajevo and Zeljeznicar youth teams. In 2011, he joined the professional ranks by signing with Famos-SAŠK Napredak in the First League of the Federation of Bosnia and Herzegovina. After a season with Famos, he resumed playing in the Bosnian second-tier by signing with Bratstvo Gračanica. Mahović spent the remainder of the 2012–13 season with Goražde. The following season, he joinedČapljina. His tenure with Čapljina was short-lived as he signed with league rivals Rudar Kakanj in the winter transfer market. After the conclusion of the season, he left Rudar.

=== Premier League ===
Following his departure from Rudar, he signed with Premier League of Bosnia and Herzegovina side Travnik. However, his stint in the top-tier league was cut short as his contract with Travnik was mutually terminated during the winter break. In his debut season with Travnik, he appeared in 11 matches. Throughout his time with Travnik, he also made his debut in the country's national cup tournament.

Following his contract termination with Travnik, he played the remainder of the campaign with his former club Goražde in the country's second-tier league. He left Goražde near the season's conclusion as the club was experiencing financial difficulties.

=== Canada ===
In the summer of 2015, he played abroad in the Canadian Soccer League with Brantford Galaxy. He recorded his first goal for Brantford on July 12, 2015, against Scarborough SC. In his debut season in the Canadian circuit, the team failed to secure a playoff berth by finishing eleventh in the league's first division.

=== Olimpic Sarajevo ===
After a season abroad, he returned to Olimpic Sarajevo to play in Bosnia's premier league. He re-signed with Olimpic for the following season. After the club's relegation, his contract was extended. In his final season with Sarajevo, he participated in the 2017–18 Bosnia and Herzegovina Football Cup, where the club was eliminated in the quarterfinal by Zvijezda 09.

He left Sarajevo during the 2017-18 winter transfer market as his contract was mutually terminated. Shortly after, he returned to the Bosnian premier league to sign with Borac Banja Luka. Near the end of the season, Mahović received an injury, which ruled him out for the remainder of the season. In 2019, he was released from his contract with Borac Banja.

=== Austria ===
Mahović played in the Austrian Regionalliga with SK Bischofshofen in 2019. His tenure with Bischofshofen would last for three seasons. In 2023, he signed with USV Großarl in the Austrian Landesliga.
