= Dženan Haračić =

Bosnian footballer (born 1994)

Personal information
- Date of birth: 30 July 1994 (age 32)
- Place of birth: Bugojno, Bosnia and Herzegovina
- Height: 1.85 m (6 ft 1 in)
- Position: Centre-forward

Team information
- Current team: Travnik
- Number: 9

Youth career
- –2012: Iskra Bugojno

Senior career*
Years	Team	Apps	(Gls)
2012–2013	Iskra Bugojno	17	(5)
2013–2015	Slaven Belupo	3	(0)
2014	→ Koprivnica (loan)	3	(0)
2014	→ Segesta (loan)	11	(1)
2015	Zvijezda Gradačac	6	(0)
2015–2016	Koprivnica	6	(0)
2016–2017	Neretvanac Opuzen	5	(3)
2017–2018	Čapljina	30	(9)
2018–2020	Metalleghe-BSI	55	(32)
2020–2021	Jedinstvo Bihać	14	(6)
2021–2022	GOŠK Gabela	44	(33)
2022–2024	Željezničar	45	(6)
2024	Sloboda Tuzla	9	(0)
2025–	Travnik	26	(9)
- * Club domestic league appearances and goals as of 22 March 2026

Dženan Haračić (born 30 July 1994) is a Bosnian professional footballer who plays as a centre-forward for First League of FBiH club Travnik.

== Career ==
Haračić was born on 30 July 1994 in Bugojno. He progressed through all the youth ranks of hometown club Iskra, before moving to Croatian side Slaven Belupo in 2013. He then spent time on loan at Koprivnica and Segesta. Haračić went on to play for several clubs, including Zvijezda Gradačac, Neretvanac Opuzen, Čapljina, Metalleghe-BSI, Jedinstvo Bihać and GOŠK Gabela.

In the 2021–22 season, GOŠK finished second in the Bosnian second tier; Haračić played 28 games and scored 21 goals, finishing as the league's top scorer for a second season in a row.

In June 2022, Haračić signed with Željezničar.

== Honours ==
Individual

- First League of FBiH Top Goalscorer: 2020–21, 2021–22
