= Velibor Pudar =

Bosnian footballer (born 1964)

Personal information
- Full name: Velibor Pudar
- Date of birth: 22 November 1964 (age 61)
- Place of birth: Mostar, SR Bosnia and Herzegovina, SFR Yugoslavia
- Height: 1.93 m (6 ft 4 in)
- Position: Goalkeeper

Senior career*
Years	Team	Apps	(Gls)
1981–1987	Lokomotiva Mostar		
1987–1992	Velež Mostar	38	(0)
1992–1993	Apollon Athens	9	(0)
1993–1994	Čukarički		
1995	Sutjeska Nikšić	14	(0)
1995–1996	Jedinstvo Paraćin		
1996–1997	Palilulac Beograd		
1998	Vasalunds IF		
1999	TPV	6	(0)
2000	Leotar		
2000–2005	Velež Mostar	64	(0)

Managerial career
- 2008–2009: Bratstvo Gračanica
- 2009–2010: Igman Konjic
- 2017: Velež Mostar (Youth)
- 2024–2025: Kruševo
- * Club domestic league appearances and goals

Velibor Pudar (Serbian Cyrillic: Велибор Пудар; born 22 November 1964) is a Bosnian professional football manager and former player who played as a goalkeeper.

== Playing career ==
Born in Mostar, SR Bosnia and Herzegovina to Serb parents, Pudar played for Lokomotiva Mostar from where he moved to Velež Mostar in summer 1987. He played with Velež between 1987 and 1992 in the Yugoslav First League. With the beginning of the Bosnian War in 1992, he moved abroad where he played one season with Apollon Athens in the Alpha Ethniki.

Pudar moved to FR Yugoslavia in 1993, where he played for Čukarički, and with several other clubs, namely, Sutjeska Nikšić in the First League, Jedinstvo Paraćin and Palilulac Beograd. By the late 1990s, he also played in Sweden with Vasalunds IF and in Finland with TPV before returning to Bosnia and Herzegovina to play at Leotar. He finished his career at Velež in 2005.

== Managerial career ==
Pudar obtained the UEFA Pro Licence for coaching in 2005, after graduating in Belgrade's Higher School for Football. After early coaching experiences while still playing for Leotar and Velež, he managed Bratstvo Gračanica in the 2008–09 season. He then managed Igman Konjic in the 2009–10 season.

Pudar then worked as a goalkeeping coach of Saudi Arabian sides Al-Ittihad, Al Taawoun and Al-Khaleej, as well as GOŠK Gabela. As manager of Bosnian third tier club Kruševo, he led the side to an unexpected 2024–25 Bosnian Cup quarter-finals finish, defeating Sloboda Tuzla and Zvijezda Gradačac, before getting eliminated by Željezničar.

On 23 October 2025, Pudar was appointed as an assistant coach at hometown club Velež.

== Personal life ==
Velibor is the father of swimmer Lana Pudar, who competed at the 2020 and 2024 Summer Olympics, and who claimed gold in the women’s 200-metre butterfly at the 2022 European Aquatics Championships in Rome, Italy.
