= 2010–11 First League of the Federation of Bosnia and Herzegovina =

The 2010–11 First League of the Federation of Bosnia and Herzegovina was the 11th season of the First League of the Federation of Bosnia and Herzegovina, the second tier football league of Bosnia and Herzegovina.

== League table ==
Pos	Team	Pld	W	D	L	GF	GA	GD	Pts	Promotion or relegation
1	GOŠK Gabela (C, P)	30	16	8	6	38	21	+17	56	Promotion to Premijer Liga BiH
2	Čapljina	30	15	3	12	49	41	+8	48	
3	Iskra Bugojno	30	13	8	9	45	35	+10	47	
4	Krajina Cazin	30	14	5	11	41	31	+10	47	
5	Orašje	30	14	5	11	40	31	+9	47	
6	Jedinstvo Bihać	30	14	4	12	38	39	−1	46	
7	Goražde	30	14	3	13	50	39	+11	45	
8	Gradina	30	13	5	12	44	39	+5	44	
9	Krajišnik	30	13	5	12	41	40	+1	44	
10	Rudar Kakanj	30	11	10	9	46	44	+2	43	
11	SAŠK Napredak	30	13	4	13	48	49	−1	43	
12	Omladinac	30	13	3	14	37	39	−2	42	
13	Bosna Visoko (R)	30	12	5	13	39	44	−5	41	Relegation to Second League FBiH
14	Slaven Živinice (R)	30	10	4	16	27	42	−15	34	Relegation to Second League FBiH
15	Igman Konjic (R)	30	9	4	17	34	56	−22	31	Relegation to Second League FBiH
16	Radnik Hadžići (R)	30	4	8	18	26	53	−27	20	Relegation to Second League FBiH

Source: Futbol24.com
Rules for classification: 1) points; 2) goal difference; 3) number of goals scored.
(C) Champions; (P) Promoted; (R) Relegated
