= Darko Vojvodić =

Bosnian football manager (born 1970)

Personal information
- Date of birth: 8 May 1970 (age 56)
- Place of birth: Foča, SFR Yugoslavia
- Height: 1.80 m (5 ft 11 in)
- Position: Midfielder

Youth career
- Sutjeska Foča
- Proleter Teslić
- Željezničar

Senior career*
Years	Team	Apps	(Gls)
- Loznica
- Badnjevac
1995	Napredak Kruševac	10	(2)
1996	Radnički Kragujevac		
1997–2000	Sartid Smederevo	75	(14)
2000	Milicionar		
2001	Sutjeska Nikšić		
2002	Brotnjo	9	(0)
2002	Kozara Gradiška	17	(3)
2003–2004	Sloboda Tuzla	34	(6)
2004	Čelik Zenica	12	(0)
2005	Sloboda Tuzla	20	(2)
2006	Budućnost Banovići	7	(0)
2006–2008	Sloboda Tuzla	25	(0)

Managerial career
- 2009: Sutjeska Foča
- 2010: Proleter Teslić
- 2010–2011: Drina Zvornik
- 2011–2012: Sloboda Tuzla
- 2012–2014: Radnički Lukavac
- 2014–2015: GOŠK Gabela
- 2015: Slavija Sarajevo
- 2016: Travnik
- 2016–2017: Zvijezda Gradačac
- 2017: GOŠK Gabela
- 2017–2018: Sloga Simin Han
- 2018–2019: Borac Banja Luka
- 2019: Radnički 1923
- 2019–2020: Olimpik
- 2021: Vis Simm-Bau
- 2021–2022: Goražde
- 2022–2023: Sloboda Novi Grad
- 2023–2025: Famos Vojkovići
- 2025–2026: Sutjeska Foča
- 2026: GOŠK Gabela
- * Club domestic league appearances and goals

Darko Vojvodić (born 8 May 1970) is a Bosnian professional football manager and former player.

== Playing career ==
Vojvodić played with Radnički Kragujevac in the second half of the 1995–96 Second League of FR Yugoslavia season. Then he played with Sartid Smederevo in the 1998–99 First League of FR Yugoslavia season. In the 1999–2000 season, Vojvodić was the topscorer of Sartid in the league with nine goals. Next, he played with Montenegrin side Sutjeska Nikšić in the 2000–01 First League season, having scored three goals.

In 2002, he returned to Bosnia and Herzegovina and played with Sloboda Tuzla, Čelik Zenica and Budućnost Banovići in the Bosnian Premier League. He retired in 2008 while playing for Sloboda.

== Managerial career ==
After finishing his playing career, Vojvodić was a manager of a number of Bosnian clubs.

He started in 2009, managing Sutjeska Foča and finished the first half of the season at top of the First League of RS. Next he coached Proleter Teslić, from where he moved to Drina Zvornik in September 2010.

He also managed his former club Sloboda Tuzla, Radnički Lukavac, Slavija Sarajevo, Travnik, GOŠK Gabela, with whom he won the 2016–17 First League of FBiH, and Sloga Simin Han.

Vojvodić worked as the manager of Borac Banja Luka, a position he came on in March 2018. In the 2018–19 First League of RS season, on 11 May 2019, in a 1–3 away win against Rudar Prijedor, he got Borac promoted back to the Bosnian Premier League. On 5 June 2019, Vojvodić decided to leave Borac after stating that the club did not want him to be the clubs's manager in the next season.

On 5 September 2019, he was named new manager of Serbian First League club Radnički 1923, a team he previously played at and also captained. His first win as Radnički manager was in a 1–0 home league match against Zlatibor Čajetina on 8 September 2019. In November 2019, he was sacked from the position of Radnički manager.

On 13 December 2019, Vojvodić became the new manager of, at the time, First League of FBiH club Olimpik. In Vojvodić's first official game as Olimpik manager, his team drew 1–1, but later lost in a penalty shootout against Široki Brijeg in the quarter-finals of the 2019–20 Bosnian Cup on 4 March 2020. His first win as Olimpik's manager was in a 2–0 home league match against Slaven Živinice on 7 March 2020. On 26 May 2020, the 2019–20 First League of FBiH season ended abruptly due to the COVID-19 pandemic in Bosnia and Herzegovina and by default, Olimpik were crowned league champions and got promoted back to the Bosnian Premier League. On 5 September 2020, he was let go by the club and replaced by Esad Selimović.

On 10 March 2021, Vojvodić was named new manager of First League of FBiH club Vis Simm-Bau.

== Managerial statistics ==
As of match played 27 September 2026

Managerial record by team and tenure
Team	From	To	Record				
Team	From	To	G	W	D	L	Win %
Drina Zvornik	20 September 2010	13 March 2011	11	5	1	5	45.45
Sloboda Tuzla	5 October 2011	30 April 2012	15	4	2	9	26.67
Radnički Lukavac	19 September 2012	27 June 2014	41	19	12	10	46.34
GOŠK Gabela	17 October 2014	30 June 2015	20	12	6	2	60.00
Slavija Sarajevo	19 August 2015	8 December 2015	17	6	5	6	35.29
Travnik	January 2016	March 2016	4	0	3	1	0.00
Zvijezda Gradačac	15 May 2016	5 January 2017	20	10	4	6	50.00
GOŠK Gabela	7 January 2017	6 June 2017	15	9	4	2	60.00
Tuzla City	7 June 2017	29 January 2018	20	13	3	4	65.00
Borac Banja Luka	22 March 2018	5 June 2019	44	30	7	7	68.18
Radnički 1923	4 September 2019	4 November 2019	12	3	3	6	25.00
Olimpik	13 December 2019	4 September 2020	7	1	0	6	14.29
Vis Simm-Bau	10 March 2021	15 August 2021	14	3	3	8	21.43
Goražde	20 September 2021	30 June 2022	25	8	5	12	32.00
Sloboda Novi Grad	1 July 2022	5 January 2023	18	13	3	2	72.22
Famos Vojkovići	21 June 2023	5 September 2025	76	31	13	32	40.79
Sutjeska Foča	19 September 2025	8 June 2026	24	9	4	11	37.50
GOŠK Gabela	16 June 2026	28 September 2026	7	5	0	2	71.43
Total			390	181	78	131	46.41

== Honours ==
=== Manager ===
GOŠK Gabela

- First League of FBiH: 2016–17

Borac Banja Luka

- First League of RS: 2018–19

Olimpik

- First League of FBiH: 2019–20
