= Ajdin Mujagić =

Bosnian footballer

Personal information
- Full name: Ajdin Mujagić
- Date of birth: 3 January 1998 (age 28)
- Place of birth: Tešanj, Bosnia and Herzegovina
- Height: 1.89 m (6 ft 2 in)
- Position: Forward

Team information
- Current team: Kuching City (on loan from Johor Darul Ta'zim)

Youth career
- Borac Jelah
- –2015: Željezničar

Senior career*
Years	Team	Apps	(Gls)
2015–2018	Željezničar	12	(2)
2018	→ Travnik (loan)	9	(4)
2018	Mladost Doboj Kakanj	6	(0)
2019	TOŠK Tešanj	12	(2)
2019	Pajde Möhlin	9	(8)
2020	Igman Konjic	14	(0)
2021–2022	TOŠK Tešanj	54	(22)
2022–2023	Zvijezda Gradačac	31	(22)
2023–2025	Zrinski Osječko	24	(5)
2025	Sabah	22	(18)
2026	Johor Darul Ta'zim	9	(7)
2026—	→ Kuching City (loan)	0	(0)

International career
2013	Bosnia and Herzegovina U16		
2014–2015	Bosnia and Herzegovina U17		
2015	Bosnia and Herzegovina U18	12	(4)
2016	Bosnia and Herzegovina U19	6	(1)
- * Club domestic league appearances and goals as of 6 July 2026

Ajdin Mujagić (born 3 January 1998) is a Bosnian professional footballer who plays as a forward for Malaysia Super League club Kuching City, on loan from Johor Darul Ta'zim.

== Club career ==
=== Bosnia ===
==== Željezničar and loan to Travnik ====
Mujagić made his Premier League of Bosnia and Herzegovina debut for Željezničar on 25 October 2015 in a game against Čelik Zenica and scored on his debut. On 2 May 2016, he traveled to Italy to train with AS Roma alongside his teammates Edin Džeko, Miralem Pjanić and Ervin Zukanović until 6 May. In 2018, Mujagić was loaned out to Travnik where he showed his talent scoring four goals in eight league games that season.

==== Mladost Doboj Kakanj ====
After his loan at Travnik ended, Mujagić refused to extend his contract with Željezničar and signed with Mladost Doboj Kakanj in July 2018. At Mladost, he did not get much playing time as he played only six league games. In December 2018, only five months after joining Mladost, he left the club.

==== TOŠK Tešanj ====
On 9 January 2019, Mujagić signed with TOŠK Tešanj. He scored his first professional career hat-trick on 5 June 2022 in a 5–3 win over HNK Tomislav.

=== Switzerland ===
In the summer of 2019, he left TOŠK and signed for fifth-tier Swiss club Pajde Möhlin.

=== Return to Bosnia ===
==== Zvijezda Gradačac ====
In July 2022, Mujagić joined Zvijezda Gradačac. On 20 August, he scored two goals against Budućnost Banovići, which helped Zvijezda draw 2–2. In the end of the season, Mujagic became the top goalscorer of the First League of FBiH with 20 goals.

=== Croatia ===
==== Zrinski Osječko ====
In 2023, Mujagić joined Zrinski Osječko after the club promoted to First Football League. On 6 August 2023, he and Zrinski Osječko won the Memorijalni turnir - a friendly tournament held in Kuševac, he was the top goalscorer with 20 goals in the 2022–23 season.

=== Malaysia ===
==== Sabah ====
In July 2025, Mujagić moved to Southeast Asia to sign for Malaysia Super League club Sabah. In the second leg of the 2024–25 Malaysia Cup quarter-finals match against Kelantan TRW on 29 October, he scored a hat-trick in a 3–1 win, which secured a 5–2 on aggregate, putting his team through to the semi-finals. In the semi-finals, Mujagić was instrumental in both legs against Selangor where he scored a brace in both games, thus putting his team on the verge of advancing to the 2025 Malaysia Cup final. With 18 goals and 2 assists in 22 appearances across all competitions,

==== Johor Darul Ta'zim ====
Due to Sabah facing salary and financial issues, Mujagić left the club and signed for Johor Darul Ta'zim on 28 January 2026. On 13 February, He scored a hat-trick and also recorded a brace of assists in a 5–0 win over Melaka in the 2025 Malaysia FA Cup quarter-finals match on 13 February.

==== Kuching City ====
On 6 July 2026, Mujagić left Johor to sign a one-year loan deal with Sarawak Kuching City, bolstering the team's attack as they seek to strengthen their depth after qualifying for continental competitions.

== Honours ==
=== Club ===
Željezničar

- Bosnian Cup: 2017–18

Zrinski Osječko

- Medulin Cup: 2024

=== Individual ===
- First League of FBiH top goalscorer: 2022–23 (20 goals)
