= Armin Imamović =

Bosnian footballer (born 2000)

Personal information
- Full name: Armin Imamović
- Date of birth: 17 February 2000 (age 26)
- Place of birth: Tuzla, Bosnia and Herzegovina
- Height: 1.76 m (5 ft 9 1/2 in)
- Position: Left-back

Team information
- Current team: Velež Mostar
- Number: 23

Youth career
- 2012–2014: Sloboda Tuzla
- 2014–2019: Sarajevo

Senior career*
Years	Team	Apps	(Gls)
2019–2023	Sarajevo	4	(0)
2020–2021	→ Olimpik (loan)	17	(0)
2022	→ Zvijezda Gradačac (loan)	14	(1)
2022–2023	→ Rudar Kakanj (loan)	26	(13)
2023–2024	Mornar	20	(0)
2024–2026	Arsenal Tivat	41	(3)
2026–	Velež Mostar	6	(0)

International career
2015	Bosnia and Herzegovina U15	2	(1)
2016	Bosnia and Herzegovina U16	3	(0)
2016–2017	Bosnia and Herzegovina U17	16	(3)
2018	Bosnia and Herzegovina U18	8	(2)
- * Club domestic league appearances and goals as of 6 September 2026

Armin Imamović (born 17 February 2000) is a Bosnian professional footballer who plays as a left-back for Bosnian Premier League club Velež Mostar. Before that, he played for Sarajevo, Mornar and Arsenal Tivat.

== Career statistics ==
=== Club ===
As of match played 6 September 2026

Appearances and goals by club, season and competition
Club	Season	League			National cup (Note: Includes Bosnian Cup, Montenegrin Cup)		Continental		Other		Total	
Club	Season	League	Apps	Goals	Apps	Goals	Apps	Goals	Apps	Goals	Apps	Goals
Olimpik Sarajevo (loan)	2020–21	Bosnian Premier League	17	0	1	0	—		—		18	0
Sarajevo	2021–22	Bosnian Premier League	4	0	1	0	0	0	—		5	0
Zvijezda Gradačac (loan)	2021–22	First League of FBiH	14	1	—		—		—		14	1
Rudar Kakanj (loan)	2021–22	First League of FBiH	26	13	2	4	—		—		28	17
Mornar	2023–24	Montenegrin First League	20	0	2	0	—		—		22	0
Arsenal Tivat	2024–25	Montenegrin First League	26	2	1	0	—		2 (Note: Appearances in 2024–25 Montenegrin First League play-off)	0	29	2
Arsenal Tivat	2025–26	Montenegrin First League	15	1	—		—		—		15	1
Arsenal Tivat	Total		41	3	1	0	—		2	0	44	3
Velež Mostar	2026–27	Bosnian Premier League	6	0	0	0	—		—		6	0
Career total			128	17	7	4	0	0	2	0	137	21

== Honours ==
Sarajevo

- Bosnian Premier League: 2019–20
