= Nermin Jamak =

Bosnian footballer

Personal information
- Full name: Nermin Jamak
- Date of birth: 25 August 1986 (age 40)
- Place of birth: Sarajevo, SFR Yugoslavia
- Height: 1.79 m (5 ft 10 in)
- Position: Midfielder

Team information
- Current team: Vis Simm-Bau
- Number: 24

Youth career
- –2005: Željezničar

Senior career*
Years	Team	Apps	(Gls)
2005–2008	Željezničar	21	(0)
2009–2010	Čelik Zenica	39	(1)
2011–2014	Željezničar	88	(4)
2014–2015	Osijek	24	(0)
2015–2016	Sūduva	49	(5)
2017–2018	Zrinjski Mostar	27	(0)
2018–2020	Čelik Zenica	42	(2)
2020	Željezničar	4	(0)
2020–	Vis Simm-Bau	3	(0)
- * Club domestic league appearances and goals as of 17:33, 24 March 2021 (UTC)

Nermin Jamak (born 25 August 1986) is a Bosnian professional footballer who plays as a midfielder for First League of FBiH club Vis Simm-Bau.

== Career ==
Jamak went through the entire Željezničar academy, signing a professional contract and debuting in 2005 for the first team, alongside Edin Džeko. He debuted for the club in a game vs. NK Posušje on 6 August 2005.

In January 2009 he left his first club, and, after negotiations with Croatian side RNK Split fell through, he signed for Čelik Zenica.

He spent 2 years in Zenica, establishing himself as a first team player, before returning to Željezničar in January 2011, when his contract expired. Jamak remained there until late summer 2014 when he, after playing UEFA Europa League qualifiers for Željezničar, moved abroad, to 1. HNL side Osijek, debuting for his new club in a 0–1 home loss against Rijeka on 13 September 2014, coming in for Ivan Baraban in the second half. After Osijek, Jamak also played for Lithuanian side Sūduva and Zrinjski Mostar back in Bosnia. He then came back to Čelik in July 2018, becoming one of the best players of the club and of the whole league as well. Jamak was let go by the club on 21 January 2020.

On 14 February 2020, he came back to Željezničar for a second time, signing a one-and-a-half-year contract with the club. He played his first official match after his second return to Željezničar on 22 February 2020, a 0–0 league draw against Radnik Bijeljina on 22 February 2020. Jamak terminated his contract with Željezničar and left the club on 18 December 2020.

Eight days after leaving Željezničar, on 26 December, Jamak signed a contract with First League of FBiH club Vis Simm-Bau.

== Honours ==
Željezničar

- Bosnian Premier League: 2011–12, 2012–13
- Bosnian Cup: 2010–11, 2011–12

Zrinjski Mostar

- Bosnian Premier League: 2016–17, 2017–18
