= Ratko Ninković =

Bosnian football manager (born 1967)

Personal information
- Date of birth: 16 April 1967 (age 59)
- Place of birth: Višegrad, SFR Yugoslavia

Youth career
- –1985: Željezničar

Senior career*
Years	Team	Apps	(Gls)
1985–1991	Željezničar		
- Adelaide City
- Penang
	Sparta	0	(0)
- Spijkenisse

Managerial career
- 2000–2002: Famos Hrasnica
- 2005–2006: Željezničar
- 2006–2007: Brotnjo
- 2007–2009: Zvijezda Gradačac
- 2010–2011: Segesta
- 2012–2017: HAŠK
- 2018: Sloga Simin Han
- 2019–2020: Maksimir
- * Club domestic league appearances and goals

Ratko Ninković (born 16 April 1967) is a Bosnian professional football manager and former player.

== Playing career ==
Ninković started his professional career at Željezničar in which he has spent six years, from 1985 until 1991. After that, he played football for Adelaide City in Australia, Penang in Malaysia and Sparta Rotterdam and Spijkenisse in the Netherlands, where he ended his career in 1999.

== Managerial career ==
After finishing his career, Ninković returned to Bosnia and Herzegovina and was manager of Famos Hrasnica for two seasons, and then a coach in the Željezničar youth team. In 2005, he was named manager of the Željezničar first team, but did not stay there for long as he stepped down in March 2006. After Željezničar, Ninković became the new manager of Croatian club Segesta on 5 July 2010. He left Segesta in January 2011.

Ninković was then appointed as HAŠK manager in February 2012, staying there until October 2017. After HAŠK, he was manager for two months at Tuzla City (back then still known as Sloga Simin Han) in 2018. On 7 July 2019, he was next appointed at 3. HNL club Maksimir.

== Honours ==
=== Manager ===
Zvijezda Gradačac

- First League of FBiH: 2007–08
