= 2008–09 First League of the Federation of Bosnia and Herzegovina =

The 2008–09 First League of the Federation of Bosnia and Herzegovina season was the ninth since its establishment.

== Clubs and stadiums ==
Club	City	Stadium	Capacity	2007–08 season
Čapljina	Čapljina			Second League
Krajina	Cazin			Second League
Olimpik	Sarajevo			Second League
Omladinac	Mionica, Gradačac			Second League
Vitez	Vitez			Second League
Troglav	Livno	Zgona	5,000	Second League

== League standings ==
Pos	Team	Pld	W	D	L	GF	GA	GD	Pts	Promotion or relegation
1	Olimpic (C, P)	30	19	3	8	45	25	+20	60	Promotion to Premijer Liga BiH
2	Rudar Kakanj	30	16	5	9	45	26	+19	53	
3	Bosna	30	15	4	11	47	26	+21	49	
4	Jedinstvo Bihać	30	15	4	11	46	40	+6	49	
5	Budućnost	30	16	1	13	43	37	+6	49	
6	GOŠK Gabela	30	14	4	12	42	36	+6	46	
7	Iskra	30	15	1	14	45	43	+2	46	
8	SAŠK Napredak	30	14	3	13	40	34	+6	45	
9	Omladinac	30	14	2	14	38	36	+2	44	
10	Žepče	30	14	1	15	42	32	+10	43	
11	Vitez	30	13	4	13	33	46	−13	43	
12	Troglav	30	12	3	15	37	52	−15	39	
13	Čapljina	30	12	3	15	35	57	−22	39	
14	Krajina (R)	30	11	4	15	34	46	−12	37	Relegation to Second League FBiH
15	Bratstvo Gračanica (R)	30	10	6	14	27	32	−5	36	Relegation to Second League FBiH
16	Ozren (R)	30	3	6	21	23	54	−31	15	Relegation to Second League FBiH

Source: RSSSF.org
Rules for classification: 1) points; 2) goal difference; 3) number of goals scored.
(C) Champions; (P) Promoted; (R) Relegated
