= Nusret Muslimović =

Bosnian football manager (born 1975)

Personal information
- Date of birth: 25 February 1975 (age 51)
- Place of birth: Tuzla, SFR Yugoslavia
- Height: 1.78 m (5 ft 10 in)
- Position: Defender

Youth career
- Sloboda Tuzla

Senior career*
Years	Team	Apps	(Gls)
–2007	Sloboda Tuzla		
2007–2011	Bratstvo Gračanica		

Managerial career
- 2012–2013: Bratstvo Gračanica
- 2016–2017: Bratstvo Gračanica
- 2017–2018: Bratstvo Gračanica
- 2019: TOŠK Tešanj
- 2020: Jedinstvo Brčko
- 2022–2023: Bratstvo Gračanica
- 2025: Bratstvo Gračanica
- * Club domestic league appearances and goals

Nusret Muslimović (born 25 February 1975) is a Bosnian professional football manager and former player.

As a player, he played for Sloboda Tuzla and Bratstvo Gračanica, while as a manager, Muslimović managed Bratstvo, TOŠK Tešanj and Jedinstvo Brčko.

== Managerial statistics ==
As of match played 8 June 2025

Managerial record by team and tenure
Team	From	To	Record							
Team	From	To	G	W	D	L	GF	GA	GD	Win %
Bratstvo Gračanica	1 July 2012	27 June 2013	28	12	6	10	34	28	+6	42.86
Bratstvo Gračanica	1 July 2016	6 January 2017	16	7	4	5	20	16	+4	43.75
Bratstvo Gračanica	2 May 2017	14 June 2018	38	18	5	15	67	52	+15	47.37
TOŠK Tešanj	1 July 2019	1 September 2019	4	3	0	1	6	3	+3	75.00
Jedinstvo Brčko	9 March 2020	30 June 2020	0	0	0	0	0	0	+0	—
Bratstvo Gračanica	6 July 2022	30 June 2023	30	10	6	14	42	43	−1	33.33
Bratstvo Gračanica	2 May 2025	16 August 2025	7	4	0	3	8	9	−1	57.14
Total			123	54	21	48	177	151	+26	43.90

== Honours ==
=== Player ===
Bratstvo Gračanica

- Second League of FBiH: 2010–11 (North)
