= Ljuca =

Ljuca is a surname. People with the surname include:

- Ersid Ljuca, Kosovo Albanian basketball player
- Sedin Ljuca, Bosnian footballer
