= 2007–08 First League of the Federation of Bosnia and Herzegovina =

Football league season

The 2007–08 First League of the Federation of Bosnia and Herzegovina season was the eighth since its establishment.

== Clubs and stadiums ==
Location of clubs in FBiH First League 2007-08

== League standings ==
Pos	Team	Pld	W	D	L	GF	GA	GD	Pts	Promotion or relegation
1	Zvijezda (C, P)	30	21	6	3	56	11	+45	69	Promotion to Premijer Liga BiH
2	GOŠK Gabela	30	16	1	13	43	35	+8	49	
3	Rudar Kakanj	30	14	4	12	44	39	+5	46	
4	Bratstvo Gračanica	30	13	6	11	37	31	+6	45	
5	Budućnost	30	13	5	12	39	30	+9	44	
6	Iskra	30	13	5	12	40	33	+7	44	
7	SAŠK Napredak	30	13	5	12	36	31	+5	44	
8	Troglav	30	13	5	12	36	31	+5	44	
9	Ozren	30	13	5	12	38	36	+2	44	
10	Bosna	30	13	4	13	41	39	+2	43	
11	Drinovci (R)	30	13	4	13	29	36	−7	43	Relegation to Second League FBiH
12	Radnički Lukavac (R)	30	13	4	13	34	43	−9	43	Relegation to Second League FBiH
13	Igman (R)	30	11	8	11	38	41	−3	41	Relegation to Second League FBiH
14	Gradina Srebrenik (R)	30	8	5	17	26	49	−23	29	Relegation to Second League FBiH
15	Kreševo-Stanić (R)	30	7	7	16	28	49	−21	28	Relegation to Second League FBiH
16	Brotnjo (R)	30	8	1	21	30	62	−32	25	Relegation to Second League FBiH

Source: RSSSF.org
Rules for classification: 1) points; 2) goal difference; 3) number of goals scored.
(C) Champions; (P) Promoted; (R) Relegated
