= Emir Tufek =

Bosnian footballer (born 1966)

Personal information
- Date of birth: 4 October 1966 (age 60)
- Place of birth: Jablanica, SFR Yugoslavia
- Position: Midfielder

Team information
- Current team: Velež Mostar (youth school director)

Youth career
- 1973–1981: Turbina Jablanica
- 1981–1984: Velež Mostar

Senior career*
| Years | Team | Apps | (Gls) |
| 1984–1992 | Velež Mostar | 116 | (12) |
| 1992 | Varteks Varaždin | 11 | (1) |
| 1993 | Belišće | 14 | (3) |
| 1993–1994 | Radnik Velika Gorica | 14 | (1) |
| 1993–1995 | SpVgg Beckum | 35 | (8) |
| 1995–1996 | Türkiyemspor Berlin | 27 | (2) |
| 1996–1997 | Turbina Jablanica | 26 | (4) |
| 1997–1998 | Sarajevo | 5 | (2) |
| Total | | 186 | (23) |

Managerial career
- 2008: Velež Mostar
- 2014: Zvijezda Gradačac
- 2019: Igman Konjic
- * Club domestic league appearances and goals

Emir Tufek (born 4 October 1966) is a Bosnian professional football manager and former player who played as a midfielder. He is the current director of the youth school of Bosnian Premier League club Velež Mostar.

== Managerial career ==
Tufek took the reins at Zvijezda Gradačac in January 2014, replacing Denis Taletović. In October 2014, he was named assistant to manager Meho Kodro at Sarajevo. He replaced Nedim Jusufbegović as manager of Igman Konjic in May 2019.

== Managerial statistics ==
As of match played 1 June 2019

Managerial record by team and tenure
| Team | From | To | Record | | | | |
| Team | From | To | G | W | D | L | Win % |
|---|---|---|---|---|---|---|---|
| Velež Mostar | 4 July 2008 | 24 August 2008 | 4 | 0 | 1 | 3 | 0.00 |
| Zvijezda Gradačac | 10 January 2014 | 6 April 2014 | 6 | 1 | 0 | 5 | 16.67 |
| Igman Konjic | 13 May 2019 | 30 June 2019 | 4 | 2 | 1 | 1 | 50.00 |
| Total | | | 14 | 3 | 2 | 9 | 21.43 |

== Honours ==
=== Player ===
Velež Mostar

- Yugoslav Cup: 1985–86

Sarajevo

- Bosnian Cup: 1997–98
- Bosnian Supercup: 1997
