= NK Slaven Živinice =

Slaven Živinice
- Full name: Nogometni klub Slaven Živinice
- Founded: 1936
- Ground: Gradski Stadion, Živinice
- Capacity: 500
- Chairman: Edin Šabanović
- Manager: Mirza Salihović
- League: Second League of FBiH
- 2020–21: Second League of FBiH, 16th (relegated)
Home colours	Away colours

Nogometni klub Slaven Živinice, commonly known as Slaven Živinice or just Slaven is a professional association football club based in the city of Živinice that is situated in Bosnia and Herzegovina.

Slaven currently plays in the Second League of the Federation of Bosnia and Herzegovina (Group North) and plays its home matches at the Gradski Stadion (City Stadium) in Živinice, which has a capacity of 500 seats.

== Honours ==
=== Domestic ===
==== League ====
- Second League of the Federation of Bosnia and Herzegovina:
  - Winners (2): 2008–09 (north), 2016–17 (north)
