= Konjic City Stadium =

Association football stadium, Bosnia and Herzegovina

City Stadium Konjic
- Stadion Drecelj
- Interactive map of City Stadium Konjic
- Full name: City Stadium Konjic, Drecelj
- Address: Konjic; Bosnia and Herzegovina
- Location: Drecelj bb, Konjic 88400, Bosnia and Herzegovina
- Coordinates: 43.658621°N 17.949823°E
- Owner: City of Konjic
- Operator: FK Igman
- Capacity: 5,000
- Surface: grass

Construction
- Renovated: 2023
- Expanded: 2023

Tenant
- FK Igman

Konjic City Stadium (Serbo-Croatian: Gradski stadion Konjic), also called Stadium Drecelj, is a multi-purpose stadium in Konjic, Bosnia and Herzegovina. It is the home stadium of Bosnian Premier League club FK Igman from Konjic. The stadium has a capacity to hold 5,000 spectators.
