= NK Omladinac Mionica =

- Full name: Nogometni Klub Omladinac Mionica
- Nickname(s): Alčaci
- Founded: 1968; 57 years ago
- Ground: Stadion Lipik
- Capacity: 1,300
- League: Second League FBiH
- 2012–13: 15th
- Website: http://nk-omladinac.page.tl/
Home colours	Away colours

Nogometni Klub Omladinac Mionica (English: Football Club Omladinac Mionica), commonly referred to as NK Omladinac Mionica or simply Omladinac Mionica, is a Bosnian football club from the town of Mionica near Gradačac, which currently plays in the Second League FBiH.
