= BFK Vis Simm-Bau =

- Full name: Bosanski fudbalski klub Vis Simm-Bau
- Founded: 1975; 51 years ago
- Dissolved: 2024; 2 years ago
- Ground: Grabovac Stadium
- Capacity: 1,200
- Chairman: Mirza Mujkanović
- Manager: Vacant
- League: First League of FBIH
- 2023–24: First League of FBIH, 8th of 16
Home colours	Away colours

Bosanski fudbalski klub Vis Simm-Bau (English: Bosnian Football Club Vis Simm-Bau) was a professional association football club from the village of Kosova near Maglaj, Bosnia and Herzegovina.

Vis Simm-Bau currently played in the First League of the Federation of Bosnia and Herzegovina after getting promoted from the Second League of the Federation of Bosnia and Herzegovina (Group Center) in the 2019–20 season. The club played its home matches on the Grabovac Stadium which has a capacity of 1,200 seats.

Until 2021, the club was called Nogometni klub Vis Simm-Bau (Football Club Simm-Bau).

== Honours ==
=== Domestic ===
==== League ====
- Second League of the Federation of Bosnia and Herzegovina:
  - Winners (1): 2019–20 (center)
- League of Zenica-Doboj Canton:
  - Winners (1): 2017–18

== Club officials ==
=== Coaching staff ===
Name	Role
Vacant	Head coach
(Bosnia and Herzegovina) Asim Hrnjić	Assistant coach

=== Other information ===
President	(Bosnia and Herzegovina) Mirza Mujkanović
Head coach	Vacant

Source: NK Vis Simm-Bau at sportsport.ba

== Managerial history ==
- (Bosnia and Herzegovina) Ekrem Bradarić (1 February 2019 – 30 June 2019)
- (Bosnia and Herzegovina) Ajdin Mrguda (1 August 2019 – 30 December 2019)
- (Bosnia and Herzegovina) Jasmin Džidić (1 February 2020 – 21 September 2020)
- (Bosnia and Herzegovina) Ajdin Mrguda (21 September 2020 – 8 March 2021)
- (Bosnia and Herzegovina) Darko Vojvodić (10 March 2021 – 15 August 2021)
- (Bosnia and Herzegovina) Dženan Hošić (17 August 2021 – 7 November 2021)
- (Bosnia and Herzegovina) Dario Damjanović (1 January 2022 – 1 June 2022)
- (Bosnia and Herzegovina) Jasmin Džidić (18 July 2022 – 15 May 2023)
- (Bosnia and Herzegovina) Nebojša Đekanović (16 May 2023 – 3 June 2024)
