= FK Goražde =

- Full name: Fudbalski klub Goražde
- Founded: 1918
- Ground: Stadion Midhat Drljević, Goražde
- Capacity: 1,500
- President: Nedim Kurtović
- Manager: Nihad Nalbantić
- League: Second League of FBiH (Center)
- 2024–25: First League of FBiH, 12th of 15 (relegated)

Fudbalski klub Goražde is a professional association football club based in the city of Goražde in Bosnia and Herzegovina. The club was founded in 1918.

Goražde plays in the Second League of the Federation of Bosnia and Herzegovina, the third level of football in the country, and plays its home matches at the Midhat Drljević Stadium, which has a capacity of 1,500.

== History ==
The first football club in Goražde was established in 1918 and it was named Herceg Stjepan, after Herceg Stjepan Vukčić Kosača, who lived between 1404 and 1466 and was one of the last rulers of Herzegovina. In 1922, the club changed its name to GOŠK who played their first match against Jugović from Foča.

The club kept that name until the Second World War. After the city was liberated, in 1946, Fudbalski klub Bratstvo (translated to Brotherhood) was founded, but it soon renamed itself to Sloga and keeps that name until 1952, before renaming it to Pobjeda (translated to Win). It kept that name until 1957, when Pobjeda was split in two clubs; GOŠK and Radnički. Both clubs existed until 1960, when those two merged in today's FK Goražde.

Currently, Goražde plays in Bosnia and Herzegovina's second tier-First League of the Federation of Bosnia and Herzegovina and has been a stable First League club since its third promotion in 2018. The two other promotions came in 2009 and 2014 respectively.

== Honours ==
=== Domestic ===
==== League ====
- Second League of the Federation of Bosnia and Herzegovina:
  - Winners (3): 2008–09 (center), 2013–14 (center), 2017–18 (center)

== Club seasons ==
| Season | League | | | | | | | | | Cup | Europe |
| Season | Division | P | W | D | L | F | A | Pts | Pos | Cup | Europe |
|---|---|---|---|---|---|---|---|---|---|---|---|
| 1997–98 | Second League of FBiH – South | 22 | 10 | 1 | 11 | 22 | 39 | 31 | 8th | 1/8 | |
| 1998–99 | First "B" League | 22 | 2 | 3 | 17 | 18 | 59 | 9 | 16th ↓ | | |
Current format of Premier League of Bosnia and Herzegovina
| 2003–04 | Second League of FBiH – South | 30 | 11 | 6 | 13 | 35 | 41 | 39 | 11th | 1/16 | |
| 2009–10 | First League of FBiH | 30 | 12 | 4 | 14 | 32 | 40 | 40 | 14th | | |
| 2010–11 | First League of FBiH | 30 | 14 | 3 | 13 | 50 | 39 | 45 | 7th | | |
| 2011–12 | First League of FBiH | 30 | 13 | 3 | 14 | 38 | 43 | 42 | 9th | | |
| 2012–13 | First League of FBiH | 28 | 9 | 5 | 14 | 35 | 46 | 32 | 14th ↓ | | |
| 2013–14 | Second League of FBiH – Center | | | | | | | | ↑ | | |
| 2014–15 | First League of FBiH | 30 | 14 | 8 | 8 | 33 | 19 | 50 | 5th | 1/16 | |
| 2015–16 | First League of FBiH | 30 | 13 | 3 | 14 | 31 | 31 | 42 | 11th | 1/16 | |
| 2016–17 | First League of FBiH | 30 | 12 | 7 | 11 | 35 | 32 | 43 | 12th ↓ | 1/8 | |
| 2017–18 | Second League of FBiH – Center | 28 | 20 | 3 | 5 | 56 | 19 | 63 | 1st ↑ | | |
| 2018–19 | First League of FBiH | 30 | 13 | 5 | 12 | 48 | 36 | 44 | 4th | 1/16 | |
| 2019–20 | First League of FBiH | 16 | 8 | 4 | 4 | 27 | 15 | 28 | 3rd | | |
| 2020–21 | First League of FBiH | 30 | 14 | 7 | 9 | 43 | 37 | 49 | 4th | 1/8 | |
| 2021–22 | First League of FBiH | 30 | 11 | 5 | 14 | 33 | 40 | 38 | 9th | 1/16 | |
| 2022–23 | First League of FBiH | 30 | 14 | 7 | 9 | 41 | 31 | 49 | 4th | | |
| 2023–24 | First League of FBiH | 30 | 12 | 7 | 11 | 36 | 29 | 43 | 7th | 1/16 | |
| 2024–25 | First League of FBiH | 28 | 8 | 11 | 9 | 32 | 35 | 35 | 12th ↓ | | |
