= NK Bratstvo Gračanica =

Bratstvo Gračanica
- Full name: Nogometni klub Bratstvo Gračanica
- Founded: 1945; 81 years ago
- Ground: Stadion Luke, Gračanica
- Capacity: 5,200
- Chairman: Nermin Avdagić
- Manager: Dalibor Ignjić
- League: First League of FBiH
- 2025–26: First League of FBiH, 12th of 14
Home colours	Away colours

Nogometni klub Bratstvo Gračanica or simply NK Bratstvo Gračanica is a professional association football club from the city of Gračanica that is situated in Bosnia and Herzegovina.

Bratstvo currently plays in the First League of the Federation of Bosnia and Herzegovina and plays its home matches on the Luke Stadium in Gračanica, which has a capacity of 3,000 seats.

== Honours ==
=== Domestic ===
==== League ====
- First League of the Federation of Bosnia and Herzegovina:
  - Runners-up (1): 2024–25
- Second League of the Federation of Bosnia and Herzegovina:
  - Winners (2): 2006–07 (north), 2010–11 (north)

== Club seasons ==
Season	League									Cup	Europe
Season	Division	P	W	D	L	F	A	Pts	Pos	Cup	Europe
2007–08	First League of FBiH	30	13	6	11	37	31	45	4th	R2	
2008–09	First League of FBiH	30	10	6	14	27	32	36	15th ↓		
2011–12	First League of FBiH	30	14	7	9	63	30	49	6th		
2012–13	First League of FBiH	30	12	6	10	34	28	42	5th		
2013–14	First League of FBiH	30	16	5	9	55	32	53	3rd	R2	
2014–15	First League of FBiH	30	16	5	9	42	28	53	3rd	R1	
2015–16	First League of FBiH	30	14	4	12	38	30	46	6th	R2	
2016–17	First League of FBiH	30	13	6	11	43	34	45	7th	R1	
2017–18	First League of FBiH	30	14	3	13	50	42	45	6th	R2	
2018–19	First League of FBiH	30	13	3	14	36	37	42	10th		
2019–20	First League of FBiH	16	6	2	8	24	29	20	12th	R1	
2020–21	First League of FBiH	30	14	6	10	43	30	48	6th		
2021–22	First League of FBiH	30	13	5	12	48	43	44	7th		
2022–23	First League of FBiH	30	10	6	14	42	43	36	12th		
2023–24	First League of FBiH	30	16	4	10	43	36	52	3rd		
2024–25	First League of FBiH	28	15	1	12	38	38	46	2nd	R1	
2025–26	First League of FBiH	26	7	10	9	26	28	31	12th		

== Managerial history ==
- (Bosnia and Herzegovina) Velibor Pudar (13 Aug 2008 – 30 June 2009)
- (Bosnia and Herzegovina) Nusret Muslimović (1 July 2012 – 27 June 2013)
- (Bosnia and Herzegovina) Denis Sadiković (1 July 2013 – 30 June 2014)
- (Bosnia and Herzegovina) Fuad Grbešić (5 July 2014 – 25 October 2014)
- (Bosnia and Herzegovina) Zoran Ćurguz (15 January 2015 – 11 May 2015)
- (Bosnia and Herzegovina) Irfan Džindić (13 May 2015 – 30 June 2016)
- (Bosnia and Herzegovina) Nusret Muslimović (1 July 2016 – 6 January 2017)
- (Bosnia and Herzegovina) Denis Sadiković (16 January 2017 – 1 May 2017)
- (Bosnia and Herzegovina) Nusret Muslimović (2 May 2017 – 14 June 2018)
- (Bosnia and Herzegovina) Nikola Nikić (20 June 2018 – 6 July 2022)
- (Bosnia and Herzegovina) Nusret Muslimović (6 July 2022 – 30 June 2023)
- (Bosnia and Herzegovina) Nikola Nikić (1 July 2023 – 10 January 2024)
- (Bosnia and Herzegovina) Faruk Kulović (19 January 2024 – 25 October 2024)
- (Bosnia and Herzegovina) Nikola Nikić (25 October 2024 – 23 December 2024)
- (Bosnia and Herzegovina) Dalibor Ignjić (30 December 2024 – 30 April 2025)
- (Bosnia and Herzegovina) Nusret Muslimović (2 May 2025 – 16 August 2025)
- (Bosnia and Herzegovina) Jasmin Moranjkić (17 August 2025 – 27 April 2026)
- (Bosnia and Herzegovina) Amir Selimović (28 April 2026 – 26 June 2026)
- (Bosnia and Herzegovina) Dalibor Ignjić (26 June 2026 – present)
