= FK Igman Konjic =

Football club in Bosnia and Herzegovina

Igman Konjic
- Full name: Fudbalski klub Igman Konjic
- Nicknames: Romantičari s Neretve, Beštije
- Founded: 1920; 106 years ago
- Ground: Konjic City Stadium
- Capacity: 5,000
- Owner: Igman
- President: Orhan Tucović
- Manager: Jadranko Bogičević
- League: First League of FBiH
- 2025–26: First League of FBiH, 10th of 14
- Website: fkigman.com
Home colours	Away colours

Fudbalski klub Igman Konjic (English: Football Club Igman Konjic), commonly referred to as simply Igman, is a professional association football club from the city of Konjic that is situated in Bosnia and Herzegovina.

Igman currently plays in the First League of the Federation of Bosnia and Herzegovina and plays its home matches on the Konjic City Stadium, which has a capacity of 5,000 seats.

== Honours ==
=== Domestic ===
==== League ====
- First League of the Federation of Bosnia and Herzegovina:
  - Winners (1): 2021–22
- Second League of the Federation of Bosnia and Herzegovina:
  - Winners (5): 2005–06 (south), 2008–09 (south), 2012–13 (south), 2015–16 (south), 2016–17 (south) (record)

==== Cups ====
- Bosnia and Herzegovina Cup:
  - Semi-finalists (1): 2021–22

== Current squad ==
As of 11 April 2026

Note: Flags indicate national team as defined under FIFA eligibility rules; some limited exceptions apply. Players may hold more than one non-FIFA nationality.

No.	Pos.	Nation	Player
1	GK	CRO	Josip Bender
2	MF	BIH	Damir Halilović
3	DF	BIH	Semir Brkić
4	MF	BIH	Malik Kolić
5	DF	BIH	Tarik Hero
6	MF	BRA	Edmar
7	FW	BIH	Anel Hebibović
8	MF	CRO	Nino Stojanovič
9	FW	BIH	Faris Zubanović
10	FW	BIH	Kerim Tatar
11	FW	BIH	Amin Alagić
12	GK	BIH	Danjel Stijepic
13	FW	BIH	Said Duranović
14	FW	BIH	Arman Džanković

No.	Pos.	Nation	Player
15	MF	BIH	Aner Alagic
16	DF	BIH	Harun Kozić
17	DF	BIH	Kenan Hebibovic (captain)
18	FW	BIH	Nedim Hadžić
19	DF	BIH	Adin Bajrić
20	DF	BIH	Azur Mahmić
21	DF	BIH	Eldar Mehić
22	DF	BIH	Kemal Osmanković
24	MF	BIH	Adis Hadžanović
25	MF	BIH	Mirza Dzumhur
77	FW	BIH	Sanjin Lelic
—	MF	BEL	Jack Senga (on loan from Sarajevo)
—	FW	BIH	Ali Serdarevic

== Club seasons ==
Season	League									Cup	Europe
Season	Division	P	W	D	L	F	A	Pts	Pos	Cup	Europe
1997–98	Second League of FBiH – South	22	12	5	5	38	17	41	2nd		
1998–99	Second League of FBiH – First 'B-League'	22	9	3	10	26	26	30	9th		
1999–2000	Second League of FBiH – First 'B-League'	15	6	2	7	25	26	20	9th	QF	
Current format of Premier League of Bosnia and Herzegovina
2000–01	First League of FBiH	32	7	6	19	38	62	27	16th ↓		
2003–04	Second League of FBiH – South	30	18	6	6	77	27	60	3rd		
2004–05	Second League of FBiH – South										
2005–06	Second League of FBiH – South								↑	R2	
2006–07	First League of FBiH	30	13	3	14	48	42	42	9th		
2007–08	First League of FBiH	30	11	8	11	38	41	41	13th ↓	R1	
2008–09	Second League of FBiH – South								↑		
2009–10	First League of FBiH	30	13	5	12	43	36	44	9th		
2010–11	First League of FBiH	30	9	4	17	34	57	31	15th ↓		
2011–12	Second League of FBiH – South										
2012–13	Second League of FBiH – South								↑		
2013–14	First League of FBiH	30	12	3	15	37	53	39	12th	R1	
2014–15	First League of FBiH	30	2	7	21	20	56	13	16th ↓	R1	
2015–16	Second League of FBiH – South										
2016–17	Second League of FBiH – South	28	23	2	3	79	24	71	1st ↑		
2017–18	First League of FBiH	30	10	6	14	31	35	36	13th		
2018–19	First League of FBiH	30	11	7	12	30	27	40	13th	R1	
2019–20	First League of FBiH	16	7	2	7	17	18	23	8th		
2020–21	First League of FBiH	30	10	7	13	38	35	37	13th	R1	
2021–22	First League of FBiH	30	20	8	2	47	16	68	1st ↑	SF	
2022–23	Premier League	33	9	10	14	42	48	37	8th	R1	
2023–24	Premier League	33	9	6	18	40	67	33	10th	R2	
2024–25	Premier League	33	8	5	20	30	66	29	10th ↓	R2	
2025–26	First League of FBiH	26	9	5	12	29	44	32	10th		

== Managerial history ==
- (Bosnia and Herzegovina) Fahrudin Zejnilović (1 July 2002 – 30 June 2003)
- (Bosnia and Herzegovina) Edin Prljača (1 July 2003 – 30 June 2004)
- (Bosnia and Herzegovina) Velibor Pudar (1 July 2009 – 30 June 2010)
- (Bosnia and Herzegovina) Adis Obad (2 July 2013 – 8 September 2014)
- (Bosnia and Herzegovina) Faik Kolar (26 December 2014 – 30 June 2015)
- (Bosnia and Herzegovina) Adis Obad (9 July 2017 – 5 April 2018)
- (Bosnia and Herzegovina) Nedim Jusufbegović (6 April 2018 – 10 May 2019)
- (Bosnia and Herzegovina) Emir Tufek (13 May 2019 – 30 June 2019)
- (Bosnia and Herzegovina) Fadil Hodžić (21 June 2019 – 22 September 2020)
- (Bosnia and Herzegovina) Milomir Šešlija (23 September 2020 – 6 April 2021)
- (Bosnia and Herzegovina) Adnan Elezović (6 April 2021 – 22 December 2022)
- (Bosnia and Herzegovina) Husref Musemić (22 December 2022 – 27 July 2023)
- (Bosnia and Herzegovina) Dženis Ćosić (3 August 2023 – 3 October 2023)
- (Bosnia and Herzegovina) Edis Mulalić (4 October 2023 – 27 April 2024)
- (Bosnia and Herzegovina) Adnan Elezović (interim) (27 April 2024 – 22 June 2024)
- (Bosnia and Herzegovina) Husref Musemić (22 June 2024 – 6 November 2024)
- (Sweden) Zvezdan Milošević (11 January 2025 – 2 April 2025)
- (Croatia) Alen Peternac (12 April 2025 – 30 June 2025)
- (Bosnia and Herzegovina) Dario Damjanović (22 August 2025 – 31 December 2025)
- (Bosnia and Herzegovina) Dženis Ćosić (4 February 2026 – 30 June 2026)
- (Bosnia and Herzegovina) Jadranko Bogičević (3 August 2026 – present)
