= Stadium Perica-Pero Pavlović =

Stadium in Gabela, Bosnia and Herzegovina

Stadion Perica-Pero Pavlović
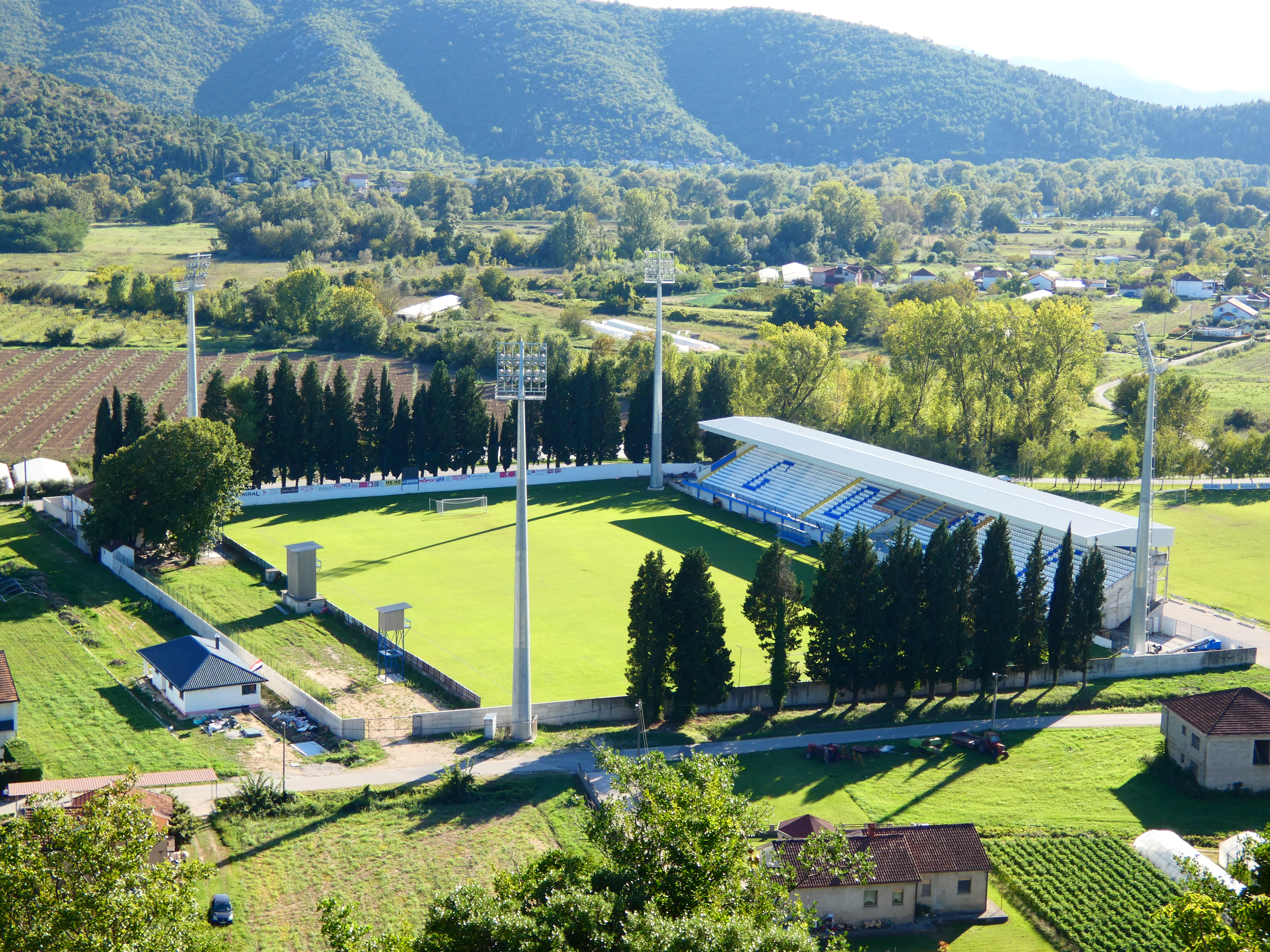
- Interactive map of Stadion Perica-Pero Pavlović
- Former names: Stadion Podavala (until 2016)
- Location: Gabela, Bosnia and Herzegovina
- Coordinates: 43°03′42″N 17°40′58″E
- Owner: NK GOŠK Gabela
- Capacity: 3,000
- Surface: Grass

Construction
- Opened: 1959
- Renovated: 2017

Tenants
- NK GOŠK Gabela; FK Velež Mostar (2022)

Stadium Perica-Pero Pavlović is a multi-use stadium in Gabela, Bosnia and Herzegovina. It is the home ground of Bosnian Premier League club NK GOŠK Gabela. The stadium has a capacity to hold 3,000 seated spectators.

In December 2016, the stadium was renamed from Stadium Podavala to Stadium Perica-Pero Pavlović.
