= Stadion Banja Ilidža (Gradačac) =

Stadium in Bosnia and Herzegovina

Coordinates: 44°53′13″N 18°24′46″E

Stadion "Banja Ilidža"
- Banja
- Interactive map of Stadion "Banja Ilidža"
- Full name: Stadion "Banja Ilidža"
- Location: Gradačac, Bosnia and Herzegovina
- Owner: NK Zvijezda Gradačac
- Operator: NK Zvijezda Gradačac
- Capacity: 5,000

Tenant
- NK Zvijezda Gradačac

Stadion Banja Ilidža is a football stadium in Gradačac, Bosnia and Herzegovina. It is the home stadium of First League of FBiH club NK Zvijezda Gradačac. The stadium holds 5,000 spectators.
