= HNK Tomislav =

- Full name: Hrvatski nogometni klub Tomislav
- Founded: 30 April 1920; 106 years ago
- Ground: Gradski stadion Tomislav
- Capacity: 2,000
- Chairman: Ilija Bagarić
- Manager: Bonislav Perković
- League: First League of FBiH
- 2025–26: First League of FBiH, 9th of 14
- Website: http://hnktomislav.com
Home colours	Away colours

HNK Tomislav (Croatian: Hrvatski nogometni klub Tomislav, lit. 'Croatian Football Club Tomislav') is a professional football club from Tomislavgrad, Bosnia and Herzegovina. The club competes in the First League of the Federation of Bosnia and Herzegovina.

The club was established in 1920 and named after the Croatian king Tomislav. In 1928, the club was renamed to Vran, after the nearby mountain. After World War II, in 1946, the new communist authorities renamed the club Zvijezda (English: star). In 1954, the club's name was again changed to Budućnost (English: future). During this period, the club gained its official ground in the town centre.

In 1990, with the democratisation process in Yugoslavia, the club returned to its original name Tomislav, while the grounds were renamed to Gradski stadion Tomislav (English: Town stadium Tomislav).

== History ==
=== Kingdom of Yugoslavia (1920–1941) ===
Tomislavgrad's football history starts in 1910, when August Batinić, a player of the NK SAŠK, brought a ball in Tomislavgrad, at the time named Županjac. The first football matches were played at Bara, where the present-day basilica is located.

The idea of establishing a football club appeared after World War I. However, the founding assembly was held only on 30 April 1920 in a pub owned by Ilija Zrno Čokrlja. Batinić initiated the idea. The first president of the football club's committee was Stojan Protrka. The committee named the football club HNK Tomislav in honour of the first Croatian king Tomislav, whose crowning, according to legend, took place near Županjac, and preparations were underway to mark the 1000th anniversary of the event. The first kit, a white shirt and black trousers, in which footballers played before World War I, was confirmed by the committee as the official kit.

The construction of a playground was among the committee's main goals; however, it wasn't realised. The club player on various improvised playgrounds. The club's first match was played in Županjac on 29 September 1920 against students from Županjac who studied at the Široki Brijeg gymnasium. Tomislav won the match. The first official match was played against Stožer, won by Tomislav 2–1.

In 1928, Županjac changed its name to Tomislavgrad, officially in honour of Prince Tomislav, son of King Alexander I of Yugoslavia, but unofficially in honour of King Tomislav of Croatia. Due to the official state policy of Kingdom of Yugoslavia, which suppressed Croatian nationalism, in 1927, the club was renamed to Vran (after the Vran mountain), a name that was used until 1946, so it could continue to play against other football clubs.

=== Communist Yugoslavia (1945–1992) ===
During World War II, Tomislavgrad was part of the German puppet state Independent State of Croatia, which was divided into two demarcation zones, one occupied by the Germans and the other by the Italians. Tomislavgrad was in the Italian zone. During the war, Vran played matches against the Italian regiments.

After World War II, the communists took power. In accordance with the socialist ideology, Vran changed its name to Zvijezda (Star). This was the club's name from 1946 to 1954. The official kit was a red shirt and blue trousers and socks. Zvijezda didn't participate in the official contests, but it did play against neighbouring football clubs. In 1952, Zvijezda played in the Football Sub-Federal League Mostar.

Zvijezda again changed its name on 23 August 1954 to Fudbalski klub Budućnost (Football Club Future). The club used this name until 1990. The Budućnost's colours were red and white. Budućnost continued to play in the Football Sub-Federal League Mostar. The League had 10 clubs. The official Budućnost playground was now near the town centre.

In 1958, the Football Sub-Federal League Mostar was divided into two groups – North and South, each had 6 clubs. Budućnost was in the group North. The group North had six clubs. Budućnost ended up fourth.

On the initiative of the sportsmen from Livno, the Football Sub-Federation of Livno was formed. The Football Sub-Federation Livno existed from 1959 to 1963. It had 6 clubs. In order to maintain the Sub-Federation Livno, new clubs were formed. Budućnost competed in the Sub-Federation Livno until 1962.

As a factory was being constructed at Budućnost's playground, Budućnost played on an improvised playground at Glibine in Ćavarov Stan. In May 1960, the Sub-Federation Livno suspended Budućnost, and the suspension was lifted in December 1960. Budućnost was suspended because the Sub-Federation Livno intended to make Troglav the champion, and Budućnost held first place. Nonetheless, Budućnost ended up first and entered the Herzegovina Zone, part of the Third Yugoslav League. Budućnost ended up 11th out of 12 clubs and continued to compete in the Herzegovina Zone.

In 1963, Budućnost opened a new stadium, Ferovac, which serves as the official stadium for HNK Tomislav today. The stadium had stands and locker rooms. On average, Budućnost was at the centre of the rankings or was competing to remain in the Third League. As of season 1971–72 to 1974–75, Budućnost was among the top clubs of the Third League.

In 1978, the Herzegovina Zone was divided into two groups. The division was made because many new clubs were founded in Herzegovina. Budućnost was in the group amongst ten other clubs. Budućnost won third place.

In 1979, the new Republican Regional League–South was formed, and Budućnost entered it and played in it through the 1979–80 season.

In the 1981–82 season, Budućnost was back in the Herzegovina Zone – South. In 1984, it was decided to unite the North and South groups into a single league with 18 clubs, among which was Budućnost, which finished 13th.

=== Croatian Republic of Herzeg-Bosnia (1992–2001) ===
In 1989, Fudbalski klub Budućnost changed its name to Nogometni klub Budućnost, using the Croatian term for football instead of the official Serbo-Croatian. On 30 May 1990, Budućnost took its original name HNK Tomislav. The official stadium was named Gradski stadion "Tomislav" (City Stadium "Tomislav").

In the 1990–91 season, Tomislav played in the Herzegovina Zone – South, where it took first place and entered the Republican Regional League – South. In 1991, Tomislav was successful in the Coup of Yugoslavia, entering the round of 16 where it was defeated by RAD from Belgrade with a result of 0–4.

Tomislav played three matches in the Republican Regional League – South and, for political reasons, refused to continue competing after that, namely to protest the war in Croatia. After Tomislav left the League, other Croatian clubs did so as well.

During the Bosnian War, all players of the Tomislav participated either as soldiers or in working units. Tomislav continued to exist despite the war. In August 1992 it played a tournament against the units of the Croatian Defence Council (HVO). Tomislav also played against a UNPROFOR team and won 11–0. Other friendly games against other football clubs were played as well.

From 1993 to 2000, Tomislav competed in the First League of Herzeg-Bosnia. The First League of Herzeg-Bosnia was the first league formed during the war and the only league in existence after the war. Football Federation of Herzeg-Bosnia as well as the Herzeg-Bosnia national football team also existed. The Serb and Bosniak football clubs play in their own respective leagues. Each national league had its own football federation and national team.

In the 1993–94 season, Tomislav was a runner-up, while Široki Brijeg won the championship of the Herzegovina group of the First League. Both clubs had the same number of points and the same goal difference, but Široki Brijeg had a better record in matches between the two clubs. Thus, Široki Brijeg gained the right to play off with the champions from the Posavina and Central Bosnia groups, eventually defeating them and becoming the champion of Herzeg-Bosnia.

In the 1994–95 season, Tomislav finished 4th. In the 1995–96 season, 80% of players were recruited, yet Tomislav performed well. In the 1996–97 season, Tomislav was demoted to the Second League of Herzeg-Bosnia. From 1997 to 2001, Tomislav competed in the Second League of Herzeg-Bosnia – Centre 2.

=== Federation of Bosnia and Herzegovina (2001–present) ===
The First League of the Federation of Bosnia and Herzegovina is one of the second-tier football leagues in Bosnia and Herzegovina, comprising football clubs from the Federation of Bosnia and Herzegovina, one of the two political entities of Bosnia and Herzegovina. The second league is the First League of the Republika Srpska, the football league that gathers clubs from Republika Srpska, the other political entity. Both leagues were formed in 2000. On the same principle, the third leagues were also formed, namely the Second League of the Federation of Bosnia and Herzegovina and the Second League of the Republika Srpska. These leagues are further divided into several groups. The Second League of the Federation of Bosnia and Herzegovina was divided into the groups North, Centre, South, and West, with HNK Tomislav competing in the group Centre.

In the 2000–01 season, HNK Tomislav won the championship in the Centre group, followed by the Drinovci football club from Drinovci. Tomislav played the qualifying game from the North group champion Mladost from Domaljevac and won with an aggregate score of 7–1, thus qualifying for the First League of the Federation of Bosnia and Herzegovina.

In the 2001–02 season of the First League of the Federation of Bosnia and Herzegovina, Tomislav ended up 8th. The next season, Tomislav ended up 14th, and was again demoted to the Second League of the Federation of Bosnia and Herzegovina Centre, where it competes today.
