= Kosova (Maglaj) =

Village in Maglaj, Bosnia and Herzegovina

- Village
- Location within Bosnia and Herzegovina
- Country: Bosnia and Herzegovina
- Entity: Federation of Bosnia and Herzegovina
- Canton: Zenica-Doboj
- Municipality: Maglaj

Area
  - Total: 3.71 sq mi (9.60 km^{2})

Population (2013)
  - Total: 1,809
  - Density: 488/sq mi (188/km^{2})
- Time zone: UTC+1 (CET)
  - Summer (DST): UTC+2 (CEST)

Kosova is a village in the municipality of Maglaj, Bosnia and Herzegovina.

== Demographics ==
According to the 2013 census, its population was 1,809.

Ethnicity in 2013
Ethnicity	Number	Percentage
Bosniaks	1,795	99.2%
Croats	1	0.1%
other/undeclared	13	0.7%
Total	1,809	100%
