= HNK Čapljina =

- Full name: Hrvatski nogometni klub Čapljina
- Founded: 1993
- Ground: Bjelave
- Capacity: 1,000
- Chairman: Slađan Milinković
- Manager: Marko Bencun
- League: First League of FBiH
- 2025–26: Second League of FBiH (South), 1st of 15 (promoted)
Home colours	Away colours

HNK Čapljina (Croatian: Hrvatski nogometni klub Čapljina, lit. Croatian Football Club Čapljina) is a professional association football club from the city of Čapljina that is situated in Bosnia and Herzegovina.

Čapljina currently plays in the First League of the Federation of Bosnia and Herzegovina and plays its home matches on the Bjelave Stadium which has a capacity of 1,000 seats.

== Honours ==
=== Domestic ===
==== League ====
- First League of the Federation of Bosnia and Herzegovina:
  - Runners-up (1): 2010–11
- Second League of the Federation of Bosnia and Herzegovina:
  - Winners (3): 2007–08 (south), 2009–10 (south), 2025–26 (south)

== Managerial history ==
- (Croatia) Tomislav Raguž (3 September 2012 – 28 May 2013)
- (Bosnia and Herzegovina) Zlatko Krizanović (28 May 2013 – 30 June 2013)
- (Bosnia and Herzegovina) Damir Borovac (30 June 2013 – 31 July 2014)
- (Croatia) Dario Zadro (31 July 2014 – 10 September 2014)
- (Bosnia and Herzegovina) Zlatko Krizanović (10 September 2014 – 15 November 2014)
- (Bosnia and Herzegovina) Damir Borovac (24 May 2015 – 9 October 2016)
- (Croatia) Tomislav Raguž (10 October 2016 – 7 March 2017)
- (Bosnia and Herzegovina) Damir Beća (9 March 2017 – 27 August 2017)
- (Bosnia and Herzegovina) Damir Borovac (29 August 2017 – 16 April 2019)
- (Croatia) Tomislav Raguž (17 April 2019 – 10 June 2019)
- (Bosnia and Herzegovina) Dragan Radović (2 July 2019 – 27 October 2020)
- (Bosnia and Herzegovina) Damir Borovac (5 November 2020 – 30 June 2023)
- (Croatia) Marko Bencun (15 July 2024 – present)
