= Stadion pod Borićima =

Stadium in Bosnia and Herzegovina

Stadion Pod Borićima
- Stadion Jedinstvo Bihać
- Interactive map of Stadion Pod Borićima
- Full name: Stadion pod Borićima
- Address: Žegarska aleja bb, Bihać, Bosnia and Herzegovina
- Location: Bihać, Bosnia and Herzegovina
- Coordinates: 44°48′24″N 15°51′50″E
- Owner: City of Bihać
- Operator: NK Jedinstvo Bihać
- Capacity: 7,504
- Surface: Grass

Construction
- Built: 1969
- Renovated: 1999, 2019

Tenant
- NK Jedinstvo Bihać

Website
- https://nkj.ba/

Stadion Pod Borićima is a multi-purpose stadium in Bihać, Bosnia and Herzegovina. It is currently used mostly for football matches and is the home ground of NK Jedinstvo Bihać. The stadium can hold about 7,504 spectators, including 5,504 seats.
