= First League of the Federation of Bosnia and Herzegovina =

Second tier association football league, Bosnia and Herzegovina

WWin First League of the Federation of Bosnia and Herzegovina
- Founded: 2000
- First season: 2000–01
- Country: Bosnia and Herzegovina
- Confederation: UEFA
- Number of clubs: 16
- Level on pyramid: 2
- Promotion to: Premier League
- Relegation to: Second League of FBiH
- Domestic cup(s): Bosnian Cup, Federation of Bosnia and Herzegovina Cup
- Current champions: Čelik Zenica (1st title) (2025–26)
- Most championships: GOŠK Gabela (3 titles)
- Broadcaster(s): MY TV
- Website: NSFBiH (Bosnian)
- Current: 2026–27 First League

The First League of the Federation of Bosnia and Herzegovina (Bosnian: Prva liga Federacije Bosne i Hercegovine; Croatian: Prva liga Federacije Bosne i Hercegovine; Serbian: Прва лига Федерације Босне и Херцеговине), officially known as the WWin First League of the Federation of Bosnia and Herzegovina for sponsorship purposes, is a football league in Bosnia and Herzegovina. Together with the First League of the Republika Srpska, it forms the second level of football in Bosnia and Herzegovina.

The league consists of 16 teams. Each team plays a total of 30 games during the course of a regular season, twice each team (once at home and once away). The league champion is promoted to the Premier League of Bosnia and Herzegovina. Relegated teams fall to the Second League of the Federation of Bosnia and Herzegovina. The number of relegated clubs depends on how many teams will enter the competition the following seasons which is decided seasonally by the Football Association. Depending on the outcome, two to three teams can be relegated.

== Sponsorship ==
On 13 August 2020, the Football Association of the Federation of Bosnia and Herzegovina signed a three-year deal with Mtel regarding the sponsorship of the league, effectively renaming the league m:tel First League. On 12 September 2024, the Football Association of the Federation of Bosnia and Herzegovina signed a three-year deal with WWin regarding the sponsorship of the league, effectively renaming the league WWin First League.

== Member clubs for 2026–27 ==
Team	Location	Stadium	Capacity
Bratstvo	Gračanica	Stadion Luke	5,200
Budućnost	Banovići	Stadion FK Budućnost	8,500
Čapljina	Čapljina	Bjelave Stadium	1,000
GOŠK	Gabela	Perica-Pero Pavlović	3,000
Igman	Konjic	Konjic City Stadium	5,000
Jedinstvo	Bihać	Pod Borićima Stadium	7,500
Posušje	Posušje	Mokri Dolac Stadium	5,040
Radnik	Hadžići	Hadžići City Stadium	500
Rudar	Kakanj	Stadion Rudara	5,000
Sloboda	Tuzla	Tušanj	7,200
Stupčanica	Olovo	Danac Stadium	1,500
Tomislav	Tomislavgrad	Gradski Stadion Tomislav	2,000
TOŠK	Tešanj	Stadion Luke	7,000
Travnik	Travnik	Stadion Pirota	3,076
Vitez	Vitez	Vitez City Stadium	3,500
Zvijezda	Gradačac	Stadion Banja Ilidža	5,000

== League champions ==
Season	Champion
2000–01	Grude
2001–02	Žepče
2002–03	Travnik
2003–04	Budućnost Banovići
2004–05	Jedinstvo Bihać
2005–06	Velež Mostar
2006–07	Travnik
2007–08	Zvijezda Gradačac
2008–09	Olimpik
2009–10	Budućnost Banovići
2010–11	GOŠK Gabela
2011–12	Gradina
2012–13	Vitez
2013–14	Sloboda Tuzla
2014–15	Mladost Doboj Kakanj
2015–16	Metalleghe-BSI
2016–17	GOŠK Gabela
2017–18	Sloga Simin Han
2018–19	Velež Mostar
2019–20	Olimpik
2020–21	Posušje
2021–22	Igman Konjic
2022–23	GOŠK Gabela
2023–24	Sloboda Tuzla
2024–25	Stupčanica Olovo
2025–26	Čelik Zenica
