= NK Zvijezda Gradačac =

Zvijezda
- Full name: Nogometni klub Zvijezda
- Nickname: Zmajevi (The Dragons)
- Founded: 1922; 104 years ago (as NK Vardar)
- Ground: Banja Ilidža
- Capacity: 5,000
- Chairman: Ferhat Peštalić
- Manager: Almir Hukić
- League: First League of FBiH
- 2025–26: Second League of FBiH (North), 1st of 16 (promoted)
Home colours	Away colours

Nogometni klub Zvijezda Gradačac (English: Football Club Zvijezda Gradačac), or commonly referred to as just Zvijezda is a football club from Bosnia and Herzegovina, based in the city of Gradačac. Zvijezda host their home matches at the Banja Ilidža Stadium, which has a capacity of 5,000 seats. They currently play in the First League of the Federation of Bosnia and Herzegovina, the country's second level.

== History ==
The club was founded in 1922 as NK Vardar. After World War II the club was renamed Zvijezda. Until 1992 and the breakup of Yugoslavia, Zvijezda competed in various lower-tier zonal and regional leagues of the Yugoslav league system.

== Honours ==
=== Domestic ===
==== League ====
- First League of the Federation of Bosnia and Herzegovina:
  - Winners (1): 2007–08
  - Runners-up (1): 2015–16
- Second League of the Federation of Bosnia and Herzegovina:
  - Winners (2): 2005–06 (north), 2025–26 (north)

== Managerial history ==
- (Bosnia and Herzegovina) Ratko Ninković (2007–2009)
- (Bosnia and Herzegovina) Amir Durgutović (2009)
- (Bosnia and Herzegovina) Zoran Ćurguz (2009–2010)
- (Bosnia and Herzegovina) Dragan Jović (2010–2012)
- (Serbia) Zoran Kuntić (2012)
- (Bosnia and Herzegovina) Milomir Odović (2012–2013)
- (Bosnia and Herzegovina) Vladimir Gaćinović (2013)
- (Bosnia and Herzegovina) Nermin Huseinbašić (2013)
- (Bosnia and Herzegovina) Denis Taletović (2013–2014)
- (Bosnia and Herzegovina) Emir Tufek (2014)
- (Bosnia and Herzegovina) Nermin Huseinbašić (2014)
- (Croatia) Petar Šegrt (2014–2015)
- (Bosnia and Herzegovina) Nedim Jusufbegović (2015–2016)
- (Bosnia and Herzegovina) Darko Vojvodić (2016–2017)
- (Bosnia and Herzegovina) Bojan Magazin (2017)
- (Bosnia and Herzegovina) Nermin Šabić (2017–2018)
- (Bosnia and Herzegovina) Romeo Šapina (2018)
- (Bosnia and Herzegovina) Mile Lazarević (2018–2019)
- (Bosnia and Herzegovina) Senad Hadžić (2019)
- (Bosnia and Herzegovina) Vlado Jagodić (2019)
- (Bosnia and Herzegovina) Mile Lazarević (2019–2020)
- (Bosnia and Herzegovina) Dario Damjanović (2020)
- (Croatia) Mato Neretljak (2020–2021)
- (Bosnia and Herzegovina) Nebojša Đekanović (2021–2023)
- (Bosnia and Herzegovina) Nihad Kadić (2023)
- (Croatia) Mato Neretljak (2023–2024)
- (Bosnia and Herzegovina) Milorad Ilišković (2024)
- (Croatia) Mato Neretljak (2025–2026)
- (Bosnia and Herzegovina) Almir Hukić (2026–present)
