= FK Rudar Kakanj =

Bosnian association football club

Rudar Kakanj
- Full name: Fudbalski klub Rudar Kakanj
- Founded: 3 May 1920; 106 years ago
- Ground: Stadion Rudara, Kakanj
- Capacity: 5,000
- Manager: Mirnes Buza
- League: First League of FBiH
- 2025–26: Second League of FBiH (Center), 1st of 16 (promoted)
Home colours	Away colours

Fudbalski klub Rudar Kakanj is a professional association football club based in the city of Kakanj, Bosnia and Herzegovina. Founded on 3 May 1920, the club is currently competing in the First League of the Federation of Bosnia and Herzegovina. The club plays its home matches on the Stadion Rudara, which can accommodate 5,000 spectators.

== Honours ==
=== Domestic ===
==== League ====
- First League of the Federation of Bosnia and Herzegovina:
  - Runners-up (3): 2005–06, 2006–07, 2008–09
- Second League of the Federation of Bosnia and Herzegovina:
  - Winners (2): 2024–25 (center), 2025–26 (center)
