= Second League of the Federation of Bosnia and Herzegovina =

Third tier association football league, Bosnia and Herzegovina

- Founded: 1995
- Country: Bosnia and Herzegovina
- Confederation: UEFA
- Number of clubs: 57
- Level on pyramid: 3
- Promotion to: First League of FBiH
- Relegation to: Cantonal Leagues
- Domestic cup(s): Bosnian Cup; Federation of Bosnia and Herzegovina Cup
- Current champions: Zvijezda Gradačac (North); Rudar Kakanj (Center); Čapljina (South); Rudar Kamengrad (West) (2025–26)
- Most championships: Igman Konjic (5 titles)

The Second League of the Federation of Bosnia and Herzegovina (Bosnian: Druga liga Federacije Bosne i Hercegovine; Croatian: Druga liga Federacije Bosne i Hercegovine; Serbian: Друга лига Федерације Босне и Херцеговине) is a football league in Bosnia and Herzegovina. This level is organized into four different leagues: Sjever (North), Centar (Center), Jug (South) and Zapad (West). (Until the 2011–12 season there was two West leagues.)

This is the second level of football in the Federation of Bosnia and Herzegovina and the third level of football in the country. Two teams are promoted to the First League of FBiH at the end of the season, while bottom teams (depending on league and number of lower leagues) are relegated to the cantonal leagues. (See Bosnia and Herzegovina football league system.)

== Winners ==
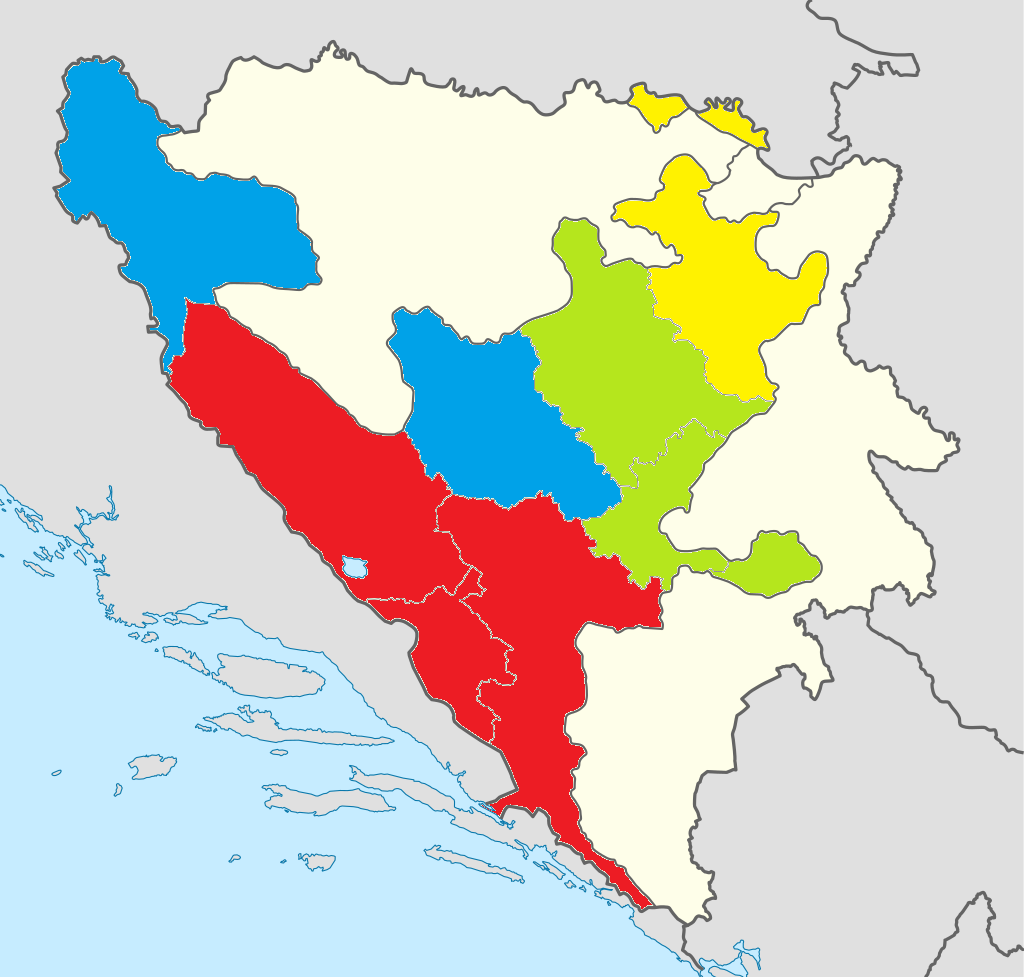
Groups of the Second League of FBiH

Season	North	Center	South	West
2002–03	—N/a	Sloga Tolisa	GOŠK Gabela	—N/a
2003–04	Mramor	Sloga, Vitez, Čapljina	—N/a	—N/a
2004–05	Gradina	Olimpik	Troglav Livno	Kreševo
2005–06	Zvijezda Gradačac	TOŠK Tešanj	Igman Konjic	Krajina Cazin
2006–07	Bratstvo Gračanica	Ozren	Drinovci	Iskra Bugojno
2007–08	Omladinac Mionica	Olimpik	Čapljina	Krajina Cazin
2008–09	Slaven Živinice	Goražde	Igman Konjic	Krajišnik
2009–10	Gradina	Radnik Hadžići	Čapljina	Krajina Cazin
2010–11	Bratstvo Gračanica	UNIS Vogošća	Branitelj Mostar	Vitez
2011–12	Radnički Lukavac	Bosna Visoko	Troglav Livno	Podgrmeč
2012–13	Orašje	Mladost Doboj Kakanj	Igman Konjic	Una Kulen Vakuf
2013–14	Mladost Malešići	Goražde	Turbina Jablanica	Maestral-BSI
2014–15	Sloga Simin Han	Bosna Visoko	Sloga Ljubuški	Novi Travnik
2015–16	Sloga Simin Han	Bosna Sema	Igman Konjic	Krajina Cazin
2016–17	Slaven Živinice	TOŠK Tešanj	Igman Konjic	Iskra Bugojno
2017–18	Budućnost Banovići	Goražde	Posušje	Novi Travnik
2018–19	Budućnost Banovići	Radnik Hadžići	Klis Buturović Polje	Travnik
2019–20	Seona	Vis Simm-Bau	Posušje	Rudar Han Bila
2020–21	Gradina	Borac Jelah	Ljubuški	Podgrmeč
2021–22	Radnički Lukavac	Stupčanica	Klis Buturović Polje	Iskra Bugojno
2022–23	Seona	Čelik Zenica	Klis Buturović Polje	Bratstvo Bosanska Krupa
2023–24	Dinamo Donja Mahala	Famos	Kruševo	Travnik
2024–25	Napredak Matići	Rudar Kakanj	Kruševo	Vitez
2025–26	Zvijezda Gradačac	Rudar Kakanj	Čapljina	Rudar Kamengrad
