= List of football clubs in Bosnia and Herzegovina =

This is a list of association football clubs located in Bosnia and Herzegovina, sorted by league and division within the Bosnia and Herzegovina football league system, as of the 2012–13 season. There are 610 football clubs in Bosnia and Herzegovina (306 in Federation of Bosnia and Herzegovina and 304 in Republika Srpska), including clubs who are in resting mode.

== First level ==
Locations of the 2025–26 Premier League of BiH clubs

There are total of 10 clubs in the top tier of Bosnia and Herzegovina football.

Team	Location
Borac	Banja Luka
Posušje	Posušje
Radnik	Bijeljina
Rudar	Prijedor
Sarajevo	Sarajevo (Koševo)
Sloga	Doboj
Široki Brijeg	Široki Brijeg
Velež	Mostar (Vrapčići)
Zrinjski	Mostar
Željezničar	Sarajevo (Grbavica)

== Second level ==
There are a total of 32 clubs in two leagues when it comes to the second tier of Bosnia and Herzegovina football.

=== Federation of Bosnia and Herzegovina ===
Team	Location
Bratstvo	Gračanica
Budućnost	Banovići
Čelik	Zenica
GOŠK	Gabela
Igman	Konjic
Jedinstvo	Bihać
Radnik	Hadžići
Sloboda	Tuzla
Stupčanica	Olovo
Tomislav	Tomislavgrad
TOŠK	Tešanj
Travnik	Travnik
Tuzla City	Tuzla
Vitez	Vitez

=== Republika Srpska ===
- Borac Kozarska Dubica
- BSK Banja Luka
- Drina HE Višegrad
- Drina Zvornik
- Famos Vojkovići
- Kozara Gradiška
- Laktaši
- Leotar
- Ljubić Prnjavor
- Romanija Pale
- Rudar Prijedor
- Slavija Sarajevo
- Sloboda Mrkonjić Grad
- Sloboda Novi Grad
- Sutjeska Foča
- Velež Nevesinje
- Željezničar Banja Luka
- Zvijezda 09

== Third level ==
There are a total of 90 clubs in six leagues when it comes to the third tier of Bosnia and Herzegovina football.

=== Federation of Bosnia and Herzegovina ===
The Second league of the Federation of Bosnia and Herzegovina is divided in four regional leagues: North, Center, South and West.

=== North (Sjever) ===
- Bosna Kalesija
- Bosna Mionica
- Dinamo Donja Mahala
- Dizdaruša
- Gornji Rahić
- Gradina
- Lokomotiva Miričina
- Mladost Malešići
- Mramor
- Odžak 102
- Orahovica 74
- Priluk
- Prokosovići
- Radnički Lukavac
- Seona
- Svatovac

=== Center (Centar) ===
- Azot
- Borac Jelah
- Bosna Visoko
- Famos Hrasnica
- Ilijaš
- Kolina
- Krivaja
- Mošćanica
- Moševac
- Natron
- Pobjeda Tešanjka
- Rudar Breza
- SAŠK Napredak
- Stupčanica
- Unis
- Usora

=== South (Jug) ===
- Bjelopoljac
- Brotnjo
- Grude
- Kamešnica
- Klis
- Ljubuški
- Neum
- Rama
- Sloga Gornji Vakuf-Uskoplje
- Stolac
- Tomislav
- Troglav 1918
- Turbina

=== West (Zapad) ===
- Brekovica 78 (II)
- Busovača (I)
- Iskra (I)
- Kiseljak (I)
- Krajina Cazin (II)
- Krajišnik (II)
- NK Novi Travnik (I)
- Podgrmeč (II)
- Radnik Donji Vakuf (I)
- Rudar Han Bila (I)
- Rudar Kamengrad (II)
- Sloga Bosanska Otoka (II)
- FK Vitez (I)
- NK Vitez (I)
- Vitez Bužim (II)
- Vlašić (I)

=== Republika Srpska ===
The Second league of the Republika Srpska is divided in two regional leagues: West and East.

=== East (Istok) ===
- FK Budućnost Pilica
- FK Glasinac 2011
- FK Guber Srebrenica
- FK Hercegovac Bileća
- FK Ilićka 01 Brčko
- FK Jedinstvo Brodac
- FK Jedinstvo Roćević
- FK Mladost Gacko
- FK Mladost Rogatica
- FK Napredak Donji Šepak
- FK Podrinje Janja
- FK Proleter Dvorovi
- FK Rudar 1925
- FK Stakorina Čajniče
- FK Vlasenica
- FK Zadrugar Donje Crnjelovo

=== West (Zapad) ===
- FK Borac Šamac
- OFK Brdo Hambarine
- FK Čelinac
- FK Crni Vrh Jaružani
- FK Dubrave
- FK FSA Prijedor
- FK Gorica Šipovo
- OFK Lauš Banja Luka
- FK Modriča
- FK Naprijed Banja Luka
- FK Omarska
- FK Polet 1926
- FK Proleter Teslić
- FK Sloga Srbac
- FK Sloga Trn
- FK Tekstilac Derventa
- FK Željezničar Doboj

== Fourth level ==
There are a total of 147 clubs in 14 leagues when it comes to the fourth tier of Bosnia and Herzegovina football.

=== Federation of Bosnia and Herzegovina ===
The Cantonal leagues of the Federation of Bosnia and Herzegovina are divided in ten leagues: League of Una-Sana Canton, First League of Central Bosnia Canton, Inter-cantonal league of HBŽ/ZHŽ, League of Herzegovina-Neretva Canton, League of Sarajevo Canton - Group A, League of Sarajevo Canton - Group B, League of Bosnian Podrinje Canton, League of Zenica-Doboj Canton, First League of Tuzla Canton and First League of Posavina Canton.

==== First League of Tuzla Canton ====
Club	City / Town
Gornji Rainci	Gornji Rainci
Tuzla	Tuzla
Rudar	Bukinje
Kiseljak	Kiseljak
DSK	Devetak
Svatovac	Poljice
Mladost (G)	Gnojnica
Sloga	Bikodže
Mladost (T)	Tinja
Orahovica 74	Gornja Orahovica
Doboj-Istok	Klokotnica
Mladost (VB)	Velika Brijesnica
Jedinstvo	Vučkovci
Sloboda	Kerep
Vražići 92	Vražići
Gornji Rahić	Gornji Rahić

==== First League of Posavina Canton ====
Club	City / Town
Odžak 102	Odžak
Sloga (P)	Prud
Mladost (D)	Domaljevac
Hajduk	Orašje
Sloga (T)	Tolisa
Bok	Bok
Kostrč	Kostrč
Mladost (V)	Vidovice
Napredak	Matići
19. Srpanj	Oštra Luka
Tramošnica	Tramošnica
Mladost (S)	Sibovac
Posavina 108	Bosanska Bijela
Dinamo 75	Prijedor

==== League of Sarajevo Canton - Group A ====
Club	City / Town
Pofalićki	Pofalići, Sarajevo
Dobrinja	Dobrinja, Sarajevo
Iskra	Logavina, Sarajevo
Omladinac	Stup, Ilidža
Butmir	Butmir, Ilidža
Bosna	Marijin Dvor, Sarajevo
Ozren	Semizovac, Vogošća
Jedinstvo	Ljubinići, Ilijaš

==== League of Sarajevo Canton - Group B ====
Club	City / Town
Igman	Ilidža
SAŠK Napredak	Trg Oslobođenja, Sarajevo
Stup	Stup, Ilidža
Jug	Bjelave, Sarajevo
Saobračajac	Otoka, Sarajevo
Hrid	Baščaršija, Sarajevo
Vrbanjuša	Baščaršija, Sarajevo
Bojnik	Bojnik, Sarajevo
Mošćanica	Mošćanica, Sarajevo

==== League of Una-Sana Canton ====
Club	City / Town
Mutnica	Pjanići
Gomila	Stijena
Željezničar	Bosanska Krupa
Brekovica 78	Brekovica
Bakšaiš	Bakšaiš
Borac	Izačić
Kamenica	Kamenica
Sloga 1937	Kralje
Mladost 38	Bosanski Petrovac
Omladinac	Sanica
Rudar	Kamengrad
Bajer 99	Velagići

==== League of Zenica-Doboj Canton ====
Club	City / Town
Rudar	Zenica
OFK Zenica	Zenica
Borac	Tetovo
Nemila	Nemila
Novi Šeher	Novi Šeher
Vis	Kosova
Gradina	Mravići
Pobjeda	Tešanjka
Napredak	Šije
Proleter	Makljenovac

==== First League of Central Bosnia Canton ====
Club	City / Town
Jajce	Jajce
Radnik	Donji Vakuf
Mladost	Nević Polje
Rijeka	Vitez
Šantići	Šantići
Jardol PC 96	Jardol
Busovača	Busovača
Fojnica	Fojnica
Stanić Kreševo	Kreševo

==== League of Bosnian Podrinje Canton ====
Club	City / Town
Azot	Vitkovići
BKB	Berič
Drina	Goražde
Gradac	Vranići
Gazije	Goražde
Ilovača	Goražde
Radnički	Goražde
Jahorina	Prača

==== League of Herzegovina-Neretva Canton ====
Club	City / Town
Buna	Buna
Cim	Cim
Bjelopoljac	Bijelo Polje
Jasenica	Jasenica
Kruševo	Kruševo
Međugorje	Međugorje
Lipanjske Zore	Domanovići
Iskra	Stolac

==== Inter-cantonal League of HBŽ/ZHŽ ====
Club	City / Town
Šator	Glamoč
Junak	Srđevići
Bužan	Prisoje
Šujica	Šuica
Vir	Vir
Drinovci	Drinovci

=== Republika Srpska ===
The Regional leagues of the Republika Srpska are divided in four leagues: West, Center, East and South.

==== Regional League - West ====
Club	City / Town
Ravan	Međeđa
Borac	Kozarska Dubica
Omarska	Omarska
Radnik Urije	Prijedor
Brdo	Hambarine
Dubrave	Dubrave
Omladinac	Brestovčina
Obradovac	Obradovac
Sloga	Trn
Potkozarje	Aleksandrovac
Budućnost	Šargovac
Lauš	Banja Luka
Krupa	Krupa na Vrbasu
Progres	Kneževo

==== Regional League - Center ====
Club	City / Town
Naša Krila	Kostajnica
Pridjel	Donji Pridjel
Rudanka	Rudanka
Željezničar	Doboj
Trebava	Osječani
Lijšće	Liješće
Vranjak	Vranjak
Skugrić	Skugrić
Posavina	Miloševac
Hajduk	Batkuša
Mladost	Tišina
Crvena Zvijezda (G)	Gajevi
Crvena Zvijezda (O)	Obudovac
Polet	Čović Polje

==== Regional League - East ====
Club	City / Town
Majevica	Lopare
Partizan	Donja Trnova
Ledinci	Batković
Drina	Amajlije
Sloga	Bijeljina
Zadrugar	Donje Crnjelovo
Jedinstvo	Roćević
Podrinje	Tršić
Trnovica	Trnovica
Radnički	Karakaj
Šekovići	Šekovići
Birač	Derventa
Bratstvo	Bratunac
Guber	Srebrenica

==== Regional League - South ====
Club	City / Town
Romanija	Pale
Rudo	Rudo
Željeznica	Trnovo
Velež	Nevesinje
Hercegovac	Bileća

== Fifth tier ==
There are a total of 156 clubs in 13 leagues when it comes to the fifth tier of Bosnia and Herzegovina football.

=== Federation of Bosnia and Herzegovina ===
The fifth tier of football in Federation of Bosnia and Herzegovina is mostly the second tier of the cantonal leagues with one municipality league divided in two groups. The leagues are: Second League of Tuzla Canton divided into South, North and West (all to First League of Tuzla Canton), Second League of Posavina Canton (to First League of Posavina Canton), Second League of Central Bosnia Canton (to First League of Central Bosnia Canton) and the Municipality League of Visoko divided into Group A and B (both to League of Zenica-Doboj Canton).

==== Second League of Tuzla Canton - South ====
Club	City / Town
Vrana	Banović Selo
Srnica	Treštenica
Gornje Dubrave	Gornje Dubrave
Jedinstvo	Donje Dubrave
Napredak	Tupkovići
Omladinac	Đurđevik
Rijeka	Šerići
Slatina	Bašigovci
Mladost 78	Donje Vukovije
Mladost (K)	Kikači
Husinski Rudar	Husino
Mladost (GT)	Gornja Tuzla
Sloga	Simin Han
Proleter	Slavinovići

==== Second League of Tuzla Canton - North ====
Club	City / Town
Međiđa	Donja Međiđa
Vida	Gradačac
12. decembar	Rajska
Trebava	Zelinja Donja
Željezničar	Jelovče Selo
Čelić	Čelić
Koraj	Koraj
Izbor	Brčko
Graničar	Brezovo Polje
1978 Brčko	Brčko
Posavina	Brod
Trešnjevka	Maoča
Voćar	Šatorovići
Polet	Palanka

==== Second League of Tuzla Canton - West ====
Club	City / Town
Željezničar	Dobošnica
Jedinstvo (H)	Huskići
Mramor	Gornje Babice
Orahovica 77	Orahovica
Ratiš	Kruševica
Rudar	Lukavac
Turija	Turija
Bukovik	Gornji Srebrenik
Seona	Seona
Sladna	Sladna
Stjepan Polje	Stjepan Polje
Lokomotiva	Miričina
Mladost	Doborovci
Jedinstvo (L)	Lukavica

==== Second League of Posavina Canton ====
Club	City / Town
Dragovoljac	Novo Selo
Posavina	Posavska Mahala
Korpar	Grebnice
9. Lipanj	Bazik
Radnik	Hrvatska Tišina
Posavac	Ugljara
Frankopan	Hrvatska Špionica
Ravne	Zovik
Vitanovići 78	Vitanovići
HAŠK Napredak	Ulović
Dubrave	Dubrave
Mladi Zadrugar	Donji Rahić
Hrvatski Dragovoljac	Boće

==== Second League of Central Bosnia Canton ====
Club	City / Town
Elektrobosna	Jajce
Dnoluka	Kruščica
Karaula	Karaula
Rudar	Han Bila
Gorica	Guča Gora
Kaćuni	Kaćuni
Lugovi	Lugovi
Bilalovac CPU	Bilalovac

==== Municipality League of Visoko - Group A ====
Club	City / Town
7. April	Buci
Stari Grad	Visoko
Sloboda	Vratnica
Gračanica	Gračanica
Poriječani	Poriječani
Dijamant	Grđevac
Uskok	Dobrinje
Moštre	Donje Moštre
Ljiljan	Zimča

==== Municipality League of Visoko - Group B ====
Club	City / Town
Goduša	Goduša
Kralupi	Kralupi
Zanatlija	Visoko
Bratstvo	Topuzovo Polje
Omladinac	Poriječani
Zmaj	Buzić Mahala
Monjare	Kološići
Liješeva	Liješeva

=== Republika Srpska ===
The fifth tier of football in Republika Srpska is made up of six local leagues which act as the second tier to the regional leagues: Prijedor, Gradiška and Banja Luka (all to Regional League - West), Doboj (to Regional League - Center), Center and Zvornik (to Regional League - East).
