= Brijesnica =

Brijesnica is the name of several villages in Bosnia and Herzegovina:

- Brijesnica (Bijeljina), in the municipality of Bijeljina
- Brijesnica Velika, in the municipality of Doboj East
- Brijesnica Mala, in the municipality of Doboj East
- Brijesnica Gornja, in the municipality of Lukavac
- Brijesnica Donja, in the municipality of Lukavac
