= Turija =

Turija may refer to:

== Places ==
=== Bosnia and Herzegovina ===
- Turija, Bihać
- Turija, Konjic
- Turija (Lukavac)

=== North Macedonia ===
- Turija, Delčevo

=== Serbia ===
- Turija (Bujanovac)
- Turija (Kučevo)
- Turija (Srbobran)

== Rivers ==
=== Serbia ===
- Turija (Kolubara), tributary of the Kolubara

=== Bosnia and Herzegovina ===
- Turija (Spreča), tributary of the Spreča

== See also ==
- Turiya (river), tributary of the Pripyat, Ukraine
- Turiya
