= Krajišnik (surname) =

Origin
- Origin: Serbian: krajište, krajina

Other names
- Variant form: Albanian: Kreshnik

Krajišnik is Serbian surname. The name is derived from the Serbian language term krajina or krajište (Serbian: krajište, крајиште) that had originally served as an administrative unit of the Serbian Empire or Despotate to designate border regions where the emperor or despot had not established solid and firm control due to raids from hostile neighboring provinces. The Albanian variant of the surname is Kreshnik.

Notable people with Krajišnik surname include:

- Damjan Krajišnik (born 1997), Bosnian footballer
- Gavro Vučković Krajišnik, Bosnian Serb politician, trader and writer
- Momčilo Krajišnik (1945–2020), Bosnian Serb politician
- Munever Krajišnik (born 1962), Yugoslav footballer
- Tina Krajišnik (born 1991), Serbian basketball player

== See also ==
- Krajišnik (disambiguation)
- Bosanska Krajina
- Bosansko Krajište
- Krajišnik (Gradiška)
- NK Krajišnik Velika Kladuša
