= Cerik =

Cerik may refer to:

- Cerik (Brčko), a village in Brčko, Bosnia and Herzegovina
- Cerik (Lukavac), a village in Lukavac, Bosnia and Herzegovina
- Cerik (Srebrenik), a village in Srebrenik, Bosnia and Herzegovina
- Cerik, Tuzla, a village in Tuzla, Bosnia and Herzegovina
- Cerik Aldebrandt, a character in Mage & Demon Queen
