= Crveno Brdo =

Crveno Brdo may refer to:

- Crveno Brdo (Lukavac), a village in Lukavac, Bosnia and Herzegovina
- Crveno Brdo (Srebrenik), a village in Srebrenik, Bosnia and Herzegovina
