= Radio Lukavac =

Bosnian radio station

Lukavac; Bosnia and Herzegovina
- Broadcast area: Tuzla Canton
- Frequency: Lukavac 96.7 MHz
- Branding: Public

Programming
- Language: Bosnian language
- Format: Local news, talk and music

Ownership
- Owner: JU Radio-televizija Lukavac
- Sister stations: TV Lukavac

History
- First air date: January 11, 1993

Technical information
- Transmitter coordinates: 44°33′N 18°31′E
- Repeater: Lukavac/Vijenac

Links
- Webcast: On website
- Website: www.rtvlukavac.ba

Radio Lukavac is a Bosnian local public radio station, broadcasting from Lukavac, Bosnia and Herzegovina.

It was launched during the war in Bosnia and Herzegovina on 11 January 1993 as local/municipal radio station. It broadcasts a variety of programs such as news, music, morning and talk shows. Program is mainly produced in Bosnian language.

Estimated number of potential listeners of Radio Lukavac in Tuzla Canton area is around 170.247. Local cable television channel TV Lukavac is also part of public municipality services. Program is available via IPTV platform Moja TV (Channel 186) for listeners in BiH and in diaspora.

== Frequencies ==
- Lukavac 96.7 MHz

== See also ==
- List of radio stations in Bosnia and Herzegovina
