= TV Lukavac =

Bosnian cable television station

- Country: Bosnia and Herzegovina
- Broadcast area: Lukavac
- Headquarters: Lukavac

Programming
- Language(s): Bosnian language
- Picture format: 4:3 576i SDTV

Ownership
- Owner: JAVNA USTANOVA RADIO-TELEVIZIJA LUKAVAC
- Sister channels: Radio Lukavac

History
- Launched: 2011.

Links
- Website: www.rtvlukavac.ba

TV Lukavac or Radio Televizija Lukavac is a local Bosnian public cable television channel based in Lukavac municipality, Tuzla Canton. It was established in 2011 when local Radio Lukavac started television broadcasting.

TV Lukavac broadcasts a variety of programs such as local news, local sports, mosaic and documentaries. Program is mainly produced in Bosnian language.

Radio Lukavac is also part of public municipality services.
