= Doboj East =

Village and municipality in Bosnia and Herzegovina

Coordinates: 44°44′00″N 18°11′20″E

Doboj East Doboj Istok Добој Исток
- Village and municipality
- Location of Doboj East within Bosnia and Herzegovina.
- Country: Bosnia and Herzegovina
- Entity: Federation of Bosnia and Herzegovina
- Canton: Tuzla Canton

Government
  - Municipal mayor: Kemal Bratić (SDA)

Area
  - Total: 41 km^{2} (16 sq mi)

Population (2013 census)
  - Total: 10,248
  - Density: 250/km^{2} (650/sq mi)
- Time zone: UTC+1 (CET)
  - Summer (DST): UTC+2 (CEST)
- Area code: +387 35
- Website: www.opcinadobojistok.ba

Doboj East (Serbian Cyrillic: Добој Исток) is a municipality located in the Tuzla Canton of the Federation of Bosnia and Herzegovina, an entity of Bosnia and Herzegovina. It was created in 1998, three years after the Dayton Peace Agreement by seceding from the municipality of Doboj. Today Doboj East is experiencing rapid urbanization, as well as economic and industrial growth. One reason for this occurrence might be the fact that the municipality is situated on the crossroads of several other rapidly developing or developed areas of Bosnia.

== Geography ==
Doboj East is situated between the city of Gračanica to the east and the city of Doboj to the west. To the south lies the Spreča river which also serves as the municipality's edge and subsequent border with Petrovo, Bosnia and Herzegovina. The Spreča valley covers the southern half of the municipality where the land is very fertile thus the area is mostly agricultural plots. Towards the north the elevation starts rising and the terrain is much hillier. This represents the southern part of the Trebava mountain.

== Settlements ==
Doboj East is composed of 5 settlements: Brijesnica Mala, Brijesnica Velika, Klokotnica, Lukavica Rijeka, and Stanić Rijeka, with Klokotnica being the seat of the municipality.

== Population ==
Locality	1991	2013
Brijesnica Mala	1.530	1.764
Brijesnica Velika	1.771	1.872
Klokotnica	3.989	4.874
Lukavica Rijeka	983	1.037
Stanić Rijeka	765	701
Total:	9.038	10.248

The population density of Doboj East is around 260/km² which, excluding the cities of Sarajevo and Tuzla, makes Doboj East the third most densely populated municipality in Bosnia and Herzegovina right behind Teočak and Doboj South. Almost all of the residents are Bosniaks (96%), with the rest being other ethnic groups (4%).

== History ==
The area of present-day Doboj East was populated since the Middle Ages, and according to some written documents Brijesnica Mala and Klokotnica were mentioned for the first time in 1528, while Lukavica Rijeka and Stanić Rijeka were first mentioned in 1533.

== Economy ==
The main industries in Doboj East are agriculture, the textile industry and the food industry.

== Tourism ==
Most tourists come to Doboj East for hunting, fishing and adventure tourism.

== See also ==
- Tuzla Canton
