= Bratstvo (disambiguation) =

Bratstvo ("brotherhood" in Slavic languages) was a network of religious communities in the 16th and 17th centuries.

Bratstvo may also refer to:

== Football clubs ==
- FK Bratstvo Cijevna, in Podgorica, Montenegro
- FK Bratstvo Lisičani, in Kičevo, Republic of Macedonia
- FK Bratstvo Krnjača, in Belgrade, Serbia
- NK Bratstvo Gračanica, in Gračanica, Bosnia and Herzegovina
- FK Bratstvo Bratunac, a football club in Bosnia and Herzegovina
- FK Bratstvo Resen, the former name of FK Jildirimspor, in Resen, Republic of North Macedonia

== Industry ==
- Bratstvo, an ammunition factory in Novi Travnik, Bosnia and Herzegovina
- Bratstvo, a restaurant once owned by Biserka in Macedonia
- Bratstvo, a steel manufacturing company in Aleksandrovo, Subotica, Serbia
- Bratstvo pipeline, part of the natural gas transmission system of Ukraine

== Other ==
- SS Bratstvo (1963), a Russian multi-purpose freighter
- Bratstvo (political party), a political group founded by Dmytro Korchynsky in 2002 in Ukraine
- Bratstvo (weekly), a Bulgarian-language newspaper in Serbia
- Bratstvo, a term for clans in the tribes of Montenegro
- Bratstvo-Telep, a local community in Telep, a neighborhood of Novi Sad, Vojvodina, Serbia
