= Krajišnici =

Krajišnici (pl.) is a Serbo-Croatian word meaning "frontiersmen". It may refer to:

- Krajišnici (Loznica), a village in Serbia
- Grenz infantry, light infantry troops from the Military Frontier of the Habsburg Monarchy
- Regional name ("people of Krajina") for the population from the territories of the former Croatian and Slavonian Military Frontiers
- Informal name for Serbs of Croatia
- Regional name for people from the region of Bosanska Krajina
- Regional name for people from the region of Timočka Krajina
- Designation for people from the former Republic of Serbian Krajina

== See also ==
- Krajišnik (disambiguation)
- Krajina, a Slavic toponym, meaning "frontier" or "march"
