= Caparde =

Caparde may refer to:

- Caparde, Osmaci, a village in Osmaci, Bosnia and Herzegovina
- Caparde (Lukavac), a village in Lukavac, Bosnia and Herzegovina
