= Gnojnica, Bosnia and Herzegovina =

Gnojnica
- Village
- Location within Bosnia and Herzegovina
- Coordinates: 44°36′47″N 18°25′32″E
- Country: Bosnia and Herzegovina
- Entity: Federation of Bosnia and Herzegovina
- Canton: Tuzla
- Municipality: Lukavac

Area
  - Total: 5.03 sq mi (13.04 km^{2})

Population (2013)
  - Total: 2,735
  - Density: 543.2/sq mi (209.7/km^{2})

Gnojnica is a village in the municipality of Lukavac, Bosnia and Herzegovina.

== Demographics ==
According to the 2013 census, its population was 2,735.

Ethnicity in 2013
Ethnicity	Number	Percentage
Bosniaks	2,642	96.6%
Croats	2	0.1%
Serbs	2	0.1%
other / undeclared	89	3.3%
Total	2,735	100%
