= Yugoslav football clubs =

The Prva Liga, operated by the Football Association of Yugoslavia, began holding national competitions in 1923. This spawned many new opportunities for teams to be organized, and prospective footballers looking to join. The boom began right after the First World War, and continued well until the break out of the Second World War.

Following World War II, like in the rest of the communist block all teams were de jure dissolved and either restructured completely on the stalinist model of multi-section sport associations with new ideologically friendly names and often completely new management, or simply kept dissolved and leaving a vacuum needing to be filled by new teams in their respective towns. Many of those oldest pre-World Wars teams are still in existence and turned to be the most successful teams in the former Yugoslavia.

== Pre-World War I Clubs (Kingdom of Serbia and parts of Austria-Hungary) ==
Club	Year	City	Description	Dissolution
Szabadkai Sport Egylet	1898	Subotica, Austria-Hungary	Dissolution date unknown.	?
Club Iris	1899	Pula, Austria-Hungary	Football section opened in August 1899. Dissolution date unknown.	?
Veloce Club Polese	1899	Pula Austria-Hungary	Football section of cycling club. Dissolution date unknown.	?
Laibacher Sportverein	1900	Ljubljana, Austria-Hungary		1909
SAK Bačka	1901	Subotica, Vojvodina	Later renamed to FK Bačka 1901.	Still active
Lendvai Football Egyesület	1903	Lendava, Austria-Hungary	Later renamed to NK Nafta 1903.	Still active
SK Soko	1903	Belgrade, Kingdom of Serbia	Later renamed to BASK.	Still active
SK Šumadija	1903	Kragujevac, Kingdom of Serbia	Later renamed to FK Šumadija 1903.	Still active
PNIŠK	1903	Zagreb, Austria-Hungary		1909
HAŠK	1903	Zagreb, Austria-Hungary		1945
Subotički SK	1903	Subotica, Vojvodina		1941
Club Sportivo Olimpia	1904	Rijeka, Austria-Hungary	Later renamed to NK Rijeka.	Still Active
Fiumei Atletikai Club	1905	Rijeka, Austria-Hungary	Dissolution date unknown.	?
Đački Športski Klub	1905	Mostar, Herzegovina	Dissolved in 1945 and revived in 1992 as HŠK Zrinjski.	Still active
Giovine Fiume	1906	Rijeka, Austria-Hungary		1912
Srpski mač Beograd	1906	Belgrade, Kingdom of Serbia	Founded as football section of Fencing Club.	1911
Athletik SK	1906	Celje, Austria-Hungary		1941
HŠK Concordia	1906	Zagreb, Austria-Hungary		1945
Törekves SE	1907	Rijeka, Austria/Hungary	Dissolution date unknown.	?
AŠK Croatia	1907	Zagreb, Austria-Hungary		1945
HŠK Victoria Sušak	1908	Sušak, Austria-Hungary		1948
Nagykikindai AC	1909	Kikinda, Vojvodina	Later renamed to OFK Kikinda	Still active
Marburger Sportverein	1909	Maribor, Austria-Hungary		1914
GŠK Marsonia	1909	Slavonski Brod, Austria-Hungary		Still active
Associazione Sportiva Edera	1910	Pula, Austria-Hungary		1926
NAK	1910	Novi Sad, Vojvodina		1944
Forza e Coraggio	1910	Dubrovnik, Austria-Hungary	Dissolution date unknown	?
Nogometni Odjel Sokola Opatija - Volosko	1911	Opatija, Austria-Hungary	Later renamed to NK Opatija.	Still Active
Unione Sportiva	1911	Dubrovnik, Austria-Hungary	Dissolution date unknown	?
Beogradski SK	1911	Belgrade, Kingdom of Serbia	Later renamed to OFK Beograd	Still active
SK Takovo	1911	Gornji Milanovac, Kingdom of Serbia		Still active
SK Ilirija	1911	Ljubljana, Austria-Hungary	Later renamed to ND Ilirija 1911.	Still active
JSK Hajduk	1911	Split, Austria-Hungary		Still active
1. HŠK Građanski	1911	Zagreb, Austria-Hungary	Later renamed to GNK Dinamo.	Still active
DFV Vorwärts Abbazia	1912	Opatija, Austria-Hungary	German minority club. Official dissolution date unknown.	?
Tornai SC	1912	Rijeka, Austria-Hungary	Hungarian minority club. Official dissolution date unknown.	?
Javor	1912	Ivanjica, Kingdom of Serbia		Still active
K.A.F.C.	1912	Kula, Vojvodina		1944
Somborski SK	1912	Sombor, Vojvodina	Later renamed to Radnički Sombor	Still active
HRŠD Anarh	1912	Split, Austria-Hungary	Later renamed to RNK Split	Still active
HŠK Slaven	1912	Koprivnica, Austria-Hungary		Still active
SK Velika Srbija	1913	Belgrade, Serbia	Later renamed to Jugoslavija	June 1945
RSK Lovćen Cetinje	1913	Cetinje, Kingdom of Montenegro		Still active
SK Slovan	1913	Ljubljana, Austria-Hungary		Still active
SK Lav	1913	Knin, Austria-Hungary		Still active
SK Vojvodina	1914	Novi Sad, Vojvodina		Still active

== Pre-World War II Clubs (Kingdom of Yugoslavia) ==
Club	Year	City	Description	Dissolution
FK Bor	1919	Bor, Serbia	N/A	N/A
NK Jedinstvo Bihać	1919	Bihać, Bosnia	N/A	N/A
NK Čelik Zenica	1921	Zenica, Bosnia	N/A	N/A
FK Željezničar Sarajevo	1921	Sarajevo, Bosnia	N/A	N/A
FK Velež Mostar	1922	Mostar, Herzegovina	N/A	N/A
NK Travnik	1922	Travnik, Bosnia	N/A	N/A
FK Radnički Niš	1923	Niš, Serbia	N/A	N/A
FK Dubočica	1923	Leskovac, Serbia	N/A	N/A
NK Jadran Visoko	1923	Visoko, Bosnia	Merged with Radnički to form NK Bosna	1953
FK Budućnost Podgorica	1925	Podgorica, Montenegro	N/A	N/A
FK Žarkovo	1925	Žarkovo, Serbia	N/A	N/A
FK Sloboda Tuzla	1925	Tuzla, Bosnia	N/A	N/A
FK Leotar Trebinje	1925	Trebinje, Bosnia	N/A	N/A
FK Hajduk Kula	1925	Kula, Serbia	N/A	2013
FK Borac Banja Luka	1926	Banja Luka, Bosnia	N/A	N/A
FK Borac Čačak	1926	Čačak, Serbia	N/A	N/A
FK Rudar Kakanj	1928	Kakanj, Bosnia	N/A	N/A
FK Krajina Cazin	1932	Cazin, Bosnia	N/A	N/A
NK Radnički Visoko	1934	Visoko, Bosnia	Merged with Jadran to form NK Bosna	1953
NK Herceg Stjepan, Goražde	1918	Goražde, Bosnia	Merged with GOŠK Goražde to form FK Radnički Goražde.	1961

== Post-War Clubs (Socialist Federal Republic of Yugoslavia) ==
Club	Year	City	Description	Dissolution
FK Kozara Bosanska Gradiška	1945	Kozara, Bosnia	N/A	N/A
FK Sarajevo	1946	Sarajevo, Bosnia	N/A	N/A
NK Iskra Bugojno	1947	Bugojno, Bosnia	N/A	N/A
FK Budućnost Banovići	1947	Banovići, Bosnia	N/A	N/A
NK Posušje	1950	Posušje, Herzegovina	N/A	N/A
FK Mladost Lučani	1952	Lučani, Serbia	N/A	N/A
NK Bosna Visoko	1953	Visoko, Bosnia	Created by merging NK Radnički and NK Jadran	N/A
NK Brotnjo	1955	Čitluk, Herzegovina	N/A	N/A
FK Rad Beograd	1958	Belgrade, Serbia	N/A	N/A
FK Mladost Gacko	1970	Gacko, Bosnia	N/A	N/A

== See also ==
- Yugoslav Cup
- Yugoslav League Championship
- Football Association of Yugoslavia
- List of football clubs in Bosnia and Herzegovina
- List of football clubs in Croatia
- List of football clubs in Kosovo
- List of football clubs in Montenegro
- List of football clubs in North Macedonia
- List of football clubs in Serbia
- List of football clubs in Slovenia
