= Priluk, Živinice =

Priluk
- Village
- Location within Bosnia and Herzegovina
- Coordinates: 44.4697°N 18.5187°E
- Country: Bosnia and Herzegovina
- Entity: Federation of Bosnia and Herzegovina
- Canton: Tuzla
- Municipality: Živinice

Area
  - Total: 3.68 sq mi (9.54 km^{2})

Population (2013)
  - Total: 2,260
  - Density: 614/sq mi (237/km^{2})
- Time zone: UTC+1 (CET)
  - Summer (DST): UTC+2 (CEST)

Priluk is a village in the municipality of Živinice, Bosnia and Herzegovina. It is located at the southern shore of Lake Modrac.

== Demographics ==
According to the 2013 census, its population was 2,260.

Ethnicity in 2013
Ethnicity	Number	Percentage
Bosniaks	2,234	98.8%
Croats	3	0.1%
other/undeclared	23	1.0%
Total	2,260	100%
