= Krajišnik =

Krajišnik (meaning 'man from krajina' in Serbo-Croatian) may refer to:

- Krajišnik (surname)
- Krajišnik, Bosnia and Herzegovina, Bosnian village in the Gradiška municipality
- Krajišnik, Sečanj, Serbian village in the Sečanj municipality
- NK Krajišnik Velika Kladuša, Bosnian association football club
- Military Frontier soldier or resident

== See also ==
- Bosanska Krajina
- Kreshnik, a given name and surname
