= Stupari (Lukavac) =

- Village
- Location within Bosnia and Herzegovina
- Country: Bosnia and Herzegovina
- Entity: Federation of Bosnia and Herzegovina
- Canton: Tuzla
- Municipality: Lukavac

Area
  - Total: 4.23 sq mi (10.95 km^{2})

Population (2013)
  - Total: 178
  - Density: 42.1/sq mi (16.3/km^{2})

Stupari is a village in the municipality of Lukavac, Bosnia and Herzegovina.

== Demographics ==
According to the 2013 census, its population was 178.

Ethnicity in 2013
Ethnicity	Number	Percentage
Serbs	174	97.8%
Croats	1	0.6%
other/undeclared	3	1.7%
Total	178	100%
