= Modrac =

Village in Bosnia and Herzegovina

- Village
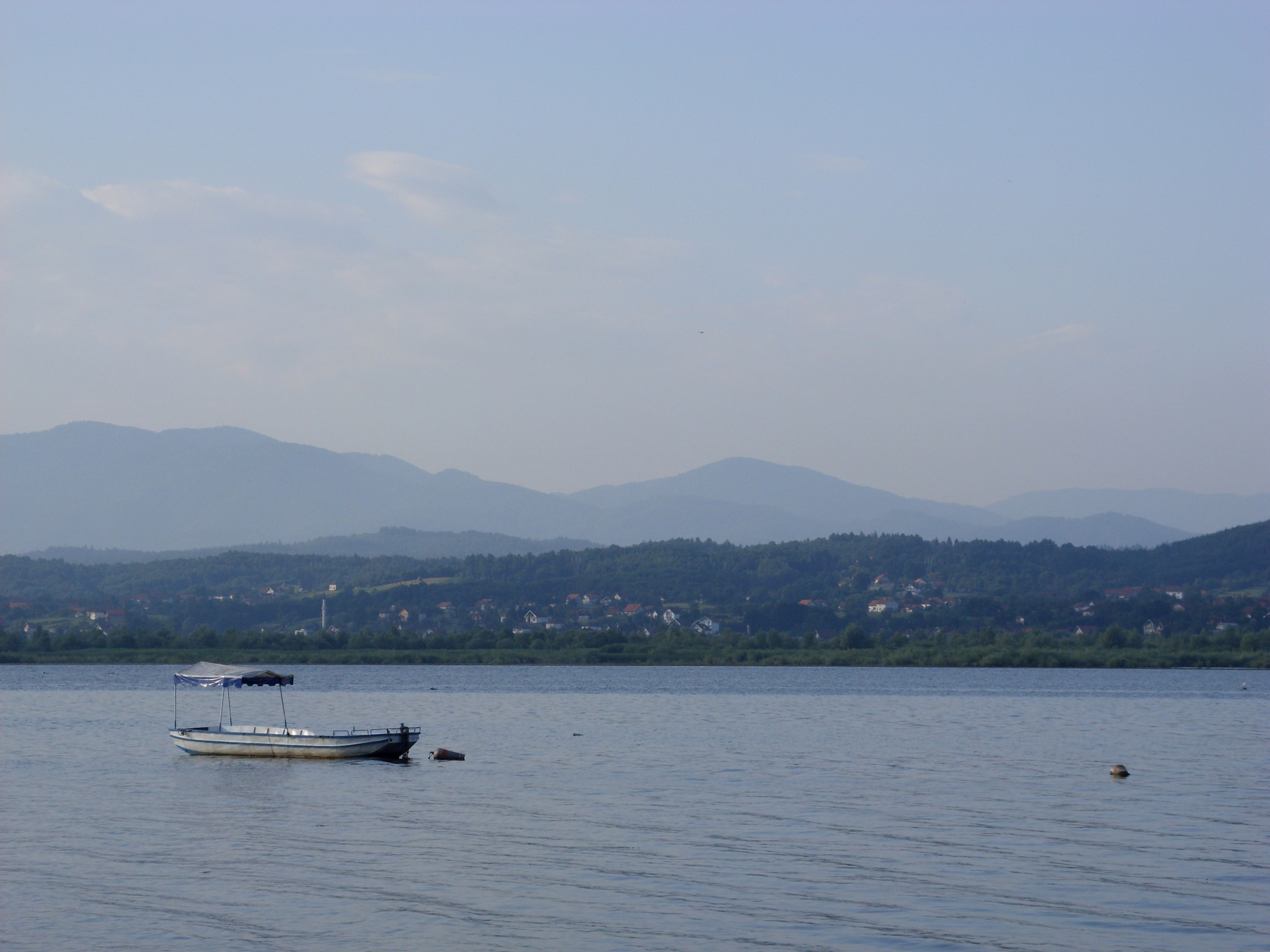

- Location within Bosnia and Herzegovina
- Coordinates: 44°31′N 18°31′E
- Country: Bosnia and Herzegovina
- Entity: Federation of Bosnia and Herzegovina
- Canton: Tuzla
- Municipality: Lukavac

Area
  - Total: 0.52 sq mi (1.35 km^{2})

Population (2013)
  - Total: 633
  - Density: 1,210/sq mi (469/km^{2})

Modrac is a village in the municipality of Lukavac, Bosnia and Herzegovina.

== Demographics ==
According to the 2013 census, its population was 633.

Ethnicity in 2013
Ethnicity	Number	Percentage
Bosniaks	604	95.4%
Croats	1	0.2%
other/undeclared	28	4.4%
Total	633	100%

== See also ==
- Modrac Lake
