= Vijenac (Lukavac) =

Vijenac Вијенац
- Village
- Location within Bosnia and Herzegovina
- Coordinates: 44°27′28″N 18°26′35″E
- Country: Bosnia and Herzegovina
- Entity: Federation of Bosnia and Herzegovina
- Canton: Tuzla
- Municipality: Lukavac

Area
  - Total: 1.01 sq mi (2.61 km^{2})

Population (2013)
  - Total: 41
  - Density: 41/sq mi (16/km^{2})

Vijenac is a village in the municipality of Lukavac, Bosnia and Herzegovina.

== Demographics ==
According to the 2013 census, its population was 41.

Ethnicity in 2013
Ethnicity	Number	Percentage
Bosniaks	40	97.6%
Serbs	1	2.4%
Total	41	100%
