= Šikulje (Lukavac) =

- Village
- Location within Bosnia and Herzegovina
- Country: Bosnia and Herzegovina
- Entity: Federation of Bosnia and Herzegovina
- Canton: Tuzla
- Municipality: Lukavac

Area
  - Total: 1.49 sq mi (3.87 km^{2})

Population (2013)
  - Total: 371
  - Density: 248/sq mi (95.9/km^{2})

Šikulje is a village in the municipality of Lukavac, Bosnia and Herzegovina.

== Demographics ==
According to the 2013 census, its population was 371.

Ethnicity in 2013
Ethnicity	Number	Percentage
Bosniaks	330	88.9%
other/undeclared	41	11.1%
Total	371	100%
