= Bistarac Gornji =

- Village
- Location within Bosnia and Herzegovina
- Coordinates: 44°32′N 18°33′E
- Country: Bosnia and Herzegovina
- Entity: Federation of Bosnia and Herzegovina
- Canton: Tuzla
- Municipality: Lukavac

Area
  - Total: 1.27 sq mi (3.29 km^{2})

Population (2013)
  - Total: 899
  - Density: 708/sq mi (273/km^{2})

Bistarac Gornji is a village in the municipality of Lukavac, Bosnia and Herzegovina.

== Demographics ==
According to the 2013 census, its population was 899.

Ethnicity in 2013
Ethnicity	Number	Percentage
Bosniaks	477	53.1%
Croats	278	30.9%
Serbs	29	3.2%
other/undeclared	115	12.8%
Total	899	100%
