= Smoluća Gornja =

- Village
- Location within Bosnia and Herzegovina
- Country: Bosnia and Herzegovina
- Entity: Federation of Bosnia and Herzegovina
- Canton: Tuzla
- Municipality: Lukavac

Area
  - Total: 3.86 sq mi (10.01 km^{2})

Population (2013)
  - Total: 6
  - Density: 1.6/sq mi (0.60/km^{2})

Smoluća Gornja is a village in the municipality of Lukavac, Federation of Bosnia and Herzegovina.

== Demographics ==
According to the 2013 census, its population was 6. According to the 1991 census, Smoluća Gornja had 737 inhabitants.

National structure of the population in Smoluća Gornja
Ethnicity	2013	1991	1981	1971
Serbs	0	710	804	849
Bosniaks	4	2	3	12
Croats			2	1
Slovenes			3	
other	2	25	2	2
Total	6	737	814	864

== Bosnian War ==
In June 1992, during the attack by the ARBiH the Bosnian Serb population of the surrounding settlements was expelled to Smoluća. At that time, there were 7,500 displaced Serbs in the village, who were under siege for three months until August when they were liberated by the Vojska Republike Srpske. Until August, the entire population of Smoluca was left without water, electricity, food, and medicine, while Bosnian forces denied the Red Cross access and the delivery of food and medicine, as well as the evacuation of children and the sick.

During the siege from June 18 to August 27, 1992, 50 Serbs perished in the Smoluća area, and a total of 149 in the broader region.

After the evacuation of the population on August 29, 1992, Smoluća was completely looted and burned down by Bosniak and Croatian units.
