= Stanić Rijeka =

Stanić Rijeka Станић Ријека
- Village
- Location within Bosnia and Herzegovina
- Coordinates: 44°43′49″N 18°08′17″E
- Country: Bosnia and Herzegovina
- Entity: Republika Srpska; Federation of Bosnia and Herzegovina
- Region Canton: Doboj; Tuzla
- Municipality: Doboj; Doboj Istok

Area
  - Total: 2.83 sq mi (7.32 km^{2})

Population (2013)
  - Total: 1,756
  - Density: 621/sq mi (240/km^{2})
- Time zone: UTC+1 (CET)
  - Summer (DST): UTC+2 (CEST)

Stanić Rijeka (Cyrillic: Станић Ријека) is a village in the municipalities of Doboj (Republika Srpska) and Doboj East, Bosnia and Herzegovina.

== Demographics ==
According to the 2013 census, its population was 1,756, with 1,055 of them living in the Doboj municipality, and 701 in the Doboj East part.

Ethnicity in 2013
| Ethnicity | Number | Percentage |
|---|---|---|
| Bosniaks | 1,300 | 74.0% |
| Serbs | 416 | 23.7% |
| Croats | 3 | 0.2% |
| other/undeclared | 37 | 2.1% |
| Total | 1,756 | 100% |
