= Tabaci =

- Village
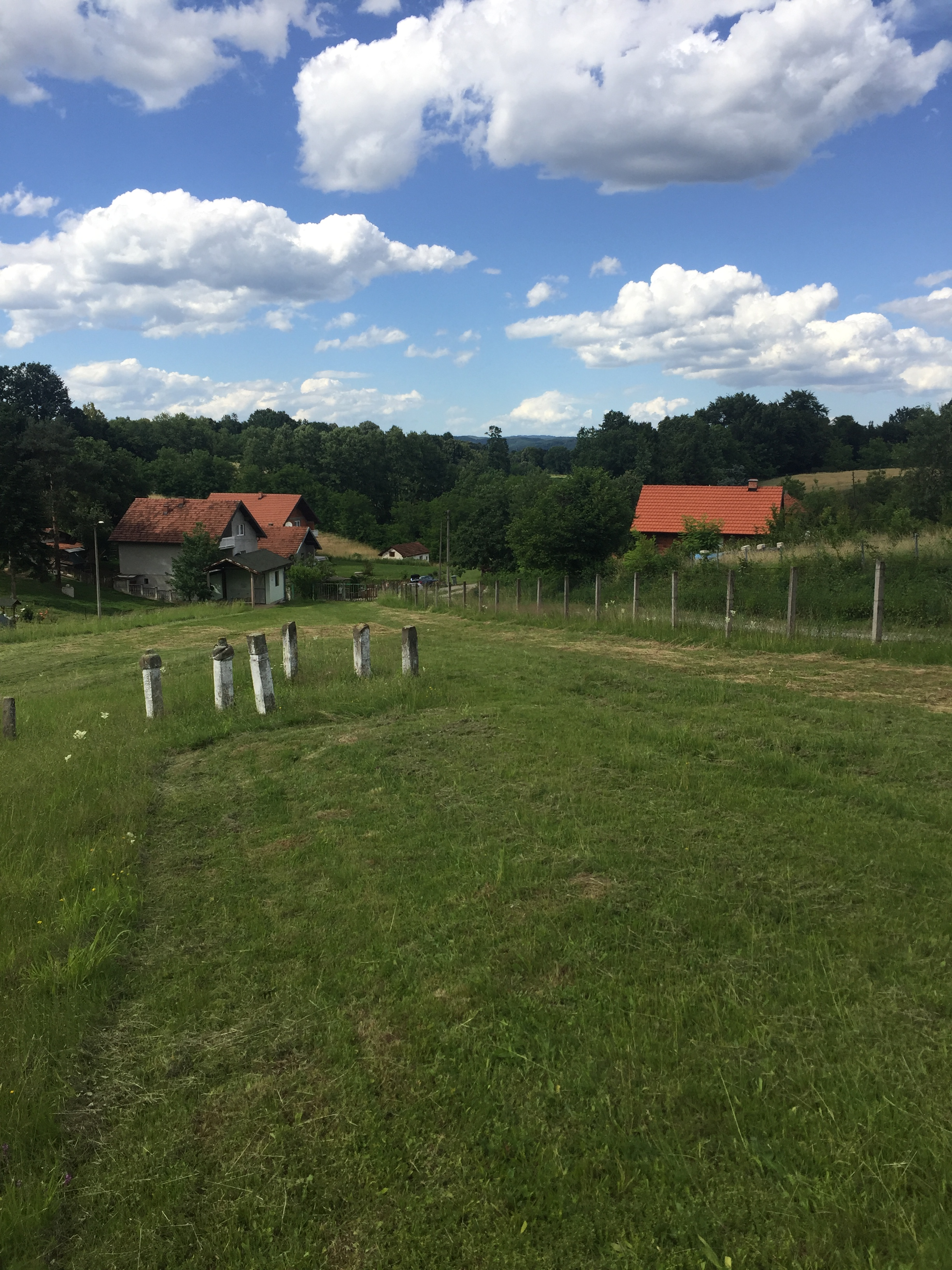

- Location within Bosnia and Herzegovina
- Country: Bosnia and Herzegovina
- Entity: Federation of Bosnia and Herzegovina
- Canton: Tuzla
- Municipality: Lukavac

Area
  - Total: 1.05 sq mi (2.72 km^{2})

Population (2013)
  - Total: 654
  - Density: 623/sq mi (240/km^{2})

Tabaci is a village in the municipality of Lukavac, Bosnia and Herzegovina.

== Demographics ==
According to the 2013 census, its population was 654.

Ethnicity in 2013
Ethnicity	Number	Percentage
Bosniaks	633	96.8%
Serbs	2	0.3%
other/undeclared	19	2.9%
Total	654	100%
