= Vasiljevci =

- Village
- Location within Bosnia and Herzegovina
- Country: Bosnia and Herzegovina
- Entity: Federation of Bosnia and Herzegovina
- Canton: Tuzla
- Municipality: Lukavac

Area
  - Total: 4.47 sq mi (11.58 km^{2})

Population (2013)
  - Total: 100
  - Density: 22/sq mi (8.6/km^{2})

Vasiljevci is a village in the municipality of Lukavac, Bosnia and Herzegovina.

== Demographics ==
According to the 2013 census, its population was 100.

Ethnicity in 2013
| Ethnicity | Number | Percentage |
|---|---|---|
| Serbs | 98 | 98.0% |
| Bosniaks | 2 | 2.0% |
| Total | 100 | 100% |
