= Kalajevo (Lukavac) =

- Village
- Location within Bosnia and Herzegovina
- Coordinates: 44°32′N 18°34′E
- Country: Bosnia and Herzegovina
- Entity: Federation of Bosnia and Herzegovina
- Canton: Tuzla
- Municipality: Lukavac

Area
  - Total: 0.48 sq mi (1.25 km^{2})

Population (2013)
  - Total: 69
  - Density: 140/sq mi (55/km^{2})

Kalajevo is a village in the municipality of Lukavac, Bosnia and Herzegovina.

== Demographics ==
According to the 2013 census, its population was 69.

Ethnicity in 2013
Ethnicity	Number	Percentage
Croats	52	75.4%
Bosniaks	10	14.5%
Serbs	4	5.8%
other/undeclared	3	4.3%
Total	69	100%
