= Lukavac Gornji =

Village in Bosnia and Herzegovina

Lukavac Gornji Лукавац Горњи
- Village
- Location within Bosnia and Herzegovina
- Coordinates: 44.5841086°N 18.5286252°E
- Country: Bosnia and Herzegovina
- Entity: Federation of Bosnia and Herzegovina
- Canton: Tuzla
- Municipality: Lukavac

Area
  - Total: 2.31 sq mi (5.99 km^{2})

Population (2013)
  - Total: 14
  - Density: 6.1/sq mi (2.3/km^{2})

Lukavac Gornji (Cyrillic: Лукавац Горњи) is a village in the municipality of Lukavac, Bosnia and Herzegovina.

== Demographics ==
According to the 2013 census, its population was 14.

Ethnicity in 2013
Ethnicity	Number	Percentage
Bosniaks	9	64.3%
Serbs	4	28.6%
Croats	1	7.1%
Total	14	100%
