= Komari (Lukavac) =

- Village
- Location within Bosnia and Herzegovina
- Coordinates: 44.5637711°N 18.3819292°E
- Country: Bosnia and Herzegovina
- Entity: Federation of Bosnia and Herzegovina
- Canton: Tuzla
- Municipality: Lukavac

Area
  - Total: 1.13 sq mi (2.93 km^{2})

Population (2013)
  - Total: 46
  - Density: 41/sq mi (16/km^{2})

Komari is a village in the municipality of Lukavac, Bosnia and Herzegovina.

== Demographics ==
According to the 2013 census, its population was 46.

Ethnicity in 2013
Ethnicity	Number	Percentage
Serbs	45	97.8%
other/undeclared	1	2.2%
Total	46	100%
