= Milino Selo (Lukavac) =

- Village
- Location within Bosnia and Herzegovina
- Coordinates: 44°32′15″N 18°24′56″E
- Country: Bosnia and Herzegovina
- Entity: Federation of Bosnia and Herzegovina
- Canton: Tuzla
- Municipality: Lukavac

Area
  - Total: 4.72 sq mi (12.22 km^{2})

Population (2013)
  - Total: 320
  - Density: 68/sq mi (26/km^{2})

Milino Selo is a village in the municipality of Lukavac, Bosnia and Herzegovina.

== Demographics ==
According to the 2013 census, its population was 320.

Ethnicity in 2013
Ethnicity	Number	Percentage
Bosniaks	203	63.4%
Serbs	58	18.1%
Croats	2	0.6%
other/undeclared	57	17.8%
Total	320	100%
