= Bistarac Donji =

- Village
- Location within Bosnia and Herzegovina
- Coordinates: 44°31′N 18°34′E
- Country: Bosnia and Herzegovina
- Entity: Federation of Bosnia and Herzegovina
- Canton: Tuzla
- Municipality: Lukavac

Area
  - Total: 2.03 sq mi (5.27 km^{2})

Population (2013)
  - Total: 1,116
  - Density: 548/sq mi (212/km^{2})

Bistarac Donji is a village in the municipality of Lukavac, Bosnia and Herzegovina.

== Demographics ==
According to the 2013 census, its population was 1,116.

Ethnicity in 2013
Ethnicity	Number	Percentage
Croats	766	68.6%
Bosniaks	285	25.5%
Serbs	29	2.6%
other/undeclared	36	3.2%
Total	1,116	100%
