= Tumare =

- Village
- Location within Bosnia and Herzegovina
- Coordinates: 44.5308°N 18.3528°E
- Country: Bosnia and Herzegovina
- Entity: Federation of Bosnia and Herzegovina
- Canton: Tuzla
- Municipality: Lukavac

Area
  - Total: 6.08 sq mi (15.75 km^{2})

Population (2013)
  - Total: 73
  - Density: 12/sq mi (4.6/km^{2})

Tumare is a village in the municipality of Lukavac, Bosnia and Herzegovina.

== Demographics ==
According to the 2013 census, its population was 73.

Ethnicity in 2013
Ethnicity	Number	Percentage
Serbs	72	98.6%
Other/undeclared	1	1.4%
Total	73	100%

== Landmarks ==
=== Remnants of Monument ===
A memorial honoring Predrag Marković Alimpije is located on the promontory known as Mrka Ploča, at the site of his death in January 1944. The site originally featured a metal fence surrounding an area with one or more plaques inscribed in Cyrillic script.

By 2004, the memorial had fallen into disrepair. The plaques were broken, and the monument was overtaken by vegetation, though the metal fence still stood. By 2018, during a field inspection, it was found that the metal fencing had been removed. Only fragments of the concrete foundation remained, some appearing to have been deliberately moved.

=== Memorial Fountain ===
Also in Mrka Ploča, a monument with an unknown origin which once functioned as a fountain can be located. Today, the monument is in a condition of severe deterioration with the fountain no longer functioning. The plaque, however, remains intact, with "SPOMEN ČESMA PODIGNUTA U ZNAK AHVALNOSTI NIKIĆ SLAVKU I CVIJETI" inscribed on it. In English, this translates to "MEMORIAL FOUNTAIN ERECTED IN GRATITUDE TO SLAVKO AND CVIJETA NIKIĆ."

=== Bust of Predrag Marković Alimpije ===
This sculpture was unveiled outside Tumare's elementary school in 1985 and was the work of Pero Jelisić, an artist from nearby Tuzla. It was dedicated to Predrag Marković Alimpije, a notable Partisan fighter. Nowadays, the bust has gone, with only the pedestal (made of Jablanica granite) remaining. It is believed that this destruction was caused by the intensity of battle in Tumare during the Bosnian War; however, this remains speculative.

== Bosnian War ==
=== Armament Relocation ===
During the Bosnian War, a major military operation involved relocating 5,270 barrels of armament and 140 tons of ammunition from Doboj to Mt. Tumare, which is about 10 kilometers northeast of Zavidovići. Doboj was a key logistics hub during the conflict, and moving such a large cache of weapons and ammunition to Tumare highlights the importance of this area for military purposes. This move was part of broader strategies to secure strategic locations and ensure that crucial supplies were readily available for ongoing operations.

=== Heliport Usage ===
During the Bosnian War, Serbia utilized a large number of helicopter units extensively for various military purposes. These helicopters, including transport, patrolling, and anti-tank types, provided critical air support, facilitated troop movements, and transported new forces. They were also essential for supplying units with resources and for the evacuation of casualties and those needing medical care. The heliports at several locations, one of which being Ozren (Tumare), were essential to these operations, further highlighting the strategic significance of Tumare and its surroundings in the overall logistics and military strategy of the conflict.
