= Orahovica (Lukavac) =

- Village
- Location within Bosnia and Herzegovina
- Country: Bosnia and Herzegovina
- Entity: Federation of Bosnia and Herzegovina
- Canton: Tuzla
- Municipality: Lukavac

Area
  - Total: 5.92 sq mi (15.32 km^{2})

Population (2013)
  - Total: 332
  - Density: 56.1/sq mi (21.7/km^{2})

Orahovica is a village in the municipality of Lukavac, Bosnia and Herzegovina.

== Demographics ==
According to the 2013 census, its population was 332.

Ethnicity in 2013
Ethnicity	Number	Percentage
Bosniaks	330	99.4%
other/undeclared	2	0.6%
Total	332	100%
