= Srđevići, Livno =

Srđevići
- Village
- Interactive map of Srđevići
- Coordinates: 43.76°N 16.93°E
- Country: Bosnia and Herzegovina
- Entity: Federation of Bosnia and Herzegovina
- Canton: Canton 10
- Township: Livno

Srđevići is a village in the Township of Livno in Canton 10 of the Federation of Bosnia and Herzegovina, an entity of Bosnia and Herzegovina. It is situated in the Livanjsko Polje, one of the largest karst fields in the region, known for its history, natural environment, and agricultural traditions.

The village's cultural identity is rooted in a deep Croatian heritage, traditional customs, and a rural way of life. Srđevići is located in an area of rolling hills, fertile fields, and a small reservoir, making it a key part of the Livno agricultural region.

Historically, Srđevići has been a traditional agricultural settlement, with most residents engaged in livestock farming and dairy production, particularly the Livanjski cheese. The village has also attracted interest in eco-tourism and rural tourism, due to its landscapes, historical significance, and traditional village life.

== Geography ==
Srđevići is located in the southwestern part of Bosnia and Herzegovina, approximately 10 km from Livno. It lies within the Livanjsko Polje, one of the largest karst fields in the region.

The area has a continental climate, with cold winters and warm summers.

The landscape around Srđevići includes hills, agricultural fields, and a small reservoir. Other water sources include small streams that contribute to the regional water network.

== Population ==
=== Census data 1971 – 1991 ===
Census Year	1991	1981	1971
Croats	1,087 (99.36%)	1,058 (99.81%)	1,189 (99.83%)
Muslims	1 (0.09%)	0	0
Serbs	1 (0.09%)	0	0
Yugoslavs	0	0	0
Others / Unknown	5 (0.45%)	2 (0.18%)	2 (0.16%)
Total	1,094	1,060	1,191

=== Census data 2025 ===
Census Year	2025
Croats	1099 (100%)
Bosniaks	0
Serbs	0
Others / Unknown	0
Total	1099

== Economy ==
The economy of Srđevići is primarily based on:

- Agriculture: Livestock farming, dairy production, and wheat cultivation.
- Dairy industry: The area is known for Livanjski cheese, a high-quality regional product.
- Handicrafts: Traditional woodworking and textile production.
- Rural tourism: Growing eco-tourism sector due to the village's scenery.

== Culture and traditions ==
Srđevići is known for preserving its rich cultural heritage and traditional customs.

Cultural highlights include folk music & dance (including traditional Croatian songs and performances), religious celebrations (with annual Catholic festivities) and traditional crafts. The latter includes handmade wool textiles and wood carvings.

== Sports ==
NK Junak Srđevići is the local football club.

== Notable surnames ==
The most common surnames in Srđevići include Vukadin, Mamić and Ojvan. These surnames reflect the historical Croatian roots of the village.
