= Jaruške Gornje =

- Village
- Location within Bosnia and Herzegovina
- Country: Bosnia and Herzegovina
- Entity: Federation of Bosnia and Herzegovina
- Canton: Tuzla
- Municipality: Lukavac

Area
  - Total: 2.65 sq mi (6.87 km^{2})

Population (2013)
  - Total: 482
  - Density: 182/sq mi (70.2/km^{2})

Jaruške Gornje is a village in the municipality of Lukavac, Bosnia and Herzegovina.

== Demographics ==
According to the 2013 census, its population was 482.

Ethnicity in 2013
Ethnicity	Number	Percentage
Bosniaks	444	92.1%
Serbs	2	0.4%
other/undeclared	36	7.5%
Total	482	100%
