= Berkovica =

- Village
- Location within Bosnia and Herzegovina
- Coordinates: 44°37′N 18°26′E
- Country: Bosnia and Herzegovina
- Entity: Federation of Bosnia and Herzegovina
- Canton: Tuzla
- Municipality: Lukavac

Area
  - Total: 2.01 sq mi (5.20 km^{2})

Population (2013)
  - Total: 666
  - Density: 332/sq mi (128/km^{2})

Berkovica is a village in the municipality of Lukavac, Bosnia and Herzegovina.

== Demographics ==
According to the 2013 census, its population was 666.

Ethnicity in 2013
| Ethnicity | Number | Percentage |
|---|---|---|
| Bosniaks | 648 | 97.3% |
| Croats | 1 | 0.2% |
| other/undeclared | 17 | 2.6% |
| Total | 666 | 100% |
