= Lukavica Rijeka =

Lukavica Rijeka Лукавица Ријека
- Village
- Location within Bosnia and Herzegovina
- Coordinates: 44°46′12″N 18°09′36″E
- Country: Bosnia and Herzegovina
- Entity: Federation of Bosnia and Herzegovina; Republika Srpska
- Canton Region: Tuzla; Doboj
- Municipality: Doboj Istok; Doboj

Area
  - Total: 3.75 sq mi (9.72 km^{2})

Population (2013)
  - Total: 1,037
  - Density: 276/sq mi (107/km^{2})
- Time zone: UTC+1 (CET)
  - Summer (DST): UTC+2 (CEST)

Lukavica Rijeka (Serbian Cyrillic: Лукавица Ријека) is a village in the municipalities of Doboj (Republika Srpska) and Doboj East, Bosnia and Herzegovina.

== Demographics ==
According to the 2013 census, its population was 1,037, all of them living in the Doboj East part, thus none in Doboj municipality.

Ethnicity in 2013
| Ethnicity | Number | Percentage |
|---|---|---|
| Bosniaks | 1,034 | 99.7% |
| other/undeclared | 3 | 0.3% |
| Total | 1,037 | 100% |
