= Smoluća Donja =

Smoluća Donja Смолућа Доња
- Village
- Location within Bosnia and Herzegovina
- Country: Bosnia and Herzegovina
- Entity: Federation of Bosnia and Herzegovina
- Canton: Tuzla
- Municipality: Lukavac

Area
  - Total: 4.49 sq mi (11.63 km^{2})

Population (2013)
  - Total: 21
  - Density: 4.7/sq mi (1.8/km^{2})

Smoluća Donja (Cyrillic: Смолућа Доња) is a village in the municipality of Lukavac, Bosnia and Herzegovina.

== Demographics ==
According to the 2013 census, its population was 21.

National structure of the population in Smoluća Donja
Ethnicity	2013	1991	1981	1971
Serbs	4	1,318	1,245	1,054
Bosniaks	17	6	1	
Croats		6	2	5
Montenegrins			7	1
other		65	11	6
Total	21	1,395	1,266	1,066
