= Prokosovići =

- Village
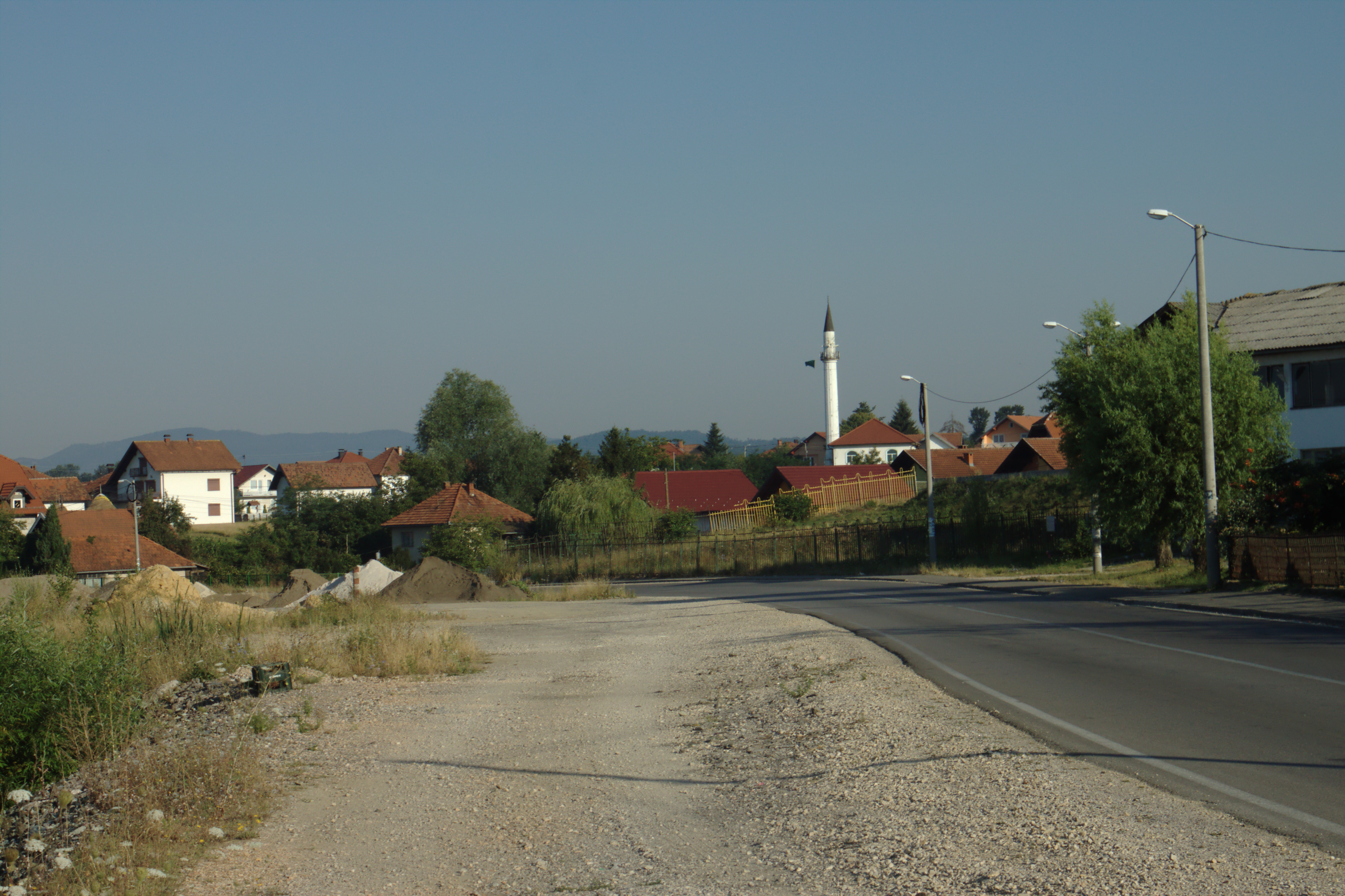

- Location within Bosnia and Herzegovina
- Coordinates: 44°31′N 18°29′E
- Country: Bosnia and Herzegovina
- Entity: Federation of Bosnia and Herzegovina
- Canton: Tuzla
- Municipality: Lukavac

Area
  - Total: 1.78 sq mi (4.62 km^{2})

Population (2013)
  - Total: 1,503
  - Density: 843/sq mi (325/km^{2})

Prokosovići is a village in the municipality of Lukavac, Bosnia and Herzegovina. It is located on the north shore of Modrac Lake.

== Demographics ==
According to the 2013 census, its population was 1,503.

Ethnicity in 2013
Ethnicity	Number	Percentage
Bosniaks	1,397	92.9%
Croats	2	0.1%
Serbs	8	0.5%
other/undeclared	96	6.4%
Total	1,503	100%
