= Jaruške Donje =

- Village
- Location within Bosnia and Herzegovina
- Coordinates: 44°29′47″N 18°24′47″E
- Country: Bosnia and Herzegovina
- Entity: Federation of Bosnia and Herzegovina
- Canton: Tuzla
- Municipality: Lukavac

Area
  - Total: 1.36 sq mi (3.51 km^{2})

Population (2013)
  - Total: 89
  - Density: 66/sq mi (25/km^{2})

Jaruške Donje is a village in the municipality of Lukavac, Bosnia and Herzegovina.

== Demographics ==
According to the 2013 census, its population was 89.

Ethnicity in 2013
Ethnicity	Number	Percentage
Bosniaks	88	98.9%
other/undeclared	1	1.1%
Total	89	100%
