= Mičijevići =

- Village
- Location within Bosnia and Herzegovina
- Coordinates: 44°32′49″N 18°18′53″E
- Country: Bosnia and Herzegovina
- Entity: Federation of Bosnia and Herzegovina
- Canton: Tuzla
- Municipality: Lukavac

Area
  - Total: 3.55 sq mi (9.19 km^{2})

Population (2013)
  - Total: 40
  - Density: 11/sq mi (4.4/km^{2})

Mičijevići is a village in the municipality of Lukavac, Bosnia and Herzegovina.

== Demographics ==
According to the 2013 census, its population was 40, all Serbs.
