= Borice (Lukavac) =

- Village
- Location within Bosnia and Herzegovina
- Coordinates: 44.5503526°N 18.4048465°E
- Country: Bosnia and Herzegovina
- Entity: Federation of Bosnia and Herzegovina
- Canton: Tuzla
- Municipality: Lukavac

Area
  - Total: 0.76 sq mi (1.98 km^{2})

Population (2013)
  - Total: 29
  - Density: 38/sq mi (15/km^{2})

Borice is a village in the municipality of Lukavac, Bosnia and Herzegovina.

== Demographics ==
According to the 2013 census, its population was 29, all Serbs.
