= Munever Krajišnik =

Yugoslav footballer and coach

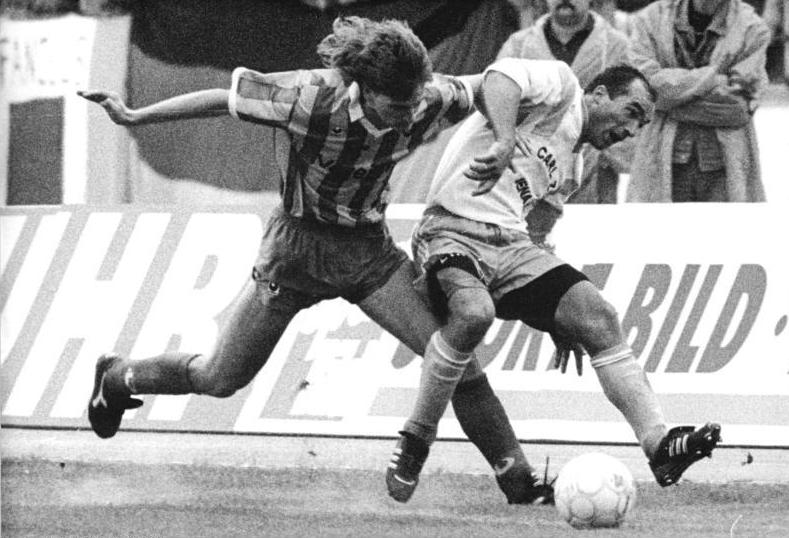
- Munever Krajišnik (right) with Frank Edmond (left) during a football match in 1990

Personal information
- Full name: Munever Krajišnik
- Date of birth: November 5, 1962 (age 63)
- Place of birth: Dobošnica, SFR Yugoslavia
- Position: Forward

Senior career*
Years	Team	Apps	(Gls)
1984–1988	Sloboda Tuzla	48	(10)
1988–1989	Westerlo		
1989–1990	Lokeren		
1990–1991	Carl Zeiss Jena	21	(2)
1991–1992	Lokeren		
1992–1994	Westerlo		

Managerial career
- 2009–2012: Slaven Živinice
- 2018: Slaven Živinice
- * Club domestic league appearances and goals

Munever Krajišnik (born 5 November 1962 in Dobošnica) is a former Yugoslav football player, from the 1980s and football coach.

== Club career ==
Krajišnik played for several clubs in Yugoslavia, Belgium and East Germany.
