= Sižje =

- Village
- Location within Bosnia and Herzegovina
- Coordinates: 44°34′N 18°26′E
- Country: Bosnia and Herzegovina
- Entity: Federation of Bosnia and Herzegovina
- Canton: Tuzla
- Municipality: Lukavac

Area
  - Total: 3.43 sq mi (8.88 km^{2})

Population (2013)
  - Total: 314
  - Density: 91.6/sq mi (35.4/km^{2})

Sižje is a village in the municipality of Lukavac, Bosnia and Herzegovina.

== Demographics ==
According to the 2013 census, its population was 314.

Ethnicity in 2013
Ethnicity	Number	Percentage
Serbs	242	77.1%
Bosniaks	68	21.7%
Croats	1	0.3%
other/undeclared	3	1.0%
Total	314	100%
