= Prline =

- Village
- Location within Bosnia and Herzegovina
- Coordinates: 44°34′26″N 18°29′06″E
- Country: Bosnia and Herzegovina
- Entity: Federation of Bosnia and Herzegovina
- Canton: Tuzla
- Municipality: Lukavac

Area
  - Total: 1.29 sq mi (3.35 km^{2})

Population (2013)
  - Total: 90
  - Density: 70/sq mi (27/km^{2})

Prline is a village in the municipality of Lukavac, Bosnia and Herzegovina.

== Demographics ==
According to the 2013 census, its population was 90.

Ethnicity in 2013
Ethnicity	Number	Percentage
Bosniaks	81	90.0%
other/undeclared	9	10.0%
Total	90	100%
