= Bokavići =

- Village
- Location within Bosnia and Herzegovina
- Coordinates: 44°30′N 18°32′E
- Country: Bosnia and Herzegovina
- Entity: Federation of Bosnia and Herzegovina
- Canton: Tuzla
- Municipality: Lukavac

Area
  - Total: 3.82 sq mi (9.89 km^{2})

Population (2013)
  - Total: 1,290
  - Density: 338/sq mi (130/km^{2})

Bokavići is a village in the municipality of Lukavac, Bosnia and Herzegovina.

== Demographics ==
According to the 2013 census, its population was 1,290.

Ethnicity in 2013
Ethnicity	Number	Percentage
Bosniaks	1,260	97.7%
Croats	3	0.2%
Serbs	2	0.2%
other/undeclared	25	1.9%
Total	1,290	100%
