= Semići =

- Village
- Location within Bosnia and Herzegovina
- Coordinates: 44°29′51″N 18°24′45″E
- Country: Bosnia and Herzegovina
- Entity: Federation of Bosnia and Herzegovina
- Canton: Tuzla
- Municipality: Lukavac

Area
  - Total: 0.73 sq mi (1.88 km^{2})

Population (2013)
  - Total: 160
  - Density: 220/sq mi (85/km^{2})

Semići is a village in the municipality of Lukavac, Bosnia and Herzegovina.

== Demographics ==
According to the 2013 census, its population was 160.

Ethnicity in 2013
Ethnicity	Number	Percentage
Bosniaks	149	93.1%
other/undeclared	11	6.9%
Total	160	100%
