= Caparde (Lukavac) =

- Village
- Location within Bosnia and Herzegovina
- Coordinates: 44°31′34″N 18°27′16″E
- Country: Bosnia and Herzegovina
- Entity: Federation of Bosnia and Herzegovina
- Canton: Tuzla
- Municipality: Lukavac

Area
  - Total: 2.46 sq mi (6.38 km^{2})

Population (2013)
  - Total: 1,289
  - Density: 523/sq mi (202/km^{2})

Caparde is a village in the municipality of Lukavac, Bosnia and Herzegovina.

== Demographics ==
According to the 2013 census, its population was 230.

Ethnicity in 2013
Ethnicity	Number	Percentage
Bosniaks	1,232	95.6%
other/undeclared	57	4.4%
Total	1,289	100%
