= Šantići =

- Village
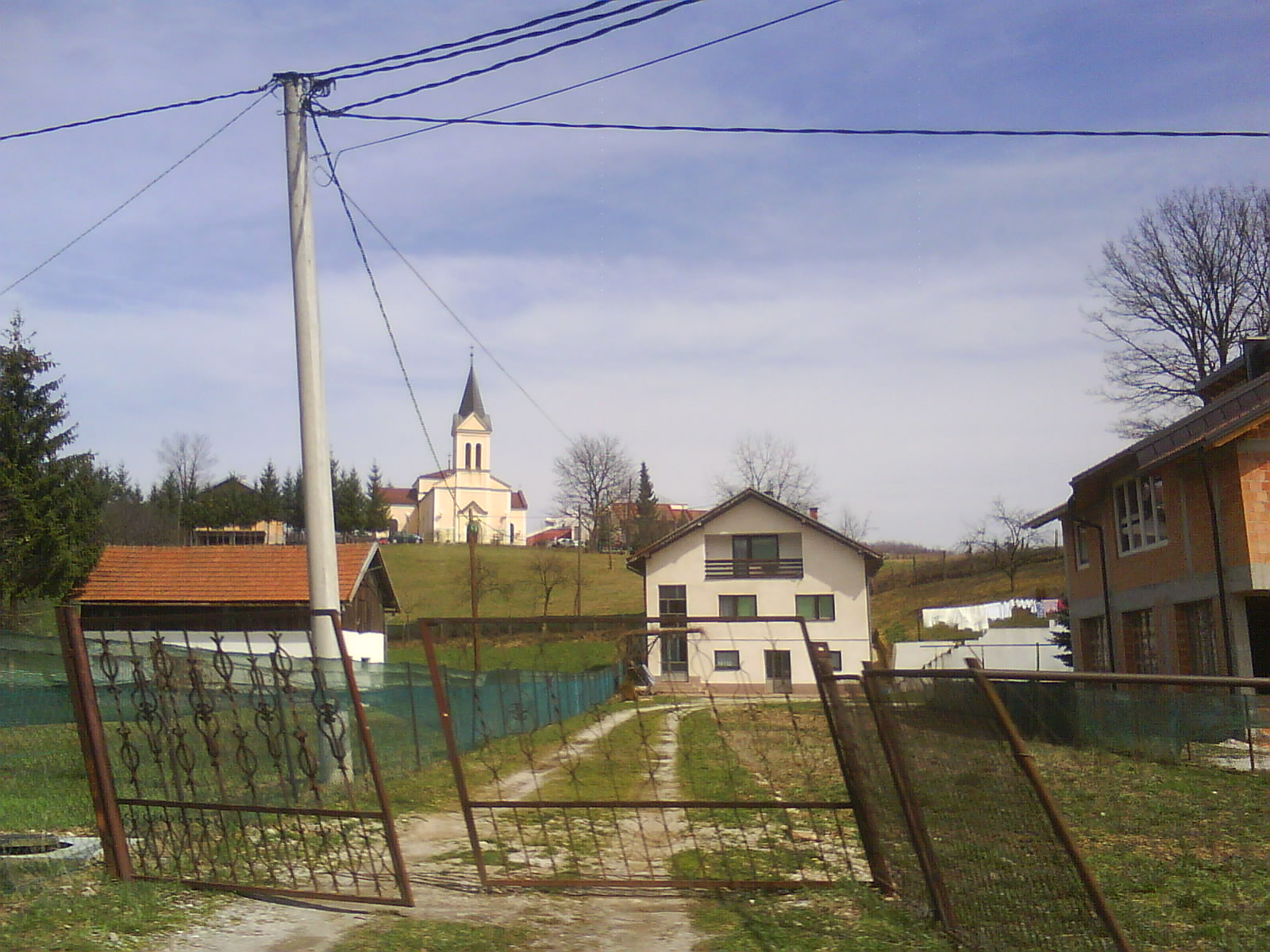

- Location within Bosnia and Herzegovina
- Coordinates: 44.1461541°N 17.8203883°E
- Country: Bosnia and Herzegovina
- Entity: Federation of Bosnia and Herzegovina
- Canton: Central Bosnia
- Municipality: Vitez

Area
  - Total: 0.73 sq mi (1.88 km^{2})

Population (2013)
  - Total: 823
  - Density: 1,130/sq mi (438/km^{2})
- Time zone: UTC+1 (CET)
  - Summer (DST): UTC+2 (CEST)

Šantići is a village in the municipality of Vitez, Bosnia and Herzegovina.

== Demographics ==
According to the 2013 census, its population was 823.

Ethnicity in 2013
Ethnicity	Number	Percentage
Croats	767	82.1%
Bosniaks	132	16.0%
Serbs	7	0.9%
other/undeclared	8	1.0%
Total	823	100%
