= Donje Moštre =

- Village
- Location within Bosnia and Herzegovina
- Coordinates: 44.0268304°N 18.1310382°E
- Country: Bosnia and Herzegovina
- Entity: Federation of Bosnia and Herzegovina
- Canton: Zenica-Doboj
- Municipality: Visoko

Area
  - Total: 0.33 sq mi (0.85 km^{2})

Population (2013)
  - Total: 695
  - Density: 2,100/sq mi (820/km^{2})
- Time zone: UTC+1 (CET)
  - Summer (DST): UTC+2 (CEST)

Donje Moštre is a village in the municipality of Visoko, Bosnia and Herzegovina. It is located on the western banks of the River Bosna.

== Demographics ==
According to the 2013 census, its population was 695.

Ethnicity in 2013
| Ethnicity | Number | Percentage |
|---|---|---|
| Bosniaks | 672 | 96.7% |
| Croats | 2 | 0.3% |
| other/undeclared | 21 | 3.0% |
| Total | 695 | 100% |
