= Babice Gornje =

- Village
- Location within Bosnia and Herzegovina
- Coordinates: 44°28′37″N 18°25′24″E
- Country: Bosnia and Herzegovina
- Entity: Federation of Bosnia and Herzegovina
- Canton: Tuzla
- Municipality: Lukavac

Area
  - Total: 3.26 sq mi (8.45 km^{2})

Population (2013)
  - Total: 400
  - Density: 120/sq mi (47/km^{2})

Babice Gornje is a village in the municipality of Lukavac, Bosnia and Herzegovina.

== Demographics ==
According to the 2013 census, its population was 400.

Ethnicity in 2013
Ethnicity	Number	Percentage
Bosniaks	387	96.8%
other/undeclared	13	3.3%
Total	400	100%
