= Topuzovo Polje =

- Village
- Location within Bosnia and Herzegovina
- Coordinates: 44.0064489°N 18.1543473°E
- Country: Bosnia and Herzegovina
- Entity: Federation of Bosnia and Herzegovina
- Canton: Zenica-Doboj
- Municipality: Visoko

Area
  - Total: 0.32 sq mi (0.82 km^{2})

Population (2013)
  - Total: 306
  - Density: 970/sq mi (370/km^{2})
- Time zone: UTC+1 (CET)
  - Summer (DST): UTC+2 (CEST)

Topuzovo Polje is a village in the municipality of Visoko, Bosnia and Herzegovina. It is located on the western banks of the River Bosna.

== Demographics ==
According to the 2013 census, its population was 306.

Ethnicity in 2013
Ethnicity	Number	Percentage
Bosniaks	278	90.8%
Serbs	7	2.3%
other/undeclared	21	6.9%
Total	306	100%
