= Čović Polje =

Village in Bosnia and Herzegovina

- Village
- Location within Bosnia and Herzegovina
- Coordinates: 44.978577°N 18.6322117°E
- Country: Bosnia and Herzegovina
- Entity: Federation of Bosnia and Herzegovina; Republika Srpska
- Canton Region: Posavina; Doboj
- Municipality: Orašje; Donji Žabar

Area
  - Total: 4.32 sq mi (11.20 km^{2})

Population (2013)
  - Total: 642
  - Density: 148/sq mi (57.3/km^{2})
- Time zone: UTC+1 (CET)
  - Summer (DST): UTC+2 (CEST)

Čović Polje is a village in the municipalities of Orašje (Federation of Bosnia and Herzegovina) and Donji Žabar (Republika Srpska), Bosnia and Herzegovina.

== Demographics ==
According to the 2013 census, its population was 642, all living in the Donji Žabar part, thus none in the Orašje part.

Ethnicity in 2013
Ethnicity	Number	Percentage
Serbs	634	98.8%
Croats	5	0.8%
other/undeclared	3	0.5%
Total	642	100%
