= Gavro Vučković Krajišnik =

Serb representative in Constantinople, trader and writer

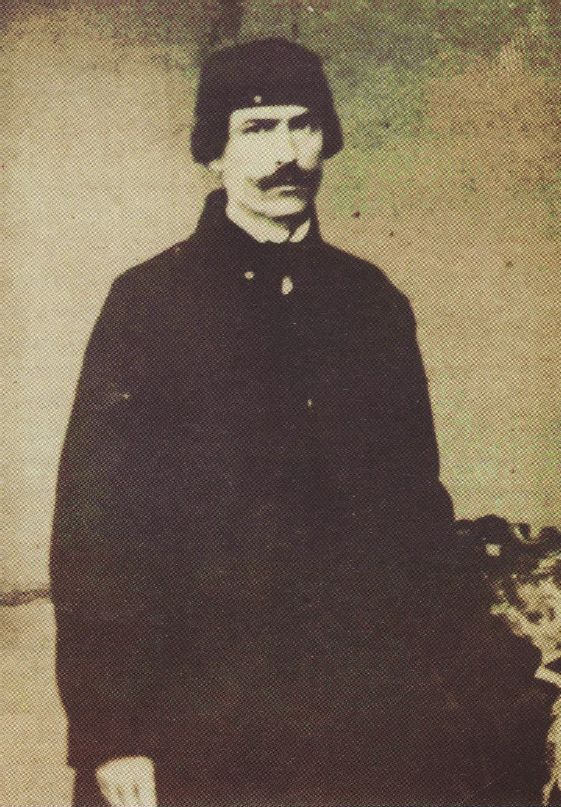
- Portrait of Gavro Vučković Krajišnik (1826—1876)
- Born: Sanski Most, Ottoman Empire
- Died: Belgrade, Principality of Serbia
- Occupations: trader, politician, writer

Gavro Vučković Krajišnik (born in Donji Dabar near Sanski Most 1826 — Belgrade, 1876) was a Bosnian Serb politician, trader and writer.

== Biography ==
He came from a well-off Bosnian Serb family with a history in dealing with trade of goods. Gavro Vučković traveled around Europe to do business and became fluent in German, French, Greek, Italian, Turkish and later the Arabic language. Vučković represented all Orthodox Christians from Bosnia and Herzegovina in Constantinople. He used this position to further the agenda of the Serbs of Bosnia and Herzegovina, made contributions to education, improved road infrastructure and helped in the restoration of monasteries, including the Rmanj Monastery.

Vučković died on his way to Bosnia from Belgrade in order to join the Herzegovina uprising (1875-1877).

His cousin Konstantin Vučković was one of the richest traders and bankers of his time, active in Dalmatia where he founded Matica Srpska in Dubrovnik.

== Works ==
- Riječ krajišnička, 1868
- Robstvo u slobodi ili ogledalo pravde u Bosni, 1872
- Crno putovanje za Carigrad, 1910
