= Pridjel Donji =

Pridjel Donji Придјел Доњи
- Village
- Location within Bosnia and Herzegovina
- Coordinates: 44°42′04″N 18°05′20″E
- Country: Bosnia and Herzegovina
- Entity: Republika Srpska
- Municipality: Doboj
- Time zone: UTC+1 (CET)
  - Summer (DST): UTC+2 (CEST)

Pridjel Donji (Cyrillic: Придјел Доњи) is a village in the municipality of Doboj, Republika Srpska, Bosnia and Herzegovina.
