= Kralje =

Kralje Краље
- Village
- Location within Montenegro
- Coordinates: 42.735658°N 19.755703°E
- Country: Montenegro
- Municipality: Andrijevica

Population (2023)
  - Total: 168
- Time zone: UTC+1 (CET)
  - Summer (DST): UTC+2 (CEST)

Kralje (Serbian Cyrillic: Краље) is a village in the municipality of Andrijevica, Montenegro.

== Demographics ==
According to the 2023 census, it had a population of 168 people.

Ethnicity in 2011
Ethnicity	Number	Percentage
Serbs	110	53.7%
Montenegrins	90	43.9%
other/undeclared	5	2.4%
Total	205	100%
