= Poljice, Lukavac =

Poljice
- Village
- Location within Bosnia and Herzegovina
- Coordinates: 44°28′41″N 18°28′52″E
- Country: Bosnia and Herzegovina
- Entity: Federation of Bosnia and Herzegovina
- Canton: Tuzla
- City: Lukavac

Area
  - Total: 10.61 sq mi (27.48 km^{2})

Population (2013)
  - Total: 4,337
  - Density: 408.8/sq mi (157.8/km^{2})

Poljice is a village in the city of Lukavac, Bosnia and Herzegovina. It is located on the south shore of Modrac Lake.

== Demographics ==
According to the 2013 census, its population was 4,337.

Ethnicity in 2013
Ethnicity	Number	Percentage
Bosniaks	4,160	95.9%
Croats	4	0.1%
Serbs	3	0.1%
other/undeclared	170	3.9%
Total	4,337	100%
