= Brijesnica Gornja =

- Village
- Location within Bosnia and Herzegovina
- Coordinates: 44°29′33″N 18°20′17″E
- Country: Bosnia and Herzegovina
- Entity: Federation of Bosnia and Herzegovina
- Canton: Tuzla
- Municipality: Lukavac

Area
  - Total: 7.03 sq mi (18.22 km^{2})

Population (2013)
  - Total: 0
  - Density: 0.0/sq mi (0.0/km^{2})

Brijesnica Gornja is a village in the municipality of Lukavac, Bosnia and Herzegovina.

== Demographics ==
According to the 2013 census, its population was 0, down from 571 in 1991.
