= Grđevac =

- Village
- Location within Bosnia and Herzegovina
- Coordinates: 44.0497406°N 18.1424484°E
- Country: Bosnia and Herzegovina
- Entity: Federation of Bosnia and Herzegovina
- Canton: Zenica-Doboj
- Municipality: Visoko

Area
  - Total: 1.36 sq mi (3.51 km^{2})

Population (2013)
  - Total: 444
  - Density: 328/sq mi (126/km^{2})
- Time zone: UTC+1 (CET)
  - Summer (DST): UTC+2 (CEST)

Grđevac is a village in the municipality of Visoko, Bosnia and Herzegovina.

== Demographics ==
According to the 2013 census, its population was 444.

Ethnicity in 2013
Ethnicity	Number	Percentage
Bosniaks	437	98.4%
Serbs	2	0.5%
other/undeclared	5	1.1%
Total	444	100%
