= Spreča =

- Location within Bosnia and Herzegovina

Location
- Country: Bosnia and Herzegovina

Physical characteristics
- Source
  - coordinates: 44°21′09″N 19°01′16″E
- Mouth: Bosna
  - location: Doboj
  - coordinates: 44°44′03″N 18°06′05″E
- Length: 138.8 km (86.2 mi)
- Basin size: 1,948 km^{2} (752 sq mi)

Basin features
- Progression: Bosna→ Sava→ Danube→ Black Sea

The Spreča (Serbian Cyrillic: Спреча) is a river of northeastern Bosnia and Herzegovina, a tributary of the Bosna. Its source is located in the village of Snagovo in Zvornik municipality, and it reaches the Bosna at the city of Doboj. A damming of the Spreča in the municipality of Lukavac forms Modrac Lake. The 138.8-kilometre-long (86.2 mi) river also flows through the town of Gračanica.
