= Bašigovci =

- Village
- Location within Bosnia and Herzegovina
- Coordinates: 44.4162°N 18.6615°E
- Country: Bosnia and Herzegovina
- Entity: Federation of Bosnia and Herzegovina
- Canton: Tuzla
- Municipality: Živinice

Area
  - Total: 3.17 sq mi (8.22 km^{2})

Population (2013)
  - Total: 2,499
  - Density: 787/sq mi (304/km^{2})
- Time zone: UTC+1 (CET)
  - Summer (DST): UTC+2 (CEST)

Bašigovci is a village in the municipality of Živinice, Bosnia and Herzegovina.

== Demographics ==
According to the 2013 census, its population was 2,499.

Ethnicity in 2013
Ethnicity	Number	Percentage
Bosniaks	2,453	98.2%
Croats	1	0.0%
Serbs	1	0.0%
other/undeclared	44	1.8%
Total	2,499	100%
