= Kreshnik =

Kreshnik is an Albanian name.

Given name

- Kreshnik Bahtiri (born 1992), Kosovan footballer
- Kreshnik Çipi (born 1958), Albanian politician
- Kreshnik Gjata (born 1983), Albanian swimmer
- Kreshnik Hajrizi (born 1999), Kosovan footballer
- Kreshnik Ivanaj (born 1982), Albanian football player
- Kreshnik Krasniqi (born 2000), Kosovan-Norwegian footballer
- Kreshnik Qato (born 1978), Albanian boxer
- Kreshnik Bocolli (born 1986), Kosovar Enterpreneur
- Kreshnik Spahiu (born 1969), Albanian lawyer and politician
- Kreshnik Fazliu, known as MC Kresha (born 1984), Kosovar rapper
- Nik Xhelilaj (born Kreshnik Xhelilaj in 1983), Albanian film and stage actor

Surname

- Rustemi Kreshnik (born 1984), Albanian-Belgian kickboxer

Literature

- The heroes of the Kângë Kreshnikësh, a tradition of orally-transmitted myths

== See also ==
- Krajišnik (surname)
