= Cerik, Tuzla =

Village in Bosnia and Herzegovina

Cerik
- Village
- Location within Bosnia and Herzegovina
- Coordinates: 44.5065°N 18.5896°E
- Country: Bosnia and Herzegovina
- Entity: Federation of Bosnia and Herzegovina
- Canton: Tuzla
- Municipality: Tuzla

Area
  - Total: 0.28 sq mi (0.72 km^{2})

Population (2013)
  - Total: 280
  - Density: 1,000/sq mi (390/km^{2})
- Time zone: UTC+1 (CET)
  - Summer (DST): UTC+2 (CEST)

Cerik is a village in the municipality of Tuzla, Tuzla Canton, Bosnia and Herzegovina.

== Demographics ==
According to the 2013 census, its population was 280.

Ethnicity in 2013
Ethnicity	Number	Percentage
Bosniaks	212	75.7%
Croats	54	19.3%
Serbs	2	0.7%
other/undeclared	12	4.3%
Total	280	100%
