= Bikodže =

- Village
- Location within Bosnia and Herzegovina
- Coordinates: 44°31′N 18°29′E
- Country: Bosnia and Herzegovina
- Entity: Federation of Bosnia and Herzegovina
- Canton: Tuzla
- Municipality: Lukavac

Area
  - Total: 1.22 sq mi (3.16 km^{2})

Population (2013)
  - Total: 970
  - Density: 800/sq mi (310/km^{2})

Bikodže is a village in the municipality of Lukavac, Bosnia and Herzegovina.

== Demographics ==
According to the 2013 census, its population was 970.

Ethnicity in 2013
Ethnicity	Number	Percentage
Bosniaks	940	96.9%
Croats	1	0.1%
other/undeclared	29	3.0%
Total	970	100%
