= Klokotnica (Doboj Istok) =

Klokotnica Клокотница
- Village
- Location within Bosnia and Herzegovina
- Coordinates: 44°44′0″N 18°11′20″E
- Country: Bosnia and Herzegovina
- Entity: Federation of Bosnia and Herzegovina
- Canton: Tuzla
- Municipality: Doboj Istok

Area
  - Total: 5.15 sq mi (13.35 km^{2})
- Elevation: 771 ft (235 m)

Population (2013)
  - Total: 4,874
  - Density: 945.6/sq mi (365.1/km^{2})
- Time zone: UTC+1 (CET)
  - Summer (DST): UTC+2 (CEST)

Klokotnica (Cyrillic: Клокотница) is a village in the municipality of Doboj Istok, Bosnia and Herzegovina. Klokotnica is administrative centre of Doboj Istok.

== Demographics ==
According to the 2013 census, its population was 4,874.

Ethnicity in 2013
Ethnicity	Number	Percentage
Bosniaks	4,526	92.9%
Croats	15	0.3%
Serbs	10	0.2%
other/undeclared	323	6.6%
Total	4,874	100%
