= Bukinje =

- Village
- Location within Bosnia and Herzegovina
- Coordinates: 44°31′36″N 18°36′14″E
- Country: Bosnia and Herzegovina
- Entity: Federation of Bosnia and Herzegovina
- Canton: Tuzla
- Municipality: Tuzla

Area
  - Total: 0.33 sq mi (0.86 km^{2})

Population (2013)
  - Total: 605
  - Density: 1,800/sq mi (700/km^{2})
- Time zone: UTC+1 (CET)
  - Summer (DST): UTC+2 (CEST)

Bukinje is a village in the municipality of Tuzla, Tuzla Canton, Bosnia and Herzegovina.

== Demographics ==
According to the 2013 census, its population was 605.

Ethnicity in 2013
Ethnicity	Number	Percentage
Bosniaks	258	42.6%
Croats	252	41.7%
Serbs	16	2.6%
other/undeclared	79	13.1%
Total	605	100%
