= Poriječani =

- Village
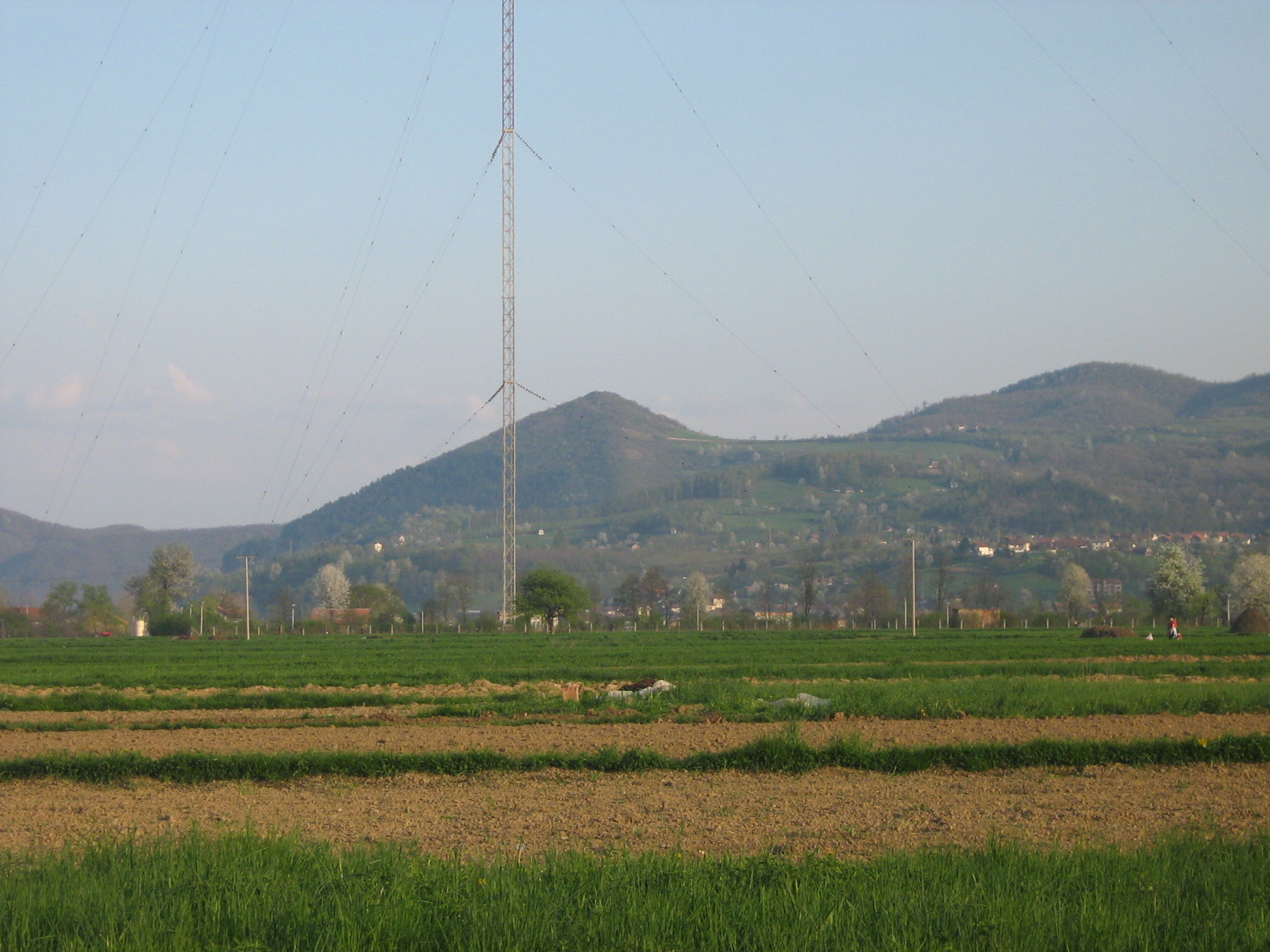

- Location within Bosnia and Herzegovina
- Coordinates: 44.0445571°N 18.1610154°E
- Country: Bosnia and Herzegovina
- Entity: Federation of Bosnia and Herzegovina
- Canton: Zenica-Doboj
- Municipality: Visoko

Area
  - Total: 0.74 sq mi (1.91 km^{2})

Population (2013)
  - Total: 197
  - Density: 267/sq mi (103/km^{2})
- Time zone: UTC+1 (CET)
  - Summer (DST): UTC+2 (CEST)

Poriječani is a village in the municipality of Visoko, Bosnia and Herzegovina.

== Demographics ==
According to the 2013 census, its population was 197.

Ethnicity in 2013
Ethnicity	Number	Percentage
Bosniaks	196	99.5%
other/undeclared	1	0.5%
Total	197	100%
