= Brijesnica Mala =

Brijesnica Mala Бријесница Мала
- Village
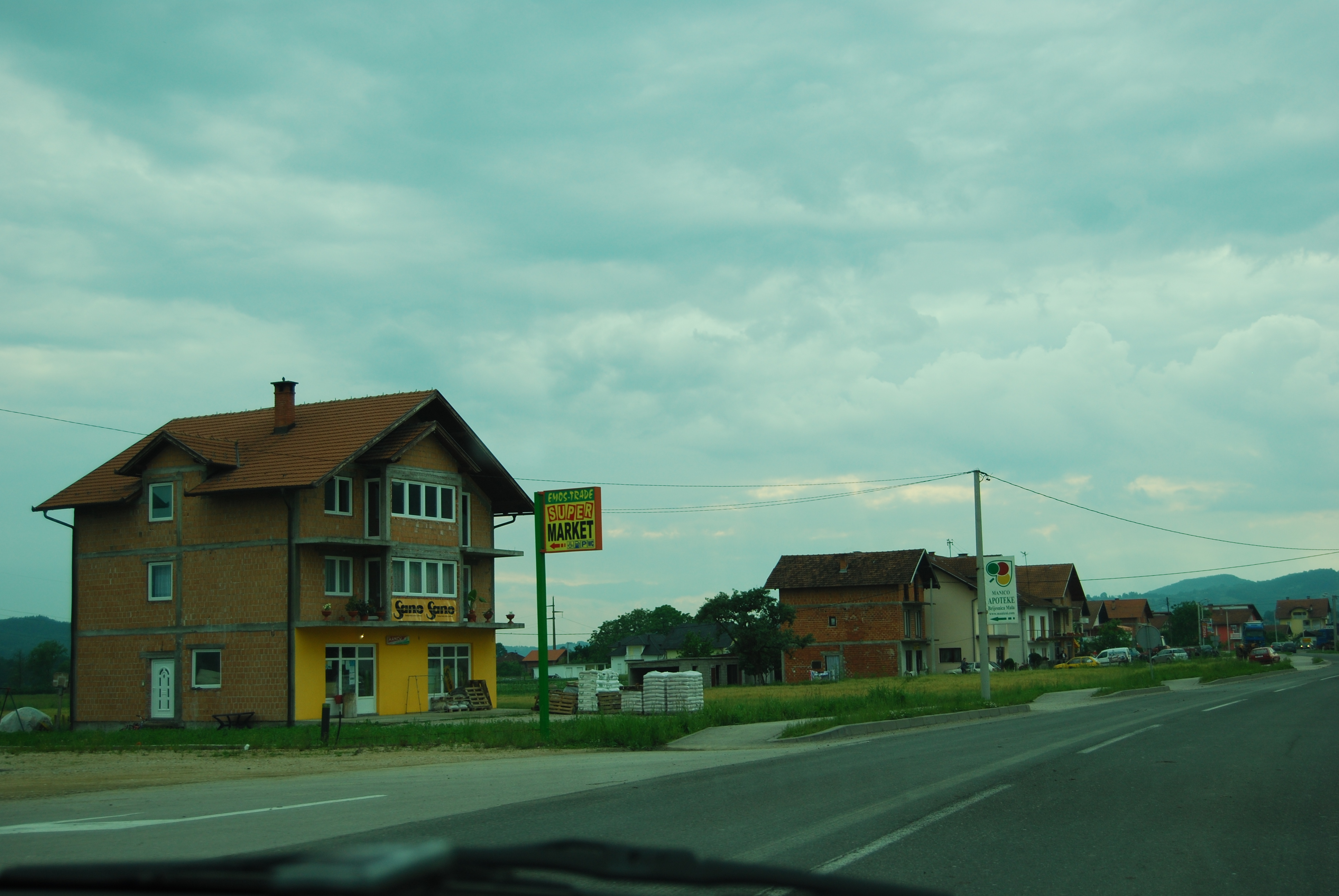

- Location within Bosnia and Herzegovina
- Coordinates: 44°43′48″N 18°13′34″E
- Country: Bosnia and Herzegovina
- Entity: Federation of Bosnia and Herzegovina
- Canton: Tuzla
- Municipality: Doboj Istok

Area
  - Total: 3.49 sq mi (9.04 km^{2})

Population (2013)
  - Total: 1,764
  - Density: 505/sq mi (195/km^{2})
- Time zone: UTC+1 (CET)
  - Summer (DST): UTC+2 (CEST)

Brijesnica Mala (Cyrillic: Бријесница Мала) is a village in the municipality of Doboj East, Bosnia and Herzegovina.

== Demographics ==
According to the 2013 census, its population was 1,764.

Ethnicity in 2013
Ethnicity	Number	Percentage
Bosniaks	1,760	98.5%
other/undeclared	4	1.3%
Total	1,764	100%
