= Turija, Bihać =

Turija
- Village
- Location within Bosnia and Herzegovina
- Coordinates: 44.882482°N 15.830658°E
- Country: Bosnia and Herzegovina
- Entity: Federation of Bosnia and Herzegovina
- Canton: Una-Sana
- Municipality: Bihać

Area
  - Total: 2.89 sq mi (7.49 km^{2})

Population (2013)
  - Total: 1,136
  - Density: 393/sq mi (152/km^{2})
- Time zone: UTC+1 (CET)
  - Summer (DST): UTC+2 (CEST)

Turija is a village in the municipality of Bihać, Bosnia and Herzegovina.

== Demographics ==
According to the 2013 census, its population was 1,136.

Ethnicity in 2013
Ethnicity	Number	Percentage
Bosniaks	1,127	99.2%
Croats	1	0.1%
other/undeclared	8	0.7%
Total	1,136	100%
