= Cerik (Lukavac) =

- Village
- Location within Bosnia and Herzegovina
- Coordinates: 44°30′41″N 18°24′27″E
- Country: Bosnia and Herzegovina
- Entity: Federation of Bosnia and Herzegovina
- Canton: Tuzla
- Municipality: Lukavac

Area
  - Total: 0.76 sq mi (1.98 km^{2})

Population (2013)
  - Total: 230
  - Density: 300/sq mi (120/km^{2})

Cerik is a village in the municipality of Lukavac, Bosnia and Herzegovina.

== Demographics ==
According to the 2013 census, its population was 230.

Ethnicity in 2013
Ethnicity	Number	Percentage
Bosniaks	225	97.8%
Serbs	2	0.9%
other/undeclared	3	1.3%
Total	230	100%
