= Mošćanica, Zenica =

Mošćanica
- Village
- Interactive map of Mošćanica
- Location within Bosnia and Herzegovina
- Coordinates: 44.1668078°N 18.0156588°E
- Country: Bosnia and Herzegovina
- Entity: Federation of Bosnia and Herzegovina
- Canton: Zenica-Doboj
- Municipality: Zenica

Area
  - Total: 3.14 sq mi (8.14 km^{2})

Population (2013)
  - Total: 614
  - Density: 195/sq mi (75.4/km^{2})
- Time zone: UTC+1 (CET)
  - Summer (DST): UTC+2 (CEST)

Mošćanica is a village in the City of Zenica, Bosnia and Herzegovina.

== Demographics ==
According to the 2013 census, its population was 614.

Ethnicity in 2013
Ethnicity	Number	Percentage
Bosniaks	613	99.8%
other/undeclared	1	0.2%
Total	614	100%
