= Huskići =

- Village
- Location within Bosnia and Herzegovina
- Country: Bosnia and Herzegovina
- Entity: Federation of Bosnia and Herzegovina
- Canton: Tuzla
- Municipality: Lukavac

Area
  - Total: 2.89 sq mi (7.49 km^{2})

Population (2013)
  - Total: 1,334
  - Density: 461/sq mi (178/km^{2})

Huskići is a village in the municipality of Lukavac, Bosnia and Herzegovina.

== Demographics ==
According to the 2013 census, its population was 1,334.

Ethnicity in 2013
Ethnicity	Number	Percentage
Bosniaks	1,230	92.2%
Croats	3	0.2%
Serbs	4	0.3%
other/undeclared	97	7.3%
Total	1,334	100%
