= NK Junak Srđevići =

HNK Junak Srđevići
- Full name: Hrvatski nogometni klub Junak Srđevići
- Founded: 1972
- Ground: Igralište u Srđevićima
- League: County League HBŽ-ZHŽ

NK Junak Srđevići is a Croatian football club from Srđevići near Livno.

== History ==
HNK Junak was founded in 1972. The club has both senior and veteran teams. In 2013, HNK Junak was the champion of the Intr-County League, which enabled them to compete in the Second League of FBiH – South. However, before the start of the season, they withdrew from the competition.

== Season ranking overview ==
| Season | Rank | League | Position | Sources |
|---|---|---|---|---|
| 2017/18 | IV. | Međužupanijska liga HBŽ i ZHŽ | 3rd | |
| 2018/19 | IV. | Međužupanijska liga HBŽ i ZHŽ | 3rd | |
| 2019/20 | IV. | Međužupanijska liga HBŽ i ZHŽ | 4th | |
| 2020/21 | IV. | Međužupanijska liga HBŽ i ZHŽ | 3rd | |
| 2021/22 | IV. | Međužupanijska liga HBŽ i ZHŽ | 4th | |
| 2022/23 | IV. | Međužupanijska liga HBŽ i ZHŽ | 1st | |
| 2023/24 | IV. | Međužupanijska liga HBŽ i ZHŽ | 2nd | |
| 2024/25 | IV. | Međužupanijska liga HBŽ i ZHŽ | – | |
