= Tišina, Šamac =

Tišina Тишина (Serbian)
- Village (Selo)
- Location within Bosnia and Herzegovina
- Coordinates: 45°2′35″N 18°28′43″E
- Country: Bosnia and Herzegovina
- Entity: Federation of Bosnia and Herzegovina; Republika Srpska
- Canton Region: Posavina; Doboj
- Municipality: Domaljevac-Šamac; Šamac

Area
  - Total: 4.39 sq mi (11.38 km^{2})

Population (2013)
  - Total: 955
  - Density: 217/sq mi (83.9/km^{2})
- Time zone: UTC+1 (CET)
  - Summer (DST): UTC+2 (CEST)

Tišina (Cyrillic: Тишина) is a village in the municipalities of Domaljevac-Šamac, Posavina Canton and Šamac, Republika Srpska, Bosnia and Herzegovina.

== Demographics ==
According to the 2013 census, its population was 955, with 915 living in the Šamac part and 40 in the Domaljevac-Šamac part.

Ethnicity in 2013
| Ethnicity | Number | Percentage |
|---|---|---|
| Serbs | 788 | 82.5% |
| Croats | 157 | 16.4% |
| Bosniaks | 2 | 0.2% |
| other/undeclared | 8 | 0.8% |
| Total | 955 | 100% |
