= Amajlije =

Amajlije Амајлије (Serbian)
- Village (Selo)
- Location within Bosnia and Herzegovina
- Coordinates: 44°44′29.70″N 19°16′30.60″E
- Country: Bosnia and Herzegovina
- Entity: Republika Srpska
- City: Bijeljina
- Time zone: UTC+1 (CET)
  - Summer (DST): UTC+2 (CEST)

Amajlije (Serbian Cyrillic: Амајлије) is a place located east of the city of Bijeljina in Republika Srpska, Bosnia and Herzegovina. Its population in 1991 was 1,110.

The name "Amajlije" means "amulets".

== Demographics ==
According to the 2013 census, its population was 1,131.

Ethnicity in 2013
Ethnicity	Number	Percentage
Bosniaks	1	0.08%
Serbs	1,098	97.08%
Croats	4	0.03%
other/undeclared	28	2.47%
Total	1,131	100%

== Sport ==
The main football club is FK Drina Amajlije.
