= Crveno Brdo (Lukavac) =

- Village
- Location within Bosnia and Herzegovina
- Coordinates: 44°34′02″N 18°31′05″E
- Country: Bosnia and Herzegovina
- Entity: Federation of Bosnia and Herzegovina
- Canton: Tuzla
- Municipality: Lukavac

Area
  - Total: 1.37 sq mi (3.56 km^{2})

Population (2013)
  - Total: 1,273
  - Density: 926/sq mi (358/km^{2})

Crveno Brdo is a village in the municipality of Lukavac, Bosnia and Herzegovina.

== Demographics ==
According to the 2013 census, its population was 1,273.

Ethnicity in 2013
Ethnicity	Number	Percentage
Bosniaks	1,173	92.1%
Croats	15	1.2%
Serbs	8	0.6%
other/undeclared	77	6.0%
Total	1,273	100%
