= Modrac Lake =

- Jezero Modrac (Bosnian)
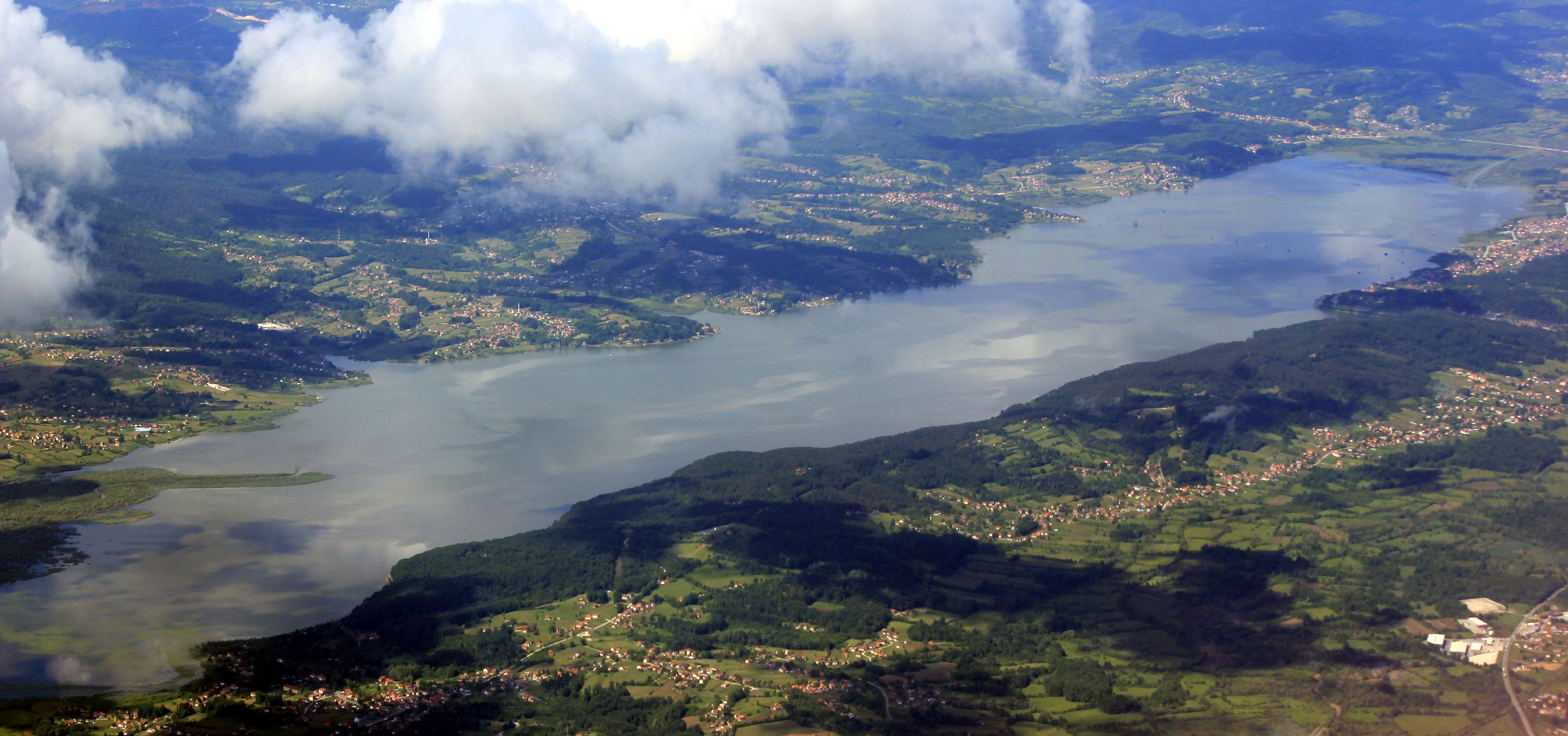
- Aerial image of the lake

- Location within Bosnia and Herzegovina
- Interactive map of Modrac Lake
- Location: Bosnia and Herzegovina
- Coordinates: 44°29′55″N 18°30′0″E
- Type: artificial lake
- Settlements: Modrac, Lukavac, Poljice, Prokosovići

Modrac Lake (Bosnian: Jezero Modrac) is an artificial lake in Bosnia and Herzegovina. Located in the municipality of Lukavac, it is home to many species of fish and is popular with fishermen.

A 2005 effort to turn it into a tourist attraction was unsuccessful because of local government neglect and inhabitants' practice of dumping garbage on the shore. The resulting disease and bacteria made it undesirable for swimming. As a result, tourists lost interest in the lake.

A cable car for goods transport crosses Modrac Lake.

== Gallery ==
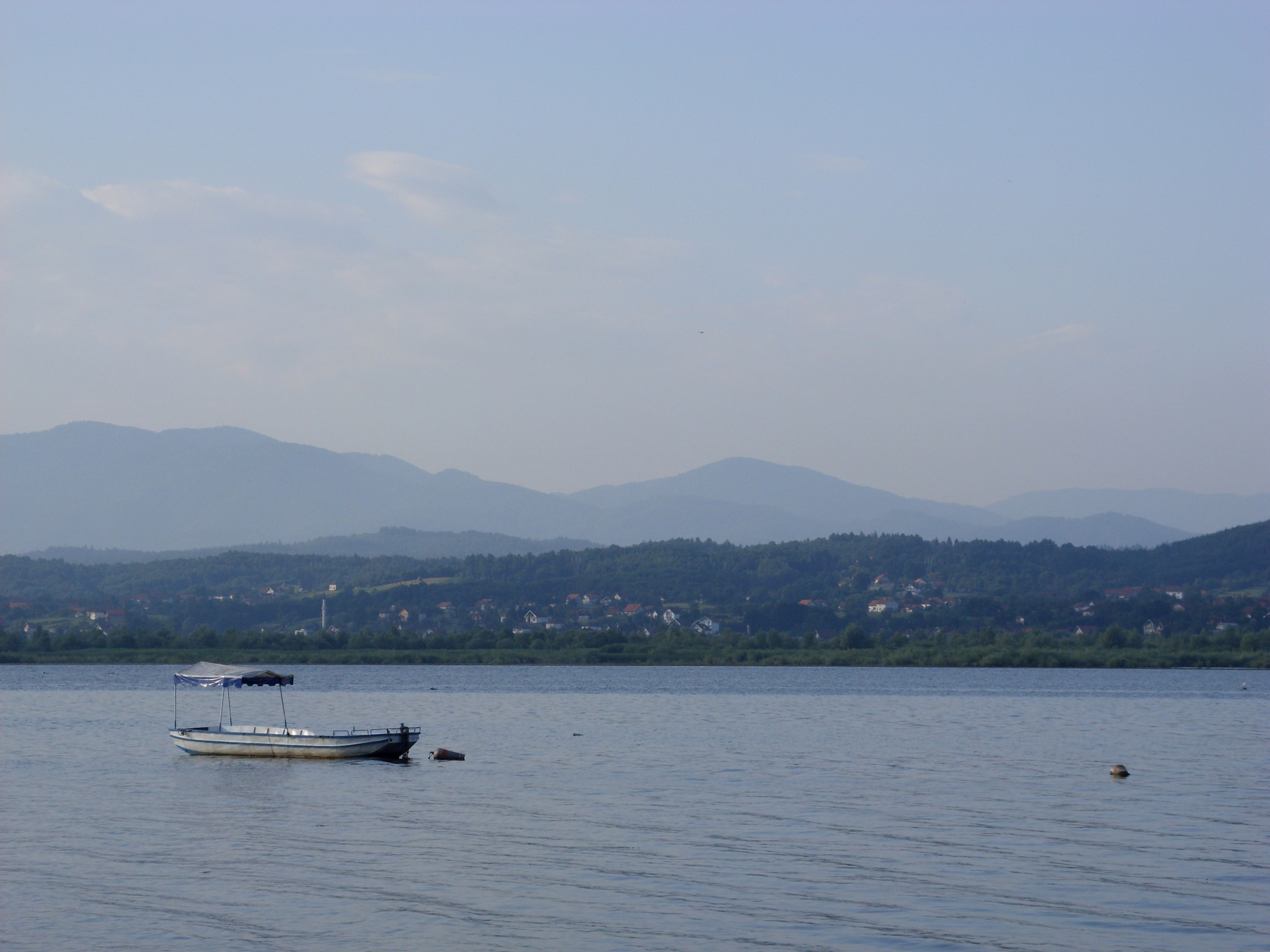
East side of Lake Modrac

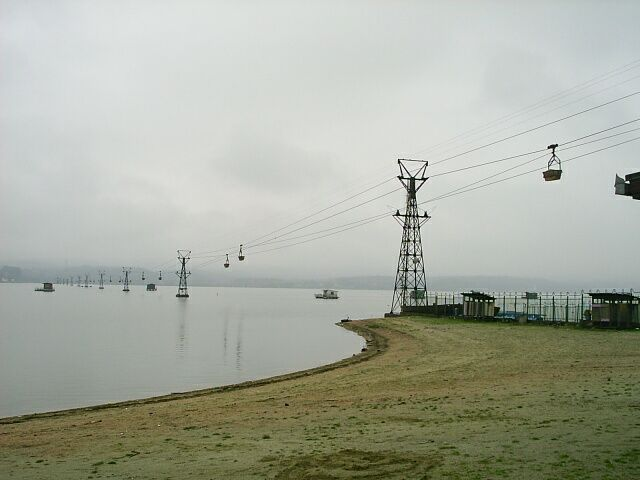
Cable car over Modrac Lake

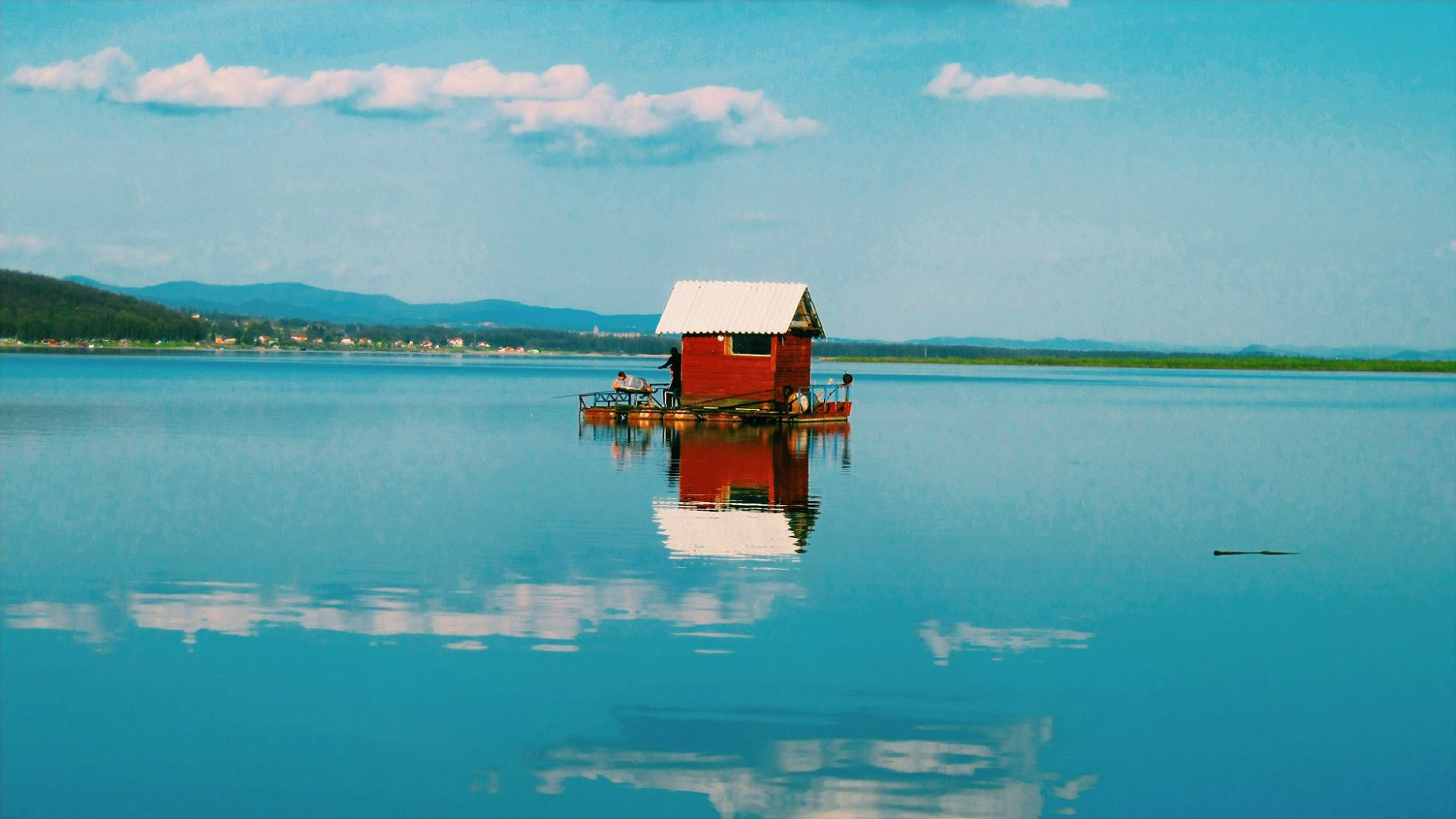
Modrac Lake

== See also ==
- List of lakes in Bosnia and Herzegovina
