= Liješeva =

- Village
- Location within Bosnia and Herzegovina
- Coordinates: 44.0128245°N 18.0771649°E
- Country: Bosnia and Herzegovina
- Entity: Federation of Bosnia and Herzegovina
- Canton: Zenica-Doboj
- Municipality: Visoko

Area
  - Total: 0.74 sq mi (1.92 km^{2})

Population (2013)
  - Total: 401
  - Density: 541/sq mi (209/km^{2})
- Time zone: UTC+1 (CET)
  - Summer (DST): UTC+2 (CEST)

Liješeva is a village in the municipality of Visoko, Bosnia and Herzegovina.

== Demographics ==
According to the 2013 census, its population was 401.

Ethnicity in 2013
Ethnicity	Number	Percentage
Bosniaks	400	99.8%
Croats	1	0.2%
Total	401	100%
