= Buzić Mahala =

- Village
- Location within Bosnia and Herzegovina
- Coordinates: 44.0365367°N 18.1121214°E
- Country: Bosnia and Herzegovina
- Entity: Federation of Bosnia and Herzegovina
- Canton: Zenica-Doboj
- Municipality: Visoko

Area
  - Total: 1.73 sq mi (4.49 km^{2})

Population (2013)
  - Total: 1,179
  - Density: 680/sq mi (263/km^{2})
- Time zone: UTC+1 (CET)
  - Summer (DST): UTC+2 (CEST)

Buzić Mahala is a village in the municipality of Visoko, Bosnia and Herzegovina. It is located on the western banks of the River Bosna.

== Demographics ==
According to the 2013 census, its population was 1,179.

Ethnicity in 2013
Ethnicity	Number	Percentage
Bosniaks	1,174	99.6%
Croats	2	0.2%
other/undeclared	3	0.3%
Total	1,179	100%
