= Kruševica (Lukavac) =

- Village
- Location within Bosnia and Herzegovina
- Coordinates: 44°37′17″N 18°28′07″E
- Country: Bosnia and Herzegovina
- Entity: Federation of Bosnia and Herzegovina
- Canton: Tuzla
- Municipality: Lukavac

Area
  - Total: 2.17 sq mi (5.63 km^{2})

Population (2013)
  - Total: 1,089
  - Density: 501/sq mi (193/km^{2})

Kruševica is a village in the municipality of Lukavac, Bosnia and Herzegovina.

== Demographics ==
According to the 2013 census, its population was 1,089.

Ethnicity in 2013
Ethnicity	Number	Percentage
Bosniaks	1,062	97.5%
Croats	3	0.3%
other/undeclared	24	2.2%
Total	1,089	100%
