= Brijesnica Donja =

- Village
- Location within Bosnia and Herzegovina
- Coordinates: 44°30′36″N 18°22′45″E
- Country: Bosnia and Herzegovina
- Entity: Federation of Bosnia and Herzegovina
- Canton: Tuzla
- Municipality: Lukavac

Area
  - Total: 6.45 sq mi (16.71 km^{2})

Population (2013)
  - Total: 80
  - Density: 12/sq mi (4.8/km^{2})

Brijesnica Donja is a village in the municipality of Lukavac, Bosnia and Herzegovina.

== Demographics ==
According to the 2013 census, its population was 80.

Ethnicity in 2013
Ethnicity	Number	Percentage
Serbs	73	91.3%
Bosniaks	4	5.0%
Croats	2	2.5%
other/undeclared	1	1.3%
Total	80	100%
