= Brijesnica Velika =

- Village
- Location within Bosnia and Herzegovina
- Coordinates: 44°43′47″N 18°12′34″E
- Country: Bosnia and Herzegovina
- Entity: Federation of Bosnia and Herzegovina
- Canton: Tuzla
- Municipality: Doboj Istok

Area
  - Total: 2.64 sq mi (6.83 km^{2})

Population (2013)
  - Total: 1,872
  - Density: 710/sq mi (274/km^{2})
- Time zone: UTC+1 (CET)
  - Summer (DST): UTC+2 (CEST)

Velika Brijesnica is a village in Bosnia and Herzegovina. It is part of the municipality of Doboj East, in the Federation of Bosnia and Herzegovina.

Before the Bosnian War it was part of the municipality of Doboj and had 1,771 resident in 1991. It is located on the Trebava mountain and it is bordered by the river Spreča and the mountain of Ozren.

== Demographics ==
According to the 2013 census, its population was 1,872.

Ethnicity in 2013
Ethnicity	Number	Percentage
Bosniaks	1,836	98.1%
Croats	3	0.2%
Serbs	2	0.1%
other/undeclared	31	1.7%
Total	1,872	100%
