= Kiseljak, Srebrenik =

Kiseljak
- Village
- Location within Bosnia and Herzegovina
- Coordinates: 44°38′32″N 18°28′20″E
- Country: Bosnia and Herzegovina
- Entity: Federation of Bosnia and Herzegovina
- Canton: Tuzla
- Municipality: Srebrenik

Area
  - Total: 0.16 sq mi (0.41 km^{2})

Population (2013)
  - Total: 903
  - Density: 5,700/sq mi (2,200/km^{2})

Kiseljak is a village in the municipality of Srebrenik, Bosnia and Herzegovina.

== Demographics ==
According to the 2013 census, its population was 903.

Ethnicity in 2013
| Ethnicity | Number | Percentage |
|---|---|---|
| Bosniaks | 835 | 92.5% |
| Serbs | 1 | 0.1% |
| other/undeclared | 67 | 7.4% |
| Total | 903 | 100% |
