= Bazik =

- Village
- Location within Bosnia and Herzegovina
- Coordinates: 45°03′N 18°33′E
- Country: Bosnia and Herzegovina
- Entity: Federation of Bosnia and Herzegovina
- Canton: Posavina
- Municipality: Domaljevac-Šamac

Area
  - Total: 0.90 sq mi (2.32 km^{2})

Population (2013)
  - Total: 493
  - Density: 550/sq mi (212/km^{2})
- Time zone: UTC+1 (CET)
  - Summer (DST): UTC+2 (CEST)

Bazik is a village in the municipality of Domaljevac-Šamac, Posavina Canton, Bosnia and Herzegovina.

== Demographics ==
According to the 2013 census, its population was 493.

Ethnicity in 2013
| Ethnicity | Number | Percentage |
|---|---|---|
| Croats | 485 | 98.4% |
| Serbs | 4 | 0.8% |
| Bosniaks | 2 | 0.4% |
| other/undeclared | 2 | 0.4% |
| Total | 493 | 100% |
