= Dobošnica =

Dobošnica Добошница
- Village
- Location within Bosnia and Herzegovina
- Coordinates: 44°35′N 18°28′E
- Country: Bosnia and Herzegovina
- Entity: Federation of Bosnia and Herzegovina
- Canton: Tuzla
- Municipality: Lukavac

Area
  - Total: 5.43 sq mi (14.06 km^{2})

Population (2013)
  - Total: 2,696
  - Density: 496.6/sq mi (191.7/km^{2})

Dobošnica (Cyrillic: Добошница) is a village in the municipality of Lukavac, Bosnia and Herzegovina.

== Demographics ==
According to the 2013 census, its population was 2,696.

Ethnicity in 2013
Ethnicity	Number	Percentage
Bosniaks	2,568	95.3%
Croats	3	0.1%
Serbs	3	0.1%
other/undeclared	122	4.5%
Total	2,696	100%
