= Turija (Lukavac) =

- Village
- Location within Bosnia and Herzegovina
- Country: Bosnia and Herzegovina
- Entity: Federation of Bosnia and Herzegovina
- Canton: Tuzla
- Municipality: Lukavac

Area
  - Total: 0.90 sq mi (2.34 km^{2})

Population (2013)
  - Total: 614
  - Density: 680/sq mi (262/km^{2})

Turija is a village in the municipality of Lukavac, Bosnia and Herzegovina.

== Demographics ==
According to the 2013 census, its population was 614.

Ethnicity in 2013
Ethnicity	Number	Percentage
Bosniaks	597	97.2%
other/undeclared	17	2.8%
Total	614	100%
