= Lukavac =

Lukavac Лукавац
- City
- Grad Lukavac; Град Лукавац; City of Lukavac
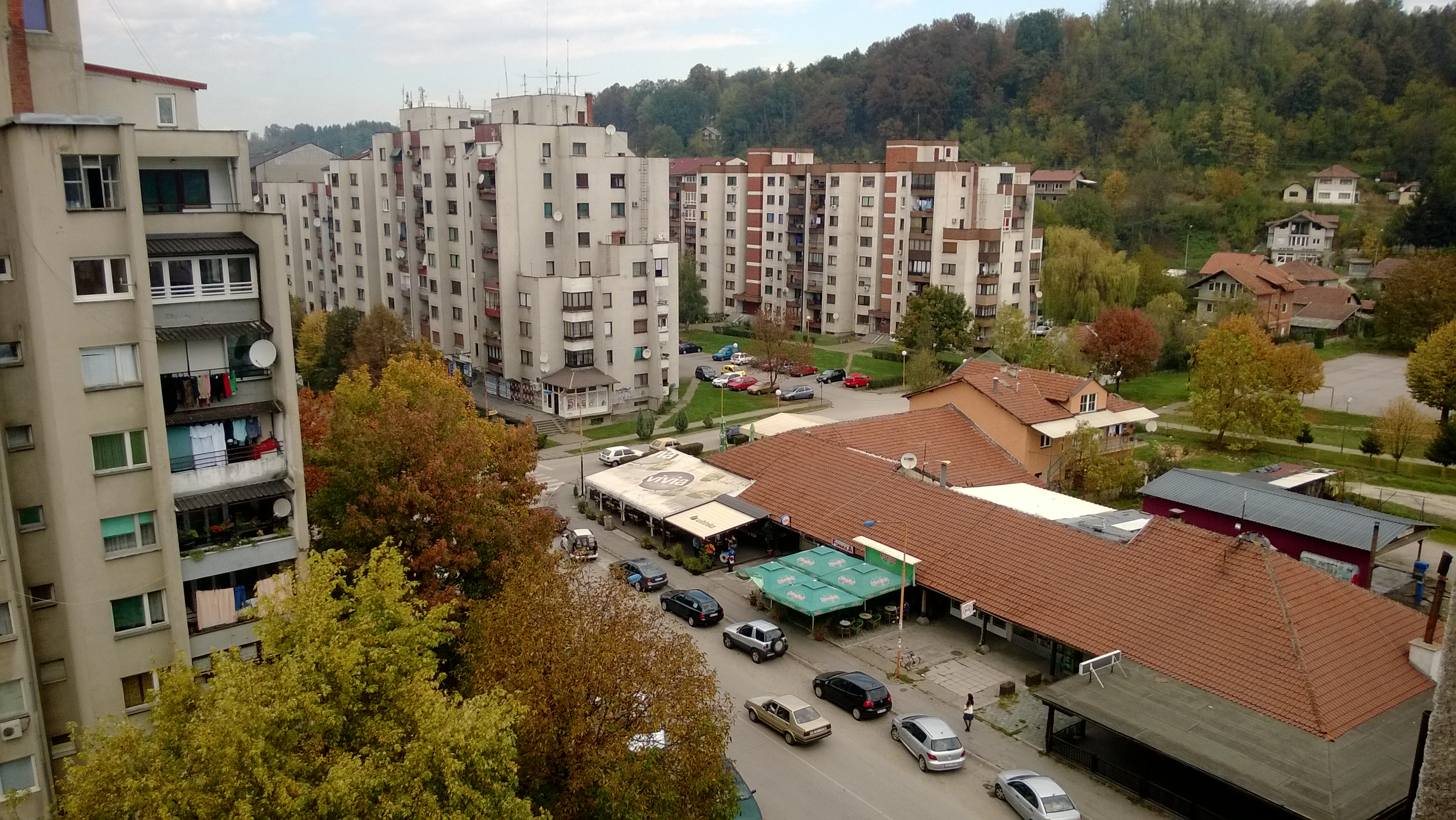

- Flag Coat of arms

- Location of Lukavac
- Coordinates: 44°33′N 18°31′E
- Country: Bosnia and Herzegovina
- Entity: Federation of Bosnia and Herzegovina
- Canton: Tuzla Canton

Government
  - Mayor: Edin Delić (SD BiH)

Area
  - Municipality: 338.36 km^{2} (130.64 sq mi)

Population (2013)
  - Municipality: 44,520
  - Density: 131.6/km^{2} (340.8/sq mi)
  - Urban: 12,061
- Time zone: UTC+1 (CET)
  - Summer (DST): UTC+2 (CEST)
- Area code: +387 35
- Website: www.lukavac.ba

Lukavac (Cyrillic: Лукавац) is a city located in the Tuzla Canton of the Federation of Bosnia and Herzegovina, an entity of Bosnia and Herzegovina. According to the 2013 census, the urban centre has a population of 12,061 inhabitants, with 44,520 inhabitants in the city.

== Geography ==
Lukavac covers an area of 352,66 km2. It shares borders with the cities and municipalities of: Tuzla, Živinice, Banovići, Zavidovići, Maglaj, Petrovo, Gračanica and Srebrenik.

Apart from the urban centre, the city comprises the following villages: Babice Donje • Babice Gornje • Berkovica • Bikodže • Bistarac Donji • Bistarac Gornji • Bokavići • Borice • Brijesnica Donja • Brijesnica Gornja • Caparde • Cerik • Crveno Brdo • Devetak • Dobošnica • Gnojnica • Huskići • Jaruške Donje • Jaruške Gornje • Kalajevo • Komari • Krtova • Kruševica • Lukavac • Lukavac Gornji • Mičijevići • Milino Selo • Modrac • Orahovica • Poljice • Prline • Prokosovići • Puračić • Smoluća Donja • Smoluća Gornja • Semići • Sižje • Stupari • Šikulje • Tabaci • Tumare • Turija • Vasiljevci • Vijenac

== Demographics ==
=== 1971 ===
In 1971, the population of Lukavac was 51,781, made up of:

- 34,010 Bosniaks (65.68%)
- 13,526 Serbs (26.12%)
- 3,111 Croats (6.00%)
- 613 Yugoslavs (1.18%)
- 521 others (1.02%)

=== 1991 ===
In the 1991 census, Lukavac municipality had 56,830 residents:

- Bosniaks (66.8%)
- Serbs (21.5%)
- Croats (3.8%)
- others (8%)

=== 2013 ===
In the 2013 census the municipality of Lukavac had 44,520 residents:

- Bosniaks (86.6%)
- Serbs (3.4%)
- Croats (3.4%)
- others (6.6%)

== Economy ==
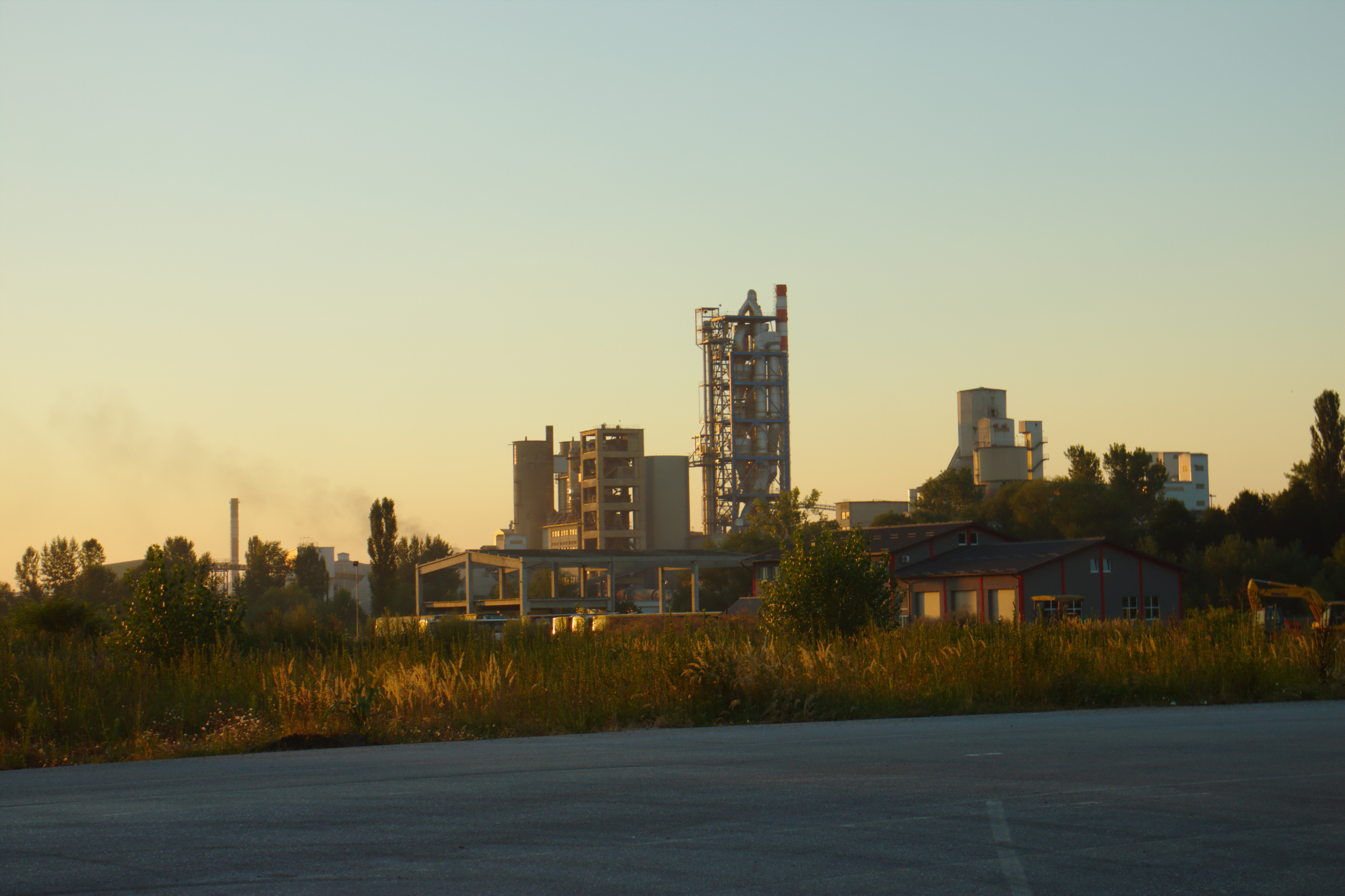
The Lukavac Cement Factory

Lukavac has a strong chemical industry, like the whole Tuzla Canton. The main factories are Soda Lukavac, member of the Turkish Şişecam group and Fabrika Cementa Lukavac — FCL (The Lukavac Cement Factory).

== Sports ==
The city's football club is FK Radnički Lukavac. There is also the Aikido Club "GARD" Lukavac.

The city's karate club (previously known as KK Reweus) has achieved top honours in worldwide karate competitions, and has produced some of the best karate champions in the region. Members of the club regularly represent Bosnia and Herzegovina's national team in world championships.

== Notable residents ==
- Amir Osmanović, footballer
- Sead Osmić, footballer

== Twin towns – sister cities ==
Lukavac is twinned with:

- Ulcinj, Montenegro
- Velenje, Slovenia
