= Primary school Hasan Kikić, Gračanica =

Bosnian primary school

Primary school Hasan Kikić

Location
- 111. Gračaničke brigade br. 2; 75320 Gračanica, Bosnia and Herzegovina
- 44.7064°N 18.3115°E

Information
- Established: 1886; 140 years ago
- Language: Bosnian, Croatian, Serbian
- Website: oshkg.skolatk.edu.ba

The Primary school Hasan Kikić (Serbo-Croatian: Osnovna škola Hasan Kikić/ Основна школа Хасан Кикић) is the first and today central school in Gračanica, Bosnia and Herzegovina.

It was founded in September 1886 as National primary school. The first teacher from Gračanica was Ibrahim Ustavdić. He was the principal of the school from 1912 to 1935. From National primary school, education branched out to most of the present-day territory of Gračanica, and the Primary school Hasan Kikić is its direct successor.

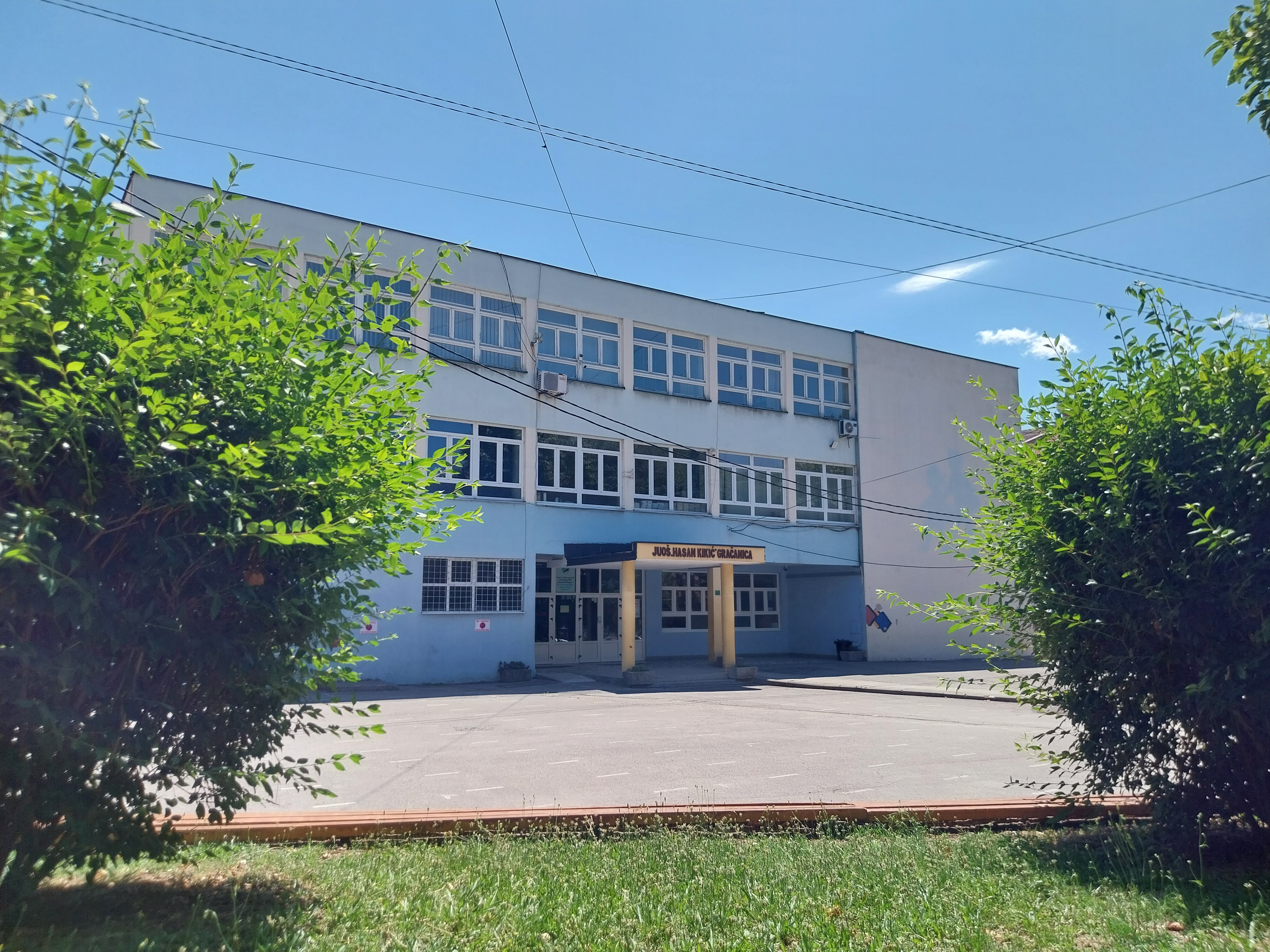
Primary school Hasan Kikić

In december 1959 the National primary school changed its name Primary school Hasan Kikić which is still its name. In 2002, classes were attended by 1163 students, distributed in 50 classes, with 95 employees. The school area of the central school includes over 60% of the territory of Gračanica with the settlements: Centar, Lendići, Javor, Bahići, Pašalići, Malta, Gaj, Varoš, Drafnići, Gornja Lohinja, Mejdanić, Potok Mahala, Čiriš, Seljanuša, Stubo, Riječka, Lipa, Ritešić and Babići, and lately more and more students from Škahovica and Piskavica want to attend classes in this school.

The five-grade school in Babići includes all school-bound students from the surrounding villages. It is 4km away from the central school and has 138 students divided into seven classes.

Also, from 1996 to 2021, a parallel school for elementary music education was operated within the Primary school Hasan Kikić, which was located in a special newly built building next to the central school. The school had status of parallel music school attended by 113 students. Since 2021, the school has separated from the central school and is become an independent primary music school in Gračanica.

In May 2025 Primary school Hasan Kikić became the first producer/prosumer of electricity in the Federation of Bosnia and Herzegovina. In October 2023, a 20 kW photovoltaic power plant (FNE) was installed on the school's roof, intended for its own needs.

== Literature ==
- Osman Delić, Sto godine Narodne osnovne škole u Gračanici, Gračanica, 1986
