= Miričina =

- Village
- Location within Bosnia and Herzegovina
- Coordinates: 44°38′06″N 18°25′08″E
- Country: Bosnia and Herzegovina
- Entity: Federation of Bosnia and Herzegovina
- Canton: Tuzla
- Municipality: Gračanica

Area
  - Total: 3.20 sq mi (8.30 km^{2})

Population (2013)
  - Total: 2,266
  - Density: 707/sq mi (273/km^{2})
- Time zone: UTC+1 (CET)
  - Summer (DST): UTC+2 (CEST)

Miričina is a village in the municipality of Gračanica, Bosnia and Herzegovina.

== Geography ==
Miričina neighbors with villages of Berkovica (municipality of Lukavac), Rašljeva and Orahovica Donja (Municipality of Gračanica), and Porječina (Municipality of Petrovo Selo).

== Economy ==
Regional elevator factory Euro-Prost d.o.o employs 139 employees, who are mostly local workforce.

== Demographics ==
According to the 2013 census, its population was 2,266.

Ethnicity in 2013
Ethnicity	Number	Percentage
Bosniaks	2,237	98.7%
Croats	7	0.3%
Serbs	1	0.0%
other/undeclared	21	0.9%
Total	2,266	100%
