= Edvin Kanka Ćudić =

Bosnian human rights activist (born 1988)

Edvin Kanka Ćudić Едвин Канка Ћудић
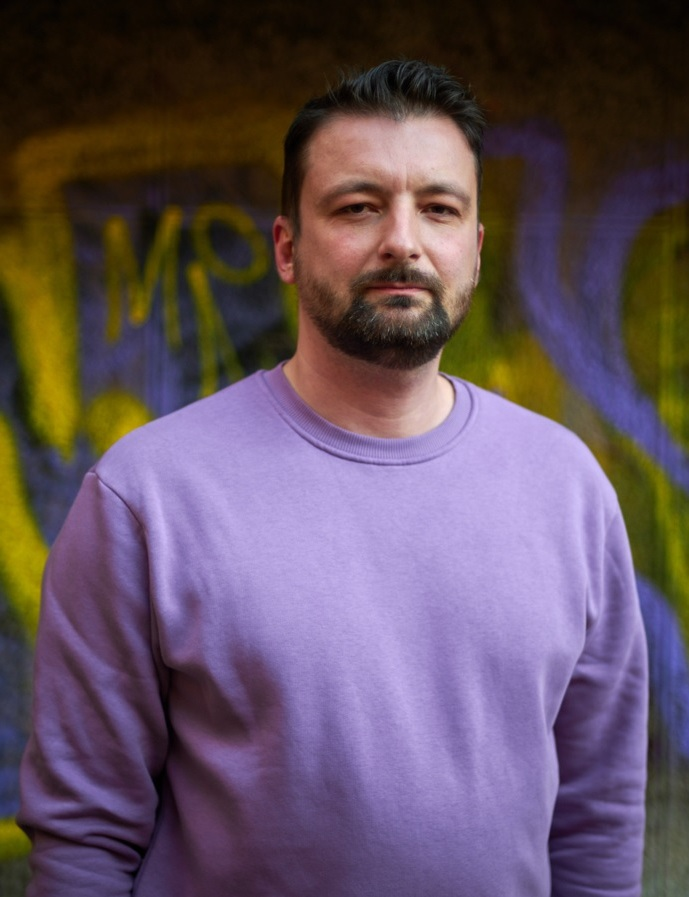
- Ćudić in 2023
- Born: Edvin Ćudić; 31 December 1988 (age 37); Brčko, Yugoslavia
- Education: University of Sarajevo; Ankara University
- Occupations: Human rights activist; journalist; martial artist
- Organization: UDIK (2013–present)
- Writing career
- Years active: 2008–present
- Genres: Reportage; column; interview; feuilleton
- Martial arts career
- Team: Yutaka Dojo (2026-present)
- Rank: 2nd Dan–Jujutsu; 2nd Dan–Aikido; 1st Dan–Judo
- Years active: 2003–present

Other information
- Notable relatives: Ibrahim Ustavdić (maternal great-great-grandfather)

Edvin Kanka Ćudić (Serbo-Croatian Cyrillic: Едвин Канка Ћудић; born 31 December 1988) is a Bosnian human rights activist, martial artist and journalist who is best known as the leader of the UDIK, a non-governmental organisation campaigning for human rights and reconciliation in the former Yugoslavia.

His main work focuses on human rights, dealing with the past, politics of memory, minorities, peacebuilding, and democracy.

== Biography ==
Born as Edvin Ćudić on 31 December 1988 in Brčko, he is the great-great-grandson of the teacher Ibrahim Ustavdić. He grew up in Gračanica and Brčko. He studied at the University of Sarajevo and Ankara University. In 2012, he earned a bachelor's degree in journalism. Six years later, in 2018, he earned a master's degree in political science.

At the age of 14, Ćudić began practicing jujutsu in Brčko, where he was soon introduced to aikido. In 2017, he began formal training in aikido under the guidance of Nihad Klinčević Shidoin, and Pavel Pavelka Fukushidoin. He later continued his training under Alen Hadžiabdić. In 2024, at the 23rd Aikido seminar of Aikikai Serbia in Vrnjačka Banja, he was awarded the rank of 2nd Dan by Saša Obradović Shihan. In 2026, Ćudić founded Yutaka Dojo in Sarajevo. He is a member of Aikikai organizations based in Belgrade and Tokyo.

In 2013, Ćudić founded UDIK. In 2019, he was elected to the Regional Council of the RECOM Reconciliation Network (RMP), representing Bosnia and Herzegovina. Since 2021, he has served on the Board of Directors of the CDTJ, based in Banja Luka. Since 2024, he has served as an International Consultant to the International Committee for Morita Therapy (ICMT), a section of the Japanese Society for Morita Therapy in Tokyo.

Ćudić has been interviewed and has provided expert commentary on a range of issues related to his areas of expertise, including genocide denial, post-conflict recovery, and human rights, for numerous national and international media outlets, including AFP, Berria, Danas, DW, El País, Internazionale, Knack, NIN, Novosti, Oslobođenje, RFE, RTL Nederland, Sveriges Radio, and TV E. He has also been involved in efforts to commemorate the victims of the Kazani pit killings and was among the initiators of the memorial erected at the site in the hills above Sarajevo.

His articles and commentary have appeared in numerous newspapers and magazines, including Danas, Monitor, Oslobođenje, and Peščanik. His stories have been translated into English, French, Italian, Macedonian and Ukrainian. In 2017, he signed the Declaration on the Common Language of the Croats, Serbs, Bosniaks and Montenegrins. He has frequently received threats in connection with his work.

== Awards and recognition ==
In 2012, Bosnian poet Adem Deniz Garić dedicated the poem I ne treba da šutiš (And You Should Not Be Silent) to Edvin Kanka Ćudić. The poem was a response to Ćudić’s story Neću da šutim (I Won’t Be Silent). A decade later, another Bosnian poet, Erbein Osmanović, dedicated the poem Geronimo to Ćudić.

In 2014 and 2018, Ćudić was included in the biographical lexicon Who's Who in BiH, which profiles notable individuals from Bosnia and Herzegovina. In 2019, Bosnian-born French sculptor Mirza Morić created a memorial in Paris commemorating the civilians killed in Brčko during the Bosnian War. The monument bears the full text of Ćudić’s 2011 story Možda bi trebalo da ih mrzim (Maybe I Should Hate Them).

His awards and recognition include the following:

- In 2019, he was named runner-up in the Young Influencer of the Year category at the Emerging Europe Awards.
- In 2023, he received second prize in the Kemal Kurspahić International Journalist Award, presented by the daily newspaper Oslobođenje, for his story Grobnica nade (The Grave of Hope).

== Works ==
- Taj maj '92. Brčko: Ihlas, 2012
- Ne u naše ime: s one strane srbijanskog režima. Sarajevo: UDIK, 2019

=== Selected stories ===
- "Možda bi trebalo da ih mrzim." Sabah, 10 June 2011
- "Neću sa šutim." Preporod, 15 July 2012
- "Oni žive u mome gradu." Peščanik, 28 February 2013
- "Kazani kao sarajevska mrlja u opsadi." Dealing with the Past, 25 Oct. 2019
- "Grobnica nade." Danas, 25 October 2022
- "Zaboravljena ulica." Oslobođenje, 22 April 2026

Preceded by Position created	Coordinator of UDIK; 2013–	Succeeded by Incumbent
