= Karanovac, Petrovo =

Coordinates: 44.6867°N 18.2697°E

Karanovac Карановац
- Village
- Interactive map of Karanovac
- Country: Bosnia and Herzegovina
- Entity: Republika Srpska
- Municipality: Petrovo
- Time zone: UTC+1 (CET)
  - Summer (DST): UTC+2 (CEST)
- Postal code: 74317

Karanovac (Serbian Cyrillic: Карановац) is a village in the municipality of Petrovo, Bosnia and Herzegovina. It was formerly part of the Gračanica municipality. It lies below the Ozren Gora, and the rivers Prenja (south) and Spreča (north-east) pass through it. Karanovac borders Gračanica (north), Sočkovac (east) and Boljanić (west and south).
