= Gymnasium Dr Mustafa Kamarić, Gračanica =

Gymnasium Dr Mustafa Kamarić
- Gimnazija Dr Mustafa Kamarić
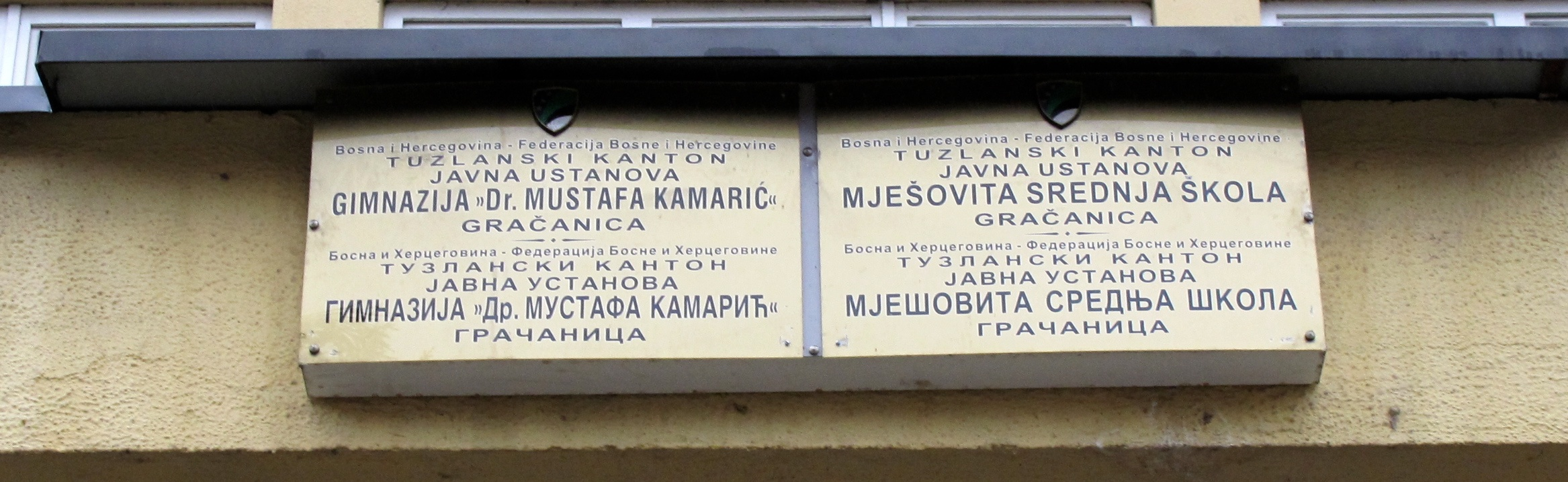

Location
- Mula Mustafe Bašeskije 2; 75320 Gračanica; Bosnia and Herzegovina
- Coordinates: 44.7086°N 18.3090°E

Information
- Type: Public
- Founded: 1959; 67 years ago
- Teaching staff: 31
- Enrollment: 177
- Language: Bosnian, Croatian, Serbian
- Website: https://gdmk.skolatk.edu.ba/

The Gymnasium Dr Mustafa Kamarić (Bosnian: Gimnazija Dr Mustafa Kamarić) is a gymnasium school in Gračanica, Bosnia and Herzegovina. It was founded in September 1959 as Gimnasium Todor Panić. In December 1991 the school changed its name Gimnasium Dr Mustafa Kamarić which is still its name.
