= Paležnica Donja =

Paležnica Donja Палежница Доња
- Village
- Location within Bosnia and Herzegovina
- Coordinates: 44°47′34″N 18°10′52″E
- Country: Bosnia and Herzegovina
- Entity: Federation of Bosnia and Herzegovina; Republika Srpska
- Canton Region: Tuzla; Doboj
- Municipality: Gračanica; Doboj

Area
  - Total: 2.91 sq mi (7.53 km^{2})

Population (2013)
  - Total: 172
  - Density: 59.2/sq mi (22.8/km^{2})
- Time zone: UTC+1 (CET)
  - Summer (DST): UTC+2 (CEST)

Paležnica Donja (Cyrillic: Палежница Доња) is a village in the municipalities of Doboj and Gračanica, Bosnia and Herzegovina.

== Demographics ==
According to the 2013 census, its population was 172, all of them living in the Doboj part, thus none in Gračanica municipality.

Ethnicity in 2013
Ethnicity	Number	Percentage
Croats	2	1.2%
Bosniaks	169	98.3%
Other	1	0.6%
Total	172	100%
