= Lendići =

Lendići may refer to:

- Lendići (Gračanica)
- Lendići (Jajce)
