= Muhamed Ustavdić =

Bosnian physician (1920-2007)

Muhamed Ustavdić Мухамед Уставдић
- Born: 1920; Gračanica, Kingdom of Yugoslavia
- Died: 2007 (aged 86–87); Srebrenik, Bosnia and Herzegovina
- Resting place: Režići Cemetery, Gračanica
- Occupation: Physician
- Father: Ibrahim Ustavdić

Muhamed Ustavdić (Serbo-Croatian Cyrillic: Мухамед Уставдић; 1920-2007) was a Bosnian physician.

== Biography ==
He was born in 1920 in Gračanica, the son of the teacher Ibrahim Ustavdić. He worked as a doctor in Libya, Tunisia and Lebanon. For more than ten years he provided medical assistance to numerous Palestinian refugees staying in refugee camps in Beirut. At one time he also treated Yasser Arafat. Later, he came back to Yugoslavia and worked as the director of the Health Center in Srebrenik.

Ustavdić died in 2007. He was buried next to his father at the Režići Cemetery in Gračanica. In 2017, the Embassy of the State of Palestine in Bosnia and Herzegovina posthumously awarded him a plaque with the coat of arms of Palestine, in gratitude for all he has done for the Palestinians.
