= Malešići =

Malešići may refer to:

- Malešići (Gračanica), a village in the municipality of Gračanica, Bosnia and Herzegovina
- Malešići (Ilijaš), a village in the municipality of Ilijaš, Bosnia and Herzegovina
