= Režići Cemetery =

Cemetery in Bosnia and Herzegovina

Mezarje Režići
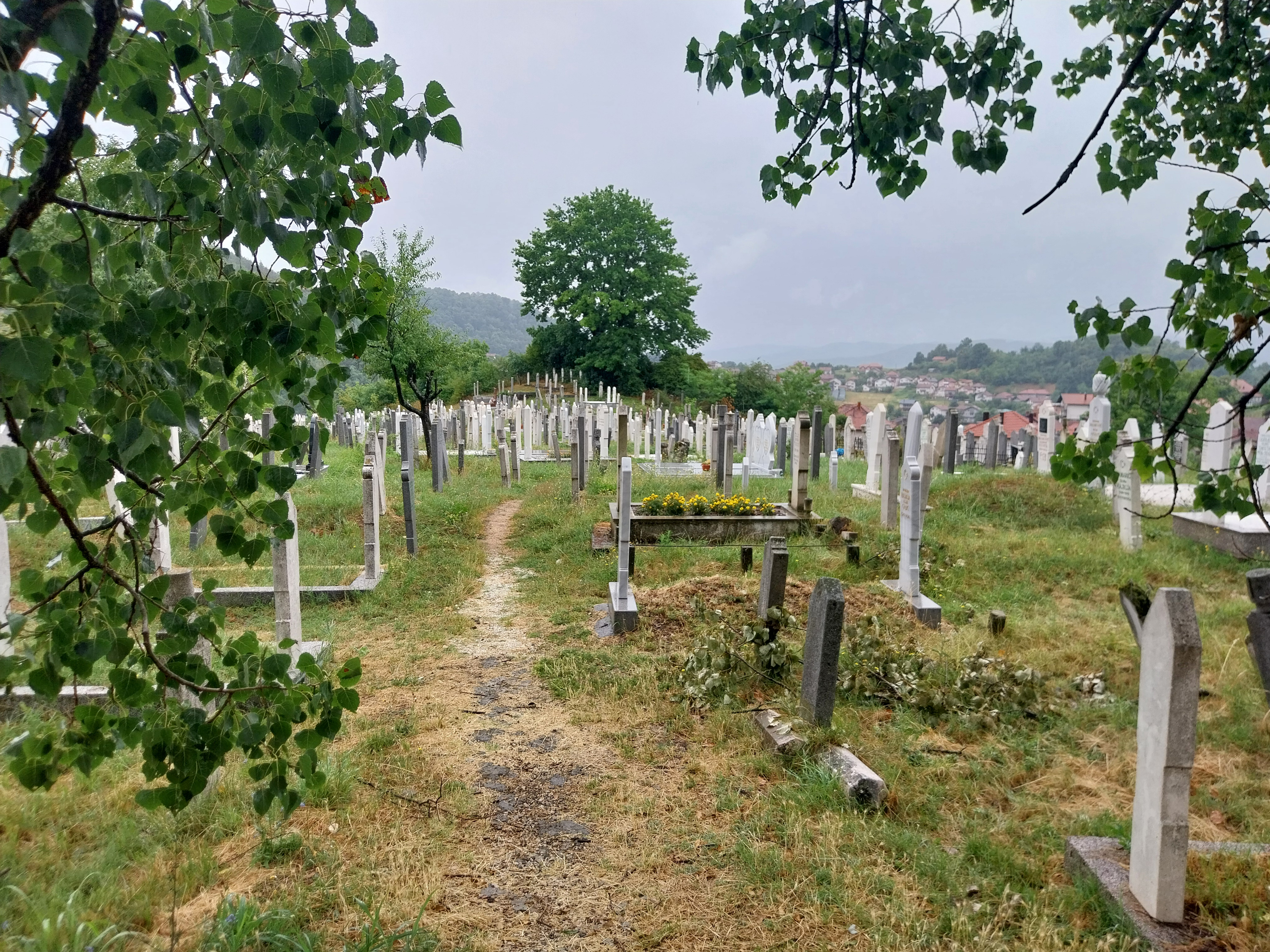
- Old gravestones in Režići Cemetery
- Interactive map of Mezarje Režići

Details
- Location: Gračanica, Tuzla Canton
- Country: Bosnia and Herzegovina
- Coordinates: 44°42′13″N 18°18′15″E
- Type: Public
- Owned by: Islamic Community in Bosnia and Herzegovina

The Režići Cemetery (Bosnian: Mezarje Režići), a.k.a. Režići, is the Muslim cemetery in city of Gračanica, Bosnia and Herzegovina. It is located on the Patkovača Hill between two neighborhoods, Lipa and Čiriš. Across the Režići is the Šabuša Cemetery. They are separated by street.

The Režići Cemetery is in the registry of the Institute for the Protection and Use of Cultural–Historical and Natural Heritage of Tuzla Canton.

== Gallery ==
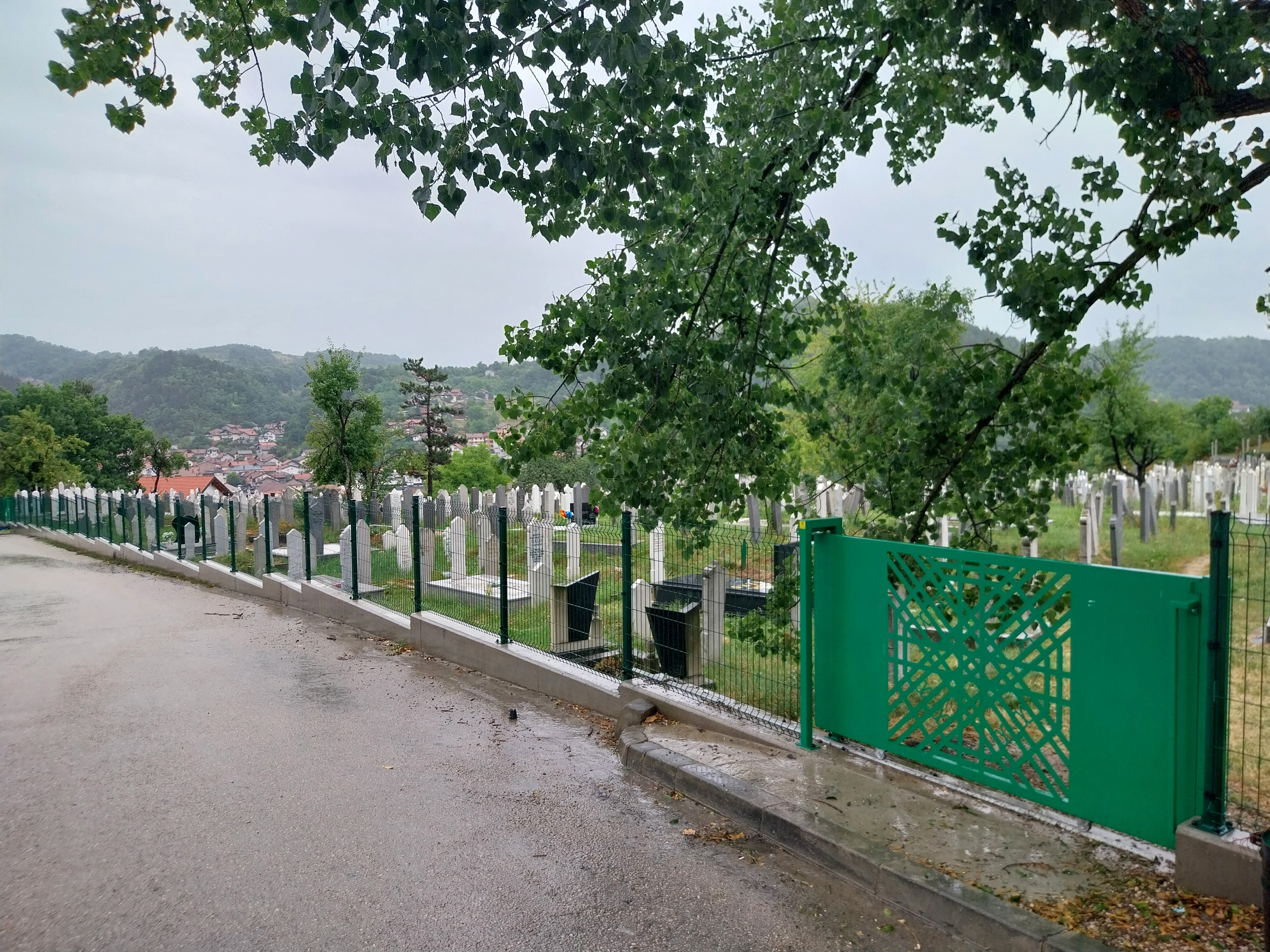

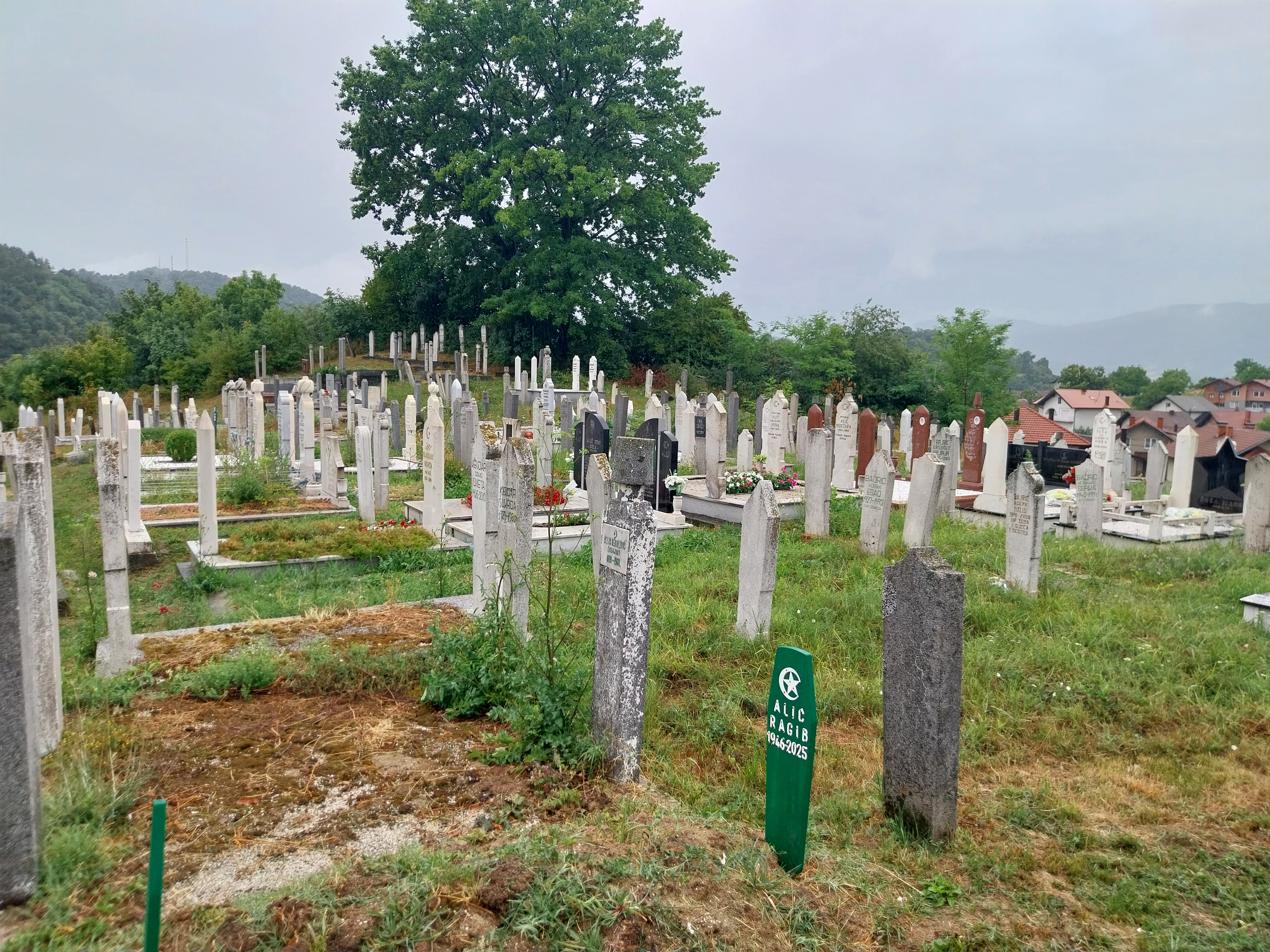

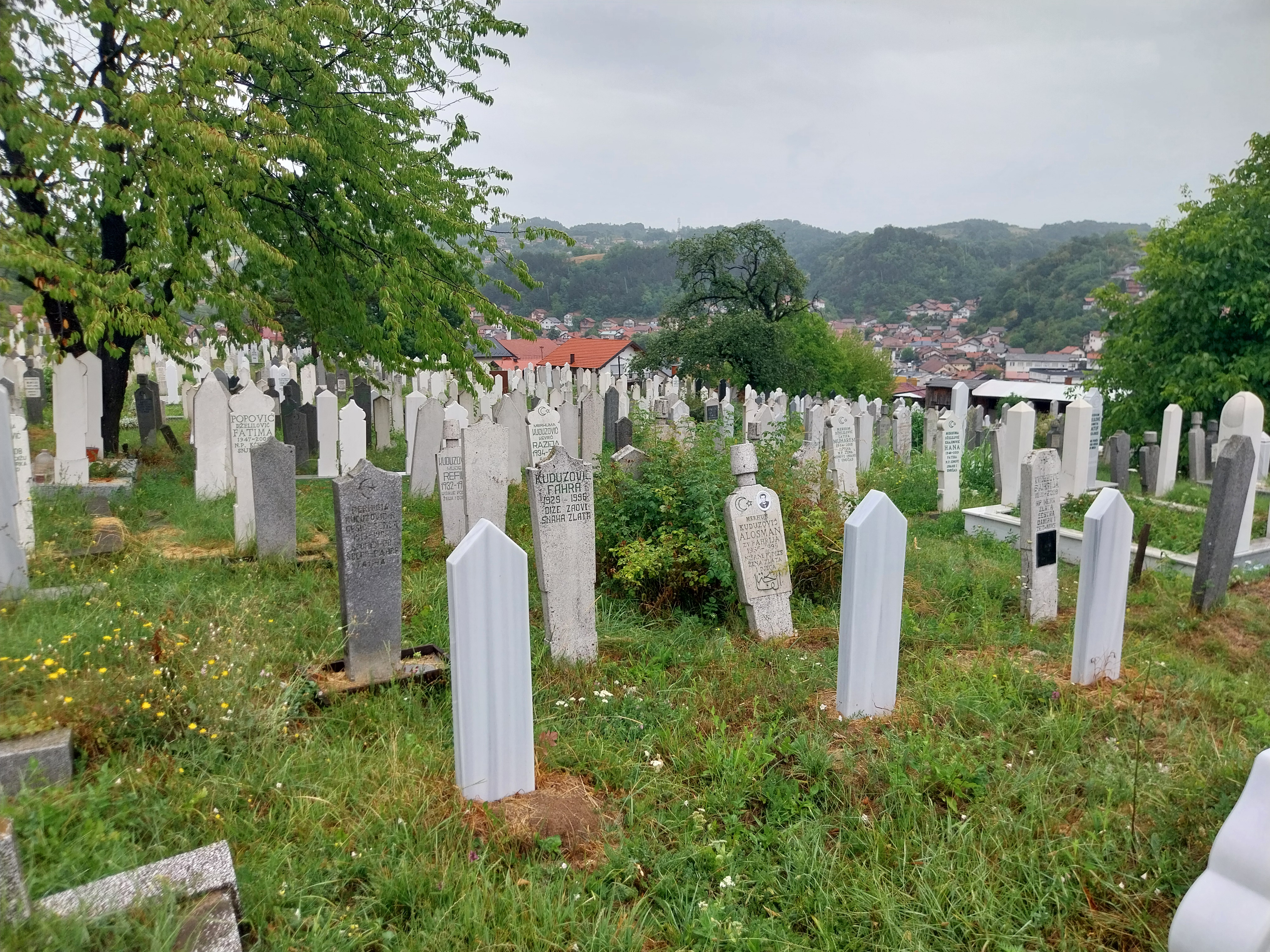

== Notable burials ==
List is sorted in order of the year of death.

- Ibrahim Ustavdić (1878–1974), first teacher from Gračanica
- Muhamed Ustavdić (1920–2007), physician
- Hadžija Grbić (1946-2020), first female teacher of sport in Gračanica
- Kamo Kusturica (1935–2021), first cinema operator in Gračanica
