= Ibrahim Ustavdić =

Bosnian educator (1878-1974)

Effendi Ibrahim Ustavdić Ибрахим Уставдић
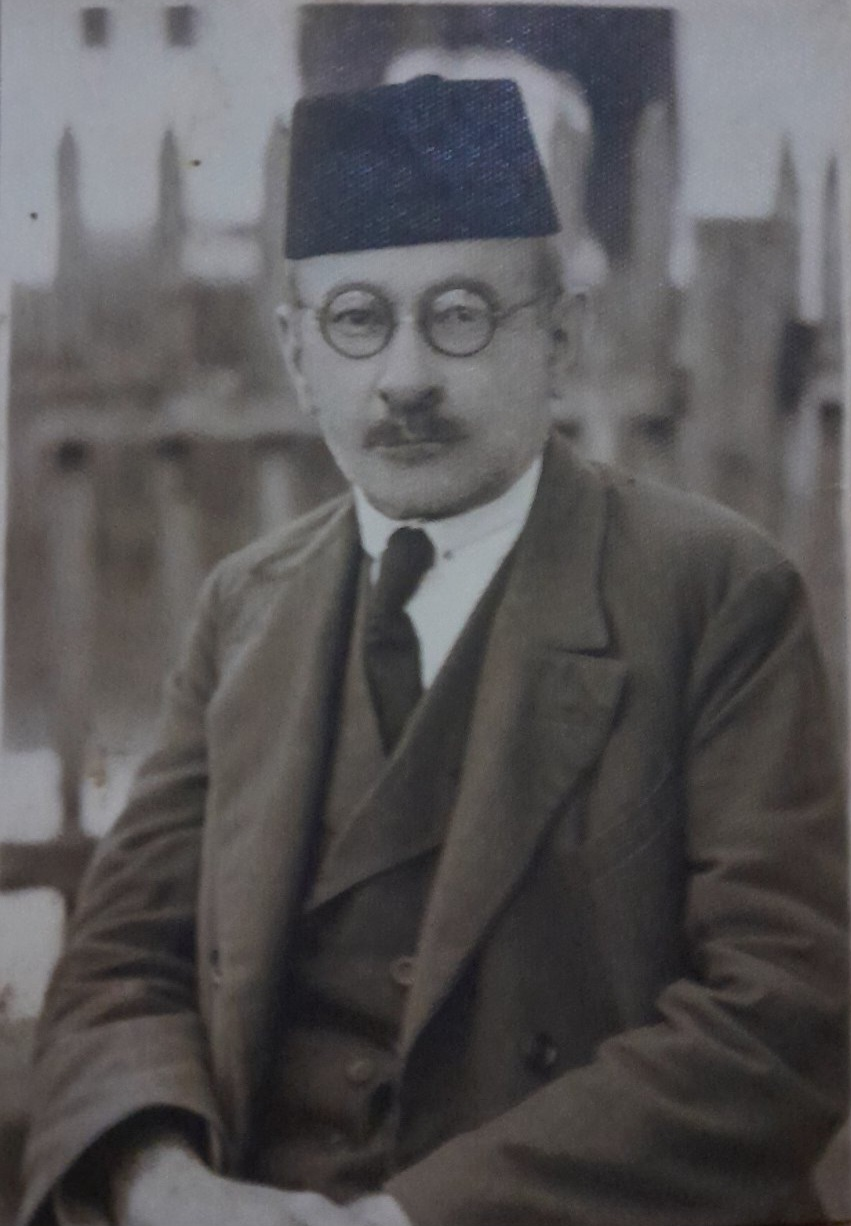
- Born: 1878; Gračanica, Austria-Hungary
- Died: 1974 (aged 95–96); Sarajevo, Yugoslavia
- Resting place: Režići Cemetery, Gračanica
- Occupations: Teacher, school inspector and principal
- Children: inter alia, Emina, Tima, Ajša, Lejla, Nadija, Hidajeta, Muhamed, Fuad, Sead, Fahrudin
- Parent: Emin Ustavdić
- Relatives: Edvin Kanka Ćudić (great-great-grandson)

Ibrahim ef. Ustavdić (Serbo-Croatian Cyrillic: Ибрахим Уставдић; 1878-1974) was a Bosnian educator, the first teacher from Gračanica, school inspector, and principal of the first National Primary School in Gračanica. He was the father of Muhamed Ustavdić and was a great-great-grandfather of Edvin Kanka Ćudić.

== Biography ==
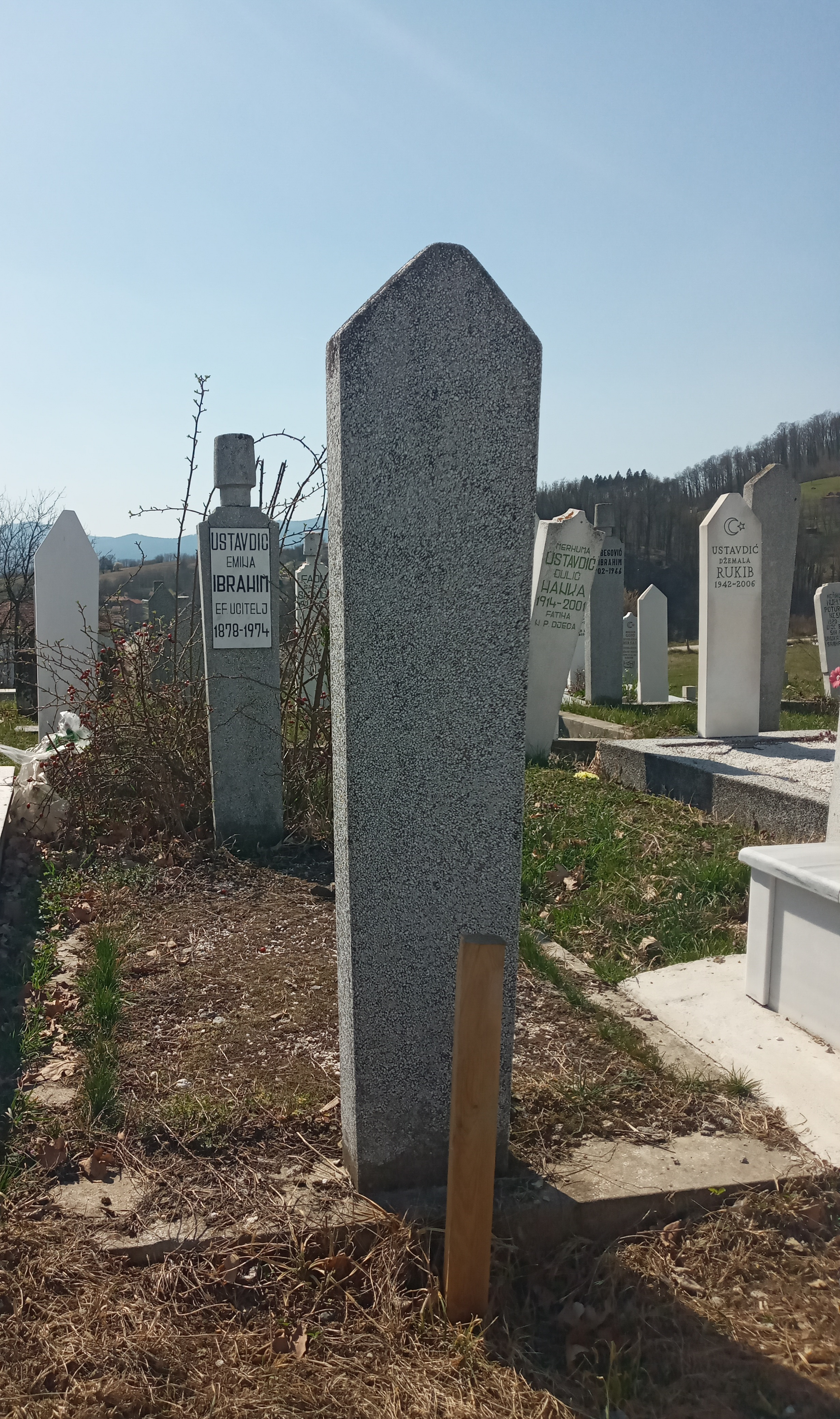
Grave of Ibrahim Ustavdić, Režići Cemetery in Gračanica.

Ibrahim Ustavdić was born in Gračanica in 1878. He completed his primary education at the National Primary School in his hometown in 1897. He subsequently graduated from a teacher-training school. He held the title of effendi, an honorific used in various social and religious contexts, as indicated by the Latin-script inscription on his grave.

In 1902, Ustavdić was appointed as a temporary teacher in Bosanska Otoka. He was transferred to Kozarac in 1903 and to Prijedor in 1904. In early 1905, he was transferred to the National Primary School in Gračanica, where he worked until 1935. From 1912 to 1935, Ustavdić served as principal of the National Primary School in Gračanica. In 1935, he was appointed school inspector in Gračanica, a position he held until his retirement in 1938. He worked as a teacher in Gračanica for more than thirty years. The Archives of Bosnia and Herzegovina in Sarajevo preserve two oaths signed by Ustavdić, dated 1918 and 1921. In both documents, he is identified as the principal of the National Primary School in Gračanica.

In addition to his work as a teacher and principal of the National Primary School, Ustavdić participated in the educational reform of the Osman-kapetan Madrasa in Gračanica in 1930. When the local board of Gajret was established in Gračanica in 1903, Ustavdić was among its first officials, serving as a second-tier member. He was also one of the financial contributors to the erection of a monument at the grave of Croatian poet Silvije Strahimir Kranjčević in Sarajevo. When the monument to King Alexander I of Yugoslavia was unveiled in Gračanica in October 1936, Ustavdić was among the local officials present at the ceremony. He laid two wreaths on behalf of the local schools.

After his retirement, Ustavdić moved to Sarajevo, where he died in the spring of 1974. In accordance with his wishes, he was buried in Gračanica, at Režići Cemetery. A large number of people attended his funeral in Gračanica, including students and teachers of the Primary school Hasan Kikić, as well as delegations of students and teachers from other schools.

Political offices
Preceded by -	Principal of the National Primary School in Gračanica; 1912–1935	Succeeded by Mustafa Žiško
Preceded by -	School inspector in Gračanica; 1935–1938	Succeeded by Šefik Bešlagić
