= Skipovac Donji =

Skipovac Donji Скиповац Доњи
- Village
- Location within Bosnia and Herzegovina
- Coordinates: 44°47′50″N 18°13′50″E
- Country: Bosnia and Herzegovina
- Entity: Federation of Bosnia and Herzegovina
- Canton: Tuzla
- Municipality: Gračanica

Area
  - Total: 3.93 sq mi (10.17 km^{2})

Population (2013)
  - Total: 2
  - Density: 0.51/sq mi (0.20/km^{2})
- Time zone: UTC+1 (CET)
  - Summer (DST): UTC+2 (CEST)

Skipovac Donji (Cyrillic: Скиповац Доњи) is a village in the municipality of Gračanica, Bosnia and Herzegovina.

== Demographics ==
According to the 2013 census, its population was 2, both Serbs.
