= Krtova =

Krtova Кртова
- Village
- Location within Bosnia and Herzegovina
- Coordinates: 44°34′55″N 18°24′39″E
- Country: Bosnia and Herzegovina
- Entity: Republika Srpska; Federation of Bosnia and Herzegovina
- Region Canton: Doboj; Tuzla
- Municipality: Petrovo; Lukavac

Area
  - Total: 4.79 sq mi (12.40 km^{2})

Population (2013)
  - Total: 409
  - Density: 85.4/sq mi (33.0/km^{2})

Krtova (Cyrillic: Кртова) is a village in the municipalities of Petrovo (Republika Srpska) and Lukavac, Bosnia and Herzegovina.

== Demographics ==
According to the 2013 census, its population was 409, with 138 of them living in the Petrovo area and 271 in the Lukavac area.

Ethnicity in 2013
Ethnicity	Number	Percentage
Serbs	266	98.2%
Croats	2	0.7%
other/undeclared	3	1.1%
Total	409	100%
