= Džakule =

- Village
- Location within Bosnia and Herzegovina
- Coordinates: 44.7817532°N 18.3682762°E
- Country: Bosnia and Herzegovina
- Entity: Federation of Bosnia and Herzegovina
- Canton: Tuzla
- Municipality: Gračanica

Area
  - Total: 6.66 sq mi (17.25 km^{2})

Population (2013)
  - Total: 1,929
  - Density: 289.6/sq mi (111.8/km^{2})
- Time zone: UTC+1 (CET)
  - Summer (DST): UTC+2 (CEST)

Džakule is a village in the municipality of Gračanica, Bosnia and Herzegovina.

== Demographics ==
According to the 2013 census, its population was 1,929.

Ethnicity in 2013
Ethnicity	Number	Percentage
Bosniaks	1,928	99.9%
other/undeclared	1	0.1%
Total	1,929	100%
