= Lukavica (Gračanica) =

Lukavica Лукавица
- Village
- Location within Bosnia and Herzegovina
- Coordinates: 44°45′46″N 18°10′08″E
- Country: Bosnia and Herzegovina
- Entity: Federation of Bosnia and Herzegovina
- Canton: Tuzla
- Municipality: Gračanica

Area
  - Total: 5.86 sq mi (15.19 km^{2})

Population (2013)
  - Total: 2,762
  - Density: 470.9/sq mi (181.8/km^{2})
- Time zone: UTC+1 (CET)
  - Summer (DST): UTC+2 (CEST)

Lukavica (Cyrillic: Лукавица) is a village in the municipality of Gračanica, Bosnia and Herzegovina.

== Demographics ==
According to the 2013 census, its population was 2,762.

Ethnicity in 2013
Ethnicity	Number	Percentage
Bosniaks	2,709	98.1%
Croats	4	0.1%
other/undeclared	49	1.8%
Total	2,762	100%
