= Pribava =

- Village
- Location within Bosnia and Herzegovina
- Coordinates: 44°41′N 18°19′E
- Country: Bosnia and Herzegovina
- Entity: Federation of Bosnia and Herzegovina
- Canton: Tuzla
- Municipality: Gračanica

Area
  - Total: 1.65 sq mi (4.28 km^{2})

Population (2013)
  - Total: 2,096
  - Density: 1,270/sq mi (490/km^{2})
- Time zone: UTC+1 (CET)
  - Summer (DST): UTC+2 (CEST)

Pribava is a village in the municipality of Gračanica, Bosnia and Herzegovina.

== Population ==
| Group | 1991 | 2013 |
|---|---|---|
| Total | 1,682 | 2,096 |
| Muslims | 1,560 | 2,074 |
| Serbians | 70 | 2 |
| Croatians | 2 | 1 |
| Yugoslavs | 36 | |
| Others | 14 | 19 |
