= Soko (Gračanica) =

- Village
- Location within Bosnia and Herzegovina
- Coordinates: 44°45′N 18°21′E
- Country: Bosnia and Herzegovina
- Entity: Federation of Bosnia and Herzegovina
- Canton: Tuzla
- Municipality: Gračanica

Area
  - Total: 4.42 sq mi (11.46 km^{2})

Population (2013)
  - Total: 1,746
  - Density: 394.6/sq mi (152.4/km^{2})
- Time zone: UTC+1 (CET)
  - Summer (DST): UTC+2 (CEST)

Soko is a village in the municipality of Gračanica, Bosnia and Herzegovina. Fortress Soko is located near the village.

== Demographics ==
According to the 2013 census, its population was 1,746.

Ethnicity in 2013
Ethnicity	Number	Percentage
Bosniaks	1,722	98.6%
other/undeclared	24	1.4%
Total	1,746	100%
