= Vranovići (Gračanica) =

Vranovići Врановићи
- Village
- Location within Bosnia and Herzegovina
- Country: Bosnia and Herzegovina
- Entity: Federation of Bosnia and Herzegovina
- Canton: Tuzla
- Municipality: Gračanica

Area
  - Total: 1.92 sq mi (4.96 km^{2})

Population (2013)
  - Total: 1,001
  - Density: 523/sq mi (202/km^{2})
- Time zone: UTC+1 (CET)
  - Summer (DST): UTC+2 (CEST)

Vranovići is a village in the municipality of Gračanica, Bosnia and Herzegovina.

== Demographics ==
According to the 2013 census, its population was 1,001.

Ethnicity in 2013
Ethnicity	Number	Percentage
Bosniaks	998	99.7%
other/undeclared	3	0.3%
Total	1,001	100%
