= Ozren Monastery =

Serbian Orthodox monastery near Petrovo, Bosnia and Herzegovina

Coordinates: 44.598333°N 18.331111°E

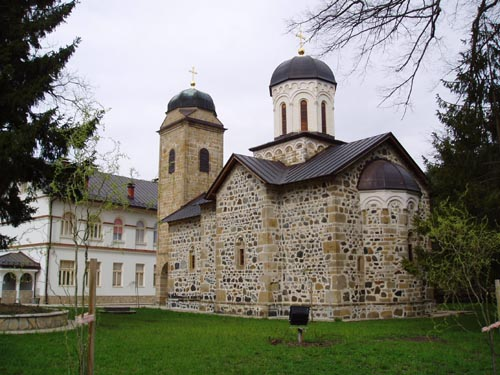
Church of the Ozren Monastery

The Ozren Monastery (Serbian: Манастир Озрен, romanized: Manastir Ozren) is a Serbian Orthodox monastery dedicated to Saint Nicholas and located 6 kilometres from the town of Petrovo in northern Republika Srpska, Bosnia and Herzegovina. It is the spiritual centre of the area of Mount Ozren. It was probably founded in the second half of the 16th century, during the office of Serbian Patriarch Makarije Sokolović, who was granted permission from the sultan of the Ottoman Empire to renovate and build churches and monasteries. Folk tradition, formed in the 18th century, has it that the Ozren Monastery was founded by King Dragutin, a member of the Serbian Nemanjić dynasty, who ruled north-eastern Bosnia from 1284 to 1316.

The frescoes in the monastery's church were painted in the early 17th century. After the Great Turkish War (1683–1699), the monastery fell into disrepair. The renovation of the church began in 1842, after it was allowed by Ottoman authorities. The bell tower outside the church was built in 1872. The church was also refurbished in 1920 and 1996. Among its icons is a Pietà painted in the 17th century by Emmanuel Lambardos, a painter of the Cretan School. The Ozren Monastery was designated as a National Monument of Bosnia and Herzegovina in 2003.

== Gallery ==
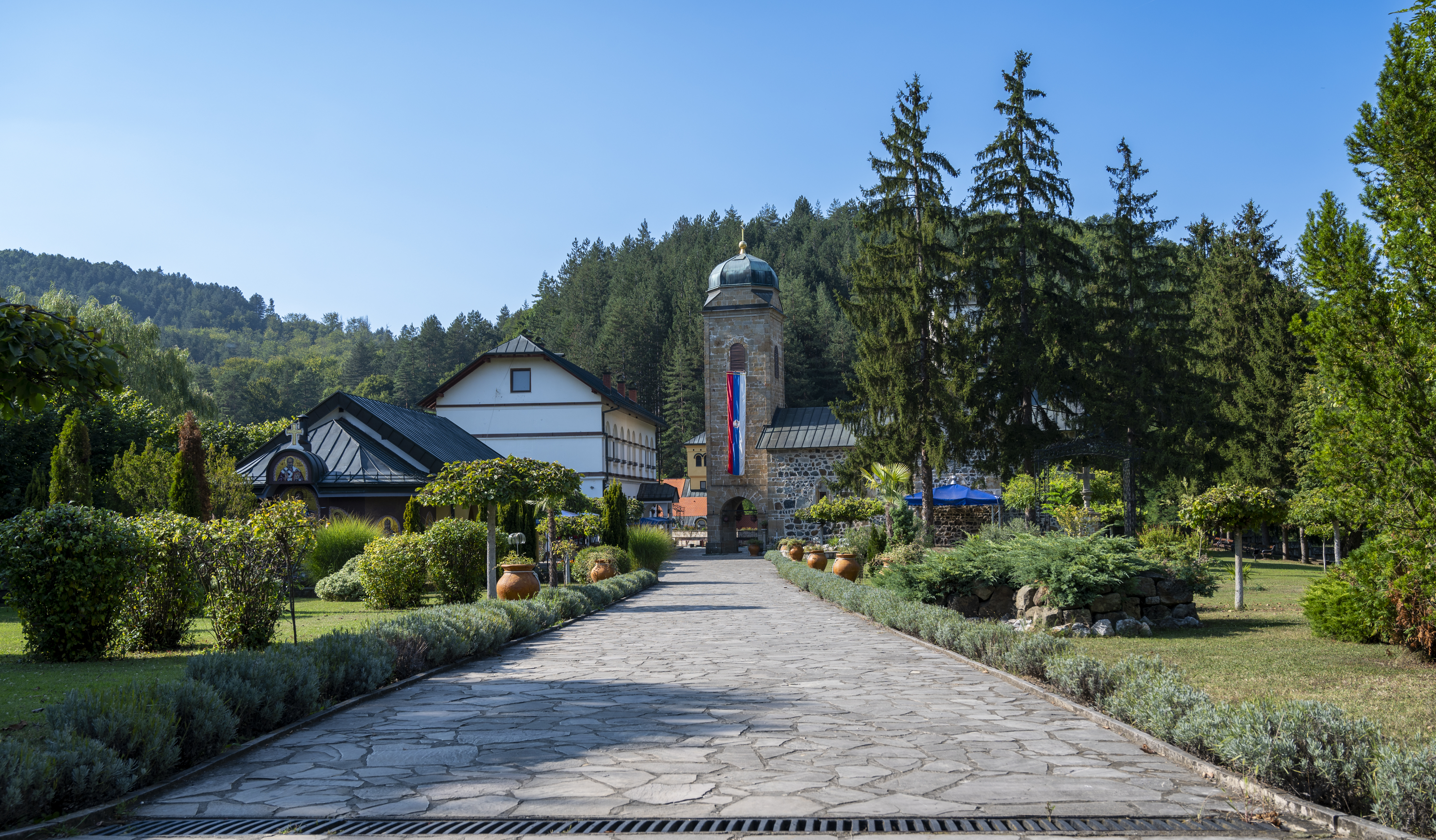

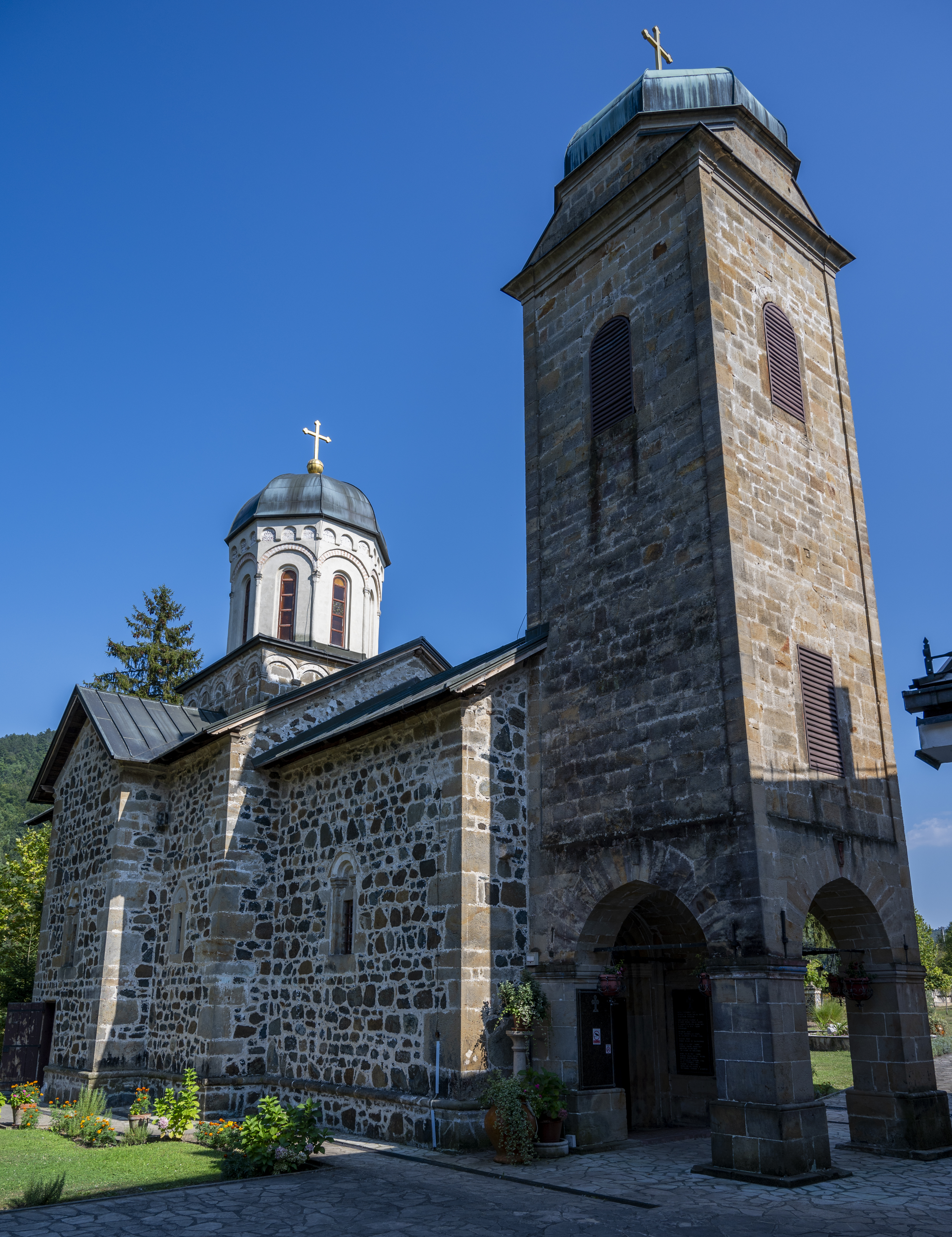

== See also ==
- List of Serbian Orthodox monasteries
