= Prijeko Brdo =

- Village
- Location within Bosnia and Herzegovina
- Coordinates: 44°46′25.7″N 18°20′10.11″E
- Country: Bosnia and Herzegovina
- Entity: Federation of Bosnia and Herzegovina
- Canton: Tuzla
- Municipality: Gračanica

Area
  - Total: 1.74 sq mi (4.51 km^{2})

Population (2013)
  - Total: 386
  - Density: 222/sq mi (85.6/km^{2})
- Time zone: UTC+1 (CET)
  - Summer (DST): UTC+2 (CEST)
- Area code: (+387) 35

Prijeko Brdo is a village in the municipality of Gračanica, Bosnia and Herzegovina.

== Demographics ==
According to the 2013 census, its population was 386.

Ethnicity in 2013
Ethnicity	Number	Percentage
Bosniaks	385	99.3%
other/undeclared	1	0.6%
Total	386	100%
