= Doborovci =

- Village
- Location within Bosnia and Herzegovina
- Country: Bosnia and Herzegovina
- Entity: Federation of Bosnia and Herzegovina
- Canton: Tuzla
- Municipality: Gračanica

Area
  - Total: 4.76 sq mi (12.32 km^{2})

Population (2013)
  - Total: 1,854
  - Density: 389.8/sq mi (150.5/km^{2})
- Time zone: UTC+1 (CET)
  - Summer (DST): UTC+2 (CEST)

Doborovci is a village in the municipality of Gračanica, Bosnia and Herzegovina.

== Demographics ==
According to the 2013 census, its population was 1,854.

Ethnicity in 2013
Ethnicity	Number	Percentage
Bosniaks	1,831	98.8%
other/undeclared	23	1.2%
Total	1,854	100%
