= Petrovo, Bosnia and Herzegovina =

Town and municipality in Bosnia and Herzegovina

Coordinates: 44°37′54″N 18°21′40″E

Petrovo Петрово
- Town and municipality
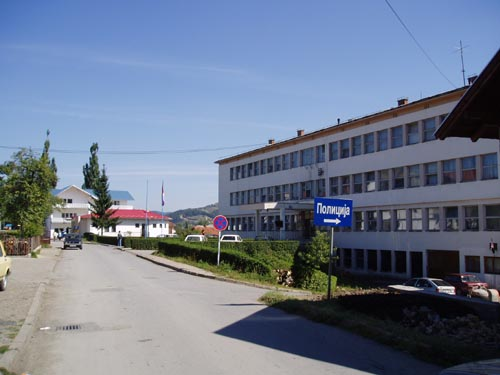
- Town hall in Petrovo

- Location of Petrovo within Bosnia and Herzegovina

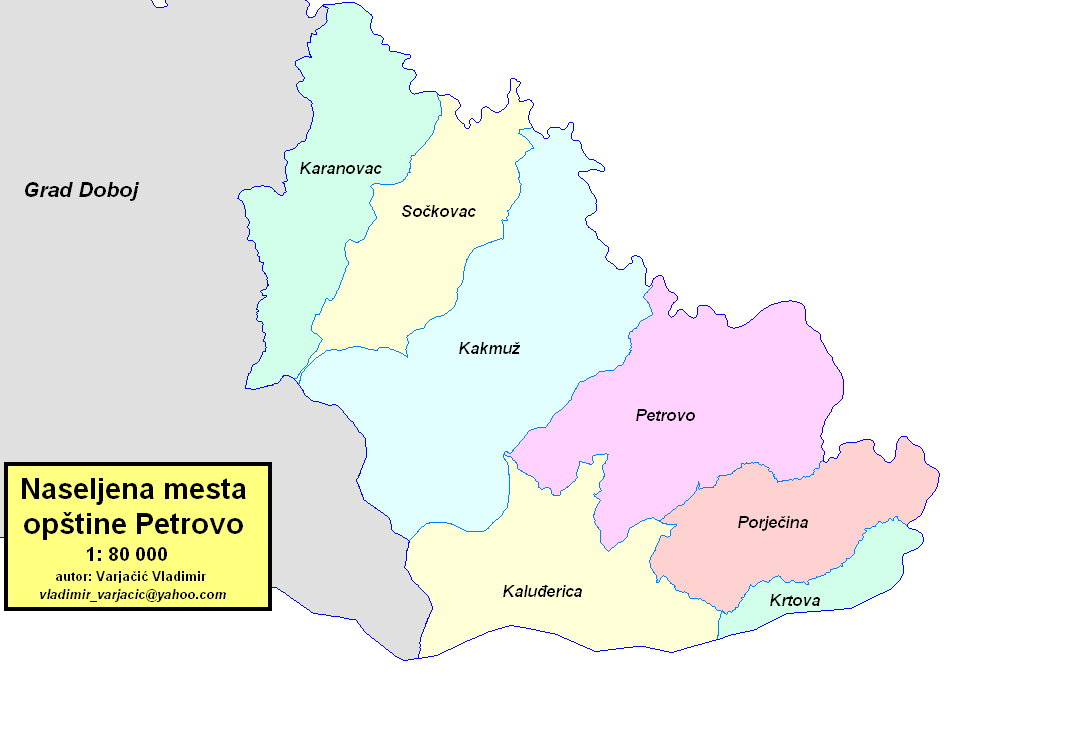
- Country: Bosnia and Herzegovina
- Entity: Republika Srpska

Government
  - Municipal mayor: Ozren Petković (SNSD)
  - Municipality: 143.9 km^{2} (55.6 sq mi)

Population (2013 census)
  - Town: 2,322
  - Municipality: 6,474
  - Municipality density: 44.99/km^{2} (116.5/sq mi)
- Time zone: UTC+1 (CET)
  - Summer (DST): UTC+2 (CEST)
- Area code: 53
- Website: www.petrovo.ba

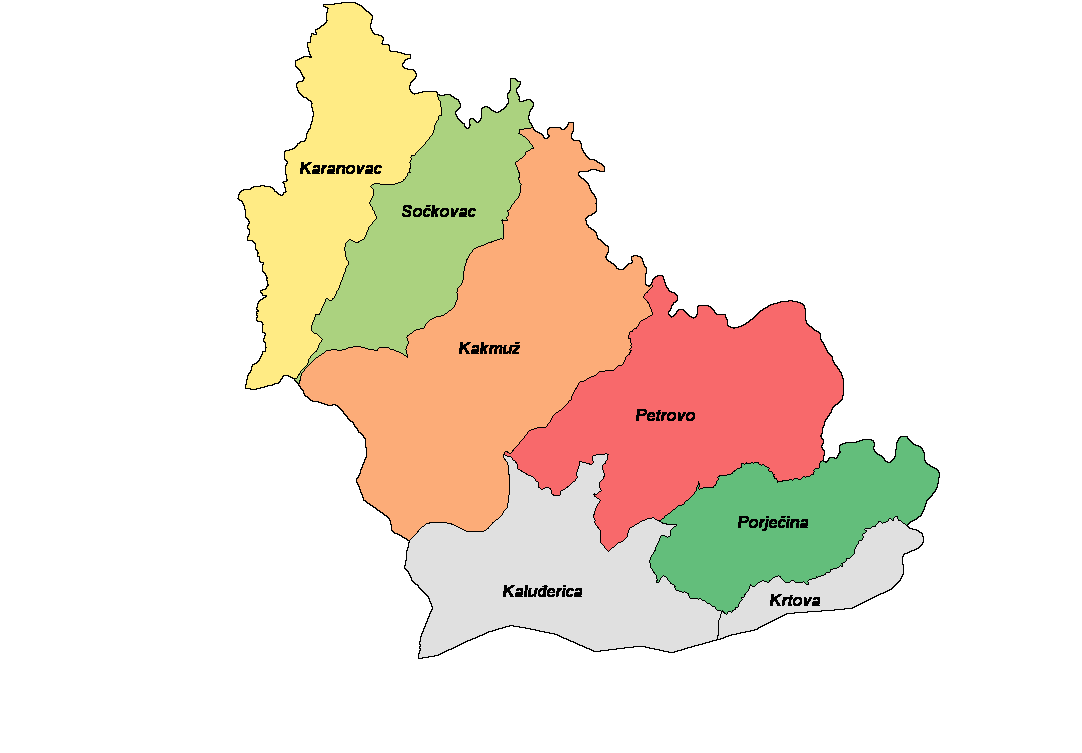
Petrovo municipality by population proportional to the settlement with the highest and lowest population

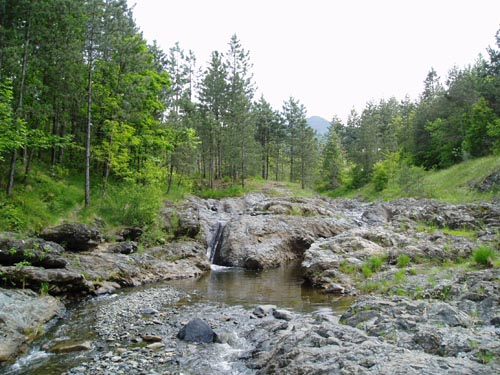
Ozren

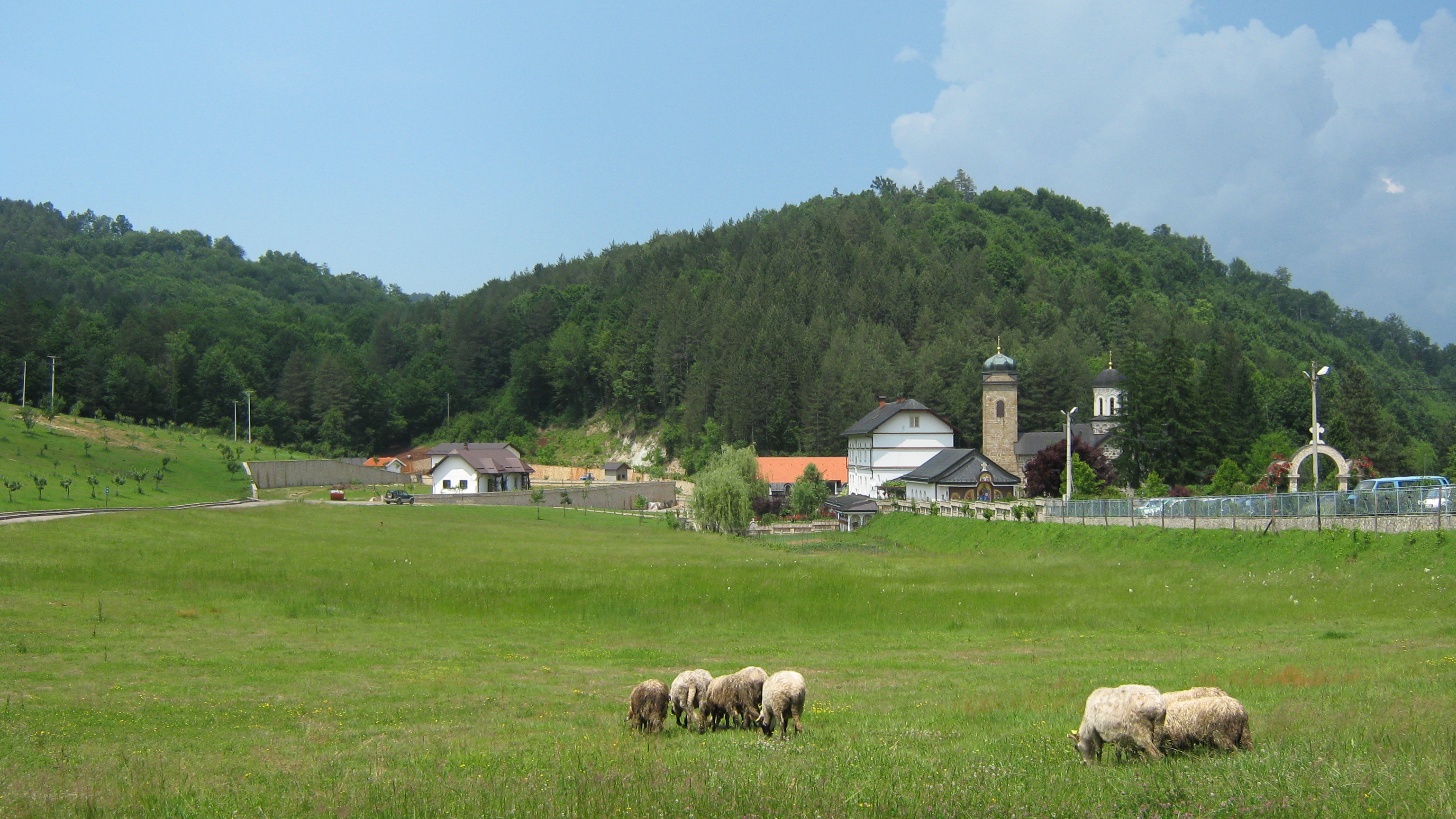
Ozren

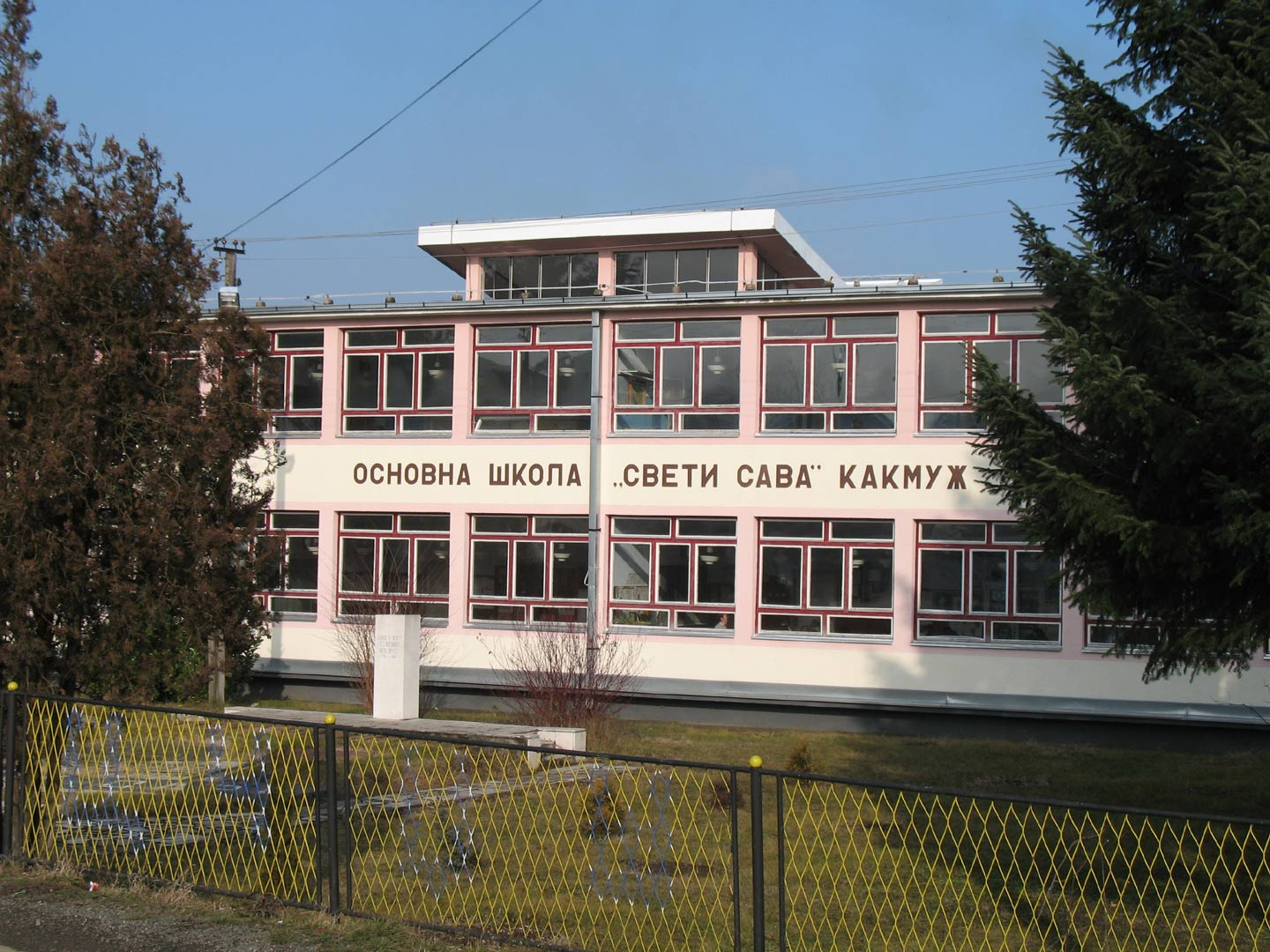
Primary school Saint Sava

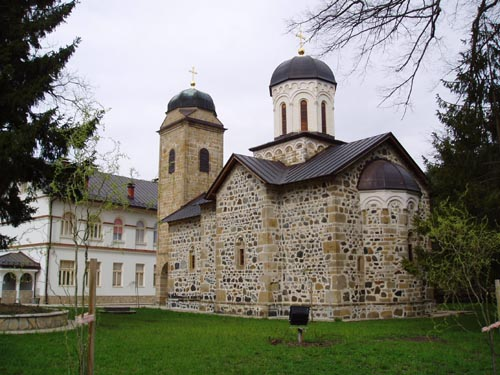
Church of the Ozren Monastery

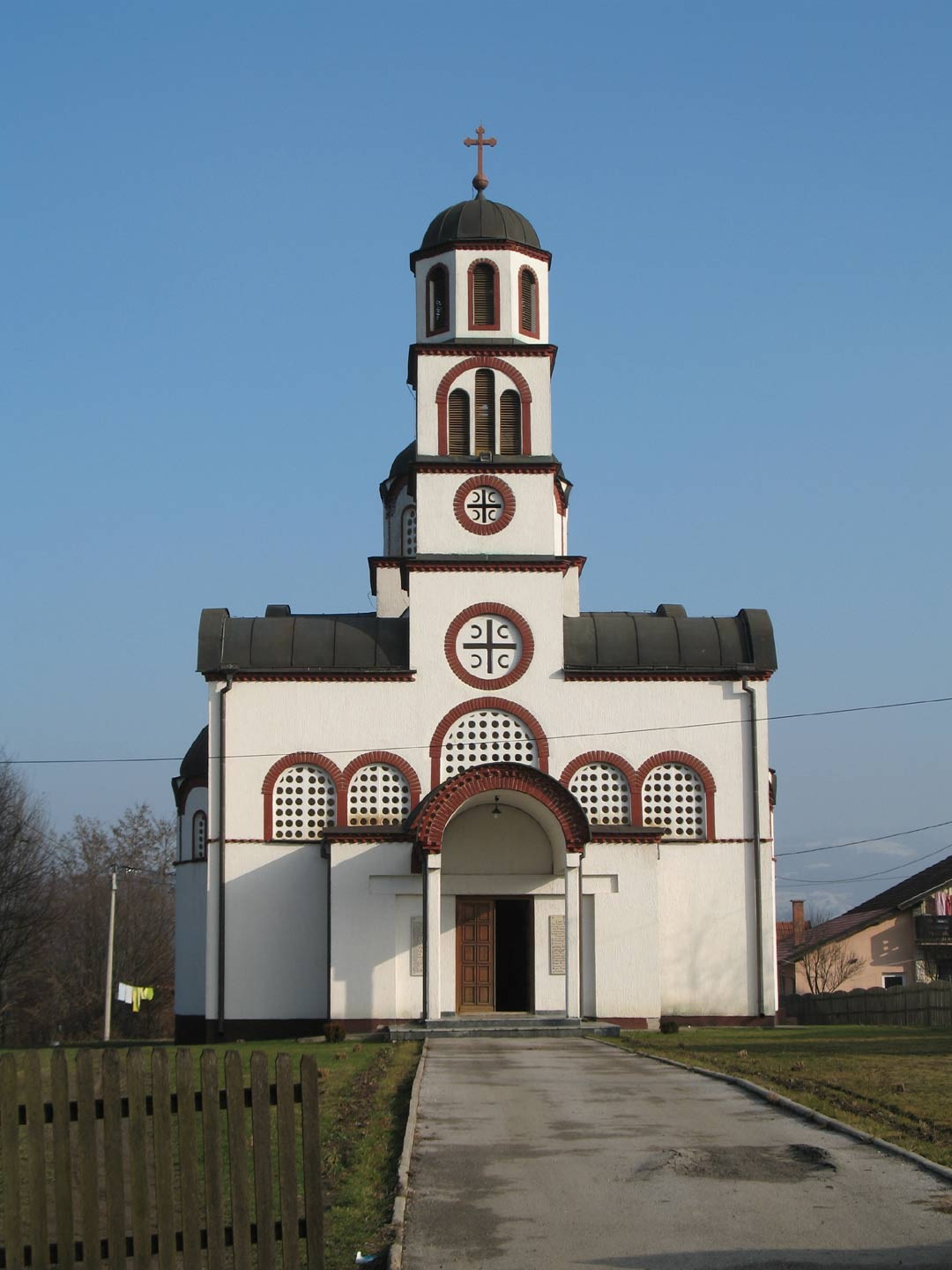
Serbian Orthodox Holy Trinity church

Petrovo (Serbian Cyrillic: Петрово) is a town and municipality located in Republika Srpska, Bosnia and Herzegovina. As of 2013, the town has a population of 2,322 inhabitants, while the municipality has 6,474 inhabitants.

The municipality was formed from parts of the pre-war municipalities of Gračanica and Lukavac (the other parts of the pre-war municipalities are now in the other Bosnian entity of Federation of Bosnia and Herzegovina).

== Geography ==
The municipality is close to Doboj, halfway between Doboj and Tuzla. It is located on the mountain of Ozren.

== History ==
The municipality was formed by Bosnian Serb authorities during the war. The Bosnian government never recognised this decision and officially municipality was created after the signing of the Dayton Agreement. Bosnian Serb authorities also changed the name of the municipality to Petrovo from Bosansko Petrovo Selo. The municipality existed before, however, it was dismantled in the 1960s. It belonged to Gračanica and Lukavac as well.

== Demographics ==
=== Population ===
Population of settlements – Petrovo municipality
	Settlement	1971.	1981.	1991.	2013.
	Total			9,150	6,474
1	Kakmuž			2,398	1,691
2	Karanovac			1,178	1,088
3	Petrovo	2,333	2,606	2,919	2,322
4	Porječina			819	491
5	Sočkovac			1,121	768

=== Ethnic composition ===
Ethnic composition – Petrovo town
	2013.	1991.	1981.	1971.
Total	2,322 (100,0%)	2,919 (100,0%)	2,856 (100,0%)	2,514 (100,0%)
Serbs		2,695 (92,33%)	2,606 (91,25%)	2,333 (92,80%)
Others		82 (2,809%)	28 (0,980%)	12 (0,477%)
Yugoslavs		70 (2,398%)	138 (4,832%)	27 (1,074%)
Bosniaks		54 (1,850%)	59 (2,066%)	91 (3,620%)
Croats		18 (0,617%)	12 (0,420%)	33 (1,313%)
Montenegrins			6 (0,210%)	7 (0,278%)
Macedonians			4 (0,140%)	1 (0,040%)
Slovenes			1 (0,035%)	4 (0,159%)
Albanians			1 (0,035%)	1 (0,040%)
Hungarians			1 (0,035%)	5 (0,199%)

Ethnic composition – Petrovo municipality
	2013.	1991.
Total	6,474 (100,0%)	9,150 (100,0%)
Serbs	6,371 (98,41%)	
Others	60 (0,927%)	
Croats	36 (0,556%)	
Bosniaks	7 (0,108%)	

== Settlements ==
The following villages are constituents of Petrovo municipality:

- Petrovo
- Kakmuž
- Sočkovac
- Karanovac
- Krtova
- Porječina

== Culture ==
The "Saint Nikola Monastery" of the Serbian Orthodox Church is located in the Petrovo municipality.

== Twin municipalities – Sister municipalities ==
- Borovo, Croatia

== See also ==
- Municipalities of Republika Srpska
