= Donja Lohinja =

- Village
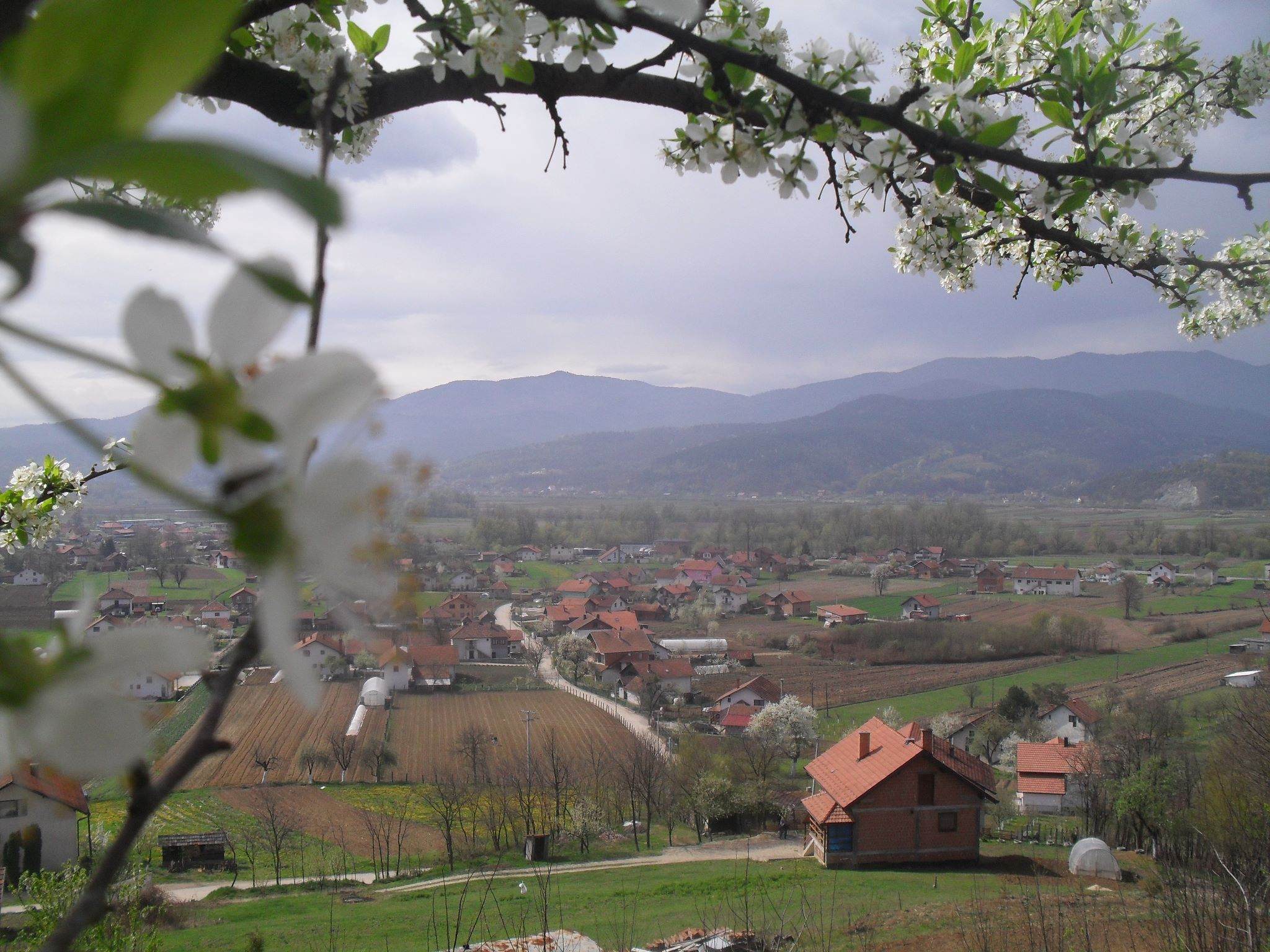
- Donja Lohinja- Smajilbašići

- Location within Bosnia and Herzegovina
- Country: Bosnia and Herzegovina
- Entity: Federation of Bosnia and Herzegovina
- Canton: Tuzla
- Municipality: Gračanica

Area
  - Total: 2.80 sq mi (7.24 km^{2})

Population (2013)
  - Total: 1,149
  - Density: 411/sq mi (159/km^{2})
- Time zone: UTC+1 (CET)
  - Summer (DST): UTC+2 (CEST)

Donja Lohinja is a village in the municipality of Gračanica, Bosnia and Herzegovina.

== Demographics ==
According to the 2013 census, its population was 1,149.

Ethnicity in 2013
Ethnicity	Number	Percentage
Bosniaks	1,112	96.8%
Serbs	8	0.7%
Croats	3	0.3%
other/undeclared	26	2.3%
Total	1,149	100%
