= Arminka Helic =

British politician (born 1968)

The Right Honourable The Baroness Helic
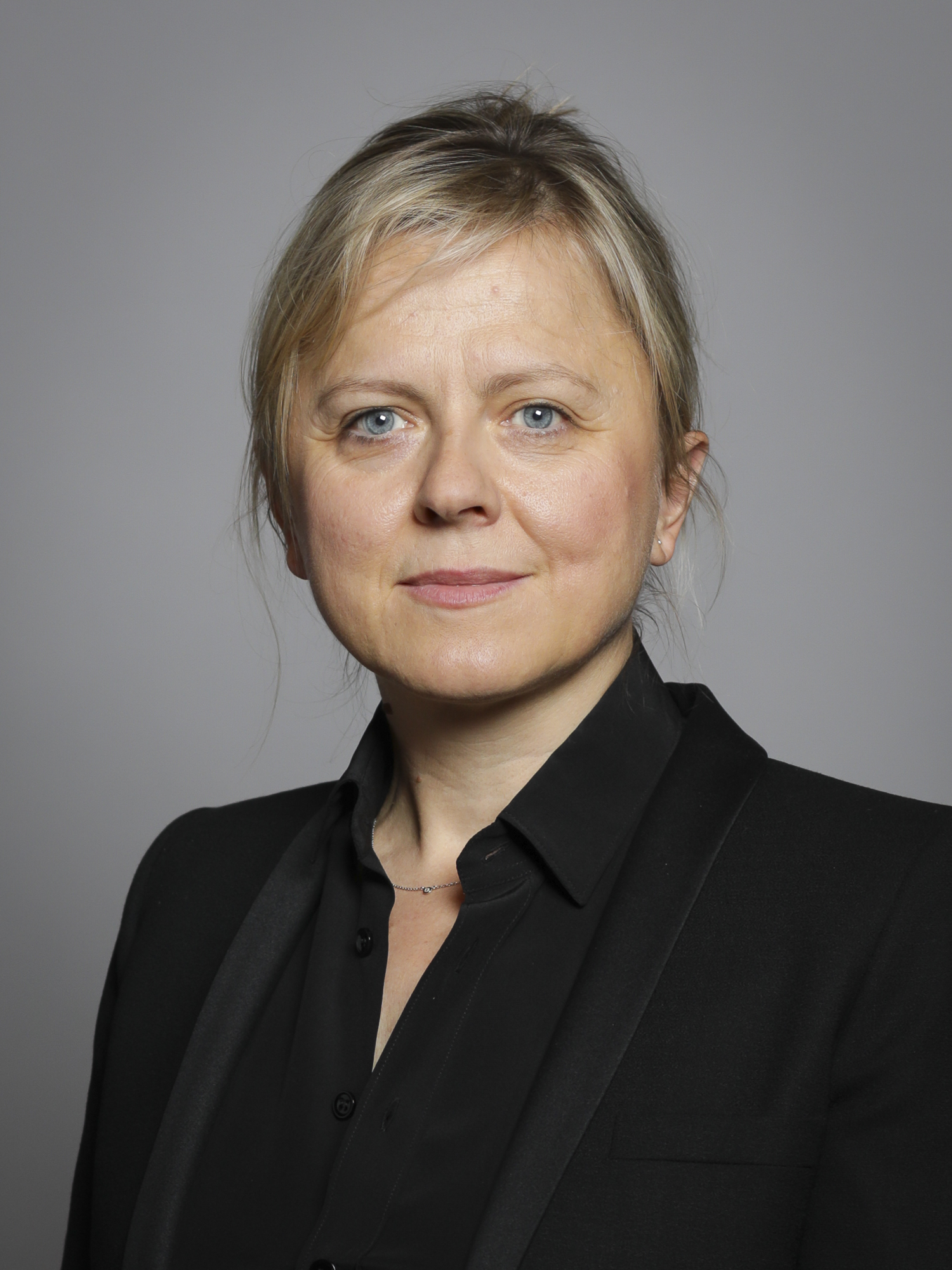
- Official portrait, 2019

Member of the House of Lords
- Lord Temporal
- Life peerage 18 September 2014

Personal details
- Born: Arminka Helić; 20 April 1968 (age 58) Gračanica, Bosnia and Herzegovina, SFR Yugoslavia
- Party: Conservative

Arminka Helic, Baroness Helic (Bosnian: Helić; born 20 April 1968), is a British Conservative politician and life peer from Bosnia and Herzegovina who served as a special adviser to Foreign Secretary William Hague.

Helic was nominated to the House of Lords by David Cameron and was created a life peer on 18 September 2014 as Baroness Helic, of Millbank in the City of Westminster. She was introduced to the House of Lords on 24 November 2014.

== Early life ==
Helic was born in Gračanica, SFR Yugoslavia.

== Foreign policy adviser ==
Helic is a Bosnia and Herzegovina foreign policy expert who became a Conservative Party adviser after fleeing the Yugoslav wars in the 1990s. She has advised numerous Conservatives in opposition and government from 1998 onwards, and was described by Matthew D'Ancona as "one of the most impressive foreign policy experts in the Government". Known for her discretion, there is little in the public domain on her personal views, although she is pro-American. According to a leaked dispatch from Richard LeBaron, Deputy Head of the US Mission in London, she shares William Hague's pronounced pro-U.S. views and described the United States as "the essential country."

== Global Sexual Violence Initiative ==
Helic is credited with persuading UK Foreign Secretary William Hague to launch the UK's Global Sexual Violence Initiative. Hague worked with Angelina Jolie to draw attention to the issue at a four-day summit in 2014. In October 2017, Helic was named as one of London's most influential figures for her refugee work.

== Trust Fund for Victims ==
In November 2015, Helic was elected to the Board of the Trust Fund for Victims as the representative of Western European Countries and Other States. The Trust, established under the auspices of the Rome Statute of the International Criminal Court, encourages restorative justice through the provision of assistance to victims of crimes that fall within the Court's jurisdiction.

== Parliamentary work ==
In May 2016, Helic was appointed to the House of Lords International Relations Committee.
