= Stjepan Polje =

Stjepan Polje Стјепан Поље
- Village
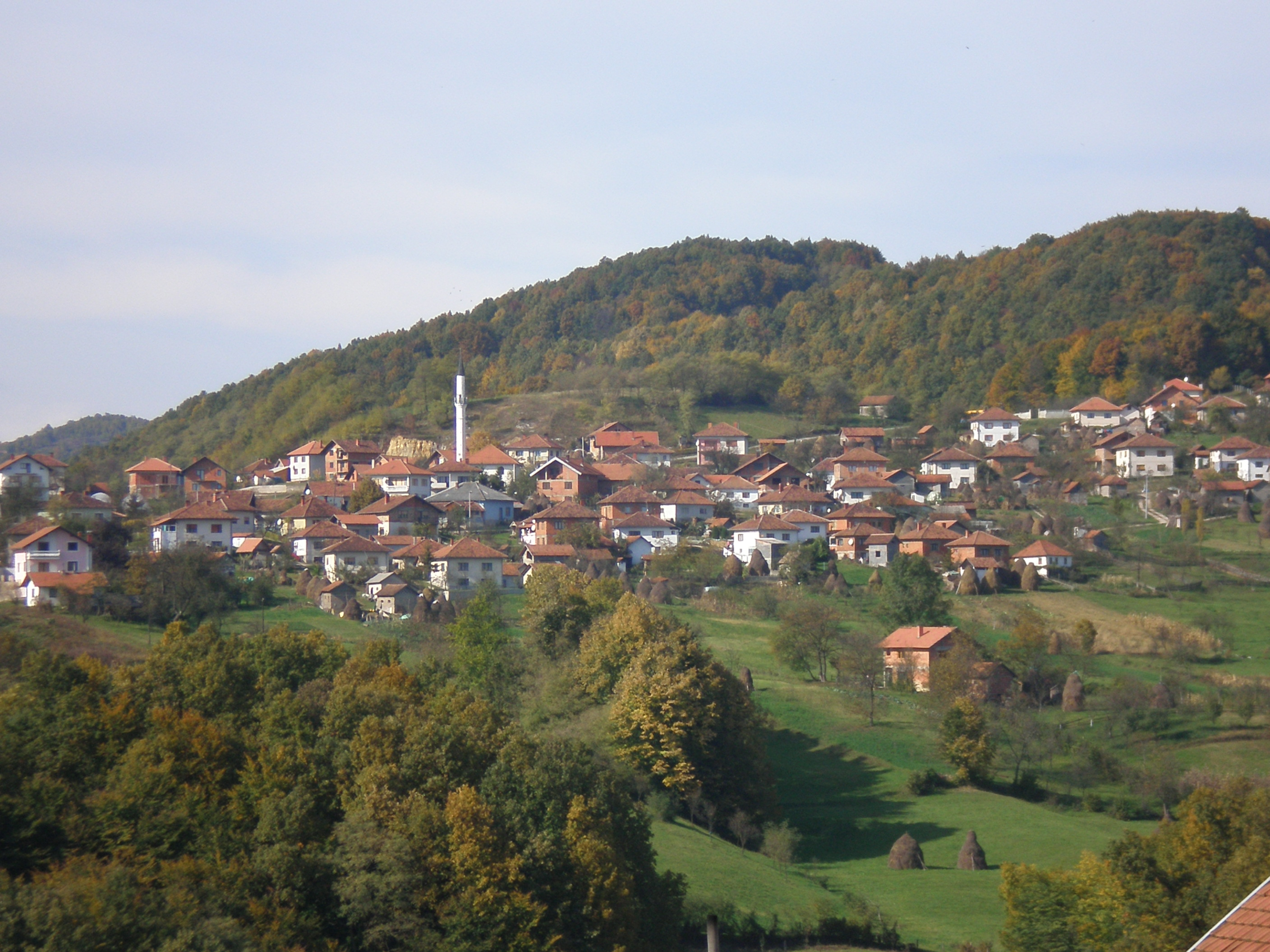

- Location within Bosnia and Herzegovina
- Coordinates: 44°43′02″N 18°15′34″E
- Country: Bosnia and Herzegovina
- Entity: Federation of Bosnia and Herzegovina
- Canton: Tuzla
- Municipality: Gračanica

Area
  - Total: 4.20 sq mi (10.88 km^{2})

Population (2013)
  - Total: 3,466
  - Density: 825.1/sq mi (318.6/km^{2})
- Time zone: UTC+1 (CET)
  - Summer (DST): UTC+2 (CEST)

Stjepan Polje (Cyrillic: Стјепан Поље) is a village in the municipality of Gračanica, Bosnia and Herzegovina.

== Demographics ==
According to the 2013 census, its population was 3,466.

Ethnicity in 2013
Ethnicity	Number	Percentage
Bosniaks	3,448	99.5%
Serbs	3	0.1%
other/undeclared	15	0.4%
Total	3,466	100%
