= Škahovica =

- Village
- Location within Bosnia and Herzegovina
- Country: Bosnia and Herzegovina
- Entity: Federation of Bosnia and Herzegovina
- Canton: Tuzla
- Municipality: Gračanica

Area
  - Total: 3.13 sq mi (8.11 km^{2})

Population (2013)
  - Total: 1,400
  - Density: 450/sq mi (170/km^{2})
- Time zone: UTC+1 (CET)
  - Summer (DST): UTC+2 (CEST)

Škahovica is a village in the municipality of Gračanica, Bosnia and Herzegovina.

== Demographics ==
According to the 2013 census, its population was 1,400.

Ethnicity in 2013
Ethnicity	Number	Percentage
Bosniaks	1,281	91.5%
other/undeclared	119	8.5%
Total	1,400	100%
