= Gornja Lohinja =

- Village
- Location within Bosnia and Herzegovina
- Country: Bosnia and Herzegovina
- Entity: Federation of Bosnia and Herzegovina
- Canton: Tuzla
- Municipality: Gračanica

Area
  - Total: 4.14 sq mi (10.73 km^{2})

Population (2013)
  - Total: 146
  - Density: 35.2/sq mi (13.6/km^{2})
- Time zone: UTC+1 (CET)
  - Summer (DST): UTC+2 (CEST)

Gornja Lohinja is a village in the municipality of Gračanica, Bosnia and Herzegovina.

== Demographics ==
According to the 2013 census, its population was 146.

Ethnicity in 2013
Ethnicity	Number	Percentage
Bosniaks	135	92.5%
Serbs	5	3.4%
other/undeclared	6	4.1%
Total	146	100%
