= Piskavica (Gračanica) =

- Village
- Location within Bosnia and Herzegovina
- Country: Bosnia and Herzegovina
- Entity: Federation of Bosnia and Herzegovina
- Canton: Tuzla
- Municipality: Gračanica

Area
  - Total: 2.17 sq mi (5.62 km^{2})

Population (2013)
  - Total: 720
  - Density: 330/sq mi (130/km^{2})
- Time zone: UTC+1 (CET)
  - Summer (DST): UTC+2 (CEST)

Piskavica is a village in the municipality of Gračanica, Bosnia and Herzegovina.

== Demographics ==
According to the 2013 census, its population was 720.

Ethnicity in 2013
Ethnicity	Number	Percentage
Bosniaks	707	98.2%
other/undeclared	13	1.8%
Total	720	100%
