= Sočkovac =

Coordinates: 44.69°N 18.27°E

Sočkovac Сочковац
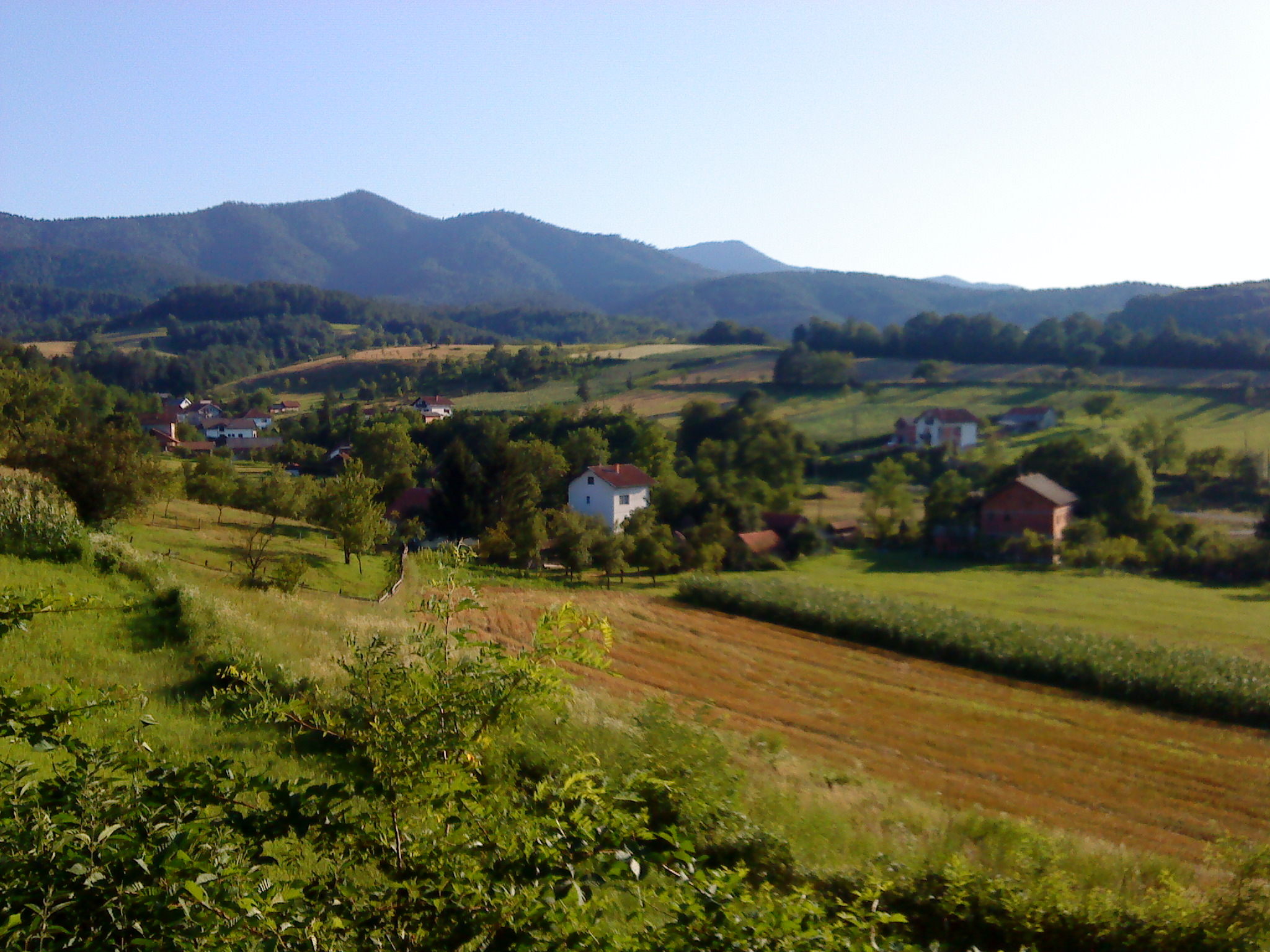
- Village View of Mt Ozren from Sočkovac

- Location of Petrovo within Bosnia and Herzegovina
- Country: Bosnia and Herzegovina
- Entity: Republika Srpska
- Municipality: Petrovo

Population (1991)
  - Total: 1,112

Ethnicity
  - Serbs: 95%
- Time zone: UTC+1 (CET)
  - Summer (DST): UTC+2 (CEST)
- Area code: 53

Sočkovac (Serbian Cyrillic: Сочковац) is a village located in Petrovo municipality, northern Bosnia and Herzegovina. It is geographically located in the Bosnia region and it politically belongs to Republika Srpska.

== History ==
Sočkovac historically belongs to Gračanica municipality. After the war Gračanica was divided and belongs to the Federation of Bosnia and Herzegovina, the rest of pre-war municipality belongs to Republika Srpska, and Bosansko Petrovo Selo, a settlement in the past belonged to Gračanica, became the new administration centre.
