= Center for Democracy and Transitional Justice =

Bosnian non-governmental organization

- Formation: 2011; 15 years ago
- Type: Non-governmental organization
- Headquarters: Banja Luka, Bosnia and Herzegovina
- Region served: Bosnia and Herzegovina
- Services: Human rights
- CEO: Zlatica Gruhonjić
- Affiliations: RECOM Reconciliation Network (2011–)
- Website: www.cdtp.org

Center for Democracy and Transitional Justice (Serbian: Centar za demokratiju i tranzicionu pravdu/ Центар за демократију и транзициону правду) or CDTJ, is a Bosnian non-governmental organization for human rights and international humanitarian law. The CEO is Zlatica Gruhonjić.
