= Lendići (Gračanica) =

Lendići Лендићи
- Village
- Location within Bosnia and Herzegovina
- Coordinates: 44°42′48″N 18°17′10″E
- Country: Bosnia and Herzegovina
- Entity: Federation of Bosnia and Herzegovina
- Canton: Tuzla
- Municipality: Gračanica

Area
  - Total: 1.05 sq mi (2.73 km^{2})

Population (2013)
  - Total: 237
  - Density: 225/sq mi (86.8/km^{2})
- Time zone: UTC+1 (CET)
  - Summer (DST): UTC+2 (CEST)

Lendići (Cyrillic: Лендићи) is a village in the municipality of Gračanica, Bosnia and Herzegovina.

== Demographics ==
According to the 2013 census, its population was 237.

Ethnicity in 2013
Ethnicity	Number	Percentage
Bosniaks	226	95.4%
Croats	1	0.4%
other/undeclared	10	4.2%
Total	237	100%
