= Porječina =

Porječina Порјечина
- Village
- Location within Bosnia and Herzegovina
- Coordinates: 44°36′N 18°23′E
- Country: Bosnia and Herzegovina
- Entity: Republika Srpska
- Municipality: Petrovo
- Time zone: UTC+1 (CET)
  - Summer (DST): UTC+2 (CEST)

Porječina (Serbian: Порјечина) is a village in the municipality of Petrovo, Bosnia and Herzegovina.
