= Malešići (Gračanica) =

Malešići Малешићи
- Village
- Location within Bosnia and Herzegovina
- Coordinates: 44°44′17″N 18°16′26″E
- Country: Bosnia and Herzegovina
- Entity: Federation of Bosnia and Herzegovina
- Canton: Tuzla
- Municipality: Gračanica

Area
  - Total: 4.50 sq mi (11.66 km^{2})

Population (2013)
  - Total: 2,853
  - Density: 633.7/sq mi (244.7/km^{2})
- Time zone: UTC+1 (CET)
  - Summer (DST): UTC+2 (CEST)

Malešići (Cyrillic: Малешићи) is a village in the municipality of Gračanica, Bosnia and Herzegovina.

== Demographics ==
According to the 2013 census, its population was 2,853.

Ethnicity in 2013
Ethnicity	Number	Percentage
Bosniaks	2,839	99.3%
other/undeclared	14	0.6%
Total	2,853	100%
