= Fuku Shidoin =

Fuku Shidōin (副指導員) is a Japanese title, often used in Japanese martial arts.

== Meaning ==
The word means „assisting instructor“ or „assisting teacher“ and is usually used as an honorific title to designate an official inexperienced instructor within an organization. An intermediate level instructor would have the title Shidōin and a senior instructor would have the title Shihan.

== Origin ==
Fuku (副) is set as a suffix in front of the title and means deputy, representative, supporting or vice. The word Shidōin (指導員) descends from Shido (suru) 指導 (する). It consists of yubi 指 which means finger or sasu 指す which is the verb for showing. Michibiku 導 means guide or lead. Shido also stands for chivalry, the code of honor of the samurai.

== Use ==
Fuku Shidōin is the lowest of three honorary title. One level above is Shidōin, „instructor“ or „teacher“.

Different budo arts and dojos have several requirements for the usage of this title, but in general it corresponds to 2nd or 3rd Dan. Fuku Shidōin is used to specify the general title sensei.

A senior instructor would have the title Shihan.

== See also ==
- Japanese honorifics
