= Orahovica Donja =

- Village
- Location within Bosnia and Herzegovina
- Coordinates: 44°39′N 18°22′E
- Country: Bosnia and Herzegovina
- Entity: Federation of Bosnia and Herzegovina
- Canton: Tuzla
- Municipality: Gračanica

Area
  - Total: 5.80 sq mi (15.01 km^{2})

Population (2013)
  - Total: 3,966
  - Density: 684.3/sq mi (264.2/km^{2})
- Time zone: UTC+1 (CET)
  - Summer (DST): UTC+2 (CEST)

Orahovica Donja is a village in the municipality of Gračanica, Bosnia and Herzegovina.

== Demographics ==
According to the 2013 census, its population was 3,966.

Ethnicity in 2013
Ethnicity	Number	Percentage
Bosniaks	3,893	98.2%
Croats	5	0.1%
Serbs	2	0.1%
other/undeclared	66	1.7%
Total	3,966	100%
