= Rašljeva =

- Village
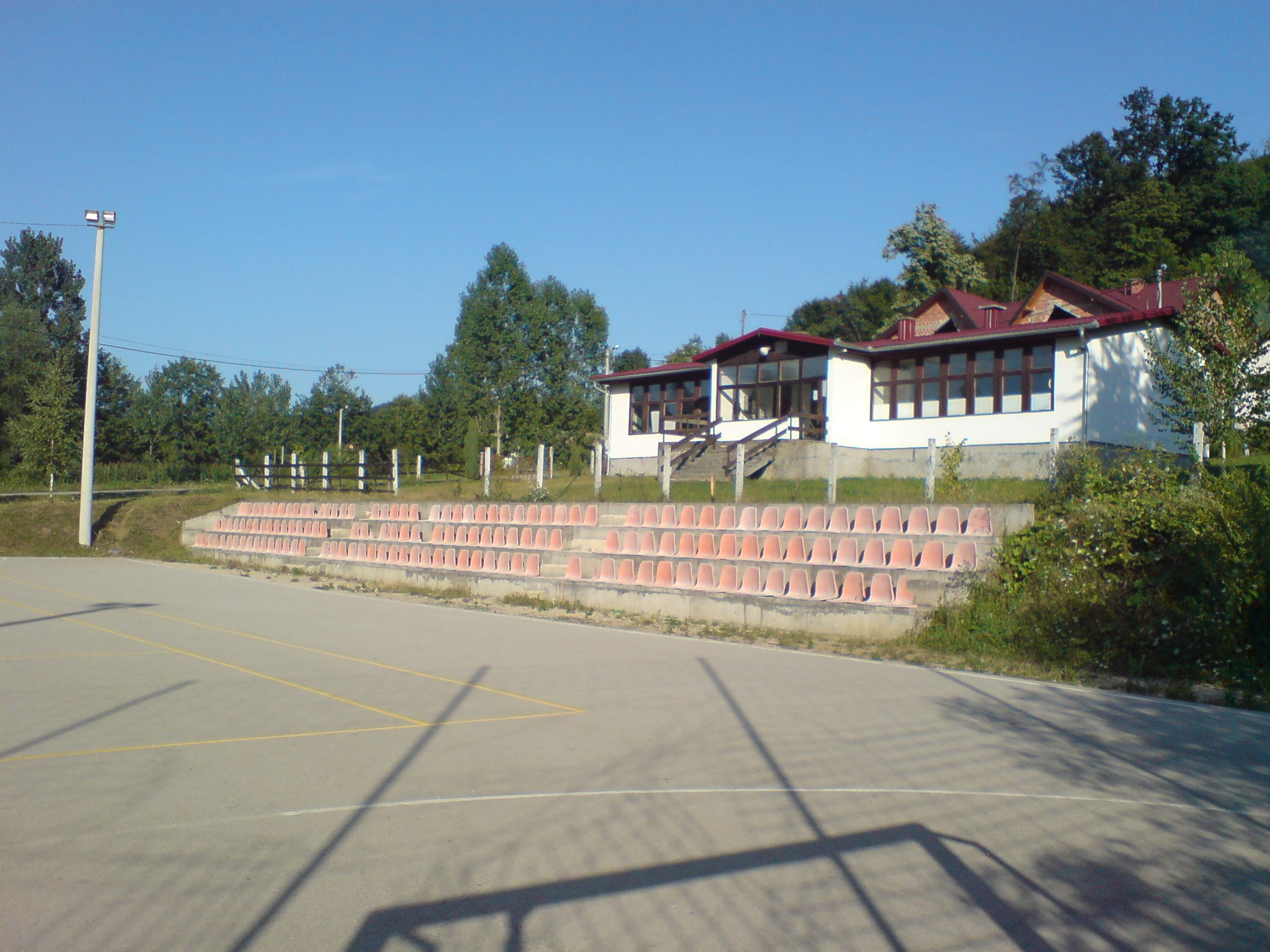

- Location within Bosnia and Herzegovina
- Country: Bosnia and Herzegovina
- Entity: Federation of Bosnia and Herzegovina
- Canton: Tuzla
- Municipality: Gračanica

Area
  - Total: 2.79 sq mi (7.23 km^{2})

Population (2013)
  - Total: 691
  - Density: 248/sq mi (95.6/km^{2})
- Time zone: UTC+1 (CET)
  - Summer (DST): UTC+2 (CEST)

Rašljeva is a village in the municipality of Gračanica, Bosnia and Herzegovina.

== Demographics ==
According to the 2013 census, its population was 691.

Ethnicity in 2013
Ethnicity	Number	Percentage
Bosniaks	677	98.0%
Croats	1	0.1%
other/undeclared	13	1.9%
Total	691	100%
