= Babići (Gračanica) =

- Village
- Location within Bosnia and Herzegovina
- Coordinates: 44.7406°N 18.2883°E
- Country: Bosnia and Herzegovina
- Entity: Federation of Bosnia and Herzegovina
- Canton: Tuzla
- Municipality: Gračanica

Area
  - Total: 3.14 sq mi (8.13 km^{2})

Population (2013)
  - Total: 1,897
  - Density: 604/sq mi (233/km^{2})
- Time zone: UTC+1 (CET)
  - Summer (DST): UTC+2 (CEST)

Babići is a village in the municipality of Gračanica, Bosnia and Herzegovina.

== Demographics ==
According to the 2013 census, its population was 1,897.

Ethnicity in 2013
| Ethnicity | Number | Percentage |
|---|---|---|
| Bosniaks | 1,884 | 99.3% |
| Croats | 1 | 0.1% |
| other/undeclared | 12 | 0.6% |
| Total | 1,897 | 100% |
