= Shidōin =

Shidōin (指導員:しどういん) is a Japanese title, often used in Japanese martial arts.

== Meaning ==
The word Shidōin means "instructor" or "teacher" and is typically used as an honorific title to identify an intermediate level instructor within an organization or budo dojo. By comparison, an assistant instructor or teacher would have the title Fuku Shidoin, while a senior instructor would have the title Shihan, meaning "leader", "guide" or "ideal".

== Origin ==
The word descends from Shido (suru) 指導 (する). It consists of yubi 指 what means finger or sasu 指す which is the verb for showing. Michibiku 導 means guide or lead.

== Use ==
Different budo arts and dojos have their own requirements for how this title is used, but typically it corresponds to 4th or 5th Dan.

== See also ==
- Japanese honorifics
