= Gračanica, Bosnia and Herzegovina =

Gračanica Грачаница
- City
- Grad Gračanica; Град Грачаница; City of Gračanica
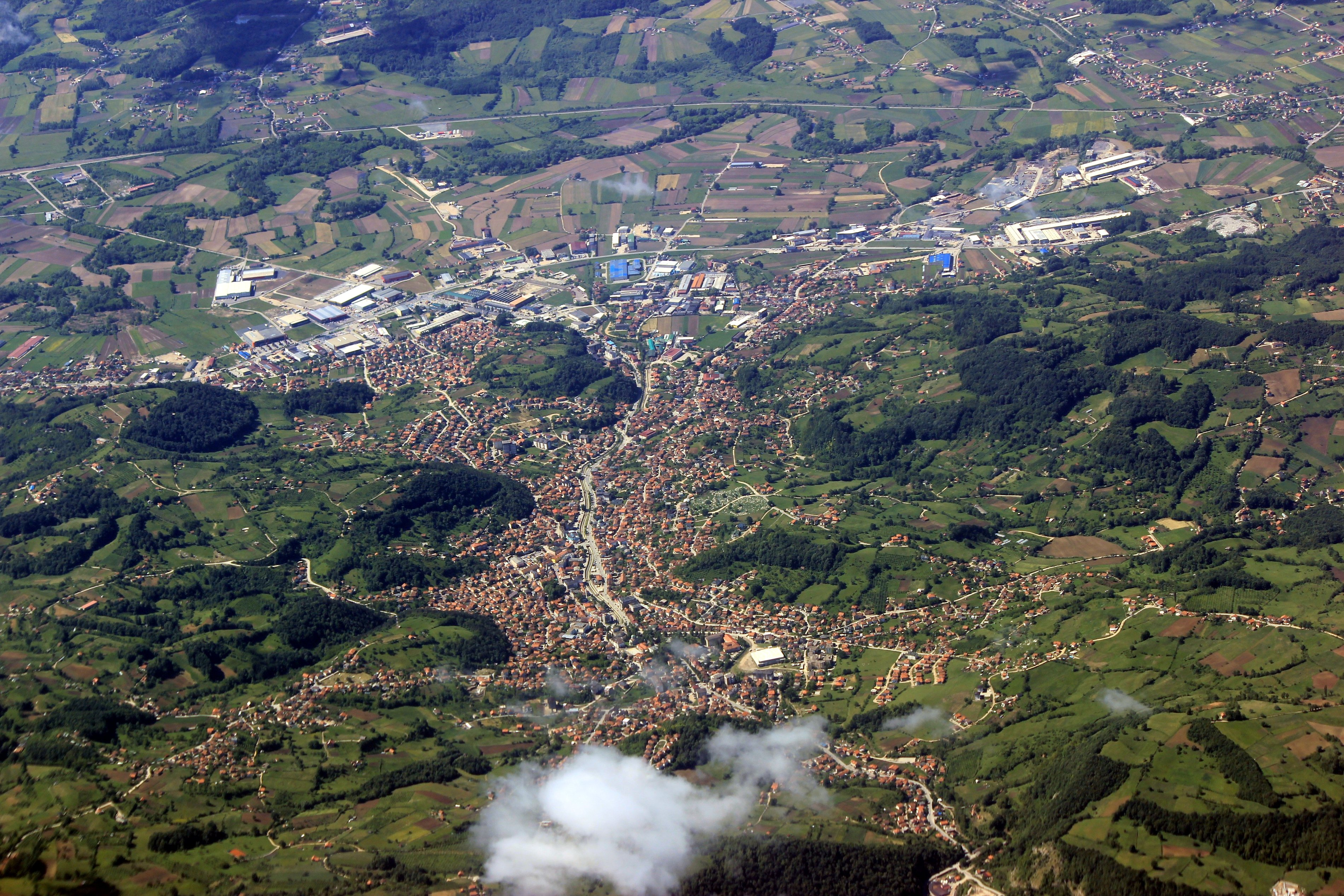

- Coat of arms

- Location of Gračanica within Bosnia and Herzegovina.
- Coordinates: 44°41′21″N 18°18′08″E
- Country: Bosnia and Herzegovina
- Entity: Federation of Bosnia and Herzegovina
- Canton: Tuzla

Government
  - Mayor: Sadmir Džebo (SDA)

Area
  - City: 216 km^{2} (83 sq mi)

Population (2013 census)
  - City: 45,220
  - Density: 209/km^{2} (542/sq mi)
  - Urban: 13,400
- Time zone: UTC+1 (CET)
  - Summer (DST): UTC+2 (CEST)
- Postal code: 75320
- Area code: +387 35
- Website: www.gracanica.gov.ba

Gračanica (Cyrillic: Грачаница) is a city located in Tuzla Canton of the Federation of Bosnia and Herzegovina, an entity of Bosnia and Herzegovina. It is one of the most developed cities in Bosnia and Herzegovina.

== History ==
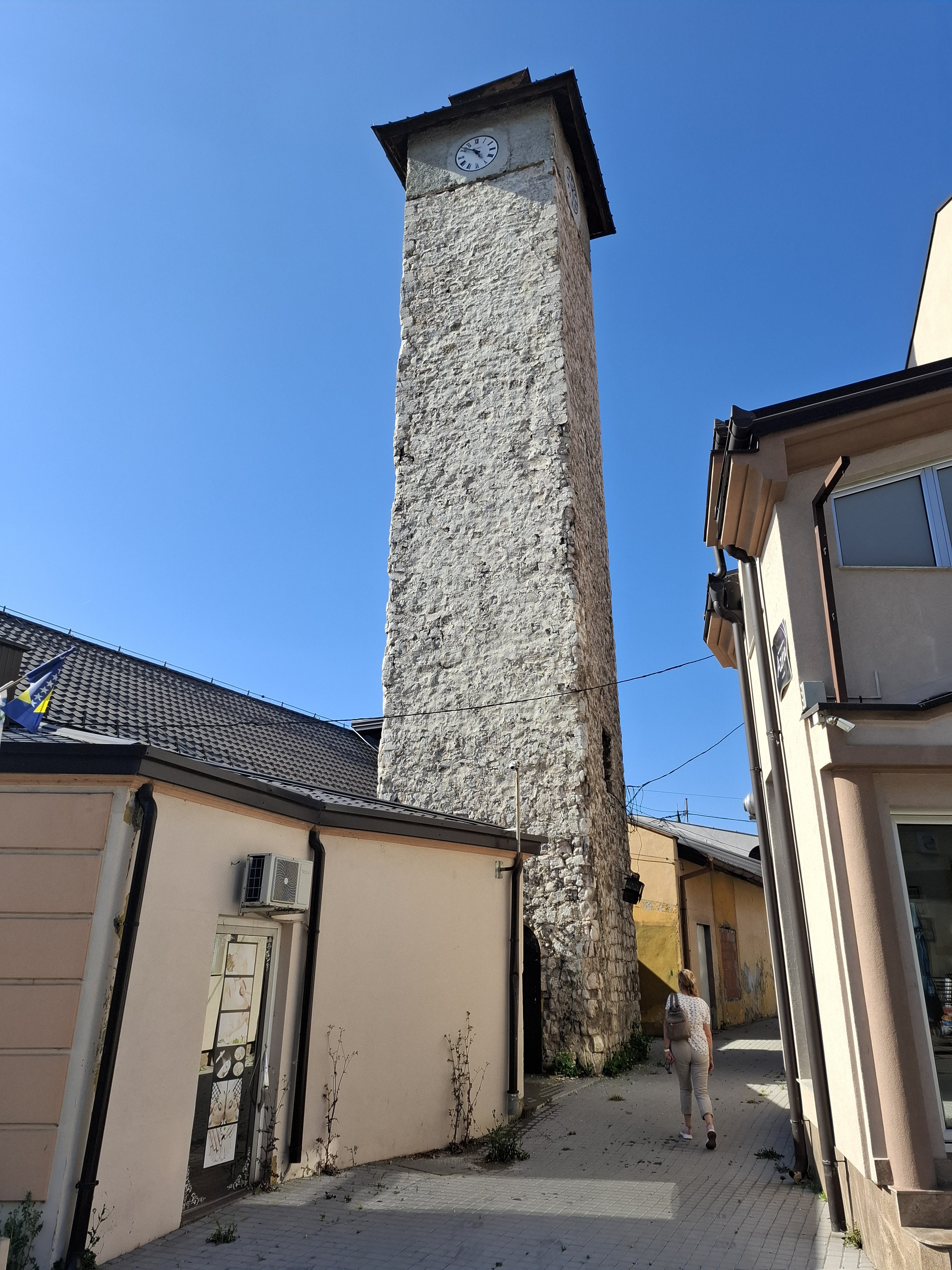
The clock tower in Gračanica from the Ottoman period.

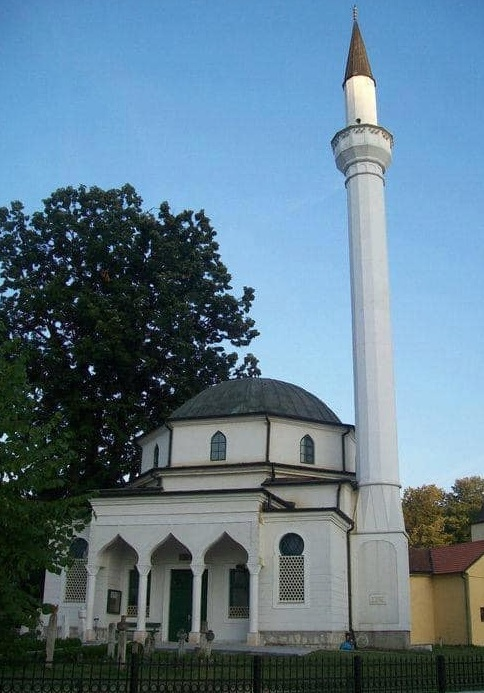
White Mosque in Gračanica

Gračanica is located in northeastern Bosnia and Herzegovina, east of Doboj and west of Tuzla. As of 2013, it has a population of 45,220 inhabitants. It is located in the lower valley of the River Sokoluša along the main road from Tuzla to Doboj, about 50 km west of Tuzla.

The earliest documented references to Gračanica date back to 1528 in Ottoman archives, where it was identified for its iron mine. Approximately 4 km (2.5 mi) from the town, a medieval fortress named Sokol existed. Gračanica attained town status in 1548. During the 17th century, it underwent expansion facilitated by Ahmed-paša Budimlija, who constructed the White Mosque, a public bath, and a clock tower. Under the Austrian Empire, Gračanica witnessed substantial economic, urban, and cultural advancements. At the beginning of the 20th century, there were 11 mosques, an Orthodox and a Catholic church and a Jewish temple (synagogue) in Gračanica, which testifies to the multi-ethnicity and multi-confessional nature of this city.

From 1929 to 1941, Gračanica was part of the Vrbas Banovina within the Kingdom of Yugoslavia. Today is part of the Tuzla Canton in the Federation of Bosnia and Herzegovina, an entity of the Bosnia and Herzegovina.

The local football club is Bratstvo that plays in the first League of the Federation of Bosnia and Herzegovina. Hanball Club Gračanica is a handball club from the Gračanica that competes in the National Championship of Bosnia and Herzegovina.

== Climate ==
In January, the average temperature is 1.8 °C (35.2 °F), while in July, it rises to 23.3 °C (73.9 °F). This region is known for its limited precipitation, with an annual average of 830mm/m2. The highest precipitation occurs in May (121mm) and June (101mm), while March records the lowest (41mm). Snowfall is most frequent in January, February, and March, with an average of 50 days per year. Gračanica exhibits a continental climate type.

== Settlements ==
The City of Gračanica consists of 23 settlements: Babići, Doborovci, Donja Lohinja, Džakule, Gornja Lohinja, Gračanica, Lendići, Lukavica, Malešići, Miričina, Orahovica Donja, Orahovica Gornja, Piskavica, Pribava, Prijeko Brdo, Rašljeva, Skipovac Donji, Skipovac Gornji, Sočkovac, Soko, Stjepan Polje, Škahovica, Vranovići.

== Notable people ==
- Ibrahim Ustavdić, educator
- Branko Cvetković, basketball player
- Muhamed Konjić, football player
- Arminka Helić, politician
- Mitar Lukić, football player
- Vedin Musić, football player
- Husein Mujić, Grand Mufti of Yugoslavia (1987-1989)
- Edvin Kanka Ćudić, human rights activist – lived in Gračanica as a child, having moved to the town at the age of three

== Twin towns – sister cities ==
Gračanica is twinned with:

- Fleury-les-Aubrais, France
- Formia, Italy
- Pljevlja, Montenegro

== Demographics ==
=== Ethnic composition ===
Ethnic composition
	2013.	1991.	1981.	1971.	1961.
Total	45,220 (100,0%)	59,134 (100,0%)	54,311 (100,0%)	46,950 (100,0%)	30,203 (100,0%)
Bosniaks	43,857 (96,99%)	42,599 (72,04%)	38,189 (70,32%)	33,135 (70,58%)	20,726 (68,62%)
Others	1,134 (2,508%)	1,315 (2,224%)	288 (0,530%)	219 (0,466%)	77 (0,250%)
Serbs	157 (0,347%)	13,558 (22,93%)	13,226 (24,35%)	13 135 (27,98%)	8,543 (28,29%)
Croats	72 (0,159%)	132 (0,223%)	135 (0,249%)	199 (0,424%)	171 (0,570%)
Yugoslavs		1,530 (2,587%)	2,359 (4,344%)	184 (0,392%)	686 (2,270%)
Montenegrins			50 (0,092%)	45 (0,096%)	
Roma			24 (0,044%)	1 (0,002%)	
Albanians			20 (0,037%)	10 (0,021%)	
Macedonians			13 (0,024%)	9 (0,019%)	
Slovenes			5 (0,009%)	7 (0,015%)	
Hungarians			2 (0,004%)	6 (0,013%)	

== Gallery ==
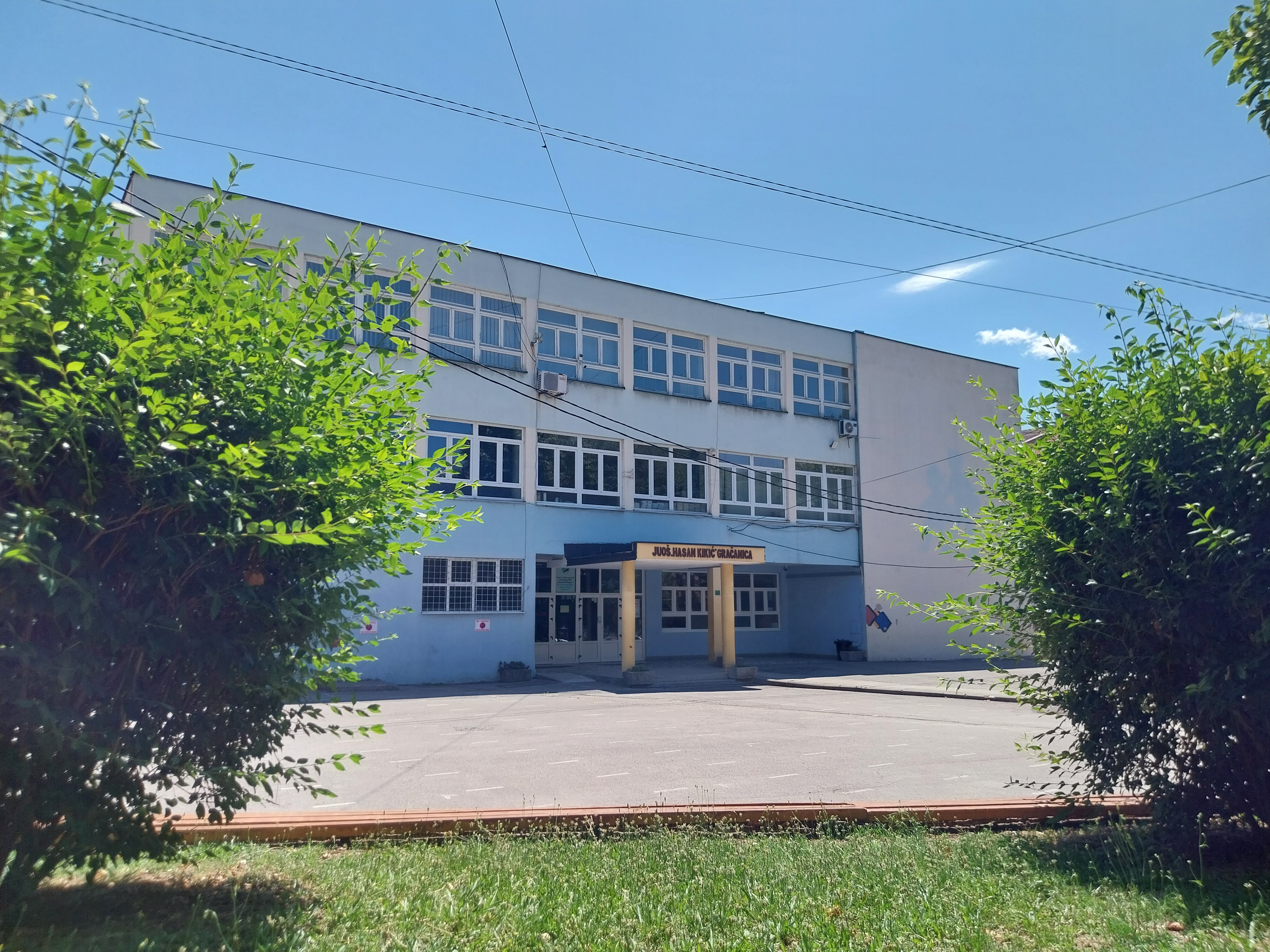
Primary school Hasan Kikić, Gračanica

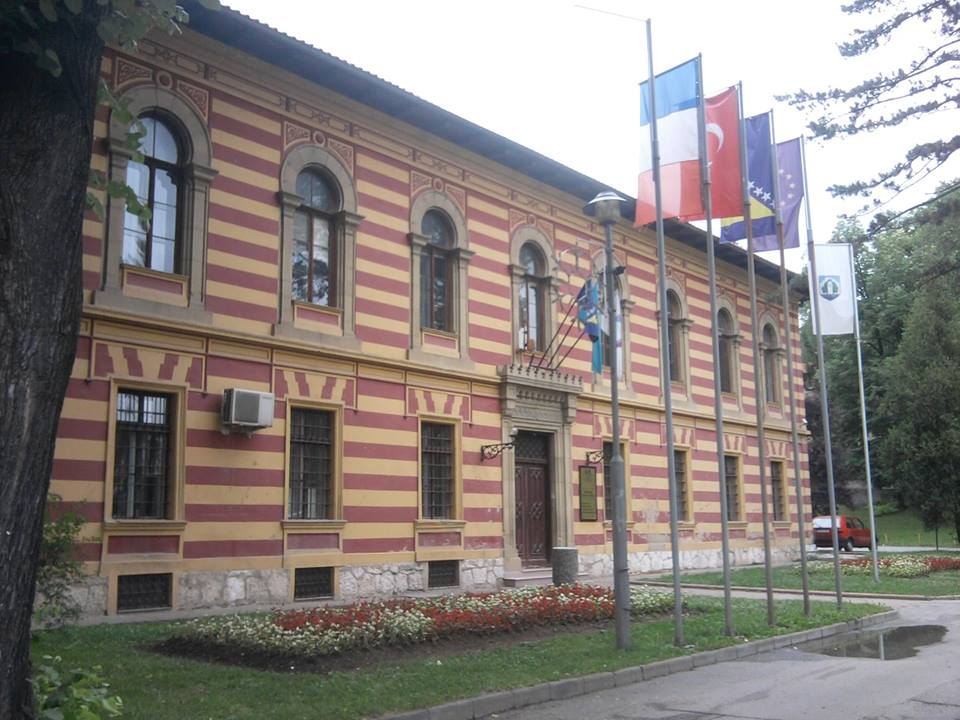
City Hall of the City of Gračanica

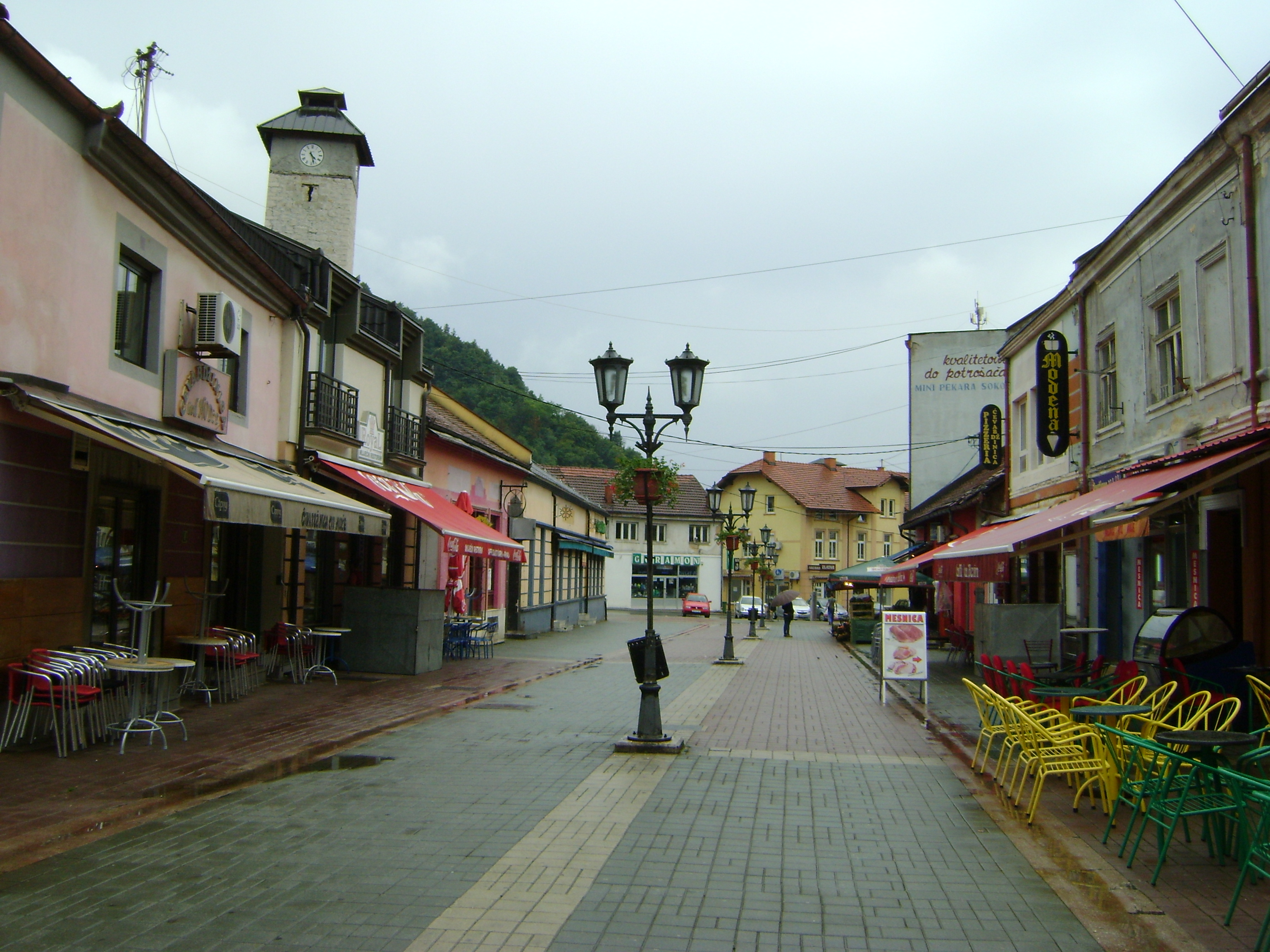
Downtown of Gračanica

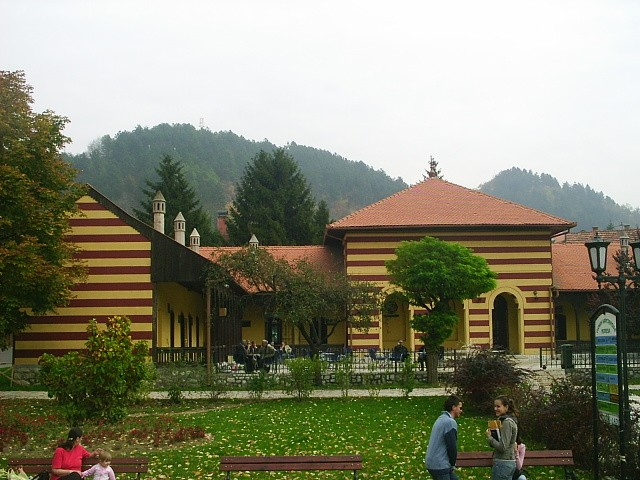
Madrasa of Osman-kapetan in Gračanica

== Literature ==
- Official results from the book: Ethnic composition of Bosnia-Herzegovina population, by municipalities and settlements, 1991. census, Zavod za statistiku Bosne i Hercegovine - Bilten no.234, Sarajevo 1991.
