= Crni Vrh =

Crni Vrh, meaning "black peak" in Bosnian-Croatian-Serbian, may refer to:

== Populated places ==
=== Bosnia and Herzegovina ===
- Crni Vrh (Čelinac), a village in Čelinac Municipality
- Crni Vrh (Glamoč), a village in Glamoč Municipality
- Crni Vrh, Konjic, a village in Konjic Municipality
- Crni Vrh, Sarajevo, a neighborhood in Centar, Sarajevo
- Crni Vrh (Višegrad), a village in Višegrad Municipality

=== Montenegro ===
- Crni Vrh, Berane, a village in Berane Municipality
- Crni Vrh, Pljevlja, a village in Pljevlja Municipality

=== Serbia ===
- Crni Vrh (Knjaževac), a village in Knjaževac Municipality
- Crni Vrh (Medveđa), a village in Medveđa Municipality
- Crni Vrh, Vranje, a village in Vranje Municipality

== Mountains ==
=== Serbia ===
- Crni Vrh (Bor)
- Crni Vrh (Jagodina)
- Crni Vrh (Priboj)

=== Other countries ===
- Crni Vrh (Zvornik), Bosnia and Herzegovina
- Crni Vrh (Brod), Kosovo

== Other ==
- Crni Vrh mass grave, a mass grave on Zvornik's Mount Crni Vrh containing the remains of 629 Bosnian Muslim victims killed by Serbs in the 1990s

== See also ==
- Črni Vrh (disambiguation), Slovenian equivalent
- List of mountains in Serbia, comprehensive list of peaks named "Crni vrh"
