= 2014 Southeast Europe floods =

Natural disaster in Europe

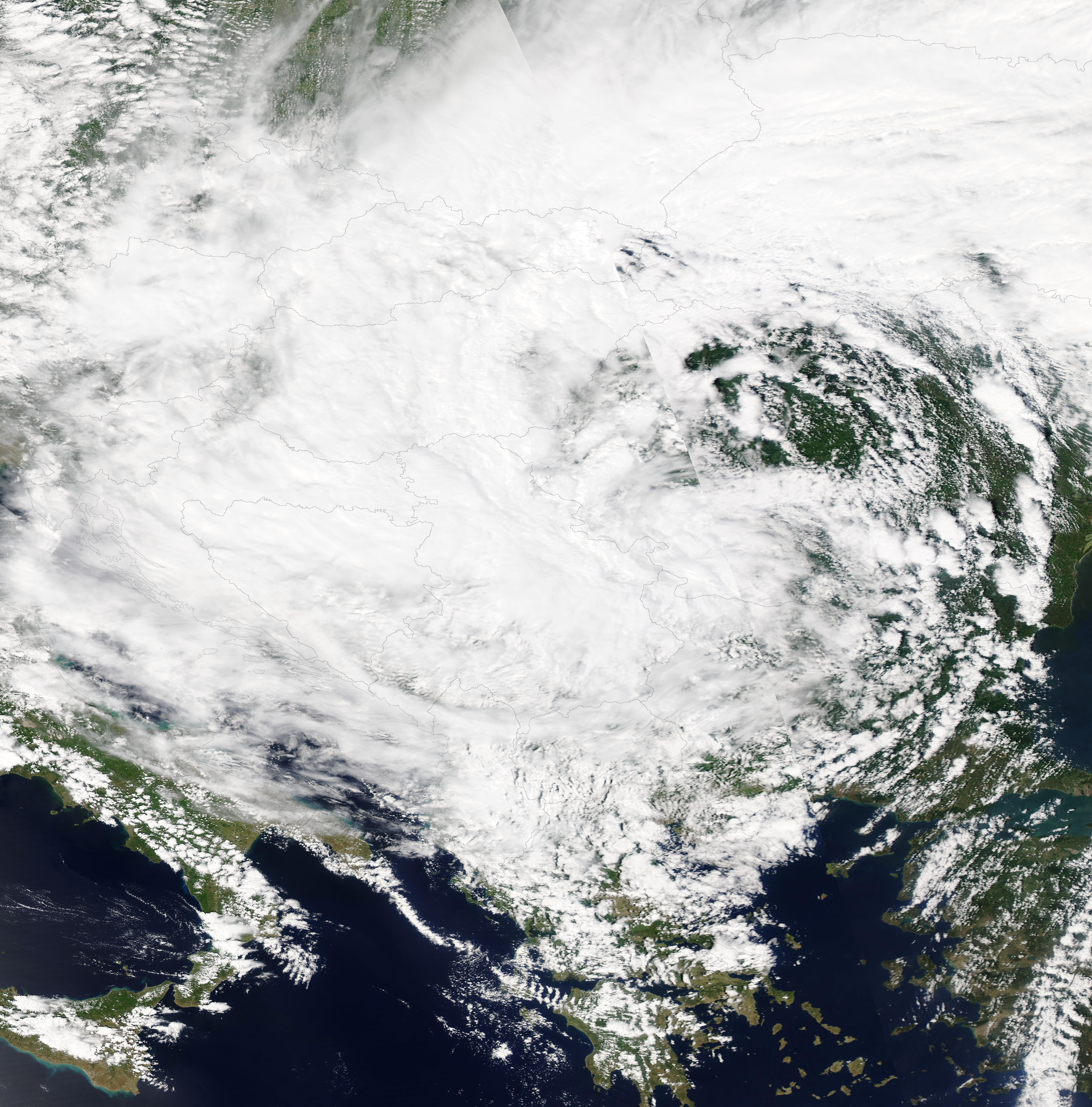
- The Yvette storm in Southeast Europe, 15 May 2014
- Date: 13–27 May 2014
- Location: Serbia Bosnia and Herzegovina Croatia Romania
- Deaths: At least 86 57 in Serbia; 24 in Bosnia and Herzegovina; 2 in Croatia; 2 in Romania; 1 in Slovakia
- Property damage: More than one billion euros

Between 13 and 18 May 2014 a low-pressure cyclone designated Tamara and Yvette affected a large area of Southeastern and Central Europe, causing floods and landslides. Serbia and Bosnia and Herzegovina suffered the greatest damage, as the rain was the heaviest in 120 years of recorded weather measurements. By 20 May, at least 62 people had died as a result of the flooding, and hundreds of thousands had been forced from their homes. Towns of Obrenovac in Serbia and Doboj in Bosnia and Herzegovina account for most victims, after being inundated by several-meter high waters from nearby rivers.

Floodwaters caused over 2,000 landslides across Southeast Europe, spreading damage across many towns and villages. The rains activated torrents and mudslides, and subsequently several rivers in watersheds of Sava and Morava rose and flooded surrounding valleys. Official counts indicate that over 1.6 million people were affected in Serbia and Bosnia, after a week of flooding.

Assessments of the damage range up to €3.5 billion for Serbia, Bosnia and Herzegovina. Damage in Serbia, jointly estimated by EU, World Bank group and UN officials, stands at 1,55 billion euros. Officials in Bosnia stated that the damage could exceed that of the Bosnian War. The events initiated a large international aid campaign, with numerous countries, organizations and individuals donating humanitarian, material and monetary support for the affected areas.

== Meteorological history ==
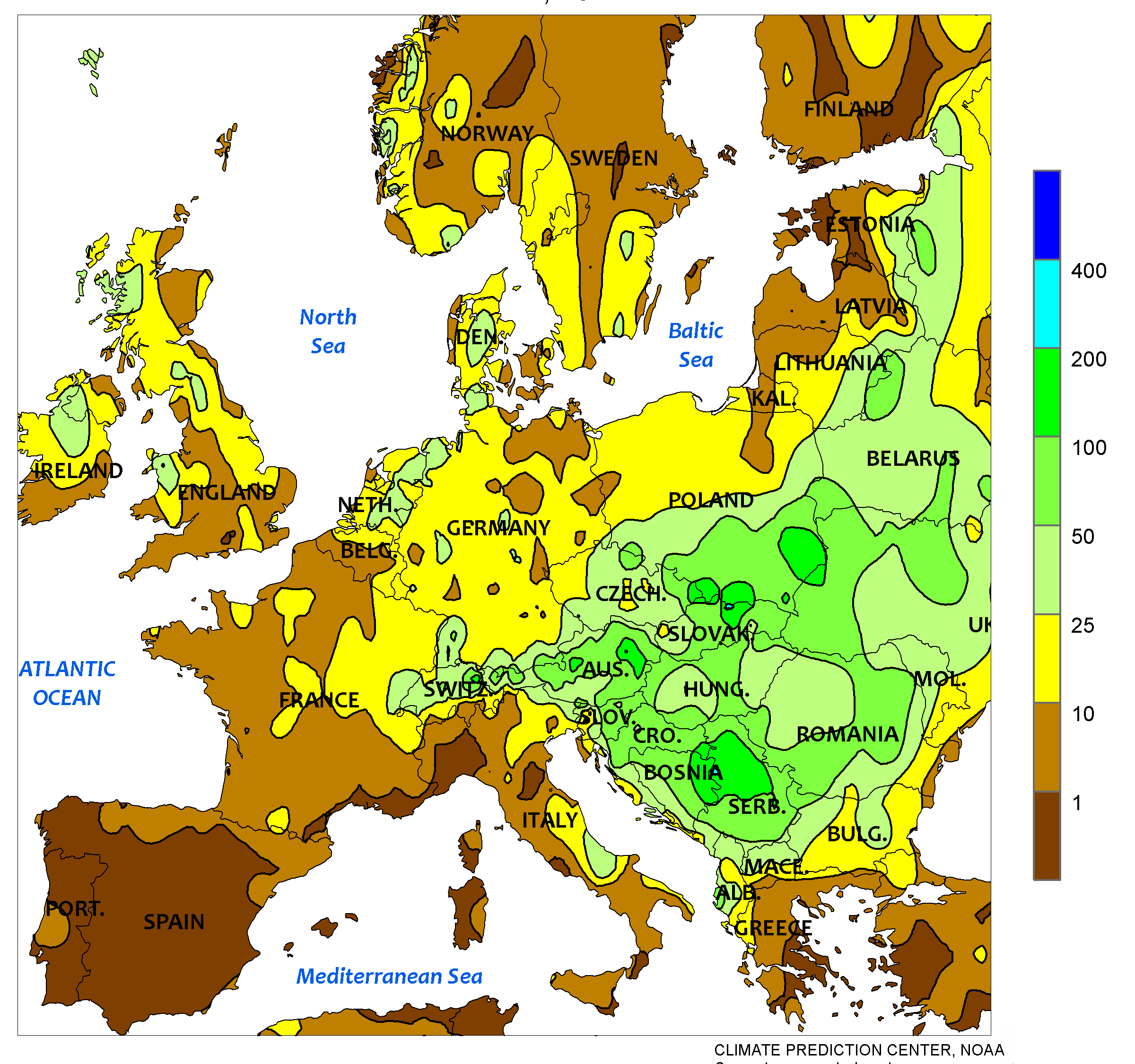
Total precipitation between 11 and 17 May

On 13 May, a low-pressure area formed over the Adriatic Sea, as polar air from Central Europe penetrated into the Mediterranean basin. The cold polar air mass met with humid subtropical air, leading to very low pressure. On 14 May, the low moved over Southeast Europe, becoming stationary. As a result, extremely heavy rain fell within the region; Serbia (in the area around Belgrade) and Bosnia were most affected. Serbian and Bosnian meteorologists named the formed cyclone "Tamara". On 15 May, the daily amounts of rainfall broke historical records in Belgrade (107.9 mm), Valjevo (108.2 mm) and Loznica (110 mm). By 15 May, the monthly rainfall in Belgrade had broken the historical record (175 L from 1897), reaching 205 L. By Saturday, May 17, the rain had subsided, and the weather gradually became warmer and sunnier, somewhat easing relief and rescue efforts. On 18 May, the cyclone moved further northwest.

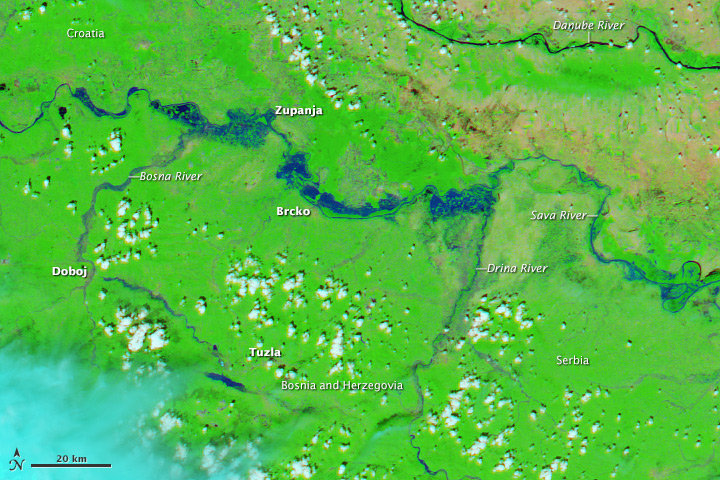
Severe flooding in the region seen by the Moderate Resolution Imaging Spectroradiometer (MODIS) on NASA's Aqua satellite, 19 May 2014.

The main flooding region was the watershed of the Sava river, which forms a border between Bosnia and Croatia, flows into Serbia, and drains into the Danube in Belgrade. On Wednesday, 14 May, heavy rainfall caused torrential floods across mountainous regions, which destroyed bridges and infrastructure, and caused numerous landslides. The deadliest impact occurred on Thursday, 15 May, when water levels in several right-bank tributaries of the Sava suddenly and uncontrollably rose at an unprecedented rate, flooding towns in their valleys. The Bosna river in central Bosnia completely flooded the cities of Doboj, Maglaj, Zavidovići and Šamac, while the Kolubara, near Belgrade, did the same to Obrenovac; those cities had the major share of victims. Subsequently, the Sava itself rose to record-high levels, threatening the cities of Slavonski Brod, Šabac and Sremska Mitrovica and numerous villages, but the damage was relatively contained as the population, helped by army and volunteers, strengthened flood defenses. Nonetheless, embankments gave way in several places.

Heavy rainfall was also experienced in the region on 3 and 4 May, affecting Romania, Italy and Bosnia. The event produced limited damage but left a number of flooding incidents and high rivers. A state of emergency was declared in parts of Bosnia by local government.

== Hydrology ==
Though heaviest affected areas were in the valleys of the Sava and Kolubara rivers, the center of the flood was the drainage basin of the Bosna river and its mouth into the Sava. Water in the Sava then broke through the newly constructed embankment on the left bank in Croatia and flooded the Lower Syrmia region. The water then uncontrollably rushed into the Bosut river which flows back into the Sava in Serbia. In Serbia, the heaviest floods were in the Kolubara river basin where the major rainfall caused extreme torrents in the mountains, causing the hydrological coincidence, a fact that high tidal waves appeared simultaneously on both the left and the right tributaries of the Kolubara. Rivers of Peštan and Vraničina also spilled over, flooding the surface mine "Tamnava-Zapadna Polje", within the Kolubara mines (see Lake Paljuvi). The flooded mines captured 200 million m3 of the flood water.

Belgrade's Institute "Jaroslav Černi", funded by UNDP, compiled a study "Improvement of the water protection in the Kolubara drainage basin". Hydrological section of the report concludes that the cyclone caused the "continual rain of temperate intensity", which however lasted for too long (over three days). In May, the measured 48-hours rainfall was higher than the millennial rains in Loznica while the return period in Belgrade and Valjevo was 400 years. Return periods of the flow in the Kolubara was 120–520 and at the confluence into the Sava, when the Kolubara flooded Obrenovac and the mines, the discharge was 1,456 m^{3}/s (51,400 cu ft/s). If the system against the floods was finished and functioning properly, and that mines and Obrenovac weren't flooded, the discharge would be 2,460 m^{3}/s (87,000 cu ft/s).

In the drainage basin of the Bosna river in Bosnia and Herzegovina, the rains in some places were exceeding the return period of 5,000 years (Vidmar A., et al., "The Bosna River floods in May 2014", Journal on Flood Risk, p. 1–25). At the same time, during the massive overspill in the basin, the return period of the maximal discharge (4,121 m^{3}/s (145,500 cu ft/s), 15 May 2014) was only 152 years and of the wave volume (1,463,000,000 m^{3} (5.17×10^{10} cu ft)) was 189 years. After the reconstruction of the flood in the controlled environment, it was concluded that the discharge of the Bosna at Doboj would be 5,000 m^{3}/s (180,000 cu ft/s) on 16 May 2014. A discharge of the Sava, right after the mouth of the Bosna, at the Šamac bridge, was 6,000 m^{3}/s (210,000 cu ft/s) on 17 May (Abdulaj R., et al., Velike vode donjeg toka rijeke Save tijekom svibnja 2014, Hrvatska vodoprivreda, 207, 14–16, 2014). Downstream, in Sremska Mitrovica in Serbia, the discharge of the Sava was 6,420 m^{3}/s (227,000 cu ft/s) (Hidrološki godišnjak RHMZ Srbije za 2014).

If the entire flood control system in all three countries functioned, and that there were no overspills and floods, a hydrological coincidence of joining the highest Sava and Kolubara water levels would occur. That means that in Belgrade, downstream from the mouth of Kolubara into the Sava, the Sava would bring almost 9,000 m^{3}/s (320,000 cu ft/s). The riparian zone along the Sava in Belgrade, called Savski Nasip and enhanced with the embankments, is designed for receiving 6,500 m^{3}/s (230,000 cu ft/s), so the city would probably suffer a major damage. Additionally, due to the illegal construction of the houses in the Savski Nasip area, the riparian zone is being destroyed and its volume is reduced.

== Affected regions ==
Affected areas of Bosnia and Herzegovina, Serbia and Croatia: Most affected areas Also affected

Serbia was the most severely affected, with several major cities in its central region completely flooded, and landslides in mountainous regions. Bosnia, in particular its Republika Srpska entity, was also inundated to a crippling extent. Eastern Croatia and southern Romania also experienced flooding and human victims, while Austria, Bulgaria, Hungary, Italy, Poland and Slovakia were affected by the storm.

=== Serbia ===
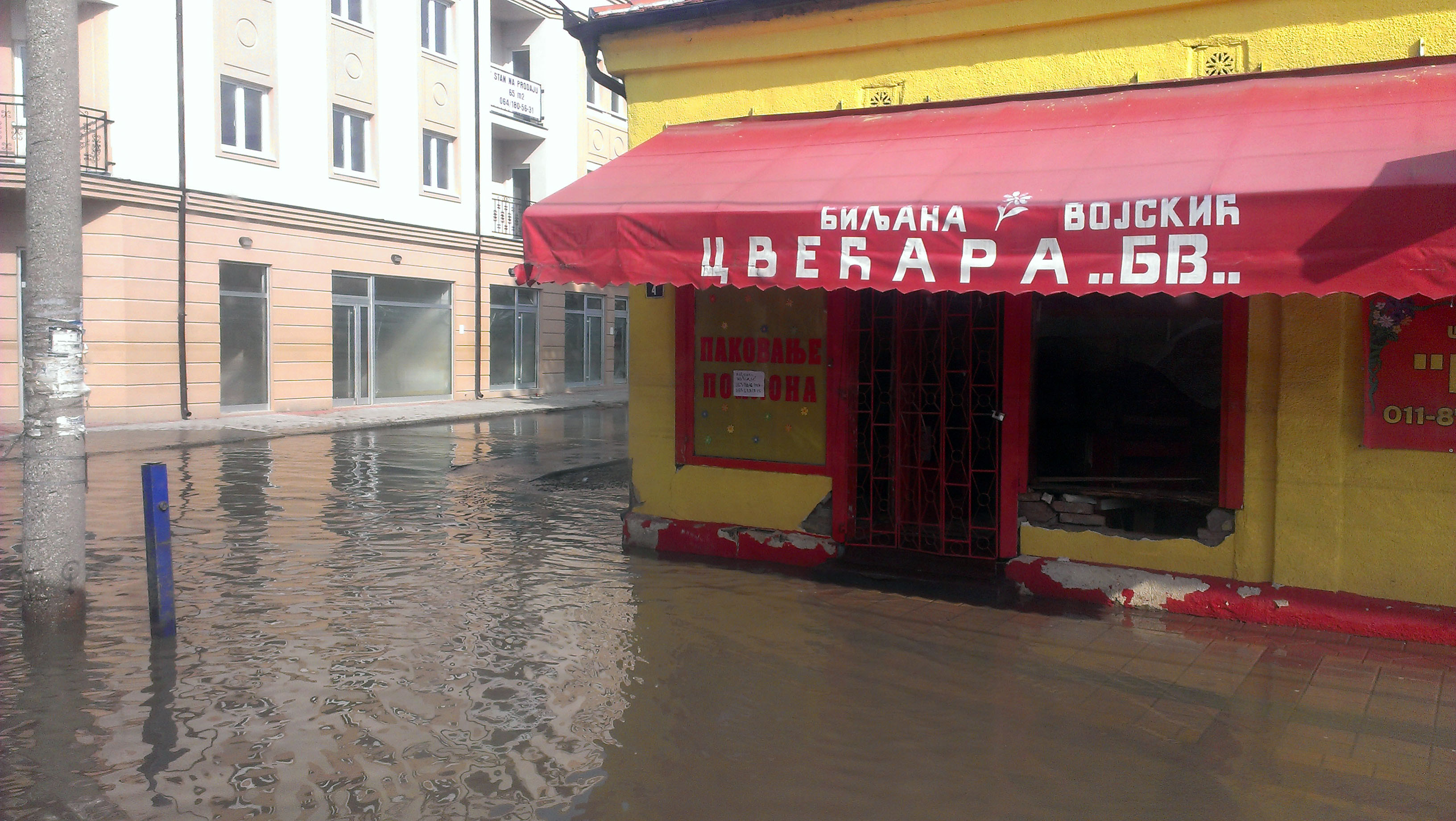
Obrenovac suffered the largest number of casualties and destruction during the flooding

The city of Obrenovac was hit hardest by the floods, with an estimated 90% of the town flooded. During the night between 15 and 16 May, nearby Kolubara river, collecting waters from southerly mountains, suddenly rose several meters above its banks and flooded the city, catching the residents by surprise. The entire city was evacuated. During 18 May, the water level dropped, which enabled the evacuation of the citizens of Obrenovac to be carried out by trucks instead of boats. As of 20 May the total number of evacuated persons exceeded 30,000.

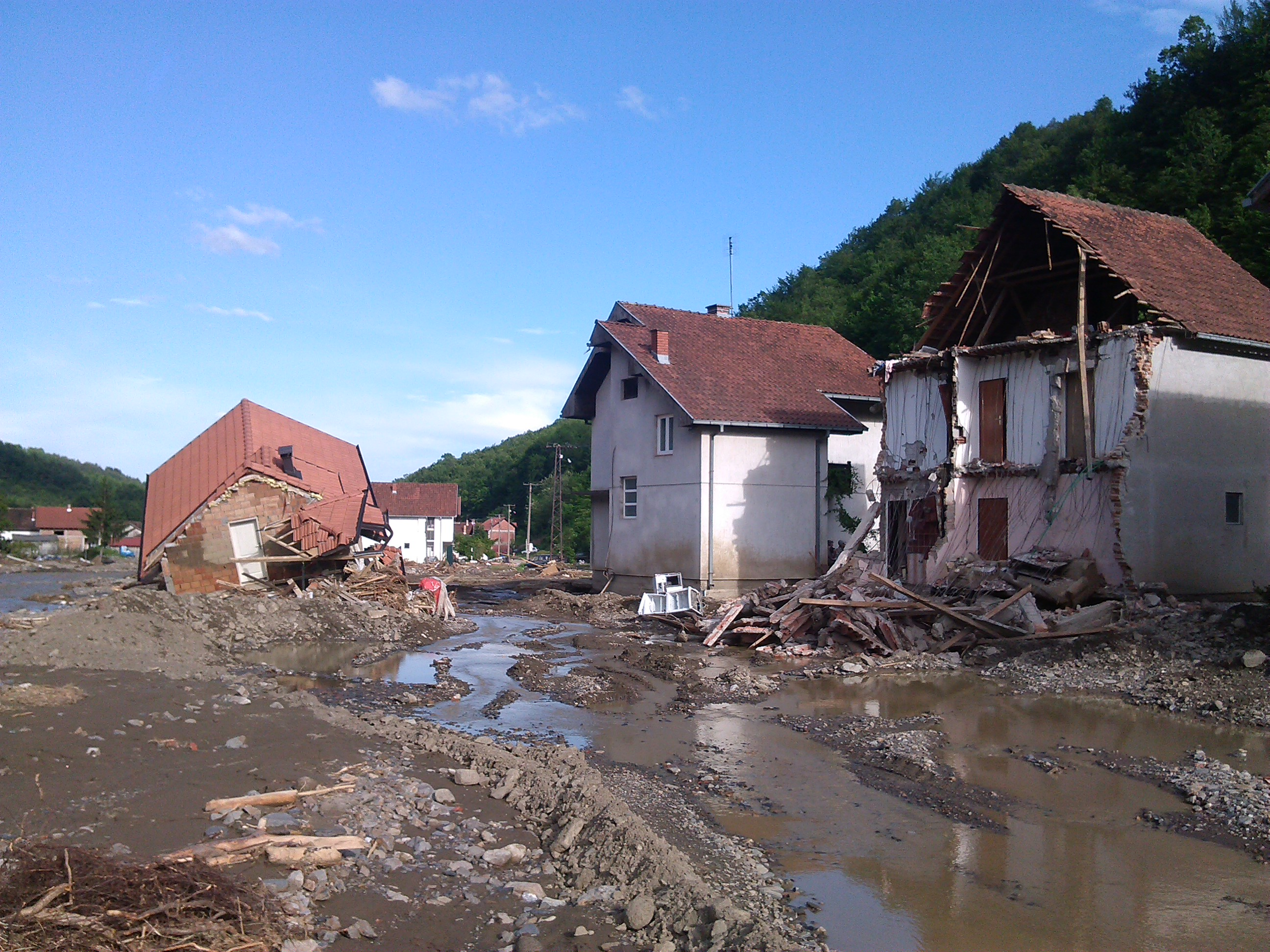
Destruction of Krupanj by a flood

In Krupanj in western Serbia (located in a valley of several small rivers) torrents, mudslides and landslides devastated the infrastructure and destroyed dozens of houses. Because of road damages, the town was completely inaccessible for three days, and the road to Loznica was blocked until 18 May. Electric power was cut for almost the whole municipality. Around 500 houses were seriously damaged and at least 20 houses are completely uninhabitable Part of the village of Rebelj in Valjevo municipality was annihilated by landslides. In the Drina river valley, on the border with Bosnia, heavy rain activated landslides, cutting off several villages and closing roads. At Mali Zvornik, a giant hill threatened to slide into the river and cut its flow, endangering that town and Zvornik across the river.

Peak flood waters from Sava river hit Šabac on 18 May, but the embankments survived, strengthened by efforts of the army and several thousands volunteers. Flood waters on the river reached 6.3 metres (21 ft), the highest on record, endangering Šabac and Sremska Mitrovica on the left bank. In anticipation of the floods, a 7.3-metre-tall (24 ft) temporary embankment was erected.

Further east, along the valleys of Morava and Mlava rivers, city centers of Paraćin, Petrovac na Mlavi, Svilajnac and Smederevska Palanka were flooded.

During the flooding period, an estimated 300,000 households were left without electric power. Serbia's energy minister, Aleksandar Antić, had appealed to individuals to conserve power as best they can. The largest thermoelectric power plant in Serbia, TPP Nikola Tesla, which supplies close to 50% of electricity in Serbia, lies in the vicinity of Obrenovac, but was saved from danger. However, flood waters filled the largest coal field of RB Kolubara with 210 million cubic meters of water, more than the volume of Vlasina lake, and its pumping out took months, starting in September 2014. Further east, the thermoelectric power plant TPP Kostolac, which supplies 11% of electricity in Serbia, was threatened by floods from the Mlava river, but the water had not breached the innermost ring of defenses. During the floods, the hydro plants at Iron Gates reduced their production and opened the gates in order to lower the level of the Danube.

During the floods, transport across the country, particularly central and western parts, was interrupted or broken. 2,260 public, industrial and infrastructure facilities were flooded, and 3,500 roads were destroyed. The Belgrade–Bar railway was severed at several locations in western Serbia, and has been closed; basic reparations took about a month to complete, and afterwards the trains were forced to take a several-hours detour. Reconstruction of the section in the Gradac river canyon was finished in March 2015, allowing the trains to return to the original route.

Agricultural damage in affected areas was total, and the amount is yet to be determined. Thousands of cows, sheep, chicken and other domestic animals perished in the floods, and their corpses present a serious health risk for people who started returning and repairing their homes.

On 20 May, the Government of Serbia proclaimed 3 days of mourning. Serbian Prime Minister Aleksandar Vučić described the flooding as "the worst water catastrophe that has ever hit Serbia."

In a July 2014 report by the Government of Serbia, the total amount of damage in the country was estimated at 1.53 billion Euro. Of those, 810 million was attributed to direct damage, and 662 million to losses. Two thirds of the damage was attributed to the production sector (500 million direct and 569 million indirect), of which 228 million in the agricultural sector. Total damage on the housing was 227.3 million, while the infrastructure damage (transportation, communications and water management) was assessed at 192 million.

=== Bosnia and Herzegovina ===
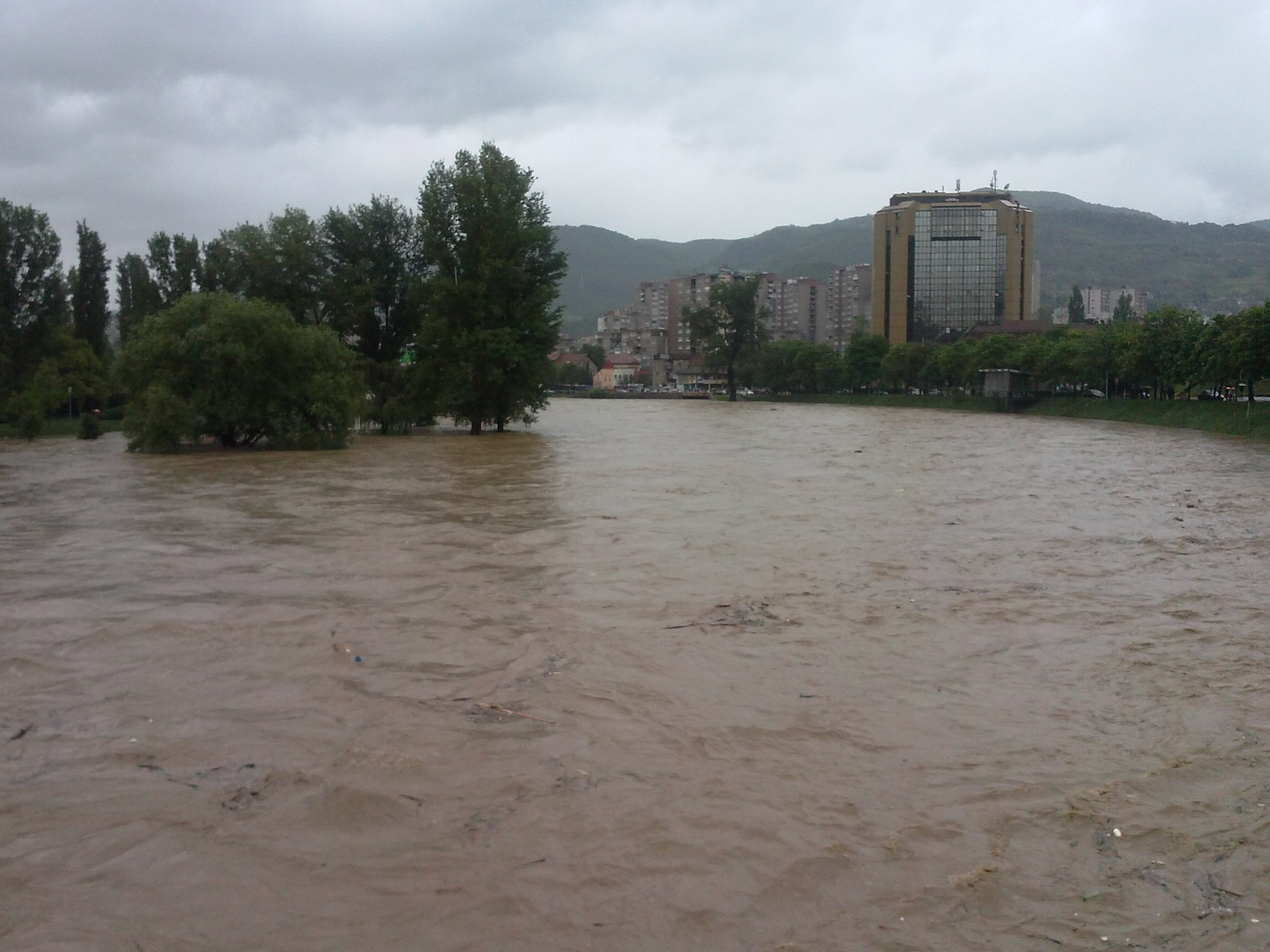
Flooding in Zenica, 15 May 2014

Most of northern Bosnia was flooded, with the Bosna river valley hitting hardest. Other affected areas included the Sarajevo Canton and Tuzla Canton. Northern and northeastern Bosnia, including the region of Semberija, was also flooded. Rivers that flooded included the Bosna, Vrbas, Drina, Sana and Sava. A state of emergency was declared across the nation. Herzegovina in the south and central regions were not hit by floods.

The town of Maglaj experienced the average rainfall of two months in under 48 hours. In the city of Zavidovići, a footbridge was filmed being swept down the Bosna river and crashing into another bridge. In Sarajevo, the Miljacka river swelled almost to the level of city bridges. The entire hamlet of Parići in Hrasno Donje, municipality of Kalesija, was swept away by landslides.

As of 20 May, there were 24 confirmed deaths in Bosnia and Herzegovina: 17 in Republika Srpska and 7 in the Federation. At a press conference on 19 May, the Director of Police of Republika Srpska gave the names of 17 confirmed victims: 10 in Doboj, 2 in Šamac, 2 in Modriča and one each in Bijeljina, Vlasenica and Donji Žabar; an additional 7 persons are still listed as missing. Governments of the two entities jointly declared 20 May a day of mourning across the country.

It was speculated that the floodwaters might have disturbed land mines left over from the Bosnian War (1992–95) which could cause further danger if moved outside the marked areas.

The chief executive of Željeznice Republike Srpske, the railway operator in Republika Srpska (one of two railway operators in Bosnia) appealed for help in repairing the enormous damage to the railways in the country, stating that they were independently unable to repair the damage, appealing for help from the international community in supplying materials, mechanisation and financial assistance.

=== Croatia ===
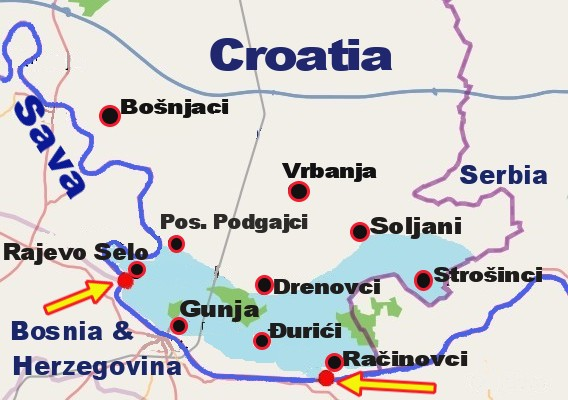
Floods in Croatia; red dots indicate ruptured embankents

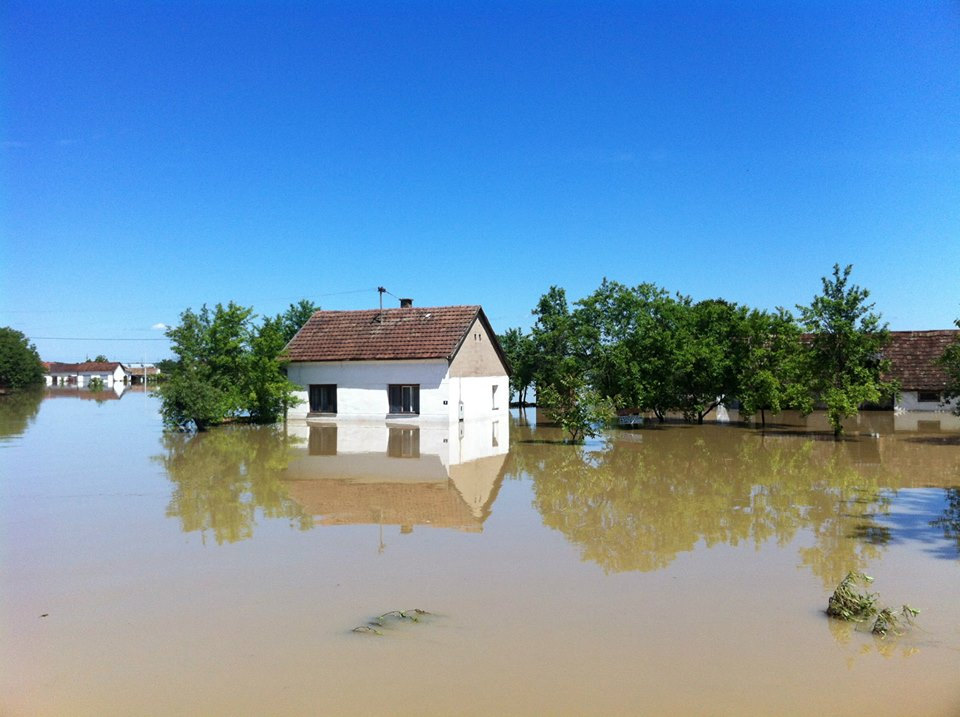
Severe flooding in the Croatian locality of Gunja

Croatia was affected by the floods to a lesser extent than Serbia or Bosnia. The most critical area was in southern Slavonia. The embankment on the Sava River was breached near Rajevo Selo and Račinovci, and thus evacuation was ordered for Gunja, Rajevo Selo and Račinovci. As of 19 May, around 15,000 people in easternmost parts of Croatia were evacuated from their homes. One of the most critical points was the embankment of the Sava river in Slavonski Šamac, where the confluence of the Bosna and Sava is located. At that point the embankments were under severe pressure caused by the huge amount of water coming from Bosnia. Several officials stated that if this embankment were breached, the entire region of southern Slavonia, with a population of over 300 000, would be flooded. There were also floods in Banovina region, in the towns of Hrvatska Kostajnica and Dvor, mostly caused by the river Una, whose level had not been as high since 1955. Video: http://vimeo.com/96164094

=== Romania ===
This was the third major flood to hit Romania since late April 2014. Over 8,000 people were isolated and nearly 2,000 hectares of land were covered by water. On a single day, 125 villages were affected by floods. In total, 30 national and county roads were closed or partially destroyed by water and mud. The waters of the Danube rose so much that the authorities set orange code for flooding for eight days, on the sector Iron Gates–Zimnicea. In Vrancea County, a 50-year-old man was carried away by the flood and found dead the next morning. Bucharest was devastated by a storm accompanied by hail and strong winds. Several streets were flooded, trees were uprooted, and a thick layer of ice covered important transport arteries, paralyzing the traffic in the capital.

=== Slovakia ===
Floods and strong winds from the cyclone also reached Slovakia, where an elderly man drowned.

== International response ==
Many countries and international organizations have offered to provide relief.

- Albania — Albania sent five search and rescue units to Bosnia.
- Austria — Austria sent a civil defense rescue team with high capacity pump to Serbia.
- Azerbaijan — The Government of Azerbaijan sent 40 tonnes of humanitarian aid to the affected population in Bosnia and Herzegovina. Additionally, humanitarian aid was sent to people in critical areas in Serbia. The Government of Azerbaijan also stated that they would donate €400,000 to Serbia's flood relief fund.
- Belarus — President Lukashenko ordered that help be sent. Belarus sent a first contingent to Serbia which amongst other material contained two helicopters with four teams of rescuers. The second contingent included four generators of 100 kilowatts, 20 other generators, 30 pumps for water, 20,000 cans of food, 5,000 blankets, 20 tents for 20 people each, etc.
- Belgium — Belgium sent the B-Fast team, with a convoy of 10 trucks carrying a water treatment installation and pumps to provide drinkable water to the population in Orašje, Bosnia and Herzegovina. A second mission, with rescue boats for Serbia, will not depart, since the Serbian government has announced that plenty of boats are present.
  Bosnian expats in Flanders gathered 40 metric tons of relief goods, to be sent to Bosnia.
- Bulgaria — Bulgaria sent two fire engines with 10 motor pumps and more vehicles with 16 high-capacity water pumps and two boats to Serbia.
- Canada – The Government of Canada provided CAD800,000 in assistance in the aftermath of the catastrophic flooding. Through the Canadian Red Cross, the Government provided CAD200,000 to ICRC operations in Bosnia & Herzegovina, and CAD200,000 to support ICRC efforts in Serbia. The Government of Canada also channelled CAD400,000 through Save the Children Canada to support work in Bosnia & Herzegovina. The Royal Bank of Canada donated CAD50,000 to be used as most needed in Bosnia & Herzegovina, Croatia, and Serbia.
- Croatia — Croatia provided two military transport helicopters to Bosnia and Herzegovina, one helicopter operating in the Banja Luka – Doboj region, and one in Maglaj – Zenica region, 6 teams of the Croatian Mountain Rescue Service with 15 rescuers, and 25 members of the civil protection units and fire brigades with 10 vehicles and 3 boats. 8 intervention policemen with boats are active in Odžak and Orašje. Croatia also sent 65 tons of drinking water to affected areas in Serbia, along with firefighting and civil defence intervention units with 15 members, 5 vehicles and 2 boats, and 9 intervention policemen (including divers) operating in the area of Obrenovac. The Croatian Red Cross opened a donations account for victims of the floods in Croatia, Bosnia and Herzegovina and Serbia. On May 20, the Croatian Red Cross announced that 4,815,681.17 kuna (€632,186.57 ) had been donated for the victims of the floods in Croatia, 543,789.71 kuna (€71,386.90) for the victims in Bosnia-Herzegovina and 435,480.82 kuna (€57,168.47) for the victims in Serbia. Humanitarian trucks travelling toward the affected areas through Croatia motorways were excluded from paying a toll.
- Czech Republic — Czech Republic sent a rescue team with water pumps, a boat and seven vehicles for different purposes to Serbia.
- Estonia — Estonia sent a rescue team and €87,000 to Bosnia and Herzegovina. Estonia also participated in a relief effort in Serbia, together with other EU countries.
- European Union — Bulgaria, Germany, Slovenia, Austria, the Czech Republic, France, Croatia, Lithuania, Latvia, Luxembourg, the UK, Slovakia, Belgium and Estonia responded to the request filed by Serbia and Bosnia & Herzegovina through the Emergency Response Coordination Centre. As of 19 May, more than 220 rescuers from various EU countries are at locations in Serbia.
- France — French humanitarian organization NVO sent help to Serbia. French Ambassador to Serbia, Mr. François-Xavier Deniau, stated that France sent half of their total yearly emergency funds to Serbia. Major French emergency forces team of 40 members arrived in Serbia.
- Germany — Germany sent 15 rescuers with three pumps, five trucks and an aggregate to Serbia.
- Hungary — Hungary sent five boats and a rescue helicopter to Serbia.
- Iceland — Icelandic government is donating 3 million ISK (€19,500) to Bosnia and Serbia.
- India — India donated $100,000 of humanitarian aid to Serbia.
- Israel — Medicines, blankets, raincoats, rubber boats and food were provided in Serbia.
- Ireland — Ireland provided aid worth €50,000 through the NGO World Vision. Ireland released relief supplies worth €220,000 that were distributed via the World Food Programme. This included tents, blankets and water purification tablets.
- Iran — The Red Crescent Society of the Islamic Republic of Iran will be sending humanitarian aid to Serbia.
- Italy — Four rescue boats and €200,000 of humanitarian aid for the people in Serbia will be sent from Italy, Italian Ambassador to Serbia Giuseppe Manzo has said.
- Japan — The Japanese government sent Bosnia and Herzegovina ¥10,000,000 worth of resources, and Serbia resources for use worth $100,000.
- Luxembourg — Luxembourg sent a rescue team of 24 members to northern Bosnia.
- Kosovo — Kosovo Security Force Minister Agim Çeku offered to help by sending rescue teams to Bosnia and Serbia, but this offer was refused.
- Macedonia — 75 rescue workers and large groups of volunteers (150 volunteers from the city of Kumanovo, and many others from other cities), 45 pumps, 9 boats and various other equipment were sent. The Macedonian Red Cross, universities and private businesses have organized special fundraising events to support the victims of the floods. A telephone service is available so that people may donate. Many spots in the city of Skopje collect various kinds of aid. As of May 19, the telephone service has collected 7.3 million MKD (€120,000) in aid. The Macedonian Orthodox Church also sent 3 million MKD (€50,000) in financial aid.
- Malaysia — The Malaysian Relief Agency (MRA) had channelled aid totalling MYR 43,780 (€10,000) in the form of food packs and health kits to the province of Odžak in Bosnia and Herzegovina, the MRA also has launched a public fund since 24 May to assist the flood victims in response to the appeal by the Bosnian government. Beside that, a Malaysian newspaper, The Sun public fund had raised a total of MYR 1,128,911 (€268,296.99) from the Malaysian public including a personal donation from the founder of the Berjaya Group and the owner of Cardiff City F.C. and FK Sarajevo, Vincent Tan with MYR 500,000 (€114,000).
- Montenegro — 41 soldiers of the Montenegrin army with 7 military SUVs, 6 trucks and additional equipment were sent to Obrenovac. Divers and alpinists from Special counter-terrorist police unit have been sent to Obrenovac. Over 70 professional rescuers and firefighters were also sent to Serbia. More than 200 volunteers went to Serbia to provide help. More have asked to join, but it was not possible to organize transport. Unknown number of boats and pumps was also sent along with the military, police and rescue units. Montenegrin government offered to put two helicopters at the disposal of Serbia and Bosnia but they weren't called for. Several municipalities, as well as some companies, have donated money. In several cities there were organised donations of foods, rations and clothes. The Directorate for Emergency Situations of the Ministry for Interior Affairs sent four trucks with blankets, raincoats and sleeping bags to Serbia and two to Bosnia. Numerous private companies sent supplies in food and water. The Montenegrin Red Cross opened two bank accounts for help to flooded areas, and, together with all Montenegrin mobile operators, organised a special number where people can donate money by sending an SMS. About €550,000 was raised with SMS and the bank accounts as of 30 June 2014. Montenegrin Red Cross also gathered 264 tons of water, 15 tons of juice, 12.5 tons of food and 4.5 tons of hygiene products in relief efforts for Serbia and Bosnia. Football Association of Montenegro donated €40,000. Montenegrin prime minister Milo Đukanović sent condolences to his Serbian colleague Aleksandar Vučić about deaths that occurred. Đukanović also said that Montenegro will provide aid and all of its help resources to the Government of Serbia.
- Netherlands — Dutch Minister of Foreign Affairs Frans Timmermans said on 20 May that The Netherlands will donate €500,000 to Bosnia and Serbia.
- Poland — Poland sent a rescue team of 37 firefighters to Bosnia, with special pumps and 15 fire trucks. The Polish soldiers from EUFOR are providing assistance.
- Norway — Kingdom of Norway, among first, supported with around €3.000.000 most vulnerable victims, as Ambassador to Serbia, Mr. Nils Ragnar Kamsvåg said. Norway then donated $627.000 to the Serbian Government to be used for water purification and water tanks. The Norwegian Red Cross raising funds for Serbia and Bosnia-Herzegovina, collecting around €190.000 by May 22. Norwegian Embassy in Belgrade decided to create a relief fund with €500.000 for support. Norway also participated through United Nations support.
- Romania — Also heavily confronted with floods, Romania will send help to neighboring Serbia. Prime Minister Victor Ponta announced that the Romanian authorities will send a large water removal generator and perishable items such as food, water, blankets, clothes, etc.
- Russia — Russia sent four Ilyushin Il-76 aircraft carrying 76 rescue workers including 20 divers and 70 tons of humanitarian aid to Serbia. Specialists from the Russian-Serb humanitarian center in Serbia were also participating in work dealing with flood consequences by providing mobile power stations and motor pumps. Russian aid has saved thousands of lives with one operation seeing almost 400 people rescued including at least 79 children.
- Slovakia — Slovak government sent 6 tons of humanitarian aid to Serbia (78 000 €) and also humanitarian aid for Bijeljina city in Bosnia (50 000 €). Also the fans of two biggest Slovak football teams sent a financial aid about 40 000 €.
- Slovenia — Hours after Bosnia and Herzegovina and Serbia requested help, Slovenia decided to send a special unit of civil protection, along with four vehicles, 20 experts and two special pumps to Serbia, and two units with motor boats, a 12-member unit of civil protection, a Slovenian military Bell 412 helicopter with its crew and a police AB 212 helicopter with two crews to Bosnia and Herzegovina. The day after another 26 civil protection members departed for Serbia, with four motor boats and six rescue vehicles. In addition, a Slovenian military Eurocopter AS532 Cougar helicopter was dispatched to Serbia. During the afternoon of May 19 Slovenia sent 22 tons of humanitarian aid to Bosnia and Herzegovina, which was followed with another 10 tons sent in the evening. Slovenian food company Žito have contributed an additional 11 tons of food aid which was sent to Bosnia and Herzegovina. On 20 May a Slovenian military convoy, containing 30 soldiers and 13 military trucks, departed towards the affected areas with another batch of humanitarian aid. The convoy was joined by six civilian trucks. On the same day the Slovenian Government sent another special pump to Serbia, dispatched to the site of the threatened TPP Nikola Tesla power plant near Obrenovac. A civil initiative led by former professional basketball player Radoslav Nesterović has gathered and sent more than 400 tons of aid during the first ten days. With the help of donations the Slovenian Red Cross sent a total of €100,000 to Bosnia and Herzegovina and Serbia; 50,000 to the Red Cross Society of Bosnia and Herzegovina and 50,000 to the Red Cross of Serbia. The Slovenian Caritas donated an additional €10,000. The Slovenian Red Cross have also sent 650 tons of humanitarian aid during May. On 1 June the Slovenian Government sent a company of 120 soldiers to the affected areas in Bosnia and Herzegovina, equipped with a variety of combat and off-road vehicles, equipment for water and soil sampling, chemical and veterinary laboratories, a unit of medical care and the department for the destruction of unexploded ordnance.
- Sweden — Sweden donated pumping equipment, bought from the distributor Meris. The equipment was sold at non-profit levels to the Swedish government, which provided the €20,000 funding of the donation. Meris also donated three pumps on their own initiative.
- Switzerland — Migros, Switzerland's largest retail company, donated 500,000 CHF through the Swiss Red Cross.
- Turkey — Turkish Prime Minister Recep Tayyip Erdoğan called Bosniak President Bakir Izetbegović and Serbian Prime Minister Aleksandar Vučić to offer his heartfelt condolences on flood disaster. Also, PM said that Turkey stands ready to provide any assistance to Bosnia & Herzegovina and Serbia. Turkish Disaster and Emergency Management Presidency has sent a 41-person rescue team with a C-130 cargo aircraft for search-and-rescue operations as well as much-needed supplies and equipment such as 125,000 sandbags, blankets and generators to the region.
- Turkmenistan — providing humanitarian assistance in the form of medicines, medical supplies, as well as wheat flour.
- UAE — Crown Prince of Abu Dhabi Mohammed bin Zayed Al Nahyan told President Tomislav Nikolić that the UAE would send $10 million in aid.
- United Kingdom — On 19 May the UK sent 33 Flood Rescue personnel with 4 motor boats to Bosnia to provide assistance on the ground. The UK sent three experts as part of the EU's civil protection assessment and coordination team to Serbia, including an expert from the UK Fire and Rescue Service. Volunteers from Flooding on the Levels Action Group (FLAG) with recent expertise in assisting in the Somerset floods, including volunteers from Khalsa Aid, are also helping out.
- United States — American helicopters helped rescue people in both Bosnia and Serbia. The US Department of Defense announced that it would be sending 26 tons of humanitarian aid to Bosnia and Herzegovina, consisting of water purification units, water cans and kitchen equipment; sand bags and shovels; sleeping bags, blankets, sleeping mats and cots; generators and fuel; and wet weather gear and clothing. The US embassies in Bosnia and Serbia have also established processes that will provide additional funds and resources such as food, cots, blankets, water and fuel cans, portable kitchen sets, space heaters, generators and water pumps.
- United Nations — donated to Serbia equipment for mobile toilets and generators worth $583,000 which was completely funded by Norwegian government.

=== Celebrity response ===
- Novak Djokovic and Nenad Zimonjić showed their support for flood victims and appealed via Twitter for donations to help the flood victims. Djokovic also criticized the lack of media coverage internationally, calling the media "idle". Following his win over Rafael Nadal at the 2014 Italian Open, he donated all of the $500,000 in prize money that he had received to the victims of the flooding and collected another $100,000 through the Novak Djokovic Foundation.
- The Dejan Stanković Foundation collected and donated over €315,000.
- Singers Lepa Brena and Saša Popović, who jointly own Serbian folk label Grand Production, donated €20,000 personally as well as €250,000 via United Group.
- Romanian businessman Ion Țiriac, owner of the Mutua Madrileña Madrid Open tennis Masters Tournament, and a former tennis and hockey player, donated $100,000 to flooding victims in Serbia.
- Nikola Peković of the Minnesota Timberwolves donated €50,000.
- Angelina Jolie donated $50,000 to the US Red Cross for Bosnia and Serbia.
- Goran Bregović donated €20,000 for the towns of Maglaj and Ub and called for particular consideration for the affected Roma families.
- Ceca Ražnatović donated €20,000.
- Ana Ivanovic, who is a UNICEF Goodwill Ambassador for Serbia, donated €8,700.
- Emir Kusturica donated his helicopters to be used for rescuing people.
- Billy Idol pledged to donate part of his earnings from his concert in Serbia.
- Adriana Lima called for aid to Serbia through the Novak Djokovic Foundation.
- Dutch TV chef Rudolph van Veen cooked for mothers with children on May 20 in one of the centers for evacuees in Belgrade.
- Alexander, Crown Prince of Yugoslavia and his wife Katherine, Crown Princess of Yugoslavia visited Obrenovac, Topola, Natalinac, Blaznava, Šabac and Krupanj (along with the collective centers in Karaburma, Surčin and Krnjača) and donated aid in value of over €30,000.
- Miralem Pjanić (Bosnian international footballer) bought an entire pharmacy worth of medication to assist flooding victims in Bosnia and Herzegovina.

== Aftermath ==
Officials say it may take 5 years for agriculture in the affected regions to recover. The managing director of the Kolubara coal field stated that it would take one year for the Tamnava pit to be dredged and dried, while the Veliki Crljeni pit would take around two months to be operational again. He has stated that the Tamnava pit is now an artificial lake. The Kolubara coal fields are open pits from which coal is supplied to the TPP Nikola Tesla. There are enough stockpiles of coal at hand to bridge the period until the coal pits are fully operational, but the delivery system needs repairs.

The European Commissioner for Development and Humanitarian Aid Kristalina Georgieva stated that Croatia and Serbia have the possibility to apply for aid from the European Union Solidarity Fund, up to one billion euro in one year, but this was later rescinded as a misstatement of the Commissioner. The EU Solidarity Fund in 2014 is 500 million euros, while individual countries can expect around 10 million. The aid can be transferred if the damage is assessed to be over 0.64% of the country's GDP. For Serbia, that would be around 175 million euros in damages. Bosnia, not being a candidate or member country of the EU, is not eligible for aid from this fund.

Serbia applied for the World Bank aid credit, amounting to a total of €227 million.

== See also ==
- 2013 European floods
- 2013 Sardinia floods
- 2014 Bulgarian floods
- Genoa low
- Flood control
- List of floods in Europe
