= Dubnica (disambiguation) =

Dubnica is a town in Slovakia. Dubnica may also refer to:

- Dubnica (Kalesija), Bosnia and Herzegovina
- Dubnica (Kosjerić), Serbia
- Dubnica (Sjenica), Serbia
- Dubnica (Svilajnac), Serbia
- Dubnica (Vranje), Serbia

== See also ==
- Dubnica Monastery, Božetići, Serbia
- Dupnitsa, Bulgaria
