= Salko Bukvarević =

Bosnian politician (1967–2020)

Federal Minister for Veterans and Disabled Veterans
- In office 31 March 2015 – 29 July 2020
- Prime Minister: Fadil Novalić
- Preceded by: Zukan Helez
- Succeeded by: Nedžad Lokmić

Personal details
- Born: 20 April 1967 Hrasno Gornje, Kalesija, SR Bosnia and Herzegovina, SFR Yugoslavia
- Died: 29 July 2020 (aged 53) Sarajevo, Bosnia and Herzegovina
- Party: Party of Democratic Action (1990–2020)
- Children: 2
- Education: Mining-Geological-Civil Engineering Faculty (SB, MD, PhD)

Military service
- Allegiance: Bosnia and Herzegovina
- Branch/service: Army of the Republic of Bosnia and Herzegovina
- Years of service: 1992–1995
- Unit: Patriotic League
- Battles/wars: Bosnian War

Salko Bukvarević (20 April 1967 – 29 July 2020) was a Bosnian politician and soldier who served as the Federal Minister for Veterans and Disabled Veterans.

In 1990, Bukvarević was one of the founders of the Party of Democratic Action. During the Bosnian War he served in the Bosnian army and was one of the founders of the Patriotic League paramilitary unit. Following the war he served in multiple positions before being appointed as the Minister for Veterans and Disabled Veterans, which he served as from 31 March 2015 until his death due to COVID-19 complications on 29 July 2020.

== Early life and education ==
Bukvarević was born on 20 April 1967, in Hrasno Gornje, Kalesija, SR Bosnia and Herzegovina, SFR Yugoslavia. In 1986, he graduated from high school in Tuzla. In 1996, he graduated from the Mining-Geological-Civil Engineering Faculty with an undergraduate degree, with a Master's degree in 2004, and a Doctorate in 2011. He later married and had two children.

== Career ==
=== Army ===
From 1992 to 1995, Bukvarević served in the Army of the Republic of Bosnia and Herzegovina. He was one of the founders of the Patriotic League paramilitary unit and received the unit's gold medal.

=== Politics ===
Bukvarević was one of the founders of the Party of Democratic Action in 1990. From 1996 to 1999, he served as a member of the Party of Democratic Action's presidency.

From 1995 to 1998, he served as the Secretary of the Tuzla Canton Committee inside the Party of Democratic Action. From 1998 to 2007, he served as the Director of the Public Facility Bosnian Cultural Center in the Tuzla Canton. From 2007 to 2010, he served as a representative in the Tuzla Canton Assembly.

==== Ministry ====
On 31 March 2015, Bukvarević was appointed to serve as the Federal Minister for Veterans and Disabled Veterans.

In 2016, representatives of the Association of Demobilized Soldiers of the Army of the Republic of Bosnia and Herzegovina and the Croatian Defence Council protested, calling for Bukvarević's resignation and created a resolution calling for the resolving of the existential issues of the families of martyrs, war invalids, demobilized veterans and winners of the highest recognition and decorations. Bukvarević refused to resign stating that the organization was representative of less than ten percent of veterans.

== Death ==
On 22 July 2020, Bukvarević contracted COVID-19 during the COVID-19 pandemic in Bosnia and Herzegovina, was placed on a ventilator on 28 July, and died on 29 July at the Clinical Center of the University of Sarajevo. On 1 August, he was buried in Džindić mosque in Tuzla, Bosnia and Herzegovina.
