= Zukići =

Zukići may refer to the following villages in Bosnia and Herzegovina:

- Zukići (Kalesija)
- Zukići (Konjic)
- Zukići, Živinice
