= Asım Pars =

Turkish basketball player (1976–2024)

Personal information
- Born: 1 April 1976 Tuzla, SR Bosnia and Herzegovina, SFR Yugoslavia
- Died: 23 September 2024 (aged 48) Tojšići, Bosnia and Herzegovina
- Listed height: 7 ft 0 in (2.13 m)
- Listed weight: 231 lb (105 kg)

Career information
- NBA draft: 1998: undrafted
- Playing career: 1992–2013
- Position: Center
- Number: 5, 8, 11, 14

Career history
- 1992–1993: Sloboda Dita
- 1993–1994: Galatasaray
- 1994–1996: KK Zagreb
- 1996: Tuborg
- 1996–1998: Ülkerspor
- 1998–2000: Tofaş
- 2000–2001: Fenerbahçe
- 2001–2002: Ülkerspor
- 2002–2003: Efes Pilsen
- 2003: Dynamo Moscow
- 2003–2006: Tuborg
- 2006–2007: Lokomotiv Rostov
- 2007–2008: Pınar Karşıyaka
- 2008–2009: Türk Telekom
- 2009–2012: Mersin BB
- 2012–2013: Erdemirspor

Asım Pars (born Asim Paščanović; 1 April 1976 – 23 September 2024) was a Turkish professional basketball player. He stood 2.13 m tall and played as a center. He had a dual citizenship, Turkish and Bosnian.

== Personal life and death ==
During the early 2000s, Pars married his girlfriend Amra Mehinović. The couple's first child, son Emre, was born in 2003. Their second child, daughter Saira, was born in 2010 in Adana while Mersin player Pars was in town for a game versus Adana Demirspor and his pregnant wife, who had accompanied him for the trip, unexpectedly went into labour.

On 23 September 2024, Pars' body was found at his family home in Tojšići, near Kalesija. He was 48. According to media reports, Tuzla Canton Interior Ministry and Kalesija Medical Center determined his death to have come about via suicide by hanging.
