= Zelina =

Zelina may refer to:

- Sveti Ivan Zelina, a town in Croatia
  - NK Zelina, a football club
  - Zelina, a team in the Croatian First League (women's handball)
- Zelina (Kalesija), a village in Bosnia and Herzegovina
- Zelina Vega (born 1990), American wrestler
- Zelina (river), a river in Croatia, tributary of the Lonja
