= Vilčevići =

Vilčevići Вилчевићи
- Village
- Location within Bosnia and Herzegovina
- Coordinates: 44°23′0″N 18°57′55″E
- Country: Bosnia and Herzegovina
- Entity: Republika Srpska
- Municipality: Osmaci
- Time zone: UTC+1 (CET)
  - Summer (DST): UTC+2 (CEST)

Vilčevići (Cyrillic: Вилчевићи) is a village in the municipality of Osmaci, Republika Srpska, Bosnia and Herzegovina.
