= Bulatovci =

Bulatovci Булатовци
- Village
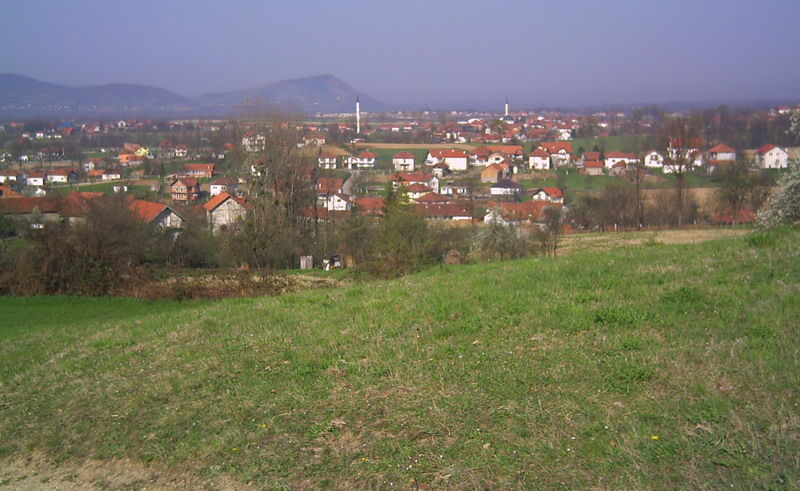

- Location within Bosnia and Herzegovina
- Coordinates: 44°25′23″N 18°56′34″E
- Country: Bosnia and Herzegovina
- Entity: Republika Srpska; Federation of Bosnia and Herzegovina
- Region Canton: Bijeljina; Tuzla
- Municipality: Osmaci; Kalesija

Area
  - Total: 1.40 sq mi (3.62 km^{2})

Population (2013)
  - Total: 302
  - Density: 216/sq mi (83.4/km^{2})
- Time zone: UTC+1 (CET)
  - Summer (DST): UTC+2 (CEST)

Bulatovci (Cyrillic: Булатовци) is a village in the municipalities of Osmaci (Republika Srpska) and Kalesija, Bosnia and Herzegovina.

== Demographics ==
According to the 2013 census, its population was 302, with none of them living in the Osmaci part thus all in the Kalesija part.

Ethnicity in 2013
Ethnicity	Number	Percentage
Bosniaks	301	99.7%
other/undeclared	1	0.3%
Total	302	100%
