= Črni Vrh =

Črni Vrh means 'black peak' in Slovene and may refer to:

== Populated places ==
- Črni Vrh, Dobrova–Polhov Gradec, Slovenia
- Črni Vrh, Idrija, Slovenia
  - Črni Vrh Observatory, astronomical observatory
- Črni Vrh, Tabor, a dispersed settlement in the Municipality of Tabor, Slovenia
- Črni Vrh v Tuhinju, Slovenia
- Montefosca, a settlement in Pulfero, Province of Udine, Italy, known as Črni Vrh in Slovene

== Mountains ==
- Črni vrh, a peak on Pohorje, Slovenia

== Other uses ==
- Črni Vrh dialect, a Slovene dialect

== See also ==
- Crni Vrh (disambiguation), Serbo-Croatian equivalent
