= Sajtovići =

Sajtovići Сајтовићи
- Village
- Location within Bosnia and Herzegovina
- Coordinates: 44°22′41″N 18°53′27″E
- Country: Bosnia and Herzegovina
- Entity: Republika Srpska
- Municipality: Osmaci
- Time zone: UTC+1 (CET)
  - Summer (DST): UTC+2 (CEST)

Sajtovići (Cyrillic: Сајтовићи) is a village in the municipality of Osmaci, Bosnia and Herzegovina.
