= Gojčin (Kalesija) =

- Village
- Location within Bosnia and Herzegovina
- Coordinates: 44.391301°N 18.8353818°E
- Country: Bosnia and Herzegovina
- Entity: Republika Srpska; Federation of Bosnia and Herzegovina
- Region Canton: Bijeljina; Tuzla
- Municipality: Osmaci; Kalesija

Area
  - Total: 5.09 sq mi (13.19 km^{2})

Population (2013)
  - Total: 540
  - Density: 110/sq mi (41/km^{2})

Gojčin is a village in the municipalities of Osmaci (Republika Srpska) and Kalesija, Bosnia and Herzegovina.

== Demographics ==
According to the 2013 census, its population was 540, with 119 of them living in the Osmaci part and 421 in the Kalesija part.

Ethnicity in 2013
Ethnicity	Number	Percentage
Bosniaks	394	73.0%
Serbs	140	25.9%
other/undeclared	6	1.1%
Total	540	100%
