= Jelovo Brdo =

- Village
- Location within Bosnia and Herzegovina
- Country: Bosnia and Herzegovina
- Entity: Federation of Bosnia and Herzegovina
- Canton: Tuzla
- Municipality: Kalesija

Area
  - Total: 1.74 sq mi (4.51 km^{2})

Population (2013)
  - Total: 489
  - Density: 281/sq mi (108/km^{2})

Jelovo Brdo is a village in the municipality of Kalesija, Bosnia and Herzegovina.

== Demographics ==
According to the 2013 census, its population was 489.

Ethnicity in 2013
Ethnicity	Number	Percentage
Bosniaks	481	98.4%
Serbs	6	1.2%
other/undeclared	2	0.4%
Total	489	100%
