= Prnjavor (Kalesija) =

- Village
- Location within Bosnia and Herzegovina
- Country: Bosnia and Herzegovina
- Entity: Federation of Bosnia and Herzegovina
- Canton: Tuzla
- Municipality: Kalesija

Area
  - Total: 2.28 sq mi (5.90 km^{2})

Population (2013)
  - Total: 1,515
  - Density: 665/sq mi (257/km^{2})

Prnjavor is a village in the municipality of Kalesija, Bosnia and Herzegovina.

== Demographics ==
According to the 2013 census, its population was 1,515.

Ethnicity in 2013
Ethnicity	Number	Percentage
Bosniaks	1,505	99.3%
Serbs	1	0.1%
other/undeclared	9	0.6%
Total	1,515	100%
