= Sarači =

Sarači Сарачи
- Village
- Location within Bosnia and Herzegovina
- Country: Bosnia and Herzegovina
- Entity: Federation of Bosnia and Herzegovina
- Canton: Tuzla
- Municipality: Kalesija

Area
  - Total: 0.22 sq mi (0.56 km^{2})

Population (2013)
  - Total: 470
  - Density: 2,200/sq mi (840/km^{2})

Sarači (Cyrillic: Сарачи) is a village in the municipality of Kalesija, Bosnia and Herzegovina.

== Demographics ==
According to the 2013 census, its population was 470.

Ethnicity in 2013
Ethnicity	Number	Percentage
Bosniaks	465	98.8%
other/undeclared	5	1.1%
Total	470	100%
