= Crni Vrh mass grave =

- Location: 44°21′20″N 19°03′15″E; Crni Vrh, Bosnia and Herzegovina
- Date: 1992–1995
- Target: Bosnian Muslims
- Attack type: Mass killing and ethnic cleansing
- Deaths: 629
- Perpetrator: Serb paramilitary groups

The Crni Vrh mass grave, discovered in 2003, is among the largest mass graves found in Bosnia and Herzegovina after the Bosnian War of the 1990s. It was discovered on the mountain Crni Vrh, and contained the remains of 629 Bosniak victims, killed by Serb forces in the villages surrounding Zvornik in 1992 and Srebrenica in 1995. The International Commission on Missing Persons said that the victims had originally been buried in other locations, but were reburied in the remote grave on Crni Vrh after the war in an effort to conceal the crimes.

== Discovery and exhumation ==
In 2003, a mass grave containing the remains of 629 Bosniak victims killed by Serb forces was uncovered on Mount Crni Vrh, and became one of the largest discovered mass grave in Bosnia and Herzegovina following the Bosnian War of the 1990's. The exhumation of the mass grave began on 28 July 2003. On 20 August 2003, it was announced that 112 complete bodies and about 40 other incomplete corpses had been exhumed at that point, with hundreds more expect to be discovered in the grave. During the two-month exhumation of the site, Crni Vrh was visited by numerous local and foreign officials, assuring the severity of the crime. Clothing and documents found in the mass grave indicated that the victims were mostly Bosnian Muslim civilians who were killed by local Serb forces in the period between April and June 1992 in and around Zvornik. The decomposed corpses of men, women and children were found. The body of a Muslim child between five and six years of age was found, killed by a bullet in the spine. The hands of some of the victims were tied before their executions.

== Burials and trials ==
On 15 April 2006, 42 of the exhumed victims from Crni Vrh and another mass grave in Kazanbašča were laid to rest in the Martyr cemetery in Memići near Kalesija. No one has been indicted by the International Criminal Tribunal for the former Yugoslavia (ICTY).
