= Lipovice (Kalesija) =

Lipovice Липовице
- Village
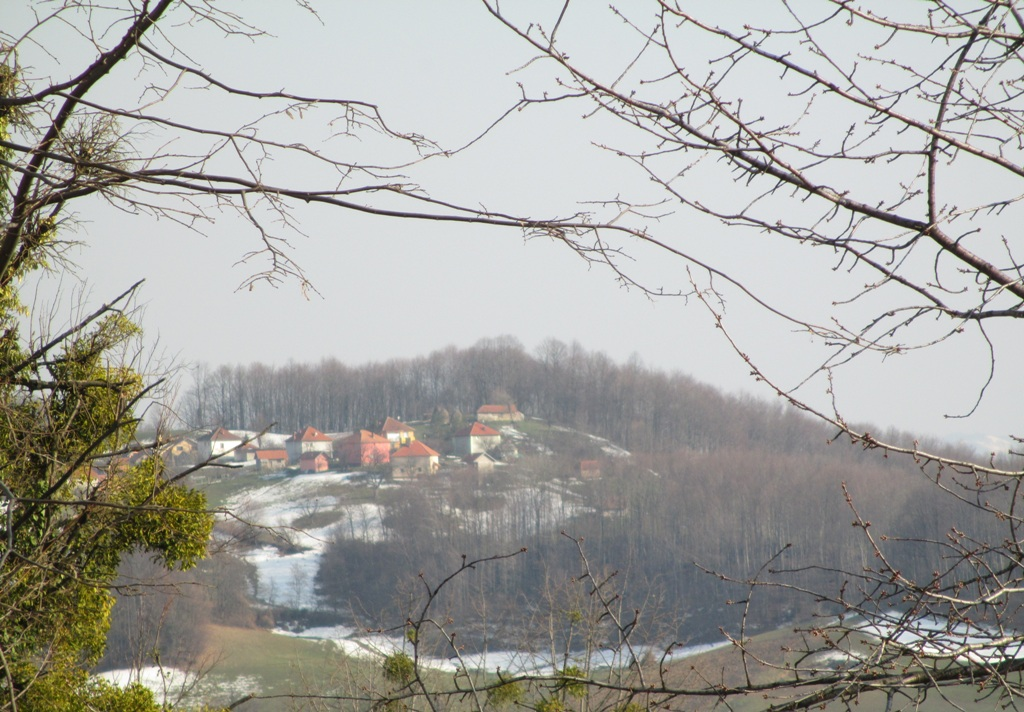
- View of Lipovice Landscape

- Location within Bosnia and Herzegovina
- Country: Bosnia and Herzegovina
- Entity: Federation of Bosnia and Herzegovina
- Canton: Tuzla
- Municipality: Kalesija

Area
  - Total: 2.03 sq mi (5.25 km^{2})

Population (2013)
  - Total: 1,158
  - Density: 571/sq mi (221/km^{2})

Lipovice (Cyrillic: Липовице) is a village in the municipality of Kalesija, Bosnia and Herzegovina. In Lipovice lives 1158 residents. Residents are engaged mainly in primary production and agriculture. The most important building in the village is "Lipovacka Dzamija" (mosque).

== Demographics ==
According to the 2013 census, its population was 1,158.

Ethnicity in 2013
Ethnicity	Number	Percentage
Bosniaks	1,147	99.1%
Croats	1	0.1%
other/undeclared	10	0.9%
Total	1,158	100%
