= Vukovije Donje =

Vukovije Donje Вуковије Доње
- Village
- Location within Bosnia and Herzegovina
- Country: Bosnia and Herzegovina
- Entity: Federation of Bosnia and Herzegovina
- Canton: Tuzla
- Municipality: Kalesija

Area
  - Total: 3.69 sq mi (9.55 km^{2})

Population (2013)
  - Total: 2,874
  - Density: 779/sq mi (301/km^{2})

Vukovije Donje (Cyrillic: Вуковије Доње) is a village in the municipality of Kalesija, Bosnia and Herzegovina.

== Demographics ==
According to the 2013 census, its population was 2,874.

Ethnicity in 2013
Ethnicity	Number	Percentage
Bosniaks	2,840	98.8%
Croats	6	0.2%
other/undeclared	28	1.0%
Total	2,874	100%
