= Miljanovci (Kalesija) =

Miljanovci Миљановци
- Village
- Location within Bosnia and Herzegovina
- Country: Bosnia and Herzegovina
- Entity: Federation of Bosnia and Herzegovina
- Canton: Tuzla
- Municipality: Kalesija

Area
  - Total: 2.53 sq mi (6.55 km^{2})

Population (2013)
  - Total: 1,918
  - Density: 758/sq mi (293/km^{2})

Miljanovci (Cyrillic: Миљановци) is a village in the municipality of Kalesija, Bosnia and Herzegovina.

== Demographics ==
According to the 2013 census, its population was 1,918.

Ethnicity in 2013
Ethnicity	Number	Percentage
Bosniaks	1,896	98.8%
other/undeclared	22	1.1%
Total	1,918	100%
