= Rainci Gornji =

Rainci Gornji Раинци Горњи
- Village
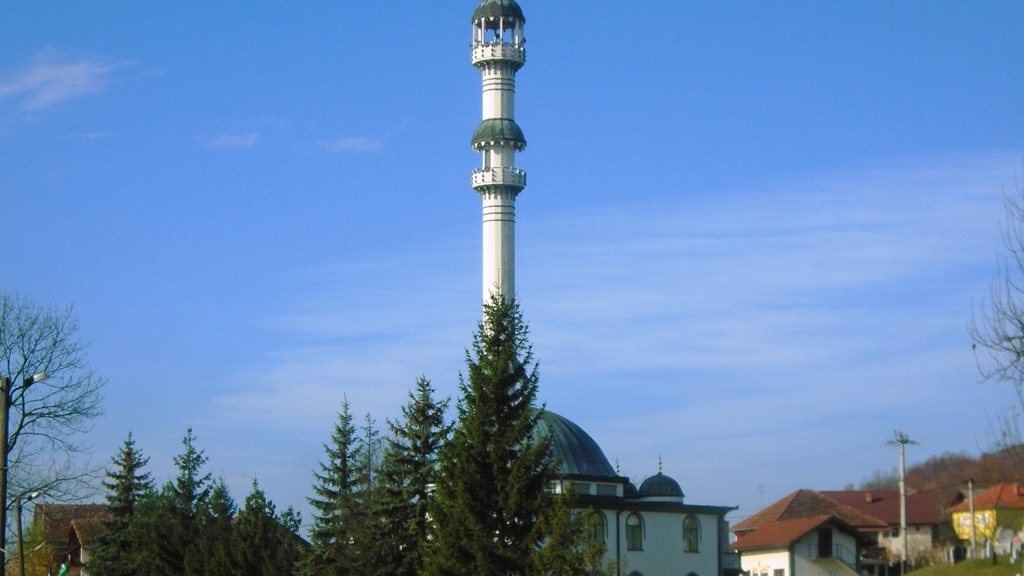

- Location within Bosnia and Herzegovina
- Country: Bosnia and Herzegovina
- Entity: Federation of Bosnia and Herzegovina
- Canton: Tuzla
- Municipality: Kalesija

Area
  - Total: 1.63 sq mi (4.23 km^{2})

Population (2013)
  - Total: 1,924
  - Density: 1,180/sq mi (455/km^{2})

Rainci Gornji (Cyrillic: Раинци Горњи) is a village in the municipality of Kalesija, Bosnia and Herzegovina.

== Demographics ==
According to the 2013 census, its population was 1,924.

Ethnicity in 2013
Ethnicity	Number	Percentage
Bosniaks	1,886	98.0%
Croats	1	0.1%
Serbs	2	0.1%
other/undeclared	35	1.8%
Total	1,924	100%
