= Brezik, Kalesija =

Brezik Брезик
- Village
- Location within Bosnia and Herzegovina
- Coordinates: 44°26′35″N 18°56′16″E
- Country: Bosnia and Herzegovina
- Entity: Federation of Bosnia and Herzegovina
- Canton: Tuzla
- Municipality: Kalesija

Area
  - Total: 1.14 sq mi (2.96 km^{2})

Population (2013)
  - Total: 51
  - Density: 45/sq mi (17/km^{2})

Brezik (Cyrillic: Брезик) is a village in the municipality of Kalesija, Bosnia and Herzegovina.

== Demographics ==
According to the 2013 census, its population was 51.

Ethnicity in 2013
Ethnicity	Number	Percentage
Bosniaks	6	11.8%
Croats	1	2.0%
Serbs	44	86.3%
Total	51	100%
