= Zolje =

- Village
- Location within Bosnia and Herzegovina
- Coordinates: 44.4564364°N 18.8948751°E
- Country: Bosnia and Herzegovina
- Entity: Federation of Bosnia and Herzegovina
- Canton: Tuzla
- Municipality: Kalesija

Area
  - Total: 6.08 sq mi (15.75 km^{2})

Population (2013)
  - Total: 823
  - Density: 135/sq mi (52.3/km^{2})

Zolje is a village in the municipality of Kalesija, Bosnia and Herzegovina.

== Demographics ==
According to the 2013 census, its population was 823.

Ethnicity in 2013
Ethnicity	Number	Percentage
Bosniaks	806	97.9%
Serbs	10	1.2%
Croats	1	0.1%
other/undeclared	6	0.7%
Total	823	100%
