= Vukovije Gornje =

Vukovije Gornje Вуковије Горње
- Village
- Location within Bosnia and Herzegovina
- Country: Bosnia and Herzegovina
- Entity: Federation of Bosnia and Herzegovina
- Canton: Tuzla
- Municipality: Kalesija

Area
  - Total: 3.54 sq mi (9.18 km^{2})

Population (2013)
  - Total: 2,511
  - Density: 708/sq mi (274/km^{2})

Vukovije Gornje (Cyrillic: Вуковије Горње) is a village in the municipality of Kalesija, Bosnia and Herzegovina.

== Demographics ==
According to the 2013 census, its population was 2,511.

Ethnicity in 2013
| Ethnicity | Number | Percentage |
|---|---|---|
| Bosniaks | 2,488 | 99.1% |
| Croats | 4 | 0.2% |
| other/undeclared | 19 | 0.8% |
| Total | 2,511 | 100% |
