= Kikači =

- Village
- Location within Bosnia and Herzegovina
- Country: Bosnia and Herzegovina
- Entity: Federation of Bosnia and Herzegovina
- Canton: Tuzla
- Municipality: Kalesija

Area
  - Total: 2.64 sq mi (6.85 km^{2})

Population (2013)
  - Total: 1,804
  - Density: 682/sq mi (263/km^{2})
- Postal code: 75265

Kikači is a village in the municipality of Kalesija, Bosnia and Herzegovina.

Its subregions include: Kundakovići, Gornji Kikači and Polje. Located in Kikači are an elementary school for first to fifth grade children, a mosque and the football stadium Tom Cat Arena - home ground of the local FK Mladost Kikači.

== Demographics ==
According to the 2013 census, its population was 1,804.

Ethnicity in 2013
Ethnicity	Number	Percentage
Bosniaks	1,797	99.6%
other/undeclared	7	0.4%
Total	1,804	100%
