= Kalesija Selo =

- Village
- Location within Bosnia and Herzegovina
- Coordinates: 44°26′03″N 18°53′44″E
- Country: Bosnia and Herzegovina
- Entity: Federation of Bosnia and Herzegovina
- Canton: Tuzla
- Municipality: Kalesija

Area
  - Total: 2.90 sq mi (7.52 km^{2})

Population (2013)
  - Total: 2,222
  - Density: 765/sq mi (295/km^{2})

Kalesija Selo is a village in the municipality of Kalesija, Bosnia and Herzegovina.

== Demographics ==
According to the 2013 census, its population was 2,222.

Ethnicity in 2013
Ethnicity	Number	Percentage
Bosniaks	2,191	98.6%
Croats	1	0.0%
other/undeclared	30	1.4%
Total	2,222	100%
