= Staro Selo (Kalesija) =

Staro Selo Старо Село
- Village
- Location within Bosnia and Herzegovina
- Country: Bosnia and Herzegovina
- Entity: Federation of Bosnia and Herzegovina
- Canton: Tuzla
- Municipality: Kalesija

Area
  - Total: 0.29 sq mi (0.76 km^{2})

Population (2013)
  - Total: 22
  - Density: 75/sq mi (29/km^{2})

Staro Selo (Cyrillic: Старо Село) is a village in the municipality of Kalesija, Bosnia and Herzegovina.

== Demographics ==
According to the 2013 census, its population was 22.

Ethnicity in 2013
Ethnicity	Number	Percentage
Bosniaks	3	13.6%
other/undeclared	19	86.4%
Total	22	100%
