= Seljublje =

Seljublje Сељубље
- Village
- Location within Bosnia and Herzegovina
- Country: Bosnia and Herzegovina
- Entity: Federation of Bosnia and Herzegovina
- Canton: Tuzla
- Municipality: Kalesija

Area
  - Total: 3.80 sq mi (9.84 km^{2})

Population (2013)
  - Total: 923
  - Density: 243/sq mi (93.8/km^{2})

Seljublje (Cyrillic: Сељубље) is a village in the municipality of Kalesija, Bosnia and Herzegovina.

== Demographics ==
According to the 2013 census, its population was 923.

Ethnicity in 2013
Ethnicity	Number	Percentage
Bosniaks	918	99.5%
other/undeclared	5	0.5%
Total	923	100%
