= Rainci Donji =

Rainci Donji Раинци Доњи
- Village
- Location within Bosnia and Herzegovina
- Country: Bosnia and Herzegovina
- Entity: Federation of Bosnia and Herzegovina
- Canton: Tuzla
- Municipality: Kalesija

Area
  - Total: 6.08 sq mi (15.75 km^{2})

Population (2013)
  - Total: 2,268
  - Density: 373.0/sq mi (144.0/km^{2})

Rainci Donji (Cyrillic: Раинци Доњи) is a village in the municipality of Kalesija, Bosnia and Herzegovina.

== Demographics ==
According to the 2013 census, its population was 2,268.

Ethnicity in 2013
| Ethnicity | Number | Percentage |
|---|---|---|
| Bosniaks | 2,258 | 99.6% |
| other/undeclared | 10 | 0.4% |
| Total | 2,268 | 100% |
