= Jeginov Lug =

- Village
- Location within Bosnia and Herzegovina
- Coordinates: 44°26′N 18°47′E
- Country: Bosnia and Herzegovina
- Entity: Federation of Bosnia and Herzegovina
- Canton: Tuzla
- Municipality: Kalesija

Area
  - Total: 4.19 sq mi (10.84 km^{2})

Population (2013)
  - Total: 143
  - Density: 34.2/sq mi (13.2/km^{2})

Jeginov Lug is a village in the municipality of Kalesija, Bosnia and Herzegovina.

== Demographics ==
According to the 2013 census, its population was 143.

Ethnicity in 2013
Ethnicity	Number	Percentage
Bosniaks	113	79.0%
Serbs	30	21.0%
Total	143	100%
