= Zelina (Kalesija) =

- Village
- Location within Bosnia and Herzegovina
- Country: Bosnia and Herzegovina
- Entity: Federation of Bosnia and Herzegovina
- Region Canton: Bijeljina; Tuzla
- Municipality: Osmaci and Kalesija

Area
  - Total: 4.25 sq mi (11.02 km^{2})

Population (2013)
  - Total: 251
  - Density: 59.0/sq mi (22.8/km^{2})

Zelina is a village in the municipalities of Osmaci (Republika Srpska) and Kalesija, Bosnia and Herzegovina.

== Demographics ==
According to the 2013 census, Zelina had a population of 251, with 148 in the Osmaci part and 103 in the Kalesija part.

Ethnicity in 2013
Ethnicity	Number	Percentage
Serbs	156	62.2%
Bosniaks	93	37.1%
Croats	2	0.8%
Total	251	100%
