= Red Cross Society of Bosnia and Herzegovina =

Humanitarian non-governmental organization in Bosnia and Herzegovina

- Abbreviation: RCSBH
- Formation: 7 November 2001
- Type: Humanitarian aid organization
- Purpose: RCS BiH as a humanitarian organization of citizens of BiH
- Headquarters: Sarajevo, Bosnia and Herzegovina
- General Secretary: Rajko Lazić
- President: Husein Kličić
- Main organ: RCS BiH Assembly
- Parent organization: International Federation of Red Cross and Red Crescent Societies
- Staff: 13
- Volunteers: 500,000
- Website: rcsbh.org/index.php/en/

The Red Cross Society of Bosnia and Herzegovina (RCS BiH; Bosnian: Društvo Crvenog Krsta/Križa Bosne i Hercegovine) is a component of the International Red Cross and Red Crescent Movement (hereinafter: Movement). It was recognized by the International Committee of the Red Cross (ICRC) on 8 May 2001 and admitted as a member to the International Federation of Red Cross and Red Crescent Societies (IFRC) on 7 November 2001.

The relevant provisions of the law and the statutes define the RCS BiH as a humanitarian organization of citizens of BiH, recognized and authorized to pursue certain humanitarian goals, tasks and public authority with regard to health education activities, social protection, tracing service and other program activities in peace time and during natural and other disasters, emergency situations, in accordance with the principles of humanity, impartiality, neutrality, independence, voluntary service, unity and universality.

RCS BiH is the only Red Cross organization which is operational throughout the entire territory of Bosnia and Herzegovina. It is composed of the Red Cross of the Federation of BiH, the Red Cross of Republika Srpska and the Red Cross of Brcko District BiH.

== Services ==
RCS BiH has modern, widely recognized and accepted programs. with its single network of Red Cross organizations and volunteers, which represent the foundation of the organization, RCS BiH, independently or in partnership with the governmental institutions or other non-governmental humanitarian organizations, has initiated and conducted a series of activities in response to the needs of the most vulnerable categories of population. Programs: Tracing service International cooperation Dissemination Children and youth Healthcare Disaster preparedness and response Mine risk education Social activity
