= Crni Vrh (Knjaževac) =

Crni Vrh Црни Врх
- Village
- Location within Serbia
- Coordinates: 43°24′20″N 22°35′06″E
- Country: Serbia
- District: Zaječar District
- Municipality: Knjaževac

Population (2002)
  - Total: 133
- Time zone: UTC+1 (CET)
  - Summer (DST): UTC+2 (CEST)

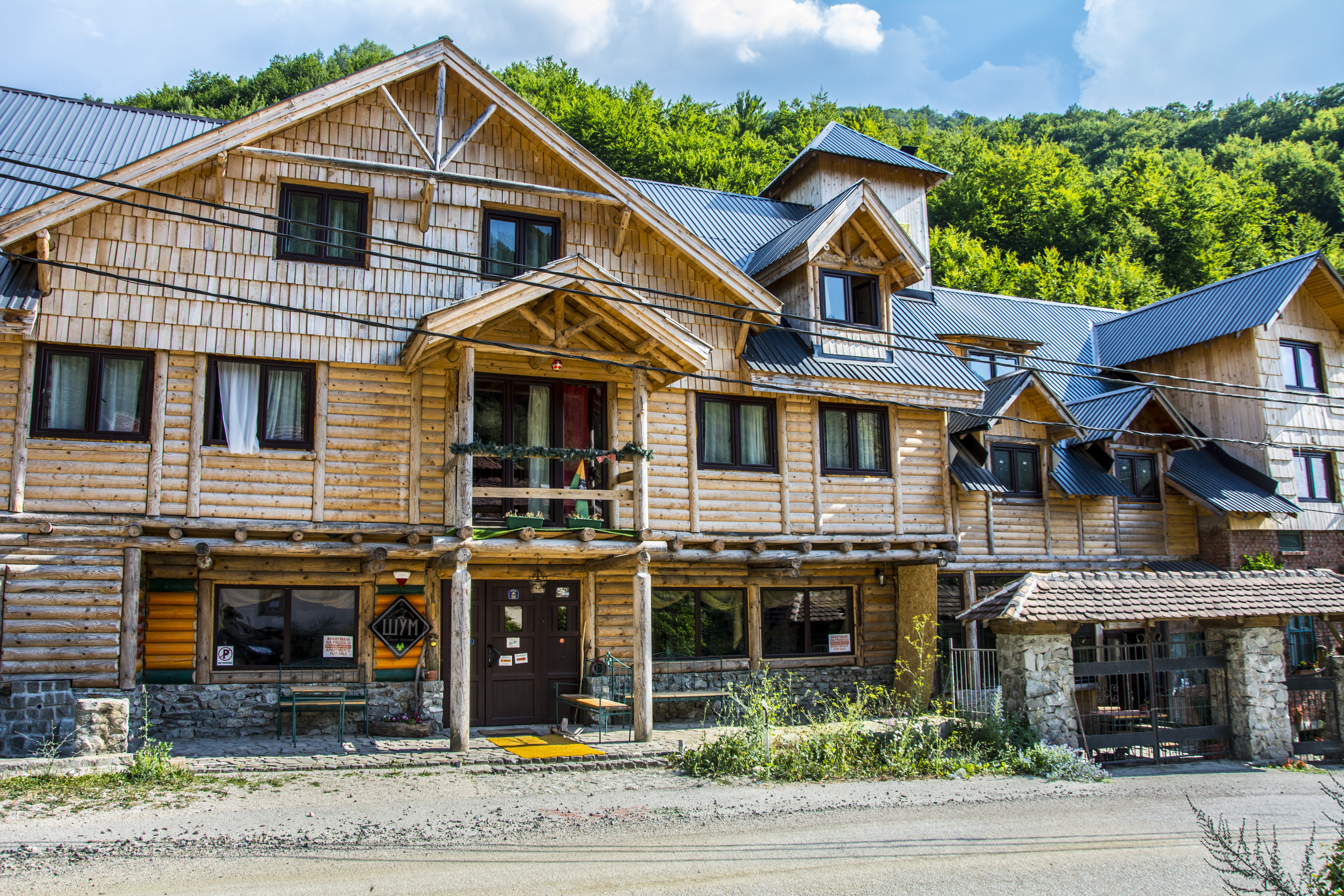

Crni Vrh is a village in the municipality of Knjaževac, Serbia. According to the 2002 census, the village has a population of 133 people.
