= Hrasno Donje =

- Village
- Location within Bosnia and Herzegovina
- Coordinates: 44°31′N 18°50′E
- Country: Bosnia and Herzegovina
- Entity: Federation of Bosnia and Herzegovina
- Canton: Tuzla
- Municipality: Kalesija

Area
  - Total: 2.24 sq mi (5.80 km^{2})

Population (2013)
  - Total: 1,022
  - Density: 456/sq mi (176/km^{2})

Hrasno Donje is a village in the municipality of Kalesija, Bosnia and Herzegovina.

== Demographics ==
According to the 2013 census, its population was 1,022.

Ethnicity in 2013
Ethnicity	Number	Percentage
Bosniaks	1,014	99.2%
Serbs	1	0.1%
other/undeclared	7	0.7%
Total	1,022	100%
