= Crni Vrh, Glamoč =

Crni Vrh Црни Врх
- Village
- Location within Bosnia and Herzegovina
- Coordinates: 44°15′00″N 16°38′27″E
- Country: Bosnia and Herzegovina
- Entity: Federation of Bosnia and Herzegovina
- Canton: Canton 10
- Municipality: Glamoč

Area
  - Total: 62.30 km^{2} (24.05 sq mi)

Population (2013)
  - Total: 19
  - Density: 0.30/km^{2} (0.79/sq mi)
- Time zone: UTC+1 (CET)
  - Summer (DST): UTC+2 (CEST)

Crni Vrh (Serbian Cyrillic: Црни Врх) is a village in the Municipality of Glamoč in Canton 10 of the Federation of Bosnia and Herzegovina, an entity of Bosnia and Herzegovina.

== Demographics ==
According to the 2013 census, its population was 19, all Serbs.

== Bibliography ==
- Ethnicity/National Affiliation, Religion and Mother Tongue (PDF). Sarajevo: Agency for Statistics of Bosnia and Herzegovina. 2019.
