= Zukići, Živinice =

Zukići Зукићи
- Village
- Location within Bosnia and Herzegovina
- Coordinates: 44.3676°N 18.6774°E
- Country: Bosnia and Herzegovina
- Entity: Federation of Bosnia and Herzegovina
- Canton: Tuzla
- Municipality: Živinice

Area
  - Total: 1.58 sq mi (4.09 km^{2})

Population (2013)
  - Total: 838
  - Density: 531/sq mi (205/km^{2})
- Time zone: UTC+1 (CET)
  - Summer (DST): UTC+2 (CEST)

Zukići is a village in the municipality of Živinice, Bosnia and Herzegovina.

== Demographics ==
According to the 2013 census, its population was 838.

Ethnicity in 2013
| Ethnicity | Number | Percentage |
|---|---|---|
| Bosniaks | 825 | 98.4% |
| Serbs | 4 | 0.5% |
| other/undeclared | 9 | 1.1% |
| Total | 838 | 100% |
