= Črni Vrh v Tuhinju =

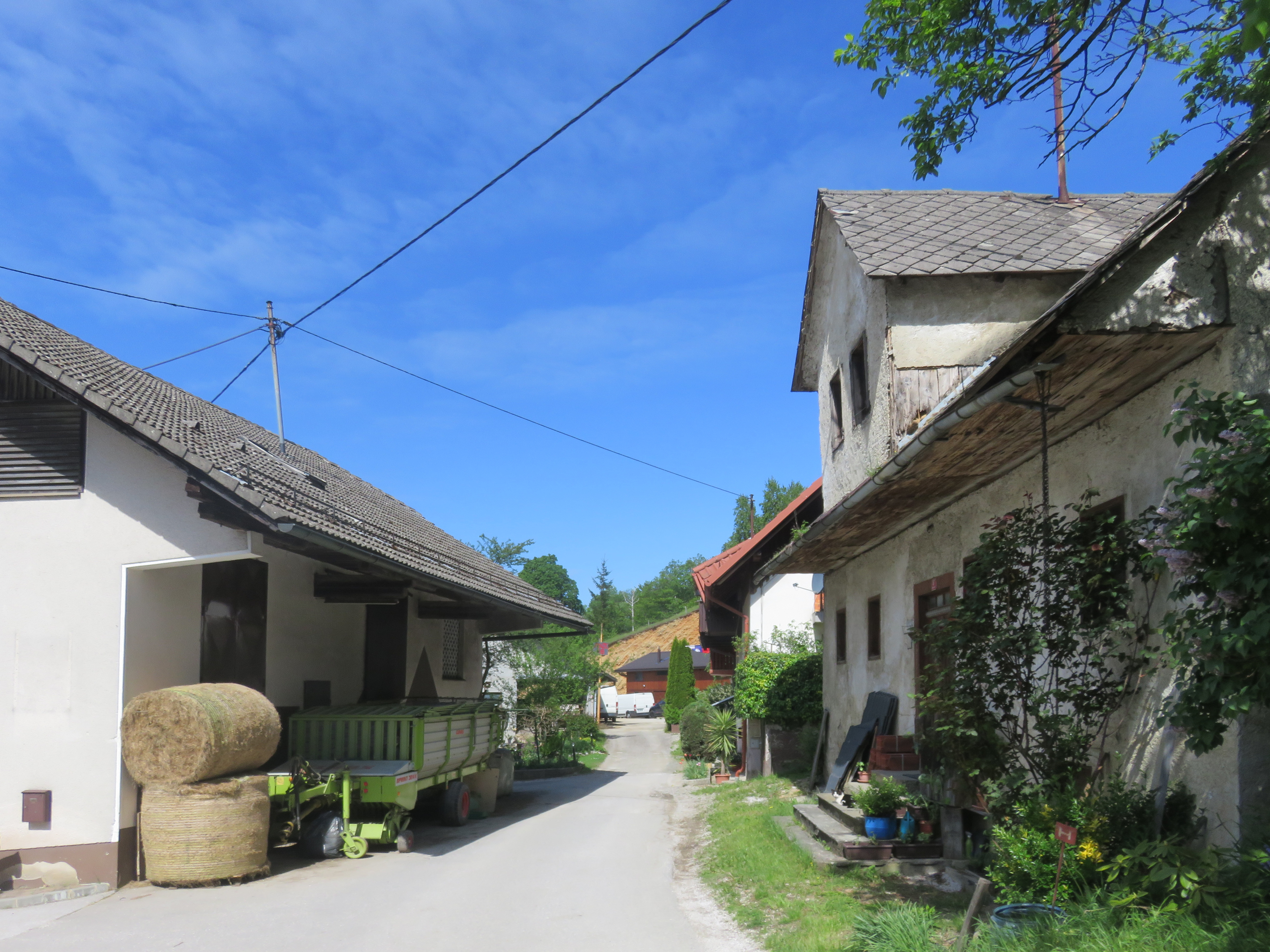

- Location in Slovenia
- Coordinates: 46°13′7.77″N 14°47′56.26″E
- Country: Slovenia
- Traditional region: Upper Carniola
- Statistical region: Central Slovenia
- Municipality: Kamnik
- Elevation: 712.1 m (2,336 ft)

Population (2002)
  - Total: 25

Črni Vrh v Tuhinju (pronounced [ˈtʃəɾni ˈʋəɾx ʍ tuˈxiːnju]) is a small settlement in the Tuhinj Valley in the Municipality of Kamnik in the Upper Carniola region of Slovenia.

== Name ==
The name of the settlement was changed from Črni Vrh to Črni Vrh v Tuhinju in 1953.
