= Tojšići =

- Town
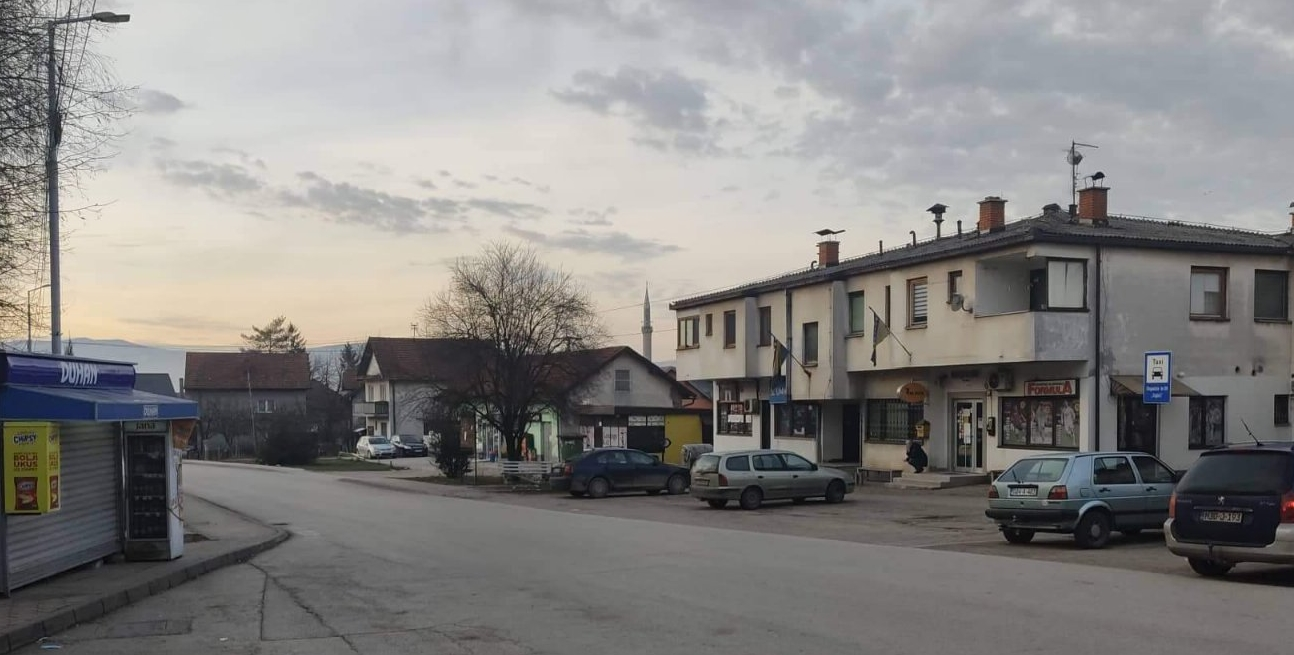
- A street in Tojšići

- Location within Bosnia and Herzegovina
- Country: Bosnia and Herzegovina
- Entity: Federation of Bosnia and Herzegovina
- Canton: Tuzla
- Municipality: Kalesija

Area
  - Total: 2.51 sq mi (6.50 km^{2})

Population (2013)
  - Total: 2,484
  - Density: 990/sq mi (382/km^{2})

Tojšići is a town in the municipality of Kalesija, Bosnia and Herzegovina.

== Demographics ==
According to the 2013 census, its population was 2,484.

Ethnicity in 2013
Ethnicity	Number	Percentage
Bosniaks	2,424	97.6%
Serbs	2	0.1%
other/undeclared	58	2.3%
Total	2,484	100%
