= Hrasno Gornje =

Hrasno Gornje Храсно Горње
- Village
- Location within Bosnia and Herzegovina
- Country: Bosnia and Herzegovina
- Entity: Federation of Bosnia and Herzegovina
- Canton: Tuzla
- Municipality: Kalesija

Area
  - Total: 4.31 sq mi (11.15 km^{2})

Population (2013)
  - Total: 627
  - Density: 146/sq mi (56.2/km^{2})

Hrasno Gornje (Cyrillic: Храсно Горње) is a village in the municipality of Kalesija, Bosnia and Herzegovina.

== Demographics ==
According to the 2013 census, its population was 627.

Ethnicity in 2013
| Ethnicity | Number | Percentage |
|---|---|---|
| Bosniaks | 626 | 99.8% |
| other/undeclared | 1 | 0.2 |
| Total | 627 | 100% |
