= Zukići (Kalesija) =

Zukići Зукићи
- Village
- Location within Bosnia and Herzegovina
- Coordinates: 44°27′28″N 18°56′30″E
- Country: Bosnia and Herzegovina
- Entity: Federation of Bosnia and Herzegovina
- Canton: Tuzla
- Municipality: Kalesija

Area
  - Total: 0.71 sq mi (1.84 km^{2})

Population (2013)
  - Total: 239
  - Density: 336/sq mi (130/km^{2})

Zukići (Cyrillic: Зукићи) is a village in the municipality of Kalesija, Bosnia and Herzegovina.

== Demographics ==
According to the 2013 census, its population was 239, all Bosniaks.
