= Dubnica (Kalesija) =

Dubnica Дубница
- Village
- Location within Bosnia and Herzegovina
- Country: Bosnia and Herzegovina
- Entity: Federation of Bosnia and Herzegovina
- Canton: Tuzla
- Municipality: Kalesija

Area
  - Total: 7.81 sq mi (20.22 km^{2})

Population (2013)
  - Total: 788
  - Density: 101/sq mi (39.0/km^{2})

Dubnica (Serbian Cyrillic: Дубница) is a village in the municipality of Kalesija, Bosnia and Herzegovina.

== Demographics ==
According to the 2013 census, its population was 788.

Ethnicity in 2013
Ethnicity	Number	Percentage
Bosniaks	762	96.7%
Serbs	22	2.8%
other/undeclared	4	0.5%
Total	788	100%
