= Crni Vrh (Medveđa) =

Crni Vrh Црни Врх (Serbian)
- Village
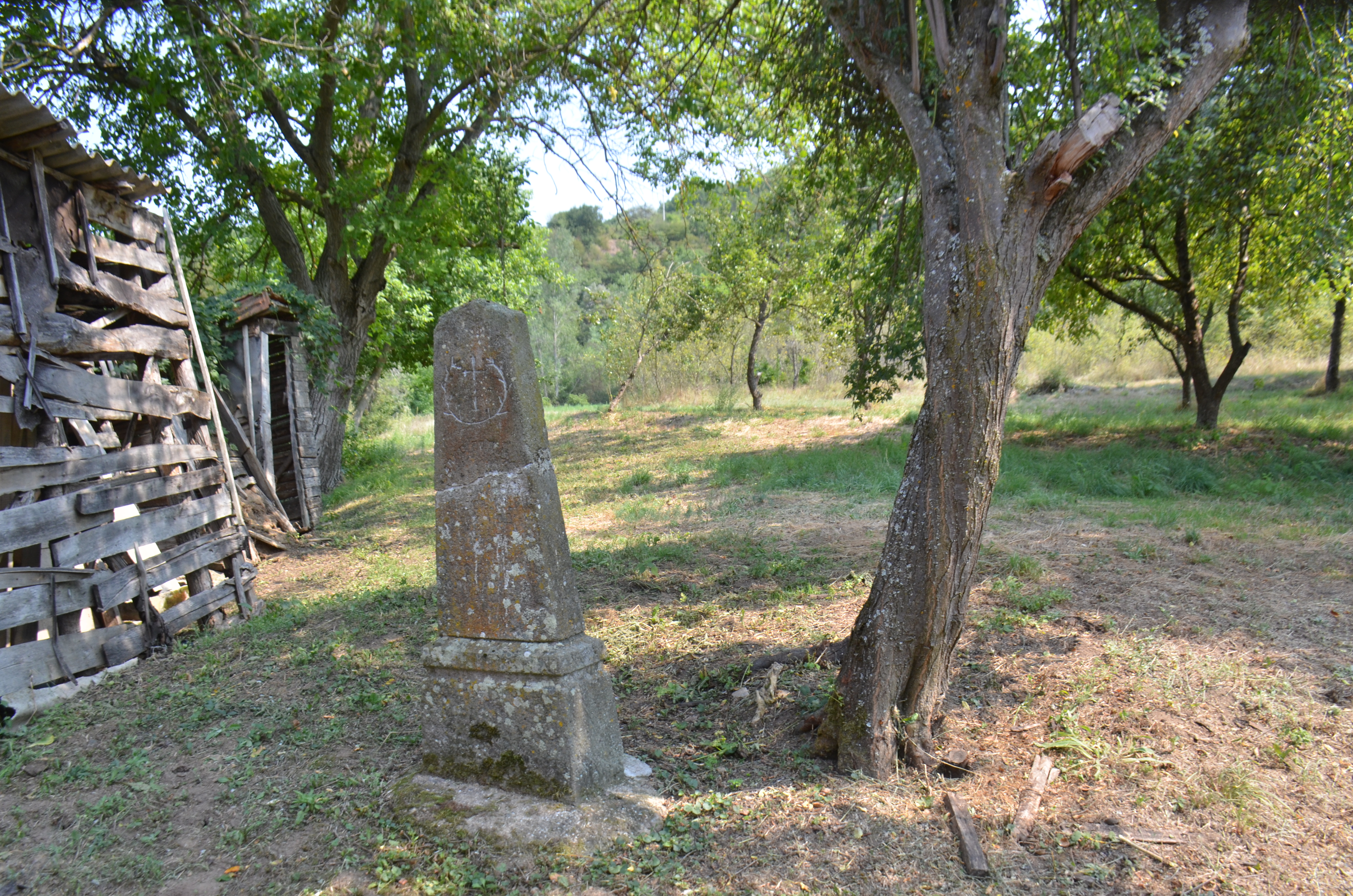

- Location within Serbia
- Coordinates: 42°52′07″N 21°37′03″E
- Country: Serbia
- District: Jablanica District
- Municipality: Medveđa

Population (2002)
  - Total: 141
- Time zone: UTC+1 (CET)
  - Summer (DST): UTC+2 (CEST)

Crni Vrh is a village in the municipality of Medveđa, Serbia. According to the 2002 census, the village has a population of 141 people.
