= Crni Vrh (Zvornik) =

- Location within Bosnia and Herzegovina

Highest point
- Coordinates: 44°21′20″N 19°03′15″E

Geography
- Location: Bosnia and Herzegovina

Crni Vrh (English Black Peak) is a mountain in eastern Bosnia and Herzegovina, near Zvornik. A mass grave containing Bosniak victims of the Bosnian War was uncovered on mountain slope near Snagovo.

A road sign on Mount Crni Vrh pointing to Snagovo.

== Mass grave ==
A mass grave containing 629 Bosniak victims, killed by Serb forces during the Bosnian War, was uncovered on Crni Vrh in 2003.
