= Memići (Kalesija) =

Memići Мемићи
- Village
- Location within Bosnia and Herzegovina
- Country: Bosnia and Herzegovina
- Entity: Federation of Bosnia and Herzegovina
- Canton: Tuzla
- Municipality: Kalesija

Area
  - Total: 4.01 sq mi (10.39 km^{2})

Population (2013)
  - Total: 1,453
  - Density: 362.2/sq mi (139.8/km^{2})

Memići is a village in the municipality of Kalesija, Bosnia and Herzegovina.

== Demographics ==
According to the 2013 census, its population was 1,453.

Ethnicity in 2013
Ethnicity	Number	Percentage
Bosniaks	1,383	95.2%
Serbs	15	1.0%
other/undeclared	55	3.8%
Total	1,453	100%
