= Kalesija =

Kalesija Калесија
- Town and municipality
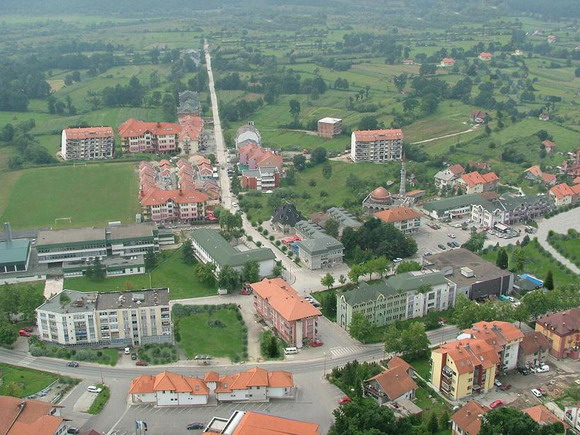
- Panorama of the town

- Coat of arms

- Location of Kalesija within Bosnia and Herzegovina.
- Coordinates: 44°27′N 18°52′E
- Country: Bosnia and Herzegovina
- Entity: Federation of Bosnia and Herzegovina
- Canton: Tuzla Canton

Government
  - Municipal mayor: Nermin Mujkanović (SDA)

Area
  - Total: 201 km^{2} (78 sq mi)

Population (2013 census)
  - Total: 2,039
  - Density: 183/km^{2} (470/sq mi)
  - Municipality: 33,053
- Time zone: UTC+1 (CET)
  - Summer (DST): UTC+2 (CEST)
- Area code: +387 35
- Website: www.kalesija.ba

Kalesija (Serbian Cyrillic: Калесија) is a town and municipality located in the Tuzla Canton of the Federation of Bosnia and Herzegovina, an entity of Bosnia and Herzegovina. It is located in northeastern Bosnia and Herzegovina, east of Tuzla. As of 2013, the town has a population of 2,039 inhabitants, while the municipality has 33,053 inhabitants.

== History ==
The Atik Mosque in Vukovije Gornje was built at the end of the 16th century.

=== Yugoslav Wars ===
On 2 May 1992 Kalesija was one of the first Bosnian towns to be caught in the initial Serbian offensive. On 11 May 1992, Kalesija and the territory east of the river Bjeljevac except for the settlements of Zukići and Jajić were placed under occupation.

On 23 May 1992, Kalesija was retaken by Bosnian forces.

The aftermath of the occupation included ethnic cleansing, population displacement, many people being taken to camps, the destruction of Kalesija villages, the destruction of religious buildings and industrial plants.

The Dayton Agreement appointed a new administrative arrangement of Bosnia and Herzegovina. 71 km2 (26.1%) of the territory of the municipality Kalesija was ceded to Republika Srpska, becoming the municipality of Osmaci.

== Demographics ==
=== 1971 ===
The 1971 Yugoslav census showed that Kalesija had 32,577 inhabitants, made up of:

- 24,771 Bosniaks - (76.03%)
- 7,606 Serbs - (23.34%)
- 40 Croats - (0.12%)
- 23 Yugoslavs - (0.07%)
- 137 others - (0.44%)

=== 1991 ===
In the 1991 census, the municipality of Kalesija had 41,795 inhabitants:

- 33,226 Bosniaks (79.5%)
- 7,669 Serbs (18.4%)
- 33 Croats (0.1%)
- 270 Yugoslavs (0.6%)
- 597 others (0.4%)

=== 2013 ===
In the 2013 census, the municipality of Kalesija had 33,053 inhabitants:

- 32,227 Bosniaks (97,5%)
- 254 Serbs (0,76%)
- 20 Croats (0,06%)
- 552 others (1,67%)

== Settlements ==
The municipality consists of 28 settlements:

- Brezik, population 51
- Bulatovci, population 302
- Dubnica, population 788
- Gojčin, population 421
- Hrasno Donje, population 1,022
- Hrasno Gornje, population 627
- Jeginov Lug, population 143
- Jelovo Brdo, population 489
- Kalesija Grad, population 2,039
- Kalesija Selo, population 2,222
- Kikači, population 1,804
- Lipovice, population 1,158
- Memići, population 1,453
- Miljanovci, population 1,918
- Osmaci, uninhabited
- Petrovice, population 2,460
- Prnjavor, population 1,515
- Rainci Donji, population 2,268
- Rainci Gornji, population 1,924
- Sarači, population 470
- Seljublje, population 923
- Staro Selo, population 22
- Tojšići, population 2,484
- Vukovije Donje, population 2,874
- Vukovije Gornje, population 2,511
- Zelina, population 103
- Zolje, population 823
- Zukići, population 239

== Education ==
In the area of the Kalesija municipality there are six elementary schools. They are located in Kalesija, Rainci Gornji, Gojčin, Memići, Vukovije and Tojšići.
