= Osmaci =

Village and municipality in Bosnia and Herzegovina

Osmaci Осмаци
- Village and municipality
- Location of Osmaci within Bosnia and Herzegovina

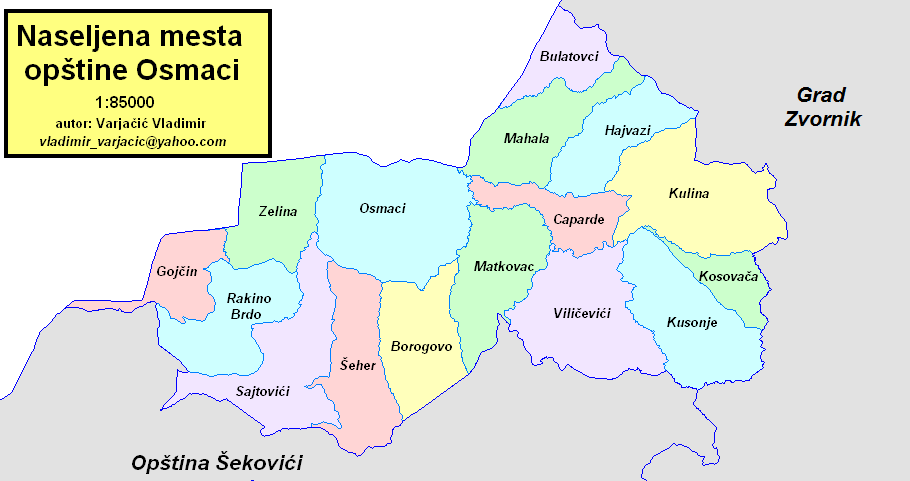
- Coordinates: 44°24′05″N 18°55′03″E
- Country: Bosnia and Herzegovina
- Entity: Republika Srpska

Government
  - Municipal mayor: Radan Sarić (SNSD)

Area
  - Total: 78.1 km^{2} (30.2 sq mi)

Population (2013 census)
  - Total: 6,016
  - Density: 77.0/km^{2} (200/sq mi)
- Time zone: UTC+1 (CET)
  - Summer (DST): UTC+2 (CEST)
- Area code: 56

Osmaci (Serbian Cyrillic: Осмаци) is a village and municipality in Republika Srpska, Bosnia and Herzegovina. As of 2013, it has a population of 6,016 inhabitants. There is also a small, uninhabited, part of Osmaci that is in Kalesija municipality.

== History ==
The municipality was created from part of the territory of the pre-war municipality of Kalesija that was assigned to Republika Srpska by the Dayton Agreement. The rest of the Kalesija municipality is in the Federation.

== Demographics ==
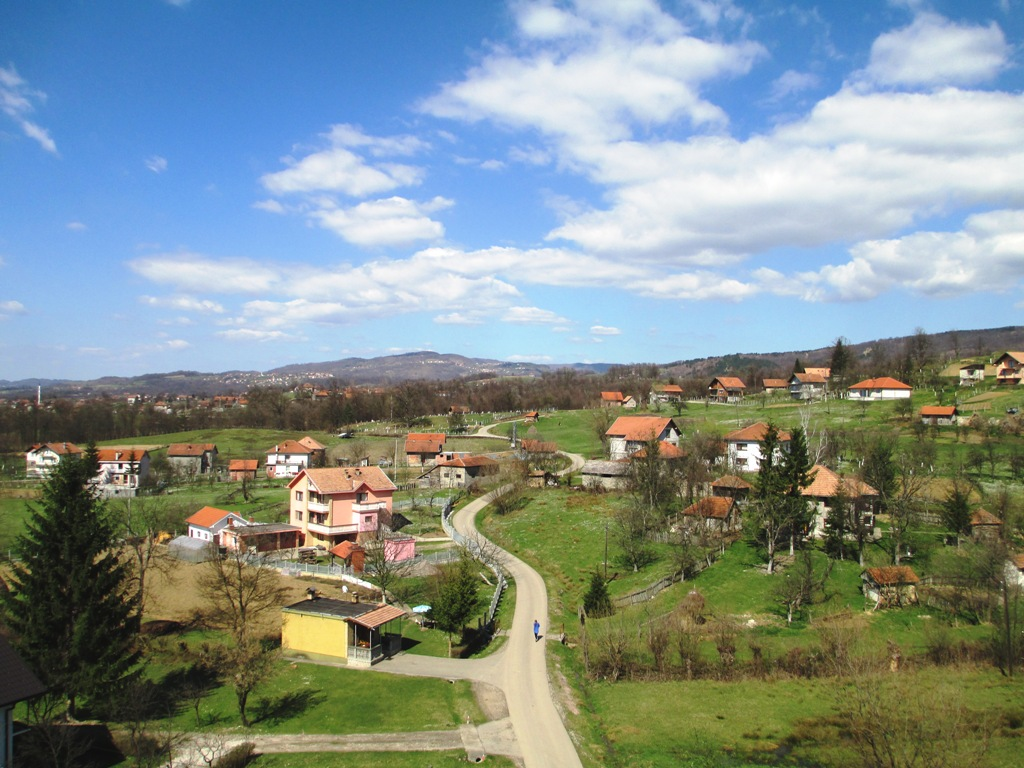
A village in Osmaci

=== Population ===
Population of settlements – Osmaci municipality
| | Settlement | 1971. | 1981. | 1991. | 2013. |
| | Total | | | | 6,016 |
| 1 | Borogovo | | | 276 | 252 |
| 2 | Caparde | | | 855 | 909 |
| 3 | Hajvazi | | | 569 | 504 |
| 4 | Mahala | | | 626 | 578 |
| 5 | Matkovac | | | 491 | 347 |
| 6 | Osmaci | 800 | 709 | 844 | 1,029 |
| 7 | Rakino Brdo | | | 239 | 222 |
| 8 | Sajtovići | | | 353 | 232 |
| 9 | Šeher | | | 1,187 | 579 |
| 10 | Viličevići | | | 555 | 394 |

=== Ethnic composition ===
Ethnic composition – Osmaci village
| | 2013. | 1991. | 1981. | 1971. |
| Total | 998 (100%) | 844 (100%) | 709 (100%) | 800 (100%) |
| Serbs | 846 (84.8%) | 798 (94.55%) | 702 (99.01%) | 796 (99.5%) |
| Bosniaks | 148 (14.8%) | 35 (41.47%) | | |
| Others | 2 (0.2%) | 7 (0.829%) | | 4 (0.5%) |
| Yugoslavs | | 3 (0.355%) | 6 (0.846%) | |
| Croats | 2 (0.2%) | 1 (0.118%) | 1 (0.141%) | |

Ethnic composition – Osmaci municipality
| | 2013. |
| Total | 6,016 (100,0%) |
| Serbs | 3,095 (51,45%) |
| Bosniaks | 2,895 (48,12%) |
| Others | 17 (0,283%) |
| Croats | 9 (0,150%) |

== Mass grave ==
In the village Hajvazi, located in Osmaci, on 20 September 2012, the International Commission on Missing Persons uncovered a mass grave containing the remains of eight Bosnian Muslim individuals, seven men and one woman killed by Serbs in November 1992 during the Bosnian War. The victims were piled atop of each other. Their remains were exhumed from the mass grave, which was located in the yard of a private house. The exhumation concluded on 27 September 2012 and the remains were transported to the Commemorative Centre in Tuzla for forensic testing and DNA analysis to determine the identity of the victims. Following the discovery of the eight victims, there are still an additional 30 Bosnian Muslim victims from the Osmaci area that remain missing.

On 1 June 2013, some of the victims found in the mass grave were buried in a Šehidsko mezarje (Martyr Cemetery) in Memići alongside victims found in the Crni Vrh mass grave and the mass grave in Kazanbašča by Zvornik.

== See also ==
- Municipalities of Republika Srpska
