= Ćatić =

Ćatić is a Bosnian surname. Notable people with the surname include:

- Amar Ćatić (born 1999), Bosnian footballer
- Adnan Catic (footballer) (born 2000), Swedish footballer of Bosnian descent
- Adnan Ćatić (born 1979), German boxer of Bosnian descent
- Bego Ćatić (born 1963), Bosnian footballer and manager
- Dženan Ćatić (born 1992), Bosnian-American footballer
- Sanela Diana Jenkins (née Ćatić), Bosnian entrepreneur and philanthropist
- Hajrudin Ćatić (born 1975), German–Bosnian footballer
- Musa Ćazim Ćatić (1878–1915), Bosnian writer and poet
- Ned Catic, former Australian rugby league player

== See also ==
- Čatići (Kakanj)
- Čatići (Banovići)
