= Banovići coal mine =

Coal mine in Bosnia and Herzegovina

Banovići Coal Mine
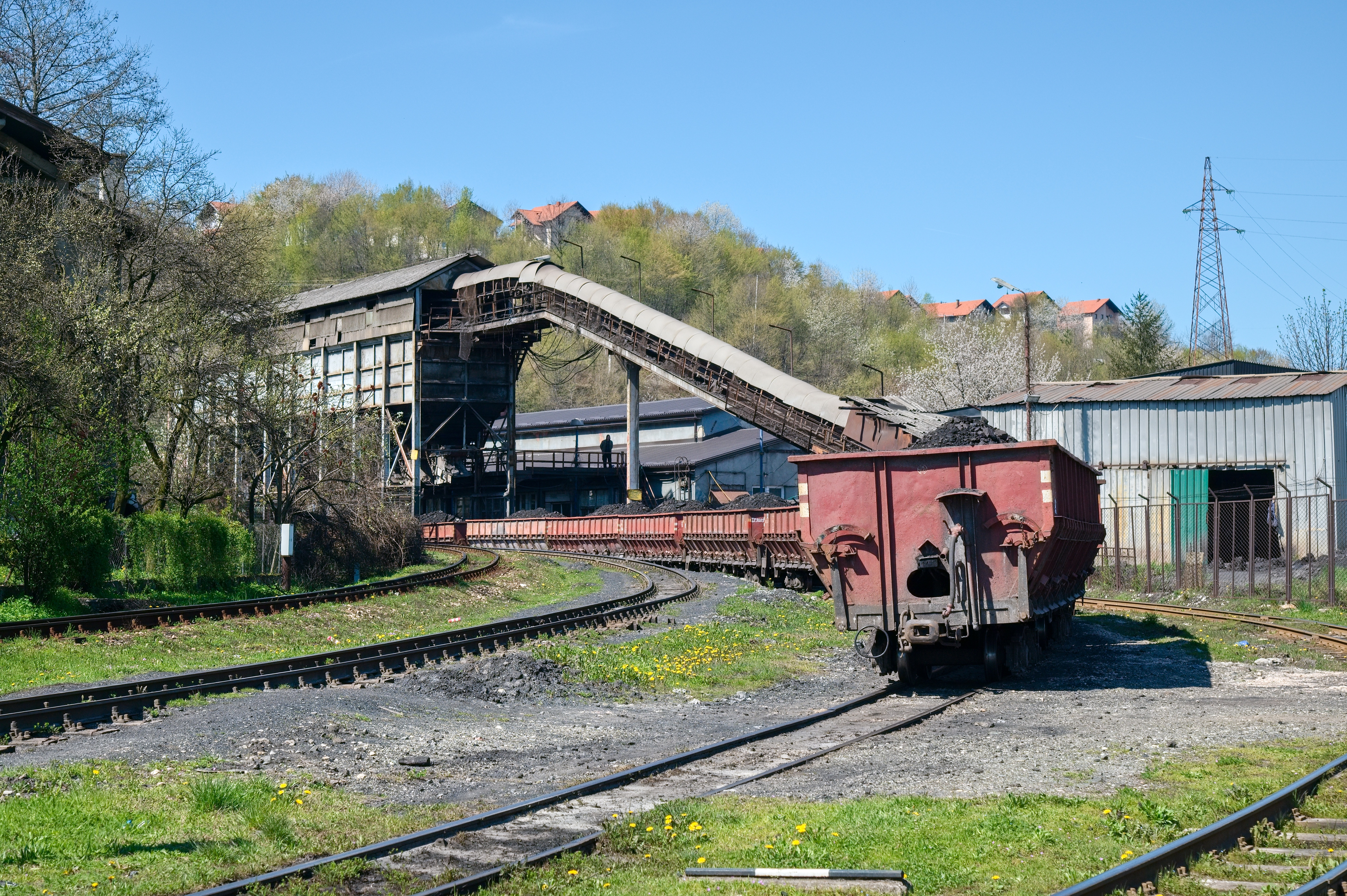
- Coal loading point in Banovići

- Location within Bosnia and Herzegovina
- Location: Omazići, Tuzla Canton, Bosnia and Herzegovina; 44°25′37″N 18°32′42″E
- Products: Lignite
- Production: 1.31 million tonnes of coal (2023)
- Company: RMU Banovići

The Banovići Coal Mine is a coal mine located in Banovići, in the Tuzla Canton. The mine consists of four brown coal mines, three surface mines: Čubrić, Turija and Grivice and the underground Omazići mine, and has coal reserves amounting to 208 million tonnes of lignite, which makes it one of the largest coal reserves in Europe and the world.

The mine, which is owned and operated by "RMU Banovići" majority owned by the Government of the Federation of Bosnia and Herzegovina. It has an annual production generation of 1.31 million tonnes of coal (as of 2023). Its coal is mainly used for the electricity generation at Tuzla Thermal Power Plant.

As of 2014, the mine still used steam locomotives on its railway.
