= Đurđevik coal mine =

Coal mine in Bosnia and Herzegovina

Đurđevik Coal Mine
- Location within Bosnia and Herzegovina
- Location: Đurđevik, Town of Živinice, Tuzla Canton, Federation of Bosnia and Herzegovina, Bosnia and Herzegovina; 44°23′57″N 18°38′57″E
- Products: Lignite
- Production: 589,000 tonnes of coal (2024)
- Company: Elektroprivreda Bosne i Hercegovine
- Website: www.rudnikdjurdjevik.ba

The Đurđevik Coal Mine is a coal mine located in the Tuzla Canton in the Federation of Bosnia and Herzegovina. It is owned and operated by Elektroprivreda Bosne i Hercegovine. The mine has coal reserves amounting to 75 million tonnes of lignite, one of the largest coal reserves in Europe and the world.

The mine has an annual production generation of 589,000 tonnes of coal (as of 2024). Its coal is mainly used for the electricity generation at Tuzla Thermal Power Plant.
