= Dunajevići =

- Village
- Location within Bosnia and Herzegovina
- Coordinates: 44.3860°N 18.6790°E
- Country: Bosnia and Herzegovina
- Entity: Federation of Bosnia and Herzegovina
- Canton: Tuzla
- Municipality: Živinice

Area
  - Total: 1.20 sq mi (3.11 km^{2})

Population (2013)
  - Total: 23
  - Density: 19/sq mi (7.4/km^{2})
- Time zone: UTC+1 (CET)
  - Summer (DST): UTC+2 (CEST)

Dunajevići is a village in the municipality of Živinice, Bosnia and Herzegovina.

== Demographics ==
According to the 2013 census, its population was 23.

Ethnicity in 2013
Ethnicity	Number	Percentage
Bosniaks	21	91.3%
Serbs	2	8.7%
Total	23	100%
