= Clinic for Pulmonary Diseases =

Department of Pulmonary Diseases
- University Clinical Center

- Location within Bosnia and Herzegovina

Geography
- Location: Slavinovići, Tuzla, Bosnia and Herzegovina
- Coordinates: 44°31′41″N 18°42′18″E

History
- Founded: 1953

Klinika za plućne bolesti (Department of Pulmonary Diseases) is a hospital specializing in lung diseases such as tuberculosis, lung cancer, bronchitis, etc. It was opened in 1953 in the Slavinovići neighborhood of Tuzla, Bosnia and Herzegovina. The hospital was renovated in 2006.

A plaque on the hospital that reads "This hospital was opened in the year 1953, and whose construction helped the miners of the Uglja, Tito, and Banovići mines, and the work of others from the Tuzla basin".

After 57 years, the hospital finally had heating installed in autumn 2010.
