= Višća Gornja =

- Village
- Location within Bosnia and Herzegovina
- Coordinates: 44.3666°N 18.5510°E
- Country: Bosnia and Herzegovina
- Entity: Federation of Bosnia and Herzegovina
- Canton: Tuzla
- Municipality: Živinice

Area
  - Total: 11.38 sq mi (29.48 km^{2})

Population (2013)
  - Total: 401
  - Density: 35.2/sq mi (13.6/km^{2})
- Time zone: UTC+1 (CET)
  - Summer (DST): UTC+2 (CEST)

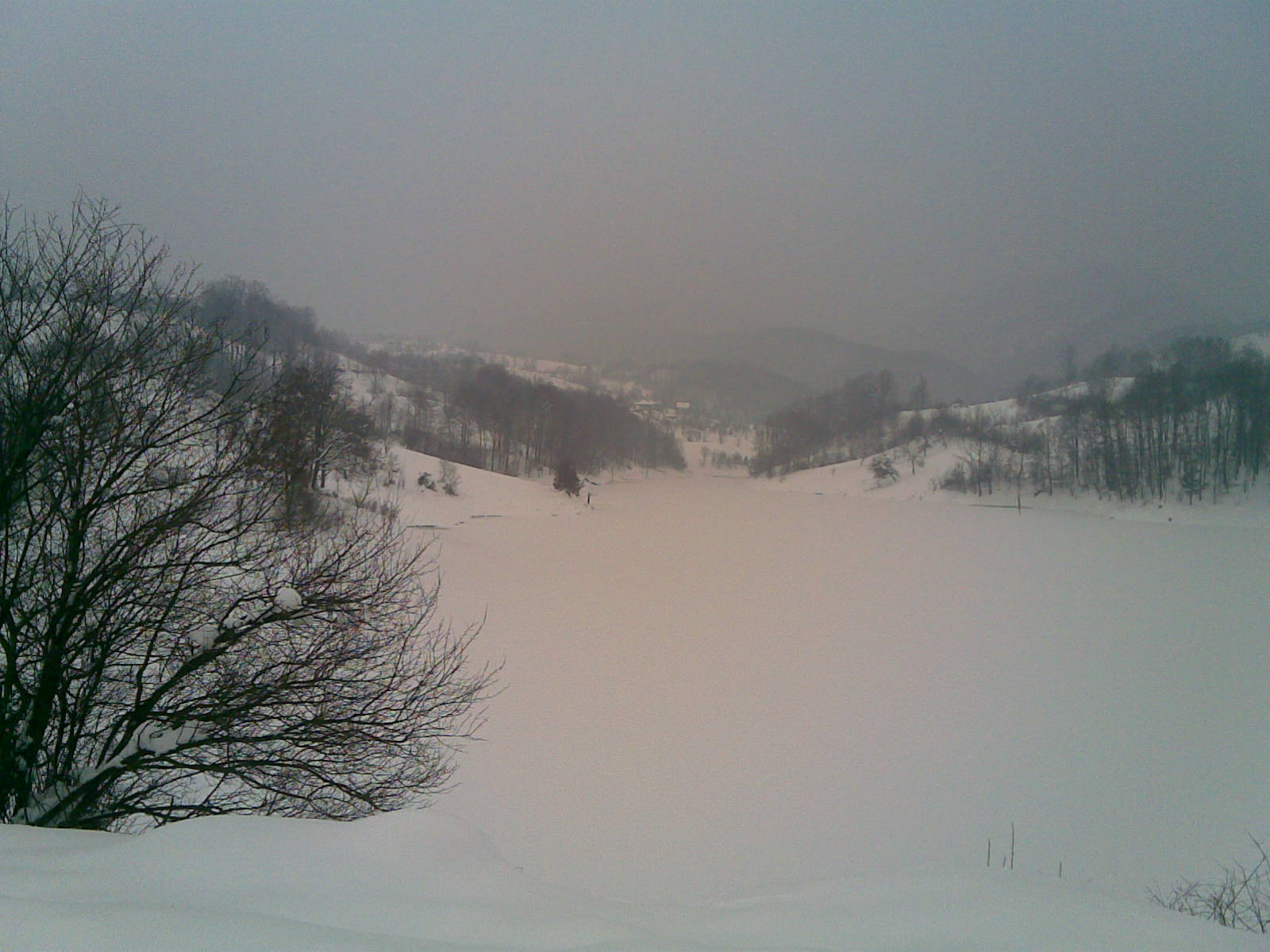

Višća Gornja is a village in the municipality of Živinice, Bosnia and Herzegovina.

== Demographics ==
According to the 2013 census, its population was 401.

Ethnicity in 2013
Ethnicity	Number	Percentage
Bosniaks	379	94.5%
Croats	1	0.2%
other/undeclared	21	5.2%
Total	401	100%
