= Svojat =

- Village
- Location within Bosnia and Herzegovina
- Coordinates: 44.4044°N 18.7209°E
- Country: Bosnia and Herzegovina
- Entity: Federation of Bosnia and Herzegovina
- Canton: Tuzla
- Municipality: Živinice

Area
  - Total: 1.64 sq mi (4.24 km^{2})

Population (2013)
  - Total: 664
  - Density: 406/sq mi (157/km^{2})
- Time zone: UTC+1 (CET)
  - Summer (DST): UTC+2 (CEST)

Svojat is a village in the municipality of Živinice, Bosnia and Herzegovina.

== Demographics ==
According to the 2013 census, its population was 664.

Ethnicity in 2013
Ethnicity	Number	Percentage
Bosniaks	652	98.2%
Serbs	10	1.5%
other/undeclared	2	0.3%
Total	664	100%
