= Vrnojevići =

- Village
- Location within Bosnia and Herzegovina
- Coordinates: 44.3829°N 18.6469°E
- Country: Bosnia and Herzegovina
- Entity: Federation of Bosnia and Herzegovina
- Canton: Tuzla
- Municipality: Živinice

Area
  - Total: 0.80 sq mi (2.08 km^{2})

Population (2013)
  - Total: 440
  - Density: 550/sq mi (210/km^{2})
- Time zone: UTC+1 (CET)
  - Summer (DST): UTC+2 (CEST)

Vrnojevići is a village in the municipality of Živinice, Bosnia and Herzegovina.

== Demographics ==
According to the 2013 census, its population was 440.

Ethnicity in 2013
Ethnicity	Number	Percentage
Bosniaks	426	96.8%
Serbs	6	1.4%
Croats	2	0.5%
other/undeclared	6	1.4%
Total	440	100%
