= Djedino =

- Village
- Location within Bosnia and Herzegovina
- Coordinates: 44.3756°N 18.6424°E
- Country: Bosnia and Herzegovina
- Entity: Federation of Bosnia and Herzegovina
- Canton: Tuzla
- Municipality: Živinice

Area
  - Total: 5.09 sq mi (13.19 km^{2})

Population (2013)
  - Total: 736
  - Density: 145/sq mi (55.8/km^{2})
- Time zone: UTC+1 (CET)
  - Summer (DST): UTC+2 (CEST)

Djedino is a village in the municipality of Živinice, Bosnia and Herzegovina.

== Demographics ==
According to the 2013 census, its population was 736.

Ethnicity in 2013
Ethnicity	Number	Percentage
Bosniaks	716	97.3%
other/undeclared	20	2.7%
Total	736	100%
