= Živinice Donje =

- Village
- Location within Bosnia and Herzegovina
- Coordinates: 44.4547°N 18.5969°E
- Country: Bosnia and Herzegovina
- Entity: Federation of Bosnia and Herzegovina
- Canton: Tuzla
- Municipality: Živinice

Area
  - Total: 2.20 sq mi (5.71 km^{2})

Population (2013)
  - Total: 2,223
  - Density: 1,010/sq mi (389/km^{2})
- Time zone: UTC+1 (CET)
  - Summer (DST): UTC+2 (CEST)

Živinice Donje is a village in the municipality of Živinice, Bosnia and Herzegovina.

== Demographics ==
According to the 2013 census, its population was 2,223.

Ethnicity in 2013
Ethnicity	Number	Percentage
Bosniaks	1,884	84.8%
Croats	260	11.7%
Serbs	1	0.0%
other/undeclared	78	3.5%
Total	2,223	100%
