= Banovići =

Banovići Бановићи
- Town and municipality
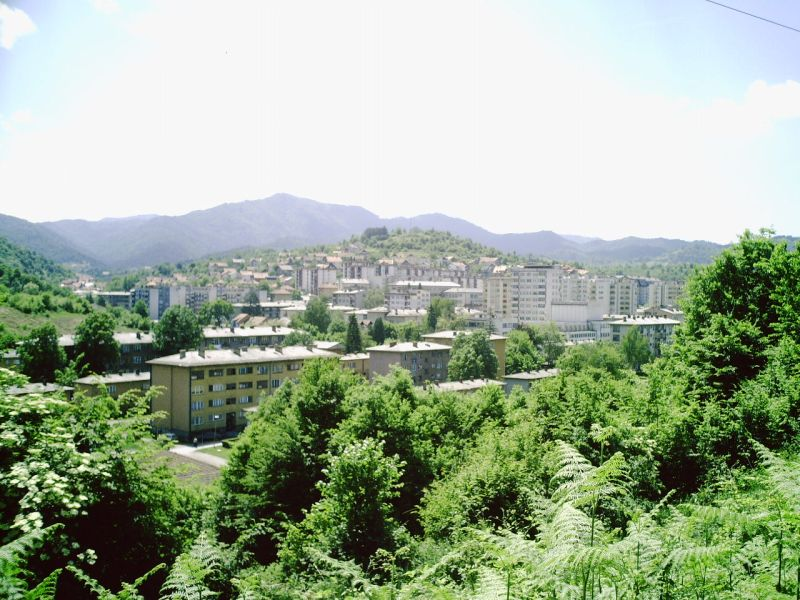
- View from "Vidikovac"

- Coat of arms

- Location of Banovići within Bosnia and Herzegovina.

- Location in Bosnia and Herzegovina
- Coordinates: 44°24′N 18°32′E
- Country: Bosnia and Herzegovina
- Entity: Federation of Bosnia and Herzegovina

Government
  - Municipal mayor: Mehmed Hasanović (PDA)

Area
  - Total: 185 km^{2} (71 sq mi)

Population (2013 census)
  - Total: 23,431
- Time zone: UTC+1 (CET)
  - Summer (DST): UTC+2 (CEST)
- Area code: +387 35
- Website: opcina-banovici.com.ba

Banovići (Serbian Cyrillic: Бановићи) is a town and municipality located in the Tuzla Canton, Federation of Bosnia and Herzegovina, Bosnia and Herzegovina. It is located in northeastern Bosnia and Herzegovina. The intensive development of Banovići began with the construction of the Brčko-Banovići railway in the year 1946. Due to its quality, brown coal from Banovići is well-known all over Europe.

== Geography ==
Banovići Municipality is situated on the foothills of the Konjuh mountain. The urban settlement of Banovići was built on the embankments of the Litva river. Its average altitude is 332 meters. The municipality encompasses 185 km^{2} and it includes the following settlements: Borovac, Banovići Selo, Ćatići, Milići, Mrgan, Repnik, Podgorje, Grivice, Treštenica Donja, Treštenica Gornja, Tulovići, Oskova, Željova, Omazići, Lozna, Seona, Pribitkovići, Stražbenica, and Gornji Bučik. According to the 1991 census, there were 26,507 inhabitants, of which 72% were Bosniaks, 17% Serbs, 2% Croats and 9% others. According to some estimates in 2000, the population of Banovići was about 29,000, and a considerable number of them were refugees.

== History ==
The oldest settlement known is located on the Gradina hill at Tulovići village, dating back to prehistoric times, according to remaining artefacts. There is a system of caves in the village of Pribitkovići, rich in cave adornments. The origin of the central settlement's name is revealed by a stećak in Banović selo, which, besides the ornaments and the lily flower carved into the stone, also has an inscription written in the Bosnian Cyrillic script. There were several necropolises of stećaks found, besides Banovići, that used to belong to the Dramešin county: Stražba, Draganja, and Treštenica. The county and the settlements are also mentioned by their respective names in Turkish sources. The name of the county was sustained until the 19th century. The intensive development of Banovići began with the construction of the Brčko-Banovići railway in 1946. There were only a few houses in the Banovići settlement, but by 1961 there were already 4,611 inhabitants. The settlement acquired all the features of a modern urban town environment. This is due to the exploitation of quality brown coal and the construction of a large number of industrial facilities in the metal and non-metal industry, as well as the construction of a modern road between Živinice and Zavidovići. Due to its quality, brown coal from Banovići is well-known all over Europe. The exploitation of brown coal is the basis of the further development of Banovići, as well as of the Tuzla Canton.

== Tourism ==
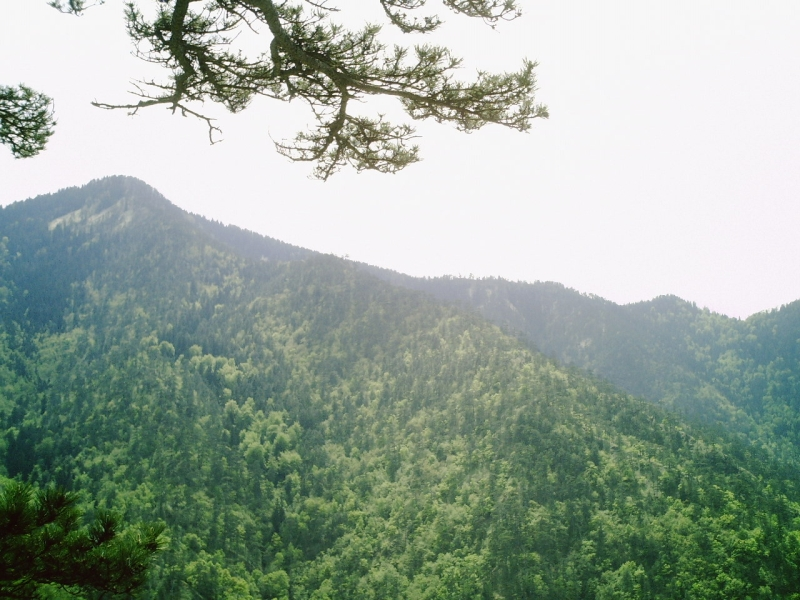
Konjuh mountain peak, 1328 m

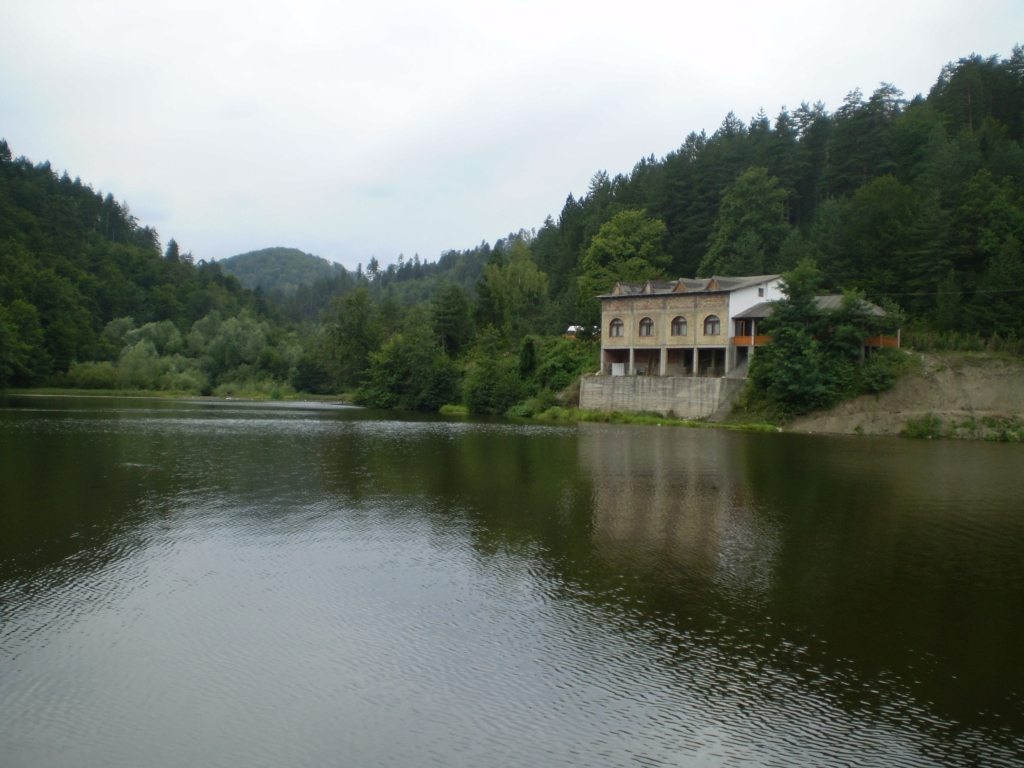
Breštica lake

The Municipality of Banovići has good preconditions for the development of tourism based on hunting on the slopes of Konjuh, as well as for the development of tourism based on fishing in several mountain rivers: the Oskova, the Krabanja, the Zlaća and the Studešnica. The „Zlaća“ mountain motel is one of the best mountain recreation facilities in the Tuzla Canton. The „Zobik“ mountain house is well known to all those in Bosnia and Herzegovina who like nature. In the village of Pribitkovići there is Borovac, an interesting series of caves rich with cave ornaments. The Konjuh Mountain is a habitat of the following animals: brown bears, deer, wolves, foxes, boars, capercaillies and squirrels.

== Economy ==
"RMU Banovići" is a Bosnian and Herzegovinan company principally engaged in the mining industry. The company’s main activities are: underground exploitation, surface exploitation, separation and distribution of brown coal. The company operates the Banovići mines and the coal separation facility in Oskova. "RMU Banovići" has about 2,600 employees. It is one of the most successful coal mining companies in Bosnia and ex-Yugoslavia. RMU sells 60% of its output to the Tuzla Thermal Power Plant (coal-fired) located nearby and also supplies coal to Bosnian households and exports to Croatia and Serbia. "RMU Banovići" has invested 40 million KM in modernising its equipment over the last few years, helping it generate combined profits of 20 million KM (convertible marks).

Other important companies are: "Helios" stove factory, "FGO" construction material factory, "Borac" clothing factory etc.

== Culture ==
The "Radnički Dom" (Workers Dome/Centre) is a centre for cultural events. The building includes a radio station, a city library, a theatre and a central restaurant. Radnički Dom is also the "home" of a mural with motifs from the Husinska buna (miners' rebellion in Husino), painted in the early 1960s by one of the greatest Bosnian and ex-Yugoslavian painters, Ismet Mujezinović.

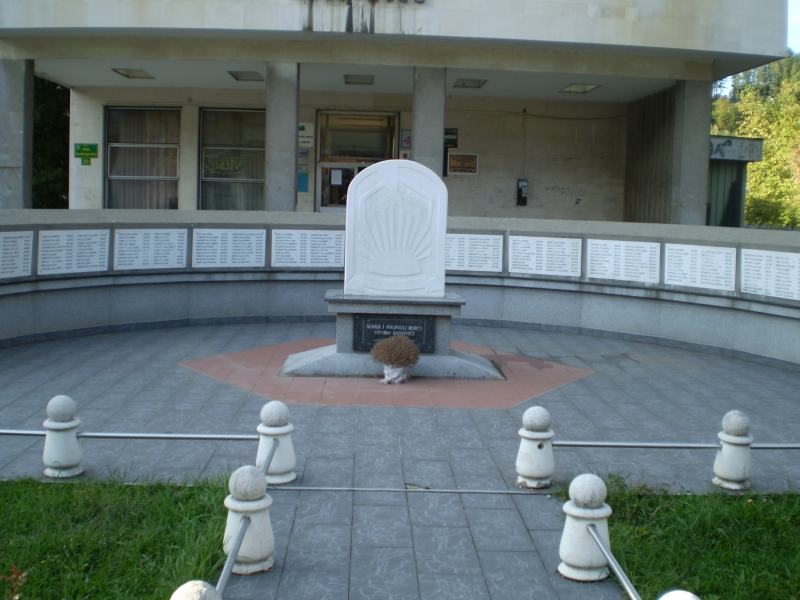
Monument dedicated to the shahids (martyrs) of Banovići

The city cinema hall has been renovated and bears a different name (BKC = Bosanski kulturni centar/Bosnian cultural centre).

A youth centre "Pinkland" was created in 1995 to fill some of the social, cultural, and recreational gaps (those gaps resulted from the War in Bosnia). The centre offers classes in computer science, music, painting, carpentry and dance, as well as sports, summer camps, and picnics to more than 1,600 members. Pinkland also cooperates with local schools, social authorities, the police and other non-governmental organizations. The most important international partners are the Government of Canada, Swiss Agency for Development and Cooperation (SDC), Finnish University Humak and Finnish NGO Etnokult.

=== Sports ===
FK Budućnost Banovići is the oldest sports club in the municipality of Banovići. In Bosnian "Budućnost" means "Future", which symbolizes the hope the people had for the times to come when the club was founded in 1947. The club plays at the Gradski Stadion (eng. City Stadium), which has a capacity of 5,000. Their primary colours are dark green and black. This club has entered the Republic league of Bosnia and Herzegovina in the 1978–79 season, which was their biggest success at that time.

Today, FK Budućnost Banovići is a member of the Football Association of Bosnia and Herzegovina. FK Budućnost were promoted to the Premier League of Bosnia and Herzegovina in the 1998–99 season. Later, in the 2000–01 season, Budućnost played against FK Drnovice from the Czech Republic. Budućnost now plays in the First League of the Federation of Bosnia and Herzegovina.

=== Scouting and mountaineering ===
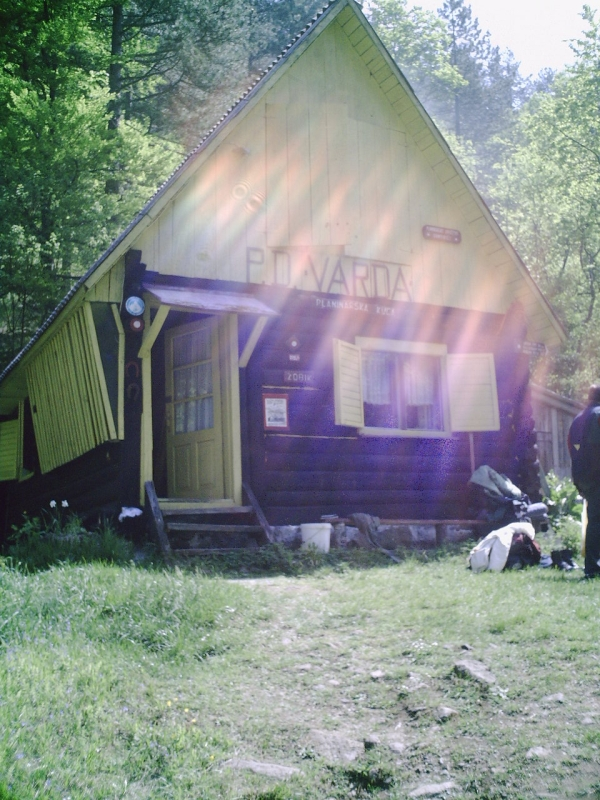
Mountaineering club "Varda"

The scouting community "Plamen" was formed on 1 September 1956. Since then the community has worked on the progress of non-formal life education, information and entertainment for young people through the promotion of scouting activities, the organization of scout competitions, picnics, summer camps and education about ecology. The community has 150 active members.

Mountaineering club "Varda" has existed for long time as well. Their member, Miralem Husanović - Muri, has participated in several expeditions: Manaslu (Himalaya), Denali (Mount McKinley), Mont Blanc, Gran Paradiso, Matterhorn, etc.

== Demographics ==
Population of Banovići municipality
Year of census	1971	1981	1991	2013
Bosniaks	14,409 (70.86%)	16,440 (68.94%)	19,162 (72.06%)	21,374 (93.85%)
Serbs	4,441 (21.84%)	4,046 (16.96%)	4,514 (16.97%)	237 (1.04%)
Croats	919 (4.51%)	728 (3.05%)	550 (2.06%)	284 (1.24%)
Yugoslavs	363 (1.78%)	2,255 (9.45%)	1,928 (7.25%)	0.00 (0.005%)
others and unknown	202 (0.99%)	377 (1.58%)	436 (1.63%)	778 (3.41%)
total	20,334	23,846	26,590	22,773

== Twin towns – sister cities ==
Banovići is twinned with:

- Bečej, Serbia
- Labin, Croatia

== Gallery ==
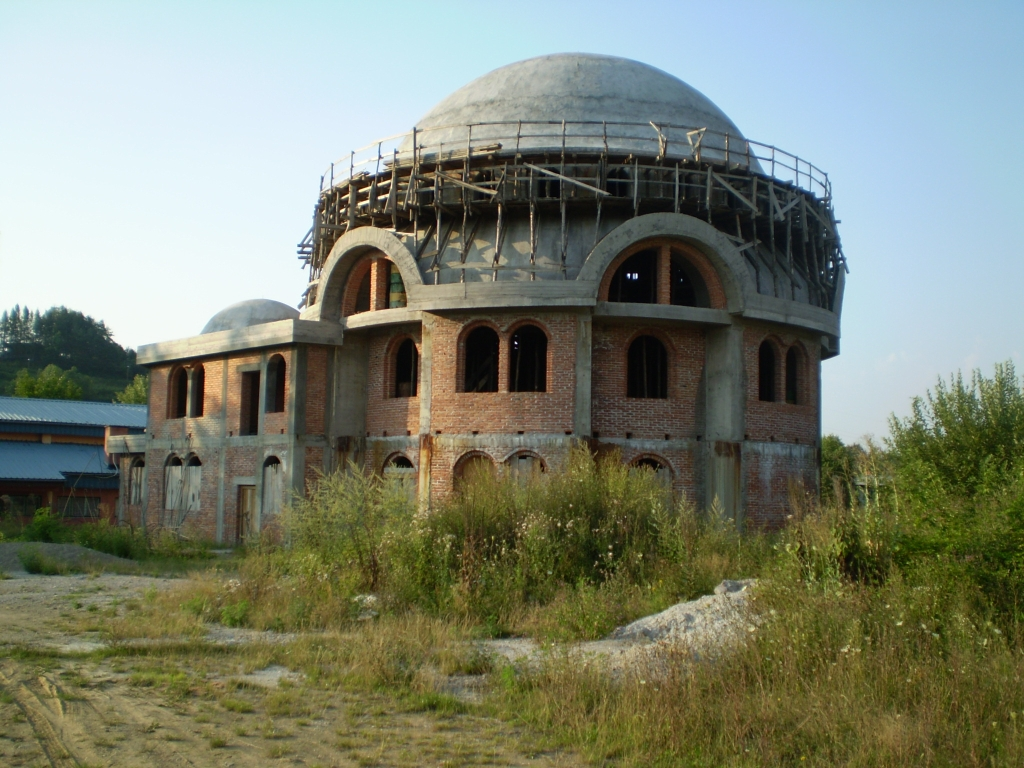
The construction of the Downtown Mosque

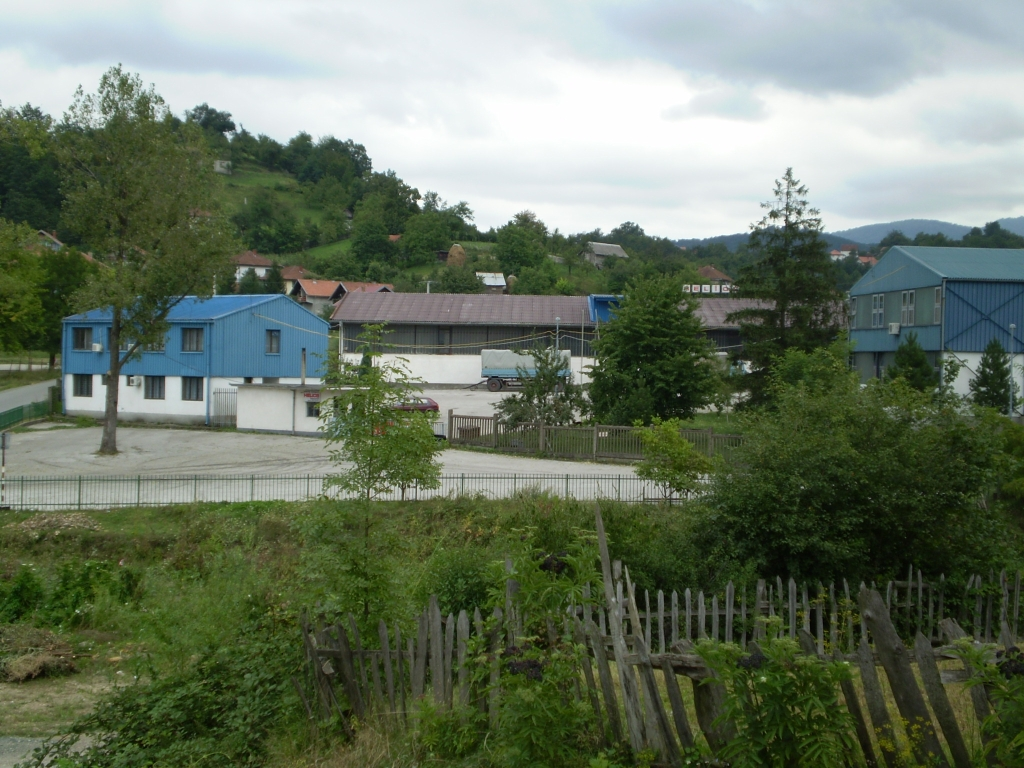
The "Helios" stove factory

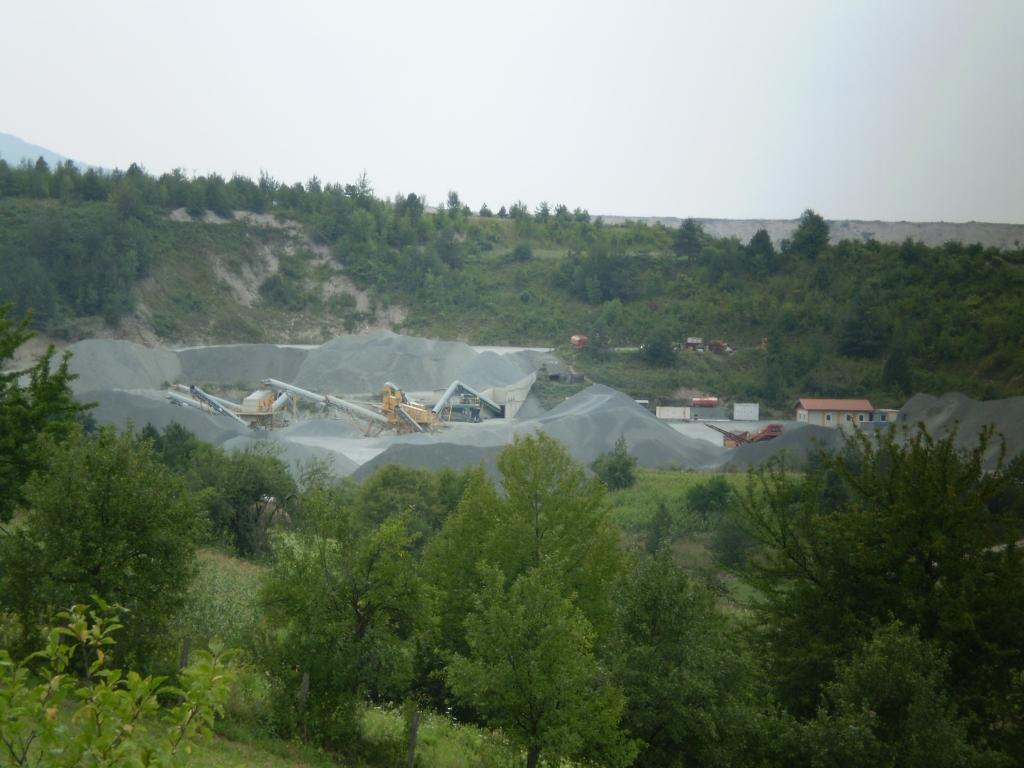
The diabase exploitation site

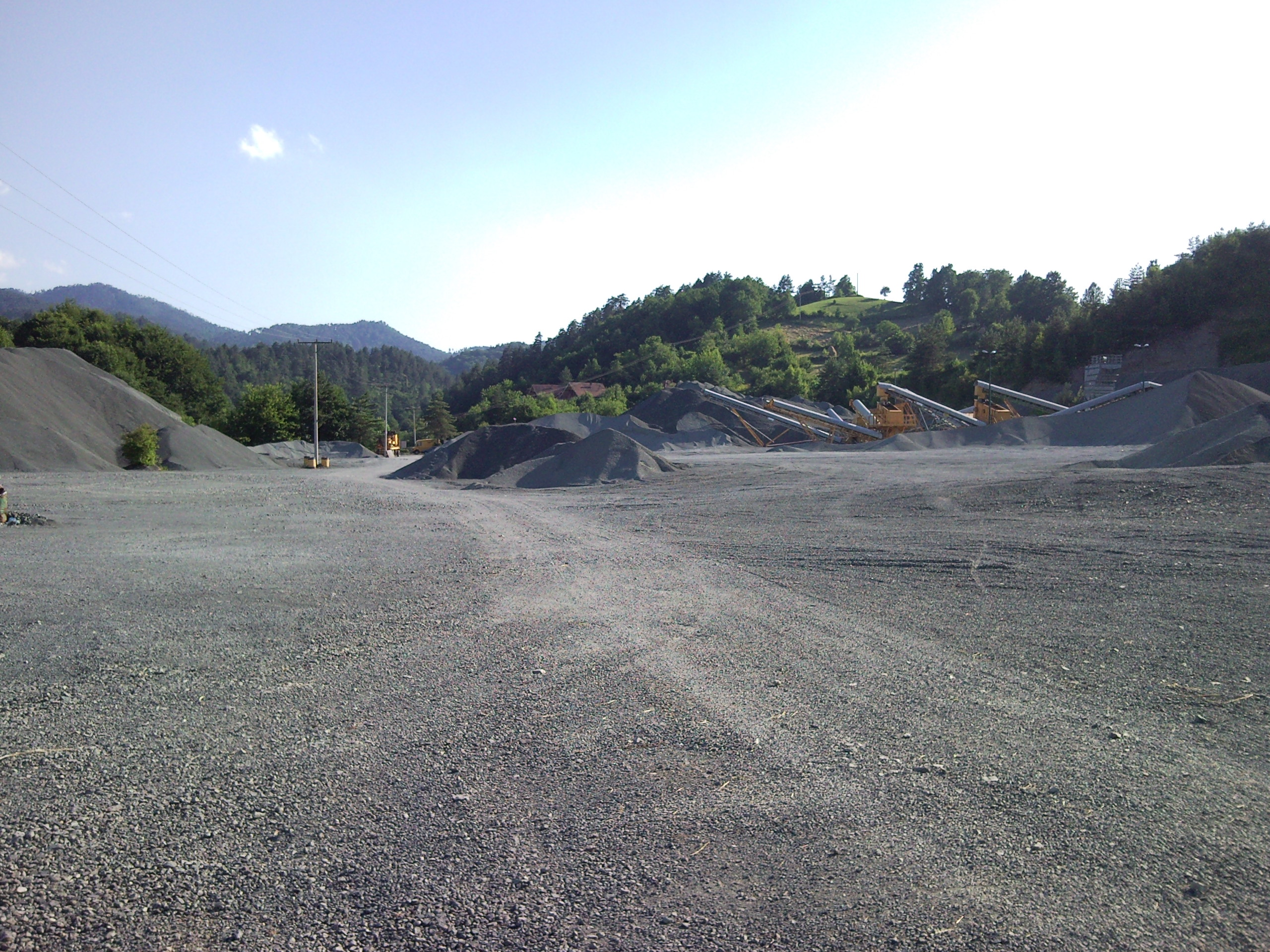
The diabase exploitation site

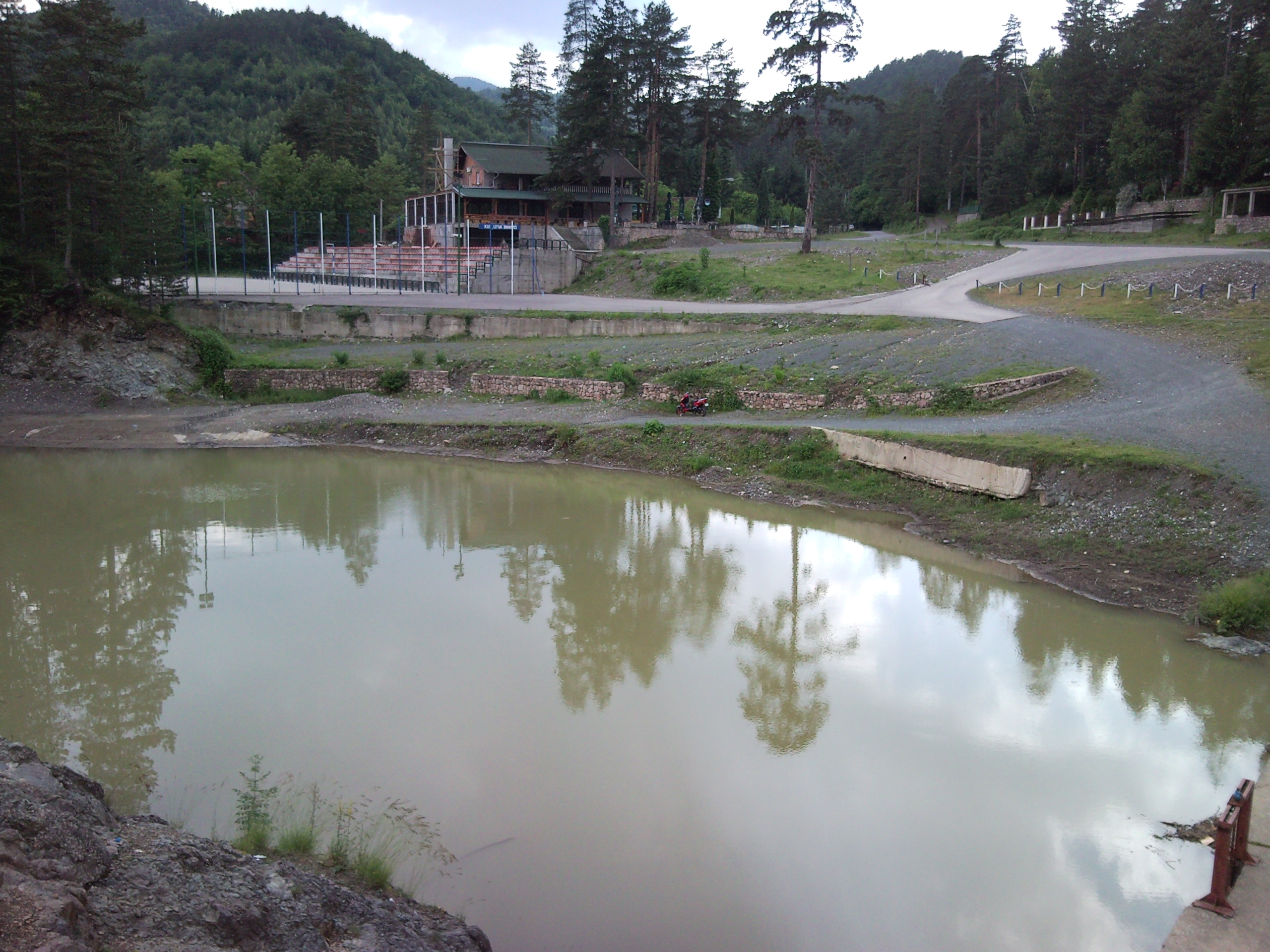
The "Mačkovac" picnic area

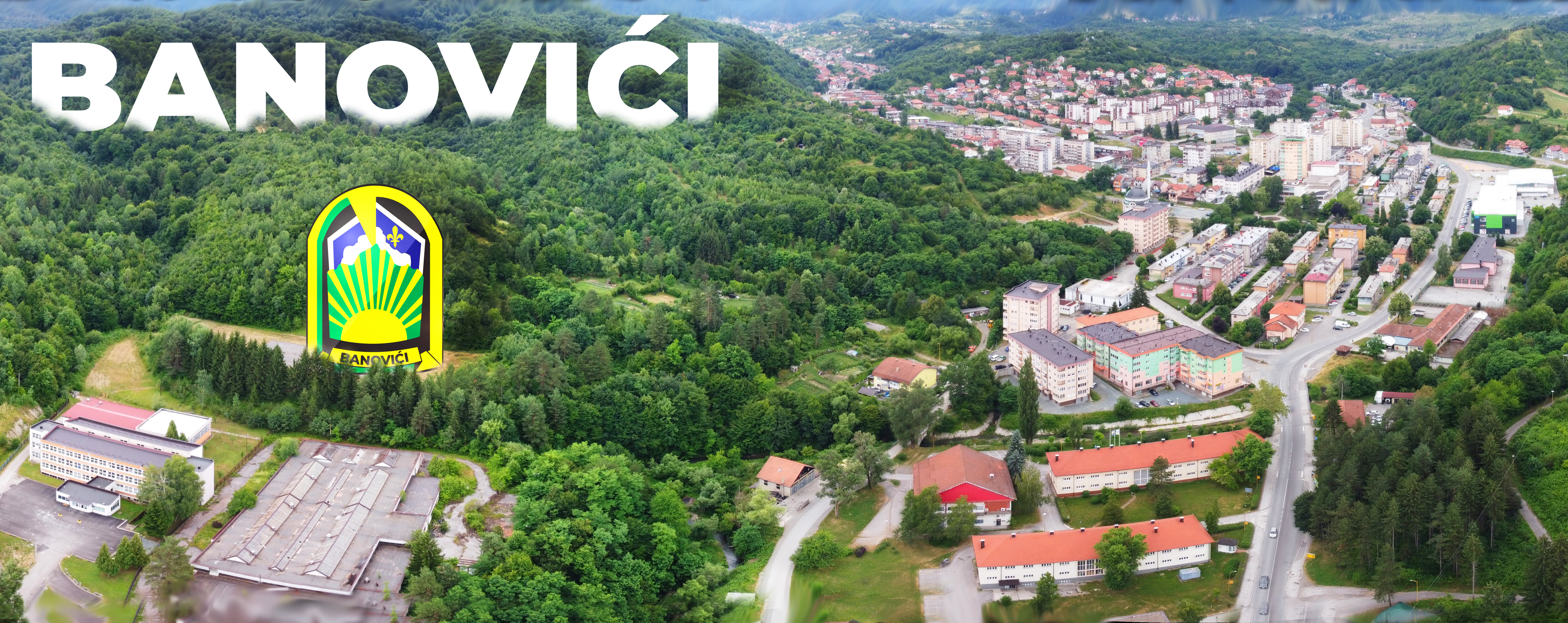
Banovići from above

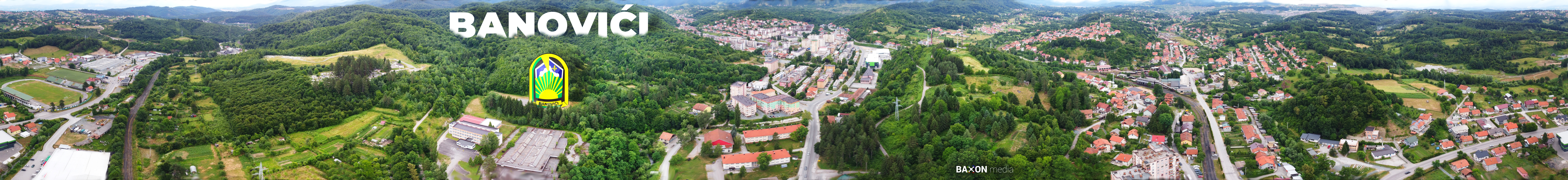
Banovici from the above — 360° by BAXON media
