= Višća Donja =

- Village
- Location within Bosnia and Herzegovina
- Coordinates: 44.4062°N 18.6148°E
- Country: Bosnia and Herzegovina
- Entity: Federation of Bosnia and Herzegovina
- Canton: Tuzla
- Municipality: Živinice

Area
  - Total: 2.28 sq mi (5.90 km^{2})

Population (2013)
  - Total: 1,178
  - Density: 517/sq mi (200/km^{2})
- Time zone: UTC+1 (CET)
  - Summer (DST): UTC+2 (CEST)

Višća Donja is a village in the municipality of Živinice, Bosnia and Herzegovina.

== Demographics ==
According to the 2013 census, its population was 1,178.

Ethnicity in 2013
Ethnicity	Number	Percentage
Bosniaks	1,014	86.1%
Croats	120	10.2%
Serbs	4	0.3%
other/undeclared	40	3.4%
Total	1,178	100%
