= Živinice Gornje =

- Village
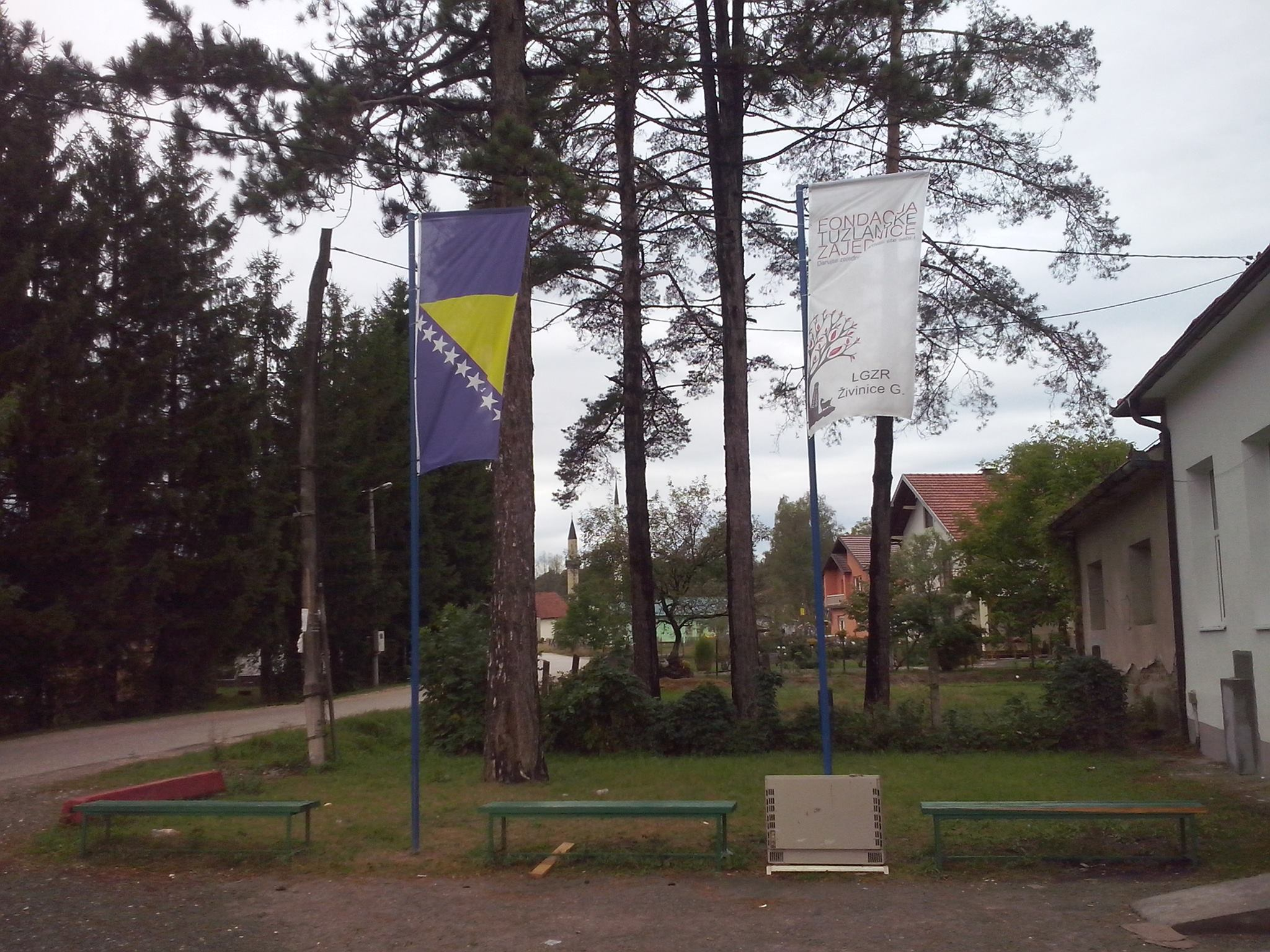

- Location within Bosnia and Herzegovina
- Coordinates: 44.4306°N 18.5844°E
- Country: Bosnia and Herzegovina
- Entity: Federation of Bosnia and Herzegovina
- Canton: Tuzla
- Municipality: Živinice

Area
  - Total: 5.22 sq mi (13.53 km^{2})

Population (2013)
  - Total: 2,672
  - Density: 511.5/sq mi (197.5/km^{2})
- Time zone: UTC+1 (CET)
  - Summer (DST): UTC+2 (CEST)

Živinice Gornje is a village in the municipality of Živinice, Bosnia and Herzegovina.

== Demographics ==
According to the 2013 census, its population was 2,672.

Ethnicity in 2013
Ethnicity	Number	Percentage
Bosniaks	2,312	86.5%
Croats	306	11.5%
Serbs	1	0.0%
other/undeclared	53	2.0%
Total	2,672	100%
