= Tupković Donji =

- Village
- Location within Bosnia and Herzegovina
- Coordinates: 44.4134°N 18.7803°E
- Country: Bosnia and Herzegovina
- Entity: Federation of Bosnia and Herzegovina
- Canton: Tuzla
- Municipality: Živinice

Area
  - Total: 2.72 sq mi (7.05 km^{2})

Population (2013)
  - Total: 561
  - Density: 206/sq mi (79.6/km^{2})
- Time zone: UTC+1 (CET)
  - Summer (DST): UTC+2 (CEST)

Tupković Donji is a village in the municipality of Živinice, Bosnia and Herzegovina.

== Demographics ==
According to the 2013 census, its population was 561.

Ethnicity in 2013
Ethnicity	Number	Percentage
Bosniaks	555	98.8%
Serbs	5	0.9%
other/undeclared	1	0.2%
Total	561	100%
