= Kuljan =

- Village
- Location within Bosnia and Herzegovina
- Coordinates: 44.3609°N 18.7220°E
- Country: Bosnia and Herzegovina
- Entity: Federation of Bosnia and Herzegovina
- Canton: Tuzla
- Municipality: Živinice

Area
  - Total: 3.94 sq mi (10.21 km^{2})

Population (2013)
  - Total: 474
  - Density: 120/sq mi (46.4/km^{2})
- Time zone: UTC+1 (CET)
  - Summer (DST): UTC+2 (CEST)

Kuljan is a village in the municipality of Živinice, Bosnia and Herzegovina.

== Demographics ==
According to the 2013 census, its population was 474.

Ethnicity in 2013
Ethnicity	Number	Percentage
Bosniaks	473	99.8%
Serbs	1	0.2%
Total	474	100%
