= Lukavica Gornja =

- Village
- Location within Bosnia and Herzegovina
- Coordinates: 44.4045°N 18.7119°E
- Country: Bosnia and Herzegovina
- Entity: Federation of Bosnia and Herzegovina
- Canton: Tuzla
- Municipality: Živinice

Area
  - Total: 3.32 sq mi (8.60 km^{2})

Population (2013)
  - Total: 1,354
  - Density: 408/sq mi (157/km^{2})
- Time zone: UTC+1 (CET)
  - Summer (DST): UTC+2 (CEST)

Lukavica Gornja is a village in the municipality of Živinice, Bosnia and Herzegovina.

== Demographics ==
According to the 2013 census, its population was 1,354.

Ethnicity in 2013
Ethnicity	Number	Percentage
Bosniaks	1,348	99.6%
other/undeclared	6	0.4%
Total	1,354	100%
