= Kršići =

- Village
- Location within Bosnia and Herzegovina
- Coordinates: 44.3725°N 18.6874°E
- Country: Bosnia and Herzegovina
- Entity: Federation of Bosnia and Herzegovina
- Canton: Tuzla
- Municipality: Živinice

Area
  - Total: 2.03 sq mi (5.27 km^{2})

Population (2013)
  - Total: 366
  - Density: 180/sq mi (69.4/km^{2})
- Time zone: UTC+1 (CET)
  - Summer (DST): UTC+2 (CEST)

Kršići is a village in the municipality of Živinice, Bosnia and Herzegovina.

== Demographics ==
According to the 2013 census, its population was 366.

Ethnicity in 2013
Ethnicity	Number	Percentage
Bosniaks	348	95.1%
other/undeclared	18	4.9%
Total	366	100%
