= Spreča, Živinice =

Spreča
- Village
- Location within Bosnia and Herzegovina
- Coordinates: 44.4754°N 18.6213°E
- Country: Bosnia and Herzegovina
- Entity: Federation of Bosnia and Herzegovina
- Canton: Tuzla
- Municipality: Živinice

Area
  - Total: 3.19 sq mi (8.25 km^{2})

Population (2013)
  - Total: 631
  - Density: 198/sq mi (76.5/km^{2})
- Time zone: UTC+1 (CET)
  - Summer (DST): UTC+2 (CEST)

Spreča is a village in the municipality of Živinice, Bosnia and Herzegovina.

== Demographics ==
According to the 2013 census, its population was 631.

Ethnicity in 2013
Ethnicity	Number	Percentage
Bosniaks	400	63.4%
Croats	198	31.4%
Serbs	2	0.3%
other/undeclared	31	4.9%
Total	631	100%
