= Odorovići =

- Village
- Location within Bosnia and Herzegovina
- Coordinates: 44.3944°N 18.5644°E
- Country: Bosnia and Herzegovina
- Entity: Federation of Bosnia and Herzegovina
- Canton: Tuzla
- Municipality: Živinice

Area
  - Total: 5.83 sq mi (15.09 km^{2})

Population (2013)
  - Total: 1,096
  - Density: 188.1/sq mi (72.63/km^{2})
- Time zone: UTC+1 (CET)
  - Summer (DST): UTC+2 (CEST)

Odorovići is a village in the municipality of Živinice, Bosnia and Herzegovina.

== Demographics ==
According to the 2013 census, its population was 1,096.

Ethnicity in 2013
Ethnicity	Number	Percentage
Bosniaks	1,047	95.5%
Croats	17	1.6%
Serbs	2	0.2%
other/undeclared	30	2.7%
Total	1,096	100%
