= Lukavica Donja =

- Village
- Location within Bosnia and Herzegovina
- Coordinates: 44.4053°N 18.6782°E
- Country: Bosnia and Herzegovina
- Entity: Federation of Bosnia and Herzegovina
- Canton: Tuzla
- Municipality: Živinice

Area
  - Total: 3.57 sq mi (9.24 km^{2})

Population (2013)
  - Total: 1,327
  - Density: 372/sq mi (144/km^{2})
- Time zone: UTC+1 (CET)
  - Summer (DST): UTC+2 (CEST)

Lukavica Donja is a village in the municipality of Živinice, Bosnia and Herzegovina. It is located 8 km (5.0 mi) east from Živinice town.

== Demographics ==
According to the 2013 census, its population was 1,327.

Ethnicity in 2013
Ethnicity	Number	Percentage
Bosniaks	1,311	98.8%
Croats	1	0.1%
Serbs	0	0.0%
other/undeclared	15	1.1%
Total	1,327	100%
