= Repnik =

Repnik Репник
- Village
- Location within Bosnia and Herzegovina
- Coordinates: 44°23′10″N 18°30′26″E
- Country: Bosnia and Herzegovina
- Entity: Federation of Bosnia and Herzegovina
- Canton: Tuzla
- Municipality: Banovići

Area
  - Total: 21.46 sq mi (55.59 km^{2})

Population (2013)
  - Total: 2,309
  - Density: 107.6/sq mi (41.54/km^{2})
- Time zone: UTC+1 (CET)
  - Summer (DST): UTC+2 (CEST)

Repnik (Serbian: Репник) is a village in the municipality of Banovići, Bosnia and Herzegovina.

== Demographics ==
According to the 2013 census, its population was 2,309.

Ethnicity in 2013
Ethnicity	Number	Percentage
Bosniaks	2,286	99.1%
Serbs	2	0.1%
other/undeclared	22	0.8%
Total	2,309	100%
