= Oskova =

Oskova Оскова
- Village
- Location within Bosnia and Herzegovina
- Coordinates: 44°25′N 18°34′E
- Country: Bosnia and Herzegovina
- Entity: Federation of Bosnia and Herzegovina
- Canton: Tuzla
- Municipality: Banovići

Area
  - Total: 0.87 sq mi (2.26 km^{2})

Population (2013)
  - Total: 637
  - Density: 730/sq mi (282/km^{2})
- Time zone: UTC+1 (CET)
  - Summer (DST): UTC+2 (CEST)

Oskova (Serbian: Оскова) is a village in the municipality of Banovići, Bosnia and Herzegovina.

== Demographics ==
According to the 2013 census, its population was 637.

Ethnicity in 2013
Ethnicity	Number	Percentage
Bosniaks	555	87.1%
Croats	25	3.9%
Serbs	18	2.8%
other/undeclared	39	6.1%
Total	637	100%
