= Treštenica Donja =

Treštenica Donja Трештеница Доња
- Village
- Location within Bosnia and Herzegovina
- Coordinates: 44°26′N 18°27′E
- Country: Bosnia and Herzegovina
- Entity: Federation of Bosnia and Herzegovina
- Canton: Tuzla
- Municipality: Banovići

Area
  - Total: 0.81 sq mi (2.10 km^{2})

Population (2013)
  - Total: 790
  - Density: 970/sq mi (380/km^{2})
- Time zone: UTC+1 (CET)
  - Summer (DST): UTC+2 (CEST)

Treštenica Donja (Serbian: Трештеница Доња) is a village in the municipality of Banovići, Bosnia and Herzegovina.

== Demographics ==
According to the 2013 census, its population was 790.

Ethnicity in 2013
Ethnicity	Number	Percentage
Bosniaks	788	99.7%
Croats	1	0.1%
other/undeclared	1	0.1%
Total	790	100%
