= Seona, Banovići =

Seona Сеона
- Village
- Location within Bosnia and Herzegovina
- Coordinates: 44°26′11″N 18°22′31″E
- Country: Bosnia and Herzegovina
- Entity: Federation of Bosnia and Herzegovina
- Canton: Tuzla
- Municipality: Banovići

Area
  - Total: 4.46 sq mi (11.55 km^{2})

Population (2013)
  - Total: 795
  - Density: 178/sq mi (68.8/km^{2})
- Time zone: UTC+1 (CET)
  - Summer (DST): UTC+2 (CEST)

Seona (Serbian: Сеона) is a village in the municipality of Banovići, Bosnia and Herzegovina.

== Demographics ==
According to the 2013 census, its population was 795.

Ethnicity in 2013
Ethnicity	Number	Percentage
Bosniaks	791	99.5%
other/undeclared	4	0.5%
Total	795	100%
