= Pribitkovići =

Pribitkovići Прибитковићи
- Village
- Location within Bosnia and Herzegovina
- Coordinates: 44°25′N 18°24′E
- Country: Bosnia and Herzegovina
- Entity: Federation of Bosnia and Herzegovina
- Canton: Tuzla
- Municipality: Banovići

Area
  - Total: 2.47 sq mi (6.40 km^{2})

Population (2013)
  - Total: 502
  - Density: 203/sq mi (78.4/km^{2})
- Time zone: UTC+1 (CET)
  - Summer (DST): UTC+2 (CEST)

Pribitkovići (Serbian: Прибитковићи) is a village in the municipality of Banovići, Bosnia and Herzegovina.

== Demographics ==
According to the 2013 census, its population was 502.

Ethnicity in 2013
Ethnicity	Number	Percentage
Bosniaks	490	97.6%
other/undeclared	12	2.4%
Total	502	100%
