= Lozna (Banovići) =

Lozna Лозна
- Village
- Location within Bosnia and Herzegovina
- Coordinates: 44°27′N 18°24′E
- Country: Bosnia and Herzegovina
- Entity: Federation of Bosnia and Herzegovina
- Canton: Tuzla
- Municipality: Banovići

Area
  - Total: 6.90 sq mi (17.87 km^{2})

Population (2013)
  - Total: 162
  - Density: 23.5/sq mi (9.07/km^{2})
- Time zone: UTC+1 (CET)
  - Summer (DST): UTC+2 (CEST)

Lozna (Serbian: Лозна) is a village in the municipality of Banovići, Bosnia and Herzegovina.

== Demographics ==
According to the 2013 census, its population was 162.

Ethnicity in 2013
| Ethnicity | Number | Percentage |
|---|---|---|
| Bosniaks | 148 | 91.4% |
| other/undeclared | 14 | 8.6% |
| Total | 162 | 100% |
