= Kreka coal mine =

Coal mine in Bosnia and Herzegovina

Kreka Coal Mine
- Location within Bosnia and Herzegovina
- Location: Kreka, Tuzla, Tuzla Canton, Federation of Bosnia and Herzegovina, 75000, Bosnia and Herzegovina; 44°34′47.14″N 18°32′23.97″E
- Products: Lignite
- Production: 1.3 million tonnes of coal (2024)
- Company: Elektroprivreda Bosne i Hercegovine

The Kreka Coal Mine is a coal mine located in the Tuzla Canton, Bosnia and Herzegovina. It is owned and operated by Elektroprivreda Bosne i Hercegovine.

The mine has coal reserves amounting to 1.12 billion tonnes of lignite, one of the largest coal reserves in Europe and the world. The mine has an annual production generation of 1.3 million tonnes of coal (as of 2024).

It is one of the last remaining operators of steam locomotives in Bosnia as of 2024, with five DRB Class 52 locomotives still in operating service transporting lignite from the mine to the Tuzla Thermal Power Plant, the largest coal-fired power plant in the country.

== See also ==
- Dobrnja-Jug mine disaster
