= Gornji Bučik =

Gornji Bučik Горњи Бучик
- Village
- Location within Bosnia and Herzegovina
- Coordinates: 44°26′09″N 18°31′22″E
- Country: Bosnia and Herzegovina
- Entity: Federation of Bosnia and Herzegovina
- Canton: Tuzla
- Municipality: Banovići

Area
  - Total: 1.66 sq mi (4.31 km^{2})

Population (2013)
  - Total: 323
  - Density: 194/sq mi (74.9/km^{2})
- Time zone: UTC+1 (CET)
  - Summer (DST): UTC+2 (CEST)

Gornji Bučik (Serbian: Горњи Бучик) is a village in the municipality of Banovići, Bosnia and Herzegovina.

== Demographics ==
According to the 2013 census, its population was 323.

Ethnicity in 2013
Ethnicity	Number	Percentage
Bosniaks	322	99.7%
other/undeclared	1	0.3%
Total	323	100%
