= Treštenica Gornja =

Treštenica Gornja Трештеница Горња
- Village
- Location within Bosnia and Herzegovina
- Coordinates: 44°27′01″N 18°26′40″E
- Country: Bosnia and Herzegovina
- Entity: Federation of Bosnia and Herzegovina
- Canton: Tuzla
- Municipality: Banovići

Area
  - Total: 1.66 sq mi (4.29 km^{2})

Population (2013)
  - Total: 149
  - Density: 90.0/sq mi (34.7/km^{2})
- Time zone: UTC+1 (CET)
  - Summer (DST): UTC+2 (CEST)

Treštenica Gornja (Serbian: Трештеница Горња) is a village in the municipality of Banovići, Bosnia and Herzegovina.

== Demographics ==
According to the 2013 census, its population was 149.

Ethnicity in 2013
Ethnicity	Number	Percentage
Bosniaks	140	94.0%
Serbs	9	0.6%
Total	149	100%
