= Mrgan =

Mrgan Мрган
- Village
- Location within Bosnia and Herzegovina
- Coordinates: 44°22′N 18°25′E
- Country: Bosnia and Herzegovina
- Entity: Federation of Bosnia and Herzegovina
- Canton: Tuzla
- Municipality: Banovići

Area
  - Total: 1.28 sq mi (3.32 km^{2})

Population (2013)
  - Total: 356
  - Density: 278/sq mi (107/km^{2})
- Time zone: UTC+1 (CET)
  - Summer (DST): UTC+2 (CEST)

Mrgan (Serbian: Мрган) is a village in the municipality of Banovići, Bosnia and Herzegovina.

== Demographics ==
According to the 2013 census, its population was 356.

Ethnicity in 2013
| Ethnicity | Number | Percentage |
|---|---|---|
| Bosniaks | 350 | 98.3% |
| other/undeclared | 6 | 1.7% |
| Total | 356 | 100% |
