= Tulovići =

Tulovići Туловићи
- Village
- Location within Bosnia and Herzegovina
- Coordinates: 44°25′57″N 18°29′01″E
- Country: Bosnia and Herzegovina
- Entity: Federation of Bosnia and Herzegovina
- Canton: Tuzla
- Municipality: Banovići

Area
  - Total: 3.56 sq mi (9.23 km^{2})

Population (2013)
  - Total: 867
  - Density: 243/sq mi (93.9/km^{2})
- Time zone: UTC+1 (CET)
  - Summer (DST): UTC+2 (CEST)

Tulovići (Serbian: Туловићи) is a village in the municipality of Banovići, Bosnia and Herzegovina.

== Demographics ==
According to the 2013 census, its population was 867.

Ethnicity in 2013
Ethnicity	Number	Percentage
Bosniaks	863	99.5%
other/undeclared	4	0.5%
Total	867	100%
