= Podgorje (Banovići) =

Podgorje Подгорје
- Village
- Location within Bosnia and Herzegovina
- Coordinates: 44°23′34″N 18°28′54″E
- Country: Bosnia and Herzegovina
- Entity: Federation of Bosnia and Herzegovina
- Canton: Tuzla
- Municipality: Banovići

Area
  - Total: 2.56 sq mi (6.64 km^{2})

Population (2013)
  - Total: 1,106
  - Density: 431/sq mi (167/km^{2})
- Time zone: UTC+1 (CET)
  - Summer (DST): UTC+2 (CEST)

Podgorje (Serbian: Подгорје) is a village in the municipality of Banovići, Bosnia and Herzegovina.

== Demographics ==
According to the 2013 census, its population was 1,106.

Ethnicity in 2013
Ethnicity	Number	Percentage
Bosniaks	907	82.0%
Croats	2	0.2%
Serbs	2	0.2%
Other/Undeclared	195	17.6%
Total	1,106	100%
