= Željova =

Željova Жељова
- Village
- Location within Bosnia and Herzegovina
- Coordinates: 44°22′34″N 18°27′08″E
- Country: Bosnia and Herzegovina
- Entity: Federation of Bosnia and Herzegovina
- Canton: Tuzla
- Municipality: Banovići

Area
  - Total: 5.94 sq mi (15.39 km^{2})

Population (2013)
  - Total: 19
  - Density: 3.2/sq mi (1.2/km^{2})
- Time zone: UTC+1 (CET)
  - Summer (DST): UTC+2 (CEST)

Željova (Serbian: Жељова) is a village in the municipality of Banovići, Bosnia and Herzegovina.

== History ==
Up until the Bosnian War almost only Serbs lived in Željova, who were attacked by the Ustašas in World War II, and the village was literally overturned in the Bosnian War.

== Demographics ==
According to the 2013 census, its population was 19.

Ethnicity in 2013
Ethnicity	Number	Percentage
Bosniaks	11	57.9%
Serbs	7	36.8%
other/undeclared	1	5.3%
Total	19	100%
