= Borovac (Banovići) =

Borovac Боровац
- Village
- Location within Bosnia and Herzegovina
- Coordinates: 44°27′24″N 18°20′27″E
- Country: Bosnia and Herzegovina
- Entity: Federation of Bosnia and Herzegovina
- Canton: Tuzla
- Municipality: Banovići

Area
  - Total: 1.53 sq mi (3.97 km^{2})

Population (2013)
  - Total: 310
  - Density: 200/sq mi (78/km^{2})
- Time zone: UTC+1 (CET)
  - Summer (DST): UTC+2 (CEST)

Borovac (Serbian: Боровац) is a village in the municipality of Banovići, Bosnia and Herzegovina.

== Demographics ==
According to the 2013 census, its population was 310.

Ethnicity in 2013
Ethnicity	Number	Percentage
Bosniaks	305	98.4%
other/undeclared	5	1.6%
Total	310	100%
