= Banovići Selo =

Banovići Selo Бановићи Село
- Village
- Location within Bosnia and Herzegovina
- Coordinates: 44°24′15″N 18°26′51″E
- Country: Bosnia and Herzegovina
- Entity: Federation of Bosnia and Herzegovina
- Canton: Tuzla
- Municipality: Banovići

Area
  - Total: 0.86 sq mi (2.24 km^{2})

Population (2013)
  - Total: 6,432
  - Density: 7,440/sq mi (2,870/km^{2})
- Time zone: UTC+1 (CET)
  - Summer (DST): UTC+2 (CEST)

Banovići Selo (Serbian: Бановићи Село) is a village in the municipality of Banovići, Bosnia and Herzegovina.

== Demographics ==
According to the 2013 census, its population was 6,432.

Ethnicity in 2013
Ethnicity	Number	Percentage
Bosniaks	5,572	86.6%
Croats	255	4.0%
Serbs	197	3.1%
other/undeclared	408	6.3%
Total	6,432	100%
