= Hajrudin Ćatić =

Bosnian-German footballer

Personal information
- Date of birth: 23 March 1975 (age 51)
- Place of birth: Cologne, West Germany
- Height: 1.80 m (5 ft 11 in)
- Position: Midfielder

Team information
- Current team: SV Rheidt

Youth career
- –1992: 1. FC Köln
- 1992–1995: Fortuna Köln

Senior career*
Years	Team	Apps	(Gls)
1995–2000	Fortuna Köln	56	(4)
2000–2002	Waldhof Mannheim	46	(5)
2002–2004	Rot-Weiß Oberhausen	44	(3)
2004–2005	Union Berlin	26	(3)
2005–2009	SV Wehen Wiesbaden	92	(12)
2008–2010	SV Wehen Wiesbaden II	23	(5)
2010–2015	Hilal Bergheim	82	(33)
2015	Köln-Niehl 09/52	2	(0)
2016–2018	Türkspor Bergheim	25	(10)
2018–2019	CfR Buschbell	26	(9)
2019–	SV Rheidt	21	(11)

Managerial career
- 2016–2018: Türkspor Bergheim
- 2019–: SV Rheidt
- * Club domestic league appearances and goals

Hajrudin Ćatić (born 23 March 1975) is a Bosnian-German former professional footballer who plays as a midfielder for SV 1926 Rheidt.
