= Tuzla Thermal Power Plant =

Coal-fired power plant in Bosnia and Herzegovina

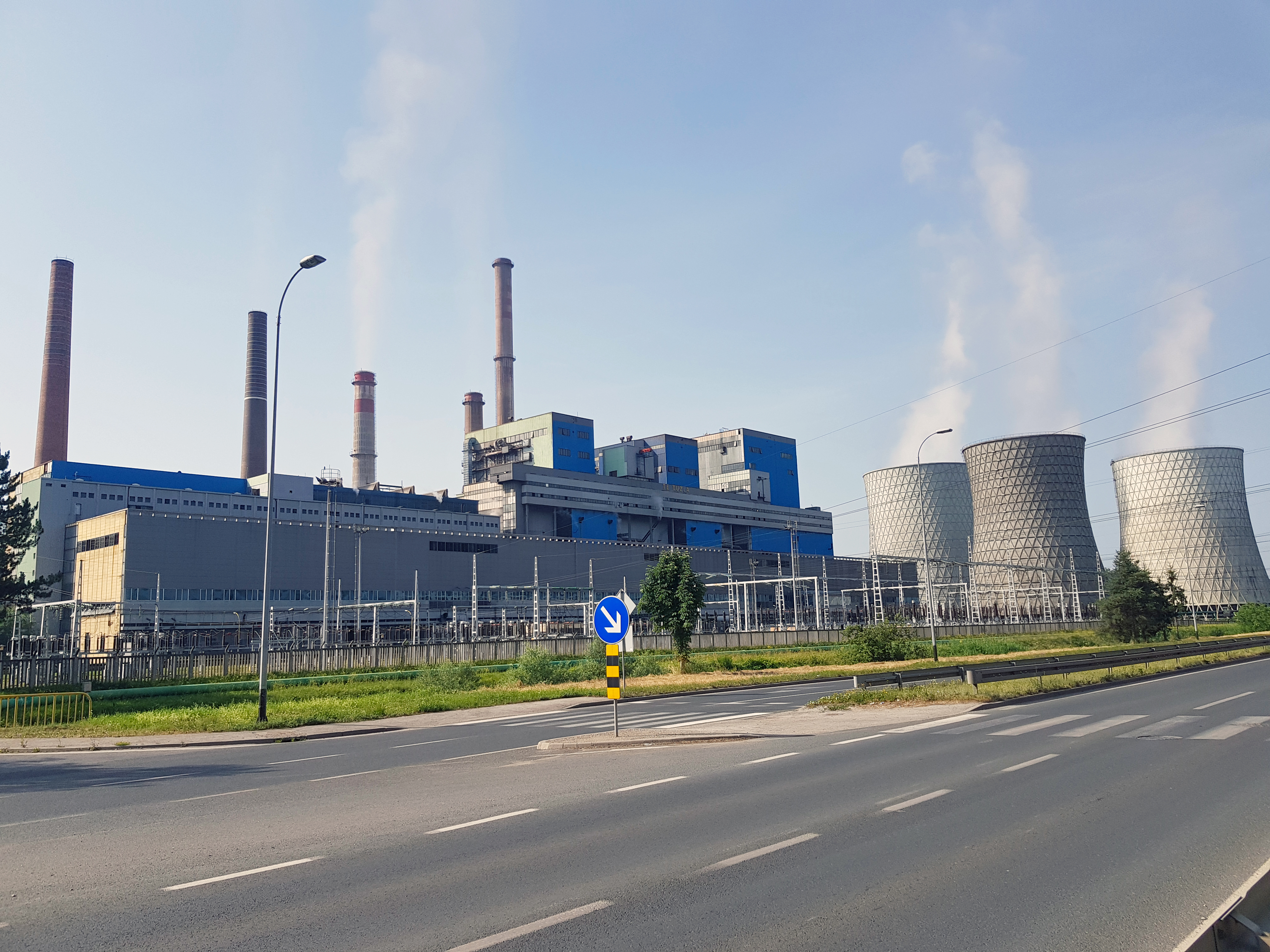
- View on Tuzla Thermal Power Plant, June 2022
- Country: Bosnia and Herzegovina
- Location: Tuzla, Bosnia and Herzegovina
- Coordinates: 44°31′12″N 18°36′22″E
- Status: Operational
- Commission date: 1963; 63 years ago
- Owner: EBiH
- Operator: Elektroprivreda Bosne i Hercegovine

Thermal power station
- Primary fuel: Coal
- Cogeneration?: Yes

Power generation
- Units operational: 1 × 100 MW; 2 × 200 MW; 1 × 215 MW
- Make and model: Škoda; LMZ; Electrosila; Rafako; Zamech; Dolmel
- Nameplate capacity: 715 MW
- Annual net output: 2,522 GWh (2025)

External links
- Website: www.epbih.ba
- Commons: Related media on Commons

Tuzla Thermal Power Plant is a coal-fired thermal power plant in Tuzla, Bosnia and Herzegovina. It is the largest power plant in Bosnia and Herzegovina, generating 2,522 GWh annually (as of 2025). It is operated by Elektroprivreda Bosne i Hercegovine (EBiH).

The power plant uses coal as fuel from Kreka coal mine, Banovići coal mine, and Đurđevik coal mine. As the water cooling source, it uses the nearby Modrac Lake.

== History ==
The construction of the first two units started in 1959. The first 32 MW unit was commissioned in 1963 and the last 215 MW unit was commissioned in 1978.

In 2011, there was a plan to build a new 450 MW unit by the Gezhouba Group.

== Description ==
The power station has an installed electric capacity of 715 MW (without two 32 MW units) and it produces around 3.1 TWh of electricity per year. In addition, it supplies heat for Tuzla and Lukavac. The plant burns 3,300,000 tons of coal annually.

Units 1–6 are supplied from the Kreka and Banovići mines. Unit 4 has a 100-metre (330 ft) flue gas stack, Unit 6 a 165-metre (541 ft) flue gas stack.

== Background ==
For several years a new 450 MW unit has been planned at the Tuzla coal power plant in Bosnia and Herzegovina, owned and operated by the state-owned Elektroprivreda Bosne i Hercegovine.

Although it is usually cited as a replacement for existing units, Elektroprivreda BiH planned to close only the existing units 3 and 4 (total 310 MW) in 2018 and 2021 respectively, while units 5 and 6 (total 415 MW) would continue to operate until after 2030. Thus Tuzla 7 would result in additional coal capacity compared to the current situation.

=== Financing ===
An Engineering, procurement, and construction (EPC) contract worth EUR 785 million was signed with China Gezhouba Group Co. on 30 August 2014, but it was later admitted that the plant would not be economically feasible. In May 2016 an annex to the contract was signed, which brought the cost down to EUR 722 million.

In December 2014 a Memorandum of Understanding on financing the facility was signed with the Exim Bank of China, and in November 2016 a framework agreement on financing was signed.

On 27 November 2017, The China Exim bank and Bosnian power utility Elektroprivreda BIH signed a 613 million euro loan agreement for the Tuzla 7 lignite power plant. In 2023, Unit 7 project was canceled following the withdrawal of funding and persistent environmental concerns.

== Opposition ==
=== Environmental impacts and policies ===
The environmental permit for Tuzla 7 is incomplete as it does not cover the foreseen ash landfill on the Šićki Brod site. According to Article 71 of the Federation of Bosnia and Herzegovina's Law on Environmental Protection, an environmental permit must include measures for managing waste produced by the facility in question. (Environment of Bosnia and Herzegovina)

In addition, using the Šićki Brod site as an ash landfill would contravene the Tuzla Canton and Lukavac and Tuzla municipality spatial plans, and is opposed by the Lukavac municipality council and the population living in the local communities surrounding the location. In April 2016 they presented a petition with 2100 signatures against the site to the Ministry of Environment and Tourism. The government has still no answer to all the protesters in 2019. The ash landfill, if it is ever built, would destroy a whole ecosystem. With the ash reaching deep down to natural water springs which many local people use to drink and use, the whole area would depend on non-potable tap water. The ash would also directly pollute more than 150,000 people just around Lukavac and Tuzla. Nearby places like Plane, Bistarac, Bukinje, Brgule and Lukavac already have a problem with pollution; with the ash landfill built, the area would suffer even more, which would be hazardous for all the people living there. Drinkable water would be polluted as would the land which many farmers use to grow food.

=== Scarce water resources ===
The Tuzla power plant takes cooling water from the Modrac Reservoir, the same source as much of the drinking water for Tuzla. This reservoir is fed mainly by the Turija River and the Spreča River; it already suffers from pollution caused by coal production and separation. If the Banovici coal power plant is built – another project just a few kilometers away from Tuzla—it will directly compete with the Modrac Lake for water in drier periods.

=== Health impacts ===
In November 2013, the Center for Ecology and Energy from Tuzla launched a report on the health impacts of existing and planned coal thermal power plants in the Tuzla area. Using the methods developed in the World Health Organization's Health Response to Air Pollutants in Europe project, the study found that in 2013 in Tuzla existing power plants will have caused the loss of 4900 years of life, 131,000 lost working days and more than 170 hospitalizations due to cardiac and respiratory diseases.

Although the Tuzla coal plant is the largest source of pollution in the area, it should be taken into account that this situation is aggravated further by the cumulative impacts with other pollution sources such as the Coke (fuel) plant and soda factory in Lukavac, thus increasing the health risks even further.

Average life expectancy has shortened to 51 years in places nearby.

=== Local protests ===
The air quality in Tuzla is notorious, ranked second by the World Health Organisation among Europe's most polluted towns in 2017.

The legal limits for pollutants PM2.5 (fine particles) and SO2 were breached in the long winter of 2017–2018. The Clean Air Movement—a group of citizens living in Tuzla concerned about the worsening health condition as a result of air pollution exposure—took to the streets to demand that authorities find long-term solutions to this ever-present problem. The authorities, however, have still no answer to all the protesters. The air pollution reached its peak in 2018 and the beginning of 2019, with the air quality index reaching more than 500, which is by all standards hazardous for all people.

== See also ==
- List of power stations in Bosnia and Herzegovina
