= Bego Ćatić =

Bosnian footballer

Personal information
- Full name: Bego Ćatić
- Date of birth: 14 May 1963 (age 63)
- Place of birth: Bijeljina, SFR Yugoslavia
- Position: Defender

Senior career*
Years	Team	Apps	(Gls)
1982–1986	Radnik Bijeljina	120	(4)
1986–1989	Šibenik	109	(6)
1989–1992	Zeytinburnuspor	103	(3)
1992–1997	Türkiyemspor Berlin	130	(8)
1997–2000	SD Croatia Berlin	7	(7)

Managerial career
- 1999–2001: SD Croatia Berlin
- 2006–2010: FC Anker Wismar
- * Club domestic league appearances and goals

Bego Ćatić (born 14 May 1963) is a former Bosnian footballer who played in the former Yugoslavia and Turkey.

== Playing career ==
Born in Bijeljina, Ćatić started playing football for local side FK Radnik Bijeljina in the Yugoslav Second League. He would also join fellow Second League side HNK Šibenik.

In 1989, Ćatić moved to Turkey, joining Süper Lig side Zeytinburnuspor for two seasons. He made 59 leagues appearances for the club.

He retired from professional football in 1991, and moved to Germany to play amateur football. He spent several seasons with Türkiyemspor Berlin, helping the club reach the regionalliga in 1994.

== Managerial career ==
In 2006, Ćatić became a manager of German Oberliga side FC Anker Wismar.
