= Omazići =

Omazići Омазићи
- Village
- Location within Bosnia and Herzegovina
- Coordinates: 44°25′34″N 18°32′36″E
- Country: Bosnia and Herzegovina
- Entity: Federation of Bosnia and Herzegovina
- Canton: Tuzla
- Municipality: Banovići

Area
  - Total: 1.69 sq mi (4.38 km^{2})

Population (2013)
  - Total: 1,380
  - Density: 816/sq mi (315/km^{2})
- Time zone: UTC+1 (CET)
  - Summer (DST): UTC+2 (CEST)

Omazići (Serbian: Омазићи) is a village in the municipality of Banovići, Bosnia and Herzegovina.

== Demographics ==
According to the 2013 census, its population was 1,380.

Ethnicity in 2013
Ethnicity	Number	Percentage
Bosniaks	1,283	93.0%
Croats	1	0.1%
Serbs	1	0.1%
other/undeclared	95	6.9%
Total	1,380	100%
