= Grivice =

Grivice Гривице
- Village
- Location within Bosnia and Herzegovina
- Coordinates: 44°26′N 18°30′E
- Country: Bosnia and Herzegovina
- Entity: Federation of Bosnia and Herzegovina
- Canton: Tuzla
- Municipality: Banovići

Area
  - Total: 4.06 sq mi (10.51 km^{2})

Population (2013)
  - Total: 2,395
  - Density: 590.2/sq mi (227.9/km^{2})
- Time zone: UTC+1 (CET)
  - Summer (DST): UTC+2 (CEST)

Grivice (Serbian: Гривице) is a village in the municipality of Banovići, Bosnia and Herzegovina.

== Demographics ==
According to the 2013 census, its population was 2,395.

Ethnicity in 2013
Ethnicity	Number	Percentage
Bosniaks	2,353	98.2%
Serbs	1	0.0%
other/undeclared	41	1.7%
Total	2,395	100%
