= Ćatići (Banovići) =

Ćatići Ћатићи
- Village
- Location within Bosnia and Herzegovina
- Coordinates: 44°21′36″N 18°25′12″E
- Country: Bosnia and Herzegovina
- Entity: Federation of Bosnia and Herzegovina
- Canton: Tuzla
- Municipality: Banovići

Area
  - Total: 2.34 sq mi (6.07 km^{2})

Population (2013)
  - Total: 272
  - Density: 116/sq mi (44.8/km^{2})
- Time zone: UTC+1 (CET)
  - Summer (DST): UTC+2 (CEST)

Ćatići (Serbian: Ћатићи) is a village in the municipality of Banovići, Bosnia and Herzegovina.

== Demographics ==
According to the 2013 census, its population was 272, all Bosniaks.
