= Đurđevik =

- Village
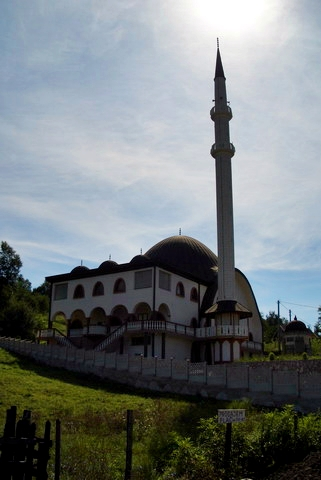

- Location within Bosnia and Herzegovina
- Coordinates: 44.4091°N 18.6310°E
- Country: Bosnia and Herzegovina
- Entity: Federation of Bosnia and Herzegovina
- Canton: Tuzla
- Municipality: Živinice

Area
  - Total: 4.34 sq mi (11.24 km^{2})

Population (2013)
  - Total: 3,184
  - Density: 733.7/sq mi (283.3/km^{2})
- Time zone: UTC+1 (CET)
  - Summer (DST): UTC+2 (CEST)

Đurđevik is a village in the municipality of Živinice, Bosnia and Herzegovina.

== Demographics ==
According to the 2013 census, its population was 3,184.

Ethnicity in 2013
Ethnicity	Number	Percentage
Bosniaks	3,065	96.3%
Croats	35	1.1%
Serbs	7	0.2%
other/undeclared	77	2.4%
Total	3,184	100%
