= Živinice =

- Town
- Grad Živinice; Town of Živinice
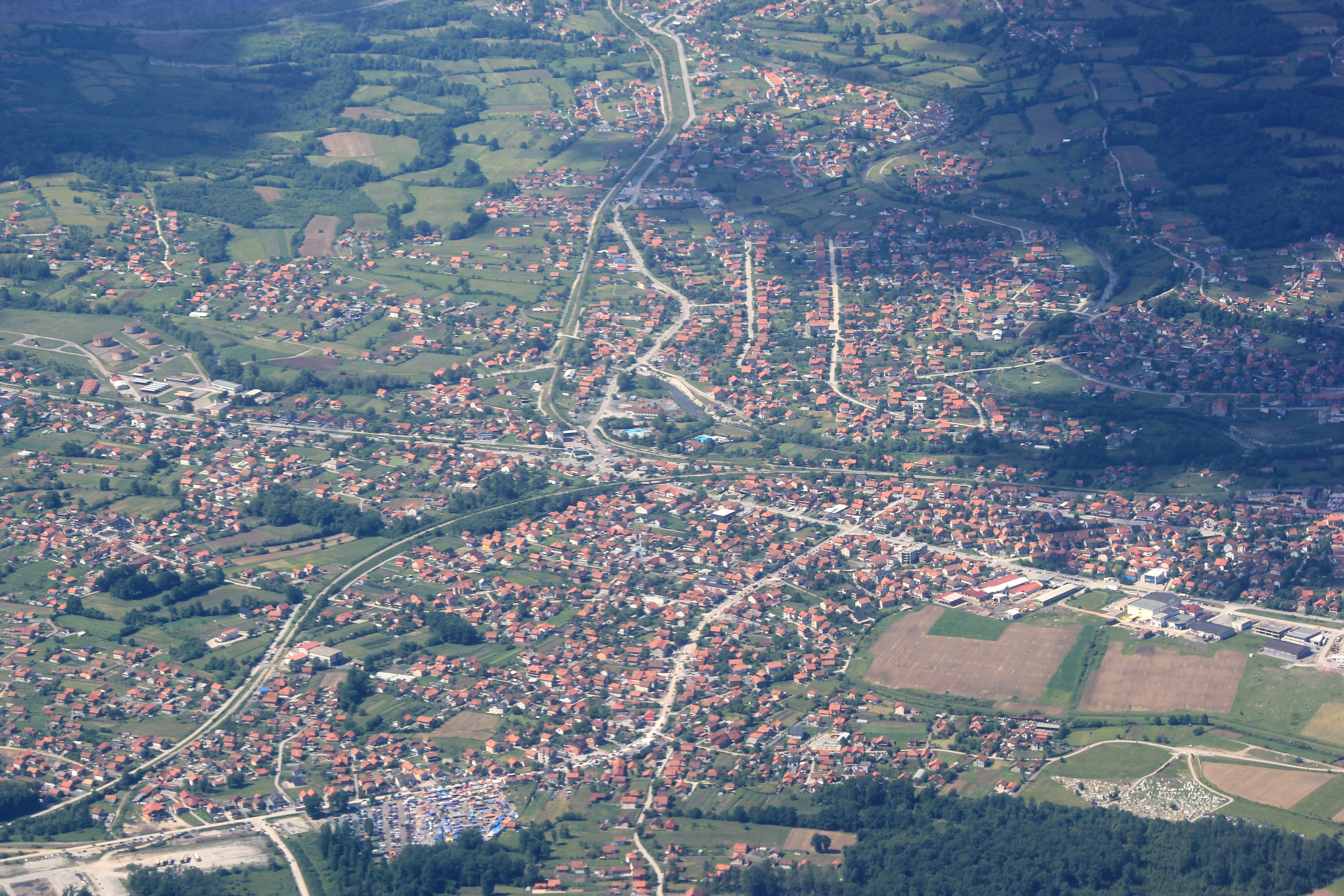
- Aerial view of Živinice

- Flag Coat of arms

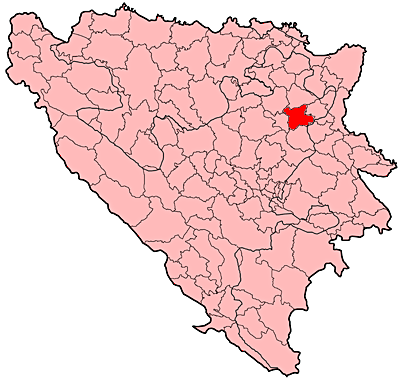
- Location of Živinice within Bosnia and Herzegovina.

- Location of Živinice
- Coordinates: 44°27′N 18°39′E
- Country: Bosnia and Herzegovina
- Entity: Federation of Bosnia and Herzegovina
- Canton: Tuzla Canton

Government
  - Mayor: Began Muhić (SDA)

Area
  - Total: 291 km^{2} (112 sq mi)

Population (2013 census)
  - Total: 57,765
  - Density: 19,850/km^{2} (51,400/sq mi)
- Time zone: UTC+1 (CET)
  - Summer (DST): UTC+2 (CEST)
- Postal code: 75270
- Area code: +387 35
- Website: gradzivinice.ba

Živinice is a town located in Tuzla Canton in the Federation of Bosnia and Herzegovina, an entity of Bosnia and Herzegovina. It is located in northeastern Bosnia and Herzegovina, south of Tuzla. As of 2013, it has a population of 57,765 inhabitants.

== History ==
In the 7th century, Slavic tribes settled permanently in the area of the town of Živinice. The medieval territory of Živinice was part of the Bosnian state, the areas of Gostilj, Dramešin and Soli as independent political units that lost those attributes before the arrival of the Ottomans in Bosnia. The settlement of Živinice as an urban location probably originated in the 18th century.

The municipality of Živinice was formed on 19. June 1959, after a decision by the National Assembly of the People's Republic of Bosnia and Herzegovina was passed.

The origin of the name Živinice is still unknown. According to historian Muhamed Hadžijahić Živinice was mentioned in an Ottoman document of 1764 that stated: "Živinice called Uskopči, probably (Oskovci) in nahiya Tuzla".

== Demographics ==
=== 1991 Census ===
In the 1991 census, the municipality of Živinice had 54,783 inhabitants, of which there were:

- 44,017 Muslims (80.34%)
- 3,976 Croats (7.25%)
- 3,525 Serbs (6.43%)
- 2,130 Yugoslavs (3.88%)
- 1,135 others or unknown (2.07%)

The town of Živinice itself had 11,956 residents. By the last documents, Živinice had 12,102 residents.

=== 2013 Census ===
Municipality	Nationality						Total
Municipality	Bosniaks	%	Croats	%	Serbs	%	Total
Živinice	53,089	91.91	2,508	4.34	242	0.42	57,765

== Sport ==
- NK Slaven Živinice
- KK Živinice
- KK Basket Živinice
- RK Konjuh Živinice

== Local communities ==
Bašigovci, Barice, Dubrave Donje, Dubrave Gornje, Đurđevik, Gračanica, Kovači, Litve, Lukavica Donja, Lukavica Gornja, Oskova, Priluk, Podgajevi, Rudar, Stari Đurđevik, Suha, Svojat, Šerići, Šišći, Šahići, Tupković, Višća Donja, Višća Gornja, Zelenika, Živinice Gornje, Živinice Centar.

== Notable residents ==
- Jusuf Nurkić, basketball player
- Elvir Rahimić, footballer
- Boris Živković, footballer
- Admir Mujabasic, table tennis player
- Enis Mujabasic, table tennis player
- Jasmin Fejzić, football goalkeeper
- Mirsad Bešlija, footballer
- Samir Memišević, footballer
- Denijal Piric, footballer
- Adnan Babajić, singer, the winner of the talent show Operacija trijumf

== Monuments ==
- Statue of Josip Broz Tito
- Monument to fighters killed in The Bosnian War

== Education ==
- Živinice has nine elementary schools and two high schools.
