= Seona =

Seona may refer to:

- Seona, Banovići, a village in Bosnia and Herzegovina
- Seona, Srebrenik, a village in Bosnia and Herzegovina
- Seona, Novi Travnik, a village in Bosnia and Herzegovina
- Seona, Croatia, a village near Donja Motičina
