= Srebrenik Castle =

Medieval fortress in Bosnia and Herzegovina

Srebrenik Fortress
- Srebrenik, Bosnia and Herzegovina
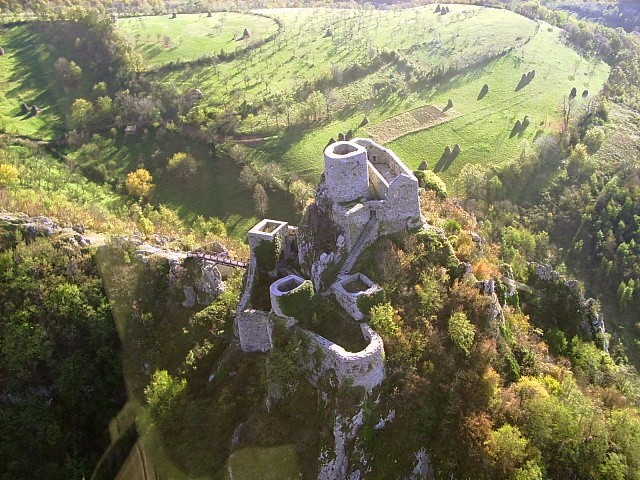
- Srebrenik Fortress - view from air, northern side

Site information
- Controlled by: medieval Bosnian state
- Condition: restored

Location
- Coordinates: 44.703641°N 18.531371°E

Site history
- Built: 13th century
- Materials: limestone

Garrison information
- Occupants: Stephen II, Ban of Bosnia
- Designations

KONS of Bosnia and Herzegovina
- Official name: "Old Srebrenik Fort, the historic site (2508)".
- Type: Category II property, immovable cultural monument
- Criteria: A, B, D i.ii., E iii.v., F ii.iii., G v., I iii.
- Designated: 2 November 2004 (?th session)06-6-976/03-2
- Reference no.: 2508
- State: National Monuments of Bosnia and Herzegovina

Srebrenik Fortress (Bosnian, Croatian and Serbian: Tvrđava Srebrenik / Тврђава Сребреник; also known as: Gradina / Градина) is a fortress located near the city of Srebrenik in Bosnia and Herzegovina. It has been a national monument of Bosnia and Herzegovina since 2 November 2004.

== Location ==
The fortress is located on the northeastern slopes of Majevica mountain in the village of Gornji Srebrenik, about 5 km away from the city centre. It is built on a steep, almost inaccessible rock, with a deep trench dug underneath, with the only entrance being a small bridge.

== History ==
No current historical sources identify the exact year of its construction or who its constructor was. Earliest records date back to edicts of Stephen II to Ragusa from 1333.

It was located on, at the time, important military roads which made it an important strategic stronghold. Already in 1363, king Louis I of Hungary sent an army to Bosnia, led by his palatine Nicholas Kont, which suffered significant losses under Srebrenik.

In 1393 it was captured by Hungarian king Sigismund of Luxembourg and within the next decades it changed rulers several times, with Hungarians recapturing it in 1405, 1408 and 1410 respectively. It was then granted as a gift to Serbian despot Stefan Lazarević, but remained in use by the Hungarians as a garrison. King Thomas of Bosnia managed to recapture it by 1433, but already in 1452 it was seized by Đurađ Branković, nephew of Stefan Lazarević, who gave it to Hungarians.

By 1462 the entire župa Usora was under Ottoman control, including Srebrenik. Due to failures in logistics and an epidemic, the Ottoman army had to retreat and Matthias Corvinus managed to seize back Srebrenik. In order to further improve defense against future Ottoman attacks, Matthias created Banate of Srebrenik in 1464 and granted it to Nicholas of Ilok who later became the titular king of Bosnia.

It is not known when the Ottomans recaptured it, but sometime between 1510 and 1519 is the most likely date.

Ever since the Battle of Mohács and up to Treaty of Karlowitz, due to expansion of Ottoman borders, the fortress saw very little military activity. Because of that, it was either completely abandoned or left with only a small garrison.

The Srebrenik Castle belonged to the Smoluća Nahija, the prince was Vlatko, son of Vladimir. He had 8 sons of which 3 converted to Islam. Vlachs of this principality belonged to the settlements of Gnojica, Miričina, Kruševica, Gornja Smoluća, Puračić, Gornja Lukavica, Srednja Smoluća, Donja Smoluća, Devetak, Dobošnica and Čitluk. In the entire principality there was 153 Christian households with 214 tabis, and 63 Muslim households with 68 tabis

In the 18th century, with Ottoman borders shrinking, it regained its strategic importance. Austrian spies reported it as an old fortress without providing any detailed descriptions. At this time, it was already in dire need of reparations. Some reparations were carried out as early as 1756, but their circumstances and results remain unreported.

It finally ceased its use as a garrison in 1835 when the last soldier left it and was mostly abandoned ever after. The mosque, built by the Ottomans in early 16th century, was still maintained in the following years.

== Heritage designation ==
On 2 November 2004, the KONS of Bosnia and Herzegovina designated Srebrenik Fortress a National Monument of Bosnia and Herzegovina, under session number 05.2-2-246/04-2.

== Gallery ==
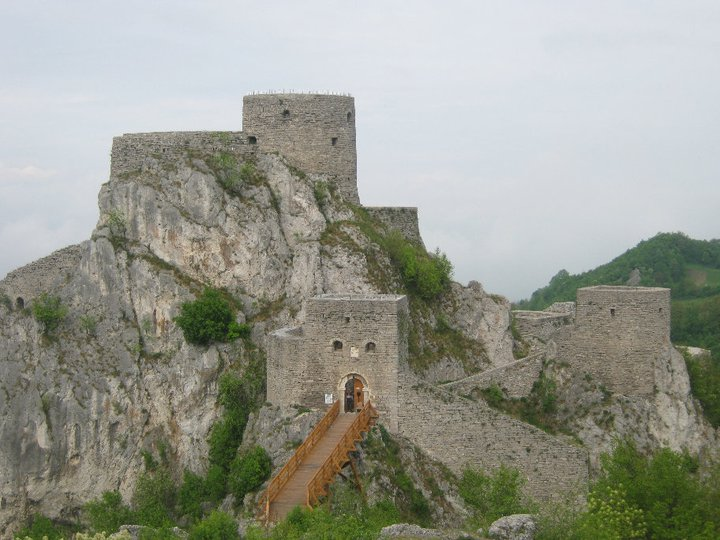
Srebrenik fortress - view from south

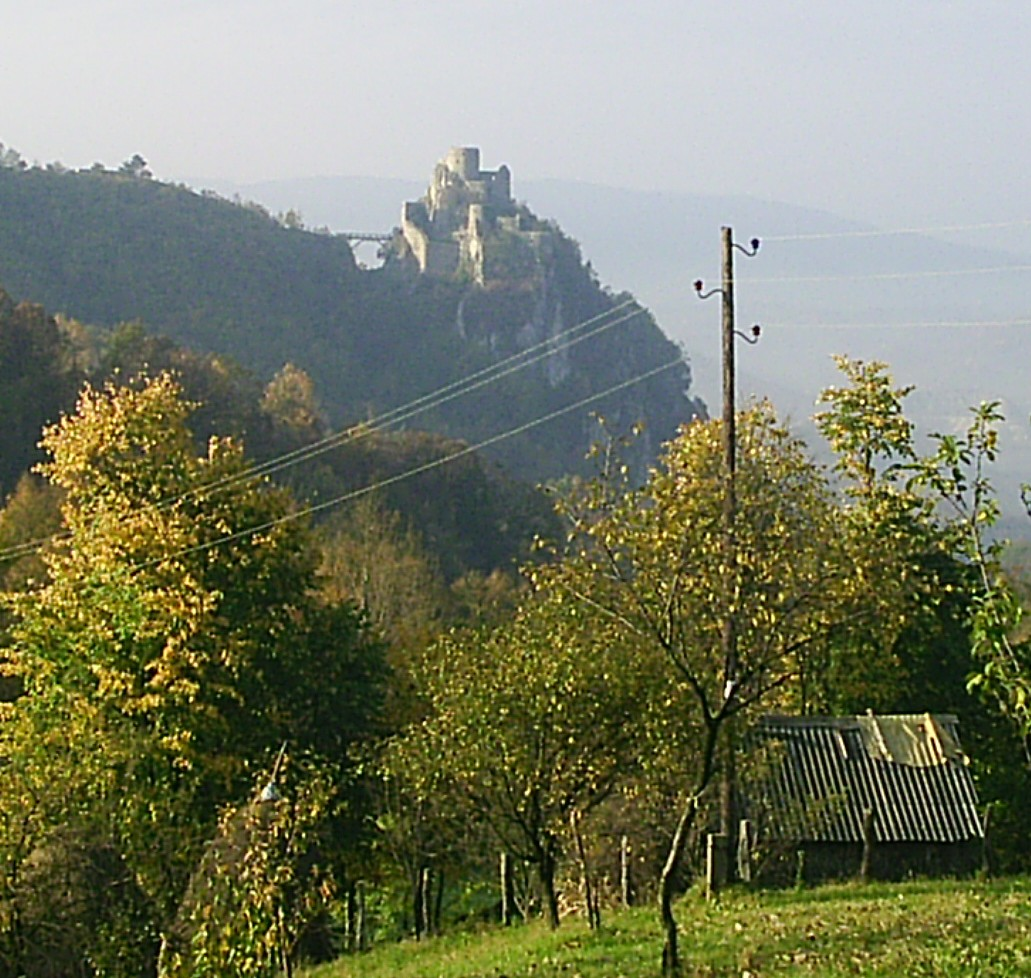
Srebrenik fortress - view from east

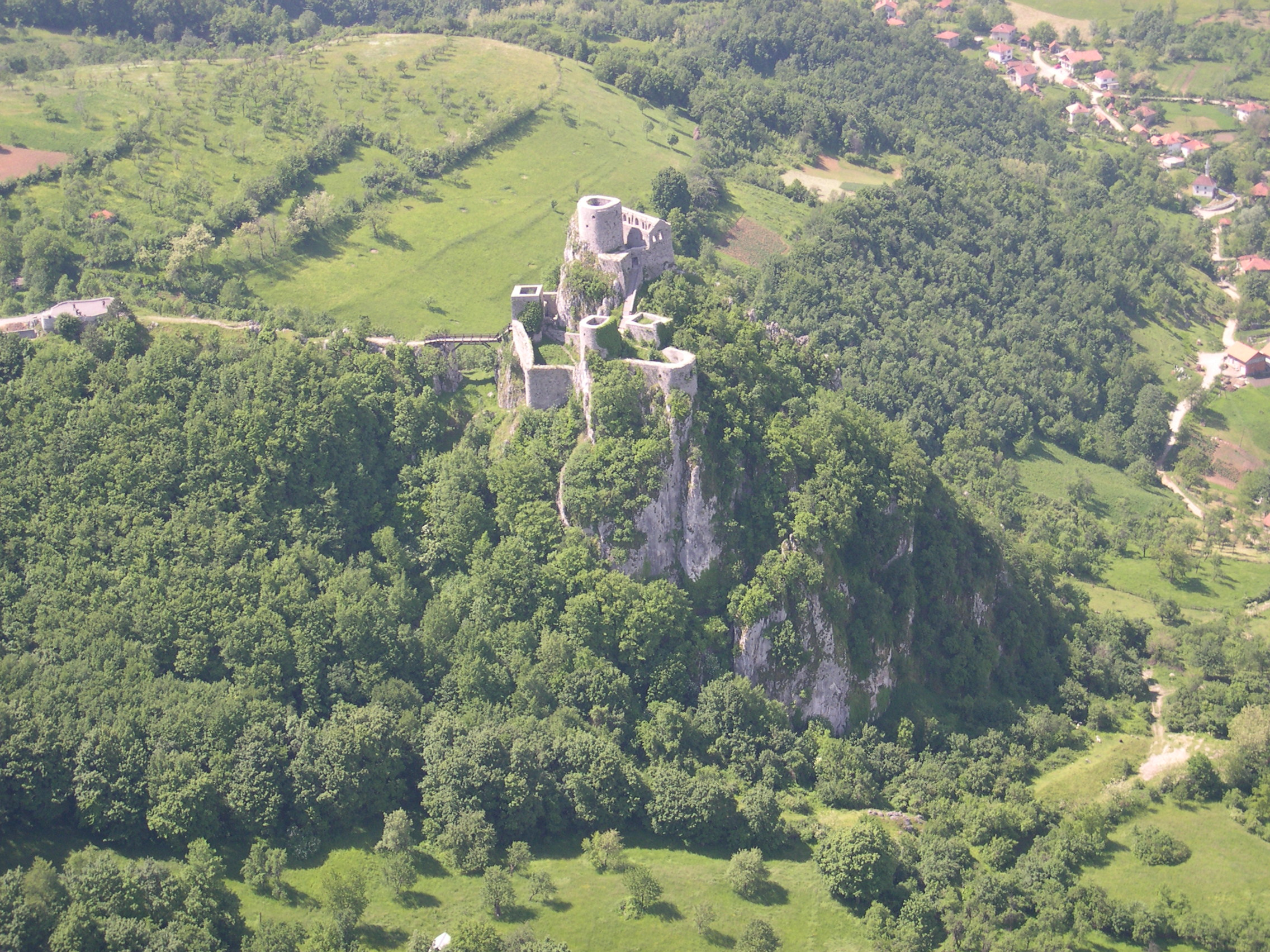

== See also ==
- Ljubuški Fortress
- List of castles in Bosnia and Herzegovina
