= Ćojluk =

- Village
- Location within Bosnia and Herzegovina
- Coordinates: 44°41′55″N 18°31′27″E
- Country: Bosnia and Herzegovina
- Entity: Federation of Bosnia and Herzegovina
- Canton: Tuzla
- Municipality: Srebrenik

Area
  - Total: 0.32 sq mi (0.83 km^{2})

Population (2013)
  - Total: 130
  - Density: 410/sq mi (160/km^{2})

Ćojluk is a village in the municipality of Srebrenik, Bosnia and Herzegovina.

== Demographics ==
According to the 2013 census, its population was 130, all Bosniaks.
