= Cage (Srebrenik) =

- Village
- Location within Bosnia and Herzegovina
- Coordinates: 44°39′07″N 18°29′11″E
- Country: Bosnia and Herzegovina
- Entity: Federation of Bosnia and Herzegovina
- Canton: Tuzla
- Municipality: Srebrenik

Area
  - Total: 2.53 sq mi (6.56 km^{2})

Population (2013)
  - Total: 480
  - Density: 190/sq mi (73/km^{2})

Cage is a village in the municipality of Srebrenik, Bosnia and Herzegovina.

== Demographics ==
According to the 2013 census, its population was 480.

Ethnicity in 2013
Ethnicity	Number	Percentage
Bosniaks	454	94.6%
Serbs	1	0.2%
other/undeclared	25	5.2%
Total	480	100%
