= Babunovići =

- Village
- Location within Bosnia and Herzegovina
- Coordinates: 44.71667°N 18.46667°E
- Country: Bosnia and Herzegovina
- Entity: Federation of Bosnia and Herzegovina
- Canton: Tuzla
- Municipality: Srebrenik

Area
  - Total: 1.86 sq mi (4.81 km^{2})

Population (2013)
  - Total: 1,775
  - Density: 956/sq mi (369/km^{2})

Babunovići is a village in the municipality of Srebrenik, Bosnia and Herzegovina.

== Demographics ==
According to the 2013 census, its population was 1,775.

Ethnicity in 2013
Ethnicity	Number	Percentage
Bosniaks	1,741	98.1%
Croats	4	0.2%
Serbs	0	0.0%
other/undeclared	30	1.7%
Total	1,775	100%
