= Zahirovići =

- Village
- Location within Bosnia and Herzegovina
- Coordinates: 44°40′43″N 18°33′30″E
- Country: Bosnia and Herzegovina
- Entity: Federation of Bosnia and Herzegovina
- Canton: Tuzla
- Municipality: Srebrenik

Area
  - Total: 1.51 sq mi (3.90 km^{2})

Population (2013)
  - Total: 700
  - Density: 460/sq mi (180/km^{2})
- Time zone: UTC+1 (CET)
  - Summer (DST): UTC+2 (CEST)

Zahirovići is a village in the municipality of Srebrenik, Bosnia and Herzegovina.

== Demographics ==
According to the 2013 census, its population was 700.

Ethnicity in 2013
Ethnicity	Number	Percentage
Bosniaks	684	97.7%
other/undeclared	16	2.3%
Total	700	100%
