= Ćojlučko Polje =

- Village
- Location within Bosnia and Herzegovina
- Country: Bosnia and Herzegovina
- Entity: Federation of Bosnia and Herzegovina
- Canton: Tuzla
- Municipality: Srebrenik

Area
  - Total: 0.56 sq mi (1.44 km^{2})

Population (2013)
  - Total: 401
  - Density: 721/sq mi (278/km^{2})

Ćojlučko Polje is a village in the municipality of Srebrenik, Bosnia and Herzegovina.

== Demographics ==
According to the 2013 census, its population was 401.

Ethnicity in 2013
Ethnicity	Number	Percentage
Bosniaks	378	94.3%
Croats	1	0.2%
other/undeclared	22	5.5%
Total	401	100%
