= Donji Moranjci =

- Village
- Location within Bosnia and Herzegovina
- Coordinates: 44°41′32″N 18°27′47″E
- Country: Bosnia and Herzegovina
- Entity: Federation of Bosnia and Herzegovina
- Canton: Tuzla
- Municipality: Srebrenik

Area
  - Total: 1.57 sq mi (4.07 km^{2})

Population (2013)
  - Total: 405
  - Density: 258/sq mi (99.5/km^{2})

Donji Moranjci is a village in the municipality of Srebrenik, Bosnia and Herzegovina.

== Demographics ==
According to the 2013 census, its population was 405.

Ethnicity in 2013
Ethnicity	Number	Percentage
Bosniaks	397	98.0%
Croats	1	0.2%
other/undeclared	7	1.7%
Total	405	100%
