= Špionica Donja =

- Village
- Location within Bosnia and Herzegovina
- Coordinates: 44°43′39″N 18°29′29″E
- Country: Bosnia and Herzegovina
- Entity: Federation of Bosnia and Herzegovina
- Canton: Tuzla
- Municipality: Srebrenik

Area
  - Total: 1.59 sq mi (4.13 km^{2})

Population (2013)
  - Total: 879
  - Density: 551/sq mi (213/km^{2})
- Time zone: UTC+1 (CET)
  - Summer (DST): UTC+2 (CEST)

Špionica Donja is a village in the municipality of Srebrenik, Bosnia and Herzegovina.

== Demographics ==
According to the 2013 census, its population was 879.

Ethnicity in 2013
Ethnicity	Number	Percentage
Bosniaks	853	97.0%
Serbs	15	1.7%
other/undeclared	11	1.3%
Total	879	100%
