= Sladna =

Sladna Сладна
- Village
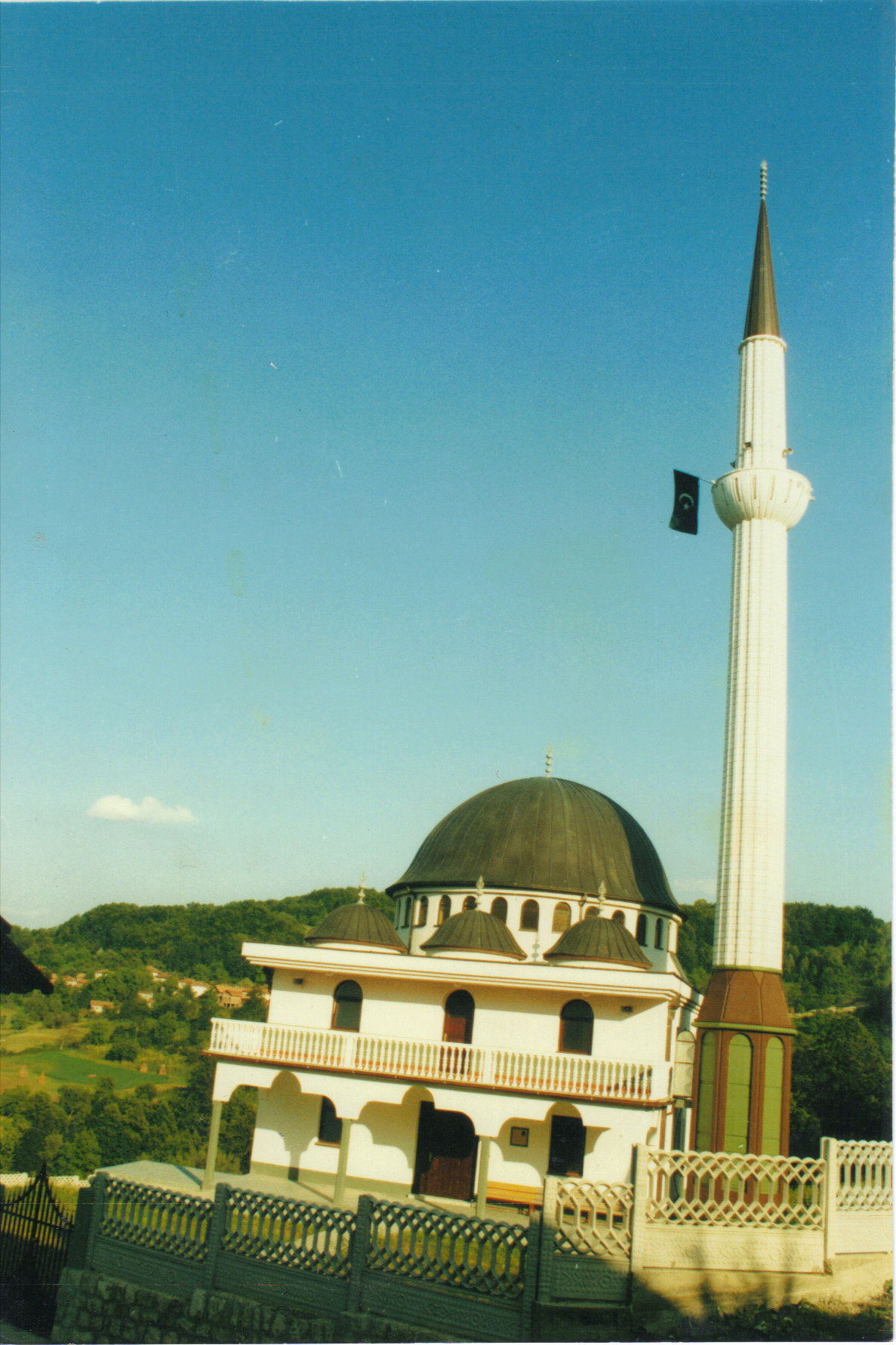

- Location within Bosnia and Herzegovina
- Coordinates: 44°43′46″N 18°25′27″E
- Country: Bosnia and Herzegovina
- Entity: Federation of Bosnia and Herzegovina
- Canton: Tuzla
- Municipality: Srebrenik

Area
  - Total: 8.50 sq mi (22.01 km^{2})

Population (2013)
  - Total: 2,867
  - Density: 337.4/sq mi (130.3/km^{2})
- Time zone: UTC+1 (CET)
  - Summer (DST): UTC+2 (CEST)
- Postal code: 75353

Sladna (Serbian: Сладна) is a village in the municipality of Srebrenik, Bosnia and Herzegovina.

== Demographics ==
According to the 2013 census, its population was 2,867.

Ethnicity in 2013
Ethnicity	Number	Percentage
Bosniaks	2,748	95.8%
Serbs	2	0.1%
Croats	1	0.0%
other/undeclared	116	4.0%
Total	2,867	100%
