= Crveno Brdo (Srebrenik) =

- Village
- Location within Bosnia and Herzegovina
- Coordinates: 44°40′46″N 18°35′54″E
- Country: Bosnia and Herzegovina
- Entity: Federation of Bosnia and Herzegovina
- Canton: Tuzla
- Municipality: Srebrenik

Area
  - Total: 0.82 sq mi (2.13 km^{2})

Population (2013)
  - Total: 213
  - Density: 259/sq mi (100/km^{2})

Crveno Brdo is a village in the municipality of Srebrenik, Bosnia and Herzegovina.

== Demographics ==
According to the 2013 census, its population was 213.

Ethnicity in 2013
Ethnicity	Number	Percentage
Bosniaks	210	97.7%
Serbs	1	0.5%
other/undeclared	4	1.9%
Total	213	100%
