= Šahmeri =

- Village
- Location within Bosnia and Herzegovina
- Coordinates: 44°40′43″N 18°28′35″E
- Country: Bosnia and Herzegovina
- Entity: Federation of Bosnia and Herzegovina
- Canton: Tuzla
- Municipality: Srebrenik

Area
  - Total: 0.30 sq mi (0.78 km^{2})

Population (2013)
  - Total: 108
  - Density: 360/sq mi (140/km^{2})
- Time zone: UTC+1 (CET)
  - Summer (DST): UTC+2 (CEST)

Šahmeri is a village in the municipality of Srebrenik, Bosnia and Herzegovina.

== Demographics ==
According to the 2013 census, its population was 108.

Ethnicity in 2013
Ethnicity	Number	Percentage
Bosniaks	107	99.1%
other/undeclared	1	0.9%
Total	108	100%
