= Rapatnica =

- Village
- Location within Bosnia and Herzegovina
- Coordinates: 44°41′49″N 18°29′02″E
- Country: Bosnia and Herzegovina
- Entity: Federation of Bosnia and Herzegovina
- Canton: Tuzla
- Municipality: Srebrenik

Area
  - Total: 1.23 km^{2} (0.47 sq mi)

Population (2013)
  - Total: 989
  - Density: 804/km^{2} (2,080/sq mi)
- Time zone: UTC+1 (CET)
  - Summer (DST): UTC+2 (CEST)

Rapatnica is a village in the municipality of Srebrenik, Bosnia and Herzegovina.

== Demographics ==
According to the 2013 census, its population was 989.

Ethnicity in 2013
Ethnicity	Number	Percentage
Bosniaks	936	94.6%
Serbs	1	0.1%
other/undeclared	52	5.3%
Total	989	100%
