= Gornji Podpeć =

Gornji Podpeć Горњи Подпећ
- Village
- Location within Bosnia and Herzegovina
- Coordinates: 44°39′33″N 18°33′15″E
- Country: Bosnia and Herzegovina
- Entity: Federation of Bosnia and Herzegovina
- Canton: Tuzla
- Municipality: Srebrenik

Area
  - Total: 1.96 sq mi (5.07 km^{2})

Population (2013)
  - Total: 60
  - Density: 31/sq mi (12/km^{2})

Gornji Podpeć (Serbian: Горњи Подпећ) is a village in the municipality of Srebrenik, Bosnia and Herzegovina.

== Demographics ==
According to the 2013 census, its population was 60. According to the 1991 census, its population was 732 and 729 were Serbs.

Ethnicity in 2013
Ethnicity	Number	Percentage
Bosniaks	40	66.7%
Serbs	19	31.7%
Croats	1	1.7%
Total	60	100%
