= Srebrenik =

Srebrenik Сребреник
- City
- Grad Srebrenik; Град Сребреник; City of Srebrenik
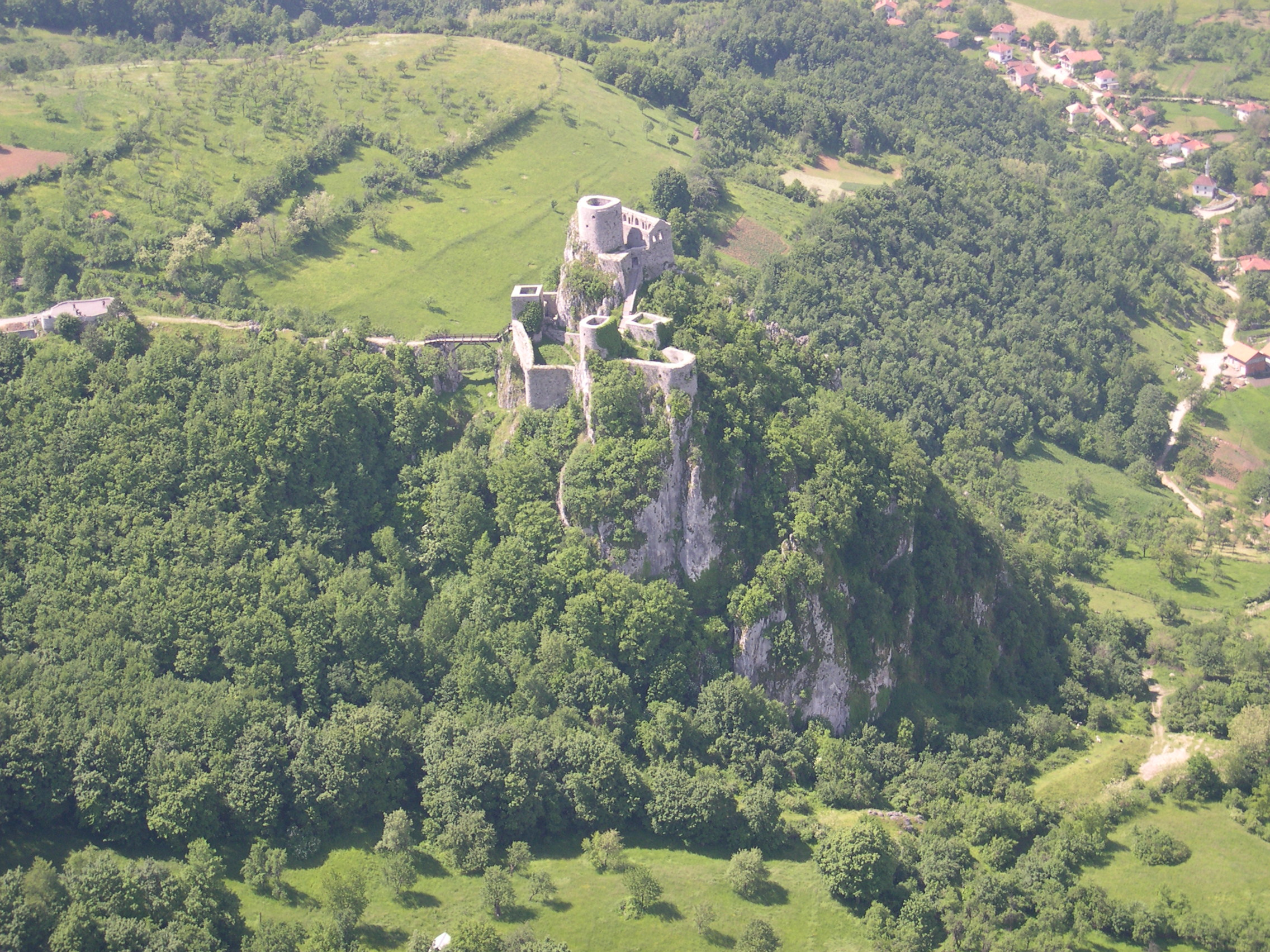
- Srebrenik Castle

- Seal

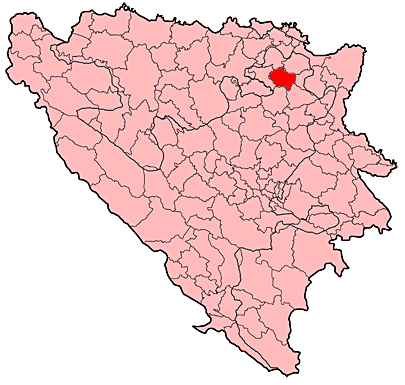
- Location of Srebrenik within Bosnia and Herzegovina

- Location within Bosnia and Herzegovina
- Coordinates: 44°42′N 18°29′E
- Country: Bosnia and Herzegovina
- Entity: Federation of Bosnia and Herzegovina
- Canton: Tuzla Canton

Government
  - Mayor: Adnan Bjelić (NiP)

Area
  - City: 96 sq mi (248 km^{2})
- Elevation: 827 ft (252 m)

Population (2013 census)
  - City: 39,678
  - Density: 414.4/sq mi (159.99/km^{2})
  - Urban: 6,694
- Time zone: UTC+1 (CET)
  - Summer (DST): UTC+2 (CEST)
- Area code: +387 35
- Website: www.srebrenik.ba

Srebrenik (Serbian Cyrillic: Сребреник) is a city located in Tuzla Canton of the Federation of Bosnia and Herzegovina. It is located in northeastern Bosnia and Herzegovina, near Tuzla. As of 2013, the city had a population of 39,678 inhabitants, while the urban centre itself had a population of 6,694.

== History ==
=== Prehistory ===
Based on unsystematic archaeological research, there have been found what appears to be remains of a Neolithic village near Hrgovi Gornji. Further research is required before any conclusions are made.

=== Middle ages ===
The earliest historical record documenting Srebrenik is the edict of Stephen II to Ragusa signed on 15 February, 1333. According to documents from the same period, Srebrenik was under the administration of župa Usora. Srebrenik fortress, a medieval fortress dating back to at least 1333, is located on the Majevica mountain, providing an important strategic stronghold in the area.

In September 1363, king Louis I of Hungary sent an army to Bosnia, led by his palatine Nicholas Kont. This army suffered substantial losses of Hungarian soldiers and materials in Srebrenik. Among the lost materials was the royal seal, which was replaced afterwards.

After the death of Louis I, numerous other Hungarian conquests occurred. One was led by Sigismund of Luxembourg, whose army besieged and conquered Srebrenik, holding out for the next four years. It was then granted to a Serbian despot Stefan Lazarević although the Hungarian army maintained its garrison for some time after the grant.

Srebrenik again fell under Bosnian control after it was conquered by grand duke Hrvoje Vukčić Hrvatinić. It is not known exactly when the city was recaptured by the Hungarians and for how long Hrvoje Vukčić had held the city.

Earliest accounts of Ottoman raiders near Srebrenik have been found in Ragusan letters directed to Sigismund in August 1426, detailing Ottoman activities as follows:

Almost the entire summer an army composed of about four thousand Turks was in Bosnia; neither the lord king of Bosnia nor his barons dared to do anything about them. Duke Sandalj and duke Radoslav Pavlović had managed to achieve peace among themselves. Turks raided parts of Croatia and captured many Croats and Vlachs dwelling there. They raided parts of Usora and Srebrenik twice; they were also present in the territories of duke Zlatonosović; these Turks have returned to their lands and few remained in Bosnia. The glorious lord despot, with his nephew Đurađ, as it was told, made peace with the Venetians in Zeta; a part of the land remained in possession of the lord despot and his nephew and the rest in the possession of the Venetians.

By 1462 the entire župa Usora was under Ottoman control, including Srebrenik. Due to failures in logistics and an epidemic, the Ottoman army had to retreat and Matthias Corvinus managed to seize back Srebrenik. In order to further improve the defense against future Ottoman attacks, Matthias created the banate of Srebrenik in 1464 and granted it to Nicholas of Ilok who later became the titular king of Bosnia.

There are two accounts related to the Ottoman conquest of Srebrenik. According to one, Srebrenik was taken in 1512, together with Teočak. The other version says that Srebrenik was taken together with Sokol and Tešanj in 1521 by the Bosnian sanjak-bey Feriz Beg.

== Demographics ==
Municipality	Nationality										Total
Municipality	Bosniaks	%	Croats	%	Serbs	%	Yugoslavs	%	Others	%	Total
1971	24,628	73.25	3,256	9.68	5,489	16.32	34	0.10	213	0.65	33,620
1991	30,595	74.8	2,761	6.8	5,326	13.0	—		2,200	5.4	40,882
2013	35,951	90.60	1,968	4.95	394	0.99	—		—		39,678

== List of residential places in the Srebrenik municipality ==
The list from 1991: Salihbašići, Babunovići, Behrami, Brda, Brezik, Brnjičani, Cage, Cerik, Crveno Brdo, Čekanići, Ćehaje, Ćojlučko Polje, Ćojluk, Dedići, Donji Moranjci, Donji Podpeć, Donji Srebrenik, Duboki Potok, Falešići, Gornji Hrgovi, Gornji Moranjci, Novo naselje Polje, Gornji Podpeć, Gornji Srebrenik, Huremi, Jasenica, Ježinac, Kiseljak, Kuge, Like, Lipje, Lisovići, Luka, Ljenobud, Maoča, Podorašje, Previle, Rapatnica, Seona, Sladna, Srebrenik, Straža, Šahmeri, Špionica Centar, Špionica Donja, Špionica Gornja, Špionica Srednja, Tinja Donja, Tinja Gornja, Tutnjevac, Uroža and Zahirovići.

== Sports ==
The local football club, NK Gradina, plays in the First League of the Federation of Bosnia and Herzegovina.

== See also ==
- Srebrenik Fortress
