= Luka, Srebrenik =

Luka Лука
- Village
- Location within Bosnia and Herzegovina
- Coordinates: 44°42′00″N 18°29′04″E
- Country: Bosnia and Herzegovina
- Entity: Federation of Bosnia and Herzegovina
- Canton: Tuzla
- Municipality: Srebrenik

Area
  - Total: 0.17 sq mi (0.45 km^{2})

Population (2013)
  - Total: 762
  - Density: 4,400/sq mi (1,700/km^{2})
- Time zone: UTC+1 (CET)
  - Summer (DST): UTC+2 (CEST)

Luka is a village in the municipality of Srebrenik, Bosnia and Herzegovina.

== Demographics ==
According to the 2013 census, its population was 762.

Ethnicity in 2013
Ethnicity	Number	Percentage
Bosniaks	724	95.0%
Croats	3	0.4%
other/undeclared	35	4.6%
Total	762	100%
