= Duboki Potok (Srebrenik) =

- Village
- Location within Bosnia and Herzegovina
- Country: Bosnia and Herzegovina
- Entity: Federation of Bosnia and Herzegovina
- Canton: Tuzla
- Municipality: Srebrenik

Area
  - Total: 1.27 sq mi (3.30 km^{2})

Population (2013)
  - Total: 2,040
  - Density: 1,600/sq mi (618/km^{2})

Duboki Potok is a village in the municipality of Srebrenik, Bosnia and Herzegovina.

== Demographics ==
According to the 2013 census, its population was 2,040.

Ethnicity in 2013
| Ethnicity | Number | Percentage |
|---|---|---|
| Bosniaks | 1,960 | 96.1% |
| Croats | 3 | 0.1% |
| Serbs | 5 | 0.2% |
| other/undeclared | 72 | 3.5% |
| Total | 2,040 | 100% |
