= Ćehaje =

- Village
- Location within Bosnia and Herzegovina
- Coordinates: 44°43′04″N 18°29′31″E
- Country: Bosnia and Herzegovina
- Entity: Federation of Bosnia and Herzegovina
- Canton: Tuzla
- Municipality: Srebrenik

Area
  - Total: 1.23 sq mi (3.19 km^{2})

Population (2013)
  - Total: 852
  - Density: 692/sq mi (267/km^{2})

Ćehaje is a village in the municipality of Srebrenik, Bosnia and Herzegovina.

== Demographics ==
According to the 2013 census, its population was 852.

Ethnicity in 2013
Ethnicity	Number	Percentage
Bosniaks	823	96.6%
Croats	6	0.7%
other/undeclared	23	2.7%
Total	852	100%
