= Straža, Bosnia and Herzegovina =

Straža Стража
- Village
- Location within Bosnia and Herzegovina
- Coordinates: 44°41′N 18°35′E
- Country: Bosnia and Herzegovina
- Entity: Federation of Bosnia and Herzegovina
- Canton: Tuzla
- Municipality: Srebrenik

Area
  - Total: 2.25 sq mi (5.82 km^{2})

Population (2013)
  - Total: 188
  - Density: 83.7/sq mi (32.3/km^{2})
- Time zone: UTC+1 (CET)
  - Summer (DST): UTC+2 (CEST)

Straža is a village in the municipality of Srebrenik, Bosnia and Herzegovina.

== Demographics ==
According to the 2013 census, its population was 188.

Ethnicity in 2013
Ethnicity	Number	Percentage
Croats	182	96.8%
Serbs	5	2.7%
other/undeclared	1	0.5%
Total	188	100%
