= Špionica Gornja =

- Village
- Location within Bosnia and Herzegovina
- Coordinates: 44°45′24″N 18°29′49″E
- Country: Bosnia and Herzegovina
- Entity: Federation of Bosnia and Herzegovina
- Canton: Tuzla
- Municipality: Srebrenik

Area
  - Total: 6.16 sq mi (15.95 km^{2})

Population (2013)
  - Total: 593
  - Density: 96.3/sq mi (37.2/km^{2})
- Time zone: UTC+1 (CET)
  - Summer (DST): UTC+2 (CEST)

Špionica Gornja is a village in the municipality of Srebrenik, Bosnia and Herzegovina.

== Demographics ==
According to the 2013 census, its population was 593.

Ethnicity in 2013
| Ethnicity | Number | Percentage |
|---|---|---|
| Bosniaks | 413 | 69.6% |
| Serbs | 142 | 23.9% |
| Croats | 1 | 0.2% |
| other/undeclared | 37 | 6.2% |
| Total | 593 | 100% |
