= Lisovići (Srebrenik) =

- Village
- Location within Bosnia and Herzegovina
- Coordinates: 44°38′26″N 18°34′40″E
- Country: Bosnia and Herzegovina
- Entity: Federation of Bosnia and Herzegovina
- Canton: Tuzla
- Municipality: Srebrenik
- Established: 1879

Area
  - Total: 0.69 sq mi (1.79 km^{2})
- Elevation: 1,020 ft (310 m)

Population (2013)
  - Total: 788
  - Density: 1,140/sq mi (440/km^{2})
- Time zone: UTC+1 (CET)
  - Summer (DST): UTC+2 (CEST)
- Postal code: 75355

Lisovići is a village in the municipality of Srebrenik, Bosnia and Herzegovina.

== Demographics ==
According to the 2013 census, its population was 788.

Ethnicity in 2013
Ethnicity	Number	Percentage
Bosniaks	769	97.6%
Croats	2	0.3%
other/undeclared	17	2.2%
Total	788	100%
