= Špionica Srednja =

- Village
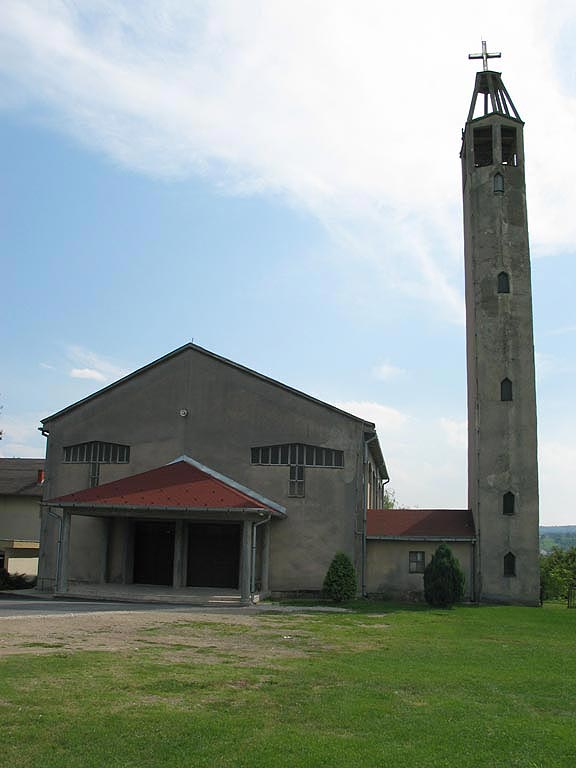

- Location within Bosnia and Herzegovina
- Coordinates: 44.7517°N 18.4714°E
- Country: Bosnia and Herzegovina
- Entity: Federation of Bosnia and Herzegovina
- Canton: Tuzla
- Municipality: Srebrenik

Area
  - Total: 3.97 sq mi (10.27 km^{2})

Population (2013)
  - Total: 1,079
  - Density: 272.1/sq mi (105.1/km^{2})
- Time zone: UTC+1 (CET)
  - Summer (DST): UTC+2 (CEST)

Špionica Srednja is a village in the municipality of Srebrenik, Bosnia and Herzegovina.

== Demographics ==
According to the 2013 census, its population was 1,079.

Ethnicity in 2013
Ethnicity	Number	Percentage
Croats	1,030	95.5%
Bosniaks	31	2.9%
Serbs	5	0.5%
other/undeclared	13	1.2%
Total	1,079	100%
