= Ježinac =

- Village
- Location within Bosnia and Herzegovina
- Coordinates: 44°43′33″N 18°29′22″E
- Country: Bosnia and Herzegovina
- Entity: Federation of Bosnia and Herzegovina
- Canton: Tuzla
- Municipality: Srebrenik

Area
  - Total: 0.93 sq mi (2.42 km^{2})

Population (2013)
  - Total: 593
  - Density: 635/sq mi (245/km^{2})

Ježinac is a village in the municipality of Srebrenik, Bosnia and Herzegovina.

== Demographics ==
According to the 2013 census, its population was 593.

Ethnicity in 2013
Ethnicity	Number	Percentage
Bosniaks	582	98.1%
other/undeclared	11	1.9%
Total	593	100%
