= Špionica Centar =

- Village
- Location within Bosnia and Herzegovina
- Coordinates: 44°45′00″N 18°28′12″E
- Country: Bosnia and Herzegovina
- Entity: Federation of Bosnia and Herzegovina
- Canton: Tuzla
- Municipality: Srebrenik

Area
  - Total: 0.35 sq mi (0.91 km^{2})

Population (2013)
  - Total: 647
  - Density: 1,800/sq mi (710/km^{2})
- Time zone: UTC+1 (CET)
  - Summer (DST): UTC+2 (CEST)

Špionica Centar is a village in the municipality of Srebrenik, Bosnia and Herzegovina.

== Demographics ==
According to the 2013 census, its population was 647.

Ethnicity in 2013
| Ethnicity | Number | Percentage |
|---|---|---|
| Bosniaks | 573 | 88.6% |
| Serbs | 26 | 4.0% |
| Croats | 4 | 0.6% |
| other/undeclared | 44 | 6.8% |
| Total | 647 | 100% |
