= Uroža =

- Village
- Location within Bosnia and Herzegovina
- Coordinates: 44°41′N 18°29′E
- Country: Bosnia and Herzegovina
- Entity: Federation of Bosnia and Herzegovina
- Canton: Tuzla
- Municipality: Srebrenik

Area
  - Total: 1.27 sq mi (3.29 km^{2})

Population (2013)
  - Total: 462
  - Density: 364/sq mi (140/km^{2})
- Time zone: UTC+1 (CET)
  - Summer (DST): UTC+2 (CEST)

Uroža is a village in the municipality of Srebrenik, Bosnia and Herzegovina.

== Demographics ==
According to the 2013 census, its population was 462.

Ethnicity in 2013
Ethnicity	Number	Percentage
Bosniaks	453	98.1%
Croats	1	0.2%
other/undeclared	8	1.7%
Total	462	100%
