= Podorašje =

- Village
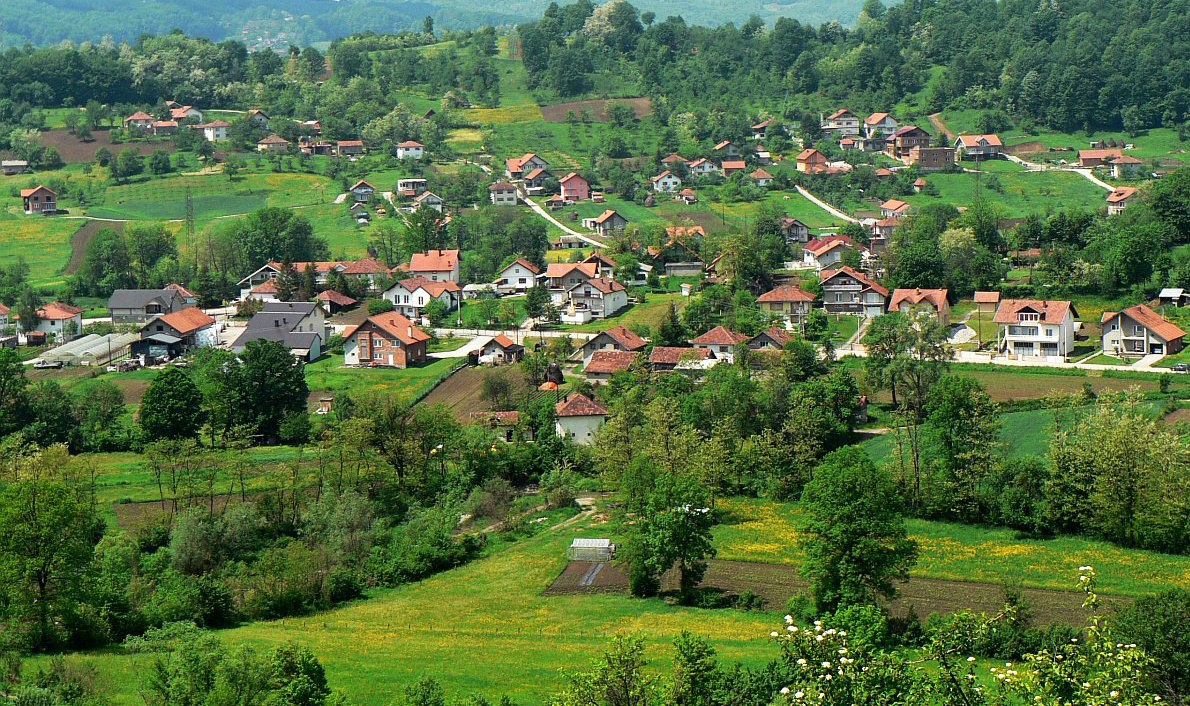

- Location within Bosnia and Herzegovina
- Coordinates: 44°38′N 18°35′E
- Country: Bosnia and Herzegovina
- Entity: Federation of Bosnia and Herzegovina
- Canton: Tuzla
- Municipality: Srebrenik

Area
  - Total: 1.25 sq mi (3.25 km^{2})

Population (2013)
  - Total: 982
  - Density: 783/sq mi (302/km^{2})
- Time zone: UTC+1 (CET)
  - Summer (DST): UTC+2 (CEST)

Podorašje is a village in the municipality of Srebrenik, Bosnia and Herzegovina.

== Demographics ==
According to the 2013 census, its population was 982.

Ethnicity in 2013
Ethnicity	Number	Percentage
Bosniaks	811	82.6%
Croats	129	13.1%
Serbs	4	0.4%
other/undeclared	38	3.9%
Total	982	100%
