= Brnjičani =

- Village
- Location within Bosnia and Herzegovina
- Coordinates: 44°42′17″N 18°27′00″E
- Country: Bosnia and Herzegovina
- Entity: Federation of Bosnia and Herzegovina
- Canton: Tuzla
- Municipality: Srebrenik

Area
  - Total: 1.10 sq mi (2.84 km^{2})

Population (2013)
  - Total: 424
  - Density: 387/sq mi (149/km^{2})

Brnjičani is a village in the municipality of Srebrenik, Bosnia and Herzegovina.

== Demographics ==
According to the 2013 census, its population was 424.

Ethnicity in 2013
Ethnicity	Number	Percentage
Bosniaks	420	99.1%
other/undeclared	4	0.9%
Total	424	100%
