= Gornji Moranjci =

- Village
- Location within Bosnia and Herzegovina
- Coordinates: 44°41′N 18°26′E
- Country: Bosnia and Herzegovina
- Entity: Federation of Bosnia and Herzegovina
- Canton: Tuzla
- Municipality: Srebrenik

Area
  - Total: 2.07 sq mi (5.35 km^{2})

Population (2013)
  - Total: 667
  - Density: 323/sq mi (125/km^{2})

Gornji Moranjci is a village in the municipality of Srebrenik, Bosnia and Herzegovina.

== Demographics ==
According to the 2013 census, its population was 667.

Ethnicity in 2013
Ethnicity	Number	Percentage
Bosniaks	649	97.3%
other/undeclared	18	2.7%
Total	667	100%
