= Gornji Hrgovi =

Village in Federation of Bosnia and Herzegovina,

- Village
- Location within Bosnia and Herzegovina
- Coordinates: 44°46′11″N 18°31′24″E
- Country: Bosnia and Herzegovina
- Entity: Federation of Bosnia and Herzegovina
- Canton: Tuzla
- Municipality: Srebrenik

Area
  - Total: 2.52 sq mi (6.53 km^{2})

Population (2013)
  - Total: 358
  - Density: 142/sq mi (54.8/km^{2})

Gornji Hrgovi is a village in the municipality of Srebrenik, Bosnia and Herzegovina.

== Demographics ==
According to the 2013 census, its population was 358.

Ethnicity in 2013
Ethnicity	Number	Percentage
Croats	346	96.6%
Bosniaks	7	2.0%
Serbs	2	0.6%
other/undeclared	3	0.8%
Total	358	100%
