= Ljenobud =

- Village
- Location within Bosnia and Herzegovina
- Coordinates: 44.6757°N 18.5005°E
- Country: Bosnia and Herzegovina
- Entity: Federation of Bosnia and Herzegovina
- Canton: Tuzla
- Municipality: Srebrenik

Area
  - Total: 1.97 sq mi (5.10 km^{2})

Population (2013)
  - Total: 702
  - Density: 357/sq mi (138/km^{2})
- Time zone: UTC+1 (CET)
  - Summer (DST): UTC+2 (CEST)

Ljenobud is a village in the municipality of Srebrenik, Bosnia and Herzegovina.

== Demographics ==
According to the 2013 census, its population was 702.

Ethnicity in 2013
| Ethnicity | Number | Percentage |
|---|---|---|
| Bosniaks | 664 | 94.6% |
| other/undeclared | 38 | 5.4% |
| Total | 702 | 100% |
