= Like, Srebrenik =

Like
- Village
- Location within Bosnia and Herzegovina
- Coordinates: 44°41′16″N 18°33′34″E
- Country: Bosnia and Herzegovina
- Entity: Federation of Bosnia and Herzegovina
- Canton: Tuzla
- Municipality: Srebrenik

Area
  - Total: 0.76 sq mi (1.96 km^{2})

Population (2013)
  - Total: 243
  - Density: 321/sq mi (124/km^{2})

Like is a village in the municipality of Srebrenik, Bosnia and Herzegovina.

== Demographics ==
According to the 2013 census, its population was 243, all Bosniaks.
