= Donji Srebrenik =

- Village
- Location within Bosnia and Herzegovina
- Coordinates: 44°42′45″N 18°30′57″E
- Country: Bosnia and Herzegovina
- Entity: Federation of Bosnia and Herzegovina
- Canton: Tuzla
- Municipality: Srebrenik

Area
  - Total: 1.69 sq mi (4.39 km^{2})

Population (2013)
  - Total: 627
  - Density: 370/sq mi (143/km^{2})

Donji Srebrenik is a village in the municipality of Srebrenik, Bosnia and Herzegovina.

== Demographics ==
According to the 2013 census, its population was 627.

Ethnicity in 2013
Ethnicity	Number	Percentage
Bosniaks	604	96.3%
Croats	3	0.5%
other/undeclared	21	3.2%
Total	627	100%
