= Tinja Gornja =

- Village
- Location within Bosnia and Herzegovina
- Coordinates: 44°37′N 18°34′E
- Country: Bosnia and Herzegovina
- Entity: Federation of Bosnia and Herzegovina
- Canton: Tuzla
- Municipality: Srebrenik

Area
  - Total: 2.32 sq mi (6.00 km^{2})

Population (2013)
  - Total: 2,159
  - Density: 932/sq mi (360/km^{2})
- Time zone: UTC+1 (CET)
  - Summer (DST): UTC+2 (CEST)

Tinja Gornja is a village in the municipality of Srebrenik, Bosnia and Herzegovina.

== Demographics ==
According to the 2013 census, its population was 2,159.

Ethnicity in 2013
| Ethnicity | Number | Percentage |
|---|---|---|
| Bosniaks | 2,068 | 95.8% |
| Croats | 4 | 0.2% |
| Serbs | 1 | 0.0% |
| other/undeclared | 86 | 4.0% |
| Total | 2,159 | 100% |
