= Huremi =

- Village
- Location within Bosnia and Herzegovina
- Coordinates: 44°43′46″N 18°31′07″E
- Country: Bosnia and Herzegovina
- Entity: Federation of Bosnia and Herzegovina
- Canton: Tuzla
- Municipality: Srebrenik

Area
  - Total: 1.56 sq mi (4.04 km^{2})

Population (2013)
  - Total: 354
  - Density: 227/sq mi (87.6/km^{2})

Huremi is a village in the municipality of Srebrenik, Bosnia and Herzegovina.

== Demographics ==
According to the 2013 census, its population was 354.

Ethnicity in 2013
Ethnicity	Number	Percentage
Bosniaks	351	99.2%
other/undeclared	3	0.8%
Total	354	100%
