= Donji Podpeć =

- Village
- Location within Bosnia and Herzegovina
- Coordinates: 44°38′34″N 18°32′51″E
- Country: Bosnia and Herzegovina
- Entity: Federation of Bosnia and Herzegovina
- Canton: Tuzla
- Municipality: Srebrenik

Area
  - Total: 2.84 sq mi (7.35 km^{2})

Population (2013)
  - Total: 703
  - Density: 248/sq mi (95.6/km^{2})

Donji Podpeć is a village in the municipality of Srebrenik, Bosnia and Herzegovina.

== Demographics ==
According to the 2013 census, its population was 703.

Ethnicity in 2013
Ethnicity	Number	Percentage
Bosniaks	666	94.7%
Serbs	21	3.0%
Croats	4	0.6%
other/undeclared	12	1.7%
Total	703	100%
