= Tinja Donja =

- Village
- Location within Bosnia and Herzegovina
- Coordinates: 44°38′N 18°34′E
- Country: Bosnia and Herzegovina
- Entity: Federation of Bosnia and Herzegovina
- Canton: Tuzla
- Municipality: Srebrenik

Area
  - Total: 1.51 sq mi (3.90 km^{2})

Population (2013)
  - Total: 1,482
  - Density: 984/sq mi (380/km^{2})
- Time zone: UTC+1 (CET)
  - Summer (DST): UTC+2 (CEST)

Tinja Donja is a village in the municipality of Srebrenik, Bosnia and Herzegovina.

== Demographics ==
According to the 2013 census, its population was 1,482.

National structure of the population in Tinja Donja
Ethnicity	2013	1991
Bosniaks	1,395	634
Serbs	34	878
Croats	8	20
other/undeclared	45	28
Total	1,482	1,560
