= Falešići =

- Village
- Location within Bosnia and Herzegovina
- Coordinates: 44°42′00″N 18°26′12″E
- Country: Bosnia and Herzegovina
- Entity: Federation of Bosnia and Herzegovina
- Canton: Tuzla
- Municipality: Srebrenik

Area
  - Total: 2.04 sq mi (5.28 km^{2})

Population (2013)
  - Total: 530
  - Density: 260/sq mi (100/km^{2})

Falešići is a village in the municipality of Srebrenik, Bosnia and Herzegovina.

== Demographics ==
According to the 2013 census, its population was 530.

Ethnicity in 2013
Ethnicity	Number	Percentage
Bosniaks	525	99.1%
other/undeclared	5	0.9%
Total	530	100%
