= Brezik (Srebrenik) =

- Village
- Location within Bosnia and Herzegovina
- Coordinates: 44°39′07″N 18°34′20″E
- Country: Bosnia and Herzegovina
- Entity: Federation of Bosnia and Herzegovina
- Canton: Tuzla
- Municipality: Srebrenik

Area
  - Total: 0.78 sq mi (2.01 km^{2})

Population (2013)
  - Total: 404
  - Density: 521/sq mi (201/km^{2})

Brezik is a village in Bosnia and Herzegovina. According to the 1991 census, the village is located in the municipality of Srebrenik.

== Demographics ==
According to the 2013 census, its population was 404.

Ethnicity in 2013
Ethnicity	Number	Percentage
Bosniaks	401	99.3%
other/undeclared	3	0.7%
Total	404	100%
