= Lipje (Srebrenik) =

- Village
- Location within Bosnia and Herzegovina
- Coordinates: 44°39′26″N 18°29′18″E
- Country: Bosnia and Herzegovina
- Entity: Federation of Bosnia and Herzegovina
- Canton: Tuzla
- Municipality: Srebrenik

Area
  - Total: 0.67 sq mi (1.74 km^{2})

Population (2013)
  - Total: 227
  - Density: 338/sq mi (130/km^{2})

Lipje is a village in the municipality of Srebrenik, Bosnia and Herzegovina.

== Demographics ==
According to the 2013 census, its population was 227.

Ethnicity in 2013
Ethnicity	Number	Percentage
Bosniaks	222	97.8%
other/undeclared	5	2.2%
Total	227	100%
