= Tutnjevac (Srebrenik) =

- Village
- Location within Bosnia and Herzegovina
- Coordinates: 44.7586°N 18.4781°E
- Country: Bosnia and Herzegovina
- Entity: Federation of Bosnia and Herzegovina
- Canton: Tuzla
- Municipality: Srebrenik

Area
  - Total: 0.90 sq mi (2.34 km^{2})

Population (2013)
  - Total: 345
  - Density: 382/sq mi (147/km^{2})
- Time zone: UTC+1 (CET)
  - Summer (DST): UTC+2 (CEST)

Tutnjevac is a village in the municipality of Srebrenik, Bosnia and Herzegovina.

== Demographics ==
According to the 2013 census, its population was 345.

Ethnicity in 2013
Ethnicity	Number	Percentage
Bosniaks	332	96.2%
Croats	5	1.4%
other/undeclared	8	2.3%
Total	345	100%
