= Čekanići =

- Village
- Location within Bosnia and Herzegovina
- Coordinates: 44°42′16″N 18°24′48″E
- Country: Bosnia and Herzegovina
- Entity: Federation of Bosnia and Herzegovina
- Canton: Tuzla
- Municipality: Srebrenik

Area
  - Total: 1.95 sq mi (5.05 km^{2})

Population (2013)
  - Total: 480
  - Density: 250/sq mi (95/km^{2})

Čekanići is a village in the municipality of Srebrenik, Bosnia and Herzegovina.

== Demographics ==
According to the 2013 census, its population was 480.

Ethnicity in 2013
Ethnicity	Number	Percentage
Bosniaks	474	98.8%
other/undeclared	6	1.3%
Total	480	100%
