= Cerik (Srebrenik) =

- Village
- Location within Bosnia and Herzegovina
- Coordinates: 44°46′09″N 18°29′15″E
- Country: Bosnia and Herzegovina
- Entity: Federation of Bosnia and Herzegovina
- Canton: Tuzla
- Municipality: Srebrenik

Area
  - Total: 1.37 sq mi (3.54 km^{2})

Population (2013)
  - Total: 244
  - Density: 179/sq mi (68.9/km^{2})

Cerik is a village in the municipality of Srebrenik, Bosnia and Herzegovina.

== Demographics ==
According to the 2013 census, its population was 244.

Ethnicity in 2013
Ethnicity	Number	Percentage
Croats	136	55.7%
Bosniaks	97	39.8%
Serbs	5	2.0%
other/undeclared	6	2.5%
Total	244	100%
