= Dedići =

Village in Bosnia and Herzegovina

- Village
- Location within Bosnia and Herzegovina
- Coordinates: 44°39′58″N 18°29′13″E
- Country: Bosnia and Herzegovina
- Entity: Federation of Bosnia and Herzegovina
- Canton: Tuzla
- Municipality: Srebrenik

Area
  - Total: 0.66 sq mi (1.71 km^{2})

Population (2013)
  - Total: 761
  - Density: 1,150/sq mi (445/km^{2})

Dedići is a village in the municipality of Srebrenik, Bosnia and Herzegovina.

== Demographics ==
According to the 2013 census, its population was 761.

Ethnicity in 2013
Ethnicity	Number	Percentage
Bosniaks	734	96.5%
other/undeclared	27	3.5%
Total	761	100%
