= Jasenica (Srebrenik) =

- Village
- Location within Bosnia and Herzegovina
- Coordinates: 44.6692°N 18.6147°E
- Country: Bosnia and Herzegovina
- Entity: Federation of Bosnia and Herzegovina
- Canton: Tuzla
- Municipality: Srebrenik

Area
  - Total: 8.43 sq mi (21.83 km^{2})

Population (2013)
  - Total: 251
  - Density: 29.8/sq mi (11.5/km^{2})

Jasenica is a village in the municipality of Srebrenik, Bosnia and Herzegovina.

== Demographics ==
According to the 2013 census, its population was 251.

Ethnicity in 2013
| Ethnicity | Number | Percentage |
|---|---|---|
| Bosniaks | 194 | 77.3% |
| Serbs | 39 | 15.5% |
| Croats | 1 | 0.4% |
| other/undeclared | 17 | 6.8% |
| Total | 251 | 100% |
