= Behrami =

- Village
- Location within Bosnia and Herzegovina
- Coordinates: 44°40′26″N 18°29′16″E
- Country: Bosnia and Herzegovina
- Entity: Federation of Bosnia and Herzegovina
- Canton: Tuzla
- Municipality: Srebrenik

Area
  - Total: 0.32 sq mi (0.82 km^{2})

Population (2013)
  - Total: 1,000
  - Density: 3,200/sq mi (1,200/km^{2})

Behrami is a village in Bosnia and Herzegovina. According to the 1991 census, the village is located in the municipality of Srebrenik.

== Demographics ==
According to the 2013 census, its population was 310.

Ethnicity in 2013
Ethnicity	Number	Percentage
Bosniaks	305	98.4%
other/undeclared	5	1.6%
Total	310	100%
