= Seona, Novi Travnik =

Seona
- Village
- Location within Bosnia and Herzegovina
- Coordinates: 44.0626°N 17.6880°E
- Country: Bosnia and Herzegovina
- Entity: Federation of Bosnia and Herzegovina
- Canton: Central Bosnia
- Municipality: Novi Travnik

Area
  - Total: 2.52 sq mi (6.53 km^{2})

Population (2013)
  - Total: 75
  - Density: 30/sq mi (11/km^{2})
- Time zone: UTC+1 (CET)
  - Summer (DST): UTC+2 (CEST)

Seona is a village in the municipality of Novi Travnik, Bosnia and Herzegovina.

== Demographics ==
According to the 2013 census, its population was 75, all Bosniaks.
