= Seona, Srebrenik =

Seona Сеона
- Village
- Location within Bosnia and Herzegovina
- Coordinates: 44°40′11″N 18°28′33″E
- Country: Bosnia and Herzegovina
- Entity: Federation of Bosnia and Herzegovina
- Canton: Tuzla
- Municipality: Srebrenik

Area
  - Total: 3.20 sq mi (8.28 km^{2})

Population (2013)
  - Total: 834
  - Density: 261/sq mi (101/km^{2})
- Time zone: UTC+1 (CET)
  - Summer (DST): UTC+2 (CEST)

Seona is a village in the municipality of Srebrenik, Bosnia and Herzegovina.

== Demographics ==
According to the 2013 census, its population was 834.

Ethnicity in 2013
Ethnicity	Number	Percentage
Bosniaks	815	97.7%
other/undeclared	19	2.3%
Total	834	100%
