= Gornji Srebrenik =

- Village
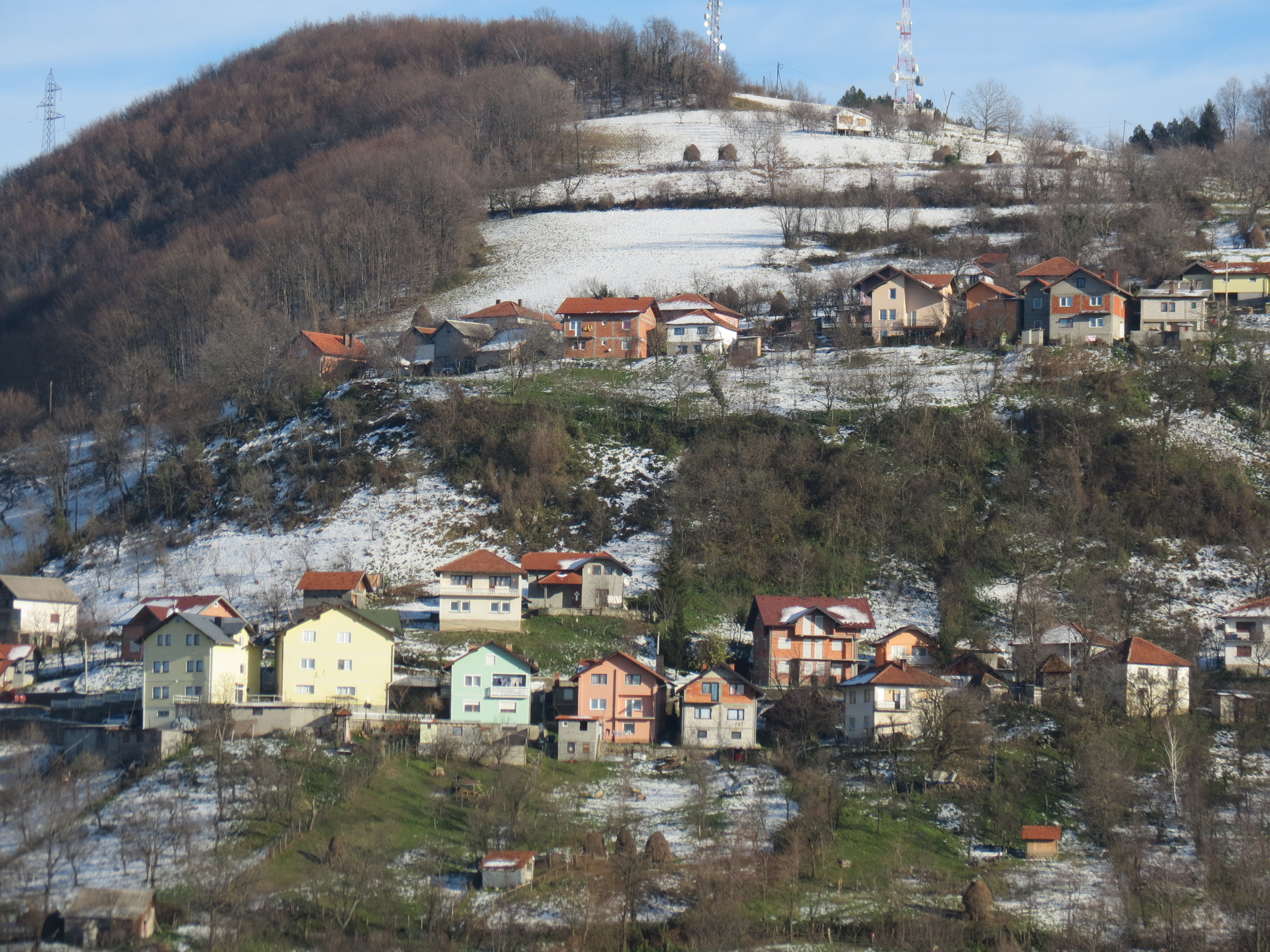

- Location within Bosnia and Herzegovina
- Coordinates: 44°42′01″N 18°32′17″E
- Country: Bosnia and Herzegovina
- Entity: Federation of Bosnia and Herzegovina
- Canton: Tuzla
- Municipality: Srebrenik

Area
  - Total: 4.29 sq mi (11.10 km^{2})

Population (2013)
  - Total: 704
  - Density: 164/sq mi (63.4/km^{2})

Gornji Srebrenik is a village in the municipality of Srebrenik, Bosnia and Herzegovina.

== Demographics ==
According to the 2013 census, its population was 704.

Ethnicity in 2013
Ethnicity	Number	Percentage
Bosniaks	649	92.2%
Croats	1	0.1%
Serbs	23	3.3%
other/undeclared	31	4.4%
Total	704	100%
