= Chetnik attack on the Užice Republic =

Part of World War II in Yugoslavia

Chetnik Attack on the Užice Republic
- Part of World War II in Yugoslavia and Uprising in Serbia (1941)
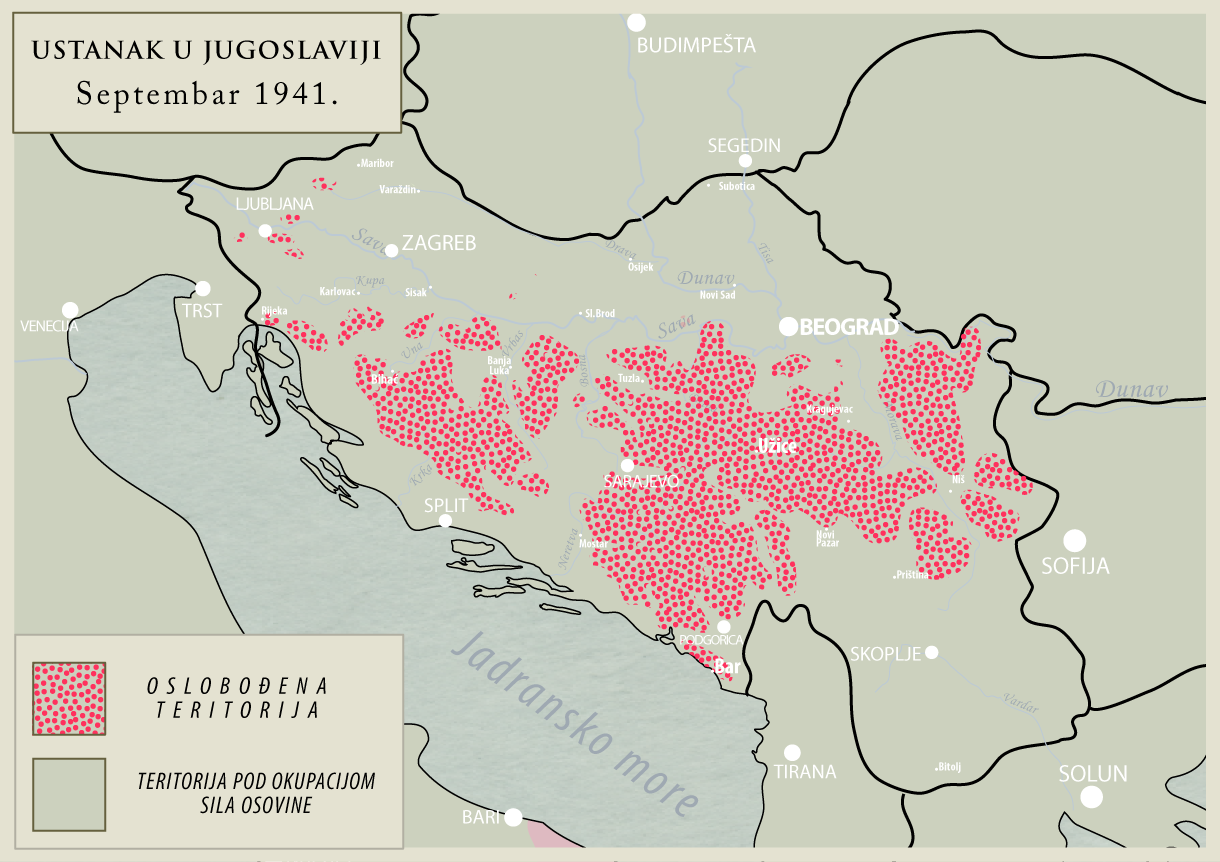
- Uprising in occupied Yugoslavia in 1941, which created the largest free territory in Europe.
Date	1–8 November 1941
Location	Užice Republic
Result	Partisan victory: Truce between Partisans and Chetniks; Mihailović's offer to the Germans; German forces and collaborators suppressed the uprising; Start of Civil war in occupied Yugoslavia

Belligerents
Chetniks; Chetniks of Kosta Pećanac (Serbia) Government of National Salvation; Serbian State Guard	Yugoslav Partisans

Commanders and leaders
(Chetniks) Draža Mihailović (Chetniks) Kosta Pećanac (Chetniks) Dragoslav Račić (Chetniks) Vučko Ignjatović (Chetniks) Miloš Glišić (Chetniks) Miloš Marković (Chetniks) Neško Nedić (Chetniks) Jovan Deroko † (Chetniks) Zvonimir Vučković (Chetniks) Bogdan Marjanović (Serbia) Milan Kalabić	(Yugoslav Partisans) Josip Broz Tito (Yugoslav Partisans) Radivoje Jovanović Bradonja (Socialist Federal Republic of Yugoslavia) Dušan Jerković (Yugoslav Partisans) Momčilo Radosavljević (executed) (Yugoslav Partisans) Srećko Nikolić †

The Chetnik attack on Užice in November 1941 was an attack by Chetniks under the command of Colonel Draža Mihailović against the Partisan-controlled free territory in Šumadija and Western Serbia, known as the Užice Republic.

The general Chetnik offensive against the Partisan territory centered in Užice followed Mihailović's agreement with General Nedić in early September and his offer of cooperation to the Germans at the end of October. Just prior to the attack, on 26 October 1941, Mihailović had signed the Brajići agreement with Partisan leader Josip Broz Tito, pledging non-aggression and joint struggle against the occupiers.

On the night of 1/2 November, the Chetniks attacked Užice but were repelled by the Partisans. They retreated to Požega, pursued by Partisan forces. While fighting raged around Požega, Mihailović ordered attacks on Partisans in Čačak and other towns. On 7–8 November, the Chetniks launched a second assault on Užice, which also failed. The battles around Čačak ended on 8 November with Chetnik defeat. At the same time, the Chetniks managed to seize control of Gornji Milanovac. These events were marked by the first recorded mass atrocities by Chetniks against captured Partisans and sympathizers of the resistance movement.

After the defeat of the main Chetnik columns, the Partisans pursued them toward the Ravna Gora plateau, where Mihailović’s headquarters was located. On 11 November 1941, Mihailović met with Wehrmacht representatives, offering collaboration in "restoring order" and handing over large numbers of captured Partisans, but was rejected due to the participation of his forces in the uprising. Following the major German offensive, the Partisan Supreme Command suspended operations against the Chetniks, and on 20 November in Čačak a truce was signed and a joint stand against the Wehrmacht was agreed.

However, joint resistance to the occupiers never materialized. The most important consequence of the Chetnik–Partisan conflict was the accelerated collapse of the uprising. The Germans easily crushed the divided insurgent forces, which until then had achieved significant successes. After the defeat of the Partisan uprising in Serbia in late November, German forces launched Operation Mihailović against Mihailović's headquarters in early December 1941.

The Partisan–Chetnik war, which began in Serbia, soon spread across occupied Yugoslavia and lasted until the end of World War II in Yugoslavia, culminating in the Chetnik defeat at Zelengora. Historian Branko Petranović assessed that the Chetnik attacks on Užice, Ivanjica, Čačak, Gornji Milanovac, and other towns of the free territory in early November 1941 marked the beginning of a "civil war in the shadow of the German offensive".

== Background ==
=== Uprising in Serbia 1941 ===
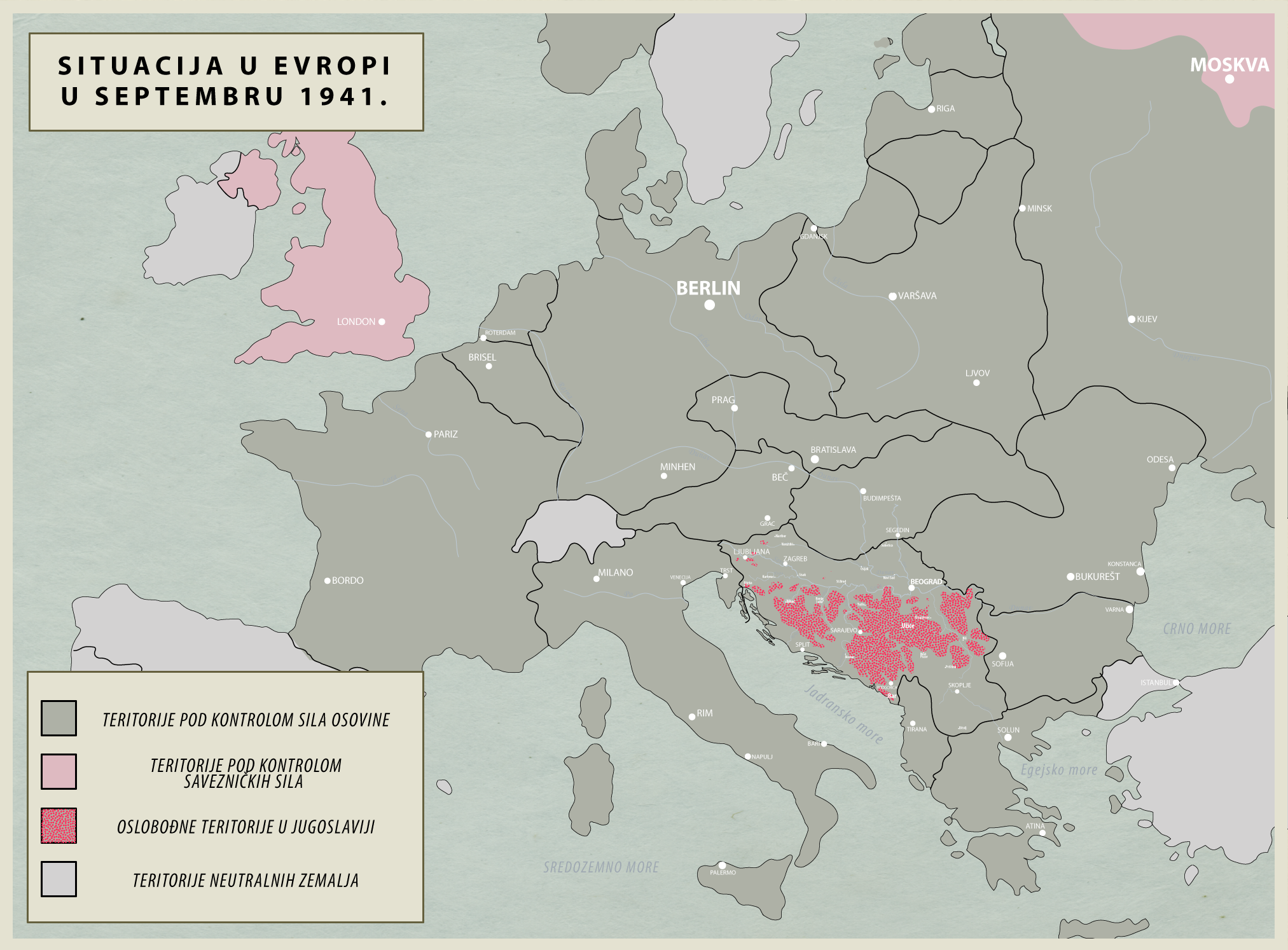
Uprising in Yugoslavia and Europe 1941.

The Communist Party of Yugoslavia initiated the uprising in occupied Yugoslavia in July 1941. Within a few months, a large part of occupied Yugoslavia was under the control of the insurgents.

When the partisan uprising gained momentum, Colonel Dragoljub Mihailović, who was hiding with his staff on Ravna Gora, began forming Chetnik detachments. Mihailović proclaimed himself commander of the remnants of the Yugoslav Army. He believed that he had the exclusive right to forcibly mobilize men into his units, while the partisans advocated voluntary mobilization. His detachments did not conduct any battles, but instead established contacts with organs of the collaborationist administration. Colonel Mihailović assessed that the occupier was stronger in every respect, and that fighting against him would be counterproductive.

After the formation of the first Partisan detachments in Serbia, more and more people joined the partisans. Some peasants refused to support officers who were "idling" on Ravna Gora. Through Neško Nedić, Colonel Mihailović made it clear to the communists that no one had the right to organize any kind of army except his officers, who were the only ones authorized to do so. He forbade attacks on gendarmes and Germans, or carrying out acts of sabotage. At the end of June or the beginning of July, Draža Mihailović entered into negotiations with collaborators Dimitrije Ljotić and Milan Aćimović on suppressing the uprising.

In August 1941, Colonel Mihailović ordered the "formation of companies of military conscripts" between the ages of 20–30. The task of these companies was to "patrol the surroundings or the fields of villages in order to prevent looting and violence" and by stronger organization to prevent the "destructive elements from gaining ground," i.e., to prevent the CPY from organizing the struggle against the occupier. In the case of a general uprising, the task of these companies was to take power into their own hands.

On 9 September 1941, Mihailović issued an instruction on the formation of Chetnik detachments. These units were tasked to "patrol the surroundings in order to prevent looting and violence." It was ordered that "conflicts with the Germans and Italians should be avoided as long as possible," and likewise with the "communists". Mihailović proclaimed himself the legitimate representative of the Yugoslav Army and, on the basis of war laws, demanded the response of military conscripts.

=== Mihailović's offer to Nedić ===
With the development of the partisan uprising, several Chetnik commanders independently joined the struggle against the occupiers. At the same time, as some of his officers were joining the uprising, Colonel Mihailović, in early September 1941, sent a delegation to meet with General Nedić in Belgrade to arrange joint action against the partisans. The delegation consisted of Lieutenant Colonel Dragoslav Pavlović, Lieutenant Colonel Živojin Đurić, and Major Aleksandar Mišić. With the approval of German General Harald Turner, General Milan Nedić agreed to cooperate with Colonel Mihailović:

Approximately three days after taking office as head of the government, Colonel Aleksandar Mišić appeared with two other officers on Mihailović’s orders and declared that Mihailović wished to fight alongside Prime Minister Nedić against the communists, requesting arms and equipment for 2,000 men, especially footwear. Nedić told Colonel Mišić that he could not provide shoes and suggested the use of peasant sandals (opanci). Among other things, he left Mihailović the task of clearing the area west of the Morava River. It should be emphasized that Nedić conducted these negotiations with my approval, since at that time there was hope that Nedić would command a large number of officers located not only in Belgrade but also in the forests. On 10 September, Mišić returned with the statement that Mihailović agreed to this task, after which Nedić sent him 200,000 dinars.

— Report of Harold Turner, 6 November 1941, on Draža Mihailović’s attempts to strengthen his position through negotiations with Nedić and the Germans for the fight against the communists

After the agreement with Nedić, Mihailović’s delegation returned to Ravna Gora on 6 September 1941. In the meantime, Major Marko Olujević, deputy commander of Nedić’s gendarmerie, also set out for Ravna Gora. On his way there, on 8 September 1941, he was captured by partisans, who found on him the gendarmerie command’s plan for a joint Chetnik–gendarmerie attack on the partisans along the Zvornik–Krupanj–Valjevo–Mionica line. After interrogation, Major Olujević was executed on 10 September.

=== Agreement between Mihailović and the partisans ===
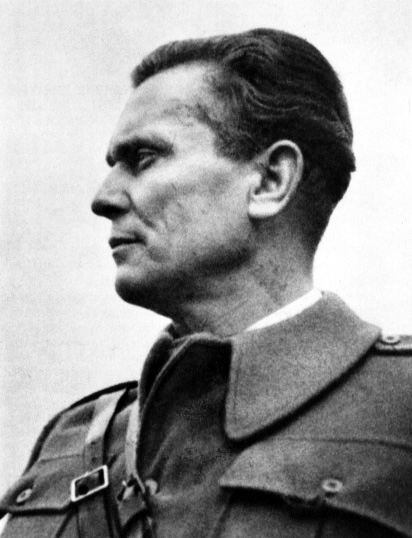
Partisan leader Tito

During the uprising of 1941, despite cooperation in the regions of western Serbia and Šumadija, disagreements, disputes, and even clashes occurred between partisan and Chetnik detachments. In October 1941, several meetings were held in the field between representatives of the two movements, which achieved partial success. In the meantime, the German occupier strengthened its forces directed towards western Serbia (Užice Republic) and launched heavy attacks on the liberated territory. The Supreme Headquarters of NOPOJ sought to unite all anti-occupation forces in Serbia in the fight against the occupiers, which is why it worked to resolve misunderstandings and prevent clashes with Colonel Mihailović’s movement, in order to reach a firmer agreement on future cooperation between the two movements.

After twenty days of attempts to arrange a meeting with the top Chetnik leadership, representatives of the Partisan Supreme Headquarters managed to secure a meeting attended by Josip Broz Tito and Draža Mihailović. The meeting was held in Brajići, near Ravna Gora, on 26 October 1941. The basis for negotiations was a letter with 12 points that Tito sent to Mihailović on 20 October 1941, proposing the conclusion of an agreement and joint cooperation. The meeting resulted in a partial agreement that in principle guaranteed the maintenance of the status quo in mutual relations and suggested avoiding conflicts, while the Partisan side committed itself to making certain deliveries to the Chetnik side (1,200 rifles, ammunition, and some financial resources).

The Partisan side adhered to the provisions of the agreement and, in the last days of October, delivered 500 rifles and 24,000 rounds of ammunition to the Chetnik staff at Ravna Gora, as well as about 5 tons of grain to the Požega Chetniks. The commander of the siege of Kraljevo, Major Radoslav Đurić, testified at Draža Mihailović’s 1946 trial that the Chetniks of Vučko Ignjatović in Požega, during the final days of the siege of Kraljevo in late October 1941, were seizing weapons and ammunition that were being transported from Užice to the front near Kraljevo.

=== Mihailović's offer to the Germans ===
At the end of October 1941, Mihailović was informed that the Germans would launch a major offensive and that this was the best way for his "communist rival to be crushed."

According to the testimony of Branislav Pantić, Draža Mihailović held a meeting on 27 October 1941, one day after the conference with Partisan representatives in Brajići, with his closest associates at the house of Major Aleksandar Mišić in Struganik. Besides Mihailović and Mišić, the meeting was attended by Dragiša Vasić, Lieutenant Colonel Dragoslav Pavlović, Colonel Branislav Pantić, and Captain Nenad Mitrović. Speaking about the internal situation and the state of the Chetnik movement, Mihailović emphasized that the Chetnik units lacked sufficient weapons and ammunition, unlike the Partisans, who were becoming stronger every day. Therefore, Mihailović announced that he had decided to turn to the Germans for help and offer them his detachments for use in the fight against the Partisans, provided that the Germans arm and supply them with ammunition. He concluded by stressing that this was the only way to suppress the growth and mass expansion of the Partisan forces, or even to destroy them. Some participants of the meeting believed that, at least for a time, one should not turn to the Germans but instead seek weapons and ammunition from Milan Nedić. Mihailović and Mišić opposed this. Branislav Pantić remembered the following words of Mihailović:

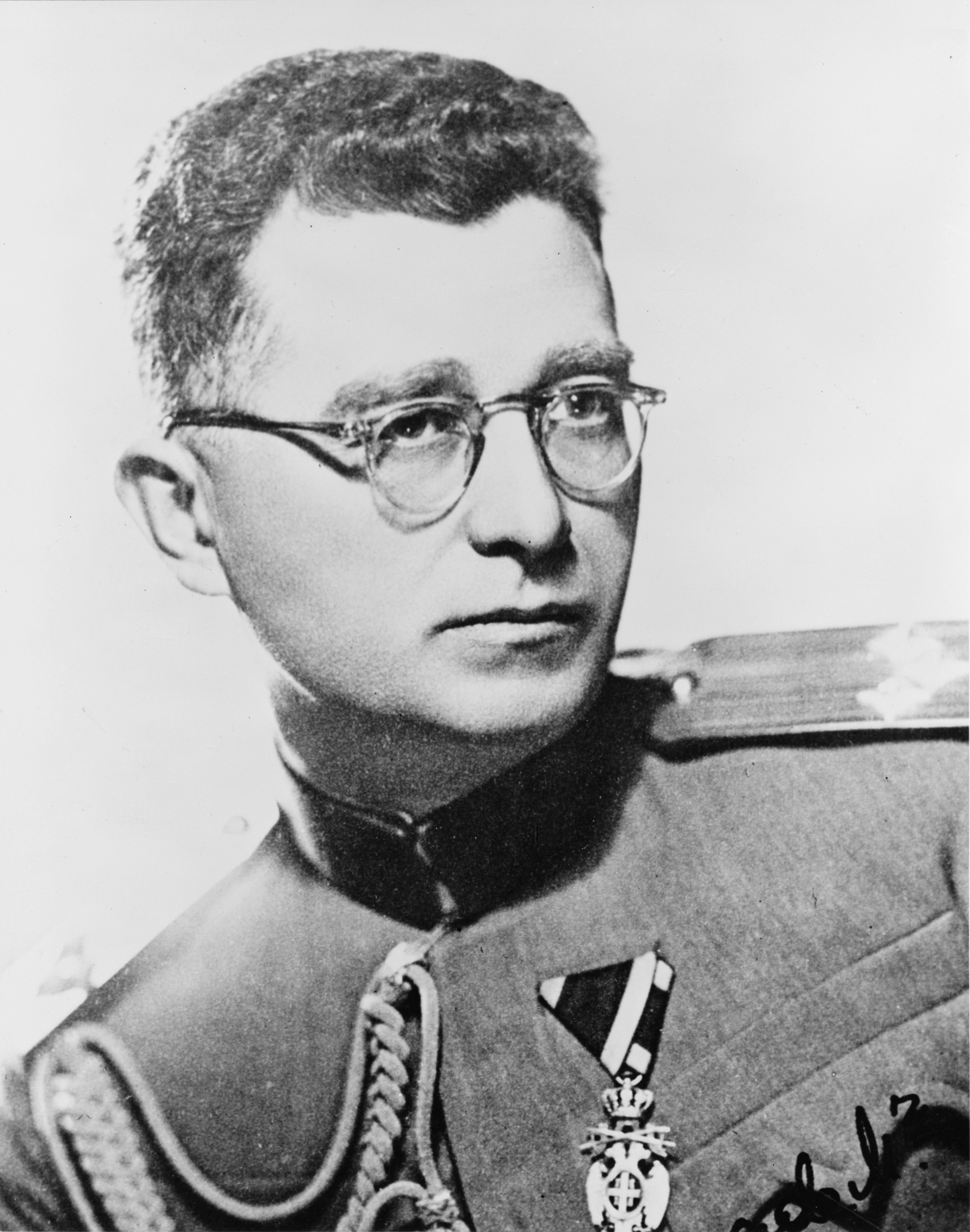
Chetnik leader, Colonel Dragoljub Mihailović

The technical arrangements of Draža Mihailović’s negotiations with the Germans were entrusted to Colonel Pantić and Captain Mitrović. The next day, 28 October 1941, they went to Belgrade, where they met with German Captain Josef Matl. At the meeting with Matl, Mihailović’s offer for cooperation with the German occupiers in order to suppress the Partisan movement was presented. “The general aim is to establish a state of peace and order as they were in occupied Serbia before 28 June 1941.” On 30 October 1941, representatives of the German occupation forces invited Mihailović to a meeting in Belgrade for negotiations, with guarantees of his personal safety.

According to historian Žarko Jovanović, “in order to prove to the Germans that he was indeed a bitter opponent of the communists, that is, of the Partisan movement, and to create more favorable conditions for negotiations, Mihailović ordered his detachments to launch an attack on the Partisans.” Because of the outbreak of open conflicts between the Chetniks and the Partisans at the beginning of November, Mihailović, as he stated in his reply to the German military representatives in Serbia on 3 November 1941, was prevented from personally coming to Belgrade. This resulted in Mihailović’s somewhat later meeting with the representatives of the German occupation forces, on 11 November 1941 in Divci.

=== Execution of Milan Blagojević ===
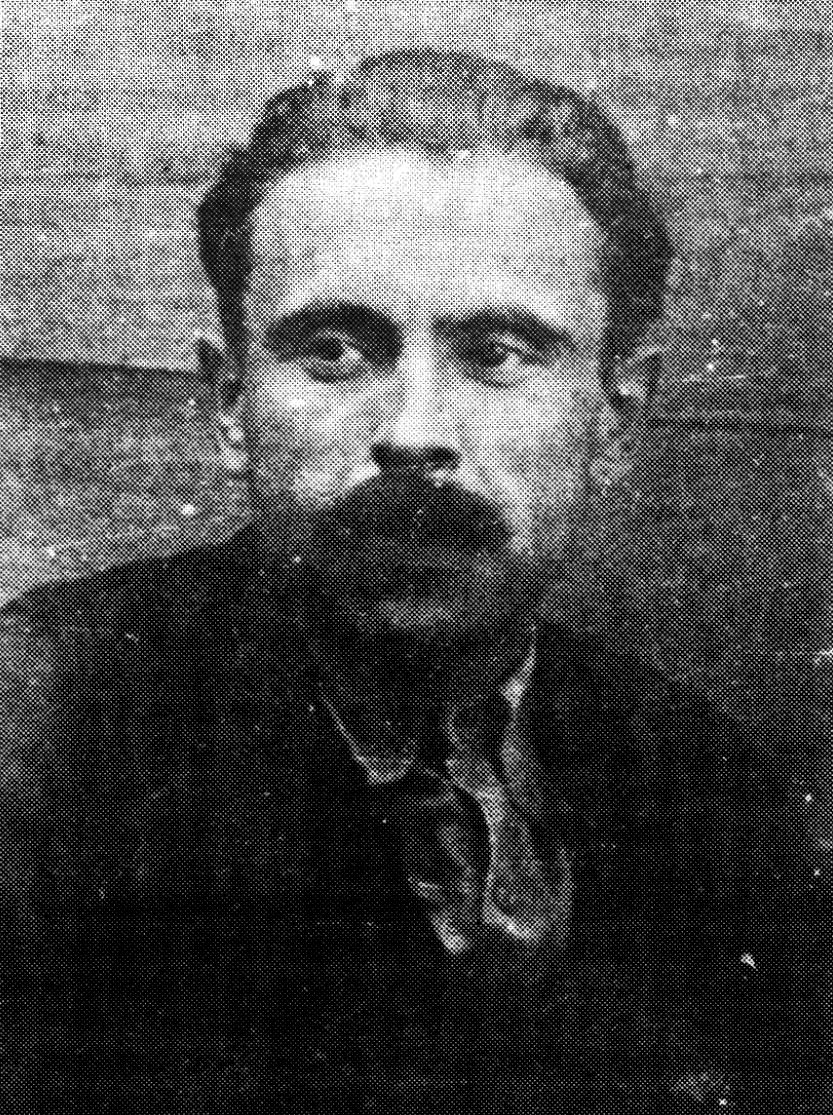
Milan Blagojević Španac, Partisan commander killed on the eve of the attack on Užice.

On the eve of the planned attack on Užice, the Chetniks of Captain Vučko Ignjatović treacherously murdered Milan Blagojević, a Spanish fighter and commander of the First Šumadija Partisan Detachment. On the night of 28 October–29 October 1941, while returning from Užice to Šumadija, Požega Chetniks forcibly pulled him from a train at the railway station in Požega, captured him, and after three days of torture killed him in the village of Glumač.

=== Mihailović's declaration of intent ===
Colonel Mihailović announced his plan to confront the Partisans to all involved actors, including the Yugoslav government, the British mission, and the German command. In a radio dispatch to the President of the Yugoslav government-in-exile, Dušan Simović, dated 28 October 1941, Draža Mihailović announced the imminent attack on Užice, stating his motives:

Mihailović feared further strengthening of the Partisan movement, which would marginalize the Ravnogor Chetnik movement in relation to the Partisans. Therefore, in the dispatch, he emphasized the necessity of seizing the two largest towns in the liberated territory, particularly Užice, due to the arms factory located there. According to post-war testimony of Captain Bill Hudson (Duane Hudson), the first head of the British military mission to the Chetnik Supreme Command, just before the Chetnik attack on Partisan territory began, Mihailović warned him that this was exclusively an internal matter:

This attack on the Partisans that I will carry out and my relations with them are exclusively a Yugoslav matter, and I am the legitimate representative of my government.

— Draža Mihailović in a message to the British mission

Additionally, on 1 November 1941, Draža Mihailović sent a letter to General Hinhofer, commander of the 342nd German Division in Valjevo, informing him that the Chetnik organization was capable of destroying the Partisans and "maintaining order" in western Serbia, but only if it received "sufficient armament":

The Communist threat will cease from the moment the Chetnik organization is given the opportunity to operate freely. [...] The condition is: sufficient weaponry, which is lacking. [...] The region of western Serbia has no military significance for German units and should be a free zone, in which the Chetniks maintain order, provided they are not obstructed and are sufficiently armed.

— Draža Mihailović in a message to the Germans

In the letter to the German commander, Colonel Mihailović emphasized that "Chetnik action is not directed against German units, as long as they do not attack the Chetniks and the people." Historian Venceslav Glišić notes that Draža Mihailović decided to attack Partisan units in the center of the liberated territory encouraged by the establishment of links with the British and Yugoslav governments, which promised him support, and by ongoing negotiations with the German command in Belgrade.

== First Chetnik attack on Užice ==
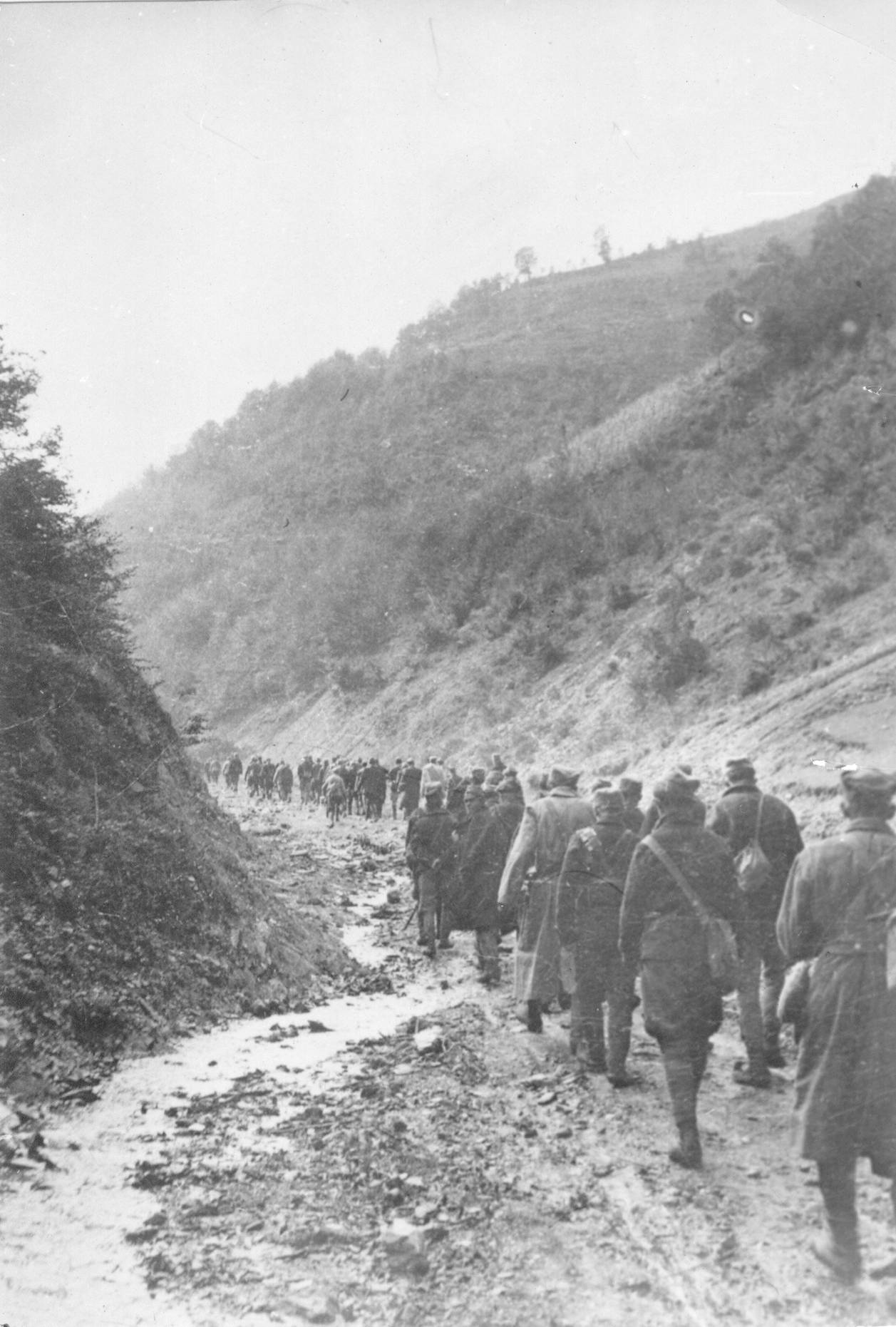
Fighters of the Takovo Battalion of the Čačak Partisan Detachment on the way to Užice, October 1941.

Until the attack on Užice, Mihailović's Chetniks moved freely in the liberated territory without any interference, except when looting villages. Thanks to the mandatory mobilization carried out in the liberated territory, the Chetnik detachments had grown significantly. By the end of October, a concentration of Chetnik forces around Užice was noted. The Zlatibor–Užice Chetnik Detachment moved from the Višegrad area to Užice, from where, on 31 October 1941, it moved to Požega and joined the main Chetnik forces. By the end of October, larger numbers of Chetnik groups were present in the Užice, Požega, and Ivanjica areas, although sharp clashes with German forces were occurring in the border areas.

The Partisan Supreme Staff had reliable intelligence that the Chetniks were planning an attack on Užice. Since the majority of the fighters of the Užice Partisan Detachment were engaged in intense battles with German forces on the front, the Supreme Staff placed certain units, which had arrived in Užice in the last days of October to receive weapons and ammunition, under the command of the Užice Detachment: the Dragačevo Battalion of the Čačak Detachment, the Mining Company of the Kopaonik Detachment. Additionally, the 2nd Užice and 2nd Požega companies of the Užice Detachment, under Dušan Jerković, the detachment commander, were ordered to leave their positions toward Valjevo and move to Karan (a village between Užice and Kosjerić).

=== Battles on the approaches ===
Armed clashes began on the evening of 31 October when Chetniks from Karan and Ribaševina encountered fighters of the Dragačevo Battalion of the Čačak NOP Detachment in Trnava near Užice, who had been pulled from the front toward the Užice area. According to the Partisan version, the Chetniks attacked the Dragačevo Battalion company and forced it to retreat. According to the Chetnik version, the Partisans attacked them. In any case, the Karan and Ribaševina Chetniks initially succeeded in pushing the Partisans out of Trnava, but by the morning of 1 November, they were defeated due to reinforcements from the Užice NOP Detachment.

On 1 November, partisan agitators managed to convince mobilized villagers in the areas of Zlatibor, Kremna, and Bioska that Chetnik leaders were planning an attack on Užice, after which most of the mobilized villagers returned home. In the village of Bioska, the Partisans disarmed the local Chetnik detachment. Additionally, in Užice, personnel of the local Chetnik command were arrested, and 20 Chetniks belonging to the town guard were disarmed. In this way, some Chetnik groups in the Užice area were neutralized before the main attack.

At the same time, on 1 November, the attack leader Captain Vučko Ignjatović, commander of the Požega Chetnik Detachment, ordered various Chetnik detachments in the Užice area to attack the Partisans. In the order to the Ribaševina Chetnik Detachment for the attack on Karan, he stated that "the Partisans are abandoning positions everywhere" and therefore the Chetniks "must prevent them from doing so at all costs". Simultaneously, he ordered the commander of the Dobrodolaka Company to disarm and arrest Partisans, and instructed Lieutenant Tankosić to take control of Trešnjica, after which "the entire detachment will move tonight in three columns toward Užice".

In the order to the Požega Detachment for the attack on Užice, Vučko Ignjatović explained that the Partisans, "under the guise of fighting the occupier, sought to secretly implement their political principles," that in Užice they "arrested our people in masses and at night led them out of prison never to appear again," and that they had first engaged openly against the Chetniks ("last night they attacked our detachments in Karan and Ribaševina"). Since "they cannot stand to see Serbian lives disappear one by one in the struggle for political power that a few people want to seize," the Chetniks would enter Užice to protect the people. In Ignjatović’s order of 1 November 1941 for the attack on Užice, it was instructed: "In action, be decisive, brave, and energetic as befits Serbian Chetniks," followed by: "In night battles, it is best to eliminate everything suddenly and without noise."

=== Battle of Trešnjica ===
The grouping of Vučko Ignjatović was the largest and best-organized Chetnik formation participating in the attack on Užice, and it was assigned the main strike. It was assembled in Požega and numbered around 1,000 men. In this group, in addition to mobilized villagers who were unaware of the true intentions of their officers (some were told they were going on a military parade in Užice, others to positions near Višegrad), gendarmes, non-commissioned officers, and officers were more heavily represented compared to other Chetnik detachments. Ignjatović divided his troops into three columns. The right column advanced from the village of Zdravčići via Trešnjica Hill (a height dominating the town), the central column (commanded by Major Manojlo Korać, consisting of the bulk of the Požega Chetniks) advanced from the village of Visibaba along the southern part of Trešnjica toward Sevojno and Užice, and the left column advanced from Visibaba along the Đetinja valley toward Sevojno and Užice.

On the night of 1–2 November, the Chetniks advanced toward Užice. Upon encountering Partisan positions on Trešnjevica and Čakarevo Hills, held by fighters of the 1st and 4th companies of the Užice Detachment and a small number from the 6th Ibar Company of the Kopaonik Detachment, clashes occurred. At these positions east of Užice, only a small number of Partisan fighters (around 200) were present. However, part of the Požega Chetnik group was forced to advance toward Karan via the Lužnica valley, while another part attempted to advance toward the southern approaches to the town from the villages of Drežnik and Zbojištica, where a Partisan defense had also been established. As a result, the main Chetnik attack on Trešnjica Hill did not achieve the expected success. The Partisans also had the advantage of higher ground, well-fortified with cover, including trenches. Soon, Partisan reinforcements from Užice (elements of the Dragačevo Battalion of the Čačak Detachment and the Račanska Company of the Užice Detachment) arrived at the Trešnjica positions, commanded by Lieutenant Radivoje Jovanović Bradonja. The position between Užice and Sevojno, on Menda Hill, was successfully defended by fighters of the Railway Company of the Užice NOP Detachment and armed workers from Užice factories.

In the battle of Trešnjica, on 2 November 1941, the Požega Chetniks were defeated, while on other approaches to Užice, they did not advance further than Sevojno and Zabučje, which forced them, after a ten-hour battle, to withdraw the same day to positions toward Požega.

== Chetnik attack on Ivanjica ==
=== Partisan–Chetnik agreement ===
In the Ivanjica area, partisans coexisted with Draža Mihailović's Chetniks, while with the Chetniks led by Boža Javorski, a representative of vojvoda Kosta Pećanac in the Ivanjica region, they had been in open conflict since the summer of 1941. On 1 November 1941, representatives of the Arilje Battalion of the Užice Partisan Detachment signed an agreement with the Ivanjica Chetniks of Draža Mihailović (Morava Chetnik Detachment) to resolve the issue of Boža Javorski. It was guaranteed that Boža Javorski would be subordinated to the Chetnik detachments of the Yugoslav Army under Draža Mihailović's command:

The agreement was preceded by the arrival of Chetnik Captain Milorad Mitić, envoy of the Chetnik Supreme Command, who convinced local Partisans of the Ravnagors’ desire for cooperation. The agreement stipulated that in liberated Ivanjica, Partisan and Chetnik commands would coexist on equal terms with a minimal number of armed fighters, and that each individual could freely choose which units to join.

=== Surprise Chetnik attack ===
On the same day the agreement was signed, partisans in Ivanjica and surrounding areas were jointly attacked by the Morava Detachment Chetniks and Boža Javorski’s detachment. It is considered that the agreement was only a pretext to facilitate the attack on the Partisans, given the role of the Morava Chetniks in the overall Chetnik attack on Užice. By attacking the Partisans in Ivanjica, the Morava Chetniks aimed to tie down some Partisan forces so that the Chetnik main force attacking Užice would face minimal resistance.

The attack occurred in the early morning hours of 2 November 1941. Although surprised, the Partisans in Ivanjica quickly organized and resisted. After half a day of pressure, the Partisans managed to launch a counterattack and forced the Chetniks to retreat. According to Partisan sources, 14 Partisan fighters were killed, including Stevan Čolović, political commissar of the Arilje Battalion. According to the same sources, about 30 Chetniks were killed in the attack on Ivanjica.

== Partisan counterattack ==
After their defeat in the attack on Užice, the Chetniks occupied positions near Požega, determined at all costs to prevent the Partisans from taking the town and Chetnik strongholds in surrounding villages. The Požega area was important to the Chetniks not only because of its strategic position, cutting the communication route between Užice and Čačak under Partisan control, but also because of the airfield at Tatojevica, as they expected military assistance from the British.

Following the battle at Trešnjica, Radivoje Jovanović Bradonja and the commander of the Užice NOP Detachment Dušan Jerković went to Užice on 2 November to report the outcome to Tito. At the meeting, it was decided that it was necessary to capture Požega to prevent further Chetnik concentration and a new attack on Užice. A detailed plan for the attack on Požega was prepared the next day in Zdravčići, a village 5 km from Požega, from where the main Partisan forces advanced. The importance the Supreme Headquarters placed on capturing Požega is confirmed by the fact that two members, Sreten Žujović and Ivo Lola Ribar, were sent to this sector.

=== Partisan capture of Požega ===
Partisan forces advanced on Požega in three attack groups: 1) right wing, from Arilje and Gorobilje, tasked with cutting the Požega–Čačak road in case of Chetnik withdrawal from the town; 2) central wing, from Užice and Rasna, on both sides of the Užice–Požega road up to the Požega–Arilje road; 3) left wing, from Zdravčići toward Glumče, a village on the Požega–Kosjerić road controlled by Chetniks, aiming to encircle Požega from the north. The Partisan units advancing from Arilje were unable to participate due to the earlier Chetnik attack on Ivanjica.

After the left and right wings approached the town, the central column crossed the swollen Skrapež River, separating them from Chetnik positions in Požega, and launched an assault on the town. The Partisan assault forced the Chetniks to retreat toward Glumče and Prijanovići. Casualties were significant. According to Partisan sources, around 30 Partisan fighters were killed in the battle for Požega, including Bogdan Kapelan, commander of the Dragačevo Battalion Čačanski NOP Detachment (posthumously awarded National Hero) and Miladin Popović, commander of the Požega–Užice company Užički NOP Detachment. Among the many wounded was Sreten Žujović.

=== Ceasefire and Chetnik ultimatum ===
After the Partisans entered Požega, Chetnik Captain Milorad Mitić, liaison officer of the Chetnik Supreme Command to the Partisan Supreme Headquarters, who had previously been in Užice, requested negotiations on behalf of Draža Mihailović. On 3 November 1941, he was sent to Užice together with Major Zaharije Ostojić. Tito accepted the ceasefire proposal. It was agreed that the ceasefire would begin at 17:00 the same day. The Partisan proposal included forming a joint Partisan–Chetnik commission to investigate the events of the previous days and identify those responsible for the outbreak of armed conflict.

The Supreme Headquarters ordered Partisan units to cease fire, and two Chetnik officers were released. In Požega, a driver, Ljubivoje Kovačević, was assigned to take them to Chetnik positions in the village of Dobrinja, where he was captured and later handed over to the Germans, imprisoned at Banjica in Belgrade, and eventually transferred to Mauthausen, where he died in 1943.

In the evening of the same day, the Chetnik Supreme Command issued an ultimatum to the Partisans to leave Požega by midnight, otherwise the Chetniks would resume armed conflict. The ultimatum was rejected.

On 3 November, Draža Mihailović sent a letter to the German commander of Serbia, General Franz Böhme, stating that he was willing to respond to the call for negotiations and personally travel to Belgrade, but was currently unable due to fighting with the Partisans:

Considering the actual situation in the country, characterized for several days by large-scale battles that my units are conducting against communist elements and which are likely turning into a general conflict, it is necessary for me at this moment to remain in place until the situation is resolved. These battles are taking place in the Užice–Požega–Kosjerić–Ivanjica area. In view of the above, it is necessary that your units take no action in this area. I will notify the exact day of my arrival in Belgrade through my negotiator.

== Chetnik attack on Čačak ==
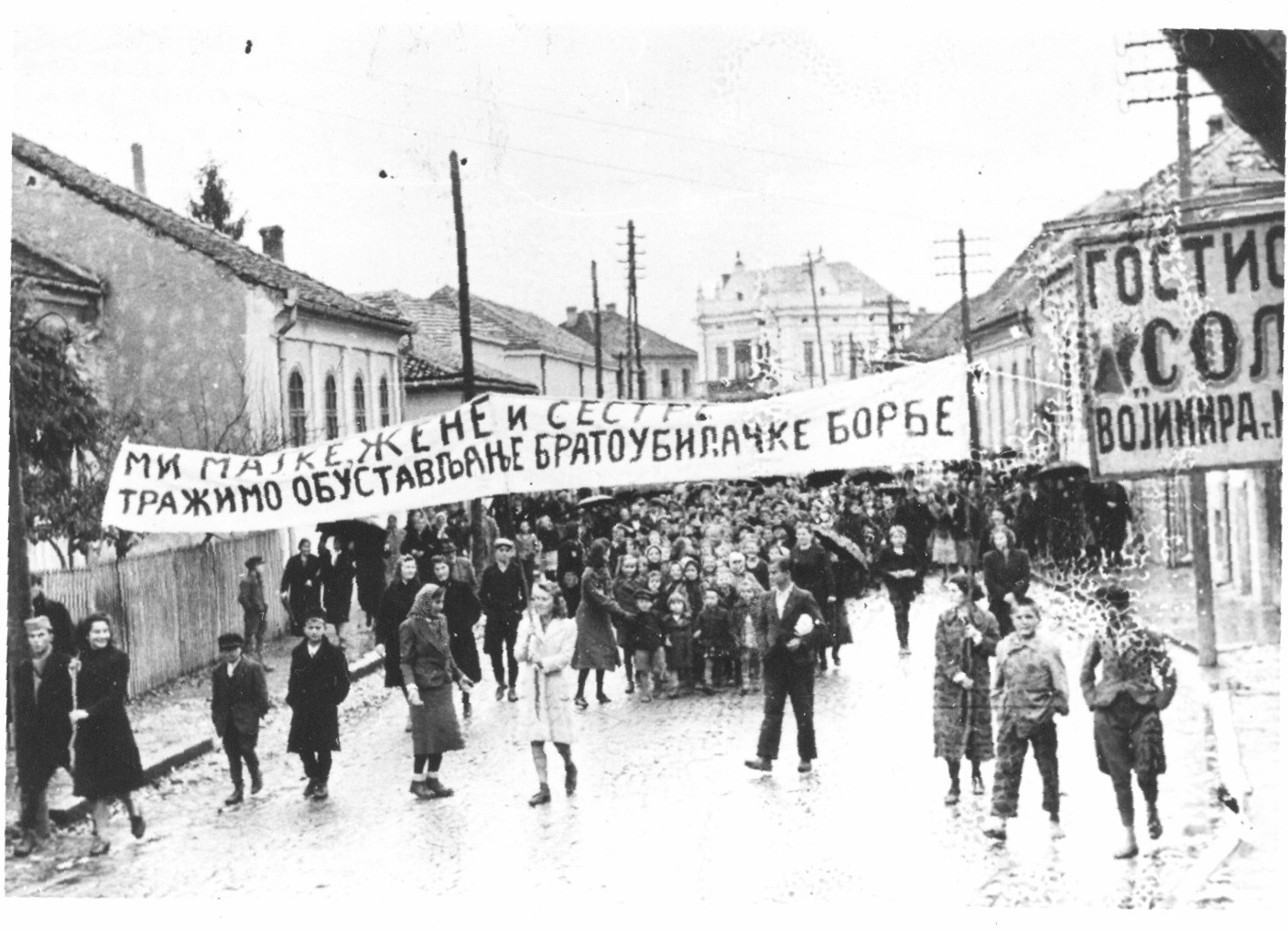
Protest against fratricidal killings, Čačak, November 1941.

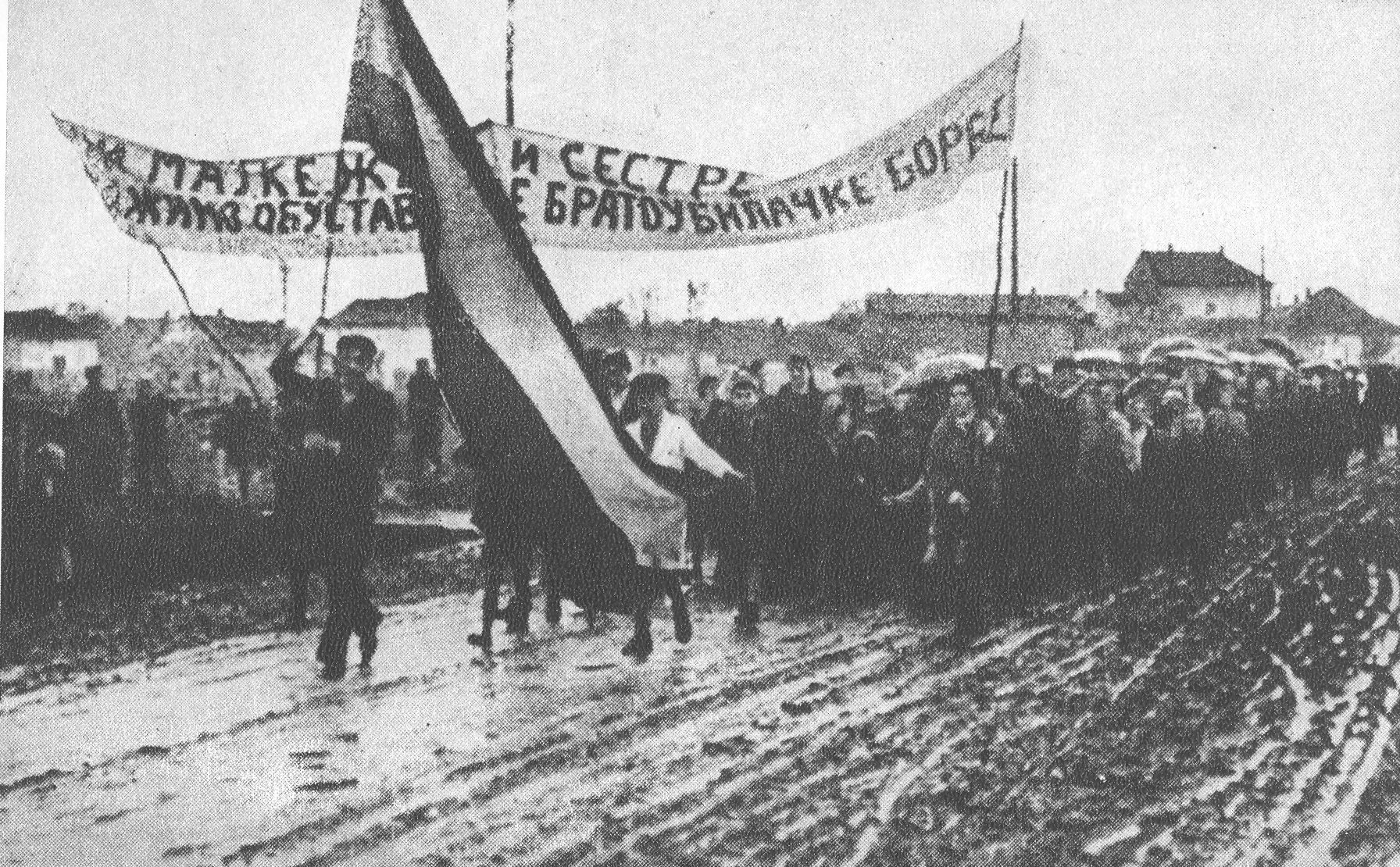
After the Chetnik attack, citizens of Čačak protest carrying a banner reading: "We, mothers, wives and sisters, demand an end to fratricidal fighting." According to Vladimir Dedijer’s diary, the Chetniks fired on the column.

=== Refusal to carry out orders ===
The Chetnik attack on the Partisans in Čačak was planned to coincide with Chetnik units attacking Užice. On the night of 1–2 November, Colonel Dragoljub Mihailović ordered Major Radoslav Đurić, commander of Chetnik forces at the siege of Kraljevo, to "immediately, under cover of darkness, leave the position facing the Germans and attack Partisan positions in Čačak and the surrounding area." The goal was:

Seize Čačak and secure it from the Užice direction. Disarm the Partisan command and send it to Ravna Gora.

At the time, Chetniks and Partisans were jointly fighting the Germans on the Kraljevo front. Most Chetnik fighters, including Đurić personally, opposed Mihailović’s order. Major Đurić did not carry it out, but informed the comrades of the Čačak Partisan Detachment. At the postwar trial of Draža Mihailović, Major Đurić explained why he could not follow the order:

It could not be carried out while we were engaged in a major battle with the occupiers, with joint columns, ambulances, doctors, and mixed units. It was impossible to allow one side to be attacked during a fight against the occupiers, as fighters on both sides supported cooperation.

The Čačak Partisan Detachment immediately informed the Supreme Headquarters of the NOVJ, after which it was decided that Major Đurić should personally intervene with Colonel Mihailović to withdraw the order. Mihailović maintained his decision to attack Čačak.

On 3 November 1941, Mihailović issued a new order to attack the Partisans in Čačak. Chetnik commander Bogdan Marjanović asked Lieutenant Uroš Katanić to attack Čačak during the night of 3 November, but he replied that his men were exhausted. The next day, 4 November, Lieutenant Katanić refused three further orders to lead his men in an attack on Čačak alongside Captain Marjanović. Finally, Colonel Mihailović assigned the attack on Čačak to Captain Jovan Deroko, artillery commander and chief of staff of Chetnik forces on the Kraljevo front.

=== Partisan takeover of the town ===
The Supreme Headquarters of NOVJ announced on 4 November that Draža Mihailović and his staff "withdrew their troops from the siege of Kraljevo and directed them against the Partisans," and ordered Partisan units to clear the area of Chetniks. Two battalions of the Čačak Partisan Detachment were also withdrawn from the Kraljevo front.

Chetnik forces, retreating from the Kraljevo front, attacked Partisan positions in villages between Kraljevo and Čačak. On 4 November, near the village of Samaila, they attacked a Partisan tank unit, seized a tank, and killed the commander Srećko Nikolić. The same day, they attacked the Partisan artillery crew near Mrčajevci, seizing the guns. Simultaneously, the Trnava Battalion of the Čačak Partisan Detachment, also withdrawn from the Kraljevo front, clashed with Chetnik outposts near Čačak. Partisan leaders declared Chetnik commander Bogdan Marjanović the main culprit and sentenced him to death in absentia. In Čačak, the Partisans disarmed the Chetniks and assumed control (previously there had been a joint town command).

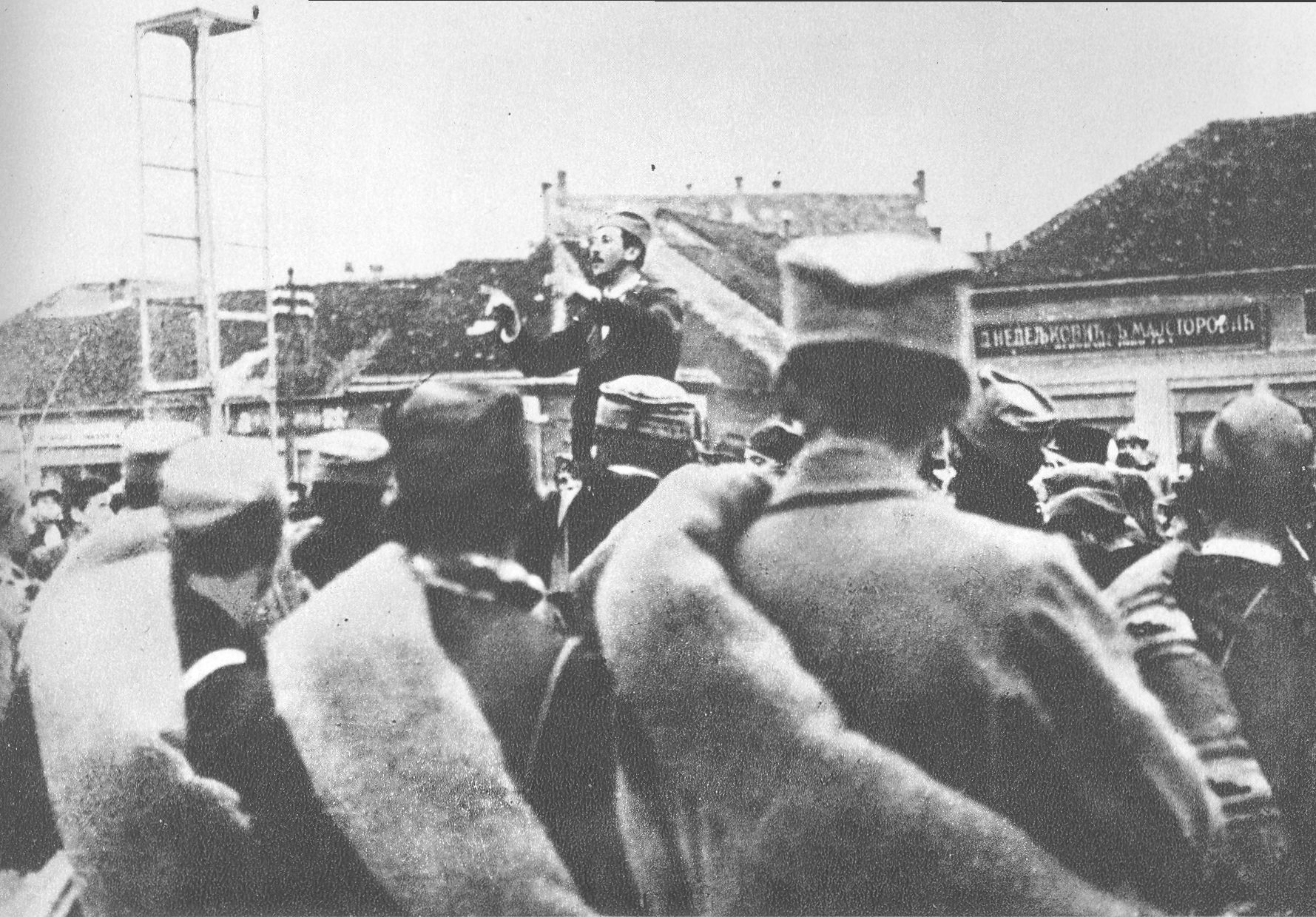
Political commissar of the Čačak Detachment, Ratko Mitrović, addresses fighters in Čačak.

Chetnik sources claim that on 4 November, the Partisans disarmed a detachment of 100 Chetniks, killing some, and took control of the town. On the same day, the Partisans arrested Chetnik families and seven officers who remained in the town. Partisan sources state that these arrests, involving around ten Chetnik officers and their families, were a response to the detention of Momčilo Radosavljević, commander of the Čačak Partisan Detachment, who on 5 November went to the Chetnik staff on the outskirts of Čačak to negotiate a de-escalation. On 6 November 1941, Chetnik commander Radoslav Đurić wrote to Čačak Partisan political commissar Ratko Mitrović:

On 4 November, abusing the trust of the Chetniks, the Partisans in Čačak disarmed a detachment of 100 Chetniks, during which several of our men were killed, and seized Čačak. On the same day, Partisan units opened machine-gun fire on a Chetnik detachment attempting to enter Čačak, during which one officer and several soldiers were seriously wounded. On the same day, the Partisans arrested all Chetnik families in Čačak and seven officers who remained in the town.

In a report to Draža Mihailović on 6 November 1941, Chetnik commander Bogdan Marjanović also described the mutual arrests in Čačak:

In the town of Čačak, the Partisans again arrested prominent traders and officers who failed to escape. Their main commander, known as "Molo," along with Vuk Stojić and Đurakić, commissars and shady figures, as well as many of their leaders, were arrested. Therefore, last night they arrested all officer families in the town.

=== Chetnik ultimatum ===
On the morning of 6 November 1941, a new order from Draža Mihailović arrived for an attack on Čačak, which would be led by Jovan V. Deroko with artillery support:

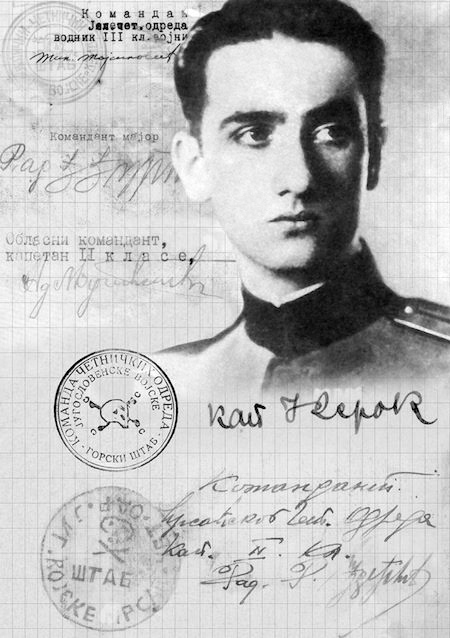
Captain Jovan V. Deroko, leader of the Chetnik attack on Čačak.

“Take up positions as soon as possible to take control of Čačak and pass the necessary instructions to Captain Deroko. Captain Deroko should, with 2/3 of his men and the artillery, using carts taken from positions near Kraljevo, immediately seize Čačak. With the remaining 1/3 he should secure the route towards Raška and the Kraljevo–Čačak route, engaging in the most persistent defense on those routes. Very urgent.”

The partisans in Čačak were willing to make some concessions to the Chetniks, hoping to negotiate. The commander of the Čačak Chetnik units, Bogdan Marjanović, interpreted this as a sign of weakness, concluding that the “partisans were decapitated” and frightened, so he “rejected all of it, setting demands that I was sure they would not accept, because that would mean their capitulation and surrender of arms.” On 6 November, Radoslav Đurić forwarded an ultimatum to Ratko Mitrović, which, among other things, demanded:

1. The reorganization of partisan units, which so far were based on political grounds, into existing military-Chetnik units under the command of Colonel Draža Mihailović, who has been appointed by the decree of His Majesty the King.

3. The abolition of the people's liberation committees.
4. Since our state is a monarchy, everyone must recognize His Majesty the King and fight for him and the fatherland against the occupiers.
6. Entry into the military ranks is with the rank one held in the army.

9. Deadline for response by 16:00 today.

Major Đurić made every effort to convince the partisans to accept the imposed conditions. On the same day, he sent a letter to the partisan commander Momčilo Radosavljević explaining that the partisans would bear responsibility for fratricidal war and setting a deadline of 18:30:

We are all subjects of the Kingdom of Yugoslavia and of King Peter II. In our state, there can be only one army, gathered around those parts of the army that did not surrender to the occupier... You are all aware of the given oath. [...] Therefore, the responsibility for fratricidal hostilities will fall on those individuals who want to divide people and create a new army that is not recognized by our laws. [...] Based on all the above, the only way to stop hostilities is to fully accept the imposed conditions, which are in the interest of our people, and their refusal is a deliberate act of pushing the people into a fratricidal war. This clearly shows on whom the responsibility and curse for prolonging hostilities fall.

== Chetnik attack on Gornji Milanovac ==
=== Giving the "honorable word" ===
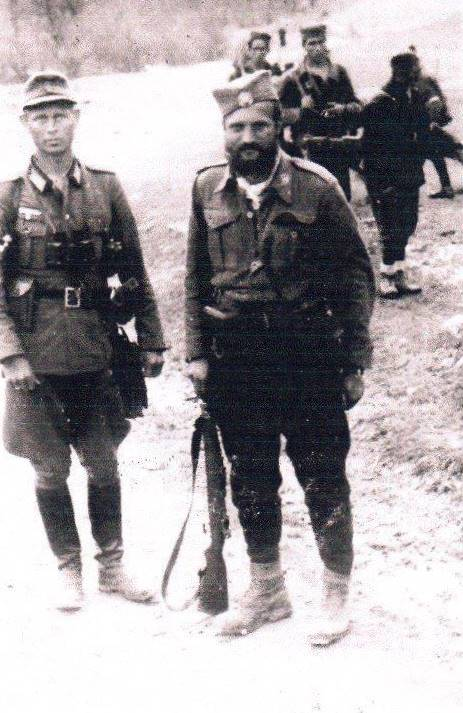
Zvonimir Zvonko Vučković, leader of the attack on partisans in G. Milanovac, later an open collaborator with the Germans.

On 4 November 1941 at 16:00, Lieutenant Zvonimir Vučković was attending a meeting regarding the defense of Gornji Milanovac with partisan commander Branko Rakić, when he received a phone call from the Chief of the Mountain Staff, Lieutenant Colonel Dragoslav Pavlović, ordering him to immediately attack the partisans and disarm them. The local Chetnik commanders then decided that Vučković should personally go to the Supreme Command in Brajići to inform Lieutenant Colonel Pavlović that his order could not be carried out at the moment, as the soldiers had not yet developed the necessary disposition, and that in recent days in Milanovac they had managed to establish relatively good relations with the partisans. Lieutenant Colonel Pavlović rejected these reasons and ordered immediate compliance with the issued order.

Meanwhile, the partisans suspected that something was being planned. Part of the Chetniks left the town, while another part was disarmed by fighters of the Takovo Battalion of the Čačak NOP detachment in Gornji Milanovac. Upon returning to Milanovac, Vučković found the Chetniks in the village of Brusnica near Milanovac preparing for an attack. Lieutenant Vučković then returned to Milanovac to convince the partisans that their alliance would not be violated. Together with partisan commander Branko Rakić, he agreed, giving his honorable officer's word, that the weapons would be returned to the disarmed Chetniks, and that the remaining Chetniks could immediately return to Milanovac.

On 4 November 1941 at 16:00, when I was attending a meeting regarding the defense of Milanovac with the communist battalion commander Rakić, I was called on the phone from Brajići by the Chief of the Mountain Staff, Lieutenant Colonel Pavlović, who briefly ordered me to immediately attack the communists and disarm them. Captain Reljić, commander of the town, and Captain Stojanović, commander of the detachment who had arrived in Milanovac, decided that I should go to Brajići personally and inform Lieutenant Colonel Pavlović that his order could not be carried out at the moment, as the necessary disposition had not been created among the soldiers, since we had just managed to establish relatively good relations in Milanovac. Lieutenant Colonel Pavlović rejected my reasons and ordered immediate compliance with the issued order. (...) All this cost me my honorable word that I would not attack the communists, which Rakić asked of me as a guarantee. The very next day, together with Stojanović, I decided to attack the communists, but I temporarily withdrew in order to uphold the honorable word in which the communists firmly believed.

— Lieutenant Zvonimir Vučković, commander of the Takovo Chetnik detachment

Immediately before the attack on partisans in G. Milanovac, Chetnik Captain Radovan Stojanović also assured the partisans that he did not want a conflict, although he would lead the attack that followed. The Takovo partisans allowed Chetnik forces to remain in the town thanks to these assurances and the "honorable officer's word" of Stojanović and Vučković. All this occurred simultaneously with the Chetnik attack on partisans in the Čačak region.

=== Attack on partisans in the hospital ===
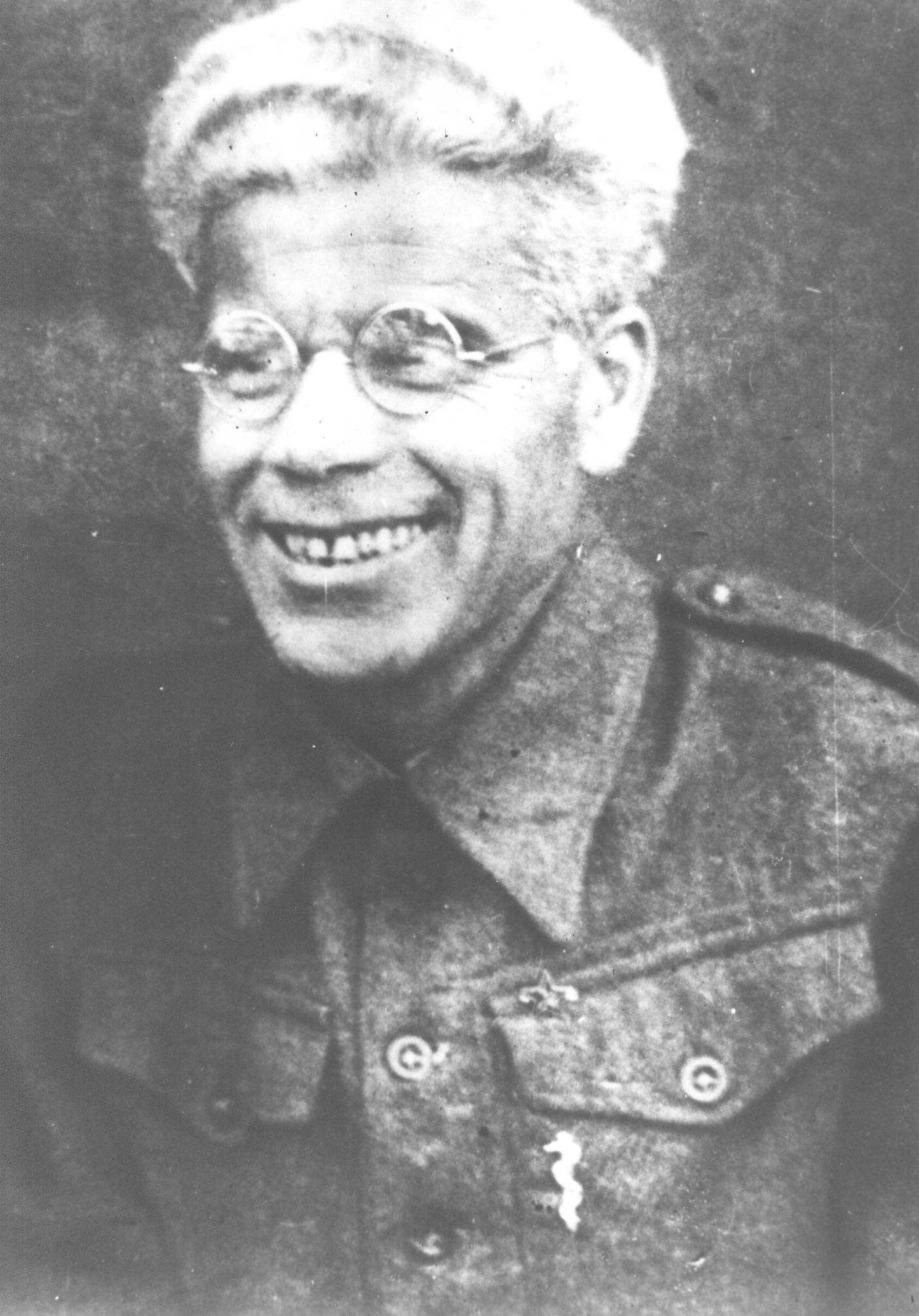
Dr Dionizije Đorović, head of the partisan hospital in Savinac near Gornji Milanovac. The Chetniks captured him and handed him over to the Germans, who sent him to a camp in Norway.

On the night of 6–7 November, the Chetniks suddenly attacked the partisans in Gornji Milanovac. The main partisan forces were stationed in two buildings. The Takovo Battalion was in the Health Center, while the First Šumadija Partisan Detachment was in the hospital. During the night, Chetniks under Vučković, led by Sergeant Kljajić, suddenly surrounded the hospital and attacked the partisans. After a brief fight, Sergeant Kljajić spent six full hours attempting to convince the surrounded partisans to surrender. The partisans in the hospital (about 125 fighters) surrendered after being guaranteed safety.

However, on the night of 7–8 November 1941, at 2 a.m., they carried out a treacherous attack on us. I was on the first floor of the hospital. They shouted wildly and fired machine guns. They caught some of our comrades while they were sleeping. We held out from 2 a.m. until the afternoon when we ran out of ammunition. They then offered to negotiate our surrender. We were against surrender, but since there were about 50–60 civilians from Gornji Milanovac on the first floor of the hospital, including children and women, and they threatened that if we did not negotiate and surrender, they would burn down the hospital, which we could not allow...

— Ninko Sakić, commander of the Second Battalion of the First Šumadija Partisan Detachment, one of the partisans captured in the hospital in Gornji Milanovac

At the same time, Radovan Stojanović's Chetnik detachment attacked the Health Center. Most partisans stationed in the Health Center managed to break out of the town and avoid capture. Ten from this group were captured. According to Chetnik sources, around 135 partisans were captured in Gornji Milanovac on 8 November 1941. The partisans captured in the town, along with fighters captured in surrounding villages, were taken on 8 November to Mihailović’s headquarters at Ravna Gora, after which the captured partisans were handed over to the Germans. The Germans executed most of the captured, while only a few managed to escape.

Simultaneously with the Chetnik attack on partisans in G. Milanovac, the Chetnik staff prepared an attack on Guča, which was abandoned because the Chetnik Guča company refused to participate in the attack. Later, the Chetniks attacked partisans in Guča on 19 November.

== Second Chetnik attack on Užice ==
The Chetnik Supreme Command at Ravna Gora found itself in a very difficult situation — all attempts to defeat the main partisan forces and capture Užice and Čačak, the largest towns in the liberated territory and key partisan strongholds, had failed. Mihailović's command ordered a new attack on Užice from the northern direction, deploying a Chetnik formation (about 1,500 fighters) under the command of Captain Dragoslav Račić, withdrawn from positions facing the Germans near Valjevo and Krupanj, to engage the main partisan forces.

=== Battle in Karan ===
Račić's Chetniks arrived in Kosjerić on 4 November, from where they advanced toward Karan, a village south of Kosjerić. They reached the Lužnica valley on 4 November, while the main partisan forces were still in Požega, which they had just captured. As Račić prepared for the attack, part of the partisan forces rushed from Požega toward Karan. Before the Chetnik attack on Karan, partisan reinforcements arrived. The Chetniks attacked Karan on the night of 7–8 November. They managed to capture the settlement and take a large number of partisans prisoner, who surrendered believing their lives would be spared.

The captured partisans were first taken to the prison in Kosjerić. The names of 115 captured partisans and supporters of the partisan movement are known; they were transferred from the Chetnik prison in Kosjerić to Ravna Gora on 9 November (just before the partisans captured Kosjerić), and on 13 November were handed over to the Germans.

=== Battle for Metaljka ===
Parts of the Užice Partisan Detachment managed to consolidate on the Metaljka hill, between Karan and Užice. Additionally, on the evening of 7 November, partisan reinforcements arrived from Užice, due to the strategic importance of this position for the town’s defense. Fighters from the Slovene Partisan Company "Ivan Cankar," composed mostly of Slovene refugees concentrated in Užice, also participated in this battle.

The fierce battle for Metaljka took place on 8 November, lasting the entire day, with the position changing hands several times. In the end, the partisans managed to repel the Chetniks toward Karan. The next day, the partisans pushed the Chetniks back toward Kosjerić and later that same day captured the town. The Chetniks retreated toward Ražana, north of Kosjerić, and toward Varda, west of Kosjerić. Ražana was soon captured as well, forcing the main Chetnik forces under Dragoslav Račić to withdraw to Ravna Gora. In these battles, from which the occupiers gained the most, dozens of Chetniks and partisans were killed.

== Other attacks ==
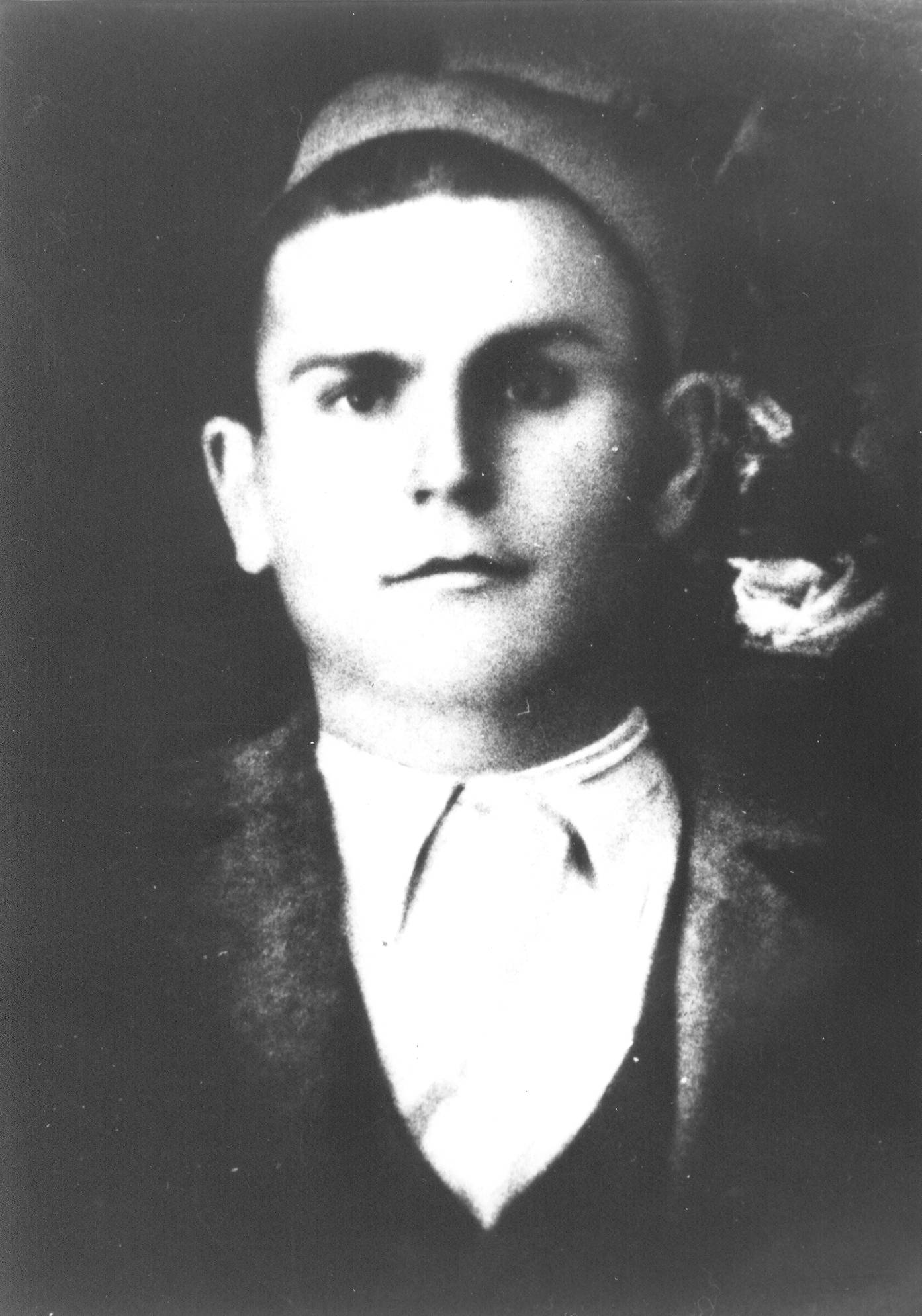
Srećko Nikolić, commander of a Partisan tank platoon; killed by Chetniks in Samaila near Kraljevo on 4 November 1941.

On 7 November 1941, Chetniks under Mihailović and Pećanac jointly attacked Ljig and captured 107 Partisans.

== Mihailović's calls for assistance ==
After repelling the attack, Partisan forces continued pursuing the Chetniks toward Ravna Gora, tightening the encirclement around Draža Mihailović's headquarters. The difficult situation forced Colonel Mihailović to seek help from all possible sources.

=== Appeal to the Yugoslav government ===
On 5 November 1941, Colonel Mihailović presented his version of events to the President of the Yugoslav government, Dušan Simović, insisting that Britain should not send aid to the Partisans:

The communists’ struggle against the Germans is only apparent. They have armed themselves from the factory in Užice. They attacked my troops in Ivanjica, Požega, Arilje, Užice, Gorjevnica, Ražana, Kosjerić, and other places. I have taken up the fight and believe its outcome will be in my favor. [...] If aided by England, I refuse the assistance. [...] Having the arms factory in Užice, from which they gave me nothing, and now you are to provide them with British arms, we are finished forever.

— Telegram from Draža Mihailović to the Yugoslav government-in-exile, 5 November 1941

On 9 November 1941, Mihailović informed General Simović that only urgent British aid could improve the situation:

The situation requires the most urgent assistance, primarily in automatic weapons and ammunition. Aircraft must arrive tonight and each following night. Only the fastest assistance can improve the situation.

— Telegram from Draža Mihailović to the Yugoslav government-in-exile, 9 November 1941

On 10 November 1941, the day before a scheduled meeting with the Germans, Mihailović urged General Simović to enable him to fight the occupiers:

Immediate assistance is needed in ammunition, automatic weapons, and money... Thousands of organized men stand unarmed, waiting for the moment when they will be allowed to engage in combat against the bloodthirsty occupiers.

— Telegram from Draža Mihailović to the Yugoslav government-in-exile, 10 November 1941

=== Appeal to Bosnian Chetniks ===
On 9 November 1941, Draža Mihailović addressed Chetniks from eastern Bosnia under Major Jezdimir Dangić. Mihailović ordered Dangić to transfer all Chetnik units from Bosnia to Serbia for attacks on Užice and Kosjerić ("leave only the absolutely necessary units in Bosnia"), to disarm Partisans along the way, and to arm his own troops:

The situation is such that all our troops from Bosnia should quickly withdraw to Bajina Bašta, disarming all Partisans along the way and arming our men, thereby increasing your units. Once you reach Bajina Bašta, send part of the forces toward Užice and the other toward Kosjerić to attack Partisans, disarm them, and arm our men. Leave only the absolutely necessary units in Bosnia.

He also ordered him to call all Chetnik commanders "on the Višegrad–Sarajevo line and other directions" to join him. Mihailović noted that on the night of 31 October "the Partisans treacherously attacked" his forces, "and with concentrated strength pushed them toward Požega." At the end of the order he wrote:

You should know that at the head of the Partisans are Croatian Ustaše, whose goal is to push our people into fratricidal war and to prevent reprisal against Croats.

— Dragoljub Mihailović

However, Dangić did not follow the order, and no Chetnik units from Bosnia came to Mihailović’s aid. Later, Mihailović's Chetniks blamed Major Dangić for the failure in the battles for Užice.

=== Meeting with the Germans ===
Two days after sending the appeal to the Eastern Bosnian Chetniks, Draža Mihailović met with the Germans on 11 November 1941 in the village of Divci. At the meeting, Colonel Mihailović attempted to convince the Germans that he was not their enemy and requested weapons to continue fighting the Partisans. He hoped to obtain arms or at least ammunition from the Germans, and to coordinate Chetnik actions with them in the upcoming operation to destroy the Partisan movement. Nearby in the village of Slovac, approximately 350 Partisans captured by Chetniks were handed over to the Germans.

The Germans categorically rejected his proposals and demanded the unconditional surrender of the Chetniks.

=== Allied support ===
During the days he offered to collaborate with the Germans against the Partisans, Colonel Mihailović sent completely different telegrams to the government and the Allies. On 13 November, Dušan Simović informed Anthony Eden that he had received the following telegram from Colonel Mihailović:

The Communists attacked us and forced us to fight simultaneously against Germans, Communists, Ustaše, and other groups. Despite this, the entire nation supports the King. Hundreds of thousands of our people are unarmed, and those who are armed lack ammunition.

— Colonel Dragoljub Mihailović

On the same day, Dušan Simović intervened through the Yugoslav embassy in USSR, requesting that Moscow urgently instruct the Partisans to submit to Mihailović in the joint struggle against the occupiers. The British made a similar intervention through their ambassador in the USSR. Moscow did not officially order the Partisans to come under Mihailović's command, but Radio Moscow transmitted propaganda messages from Radio London in his favor.

On 15 November, General Dušan Simović promoted Colonel Draža Mihailović over Radio London as commander of “all Yugoslav armed forces in the country.” On 16 November 1941, Mihailović issued a proclamation to Serbs, Croats, and Slovenes declaring himself Commander of all Yugoslav military forces in the occupied territory, placing all armed movements under his command.

Thus arose the most peculiar factual coalition in World War II, composed, in relation to the National Liberation Movement as the sole adversary, of Chetniks, Germans, British, Nedić, and Ustaše.

— Historian Branko Petranović

British liaison officer Bill Hudson realized in mid-November 1941 that Mihailović was attempting to obtain British weapons to eliminate his communist rivals under the pretext of fighting the Germans. Hudson recommended to the British to postpone air deliveries until a joint command of the resistance movement was organized, but Mihailović considered this sabotage.

== Encirclement of the Chetnik headquarters on Ravna Gora ==
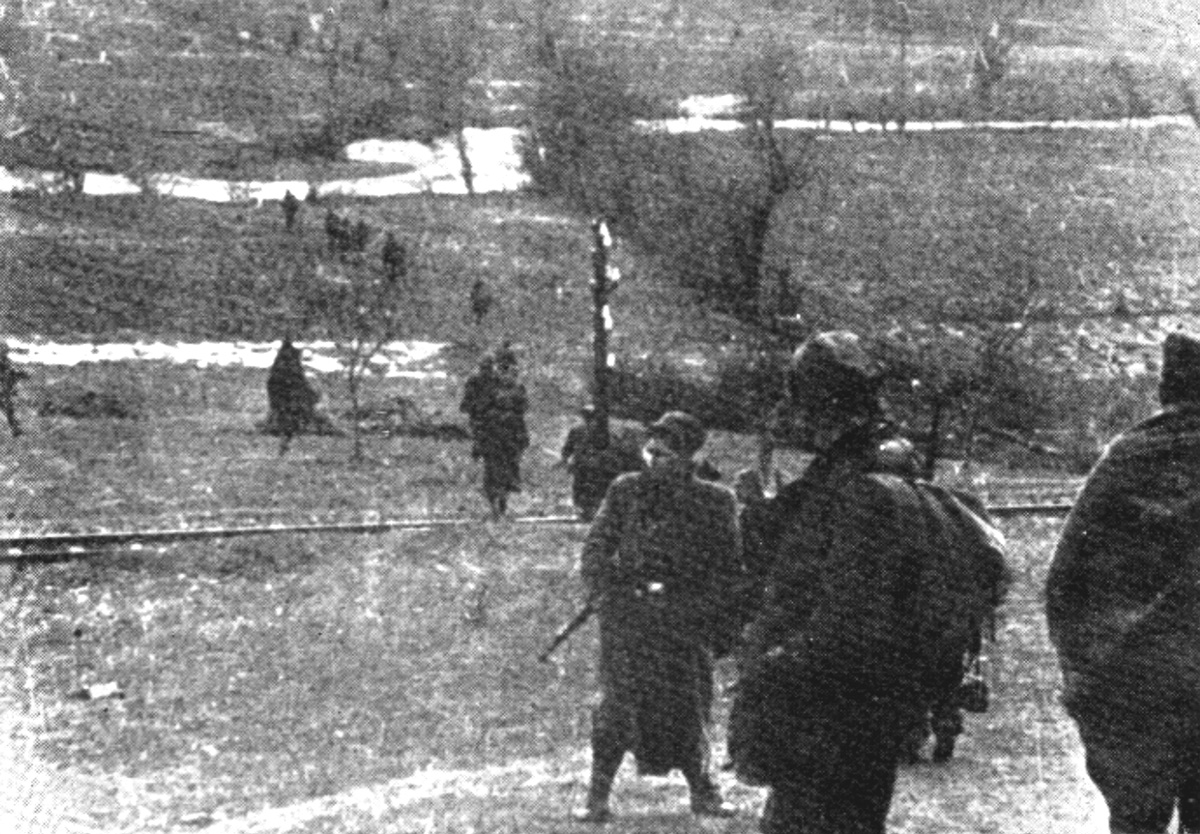
Valjevo Partisans on the way to Ravna Gora at the beginning of 1942.

Partisan units, with smaller forces, relatively quickly defeated Mihailović’s detachments. On 13–14 November, a general advance of Partisan forces toward Ravna Gora followed, forcing the bulk of Chetnik forces to retreat. The Chetniks were soon defeated at Dobrinje, Tometino Polje, Leušić, and Pranjani, and the Partisans encircled Mihailović’s headquarters on Ravna Gora:

The battles with the Chetniks continued. Our forces took Pranjani and could have completely eliminated them in a day or two, but Stari [Tito] ordered that this not be done for foreign policy reasons. Otherwise, Draža Mihailović was almost completely exposed; physically, we also exhausted him. He begged for negotiations through Captain Mitić. We accepted them.

— Vladimir Dedijer

In this situation, Radio London issued a public appeal urging an agreement between the two movements for joint struggle against the occupiers. On 15 November, General Dušan Simović promoted Colonel Draža Mihailović over Radio London as commander of "all Yugoslav armed forces in the country." On 16 November, Mihailović issued a proclamation informing that the King, on the recommendation of the "Yugoslav government-in-exile in London," appointed him Commander of all Yugoslav military forces in the occupied territory of Yugoslavia, placing all armed movements under his command.

Our Supreme Commander, His Majesty King Peter II, confirmed me, on the proposal of the Yugoslav government-in-exile in London, as Commander of all Yugoslav military forces in the occupied territory of the Kingdom of Yugoslavia. Thus, all armed movements in the country are placed under my command and subordinated to the officers I shall appoint, as military law and disciplinary regulations dictate.

— Proclamation of Draža Mihailović, 16 November 1941

Afterwards, Mihailović sent a delegation to the Partisans with written conditions for subordinating themselves to his command. The Partisan leadership rejected these conditions, stating that any cooperation could only be based on mutual agreement.

=== Partisan–Chetnik negotiations ===
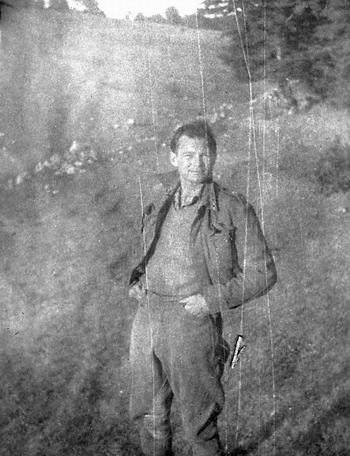
British liaison officer Bill Hudson who attended the negotiations

Negotiations were conducted by delegations of the Supreme Headquarters of the National Liberation Army (NOPOJ) (Aleksandar Ranković, Ivo Lola Ribar, and Petar Stambolić) and Draža Mihailović’s staff (Majors Radoslav Đurić and Mirko Lalatović) on 18 and 20 November 1941 in Čačak. At the first meeting, Chetnik representatives demanded that their conditions be accepted, i.e., that all armed forces be subordinated to Draža Mihailović, which the Partisan delegation refused.

The Partisans were willing to form a joint operational staff but refused to accept Mihailović’s command. Afterwards, Colonel Mihailović ordered Major Radoslav Đurić by telephone: "Return immediately and make an agreement under any conditions."

The Supreme Headquarters of the NOVJ offered Mihailović to join the fight against the Germans, renounce demands for subordinating the Partisans, and resolve the question of unified operational command by agreement. The terms offered were:

1. Mihailović’s units should immediately engage the occupiers;
2. Partisans and Chetniks should fight each in their own sectors against the occupiers;
3. Mihailović should abandon the impossible demand to include Partisan units in Chetnik formations under his officers, as this would not only threaten the Partisans but also the liberation struggle in Serbia generally;
4. All issues regarding unified operational command and other matters would be resolved by agreement immediately after peace was established.

British liaison officer Duane Hudson attended the negotiations, attempting to unify the resistance movement before the Germans launched an offensive. During the meetings on 20 November in Čačak, Hudson reported to Cairo:

In my opinion, Mihailović has all qualifications except strength. The Partisans are now stronger, and he must first eliminate them with British weapons before seriously turning against the Germans. Today he told me that the lack of ammunition will force him to withdraw from Ravna Gora if the Partisans continue to attack him. I attended a Chetnik–Partisan conference and presented your position. The Partisans insist on maintaining their identity regardless of any agreement with the Chetniks. They consider Simović’s ignorance of the Partisans’ leading role in the uprising as evidence that the Yugoslav government does not understand the situation. The Partisans believe the people have lost all trust in former Yugoslav officers, responsible for the collapse. They suspect Mihailović is aiding Nedić and other pro-Axis elements in the fight against Communists. The Partisans will continue fighting Mihailović if he does not accept their terms.

— British liaison officer Bill Hudson

=== Partisan–Chetnik ceasefire ===
Partisan delegates Aleksandar Ranković and Petar Stambolić set the following conditions: form a joint investigative commission of Partisan and Chetnik members to examine issues of fratricidal fighting; form a mixed tribunal to judge all instigators of fratricidal fighting; continue negotiations on all other matters until completion; and, at 12:00 on 21 November, hostilities would cease, units would remain in place, and prisoners from both sides would be released. The ceasefire was agreed upon at a meeting of the two headquarters on 20 November 1941 in Čačak.

When Đurić returned to Mihailović’s headquarters, Dragiša Vasić met him at the door and exclaimed: "You have saved us." Mihailović immediately informed the Yugoslav government that he "succeeded in ending the fratricidal fighting initiated by the other side," that he was trying to unite all forces against the Germans, and that he urgently needed weapons, ammunition, and other supplies:

I have done everything and succeeded in stopping the fratricidal fighting initiated by the other side. In previous battles against both sides, I have used almost all ammunition. I am making every effort to unite all national forces and reorganize for decisive combat against the Germans. Immediate delivery of weapons, ammunition, winter clothing, footwear, and other supplies is urgently needed.

— Telegram from Draža Mihailović to the Yugoslav government in London, 22 November 1941

Immediately afterward, Radio London began celebrating Draža Mihailović as the leader of all patriotic forces in Yugoslavia, which Moscow also broadcast. As a result, on 25 November, General Secretary of the CPY Josip Broz Tito, under the pseudonym »Valter«, sent a protest radiogram to Moscow via a radio station in Zagreb:

Deliver this telegram immediately because Radio Moscow is reporting an outrageous falsehood about D. Mihailović, with whom we have been conducting bloody battles for a month. He is the commander of the Chetniks, gendarmes, and all other scum. He attacked us on 2 November and tried to disarm us, but we completely defeated him, leaving him with only about 500 men—gendarmes. He managed to deceptively disarm about 360 of our men in Gornji Milanovac and then handed them over to the Germans in Valjevo, having stripped them to the shirt and shoes beforehand, and they were mostly executed, the rest made to work naked at the airfield. In Mionica near Valjevo, Draža killed 17 of our nurses and about 20 comrades heading to our headquarters in Užice. In Kosjerić, his men brutally mutilated about 15 of our Partisans and 2 teachers. We found them dead and dismembered and brought them to Užice for everyone to see. They are beasts in human form. Only because of London did we refrain from completely eliminating Draža M., but it will be difficult to restrain our Partisans from doing so. Report above to stop spreading the nonsense that London radio is broadcasting. We have all evidence that Draža openly cooperates with the Germans against us. Draža’s men do not fire a single shot against Germans. All the fighting is done solely by the Partisans.

— Josip Broz Tito

On 29 November 1941, the British government congratulated Mihailović on the agreement with the Partisans and announced aid in material and money:

His Majesty’s Government warmly congratulates Mihailović on the agreement reached with the Partisans. It would be grateful if Mihailović conveys congratulations to the Yugoslav leaders who contributed to the agreement. Material and financial aid will be sent within a week if time permits. The intention of His Majesty’s Government is to continue sending assistance as much as possible, but he must understand that this will depend on maintaining a united front of all patriots in Yugoslavia under Mihailović’s leadership.

— Message from the British government to Draža Mihailović, 29 November 1941

== Aftermath ==
Among the Serbian peasant masses, the mutual fighting between the Partisans and Draža Mihailović's Chetniks caused great confusion and despondency.
