= Battle of Trešnjica =

- Part of World War II in Yugoslavia
Date	2 November 1941
Location	Trešnjica
Result	Partisan victory

Belligerents
Yugoslav Partisans	Chetniks

Commanders and leaders
Dušan Jerković	(Chetniks) Vučko Ignjatović

The Battle of Trešnjica was fought 2 November 1941 between partisan and Chetnik detachments and was the first major battle between Chetniks and partisans. This battle marks the beginning of an open conflict between formations under the command of Josip Broz Tito and Colonel Dragoljub Mihailović and implies the end of the two-month partial cooperation between the Partisan and Ravnagorje Chetnik movements in the area of western and central Serbia .

== Background ==
The reason for the final showdown between the forces of communist and the monarchist bloc was the armed clashes that followed much earlier, as well as the impossibility of both to come to an agreement regarding the joint struggle. The biggest opponent of that agreement was the different ideological and political viewpoints of both parties.

On 20 October Tito addressed Mihailović with a letter containing twelve points, with the intention of smoothing out the misunderstandings that had arisen. A meeting was arranged between him and Mihailović on 27 October in the village of Brajići, near Ravna gora. At the meeting in Brajići, four proposals were first discussed, two from each side. Partisan proposals were to continue the joint armed struggle against the occupying army, regardless of the consequences, and for Colonel Mihailović to transfer to the Partisan Supreme Headquarters as Chief of Staff. The Chetnik side proposed that the partisan units be placed under Mihailović's command and that only those actions advocated and carried out by the Chetniks be carried out against the occupiers. Both sides tried to impose their views on tactics and wanted to gain full control over the armed forces of the other side, so no agreement was reached. The Chetniks did not even accept Tito's proposals to carry out joint military operations against the Germans and Quisling forces, the joint supply of troops, the organization of national liberation committees, partisan and Chetnik formations are filled voluntarily, not by mobilization. At the meeting, agreements were reached on less important matters, including the avoidance of mutual combat, freedom of movement in the liberated territory, and that the partisans hand over to the Chetniks about 1,200 rifles produced in the partisan factory in Užice, as well as part of the money found in the vault of a bank in Užice. Mihailović did not allow the meeting to be attended by the British captain Bill Hudson, who arrived at Ravna Gora from Užice two days earlier.

It is possible that Mihailović had already decided to attack the partisans, but since the British had not yet started to send him help, he was forced to request it from the Germans. In Belgrade, on 28 October, Mihailović's delegates, Colonel Pantić and Captain Nenad Mitrović, met with Abwer agent Jozef Matl, whom they informed that Mihailović had authorized them to establish contact with Milan Nedić and the German army. Pantić and Mitrović asked the Germans for weapons and ammunition, as well as for no German punitive expeditions during the upcoming operation. The German response the next day was that the Germans wanted to meet Mihailović and to guarantee his safety.

On the night of 28-29 October 1941, when he was returning from Užice, on the way to Šumadija, Chetniks Vučka Ignjatović in Užice Požega train of the partisan leader Milan Blagojević and killed on the same night.

Before the decisive battle on Trešnjica, just two days earlier in the area of Ribaševina and Karan, 12 -{km}- from Užice, there were bigger conflict. After major misunderstandings on the ground, the partisan detachments attacked the Chetnik detachment of Ribaseva and Karan 29 October and 30 October 1941 and defeated them.

After this incident, the Supreme Command of the Chetnik detachments made a decision to attack the very center of the free partisan territories, centered in Užice.

In order to thwart such an attempt, the Supreme Headquarters NOV and POJ of the partisan detachments orders that parts of the Užice partisan detachment, Čačan partisan detachment and Dragačevski Battalion are concentrating in the direction of Trešnjica and to defend the approaches to Užice.

The decisive battle takes place at dawn 2 November in 1941 on the Trešnjica hill, 5 km from Užice.

== Forces ==
Immediately before the outbreak of the civil war, larger detachments withdrew from the Siege of the Kings, where these detachments kept the city under blockade for a month. After the destruction of the Karan and Ribashev Chetnik detachments, a plan was created to attack Užice. The plan was elaborated by Vučko Ignjatović. The plan of the attack on Užice was to take place according to the following schedule:

- Ribaševski Chetnik detachment, under the command of captain Miloš Novaković]with 400 men (Attack from the North)
- Požega Chetnik detachment, under the command of Captain Vučko Ignjatović about 1,600 people (Attack from the East)
- Zlatibor Chetnik detachment, under the command of lieutenant colonel Anrije Jevremović, about 700 people (Attack from the South)
- Rural companies (Kremna, Mokra Gora, Šljivovica), about 250 people (Attack from the West)

The main part of the attack was to be carried out by the Požega detachment with about 1,600 men. The coordination of the plan was managed by Captain Milorad Mitić, then the authorized delegate of the Chetnik command in Užice.

Supreme Headquartersfound out about this Chetnik plan and caught a message where it was written that all armed Chetniks should gather in a forest, 10 -{km}- from Užice 1 November. That's how defense was organized. part of the Čačan NOPO, which participated in the siege of Kraljevo, was withdrawn. Around Užice was a complete Užice NOPO, commanded by Dušan Jerković. A labor battalion and a railway company were mobilized from the city itself.

Thus, the partisan schedule was as follows:

- Užice NOP detachment, under the command of Dušan Jerković, close to 2,500 fighters
- Čačan NOP detachment, under the command of Momčilo Radosavljević, about 2,000 fighters
- Dragačevski battalion, about 400 fighters, under the command of Bogdan Kapelan
- Railway and Union company, about 500 fighters

The Supreme Headquarters managed to mobilize a large part of the citizens of Užice before the decisive battle, who joined the partisan detachments. Only one reserve battalion remained to defend the city from a possible air attack.

Partisan headquarters sent well-known party workers in this region towards Zlatibor and Kremna, who managed to dissuade the mobilized peasant masses from the civil war through persuasion. On 31 October it was successful from the beginning, as the partisans were pushed towards Užice. Nevertheless, the partisans, with the help of a part of the Užice partisan detachment, managed to repel the Chetniks as far as Crnokosa and capture their commander. Thus, until 1 November, the partisans neutralized the Chetnik attack from three sides.

== Battle ==
The last and most numerous Chetnik formation under the command of Ignjatović launched an attack from the direction of Požega 2 November at 3 o'clock in the morning. Having expected an attack from that side, the Supreme Headquarters sent the 1st Užice company to the Trešnjica hill, the most suitable place for defense a few kilometers in front of the city, and the 4th company to Šerelj. The first fighting began half an hour later, in rainy weather, when the Dragačev Partisan Battalion surprised the left column of the Požega Chetnik detachment, halfway between Gorjan and Sevojno The column was broken up and retreated back to Požega.

However, the main attack was carried out by the middle and right columns, making their way towards Trešnjica.

Around 5 o'clock in the morning, sirens sounded in Užice. The meeting of the People's Liberation Committee was interrupted because an order had arrived for everyone to mobilize and head to Trešnjica, where there was already a lot of fighting going on.

Around 5:40 a.m. in front of the building of the Užice municipality, commander Dušan Jerković appeared and called on the people to oppose the Chetniks who were heading for Užice. In a short time, several battalions were mobilized and sent in trucks towards Trešnjica. Heavy fighting has been going on for about 6 hours on Trešnjica between Užice NOP Detachmentand the Dragačev Battalion on the one hand, and the right and middle Chetnik columns on the other.

The right attack column occupies Trešnjica and allows the Ribasevin detachment to enter the fight again. Then Karan (Užice) was captured, but at Veliki Metaljek there was a consolidation of partisan forces and a large counterattack that pushed back the Chetnik units. After the battle on Trešnjica, all partisan units that participated in that battle pursued the Chetniks all the way to Požega and Glumč.

== Result ==
In order to end the open conflict between Chetniks and partisans as soon as possible, which had already started with partisan attacks on Karan and Ribasevina, colonel Draža Mihailović wrote an order, which was signed by his deputy, lieutenant colonel Dragoslav Pavlović that all the forces participating in the Siege of Kraljeva should withdraw and head in the direction of Požega.

The commander of the siege of Kraljevo, Major Radoslav Đurić did not carry out this order, so the same order was passed on to Captain Jovan Deroko, chief of staff for the siege of Kraljevo, who tried to carry it out, but it was already too late, because the conflict has already begun in a big way.

In addition, invitations were sent to the commanders of the Cers Chetnik detachment, Major Dragoslav Račić and the Bosnian Chetnik detachments, Major Jezdimir Dangić to help their forces in the fight against the partisans.

Some historians believe that it was fatal for the entire Chetnik movement, because the opportunity to destroy the People's Liberation Movement was missed in its beginning and the beginning of the uprising against the occupier.

After two weeks of continuous fighting, the Partisans surrounded the Chetnik headquarters on Ravna Gora. The Partisans gave up liquidating Mihailović's headquarters after a Radio Moskve broadcast in which Mihailović was listed as the leader of all resistance forces in Serbia. Tito understood that the fight against the Chetniks, and Mihailović's eventual death, could cause problems for the Soviet Union in its relations with Great Britain. That is why he ordered that the fighting be stopped and that parliamentarians be sent to the Chetniks for negotiations.

== Sources ==
- Tomasevich, Jozo (1975). War and Revolution in Yugoslavia, 1941–1945: The Chetniks. Stanford: Stanford University Press. ISBN 978-0-8047-0857-9.
- Milovanović, Nikola (1983a). Kontrarevolucionarni pokret Draže Mihailovića: Izdaja. Vol. I. Beograd: Slovo ljubve. Archived from the original on 2013-04-23.
- Глишић, Венцеслав (1986). Ужичка република. Београд: Нолит. ISBN 978-86-19-01302-4. Archived from the original on 2013-04-24.
