= Brajan =

Brajan is a Serbian and Albanian male given name. It may refer to:

- Brajan Nenezić (born 1953), Yugoslav footballer
- Petar (fl. 1332), nicknamed Brajan, a Serbian count that built the White Church in Karan, Užice
- Brajan Gruda (born 2004), German footballer

== See also ==
- Brian, Irish name, transcribed in Serbian as "Brajan"; variants Bryan, Brayan.
- Brajko, Serbian name
