= Partisan–Chetnik War (1941–1945) =

Armed conflict

- Part of the Second World War in Yugoslavia
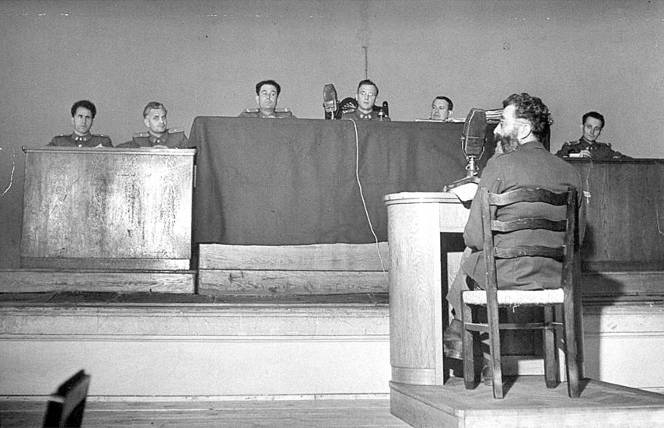
- Photo of the Trial of Draža Mihailović, the main General of the Chetnik movement
Date	2 November 1941 – 15 May 1945
Location	Yugoslavia
Result	Yugoslav Partisan victory: Establishment of Communist Yugoslavia; Trial of Draža Mihailović; Start of Communist purges in Serbia and the Chetnik insurgency

Belligerents
Yugoslav Partisans (Kingdom of Yugoslavia) Yugoslav government-in-exile (from September 1944); Soviet Union; Bulgarian Resistance; LANÇ; United Kingdom (from 1943); United States (from 1943); Supported by: Independent State of Croatia (1942)	Chetniks: Slovene Chetniks; Pećanac Chetniks; Dinara Division; (Kingdom of Yugoslavia) Yugoslav government-in-exile (until September 1944); United Kingdom (until 1943); United States (until 1943) (Nazi Germany) Germany (from 1943): Serbia (from 1941); Italy (from 1942)

Commanders and leaders
(Yugoslav Partisans) Josip Broz Tito (WIA) (Yugoslav Partisans) Aleksandar Ranković (Yugoslav Partisans) Vladimir Perić † (Yugoslav Partisans) Arso Jovanović (Yugoslav Partisans) Mladen Stojanović (executed) (Yugoslav Partisans) Vicko Krstulović (Yugoslav Partisans) Kosta Nađ (Yugoslav Partisans) Koča Popović (Yugoslav Partisans) Vlado Dapčević (Yugoslav Partisans) Milan Blagojević Španac (executed) (Soviet Union) Fyodor Tolbukhin (Soviet Union) Nikolai Gagen; Vladimir Stoychev; Enver Hoxha	(Chetniks) Draža Mihailović (executed) (Chetniks) Ilija Trifunović-Birčanin # (Chetniks) Pavle Đurišić † (Chetniks) Momčilo Đujić (surrendered) (Chetniks) Dobroslav Jevđević (Chetniks) Zvonimir Vučković (Chetniks) Petar Baćović (executed) (Chetniks) Stanko Vrhovac (executed) (Chetniks) Vojislav Lukačević (executed) (Chetniks) Vučko Ignjatović (executed) (Chetniks) Miroslav Trifunović † (Chetniks) Kosta Pećanac (executed) (Chetniks) Lazar Tešanović (Chetniks) Ljubo Novaković (executed) (Chetniks) Bajo Stanišić † (Chetniks) Karl Novak (Nazi Germany) Alexander Löhr (executed) (Nazi Germany) Karl von Oberkamp (executed) (Nazi Germany) Lothar Rendulic (Fascist Italy) Mario Roatta (Fascist Italy) Lorenzo Vivalda (executed)

Strength
20,000 (1941); 100,000 (1943); 800,000 (1945)	Up to 5,000 (1941); 93,000 (1943); Unknown (1945)

Casualties and losses
(Yugoslav Partisans) Up to 20,000	(Chetniks) 20,000–30,000

The Partisan–Chetnik War or 1941-1945 Yugoslav internal War was an armed conflict between the communist Yugoslav Partisans and the monarchist Chetniks which lasted from 1941 (after the end of the Chetnik Partisan Alliance during the Serbian Uprising in the Second World War) until 1945 (the end of the Second World War in Yugoslavia).

== Background ==
After the Axis invasion of Yugoslavia in April 1941, strong antifascist resistance began to emerge as the occupying forces unleashed terror against the local populations. The first Yugoslav Partisans unit emerged on 22 June, following a German attack against the USSR. These formations would come to be led by Josip Broz Tito. Meanwhile, by May 1941, Colonel Draža Mihailović who refused to surrender after the Royal Yugoslav Army's capitulation, raised an armed rebellion against occupying German forces in Serbia. He designated his forces as Chetniks, which had been a traditional denomination for Serbian guerilla fighters. The two were ideologically opposed. The Chetniks were a Serbian nationalist and royalist force who sought a Yugoslavia under Serbian royalty, whereas the Partisans were communists who strived for a socialist republic.

In October 1941, fighting broke out between the Partisans and Chetniks. By December, tensions boiled into civil war between the factions. Before the start of hostilities, the Partisans and Chetniks launched an armed uprising against Nazi-occupied Serbia after an incident in the town of Bela Crkva on 7 July. This uprising was remarkable as it created the first free territory in all of Europe during the Second World War and the first liberated city in the Second World War. At the beginning of the uprising, Chetnik-Partisan collaboration was an undeniable reason for the initial success of the uprising. This is why many historians consider this conflict a brotherly war. The most significant Chetnik-Partisan victories were in Užice, Loznica, Banja Koviljača, and Krupanj. This joint action would be the primary reason for the establishment of the Užice Republic.

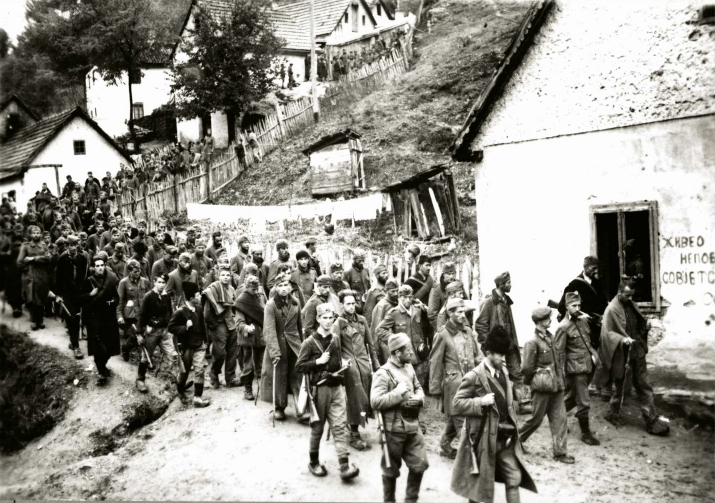
Captured German soldiers after the First Liberation of Užice

== The civil war in Serbia ==
=== Prior tensions and the first days of the conflict ===
Even though the Chetnik-Partisan war directly started at the beginning of November, tensions were already high as of November 27 when Tito and Mihajlović met in Brajići to discuss the future of the anti-fascist struggle and to resolve the ideological differences between the Communists and Chetniks. These negotiations failed, and Chetnik-Partisan relations would never be the same again.

Just a day later, on the night of November 28, a Partisan commander named "Španac" was ambushed and killed by a Chetnik detachment under Vučka Ignjatović. On the same day, Draža's men met with Jozef Matl and established contact with Nedić and the German Army. Two days before the incident in Trešnjica, as a reprisal for the death of Španac (or just complications on the battlefield), Chetnik positions near Užice were attacked by Partisans. Due to this, the Chetniks launched an attack on Trešnjica (5 km from Užice) and failed. After this battle, the Chetniks withdrew from Kraljevo and marched on Požega.

On November 4, the Chetniks ambushed the Partisans near Samaile, resulting in the death of Partisan commander Srećko Nikolić. Tensions near Čačak escalated, culminating in the Partisans declaring Bogdan Marijanović (leader of the Čačak Chetniks) a traitor and sentencing him to death.

On November 6, the Chetniks under Radoslav Đurić sent an ultimatum to the Partisans, demanding the dissolution of the "People's Liberation Front" (Partisans). The Partisans denied this ultimatum, and at 6 p.m., the Chetniks attacked Čačak. The attack lasted two days and resulted in heavy casualties on both sides. The Chetniks also planned to attack the Partisans in Gornji Milanovac and Guča, but these attacks did not happen due to the Chetniks' unwillingness to proceed.

=== Expansion of the conflict ===
On 11 November, in a village near Valjevo, Draža Mihailović held talks with members of the German Wehrmacht. He claimed that he would attack the Partisans but would not support German attacks. Unaware of these secret talks, the British continued supporting Draža. On 14 November, Radio London declared that Draža was the only legitimate Yugoslav revolutionary. Meanwhile, major fighting between the Partisans and Chetniks began on 13 November at Ravna Gora. This battle lasted until 20 November and resulted in a Chetnik defeat, leading to a temporary ceasefire. Later, Chetnik delegates offered to place the Partisans under Mihailović's command, but the Partisans rejected this offer. In the territories they controlled, the communists began disarming average civilians. Here is what Draža had to say on that issue:

The Partisans took the weapons from individuals, believing that those arms are national property, while I believed that it was the property of every individual. — Draža Mihailović

At 12 o'clock on 21 November, the ceasefire agreed upon by Chetnik and Partisan forces after the battle at Ravna Gora was enacted. This ceasefire was celebrated by Chetnik commander Dragiša Vasić, who believed it would save the Chetniks as a movement.

=== The fall of the Free Territory ===
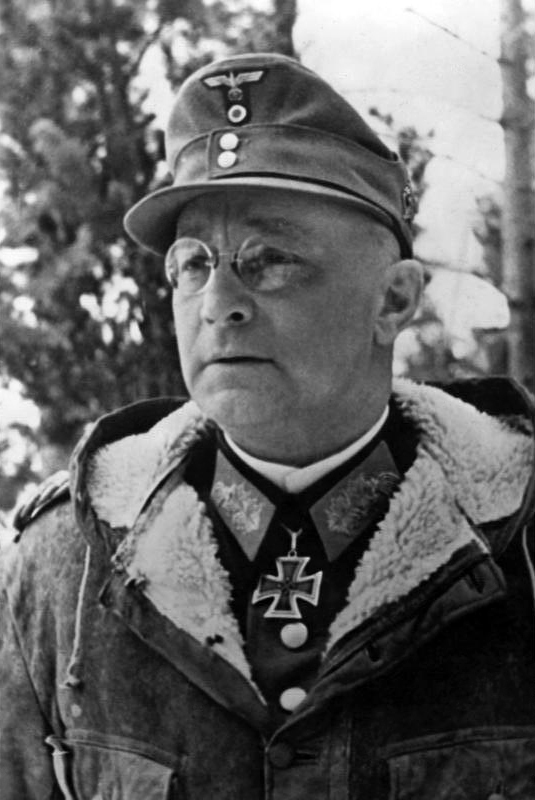
Franz Böhme crushed the Uprising in Serbia

By mid-November, the Germans began their grand attack on the Free Territory of Užice. The Germans attacked both the Partisans and Chetniks despite the fact that the Chetniks held talks with the Germans on the 11th. These talks failed to reach an agreement, and the Nazis even tried to arrest Mihajlović. The German offensive was supported by the forces of Dimitrije Ljotić and Kosta Pećanac. By the second half of November, the final phase of the offensive was in action. Both the Chetniks and Partisans were overrun during this offensive. Tito and Mihajlović had their last phone call during this time, in which Tito announced that he would defend his positions, while Mihajlović said he would disperse. During the second phase of the offensive, the Partisans lost multiple cities. They withdrew from Užice on November 29 and began their retreat to Sandžak. Small groups of Partisans were left in western Serbia and Sandžak, but they were liquidated by 1942. The Chetniks also withdrew into Sandžak after their Defeat in Operation Mihajlović.

== Course of the war ==
=== The Sandžak Struggle ===
Following the harsh defeat of the Partisans, the remnants of the Serbian partisan divisions retreated to Sandžak, which allowed the badly defeated Partisans to regroup and reorganize. Due to the defeat in Serbia, the leader of the Partisans, Tito, tried to step down as leader on December 7; however, this was not accepted by the Politburo. Partisan defeats continued, with the biggest example being the crushing of the Montenegrin Partisan Order at the Battle of Pljevlja. Additionally, the Partisans faced another defeat at Sjenica. Despite these setbacks, the Partisans were able to liberate Novi Varoš, which became the center of the Free Territory in Sandžak. On December 21, 1941, on Stalin's birthday, the First Proletarian Brigade was formed. The Partisans and Chetniks regularly clashed around Uvac from December 25 until February 1942, when the Partisans successfully breached the lake and attempted to break through into Serbia. The biggest clashes occurred in Negbine, Ljubiša, Ojkovce, and Močioca. Although initially successful, the Partisans failed to achieve their objective of linking up with the remnants of the Serbian partisans. Milan Nedić, fearing continued partisan attacks in Serbia, began organizing a major offensive against the Partisan Free Territory in Sandžak. Nedić allied himself with Italian divisions, Muslim militias, and Sandžak Chetniks for a general offensive against the Partisans. Before the start of the offensive, the Chetniks and Muslims attacked the village of Novi Varoš. This attack failed, and the alliance of Chetniks and Muslims was beaten back in the direction of Sjenica.

The main offensive began on February 5, 1942, targeting Novi Varoš. The overwhelmed Partisans left Novi Varoš on February 5, and the fascist coalition took over the town. The Partisans redeployed to Zlatar; however, it would have been very difficult for them to hold Zlatar during the winter. On February 6, the march on Zlatar began. On February 7, minor clashes between the Partisans and Chetniks occurred around Kosatice. On February 9, the Partisans successfully maneuvered to Western Sandžak, suffering relatively few casualties and avoiding a major enemy offensive. Ultimately, at the end of the Sandžak struggle, the Partisans were able to retreat to Eastern Bosnia with few casualties.

Battles for Eastern Bosnia (1942)

Following the Partisan redeployment into Eastern Bosnia, battles began erupting as the region quickly became a major war zone involving multiple factions (Partisans, Chetniks, Germans, Italians, and Ustaše). Major fighting began on the 10th when the Partisan Romanija Corps attacked Ustaša Home Guards in the village of Kuli. An Ustaša counterattack followed, and Rogatica fell. The first major Partisan-Chetnik combat in Eastern Bosnia occurred on the 20th when the Partisans were attacked in the village of Vukosavci by Chetniks under the command of Dragoslav Račić. The Partisans crushed the Chetniks of Boško Tudorović, leading to the creation of volunteer divisions by the Partisans. In the village of Zakum near Rogatica, the Chetniks imprisoned the leaders of the Partisan Romanija Corps, who were executed the following day. The Partisans made plans for several attacks in Eastern Bosnia. They first intended to attack Vlasnica, where the so-called "King of Romanija," Jezdimir Dangić, resided, and then Han Pijesak, where the Ustaše were based. The Partisans eventually gave up on Han Pijesak because it was under siege by Chetniks, and an attack on the village would appear as though the Partisans were collaborating with the Ustaše. Ultimately, the Partisans attacked Vlasnica under the motto of "liquidating Nedić's men in Bosnia." However, humanity prevailed in the clashes, and both the Partisans and Chetniks stopped fighting each other because most fighters on both sides were Serbs. This is evident in Radoslav Đurišić's report to Draža Mihajlović:

"Some commanders and officers, as soon as they learned about the presence of Partisans, asked their men if they would fight against them. All, without exception, except for Račić's men, stated that they would not fight because the Partisans were also Serbs, and they had come to fight only against the Ustaše."

The Partisans of the First and Second Proletarian Brigades attacked Vlasenica, resulting in the Chetniks withdrawing from their siege on the Ustaše and calling for volunteers in their war against the Partisans. Due to this, Tito received heavy criticism and gave orders for his troops to leave the battle. Despite Tito's orders, he received news that on March 18, the Partisans had taken Vlasnica. Chetnik commander Radoslav Đurić described the takeover of Vlasnica:

"In Vlasenica, they immediately announced that they had liberated it from collaborators. Additionally, they called on the Muslim community to report the names of officers who had mistreated and killed them."

The Chetniks found themselves outnumbered and unpopular, with the Muslim population unwilling to fight the Partisans and many officers abandoning their positions. In desperation, the Chetniks called for help from Ljotić and Nedić. On March 29, the Partisans of Eastern Bosnia received criticism from the Partisan High Command: "We were very surprised that our directives did not reach you in time. We will need to determine who is responsible for this. We agree that your movement was ultimately correct, and it is fortunate that it ended so successfully. However, your letters indicate that, from a political perspective, the movement had negative aspects because it was carried out when Chetnik units were fighting the Ustaše near Han Pijesak. In our opinion, the negative aspect of your movement towards Vlasenica can only be addressed by decisively organizing the liquidation of the Ustaše and Croats (homeguards) at Han Pijesak, with the participation of some of our brigade units as needed. This would effectively counter any accusations against us. When we sent you directives strongly opposing your temporary movement towards Vlasenica, we thought it was absolutely wrong to position our forces between the Ustaše and Chetniks. We wanted to wait and see how things would develop, given the failed negotiations between the Croats and Serbs, under German pressure, regarding the cession of 17 districts to Serbia. At this moment, we need to avoid anything that could contribute to a rapprochement between Nedić and Pavelić, and instead do everything possible to intensify conflicts between them, if that is at all possible." By the end of March, the Chetniks had been almost completely liquidated in Eastern Bosnia. They spread propaganda about the conquest of Eastern Bosnia, claiming that after the capture of Vlasnica, they handed it over to the Ustaše. By April 8, the Chetniks were expelled from Drinjača by the Ustaše. After the defeat of the Chetniks the Axis started The Third Enemy Offensive.

=== Third enemy offensive ===
On April 8, the final phase of the Battle of Eastern Bosnia began with the start of Operation Trio, during which the Chetniks collaborated with the Italians, Germans, and Ustaše. The goal of the operation was to destroy the Partisans in Eastern Bosnia. However, despite some Chetniks collaborating with the Axis, there were also those who refused to help, and these Chetniks were treated the same way as the Partisans. The Chetniks who refused collaboration had heavy battles around Drinjače with the Black Legion and were ultimately defeated around the Drina by April 25.

Meanwhile, NDH and German soldiers advanced, and the Partisans began to retreat southwards. Due to this, the Germans hesitated on the option of cutting their losses and ending the offensive. On April 22, the Axis, along with the collaborating Chetniks, attacked Partisans in Romanija and Glasnica. Realizing that they were completely outnumbered and outgunned, the Partisans marched and reached the Italian zone of the NDH on the 27th. The Germans and Ustaše captured the city of Rogatica after the successful transfer of Partisan troops to the Italian zone of the NDH and Northern Montenegro. The combined force of Chetniks and Italians wiped out the Partisans from Hercegovina and Eastern Bosnia. A Partisan force containing the remnants of the Sandžak and Montenegrin partisans launched a semi-successful counteroffensive in the areas of Sarajevo-Mostar. Following this counteroffensive, the Partisans began their Long March. In the meantime the battle of Kozara ravaged Western Bosnia.

== Aftermath ==
In aftermath, conflicts continued within the émigré communities, sometimes taking extreme forms such as terrorist attacks on SFRY embassies and, on the other hand, operations by the Yugoslav state security service aimed at the liquidation of political opponents.
