= Vučko =

Vučko, a hypocoristic term for "wolf", may refer to:

- Vučko (given name)
  - Vučko Borilović (1988–2022), perpetrator of the 2022 Cetinje shooting
  - Vučko Ignjatović (1909–1942), Serbian officer of the Royal Yugoslav Army
- Vučko (surname)
- Vučko (mascot), the Olympic mascot of the 1984 Winter Olympics
