= Španac =

Španac (eng: The Spaniard) may refer to:

== People ==
Nickname of the Yugoslav volunteers in the Spanish Civil War (1936–1939):

- Milan Blagojević Španac, (1905–1941), Yugoslav partisan.
- Žikica Jovanović Španac, (1914–1942), Yugoslav partisan
