= Milan Blagojević - Namenska =

Serbian defense company

Coordinates: 43°51′29″N 20°07′59″E

- Native name: Милан Благојевић - Наменска; Milan Blagojević - Namenska
- Type: Joint-stock company
- Industry: Defense; Chemical
- Founded: 27 October 1949; 76 years ago 19 June 2000; 26 years ago (current form)
- Headquarters: Radnička bb, Lučani, Serbia
- Area served: Worldwide
- Key people: Predrag Ilić (General director)
- Revenue: ▼€54.20 million (2018)
- Net income: ▼€7.06 million (2018)
- Total assets: ▲€86.15 million (2018)
- Total equity: ▲€49.63 million (2018)
- Owner: Government of Serbia (70.3%); Development Fund (16.5%); Municipality of Lučani (9.3%); Others (3.8%)
- Number of employees: 1,301 (2018)
- Website: mbnamenska.com
- Footnotes; Business ID: 07327153; Tax ID: 101263524

Milan Blagojević - Namenska (Serbian: Милан Благојевић - Наменска, romanized: Milan Blagojević - Namenska) is a Serbian defense company. With around 1,300 employees, it is one of the largest employers in Moravica District.

== History ==
The company was founded in 1949. It was named after famous Yugoslav Partisan Milan Blagojević Španac who is credited for initiating the resistance in Yugoslavia during World War II.

During the 1990s, the company has deteriorated due to the Yugoslav Wars and international sanctions against Serbia and Montenegro.

In last two decades, the company has invested more than 50 million euros in modernization of technological processes, measures of protection at work, and fire protection. However, in 2017, two consecutive fires broke out, injuring four workers of whom two had died of large burns.

As of 2025, Milan Blagojević - Namenska exports more than 90% of its products.

== Products ==
The company offers a variety of products for defence industry. It manufactures nitrocellulose, nitroglycerin, ball powders and dynamite applications. The notable products are:

- shot shell, rifle, and pistol and revolver powders,
- double base powders,
- military powders, such as aircraft and antiaircraft, mortar shells, mortar shells-extend range, artillery ammunition, ignition powder, and grenade launchers,
- conventional powder charges,
- sport and other special powders.

The company also provides combustible components and increment containers for mortar ammunition. Apart for military purposes, it offers products for civil consumers. Celluloid is manufactured for use in furniture and interior decoration, drawing and writing accessories, music instruments, toys, sport equipment, and optic accessories. In addition, it offers consulting, modernization of process technology, design and engineering, transfer of technology, and training personnel services.

== Accidents ==
In a 1997 accident, eight employees were killed when the fire broke out in the company's facilities. On 21 September 2011, one employee was injured after minor fire in the production hall. On 25 June 2012, one employee was hurt after a rocket fuel explosion on a production line.

On 14 July 2017, fire broke out in one department of the factory, and two employees got life-threatening burns. The cause of fire was unsafe transport of goods (i.e. gunpowder) due to lacking protection measures of the company. Both employees, Milomir Milivojević and Milojko Ignjatović, later died due to large burns. In 2025, the Court of Appeal in Kragujevac overturned the first-instance verdict, acquitting one manager and reducing the sentence of the head of Safety and Occupational Health to two years in prison.

On 2 August 2017, another fire broke out, hurting two employees, of which one had 35% of the body covered in burns. Following the accidents, the Prime Minister of Serbia Ana Brnabić and the Minister of Defence Aleksandar Vulin stated that the government will continue to invest in the factory's safety, but that "accidents will continue to happen until the full process automation is reached". From 1995 until 2017, a total of 18 employees were killed in various accidents in production facilities of Milan Blagojević - Namenska.

On 17 January 2018, another fire broke out while the employees were cleaning the precipitator of nitrocellulose, hurting two of them. On 10 October 2018, another employee was injured after minor explosion.

== See also ==
- Defense industry of Serbia
