= Vučko (surname) =

Vučko is a surname. Notable people with the surname include:

- Damir Vučko
- Hana Vučko (born 1998), Slovenian handball player
- Jurica Vučko (born 1976), Croatian footballer
- Luka Vučko (born 1984), Croatian footballer
