= White Church of Karan =

Serbian Orthodox church in Karan, Serbia

White Church, Karan
- Бела црква каранска (Serbian); Bela crkva karanska (Serbian)
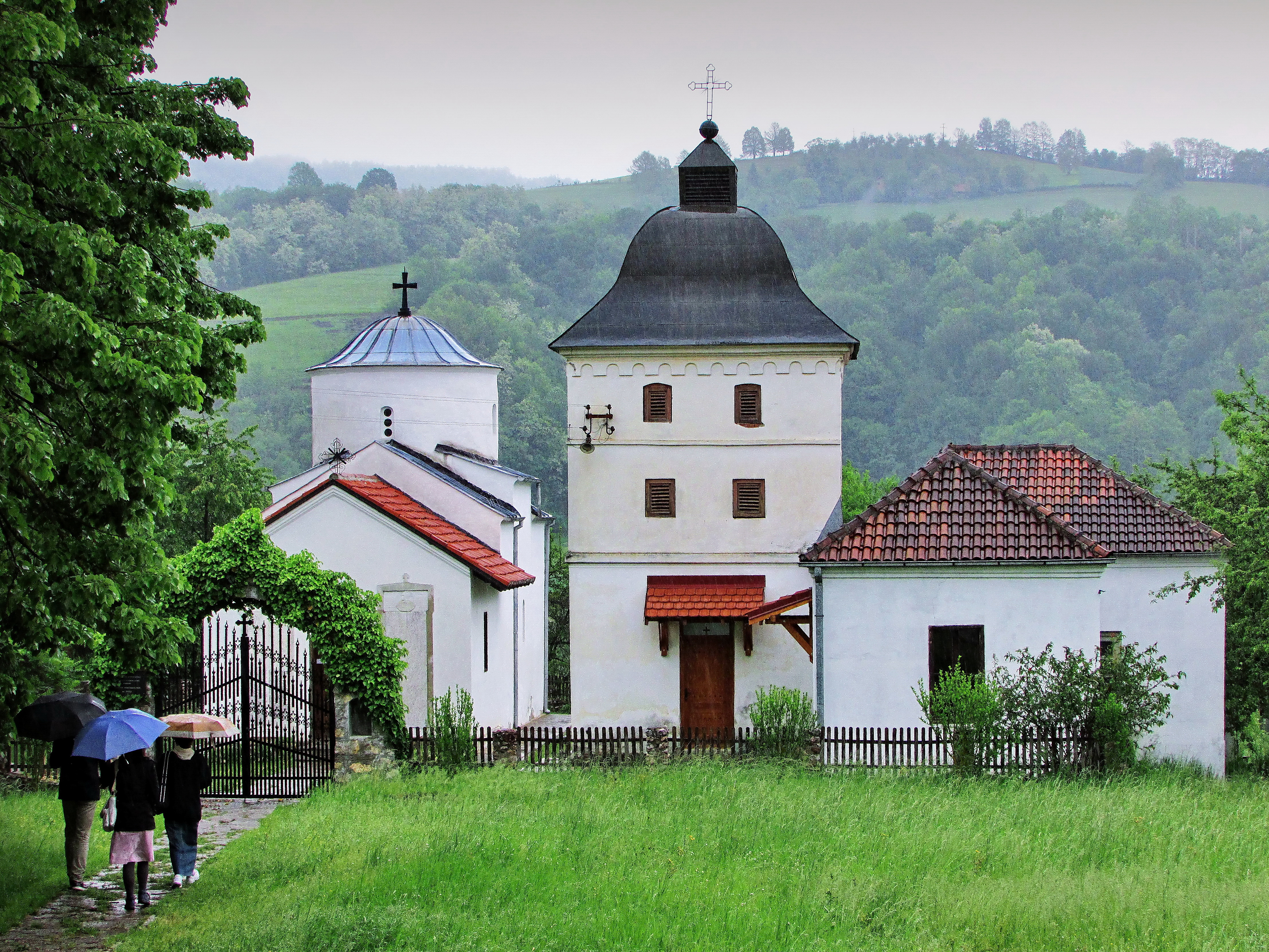

- Location within Serbia
- 43.9150°N 19.9117°E
- Type: Serbian Orthodox parish church
- Location: Karan, Užice Municipality, Zlatibor District, Serbia

History
- Built: from 1340 until 1342

Cultural Heritage of Serbia
- Type: Cultural Monument of Great Importance
- Designated: 1982
- Reference no.: SK 186

The White Church of Karan (Serbian Cyrillic: Бела црква каранска; Serbian: Bela crkva karanska) is a Serbian Orthodox parish church in the village of Karan, Užice Municipality, Serbia. It is dedicated to the Annunciation to Mary. The church was listed as a Cultural Monument of Great Importance.

== History ==
The church was established by Župan Petar Brajan between 1340 and 1342 on the site of a former Roman worship house, according to the tombs excavated by archaeologists near the building.

== Architecture ==
The White Church is typical of the Raška architectural school. It has three bays and is topped by a cupola. The eastern part of the church has a semi-circular apse with a stone iconostasis. The narthex dates back to the late 19th century.

The church has 14th-century frescoes. The western frescoes represent Župan Brajan and his wife Struja, his son and three daughters, while the eastern frescoes show Emperor Stefan Dušan with his wife Jelena and his son Uroš, as well as saints of the Nemanjić dynasty (namely Simeon, Sava and Milutin). Other frescoes depict scenes from the Old Testament, as well as scenes of Mary's life and the Virgin Mary with angels.
