= Ribaševina =

Coordinates: 43°56′08″N 19°52′25″E

- Village
- Interactive map of Ribaševina
- Country: Serbia
- Time zone: UTC+1 (CET)
  - Summer (DST): UTC+2 (CEST)

Ribaševina (Serbian Cyrillic: Рибашевина) is a village located in the Užice municipality of Serbia. According to the 2011 census, the village had a population of 378.
