= Petar Brajan =

- župan (count)
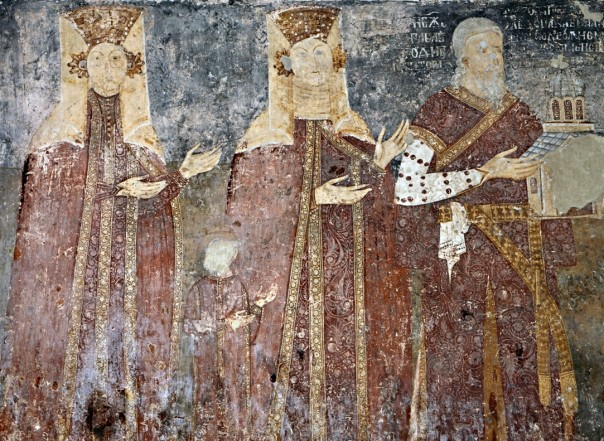
- Fresco of Petar Brajan and two female relatives
- Buried: White Church (sr) in Karan, Užice
- Spouse: Struja
- Memorials: White Church (endowment)

Petar Brajan (Serbian Cyrillic: Петар Брајан, fl. 1340–42) was a Serbian župan (count). He is known as the ktetor (founder) of the White Church in Karan, Užice, which served as a family mausoleum. The church was erected on site of an older temple from the 10th century, mentioned in a charter edited by Byzantine Emperor Basil II in 1020. There are fresco portraits of Brajan and his family (his wife, son and three daughters) and of the Serbian Emperor Stefan Dušan (while he was a king), and his son Uroš V.

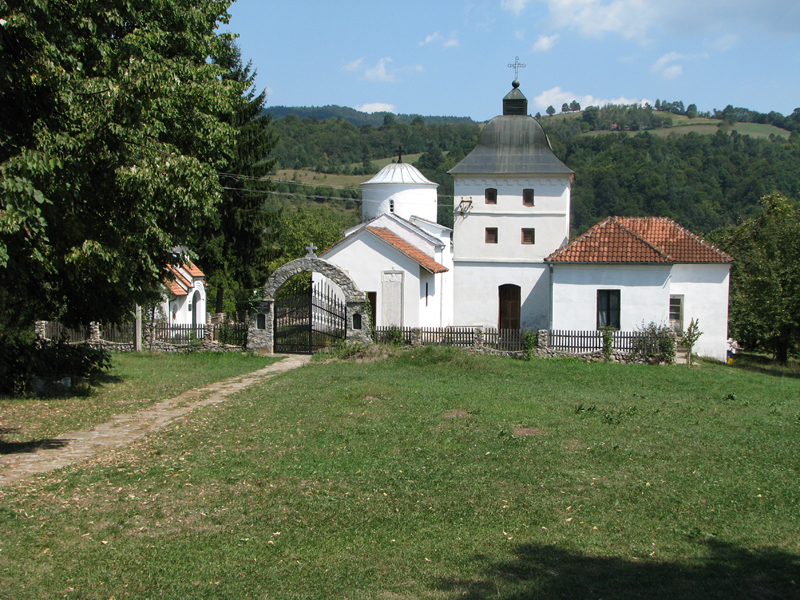
White Church today.

== See also ==
- Serbian nobility in the Middle Ages
