= Brajići, Gornji Milanovac =

Brajići Брајићи
- Village
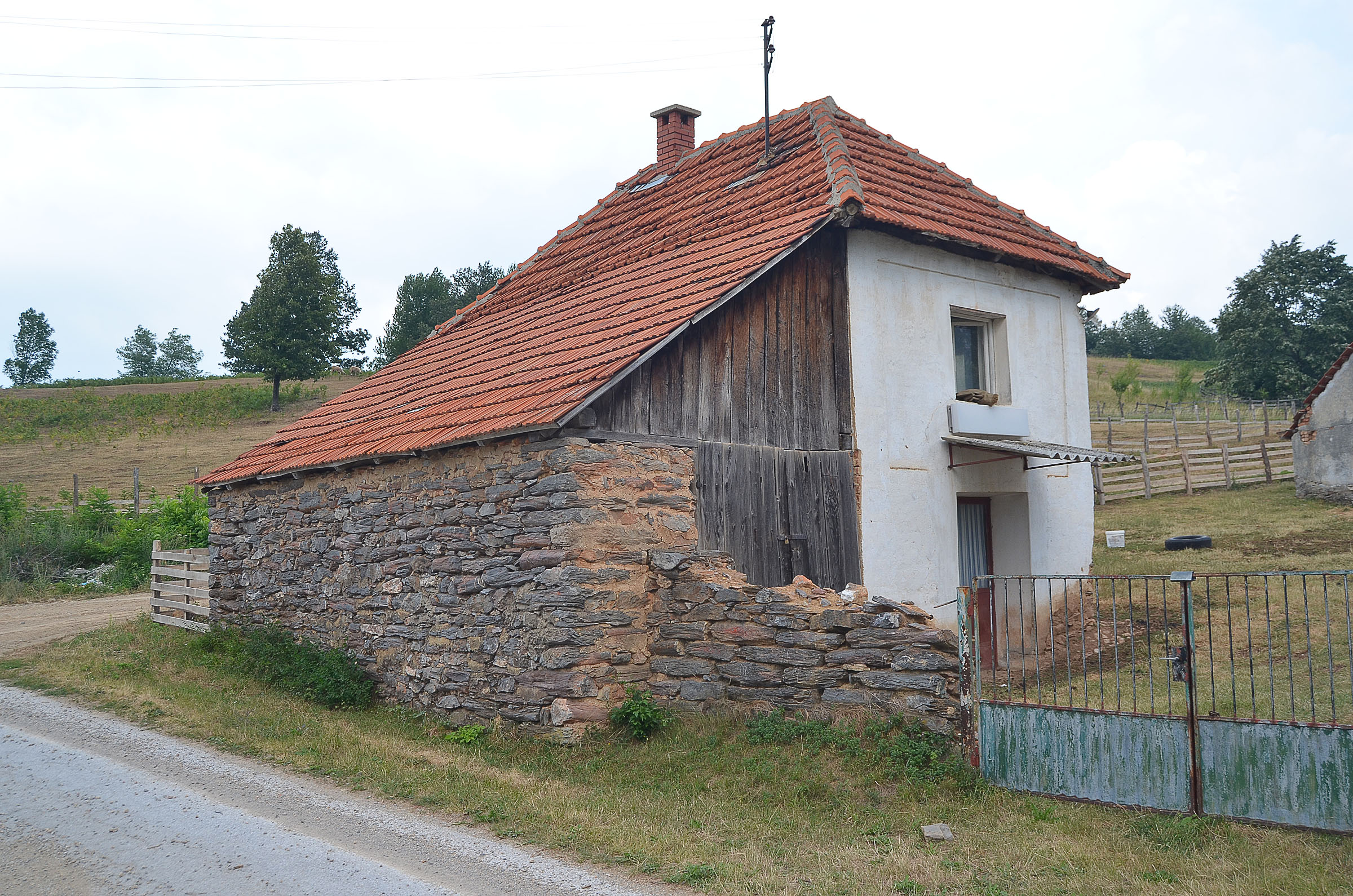
- A building in Brajići

- Location within Serbia
- Coordinates: 44°05′58″N 20°12′21″E
- Country: Serbia
- District: Moravica District
- Municipality: Gornji Milanovac

Population (2002)
  - Total: 67
- Time zone: UTC+1 (CET)
  - Summer (DST): UTC+2 (CEST)

Brajići is a village in the municipality of Gornji Milanovac, Serbia. According to the 2002 census, the village has a population of 67 people.

== History ==
The village was active in the Serbian Revolution, being organized into the knežina (administrative unit) of Brusnica (Takovo) during the First Serbian Uprising (1804–13). The revolutionary Radovan Bojić came from the village.

At the early stage of the World War II in Yugoslavia, on 27 October 1941, the village was a site of the meeting between Yugoslav Partisans leader Josip Broz Tito and Četnik leader Draža Mihajlović.
