= Karan (Užice) =

- Village
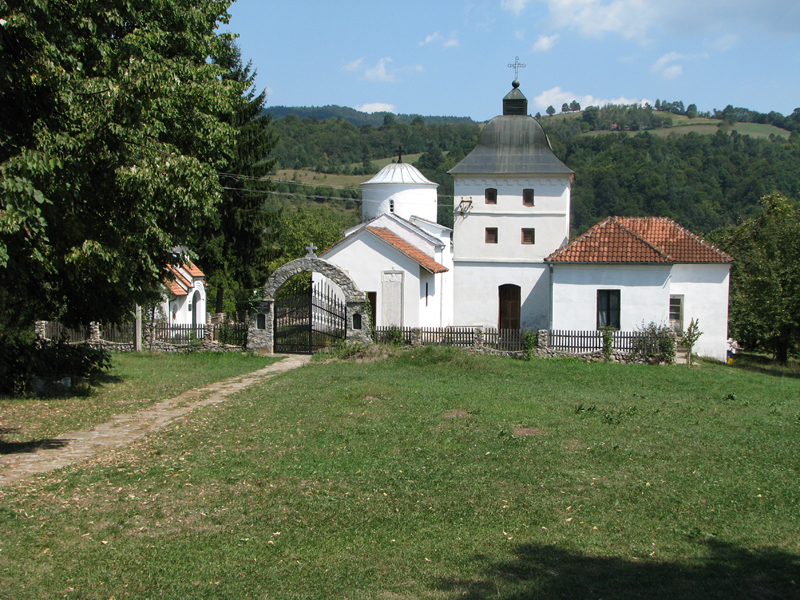
- White Church in Karan (14th century)

- Location within Serbia
- Coordinates: 43°55′N 19°55′E
- Country: Serbia
- Time zone: UTC+1 (CET)
  - Summer (DST): UTC+2 (CEST)

Karan (Serbian Cyrillic: Каран) is a village in western Serbia, located in the municipality of Užice, in the Zlatibor District. According to the 2011 census, its population numbered 516.

There is a 14th-century Serbian Orthodox church located in the village, called the White Church.

== History ==
The village was established in the area of an earlier Roman settlement called Malvestatium.

The White Church in Karan was built in 1332 by local župan Petar Brajan, as a family funeral church. The church was erected on site of an older temple from 10th century, mentioned in charter edited by Byzantine Emperor Basil II in 1020. Inside there are portraits of Brajan and his family and of the Serbian Emperor Stefan Dušan.

== Notable residents ==
- Nikola Ljubičić (Serbian Cyrillic: Никола Љубичић; 4 April 1916 – 13 April 2005), Yugoslav Partisan and the President of the Presidency of Serbia (1982–1984) and the Minister of Defence of Yugoslavia (1967–1982). Recipient of the Order of the National Hero of Yugoslavia among other awards.

== See also ==
- White Church, Karan
- List of places in Serbia
