= Milan Blagojević Španac =

Serbian-Spanish communist and partisan; national hero of Yugoslavia

Milan Blagojević
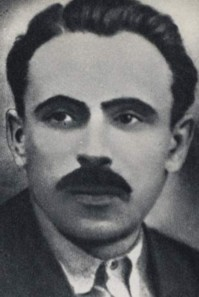
- Born: October 14, 1905; Natalinci, Kingdom of Serbia
- Died: October 28, 1941 (aged 36); Užička Požega, German-occupied Serbia
- Military career
- Allegiance: (Second Spanish Republic) Spanish Republican Army (Democratic Federal Yugoslavia) Yugoslav Partisans
- Nickname: Španac
- Conflicts: Spanish Civil War; World War II: Yugoslav People's Liberation War (KIA)
- Awards: Order of the People's Hero

Milan Blagojević (Serbian Cyrillic: Милан Благојевић; 14 October 1905 – 28/29 October 1941), better known as Španac (Serbian Cyrillic: Шпанац; transl. The Spaniard) was a Yugoslav partisan, Spanish-trained commando and republican volunteer in the Spanish Civil War and is credited for initiating the anti-fascist struggle in Yugoslavia during World War II. Partisan commander Milan Blagojević Španac was killed by the Chetniks in October 1941 in Požega.

== See also ==
- Milan Blagojević - Namenska
- Blagojević (family name)
- List of military headstamps – Yugoslavia
- Yugoslav volunteers in the Spanish Civil War
