= Vučko Ignjatović =

Serbian military officer

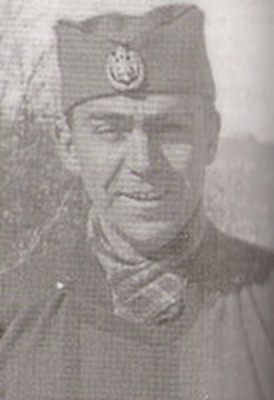
- Born: 1909; Valjevo, Kingdom of Serbia
- Died: 26 June 1942 (aged 32–33); Nova Varoš, German-occupied Serbia
- Burial place: Valjevo New Cemetery
- Military career
- Allegiance: Kingdom of Yugoslavia; Chetniks; Government of National Salvation (1941–1942)
- Branch: Požega Chetnik detachment
- Rank: Captain
- Conflicts: World War II in Yugoslavia; Battle of Trešnjica; 1942 Montenegro offensive

Vučko Ignjatović (Serbian Cyrillic: Вучко Игњатовић; 1909 – 26 June 1942) was a Serbian officer of the Royal Yugoslav Army who was commander of the Požega Chetnik detachment during the Second World War in Yugoslavia.

During the initial phases of the uprising in Serbia in 1941, Chetniks and Partisans led joint operations against the German occupying forces but Ignjatović doubted the intentions of the Partisans. He believed them to be a paramilitary that wanted to take power through a Communist revolution. Establishing links with Milan Kalabić, Ignjatović was one of the first Chetnik officers to be legalized by allying with forces led by Milan Nedić.

As a legalized Chetnik commander, he led Požega Detachment in capture of Nova Varoš from Yugoslav Partisans in early February 1942, alongside members of Serbian Volunteer Corps. After takeover of the town on February 6, Chetniks freed Italian soldiers captured by Partisans. After Ignjatović's commanding officer Miloš Glišić was appointed by Nedić as commander of Sandžak Military Chetnik detachment, some members of Požega Chetnik Detachment stayed in Nova Varoš and Ignjatović had an office in the town, remaining under Glišić's command. Ignjatović's troops were mostly garrisoned inside the city, whereas Sandžak detachment was located in the countryside. Ignjatović and Glišić complained to Nedić in a letter on May 1 how Italians and Germans are constantly spying on them, as well as their dissatisfaction with return of Nova Varoš to Italians, as they saw it as first step towards unification of Serbia, Montenegro and Sandžak. Ignjatović was killed by pro-Ljotić members of the Sandžak Military Chetnik detachment in Nova Varoš in the early hours of June 26, 1942.

== Sources ==
- Živković, Milutin (2017). Санџак 1941-1943 [Sanžak 1941-1943] (in Serbo-Croatian). Belgrade: University of Belgrade.
