= Unka =

Unka may refer to:

- Unka, Brod, a village in Bosnia and Herzegovina
- Vasanti Unka, writer and illustrator
- Unka (cricket), a genus of insect in subfamily Podoscirtinae

== See also ==
- Yunka (disambiguation)
- UNCA (disambiguation)
- Uncas (disambiguation)
