= Brusnik =

Brusnik is a Slavic toponym, derived from brus, meaning whetstone, or brusnica, meaning "cranberry" or "cowberry". It may refer to:

== Bulgaria ==
- Brusnik, Bulgaria, a village in Pernik Province

== Croatia ==
- Brusnik (island), a volcanic island in the Adriatic Sea
- Brusnik, Croatia, a village in Pakrac
- Brusnik, a village in Srbac

== Kosovo ==
- Brusnik, Vučitrn, a village

== North Macedonia ==
- Brusnik, Bitola, a village
- Brusnik, Negotino, a village in Negotino Municipality

== Poland ==
- Bruśnik, a village in arnów County, Lesser Poland Voivodeship

== Serbia ==
- Brusnik, Ivanjica, a village
- Brusnik, Zaječar, a village

== Slovakia ==
- Brusník, a village and municipality in Banská Bystrica Region

== See also ==
- Brusnica (disambiguation)
