= Ukrina =

Ukrina Укрина
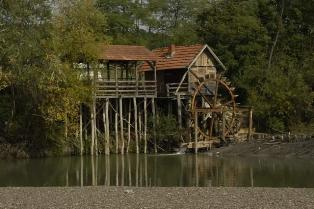
- Watermill on Ukrina

- Location within Bosnia and Herzegovina

Location
- Country: Bosnia and Herzegovina

Physical characteristics
- Source
  - location: Confluence of the Velika and Mala Ukrina rivers in Kulaši, Prnjavor
  - coordinates: 44.773290°N 17.752707°E
  - elevation: 1,590 m (5,220 ft)
- Mouth
  - location: Sava, near Brod
  - coordinates: 45.0889°N 17.9359°E
  - elevation: 268 m (879 ft)
- Length: 119.3 km (74.1 mi)
- Basin size: 1,504 km^{2} (581 mi^{2})

Basin features
- Progression: Sava→ Danube→ Black Sea
- Waterfalls: Several

Ukrina (Cyrillic: Укрина) is a river in the Central Bosnia, Bosnia and Herzegovina, right tributary of the river Sava. Its mouth is 3 km north from settlement Koraće and 10 km southwest of Brod.

Ukrina is produced by the merging of Mala Ukrina (Small Ukrina) and Velika Ukrina (Great Ukrina) in the village of Kulaši in the municipality of Prnjavor. The length of Ukrina of origin Great Ukrina (Lukavac) is 119.3 km, and the surface area of the basin is 1504 km².

== See also ==
- List of rivers of Bosnia and Herzegovina
- Derventa
- Bosanski Brod
