= Brusnica =

Brusnica (Serbian Cyrillic: Брусница) is a Slavic toponym, meaning "cranberry" (Vaccinium macrocarpon). It may refer to:

- Brusnica, Slovakia
- Brusnica, Lopare, Bosnia and Herzegovina
- Brusnica, Maglaj, Bosnia and Herzegovina
- Brusnica, Gornji Milanovac, Serbia
- Brusnica Velika, Bosnia and Herzegovina
- Brusnica Mala, Bosnia and Herzegovina

== See also ==
- Brusnik (disambiguation)
- Brusnice
