= Veldin Karić =

Croatian footballer and manager (born 1974)

Personal information
- Date of birth: 16 November 1974 (age 51)
- Place of birth: Slavonski Brod, SR Croatia, SFR Yugoslavia
- Height: 1.81 m (5 ft 11 in)
- Position: Forward

Youth career
- 1986–1989: Polet Bosanski Brod
- 1989–1991: Željezničar

Senior career*
Years	Team	Apps	(Gls)
1991–1992	Željezničar	22	(0)
1992–1993	Vojvodina	12	(2)
1993–1996	Marsonia	37	(15)
1996	Torino	23	(1)
1996–1997	Lugano	16	(5)
1997–2004	Varteks	134	(53)
2004–2005	Dinamo Zagreb	12	(4)
2005–2007	Inter Zaprešić	16	(6)
2007	Marsonia	7	(2)
2008	Oriolik		
2008–2009	Novalja	7	(1)
2009	Samobor	8	(2)
2009–2011	Marsonia		
2012	Drava Kuršanec		
2012	Ljutomer	9	(2)
2013–2018	Dinamo Apatija	57	(58)
2018–2019	Varteks		
2019–2020	Drava Kuršanec		

International career
1994–1995	Croatia U21	3	(1)
2001	Croatia B	1	(0)
2001–2003	Croatia	3	(0)

Managerial career
- 2011–2012: Drava Kuršanec
- * Club domestic league appearances and goals

Veldin Karić (born 16 November 1974) is a Croatian manager and former professional footballer. He played for a number of Croatian sides during his career but is mainly remembered for his time at Varteks (1997–2004) and a short spell with local powerhouse Dinamo Zagreb (2004–2005). During his career he also had stints with Torino in Italy and Lugano in Switzerland.

== Playing career ==
=== Club ===
Born in Slavonski Brod in present-day Croatia, Karić started playing football at nearby Bosanski Brod, a town across the river Sava in today's Bosnia and Herzegovina, coming from the village of Gornje Kolibe. He was brought to the club in 1986, alongside his cousins Edin Mujčin and Zemir Mujčin by coach Miroslav Buljan. As a youngster he was picked up by the Sarajevo-based Yugoslav First League club FK Željezničar, where he played at youth levels for two years before having his professional debut at 17 years of age, in the squad which featured the Croatian international Mario Stanić. He then signed a four-year contract with the club, but his career took an unpredictable turn due to the outbreak of the Bosnian War. According to Karić, he had been arrested at gunpoint by the JNA in 1992 and was taken to Pale, the Serbian stronghold during the Siege of Sarajevo, where he was delivered as a prisoner to Serbian paramilitary forces., believing he was to be executed. Karić claims that his coach at Željezničar Nenad Starovlah had personally intervened to save Karić from execution, but on the condition that he signed a two-year contract with Serbian club FK Vojvodina based in Novi Sad.

Karić then spent the following six months playing at Vojvodina. He was seen as a talented young forward and there was some interest from Serbian powerhouse FK Partizan to sign him, but the deal never materialised as Vojvodina turned down the offer. Karić later claimed that he tried to leave Serbia on a number of occasions, but that he finally succeeded in doing so only when he met a friend who was a police officer who agreed to help him cross the border to Croatia. Upon his return to Croatia, Karić started playing for his hometown club NK Marsonia, which was at the time playing in the Croatian Second Division, and soon established himself as one of Marsonia's key players, along with Edin Mujčin. The team managed to put on a string of good performances in the following years which saw them win promotion to Croatian First Division in the 1993–94 season, and then going on to finish 5th in their top flight debut in the 1994–95 season.

His good games at Marsonia attracted attention from clubs abroad and Karić then joined Serie A side Torino in the winter break of the 1995–96 season. However, his time at Torino was less successful as he failed to make an impact in his six months with the club, which was relegated from top flight at the end of the season. Following relegation, Karić was loaned out to FC Lugano in Switzerland.

In 1997 Karić returned to Croatia and was signed by Prva HNL club. During his time at Varteks he established himself as one of the club's key players and appeared in 134 league matches, scoring 53 league goals, in the period in which Varteks reached three Croatian Cup finals (1998, 2002 and 2004) and achieved their best-ever league result, finishing third in the 2002–03 Prva HNL season. However, the highlight of his seven-year spell at Varteks came in September 2001 when they surprisingly knocked out England's Aston Villa in the first round first leg of the 2001–02 UEFA Cup, with Saša Bjelanović scoring two goals and Karić adding a third in their 3–2 win at Villa Park. In the return leg in Varaždin, Aston Villa won 1–0 but Varteks progressed to second round on away goals rule, where they were knocked out by Brøndby 6–3 on aggregate.

In July 2004 Karić signed for Croatian powerhouse Dinamo Zagreb. Although he was initially given some playing time and he even scored a goal against Elfsborg in the first round of the 2004–05 UEFA Cup, he failed to make an impact at the club and finished the season with just 4 goals scored in 12 league appearances for the Blues. It proved to be their worst ever Prva HNL season as they finished 6th and failed to qualify for European competitions.

In July 2005 he was released by Dinamo and he signed for minnows Inter Zaprešić. This proved to be his last season of top-level football as the club finished bottom in the 2005–06 Prva HNL and was relegated. He stayed with the club for the following season as they won the 2006–07 Druga HNL title which would see them back in top flight, but was released by Inter in July 2007 before the following season kicked off. He then spent the next two years playing for several small clubs in Croatian lower levels before being released from third-level side NK Samobor in May 2009, after which he retired from active football.

As of May 2011 and the conclusion of the 2010–11 Prva HNL season, Karić is ranked as the 11th all-time top scorer in Prva HNL with 75 goals scored in Croatia's top level.

=== International ===
Karić was also capped for Croatia U21 in 1994–95 and later appeared in three full international matches for Croatia between 2001 and 2003, without scoring any goals. He was first called up by Otto Barić and played in two friendly games against South Korea in November 2001. In the first match played on 10 November in Seoul he came on as a substitute for Miljenko Mumlek, and in the second match played three days later in Gwangju he was named in the starting lineup but was substituted by Mladen Petrić. His third and final appearance came in February 2003 when he was called up by Mirko Jozić for a friendly against Macedonia played in Šibenik. Karić was named in the starting eleven but was substituted by Boško Balaban at half-time.

== Managerial career ==
In September 2011, Karić started his managerial career at the Croatian sixth tier side Drava Kuršanec. He was registered as a player for the club for the spring part of the season. He joined the Slovenian amateur side NK Ljutomer that summer, leaving the club in the winter period.

In the summer of 2013 he joined seventh-tier Dinamo Apatija, achieving promotion at the end of the season. His club emerged champions of their 6th tier league the following season, but weren't promoted, so Karić remained at that level for the 2015/2016 season.

In 2017, he played for Drava Kuršanec.

In 2018, he returned to play for the club founded in 2011 by fans, NK Varteks, which is not associated with the Varteks club, which folded in 2015, that he played for earlier in his career.
