= Bresnica =

Bresnica (Serbian Cyrillic: Бресница) is a Serbo-Croatian toponym. It may refer to:

- Bresnica, Croatia
- Bresnica, Bosilegrad, Serbia
- Bresnica, Čačak, Serbia
- Bresnica, Koceljeva, Serbia
- Bresnica, Vranje, Serbia
- Bresnica, Zvečan, Kosovo
- Bresnica, Slovenia

== See also ==
- Breznica (disambiguation)
- Brusnica (disambiguation)
