= Gornja Močila =

Gornja Močila may refer to:

- Gornja Močila, Bosnia and Herzegovina, a village near Brod
- Gornja Močila, Croatia, a village near Rakovica
