= Ante Prkačin =

Croatian politician, general and businessman

Member of Parliament
- In office 22 July 2020 – 16 May 2024
- Constituency: District VII
- In office 30 May 1990 – 27 January 2000

Personal details
- Born: 14 November 1953 (age 72) Slavonski Brod, PR Croatia, Yugoslavia
- Party: Homeland Movement (2020-2023)
- Other political affiliations: Croatian Christian Democratic Union/Croatian Democratic Party (1990–1991); New Croatia (1999–2000); Croatian Party of Rights (2011–2020); Hrvatsko bilo (2020–2024)
- Occupation: Politician

Military service
- Allegiance: Croatia (1991) Herzeg-Bosnia (1992–1995)
- Branch/service: Croatian Defence Forces; Croatian Defence Council
- Years of service: 1991–1995
- Rank: Brigadier General
- Unit: Croatian Defence Forces
- Commands: Croatian Defence Forces
- Battles/wars: Croatian War of Independence; Bosnian War

Ante Prkačin (born 14 November 1953) is a Croatian politician and businessman and a former general of the Croatian Army and the Croatian Defence Council.

== Biography ==
Prkačin was born in Slavonski Brod, where he also studied at the Faculty of Economics, in addition to the Faculty of Petrochemistry in Sisak.

In 1989, as a Croatian nationalist, he joined the christian democratic Croatian Democratic Party (Croatian: Hrvatska demokratska stranka) and won a seat in the first assembly of the Croatian Parliament in the 1990 elections, when his party was aligned with the Coalition of People's Accord.

In the late 1991, Prkačin moved to the Croatian Party of Rights. He soon became one of its representatives in Croatian Parliament, after the second Sabor election.

In 1992, when the war escalated in Bosnia and Herzegovina, Prkačin took part as a leader of the HSP militia Croatian Defence Forces (Hrvatske obrambene snage, HOS) with the rank of general, and had close co-operation with government of Alija Izetbegović. In the fall of the same year, he was a member of the joint command of Croatian Defence Council and Army of Bosnia and Herzegovina.

After HOS was disbanded, Prkačin was commander of the defence of Posavina as HVO officer.

Upon his return to Croatia, he began to distance himself from Dobroslav Paraga and spent the rest of his time in the Sabor as independent representative. He left HSP in 1995.

In October 1999, he founded a new party called New Croatia (Nova Hrvatska), and under its banner ran for Croatian President. In the first round of the 2000 Croatian presidential election he won just 0.28% of the vote, finishing 7th, and was eliminated.

Prkačin managed to remain in public spotlight by often appearing in various talk shows and being involved in Croatian entertainment industry. In 2001 he tried acting and played the role of a priest in a movie Slow Surrender.

In 2004, Prkačin was briefly in the public spotlight after two of his friends engaged in an urban gunfight in Slavonski Brod because of a conflict between him and Mladen Kruljac, another officer from the Croatian war.

In January 2009, Prkačin testified as a witness before a court in Sarajevo regarding the 1999 assassination of Jozo Leutar, the then-Minister of Internal Affairs of the Federation of Bosnia and Herzegovina. Three months later, Ante Jelavić said Prkačin had implicated him and accused him of being a former member of Yugoslav secret service KOS.

In August 2009, one Sakib Balić, a former HOS soldier, publicly accused Prkačin of commanding HOS units that participated in the Sijekovac killings, when numerous Serb civilians were killed in the village of Sijekovac near Bosanski Brod on 26 March 1992. The same accusation was echoed by one Ane Mihajlović, a veteran from the Army of Republika Srpska, at the event in May 2010 when Ivo Josipović and Sulejman Tihić visited the site to pay respect to around fifty civilian victims of the March 1992 events. Prkačin denied any connection to the killings in Sijekovac. The site and the visit provoked some controversy in the Croatian public, with allegations of impropriety levelled against President Josipović and the authorities of Republika Srpska.

In 2011 Prkačin returned to Croatian Party of Rights.

In the 2020 Croatian parliamentary election, he ran as a candidate on the Homeland Movement list and won a seat in the Sabor.
