= Prosjek, Prnjavor =

Prosjek
- Village
- Location within Republika Srpska Location within Bosnia and Herzegovina
- Coordinates: 44°53′41″N 17°28′02″E
- Country: Bosnia and Herzegovina
- Municipality: Prnjavor
- Time zone: UTC+1 (CET)
  - Summer (DST): UTC+2 (CEST)

Prosjek (Prnjavor) is a village in the municipality of Prnjavor Republika Srpska, Bosnia and Herzegovina.
