= Kokori (Prnjavor) =

Kokori Кокори
- Village
- Location within Bosnia and Herzegovina
- Coordinates: 44°48′51″N 17°29′13″E
- Country: Bosnia and Herzegovina
- Entity: Republika Srpska
- Municipality: Prnjavor
- Time zone: UTC+1 (CET)
  - Summer (DST): UTC+2 (CEST)

Kokori (Serbian: Кокори) is a village in the Republika Srpska, Bosnia and Herzegovina. According to the 1991 census, the village is located in the municipality of Prnjavor.
