= Prkačin =

Prkačin is a surname. Notable people with the surname include:

- Ante Prkačin (born 1953), Croatian and Bosnian general and politician
- Kristina Prkačin (born 1997), Croatian handball player
- Nikola Prkačin (born 1975), Croatian basketball player
- Roko Prkačin (born 2002), Croatian basketball player
