= Štivor =

Village in Bosnia and Herzegovina

Štivor Штивoр
- Village
- Location within Bosnia and Herzegovina
- Coordinates: 44°54′N 17°43′E
- Country: Bosnia and Herzegovina
- Entity: Republika Srpska
- Municipality: Prnjavor

Population (2013)
  - Total: 137
- Time zone: UTC+1 (CET)
  - Summer (DST): UTC+2 (CEST)

Štivor (Serbian: Штивoр) is a village near Prnjavor in the Republika Srpska entity of Bosnia and Herzegovina. The settlement is notable for its Italian community, the only still existing in BiH, originating from Trentino in northern Italy.

== History ==
Prior to Austro-Hungarian rule, the area was inhabited by Serbs and Bosniaks. Austria-Hungary occupied Bosnia and Herzegovina from 1878, and self-organized German colonist families arrived the next year in Bosanska Gradiška. In 1880 the provincial government concluded that prerequisites for colonization were not yet met. The German settlement and buying of land in villages of Gradiška and Prnjavor also led to the emigration of Bosniaks to Turkey and Serbs to Serbia. By the end of 1882, there were 1,343 foreign colonist families with 8,424 members in Bosnia-Herzegovina, mostly Germans and then Italians, who bought land for very low prices. The September–October 1882 floods of the Brenta river in South Tyrol was catastrophic for the agriculture, and resulted in the emigration of families of the region. Italians from around Trentino (demonym Trentini) in South Tyrol settled villages in Bosnian Posavina. The Trentini initially settled the begliks (bey lands) in Palačkovci in Prnjavor and then moved to Štivor when they received state-owned land there. The village of Štivor was established by the Palačkovci families in 1891–93, and it was settled and became a functioning village in 1894. The Trentini were mostly young couples with children. Their original villages in Trentino were Roncegno, Levico, Ospedaletto, Borgo and Scurelle (in the Sugana Valley, It. Valsugana). Among the surnames of the first Trentini settlers were Osti, Oberoster, Soteli, Fužinato, Dalsaso, Valendro, Andreata, Montibeler, Daltra, Marineli, Rover, Đuradeli. In the 1880s, 36 Muslim families opted to leave for Turkey due to conflict with the Italian settlers in Mahovljani. A Polish missionary visited the village at the end of the 19th century and noted that the community engaged and had proficiency in viticulture and masonry. Georgije Nikolajević (1807–1896), Metropolitan of Dabar-Bosna, visited the area in 1891 during the consecration of the Lepenica church near Prnjavor; he held a meeting in the Štivor woods.

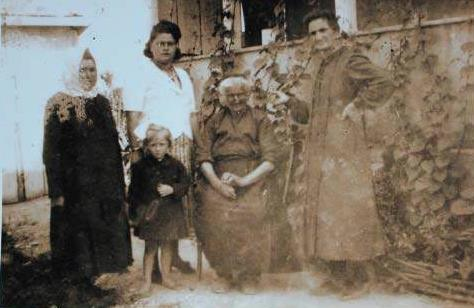
An Italian family in Štivor.

After the dissolution of Austro-Hungary in 1918, the Trentini community became citizens of the newly created Kingdom of Yugoslavia. A large part of the community emigrated in the Interwar period. In March 1939, Italy and Yugoslavia signed an agreement which gave the Italian minority in Yugoslavia the option to renounce Yugoslav citizenship and move to Italy. Most of Mihovljani opted for Italian citizenship but most in Štivor stayed. During World War II, Štivor was a site of Yugoslav Partisan operations. After the war, most families of Mahovljani moved to Italy. During Socialist Yugoslavia, the community was bilingual in their dialect and Serbo-Croatian, with many adopted loanwords of the latter. In the 1970s there were 80 Italian families in Štivor and 13 in Mahovljani. Eight of the families in Štivor were Serb-Italian mixed marriages. Their cuisine differed from their neighbours, with specialties such as lumasi (gastropoda) and gapa (frogs), and the formai Tyrolean cheese. Their dress did not differ from that of the neighbours. In 1973 an Italian monograph on their Trentino dialect was published.

Most of the Trentini community of Štivor has emigrated.

== Demographics ==
The village is inhabited by an Italian majority (the Trentini) and a Serb minority.

According to the 2013 census, there were 137 inhabitants, out of which 68 were Others, 57 were Serbs, 7 were Croats. The 1991 census registered 402 inhabitants: 294 Others, 58 Serbs, 16 Croats.

There is an Italian cultural organization in the village.

== See also ==
- List of populated places in Bosnia and Herzegovina

== Sources ==
- Drljača, Dušan (1985). Колонизација и живот Пољака у југословенским земљама: од краја XIX до половине XX века. Srpska akademija nauka i umetnosti, Etnografski institut.
- Drljača, Dušan (1971). Italiani in Bosnia.
- Cristaldi, Flavia (2013). "Dalle valli trentine alle colline bosniache: i segni recenti di un'antica emigrazione". Semestrale di studi e ricerche di geografia. 1.
- Stojinović, Jovana. "Штивор–италијанско село у Републици Српској." Филолог–часопис за језик, књижевност и културу 9 (2014): 313-321.
