= Schutzberg, Bosnia =

Village in Bosnia and Herzegovina

Coordinates: 44°52′12.8″N 17°46′45.7″E

Schutzberg (sometimes given as Glogowatz / Glogovac or Ukrinskilug) was a Germanophone settlement east of Prnjavor, Bosnia that lasted from 1895 to 1942.

== History ==
In 1872 Austria-Hungary occupied Bosnia and found that Prnjavor was sparsely populated. Efforts were undertaken to attract settlers from other parts of the empire and the area was consequently settled by Germans, Italians, Ukrainians, Slovaks, Poles and German speakers from Austria, Bohemia and Hungary. The municipality of Prnjavor was nicknamed "Little Europe."

The village of Schutzberg was founded in 1895 by a mixture of Danube Swabians and German settlers coming from Slavonia, Galicia, Bukowina, Hungary and Württemberg.

Although these colonists named their settlement Dornenberg (locally called Glogovac literally "thorn hill", presently called Grabovac ) and later Schutzberg (literally "protecting mountain"), it was also called Ukrinskilug and Glogowatz / Glogovac. They introduced modern farming methods and were very successful and prosperous. In 1918 Bosnia was annexed into Kingdom of Serbs, Croats and Slovenes and German immigration stopped.

Following the collapse of internal security during World War II the Nazis decided to evacuate the Volksdeutsche (ethnic German) population from Bosnia and a treaty to this effect was signed with the Croatian Ustaše regime on 30 September 1942. The Hauptamt Volksdeutsche Mittelstelle organised an SS commando from Belgrade, Serbia, under Otto Lackman and "...went from village to village, accompanied by the military."

By this stage Schutzberg was a relatively large rural settlement with a population of nearly 1300. In late 1942 all the Volksdeutsche were evacuated to Germany, never to return. The village was repopulated after 1945 with the Communist authorities destroyed or obscured all evidence of German history and heritage there.

== Literature ==
- Werner Conze, Hartmut Boockmann, Norbert Conrads und Günter Schödl: Deutsche Geschichte im Osten Europas, 10 Bde, ISBN 3-88680-771-1 (in German)
- Noel Malcolm, Bosnia: A Short History (1994) ISBN 0-330-41244-2
- Valdis O. Lumans, Himmler's Auxiliaries: The Volksdeutsche Mittelstelle and the German Minorities of Europe, 1939-1945 (1993) ISBN 0-8078-6564-8
