= Brusník =

Brusník Borosznok
- Municipality
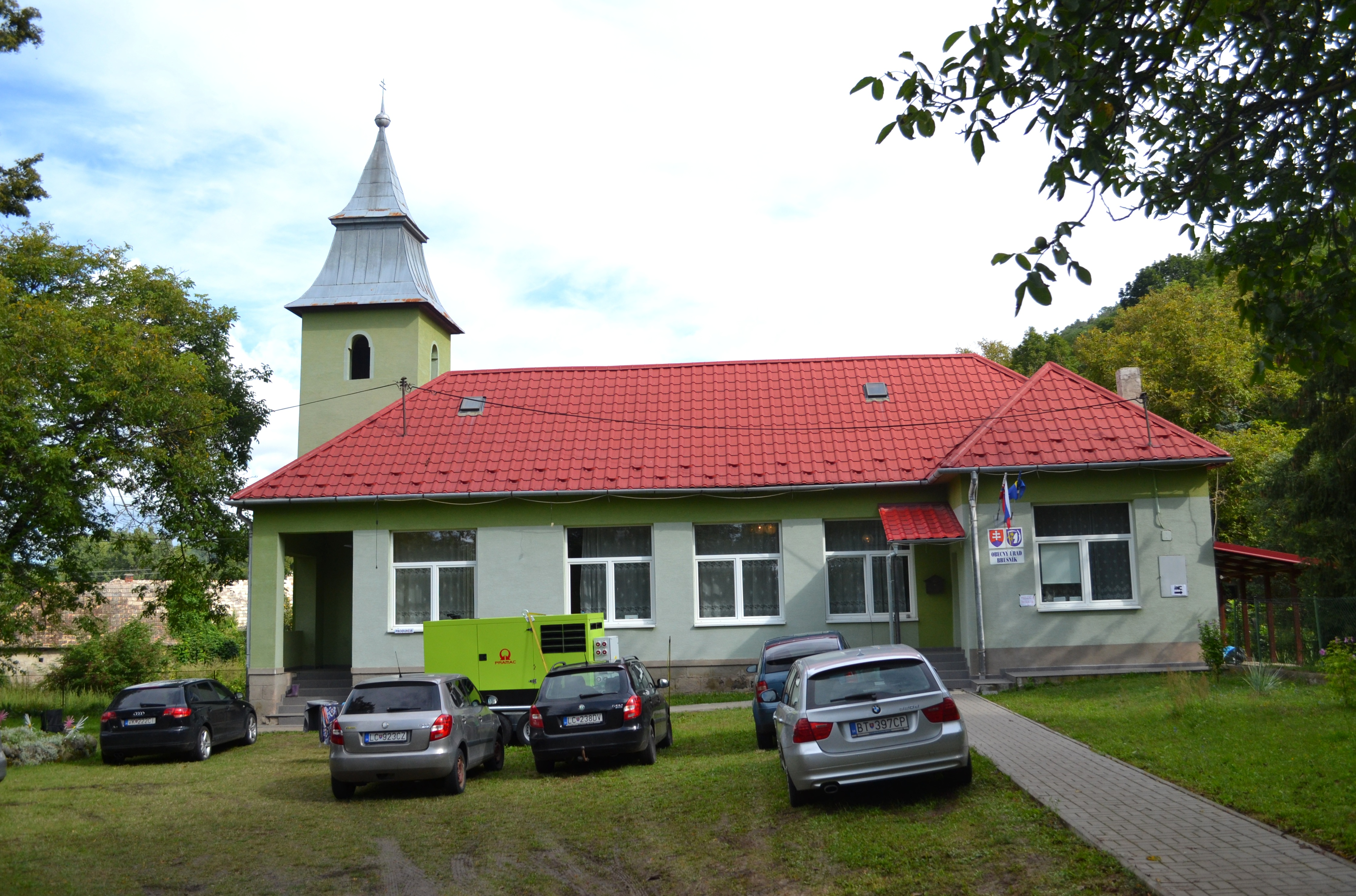

- Flag

- Location of Brusník in the Banská Bystrica Region Location of Brusník in Slovakia
- Coordinates: 48.30°N 19.40°E
- Country: Slovakia
- Region: Banská Bystrica Region
- District: Veľký Krtíš District
- First mentioned: 1327

Area
  - Total: 7.76 km^{2} (3.00 sq mi)
- Elevation: 235 m (771 ft)

Population (2025)
  - Total: 104
- Time zone: UTC+1 (CET)
  - Summer (DST): UTC+2 (CEST)
- Postal code: 991 01
- Area code: +421 47
- Vehicle registration plate (until 2022): VK
- Website: {{URL|example.com|optional display text}}

Brusník (Hungarian: Borosznok) is a village and municipality in the Veľký Krtíš District of the Banská Bystrica Region of southern Slovakia.

== Geography ==
The municipality lies at an altitude of 235 metres (771 ft) and covers an area of 7.76 km^{2} (3.00 sq mi) (2025).

== History ==
In historical records, the village was first mentioned in 1327 (Buusnuk) as belonging to Sečianky. After it passed to Divín castle.

== Genealogical resources ==
The records for genealogical research are available at the state archive "Statny Archiv in Banska Bystrica, Slovakia"

- Roman Catholic church records (births/marriages/deaths): 1811-1899 (parish B)
- Lutheran church records (births/marriages/deaths): 1747-1896 (parish B)

== Population ==
Population statistic (10 years)
Year	1995	2005	2015	2025
Count	101	86	118	104
Difference		−14.85%	+37.20%	−11.86%

Population statistic
Year	2024	2025
Count	107	104
Difference		−2.80%

It has a population of 104 people (31 December 2025).

=== Ethnicity ===
Census 2021 (1+ %)
Ethnicity	Number	Fraction
Slovak	113	99.12%
Total	114	

In year 2021 was 114 people by ethnicity 113 as Slovak and 1 as Not found out.

Note on population: The difference values of population numbers in the table "Population statistic" and in the sections "Ethnicity" & "Religion" is caused by the use of various statistical methods.

=== Religion ===
Census 2021 (1+ %)
Religion	Number	Fraction
Evangelical Church	55	48.25%
Roman Catholic Church	45	39.47%
None	13	11.4%
Total	114	

In year 2021 was 114 people by religion 55 from Evangelical Church, 45 from Roman Catholic Church, 13 from None and 1 from Paganism and natural spirituality.

== See also ==
- List of municipalities and towns in Slovakia
