= Sijekovac =

Sijekovac Сијековац
- Village
- Interactive map of Sijekovac
- Location within Bosnia and Herzegovina
- Coordinates: 45°07′00″N 17°58′42″E
- Country: Bosnia and Herzegovina
- Entity: Republika Srpska
- Municipality: Brod

Population (1991)
  - Total: 1,551
- Time zone: UTC+1 (CET)
  - Summer (DST): UTC+2 (CEST)

Sijekovac (Serbian Cyrillic: Сијековац) is a village in the municipality of Brod, Bosnia and Herzegovina. It is the location of Sijekovac killings that occurred before the beginning of the Bosnian War.
