= Donji Klakar =

Donji Klakar Доњи Клакар
- Village
- Location within Bosnia and Herzegovina
- Coordinates: 45°03′55″N 18°08′36″E
- Country: Bosnia and Herzegovina
- Entity: Republika Srpska
- Municipality: Brod
- Time zone: UTC+1 (CET)
  - Summer (DST): UTC+2 (CEST)

Donji Klakar (Serbian: Доњи Клакар) is a village in the municipality of Brod, Republika Srpska, Bosnia and Herzegovina.
