= Donje Kolibe =

Donje Kolibe Доње Колибе
- Village
- Location within Bosnia and Herzegovina
- Coordinates: 45°06′N 18°01′E
- Country: Bosnia and Herzegovina
- Entity: Republika Srpska
- Municipality: Brod
- Time zone: UTC+1 (CET)
  - Summer (DST): UTC+2 (CEST)

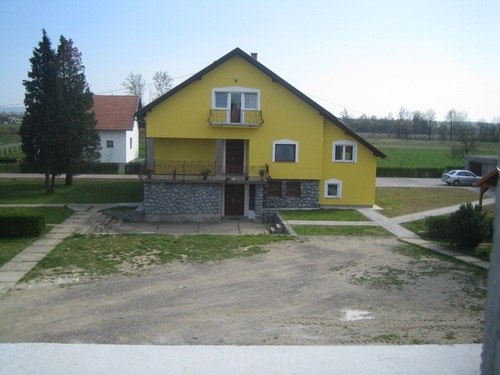
Renewed parish office, symbol of return.

Church after war.

Donje Kolibe (Serbian Cyrillic: Доње Колибе) or Kolibe Donje is a village in the municipality of Brod, Republika Srpska, Bosnia and Herzegovina. The settlement suffered great damage during the war, where it was almost completely destroyed. Most of the houses are still in ruins, and stay as a reminder of great destruction that took place. More than 12 years later, only a few houses were rebuilt. A new building stands on the place where the old church stood. Patron Saint of Parish Kolibe is Michael, who is celebrated on September 29. This is a day of reunion among people who once lived in the small village. A majority of inhabitants were ethnic Croats.
