= Gornja Barica =

Gornja Barica Горња Барица
- Village
- Location within Bosnia and Herzegovina
- Coordinates: 45°02′31″N 17°56′39″E
- Country: Bosnia and Herzegovina
- Entity: Republika Srpska
- Municipality: Brod
- Time zone: UTC+1 (CET)
  - Summer (DST): UTC+2 (CEST)

Gornja Barica (Serbian: Горња Барица) is a village in the municipality of Brod, Republika Srpska, Bosnia and Herzegovina.
