= Sijekovac massacre =

1992 killing of Serb civilians in Bosnia and Herzegovina

Coordinates: 45°7′0″N 17°58′42″E

- Location: Sijekovac, SR Bosnia and Herzegovina, Yugoslavia
- Date: 26 March 1992 and May 1992
- Target: Serbs and others
- Deaths: 9 or 11
- Perpetrators: members of the Croatian Defence Council’s 101st Bosanski Brod Brigade, Croatian Defence Forces and possibly others

On 26 March 1992, a number of Serb civilians were killed in Sijekovac near Bosanski Brod, Bosnia and Herzegovina and the Croatian border. The assailants were members of Croat and Bosniak army units. The exact number of casualties is unknown, but it is generally believed that between nine and eleven people were murdered at the time. The massacre is frequently cited as one of the very earliest documented atrocities of the Bosnian War.

Legal prosecution of the murders was lacking, with only one perpetrator having been apprehended and tried as of 2024. The Republika Srpska authorities commemorated a number of civilian victims on a monument in Sijekovac, not all of which were necessarily connected to the same massacre.

A 2004 exhumation unearthed 58 bodies of war victims, of whom 18 were children, but they are believed to have been connected to a separate massacre dated to May 1992.

== Background ==
The fighting in Posavina began on 3 March 1992, after the Serbian Democratic Party (SDS) declared a Serb municipality in Bosanski Brod, trying to take control away from Bosniaks and Croats. Serbian Territorial Defense forces set up barricades in the town and tried to seize the strategically important bridge linking the town with Croatia, prompting the local Croats and Muslims to form a joint headquarters, and to request assistance from the Croatian Army, based just across the border in Slavonski Brod. According to a local report, 200 shells fell on Bosanski Brod on the first day of the Serb attack. Neither side managed to prevail, and the Yugoslav People's Army (JNA) sent its 327th Motorized Brigade to the city. Following a ceasefire of several weeks the JNA and Serb militias once again attacked the town, launching a heavy artillery bombardment and sniper fire, and looting took place in the Croat quarter of the town.

The Croats retaliated by attacking the village of Sijekovac on the right side of the Sava River, across from Croatia. At the time, as the Bosnian War was starting, it was still populated by members of all three ethnic groups of Bosnia and Herzegovina.

== Massacre ==
On 26 March 1992, nine Serb civilians were killed after an attack on the village. Members of the Zečević, Milošević, Trifunović and Radić families were killed. The youngest victim was Dragan Milošević, who was turning 18. A large number of houses were set on fire, and the Church of the Virgin Mary was destroyed.

== Aftermath ==
Three members of the Presidency of Bosnia and Herzegovina arrived by helicopter within days, to investigate a reported "dozen killed civilians". The initial reported number of victims was eleven. The murders happened the week after the Lisbon Agreement was signed, one of the attempts to prevent Bosnian War, which nevertheless started in April 1992.

A Helsinki Watch report from August 1992 put it in context of exaggerated or falsified allegations by the Serbian side in the war, saying they could not find evidence to substantiate claims of excessive force based on interviews with Serb refugees from the village in mid-March. In November 1992, the Government of the Federal Republic of Yugoslavia listed a massacre of 12 people in Sijekovac in its report on the violations of humanitarian law pursuant to the United Nations Security Council Resolution 780.

== Legal proceedings ==
In May 2002, an evidence case was handed over to investigators from the ICTY. In 2006, that court transferred the case to the War Crimes Prosecutor's Office of Bosnia and Herzegovina. County Prosecutor's Office in Doboj indicted three members of what would become the Interventions Squad of the Croatian Defence Council’s 101st Bosanski Brod Brigade for crimes against Serb civilians in Sijekovac.

In December 2010, Sweden extradited Zemir Kovačević, a former HVO soldier who was a member of the Intervention Squad of the 1st Bosanski Brod Brigade, to Bosnia and Herzegovina, in order to face trial for two murders and abuse of civilians in March 1992, and pillaging homes in April the same year.

In 2012, Kovačević was formally charged by the Court of Bosnia and Herzegovina with crimes against Serb civilians in the village. The indictment alleged that Kovačević took part in an attack on the village and along with others, took 15 Serb adults and four children out of their houses and into yards, killing some of them. The court found that the initial attack on Sijekovac was preceded by a meeting of the local crisis committee whereupon it was declared that Serbs should hand over their weapons. Afterwards, uniformed militiamen appeared and Serbs were urged to surrender via megaphone. The attack on Serb-populated areas began sometime after 4 pm.

Saša Milosević, who was ten years old at the time, was one of the key witnesses at Kovačević's trial. Milosević described how he heard shooting and with his mother and younger brother went to hide in their neighbor's house while his elder brother and father stayed in the yard. The court found that a total of 19 civilians hid in the basement. Milosević stated that Croatian Army soldiers came and took them out of the basement, cursed at them and beat them and that he himself was threatened with a knife. He witnessed Kovačević shooting and killing three men, including one who was disabled. Milja Zečević, another witness at the trial, stated that her husband and three of her sons were also killed that day. During the trial, it was found that several Serb houses were set on fire and about 30 civilians, mostly women and children, were detained and physically and mentally abused.

During the trial, witnesses identified Nijaz Čaušević, a member of the Croatian Defence Council 101st Brigade’s Interventions Squad, as having participated in the attack on civilians. In 2011, the District Public Prosecution in the city of Doboj filed an indictment accusing Čaušević of war crimes but no progress had been made with Croatian authorities. The court found that Croatian Defence Forces members were led by Ante Prkačin on the day of the atrocities; he was also identified by one of the witnesses. Prkačin denied committing crimes when interviewed by reporters in 2020. The trial against Kovačević concluded in May 2014 and the Court of Bosnia and Herzegovina found him guilty of the murder of two civilians, mistreatment of civilians and pillaging of Serb houses and sentenced him to ten years in prison. The sentence was upheld by an appeals court in May 2015.

== Later events ==
According to recent reports in Večernje novosti, Sijekovac and the surroundings of Bosanski Brod were the site of crimes throughout 1992 until autumn. There were several large and smaller camps where local Serbs were detained and subjected to rape and beatings.

It is unclear how many civilians were killed or died in Sijekovac and the area of Bosanski Brod. The authorities of Republika Srpska marked the site with a monument listing 47 casualties.

In May 2010, the leaders of Republika Srpska (Rajko Kuzmanović and Milorad Dodik), the Croatian president (Ivo Josipović) and a prominent Bosniak leader (Sulejman Tihić) all visited the site to pay respect to civilian victims of the March 1992 events, at the local Orthodox Church of Saint Marina the Martyr. The HINA coverage of the event included a statement from Marko Grabovac, the president of a local NGO, saying 9 people were killed on 26 March, 21 people were killed on 27 and 28 March, and overall there were over fifty deaths. The site and the visit provoked some controversy in Croatia, with allegations of impropriety levelled against President Josipović and the authorities of Republika Srpska for misattributing some of the casualties on the monument.

In 2004, the judge of the Zenica-Doboj Court and member of the FBiH Commission for Tracing Missing persons, Enisa Adrović, noted that exhumations which had taken 14 days recovered 58 corpses and was done under the supervision of Federation Commission for Missing Persons. The victims were mostly Serb civilians. The first 8 bodies found had personal objects (clothing, a belt, buttons, glasses), yet the remaining 49 [sic] bodies had no objects that could help in their identification. Among them there were 18 bodies of children. The victims were believed to have been killed in the period between April and November 1992.

Several exhumation officials initially told Nezavisne novine about various suspicions of the origin of the victims, including a member of the Republika Srpska Office for Missing Persons and the District Prosecutor of Doboj, Slavko Krulj, who referenced claims from the Veritas Information Center, an NGO run by Savo Štrbac. Štrbac claimed the number of children found seemed to vastly exceed the number of children actually reported as missing from Sijekovac. Tomo Aračić, president of Udruženje '92, the organization that initiated the exhumation in the first place, said that they had no actual information about any foreign children at Sijekovac. The presiding officer of the FBiH Commission for Missing Persons, Marko Jurišić, claimed the identities of the majority of the bodies were unknown and that only analysis by forensic experts could determine such details. No representatives from the Republic of Croatia's Office for Missing Persons were present at the exhumation.

In 2008, Glas Srpske published an article saying there were 59 bodies found in the 2004 exhumation, and that their deaths were dated to the time of the Bosnian War. Furthermore, they believed that these were Roma people who died in May 1992. However, they were unable to get information about prosecution from the State Public Prosecutor's Office of Bosnia and Herzegovina, the Cantonal Public Prosecutor's Office of the Zenica-Doboj Canton or the County Public Prosecutor's Office in Doboj.

In July 2016, Serbian news outlet Blic published alleged 1992 documents allowing members of Croat units to sexually abuse imprisoned Serb women, signed by a local commander Ahmet Čaušević. Their inquiry with the Bosnia and Herzegovina's Prosecutor's Office at the time resulted in a vague statement of investigation being in progress.

In 2017, the director of the Republika Srpska Center for Research on War, War Crimes and Search for Missing Persons Milorad Kojić told the Srna news agency that the crime in Sijekovac is still not punished, because the only punishment was the sentence imposed on Zemir Kovačević.

In 2020, the Centre for the Investigation of War Crimes in Republika Srpska alleged that the factions who participated in the attack were regular Croatian Army (HVO) forces, Croatian National Guard (ZNG) members and Croatian Defence Forces paramilitaries. They also claimed that 11 additional civilians were killed in a subsequent attack.

In 2024, Večernje novosti published an article interviewing writer Stevo Grabovac who talked about twenty Roma children killed in May 1992, and historian Georgije Vulić who talked about nine Serbs killed on 26 March 1992. The article also noted a variety of rumors about Nijaz Čaušević, who was known to have been in Croatia since the 2000s. In 2022, Čaušević had been reported missing in Croatia.

== Bibliography ==
- Central Intelligence Agency, Office of Russian and European Analysis (2002). Balkan Battlegrounds: A Military History of the Yugoslav Conflict, 1990–1995. Washington, D.C.: Central Intelligence Agency. OCLC 50396958.
