= Liješće (Brod) =

Liješće Лијешће
- Village
- Location within Bosnia and Herzegovina
- Coordinates: 45°04′59″N 18°05′02″E
- Country: Bosnia and Herzegovina
- Entity: Republika Srpska
- Municipality: Brod
- Time zone: UTC+1 (CET)
  - Summer (DST): UTC+2 (CEST)

Liješće (Serbian: Лијешће) is a village in the municipality of Brod, Republika Srpska, Bosnia and Herzegovina. This village is about 400 years old. About 2000 people live there. The most famous families in the Liješće are Jelić and Šukurma.
