= Kričanovo =

Kričanovo Кричаново
- Village
- Location within Bosnia and Herzegovina
- Coordinates: 45°06′37″N 18°01′07″E
- Country: Bosnia and Herzegovina
- Republic: Republika Srpska
- Municipality: Brod
- Time zone: UTC+1 (CET)
  - Summer (DST): UTC+2 (CEST)

Kričanovo (Serbian: Кричаново) is a village in the municipality of Brod, Republika Srpska, Bosnia and Herzegovina.
