= Sead Mašić =

Bosnian footballer

Personal information
- Full name: Sead Mašić
- Date of birth: 10 May 1959 (age 67)
- Place of birth: Bosanski Brod, FPR Yugoslavia
- Height: 1.85 m (6 ft 1 in)
- Position: Defender

Youth career
- 1971–1976: Premijum Bosanski Brod
- 1976–1979: Partizan

Senior career*
Years	Team	Apps	(Gls)
1979–1985	Partizan	48	(0)
1985	Dinamo Vinkovci	11	(0)
1985–1987	Trepča	46	(2)
1987–1989	Canet 66	39	(1)
1989–1991	Le Puy	57	(5)
1991–1992	Angoulême	3	(0)
Total		204	(8)
- * Club domestic league appearances and goals

Sead Mašić (born 10 May 1959) is a Bosnian retired professional footballer.

== Club career ==
Mašić was born in Bosanski Brod, Bosnia and Herzegovina. He played with FK Partizan between 1979 and 1985. Playing as central defender, he played a total of 264 games and scored 14 goals with Partizan, 48 of which in the Yugoslav First League. With Partizan Mašić won national Championship in 1983. In 1984, he moved to another top league club, NK Dinamo Vinkovci, and a year later he moved to KF Trepça and played two seasons in the Yugoslav Second League. In 1987, he moved abroad to France and played in the 3. Division with FC Canet 66, Le Puy Foot 43 and Angoulême.

He resides in Orange, France.
