= Kruščik =

Kruščik Крушчик
- Village
- Location within Bosnia and Herzegovina
- Coordinates: 45°01′49″N 18°01′41″E
- Country: Bosnia and Herzegovina
- Entity: Republika Srpska
- Municipality: Brod
- Time zone: UTC+1 (CET)
  - Summer (DST): UTC+2 (CEST)

Kruščik (Serbian: Крушчик) is a village in the municipality of Brod, Republika Srpska, Bosnia and Herzegovina.
