= Gornja Vrela =

Gornja Vrela Горња Врела
- Village
- Location within Bosnia and Herzegovina
- Coordinates: 45°01′05″N 18°06′47″E
- Country: Bosnia and Herzegovina
- Entity: Republika Srpska
- Municipality: Brod
- Time zone: UTC+1 (CET)
  - Summer (DST): UTC+2 (CEST)

Gornja Vrela (Serbian: Горња Врела) is a village in the municipality of Brod, Republika Srpska, Bosnia and Herzegovina.
