= Uncas (disambiguation) =

Uncas was a 17th-century Mohegan sachem.

Uncas may also refer to:

- Uncas, a character in the novel The Last of the Mohicans
- Uncas (boat), the first steamship to pass through the Portland Canal
- USS Uncas, numerous ships of the U.S. Navy

== See also ==
- UNCA (disambiguation)
