= Koraće =

Koraće Кораће
- Village
- Location within Bosnia and Herzegovina
- Coordinates: 45°03′47″N 17°56′05″E
- Country: Bosnia and Herzegovina
- Municipality: Brod
- Time zone: UTC+1 (CET)
  - Summer (DST): UTC+2 (CEST)

Koraće (Cyrillic: Кораће) is a village in the municipality of Brod, Republika Srpska, Bosnia and Herzegovina.
