= Gornje Kolibe =

Gornje Kolibe Горње Колибе
- Village
- Location within Bosnia and Herzegovina
- Coordinates: 45°05′N 18°02′E
- Country: Bosnia and Herzegovina
- Entity: Republika Srpska
- Municipality: Brod
- Time zone: UTC+1 (CET)
  - Summer (DST): UTC+2 (CEST)

Gornje Kolibe (Serbian: Горње Колибе) is a village in the municipality of Brod, Republika Srpska, Bosnia and Herzegovina with Bosniak ethnic majority.
