= Brusnica Mala =

- Village
- Location within Bosnia and Herzegovina
- Coordinates: 45°04′24″N 18°13′07″E
- Country: Bosnia and Herzegovina
- Entity: Federation of Bosnia and Herzegovina; Republika Srpska
- Canton Region: Posavina; Doboj
- Municipality: Odžak; Brod

Area
  - Total: 3.50 sq mi (9.06 km^{2})

Population (2013)
  - Total: 124
  - Density: 35.4/sq mi (13.7/km^{2})
- Time zone: UTC+1 (CET)
  - Summer (DST): UTC+2 (CEST)

Brusnica Mala (Serbian: Брусница Мала) is a village in the municipalities of Odžak, Federation of Bosnia and Herzegovina and Brod, Republika Srpska, Bosnia and Herzegovina.

== Demographics ==
According to the 2013 census, its population was 124, with 102 living in the Odžak part and 22 in the Brod part.

Ethnicity in 2013
Ethnicity	Number	Percentage
Serbs	120	96.8%
Croats	2	1.6%
other/undeclared	2	1.6%
Total	124	100%
