= Gornja Močila, Bosnia and Herzegovina =

Gornja Močila Горња Мочила
- Village
- Location within Bosnia and Herzegovina
- Coordinates: 45°06′12″N 17°57′42″E
- Country: Bosnia and Herzegovina
- Entity: Republika Srpska
- Municipality: Brod
- Time zone: UTC+1 (CET)
  - Summer (DST): UTC+2 (CEST)

Gornja Močila (Serbian: Горња Мочила) is a village in the municipality of Brod, Republika Srpska, Bosnia and Herzegovina.
