= Sečianky =

Municipality of Slovakia

Sečianky Ipolyszécsényke
- Municipality
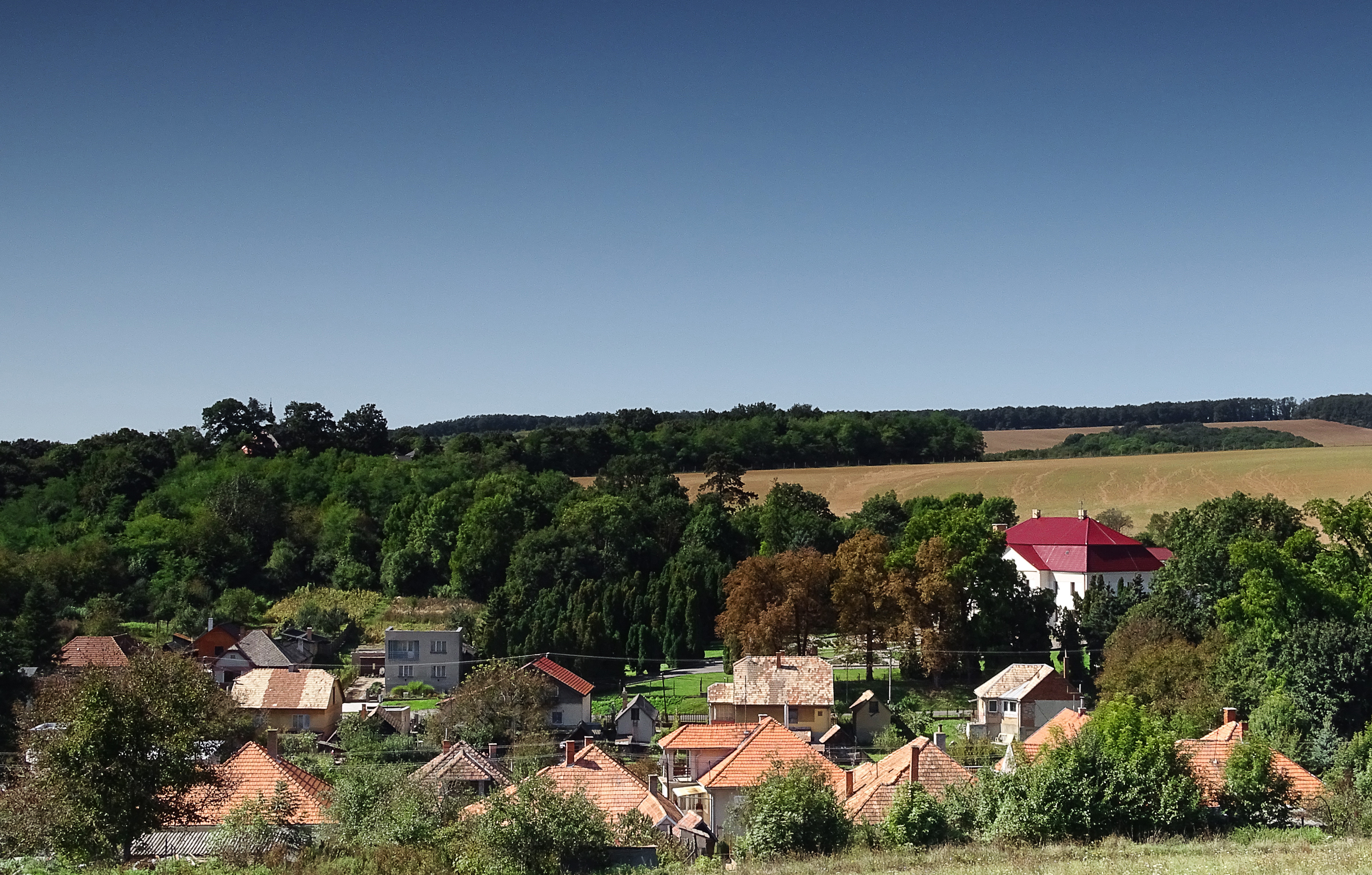

- Flag

- Location of Sečianky in the Banská Bystrica Region Location of Sečianky in Slovakia
- Coordinates: 48.10°N 19.08°E
- Country: Slovakia
- Region: Banská Bystrica Region
- District: Veľký Krtíš District
- First mentioned: 1260

Area
  - Total: 7.85 km^{2} (3.03 sq mi)
- Elevation: 166 m (545 ft)

Population (2025)
  - Total: 327
- Time zone: UTC+1 (CET)
  - Summer (DST): UTC+2 (CEST)
- Postal code: 991 10
- Area code: +421 47
- Vehicle registration plate (until 2022): VK
- Website: www.secianky.sk

Sečianky (Hungarian: Ipolyszécsényke) is a village and municipality in the Veľký Krtíš District of the Banská Bystrica Region of southern Slovakia.

== Geography ==
The municipality lies at an altitude of 166 metres (545 ft) and covers an area of 7.85 km^{2} (3.03 sq mi) (2025).

== Population ==
Population statistic (10 years)
Year	1995	2005	2015	2025
Count	447	410	371	327
Difference		−8.27%	−9.51%	−11.85%

Population statistic
Year	2024	2025
Count	333	327
Difference		−1.80%

It has a population of 327 people (31 December 2025).

=== Ethnicity ===
Census 2021 (1+ %)
Ethnicity	Number	Fraction
Hungarian	255	76.11%
Slovak	86	25.67%
Not found out	10	2.98%
Romani	6	1.79%
Total	335	

In year 2021 was 335 people by ethnicity 255 as Hungarian, 86 as Slovak, 10 as Not found out, 6 as Romani and 2 as Czech.

Note on population: The difference values of population numbers in the table "Population statistic" and in the sections "Ethnicity" & "Religion" is caused by the use of various statistical methods.

=== Religion ===
Census 2021 (1+ %)
Religion	Number	Fraction
Roman Catholic Church	285	85.07%
None	24	7.16%
Not found out	9	2.69%
Greek Catholic Church	7	2.09%
Christian Congregations in Slovakia	6	1.79%
Total	335	

In year 2021 was 335 people by religion 285 from Roman Catholic Church, 24 from None, 9 from Not found out, 7 from Greek Catholic Church, 6 from Christian Congregations in Slovakia, 2 from Evangelical Church, 1 from Other and not ascertained christian church and 1 from Buddhism.
