= Bresnica, Zvečan =

Bresnica Breznicë
- Village
- Location within Kosovo
- Location: Kosovo
- District: Mitrovicë
- Municipality: Zveçan

Population (2011)
  - Total: 145
- Time zone: UTC+1 (CET)
  - Summer (DST): UTC+2 (CEST)

Bresnica (Serbian Cyrillic: Бресница) or Breznicë (Albanian definite form: Breznica), is a village in the municipality of Zvečan, in northern Kosovo. It is inhabited by Serbs, located in Serb-majority North Kosovo. According to the 2011 census, it had a population of 145 people. It was mentioned in the 1455 defter (Ottoman tax registry) as Brusnica (Serbian Cyrillic: Брусница). There are ruins of an old church and an old graveyard above the hamlet of Krst.
