= UNCA =

UNCA may refer to:

- United Nations Correspondents Association
- University of North Carolina at Asheville

== See also ==
- Uncas (disambiguation)
