= Brusnica Velika =

Brusnica Velika Брусница Велика
- Village
- Location within Bosnia and Herzegovina
- Coordinates: 45°04′N 18°11′E
- Country: Bosnia and Herzegovina
- Entity: Republika Srpska
- Municipality: Brod
- Time zone: UTC+1 (CET)
  - Summer (DST): UTC+2 (CEST)

Brusnica Velika (Serbian: Брусница Велика) is a village in the municipality of Brod, Republika Srpska, Bosnia and Herzegovina.
