= Jozo Leutar =

Deputy Minister of Internal Affairs of the Federation of BiH
- In office 1994 – March 28, 1999
- Prime Minister: Edhem Bičakčić
- Succeeded by: Ivan Baćak

Deputy Minister of Internal Affairs of Herceg-Bosna
- In office 1993–1996
- Prime Minister: Jadranko Prlić

Deputy in the House of Representatives of the Parliamentary Assembly of BiH
- In office November 26, 1998 – March 28, 1999
- Succeeded by: Ljubomir Zovko

Personal details
- Born: 23 September 1953 Livno, SR Bosnia and Herzegovina, SFR Yugoslavia
- Died: March 28, 1999 (aged 45) Sarajevo, Bosnia and Herzegovina
- Manner of death: Assassination
- Party: HDZ BiH
- Education: Faculty of Political Sciences in Sarajevo; Faculty of Criminology in Zagreb
- Profession: Criminologist, political scientist

Jozo Leutar (23 September 1953 – 28 March 1999) was a high-ranking Bosnian Croat politician and police official in Bosnia and Herzegovina. At the time of his death, he held one of the state's key security posts: Deputy Minister (Dominister) of Internal Affairs of the Federation of Bosnia and Herzegovina.

He died from injuries sustained in a car bomb assassination carried out on 16 March 1999 in Sarajevo. The Leutar case represents one of the most significant unsolved political assassinations in post-Dayton Bosnian history, which was judicially confirmed as a systemic failure by the Constitutional Court of BiH in 2021.

== Biography ==
Jozo Leutar was born on 23 September 1953 in Livno. He completed primary school in Tomislavgrad and Secondary Police School in Sarajevo. He later graduated from the Faculty of Criminology in Zagreb and obtained a degree in Political Sciences from the Faculty of Political Sciences in Sarajevo. He was professionally a criminologist and a political scientist.

His police career began as a traffic police officer, and he later worked in the State Security Service (SDS). By 1992, he served as the Chief of Criminal Police in Sarajevo.

In 1992, he joined the HDZ BiH party. During the war, in 1993, he became Deputy Minister of Police within the structures of the Croatian Republic of Herzeg-Bosnia. Following the signing of the Washington Agreement and the formation of the Federation of BiH, Leutar was appointed Deputy Minister of Internal Affairs (MUP) of the Federation of Bosnia and Herzegovina in 1994. He held this position until his death in 1999. He also served as a Deputy in the House of Representatives of the Parliamentary Assembly of BiH from November 1998 until his death.

== Death ==
On the morning of 16 March 1999, around 7:50 a.m., Leutar was being driven to work in his official VW Golf vehicle. While driving through the Sarajevo neighborhood of Ciglane, a car bomb that had been placed underneath his vehicle was activated. Leutar's chauffeur, Željko Ćosić, survived with minor injuries. Leutar suffered severe, life-threatening injuries, primarily to his head.

He was transferred to the University Clinical Center Sarajevo (Koševo Hospital) but never regained consciousness. He died 12 days later, on 28 March 1999.

=== Theories ===
As of 2025, the masterminds and perpetrators of the assassination have not been lawfully convicted. Due to Leutar's high security position, several unconfirmed theories regarding the motives have emerged in the public sphere:

- Conflict with Organized Crime: According to media reports, this was a primary line of investigation. Leutar was allegedly working on investigations involving high-level corruption, illegal trade (especially in oil), and financial crime. It was suspected that his actions threatened powerful criminal clans with political ties.
- Internal Political Conflict: Another theory, often expressed by Leutar's family, focused on internal political struggles. Leutar belonged to a moderate faction of the HDZ BiH advocating for the strengthening of Federation institutions. It was suspected that the assassination resulted from a conflict with more radical factions within the HDZ and Herzeg-Bosna, who opposed Leutar's efforts towards police integration. The family repeatedly voiced suspicions that the masterminds came "from the political or security elite of the time."
- Involvement of Foreign Services: A third, less frequently mentioned theory suggested the involvement of foreign intelligence services whose goal was the destabilization of the Federation of BiH during the sensitive post-Dayton period.

=== Investigation and court process ===
The assassination caused significant political turmoil. The investigation involved domestic police agencies, as well as international actors such as the IPTF and the American FBI.

==== Controversial Judicial Proceeding (2001–2002) ====
The investigation led by the Cantonal Prosecutor's Office in Sarajevo resulted in the indictment of six ethnic Croats (Ivan Andabak, Dominik Ilijašević, Zoran Bašić, Željko Ćosić, Mario Miličević, and Jadranko Bajkuša) for terrorism and the murder of Leutar. This legal process was interpreted by the public as an attempt to attribute responsibility to "Croat extremists."

The entire indictment heavily relied on the testimony of protected witness Merim Galijatović. During the trial, the Cantonal Court in Sarajevo fully dismissed Galijatović's testimony as unreliable, contradictory, and false. The six accused persons were acquitted (in 2001 and 2002), a verdict later confirmed by the Supreme Court of the FBiH.

This failed judicial process led to a widespread belief, shared by Leutar's family, that the investigation was deliberately directed away from the actual perpetrators and masterminds.

==== Constitutional Court Decision (2021) ====
Due to the complete lack of progress in the investigation, Jozo Leutar's son Ivica filed an appeal with the Constitutional Court of Bosnia and Herzegovina.

In October 2021, the Constitutional Court ruled that the authorities (the Cantonal Prosecutor's Office and the Prosecutor's Office of BiH) had violated Leutar's "right to life" (Article 2 of the European Convention on Human Rights). The Court determined that the investigation was ineffective, unacceptably lengthy, and that the reasons cited for the delays were insufficient. This decision ordered the Prosecutor's Office of BiH to take over the case and conduct an effective investigation "without further delay," confirming the systemic failure to resolve the assassination from the highest judicial authority.
