= Brusnik, Ivanjica =

Brusnik Брусник
- Village
- Location within Serbia
- Coordinates: 43°21′50″N 20°20′58″E
- Country: Serbia
- District: Moravica District
- Municipality: Ivanjica

Area
  - Total: 52.70 km^{2} (20.35 sq mi)

Population (2011)
  - Total: 353
  - Density: 6.70/km^{2} (17.3/sq mi)
- Time zone: UTC+1 (CET)
  - Summer (DST): UTC+2 (CEST)

Brusnik is a village in the municipality of Ivanjica, Serbia. According to the 2011 census, the village has a population of 353 inhabitants.
