= Brusnica, Lopare =

Brusnica
- Village
- Location within Bosnia and Herzegovina
- Coordinates: 44.688059°N 18.7857627°E
- Country: Bosnia and Herzegovina
- Entity: Republika Srpska; Federation of Bosnia and Herzegovina
- Region Canton: Bijeljina; Tuzla
- Municipality: Lopare; Čelić

Area
  - Total: 3.31 sq mi (8.57 km^{2})

Population (2013)
  - Total: 382
  - Density: 115/sq mi (44.6/km^{2})
- Time zone: UTC+1 (CET)
  - Summer (DST): UTC+2 (CEST)

Brusnica is a village in the municipalities of Lopare (Republika Srpska) and Čelić, Tuzla Canton, Bosnia and Herzegovina.

== Demographics ==
According to the 2013 census, its population was 382, all of them living in the Lopare part, thus none in Čelić.

Ethnicity in 2013
Ethnicity	Number	Percentage
Serbs	378	99.0%
Bosniaks	2	0.5%
other/undeclared	2	0.5%
Total	382	100%
