= Prnjavor, Bosnia and Herzegovina =

Prnjavor Прњавор (Serbian)
- City
- Grad Prnjavor; Град Прњавор; City of Prnjavor
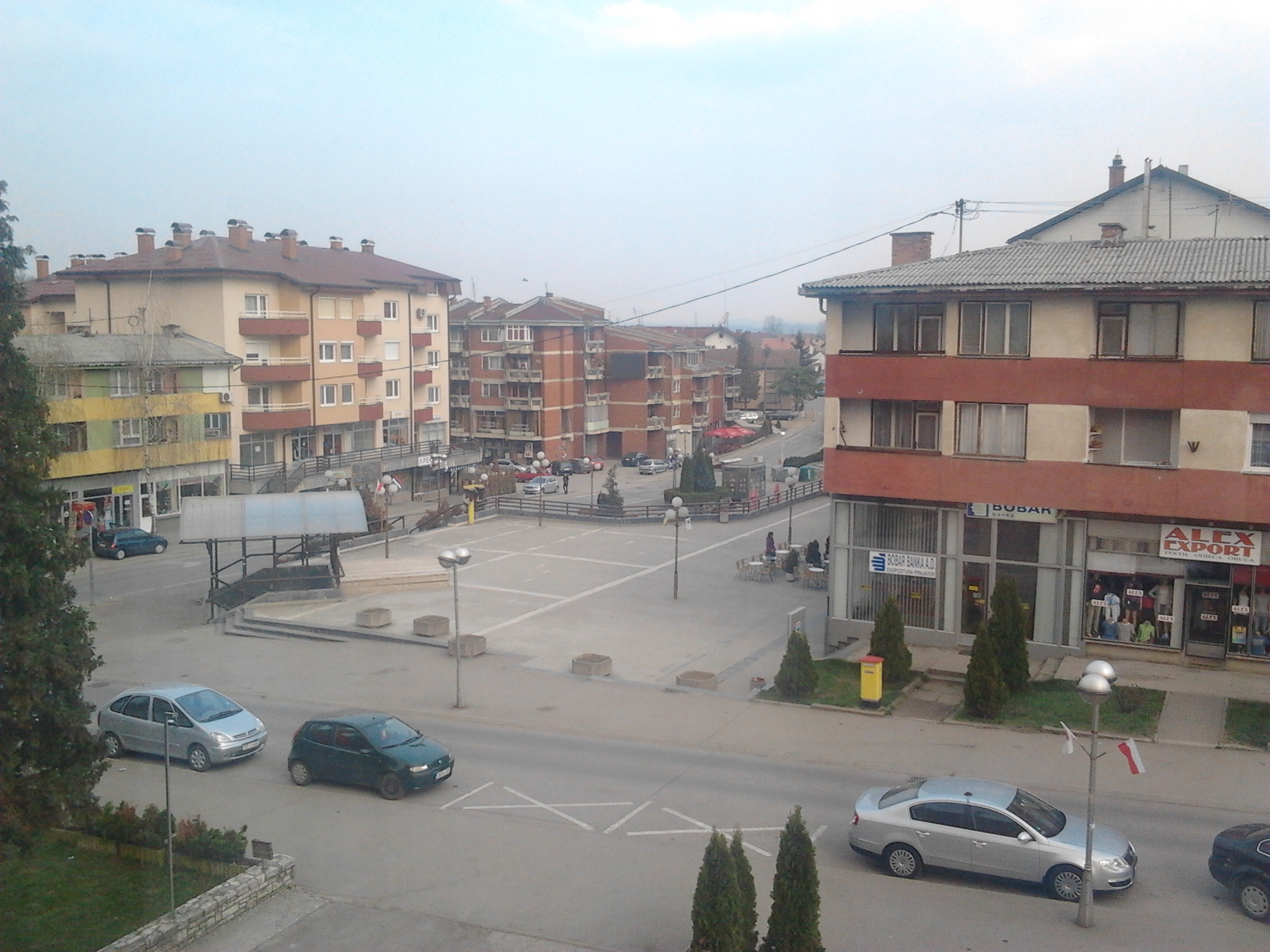
- Prnjavor center

- Coat of arms

- Location of Prnjavor within Republika Srpska

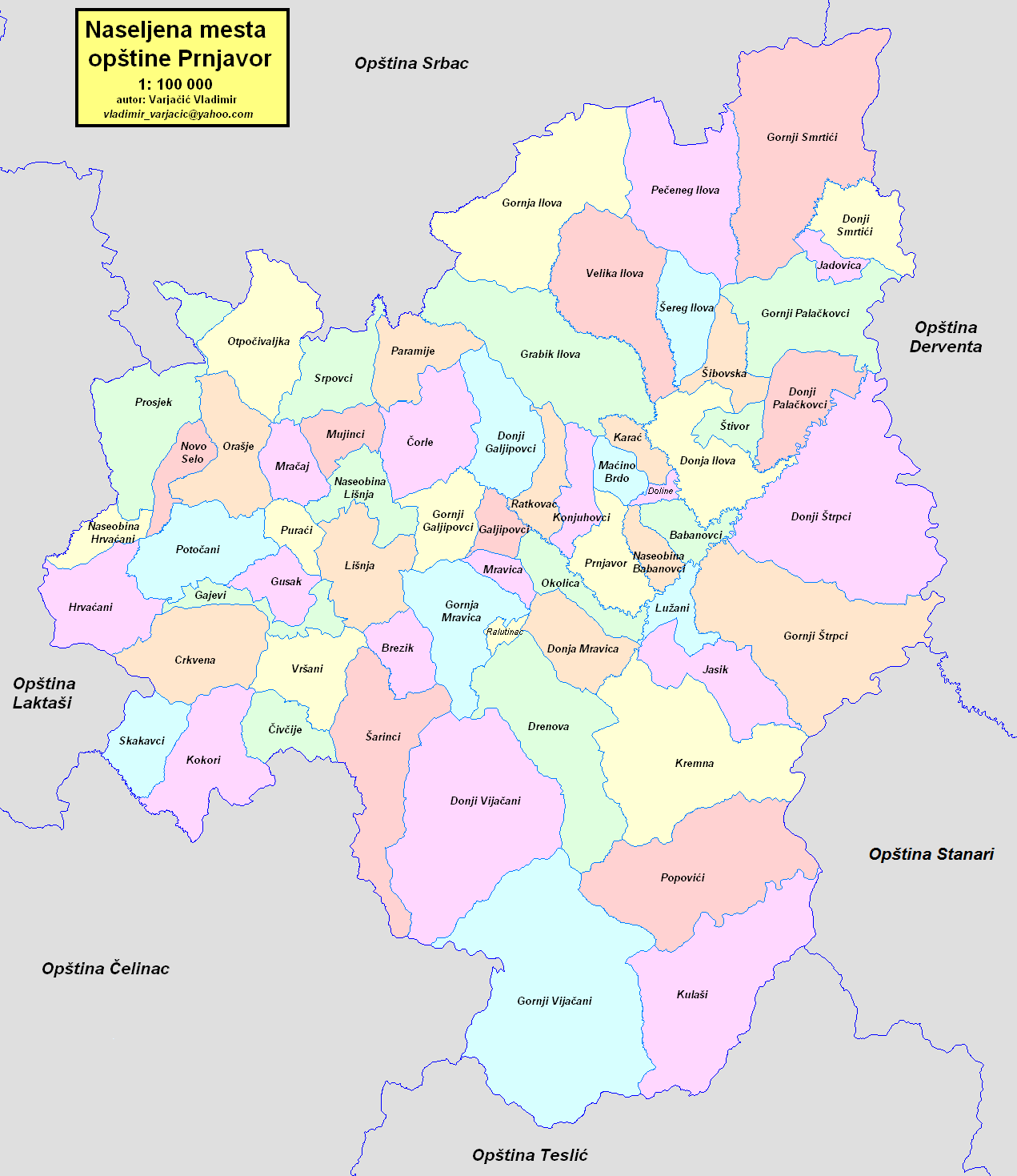
- Coordinates: 44°52′N 17°39′E
- Country: Bosnia and Herzegovina
- Entity: Republika Srpska
- Geographical region: Bosanska Krajina/Central Bosnia

Government
  - Mayor: Darko Tomaš (SNSD)

Area
  - Municipality: 629.99 km^{2} (243.24 sq mi)

Population (2013)
  - Municipality: 35,956
  - Urban: 8,120
- Time zone: UTC+1 (CET)
  - Summer (DST): UTC+2 (CEST)
- Area code: 51
- Website: Grad Prnjavor

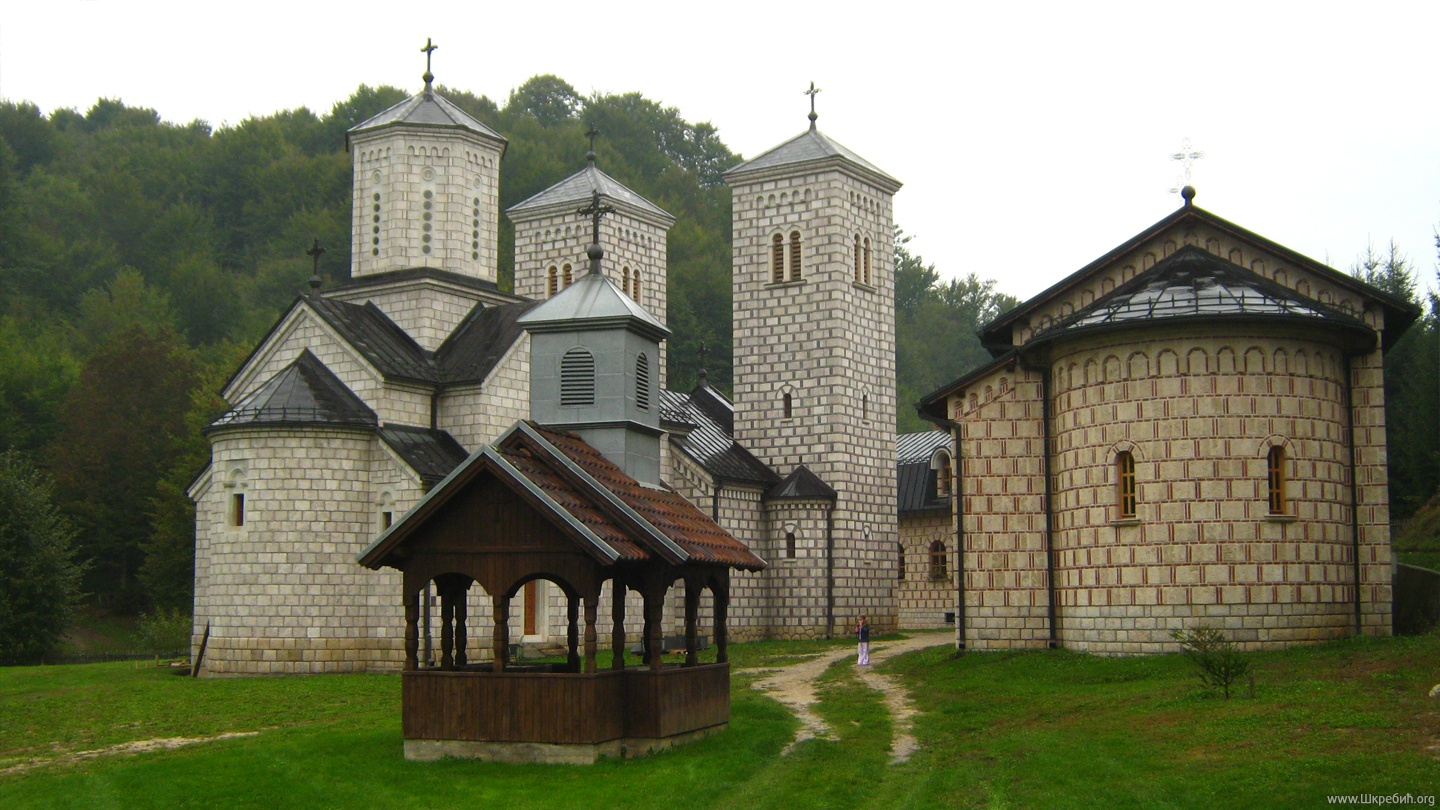
Stuplje monastery

Prnjavor (Serbian Cyrillic: Прњавор, pronounced [prɲǎːʋɔr]) is a city and municipality in Republika Srpska, Bosnia and Herzegovina. According to the 2013 census, the town has a population of 8,120 inhabitants, with 35,956 inhabitants in the municipality.

== Geography ==
=== Physical geography ===
The municipality is located in the basin of the Ukrina river and is characterized by a mostly lowland hilly terrain configuration with the highest peak of 594m (mountain Ljubić). The Municipality of Prnjavor is shielded on all sides by low mountains such as Ljubić (south) and Motajica (north). The town of Prnjavor is located at an altitude of 185m. Other than the river Ukrina which forms in the Municipality of Prnjavor by merging of the Big and Small Ukrina near the village of Kulaši, there are also the rivers of Vijaka and Lišnja and various other streams. On the river Vijaka in the foothills of Ljubić there is a man made lake Drenova and further downstream there are Ribnjak fishing grounds.

=== Political geography ===
The municipality is located in the northern part of Republika Srpska and borders the municipalities of Derventa, Stanari, Teslić, Čelinac, Laktaši and Srbac. It has an area of 629.99 km^{2} and makes up 2,568% of the total territory of the Republika Srpska.

=== Climate ===
The area of the municipality belongs to the zone of temperate continental climate with moderately cold winters (average temperature in January 1 °C) and moderately warm summers (average temperature in July 31 °C). The average number of total hours of sunshine in the municipality of Prnjavor is 1,600 hours. The average annual rainfall is about 950 mm, and is evenly distributed throughout the year.

== History ==
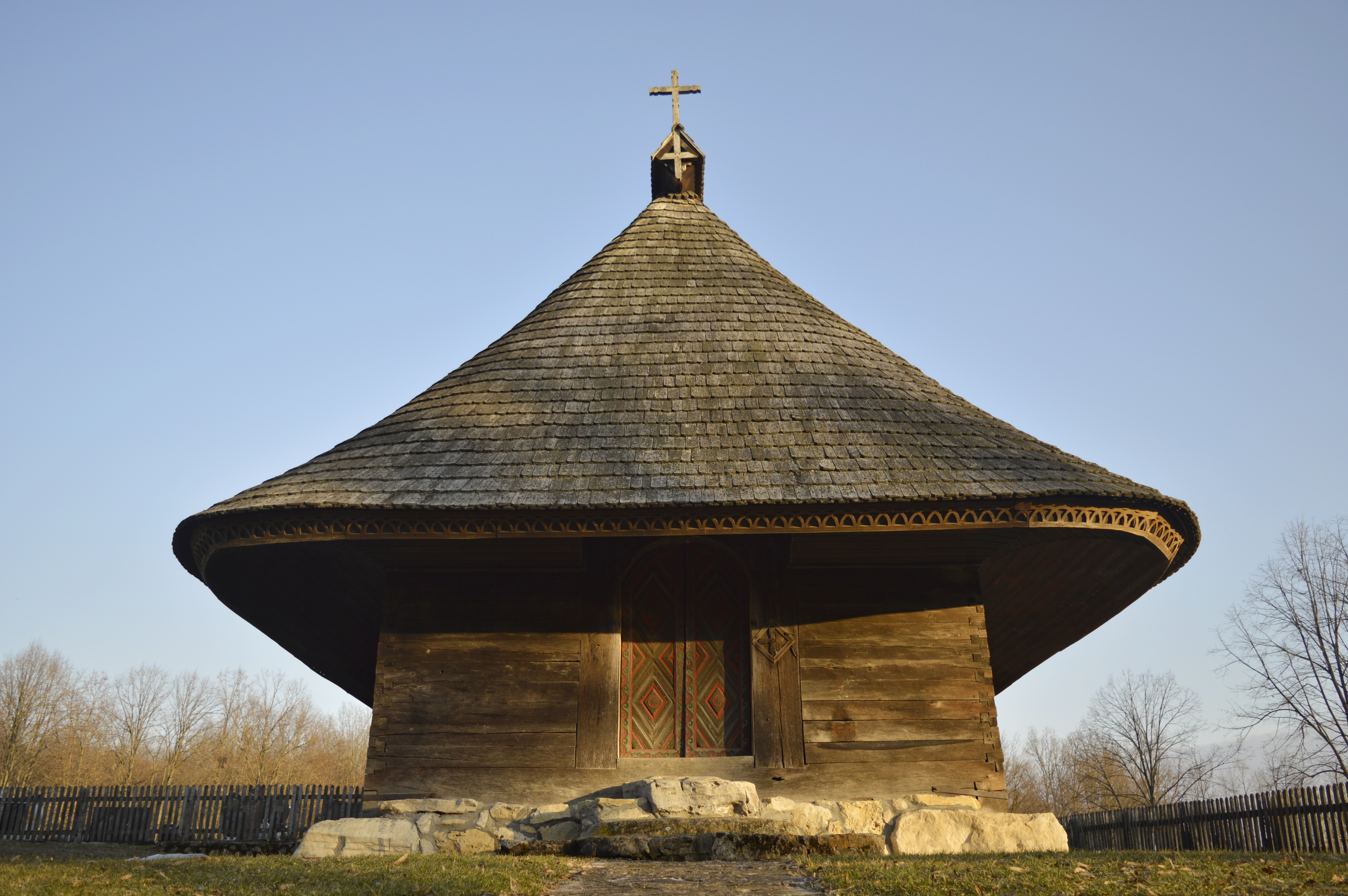
Wooden church Palačkovci

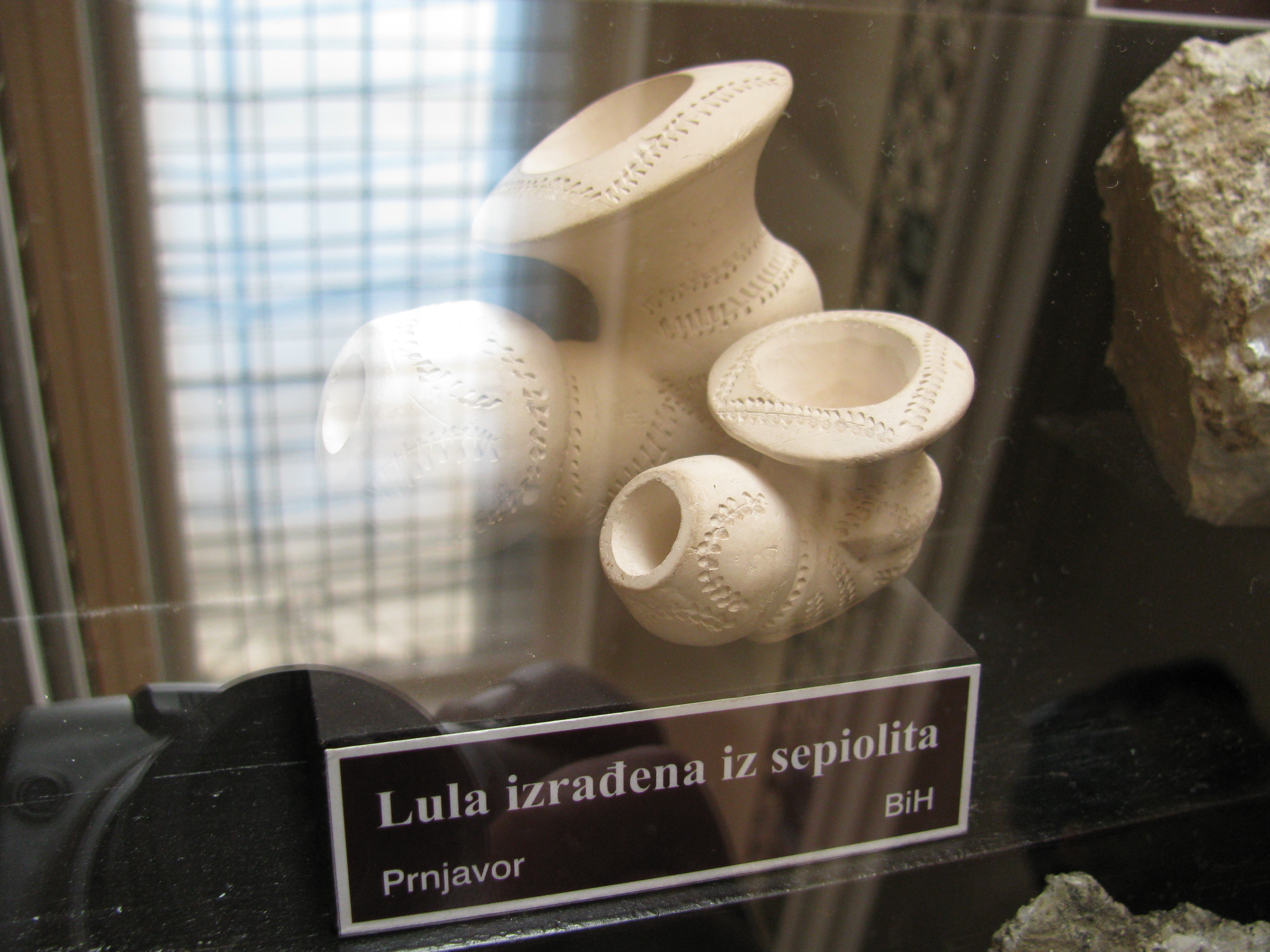
Smoke pipe made out of Sepiolite from Prnjavor displayed at National Museum of Bosnia and Herzegovina in Sarajevo.

=== Middle Ages ===
Even over 700 years ago people recognized the economic potential of the area of the present-day Municipality of Prnjavor. Although there had been some settlements from the Roman period here, significant colonization and settlement (including the construction of monasteries, such as the one of at Stuplje) took place only in the Middle Ages. According to historical sources, medieval monasteries had their landed properties called Prnjavori, and the locals living there were called Prnjavorci. This is believed to be the origin of the name Prnjavor.

=== Ottoman era ===
During the Ottoman period the region suffered from border conflicts with the Austrian Empire. A significant number of Bosnians converted to Islam after the conquest by the Ottoman Empire in the second half of the 15th century, giving it a unique character within the Balkan region. This conversion appears to have been not sudden but a gradual process based on various rules imposed by the Ottomans — it took more than a hundred years for the number of Muslims to become the majority religion. The general view among scholars is that the Islamization of the Bosnian population was not the result of violent methods of conversions but was, for the most part, peaceful and voluntary.

The first time Prnjavor was mentioned in recorded history was in 1829. The current settlement itself is believed to be of a more recent date. In the mid-19th century and according to the records of the travel writer Jukić, Prnjavor had about a hundred houses and around a thousand inhabitants.

=== Austria-Hungary ===
In 1878 Austria-Hungary occupied Bosnia and the authorities decided the Prnjavor area was under-populated. Efforts were undertaken to attract settlers from other parts of the empire and consequently the municipal area was settled by Italians, Ukrainians, Czechs, Poles, Hungarians and German-speaking folk from Austria, Germany, Bohemia, Hungary and Russia. Although over half the population remained Eastern Orthodox Serbs, the multi-ethnic character of the population led the municipality of Prnjavor to be nicknamed "Little Europe".

=== Yugoslavia ===
In 1918 Bosnia became part of Kingdom of Serbs, Croats and Slovenes and all immigration stopped. During the interwar period between 1918 and 1941 Prnjavor underwent more significant economic development through the opening of craftsman workshops, hotels, more shops and a few manufacturing plants. From 1929 to 1941 Prnjavor was part of the Vrbas Banovina of the Kingdom of Yugoslavia.

Following the collapse of internal security during World War II the Nazis decided to evacuate the Volksdeutsche (ethnic German) population from Bosnia and a treaty to this effect was signed with the Croatian Ustaše regime on 30 September 1942. After 1945 the Communist regime of Josip Broz Tito repopulated the Volksdeutsche villages with Serbs and destroyed or obscured all evidence of German history and heritage in the region.

During the Socialist period of the Socialist Federal Republic of Yugoslavia Prnjavor was not a highly developed municipality within Bosnia and Herzegovina.

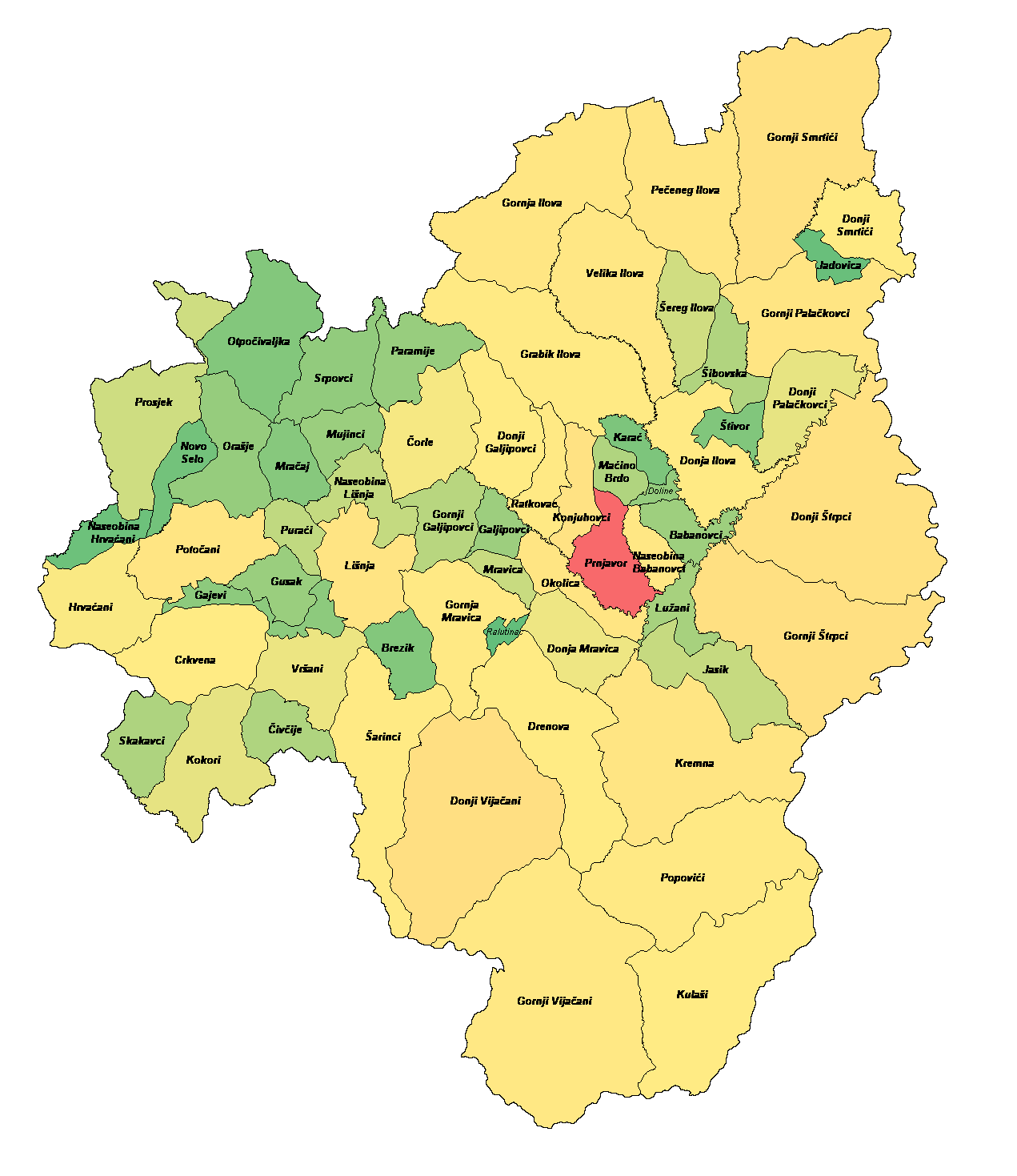
Prnjavor municipality by population proportional to the settlement with the highest and lowest population

After the war that erupted after the collapse of the Socialist Federal Republic of Yugoslavia (SFRY), Prnjavor became part of the North-Eastern entity of Bosnia and Herzegovina, the Republika Srpska, as per the Dayton Agreement. The warring that took place in the very proximity of Prnjavor e.g. in Derventa, changed the demography in Bosnia and Herzegovina, according to the ICRC, a total of 2,2 million people had to flee their homes from different parts of Bosnia and Herzegovina. Many people never returned, changing the ethnic composition in all parts of Bosnia and Herzegovina.

== Demographics ==
=== Population ===
Population of settlements – Prnjavor municipality

	Settlement	1961.	1971.	1981.	1991.	2013.
	Total	46,109	46,734	48,956	47,055	35,956
1	Babanovci		358	418	398	190
2	Brezik		385	343	304	128
3	Velika Ilova		983	1,051	1,041	707
4	Vršani		791	764	722	375
5	Gajevi		249	205	191	149
6	Galjipovci		370	377	400	212
7	Gornja Ilova		1,488	1,502	1,391	769
8	Gornja Mravica		1,001	869	782	588
9	Gornji Vijačani		1,412	1,361	1,074	643
10	Gornji Galjipovci		420	432	339	259
11	Gornji Palačkovci		1,246	1,344	1,235	843
12	Gornji Smrtići		1,523	1,543	1,443	1,148
13	Gornji Štrpci		1,552	1,520	1,356	1,215
14	Grabik Ilova		995	940	839	585
15	Gusak		217	238	237	183
16	Doline		195	148	193	170
17	Donja Ilova		807	841	817	549
18	Donja Mravica		496	479	448	401
19	Donji Vijačani		2,268	2,063	1,700	1,226
20	Donji Galjipovci		467	435	426	439
21	Donji Palačkovci		617	620	568	371
22	Donji Smrtići		604	646	672	471
23	Donji Štrpci		1,712	1,657	1,516	1,096
24	Drenova		1,082	955	864	459
25	Jadovica		94	94	93	80
26	Jasik		172	224	227	292
27	Karać		195	109	96	113
28	Kokori		770	790	606	385
29	Kojuhovci		786	1,212	1,451	1,084
30	Kremna		1,114	1,198	1,155	929
31	Kulaši		1,149	1,368	1,234	496
32	Lišnja		1,940	1,888	1,847	963
33	Lužani		239	182	179	216
34	Maćino Brdo		224	226	170	243
35	Mravica		529	534	548	312
36	Mračaj		296	254	219	139
37	Mujinci		520	332	260	182
38	Naseobina Babanovci		313	425	506	690
39	Naseobina Lišnja		314	487	477	282
40	Naseobina Hrvaćani		136	171	140	74
41	Novo Selo		455	181	168	88
42	Okolica		375	518	529	852
43	Orašje		349	519	363	210
44	Otpočivaljka		415	290	229	126
45	Paramije		304	362	289	176
46	Pečeneg Ilova		1,301	1,357	1,287	875
47	Popovići		1,151	1,165	951	591
48	Potočani		677	690	597	854
49	Prnjavor	2,939	4,055	6,187	8,104	8,120
50	Prosjek		665	598	476	311
51	Puraći		363	384	426	273
52	Ralutinac		88	122	94	49
53	Ratkovac		224	342	349	606
54	Skakavci		449	462	365	233
55	Srpovci		411	377	305	164
56	Hrvaćani		875	847	670	411
57	Crkvena		936	922	721	472
58	Čivčije		528	463	374	245
59	Čorle		700	665	632	416
60	Šarinci		1,328	1,114	862	531
61	Šereg Ilova		477	497	449	317
62	Šibovska		262	299	249	243
63	Štivor		287	350	402	137

=== Ethnic composition ===
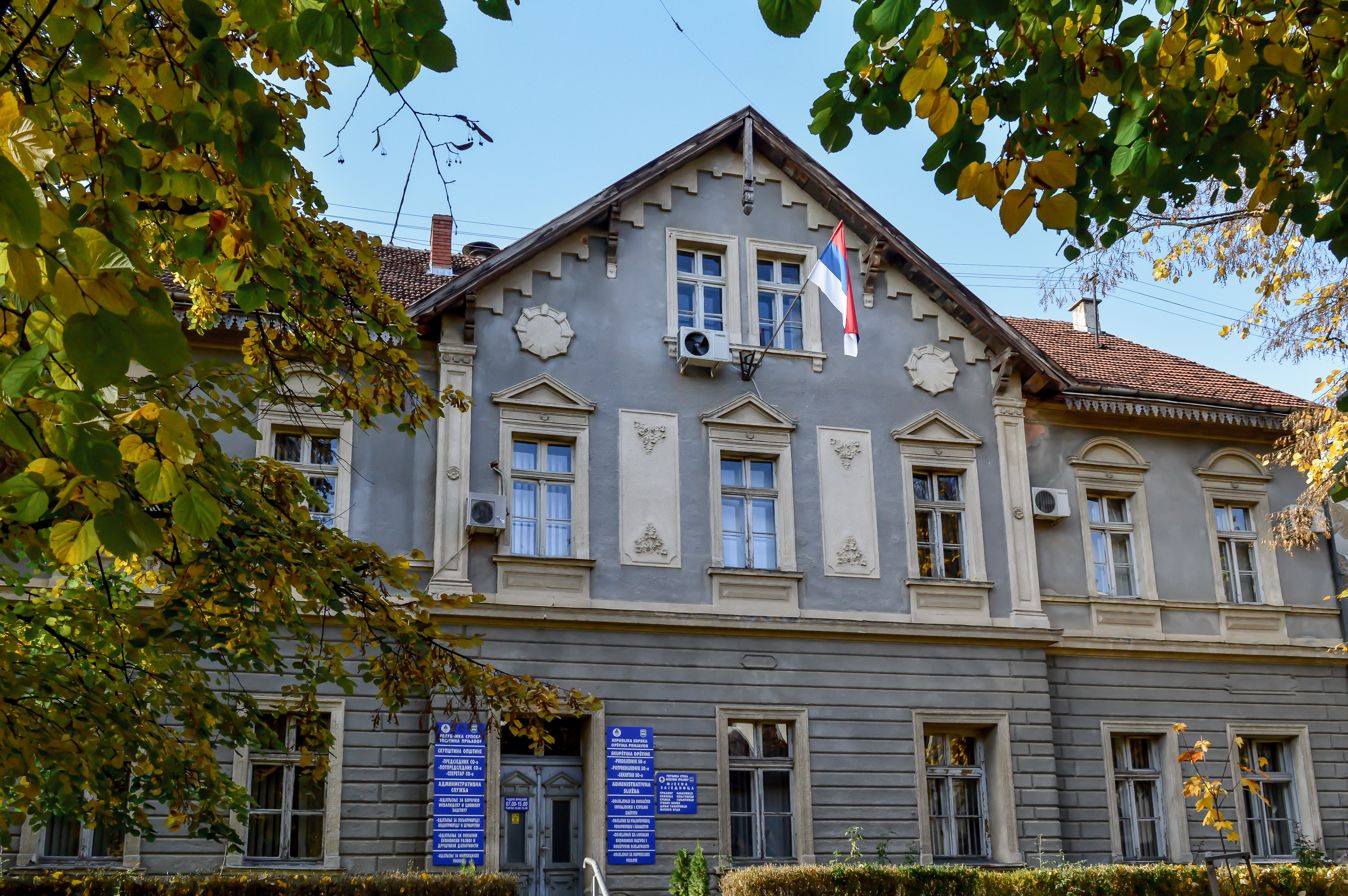
Municipal assembly building

In the end of the 19th century, during Austria-Hungary, then sparsely populated area of the Municipality of Prnjavor was colonized by settlers from Eastern and Central Europe (Ukraine, Italy (South Tirol), Hungary, Poland, Germany, Austria, Bohemia, Slovakia, etc.). At the time of the former Socialist Federal Republic of Yugoslavia and due to numerous national minorities (about 20) Prnjavor was called "Little Europe". Except the Ukrainian, Italian and Czech national minorities the others were mainly small communities. But, even today, besides the constitutive nations of Serbs, Croats, and Bosniaks, a small number of Hungarians, Slovaks, Germans, Polish, Slovenes, Bulgarians, Romanians, Macedonians, Jews, and Russians live in Prnjavor.

According to the census of 1991 there were still 732 Italians in Bosnia and Herzegovina, thereof around 2/3 lived in municipality of Prnjavor, while at the end of the second world war most of the Italians had returned to Italy to today's Trento province. The Italians populated mainly the village of Štivor in Prnjavor, where in 1991 73.13% of the population spoke Italian as their mother tongue.

The village school "Šibovska" teaches in Italian language "lingua d'insegnamento italiana". In 1986, it had 91 pupils and eight teachers.

The Polish population that arrived during the Austro-Hungarian empire, mostly left after the second world war in the population exchanges where German population left from the Western Poland to Germany after redrawing of borders, and Polish population from different parts of Europe, including Prnjavor, returned to the empty areas in Western Poland, mainly Boleslawiec.

Ethnic composition – Prnjavor town
	2013.	1991.	1981.	1971.
Total	8,120 (100,0%)	8,104 (100,0%)	6,187 (100,0%)	4,055 (100,0%)
Serbs	6,572 (80,9%)	3,891 (48,0%)	2,577 (41,7%)	1,545 (38,1%)
Bosniaks	811 (10,0%)	2,345 (28,9%)	1,915 (31,0%)	1,737 (42,8%)
Ukrainians	242 (3,0%)			
Croats	141 (1,7%)	219 (2,7%)	261 (4,2%)	275 (6,8%)
Unaffiliated	112 (1,4%)			
Others	103 (1,3%)	723 (8,9%)	474 (7,7%)	423 (10,4%)
Macedonians	78 (1,0%)			1 (0,03%)
Yugoslavs	28 (0,3%)	926 (11,4%)	907 (14,7%)	48 (1,2%)
Roma	13 (0,2%)		17 (0,3%)	
Montenegrins	9 (0,1%)		25 (0,4%)	10 (0,2%)
Slovenes	6 (0,07%)		6 (0,1%)	10 (0,2%)
Unknown	5 (0,06%)			
Albanians			5 (0,08%)	6 (0,15%)

Ethnic composition – Prnjavor municipality
	2013.	1991.	1981.	1971.
Total	35,956 (100,0%)	47,055 (100,0%)	48,956 (100,0%)	46,734 (100,0%)
Serbs	30,685 (85,3%)	33,508 (71,2%)	34,699 (70,9%)	35,177 (75,3%)
Bosniaks	3,085 (8,6%)	7,143 (15,2%)	6,618 (13,5%)	6,143 (13,1%)
Ukrainians	858 (2,4%)			
Croats	451 (1,3%)	1,721 (3,7%)	2,060 (4,2%)	2,148 (4,6%)
Others	385 (1,1%)	2,926 (6,2%)	3,045 (6,2%)	3,032 (6,5%)
Unaffiliated	239 (0,7%)			
Macedonians	94 (0,3%)		2 (0,004%)	6 (0,013%)
Yugoslavs	41 (0,1%)	1,757 (3,7%)	2,400 (4,9%)	96 (0,2%)
Roma	40 (0,1%)		42 (0,09%)	53 (0,11%)
Unknown	33 (0,09%)			
Slovenes	25 (0,07%)		31 (0,06%)	31 (0,07%)
Montenegrins	20 (0,06%)		52 (0,11%)	38 (0,08%)
Albanians			7 (0,014%)	10 (0,021%)

== Economy ==
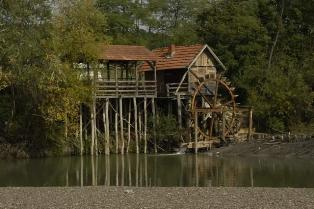
Old mill on Ukrina

Fishing Ground Ribnjak

The municipality of Prnjavor has the following land resources: farmlands (437.79 km^{2} (169 sq mi)/68.8%), cultivable land (382.64 km^{2} (147.74 sq mi)), forest resources (173.39 km^{2} (66.95 sq mi)) and water resources (Ukrina River, Drenova Lake).

Considering that almost four-fifths of the population live in rural areas and reckoning with great areas of cultivable land, with all reason agriculture has been recognized as the key branch of the economy considering the Municipality development. In the area of Prnjavor more than 200 km^{2} (49,000 acres) of land are cultivated while 6.1 km^{2} (1,510 acres) is planted with fruit crops.

Out of the total area of the cultivated farmlands, the cereal crops share is 77%, vegetable crops 10% while the rest has been sown with industrial crops, berries and fruit crops. New greenhouses are being constructed, health food production (organic agriculture) projects have been started to which the Municipality of Prnjavor has great predispositions due to the lack of significant industrial capacities as well as the preserved nature.

Economic preview

The following table gives a preview of total number of registered employed people per their core activity (as of 2016):

Activity	Total
Agriculture, forestry and fishing	128
Mining and quarrying	14
Manufacturing	1,976
Distribution of power, gas, steam and air-conditioning	91
Distribution of water and water waste management	130
Construction	105
Wholesale and retail, repair	1,330
Transportation and storage	266
Hotels and restaurants	317
Information and communication	65
Finance and insurance	64
Real estate activities	19
Professional, scientific and technical activities	167
Administrative and support services	31
Public administration and defence	314
Education	688
Healthcare and social work	253
Art, entertainment and recreation	16
Other service activities	106
Total	6,070

== Tourism and leisure ==
Rivers and streams, the areas of timber-lands as well as the Ukrina's banks covered with greenery and the old mills make this river attractive for nature and fishing enthusiasts. The Drenova lake and fishing ground Ribnjak both have a foundation for hunting and fishing development. In 2003 a record catch (a 91 kg heavy catfish) was registered at this lake, otherwise being a fishing ground.

Hunting grounds, the hunting grounds on Mt. Motajica, in the forest lands of Čavka and Mt. Ljubić as well as the fishing ground of Ribnjak have again become destinations for hunters from Germany, Austria and especially Italy.

SRC "Borik", Borik is a sports recreation center located north of the town Prnjavor, which consists of a forest park along which there are various camping spots, a very well known and popular restaurant among the locals "Lovački dom", as well as a volleyball court, outdoor gym and a children's playground.

Kulaši Spa, 14 km (9 mi) from the town of Prnjavor, has been known as a sanatorium ever since Austria-Hungarian rule in this area. Therapeutic factors: water is hyperalkalescent (pH 12.75) and includes hydrogen sulphide (H_{2}S, HS^{+}). The water is hyperthermal and its temperature is 28 °C (82 °F). Basic water characteristics: curative, oligomineral, thermomineral, hyperalkalic, chloride and sulphide water with the presence of calcium and sodium. Indications: degenerative skin disease (psoriasis, eczema, hair root sebreae, acne etc.) postoperative conditions, inflammatory diseases of the bone-joint-and-muscle system, liver, stomach, kidney and urinary tract diseases etc.

Lipizzaner stables "Vučijak", founded in 1946, belongs to the group of the most famous horse farms from the time of ex-Yugoslavia. There are about fifty Lipizzaner head on it with significant presence of several breeding lines and stocks. It is located in the village of Lužanit. It currently offers horse riding classes and is going through a reconstruction to be able to offer services in the field of education, tourism and leisure as well as recreational and medical activities.

Stuplje and Liplje monasteries, two twins and in books they are always mentioned together as the victims of burning during Ottoman reign. After having been burnt by the Ottomans during Austrian-Ottoman war they were neglected. The foundations of Stuplje were found in Gornji Vijačani (village not far from Prnjavor) only in mid-1994. The reconstruction and building of this medieval monastery has been going on ever since.

The Roman Catholic church of Saint Anthony of Padua, located in the town of Prnjavor was built in 1909 during the Austro-Hungarian empire.

The Prnjavor town mosque, located in the town of Prnjavor has been entered into the list of national heritage sites of Bosnia and Herzegovina, while it was destroyed during the war in 1992 but later rebuilt.

The log-built church in Palačkovci, located in the village of Gornji Palaćkovci is one of the most important cultural monuments in the municipality. It is devoted to apostles St Peter and St Paul and was built in 1843 in the period of Ottoman rule. In terms of its construction and engineering as well as aesthetically it is a real small master-piece of popular architecture. Even at the time of Yugoslavia it was declared a worldwide cultural heritage monument and was put under the protection of the state. It is currently, among other monuments, on the list under consideration to be mentioned as a cultural heritage of Bosnia and Herzegovina.

== Culture ==
=== Cultural societies ===
- SPKD "Prosvjeta" Prnjavor
- GKUD "Pronija" Prnjavor
- KUD "Hakija Tabaković" Lišnja
- UKPD "Taras Ševčenko" Prnjavor
- Town choir Prnjavor

== Sport ==
- Football: FK "Ljubić" Prnjavor

The club was founded in 1946 and until 1991 it had little importance in the football world of the SFRY. With the disintegration of Yugoslavia, this club finally managed to reach the public. It started in 1992 in the Second League of Republika Srpska, then in 1993 it moved to the First League of Republika Srpska. It left the First League in 1996, but returned the following season. It is currently in the Second League of Republika Srpska. It plays at the "Borik" stadium in Prnjavor which has a capacity of about 2500 people.

- Basketball: KK "Mladost '76" and OKK "Prnjavor"
- Volleyball: OK "Ukrina"
- Tennis: TK "Bonito"
- Mountaineering: PD "Korak Više" Prnjavor
- Handball: RK "Sloga"

== Twin towns – sister cities ==
Prnjavor is twinned with:

- Boleslawiec, Poland
- Boskovice, Czech Republic
- Sinj, Croatia
- Sremski Karlovci, Serbia
- Zhydachiv, Ukraine

== Notable people ==
- Milan Bjegojević, former basketball player and coach
- Tarik Đođić, author and CEO of Al Jazeera Balkans
- Faruk Đođić, researcher
- Neven Subotić, football player
- Milan Marinković, former basketball player and coach
- Marko Todorović, actor
- Cvjetko Popović

== See also ==
- Municipalities of Republika Srpska
- Schutzberg, Bosnia
