= Brod, Bosnia and Herzegovina =

Brod Брод
- Town and municipality
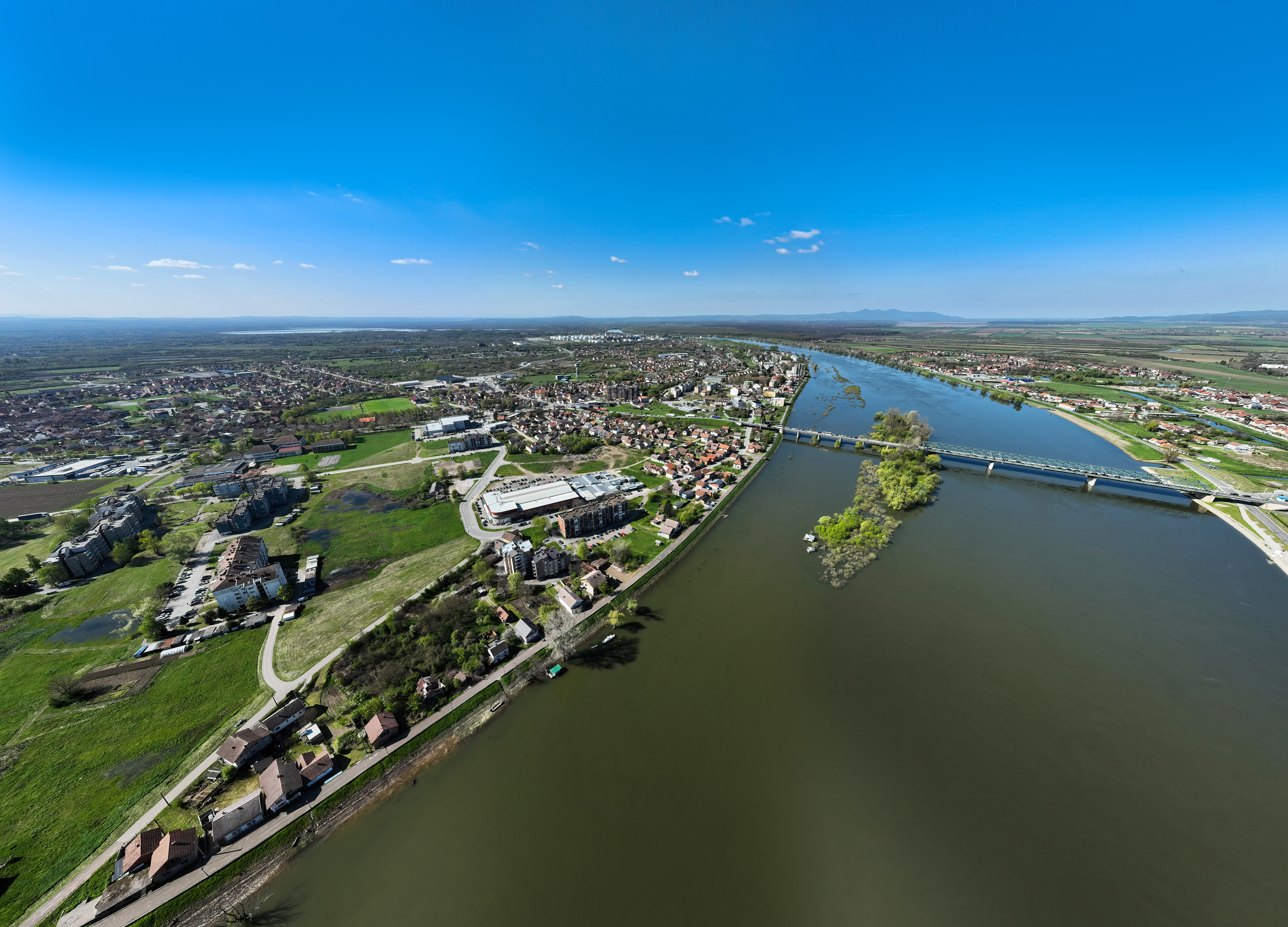
- Brod with border bridge crossing Sava River

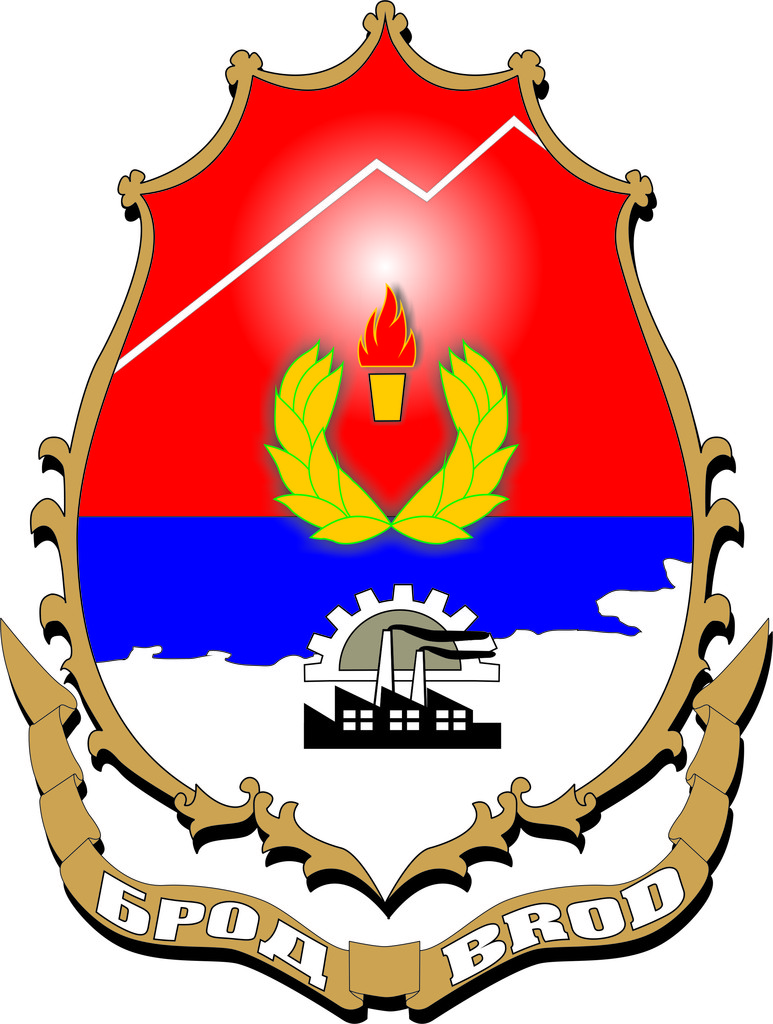
- Coat of arms

- Location of Brod within Bosnia and Herzegovina

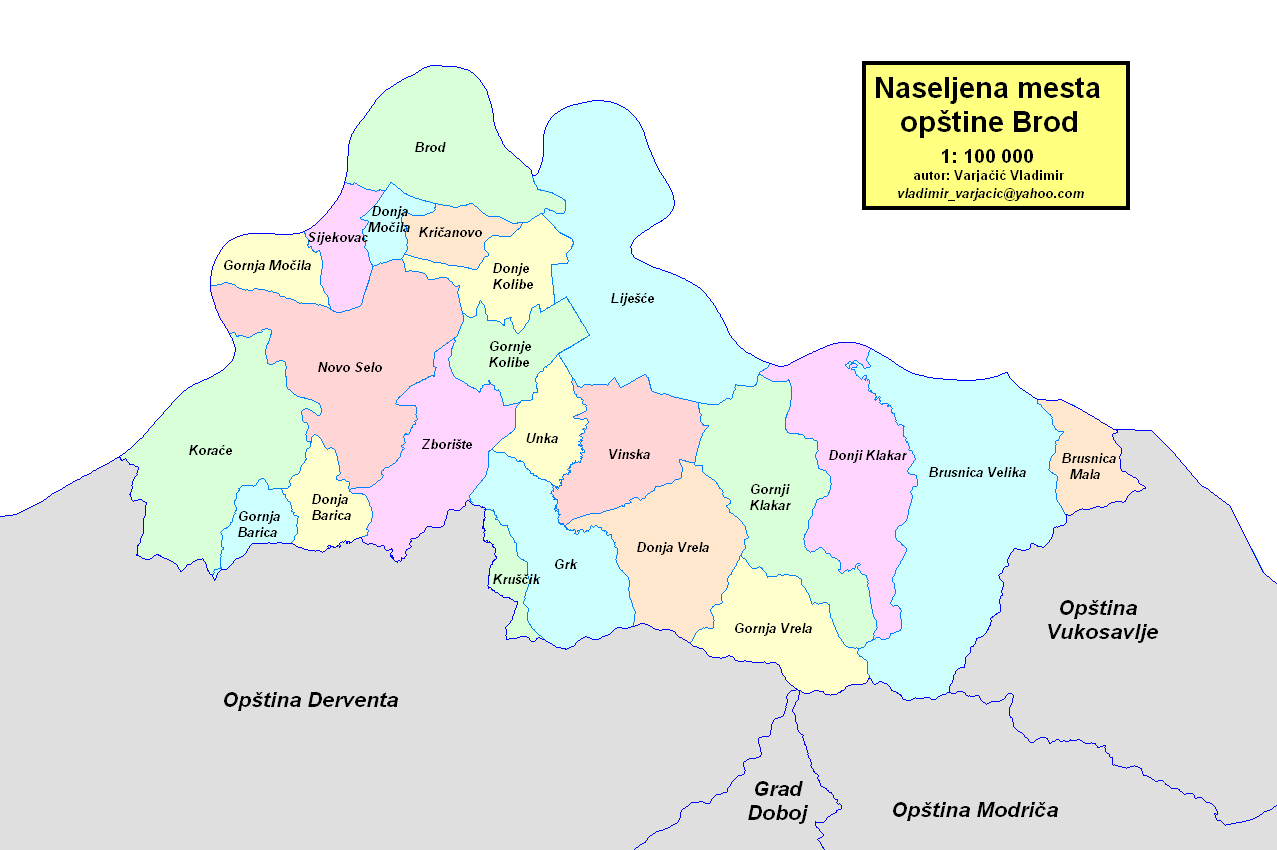
- Coordinates: 45°08′N 17°59′E
- Country: Bosnia and Herzegovina
- Entity: Republika Srpska
- Geographical region: Posavina

Government
  - Municipal mayor: Milan Zečević (SNSD)
  - Municipality: 229.3 km^{2} (88.5 sq mi)

Population (2013 census)
  - Town: 8,563
  - Municipality: 16,619
  - Municipality density: 72.48/km^{2} (187.7/sq mi)
- Time zone: UTC+1 (CET)
  - Summer (DST): UTC+2 (CEST)
- Area code: 53
- Website: www.opstina-brod.net

Brod (Serbian Cyrillic: Брод, pronounced [brôːd]), formerly Bosanski Brod (Serbian Cyrillic: Босански Брод) and Srpski Brod (Serbian Cyrillic: Српски Брод), is a town and municipality in Republika Srpska, Bosnia and Herzegovina. It is situated on the south bank of the river Sava, in the western part of the Posavina region. As of 2013, the town has a population of 7,637 inhabitants, while the municipality has a population of 16,619 inhabitants.

== Name ==
The city's name refers to a place where river can be crossed, a ford.

Upon the conclusion of the Treaty of Passarowitz in 1718, Bosanski Brod was to be transferred to the Habsburg monarchy.

Prior to the Bosnian War of the 1990s, the town was known as Bosanski Brod. During the war the prefix "Bosanski" was replaced with "Srpski" due to the town being under Serb control. In May 2009, the National Assembly of the Republika Srpska removed any prefix from the name resulting in the name Brod. Today its official name is just Brod, without either prefix Bosanski or Srpski. The Croatian town of Slavonski Brod is situated on the opposite (northern) bank of the Sava, forming a built-up area of more than 110,000 inhabitants.

The bridge over the Sava River at Brod was destroyed in the early hours of October 1992 by Croat forces after they along with the Croat population retreated across it to Slavonski Brod due to a Serb offensive, the bridge was destroyed in order to disallow any possible Serb offensives across it. It was rebuilt several years after hostilities ceased.

== History ==
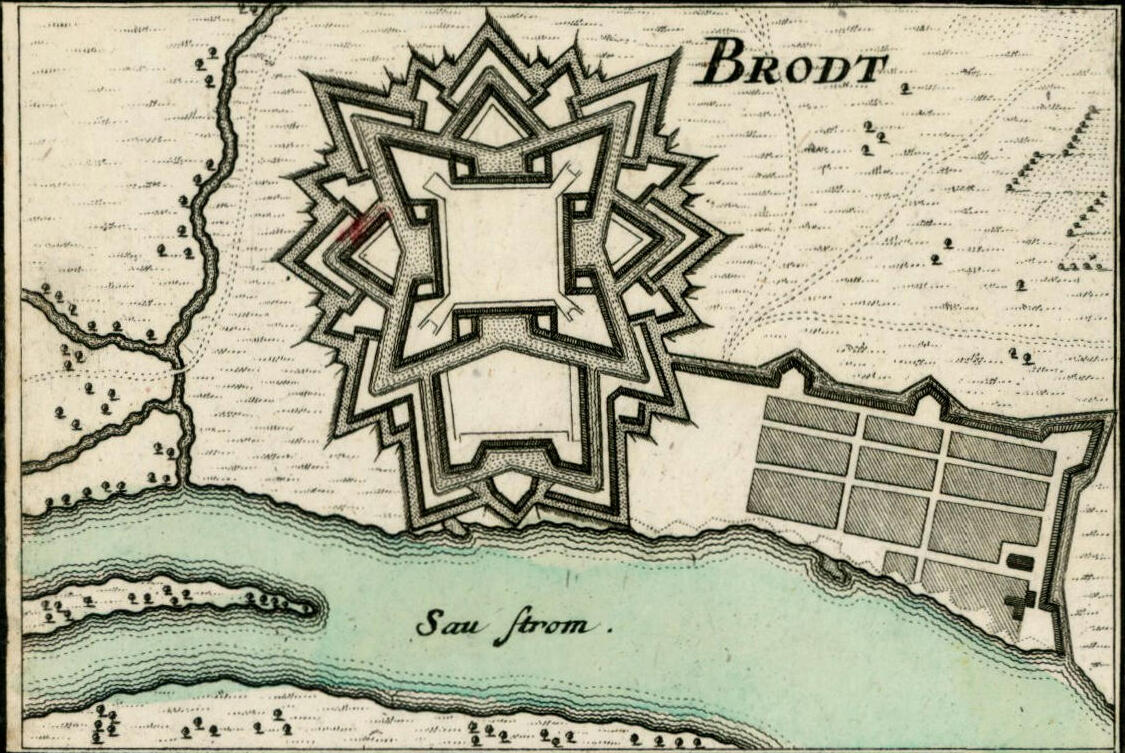
1738 map of the fortifications of Brod

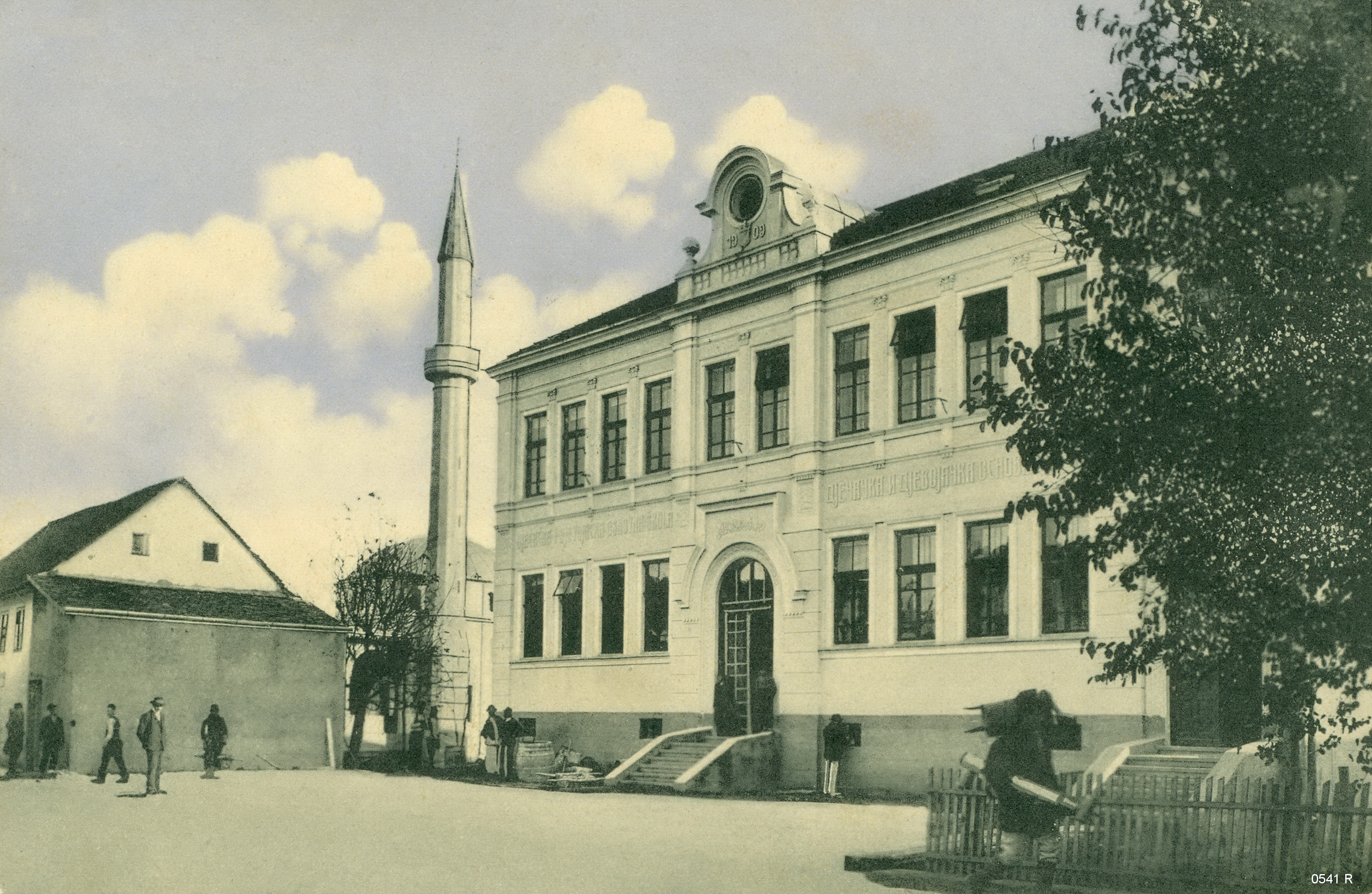
Brod in 1912

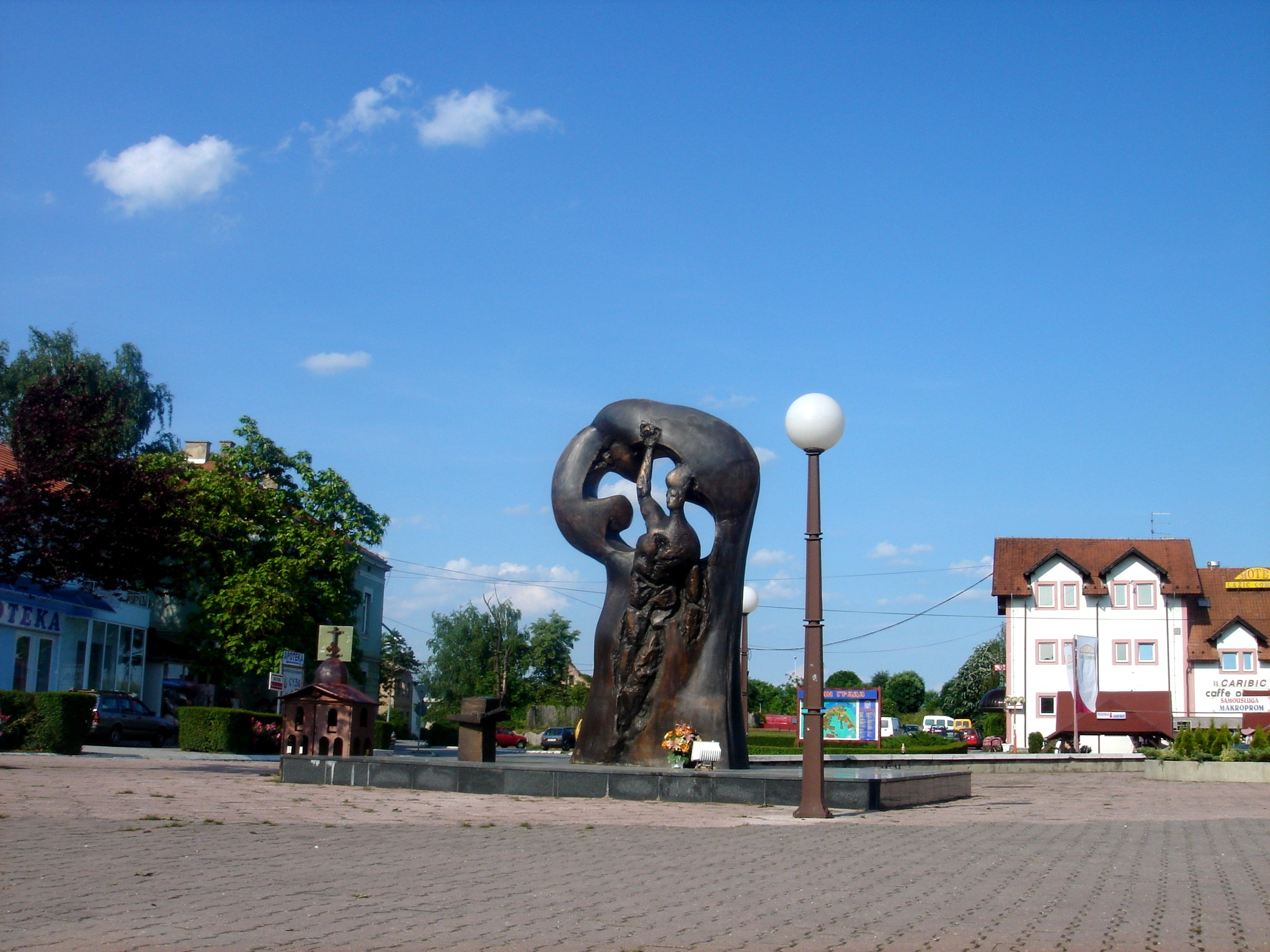
Monument on the central square dedicated to the soldiers who died fighting for Republika Srpska

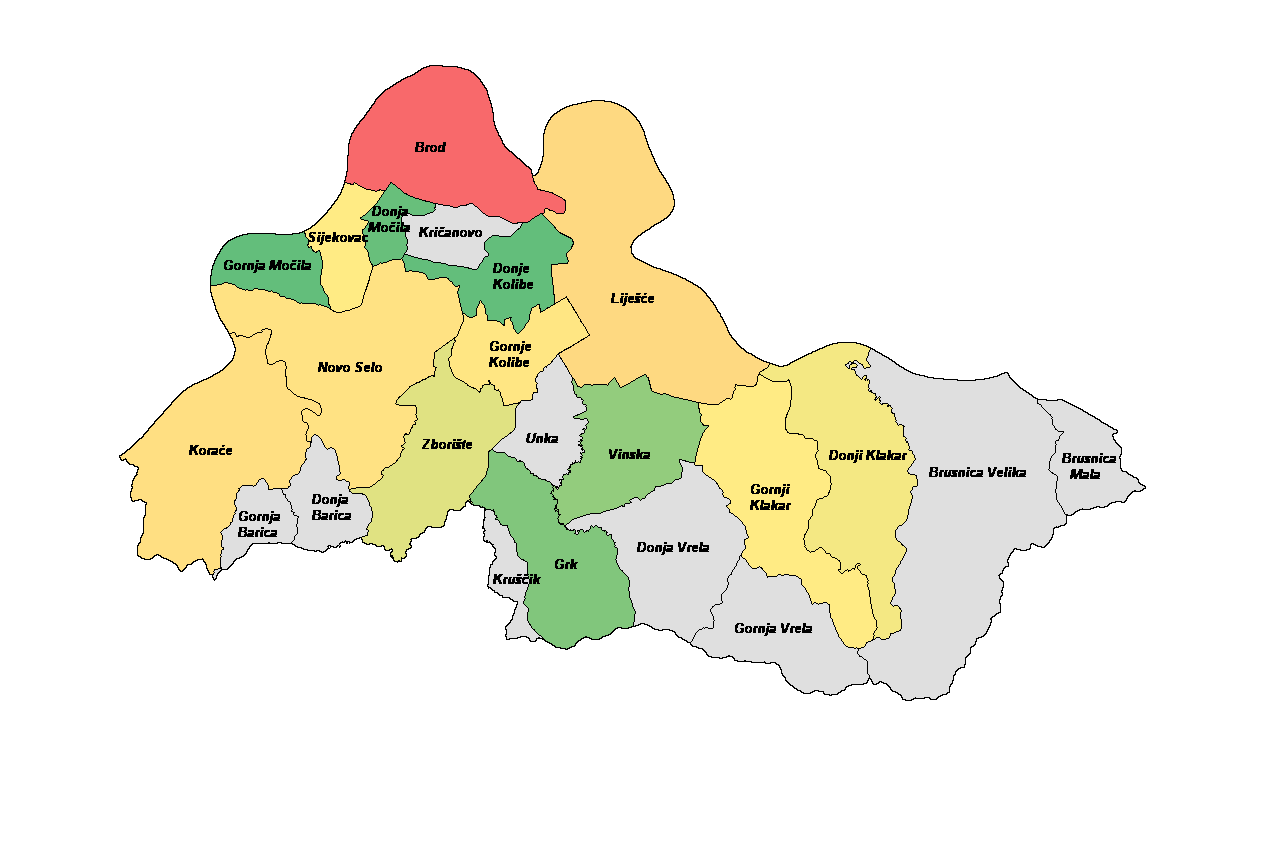
Brod municipality by population proportional to the settlement with the highest and lowest population

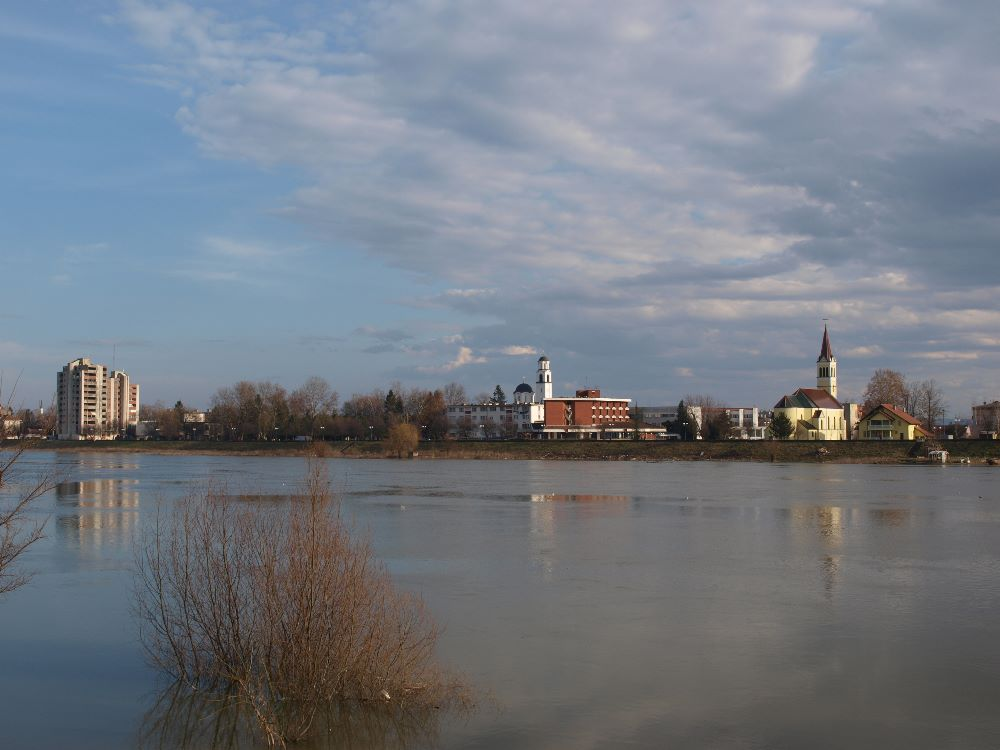
Panorama of the city

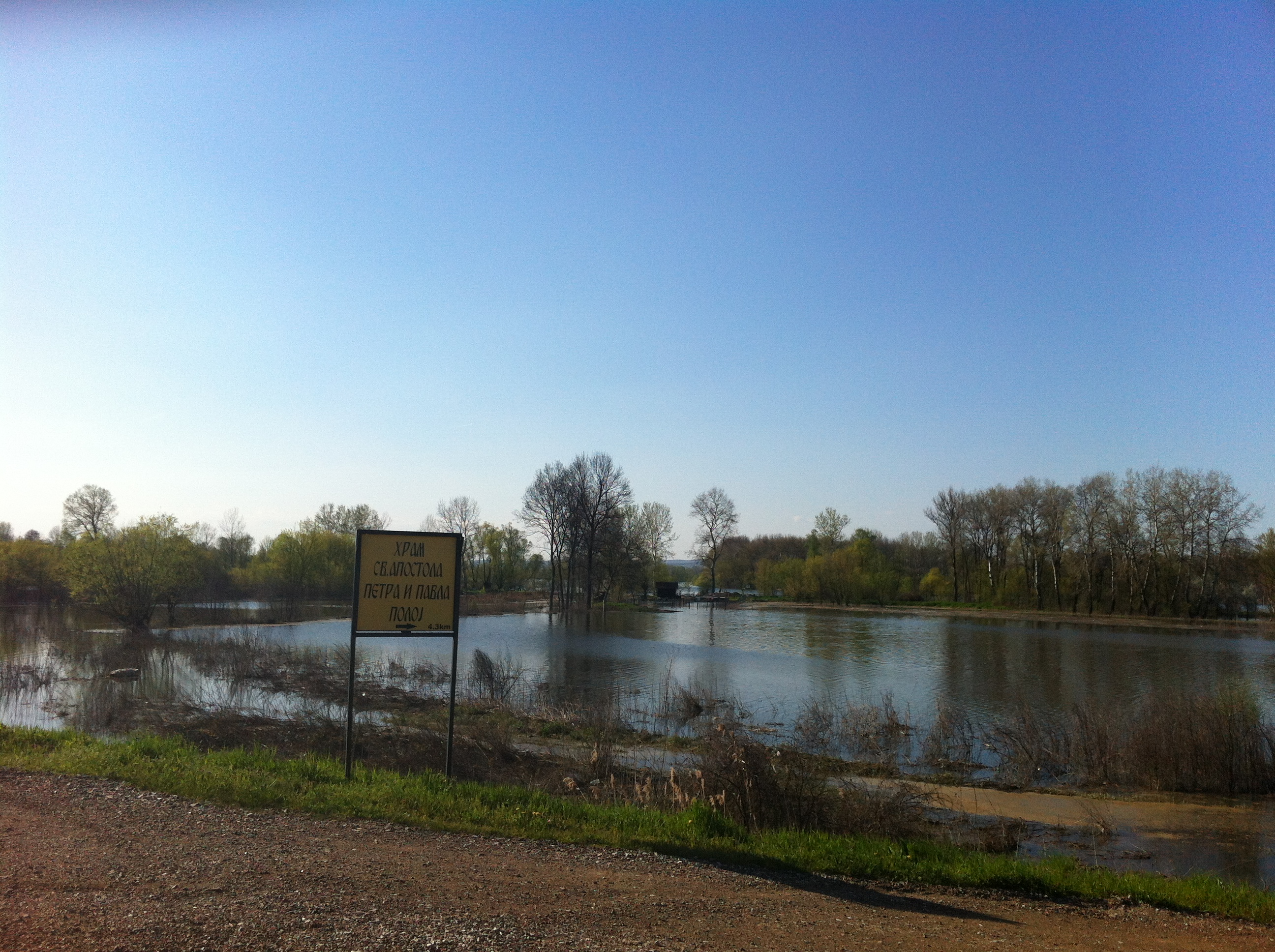
Nature in Brod

The area of Brod was inhabited since ancient times, which is testified by numerous artifacts from the Stone and Iron Age, as well as the Roman period.

Brod was first mentioned in 1691, during the Ottoman era as Turski Brod.

In 1878 Brod became a part of the Austro-Hungarian Empire, and got the official name of Bosanski Brod with the beginning of building of the railroad to Sarajevo. The first train departed towards Derventa in 1879, while the service was expanded to Doboj later in the same year.

Poet and writer Duško Trifunović was born in village Sijekovac near Brod in 1933. Brod's main river promenade, along the bank of the Sava, is named after him.

== Settlements ==
Aside from the town of Brod, the following settlements comprise the municipality:

- Brusnica Mala
- Brusnica Velika
- Donja Barica
- Donja Močila
- Donja Vrela
- Donje Kolibe
- Donji Klakar
- Gornja Barica
- Gornja Močila
- Gornja Vrela
- Gornje Kolibe
- Gornji Klakar
- Grk
- Koraće
- Kričanovo
- Kruščik
- Liješće
- Novo Selo
- Sijekovac
- Unka
- Vinska
- Zborište

== Demographics ==
=== Population ===
Population of settlements – Brod municipality
	Settlement	1931.	1948	1953.	1961.	1971.	1981.	1991.	2013.
	Total					30,115	32,286	33,744	16,619
1	Brod	7,386	4,993	5,329	7,350	10,003	12,506	14,098	7,961
2	Donja Močila							659	226
3	Donje Kolibe							837	219
4	Donji Klakar							583	407
5	Gornja Močila							717	220
6	Gornje Kolibe							1,407	723
7	Gornji Klakar							755	433
8	Grk							559	258
9	Koraće							2,022	1,151
10	Liješće							2,032	1,518
11	Novo Selo							2,953	982
12	Sijekovac							1,551	455
13	Vinska							561	282
14	Zborište							854	381

=== Ethnic composition ===
Ethnic composition – Brod town
Nationality	2013.	1991.	1981.	1971.
Total	7,961 (100,0%)	14,098 (100,0%)	12,506 (100,0%)	10,003 (100,0%)
Serbs	6,767 (85,00%)	4,373 (31,02%)	3,505 (28,03%)	3,229 (32,28%)
Bosniaks	521 (6,544%)	2,246 (15,93%)	1,682 (13,45%)	2,093 (20,92%)
Croats	404 (5,075%)	4,086 (28,98%)	3,812 (30,48%)	4,166 (41,65%)
Others	269 (3,379%)	633 (4,490%)	48 (0,384%)	86 (0,860%)
Yugoslavs		2 760 (19,58%)	3,406 (27,23%)	376 (3,759%)
Montenegrins			25 (0,200%)	24 (0,240%)
Slovenes			10 (0,080%)	10 (0,100%)
Macedonians			8 (0,064%)	3 (0,030%)
Albanians			6 (0,048%)	3 (0,030%)
Hungarians			4 (0,032%)	12 (0,120%)
Roma				1 (0,010%)

Ethnic composition – Brod municipality
Nationality	2013.	1991.	1981.	1971.
Total	16,619 (100,0%)	34,138 (100,0%)	32,286 (100,0%)	30,115 (100,0%)
Serbs	11,477 (69,06%)	11,389 (33,36%)	10,737 (33,26%)	11,273 (37,43%)
Croats	3,287 (19,78%)	13,993 (40,99%)	13,579 (42,06%)	14,489 (48,11%)
Bosniaks	1,509 (9,080%)	4,088 (11,97%)	3,106 (9,620%)	3,706 (12,31%)
Others	346 (2,082%)	1 004 (2,941%)	89 (0,276%)	146 (0,485%)
Yugoslavs		3,664 (10,73%)	4,704 (14,57%)	436 (1,448%)
Montenegrins			28 (0,087%)	30 (0,100%)
Macedonians			15 (0,046%)	3 (0,010%)
Slovenes			11 (0,034%)	13 (0,043%)
Albanians			11 (0,034%)	3 (0,010%)
Hungarians			6 (0,019%)	15 (0,050%)
Roma				1 (0,003%)

== Administrative areas ==
The Municipality of Brod according to population census from 1991, had twenty-three inhabited settlements, divided into twelve local communities:

=== City local communities ===
- MZ Brodsko Polje 1
- MZ Brodsko Polje 2
- MZ Brod - downtown
- MZ Karađorđevo
- MZ Rit
- MZ Tulek

=== Rural communities ===
- MZ Gornji Klakar
- MZ Donji Klakar
- MZ Gornje Kolibe
- MZ Donje Kolibe
- MZ Koraće
- MZ Liješće
- MZ Novo Selo
- MZ Sijekovac
- MZ Vinska
- MZ Unka
- MZ Gornja Vrela
- MZ Grk
- MZ Barica

== Notable residents ==
- Duško Trifunović, children's writer and poet
- Sead Mašić, football player
- Edin Mujčin, football player
- Ljupko Petrović, football coach
- Velibor Vidić, boxer, bronze medal winner for Bosnia and Herzegovina at the 2009 Mediterranean Games
- Zdravko Zovko, handball coach

== See also ==
- Municipalities of Republika Srpska
- Sijekovac killings
