= Radio HIT Brčko =

Bosnian radio station

Brčko; Bosnia and Herzegovina
- Broadcast area: Brčko District
- Frequencies: Majevica 89.6 MHz; Doboj 94.7 MHz
- RDS: RTV HIT

Programming
- Language: Serbian language
- Format: Local news, talk and music

Ownership
- Sister stations: TV HIT Brčko

History
- First air date: 1997

Technical information
- Licensing authority: CRA BiH
- Transmitter coordinates: 44°52′38″N 18°48′40″E
- Repeaters: Majevica/Udrigovo; Doboj/Čajre-Avdićevo brdo

Links
- Webcast: Listen Live
- Website: www.rtvhit.com

Radio HIT Brčko or Radio Hit is a Bosnian local commercial radio station, broadcasting from Brčko, Bosnia and Herzegovina. This radio station broadcasts a variety of programs such as folk, pop and rock music mix, as well as author's shows and news program.

Radio station is founded in 1997 by the company HIT d.o.o. Brčko which also operate TV HIT Brčko.

Program is mainly produced in Serbian language at two FM frequencies and it is available in the Brčko District, Posavina Canton and Semberija area as well as in nearby municipalities in Croatia.

Estimated number of listeners of Radio Hit is around 342.542.

== Frequencies ==
- Majevica 89.6 MHz
- Doboj 94.7 MHz

== See also ==
- List of radio stations in Bosnia and Herzegovina
- Radio Brčko
- BH Radio 1
- Radio postaja Odžak
- Radiopostaja Orašje
- Radio Preporod
- Obiteljski Radio Valentino
