= Radio Brčko =

Bosnian radio station

Radio-novinska i izdavačka ustanova (RNU) "Radio Brčko" Brčko distrikt BiH Радио-новинска и издавачка установа (РНУ) "Радио Брчко" Брчко дистрикт БиХ
- Brčko; Bosnia and Herzegovina
- Broadcast area: Brčko District
- Frequencies: Brčko 94.2 MHz; Brčko 92.8 MHz; Brčko 105.0 MHz
- Branding: Public

Programming
- Languages: Bosnian language Serbian language Croatian language
- Format: Local news, talk and music

Ownership
- Owner: RNU "Radio Brčko" Brčko Distrikt BiH

History
- First air date: 1960
- Call sign meaning: R BRCKO

Technical information
- Transmitter coordinates: 44°52′38″N 18°48′40″E
- Repeaters: Brčko/Bimal-Silos; Brčko/Skakava Gornja; Majevica/Udrigovo

Links
- Webcast: On website
- Website: www.radiobrcko.ba

Radio-novinska i izdavačka ustanova "Radio Brčko" Brčko distrikt BiH or RNU "Radio Brčko" is a Bosnian local public radio station, broadcasting from Brčko, Brčko District, Bosnia and Herzegovina. This radio station broadcasts a variety of programs such as music, sport, local news and talk shows. Program is produced in all three official languages of BiH: Bosnian language, Serbian language and Croatian language.

Radio Brčko was launched in 1960 by the municipal council of Brčko and it is the third oldest radio in Bosnia and Herzegovina. It was founded after Radio Sarajevo and Radio Tuzla. In Yugoslavia and in SR Bosnia and Herzegovina, it was part of local/municipal Radio Sarajevo network affiliate.

Estimated number of potential listeners of Radio Brčko is around 273,354.

Due to the favorable geographical position in Bosanska Posavina area, this radiostation is also available in municipalities: Orašje, Bosanski Šamac, Modriča, Odžak, Bosanski Brod, Bijeljina, Ugljevik, Lopare, Zvornik, Tuzla, Srebenik, Gradačac, Gračanica, Čelić and in neighboring Croatia (Osijek, Đakovo, Vinkovci, Vukovar, Beli Manastir, Slavonski Brod, Županja, Ilok) and Serbia (Loznica, Šid, Sremska Mitrovica, Bačka Palanka, Šabac).

== Frequencies ==
The program is currently broadcast on 3 frequencies:

- Brčko 94.2 MHz
- Udrigovo 92.8 MHz
- Skakava Gornja 105.0 MHz

== See also ==
- List of radio stations in Bosnia and Herzegovina
