= Novo Selo, Odžak =

Novo Selo
- Village
- Location within Bosnia and Herzegovina
- Coordinates: 45.0396418°N 18.3207316°E
- Country: Bosnia and Herzegovina
- Entity: Federation of Bosnia and Herzegovina; Republika Srpska
- Canton Region: Posavina; Doboj
- Municipality: Odžak; Vukosavlje

Area
  - Total: 6.27 sq mi (16.23 km^{2})

Population (2013)
  - Total: 1,605
  - Density: 256.1/sq mi (98.89/km^{2})
- Time zone: UTC+1 (CET)
  - Summer (DST): UTC+2 (CEST)

Novo Selo is a village in the municipalities of Odžak (Federation of Bosnia and Herzegovina) and Vukosavlje (Republika Srpska), Bosnia and Herzegovina. The etymology of the village comes from Slavic languages meaning new village, Novo Selo.

== Demographics ==
According to the 2013 census, its population was 1,605, all of them living in the Odžak part, thus none in the Vukosavlje part.

Ethnicity in 2013
Ethnicity	Number	Percentage
Croats	1,573	98.0%
Serbs	5	0.3%
Bosniaks	5	0.3%
other/undeclared	22	1.4%
Total	1,605	100%
