= Radio Preporod =

Bosnian radio station

Radio Preporod Odžački Radio Preporod
Odžak; Bosnia and Herzegovina
- Broadcast area: Posavina Canton
- Frequency: Odžak 95.2 MHz

Programming
- Language: Bosnian language
- Format: Local news, talk and music

Ownership
- Owner: Radio Preporod d.o.o. Odžak

History
- First air date: October 6, 1997

Technical information
- Transmitter coordinates: 45°0′38″N 18°19′35″E
- Repeater: Odžak/Ulica Redže Škangića 17

Links
- Webcast: Online, on Website
- Website: www.radiopreporod.com

Radio Preporod or Odžački Radio Preporod is a Bosnian local commercial radio station, broadcasting from Odžak, Bosnia and Herzegovina.

Radio Odžak was launched on 6 October 1997 by local company Radio Preporod d.o.o. Odžak. This radio station broadcasts a variety of programs such as news, music, morning and talk shows. Program is mainly produced in Bosnian language. The radio is also a sponsor of local cultural events, and popular programs are dedicated to the "Musini Dani" event, which is held in honor of the birth of prominent Bosnian poet Musa Ćazim Ćatić, who was born in Odžak.

Estimated number of potential listeners of Radio Preporod is around 50.742. Radiostation is also available in Bosanska Posavina area and in neighboring Croatia.

== Frequencies ==
- Odžak 95.2 MHz

== See also ==
- List of radio stations in Bosnia and Herzegovina
- Radio postaja Odžak
- Radiopostaja Orašje
