= Vrbovac, Bosnia and Herzegovina =

Village in Bosnia and herzegovina in Bosnia and Herzegovina Region Federacija Bosna

Vrbovac врбовац врбовац
- Village in Bosnia and herzegovina
- Location within Bosnia and Herzegovina
- Coordinates: 45.0680225°N 18.2505225°E
- Country: Bosnia and Herzegovina
- Entity: Federation of Bosnia and Herzegovina; Republika Srpska
- Canton Region: Posavina; Doboj
- Municipality: Odžak; Vukosavlje

Area
  - Total: 6.07 sq mi (15.71 km^{2})

Population (2013)
  - Total: 1,035
  - Density: 170.6/sq mi (65.88/km^{2})
- Time zone: UTC+1 (CET)
  - Summer (DST): UTC+2 (CEST)

Vrbovac is a village in the municipalities of Odžak (Federation of Bosnia and Herzegovina) and Vukosavlje (Republika Srpska), Bosnia and Herzegovina.

== Demographics ==
According to the 2013 census, its population was 1,035, with 1,015 living in the Odžak part and 20 in the Vukosavlje part.

Ethnicity in 2013
Ethnicity	Number	Percentage
Croats	990	95.7%
Serbs	27	2.6%
Bosniaks	1	0.1%
other/undeclared	17	1.6%
Total	1,035	100%
