= Ivo Fabijan =

Croatian pop singer (1950–2006)

- Born: Ivo Mrvelj; 25 August 1950; Vrbovac, PR Bosnia and Herzegovina, FPR Yugoslavia
- Died: 16 July 2006 (aged 55); Zagreb, Croatia
- Occupation: Singer
- Years active: 1974–2006
- Awards: Order of Danica Hrvatska

Ivo Fabijan (born Andrija Ivo Mrvelj; 25 August 1950 – 16 July 2006) was a Croatian musician, singer and composer, and produced pop music and patriotic songs.

Fabijan was born in Vrbovac, Odžak, Bosnia and Herzegovina (then part of Yugoslavia). He is well known for singing patriotic Croatian music beginning in the early 1980s, when Croatia was still part of communist Yugoslavia and was active musically through the Croatian War of Independence. His origin is from Posušje. He died in Zagreb, Croatia in 2006.

== Discography ==
- Ja sam takav čovjek (Croatia Records, 2000)

=== Selected singles ===
- "Otvori, Marija, vrata"
- "Nemojte mi spominjati nju"
- "Kad sklopim oči, ja Hrvatsku sanjam"
- "Hercegovino"
- "Od Duvna do Međugorja"
- "Zov Hercegovine"
- "Himna Posusje"
- "Kreni Gardo"
- "Moj stric je bio Ustaša"
- "Striče Ivane"
