= Posavina (disambiguation) =

Posavina may refer to:

- Posavina, a geographical region around river Sava in Croatia, Bosnia and Herzegovina, and Serbia
- Brod-Posavina County, a county in Croatia
- Posavina Canton, a canton in Bosnia and Herzegovina
