= Kopanice =

- Village
- Location within Bosnia and Herzegovina
- Coordinates: 44.9903186°N 18.7427491°E
- Country: Bosnia and Herzegovina
- Entity: Federation of Bosnia and Herzegovina
- Canton: Posavina
- Municipality: Orašje

Area
  - Total: 8.76 sq mi (22.68 km^{2})

Population (2013)
  - Total: 768
  - Density: 87.7/sq mi (33.9/km^{2})
- Time zone: UTC+1 (CET)
  - Summer (DST): UTC+2 (CEST)

Kopanice is a village in the municipality of Orašje, Bosnia and Herzegovina.

== Demographics ==
According to the 2013 census, its population was 768.

Ethnicity in 2013
Ethnicity	Number	Percentage
Croats	756	98.4%
Serbs	11	1.4%
other/undeclared	1	0.1%
Total	768	100%
