= Radio postaja Odžak =

Bosnian radio station

Radio postaja Odžak Radio Odžak
- Odžak; Bosnia and Herzegovina
- Broadcast area: Posavina Canton
- Frequency: Odžak 92.5 MHz
- Branding: Public

Programming
- Language: Croatian
- Format: Local news, talk and music

Ownership
- Owner: JP RADIO POSTAJA ODŽAK d.o.o.

History
- First air date: 1967

Technical information
- Transmitter coordinates: 45°0′38″N 18°19′35″E
- Repeater: Odžak/Neboder-Ul. Titova

Links
- Webcast: On website
- Website: www.radioodzak.com

Radio postaja Odžak or Radio Odžak is a Bosnian local public radio station, broadcasting from Odžak, Bosnia and Herzegovina.

In 1967, Radio Odžak was launched by the municipal council. In Yugoslavia and in SR Bosnia and Herzegovina, it was part of local/municipal Radio Sarajevo network affiliate.

This radio station broadcasts a variety of programs such as news, music, morning and talk shows. Program is mainly produced in Croatian from 7:00 am to 9:00 pm. Estimated number of potential listeners of Radio Odžak is around 57,163. Radiostation is also available in Bosanska Posavina area and in neighboring Croatia.

== Frequencies ==
- Odžak 92.5 MHz

== See also ==
- List of radio stations in Bosnia and Herzegovina
- Radio Preporod
- Radiopostaja Orašje
