= Posavska Mahala =

- Village
- Location within Bosnia and Herzegovina
- Coordinates: 45.0542535°N 18.3051752°E
- Country: Bosnia and Herzegovina
- Entity: Federation of Bosnia and Herzegovina
- Canton: Posavina
- Municipality: Odžak

Area
  - Total: 2.58 sq mi (6.68 km^{2})

Population (2013)
  - Total: 849
  - Density: 329/sq mi (127/km^{2})
- Time zone: UTC+1 (CET)
  - Summer (DST): UTC+2 (CEST)

Posavska Mahala is a village in the municipality of Odžak, Posavina Canton, Bosnia and Herzegovina.

== Demographics ==
According to the 2013 census, its population was 849.

== History ==
Before World War II, the village was called Vlaška Mala, and during the war it was a strong Ustashe stronghold.

Ethnicity in 2013
Ethnicity	Number	Percentage
Croats	835	98.4%
Serbs	4	0.5%
Bosniaks	2	0.2%
other/undeclared	8	0.9%
Total	849	100%
