= Gornji Svilaj =

- Village
- Location within Bosnia and Herzegovina
- Coordinates: 45.1089633°N 18.2029076°E
- Country: Bosnia and Herzegovina
- Entity: Federation of Bosnia and Herzegovina
- Canton: Posavina
- Municipality: Odžak

Area
  - Total: 6.46 sq mi (16.74 km^{2})

Population (2013)
  - Total: 673
  - Density: 104/sq mi (40.2/km^{2})
- Time zone: UTC+1 (CET)
  - Summer (DST): UTC+2 (CEST)

Gornji Svilaj is a village in the municipality of Odžak, Bosnia and Herzegovina.

== Demographics ==
According to the 2013 census, its population was 673.

Ethnicity in 2013
Ethnicity	Number	Percentage
Croats	642	95.4%
Serbs	24	3.6%
Bosniaks	2	0.3%
other/undeclared	5	0.7%
Total	673	100%
