= Gornja Dubica =

- Village
- Location in Bosnia and Herzegovina
- Coordinates: 45.0538569°N 18.3762323°E
- Country: Bosnia and Herzegovina
- Entity: Federation of Bosnia and Herzegovina
- Canton: Posavina
- Municipality: Odžak

Area
  - Total: 4.26 sq mi (11.04 km^{2})

Population (2013)
  - Total: 918
  - Density: 215/sq mi (83.2/km^{2})
- Time zone: UTC+1 (CET)
  - Summer (DST): UTC+2 (CEST)

Gornja Dubica is a village in the municipality of Odžak, Bosnia and Herzegovina.

== Demographics ==
According to the 2013 census, its population was 918.

Ethnicity in 2013
Ethnicity	Number	Percentage
Croats	913	99.5%
Serbs	4	0.4%
Bosniaks	1	0.1%
Total	918	100%
