= Vidovice =

Village in Bosnia and Herzegovina

- Village
- Location within Bosnia and Herzegovina
- Coordinates: 44.9872566°N 18.7269926°E
- Country: Bosnia and Herzegovina
- Entity: Federation of Bosnia and Herzegovina
- Canton: Posavina
- Municipality: Orašje

Area
  - Total: 5.34 sq mi (13.84 km^{2})

Population (2013)
  - Total: 1,678
  - Density: 314.0/sq mi (121.2/km^{2})
- Time zone: UTC+1 (CET)
  - Summer (DST): UTC+2 (CEST)

Vidovice is a village in the municipality of Orašje, Bosnia and Herzegovina.

== Demographics ==
According to the 2013 census, its population was 1,678.

Ethnicity in 2013
Ethnicity	Number	Percentage
Croats	1,667	99.3%
Bosniaks	3	0.2%
Serbs	1	0.1%
other/undeclared	7	0.4%
Total	1,678	100%
