= Operation Angela =

Code name of the Croatian Defence Council operation

- Part of the Bosnian War and the Croatian War of Independence
Date	5 November 1993
Location	Odžak Bosnia and Herzegovina, Croatia
Result	Army of Republika Srpska victory: Odžak Successfully defended; Croat Operation aborted

Commanders and leaders
(Republika Srpska) Mile Beronja	Toma Božić

Units involved
Army of Republika Srpska	Croatian Defence Council

Strength
(Republika Srpska) Unknown	175

Casualties and losses
(Republika Srpska) None	11 killed, 7 captured
- Croatian villages shelled

Operation Angela was the code name of the Croatian Defence Council (HVO) operation to retake Odžak from the Army of Republika Srpska (VRS) on 5 November 1993 during the Bosnian War. The HVO operation was suspended due to a lack of soldiers and a counterattack by the Army of Republika Srpska. Long after the fall of Odžak, HVO fighters from Odžak were in Orašje stationed at the Orašije-Šamača front line. For months, they asked the assembly area to release Odžak, but never received permission. The HVO knew that the VRS did not have any strong forces in the area and that liberation was feasible.

== The Operation ==
The Croatian Defence Council (HVO) crossed the Sava river in boats and set out to retake the occupied territory. On the foggy night of 5 November 1993, 175 members of the HVO's 102nd Infantry Brigade under the command of Tom Božić forced their way to the Sava in the territory of the Republic of Croatia in an attempt to liberate Odžak. They crossed the Sava and entered the territory of Odžak municipality. In some places, the army penetrated up to 10 km deep due to no Serbian resistance. However, Serbian action was not absent. Slavonian villages were shelled for revenge. Serbian infantry forces from the reserve were raised to a higher level of readiness and for a greater reaction. The reinforcement of the Army of Republika Srpska (VRS) was coming and threatening to strike. In reaction, members of the brigade called for them to abandon the plan, that is, on the orders of their superiors on the other side of the Sava, they must return. In addition, because of that action, the lives of Croatian civilians from Kakanj and Vareš who found refugees in Republika Srpska after Muslim forces drove them out of their homes came into question. Among other things, that is why the decision was made to abandon this action. Afterwards, the 102nd Infantry Brigade stayed in Orašje for 3 years and never received orders to leave. 11 members of the HVO were killed in action, and 7 members were captured.
