= Radiopostaja Orašje =

Bosnian radio station

Radio postaja Orašje Radio Orašje
Orašje; Bosnia and Herzegovina
- Broadcast area: Posavina Canton
- Frequencies: Orašje 88.0 MHz; Orašje 105.8 MHz
- Branding: Public

Programming
- Languages: Croatian language Bosnian language
- Format: Local news, talk and music

Ownership
- Owner: JP Radiopostaja Orašje d.o.o.

History
- First air date: February 1978
- Call sign meaning: Glazbeno srce Posavine; Radiopostaja Orašja - naš radio

Technical information
- Transmitter coordinates: 45°2′10″N 18°41′36″E
- Repeaters: Orašje/Kostrč; Gradačac/Tupalića brdo

Links
- Webcast: On website
- Website: www.radioorasje.com

Radio postaja Orašje or Radio Orašje is a Bosnian local public radio station, broadcasting from Orašje, Bosnia and Herzegovina.

In February 1978, Radio Orašje was launched by the municipal council. In Yugoslavia and in SR Bosnia and Herzegovina, it was part of local/municipal Radio Sarajevo network affiliate.

This radio station broadcasts a variety of programs such as news, music, morning and talk shows. Program is mainly produced in Croatian and Bosnian language. Estimated number of potential listeners of Radio Orašje is around 189,260. Radiostation is also available in Bosanska Posavina, Tuzla Canton and Brčko District area as well as in neighboring Croatia.

== Frequencies ==
- Orašje 88.0 MHz
- Orašje 105.8 MHz

== See also ==
- List of radio stations in Bosnia and Herzegovina
- Radio Preporod
- Radio postaja Odžak
