= Sevnica Castle =

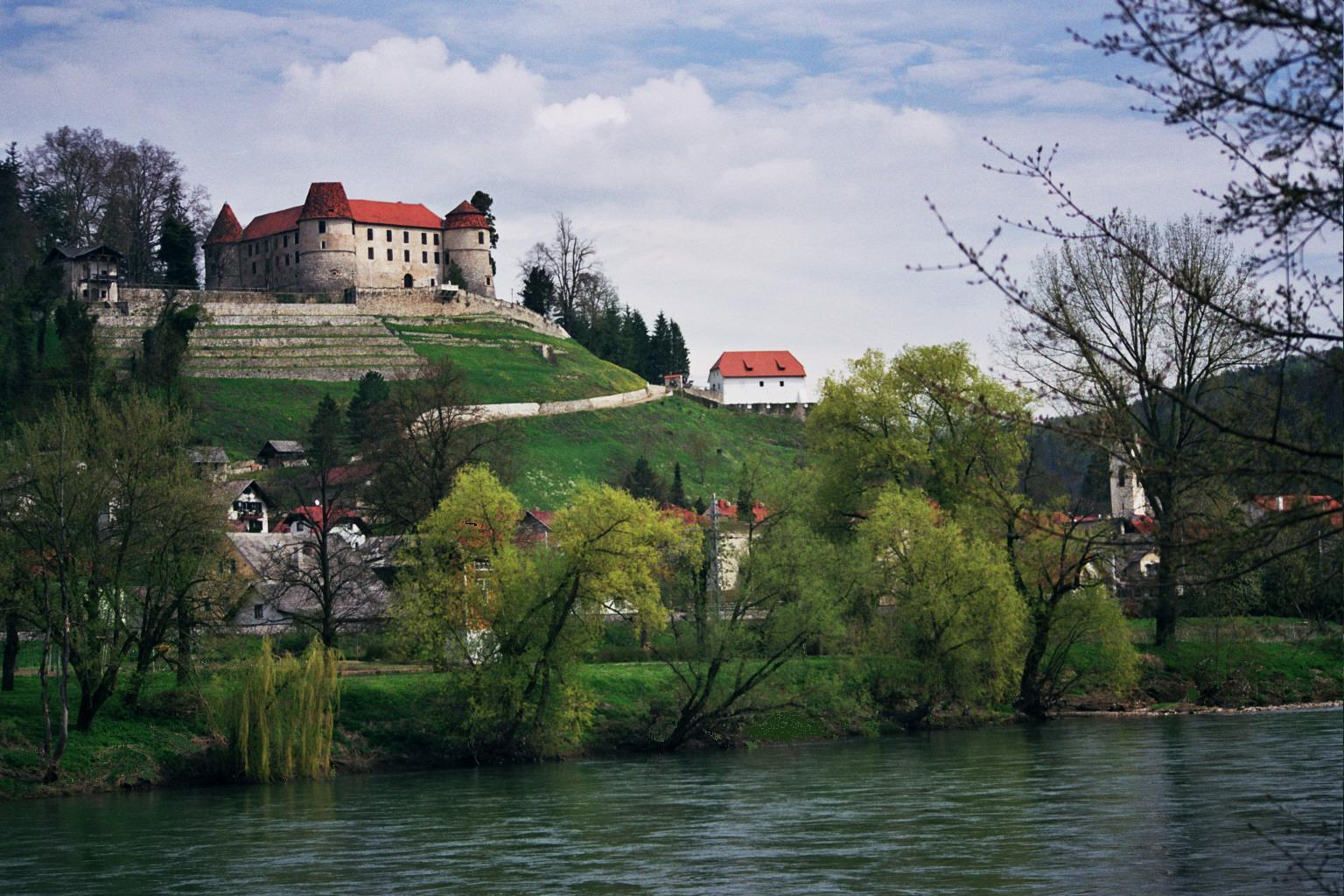
Sevnica Castle and Lutheran Cellar

Sevnica Castle is a Slovenian castle in the Lower Sava Valley. Situated atop a hill, it dominates the old town of Sevnica and offers views of the surrounding countryside.

== History ==
The Archdiocese of Salzburg held local estates since 1043 and Sevnica Castle was mentioned for the first time in its record in 1309 like “Castellum" Lichtenwald. The origin of the building was not documented but it was most probably built during the bishopric of Konrad the First von Abensberg (1106–1147), who rebuilt and colonized this area devastated by Hungarian invasions in the 10th century and in the beginning of the 12th century. We know nothing even about the appearance of the building at that time. The only remaining part of the building from that period, which has survived until this day, is the part of a tower nowadays included in the left wing of the castle. This tower did not stand by itself; it was probably part of a larger building. From the thickness of its walls (2.6 metres (8.5 ft)) it is believed to have been four or five storeys tall.

The office of the Archdiocese of Salzburg had been in the castle until 1479 when was appointed Archbishop Bernard II von Rohr, who came into conflict with Emperor Frederick the Third. During the ensuing war, Bernard established alliance with the governor of Hungary Matthias Hunyady – Corvinus and he resigned to his custody not only Sevnica Castle with the belonging manor but also many other present-day Slovenian castles in Styria and Carinthia. Matthias Hunyadi, whose army thereafter occupied considerable part of the Slovenian ethnic territory, was very popular with simple folk. Thanks to this, many stories about him were passed on by oral tradition and so he became Slovenian legendary King Matthias. After his death, the Peace of Pressburg in 1491 concluded the war and Sevnica Castle with its manor then became the possession of the emperor, but the new Emperor Maximilian the First returned it in 1494 to the Archdiocese of Salzburg.

In 1938, Viktor Tiller claimed that in the Middle Ages the castle was connected by a tunnel with Lower Castle in Sevnica, and that the inhabitants of the town usd this tunnel as a hiding place during Ottoman invasions.

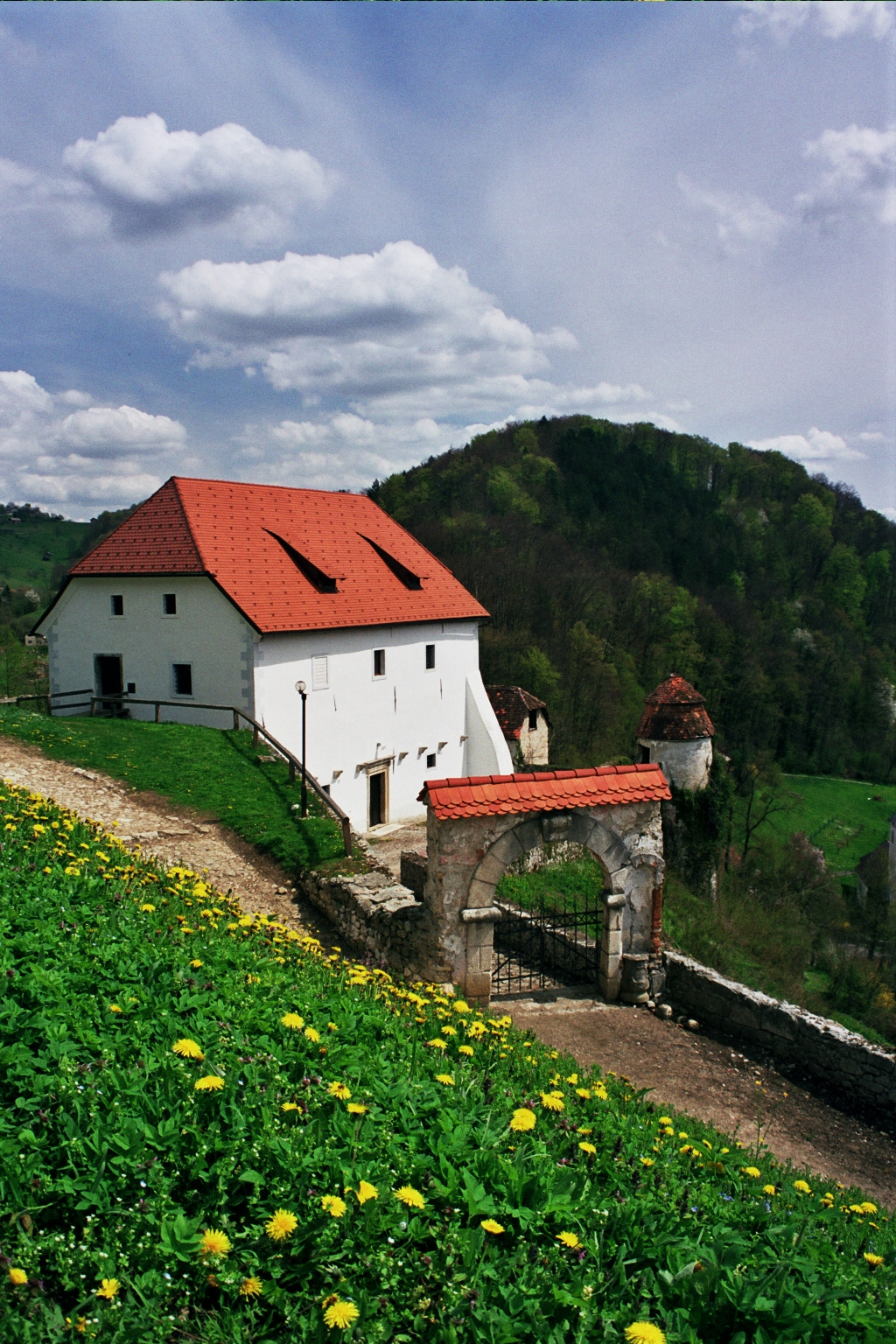
Lutheran Cellar

In the middle of the 16th century the so-called Lutheran Cellar was built at the southeast side of Castle Hill (46°0′28.18″N 15°18′55.62″E). Its construction had not been documented but it was possible to determine an approximate time of its erection according to architectural style. Besides, its interior is embellished with frescos dating to the second half of the 16th century, which are one of the finest surviving paintings in Slovenia from that period.

Although by appearance flat and featureless farm building, Lutheran Cellar had certainly been designed architecturally as a clandestine Lutheran chapel and its appearance served as a perfect cover. Who built it here at the castle grounds owned by the Archdiocese of Salzburg? Was it possible that any of the manor administrators or tenants at that time was a Protestant?

In the parish church in Sevnica the tombstone is preserved from the family vault of the manor administrator Oswald Geriacher, which depicts him and his wife Dorothea kneeling in front of the crucifix. Oswald was buried in the church after his death on June 2, 1575. However, one of the fundamentals of Lutheran religion is the belief that the humankind can gain redemption owing to the Christ's death on the cross, and this kind of motif is a characteristic of Lutheran tombstones, while the Catholics prefer the motif of a patron saint. Therefore, it may be said that the manor administrator Geriacher was obviously a Protestant and most probably he erected Lutheran Cellar. The fact that he was buried in the church which was Catholic could be only the proof how widespread the Protestantism was at Sevnica and even inside the Catholic Church. It was not unusual at all, if a parish priest sympathized with the Protestantism. Primož Trubar, the central figure among Slovenian Protestants, served at the beginning of his career also as a Catholic priest and not far from Sevnica. He was from 1530 until 1542 a parish priest at St. Helen's Parish at Loka near Zidani Most. Slovenian Protestants elevated Slovene in the 16th century among written languages and gave this nation the earliest literary works. In those days, there was no national consciousness so they worked hand in hand with German Protestants. Their common aim was reform of the church and religious life, so the liturgy in Lutheran Cellar was most probably conducted in both languages. One of the most prominent Slovenian Protestants of that time was Jurij Dalmatin, the first translator of the Bible into Slovene and a native of Krško. It was quite probable that he occasionally visited Lutheran Cellar at Sevnica.

In consequence of the tyranny and oppression of the nobles, the rebellion of Croatian and Slovenian peasantry broke out toward the end of 1572. It continued for two months and on February 5, 1573, the group of about six hundred insurgents came in Sevnica under the leadership of Ilija Gregorić. Tenant of the manor was at that time Baron Bolthazar von Lamberg, who rescued the castle and himself by a masterful move. He invited the rebellious peasants in the castle and treated them to a feast. Thanks to a combination of circumstances, the peasants set out soon after the feast and pursued their rebellious journey towards Lisca. However, the baron would certainly not avert this impending danger this way, had he not shown kindness to his own peasants before.

Until 1595, the development of the edifice of Sevnica Castle had not been documented, so we could not know how the castle looked like when Innocenz Moscon bought it in this year. The family Moscon, who acquired considerable wealth by skilful trading, was of Italian origin and they possessed also many other present-day Slovenian castles: Krško Castle, Podsreda Castle, Ortnek Castle, Pišece Castle, and others. The matters about the purchase of Sevnica Castle were not clear and Innocenz incurred long litigation for the recognition of the ownership. However, when the conflict was finally resolved in 1637, the castle remained the property of Salzburg Archdiocese, while Moscons obtained the right of hereditary tenure. Between 1595 and 1597, Innocenz rebuilt the castle in then contemporary Late-Renaissance style and gave it thus its present form. The medieval tower remained practically untouched and was included in the east residential wing.. Innocenz was a stern Catholic, yet one could hardly avoid concluding that Lutheran Cellar was preserved thanks to him. It would be certainly demolished during the following centuries, had he not turned it into his family vault in which he and his wife Anna were buried.

The castle remained the ownership of the Archdiocese of Salzburg until 1803, but in the meantime, the Auersperg family inherited the tenure in 1675, then the Drašković family in 1688, in 1725 again Auersperg and in 1769 the Keglević family.

One of the fresco paintings in the church of St. Lawrence at the village Žabjek depicts the fire at the castle ignited during one of the thunderstorms in 1778 by a stroke of lightning at the watchtower standing west of the castle. This fresco is the last preserved representation of the castle with its mediaeval tower rising above the rest of the building. The tower was most probably levelled with the east residential wing soon after the fire.

Annals recorded another atmospheric turmoil on June 26, 1801, when a raging hailstorm accompanied by gale-force winds devastated this area. At Sevnica Castle, it broke all window-panes, uncovered two corner-towers and another building standing beside the castle, two people were also fatally injured by this.

That same year from February 2 to May 7, the so-called German Infantry Regiment under the command of Colonel Durand was stationed at Sevnica. Sergeant Johann Michael Fischer, native of Malterdingen in Baden, committed a homicide here and was, after a trial in Sevnica Castle, on March 12 shot in the presence of the whole regiment.

Roughly two years later, on June 1, 1803, Count Johann Händl von Rebenburg became the proprietor of Sevnica Castle. He rearranged the nearby exterior of it: he lowered the battlements, filled in the moats, planted the trees in the park around the castle and made a vineyard with terraces at the south side of the castle hill. Among the citizens of Sevnica have been preserved by oral transmission some local legends about the generosity of Count Händl and about his beautiful park laid out in Renaissance-Baroque style. It is also preserved the land-register from 1825 incorporating the ground plan of the castle and its park.

In the 19th century, some alterations were also made to Lutheran Cellar. There are still visible stony supports at the façade of it, which have once most probably born a pergola. It was impossible to find out, when was this pergola removed, but in the 19th century, a wine cellar, with its roof propped by these supports, was built at the courtyard.

In the second half of the 19th century, the castle changed many owners. Among them was Dr. Karel Ausserer, who bought it in 1880 and built at the north side of the castle hill the road to the castle.

Between 1910 and 1945, the proprietress of Sevnica Castle was Countess Mathilde von Arco-Zinneberg. She made use of Lutheran Cellar again as the burial place, when she laid to rest in it her husband Arthur Tränkel and their daughter Kitty. The citizens of Sevnica preserved in their memory that the castle contained many antiquities and other valuable things at that time, but during the Second World War, the countess left the castle with all its fabulous wealth in hands of an administrator and moved to Italy.

As many other castles in Slovenia, even Sevnica Castle was nationalized after the war and the precious furniture, which remained untouched until then, vanished. Poor families without apartments of their own were accommodated in the castle and they contributed to the ruination of its property. The park was in a state of total neglect and nobody cared about the vineyard anymore, so even the wine cellar beside Lutheran Cellar was not needed and was removed.

The attitudes towards this kind of legacy slowly changed in the sixties. The poor families were gradually removed from the castle and it began receiving new contents. The consciousness about the importance of Lutheran Cellar was also awakening and its frescos, depicting motifs from the Bible, were between 1963 and 1973 restored. At about the same time, Baroque fresco paintings depicting gallant motifs of four seasons were discovered in the southeast tower of the castle. Slovenian art historian Ivan Komelj has dated them into the 17th century. They were restored between 1977 and 1979.

== Sevnica Castle today ==
Below the outer east castle wall there are late Romanesque cornerstones on the tower; these are traces of the earliest, medieval period of the castle. A German inscription meaning 'patience overcomes everything' above the castle door was added by Innocenz Moscon during his litigation for the recognition of the ownership of the castle. His renovations still characterize the castle today. A Roman tombstone depicting a couple in a medallion is built into the wall on the right side of the doorway. Count Johann Händl von Rebenburg brought it here from Ajdovski Gradec, and he laid out the castle park and gardens. Some of the grapevines that he planted on the south side of the castle hill were still growing in the 1970s. The south side of the castle hill was cleared in 2005, and the terraces were planted with fruit trees. The park around the castle is in poor shape. A plan to restore it as it existed in 1825 was drawn up in 1966 but never carried out.

The second floor of the south wing contains Neo-Renaissance furnishings mostly from the 19th century, and there is a conference hall and wedding hall. The second floor of the southeast tower contains Baroque frescos. A Renaissance-Baroque private chapel on the first floor of the southwest tower contains an altar from 1637 dedicated to St. George. The castle hosts regular exhibitions, a school museum, a fire-fighting museum, an exile museum, and the Ornamental Arts Gallery of Ivan Razboršek. The castle's Lutheran Cellar is known for its acoustics, and various concerts and other performances take place in it.

== Gallery ==
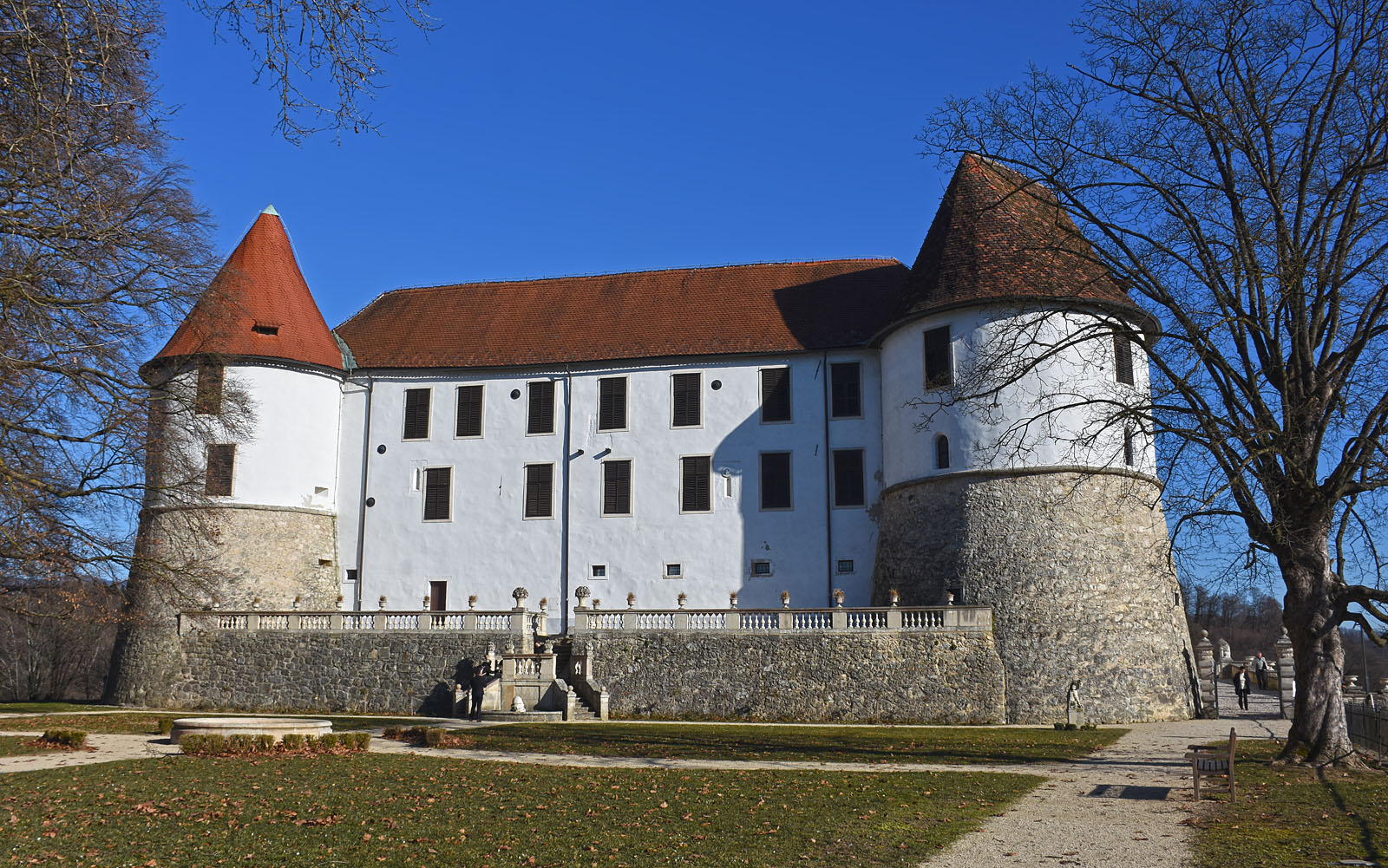
Sevnica Castle from the west

== Literature ==
- Bogo Grafenauer; Kmečki upori na Slovenskem, (Ljubljana, 1962).
- Josef Andreas Janisch; Topographischestatistisches Lexikon von Steiermark mit Historischen Notizen und Anmerkungen (Graz, 1885).
- Ivan Komelj; Sevniški grad in Lutrovska klet, Kulturni in naravni spomeniki Slovenije 20, (Ljubljana, 1969).
- Carl Schumtz; Historisch Topographisches Lexikon von Steyermark (Graz, 1822).
- France Stele; »Vloga reformacije v naši umetnostni zgodovini«. Drugi Trubarjev zbornik, ed. Mirko Rupel, (Ljubljana, 1952).
- Peter Petru; Thilo Ulbert; Vranje pri Sevnici, Starokrščanske cerkve na Ajdovskem gradcu; Vranje bei Sevnica, Fruhchristliche Kirchenanlagen auf dem Ajdovski Gradec; Katalogi in monografije 12 (Ljubljana, 1975).
- Hans Pirchegger; Untersteiermark in der Geschichte ihrer Herrschaften un Gülten, Städte und Märkte (München, 1962).
- Ivan Stopar; Grajske stavbe v vzhodni Sloveniji, peta knjiga, Med Kozjanskim in porečjem Save (Ljubljana, 1993).
- Viktor Tiller; Sevnica in okolica, (Ljubljana, 1938).

== Sources ==
- Milko Kos; Urbarji salzburške nadškofije, Srednjeveški urbarji za Slovenijo 1 (Ljubljana, 1939).
