= Potočani, Odžak =

Potočani
- Village
- Location within Bosnia and Herzegovina
- Coordinates: 45.043487°N 18.2651566°E
- Country: Bosnia and Herzegovina
- Entity: Federation of Bosnia and Herzegovina
- Canton: Posavina
- Municipality: Odžak

Area
  - Total: 22.48 km^{2} (8.68 sq mi)

Population (2013)
  - Total: 1,520
  - Density: 67.6/km^{2} (175/sq mi)
- Time zone: UTC+1 (CET)
  - Summer (DST): UTC+2 (CEST)

Potočani is a village in the Municipality of Odžak in Posavina Canton of the Federation of Bosnia and Herzegovina, an entity of Bosnia and Herzegovina.

== Demographics ==
According to the 2013 census, its population was 1,332.

Ethnicity in 2013
Ethnicity	Number	Percentage
Croats	1,502	98.8%
Serbs	7	0.5%
Bosniaks	5	0.3%
other/undeclared	6	0.4%
Total	1,520	100%
