= List of heads of the Posavina Canton =

Prime Minister of Posavina Canton
- Premijer Posavskog kantona
- Coat of arms of Posavina Canton
- Incumbent; Đuro Topić since 30 January 2019
- Appointer: Posavina Cantonal Assembly
- Inaugural holder: Ivo Vincetić (as governor); Neven Đukić (as prime minister)
- Formation: 1996

This is a list of heads of the Posavina Canton.

== Heads of the Posavina Canton (1996–present) ==
Croatian Democratic Union

=== Governors ===
№	Portrait	Name (Born–Died)	Term of Office		Party
1		Ivo Vincetić (1962–)	1996	December 1996	HDZ BiH
2		Pavo Kobaš (1948–)	December 1996	1998	HDZ BiH
3		Krunoslav Vuković	1998	15 January 2001	HDZ BiH
4		Mijo Matanović (1965–)	15 January 2001	6 October 2002	HDZ BiH

=== Prime Ministers ===
№	Portrait	Name (Born–Died)	Term of Office		Party
1		Neven Đukić	1996	1998	HDZ BiH
2		Slavo Bago (1959–)	1998	6 February 2001	HDZ BiH
3		Ivo Vincetić (1962–)	6 February 2001	9 January 2007	HDZ BiH
4		Mijo Matanović (1965–)	9 January 2007	15 April 2011	HDZ BiH
5		Marijan Oršolić (1965–)	15 April 2011	26 March 2015	HDZ BiH
6		Marijan Klaić (1963–)	26 March 2015	30 January 2019	HDZ BiH
7		Đuro Topić (1972–)	30 January 2019	Incumbent	HDZ BiH
