= TV HIT =

- Country: Bosnia and Herzegovina
- Broadcast area: Brčko
- Headquarters: Brčko District

Programming
- Language(s): Bosnian
- Picture format: 4:3 576i SDTV

Ownership
- Owner: Preduzeće za radio - difuznu, proizvodnu i trgovinsku djelatnost "Hit" d.o.o. Brčko
- Key people: Jovica Panić (General director)

History
- Launched: 1999

Links
- Website: www.rtvhit.com

Availability

Terrestrial
- Terrestrial signal: Brčko District area

TV HIT or HIT Televizija is a Bosnian commercial television channel based in Brčko District, Bosnia and Herzegovina. The program is mainly produced in Bosnian. TV station was established in 1999. Local radio station Radio HIT is also part of this company.
