= Skakava Gornja =

Skakava Gornja Скакава Горња
- Village
- Location within Bosnia and Herzegovina
- Coordinates: 44°47′08″N 18°35′50″E
- Country: Bosnia and Herzegovina
- Entity: Brčko District

Area
  - Total: 6.11 sq mi (15.83 km^{2})

Population (2013)
  - Total: 1,352
  - Density: 221.2/sq mi (85.41/km^{2})
- Time zone: UTC+1 (CET)
  - Summer (DST): UTC+2 (CEST)

Skakava Gornja (Serbian Cyrillic: Скакава Горња) is a village in the municipality of Brčko, Bosnia and Herzegovina.

== Demographics ==
According to the 2013 census, its population was 1,352.

Ethnicity in 2013
Ethnicity	Number	Percentage
Croats	1,316	97.3%
Serbs	14	1.0%
Bosniaks	12	0.9%
other/undeclared	10	0.7%
Total	1,352	100%
