= Lower Sava Valley =

Region of southern Slovenia

Coordinates: 45°57′0″N 15°29′0″E

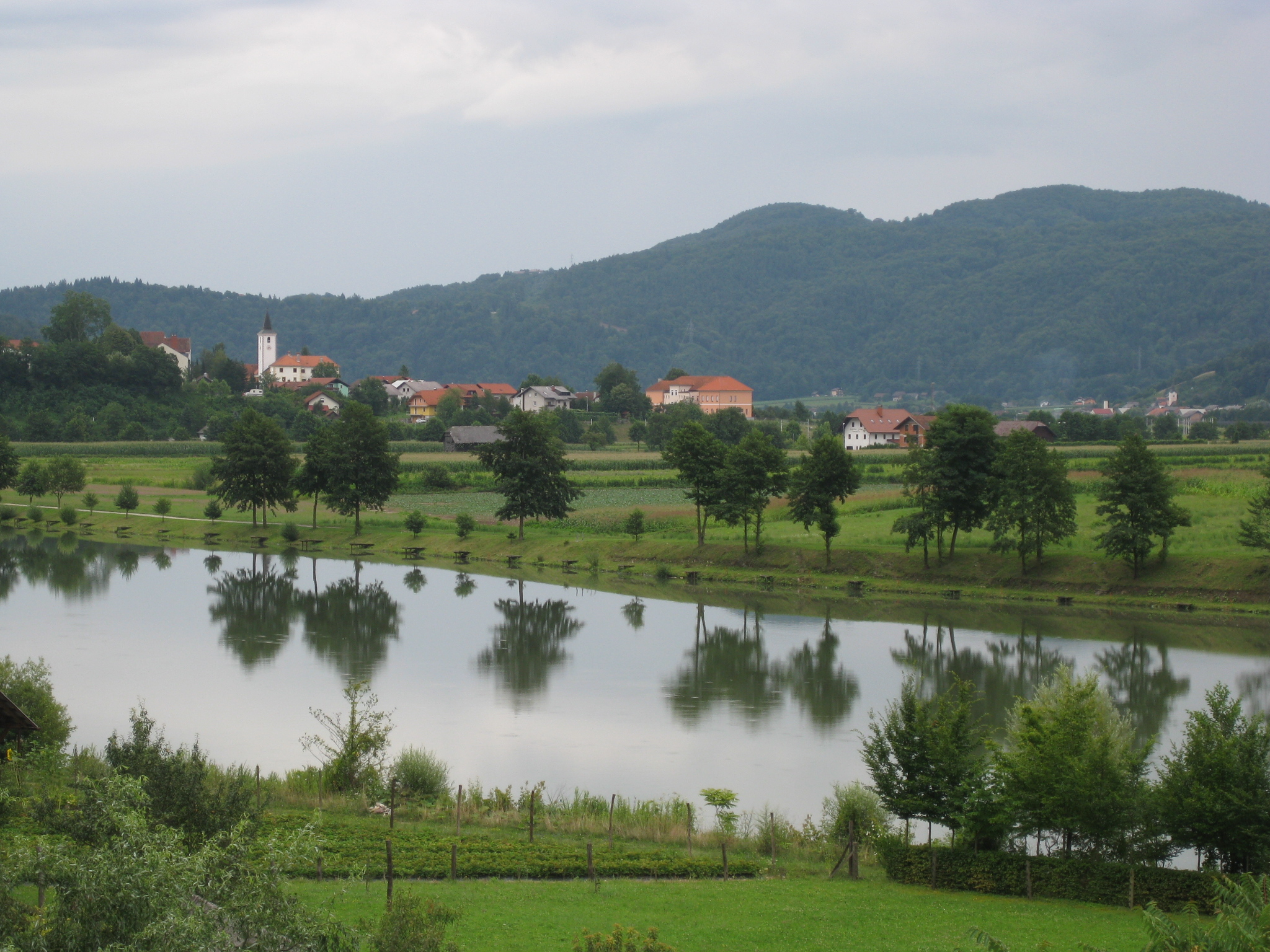
Landscape near Radeče

The Lower Sava Valley (Slovene: Posavje, also Spodnje Posavje and Posavska regija) is a region in southeastern Slovenia on the border with Croatia. It has three major urban centres: Brežice, Krško, and Sevnica. Its borders are almost identical with those of the Lower Sava Statistical Region.

It extends along the lower part of the Sava River, from the town of Krško downstream to the international border. With an area of 885 km^{2} (4.4% of Slovenia) and a 2003 population of 70,262 (79 inhabitants per km^{2} in 409 settlements), it is Slovenia's second-smallest region and one of its least densely populated ones. The neighbouring regions are the Savinja region to the north, the Central Sava Valley (Slovene: Zasavje) to the west, and Lower Carniola to the south. The constituent municipalities are Krško, Brežice, Sevnica, Kostanjevica na Krki, Radeče, and Bistrica ob Sotli.

The Lower Sava Valley is a popular tourist destination, prized for its rich cultural heritage, thermal spas, high-quality wines, and well-developed network of walking and riding trails, golf courses, and health resorts.

== Physiography and geology ==
Slovenia's Lower Sava Valley falls within the easternmost part of the Krško–Samobor Plain, the western segment of the broader Sava Plain physico-geographical unit. The Sava Plain is divided by two major tectonic constrictions—the Podsused Gate near Zagreb and the Brod Gate near Slavonski Brod—into three sub-regions: the Krško–Samobor Plain, the Upper Sava Plain, and the Lower Sava Plain. The Krško–Samobor Plain extends from Krško downstream to the Podsused Gate and is underlain exclusively by Holocene alluvial (fluvial) sediments deposited by a gently meandering river. Its flat relief results from repeated sedimentation and is bounded by fault-controlled uplands to the north and south.

Relief in this part of the valley reflects a Holocene evolution dominated by neotectonic movements, fluvial processes (sedimentation and channel migration), local slope processes, and minor aeolian activity. The plain's surface roughness coefficients, as mapped via QGIS "Roughness" analysis, fall below 5 m/m, confirming a very low-relief floodplain environment.

== Palaeogeography ==
During the middle Miocene (about 11.6–4.5 Ma), this segment of the Sava Valley lay beneath Lake Paludina, a remnant of the Pannonian Sea, before shifting to a fluvio-deltaic environment in the late Miocene to Pliocene. By the Pleistocene (about 2.6–0.1 Ma), the modern Sava River system had fully incised its course, draining headwaters from the Julian Alps and Karawanks and carrying sediments derived from central Bosnian ultramafic sources. These palaeogeographic phases are recorded in alternations of Pleistocene alluvial, Pleistocene eolian, and Holocene fluvial deposits across the plain.
