= Vukosavlje =

Vukosavlje Вукосавље
- Municipality
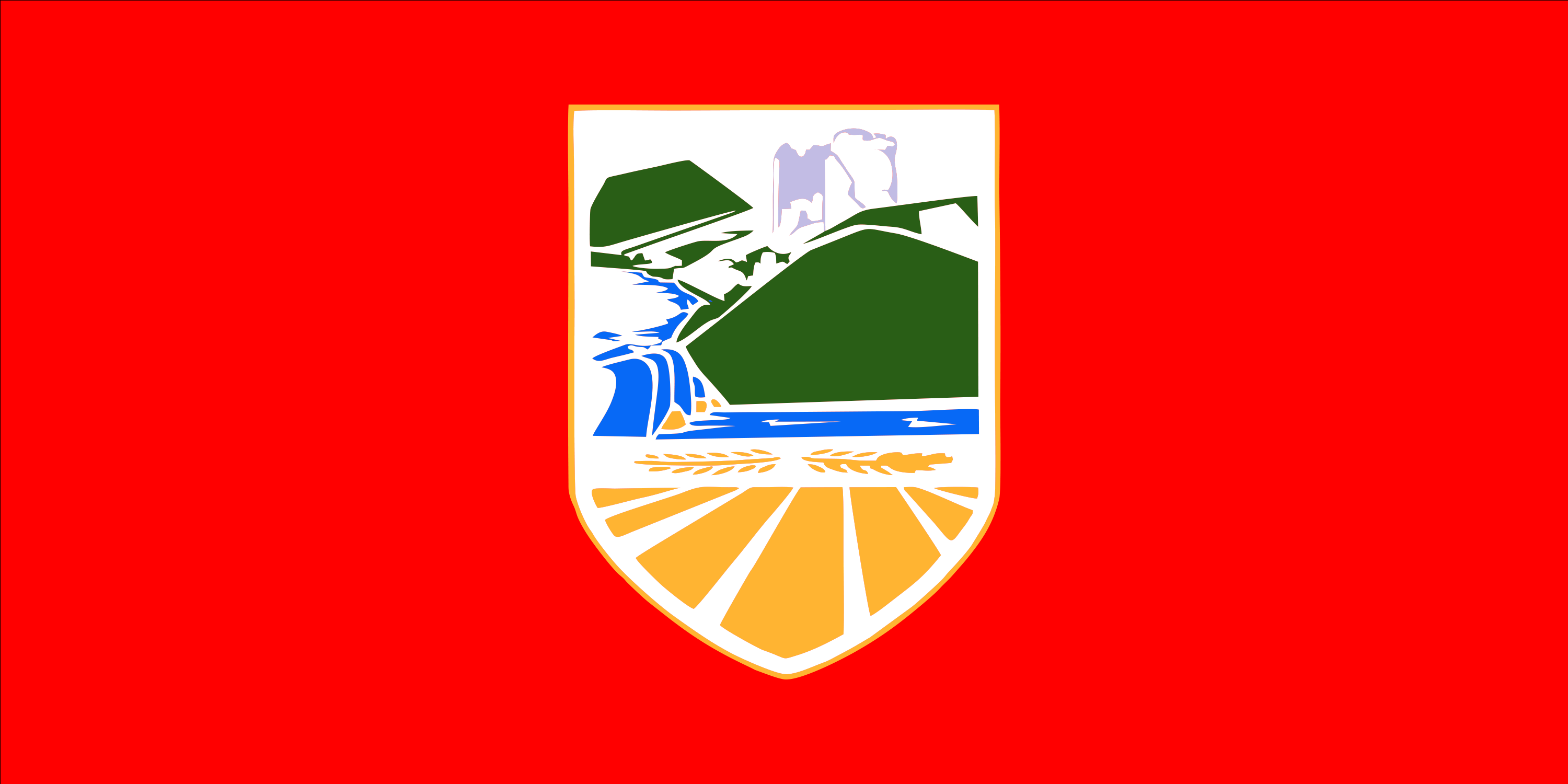
- Flag Coat of arms

- Location of Vukosavlje within Republika Srpska

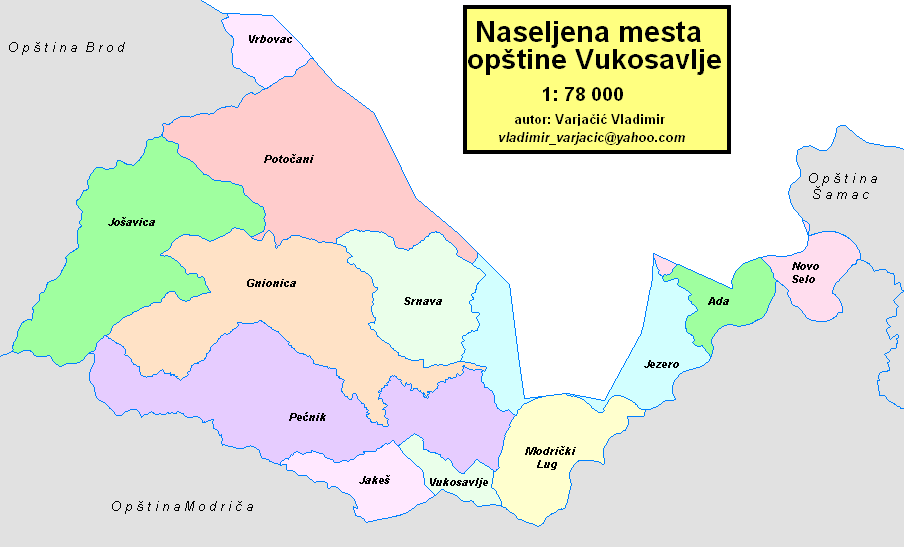
- Coordinates: 44.977914°N 18.288331°E
- Country: Bosnia and Herzegovina
- Entity: Republika Srpska
- Geographical region: Posavina

Government
  - Municipal mayor: Zekerijah Bahić (SDP BiH)
  - Municipality: 94.9 km^{2} (36.6 sq mi)

Population (2013 census)
  - Municipality: 4,667
  - Municipality density: 49.2/km^{2} (127/sq mi)
- Time zone: UTC+1 (CET)
  - Summer (DST): UTC+2 (CEST)
- Area code: 52

Vukosavlje (Serbian Cyrillic: Вукосавље) is a municipality in Republika Srpska, Bosnia and Herzegovina. It is situated in the southern part of the Posavina region. As of 2013, it has a population of 4,667 inhabitants.

The small municipality was created from part of the pre-war municipality of Odžak (the other part of the pre-war municipality is now in the Federation of Bosnia and Herzegovina entity) (settlements: Gnionica, Jošava, Srnava and parts of Ade and Potočana) and some villages from Modriča (Jakeš, Pećnik and Modrički Lug).

== Geography ==
It is located between municipalities of Odžak to the north, Šamac to the east, Modriča to the south, and Brod to the west.

== Demographics ==
=== Population ===
Population of settlements – Vukosavlje municipality
	Settlement	1991.	2013.
	Total	8,241	4,667
1	Jakeš	1,694	1,379
2	Modrički Lug	1,033	996
3	Vukosavlje	852	713
4	Gnionica	918	384
5	Jezero	399	310
6	Srnava	880	231
7	Potočani	428	188
8	Pećnik	1,487	170
9	Jošavica	252	147
10	Ada	272	129
11	Vrbovac	26	20
12	Novo Selo	0	0

=== Ethnic composition ===
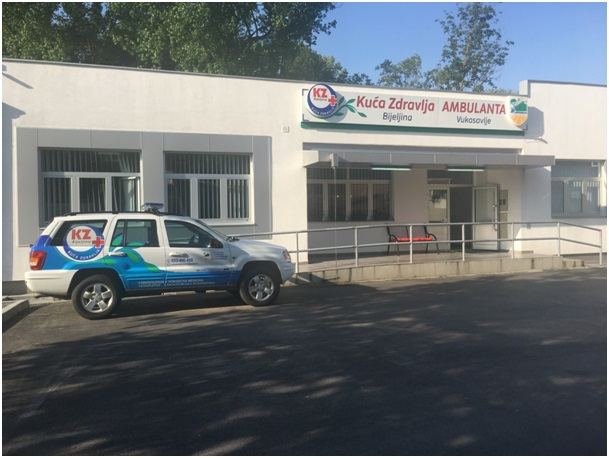
Community Health Centre

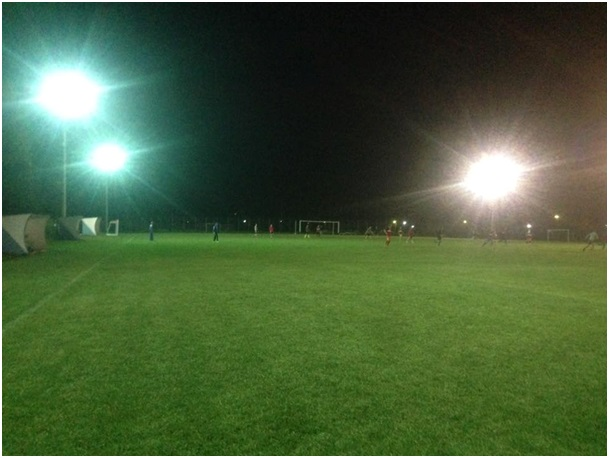
Stadion in Jakeš

Ethnic composition – Vukosavlje
	2013.
Total	768 (100,0%)

Ethnic composition – Vukosavlje municipality
	2013.	1991.
Total	4,667 (100,0%)	7,999 (100,0%)
Bosniaks	2,180 (46,71%)	2,861 (35,77%)
Serbs	1,516 (32,48%)	1,332 (16,65%)
Croats	776 (16,63%)	3,440 (43,01%)
Others	195 (4,178%)	366 (4,58%)

=== 2013 ===
In the 2013 census, the municipality of Vukosavlje had 4,667 residents, including:

- 2,180 (46.71%) Bosniaks
- 1,516 (32.48%) Serbs
- 776 (16.62%) Croats
- 195 (4.17%) others

== See also ==
- Municipalities of Republika Srpska
