= Odžak =

- Town and municipality
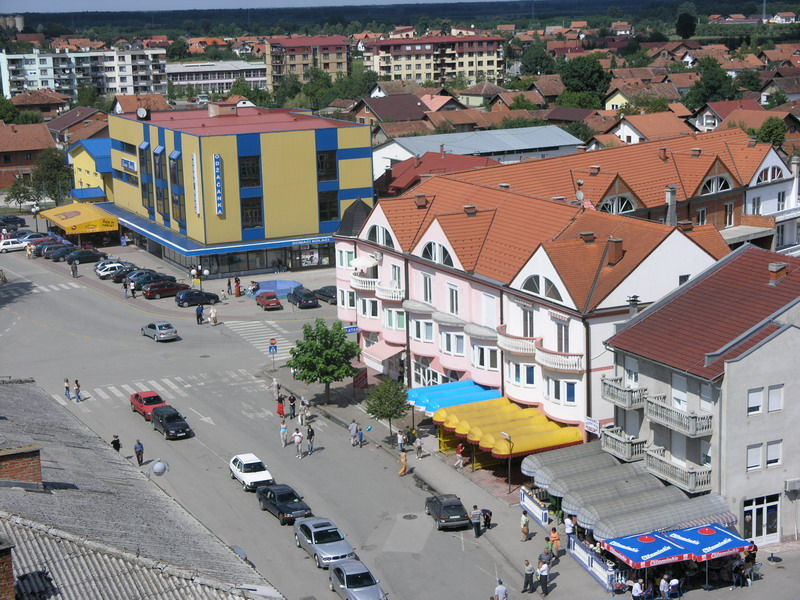

- Location of Odžak within Bosnia and Herzegovina

- Location within Bosnia and Herzegovina
- Coordinates: 45°0′38″N 18°19′35″E
- Country: Bosnia and Herzegovina
- Entity: Federation of Bosnia and Herzegovina
- Canton: Posavina
- Geographical region: Posavina

Government
  - Municipal mayor: Anes Osmanović (SDA)

Area
  - Town and municipality: 118 km^{2} (46 sq mi)

Population (2013 census)
  - Town and municipality: 18,821
  - Density: 180/km^{2} (470/sq mi)
  - Urban: 8,259
- Time zone: UTC+1 (CET)
  - Summer (DST): UTC+2 (CEST)
- Area code: +387 31
- Website: www.odzak.ba

Odžak is a town and municipality located in Posavina Canton of the Federation of Bosnia and Herzegovina, an entity of Bosnia and Herzegovina. It is situated in the northern part of Bosnia and Herzegovina, near the river Sava, 10 km (6.2 mi) from the border with Croatia. The name is derived from Turkish Ocak, during its time as a frontier town of the Ottoman Empire, and means "fireplace" in Turkish and "chimney" in modern Bosnian.

The town of Odžak is notable for being the battlegrounds of the last battle in Europe of World War II, fought between the Croatian Ustaše and Yugoslav Partisans.

== History ==
=== Roman & Medieval era ===
During the Roman era, there was a settlement and a fortress about 670 meters long in the area of the Odžak municipality, discovered by Karlo Mać. These are the remains of a large Roman city named Ad Basante (near Bosna). At that time, the Bosna River flowed beside today's mosque, and the city was right on the shore. It was necessary for the Romans because, in this area, from 6 to 9 AD, there was a war between the Illyrian tribes and Roman legions. The Illyrian tribe Breuci lived in the Posavina area. They, under Baton, rose from the Fruška Gora to the Adriatic Sea, and the Romans said these were the toughest campaigns for them since the Punic Wars. From the Tabula Peutingeriana, a map marking the routes and postal stations from Rome to Constantinople, it is visible that there was a route that passed from Slavonski Brod across Vučjak, and its remains are still in the Jošik area. The road ended in Soli (today's Tuzla).

The Huns passed this way during their migration into Europe and burned the city to the ground. After the Slavs settled in Europe and defeated the Avars, a settlement named Radunjevac was established. It was not as large as the Roman one, but gradually expanded. Nearby, Dobor Grad was founded as the gateway to Bosnia to protect the route along the river valley. It was the scene of frequent battles between the Hungarians and the local Bosnian nobility.

=== Ottoman era ===
The current city of Odžak is mentioned in historical records from 1593 as a settlement and fortress. By this point, the settlement was now under Ottoman control. That year, by the Sultan's decree, the odžakluk was introduced in Bosnia with the right of inheritance, which was awarded to commanders of the Turkish army. Miralem-beg was given this area as an odžak, a possession, and he built a small fortress using the remains of the old Roman city. After his death, his son Ibrahim inherited this property, and at that time, Odžak represented a larger settlement and border fortress with a small number of border guards.

Historical records state that the Austrian army crossed the Sava river and conquered Odžak several times until the signing of the Treaty of Belgrade in 1739, when a new border of Bosnia along the Sava River was established. For the next 100 years, Odžak spent in peace, cultural, and economic progress. The urban structure of the city was based on the principle of organizing residential groups, mahalas, connected with business zones. A wooden mosque, called Drvenija, was also built.

In 1836, the Posavina Rebellion (Jovica Ilić's) erupted, during which Odžak was burned and its population nearly halved. Some of the odžakluks of Husein captain were also burned. The Drvenija mosque in Odžak was burned, and it is not known whether it was ever rebuilt. At that time, Odžak transformed from a large kasaba into a neglected settlement.

=== Austro-Hungarian Empire ===
With the establishment of Austro-Hungarian authority in 1878 in Bosnia and Herzegovina, a new period for Odžak began. A new capitalist way of economy and a new way of building, which involves the construction of high buildings where business space on the ground floor is combined with residential space on the upper floors, were introduced. Buildings were constructed with solid material, brick, according to new regulations that introduced street and building line regulations. The Austro-Hungarian period was a time of intensive construction, satisfying both the needs of the authorities and the population. The population engaged in agriculture, livestock breeding, production, and processing of plums, which were dried and exported to Austria and Czechia. During this period, the Administrative building or Beledija, was completed in 1903, as evidenced by the inscription above the entrance doors.

=== Yugoslavia ===
After World War I, the town and the rest of Bosnia would join the newly created Kingdom of Serbs, Croats, and Slovenes (later renamed Yugoslavia). However, during World War II, the town would come under the occupation of the Ustashe. Towards the end of the war, the town would become known as the site of the last battle of the war in Europe, in which the Ustashe was defeated and destroyed by the Partisans. For the next few decades, the town would remain stable, however it would suffer greatly during the Yugoslav Wars, in which Yugoslavia collapsed. The war in Bosnia and Herzegovina in Odžak began on April 21, 1992, when Serbian forces targeted the city with 32 rockets, killing four citizens of Odžak. On July 13 of the same year, fighters of the 102nd HVO Odžak Brigade retreated towards Bosanski Brod, and enemy forces took over Odžak. According to the Dayton Peace Agreement of 1995, Odžak was placed under the administration of the Federation of Bosnia and Herzegovina. Before withdrawing in February 1996, Serbian military and paramilitary formations destroyed one mosque and seven Catholic churches.

== Geography ==
The Odžak municipality is located in northern Bosnia and Herzegovina, in a triangle enclosed to the east by the lowest part of the Bosna river, to the north by the Sava river, and to the southwest by the Vučjak mountain. The northern border of the municipality coincides with the state borders of Bosnia and Herzegovina and the Republic of Croatia. To the east of Odžak is the municipality of Bosanski Šamac, to the south the municipality of Modriča, and to the west the municipality of Vukosavlje. The area of the municipality is predominantly flat, with slight undulations on the slopes of Vučjak in the western part. The highest point of the Odžak municipality is Kadar peak, which is located at 204 meters above sea level.

== Demographics ==
=== Population ===
Population of settlements – Odžak municipality
Year	1971	1981	1991	2013
Total	25,901	27,895	28,568	18,821
Donja Dubica			3,254	1,472
Donji Svilaj			1,576	1,107
Gornja Dubica			1,596	918
Gornji Svilaj			1,810	673
Novi Grad			1,907	362
Novo Selo			2,669	1,605
Odžak	6,064	7,634	8,987	8,259
Posavska Mahala			1,199	849
Potočani			1,822	1,332
Prud			1,293	941
Vrbovac			1,695	1,015

=== Ethnic composition ===
Ethnic composition – Odžak town
	2013	1991	1981	1971
Total	8,259	9,386	7,634	6,064
Bosniaks	6,185	6,205	5,347	4,760
Croats	1,682	1,404	950	751
Others	311	359	85	48
Serbs	81	599	470	372
Yugoslavs		819	740	81
Montenegrins			15	11
Albanians			14	27
Slovenes			5	2
Hungarians			5	10
Macedonians			3	2

Ethnic composition – Odžak municipality
	2013	1991	1981	1971
Total	21,289	30,056	27,895	25,901
Croats	11,621	16,338	15,430	14,995
Bosniaks	6,220	6,220	5,371	4,777
Serbs	582	5,667	5,361	5,881
Others	340	684	376	97
Albanians	48		21	28
Roma	8			
Montenegrins	1		28	15
Slovenes	1		8	3
Yugoslavs		1,147	1,276	85
Macedonians			13	5
Hungarians			11	15

== Culture ==
Currently, two cultural associations operate in the city of Odžak, "Cultural and Artistic Society Preporod" and "Cultural and Artistic Society Napredak". These two cultural societies organize numerous cultural events in the city of Odžak every year.

The cultural event "Musa's Days" is held in honor of the birth of the prominent Bosnian-Herzegovinian poet Musa Ćazim Ćatić. The Cultural and Artistic Society Preporod and the Odžak radio station organize this event every year, lasting from March 12 to April 6, from the birth and death dates of Musa Ćazim Ćatić. As part of this event, a literary competition for high school and elementary school students from Odžak is held, along with a drama performance about the life and work of Musa Ćazim Ćatić, and numerous sports and music events.

Besides Musa's Days, Odžak also annually hosts a cultural event called Posavsko Kolo. This is one of the largest events in the Posavina Canton, celebrated around the feast of the Assumption of Mary, and involves a large number of cultural and artistic societies from all parts of Bosnia and Herzegovina and Croatia. The event features a folklore review, numerous music performances, sports competitions, a livestock fair, art exhibitions, a kulen sausage festival, a motorcycle rally, etc.

As part of the Posavsko Kolo event, a traditional gathering of Odžak citizens and the Bosnian-Herzegovinian diaspora called "At the Gateway of Bosnia" is also held. This event takes place at the beginning of August on the main square in Odžak, in front of the old Municipality building, and is unique because many Odžak residents living abroad return to the city during its celebration.

A significant social event in Odžak is also the celebration of the Hijri year, as the central event marking the New Muslim Year in the Tuzla Mufti district and Bosnia and Herzegovina is organized in Odžak every year.

Apart from public festivities in the town square and religious ceremonies in the mosque, the new year celebration is also filled with theater performances by cultural centers from Tuzla, Zenica, Tešanj, and other Bosnian-Herzegovinian cities.

The list of national monuments of Bosnia and Herzegovina for the Odžak municipality includes the following monument:

The Municipal Building (Beledija or Small City Hall) in Odžak (historic building).

== Economy ==
Before the Breakup of Yugoslavia, over 5,000 people were employed primarily in industry and agriculture. The largest industrial facilities were Strolit with over 700 employees, Energoinvest, Vuntex, and Borovo.

== Sports ==
Several sports clubs operate in Odžak, with the Volleyball Club Napredak standing out the most, achieving commendable results in all categories and age groups in a relatively short time.

Besides the volleyball club, the Odžak Basketball Club, founded in 1980, also shows outstanding results. As in the rest of Bosnia and Herzegovina, football is popular in Odžak, and the Football Club "Odžak 102" competes in the Second Football League of FBiH, North group.

Several memorial tournaments are held every year, including the Mehmed Ribić - Meho Memorial Tournament, the Bahrija Šogorović - Šiš Memorial Tournament, and the Amir Jupić - Pidžama Memorial Tournament. FK Jedinstvo Odžak was founded in 1945.

== Attractions ==
In the center of Odžak, one of the protected cultural monuments of Bosnia and Herzegovina is located, namely the Beledija, or the small city hall (municipal building) built in 1903 by the Austro-Hungarian monarchy.

== Notable people ==
- Musa Ćazim Ćatić, Bosniak poet
- Meho Puzić, famous interpreter of sevdalinkas
