= Posavina =

Geographical region in Slovenia, Croatia, Bosnia and Herzegovina, and Serbia

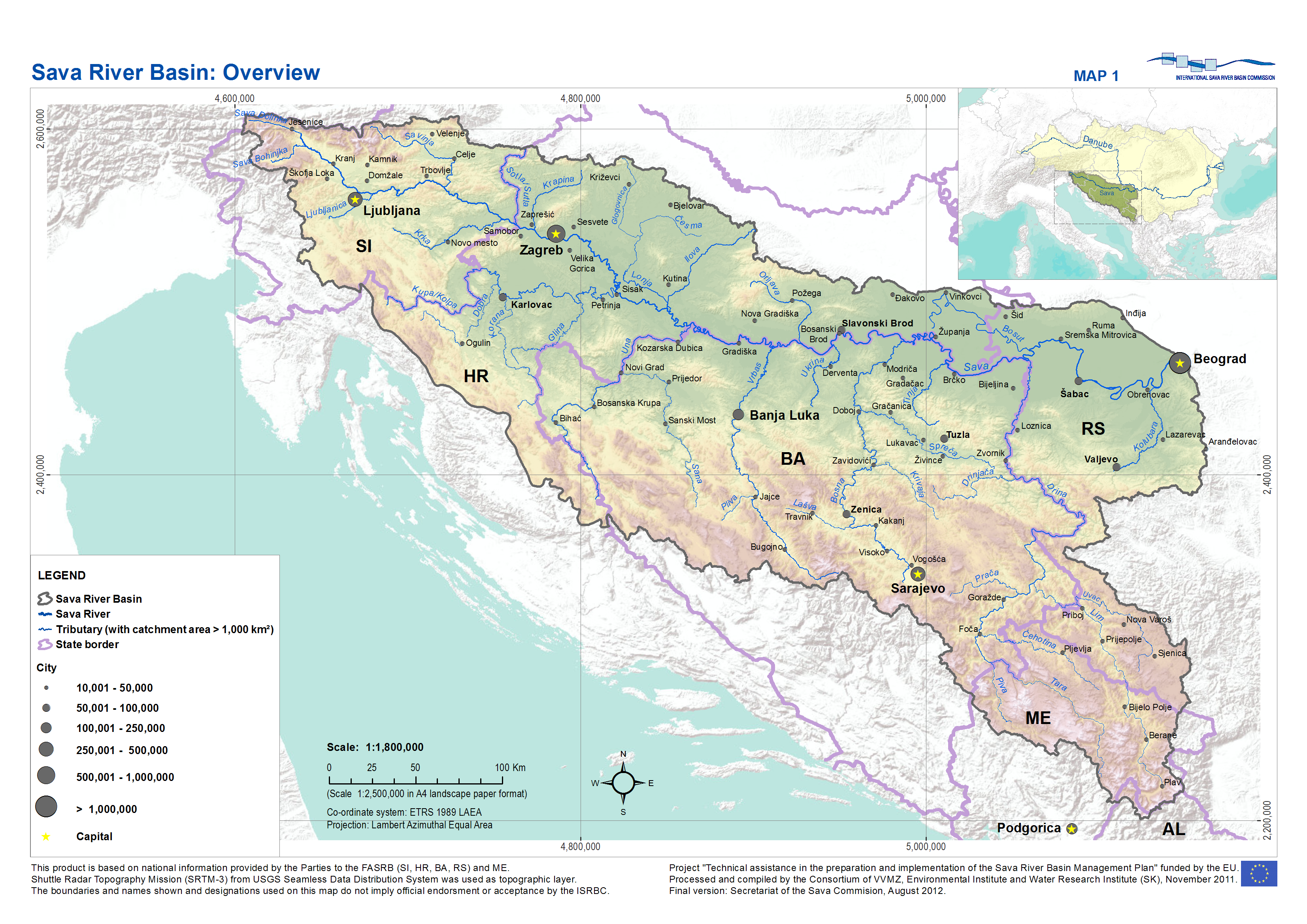
Map of the Sava river basin, with Posavina encompassing only the inner regions, near and along the river Sava itself (green).

Posavina (Serbian Cyrillic: Посавина) is a geographical region that stretches along the Sava river, encompassing only the inner areas of the Sava river basin, that are adjacent or near to the Sava river itself, namely catch region spanning from the Julian Alps in the northwest to the confluence with the Danube in the southeast. It passes through several countries of former Yugoslavia, namely Slovenia, Croatia, Bosnia and Herzegovina and Serbia. In Slovene, the term Posavina is not used to describe the parts of Slovenia that lie by the Sava river. Instead, the terms Posavje, Zasavje and Zgornjesavska dolina are used (however, the parts of Slovenia between Litija and Bled, as well as Bohinj, are generally not defined by their proximity to the Sava river in Slovenian geographical nomenclature).

== History ==
During the Roman era, the region belonged to the province of Pannonia, marking its most southern zone. During the reign of emperor Augustus, it was the epicenter of the Pannonian Uprising. During the 5th century, the region was invaded by several migrating peoples, including Huns and Goths. In post-Roman era, during the 6th century, the region was contested between Ostrogoths, Gepids, Langobards, Avars, and the Byzantine Empire.

By the end the 6th and during the 7th century, the entire region was settled by South Slavs. In 819-823, western parts of the region were center of the Ljudevit's Rebellion against the Frankish Empire. During the 11th and 12th century, almost all parts of Posavina were gradually conquered by the Kingdom of Hungary.

In the first half of the 18th century, Sava-Danube (Posavina-Podunavlje) section of the Habsburg Military Frontier existed in the area. Posavina segment of the Frontier comprised parts of the Kingdom of Croatia-Slavonia – the southern parts of Slavonia and Syrmia, stretching from Nova Gradiška to the confluence of the Drina river into the Sava.

Between 1929 and 1939, one of the provinces of the Kingdom of Yugoslavia was known as the Croatian region Sava Banovina. The capital city of the province was Zagreb in Croatia. In 1939, Sava Banovina was merged with Littoral Banovina to form new Banovina of Croatia.

Today, one of the counties in Croatia is named Brod-Posavina County and one of the cantons in Bosnia and Herzegovina is named Posavina Canton.

The Bosnian Posavina region was gravely hit by the Bosnian War (1992–95) to the point that parts of it had become uninhabited, as almost all the houses were plundered, burnt or destroyed. Only a small number of people have returned to their homes. The majority of refugees live in and around the city of Slavonski Brod, Croatia right across Sava, while a minority emigrated to the European Union countries, the United States, and Australia.

== Geography ==
The geography of the Posavina region is defined by geological features of the central (inner) zones of the Sava River Basin, near or adjacent to the Sava river itself. The region extends along the Sava river, which flows from west to east, connecting valleys and plains in transitional regions between the Dinaric Mountains and the Pannonian Plain. The geographical borders of the Posavina region are defined, to the south, by northern zones of the Dinaric Alps, while Posavina′s northern borders are defined by the Pannonian island mountains. In terms of political geography, the Posavina region is divided into Croatian Posavina, Bosnian Posavina, and Serbian Posavina.

Cities and towns in Slovenia:

- Brežice
- Jesenice
- Kranj
- Krško
- Litija
- Ljubljana
- Sevnica

Cities and towns in Croatia:

- Davor
- Dugo Selo
- Ivanić-Grad
- Nova Gradiška
- Velika Gorica
- Samobor
- Sisak
- Slavonski Brod
- Zagreb
- Zaprešić
- Županja

Cities and towns in Bosnia and Herzegovina:

- Brčko
- Brod
- Derventa
- Gradiška
- Modriča
- Odžak
- Orašje
- Šamac

Cities and towns in Serbia:

- Belgrade
- Šabac
- Sremska Mitrovica
- Obrenovac

== See also ==
- Brod-Posavina County
- Posavina Canton
- International Sava River Basin Commission

== Sources ==
- Daim, Falko (2019). "The Longobards in Pannonia". Prima e dopo Alboino: sulle tracce dei Longobardi. Napoli: Guida. pp. 221–241.
- Gračanin, Hrvoje (2006). "The Huns and South Pannonia". Byzantinoslavica. 64: 29–76.
- Vasin, Dejana (2019). "Natural Conditions as a Factor of Urbanization of the Lower Posavina in the Middle Ages". Istraživanja: Journal of Historical Researches. 30 (30): 45–68. doi:10.19090/i.2019.30.45-68.
