= Orašje =

Orašje Орашје
- City
- Grad Orašje; Град Орашје; City of Orašje
- Coat of arms

- Location of Orašje within Bosnia and Herzegovina
- Coordinates: 45°2′10″N 18°41′36″E
- Country: Bosnia and Herzegovina
- Entity: Federation of Bosnia and Herzegovina
- Canton: Posavina
- Geographical region: Posavina

Government
  - Mayor: Marijan Oršolić (HDZ BiH)

Area
  - City: 122 km^{2} (47 sq mi)
- Elevation: 80 m (260 ft)

Population (2013 census)
  - City: 19,861
  - Density: 163/km^{2} (420/sq mi)
  - Urban: 3,614
- Time zone: UTC+1 (CET)
  - Summer (DST): UTC+2 (CEST)
- Postal code: 76270
- Area code: (+387) 31
- Website: www.orasje.ba

Orašje (Serbian Cyrillic: Орашје) is a city and the capital of Posavina Canton of the Federation of Bosnia and Herzegovina, an entity of Bosnia and Herzegovina. It is situated in the northern part of Bosnia and Herzegovina, on the banks of river Sava near the border with Croatia. As of 2013, it has a population of 19,861 inhabitants.

== Demographics ==
=== Population ===
Population of settlements – Orašje municipality
	Settlement	1971.	1981.	1991.	2013.
	Total	25,740	27,806	28,211	21,284
1	Bok			1,705	1,392
2	Donja Mahala			4,273	3,702
3	Kopanice			1,317	768
4	Kostrč			1,655	1,379
5	Matići			2,034	1,602
6	Orašje	2,787	3,420	3,907	3,796
7	Oštra Luka				1,595
8	Tolisa			3,326	2,731
9	Ugljara			1,400	1,205
10	Vidovice			2,273	1,678

=== Ethnic composition ===
Ethnic composition – Orašje town
	2013.	1991.	1981.	1971.
Total	3,796 (100,0%)	3,907 (100,0%)	3,420 (100,0%)	2,787 (100,0%)
Bosniaks	2,075 (57,41%)	1,843 (47,17%)	1,503 (43,95%)	1,840 (66,02%)
Croats	1,350 (37,35%)	591 (15,13%)	426 (12,46%)	333 (11,95%)
Unaffiliated	84 (2,324%)			
Serbs	42 (1,162%)	875 (22,40%)	662 (19,36%)	442 (15,86%)
Albanians	27 (0,747%)		29 (0,848%)	34 (1,220%)
Others	21 (0,581%)	128 (3,276%)	16 (0,468%)	24 (0,861%)
Unknown	7 (0,194%)			
Yugoslavs	2 (0,055%)	470 (12,03%)	761 (22,25%)	92 (3,301%)
Montenegrins	2 (0,055%)		10 (0,292%)	14 (0,502%)
Roma	2 (0,055%)			5 (0,179%)
Macedonians	1 (0,028%)		10 (0,292%)	
Ukrainians	1 (0,028%)			
Slovenes			2 (0,058%)	1 (0,036%)
Hungarians			1 (0,029%)	2 (0,072%)

Ethnic composition – Orašje municipality
	2013.	1991.	1981.	1971.
Total	21,284 (100,0%)	28,367 (100,0%)	27,806 (100,0%)	25,740 (100,0%)
Croats	17,345 (87,33%)	21,308 (75,12%)	20,705 (74,46%)	19,354 (75,19%)
Bosniaks	2,127 (10,71%)	1,893 (6,673%)	1,548 (5,567%)	1,867 (7,253%)
Serbs	159 (0,800%)	4,235 (14,93%)	4 151 (14,93%)	4,266 (16,57%)
Unaffiliated	100 (0,503%)			
Others	59 (0,297%)	305 (1,075%)	174 (0,626%)	62 (0,241%)
Albanians	28 (0,141%)		42 (0,151%)	34 (0,132%)
Unknown	26 (0,131%)			
Ukrainians	5 (0,025%)			
Yugoslavs	4 (0,020%)	626 (2,207%)	1,153 (4,147%)	131 (0,509%)
Macedonians	3 (0,015%)		12 (0,043%)	2 (0,008%)
Montenegrins	2 (0,010%)		18 (0,065%)	15 (0,058%)
Roma	2 (0,010%)			5 (0,019%)
Turks	1 (0,005%)			
Slovenes			2 (0,007%)	2 (0,008%)
Hungarians			1 (0,004%)	2 (0,008%)

== Sports ==
The local football club is HNK Orašje.

== Notable people ==
- Zdenko Baotić, footballer
- Bakir Beširević, former footballer
- Ivo Gregurević, actor
- Edin Husić, footballer
- Miro Klaić, former football player
- Mato Neretljak, former footballer
- Marko Topić, former footballer
- Aleksandar Živković, footballer
