= Cantons of the Federation of Bosnia and Herzegovina =

Subdivisions of the Federation of Bosnia and Herzegovina

Cantons of the Federation of Bosnia and Herzegovina Kantoni Federacije Bosne i Hercegovine (Bosnian) Županije Federacije Bosne i Hercegovine (Croatian) Кантони Федерације Босне и Херцеговине (Serbian)
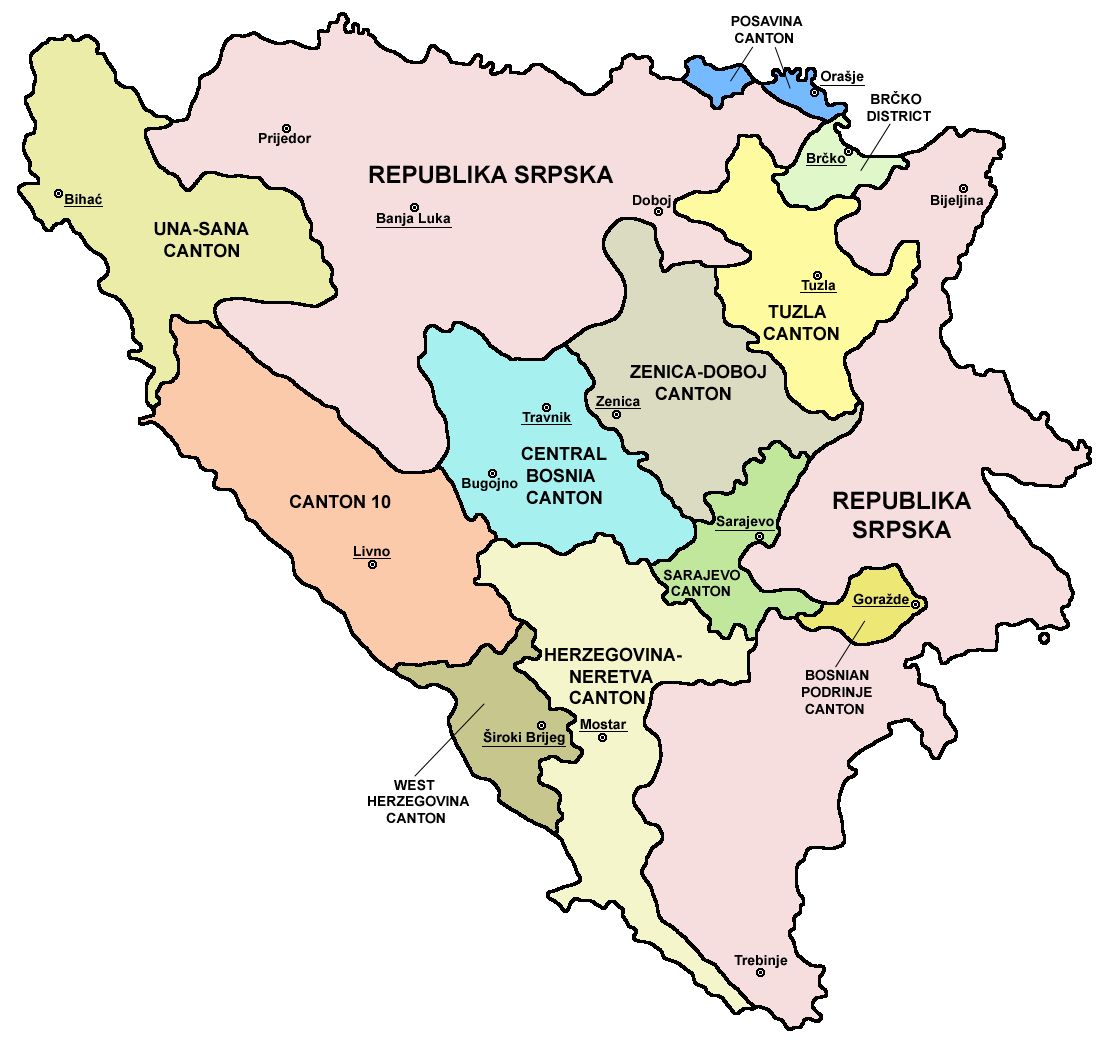
- Category: Federal unit
- Location: Federation of Bosnia and Herzegovina
- Created: 12 June 1996
- Number: 10
- Populations: 23,734 (Bosnian-Podrinje Canton Goražde) – 445,028 (Tuzla)
- Areas: 325 km^{2} (125.5 sq mi) (Posavina) – 4,934 km^{2} (1,905.1 sq mi) (Canton 10)
- Government: Cantonal government
- Subdivisions: Municipalities

The ten cantons of the Federation of Bosnia and Herzegovina, one of the two entities of Bosnia and Herzegovina, are its federated states with a high level of autonomy. The cantons were established by the Law on Federal Units (Cantons) on 12 June 1996 as a result of the Washington Agreement of 1994 between the representatives of the Bosniaks and Bosnian Croats.

Five of the cantons have a Bosniak majority: Una-Sana Canton, Tuzla Canton, Zenica-Doboj Canton, Bosnian-Podrinje Canton Goražde and Sarajevo Canton; three have a Croat majority: Posavina Canton, West Herzegovina Canton and Canton 10, and two cantons are regarded as ethnically mixed: Central Bosnia Canton and Herzegovina-Neretva Canton.

The areas of the cantons vary from 325 km^{2} (125.5 sq. mi.) (Posavina) to 4,934 km^{2} (1905.1 sq. mi.) (Canton 10); the populations (as of 2013) range from 23,734 (Bosnian-Podrinje Goražde) to 445,028 (Tuzla Canton).

== Creation ==
The cantons are the result of the 1993 Vance–Owen Peace Plan for the war in Bosnia and Herzegovina, applied only to one part of Bosnia and Herzegovina. The plan originally foresaw the cantonization of the whole of Bosnia and Herzegovina. The cantons were to be named after rivers and cities in the Federation of Bosnia and Herzegovina, based on the tradition from the Kingdom of Yugoslavia's naming of banates in 1929.

The Law created the ten cantons of the Federation of Bosnia and Herzegovina on Federal Units (Cantons), enacted by the Constituent Assembly of the Federation of Bosnia and Herzegovina on 12 June 1996. Of these, five have Bosniak and three Croat majorities, while two cantons are mixed.

== Governance ==
The cantons consist of municipalities. A canton has its own government headed by a prime minister. The prime minister has his own cabinet, and is assisted in his duties by various cantonal ministries, agencies, and cantonal services. Five of the cantons (Una-Sana, Tuzla, Zenica-Doboj, Bosnian-Podrinje, and Sarajevo) have a Bosniak majority, three (Posavina, West Herzegovina and Canton 10) have a Bosnian Croat majority, while two of them (Central Bosnia and Herzegovina-Neretva) are "ethnically mixed", meaning neither ethnic group has a majority and there are special legislative procedures for the protection of their political interests.

Per the constitution of the Federation of Bosnia and Herzegovina, the cantons operate under a parliamentary system where the executive branch of government is accountable to the universally elected canton's parliament. Additionally, they also include having their own cantonal constitution.

As the Federation of Bosnia and Herzegovina was created on the principle of decentralisation, the cantons have strong autonomy which is guaranteed by a long list of exclusive jurisdictions in the Constitution of the Federation of Bosnia and Herzegovina that wasn't listed for the federal government, including police, education, cultural policy, housing policy, public services, local economic policy, energy policy, media policy, welfare, tourism and the right of the cantons to introduce taxation and borrow money. Other jurisdictions are shared with the Federation of Bosnia and Herzegovina, including enforcement of human rights, health and environmental policy, infrastructure, social welfare, tourism and natural resources. Although in some areas the constitution foresaw a mixed jurisdiction between the Federation of Bosnia and Herzegovina and the cantons, such as tourism and energy policy, the cantons are the dominant actors. The principle of decentralisation is especially emphasised in the two mixed cantons, where the decisions regarding core issues, such as education, are left in the jurisdiction of the municipalities.

== List of cantons ==
No.	Abbr	Coat of arms	Flag	Name in English	Center	Population (2013)	Bosniaks	%	Croats	%	Serbs	%	Area (km^{2})	Density	Municipalities
1	USK; USŽ			Una-Sana Canton	Bihać	273,261	246,012	90.03%	5,073	1.86%	8,452	3.09%	4,125.0	69.8	8
2	PK; ŽP			Posavina Canton	Orašje	43,453	8,252	18.99%	33,600	77.32%	831	1.91%	324.6	124.8	3
3	TK; TŽ			Tuzla Canton	Tuzla	445,028	392,356	88.16%	23,592	5.30%	7,058	1.59%	2,649.0	187.9	13
4	ZDK; ZDŽ			Zenica-Doboj Canton	Zenica	364,433	299,452	82.17%	43,819	12.02%	5,543	1.52%	3,334.3	119.9	12
5	BPK; BPŽ			Bosnian-Podrinje Canton Goražde	Goražde	23,734	22,313	94.01%	24	0.10%	885	3.73%	504.6	65.8	3
6	SBK; ŽSB			Central Bosnia Canton	Travnik	254,686	146,652	57.58%	97,629	38.33%	3,043	1.19%	3,189	80.2	12
7	HNK; HNŽ			Herzegovina-Neretva Canton	Mostar	222,007	92,005	41.44%	118,297	53.29%	6,432	2.90%	4,401	51.5	9
8	ZHK; ŽZH			West Herzegovina Canton	Široki Brijeg	94,898	718	0.76%	93,725	98.77%	101	0.11%	1,362.2	60.1	4
9	KS; SŽ			Sarajevo Canton	Sarajevo	413,593	346,575	83.80%	17,520	4.24%	13,300	3.22%	1,276.9	329.9	9
10	K10; HBŽ			Canton 10	Livno	84,127	8,037	9.55%	64,604	76.79%	10,905	12.96%	4,934.9	16.5	6
	FBiH			Federation of Bosnia and Herzegovina	Sarajevo	2,219,220	1,562,372	70.40%	497,883	22.44%	56,550	2.55%	26,110.0	89.1	79

== See also ==
- Assemblies of the cantons of the Federation of Bosnia and Herzegovina
- ISO 3166-2:BA

== Sources ==
=== Books ===
- Ethnicity/National Affiliation, Religion and Mother Tongue (PDF). Sarajevo: Agency for Statistics of Bosnia and Herzegovina. 2019.
- Gavrić, Saša; Banović, Damir, eds. (2012). Parlamentarizam u Bosni i Hercegovini. Sarajevo: Sarajevski otvoreni centar/Fondacija Friedrich Ebert. ISBN 9789958536014.
- Keil, Soeren (2016). Multinational Federalism in Bosnia and Herzegovina. London: Routledge. ISBN 9781317093435.

=== Journals ===
- Jurilj, Lana (2017). "Država kao subjekt međunarodnog prava s posebnim osvrtom na Bosnu i Hercegovinu". Mostariensia. 21 (1): 83–95. doi:10.47960/2831-0322.

=== Websites ===
- Newbury, Christopher; Kittlemann, Peter (2–6 October 2001). "Report on local and regional democracy in Bosnia and Herzegovina - CG (8) 23 Part II". rm.coe.int. Council of Europe. Archived from the original on 2026-04-24. "Within the cantons, public authority is exercised according to parliamentary principles: the cantonal legislature is elected by universal suffrage, and the executive is in turn appointed by and answerable to the legislature (Constitution of the Federation, section V, Articles 5-10)."
- Branislav Bijelić. "Bosnia & Herzegovina". ARL International.
