= Posavina Canton =

Canton of the Federation of Bosnia and Herzegovina

Posavina Canton Posavski kanton Županija Posavska Посавски кантон
- Flag Coat of arms

- Status: Canton of the Federation of Bosnia and Herzegovina
- Capital: Orašje
- Largest city: Odžak
- Official languages: Croatian, Bosnian and Serbian
- Ethnic groups (2013): 77.32% Croats; 19% Bosniaks; 1.91% Serbs; 1.77% others
- Demonym: Posavinian
- Government: Parliamentary system
  - Prime Minister: Đuro Topić (HDZ BiH)
  - President of Assembly: Blaž Župarić (HDZ BiH)
- Legislature: Assembly of the Posavina Canton

Canton of the Federation of Bosnia and Herzegovina
  - Establishment: 12 June 1996

Area
  - Total: 330.85 km^{2} (127.74 sq mi)

Population
  - 2013 census: 43,453
  - Density: 131.33/km^{2} (340.1/sq mi)
- HDI (2023): 0.801 very high
- Currency: BAM
- Time zone: UTC+1 (CET)
  - Summer (DST): UTC+2 (CEST)
- Date format: dd-mm-yyyy

The Posavina Canton (Croatian: Županija Posavska; Serbian and Bosnian: Posavski kanton; Cyrillic: Посавски кантон) is a federated state and one of ten cantons of the Federation of Bosnia and Herzegovina in Bosnia and Herzegovina. It is the smallest canton with an area of only 330.85 km^{2} (128 sq mi). The canton is an exclave of Federation of Bosnia and Herzegovina, being bordered by Republika Srpska and Brčko District to the south and the river Sava and Croatia to the north. Its capital is Orašje and the largest town is Odžak.

== History ==
The Posavina area was inhabited since prehistoric times, as evidenced by various archaeological finds of coins and other artifacts. After the 1718 Treaty of Passarowitz between the Ottoman Empire and Habsburg monarchy, mostly Catholic families from mountain villages were displaced across the plains, as the Turks themselves settled in the hills and valleys. The Croats from Županja, Babina Greda and Štitar moved to the villages of Kopanice, Vidovice, Tolisa and Domaljevac.

The current municipalities of Derventa and Bosanski Brod were settled by people from Herzegovina between the years 1735 and 1782, and once again in a minor wave in 1820. Since 1697, approximately 20,000 Catholics emigrated from the area. Most of the people emigrated to the municipalities of Modriča, Gradačac, Orašje, Bosanski Šamac and Brčko from Mostar, Posušje, Uskoplje, Bugojno, Livno and Duvno.

Before the Bosnian War, the present-day municipalities of Donji Žabar and Vukosavlje belonged to Odžak and Orašje, while the present-day municipality of Domaljevac-Šamac belonged to Bosanski Šamac. The history of today's canton began on 18 March 1994 with the signing of the Washington Agreement. Posavina Canton was officially established on 12 June 1996 as one of the ten cantons of the Federation of Bosnia and Herzegovina, one of the 3 Croat-majority cantons.

== Geography ==
The canton lies near the border with Croatia and near the river Sava which forms a natural border between Bosnia and Herzegovina and Croatia. The canton consist of two unconnected exclaves: the western one consisting of Odžak municipality and the eastern one consisting of Orašje and Domaljevac-Šamac municipalities.

Posavina is a region which includes other parts of Bosnia and Herzegovina and parts of Croatia. Because of that, this canton is sometimes called Bosanska Posavina (Bosnian Posavina) and is the only part of northern Bosnia near the border with Croatia that lies in the Federation. The rest of northern Bosnia near the river Sava and near the border is the Brčko District and the Republika Srpska. The Brčko district divides Republika Srpska into two parts.

The Posavina canton's position near the Sava river makes it a good place for agriculture because it is a flat lowland and there are no mountains in the area. It is like this in the entire northern border with Croatia, with a great deal of farming and agriculture. The river Sava is a river that flows through Slovenia, Croatia, Bosnia and Herzegovina and Serbia. In Bosnia and Herzegovina it flows through the northern border and makes a natural border between Bosnia and Herzegovina and Croatia.

Posavina means literally along Sava in the Bosnian language. The river Sava is the largest navigable river in Bosnia and Herzegovina. Much of the food in both Bosnia and Herzegovina and Croatia comes from this region, not only Bosnian Posavina but the rest of the fertile fields along the river Sava.

=== Municipalities ===
The canton consists of the municipalities of Domaljevac-Šamac, Odžak, and Orašje.

== Demographics ==
Ethnic groups of Posavina (2013 census)
1. Croats (77.3%)
2. Bosniaks (19.0%)
3. Serbs (1.91%)
4. Other groups (1.78%)

=== 1991 Census ===
Municipality	Nationality								Total
Municipality	Croats	%	Serbs	%	Bosniaks	%	Other	%	Total
Odžak	16,338	54.36	5,667	18.85	6,220	20.69	1,831	6.09	30,056
Orašje	21,308	75.12	4,235	14.93	1,893	6.67	931	3.28	28,367
Domaljevac-Šamac	4,598	98.02	26	0.55	7	0.15	60	1.28	4,691
Canton	42,224	66.90	9,928	15.73	8,113	12.85	2,822	4.47	63,114

=== 2013 Census ===
Municipality	Nationality						Total
Municipality	Bosniaks	%	Croats	%	Serbs	%	Total
Odžak	6,220	33.04	11,621	61.74	582	3.09	18,821
Orašje	2,015	10.14	17,345	87.33	157	0.79	19,861
Domaljevac-Šamac	17	0.35	4,634	97.12	92	1.92	4,771
Canton	8,252	18.99	33,600	77.32	831	1.91	43,453

== Politics and government ==
According to the law, Posavina Canton is one of the ten cantons of the Federation of Bosnia and Herzegovina, which is one of the two entities of Bosnia and Herzegovina.

Posavina has its own legislative, executive and judicial powers. Like each of the cantons of FBiH, Canton Posavina has its own constitution, assembly, government, symbols and has a number of exclusive competences (police, education, use of natural resources, spatial and housing policy, culture), while some competences are divided between federal and cantonal authorities (health, social protection, transport). The seat of the executive power, i.e. the capital of the canton, is Orašje (Posavina Cantonal Government), while in Domaljevac is the seat of the legislative power (Posavina Cantonal Assembly) and in Odžak is the seat of the judiciary.

At the local level, the citizens of Posavina Canton vote for the government in three municipalities every four years in free elections.

=== Legislative branch ===
Every four years, the citizens of Canton Posavina vote in general elections for a total of 21 deputies in the Assembly of Canton Posavina.

The current composition of the cantonal assembly is:

Groups	Members per group
HDZ BIH	12 / 21
SDA	3 / 21
HDZ 1990	2 / 21
SDP BIH	1 / 21
HRS	1 / 21
Independent	1 / 21
PDA	1 / 21

=== Government ===
Based on the general elections, the current PK government is formed by a coalition between the Croatian Democratic Union of Bosnia and Herzegovina (HDZ BiH) and the Social Democratic Party of Bosnia and Herzegovina (SDP BiH).

The current PK government consists of the following ministries:

Ministry	Minister	Took office	Party
Prime Minister	Đuro Topić	7 February 2023	HDZ BIH
Ministry of Internal Affairs	Đuro Delić	22 February 2024	HDZ BIH
Ministry of Justice and Administration	Mirsad Ahmetović	7 February 2023	SDP BIH
Ministry of Finance	Mijo Stanić	7 February 2023	HDZ BIH
Ministry of Transport, Communications and Environmental Protection	Pero Radić	7 February 2023	HDZ BIH
Ministry of Education, Science, Culture and Sports	Ana Andrić	7 February 2023	HDZ BIH
Ministry of Health and Social Policy	Damir Živković	7 February 2023	HDZ BIH
Ministry of Agriculture, Water Management and Forestry	Mato Brkić	7 February 2023	HDZ BIH
Ministry of Economy, Labor and Spatial Planning	Dragutin Živković	7 February 2023	HDZ BIH
Ministry of Veterans	Ilija Mišković	7 February 2023	HDZ BIH

== Economy ==
In the pre-war period, especially in the last ten years, the canton was one of the richest areas in Bosnia and Herzegovina. It is important in agriculture (Posavina is the largest granary in Bosnia and Herzegovina), economically (oil refinery in Bosanski Brod and Modriča, furniture, textiles, shoe factories, metal industry, chemical industry, etc.), river resources natural, forests, and the region is also known for the fact that many people did temporary jobs abroad. The area is oriented towards the West with convincing indicators of a very rapid integration into European cultural, economic and civilizational trends.

== Culture ==
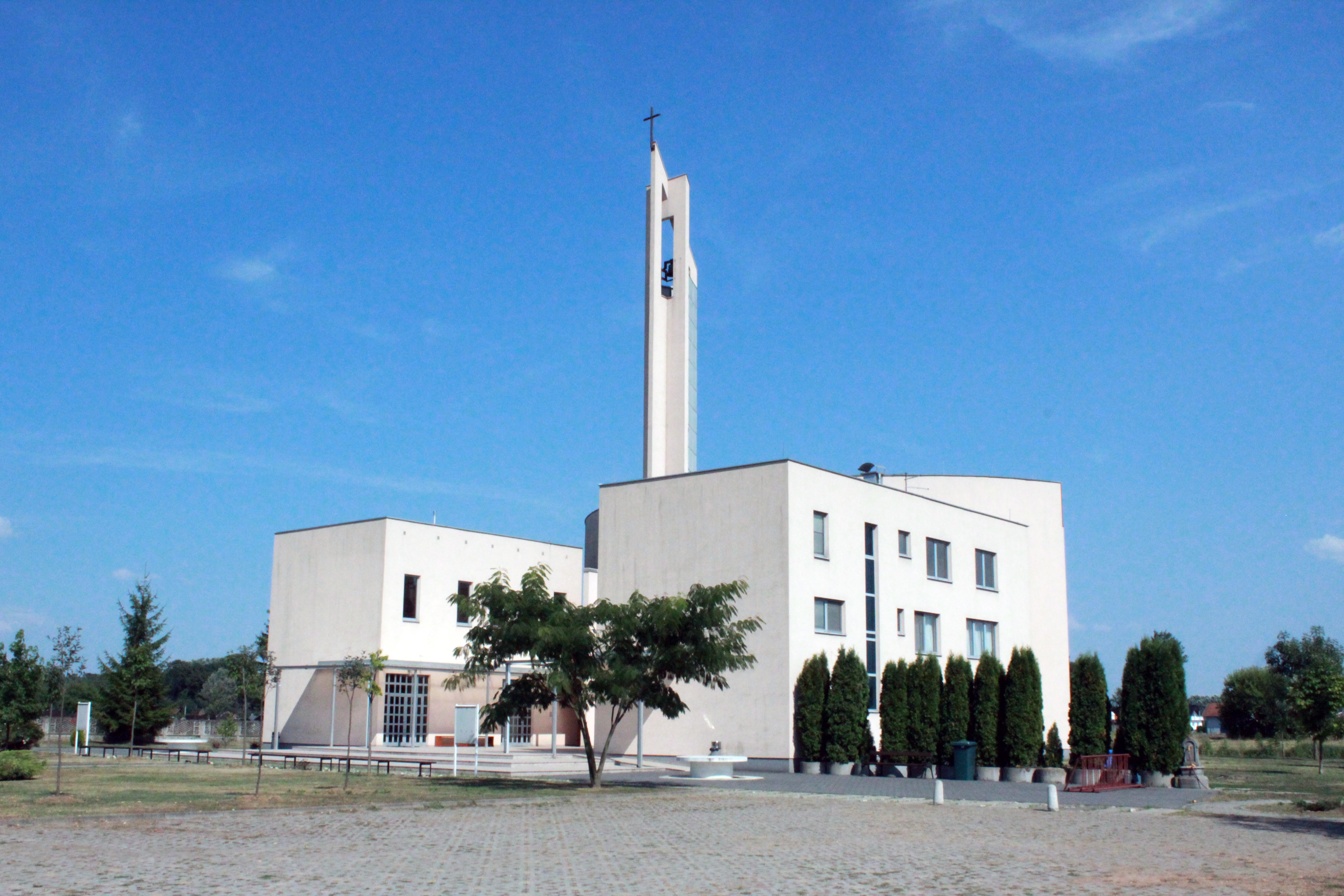
The church of St Jacob in Grebnice

=== Sport ===
HNK Orašje, the local football club from Orašje that won the Bosnia and Herzegovina Football Cup in the 2005–06 season.

=== Religion ===
The majority of its population professes Christianity, with the Catholic Church being the most important denomination within the population with 33,191 inhabitants in the Canton of Posavina (representing more than 77 percent of the population). The most significant non-Christian minority is made up of Muslims (8,341 inhabitants) and there are also other Christians such as members of the Serbian Orthodox Church (841 inhabitants).

== See also ==
- Political divisions of Bosnia and Herzegovina
- List of heads of the Posavina Canton
