= Međuopštinska fudbalska liga Doboj =

- Country: Bosnia and Herzegovina
- Region: Doboj
- Confederation: UEFA
- Number of clubs: 9 (2018/19)
- Level on pyramid: 6
- Promotion to: Regional League Doboj

The Intermunicipal League Doboj (Bosnian: Međuopštinska liga Doboj) is a sixth level league in the Bosnia and Herzegovina football league system and a fifth level league in the Republika Srpska.

== League champions ==
The league champions since 2010:

Season	Club
2010–11	FK Hajduk Kožuhe
2011–12	FK Mineral Banja Vrućica
2012–13	OFK Polet 1926 Bosanski Brod
2013–14	FK Rudar Stanari
2014–15	FK Zvijezda Kakmuž
2015–16	FK Hajduk Kožuhe
2016–17	FK Vučijak Majevac
2017–18	FK Borac Kotorsko

== Member clubs for 2014–15 ==
- FK Zvijezda – Kakmuž
- FK Hajduk – Kožuhe
- FK Polet – Podnovlje
- NK Željezničar – Pridjel Gornji
- FK 27.Juli – Kalenderovci
- OFK Zborište – Zborište
- FK Borac – Kotorsko
- FK Osinja 1975 – Osinja
- FK Borac – Bosanski Lužani
- FK 4.Juli – Pojezna
- FK BSK – Bušletić
- FK Vučijak – Majevac

== Member clubs for 2015–16 ==
- FK Zadrugar – Sjekovac
- FK Hajduk – Kožuhe
- FK Polet – Podnovlje
- NK Željezničar – Pridjel Gornji
- FK 27.Juli – Kalenderovci
- OFK Zborište – Zborište
- FK Borac – Kotorsko
- FK Osinja 1975 – Osinja
- FK Borac – Bosanski Lužani
- FK 4.Juli – Pojezna
- FK BSK – Bušletić
- FK Vučijak – Majevac
- FK Radnički – Brodsko Polje

== Member clubs for 2016–17 ==
- FK Zadrugar – Sjekovac
- FK Ozrenski Sokolovi – Boljanić
- FK Polet – Podnovlje
- NK Željezničar – Pridjel Gornji
- FK 27.Juli – Kalenderovci
- OFK Zborište – Zborište
- FK Borac – Kotorsko
- FK Borac – Bosanski Lužani
- FK 4.Juli – Pojezna
- FK BSK – Bušletić
- FK Vučijak – Majevac
- FK Radnički – Brodsko Polje

== Member clubs for 2017–18 ==
- FK Zadrugar – Sjekovac
- FK Ozrenski Sokolovi – Boljanić
- FK Polet – Podnovlje
- NK Željezničar – Pridjel Gornji
- FK 27.Juli – Kalenderovci
- OFK Zborište – Zborište
- FK Borac – Kotorsko
- FK 4.Juli – Pojezna
- FK BSK – Bušletić
- FK Radnički – Brodsko Polje

== Member clubs for 2018–19 ==
- FK Zadrugar – Sjekovac
- FK Ozrenski Sokolovi – Boljanić
- FK Polet – Podnovlje
- NK Željezničar – Pridjel Gornji
- FK 27.Juli – Kalenderovci
- OFK Zborište – Zborište
- FK Liješće – Liješće
- FK 4.Juli – Pojezna
- FK Radnički – Brodsko Polje
