= Regionalna liga Centar =

- Country: Bosnia and Herzegovina
- Region: Doboj
- Confederation: UEFA
- Number of clubs: 14
- Level on pyramid: 4
- Promotion to: Second League of the Republika Srpska
- Relegation to: Regional League Doboj
- Domestic cup: Republika Srpska Cup

The Regional League of the Republika Srpska – Center (Bosnian: Regionalna liga Republike Srpske – Centar; Serbian: Регионална лига Републике Српске – Центар) is a fourth level league in the Bosnia and Herzegovina football league system and a third-level league in the Republika Srpska.

== Member clubs for 2020–21 ==
List of clubs competing in 2020–21 season:

- FK Borac – Lužani Bosanski
- FK Crvena Zvijezda – Obudovac
- FK Hajduk – Batkuša
- FK Hajduk – Kožuhe
- FK Naša Krila – Kostajnica
- FK Ozren – Petrovo
- FK Rudanka – Rudanka
- FK Skugrić – Skugrić
- FK Sloga – Dugo Polje
- FK Sloga – Jakeš
- FK Trebava – Osječani
- FK Ukrina – Čečava
- FK Vranjak – Vranjak
- FK Vučijak – Majevac
- FK Željezničar – Doboj
- FK Zvijezda – Kakmuž
