= Područna liga Doboj =

- Country: Bosnia and Herzegovina
- Region: Doboj
- Confederation: UEFA
- Number of clubs: 14
- Level on pyramid: 5
- Promotion to: Regional League RS – Center
- Relegation to: Intermunicipal League Doboj; Intermunicipal League Modriča; Intermunicipal League Šamac

The Regional League Doboj (Bosnian: Područna liga Doboj) is a fifth level league in the Bosnia and Herzegovina football league system and a fourth level league in the Republika Srpska.

== Member clubs for 2014–15 ==
- FK Sloga – Dugo Polje
- FK Borac – Osinja
- FK Rudar – Stanari
- FK Sloga – Jakeš
- FK Crkvina – Crkvina
- FK Ukrina – Čečava
- FK Pelagićevo – Pelagićevo
- FK Bratstvo – Donja Dubica
- FK Sloboda – Vinska
- FK Kladari Gornji – Kladari Gornji
- FK Mladost – Dobrinja
- FK Zvijezda – Kruškovo Polje
- FK Zadrugar – Sijekovac
- FK Mladost – Tišina
