= Hasić =

Hasić is a Bosnian surname. Notable people with this surname include:

- Ajdin Hasić (born 2001), Bosnian footballer
- Ermin Hasić (born 1975), Bosnian-Slovenian footballer
- Jasmin Hasić, Bosnian boxer
- Šerif Hasić (born 1988), Bosnian footballer

== See also ==
- Donji Hasić, Bosnia-Herzegovina
- Gornji Hasić, Bosnia-Herzegovina
