= Modriča =

Town and municipality in Bosnia and Herzegovina

Modriča Модрича
- Town and municipality
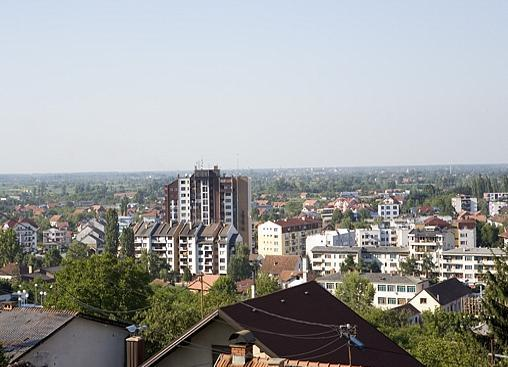
- Modriča

- Coat of arms

- Location of Modriča within Republika Srpska

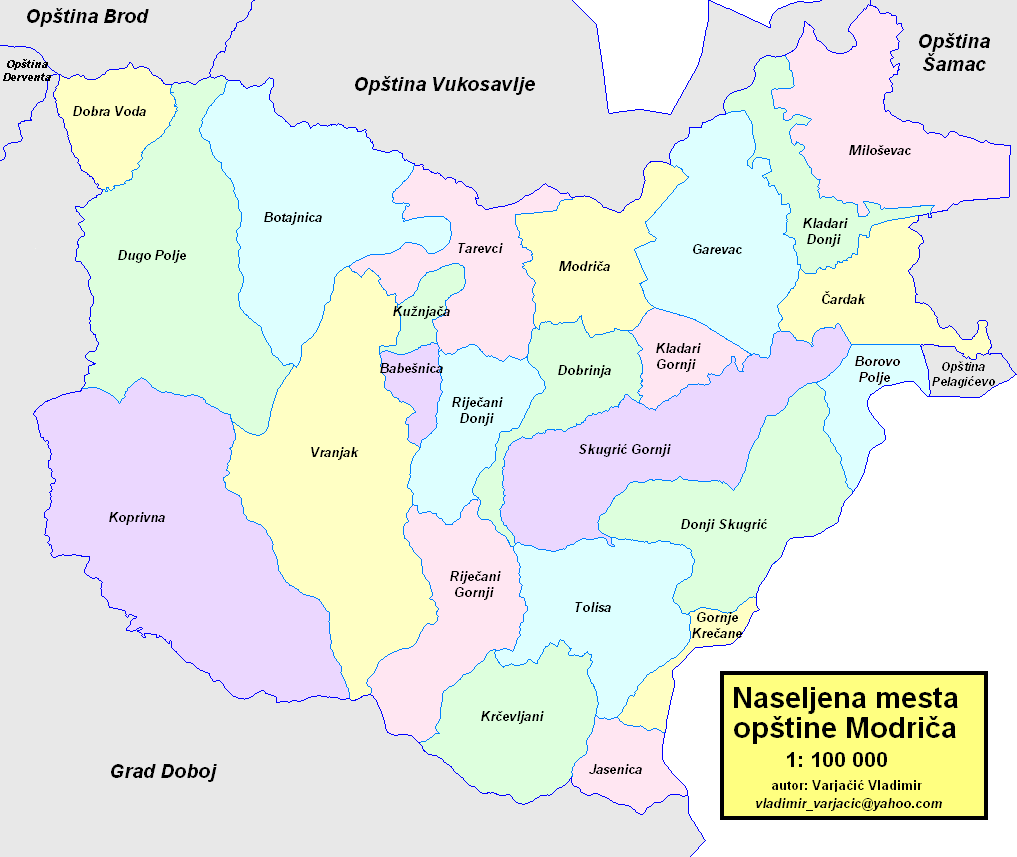
- Coordinates: 44°57′23″N 18°18′04″E
- Country: Bosnia and Herzegovina
- Entity: Republika Srpska
- Geographical region: Posavina

Government
  - Municipal mayor: Jovica Radulović (SDS)
  - Municipality: 319.8 km^{2} (123.5 sq mi)

Population (2013 census)
  - Town: 10,137
  - Municipality: 25,712
  - Municipality density: 80.40/km^{2} (208.2/sq mi)
- Time zone: UTC+1 (CET)
  - Summer (DST): UTC+2 (CEST)
- Postal code: 74480
- Area code: +387 53
- Website: www.modrica.ba

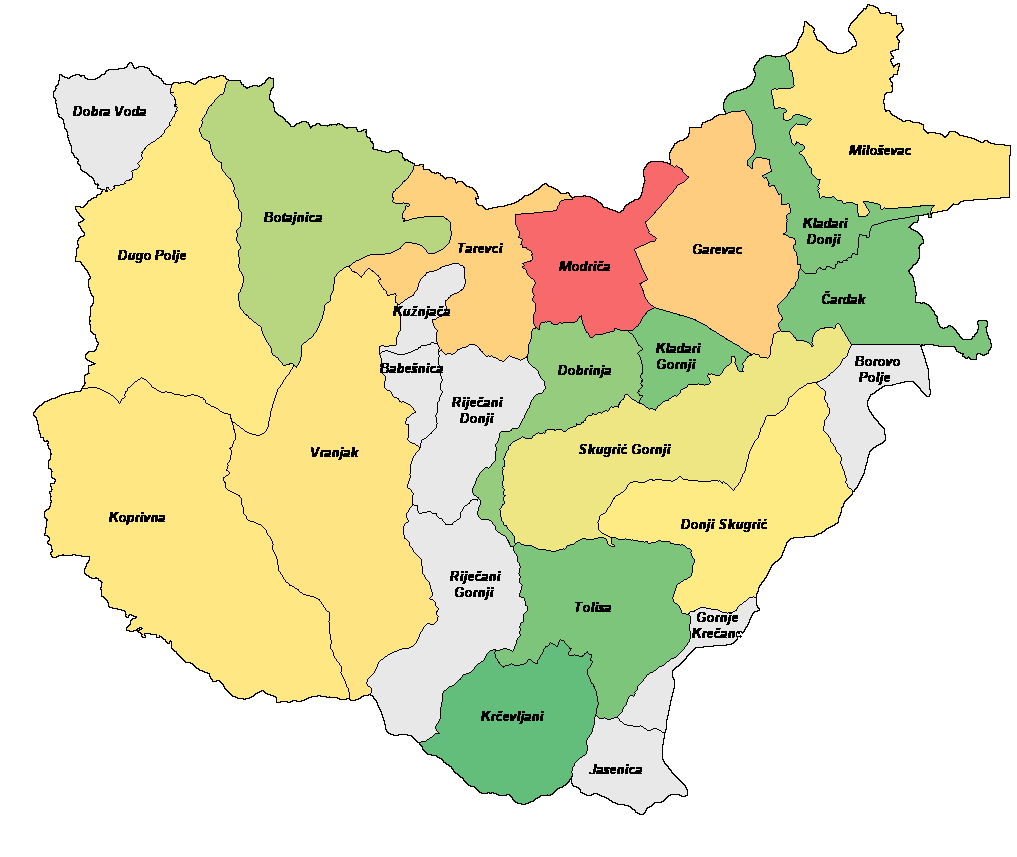
Modriča municipality by population proportional to the settlement with the highest and lowest population

Modriča (Serbian Cyrillic: Модрича) is a town and municipality in Republika Srpska, Bosnia and Herzegovina. As of 2013 census, the town has a population of 10,137 inhabitants, while the municipality has a population of 25,720 inhabitants.

== History ==
The first written document about Modriča is a 13th century charter of Hungarian King Bela IV in which Modriča is mentioned as a spring: "...fons Modricha, ubi cadit in Boznam ("...the spring of Modricha, where it falls into the Boznam")"; this indicates that it was a minor stream which was flowing into the Bosna river. According to traditional stories, Modriča was named after a small river with blue, mountain water. It is assumed that the small river is the Dusa. According to other narratives, the area bears the name of the Old Slavic marks of the blue sky and distances, which are more discerned on the horizon than visible – modrina (blue/bruise-like)/modriča.

There is archaeological evidence of human presence in the territory of present-day Modriča municipality back in the Paleolithic — Old Stone Age. This is evidenced by traces discovered at the Gradina site in the village of Dugo Polje above the valley of the Bosna river. Traces of ancient Neolithic farmers were found in several places, among others at the locations of Kulište in Kruškovo Polje, Ždralovo Brdo in the village of Kladari, Prljaca, then in the villages of Vranjak, Kužnjača, Skugrić, Dugo Polje, etc. There is an important site at Dobor hill with seven archaeological layers of the Iron Age. Traces of Old Slavic settlements can be found in several places in the Modriča municipality. In the charter of Kotromanić from 1323 the Nenavište Parish is mentioned with the settlements of Modriča and Jakeš.

The events that were developing around the Dobor fortress presaged the end of Bosnia's independence. Those were conflicts with the Hungarians in 1393/94 and 1408, and the execution of 170 Bosnian boyars on the ramparts of the fort. These areas then became a cruel war frontier in the onslaught of the Turks, and they won Dobor and Modriča in 1536. After the defeat of the Turks at Vienna in 1683, Modriča was the border area the next two centuries, which meant it was a zone of conflicts, rebellions, devastation and economic stagnation. During the Austro-Hungarian rule, Modriča was included in a list of 66 towns that Bosnia and Herzegovina had at that time.

In the second half of the 19th century economic, cultural and educational conditions were slowly improving. According to archives, schools had existed since at least the 19th century, maybe even since the end of the 18th century. Modriča had a nursery school in the rural area.

From 1929 to 1939, Modriča was part of the Vrbas Banovina and from 1939 to 1941 of the Banovina of Croatia within the Kingdom of Yugoslavia.

Conditions improved in the second half of 20th century, with a contributing factor being the Šamac-Sarajevo railroad, built in 1947, that passed through the town, with a branch line Modriča-Gradačac built in 1951. Some factories in the city were also built: an oil refinery, factories of paper and plastic boxes Pamo and Plastmo, a flour mill, the "Vjekoslav Bakulić" shoe factory, the "Hemija" chemical cleaning company and the small "8th of September" wood factory, together with the required town infrastructure (residential buildings, a secondary school, a sports hall),. The "Dr. Mujbegović (later Petar Mrkonjić)" wheat and cattle farm was also expanded. The "Modriča" volleyball team won the national championship of Yugoslavia in 1979.

After the 1992–95 Bosnian War, the pre-war municipal borders were changed, the villages of Jakeš, Pećnik and Modrički Lug were excluded from Modriča and included in the new Vukosavlje municipality, and a few villages from the western part of the pre-war Gradačac municipality were included in the Modriča municipality, thus the size of the municipality changed substantially.

== Demographics ==
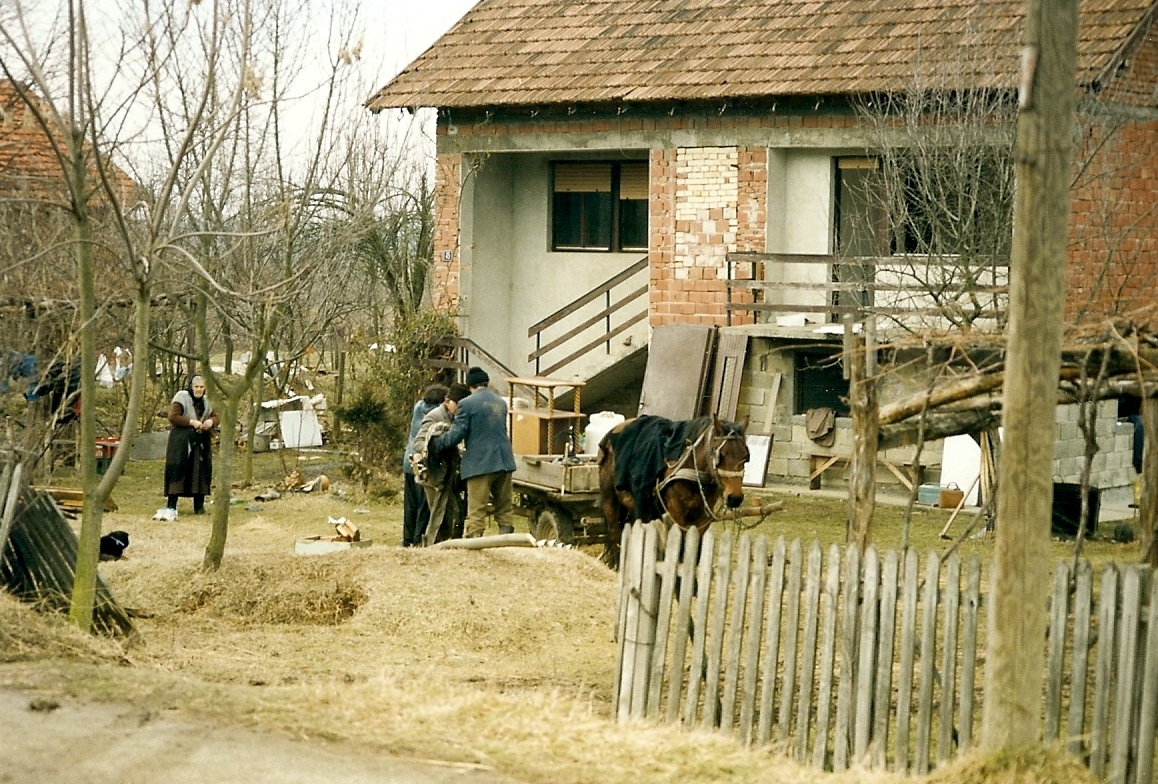
Serb families forced from their homes due to the border regulations in the Dayton Agreement from 1995

=== Population ===
Population of settlements – Modriča municipality
	Settlement	1948.	1953.	1961.	1971.	1981.	1991.	2013.
	Total	19,746	39,156		31,622	34,541	35,413	25,720
1	Botajica						1,019	579
2	Čardak						1,006	353
3	Dobrinja						437	446
4	Donji Skugrić							910
5	Dugo Polje						1,596	994
6	Garevac						2,795	2,993
7	Kladari Donji						1,046	362
8	Kladari Gornji						448	359
9	Koprivna						2,218	1,151
10	Krčevljani						282	253
11	Miloševac						1,735	1,323
12	Modriča	3,072		5,032	7,324	9,630	10,454	10,137
13	Skugrić Gornji						1,453	785
14	Tarevci						2,322	2,719
15	Tolisa						858	358
16	Vranjak						2,370	1,419

=== Ethnic composition ===
Ethnic composition – Modriča town
	2013.	1991.	1981.	1971.
Total	10,137 (100,0%)	10,454 (100,0%)	9,630 (100,0%)	7,324 (100,0%)
Serbs	6,952 (73,81%)	2,420 (23,15%)	1,841 (19,12%)	1,428 (19,50%)
Bosniaks	1,836 (19,49%)	5,252 (50,24%)	4,815 (50,00%)	4,910 (67,04%)
Others	284 (3,015%)	301 (2,879%)	138 (1,433%)	49 (0,669%)
Roma	168 (1,784%)		38 (0,395%)	3 (0,041%)
Croats	157 (1,667%)	1 134 (10,85%)	838 (8,702%)	732 (9,995%)
Montenegrins	13 (0,138%)		29 (0,301%)	25 (0,341%)
Slovenes	6 (0,064%)		4 (0,042%)	3 (0,041%)
Macedonians	2 (0,021%)		3 (0,031%)	4 (0,055%)
Albanians	1 (0,011%)		15 (0,156%)	12 (0,164%)
Yugoslavs		1 347 (12,89%)	1 904 (19,77%)	154 (2,103%)
Hungarias			5 (0,052%)	4 (0,055%)

Ethnic composition – Modriča municipality
	2013.	1991.	1981.	1971.
Total	25,720 (100,0%)	35,613 (100,0%)	34,541 (100,0%)	31,622 (100,0%)
Serbs	20,227 (78,64%)	12,534 (35,20%)	13,012 (37,67%)	13,457 (42,56%)
Bosniaks	3,101 (12,06%)	10,375 (29,13%)	8,578 (24,83%)	8,356 (26,42%)
Croats	1,674 (6,509%)	9,805 (27,53%)	9,598 (27,79%)	9,418 (29,78%)
Others	718 (2,792%)	1,048 (2,943%)	476 (1,378%)	138 (0,436%)
Yugoslavs		1,851 (5,198%)	2,755 (7,976%)	180 (0,569%)
Roma			38 (0,110%)	3 (0,009%)
Montenegrins			37 (0,107%)	32 (0,101%)
Albanians			29 (0,084%)	16 (0,051%)
Macedonians			7 (0,020%)	10 (0,032%)
Slovenes			6 (0,017%)	4 (0,013%)
Hungarias			5 (0,014%)	8 (0,025%)

== Economy ==
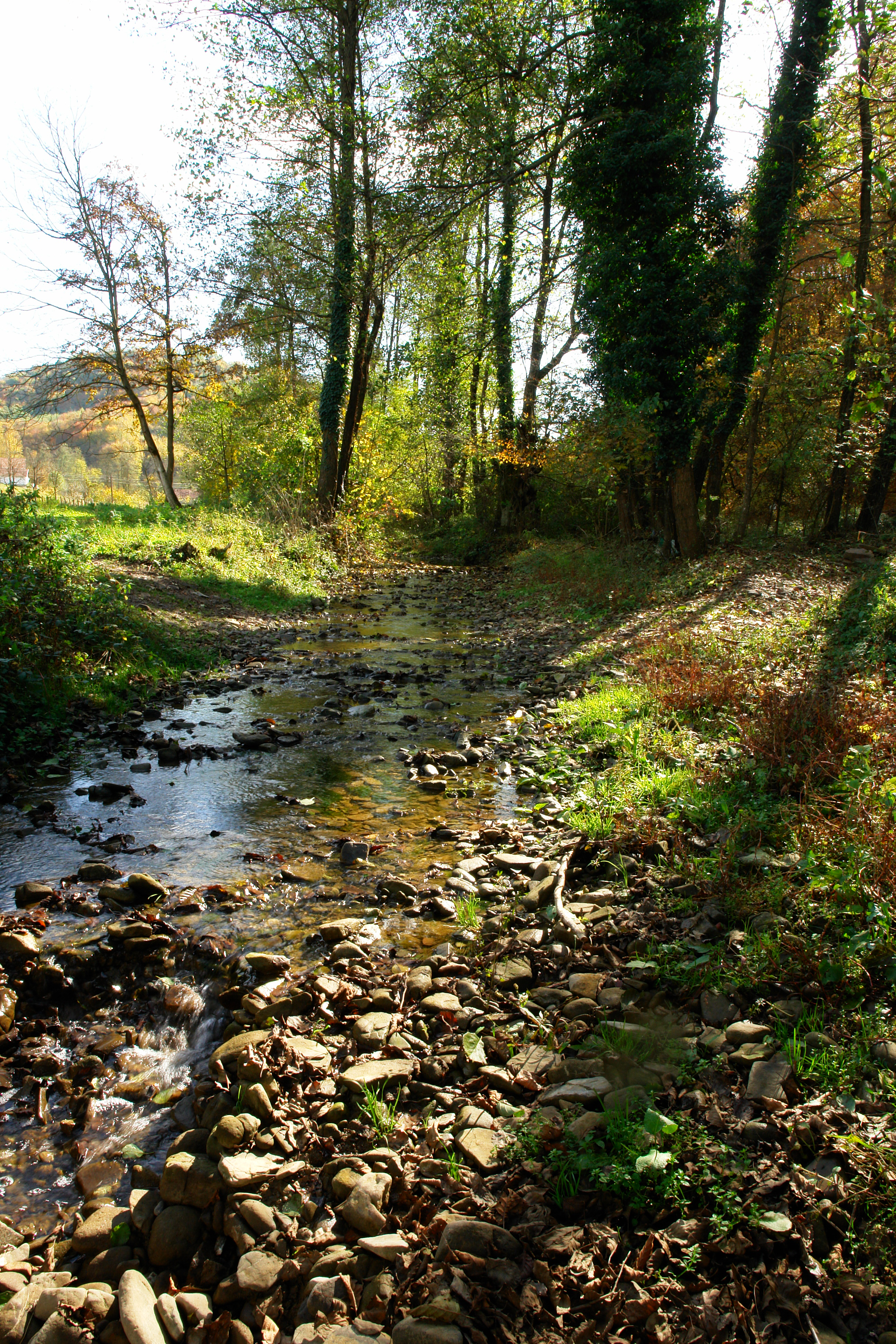
Velika Rijeka

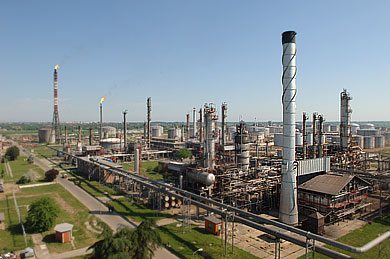
Modriča oil refinery

The Modriča oil refinery, currently owned by Russian investors, is located in Modriča.

The following table gives a preview of total number of registered employed people per their core activity (as of 2016):

Professional field	Total
Agriculture, forestry and fishing	62
Mining and quarrying	9
Manufacturing	1,475
Distribution of power, gas, steam and air-conditioning	45
Distribution of water and water waste management	80
Construction	128
Wholesale and retail, repair	803
Transportation and storage	206
Hotels and restaurants	158
Information and communication	47
Finance and insurance	47
Real estate activities	2
Professional, scientific and technical activities	90
Administrative and support services	28
Public administration and defence	270
Education	383
Healthcare and social work	325
Art, entertainment and recreation	17
Other service activities	122
Total	4,297

== Religion ==
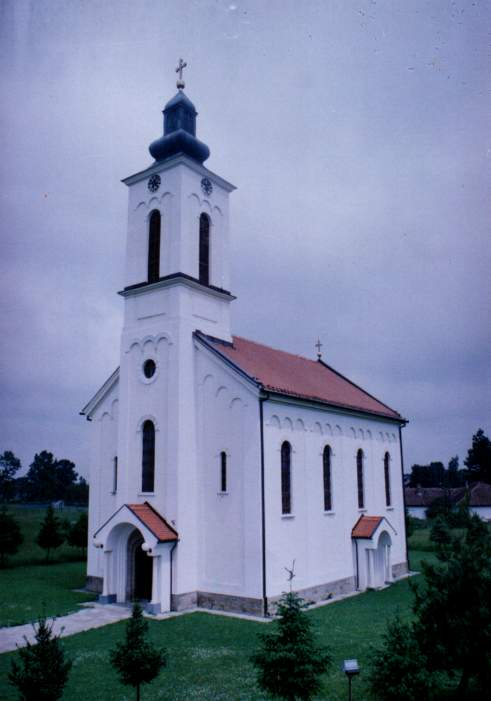
The Serbian Orthodox Church of St. Nicholas

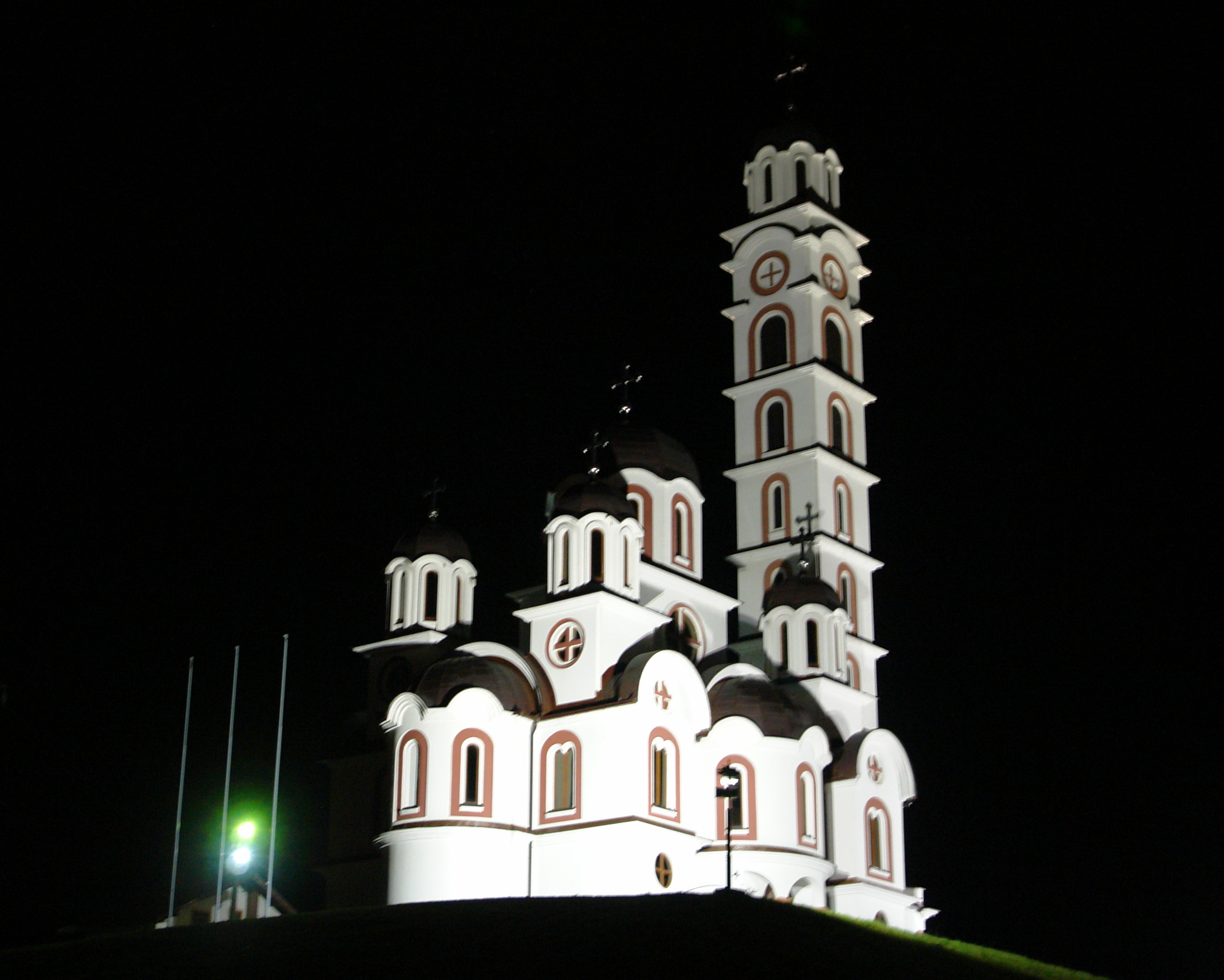
A Serbian Orthodox church in Višnjik

There are 18 churches and monasteries of the Serbian Orthodox church, five mosques and three Catholic churches in the municipality.

== Sports ==
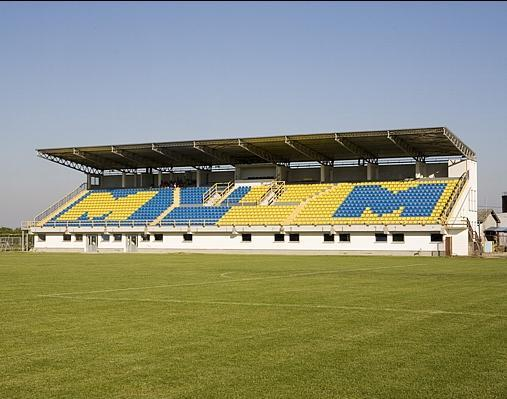
The City stadium

- FK Modriča plays in the First League of the Republika Srpska
- The local volleyball club is Modriča Optima.

== Twin towns – sister cities ==
Modriča is twinned with:

- Migliaro, Italy
- Ub, Serbia

== Notable people ==
- Avdo Karabegović - Hasanbegov (1878–1909), poet
- Kristian Kreković (1901–1985), painter
- Nada Topčagić (b. 1953), singer
- Nikola Nikić (b. 1956), footballer
- Milan Jelić (1956–2007), former President of Republika Srpska
- Sanjin Odobašić (b. 2008), Grandson of Former Yugoslav president Josip Broz Tito
- Jusuf Dajić (b. 1984), footballer
- Zdravko Kuzmanović (b. 1987), footballer
- Aleksandar Okolić (b. 1993), volleyball player
- Asim Sarvan (b. 1949), musician, a member of "S Vremena Na Vreme"

== See also ==
- Municipalities of Bosnia and Herzegovina
