= Milan Kalabić =

Serbian military officer

- Милан Калабић
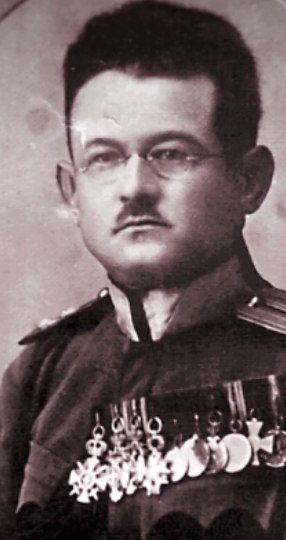
- Kalabić in uniform
- Born: 18 October 1886; Podnovlje, Doboj, Bosnia and Herzegovina, Austria-Hungary
- Died: 3 October 1942 (aged 55); Territory of the Military Commander in Serbia
- Children: Nikola Kalabić (son)
- Military career
- Allegiance: Austria-Hungary (before 1912); Kingdom of Serbia (1912–1918); Kingdom of Yugoslavia (1918–1942): Chetniks (1941–1942); Nazi Germany: Government of National Salvation (1941–1942)
- Branch: Gendarmerie
- Service years: 1912–1942
- Rank: Lieutenant Colonel
- Unit: Serbian State Guard
- Conflicts: Balkan Wars: First Balkan War; Second Balkan War; First World War; World War II in Yugoslavia

Milan Kalabić (Serbian Cyrillic: Милан Калабић; 18 October 1886 – 3 October 1942) was a Serbian military officer who fought in the Balkan Wars and the First World War and was involved with the Chetniks during the Second World War. He collaborated, from 1941 until 1942, with the collaborationist government of Milan Nedić as an officer in the Serbian State Guard and the county prefect of Požarevac. He also aided the Chetniks, which would result in his execution by the Gestapo in October 1942. He was the father of Chetnik commander Nikola Kalabić.

== Early life ==
Milan Kalabić was born on 18 October 1886 in the village of Podnovlje, near Doboj. His father, Nikola, fought in the Russo-Turkish War of 1876–78 and was involved in the liberation of Bulgaria from the Ottoman Empire. In 1912, with the start of the First Balkan War, Milan fled to the Kingdom of Serbia and joined the Serbian Army as a volunteer. He became an officer and fought in the First Balkan War, the Second Balkan War and the First World War.

== Nikšić murders ==
In February 1924, Kalabić and five other members of the gendarmerie arrested Montenegrin officers and brothers Stevan and Šćepan Mijušković along with some relatives and friends for no apparent reason. Both brothers were tortured and killed. Kalabić later informed their relatives that the two had frozen to death on the way to the prison. Seventy-five days later, the body of Šćepan Mijušković was discovered and Kalabić was forced to flee Montenegro into Kosovo. In 1930, he was tried and found guilty of the murders. He was given an eighteen-year prison sentence but was later pardoned of the crime and reappeared in Belgrade in 1940.

== Second World War and death ==
Kalabić became an officer of the Serbian State Guard (SDS) following the Axis invasion and occupation of the Kingdom of Yugoslavia. He was also appointed prefect for the county of Požarevac and passed on information and military supplies to the Chetniks, with whom his son, Nikola, fought and served as a commander. After a period of surveillance, Kalabić was arrested by the German Gestapo on 3 October 1942 and executed alongside other Chetnik prisoners.
