= Nikola Kalabić =

Serbian Chetnik leader (1906–1946)

vojvoda Nikola Kalabić
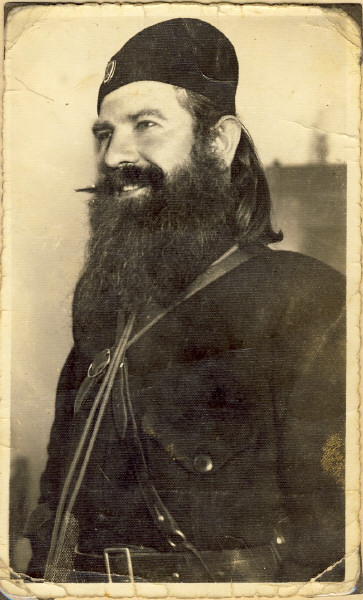
- Born: 20 December 1906; Podnovlje, Bosnia and Herzegovina, Austria-Hungary
- Died: 19 January 1946 (aged 39) near Degurić cave, Serbia, Yugoslavia
- Burial place: Unknown
- Relatives: Milan Kalabić (father)
- Military career
- Allegiance: Kingdom of Yugoslavia; Chetniks
- Branch: Army
- Service years: 1941–1945
- Rank: Lieutenant-colonel
- Unit: Gorska garda (Mountain Guard)
- Conflicts: World War II in Yugoslavia
- Awards: Order of the Yugoslav Crown

Nikola Kalabić (Serbian Cyrillic: Никола Калабић; 20 December 1906 – 19 January 1946) was a Serb and Yugoslav surveyor and Chetnik commander during World War II.

== Early life ==
He was born to father Milan and mother Joka in Podnovlje (municipality of Doboj) in present-day Bosnia and Herzegovina. He had a sister named Angelina (1912–1999).

Nikola's father separated from Joka after World War I and proceeded to get married three times. Nikola lived with his father at first so he attended school in places where his father served with the Serbian army. He eventually finished six grades of gymnasium before becoming a student of geodesy in Belgrade. During his studies, he met Borka (a year younger than him) who was born in Rajkovići near Valjevo in present-day Serbia into a family of old supporters of the People's Radical Party and Nikola Pašić. Borka and Nikola married in 1929 and on 3 August 1930 they had twins Mirjana and Milan. Their first service was in Belgrade. They then moved to Aranđelovac and finally back to Valjevo (where there are Kalabićs today). Nikola Kalabić (until the start of World War II) worked in Land-registry management in Valjevo.

== World War II ==
During World War II, Nikola Kalabić was commander of Draža Mihailović's formation named the Mountain Guard Corps (Serbian Cyrillic: Корпус горске гарде). On 26 November 1943, together with the General Inspector of Chetnik Troops Colonel Simić, he concluded a formal collaboration agreement (German: Waffenruhe-Verträge) with the representative of the German Military Commander in Southeast Europe, General der Infanterie (Lieutenant General) Hans Felber.

As part of terror against Partisans and their supporters, Kalabić's Chetniks, during the period between 31 December 1942 and April 1943, killed with cold weapons 28 people from villages near Valjevo and Kosjerić. An anonymous officer from Mountain Guard Corps wrote a letter to Draža Mihailović on 8 November complaining that terror had gone so far that people are more afraid of Chetniks than of Germans, Bulgarians and Albanians. As an example of this terror he claimed that Kalabić beat personally 3 men and a girl in village of Ljubičevac, all innocent, whom latter died as consequence of beating. On 26 November Mihailović issued an order to Kalabić saying: Continue cleansing of communists wherever you hear them...cleanse without mercy.

In the night of 25 December 1943, Chetniks under command of Nikola Kalabić killed a large number of civilians in village of Kopljare, near Aranđelovac. Out of 22 killed, 19 were Romani. In a letter to Draža Mihailović, Kalabić wrote: In Kopljere we caught while sleeping and slayed 24 active communists, out of which 20 were Gypsies, who admitted to be so-called jarugaši, at day they do their housework, but at night in action. I killed them all. There is no proof that any of the victims were involved with KPJ or involved in any armed fights. Sources of Ministry of Interior of the quisling government have a more precise description of the massacre, as they mention the murder of 22 civilians, 19 Romani, of which 15 male and 4 female. It also mentions that Chetniks burnt all Romani houses, as well as the houses of two peasants whose family members were partisans. Mountain Guard Corps under Kalabić committed similar acts of terror against the pro-partisan population in central Serbia, including a massacre in Drugovac, the single largest Chetnik massacre in any Serb village. During July and August 1944 Mountain Guard Corps led by Kalabić committed a string of robberies and beatings in villages around Prokuplje and in Dešilovac they executed 5 villagers.

On 24 October 1944, Kalabić's Chetniks from Ivanjica came to Sjenica where they joined other Chetnik units, as well as German forces, Muslim Militia and Serbian Shock Corps — the column that retreated towards Bosnia. Kalabić's troops in December had to retreat to Kladanj due to partisan victory near Šekovići, where 110 of Kalabić's men died and 40 were captured. In letter to Chetnik High Quarters on 27 December, Kalabić complained about the small amount of reinforcements (around 300 men), as well as that units under his command lacked ammunition. A Chetnik dispatch from 16 January states that Kalabić got significant supplies from Germans. The Yugoslav People's Army estimated on 25 March that joint Chetnik forces of Kalabić, Dragutin Keserović and Dragoslav Račić numbered around 2000 men, following a battle around Gradačac. On 10 or 11 May Kalabić went alongside the main Chetnik column with Mihailović towards Zelengora. Column size was estimated by the Yugoslav Army to be around 3000 men. Among captured Chetniks at Battle of Zelengora, where the Chetnik main column was defeated, were members of Kalabić's family (wife, daughter and mother-in-law). His wife and mother-in-law were sent back to Valjevo and his daughter, Mirjana, by her own wish, stayed in the Yugoslav army until demobilization. Kalabić was among the few hundred fighters who escaped capture or death at Zelengora.

On 28 June, 36 Chetniks led by Kalabić and Filip Ajdačić crossed Drina to return to Serbia in the Valjevo region. The group of outlaws led by Kalabić appeared in November on the territory of the Yugoslav First Army and killed 10 soldiers, 19 civilians and 1 policeman.

=== Capture and alleged collaboration with the OZNA ===
Near the very end of the war, Kalabić and many other Chetniks tried to hide in rural areas of the country, awaiting an attempt to overthrow the new government. The OZNA had a plan to capture former members of the Chetnik movement and other military organizations outside of Yugoslavia. There, OZNA agents infiltrated the support network of Kalabić and arrested him in a covert operation on 5 December 1945.

After a few days, Kalabić agreed to collaborate with the OZNA in their efforts of locating and arresting Draža Mihailović, in return for immunity from prosecution. This claim however has been brought into question by family members of Kalabić claiming that he did not betray Mihailović. Kalabić was then executed by Yugoslav Partisans although this claim has also been questioned.

== Rehabilitation ==
Kalabić was rehabilitated by the High Court in Valjevo in May 2017. This decision however was overturned by an appellate court in Belgrade in May 2018. On 7 August 2022, he was officially rehabilitated by the High Court in Valjevo.

== Sources ==
- Tomasevich, Jozo (1975). War and Revolution in Yugoslavia, 1941–1945: The Chetniks. Stanford: Stanford University Press. ISBN 978-0-8047-0857-9.
- Radanović, Milan (2016). Kazna i zločin: snage kolaboracije u Srbiji: odgovornost za ratne zločine (1941–1944) i vojni gubici (1944–1945) [Punishment and Crime: Collaboration Forces in Serbia: Responsibility for War Crimes (1941-1944) and Military Losses (1944-1945)] (in Serbo-Croatian). Belgrade, Serbia: Rosa Luxemburg Stiftung. ISBN 978-86-88745-16-1.
