= Zborište =

Zborište may refer to:

- Zborište, Brod, a village in Bosnia and Herzegovina
- Zborište, Velika Kladuša, a village in Bosnia and Herzegovina
