= League of Una-Sana Canton =

Bosnia and Herzegovina football league

League of Una-Sana Canton (Bosnian: Kantonalna Liga NS USK-A) is a fourth level league in the Bosnia and Herzegovina football league system. The league champion is promoted to the Second League of the Federation of Bosnia and Herzegovina - West.

== Member clubs ==
List of clubs competing in 2020–21 season:

- NK Bajer 99
- NK Borac Izačić
- NK Bratstvo Bosanska Krupa
- NK Ključ
- NK Mladost Vrnograč
- NK Omladinac 75
- NK Omladinac Sanica
- NK Željezničar Bosanska Krupa
