= League of Bosnian Podrinje Canton =

Bosnia and Herzegovina football league

League of Bosnian Podrinje Canton (Bosnian: Kantonalna Liga Bosansko - Podrinjskog Kantona) is a fourth level league in the Bosnia and Herzegovina football league system. The league champion is promoted to the Second League of the Federation of Bosnia and Herzegovina - Center.

== Member clubs ==
List of clubs competing in 2020–21 season:

- NK BKB Berič-Bogušići
- FK Drina Goražde
- FK Jahorina - Prača
- FK Radnički Goražde
