= Novo Selo, Šamac =

Novo Selo Ново Село (Serbian)
- Village (Selo)
- Location within Bosnia and Herzegovina
- Coordinates: 45°1′22″N 18°29′59″E
- Country: Bosnia and Herzegovina
- Entity: Republika Srpska
- Municipality: Šamac
- Time zone: UTC+1 (CET)
  - Summer (DST): UTC+2 (CEST)

Novo Selo (Serbian Cyrillic: Ново Село) is a village in the municipality of Šamac, Bosnia and Herzegovina. The etymology of the village comes from Slavic languages meaning new village, Novo Selo.
