= Pridjel Gornji =

- Village
- Location within Bosnia and Herzegovina
- Coordinates: 44°41′38″N 18°4′33″E
- Country: Bosnia and Herzegovina
- Entity: Republika Srpska
- Municipality: Doboj

Area
  - Total: 1.92 km^{2} (0.74 sq mi)

Population (2013)
  - Total: 836
- Time zone: UTC+1 (CET)
  - Summer (DST): UTC+2 (CEST)
- Postal code: 74000
- Area code: 053 265

Pridjel Gornji (Cyrillic: Придјел Горњи) is a village in the municipality of Doboj, Bosnia and Herzegovina. This is a small village in the Doboj Region (Republic of Srpska, Bosnia and Herzegovina) and is a part of Doboj municipality.

== History ==
Its oldest and original name, as it is recorded in Turkish defter in early 16th century, reads Pridol. In this form the name with rare precision explains the position of the natural location of the village, on the border between the highlands of Ozren mountain and spacious plains formed by valley of the river Bosna, very extended around Doboj, and valley of Usora mouth. Because the settlement is located on the edge of highlands, just above the plains, medieval man of Slavic linguistic background very well and accurately determined the name Pridol. Speaking of names of villages in historical documents that mentions this village, there is another Turkish document, written at the beginning of the 18th century, in 1711. In this document the village was registered as Pridil, and thus became the present form of this name. But this name seized its persuasiveness of original language form, the relations between the village and the area given to Pridol in the Middle Ages by its founders. In the period between the World War I and World War II, place was called Muslim Pridil (based on the composition of the population). After the 1945 the place is called Pridjel II, and Pridjel Donji (Serbian population) is called Pridjel I. The Law of Renaming Places in SR BiH from November 12, 1981, constitutes the official names as Pridjel Donji and Pridjel Gornji.

== Demographics ==
About 98% of the inhabitants of Pridjel Gornji are Bosniaks.

== Sport ==
Favourite sports activity in Pridjel Gornji is football, and the local football club, NK Željezničar, plays in the MLF Doboj.
