= Srednja Slatina =

Srednja Slatina Средња Слатина (Serbian)
- Village (Selo)
- Location within Bosnia and Herzegovina
- Coordinates: 44°56′55″N 18°29′25″E
- Country: Bosnia and Herzegovina
- Entity: Republika Srpska
- Municipality: Šamac
- Time zone: UTC+1 (CET)
  - Summer (DST): UTC+2 (CEST)

Srednja Slatina (Serbian Cyrillic: Средња Слатина) is a village in the municipality of Šamac, Bosnia and Herzegovina.
