= Kristian Kreković =

Kristian Kreković (1901–1985) was a Bosnian painter of portraits and ethnographic art. Later in life he became known for his fascination with Incan art, and spent a number of years living in Peru.

From 1960 on, he resided in Palma de Mallorca, Spain, where he died in 1985. Mallorca has a museum named after him and devoted predominantly to his art.

== Career ==
Kreković is believed to have been born in the village of Koprivna near Modriča, Bosnia and Herzegovina, to a Bosnian Croat family originally from the region of Lika (modern-day Croatia). At the end of World War I Kreković went to Vienna to study, although he eventually completed his studies in Paris. His first public exhibition was in 1925 in the Lounge des Artistes Français. In 1928 he was made a member of the French Society of Visual Arts and awarded the gold medal in the Bordeaux exhibition of international art.

In 1930, Kreković he began travelling with his wife Sina to Peru, where he was to reside for a period of 35 years. During this time Kreković studied many aspects of the Incan civilisation, and often travelled in the Andes looking for indigenous subjects to paint. He travelled back to Europe on several occasions during this period, and at various stages was commissioned to paint portraits of Queen Elizabeth of the United Kingdom and a number of other members of European royal houses.

In 1931, Kreković became friends with and painted a portrait of Mahatma Gandhi, who is quoted as saying "The sentiment of Kristian Kreković towards the world is unique. It impregnates all his art, and it impregnates it with extraordinary creativity and constructive character."

He spent World War II in Zagreb. After the war he was tried by the Yugoslav government, along with Lovro von Matačić and Tin Ujević, for his painting of the fascist general Ante Pavelić.

In 1955, the Peruvian Government sponsored an exhibit of Kreković's Incan-inspired ethnographic art throughout the United States. On this tour Kreković insisted on being characterised as a "Croatian-born Peruvian artist" which resulted in protests from the embassy of Yugoslavia.

In 1965, he settled in Palma de Mallorca, where in 1977 he built the Museum of Palma de Mallorca with his works of art, now known as Museu Kreković (Collección Pintor Kreković). The Kreković Museum was officially opened in 1981 by Queen Sofía of Spain. Kreković died in his home in Mallorca in 1985.

== Body of work ==
In addition to his extensive portrayal of Peruvian and Incan subjects, Kreković painted portraits of many ministers, statesmen, and outstanding persons, including:

- Mahatma Gandhi (1931)
- Queen Mary (in 1938; portrait kept in Buckingham Palace)
- Royal Family of Spain (King Juan Carlos and Queen Sophia)
- Royal Family of Sweden (in 1948)
- Queen Marie of Romania
