= Miroslav Trifunović =

Serbian Chetnik leader and collaborator (1894–1945)

- Мирослав Трифуновић
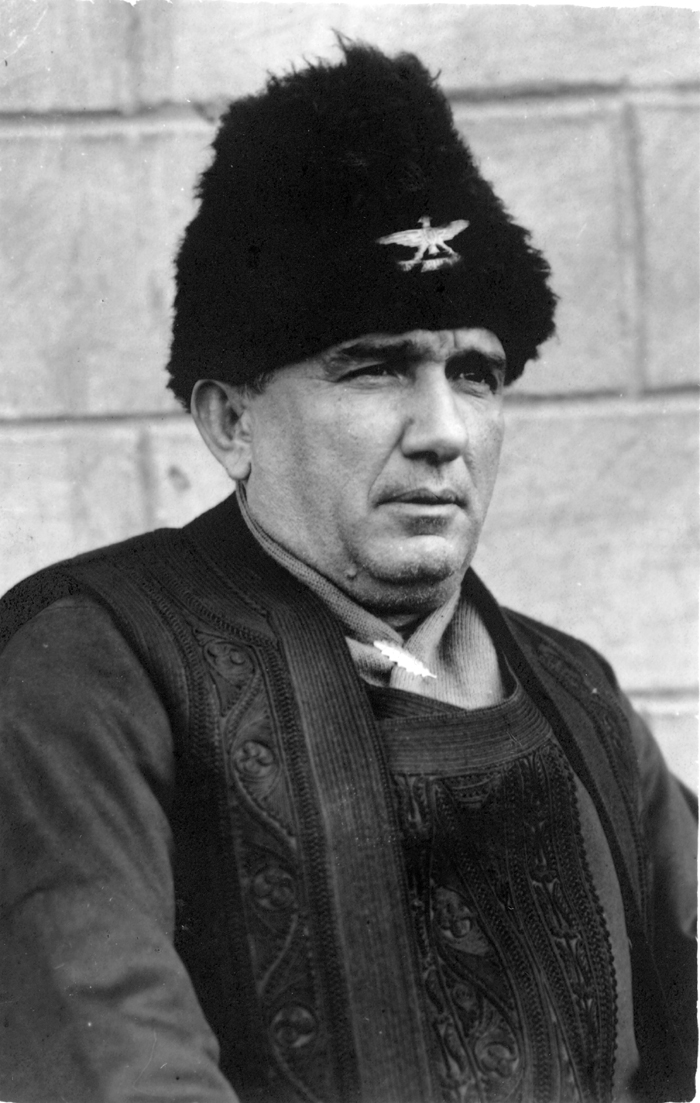
- Born: August 14, 1894; Kragujevac, Kingdom of Serbia
- Died: May 13, 1945 (aged 50); Zelengora, Bosnia and Herzegovina, DF Yugoslavia
- Military career
- Allegiance: Serbia (1910–1918); Yugoslavia (1918–1941) (Kingdom of Yugoslavia) Yugoslav government-in-exile (1941–1944); Chetniks (1941–1945)
- Rank: general
- Nickname: Dronja
- Commands: Chetnik commander of Serbia
- Conflicts: World War II in Yugoslavia; Battle of Zelengora †

Miroslav Trifunović (Serbian Cyrillic: Мирослав Трифуновић; 14 August 1894 – 13 May 1945) was a brigadier general in the Royal Yugoslav Army and later served as commander of the Chetniks in occupied Serbia during World War II.

== World War II ==
In May 1942, Draža Mihailović appointed General Trifunović as the commander of Serbia before leaving for Montenegro. On September 2, 1942, as part of the Allied mission to the Chetnik movement, Trifunović received paratroopers who delivered a radio station and codes for communication between the British government and Mihailović's Chetnik forces.

According to Dragiša Vasić, Trifunović allegedly ordered the murder of journalist Dragan Sotirović in 1943. Sotirović worked for the Chetnik newspaper Sloboda ili smrt (Freedom or Death) and was suspected of maintaining communication between Chetnik and Partisan commanders, as well as being a member of the British intelligence. Trifunović monitored the Battle of Višegrad in early October 1943.

In March 1944, General Trifunović, representing Mihailović, met with Milan Aćimović and a representative of Hermann Neubacher, a German official for Southeastern Europe, in the village of Vranići near Čačak. A second meeting was held in mid-April in the village of Trbušani, attended by Trifunović, Živko Topalović and Predrag Raković, with Aćimović and Neubacher's representative. The purpose of these meetings was to coordinate Chetnik and German operations against the Partisans and for the Germans to provide the Chetniks with weapons.

On the initiative of Neubacher, General Trifunović met with Dimitrije Ljotić in Brđani near Čačak on May 17–19, 1944. At this meeting, they agreed to establish an anti-communist alliance between the Chetniks and the forces of the Government of National Salvation.

On July 24, Trifunović led the Velika Morava Chetnik group in a battle against the Partisans, which resulted in heavy losses for the Chetnik forces; 450 Chetniks were killed and 50 captured. Due to the large number of deserters among the Chetniks, many of whom joined the Partisans, Trifunović issued two orders to execute captured deserters who joined the Partisans.

On September 5, Trifunović ordered the Chetniks under his command not to engage in combat with the Red Army, believing that the "Russians" were the allies of the Chetniks and that the only enemies were "Tito's gangs". The next day, the Serbian State Guard and the Serbian Volunteer Corps came under the command of Trifunović.

On September 9, Chetniks from Svilajnac attacked a small German garrison in the town. Trifunović ordered that only attacks against the Partisans were permitted and that anyone who disobeyed would be executed on the spot.

Before Mihailović fled Serbia at the end of September 1944, he instructed Trifunović to leave some Chetniks in Serbia to organize guerrilla activities with the remaining Chetniks. Trifunović delegated Predrag Raković to prepare Chetnik actions for the spring of 1945. Until November 7, Trifunović and the Chetnik headquarters for Serbia remained in Sjenica alongside German troops. In November 1944, Trifunović and the remaining Chetnik units began to retreat with the Germans from Sandžak towards Bosnia. According to Army Group E, Trifunović's Chetnik column, which had retreated with them from Prijepolje, numbered between 10,000 and 14,000, with an additional 4,000 members of the Serbian Shock Corps.

On May 10 and 11, 1945, the Chetnik forces were divided into two groups. Trifunović was part of the main Chetnik column, led by Mihailović, which tried to go through Zelengora and to cross Drina into Serbia. Trifunović was killed during the Battle of Zelengora on May 13, 1945, which was fought between the Yugoslav People's Army and the Chetniks.

== Sources ==
- Pavlowitch, Stevan K. (2008). Hitler's new disorder: the Second World War in Yugoslavia. Columbia University Press. ISBN 978-0-231-70050-4.
- Milovanović, Kosta (1983a). Kontrarevolucionarni pokret Draže Mihailovića: Poraz [Counter-Revolutionary movement of Draža Mihailović: Defeat] (in Serbo-Croatian). Belgrade: Slovo Ljubve. OCLC 491065064.
- Milovanović, Kosta (1983b). Kontrarevolucionarni pokret Draže Mihailovića: Rasulo [Counter-Revolutionary movement of Draža Mihailović: Chaos] (in Serbo-Croatian). Belgrade: Slovo Ljubve. OCLC 491065064.
- Milovanović, Kosta (1983c). Kontrarevolucionarni pokret Draže Mihailovića: Slom [Counter-Revolutionary movement of Draža Mihailović: Collapse] (in Serbo-Croatian). Belgrade: Slovo Ljubve. OCLC 491065064.
- Latas, Branko & Dželebdžić, Milovan (1979). Četnički pokret Draže Mihailovića 1941–1945 [Chetnik Movement of Draža Mihailović 1941–1945] (in Serbo-Croatian). Belgrade: Beogradski izdavačko-grafički zavod [Belgrade Publishing and Graphic Institute]. OCLC 561551923.
- Radanović, Milan (2016). Kazna i Zločin: Snage kolaboracije u Srbiji [Punishment and crime: Forces of collaboration in Serbia] (in Serbo-Croatian). Belgrade: Rosa Luxemburg Stiftung.
