= Bosnia and Herzegovina football league system =

Series of connected leagues for football clubs in Bosnia and Herzegovina

The Bosnia and Herzegovina football league system is a series of connected leagues for football clubs in Bosnia and Herzegovina. The system is hierarchical, with promotion and relegation between leagues at different levels. The top division is organized by the Football Association of Bosnia and Herzegovina, the second and third levels by entity associations, and lower levels by cantonal or regional associations.

== Structure ==
The Premier League of Bosnia and Herzegovina is at the top of the structure. It is the top flight in Bosnian club football and has 10 teams. The League champion is also the champion of Bosnia and Herzegovina and has the right to play in the UEFA Champions League qualifying rounds. The bottom two teams of the table are relegated to the second level of the competition.

The second tier is divided into two leagues – the First League of the Federation of Bosnia and Herzegovina and the First League of the Republika Srpska – the former containing 16, and the latter 14 clubs. Relegated teams from the Premier League are demoted to the second-level competition in the next season. Geographical location is the criterion for decided decision in which one of these two leagues the teams will play. The winner of each league is promoted to the Premier League, and the bottom teams are relegated. The number of relegated teams depends on how many teams enter from the Premier League and the Third Divisions.

Third-level football is even more dispersed. Each league is associated with a different geographical area. In the Federation of Bosnia and Herzegovina, there are four second divisions, and in Republika Srpska two second divisions. The same principle of promotion and relegation is used, so the league winners are promoted to the appropriate second-level league, and clubs at the bottom of the table are relegated to the lower levels.

There are cantonal football associations in nine of the ten cantons which make up the Federation of Bosnia and Herzegovina. They each organize clubs into one or more leagues, depending on the number of clubs they control. In Republika Srpska, which has no cantons, there are instead four football regions, each of which has a league. The first leagues in the Federation cantons and the regional leagues in Republika Srpska constitute the fourth level of club football.

Further down, there are many different types of organization. Some cantons (with many clubs) have second leagues, and there are also municipality and inter-municipality leagues for clubs not associated with any cantonal or regional league.

== System ==
Level /Tier	League(s)/Division(s)						
1	Premier League of Bosnia and Herzegovina; 10 clubs						
2	First League of the Federation of Bosnia and Herzegovina; 16 clubs				First League of Republika Srpska; 14 clubs		
3	Second League of the FBH: North 16 clubs	Second League of the FBH: Center 16 clubs	Second League of the FBH: South 16 clubs	Second League of the FBH: West 16 clubs	Second League of RS - West; 17 clubs		Second League of RS - East; 16 clubs
4	First League of Tuzla Canton (16 clubs); First League of Posavina Canton (14 clubs)	League of Sarajevo Canton (18 clubs in 2 groups); League of Zenica-Doboj Canton (9 clubs); League of Bosnian Podrinje Canton (5 clubs)	Intercounty League of Canton 10 / West Herzegovina Canton (9 clubs); League of Hercegovina-Neretva Canton (9 clubs)	First League of Central Bosnia Canton (17 clubs in 2 groups); League of Una-Sana Canton (8 clubs)	Regional League of RS - West (14 clubs)	Regional League of RS - Center (14 clubs)	Regional League of RS - East (16 clubs)
5	Second League of Tuzla Canton - West (16 clubs); Second League of Tuzla Canton - North (16 clubs); Second League of Tuzla Canton - South (16 clubs); Second of Posavina Canton (5 clubs)				Regional League Banja Luka (14 clubs); Regional League Gradiška (14 clubs); Regional League Prijedor (10 clubs)	Regional League Doboj-Brod (9 clubs) Regional League Modriča-Šamac (18 clubs in 2 groups)	Fourth League Posavina (14 clubs); Fourth League Semberija (14 clubs); Regional League Birač (10 clubs)
6	Third League of Tuzla Canton - East (8 clubs); Third League of Tuzla Canton - North (8 clubs); Third League of Tuzla Canton - South (8 clubs)				Municipal League Gradiška (8 clubs); Intermunicipal League Laktaši-Srbac-Prnjavor (7 clubs); Intermunicipal League Prijedor (7 clubs)	Intermunicipal League Doboj (14 clubs); Intermunicipal League Modriča (8 clubs); Intermunicipal League Šamac (6 clubs)	First League of the Municipal Football Association of Brčko District (8 clubs); First Municipal League Bijeljina - West (12 clubs); First Municipal League Bijeljina - East (12 clubs); Municipal League Ugljevik (4 clubs)
7							Second Municipal League Bijeljina - West (8 clubs); Second Municipal League Bijeljina - East (8 clubs)

== Cup competition ==
The Bosnia and Herzegovina Football Cup usually starts in spring with qualification matches. Those matches are played between lower league clubs on canton (Federation of Bosnia and Herzegovina) or region (Republika Srpska) level. Best teams qualify to entity cups which are qualifying competitions for the national cup.

In the first round of the national cup, 10 Premier League teams are joined by most teams from the First League of FBiH and the First League of RS.
