= First League of Tuzla Canton =

First League of Tuzla Canton (Bosnian: Prva Liga TK) is a fourth level league in the Bosnia and Herzegovina football league system. The league champion is promoted to the Second League of the Federation of Bosnia and Herzegovina - North.

== Member clubs ==
List of clubs competing in 2020–21 season:

- NK Čelić
- NK Doboj Istok
- NK Ingram
- FK Jedinstvo 1952
- NK Jedinstvo Lukavica
- FK Mladost 78
- NK Mladost-Brijesnica
- NK Mladost Gornje Živinice
- FK Mladost Kikači
- NK Mramor Babice
- NK Omladinac 68
- FK Polet Palanka
- NK Rijeka Šerići
- FK Sloga Tojšići
- NK Trešnjevka Maoča
- NK Vražići 92
