= Gajevi (Šamac) =

Gajevi Гајеви (Serbian)
- Village (Selo)
- Location within Bosnia and Herzegovina
- Coordinates: 44°56′19″N 18°27′4″E
- Country: Bosnia and Herzegovina
- Entity: Republika Srpska; Federation of Bosnia and Herzegovina
- Region Canton: Doboj; Tuzla
- Municipality: Šamac; Gradačac

Area
  - Total: 2.10 sq mi (5.45 km^{2})

Population (2013)
  - Total: 488
  - Density: 232/sq mi (89.5/km^{2})
- Time zone: UTC+1 (CET)
  - Summer (DST): UTC+2 (CEST)

Gajevi (Serbian Cyrillic: Гајеви) is a village in the municipalities of Šamac (Republika Srpska) and Gradačac, Bosnia and Herzegovina.

== Demographics ==
According to the 2013 census, its population was 488, with 463 of them living in the Šamac part and 25 (all Bosniaks) in the Gradačac part.

Ethnicity in 2013
Ethnicity	Number	Percentage
Serbs	458	93.9%
Bosniaks	25	5.1%
Croats	3	0.6%
other/undeclared	2	0.4%
Total	488	100%
