= Škarić =

Škarić Шкарић (Serbian)
- Village (Selo)
- Location within Bosnia and Herzegovina
- Coordinates: 45°02′N 18°27′E
- Country: Bosnia and Herzegovina
- Entity: Republika Srpska
- Municipality: Šamac
- Time zone: UTC+1 (CET)
  - Summer (DST): UTC+2 (CEST)

Škarić (Serbian Cyrillic: Шкарић) is a village in the municipality of Šamac, Bosnia and Herzegovina.
