= First League of Central Bosnia Canton =

First League of Central Bosnia Canton (Bosnian: Prva Kantonalna Liga SBK) is a fourth level league in the Bosnia and Herzegovina football league system. The league champion is promoted to the Second League of the Federation of Bosnia and Herzegovina - West. It is divided in two groups.

== Member clubs ==
=== Group A ===
List of clubs competing in 2020–21 season:

- NK Bilalovac CPU
- NK Brnjaci
- FK Fojnica
- FK Kaćuni
- NK Katarina
- OFK Lugovi
- NK Romari Vitez
- NK Šantići

=== Group B ===
List of clubs competing in 2020–21 season:

- FK Dnoluka
- NK Elektrobosna
- NK Gorica Guča Gora
- NK Karaula
- NK Metalleghe-BSI
- NK Mladost Nević Polje
- NK Nova Bila
