= Šamac oil field =

Oil field in Šamac, Bosnia and Herzegovina

Šamac
- Location within Bosnia and Herzegovina
- Country: Bosnia and Herzegovina
- Offshore/onshore: onshore
- Coordinates: 45°03′38″N 18°28′3″E
- Operator: Energopetrol

Field history
- Discovery: 2004

Production
- Current production of oil: 0 barrels per day (~0 t/a)
- Estimated oil in place: 500 million tonnes (~ 570×10^{6} m^{3} or 3600 million bbl)

The Šamac oil field is an oil field located in Šamac. It was discovered in 2004 and developed by Energopetrol (EP). The total proven reserves of the Šamac oil field are around 3.6 billion barrels (500 million tonnes), and production is supposed to be centered on 200,000 barrels per day (32,000 m^{3}/d). If the information regarding this oil field is correct, then it is the largest onshore oil field in Europe.
