= Pisari (Šamac) =

Pisari Писари (Serbian)
- Village (Selo)
- Location within Republika Srpska Location within Bosnia and Herzegovina
- Coordinates: 45°02′31″N 18°26′39″E
- Country: Bosnia and Herzegovina
- Entity: Republika Srpska
- Municipality: Šamac
- Time zone: UTC+1 (CET)
  - Summer (DST): UTC+2 (CEST)
- Postal code: 76239

Pisari (Serbian Cyrillic: Писари) is a village in the municipality of Šamac, Republika Srpska, Bosnia and Herzegovina.
