= First League of Posavina Canton =

Fourth-level league in the Bosnia and Herzegovina football league system

First League of Posavina Canton (Bosnian: PRrva Županijska Nogometna Liga Posavine) is a fourth level league in the Bosnia and Herzegovina football league system. The league champion is promoted to the Second League of the Federation of Bosnia and Herzegovina - North.

== Member clubs ==
List of clubs competing in 2020–21 season:

- NK 19 Srpanj
- NK Bok
- HNK Dragovoljac Novo Selo
- NK Frankopan
- NK Hajduk Orašje
- HNK Kostrč
- NK Mladi Zadrugar
- HNK Mladost Domaljevac
- HNK Mladost Donji Svilaj
- FK Mladost Sibovac
- NK Napredak Matići
- NK Sloga Prud
- NK Sloga Tolisa
- NK Vitanovići 78
