= Zasavica (Šamac) =

Zasavica Засавица (Serbian)
- Village (Selo)
- Location of Zasavica in Bosnia and Herzegovina
- Coordinates: 45°01′50″N 18°25′14″E
- Country: Bosnia and Herzegovina
- Entity: Republika Srpska
- Municipality: Šamac
- Elevation: 87 m (285 ft)

Population (1991)
  - Total: 558
- Time zone: UTC+1 (CET)
  - Summer (DST): UTC+2 (CEST)
- Website: www.zasavica.com

Zasavica (Serbian Cyrillic: Засавица) is a small village in the municipality of Šamac. The Bosna River flows near the village.

== Census ==
Zasavica
year	1991	1981	1971
Croats	524 (93.90%)	506 (93.01%)	512 (97.52%)
Serbs	6 (1.07%)	5 (0.91%)	8 (1.52%)
Bosniaks	5 (0.89%)	0	0
Yugoslavs	18 (3.22%)	22 (4.04%)	3 (0.57%)
Other and unknown	5 (0.89%)	11 (2.02%)	2 (0.38%)
total	558	544	525

== Sources ==
- Book: "Ethnic Composition of the population - Search for the Republic by municipalities and populated areas 1991th (sic!)", statistical bulletin no. 234, Release of the Central Bureau of Statistics of Bosnia and Herzegovina, Sarajevo.
- Internet - source "list for local communities" - https://web.archive.org/web/20131005002409/http://www.fzs.ba/Podaci/nacion%20po%20mjesnim.pdf
