= Kornica, Bosnia and Herzegovina =

Kornica Корница (Serbian)
- Village (Selo)
- Location within Bosnia and Herzegovina
- Coordinates: 44°57′19″N 18°25′43″E
- Country: Bosnia and Herzegovina
- Entity: Republika Srpska
- Municipality: Šamac
- Time zone: UTC+1 (CET)
  - Summer (DST): UTC+2 (CEST)
- Area code: 53

Kornica (Serbian Cyrillic: Корница) is a village in Bosnia and Herzegovina in the Republika Srpska entity's municipality of Šamac.

== Demographics ==
=== Ethnic composition, 1991 census ===
total: 830

- Croats - 802 (96.62%)
- Serbs - 8 (0.96%)
- Yugoslavs - 2 (0.24%)
- Bosniaks - 1 (0.12%)
- others and unknown - 17 (2.04%)
