= Boljanić =

Boljanić Бољанић
- Village
- Location within Bosnia and Herzegovina
- Coordinates: 44°40′40″N 18°13′10″E
- Country: Bosnia and Herzegovina
- Entity: Republika Srpska
- Municipality: Doboj
- Time zone: UTC+1 (CET)
  - Summer (DST): UTC+2 (CEST)

Boljanić (Cyrillic: Бољанић) is a village in the municipality of Doboj, Bosnia and Herzegovina.
