= Kotorsko =

Kotorsko Которско
- Village
- Location within Bosnia and Herzegovina
- Coordinates: 44°50′N 18°04′E
- Country: Bosnia and Herzegovina
- Entity: Republika Srpska
- Municipality: Doboj
- Time zone: UTC+1 (CET)
  - Summer (DST): UTC+2 (CEST)

Kotorsko (Cyrillic: Которско) is a village in the municipality of Doboj, Republika Srpska, Bosnia and Herzegovina.
