= Vranjak, Modriča =

Vranjak Врањак (Serbian)
- Village (Selo)
- Location within Bosnia and Herzegovina
- Coordinates: 44°54′53″N 18°13′37″E
- Country: Bosnia and Herzegovina
- Republic: Republika Srpska
- Municipality: Modriča

Population (1991)
  - Total: 2,370
- Time zone: UTC+1 (CET)
  - Summer (DST): UTC+2 (CEST)

Vranjak (Serbian Cyrillic: Врањак) is a village in the municipality of Modriča, Republika Srpska, Bosnia and Herzegovina.

== See also ==
- FK Vranjak
