= Batkuša =

Batkuša Баткуша (Serbian)
- Village (Selo)
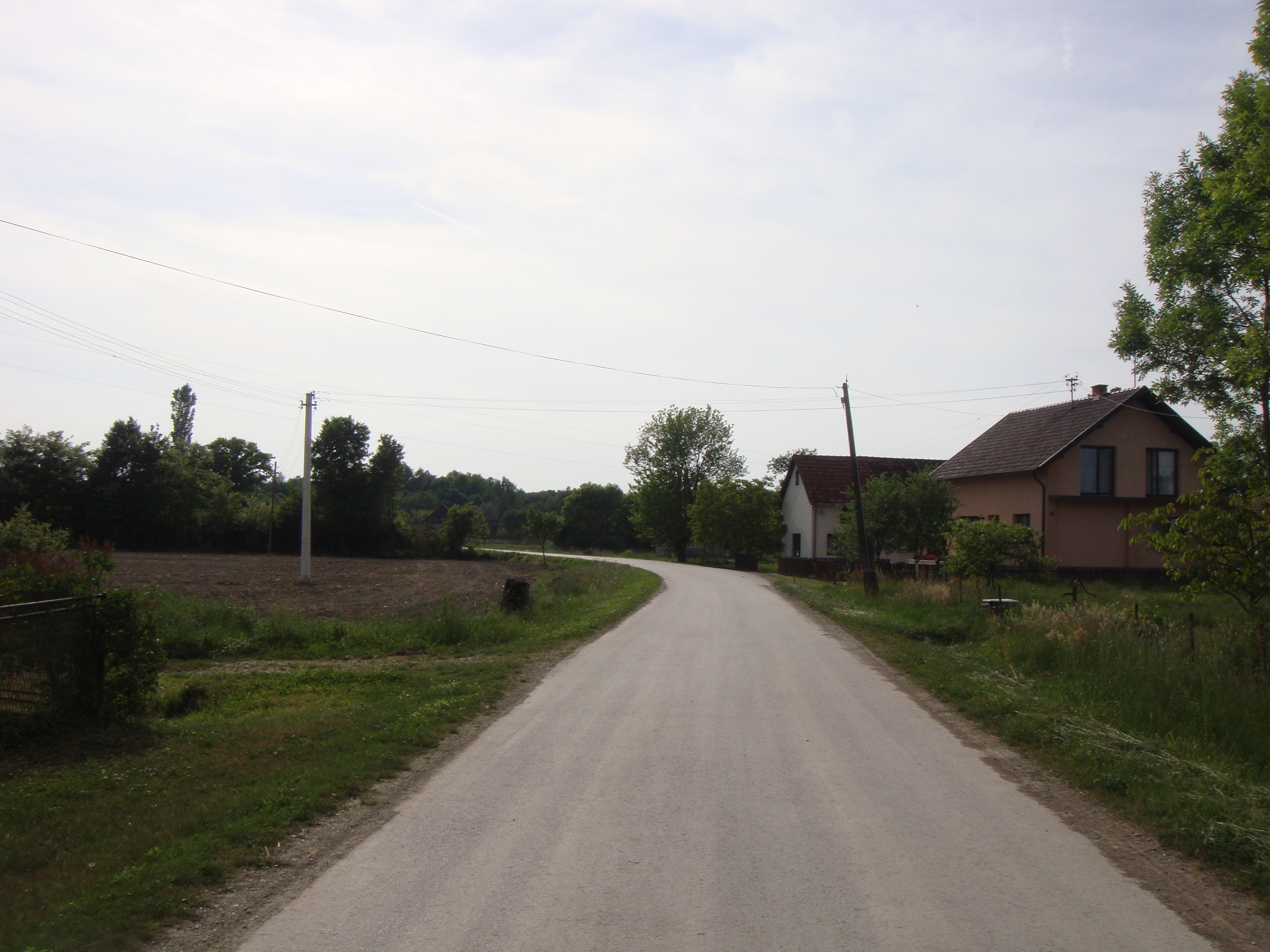

- Location within Bosnia and Herzegovina
- Coordinates: 45°00′00″N 18°33′05″E
- Country: Bosnia and Herzegovina
- Entity: Republika Srpska
- Municipality: Šamac
- Time zone: UTC+1 (CET)
  - Summer (DST): UTC+2 (CEST)

Batkuša (Serbian Cyrillic: Баткуша) is a village in the municipality of Šamac, Bosnia and Herzegovina.
