= Šamac, Bosnia and Herzegovina =

Town and municipality in Republika Srpska, Bosnia and Herzegovina

Šamac Шамац
- Town and municipality
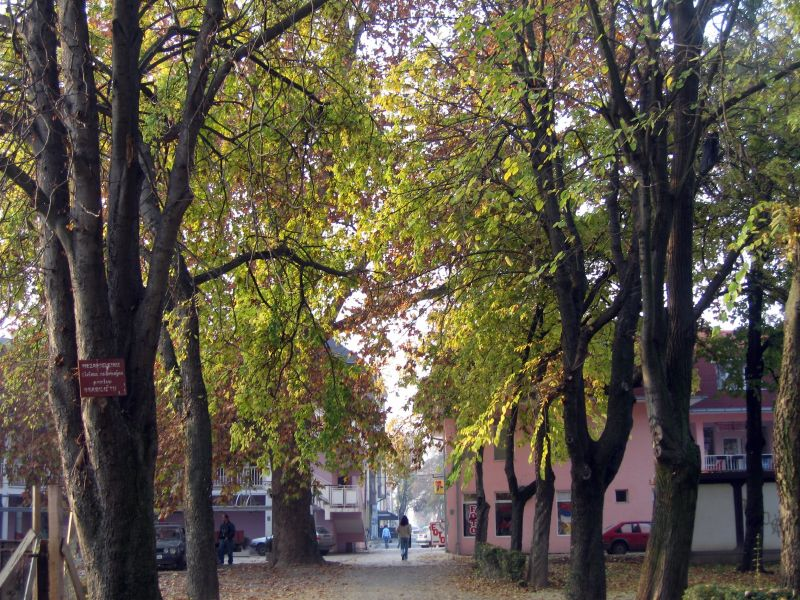
- Šamac

- Location of Šamac within Bosnia and Herzegovina

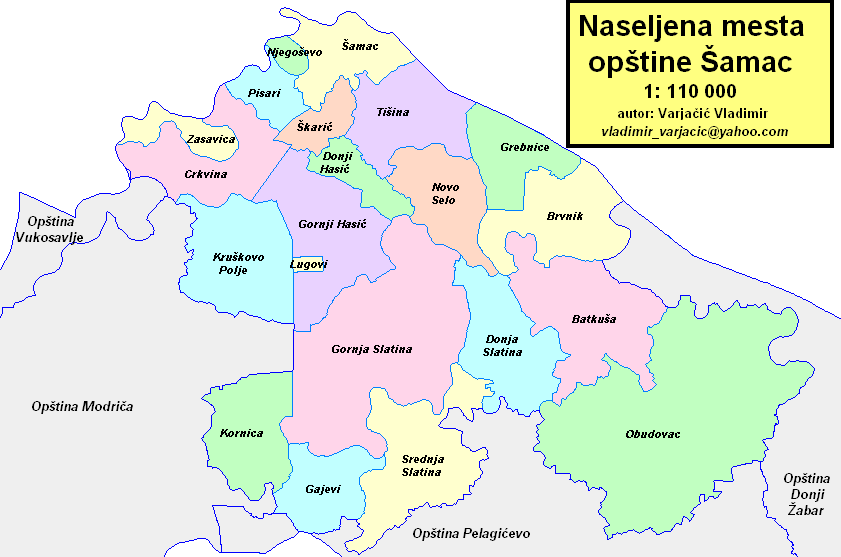

- Location of Šamac within Bosnia and Herzegovina
- Coordinates: 45°03′38″N 18°28′3″E
- Country: Bosnia and Herzegovina
- Entity: Republika Srpska
- Geographical region: Posavina

Government
  - Mayor: Đorđe Milićević (SDS)
  - Municipality: 177.54 km^{2} (68.55 sq mi)

Population (2013 census)
  - Town: 5,390
  - Municipality: 17,273
  - Municipality density: 97.291/km^{2} (251.98/sq mi)
- Time zone: UTC+1 (CET)
  - Summer (DST): UTC+2 (CEST)
- Area code: 54
- Website: www.opstinasamac.org

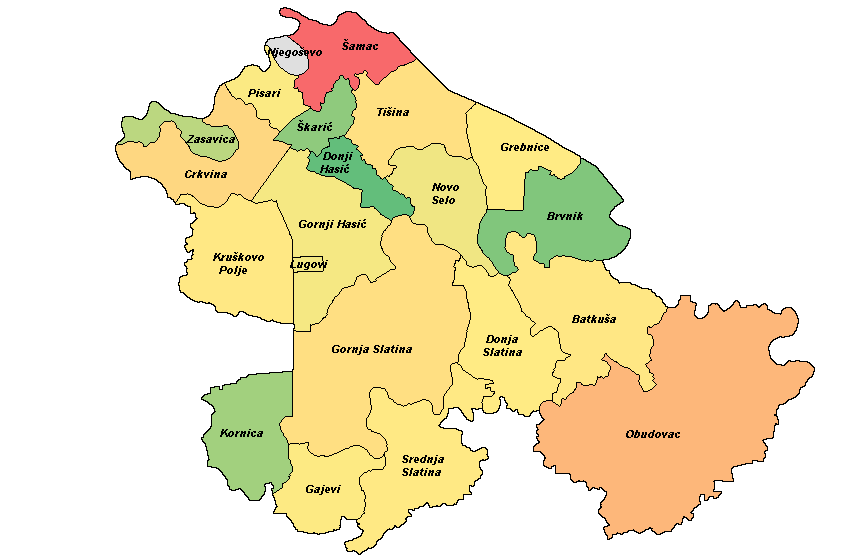
Šamac municipality by population proportional to the settlement with the highest and lowest population

Šamac (Serbian Cyrillic: Шамац, pronounced [ʃâmat͡s]), formerly Bosanski Šamac (Serbian Cyrillic: Босански Шамац), is a town and municipality in Republika Srpska, Bosnia and Herzegovina. Small uninhabited parts of the settlement are also located in the municipalities of Odžak and Domaljevac-Šamac in the Federation of Bosnia and Herzegovina.

As of 2013, the town has a population of 5,390 inhabitants, while the municipality has 17,273 inhabitants. It is situated on the right bank of the Sava river. Across the river is Slavonski Šamac in Croatia.

== History ==
The modern town was founded by Bosnian Muslim refugees expelled from the Sanjak of Smederevo in 1862, after the Principality of Serbia gained autonomy from the Ottoman Empire and during the ethnic conflicts surrounding the Čukur Fountain incident. These refugees came mainly from Užice and Sokol. At the time, Šamac was initially called Gornja Azizija, meaning "Upper Azizija", after Sultan Abdulaziz. It was part of the Vilayet of Bosnia before the area was occupied by Austria-Hungary in 1878 and later annexed in 1908. After World War I, the town became part of the Kingdom of Yugoslavia. From 1929 to 1939, it was part of the Drina Banovina, and from 1939 until 1941 it was part of the Banovina of Croatia. During World War II, Šamac, like the rest of Bosnia and Herzegovina, was occupied by the Nazi-controlled Independent State of Croatia. After 1945, the town was reintegrated within the Socialist Republic of Bosnia and Herzegovina in Tito's Yugoslavia.

In the early stages of the Bosnian War, the town was occupied by Bosnian Serb forces, who established a provisional municipal government. Most Bosniaks and Bosnian Croats were ethnically cleansed between April and November 1992. During the war, a semi-permanent front line was established against Croatian and Bosniak forces towards neighbouring Orašje. In 2003, three Bosnian Serb town leaders at the time of the Yugoslav Wars were sentenced by the ICTY for crimes against humanity.

The town lies in an important strategic position in Republika Srpska, near Brčko. As with most other places under Serb control, Republika Srpska authorities removed the "Bosnian" adjective from the town's official name and changed it to "Šamac". Bosniaks and Bosnian Croats continued to refer to it by its historical name, "Bosanski Šamac" (Serbian Cyrillic: Босански Шамац, pronounced [bǒsanskiː ʃâmat͡s]), causing tension among the inhabitants. A court order had the official name changed to simply Šamac, removing ethnic divisions in its previous names.

== Settlements ==
Aside from the town of Šamac, the municipality includes the following settlements:

- Batkuša
- Brvnik
- Crkvina
- Donja Slatina
- Donji Hasić
- Gajevi
- Gornja Slatina
- Gornji Hasić
- Grebnice
- Kornica
- Kruškovo Polje
- Lugovi
- Novo Selo
- Obudovac
- Pisari
- Srednja Slatina
- Škarić
- Tišina
- Zasavica

== Demographics ==
=== Population ===
Population of settlements – Šamac municipality
No.	Settlement	1948	1953	1961	1971	1981	1991	2013
	Total	37,512	44,269		31,374	32,320	32,960	17,273
1	Batkuša						924	625
2	Brvnik						609	253
3	Crkvina						1,704	1,223
4	Donja Slatina						623	471
5	Donji Hasić						1,029	207
6	Gajevi						626	438
7	Gornja Slatina						1,361	903
8	Gornji Hasić						1,048	427
9	Grebnice							443
10	Kornica						830	302
11	Kruškovo Polje						706	588
12	Lugovi							422
13	Novo Selo						1,095	419
14	Obudovac						3,199	2,421
15	Pisari						608	436
16	Šamac				4,877	5,605	6,239	5,390
17	Škarić						298	273
18	Srednja Slatina						1,277	519
19	Tišina						2,032	890
20	Zasavica						558	339

===Ethnic composition===

Ethnic composition – Šamac town
Group	2013	1991	1981	1971
Total	5,390 (100%)	6,239 (100%)	5,605 (100%)	4,877 (100%)
Serbs	3,449 (67.19%)	1,755 (28.13%)	1,342 (23.94%)	1,500 (30.76%)
Bosniaks	1,253 (24.41%)	2,178 (34.91%)	1,697 (30.28%)	2,163 (44.35%)
Croats	227 (4.42%)	827 (13.26%)	687 (12.26%)	726 (14.89%)
Others	204 (3.97%)	284 (4.55%)	61 (1.08%)	38 (0.77%)
Yugoslavs		1,195 (19.15%)	1,774 (31.65%)	429 (8.79%)
Albanians			22 (0.393%)	3 (0.062%)
Montenegrins			13 (0.232%)	8 (0.164%)
Slovenes			5 (0.089%)	3 (0.062%)
Hungarians			4 (0.071%)	4 (0.082%)
Macedonians				3 (0.062%)

Ethnic composition – Šamac municipality
Group	2013	1991	1981	1971
Total	17,273 (100%)	32,960 (100%)	32,320 (100%)	31,374 (100%)
Serbs	13,256 (76.74%)	13,628 (41.35%)	13,328 (41.24%)	14,230 (45.36%)
Croats	2,426 (14.05%)	14,731 (44.69%)	14,327 (44.33%)	14,336 (45.69%)
Bosniaks	1,265 (7.324%)	2,233 (6.775%)	1,725 (5.337%)	2,192 (6.987%)
Others	326 (1.887%)	613 (1.860%)	262 (0.811%)	88 (0.28%)
Yugoslavs		1,755 (5.32%)	2,601 (8.05%)	481 (1.53%)
Montenegrins			33 (0.10%)	25 (0.08%)
Albanians			27 (0.08%)	8 (0.02%)
Hungarians			7 (0.022%)	4 (0.013%)
Slovenes			6 (0.019%)	6 (0.019%)
Macedonians			4 (0.012%)	4 (0.013%)

== Economy ==
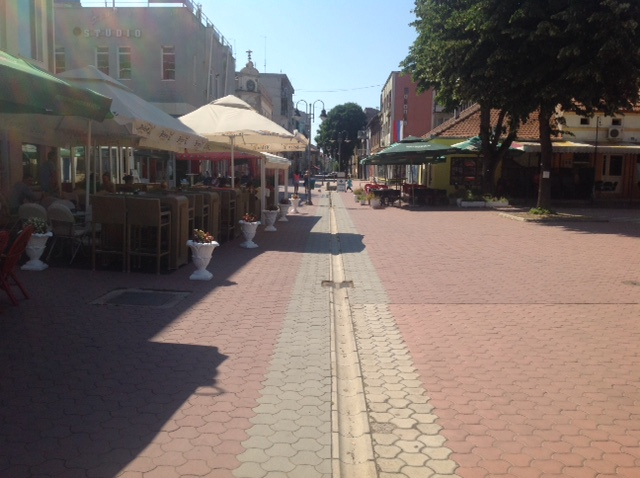
Main square

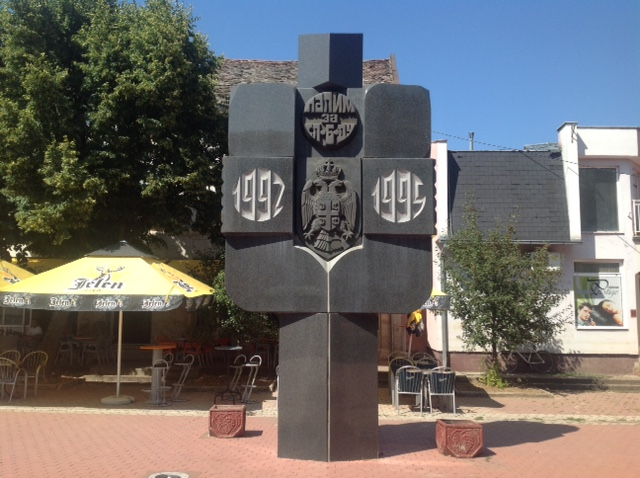
A monument to Serb casualties in the Bosnian War

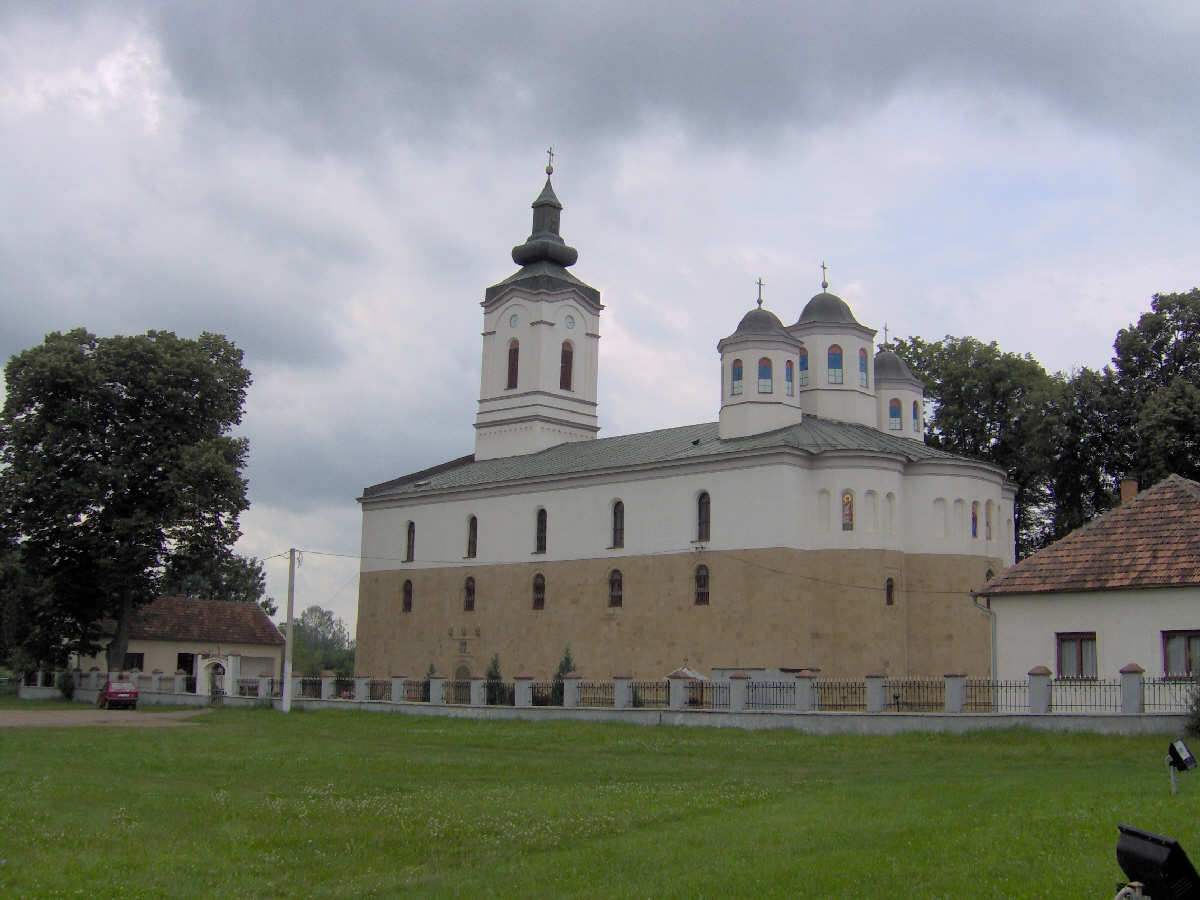
A Serbian Orthodox church in Obudovac

The following table gives a preview of the total number of registered employed people by core activity, as of 2016:

Professional field	Total
Agriculture, forestry and fishing	84
Mining and quarrying	40
Manufacturing	426
Distribution of power, gas, steam and air-conditioning	31
Distribution of water and water waste management	19
Construction	5
Wholesale and retail, repair	417
Transportation and storage	182
Hotels and restaurants	117
Information and communication	6
Finance and insurance	20
Real estate activities	—
Professional, scientific and technical activities	57
Administrative and support services	7
Public administration and defence	176
Education	248
Healthcare and social work	122
Art, entertainment and recreation	8
Other service activities	7
Total	1,972

== Sports ==
The local football club, FK Borac Šamac, plays in the third tier, the Second League of the Republika Srpska.

== Notable people ==
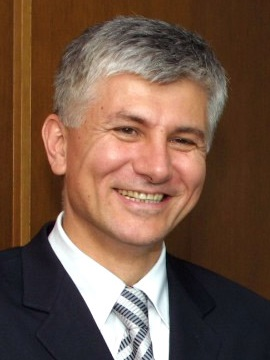
Serbian Prime Minister Zoran Đinđić

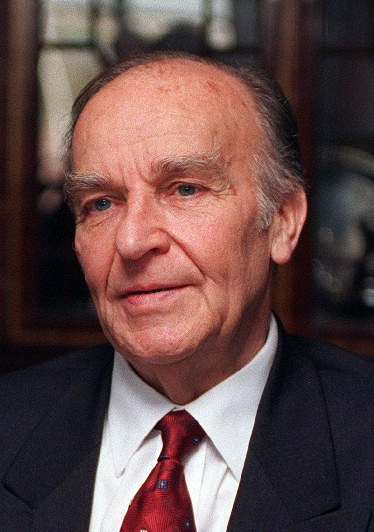
Alija Izetbegović

- Milica Babić-Jovanović (1909–1968), costume designer at the Serbian National Theatre
- Ljubo Miloš (1919–1948), Croatian World War II official and concentration camp commander; executed for war crimes
- Alija Izetbegović (1925–2003), first President of Bosnia and Herzegovina
- Sulejman Tihić (1951–2014), Bosniak member of the Presidency of Bosnia and Herzegovina
- Zoran Đinđić (1952–2003), former Prime Minister of Serbia
- Srebrenko Repčić (born 1954), former footballer
- Predrag Nikolić (born 1960), chess grandmaster
- Stevo Nikolić (born 1984), footballer
- Mario Mandžukić (born 1986), former footballer

== See also ==
- Municipalities of Republika Srpska
- Šamac oil field

== Sources ==
- Official results from the book: Ethnic composition of Bosnia-Herzegovina population, by municipalities and settlements, 1991 census, Zavod za statistiku Bosne i Hercegovine, Bilten no. 234, Sarajevo, 1991.
- Mangold, Max (2005), Das Aussprachewörterbuch, Duden, ISBN 9783411040667
