= FK Vranjak =

- Full name: FK Vranjak
- Founded: 1975
- Ground: Stadion Centar
- Capacity: 500
- Chairman: Jerotije Janković
- Manager: Zoran Mićić
- League: RS 3rd League
Home colours	Away colours

FK Vranjak (Serbian Cyrillic: ФК Bpaњaк) is a football club based in Vranjak, Republika Srpska, Bosnia and Herzegovina.

== History ==
FK Vranjak was founded in 1975, and the first president was Mr. Dimitija Stojanović. Until 1992 the club played mostly in lower leagues of the former Yugoslavia. In 2001 the club qualified for the First League of the Republika Srpska, making this its greatest accomplishment in its history. Afterwards, the club suffered a series of relegations, the season of 2005/06 being especially remembered because the club managed to return to the Second League of the Republika Srpska.

== Stadium ==
The club plays its matches on the new stadium named "Centar" that was built for the beginning of the season 2005/06 for the celebration of the 30 years of existence of the club. Its inauguration was celebrated by the former president of the Football Association of Bosnia and Herzegovina, Mr. Milan Jelić, and the opening match was played against FK Modriča. The stadium had a covered area with 500 seats. All this was archived thanks to the effort of the Vratnjak population and club supporters, the municipality and to a special contribution done from Mr. Niko Vasilić and Mr. Milo Vasilić.
