= Donji Hasić =

Donji Hasić Доњи Хасић (Serbian)
- Village (Selo)
- Location within Bosnia and Herzegovina
- Coordinates: 45°02′N 18°28′E
- Country: Bosnia and Herzegovina
- Entity: Republika Srpska
- Municipality: Šamac
- Time zone: UTC+1 (CET)
  - Summer (DST): UTC+2 (CEST)

Donji Hasić (Serbian Cyrillic: Доњи Хасић) is a village in the municipality of Šamac.
