= Bušletić =

Bušletić Бушлетић
- Village
- Location within Bosnia and Herzegovina
- Coordinates: 44°48′31″N 18°06′24″E
- Country: Bosnia and Herzegovina
- Entity: Republika Srpska
- Municipality: Doboj
- Time zone: UTC+1 (CET)
  - Summer (DST): UTC+2 (CEST)

Bušletić (Cyrillic: Бушлетић) is a village in the municipality of Doboj, Republika Srpska, Bosnia and Herzegovina. The village has both agriculture and industry.
