= Osinja =

Osinja Осиња
- Village
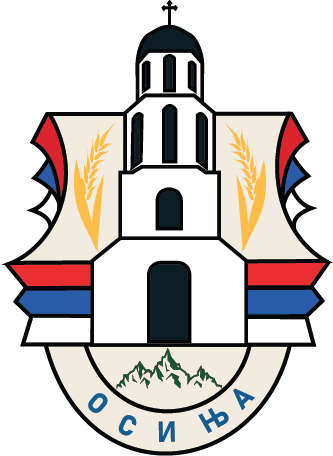
- Osinja's logo

- Location within Bosnia and Herzegovina
- Coordinates: 44°50′20″N 17°52′36″E
- Country: Bosnia and Herzegovina
- Entity: Republika Srpska
- Municipality: Derventa
- Time zone: UTC+1 (CET)
  - Summer (DST): UTC+2 (CEST)
- Postal code: 74412

Osinja (Serbian Cyrillic: Осиња) is a village in the municipality of Derventa, Republika Srpska.

According to the last census (2013), the population of the village was 1407.

== Geography ==
The village of Osinja is situated in a triangle of 3 towns: Derventa, Doboj and Prnjavor. Neighboring villages to Osinja are Pojezna, Crnča, Cerani, Velika Sočanica, Cvrtkovci and Jelanjska. In south of the village is the river Ilova which represents the border of municipalities Derventa and Stanari.

== Economy ==
Many inhabitants are farmers; others work in school, ambulance, post office and in shops and cafes. Many of them also work in the municipality center of Derventa, and many of them are on temporary work abroad. This and other neighboring villages were historically underdeveloped due to distance from towns. The center of the village has a school, post office, ambulance, infirmary, in addition to some shops and cafes. Recently a highway connecting Banja Luka and Doboj was built, and it partially passes Osinja. There are plans to build a highway loop in this village to connect the municipalities of Derventa and Stanari.

== Culture and Religion ==
In this village there is an elementary school with about 300 students. Most of the inhabitants are Orthodox Christians, and there is Serbian orthodox church of St. Panteleimon near center of Osinja.

== Demography ==
In recent decades the population of Osinja has decreased due to economic reasons. Many inhabitants moved to municipality center Derventa, but also to Austria, Germany, Italy, Slovenia and other European countries.

Village Population
Year	Serbs	%	Bosniaks	%	Croats	%	Yugoslavs	%	Others	%	Total
1971	2,009	98,43%	2	0,09%	4	0,19%	19	0,93%	7	0.34%	2,041
1981	2,027	98,25%	1	0,04%	10	0,48%	18	0,87%	7	0.33%	2,063
1991	1,853	98.04%			3	0,15%	30	1,58%	4	0.21%	1,890

== People from Osinja ==
- Dragan Đurić, former president of FK Partizan
- Слободан Ћустић, Serbian actor
