= Kožuhe =

Kožuhe Кожухе
- Village
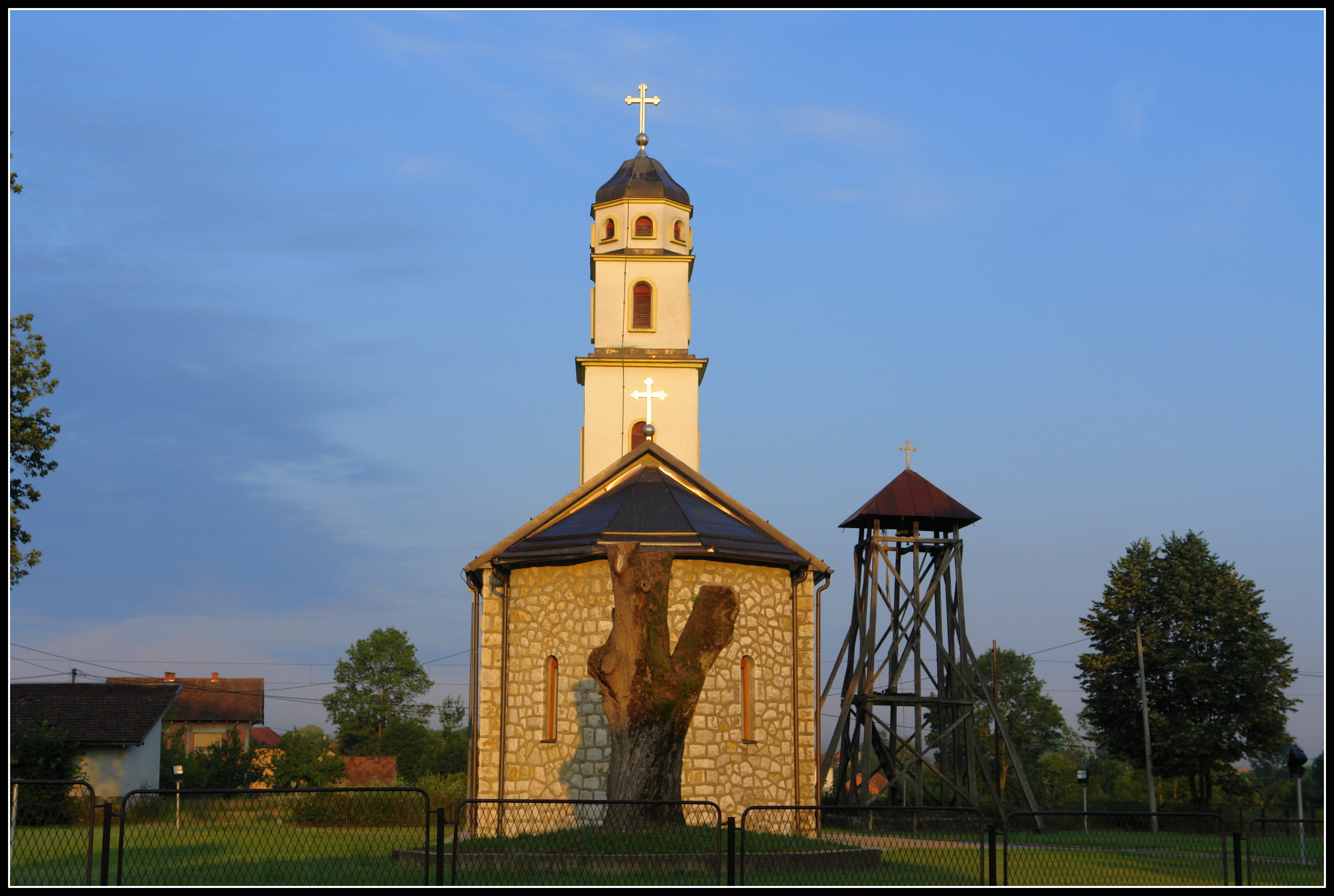

- Location within Bosnia and Herzegovina
- Coordinates: 44°52′N 18°07′E
- Country: Bosnia and Herzegovina
- Entity: Republika Srpska
- Municipality: Doboj
- Time zone: UTC+1 (CET)
  - Summer (DST): UTC+2 (CEST)

Kožuhe (Cyrillic: Кожухе) is a village in the municipality of Doboj, Republika Srpska, Bosnia and Herzegovina. It is first mentioned in the royal charter from 1446, in which Bosnian King Stephen Thomas Kotromanić grants this village along with several others to the Grand Duke Ivaniš Dragišić.
