= Kakmuž =

Kakmuž Какмуж
- Village
- Location within Bosnia and Herzegovina
- Coordinates: 44°38′44″N 18°18′50″E
- Country: Bosnia and Herzegovina
- Entity: Republika Srpska
- Municipality: Petrovo
- Time zone: UTC+1 (CET)
  - Summer (DST): UTC+2 (CEST)

Kakmuž (Cyrillic: Какмуж) is a village in the municipality of Petrovo, Bosnia and Herzegovina.
