= Dugo Polje (Modriča) =

Dugo Polje Дуго Поље (Serbian)
- Village (Selo)
- Location within Bosnia and Herzegovina
- Coordinates: 44°57′34″N 18°09′38″E
- Country: Bosnia and Herzegovina
- Republic: Republika Srpska
- Municipality: Modriča

Population (1991)
  - Total: 1,596
- Time zone: UTC+1 (CET)
  - Summer (DST): UTC+2 (CEST)

Dugo Polje is a village in the municipality of Modriča, Republika Srpska, Bosnia and Herzegovina.
