= Zborište, Brod =

Zborište Збориште
- Village
- Interactive map of Zborište
- Location within Bosnia and Herzegovina
- Coordinates: 45°03′N 18°00′E
- Country: Bosnia and Herzegovina
- Entity: Republika Srpska
- Municipality: Brod
- Time zone: UTC+1 (CET)
  - Summer (DST): UTC+2 (CEST)

Zborište (Serbian: Збориште) is a village in the municipality of Brod, Republika Srpska, Bosnia and Herzegovina.

== See also ==
- Zborište, municipality of Velika Kladuša*
