= Čečava =

- village
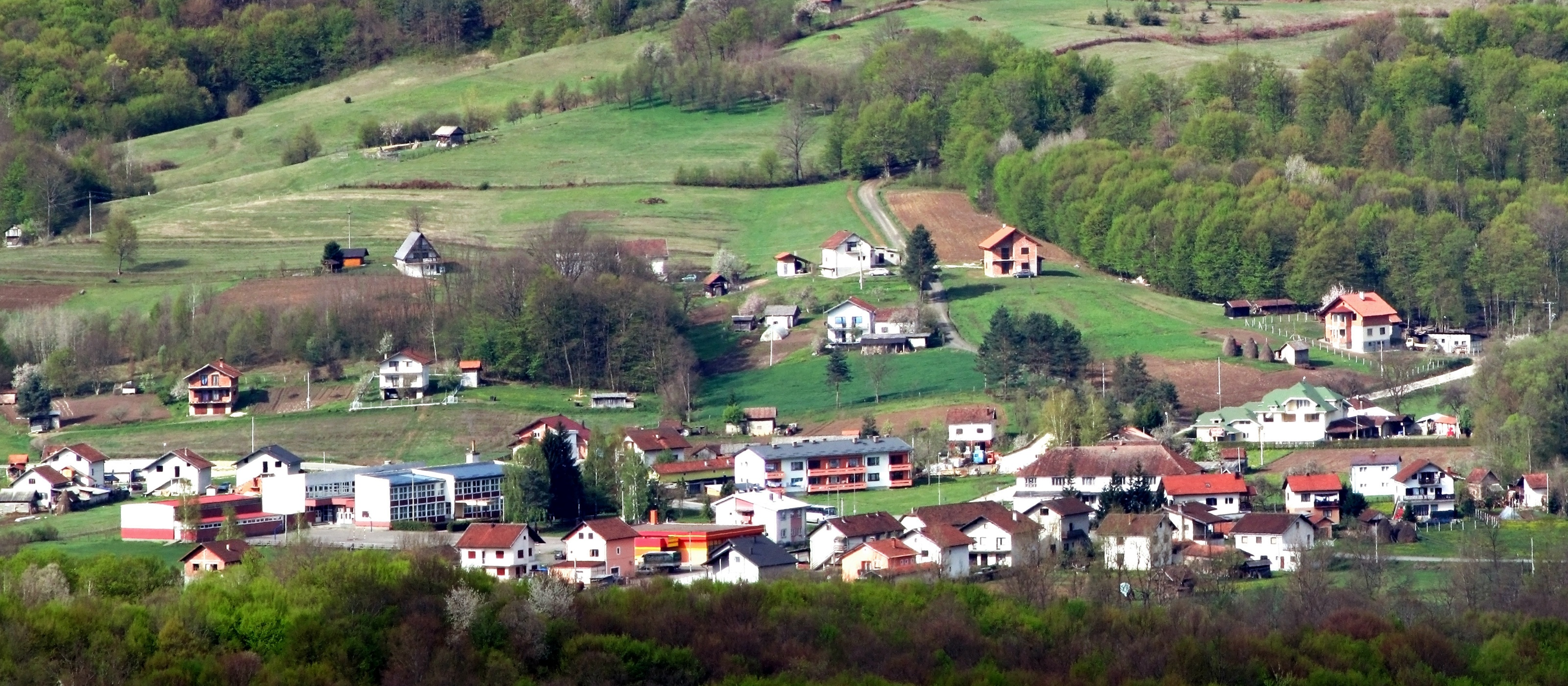

- Location within Bosnia and Herzegovina
- Coordinates: 44.702826°N 17.729187°E
- Country: Bosnia and Herzegovina
- Entity: Republika Srpska
- Municipality: Teslić

Population (2013)
  - Total: 1,653
- Website: www.cecava.org

Čečava (Serbian Cyrillic: Чечава) is a village in the municipality of Teslić, Bosnia and Herzegovina. It is one of the largest Serb villages in the municipality.

== Demographics ==
According to the 2013 census, Čečava has a population of 1,653 inhabitants.

Ethnic compositions
Year	2013	1991	1981	1971
Total	1.653	2.616	3.058	2.865
Serbs	1.632	2.503	2.919	2.794
Croats	9	36	41	33
Muslims		1	1	2
Yugoslavs		54	78	15
Others	12	22	19	21

== Geographic Location ==
Čečava is situated in the northeastern region of Teslić, located on the summit of Javorova Mountain, and spans across the valley of the Mala Ukrina River.

The village spans 7,807 acres (31.59 km^{2}). It is neighbored by the villages of Prnjavor, Gornji Vijačani, and Kulaši. To the northwest, Čečava borders the villages of Rastuša, Ukrinica, Osivica, Gornji Ranković, Donji Ranković, and Pribinić within the municipality of Teslić, as well as Snjegotina Gornja to the west.

The village begins at the 12 km (7.5 mi) junction where the Osivica River meets the M. Ukrina River. From there, the river flows southwest towards the summit of Nedić Brdo Hill, continues up to Tisovac Hill, moves through the Aliji Brezina Kosa mountainside, and finally ends at Miljkovac.

The village extends northwest towards the shallow hills of Rovovi and Mala Hrastovača, with the borders ending at Lipova Glava. From there, the borders turn north to the hill of Bogdanica and pass through the forested area of Krestelovac, emerging at Šabanova Glavica Hill. The borders then continue northwest, crossing Vučicke Bare and the hill of Puskarnica, reaching Grualj Hill. From Grualj, the borderline extends from Kraljičino Brdo to Stupa, then continues to the vineyards (Veliki Vinogradi) and Prokop. The border proceeds from the small hills of Velika and Mala Balabanovića and reaches the trigonometric point 249.

The village continues southeast, reaching the M. Ukrina River. The borders then follow the river and return to their starting point at the 12 km mark (dvanaesti kilometer). The administrative center of the village is located at the point where the M. Ukrina River meets the smaller Chechavica River.

== History and Tradition ==
The village of Čečava was first recorded in a decree by Prince Stjepan and his brother, Vladislav Kotromanić. The decree rewarded supervisor Grgur Stipanović for his loyalty by granting him the annexation of five villages from the territory of Usora to his kingdom. The decree states: "Firstly Čečava, secondly Hrastusa, thirdly Unenovichi Uskrsh,..."

Due to his loyalty, Grgur was chosen as the delegate representative of the Bosnian court to escort Prince Stjepan’s matchmakers from the Hungarian King.

However, it is unknown how Čečava was named. There are no existing documents concerning the civilization of Čečava from this period. This is due to the large migration of Serbs caused by the violent Turkish invasions. It is believed that the residents of the village moved north. Some documents suggest that the residents of Čečava were transferred to what is now known as Slavonija.

In the settlement of Plane, east of Grualj Hill (643 m / 1,780 feet), there is a smaller hill known as "The Hill of the Queen" (Kraljichino Brdo). The northwestern side of the hill is surrounded by woods, indicating that the treetops were cleared for other purposes. Additionally, there is a crossroads of old caravan paths leading in various directions. These paths include the route to Stupa and Osredak (Stupljanski put), the route through Miladić Brdo to Čečava, the Pope's Road (Popovski put) to Kulaši, and the extension to Grualj Hill, leading to Gornji Vijačani and Snjegotina.

According to tradition, villagers and official guests greeted the Queen on that hill many years ago as she entered their land to marry the Bosnian King. Several local legends about "Queen's Hill" (Kraljicino Brdo) suggest that there was a cottage where she would occasionally stay.

There are also legends about markings on hilltops, such as "Glavica," that were significant to the Austrian Empire at that time. There are several hills named "Glavica" in the area. According to local legend, these marks were either bottles with letters inside or rock pillars.

In 1691, monks from the monasteries in Liplje and Stuplje were relocated to the Orahovica Monastery in the Slavonska Požega area. According to tradition, these monks traveled to Čečava through the Komusanska Brda mountains, where they met other monks from the Liplje Monastery who had crossed Snjegotina. They all continued their journey north. Their long journey ended at the Sava River after first crossing the Ukrina River, where they encountered the residents of Čečava. The residents followed the monks and were resettled in Slavonia. There are still villages in the area named "Čečavac" and "Čečavski Vučinjak," which supports this hypothesis of migration. However, some residents of Čečava did not cross the Sava River, as evidenced by individuals with the surname "Čečavac" in the city of Brod. Today, it is disputed whether the residents returned during the 18th century or if other emigrants were settled in Čečava.

There are a few rocky pillars resembling gravestones with strange inscriptions that are not fully understood. One is located in the "Brdjani" area, and the other is in the "Prodanović" graveyard. The one in the "Prodanović" graveyard is part of a circular rock formation that appears to be either a building foundation or an altar.

Additionally, Rastuša Cave may hold many clues about the region.

== See also ==
- Usora (region)
