= Jakeš =

Jakeš Јакеш (Serbian)
- Village (Selo)
- Location within Bosnia and Herzegovina
- Coordinates: 44°59′00″N 18°16′42″E
- Country: Bosnia and Herzegovina
- Republic: Republika Srpska
- Municipality: Vukosavlje

Population (1991)
  - Total: 2,546
- Time zone: UTC+1 (CET)
  - Summer (DST): UTC+2 (CEST)

Jakeš is a village in the municipality of Vukosavlje, Republika Srpska, Bosnia and Herzegovina.
