= Podnovlje =

Podnovlje Подновље
- Village
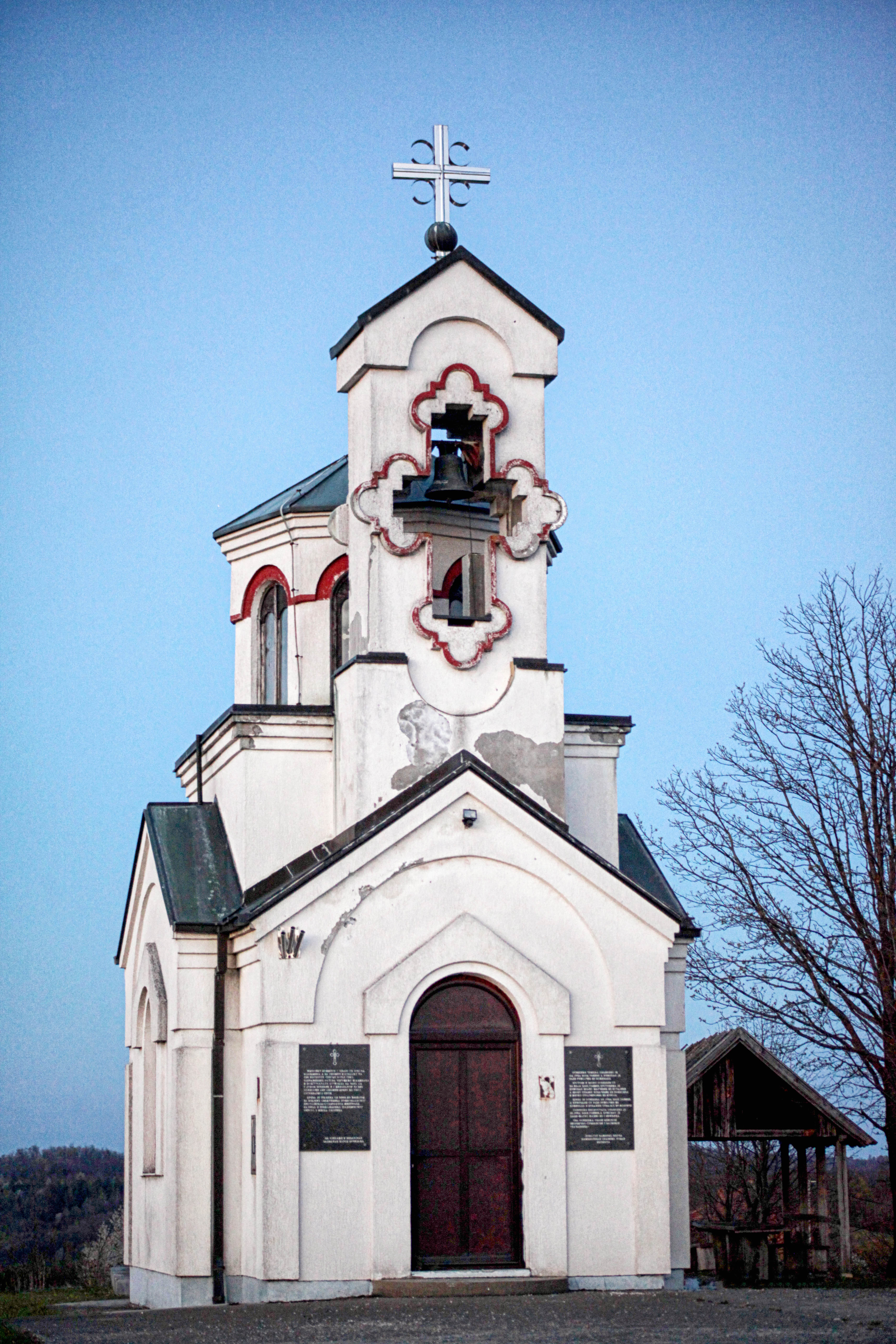
- Church of St. John Vladimir on Lipa, Podnovlje

- Location within Bosnia and Herzegovina
- Coordinates: 44°56′55″N 18°07′14″E
- Country: Bosnia and Herzegovina
- Entity: Republika Srpska
- Municipality: Doboj
- Time zone: UTC+1 (CET)
  - Summer (DST): UTC+2 (CEST)

Podnovlje (Serbian Cyrillic: Подновље) is a village in the municipality of Doboj, Republika Srpska, Bosnia and Herzegovina.
