= List of NK Čelik Zenica managers =

Nogometni klub Čelik Zenica is a professional football club based in Zenica, Bosnia and Herzegovina. This chronological list comprises all those who have held the position of manager of the first team of NK Čelik Zenica from 1945 to the present day, where known. Bojan Regoje is the current manager.

== List of managers ==
- (Socialist Federal Republic of Yugoslavia) Božidar Drenovac (1966–1968)
- (Socialist Federal Republic of Yugoslavia) Dušan Varagić (1968 – July 1969)
- (Socialist Federal Republic of Yugoslavia) Vlatko Konjevod (1969–1970)
- (Socialist Federal Republic of Yugoslavia) Dušan Varagić (July 1970 – 1971)
- (Socialist Federal Republic of Yugoslavia) Midhat Mujkić (1971–1972)
- (Socialist Federal Republic of Yugoslavia) Dušan Varagić (1972–1973)
- (Socialist Federal Republic of Yugoslavia) Dragoljub Milošević (1973–1974)
- (Socialist Federal Republic of Yugoslavia) Marcel Žigante (1974–1975)
- (Socialist Federal Republic of Yugoslavia) Alojz Renić (1975–1977)
- (Socialist Federal Republic of Yugoslavia) Miladin Radičević (1977)
- (Socialist Federal Republic of Yugoslavia) Kemal Šestić (1977)
- (Socialist Federal Republic of Yugoslavia) Milan Ribar (January 1978 – July 1978)
- (Socialist Federal Republic of Yugoslavia) Alojz Renić (1979–1980)
- (Socialist Federal Republic of Yugoslavia) Boris Marović (? – 1981)
- (Socialist Federal Republic of Yugoslavia) Milan Ribar (July 1981 – March 1984)
- (Socialist Federal Republic of Yugoslavia) Džemaludin Mušović (1985–1987)
- (Socialist Federal Republic of Yugoslavia) Josip Skoblar (January 1988 – 1988)
- (Socialist Federal Republic of Yugoslavia) Vukašin Višnjevac (1988)
- (Socialist Federal Republic of Yugoslavia) Marijan Bloudek (1988 – ?)
- (Socialist Federal Republic of Yugoslavia) Miladin Radičević (? – 1989)
- (Socialist Federal Republic of Yugoslavia) Fahrudin Jusufi (June 1989 – ?)
- (Socialist Federal Republic of Yugoslavia) Kemal Hafizović (1989–92)
- (Bosnia and Herzegovina) Nermin Hadžiahmetović (1992–96)
- (Bosnia and Herzegovina) Kemal Hafizović (1996–97)
- (Bosnia and Herzegovina) Jasmin Hajduk (1997)
- (Bosnia and Herzegovina) Josip Katalinski (1998)
- (Bosnia and Herzegovina) Husnija Arapović (1998–99)
- (Bosnia and Herzegovina) Omer Kopić (1999–00)
- (Bosnia and Herzegovina) Nermin Hadžiahmetović (2000–01)
- (Bosnia and Herzegovina) Kemal Hafizović (2001)
- (Bosnia and Herzegovina) Dino Đurbuzović (2001–03)
- (Bosnia and Herzegovina) Irfan Handžić (2003)
- (Bosnia and Herzegovina) Omer Kopić (interim) (2003)
- (Bosnia and Herzegovina) Kemal Hafizović (2003–04)
- (Bosnia and Herzegovina) Husnija Arapović (2004)
- (Bosnia and Herzegovina) Mehmed Čolak (interim) (2004)
- (Bosnia and Herzegovina) Husref Musemić (2004)
- (Bosnia and Herzegovina) Dino Đurbuzović (2004–05)
- (Bosnia and Herzegovina) Esher Hadžiabdić (2005)
- (Bosnia and Herzegovina) Jadranko Bajrić (2005)
- (Bosnia and Herzegovina) Omer Kopić (2005)
- (Brazil) Nelson Mourão (2005)
- (Bosnia and Herzegovina) Esher Hadžiabdić (2006)
- (Bosnia and Herzegovina) Kemal Hafizović (2006)
- (Croatia) Vjeran Simunić (2006)
- (Bosnia and Herzegovina) Boris Gavran (2006–07)
- (Bosnia and Herzegovina) Ivo Ištuk (2007–08)
- (Slovenia) Marijan Bloudek (2008–09)
- (Bosnia and Herzegovina) Ivo Ištuk (2009)
- (Bosnia and Herzegovina) Omer Kopić (2009–10)
- (Bosnia and Herzegovina) Abdulah Ibraković (2010–11)
- (Bosnia and Herzegovina) Boris Gavran (2011)
- (Bosnia and Herzegovina) Elvedin Beganović (interim) (2011)
- (Bosnia and Herzegovina) Elvedin Beganović (2011–12)
- (Bosnia and Herzegovina) Amir Japaur (interim) (2012)
- (Bosnia and Herzegovina) Vlatko Glavaš (2012)
- (Bosnia and Herzegovina) Vlado Jagodić (2012–13)
- (Bosnia and Herzegovina) Nizah Hukić (interim) (2013)
- (Bosnia and Herzegovina) Nizah Hukić (2013–14)
- (Bosnia and Herzegovina) Milomir Odović (2014–15)
- (Croatia) Boris Pavić (2015)
- (Bosnia and Herzegovina) Elvedin Beganović (2015–16)
- (Bosnia and Herzegovina) Kemal Alispahić (2016)
- (Bosnia and Herzegovina) Ivo Ištuk (2016)
- (Bosnia and Herzegovina) Nedim Jusufbegović (2016–17)
- (Croatia) Boris Pavić (2017)
- (Bosnia and Herzegovina) Kemal Hafizović (2017)
- (Bosnia and Herzegovina) Elvedin Beganović (2017)
- (Bosnia and Herzegovina) Vinko Divković (2017)
- (Bosnia and Herzegovina) Slaven Musa (2018)
- (Bosnia and Herzegovina) Edin Prljača (2018)
- (Turkey) Adnan Örnek (2018–2019)
- (Turkey) Cihat Arslan (2019)
- (Turkey) Hasan Özer (2019)
- (Bosnia and Herzegovina) Almir Seferović (interim) (2019)
- (Croatia) Marko Babić (2019)
- (Serbia) Slaviša Božičić (2019)
- (Austria) Igor Jović (interim) (2019)
- (Turkey) Ümit Özat (2019–2020)
- (Bosnia and Herzegovina) Pavle Skočibušić (2020–22)
- (Bosnia and Herzegovina) Armin Duvnjak (2022–2023)
- (Bosnia and Herzegovina) Dario Damjanović (2023–2024)
- (Bosnia and Herzegovina) Dženan Zaimović (2024–2025)
- (Bosnia and Herzegovina) Bojan Regoje (2025–present)
