= 2010–11 Premier League of Bosnia and Herzegovina =

Premijer Liga
- Season: 2010–11
- Champions: Borac; 1st Premier League title 1st Bosnian title
- Relegated: Budućnost; Drina
- Champions League: Borac
- Europa League: Sarajevo; Željezničar (via domestic cup); NK Široki Brijeg
- Matches: 240
- Goals: 599 (2.5 per match)
- Top goalscorer: Ivan Lendrić (16 goals)
- Biggest home win: Željezničar 8–0 Leotar
- Biggest away win: Drina 0–5 Sarajevo
- Highest scoring: Željezničar 8–0 Leotar; Travnik 5–3 Slavija

The 2010–11 Premier League of Bosnia and Herzegovina was the eleventh season since its original establishment and the ninth as a unified country-wide league. It began in August 2010 and ended in May 2011. Željezničar were the defending champions, having won their fourth championship title in the 2009–10 season.

The league was won by Borac Banja Luka; Budućnost Banovići and Drina Zvornik were relegated to the second-level leagues.

== Teams ==
Relegated after last season were 16th-placed FK Modriča and 15th-placed FK Laktaši.

They were replaced by the champions of the two second-level leagues, Budućnost Banovići from the Prva Liga BiH and Drina Zvornik from the Prva Liga RS.

Location of clubs in 2010–11 Premijer Liga

Team	Location	Stadium	Capacity	Manager
Borac	Banja Luka	Banja Luka City Stadium	7,238	Vlado Jagodić
Budućnost	Banovići	Gradski stadion	6,500	Munever Rizvić
Čelik	Zenica	Bilino Polje	15,292	Abdulah Ibraković
Drina	Zvornik	Gradski stadion	3,000	Darko Vojvodić
Leotar	Trebinje	Police Stadium	8,550	Slavko Jović
Olimpik	Sarajevo	Otoka Stadium	5,000	Mehmed Janjoš
Rudar	Prijedor	Gradski stadion (Prijedor)	2,000	Boris Gavran
FK Sarajevo	Sarajevo	Asim Ferhatović Hase Stadium	37,500	Mirza Varešanović
Slavija	Istočno Sarajevo	Gradski SRC Slavija	6,000	Dragan Bjelica
Sloboda	Tuzla	Tušanj Stadium	8,500	Ibrahim Crnkić
NK Široki Brijeg	Široki Brijeg	Pecara Stadium	5,913	Blaž Slišković
NK Travnik	Travnik	Stadion Pirota	5,000	Nedžad Selimović
Velež	Mostar	Vrapčići Stadium	7,000	Milomir Odović
Zrinjski	Mostar	Bijeli Brijeg Stadium	25,000	Slaven Musa
Zvijezda	Gradačac	Banja Ilidža	5,000	Zoran Ćurguz
Željezničar	Sarajevo	Grbavica Stadium	16,000	Amar Osim

== League table ==
Pos	Team	Pld	W	D	L	GF	GA	GD	Pts	Qualification or relegation
1	Borac Banja Luka (C)	30	19	7	4	37	15	+22	64	Qualification to Champions League second qualifying round
2	Sarajevo	30	17	6	7	51	26	+25	57	Qualification to Europa League second qualifying round (Note: Željezničar have won the 2010–11 Bosnian Cup and therefore qualified for the second qualifying round of the 2011–12 UEFA Europa League.)
3	Željezničar	30	17	4	9	50	25	+25	55	Qualification to Europa League second qualifying round
4	Široki Brijeg	30	16	2	12	59	45	+14	50	Qualification to Europa League first qualifying round
5	Olimpic	30	14	6	10	35	33	+2	48	
6	Sloboda Tuzla	30	14	4	12	28	29	−1	46	
7	Zrinjski	30	13	3	14	41	39	+2	42	
8	Zvijezda	30	11	9	10	40	38	+2	42	
9	Rudar Prijedor	30	11	8	11	37	41	−4	41	
10	Čelik	30	11	7	12	30	30	0	40	
11	Slavija	30	11	5	14	44	46	−2	38	
12	Travnik	30	11	4	15	44	43	+1	37	
13	Velež	30	11	3	16	31	43	−12	36	
14	Leotar	30	10	5	15	29	49	−20	35	
15	Budućnost (R)	30	6	7	17	25	44	−19	25	Relegation to Prva Liga FBiH
16	Drina Zvornik (R)	30	7	2	21	18	53	−35	23	Relegation to Prva Liga RS

Source: RSSSF
Rules for classification: 1st points; 2nd goal difference; 3rd goals scored
For deciding champions, qualification to UEFA Europa League and relegation: 1st points; 2nd head-to-head points; 3rd head-to-head goal difference; 4th head-to-head goals scored; 5th head-to-head away goals scored; 6th goal difference; 7th goals scored
(C) Champions; (R) Relegated

== Results ==
Home \ Away	BOR	BUD	ČEL	DRZ	LEO	OLI	RPR	SAR	SLA	SLO	ŠB	TRA	VEL	ZRI	ZVI	ŽEL
Borac Banja Luka		2–1	1–0	1–0	2–2	2–1	0–0	2–0	4–1	2–0	2–3	2–0	1–1	2–0	1–0	1–0
Budućnost	0–1		1–1	1–1	2–1	2–1	1–3	1–2	0–1	0–0	1–0	3–1	0–1	0–3 (Note: This match was suspended after the 22nd minute with the score at 0–0 when Buducnost players attacked the referee. The match was later awarded 0–3 to Zrinjski.)	2–5	1–2
Čelik	0–1	2–1		1–0	3–0	0–1	2–1	2–1	1–0	1–0	0–0	2–0	1–0	2–1	4–1	1–1
Drina Zvornik	0–2	2–0	1–0		2–1	1–3	0–1	0–5	2–1	0–2	0–2	0–1	2–0	1–0	1–2	0–2
Leotar	2–1	1–1	2–1	1–0		0–1	0–0	0–2	2–1	1–3	1–0	1–0	2–1	4–1	3–0	0–1
Olimpic	0–0	1–1	1–0	2–1	1–0		2–0	2–1	0–0	2–2	1–0	5–3	0–1	2–0	1–0	0–2
Rudar Prijedor	0–1	2–1	1–1	1–0	1–1	3–1		1–1	2–2	3–0	2–1	1–1	2–0	2–0	1–3	3–2
Sarajevo	0–1	2–0	1–0	1–1	3–0	3–1	5–1		4–2	3–0	3–0	1–0	1–0	1–0	2–1	0–0
Slavija	0–0	2–3	5–1	0–1	4–0	0–0	3–0	2–1		1–0	1–0	1–1	2–1	3–2	2–0	1–0
Sloboda Tuzla	1–0	1–0	2–0	3–0	1–1	0–1	2–1	0–0	2–1		0–1	2–0	1–0	0–1	2–1	2–0
Široki Brijeg	1–2	2–1	2–2	5–1	3–1	1–3	1–2	2–1	4–1	4–0		2–1	4–1	4–1	3–0	4–1
Travnik	1–2	0–1	0–0	6–0	1–0	1–0	2–1	1–2	5–3	2–0	4–0		5–1	2–1	2–2	2–1
Velež	0–0	2–0	1–0	2–0	0–2	3–0	3–0	1–2	2–1	2–0	2–5	1–0		1–0	1–4	1–3
Zrinjski	0–0	0–0	1–0	3–0	4–0	1–0	1–0	4–2	4–2	1–0	4–3	3–1	2–0		1–2	0–1
Zvijezda	1–0	0–0	1–1	2–1	1–0	2–2	0–0	1–1	2–1	0–1	6–1	2–1	0–0	1–1		0–0
Željezničar	0–1	2–0	2–1	2–0	8–0	3–0	4–2	0–0	2–0	0–1	0–1	3–0	3–2	3–1	2–0	

Source: bihsoccer.com (in Bosnian)
Legend: Blue = home team win; Yellow = draw; Red = away team win.

== Top goalscorers ==
As of 19 May 2011; Source: NFSBiH

Rank	Player	Club	Goals
1	(Croatia) Ivan Lendrić	Zrinjski	16
2	(Bosnia and Herzegovina) Mirza Džafić	Rudar	14
2	(Bosnia and Herzegovina) Damir Tosunović	Zvijezda	14
2	(Bosnia and Herzegovina) Nusmir Fajić	Travnik	14
5	(Croatia) Mateo Roskam	Široki Brijeg	12
6	(Bosnia and Herzegovina) Zajko Zeba	Željezničar	11
6	(Bosnia and Herzegovina) Igor Radovanović	Slavija	11
8	(Brazil) Wagner Santos Lago	Široki Brijeg	10
8	(Bosnia and Herzegovina) Stevo Nikolić	Borac	10
8	(Bosnia and Herzegovina) Ševko Okić	Velež	10

== Champion Squad ==
1.	FK Borac
	Goalkeepers: (Bosnia and Herzegovina) Asmir Avdukić (30/0); Defenders: (Bosnia and Herzegovina) Vule Trivunović (15/1); (Bosnia and Herzegovina) Vukašin Benović (10/0); (Bosnia and Herzegovina) Draško Žarić (10/0); (Serbia) Milan Stupar (22/1); (Bosnia and Herzegovina) Leonid Ćorić (21/0); (North Macedonia) Perica Stančeski (13/1); (Bosnia and Herzegovina) Dragoslav Stakić (14/0); (Bosnia and Herzegovina) Bojan Tetrić (13/0); (Bosnia and Herzegovina) Duško Sakan (11/0); (Bosnia and Herzegovina) Nemanja Damjanović (12/0); Midfielders: (Bosnia and Herzegovina) Branislav Krunić (15/2); (Bosnia and Herzegovina) Darko Maletić (21/6); (Bosnia and Herzegovina) Milan Muminović (10/0); (Bosnia and Herzegovina) Bojan Puzigaća (12/2); (Bosnia and Herzegovina) Aleksandar Petrović (1/0); (Bosnia and Herzegovina) Siniša Dujković (2/0); (Montenegro) Dražen Međedović (13/0); (Serbia) Milan Srećo (10/1); (Bosnia and Herzegovina) Borislav Mikić (24/1); (Bosnia and Herzegovina) Srđan Grahovac (24/1); (Bosnia and Herzegovina) Boris Raspudić (26/1); Forwards: (Serbia) Nemanja Vidaković (14/2); (Serbia) Ljubiša Vukelja (10/2); (Serbia) Duško Stajić (26/3); (Bosnia and Herzegovina) Stevo Nikolić (26/10); (Serbia) Rade Veljović (13/2) . Manager: (Bosnia and Herzegovina) Vlado Jagodić

== Attendances ==
#	Club	Average
1	Sarajevo	4,167
2	Željezničar	3,633
3	Borac	3,180
4	Čelik	1,947
5	Zvijezda	1,833
6	Zrinjski	1,660
7	Rudar	1,407
8	Budućnost	1,127
9	Velež	973
10	Sloboda	880
11	Široki	807
12	Slavija	780
13	Travnik	703
14	Drina	673
15	Leotar	627
16	Olimpik	607
