= 2008–09 Bosnia and Herzegovina Football Cup =

Tournament details
- Country: Bosnia and Herzegovina
- Teams: 32

Final positions
- Champions: Slavija (1st title)
- Runners-up: Sloboda

2008–09 Bosnia and Herzegovina Football Cup was the fourteenth season of the Bosnia and Herzegovina's annual football cup, and a ninth season of the unified competition. The competition started on September 24, 2008, with the First Round and got concluded on May 28, 2009, with the Final.

== First round ==
Thirty-two teams entered in the First Round. The draw was held on September 11 while the matches were played on September 24, 2008.

Team 1	Score	Team 2
Čelik	2–2 (p. 6–7)	Slavija
Borac	1–2	Orašje
Modriča	4–1	Posušje
Sutjeska	2–0	Mladost Doboj-Kakanj
Olimpik	1–0	Iskra
Sloboda	0–0 (p. 4–1)	Sarajevo
Široki Brijeg	9–0	Odžak 102
Zvijezda	1–0	Željezničar
Famos Istočna Ilidža	2–0	Kiseljak
Travnik	1–1 (p. 6–5)	Branitelj Rodoč
Zrinjski	3–2	Kozara Gradiška
Leotar	1–1 (p. 3–5)	Radnik Lipnica
Radnik Bijeljina	2–0	Hajduk Orašje
Mladost Gacko	0–0 (p. 3–4)	GOŠK Gabela
Tomislav	1–1 (p. 6–7)	Drina Zvornik
Velež	2–1	Laktaši

== Second round ==
The draw for the Second Round was conducted on September 23, 2008. The matches were played on October 1 (first legs) and October 8, 2008 (second legs).

Team 1	Agg.	Team 2	1st leg	2nd leg
Drina Zvornik	0–1	Radnik Bijeljina	0–1	0–0
Zvijezda	4–4 (a)	Velež	4–1	0–3
Sloboda	5–2	Famos Istočna Ilidža	3–1	2–1
GOŠK Gabela	2–3	Olimpik	2–1	0–2
Travnik	1–4	Slavija	0–1	1–3
Radnik Lipnica	4–6	Orašje	4–4	0–2
Široki Brijeg	3–2	Modriča	3–0	0–2
Sutjeska	1–3	Zrinjski	0–1	1–2

== Quarterfinals ==
The draw for the Quarterfinals was conducted on October 21, 2008. The matches were played on October 29 (first legs) and November 12, 2008 (second legs).

Team 1	Agg.	Team 2	1st leg	2nd leg
Radnik Bijeljina	1–3	Zrinjski	1–1	0–2
Velež	3–4	Široki Brijeg	1–4	2–0
Slavija	4–2	Olimpik	1–1	3–1
Sloboda	2–0	Orašje	2–0	0–0

== Semifinals ==
The matches were played on March 25 (first legs) and April 15, 2009 (second legs).

Team 1	Agg.	Team 2	1st leg	2nd leg
Široki Brijeg	2–2 (a)	Sloboda	2–1	0–1
Zrinjski	4–4 (a)	Slavija	4–2	0–2

== Final ==
13 May 2009
17:00 CEST

Sloboda	2–0	Slavija
Mikelini 50'; Prodanović 79'	Report

Tušanj Stadium, Tuzla
Attendance: 2,000
Referee: Novo Panić (Doboj)

=== Second leg ===
28 May 2009
17:00 CEST

Slavija	2–0	Sloboda
Todorović 72'; Spalević 89'	Report
Penalties
Spalević (penalty scored); Zimonjić (penalty scored); Kutalia (penalty scored); Stankovič (penalty missed); Arsenijević (penalty scored)	4–3	(penalty scored) Okanović; (penalty scored) Zoletić; (penalty missed) Tosunović; (penalty scored) Kuduzović; (penalty missed) Prodanović

Gradski SRC Slavija Stadium, Istočno Sarajevo
Attendance: 3,500
Referee: Rusmir Mrković (Sarajevo)

Slavija 2–2 Sloboda on aggregate. Slavija won 4–3 on penalties.
