= 2009–10 Premier League of Bosnia and Herzegovina =

Premijer Liga
- Season: 2009–10
- Champions: Željezničar; 3rd Premier League title 4th Bosnian title 5th Domestic title
- Relegated: Laktaši; Modriča
- Champions League: Željezničar
- Europa League: Široki Brijeg; Zrinjski; Borac (via domestic cup)
- Matches: 240
- Goals: 591 (2.46 per match)
- Top goalscorer: Feđa Dudić (16 goals)
- Biggest home win: Široki Brijeg 5-0 Zvijezda; Velež 5–0 Travnik; Zvijezda 5-0 Leotar
- Biggest away win: Slavija 0-4 Sarajevo
- Highest scoring: Travnik 6–5 Modriča

The 2009–10 Premier League of Bosnia and Herzegovina (or just Premijer Liga) was the tenth season since its establishment and the eighth as a unified country-wide league. It began on 1 August 2009 and will end in May 2010. Zrinjski Mostar were the defending champions.

== Team changes to 2008–09 ==
Relegated after last year's season were 16th-placed NK Posušje and 15th-placed HNK Orašje.

They were replaced by the champions of the two second-level leagues, Olimpik Sarajevo (Prva Liga BiH) and Rudar Prijedor (Prva Liga RS).

== Overview ==
=== Teams and stadia ===
Location of clubs in Premijer Liga 2009–10

Team	Location	Stadium	Capacity	Manager
Borac	Banja Luka	City Stadium of Banja Luka	12,000	(Bosnia and Herzegovina) Vlado Jagodić
Čelik	Zenica	Bilino Polje	15,292	(Bosnia and Herzegovina) Omer Kopić
FK Laktaši	Laktaši	Gradski Stadion (Laktaši)	5,000	(Bosnia and Herzegovina) Vlado Jagodić
Leotar	Trebinje	Police Stadium	8,550	(Bosnia and Herzegovina) Borče Sredojevič
FK Modriča	Modriča	Maxima Stadium	6,000	(Bosnia and Herzegovina) Slaviša Božičić
Olimpik	Sarajevo	Otoka Stadium	5,000	(Bosnia and Herzegovina) Vlatko Glavaš
Rudar	Prijedor	Gradski Stadion Prijedor	2,000	(Bosnia and Herzegovina) Mladen Zgonjanin
FK Sarajevo	Sarajevo	Asim Ferhatović Hase Stadium	35,630	(Czech Republic) Jiří Plíšek
Slavija	Sarajevo	Gradski SRC Slavija Stadium	6,000	(Bosnia and Herzegovina) Milomir Odović
Sloboda	Tuzla	Tušanj Stadium	8,500	(Bosnia and Herzegovina) Nermin Hadžiahmetović
NK Široki Brijeg	Široki Brijeg	Pecara Stadium	5,913	(Bosnia and Herzegovina) Toni Karačić
NK Travnik	Travnik	Stadion Pirota	5,000	(Bosnia and Herzegovina) Osman Bajrić
Velež	Mostar	Vrapčići Stadium	7,000	(Bosnia and Herzegovina) Abdullah Ibraković
Zrinjski	Mostar	Bijeli Brijeg Stadium	25,000	(Bosnia and Herzegovina) Dragan Jović
Zvijezda	Gradačac	Banja Ilidža	5,000	(Bosnia and Herzegovina) Zoran Ćurguz
Željezničar	Sarajevo	Grbavica Stadium	12,000	(Bosnia and Herzegovina) Amar Osim

=== Managerial changes ===
Team	Outgoing manager	Manner of departure	Date of vacancy	Incoming manager	Date of appointment
Olimpik	Husref Musemić			Vlatko Glavaš	
Čelik	Ivo Ištuk			Omer Kopić	
Široki Brijeg	Ivica Barbarić			Toni Karačić	
Leotar	Srdjan Bajić			Borče Sredojević	
Sloboda	Adnan Osmanhodžić			Nermin Hadžiahmetović	
Slavija	Zoran Erbez			Milomir Odović	

== League table ==
Pos	Team	Pld	W	D	L	GF	GA	GD	Pts	Qualification or relegation
1	Željezničar (C)	30	18	7	5	52	22	+30	61	Qualification to Champions League second qualifying round
2	Široki Brijeg	30	16	7	7	46	27	+19	55	Qualification to Europa League first qualifying round
3	Borac Banja Luka	30	17	2	11	37	29	+8	53	Qualification to Europa League second qualifying round (Note: Borac Banja Luka were the winners of the 2009–10 Bosnian Cup competition and qualified for the second qualifying round of the UEFA Europa League.)
4	Zrinjski	30	15	6	9	46	33	+13	51	Qualification to Europa League first qualifying round
5	Sarajevo	30	14	8	8	43	25	+18	50	
6	Olimpic	30	12	8	10	30	34	−4	44	
7	Velež	30	13	4	13	42	33	+9	43	
8	Sloboda Tuzla	30	13	3	14	30	34	−4	42	
9	Travnik	30	11	6	13	40	41	−1	39	
10	Rudar Prijedor	30	11	5	14	27	32	−5	38	
11	Leotar	30	11	5	14	32	48	−16	38	
12	Zvijezda	30	11	4	15	35	47	−12	37	
13	Čelik	30	10	5	15	33	36	−3	35	
14	Slavija	30	10	5	15	32	45	−13	35	
15	Laktaši (R)	30	10	4	16	37	46	−9	34	Relegation to Prva Liga RS
16	Modriča (R)	30	7	3	20	27	57	−30	24	Relegation to Prva Liga RS

Source: sportsport.ba
Rules for classification: 1st points; 2nd goal difference; 3rd goals scored
For deciding champions, qualification to UEFA Europa League and relegation: 1st points; 2nd head-to-head points; 3rd head-to-head goal difference; 4th head-to-head goals scored; 5th head-to-head away goals scored; 6th goal difference; 7th goals scored
(C) Champions; (R) Relegated

== Results ==
Home \ Away	BOR	ČEL	LAK	LEO	MOD	OLI	RPR	SAR	SLA	SLO	ŠB	TRA	VEL	ZRI	ZVI	ŽEL
Borac Banja Luka		2–1	1–0	2–0	4–0	0–2	1–0	0–1	3–1	1–0	3–2	1–0	2–0	3–0	2–0	2–0
Čelik	0–1		2–1	0–1	1–0	1–2	3–0	0–0	3–1	2–1	0–0	2–1	2–1	4–1	4–2	0–1
Laktaši	0–2	2–0		0–1	1–1	4–0	2–0	2–1	4–1	2–0	1–2	0–0	3–1	0–1	1–0	0–1
Leotar	2–1	2–1	3–1		3–1	0–0	1–0	1–0	2–1	1–0	0–1	2–0	0–1	2–3	1–1	3–3
Modriča	1–0	0–1	0–2	2–1		0–1	1–2	3–0	2–0	0–4	2–4	0–2	1–1	1–2	0–1	2–1
Olimpic	1–2	0–0	0–0	1–0	2–2		3–1	1–1	3–0	1–0	0–1	1–0	1–0	1–0	1–0	0–2
Rudar Prijedor	1–0	1–1	2–0	0–0	1–0	3–1		2–2	1–0	1–0	1–1	2–0	2–0	2–0	3–0	0–2
Sarajevo	3–0	3–1	3–1	3–0	2–0	2–1	3–0		2–0	1–1	1–1	2–1	1–1	3–0	1–0	0–0
Slavija	0–1	1–0	3–1	2–0	4–1	0–0	2–0	0–4		2–1	3–2	1–1	2–0	0–2	2–0	1–1
Sloboda Tuzla	2–0	2–1	2–4	1–0	1–2	0–0	1–0	1–0	1–0		1–0	2–1	2–0	2–0	1–0	1–0
Široki Brijeg	0–0	2–1	3–0	4–1	2–0	2–2	1–0	2–0	0–0	2–0		1–0	2–0	2–1	5–0	0–2
Travnik	2–0	2–1	2–2	2–2	6–5	1–0	1–0	1–0	3–0	4–0	1–2		2–1	3–3	4–1	0–0
Velež	2–0	0–0	4–1	6–2	1–0	4–1	1–0	1–0	4–2	1–0	1–0	5–0		0–0	4–0	0–2
Zrinjski	3–0	2–0	2–1	3–0	4–0	3–0	3–1	1–1	0–0	2–0	4–1	2–0	2–1		0–1	1–1
Zvijezda	1–1	1–0	4–1	5–0	0–1	3–4	1–0	2–1	2–3	2–2	1–1	1–0	2–1	2–0		2–1
Željezničar	4–2	4–1	4–1	3–1	3–0	2–0	1–1	1–2	2–0	4–1	1–0	2–0	1–0	1–1	2–0	

Source: bihsoccer.com (in Bosnian)
Legend: Blue = home team win; Yellow = draw; Red = away team win.

== Top goalscorers ==
Source: nfsbih.ba

Rank	Player	Club	Goals
1	(Bosnia and Herzegovina) Feđa Dudić	Travnik	16
2	(Bosnia and Herzegovina) Samir Bekrić	Željezničar	15
3	(Argentina) Juan Manuel Varea	Široki Brijeg	14
4	(Bosnia and Herzegovina) Alen Škoro	Sarajevo	13
4	(Bosnia and Herzegovina) Adin Džafić	Velež	13
6	(Bosnia and Herzegovina) Krešimir Kordić	Zrinjski	10
6	(Bosnia and Herzegovina) Alen Mešanović	Željezničar	10
6	(Bosnia and Herzegovina) Elvir Čolić	Velež	10

== Attendances ==
#	Club	Average
1	Željezničar	7,733
2	Borac	6,433
3	Sarajevo	3,133
4	Rudar	2,620
5	Čelik	2,490
6	Zrinjski	2,233
7	Velež	2,227
8	Zvijezda	2,153
9	Sloboda	1,747
10	Široki	1,513
11	Travnik	947
12	Leotar	790
13	Modriča	740
14	Laktaši	733
15	Slavija	693
16	Olimpik	657
