= 2006–07 Bosnia and Herzegovina Football Cup =

Tournament details
- Country: Bosnia and Herzegovina
- Teams: 32

Final positions
- Champions: Široki Brijeg; 1st national cup title
- Runners-up: Slavija

2006–07 Bosnia and Herzegovina Football Cup was the thirteenth season of the Bosnia and Herzegovina's annual football cup, and a seventh season of the unified competition. The competition started on 20 September 2006 with the First Round and concluded on 26 May 2007 with the Final.

== First round ==
Thirty-two teams entered in the First Round. The matches were played on 20 and 21 September 2006.

Team 1	Score	Team 2
Borac Banja Luka	3–2	Zrinjski
Leotar	5–0	Sloboda Tuzla
Radnik Bijeljina	1–3	Posušje
Čelik Zenica	2–1	Jedinstvo Bihać
Široki Brijeg	4–0	Žepče
Velež	w/o	Rudar Prijedor
Slavija	3–1	TOŠK Tešanj
Kozara Gradiška	0–2	Željezničar
Drina Zvornik	1–2	Sarajevo
Modriča Maxima	4–0	Tomislav
Zvijezda	10–0	Sloga Bosanska Krupa
Orašje	4–1	Odžak 102
Branitelj Rodoč	2–5	BSK Nektar Banja Luka
Goražde	2–2 (6–5 p)	Kreševo-Stanić
Mrkaljević Čelić	3–0	Bosna Visoko
Famos Vojkovići	1–1 (5–6 p)	Ljubić Prnjavor

== Second round ==
The 16 winners from the prior round enter this round. The first legs were played on 17 and 18 October and the second legs were played on 25 October 2006.

Team 1	Agg.	Team 2	1st leg	2nd leg
Modriča Maxima	5–2	Leotar	2–0	3–2
Posušje	3–6	Sarajevo	3–3	0–3
Velež	2–3	Široki Brijeg	2–2	0–1
Slavija	5–1	Orašje	3–0	2–1
Željezničar	2–2	Zvijezda	1–0	1–2
BSK Nektar Banja Luka	1–3	Borac Banja Luka	0–2	1–1
Ljubić Prnjavor	1–2	Čelik Zenica	1–0	0–2
Goražde	3–3 (4–1 p)	Mrkaljević Čelić	2–1	1–2

== Quarterfinals ==
The eight winners from the prior round enter this round. The first legs were played on 8 and 15 November and the second legs were played on 22 November 2006.

Team 1	Agg.	Team 2	1st leg	2nd leg
Željezničar	2–3	Sarajevo	0–0	2–3
Čelik Zenica	3–0	Borac Banja Luka	2–0	1–0
Široki Brijeg	2–2 (5–3 p)	Modriča Maxima	2–0	0–2
Slavija	5–3	Mrkaljević Čelić	4–0	1–3

== Semifinals ==
The four winners from the prior round enter this round. The first legs will be played on 11 April and the second legs were played on 25 April 2007.

Team 1	Agg.	Team 2	1st leg	2nd leg
Sarajevo	2–3	Slavija	1–1	1–2
Čelik Zenica	2–2 (4–5 p)	Široki Brijeg	2–0	0–2

== Final ==
=== First leg ===
9 May 2007
17:00 CEST

Široki Brijeg	1–1	Slavija
Celson 23'	Report	Simić 5'

Stadion Pecara, Široki Brijeg
Attendance: 1,500
Referee: Jovo Radić (Šamac)

=== Second leg ===
26 May 2007
17:00 CEST

Slavija	0–1	Široki Brijeg
	Report	Kovačić 68'

Gradski SRC Slavija, Istočno Sarajevo
Attendance: 2,000
Referee: Mirko Buljan (Mostar)

Široki Brijeg won 2–1 on aggregate.

== See also ==
- 2006–07 Premier League of Bosnia and Herzegovina
