= Darko Spalević =

Serbian footballer

Personal information
- Full name: Darko Spalević
- Date of birth: 24 March 1977 (age 49)
- Place of birth: Vučitrn, SFR Yugoslavia
- Height: 1.85 m (6 ft 1 in)
- Position: Striker

Senior career*
Years	Team	Apps	(Gls)
1996–1998	Trepča	33	(8)
1998–1999	Priština	10	(0)
1999	Bane	10	(2)
2000–2001	Milicionar	45	(6)
2001–2002	Red Star Belgrade	11	(0)
2003	Cherno More Varna	13	(7)
2003–2004	Lokomotiv Plovdiv	10	(4)
2004	Dynamo Makhachkala	15	(2)
2005	Zalaegerszeg	11	(0)
2006	Henan Jianye	9	(0)
2007–2009	Slavija Sarajevo	66	(44)
2009	Olimpik	13	(5)
2010	Slavija Sarajevo	13	(4)
2010–2014	Radnički Kragujevac	105	(53)
2014–2015	Donji Srem	22	(5)
2015–2016	Slavija Sarajevo	25	(9)
2016–2018	Radnički Kragujevac	27	(8)
2021	Kragujevac		
Total		438	(157)

International career
1999	FR Yugoslavia U23	1	(0)
- * Club domestic league appearances and goals as of 25 July 2021

Darko Spalević (Serbian Cyrillic: Дарко Спалевић; born 24 March 1977) is a Serbian professional footballer who plays as a striker.

Over the course of his journeyman career, Spalević scored over 150 competitive goals in six countries, having his most prolific seasons after the age of thirty.

== Club career ==
Born in Vučitrn, Spalević started out at Trepča, before transferring to Priština in 1998. He stayed there for only one season. After a short stint at Bane in the fall of 1999, Spalević moved to Milicionar, spending there the following year and a half.

In the summer of 2001, Spalević joined Red Star Belgrade. He failed to make an impact at the club in a year and a half, before switching to Bulgarian club Cherno More Varna. In the summer of 2003, Spalević moved to another Bulgarian club Lokomotiv Plovdiv. He won the national championship title in the 2003–04 season.

In the following three seasons, Spalević played for Russian club Dynamo Makhachkala (2004), Hungarian club Zalaegerszeg (2005), and Chinese club Henan Jianye (2006), but without notable achievements.

In early 2007, Spalević moved to Bosnia and Herzegovina and signed with Slavija Sarajevo. He spent the next two and a half years there, becoming the Premier League top scorer in 2008, and 2009. Spalević also helped the club win the Bosnia and Herzegovina Cup in the 2008–09 campaign. He subsequently switched to Olimpik, before returning to Slavija in early 2010.

In July 2010, Spalević returned to Serbia and joined First League club Radnički Kragujevac. He was their top scorer in the 2010–11 season with 19 league goals, thus leading them to promotion to the SuperLiga. In the following 2011–12 season, Spalević became the SuperLiga top scorer with 19 goals. He stayed at the club for two more years, despite having some disagreements with the club's president, helping the side remain in the top flight.

After leaving Radnički, Spalević moved to fellow SuperLiga club Donji Srem in June 2014, penning a one-year contract. He however failed to help them avoid relegation from the top flight in the 2014–15 season. In July 2015, Spalević officially returned to his former club Slavija Sarajevo on a one-year deal.

In July 2016, Spalević returned to Radnički Kragujevac. He helped the side win the Serbian League West in his comeback season, thus earning promotion back to the Serbian First League.

== International career ==
In December 1999, Spalević played for the FR Yugoslavia U23s in a 0–1 friendly loss against Argentina.

== Career statistics ==
Club	Season	League	
Club	Season	Apps	Goals
Zalaegerszeg	2005–06	11	0
Slavija Sarajevo	2006–07	14	9
Slavija Sarajevo	2007–08	27	18
Slavija Sarajevo	2008–09	25	17
Olimpik	2009–10	13	5
Slavija Sarajevo	2009–10	13	4
Radnički Kragujevac	2010–11	28	19
Radnički Kragujevac	2011–12	26	19
Radnički Kragujevac	2012–13	25	7
Radnički Kragujevac	2013–14	26	8
Donji Srem	2014–15	22	5
Slavija Sarajevo	2015–16	25	9
Radnički Kragujevac	2016–17	25	8
Radnički Kragujevac	2017–18	2	0
Career total		282	128

== Honours ==
=== Player ===
Lokomotiv Plovdiv

- Bulgarian A Group: 2003–04

Slavija Sarajevo

- Bosnian Cup: 2008–09

Radnički Kragujevac

- Serbian League West: 2016–17

Individual

- Serbian SuperLiga Team of the Season: 2011–12
- Bosnian Premier League top scorer: 2007–08, 2008–09
- Serbian First League top scorer: 2010–11
- Serbian SuperLiga top scorer: 2011–12
