= 2005–06 Bosnia and Herzegovina Football Cup =

Tournament details
- Country: Bosnia and Herzegovina
- Teams: 32

Final positions
- Champions: Orašje (1st title)
- Runners-up: Široki Brijeg

2005–06 Bosnia and Herzegovina Football Cup was the twelfth season of the Bosnia and Herzegovina's annual football cup, and a sixth season of the unified competition. The competition started on 21 September 2005 with the first round and concluded on 3 May 2006 with the final.

== First round ==
Thirty-two teams entered in the first round. The matches were played on 21 September, 4 and 11 October 2005.

Team 1	Score	Team 2
Sarajevo	2–0	Leotar
Slavija	4–4 (4–3 p)	Jedinstvo Bihać
Čelik Zenica	0–1	SAŠK Napredak
Orašje	3–1	Velež
Zrinjski	5–0	Kozara Gradiška
Borac Banja Luka	4–0	Travnik
Sloga Doboj	0–2	Modriča Maxima
Budućnost Banovići	2–0	Bosna Kalesija
Radnik Bijeljina	2–3	Igman Konjic
Žepče Limorad	7–0	Tuzla
Rudar Ugljevik	1–0	Ljubić Prnjavor
Rudar Kakanj	3–1	Vogošća
MIS Kreševo	3–0	Tomislav
Sloboda Tuzla	0–1	Željezničar
Odžak 102	0–3	Široki Brijeg
Posušje	3–0	Jedinstvo Brčko

== Second round ==
The 16 winners from the prior round enter this round. The first legs were played on 19 October and the second legs were played on 26 October 2005.

Team 1	Agg.	Team 2	1st leg	2nd leg
Zrinjski	3–3 (a)	Modriča Maxima	3–1	0–2
Orašje	2–1	Budućnost Banovići	2–1	0–0
Posušje	0–1	Žepče Limorad	0–0	0–1
Sarajevo	7–1	Borac Banja Luka	4–0	3–1
Željezničar	2–1	Rudar Ugljevik	2–0	0–1
Široki Brijeg	2–1	Rudar Kakanj	2–0	0–1
SAŠK Napredak	0–5	Slavija	0–1	0–4
MIS Kreševo	3–1	Igman Konjic	3–0	0–1

== Quarterfinals ==
The eight winners from the prior round enter this round. The first legs were played on 9 November and the second legs were played on 16 November 2005.

Team 1	Agg.	Team 2	1st leg	2nd leg
Sarajevo	1–4	Željezničar	1–1	0–3 (f)
Modriča Maxima	1–6	Orašje	0–5	1–1
Široki Brijeg	5–1	Slavija	4–0	1–1
Žepče Limorad	3–2	MIS Kreševo	1–0	2–2

== Semifinals ==
The four winners from the prior round enter this round. The first legs will be played on 29 March and the second legs were played on 12 April 2006.

Team 1	Agg.	Team 2	1st leg	2nd leg
Željezničar	1–2	Široki Brijeg	1–0	0–2
Orašje	3–2	Žepče Limorad	2–1	1–1

== Final ==
=== First leg ===
19 April 2006
16:00 CEST

Široki Brijeg	0–0	Orašje
	Report

Stadion Pecara, Široki Brijeg
Attendance: 2,000
Referee: Novo Panić (Doboj)

=== Second leg ===
3 May 2006
16:00 CEST

Orašje	3–0	Široki Brijeg
Pejić 54', 90+3'; Kobas 79'	Report

Gradski stadion Goal, Orašje
Attendance: 3,000
Referee: Mevludin Efendić (Sarajevo)

Orašje won 3–0 on aggregate.

== See also ==
- 2005–06 Premier League of Bosnia and Herzegovina
