= Zoran Erbez =

Bosnian football manager (born 1971)

Personal information
- Date of birth: 15 September 1971 (age 55)
- Place of birth: Kalinovik, SFR Yugoslavia

Managerial career
- Years: Team
- 2008–2009: Slavija Sarajevo
- 2011–2012: Slavija Sarajevo
- 2011–2021: Bosnia and Herzegovina U15
- 2020–2021: Slavija Sarajevo

Zoran Erbez (born 15 September 1971) is a Bosnian professional football manager. He is one of the most notable Slavija Sarajevo managers ever, winning the Bosnian Cup and finishing in second place in the 2008–09 season.

== Managerial career ==
=== Slavija Sarajevo ===
Erbez started out his managerial career when he was named an assistant manager of Slavija Sarajevo. In April 2008, he was promoted to the position of manager of Slavija. With Slavija, he won the club's historic Bosnian Cup title in the 2008–09 season. As the club's manager, Erbez also finished as a runner-up in the 2008–09 Bosnian Premier League season. On 20 September 2009, after a loss against Borac Banja Luka, he resigned as manager after a poor start to the 2009–10 season.

On 23 September 2011, two years after leaving Slavija, Erbez was once again named as the new manager of Slavija, but only four months later, on 1 January 2012, he left the club.

=== Bosnia and Herzegovina youth teams ===
On 29 June 2011, Erbez became the new head coach of the Bosnia and Herzegovina U15 national team where he has been holding the position ever since. He led the team in a couple of UEFA Euro U17 qualifications alongside coach Sakib Malkočević, but was unsuccessful.

=== Return to Slavija ===
On 2 July 2020, it was announced that Erbez would once again become the manager of Slavija, but also staying as the under-15 national team head coach.

== Honours ==
=== Manager ===
Slavija Sarajevo

- Bosnian Cup: 2008–09
