= Milan Srećo =

Serbian footballer

Personal information
- Full name: Milan Srećo
- Date of birth: 30 January 1984 (age 42)
- Place of birth: Banja Luka, SFR Yugoslavia
- Height: 1.76 m (5 ft 9 1/2 in)
- Position: Midfielder

Youth career
- Partizan

Senior career*
Years	Team	Apps	(Gls)
2002–2006	Partizan	1	(0)
2003	→ Radnički Klupci (loan)	12	(1)
2003–2004	→ Teleoptik (loan)	27	(11)
2004	→ Borac Banja Luka (loan)	12	(2)
2005	→ Teleoptik (loan)	11	(1)
2005–2006	→ Slavija Sarajevo (loan)	17	(3)
2007	Grbalj	10	(0)
2007–2008	Mladenovac	14	(0)
2008	→ Zemun (loan)	12	(0)
2008–2009	Banat Zrenjanin	35	(1)
2010–2011	Borac Banja Luka	10	(1)
2011	Kozara Gradiška	4	(0)
2012–2020	TSV St. Johann	215	(35)
2021–2023	SK Bischofshofen	36	(1)
- * Club domestic league appearances and goals as of 22 August 2023

Milan Srećo (Serbian Cyrillic: Милан Срећо; born 30 January 1984) is a Serbian retired footballer who played as a midfielder.

== Career ==
Srećo came through the youth system of Partizan. He made one league appearance for the first team in the last fixture of the 2004–05 season, as the club won the title. During his time at Partizan, Srećo was also loaned out to Radnički Klupci, Borac Banja Luka, Teleoptik, and Slavija Sarajevo.

After leaving Partizan, Srećo represented numerous clubs such as Grbalj, Mladenovac, Zemun, Banat Zrenjanin, and Kozara Gradiška. He also played for Borac Banja Luka in the 2010–11 season, winning the national championship in his second spell at the club.

In early 2012, Srećo moved to Austria and joined TSV St. Johann. He made over 200 appearances for the club in the Austrian Regionalliga over the course of 10 seasons.

== Career statistics ==
As of 22 August 2021

Club	Season	League		
Club	Season	Division	Apps	Goals
TSV St. Johann	2011–12	Austrian Regionalliga	12	0
TSV St. Johann	2012–13	Austrian Regionalliga	28	3
TSV St. Johann	2013–14	Austrian Regionalliga	26	7
TSV St. Johann	2014–15	Austrian Regionalliga	27	5
TSV St. Johann	2015–16	Austrian Regionalliga	24	4
TSV St. Johann	2016–17	Austrian Regionalliga	25	2
TSV St. Johann	2017–18	Austrian Regionalliga	26	2
TSV St. Johann	2018–19	Austrian Regionalliga	26	8
TSV St. Johann	2019–20	Austrian Regionalliga	18	4
TSV St. Johann	2020–21	Austrian Regionalliga	3	0
TSV St. Johann	Total		215	35

== Honours ==
Partizan

- First League of Serbia and Montenegro: 2004–05

Borac Banja Luka

- Premier League of Bosnia and Herzegovina: 2010–11
