= Bosnia and Herzegovina national under-15 football team =

National association football team

Bosnia and Herzegovina
- Nickname(s): Zmajevi (Dragons); Zlatni Ljiljani (Golden Lilies)
- Association: Football Association of Bosnia and Herzegovina
- Confederation: UEFA (Europe)
- Head coach: Čedomir Ćulum
- FIFA code: BIH
First colours	Second colours

The Bosnia and Herzegovina national under-15 football team is made up by players who are 15 years old or younger and represents Bosnia and Herzegovina in international football matches at this age level. It is controlled by the Football Association of Bosnia and Herzegovina.

== Current squad ==
The following players were called-up for 2023 Memorial Tournament "Vlatko Marković".
Caps and goals correct as of 15 May after 2022 Memorial Tournament "Vlatko Marković".

No.	Pos.	Player	Date of birth (age)	Caps	Goals	Club
	GK	Tarik Banjić	2 February 2008 (age 18)	0	0	(Football Association of Serbia) Partizan
	GK	Kenan Memišević	9 April 2008 (age 18)	0	0	(Austrian Football Association) Hartberg
	DF	Davud Jusić	3 January 2008 (age 18)	0	0	(Austrian Football Association) Sturm Graz
	DF	Jovan Ćulum	5 January 2008 (age 18)	0	0	(Football Association of Bosnia and Herzegovina) Borac Banja Luka
	DF	Edib Dazdarević	10 January 2008 (age 18)	0	0	(Football Association of Bosnia and Herzegovina) Sarajevo
	DF	Hasan Fatušić	8 March 2008 (age 18)	0	0	(Football Association of Bosnia and Herzegovina) Sloga Meridian
	DF	Din Karamehmedović	14 March 2008 (age 18)	0	0	(Football Association of Bosnia and Herzegovina) Sarajevo
	DF	Benjamin Zulović	11 April 2008 (age 18)	0	0	(French Football Federation) Rueil-Malmaison
	DF	Nikša Blagojević	29 May 2008 (age 18)	0	0	(Football Association of Bosnia and Herzegovina) Borac Banja Luka
	DF	Danilo Karanović	15 July 2008 (age 18)	0	0	(Football Association of Serbia) Red Star Belgrade
	MF	Džan Jahić	30 January 2008 (age 18)	0	0	(Football Association of Bosnia and Herzegovina) Željezničar
	MF	Ivan Jelić	28 February 2008 (age 18)	0	0	(Football Association of Bosnia and Herzegovina) Široki Brijeg
	MF	Miloš Soprenić	13 May 2008 (age 18)	0	0	(Football Association of Bosnia and Herzegovina) Borac Banja Luka
	MF	Dario Arifović	28 June 2008 (age 18)	0	0	(Football Association of the Czech Republic) Sparta Brno
	MF	Ervin Slanjankić	8 July 2008 (age 18)	0	0	(Football Association of Bosnia and Herzegovina) Željezničar
	MF	Arman Rebac	29 July 2008 (age 18)	0	0	(Football Association of Bosnia and Herzegovina) Sarajevo
	MF	Said Nišić	5 May 2008 (age 18)	0	0	(Austrian Football Association) Red Bull Salzburg
	MF	Kenan Vrban	19 September 2008 (age 18)	0	0	(Football Association of Bosnia and Herzegovina) Sarajevo
	MF	Muhamed Atajić	15 October 2008 (age 18)	0	0	(Football Association of Bosnia and Herzegovina) Velež Mostar
	FW	Domagoj Šaravanja	12 February 2008 (age 18)	0	0	(Football Association of Bosnia and Herzegovina) Široki Brijeg
	FW	Vukašin Gostimirović	8 April 2008 (age 18)	0	0	(Football Association of Bosnia and Herzegovina) Borac Banja Luka
		Kerim Bajrić		0	0	(Football Association of Bosnia and Herzegovina) Zrinjski Mostar
		Amar Numić		0	0	(German Football Association) VfL Wolfsburg

=== Recent call-ups ===
The following eligible players have been called up for the team within the last twelve months:

Pos.	Player	Date of birth (age)	Caps	Goals	Club	Latest call-up
GK	Ognjen Kosanović		1	0	(Serbia) Grafičar Beograd	2022 Memorial Tournament "Josip Katalinski-Škija"
GK	Alvin Ćosić	19 April 2007 (age 19)	0	0	(Bosnia and Herzegovina) Igman Konjic	v. Serbia, 30 September 2021
DF	Stefan Višekruna	13 October 2008 (age 18)	5	0	(Bosnia and Herzegovina) Borac Banja Luka	v. Czech Republic, 4 April 2023
DF	Anes Šuša	13 October 2007 (age 19)	0	0	(Bosnia and Herzegovina) Igman Konjic	2022 Memorial Tournament "Vlatko Marković"
DF	Stefan Višekruna		2	0	(Bosnia and Herzegovina) Borac Banja Luka	2022 Memorial Tournament "Josip Katalinski-Škija"
DF	Amar Zahirović		2	0	(Bosnia and Herzegovina) Sarajevo	2022 Memorial Tournament "Josip Katalinski-Škija"
DF	Nikša Blagojević		2	0	(Bosnia and Herzegovina) Borac Banja Luka	2022 Memorial Tournament "Josip Katalinski-Škija"
DF	Stefan Stević		1	0	(Serbia) Red Star Belgrade	2022 Memorial Tournament "Josip Katalinski-Škija"
DF	Slavko Dumančić		1	0	(Bosnia and Herzegovina) Posušje	2022 Memorial Tournament "Josip Katalinski-Škija"
DF	Đorđe Zekić	19 June 2007 (age 19)	1	0	(Bosnia and Herzegovina) Tuzla City	v. Montenegro, 10 February 2022
DF	Miloš Jovičević	13 November 2007 (age 18)	2	0	(Serbia) Partizan	v. Serbia, 30 September 2021
DF	Anel Karić	28 August 2007 (age 19)	1	0	Austria Klagenfurt	v. Serbia, 30 September 2021
DF	David Radivojac		0	0	(Bosnia and Herzegovina) Kozara Gradiška	v. Serbia, 30 September 2021
MF	Deni Nuhanović	13 July 2008 (age 18)	2	0	(Bosnia and Herzegovina) Sarajevo	v. Czech Republic, 4 April 2023
MF	Toma Čuić	18 December 2008 (age 17)	0	0	(Bosnia and Herzegovina) Tomislav	v. Czech Republic, 4 April 2023
MF	Amar Alić	2 October 2007 (age 19)	0	0	(Austria) Kapfenberg	2022 Memorial Tournament "Vlatko Marković"
MF	David Jelovac		2	0	(Bosnia and Herzegovina) Velež Mostar	2022 Memorial Tournament "Josip Katalinski-Škija"
MF	Filip Jelčić		2	0	(Bosnia and Herzegovina) Široki Brijeg	2022 Memorial Tournament "Josip Katalinski-Škija"
MF	Amar Višnjić		2	0	(Bosnia and Herzegovina) Željezničar	2022 Memorial Tournament "Josip Katalinski-Škija"
MF	Jozo Bešlić		0	0	(Bosnia and Herzegovina) Posušje	2022 Memorial Tournament "Josip Katalinski-Škija"
MF	Mahir Bešić	23 March 2007 (age 19)	2	0	(Bosnia and Herzegovina) Tuzla City	v. Montenegro, 10 February 2022
MF	Nikolas Zoran	24 December 2007 (age 18)	2	0	(Croatia) Istra 1961	v. Montenegro, 10 February 2022
FW	Nedim Okanović		2	0	(Bosnia and Herzegovina) Tuzla City	2022 Memorial Tournament "Josip Katalinski-Škija"
FW	Dimitrije Raić		2	0	(Bosnia and Herzegovina) Zrinjski Mostar	2022 Memorial Tournament "Josip Katalinski-Škija"
FW	Amar Balić		1	0	(Austria) Team Wiener Linien	2022 Memorial Tournament "Josip Katalinski-Škija"
FW	Faris Dževahirić	16 March 2007 (age 19)	5	4	(Slovenia) Domžale	v. Montenegro, 10 February 2022
^{INJ} Withdrawn due to injury.^{PRE} Preliminary squad.^{SUS} Suspended.^{WD} Withdrew.

== Personnel ==
=== Current technical staff ===
Position	Name
Head coach	(Bosnia and Herzegovina) Čedomir Ćulum
Coach	(Bosnia and Herzegovina) Amir Japaur
Coach	(Bosnia and Herzegovina) Zlatko Čondić
Coach	(Bosnia and Herzegovina) Jure Ivanković
Coach	(Bosnia and Herzegovina) Adis Obad
Goalkeeping coach	(Bosnia and Herzegovina) Aleksandar Božović

=== Managers ===
Dates	Name
2022–present	(Bosnia and Herzegovina) Čedomir Ćulum
2021–2022	(Bosnia and Herzegovina) Igor Janković
2011–2021	(Bosnia and Herzegovina) Zoran Erbez

== See also ==
- Bosnia and Herzegovina national football team
- Bosnia and Herzegovina national under-21 football team
- Bosnia and Herzegovina national under-19 football team
- Bosnia and Herzegovina national under-18 football team
- Bosnia and Herzegovina national under-17 football team
- Bosnia and Herzegovina national under-16 football team
- Bosnia and Herzegovina women's national football team
