= Ivica Barbarić =

Bosnian football manager (born 1962)

Personal information
- Full name: Ivan Barbarić
- Date of birth: 23 February 1962 (age 64)
- Place of birth: Metković, FPR Yugoslavia
- Height: 1.86 m (6 ft 1 in)
- Position: Defender

Senior career*
| Years | Team | Apps | (Gls) |
| 1982–1989 | Velež Mostar | 130 | (3) |
| 1989–1992 | Real Burgos | 86 | (2) |
| 1992–1993 | Racing de Santander | 25 | (0) |
| 1993–1995 | Badajoz | 30 | (1) |
| 1995–1996 | Almería | 7 | (0) |
| Total | | 278 | (6) |

International career
| 1988 | Yugoslavia | 1 | (0) |

Managerial career
- 2001–2003: Zrinjski Mostar
- 2004–2006: Široki Brijeg
- 2007: Široki Brijeg
- 2009: Široki Brijeg
- 2009–2012: Ehime
- 2014–2015: Consadole Sapporo
- 2017: Zrinjski Mostar
- 2021–2022: Bosnia and Herzegovina U19
- 2022–2023: Široki Brijeg
- * Club domestic league appearances and goals

Ivan "Ivica" Barbarić (Croatian pronunciation: [îʋitsa bǎrbaritɕ]; born 23 February 1962) is a Bosnian professional football manager and former player.

== Career ==
As a player, he spent seven years at Velež Mostar with whom he won the 1985–86 Yugoslav Cup. Barbarić ended his playing career in Spain. He got capped once for Yugoslavia and participated in the 1988 Summer Olympics in Seoul as a member of the Yugoslavia national team.

As a manager, Barbarić won the 2005–06 Bosnian Premier League with Široki Brijeg, who he managed on four occasions.

== Managerial statistics ==
As of match played 28 May 2023

Managerial record by team and tenure
| Team | From | To | Record | | | | |
| Team | From | To | G | W | D | L | Win % |
|---|---|---|---|---|---|---|---|
| Zrinjski Mostar | 1 July 2001 | 30 June 2003 | 78 | 35 | 9 | 34 | 44.87 |
| Široki Brijeg | 26 July 2004 | 20 August 2006 | 88 | 46 | 19 | 23 | 52.27 |
| Široki Brijeg | 1 June 2007 | 3 September 2007 | 8 | 4 | 0 | 4 | 50.00 |
| Široki Brijeg | 4 June 2009 | 29 August 2009 | 8 | 2 | 2 | 4 | 25.00 |
| Ehime | 15 September 2009 | 15 November 2012 | 128 | 33 | 44 | 51 | 25.78 |
| Consadole Sapporo | 7 September 2014 | 24 July 2015 | 36 | 12 | 16 | 8 | 33.33 |
| Zrinjski Mostar | 3 January 2017 | 18 March 2017 | 6 | 2 | 1 | 3 | 33.33 |
| Bosnia and Herzegovina U19 | 27 March 2021 | 21 April 2022 | 14 | 6 | 2 | 6 | 42.86 |
| Široki Brijeg | 25 April 2022 | 3 June 2023 | 42 | 15 | 12 | 15 | 35.71 |
| Total | | | 408 | 155 | 105 | 148 | 37.99 |

== Honours ==
=== Player ===
Velež Mostar

- Yugoslav Cup: 1985–86

Real Burgos

- Segunda División: 1989–90

=== Manager ===
Široki Brijeg

- Bosnian Premier League: 2005–06
- Bosnian Cup runner-up: 2004–05, 2005–06
