= Hukić =

Hukić or Hukaj is a surname. Notable people with the surname include:

- Jasmin Hukić (born 1979), Bosnian basketball player
- Muamer Hukić (born 1984), better known as Marco Huck, German boxer
- Mustafa Hukić (1951–1999), Bosnian footballer and manager
- Nizah Hukić (born 1969), football manager
