= Nikola Nikić =

Yugoslav footballer (born 1956)

Personal information
- Date of birth: 7 January 1956 (age 70)
- Place of birth: Modriča, FPR Yugoslavia
- Height: 1.82 m (6 ft 0 in)
- Position: Winger

Senior career*
Years	Team	Apps	(Gls)
1973–1976	Modriča		
1976–1979	Zvijezda Gradačac		
1979–1984	Željezničar	133	(32)
1984–1985	Egaleo	19	(3)
1985–1987	Aris	53	(12)
1987–1988	PAOK	9	(0)
1988–1991	Željezničar	67	(13)
1991–1992	Čelik Zenica		
1992–1993	Borac Banja Luka	11	(2)

Managerial career
- 1993–1998: Modriča
- 1998–2000: Kolubara
- 2001–2004: Modriča
- 2002: Bosnia and Herzegovina U19
- 2004–2007: Bosnia and Herzegovina U19
- 2005–2007: Žepče
- 2007–2008: Bosnia and Herzegovina U21
- 2010: Thermaikos
- 2010: Modriča Maxima
- 2011: TOŠK Tešanj
- 2012–2013: Modriča Maxima
- 2013: Republika Srpska
- 2017–2018: Borac Šamac
- 2018–2022: Bratstvo Gračanica
- 2023–2024: Bratstvo Gračanica
- 2024: Bratstvo Gračanica
- * Club domestic league appearances and goals

Nikola Nikić (Serbian Cyrillic: Никола Никић, pronounced [nǐkola nîkitɕ]; born 7 January 1956) is a Bosnian football manager and former player.

== Playing career ==
Nikić, born to father Ilija and mother Radojka (née Tadić), started his career in the lower leagues with Modriča and Zvijezda Gradačac, before joining Željezničar. Although he was an excellent winger, he became famous for his funny character and truthful nature.

Nikić's was part of the famous Željezničar squad which under the guidance of Ivica Osim reached the UEFA Cup semi-finals in the 1984–85 season. However, he didn't play the semi-final match against Videoton because in December 1984 he moved to Greece where he stayed for four seasons. In the 1984–85 season, he played for galeo making 19 appearances scoring 3 goals. During the 1985–86 and 1986–87 seasons, Nikić played for Aris Thessaloniki, scoring 12 goals in 53 league matches. At the end of the 1986–87 season, he moved to Aris' fierce rival PAOK, but made only 9 appearances matches in the 1987–88 season, failing to score a goal.

Nikić returned to Željezničar in 1988, staying until the middle of the 1990–91 season when he signed with Čelik Zenica. He stayed at Čelik until 1992 when he moved to Borac Banja Luka. Nikić ended his playing career after leaving Borac in 1993.

== Managerial career ==
After ending his career as a professional player, Nikić became a manager. He was the manager of Modriča, Kolubara, Žepče, Thermaikos, TOŠK Tešanj and Borac Šamac and Bratstvo Gračanica. His biggest success was when he led Modriča to promotion to the Bosnian Premier League season after winning the 2002–03 First League of RS.

Nikić was also the head coach of the Bosnia and Herzegovina U19 national team and the Bosnia and Herzegovina U21 team national team. For a brief period, he was also head coach of the Republika Srpska official team (league selection) in September 2013.

== Outside of football ==
While still actively playing football, he had a small acting role in the 1991 movie Holiday in Sarajevo.

He is well-known in Bosnia & Herzegovina for his funny anecdotes in interviews. His official biography was published in 2024 by a Bosnian journalist.

== Personal life ==
Nikić's son Branislav was also a professional player in Bosnia & Herzegovina and Greece where he also played for Zvijezda Gradačac and Čelik Zenica like his father.

== Honours ==
=== Manager ===
Modriča

- First League of RS: 2002–03
