= Nikola Mikelini =

Bosnia and Herzegovina footballer (born 1982)

Personal information
- Date of birth: 27 February 1982 (age 44)
- Place of birth: Gračanica, SFR Yugoslavia
- Height: 1.90 m (6 ft 3 in)
- Position: Defender

Senior career*
Years	Team	Apps	(Gls)
2003–2004	Modriča	30	(2)
2004–2006	Žepče	47	(6)
2006–2007	Čelik Zenica	15	(1)
2007–2009	Sloboda Tuzla	45	(4)
2009	Čapljina	5	(1)
2010	DAC Dunajská Streda	8	(0)
2010	Astra Ploieşti	2	(0)
2011-2012	Atromitos Yeroskipou	7	(0)
2012	OFK Gradina	0	(0)
2013	SPG Palting	2	(0)
2014	USV Fuschl	6	(0)
2014-2015	Rudar Stanari		
2015-2017	Sloga Doboj		
2017-2019	Ozren Petrovo		
2019-2020	Pobjeda Tešanjka		

International career
2008	Bosnia and Herzegovina	1	(0)

Managerial career
- 2020: Vis Simm-Bau (assistant)
- * Club domestic league appearances and goals

Nikola Mikelini (Italian: Michellini; born on 27 February 1982) is a Bosnian football manager and retired player.

== Club career ==
Mikelini had a spell in the Austrian 5th and 4th tiers in 2013 and 2014.

== International career ==
Mikelini made his debut for Bosnia and Herzegovina in a November 2008 friendly match against Slovenia. It remained his sole international appearance.

== Honours ==
=== Player ===
Modrića

- Bosnian Cup: 2003–04
