= Celson =

Brazilian footballer (born 1978)

Personal information
- Full name: Celson Ricardo Borges de Jesus
- Date of birth: 11 December 1978 (age 47)
- Place of birth: Ipiaú, Brazil
- Position: Striker

Senior career*
| Years | Team | Apps | (Gls) |
| 2006 | Colo Colo | | |
| 2006–2008 | Široki Brijeg | | |
- * Club domestic league appearances and goals

Celson Ricardo Borges de Jesus (born 11 December 1978), known as just Celson, is a Brazilian former football player.

== Career ==
He played for Široki Brijeg in Bosnia since he signed from Colo-Colo of Brazil in March 2006.

Celson came to Široki Brijeg during the winter-break of the 2005–06 Premier League of Bosnia and Herzegovina.
