= 2002–03 First League of the Republika Srpska =

The 2002–03 First League of the Republika Srpska season was the eighth since its establishment.

== Teams ==
- Boksit Milići
- BSK Banja Luka
- Drina Zvornik
- Drina HE Višegrad
- Jedinstvo Brčko
- Ljubić Prnjavor
- Modriča
- Napredak Donji Šepak
- Nikos Kanbera Rudanka
- Omladinac Banja Luka
- Ozren Petrovo
- Polet Bosanski Brod
- Radnik Bijeljina
- Rudar Prijedor
- Slavija Sarajevo
- Sloboda Novi Grad

== League standings ==
Pos	Team	Pld	W	D	L	GF	GA	GD	Pts	Promotion or relegation
1	Modriča (C, P)	28	21	5	2	52	15	+37	68	Promotion to Premijer Liga BiH
2	Slavija	28	19	4	5	52	17	+35	61	
3	Ljubić	28	14	4	10	48	40	+8	46	
4	Sloboda Novi Grad	28	13	5	10	43	43	0	44	
5	Jedinstvo Brčko	28	12	5	11	35	25	+10	41	
6	Napredak	28	12	5	11	47	46	+1	41	
7	Omladinac	28	10	8	10	33	28	+5	38	
8	BSK	28	11	5	12	30	34	−4	38	
9	Drina Višegrad	28	11	3	14	30	29	+1	36	
10	Radnik	28	10	4	14	32	38	−6	34	
11	Rudar Prijedor	28	10	4	14	31	41	−10	34	
12	Nikos Kanbera	28	8	8	12	43	50	−7	32	
13	Drina Zvornik	28	8	5	15	29	46	−17	29	
14	Polet (R)	28	8	3	17	23	45	−22	27	Relegation to Second League RS
15	Ozren (R)	28	6	6	16	24	55	−31	24	Relegation to Second League RS
–	Boksit (R)	0	0	0	0	0	0	0	0	Relegation to Second League RS

Source: RSSSF.org
Rules for classification: 1) points; 2) goal difference; 3) number of goals scored.
(C) Champions; (P) Promoted; (R) Relegated
