= Mickaël Mazzoli =

Saint Martin footballer (born 1987)

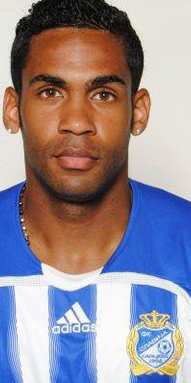
Mickael Mazzoli at Slavija

Mickaël Mazzoli (born 27 March 1987) is a Saint Martin international football midfielder last playing with FK Slavija in the Premier League of Bosnia and Herzegovina.

He has previously played with SO Châtellerault in French CFA Groupe D NEGRO (4th tier) during the 2007-08 season. He also played with Saint-Louis Stars in Saint Martin. Next season 2009/2010 he played with Paris FC French third division He moved to Bosnia in summer 2011 to sign with top league club FK Slavija Sarajevo. In the season 2013–14 he played in Swiss fourth level with FC Monthey.

He is part of the Saint Martin national football team since 2006 and was part of the team at the 2010 Caribbean Championship.
