= Borislav Mikić =

Bosnian footballer

Personal information
- Full name: Borislav Mikić
- Date of birth: 20 December 1975 (age 50)
- Place of birth: Prijedor, SFR Yugoslavia
- Height: 1.75 m (5 ft 9 in)
- Position: Midfielder

Youth career
- Dinamo Zagreb
- Rudar Ljubija
- Sloga Petrovac

Senior career*
Years	Team	Apps	(Gls)
1996–1997	Sartid Smederevo	20	(3)
1997–1998	Železničar Smederevo		
1998–1999	Železničar Lajkovac		
1999–2000	Borac Čačak	11	(1)
2000–2002	Remont Čačak		
2002–2005	Železnik	87	(14)
2005	Voždovac	14	(2)
2006	Diyarbakırspor	14	(3)
2006–2007	Banat Zrenjanin	32	(9)
2008–2010	Laktaši	45	(12)
2010–2011	Borac Banja Luka	38	(3)
2012–2014	Rudar Prijedor	65	(14)
2015–2016	Podgrmeč	26	(8)
2016-	FSA Prijedor		
- * Club domestic league appearances and goals as of 2 April 2020

Borislav Mikić (Serbian Cyrillic: Борислав Микић; born 20 December 1975) is a Bosnian footballer who is playing as a midfielder for FSA Prijedor.

== Club career ==
After spending almost a decade in the youth academy of Dinamo Zagreb, Mikić was forced to leave Croatia due to the Yugoslav Wars and return with his family to his hometown of Prijedor. He spent some time playing for Rudar Ljubija, before moving to Serbia and settling in the town of Petrovac na Mlavi. Over the following years, Mikić played for Sloga Petrovac, Sartid Smederevo, Železničar Smederevo, Železničar Lajkovac, Borac Čačak, and Remont Čačak. He eventually made a name for himself at Železnik, helping the club win the Serbia and Montenegro Cup in 2005.

In early 2008, Mikić returned to his birth country and joined Laktaši. He spent two and a half seasons with the club, but left following relegation from the top flight. In June 2010, Mikić signed with Borac Banja Luka, helping them win the national championship for the first time in history. He rejoined Rudar Prijedor in early 2012.

== Career statistics ==
Club	Season	League	
Club	Season	Apps	Goals
Železnik	2002–03	32	1
Železnik	2003–04	29	10
Železnik	2004–05	26	3
Voždovac	2005–06	14	2
Diyarbakırspor	2005–06	14	3
Banat Zrenjanin	2006–07	17	2
Banat Zrenjanin	2007–08	15	7
Laktaši	2007–08	8	4
Laktaši	2008–09	15	2
Laktaši	2009–10	22	6
Borac Banja Luka	2010–11	24	1
Borac Banja Luka	2011–12	14	2
Rudar Prijedor	2011–12	11	0
Rudar Prijedor	2012–13	25	8
Rudar Prijedor	2013–14	20	5
Rudar Prijedor	2014–15	9	1
Podgrmeč	2014–15	11	3
Podgrmeč	2015–16	15	5
Career total		321	65

== Honours ==
Železnik

- Serbia and Montenegro Cup: 2004–05

Borac Banja Luka

- Premier League of Bosnia and Herzegovina: 2010–11
