= Daniel Stankovič =

Slovenian footballer

Personal information
- Full name: Daniel Stankovič
- Date of birth: 11 April 1984 (age 42)
- Place of birth: SFR Yugoslavia
- Height: 1.78 m (5 ft 10 in)
- Position: Forward

Senior career*
Years	Team	Apps	(Gls)
2003–2006	Rudar Velenje	44	(1)
2006–2009	Slavija Sarajevo	0	(0)
2009–2013	Famos Vojkovići		
- * Club domestic league appearances and goals as of 10 August 2009

Daniel Stankovič (born 11 April 1984) is a Slovenian retired football player.
