= Toni Szabó =

Hungarian footballer and manager

Personal information
- Full name: Antal Szabó
- Place of birth: Austro-Hungary
- Date of death: Uncknown
- Position: Midfielder

Senior career*
| Years | Team | Apps | (Gls) |
| 1918–1920 | Vasas | 6 | (3) |
| 1920–1921 | Budapesti AK | 17 | (4) |
| 1921–1924 | BSK | | |
| 1924–19xx | Slavija Sarajevo | | |

Managerial career
- 1923–1924: BSK (youth)
- 1924: PSK Pančevo
- 1924–19xx: Slavija Sarajevo
- Sport Sombor
- Salgótarjáni BTC
- ŽSK Veliki Bečkerek
- 1939: Jugoslavija Jabuka
- * Club domestic league appearances and goals

Antal "Toni" Szabó was a Hungarian football manager and player.

== Club career ==
Szabó played with Vasas SC along Ferenc Plattkó and received a call for the Hungarian national team in 1917 for a game against Austria (Hungary won 4–1, Szabó didn't debut). Then he played with Budapesti AK in the 1920–21 Hungarian championship. It was the post-World War I period and Szabó decided to leave Hungary and moved to Yugoslavia where he joined Serbian side BSK. In BSK, besides player, he also became coach of the youth teams. Szabó became among the pioneers in Serbia in the field of youth development. BSK was along SK Jugoslavija the dominating Serbian club, and Szabó youth program produced players such as Blagoje "Moša" Marjanović and Aleksandar Tirnanić which, soon after, became best Yugoslav players. As first-team player, Szabó became among BSK key-players. His exhibitions kept the fans impressed, and specially notorious was the time when he scored all three goals in a 3–1 victory of BSK against Ferencvárosi TC. The three goals he scored against his compatriots entered history because they sealed what became the first ever victory of any Yugoslav club against Ferencvaros, considered back then unbeatable.

Aiming to further improve his coaching skills, Szabó left BSK in summer 1924 and became the main coach of PSK Pančevo. Not long afterwards he moved to FK Slavija Sarajevo where he took the role of player-manager and contributed greatly to Slavija's rise to become among top Yugoslav clubs. For a period he settled in Sarajevo where he also married. Later, he moved to Sombor. He left Hungary as an army deserter, and while he was in Sombor he received an update that in Hungary the new government proclaimed amnesty for army deserters. He left Sombor and returned to Hungary where he tool charge as manager of Salgótarjáni BTC which included young Gyula Zsengellér at that time. Later, he returned to Yugoslavia where ŽSK Veliki Bečkerek appointed him manager. Besides all these Serbian clubs, while in Yugoslavia, Szabó also coached Croatian cubs Hajduk Osijek, Građanski Osijek, NK Marsonia and Kroacija Zagreb. By March 1939 he was coaching Jugoslavija Jabuka, a club that Szabó drove from the provincial leagues to the 1940–41 Serbian League.
