= 2005–06 Premier League of Bosnia and Herzegovina =

Premijer Liga
- Season: 2005–06
- Champions: Široki Brijeg; 2nd Premier League title 2nd Bosnian title
- Relegated: Travnik; Budućnost
- Champions League: Široki Brijeg
- UEFA Cup: Sarajevo; Orašje
- Intertoto Cup: Zrinjski
- Matches played: 240
- Goals scored: 633 (2.64 per match)
- Top goalscorer: Petar Jelić (19 goals)

Statistics of Premier League of Bosnia and Herzegovina in the 2005–2006 football season.

== Overview ==
It was contested by 16 teams, and NK Široki Brijeg won the championship.

== Clubs and stadiums ==
Location of clubs in Premijer Liga 2005-06

Team	Location
Budućnost	Banovići
Čelik	Zenica
Jedinstvo	Bihać
Leotar	Trebinje
Modriča Maxima	Modriča
Orašje	Orašje
Posušje	Posušje
Radnik	Bijeljina
Sarajevo	Sarajevo
Slavija	Istočno Sarajevo
Sloboda	Tuzla
Široki Brijeg	Široki Brijeg
Travnik	Travnik
Zrinjski	Mostar
Željezničar	Sarajevo
Žepče Limorad	Žepče

== League standings ==
Pos	Team	Pld	W	D	L	GF	GA	GD	Pts	Qualification or relegation
1	Široki Brijeg (C)	30	19	6	5	38	19	+19	63	Qualification to Champions League first qualifying round
2	Sarajevo	30	18	6	6	57	26	+31	60	Qualification to UEFA Cup first qualifying round
3	Zrinjski	30	17	3	10	47	29	+18	54	Qualification to Intertoto Cup first round
4	Modriča	30	17	2	11	53	30	+23	53	
5	Slavija	30	12	5	13	41	47	−6	41	
6	Željezničar	30	11	7	12	38	33	+5	40	
7	Jedinstvo Bihać	30	13	1	16	38	41	−3	40	
8	Žepče	30	11	7	12	29	40	−11	40	
9	Leotar	30	12	3	15	43	48	−5	39	
10	Posušje	30	12	3	15	38	46	−8	39	
11	Sloboda Tuzla	30	11	6	13	31	40	−9	39	
12	Orašje	30	12	2	16	51	51	0	38	Qualification to UEFA Cup first qualifying round (Note: Orašje won the 2005–06 Bosnian Cup and qualified for the first qualifying round of the UEFA Cup.)
13	Radnik	30	11	5	14	37	52	−15	38	
14	Čelik	30	10	5	15	33	45	−12	35	
15	Travnik (R)	30	10	4	16	33	41	−8	34	Relegation to Prva Liga FBiH
16	Budućnost (R)	30	10	3	17	29	48	−19	33	Relegation to Prva Liga FBiH

Source: RSSSF.org
Rules for classification: 1) points; 2) goal difference; 3) number of goals scored.
(C) Champions; (R) Relegated

== Results ==
Home \ Away	BUD	ČEL	JED	LEO	MOD	ORA	POS	RAD	SAR	SLA	SLO	ŠB	TRA	ZRI	ŽEL	ŽEP
Budućnost		2–1	1–0	1–1	1–0	3–1	1–0	5–0	3–3	1–3	0–1	0–0	1–0	1–0	2–1	0–2
Čelik	3–0		3–0	3–1	1–0	4–1	2–1	1–0	2–1	1–4	0–0	2–0	1–1	0–2	0–0	1–1
Jedinstvo Bihać	2–0	4–1		2–1	1–3	2–0	3–0	2–0	1–0	5–0	2–1	0–2	1–0	1–3	2–0	3–0
Leotar	1–3	1–0	2–0		2–1	4–2	5–2	1–3	1–1	3–2	1–0	3–1	1–1	2–1	1–0	5–1
Modriča	4–1	1–0	3–2	2–1		3–1	1–0	4–1	2–0	1–0	2–0	1–0	4–0	3–0	1–1	4–0
Orašje	1–0	3–2	5–1	3–0	1–0		2–3	6–1	1–1	4–1	4–1	1–3	3–0	1–2	1–0	2–0
Posušje	1–0	3–0	1–1	4–2	2–0	1–0		0–0	0–1	4–1	3–2	1–2	1–0	2–1	1–0	4–1
Radnik	2–0	3–0	3–0	2–1	5–4	1–0	4–1		0–3	1–0	0–0	0–1	2–1	1–3	3–1	1–1
Sarajevo	2–1	6–1	2–0	1–0	2–1	5–1	3–0	4–1		1–1	2–0	3–0	3–0	1–0	0–0	2–0
Slavija	3–0	2–1	0–1	1–0	3–1	3–0	4–0	0–0	1–1		1–0	1–1	3–2	2–1	1–4	1–0
Sloboda Tuzla	3–0	3–0	2–1	1–0	0–4	0–0	3–2	3–0	1–3	1–0		0–0	1–0	2–1	1–1	3–1
Široki Brijeg	1–0	2–0	1–0	3–0	2–1	2–1	1–1	2–1	2–1	3–0	1–0		3–0	1–0	2–0	0–2
Travnik	5–0	0–2	2–0	3–1	1–0	4–2	1–0	3–2	2–0	2–0	2–0	0–1		1–1	0–2	1–1
Zrinjski	2–0	2–1	2–0	2–0	1–0	1–0	1–0	4–0	3–1	3–0	4–1	0–0	3–1		1–1	2–1
Željezničar	3–1	0–0	2–1	0–2	1–2	2–1	3–0	0–0	0–1	4–2	5–1	0–1	1–0	3–1		2–1
Žepče	2–1	1–0	1–0	2–0	0–0	1–3	1–0	1–0	1–3	1–1	0–0	0–0	1–0	2–0	3–1	

Source: RSSSF.org
Legend: Blue = home team win; Yellow = draw; Red = away team win.

== Top goalscorers ==
Rank	Player	Club	Goals
1	(Bosnia and Herzegovina) Petar Jelić	Modriča	19
2	(Bosnia and Herzegovina) Damir Tosunović	Orašje	12
3	(Croatia) Domagoj Abramović	Široki Brijeg	10
4	(Bosnia and Herzegovina) Alen Avdić	Sarajevo	9
4	(Bosnia and Herzegovina) Stevo Nikolić	Modriča	9
4	(Bosnia and Herzegovina) Milanko Đerić	Slavija	9
4	(Bosnia and Herzegovina) Rajko Golubović	Leotar	9
4	(Bosnia and Herzegovina) Slaven Damjanović	Orašje	9
9	(Bosnia and Herzegovina) Igor Radovanović	Slavija	8
9	(Bosnia and Herzegovina) Sretko Vuksanović	Slavija	8
