= Bojan Regoje =

Bosnian football manager (born 1981)

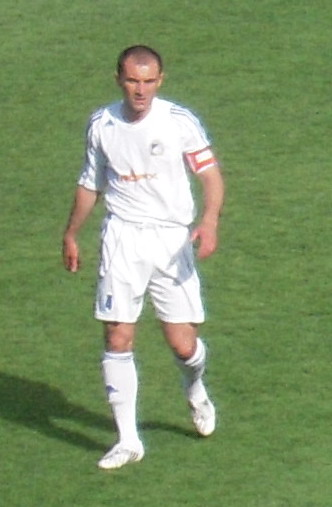
- Regoje playing for Slavija Sarajevo in 2009

Personal information
- Full name: Bojan Regoje
- Date of birth: 2 December 1981 (age 44)
- Place of birth: Sarajevo, SFR Yugoslavia
- Height: 1.86 m (6 ft 1 in)
- Position: Defender

Team information
- Current team: Čelik Zenica (manager)

Senior career*
Years	Team	Apps	(Gls)
2003–2011	Slavija Sarajevo	155	(9)
2011–2016	Olimpik	141	(8)
2017	Čelik Zenica	13	(2)
2017–2018	Mladost Doboj Kakanj	21	(2)
2018–2019	Slavija Sarajevo	27	(2)
Total		357	(23)

International career
2008	Bosnia and Herzegovina	2	(0)

Managerial career
- 2021–2024: Slavija Sarajevo
- 2024: Goražde
- 2025–: Čelik Zenica
- * Club domestic league appearances and goals

Bojan Regoje (Serbian Cyrillic: Бојан Регоје; born 2 December 1981) is a Bosnian professional football manager and former player who is the manager of Bosnian Premier League club Čelik Zenica.

== International career ==
Regoje made his debut for Bosnia and Herzegovina in a January 2008 friendly match away against Japan and has earned a total of 2 caps, scoring no goals. His second and final international was a June 2008 friendly against Azerbaijan.

== Managerial statistics ==
As of match played 7 November 2026

Team	From	To	Record							
Team	From	To	P	W	D	L	GF	GA	GD	W%
Slavija Sarajevo	6 April 2021	1 April 2024	98	40	22	36	131	123	+8	40.82
Goražde	1 August 2024	14 December 2024	15	4	6	5	12	19	−7	26.67
Čelik Zenica	19 March 2025	Present	54	28	16	10	89	49	+40	51.85
Total			167	72	44	51	232	191	+41	43.11

== Honours ==
=== Player ===
Slavija Sarajevo

- First League of RS: 2003–04
- Bosnian Cup: 2008–09

Olimpik

- Bosnian Cup: 2014–15

=== Manager ===
Čelik Zenica

- First League of FBiH: 2025–26
