= Karl Harmer =

Austrian association football player and manager

Personal information
- Full name: Karl Harmer
- Date of birth: 1888
- Place of birth: Austro-Hungary
- Date of death: September 1966 (78 years)
- Position: Defender

Senior career*
| Years | Team | Apps | (Gls) |
| 1907–1908 | Rapid Wien | | |
| 1908–1911 | Slavija Sarajevo | | |
| 1915–1916 | Rapid Wien | 1 | (0) |
| 1917–1918 | Germania Schwechat | | |

International career
| 1907 | Austria | 1 | (0) |

Managerial career
- 1908–1911: Slavija Sarajevo
- 1930: Ternana
- * Club domestic league appearances and goals

Karl Harmer (1888 – September 1966) was an Austrian football manager and former player.

== Club career ==
He played with SK Rapid Wien on two occasions, first in 1907–08 and then on 1915–16, having won the Austrian Championship in 1915–16. He also played with FK Slavija Sarajevo, then part of Austro-Hungary as Condominium of Bosnia and Herzegovina. In 1917–18 he played back in Austrian championship with Germania Schwechat.

== International career ==
Karl Harmer made one appearance for the Austria national football team, on November 3, 1907, in a game against Hungary.

== Coaching career ==
During his spell in Sarajevo with Slavia, he had the role of player-coach. Later, he made use of his coaching experience there, and after retiring from active playing he coached Italian side Ternana Calcio in 1930.

== Honours ==
Rapid Wien

- Austrian Championship: 1915–16
