= Goran Peleš =

Bosnian-Herzegovinian footballer

Personal information
- Full name: Goran Peleš
- Date of birth: 9 March 1953
- Place of birth: Modriča, SFR Yugoslavia
- Date of death: 4 September 2010 (aged 57)
- Place of death: Zenica, Bosnia and Herzegovina
- Position: Midfielder

Youth career
- –1971: FK Modriča

Senior career*
| Years | Team | Apps | (Gls) |
| 1971–1980 | Čelik Zenica | | |
| 1981–1982 | Mallorca | 14 | (2) |
- * Club domestic league appearances and goals

Goran Peleš (9 March 1953 – 4 September 2010) was a Bosnian-Herzegovinian footballer, who is most noted for his career with NK Čelik Zenica.

== Playing career ==
=== Club ===
He started his career in his hometown, where he played for FK Modriča, from where he joined NK Čelik Zenica in 1971, where he won the Mitropa Cup in the following two years with his new club. He was one of the heroes of the second cup win, where he made an assist to Mirsad Galijašević for the only goal that decided the final game against ACF Fiorentina.

He joined Mallorca in 1981, where he played for one season.

After that, he shortly played football during the 1980s almost for recreation for NK Urania from Baška Voda and one futsal team, where he also owned a restaurant with former teammate Rade Radulović.

== Managerial career ==
He successfully managed the youth teams of NK Čelik Zenica, where he coached some of the biggest club's prospects, including Jasmin Burić, Fenan Salčinović and Eldin Adilović.

He died in 2010 after a long illness.
