= Ilija Prodanović =

Bosnian footballer (born 1979)

Personal information
- Date of birth: 16 October 1979 (age 47)
- Place of birth: Bečej, SFR Yugoslavia
- Height: 1.85 m (6 ft 1 in)
- Position: Defender

Senior career*
| Years | Team | Apps | (Gls) |
| 2002–2003 | Mladost Goša | | |
| 2003–2005 | Slavija Sarajevo | 49 | (1) |
| 2006–2007 | Zrinjski Mostar | 20 | (1) |
| 2007–2009 | Sloboda Tuzla | 57 | (5) |
| 2010 | Zvijezda Gradačac | 12 | (2) |
| 2010 | Mughan | 11 | (0) |
| 2011 | Zvijezda Gradačac | 6 | (0) |
| 2011 | Slavija Sarajevo | 0 | (0) |
| 2012 | Dunajská Streda | 2 | (0) |

International career
| 2009 | Bosnia and Herzegovina | 1 | (0) |
- * Club domestic league appearances and goals

Ilija Prodanović (born 16 October 1979) is a Bosnian-Herzegovinian former professional footballer who played as a defender in Serbia and Montenegro, Bosnia and Herzegovina, Azerbaijan and Slovakia.

== International career ==
Prodanović played once for Bosnia and Herzegovina, in a June 2009 friendly match against Uzbekistan.

== Career statistics ==
Bosnia and Herzegovina
| Year | Apps | Goals |
|---|---|---|
| 2009 | 1 | 0 |
| Total | 1 | 0 |

Statistics accurate as of match played 1 June 2009
