= Adnan Örnek =

Turkish footballer and manager

Personal information
- Full name: Adnan Örnek
- Date of birth: 17 October 1965 (age 61)
- Place of birth: Bursa, Turkey
- Position: Defender

Senior career*
Years	Team	Apps	(Gls)
1986–1998	Bursaspor	265	(9)
Total		265	(9)

Managerial career
- 2016–2017: Bursaspor (Youth Coordinator)
- 2017: Bursaspor (caretaker)
- 2018–2019: Čelik Zenica
- * Club domestic league appearances and goals

Adnan Örnek (born 17 October 1965) is a Turkish professional football manager and former player.

== Playing career ==
Born in Bursa, Turkey, Örnek spent his whole career at hometown club Bursaspor. He debuted for the club in the summer of 1986 and retired after the end of the 1997–98 Turkish Süper Lig season in May 1998. For Bursaspor, he appeared in 265 league games and scored 9 goals. Örnek was also the club captain for 6 years.

== Managerial career ==
=== Bursaspor ===
Örnek started off his managerial career in May 2017 when he was named caretaker manager of Bursaspor. He stayed at that position until the end of May, that is until the end of the 2016–17 Süper Lig season.

=== Čelik Zenica ===
On 14 June 2018, Örnek became the new manager of Bosnian Premier League club Čelik Zenica. His first win as Čelik's manager came on 29 July 2018, in a 1–0 home league win against Željezničar.

On 23 February 2019, after Čelik beat Sloboda Tuzla 2–1 in a league match, Örnek unexpectedly left the club after numerous problems and disagreements with the club's board of directors.

== Managerial statistics ==
As of 23 February 2019

Team	Nat	From	To	Record							
Team	Nat	From	To	G	W	D	L	GF	GA	GD	Win %
Bursaspor (caretaker)	(Turkey)	2 May 2017	29 May 2017	4	0	0	4	2	12	−10	0.00
Čelik Zenica	(Bosnia and Herzegovina)	14 June 2018	23 February 2019	21	6	6	9	18	31	−13	28.57
Total				25	6	6	13	20	43	−23	24.00
