= Kemal Hafizović =

Bosnian football manager (born 1950)

Personal information
- Date of birth: 12 May 1950 (age 76)
- Place of birth: Zenica, FPR Yugoslavia
- Position: Winger

Youth career
- 1963–1968: Čelik Zenica

Senior career*
Years	Team	Apps	(Gls)
1968–1974	Rudar Kakanj		
1974–1978	Čelik Zenica	87	(14)
1978	Toronto Blizzard	12	(4)
1979	Maribor	13	(4)

Managerial career
- 1986–1989: Rudar Kakanj
- 1989–1992: Čelik Zenica
- 1996–1997: Čelik Zenica
- 2001: Čelik Zenica
- 2002–2003: Velež Mostar
- 2003–2004: Čelik Zenica
- 2005: Velež Mostar
- 2006: Čelik Zenica
- 2007–2008: Travnik
- 2008–2010: Krajišnik Velika Kladuša
- 2012–2013: Rudar Kakanj
- 2017: Čelik Zenica
- * Club domestic league appearances and goals

Kemal Hafizović (born 12 May 1950) is a Bosnian professional football manager and former player, best known for his playing and managerial career with hometown club Čelik Zenica.

Apart from his 1996–97 title winning season with Čelik, Hafizović is also remembered as leading Čelik to UEFA Intertoto Cup wins against Turkish club Denizlispor and Belgian club Gent in 2001.

== Honours ==
=== Manager ===
Čelik Zenica

- Bosnian First League: 1996–97
