= Slaviša Božičić =

Serbian football manager

Personal information
- Date of birth: 8 January 1966 (age 60)
- Place of birth: Zemun, SFR Yugoslavia

Managerial career
- Years: Team
- 2001: Milicionar
- 2002–2003: Red Star Belgrade (youth)
- 2003–2004: Bežanija
- 2006–2007: Borac Šamac
- 2007–2008: Modriča
- 2008–2009: Bežanija
- 2011: Rudar Kakanj
- 2012: Borac Banja Luka
- 2013–2014: Slavija Sarajevo
- 2016: Montego Bay United
- 2017: Borac Vienna
- 2018: Sinđelić Beograd
- 2018: Jedinstvo Surčin
- 2019: Jagodina
- 2019: Radnik Surdulica
- 2019: Čelik Zenica
- 2020: King Faisal
- 2024: Zlatibor Čajetina

Slaviša Božičić (Serbian Cyrillic: Славиша Божичић; born 8 January 1966) is a Serbian football manager.

== Managerial career ==
Božičić started off his managerial career at FK Milicionar. After Milicionar, Božičić worked with the youth teams of Red Star Belgrade. He then managed FK Bežanija being fired early into the 2004–05 Second League of Serbia and Montenegro.

After a one season stint at FK Borac Šamac in the First League of the Republika Srpska, Božičić became the new manager of Premier League of Bosnia and Herzegovina club FK Modriča. He had big success with Modriča, winning the club's historic 2007–08 Premier League of Bosnia and Herzegovina title. After leaving Modriča in June 2008, he returned to Bežanija who he managed for one more year.

In 2011, he was in charge of FK Rudar Kakanj, while in 2012, he was the manager of FK Borac Banja Luka and from November 2013 to March 2014, he led FK Slavija Sarajevo.

Two years after getting sacked at Slavija, Božičić held the position of head coach of National Premier League club Montego Bay United from August to December 2016. After Montego Bay, he had stints at Austrian club FK Borac Vienna and Serbian clubs FK Sinđelić Beograd, FK Jedinstvo Surčin, FK Jagodina Tabane and FK Radnik Surdulica.

On 4 October 2019, Božičić was announced as the new manager of Bosnian Premier League club NK Čelik Zenica. In his first game as manager, Čelik beat NK Široki Brijeg at home 2–0 in a league match, only one day after Božičić came to the club, on 5 October. His first loss as Čelik manager was in a 2–0 away loss against FK Sarajevo on 18 October 2019. On 3 December 2019, Čelik and Božičić decided to terminate his contract on mutual agreement.

== Honours ==
Modriča

- Bosnian Premier League: 2007–08
