= Nizah Hukić =

Bosnian football manager (born 1969)

Personal information
- Date of birth: 23 February 1969 (age 57)
- Place of birth: Zenica, SR Bosnia and Herzegovina, SFR Yugoslavia
- Position: Midfielder

Youth career
- Čelik Zenica

Senior career*
Years	Team	Apps	(Gls)
1995–2001	Čelik Zenica	108	(12)
Total		108	(12)

Managerial career
- 2013–2014: Čelik Zenica
- * Club domestic league appearances and goals

Nizah Hukić (born 23 February 1969) is a Bosnian football manager and former player. He has both played for and managed Bosnian club Čelik Zenica.

== Playing career ==
Born in Zenica, SFR Yugoslavia, present day Bosnia and Herzegovina, Hukić played for his hometown club Čelik Zenica during the 1990s. He won two league titles and one cup with the club, being one of its main players during that time. Hukić finished his playing career at Čelik.

== Managerial career ==
=== Čelik Zenica ===
After years of being an assistant manager, Hukić became the new manager of Čelik Zenica on 30 October 2013, though only as a caretaker at first, after former manager Vlado Jagodić got sacked. After making good results, he signed a full-time contract with Čelik on 1 December 2013. In his first season as the club's manager, Hukić guided Čelik to a decent 7th-place finish in the league and to the 2013–14 Bosnian Cup final in which Čelik lost against Sarajevo in both matches of the final. In the next season however, things did not look good at the start, and Hukić resigned from his position as manager after a 1–0 home loss against Drina Zvornik on 27 September 2014.

== Personal life ==
On 19 March 2018, Hukić suffered a heart attack and was rushed to a hospital in Sarajevo where he had a successful surgery in which three stents were built-in his heart.

== Career statistics ==
=== Club ===
Appearances and goals by club, season and competition
Club	Season	League			Cup		Continental		Total	
Club	Season	Division	Apps	Goals	Apps	Goals	Apps	Goals	Apps	Goals
Čelik Zenica	1995–96	Bosnian First League	22	6	3	0	—		25	6
Čelik Zenica	1996–97	Bosnian First League	21	3	1	0	—		22	3
Čelik Zenica	1997–98	Bosnian First League	12	1	1	0	—		13	1
Čelik Zenica	1998–99	Bosnian First League	8	0	0	0	—		8	0
Čelik Zenica	1999–2000	Bosnian First League	27	2	2	0	—		29	2
Čelik Zenica	2000–01	Bosnian Premier League	18	0	3	0	—		21	0
Čelik Zenica	Total		108	12	10	0	—		118	12
Career total			108	12	10	0	—		118	12

== Managerial statistics ==
As of 27 September 2014

Managerial record by team and tenure
Team	From	To	Record							
Team	From	To	G	W	D	L	GF	GA	GD	Win %
Čelik Zenica	30 October 2013	27 September 2014	31	10	10	11	32	33	−1	32.26
Total			31	10	10	11	32	33	−1	32.26

== Honours ==
=== Player ===
Čelik Zenica

- Bosnian First League: 1995–96, 1996–97
- Bosnian Cup: 1995–96

=== Manager ===
Čelik Zenica

- Bosnian Cup runner-up: 2013–14
