= FK Ozren Petrovo =

Ozren Petrovo
- Full name: Fudbalski klub Ozren Petrovo
- League: Second League RS - West
- 2015–16: Second League RS - West, 9th
Home colours	Away colours

Fudbalski klub Ozren Petrovo (Serbian Cyrillic: Фудбалски клуб Oзpeн Пeтpoвo) is a football club based in Petrovo, Republika Srpska, Bosnia and Herzegovina.

It currently plays in the Second League of the Republika Srpska.
