= Milomir Odović =

Bosnian footballer (1955–2020)

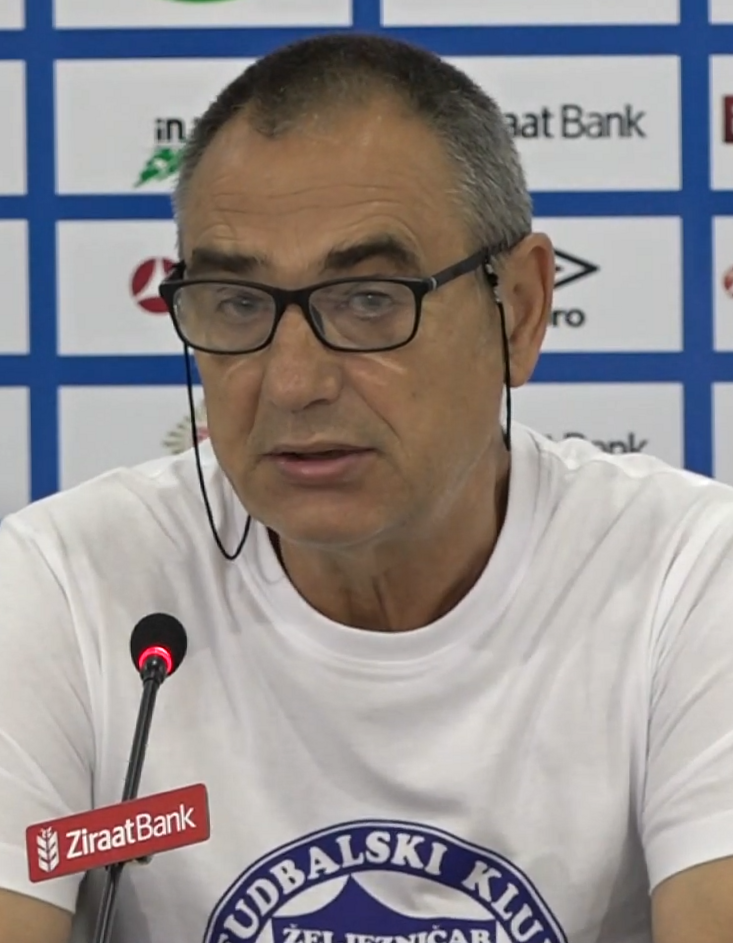
- Odović with Željezničar in 2018

Personal information
- Date of birth: 26 March 1955
- Place of birth: Ilijaš, FPR Yugoslavia
- Date of death: 15 December 2020 (aged 65)
- Place of death: Sarajevo, Bosnia and Herzegovina
- Position: Left winger

Youth career
- Sloga Ilijaš
- –1974: Željezničar

Senior career*
| Years | Team | Apps | (Gls) |
| 1974–1984 | Željezničar | 230 | (22) |
| 1985–1986 | Linz | 55 | (7) |
| 1986–1988 | Spittal | 31 | (4) |
| Total | | 316 | (33) |

Managerial career
- 2003–2004: Željezničar
- 2005–2007: Slavija Sarajevo
- 2007–2008: Borac Banja Luka
- 2009–2010: Slavija Sarajevo
- 2011: Velež Mostar
- 2011–2012: GOŠK Gabela
- 2012–2013: Zvijezda Gradačac
- 2013−2014: Rudar Kakanj
- 2014–2015: Čelik Zenica
- 2015: Željezničar
- 2016: Olimpik
- 2016–2017: Slavija Sarajevo
- 2018: Željezničar
- * Club domestic league appearances and goals

Milomir Odović (26 March 1955 – 15 December 2020) was a Bosnian professional football manager and player, best known for his playing and managing days at Bosnian Premier League club Željezničar, where he is a club legend.

As a player, Odović played as a left winger for the already mentioned Željezničar and Austrian clubs Linz and Spittal. As a manager, he managed a lot of Bosnian clubs, among others being Željezničar, Slavija Sarajevo, Borac Banja Luka, Velež Mostar and Čelik Zenica.

== Playing career ==
Born in Ilijaš, a town just outside Sarajevo, in the SFR Yugoslavia on 26 March 1955, Odović started playing football for local club Sloga. As a talented youngster, he was asked to come and play for Željezničar, making his official debut for the club in 1974. Odović would go on to play almost 11 years for Željezničar, making 230 league appearances and scoring 22 league goals for the club. He was part of the Željezničar team that faced Velež Mostar in the 1980–81 Yugoslav Cup final.

He also played in Austria for Linz from 1985 to 1986 and for Spittal from 1986 to 1988. Odović ended his playing career in the summer of 1988 after leaving Spittal.

== Managerial career ==
After the end of an active professional career as a player, Odović became a professional manager. He worked as a manager in Slavija Sarajevo on three occasions, where they were the 2006–07 Bosnian Cup runners-up. Odović also managed Željezničar, Borac Banja Luka, Velež Mostar, GOŠK Gabela, Zvijezda Gradačac, Rudar Kakanj, Čelik Zenica and Olimpik.

He managed Željezničar where he left the position of manager on 27 November 2018 after 4 consecutive league losses in the 2018–19 season, but it was announced that Odović would however stay in the club and would coach the young players in Željezničar's academy.

== Death ==
Odović died on 15 December 2020 at the age of 65, two years after being diagnosed with cancer.

== Honours ==
=== Player ===
Željezničar

- Yugoslav Second League: 1977–78 (West)

=== Manager ===
Slavija Sarajevo

- Bosnian Cup runner-up: 2006–07
