= NK Široki Brijeg =

Association football club in Bosnia and Herzegovina

Široki Brijeg
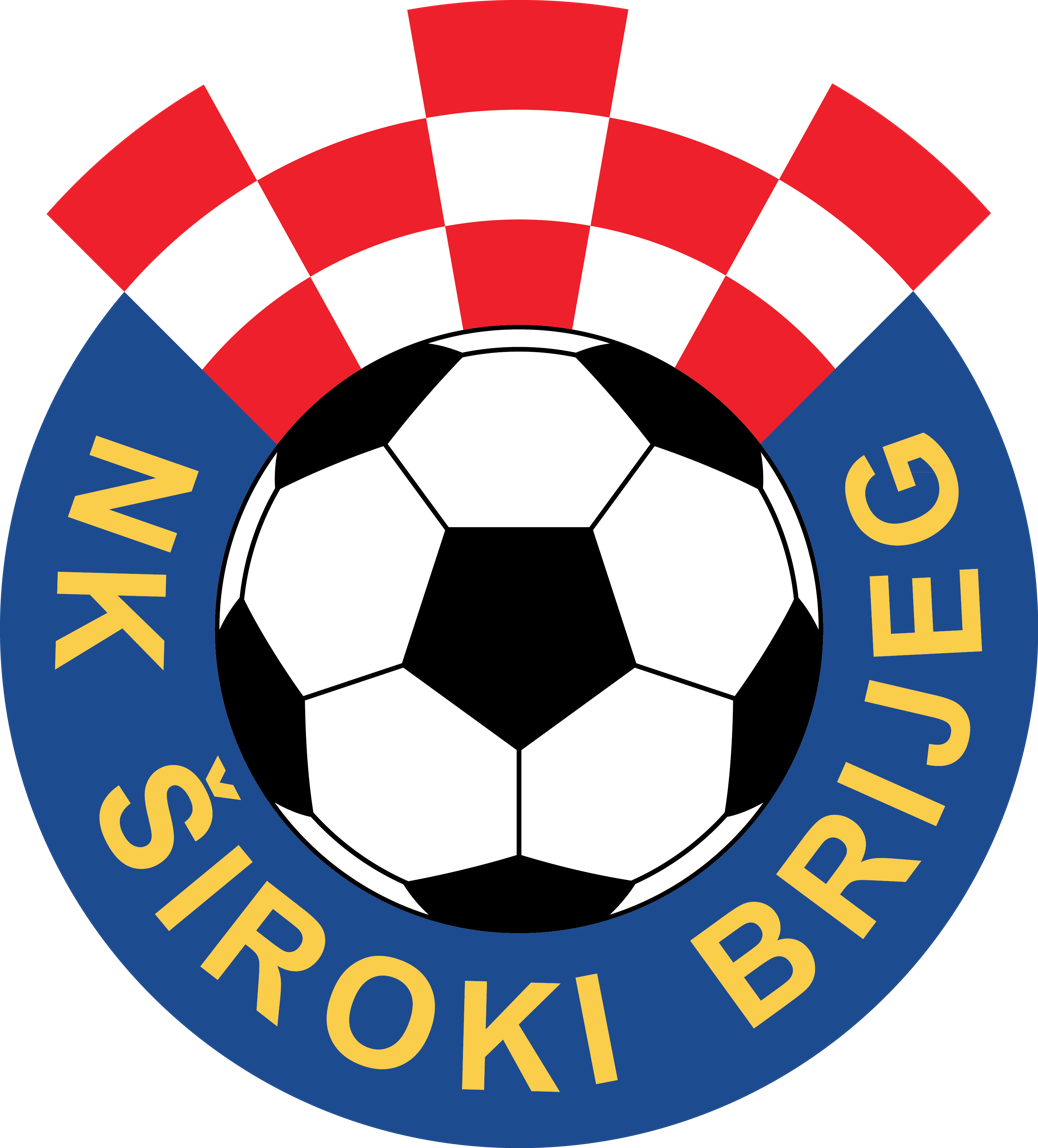
- Full name: Nogometni klub Široki Brijeg
- Nickname: Plavi (The Blues)
- Founded: 1948; 78 years ago
- Ground: Pecara Stadium, Široki Brijeg
- Capacity: 5,147
- Chairman: Miro Kraljević
- Manager: Marijo Tot
- League: Premier League BH
- 2025–26: Premier League BH, 5th of 10
- Website: www.nk-sirokibrijeg.com
Home colours	Away colours

Nogometni klub Široki Brijeg (English: Široki Brijeg Football Club) is a professional football club from the city of Široki Brijeg, that is situated in Bosnia and Herzegovina.

Currently, Široki Brijeg plays in the Premier League of Bosnia and Herzegovina and plays its home matches on Pecara Stadium which a capacity of 5,147 seats. The club also has a fully equipped sports and recreational center outside the town which is used as a training ground for the team.

== History ==
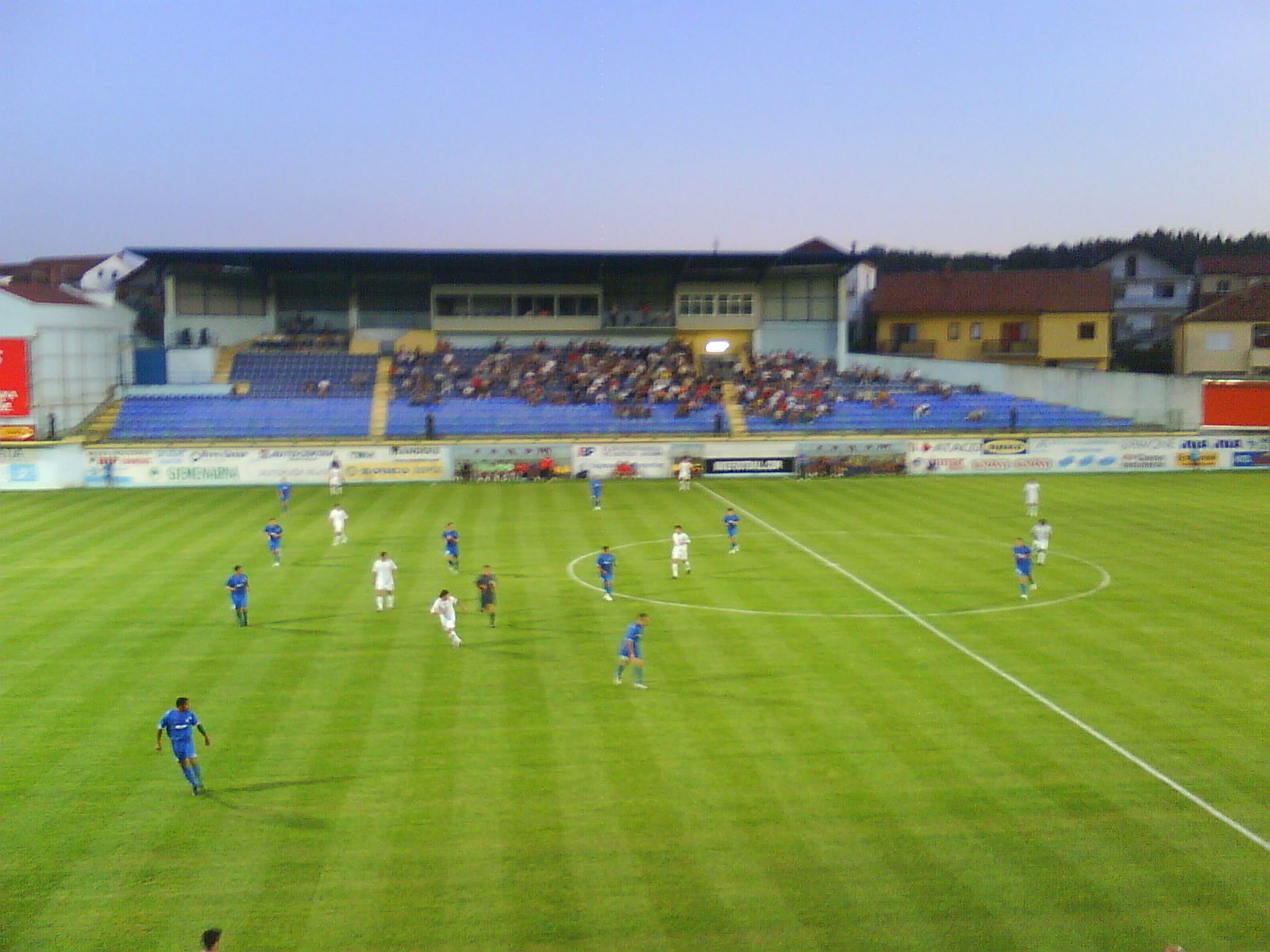
Široki Brijeg vs. FC Urartu on 9 July 2009

The club was founded in 1948 as Nogometni klub Borak and competed in local leagues. Until 1991, it competed in the Yugoslav league system under the name of NK Mladost Lištica.

The club was renamed several times until 1995 when it got its present-day name. Široki Brijeg experienced its greatest successes in the 1990s and onwards. The club has won the, now defunct, First League of Herzeg-Bosnia five times and is the most successful club of the competition. Since 2000, Široki Brijeg plays in the Premier League of Bosnia and Herzegovina, the country's top division, which they won two times, as well as three Bosnia and Herzegovina Football Cups.

Since 2002, the club has also, almost non stop been present in many UEFA competitions, most notably the UEFA Champions League and UEFA Europa League. However, Široki Brijeg still hasn't competed in the group stages of both mentioned competitions.

== Colours and badge ==
The club wears blue and white striped jerseys at home while away the team has a white kit. The club's crest features a football bordered by the club's name and topped with the Croatian chequy.

== Fans ==
Škripari is the organisation of football supporters of the Croat-backed club NK Široki Brijeg. They also support Široki Brijeg's other sport clubs, primarily HKK Široki in basketball.

Some ultras espouse nationalist and right-wing sentiments.

== Players ==
=== Current squad ===
As of 21 August 2026

Note: Flags indicate national team as defined under FIFA eligibility rules; some limited exceptions apply. Players may hold more than one non-FIFA nationality.

No.	Pos.	Nation	Player
2	DF	CRO	Mateo Barać
3	DF	BIH	Mateo Soldo
4	MF	BIH	Božo Prusina
5	DF	CRO	Bartul Markovina
6	MF	BIH	Antoni Bajkuša
7	FW	CRO	Dominik Simčić
8	MF	CRO	Mario Kordić-Gružić
9	FW	BRA	Luizinho Guedes
10	FW	BIH	Filip Matić
11	FW	ESP	David Virgili
12	GK	BIH	Ante Slišković
13	DF	CRO	Lukas Magđinski
14	DF	GER	Niko Vukančić
17	MF	CRO	Luka Romac
18	MF	BIH	Marko Matić

No.	Pos.	Nation	Player
19	MF	BIH	Filip Jelčić
23	DF	CRO	Ante Bolanča
26	DF	CRO	Marijan Oršolić
27	MF	BIH	Josip Skoko
29	DF	BIH	Matej Hrkać
30	DF	BIH	Ivan Kraljević
33	DF	BIH	Ivan Jelić
43	GK	CRO	Eugen Ciban
44	FW	CRO	Kristijan Sesar
47	DF	CRO	Ivan Krstanović (on loan from Hajduk Split)
51	GK	BIH	Ivan Puljić
77	MF	CRO	Robert Marijanović
80	FW	ESP	Mario Mourelo
90	MF	BIH	Tomislav Tomić (captain)

=== Out on loan ===
Note: Flags indicate national team as defined under FIFA eligibility rules; some limited exceptions apply. Players may hold more than one non-FIFA nationality.

No.	Pos.	Nation	Player
28	DF	BIH	Luka Perko (at Posušje until 30 June 2027)
—	FW	BIH	Nikola Marić (at Tomislav until 30 June 2027)

== Coaching staff ==
Staff	Title
(Croatia) Marijo Tot	Head coach
(Croatia) Jure Obšivač	Assistant coach
(Croatia) Stanko Bubalo	Assistant coach
(Bosnia and Herzegovina) Nenad Džidić	Goalkeeping coach
Vacant	Fitness coach
(Bosnia and Herzegovina) Dragan Mijatović	Physiotherapist
(Bosnia and Herzegovina) Grgo Sesar	Physiotherapist
(Bosnia and Herzegovina) Alen Brekalo	Doctor
(Bosnia and Herzegovina) Zoran Bilać	Kitman
(Bosnia and Herzegovina) Igor Lončar	Kitman

== Honours ==
Široki Brijeg has so far won two Premier League of Bosnia and Herzegovina titles as well as five First League of Herzeg-Bosnia championships that served as the top football league for Croat clubs in Bosnia and Herzegovina until the merger into the Premier League in 2000. The club has also won three Bosnia and Herzegovina Football Cup titles, the most recent one being in the 2016–17 season.

=== Domestic ===
==== League ====
- Premier League of Bosnia and Herzegovina:
  - Winners (2): 2003–04, 2005–06
  - Runners-up (5): 2001–02, 2007–08, 2009–10, 2011–12, 2013–14
- First League of Herzeg-Bosnia:
  - Winners (5): 1993–94, 1994–95, 1995–96, 1996–97, 1997–98
  - Runners-up (1): 1998–99

==== Cups ====
- Bosnia and Herzegovina Cup:
  - Winners (3): 2006–07, 2012–13, 2016–17
  - Runners-up (6): 2004–05, 2005–06, 2011–12, 2014–15, 2018–19, 2024–25
- Herzeg-Bosnia Cup:
  - Runners-up (3): 1995–96, 1997–98, 1998–99

== Club seasons ==
Season	League									Cup	European competitions	
Season	Division	P	W	D	L	F	A	Pts	Pos	Cup	European competitions	
2000–01	Premier League	42	18	11	13	72	43	65	7th	SF		
2001–02	Premier League	30	14	9	7	43	24	51	2nd	R2		
2002–03	Premier League	38	21	5	12	69	45	68	4th	R2	UEFA Cup	R1
2003–04	Premier League	30	19	4	7	58	32	61	1st	R1		
2004–05	Premier League	30	12	9	9	42	33	45	3rd	RU	Champions League	QR1
2005–06	Premier League	30	19	6	5	38	19	63	1st	RU	UEFA Cup	R1
2006–07	Premier League	30	13	6	11	39	32	45	4th	W	Champions League	QR2
2007–08	Premier League	30	17	3	10	44	29	54	2nd	QF	UEFA Cup	QR2
2008–09	Premier League	30	14	3	13	47	38	45	6th	SF	UEFA Cup	QR2
2009–10	Premier League	30	16	7	7	46	27	55	2nd	R2	Europa League	QR2
2010–11	Premier League	30	16	2	12	59	45	50	4th	SF	Europa League	QR2
2011–12	Premier League	30	18	9	3	48	17	63	2nd	RU	Europa League	QR1
2012–13	Premier League	30	13	6	11	48	31	45	6th	W	Europa League	QR2
2013–14	Premier League	30	17	8	5	66	23	59	2nd	SF	Europa League	QR3
2014–15	Premier League	30	15	11	4	46	23	56	4th	RU	Europa League	QR2
2015–16	Premier League	30	18	7	5	56	21	61	3rd	SF		
2016–17	Premier League	32	9	10	13	34	35	37	7th	W	Europa League	QR1
2017–18	Premier League	32	16	8	8	52	28	56	4th	QF	Europa League	QR2
2018–19	Premier League	33	13	15	5	37	23	54	3rd	RU	Europa League	QR1
2019–20	Premier League	22	8	8	6	31	26	32	7th	SF	Europa League	QR1
2020–21	Premier League	33	17	8	8	47	30	59	4th	QF		
2021–22	Premier League	33	8	15	10	31	35	39	7th	QF	Europa Conference League	QR1
2022–23	Premier League	33	13	9	11	38	36	48	5th	R2		
2023–24	Premier League	33	11	6	16	37	45	39	8th	SF		
2024–25	Premier League	33	13	7	13	43	46	46	5th	RU		
2025–26	Premier League	36	11	12	13	37	48	45	5th	R2		

== European record ==
=== Summary ===
Competition	Pld	W	D	L	GF	GA	Last season played
Champions League	6	3	1	2	4	5	2006–07
UEFA Cup / Europa League	48	15	10	23	57	74	2019–20
UEFA Europa Conference League	2	1	0	1	3	4	2021–22
Total	56	19	13	26	64	83	—

Source:, Last updated on 15 July 2021.
Pld = Matches played; W = Matches won; D = Matches drawn; L = Matches lost; GF = Goals for; GA = Goals against

=== By result ===
Overall	Pld	W	D	L	GF	GA	GD
Home	28	11	7	10	37	30	+7
Away	28	8	4	16	27	53	−26
Total	55	20	11	25	64	83	−19

Last updated: 15 July 2021.

=== By season ===
Season	Competition	Round	Opponent	Home	Away	Agg.
2002–03	UEFA Cup	QR	(Slovakia) Senec	3–0	2–1	5–1
2002–03	UEFA Cup	R1	(Czech Republic) Sparta Prague	0–1	0–3	0–4
2004–05	Champions League	QR1	(Azerbaijan) Neftçi	2–1	0–1	2–2 (a)
2005–06	UEFA Cup	QR1	(Albania) Teuta	3–0	1–3	4–3
2005–06	UEFA Cup	QR2	(Serbia and Montenegro) Zeta	4–2	1–0	5–2
2005–06	UEFA Cup	R1	(Switzerland) Basel	0–1	0–5	0–6
2006–07	Champions League	QR1	(Belarus) Shakhtyor Soligorsk	1–0	1–0	2–0
2006–07	Champions League	QR2	(Scotland) Heart of Midlothian	0–0	0–3	0–3
2007–08	UEFA Cup	QR1	(Slovenia) Koper	3–1	3–2	6–3
2007–08	UEFA Cup	QR2	(Israel) Hapoel Tel Aviv	0–3	0–3	0–6
2008–09	UEFA Cup	QR1	(Albania) Partizani	0–0	3–1	3–1
2008–09	UEFA Cup	QR2	(Turkey) Beşiktaş	1–2	0–4	1–6
2009–10	Europa League	QR1	(Armenia) Urartu	0–1	2–0	2–1
2009–10	Europa League	QR2	(Austria) Sturm Graz	1–1	1–2	2–3
2010–11	Europa League	QR1	(Slovenia) Olimpija Ljubljana	3–0	2–0	5–0
2010–11	Europa League	QR2	Austria Wien	0–1	2–2	2–3
2011–12	Europa League	QR1	(Slovenia) Olimpija Ljubljana	0–0	0–3	0–3
2012–13	Europa League	QR2	(Republic of Ireland) St Patrick's Athletic	1–1	1–2 (a.e.t.)	2–3
2013–14	Europa League	QR2	(Kazakhstan) Irtysh Pavlodar	2–0	2–3	4–3
2013–14	Europa League	QR3	(Italy) Udinese	1–3	0–4	1–7
2014–15	Europa League	QR1	(Azerbaijan) Gabala	3–0	2–0	5–0
2014–15	Europa League	QR2	(Czech Republic) Mladá Boleslav	0–4	1–2	1–6
2016–17	Europa League	QR1	(Malta) Birkirkara	1–1	0–2	1–3
2017–18	Europa League	QR1	(Kazakhstan) Ordabasy	2–0	0–0	2–0
2017–18	Europa League	QR2	(Scotland) Aberdeen	0–2	1–1	1–3
2018–19	Europa League	QR1	(Slovenia) Domžale	2−2	1–1	3–3 (a)
2019–20	Europa League	QR1	(Kazakhstan) Kairat	1–2	1–2	2–4
2021–22	Europa Conference League	QR1	(Albania) Vllaznia	3–1	0–3	3–4

== Club ranking ==
=== UEFA coefficient ===
==== 2020–21 season ====
Rank	Team	Points
340	(Northern Ireland) Coleraine	2.750
341	(San Marino) Tre Penne	2.750
342	(Estonia) Levadia Tallinn	2.750
343	(Bosnia and Herzegovina) Široki Brijeg	2.750
344	(Faroe Islands) Víkingur Gøta	2.750
345	(Slovakia) Žilina	2.725
346	(Slovakia) Spartak Myjava	2.725

As of 17 December 2020. Source

== Notable managers ==
Slaven Musa won the 2012–13 Bosnian Cup with Široki Brijeg.

Dates	Name	Honours
2002–2004	(Bosnia and Herzegovina) Ivo Ištuk	2003–04 Bosnian Championship
2004–2006	(Bosnia and Herzegovina) Ivica Barbarić	2005–06 Bosnian Championship
2006–2007	(Croatia) Ivica Kalinić	2006−07 Bosnian Cup
2012–2015	(Bosnia and Herzegovina) Slaven Musa	2012–13 Bosnian Cup
2017–2018	(Croatia) Goran Sablić	2016–17 Bosnian Cup
