= City Stadium SRC Slavija =

Stadium in Bosnia and Herzegovina

- Gradski SRC Slavija
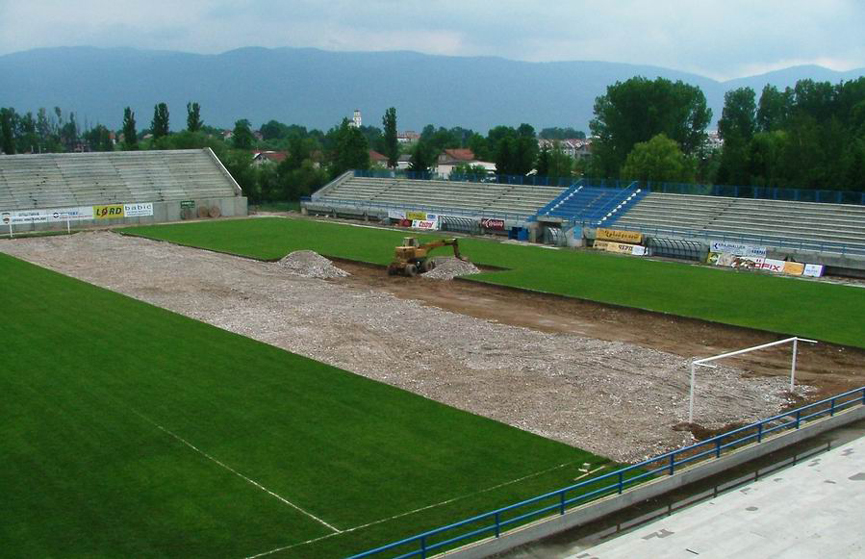
- The stadium's pitch being replaced in May 2004.
- Interactive map of City Stadium SRC Slavija
- Full name: City Stadium SRC Slavija
- Location: Istočno Sarajevo, Bosnia and Herzegovina
- Owner: FK Slavija Sarajevo
- Operator: FK Slavija Sarajevo
- Capacity: 6,000
- Surface: Grass
- Field size: 105×96 m

Construction
- Built: 1996
- Opened: 1996
- Renovated: 2004
- Expanded: 2008

Tenant
- FK Slavija Sarajevo

City Stadium SRC Slavija (Serbo-Croatian: Gradski stadion SRC Slavija, Стадион СРЦ Славија; ″SRC″ stands for Sportsko-rekreacioni centar, Спортско-рекреациони центар, 'Sports and Recreation Center'), is a multi-purpose stadium in Istočno Sarajevo, Republika Srpska, Bosnia and Herzegovina. It is currently used mostly for football matches and is the home ground of FK Slavija Sarajevo. The stadium has a capacity that can hold 6,000 people.
