= FK Slavija Sarajevo =

Association football club in Bosnia and Herzegovina

Slavija Sarajevo
- Full name: Fudbalski klub Slavija Sarajevo
- Nickname: Sokolovi (Falcons)
- Founded: 1908; 118 years ago
- Ground: Gradski SRC Slavija, Istočno Sarajevo
- Capacity: 6,000
- President: Zdravko Šavija
- Manager: Milan Muminović
- League: First League of RS
- 2025–26: First League of RS, 6th of 13
Home colours	Away colours

Fudbalski klub Slavija Sarajevo (Serbian Cyrillic: Фудбалски клуб Славија Сарајево) is a professional association football club from the city of Istočno Sarajevo, Republika Srpska that is situated in Bosnia and Herzegovina. Slavija Sarajevo is a member of the Football Association of Republika Srpska and the Football Association of Bosnia and Herzegovina and it is active in the First League of the Republika Srpska. The club's home stadium is Gradski SRC Slavija Stadium, which has a capacity of 6,000 seats.

Dominantly the club of Serbs, Slavija was by far the most successful club from Bosnia and Herzegovina during the interbellum, having played 11 top league seasons (out of possible 16) in the Kingdom of Serbs, Croats and Slovenes and Kingdom of Yugoslavia.

== History ==
Founded in Sarajevo during 1908 when the city was part of Austria-Hungary, the football club was part of the wider sports society of Sarajevo gymnasium students informally known as Đački sportski klub (ĐSK) or Srednjoškolski sportski klub (SSK). Since cultural and social activities in the city in those days mostly revolved around Hotel Evropa and the gymnasium, the idea of establishing a sporting club was initiated on those premises. Some of the students earlier that year visited Zagreb, where they got introduced to the game of football, bringing back the first ball to Sarajevo. Notable individuals who organized club activities in this early period were students Zdravko Jeftanović (son of the Hotel Evropa owner dr. Dušan Jeftanović), Feodor Lukač, Emil Najšul, Sveto Gerovac, Stevo Jokanović, etc. Their early activities were very sporadic and basically clandestine as Austro-Hungarian occupational authorities that just annexed Bosnia instituted a ban on any kind of organized gathering.

In early 1909, the football section got its first pairs of boots and started holding regular practices and training sessions at Sarajevo Polje grounds, more precisely the military workout open facility known as Egzercir in the Čengić vila area. Since the open field didn't have any goalposts, the students had to haul them in on foot from the city for every practice and match. ĐSK/SSK also informally took red and white as club colours after Slavia Prague, the club that served as inspiration for Slavs throughout Austria-Hungary. Austrian international striker, Karl Harmer, came from Vienna to become the team's first manager.

=== 1910s ===
It wasn't until 1911 that ĐSK played its debut match, defeating a selection of Vienna soldiers 4–2.

Throughout 1912, ĐSK played friendlies in parts of Austria-Hungary populated by South Slavs. First such trip outside of Sarajevo was to the city of Split where ĐSK played local side Hajduk. The first match took place on 7 April 1912 and Hajduk won, 4–1. A day later on 8 April, the teams played another match with ĐSK winning this time, 2–1. Curiosity from the Split visit was that posters announcing the two matches around the city billed ĐSK as "Osman" for non-specified reasons. This probably stemmed from the fact that "ĐSK" as club name was informally used even amongst its players so the Split hosts decided to make up a name for their guests' club on the spot. They seemingly found the male Muslim name Osman to be sufficiently funny and decided to print it on the posters as the club's official name.

From the fall of 1912 as the first of eventually two Balkan Wars started raging nearby, just beyond the Austria-Hungary's eastern borders, ĐSK naturally began fostering Pan-Slavic sentiment, and especially the Yugoslav idea (unification of South Slavs), even harder as national and political aspects of club's activities came to the forefront. While the Balkan League member states (Serbia, Greece, Bulgaria, and Montenegro) were getting rid of the last remains of Ottoman influence, Slavs within the borders of Austria-Hungary were restless to make some dents in the armour of their own occupiers – the Austro-Hungarian empire. By mid-1913, the Balkan Wars were over with a resounding victory for Slavs (Serbs and Montenegrins) across the border on the other side of river Drina. This had an enormously encouraging effect on Slavs (especially Serbs) in Bosnia. Austro-Hungarian authorities were not oblivious to such developments and their repression got stepped up even further. All of this led to increased tensions and boiling pot atmosphere in the city of Sarajevo.

During the second part of 1913, an ethnic split occurred within the ĐSK organization as a certain number of members (all of them ethnic Croats) left ĐSK to form Hrvatski sportski klub, which later became SAŠK. However, most others stayed at the club and soon changed the ĐSK's name to Srpski sportski klub (SSK). The freshly renamed entity attempted to make its existence public and official, and to that end enlisted its connections through Dušan Jeftanović, a prominent local industrialist and landowner, and Jovo Šošić. However, Austro-Hungarian authorities wouldn't give an inch—the ban on organized gathering stayed firmly in place. The difficult situation that the club found itself in made its members pull together even harder and by the end of 1913 they built a home ground located at Čurčić Vila in Koševo neighbourhood. However, they wouldn't get to enjoy their new home for long.

The assassination of Archduke Franz Ferdinand by Gavrilo Princip in June 1914 set off a chain of events such as the Austrian July Ultimatum to Serbia, the subsequent Austro-Hungarian declaration of war on Serbia and the eventual outbreak of World War I. The position of Serbs in Bosnia became increasingly difficult. SSK members were no exception as many of them got arrested or forcibly conscripted to fight in the Austro-Hungarian Army. The newly built ground at Čurčić Vila got ransacked and burned by an angry mob of Croats and Bosniaks.

Football quickly became an afterthought and SSK was completely inactive all throughout World War I. After the end of war and the creation of Kingdom of Serbs, Croats and Slovenes, SSK reactivated in 1919.

=== 1920s ===
In 1921, SSK changed its name to SK Slavija and competed in the top level of the Sarajevo Subassociation. Over the next few years Slavija built a 4,000-capacity stadium in Marijin Dvor area of Sarajevo. In line with its student background the club devoted its potential to developing young players.

Slavija's first appearance in the Kingdom's top football competition took place in 1924. It featured only seven clubs and was played in cup system. Slavija didn't have luck cause they got as opponents in the quarterfinal Belgrade's SK Jugoslavija, which crashed them 2–5 and later became champions that season.

=== 1930s ===
The 1930 season saw the return to top flight that now featured six clubs and was played in league system. Slavija finished the season in 5th place with 2 wins, 2 draws, and 6 losses, all of which wasn't enough to avoid the drop.

Next chance for top flight football came in 1932–33 season. By then the competition changed format once more as it was now played in fall-spring league rhythm and expanded to 11 clubs. Slavija finished 9th in the league with 7 wins, 2 draws, and 11 losses, which was just enough to stay afloat.

Football was not played in Kingdom of Yugoslavia during 1933–34 season, so the next opportunity came in 1934–35. The league now featured 10 teams, and Slavija again barely avoided relegation, finishing third from the bottom with 7 wins, 1 draw, and 10 losses.

The 1935–36 season finally provided a much sought breakthrough for Slavija as the club came within a hair of becoming the champion of Yugoslavia. The top league now featured 14 clubs, most ever in its history up to that point. Another change was that the home-and-away cup system was brought back. Led by Milan Rajlić and Slavko Zagorac on the pitch, and Risto Šošić from the bench, Slavija first came up against Cetinje's Crnogorac, beating them 5–4 on aggregate. Next up was Građanski from Skopje in the quarter-finals – after losing the first game 1–2, Slavija recorded a famous 10–1 win in the return leg. This momentum carried into the semi-finals against Novi Sad's NAK as Slavija progressed 4–2 on aggregate. That set the stage for the famous two-legged final against the powerhouse BSK team. First leg finished 1–1, but BSK prevailed 0–1 in return.

The competition for the 1936–37 returned to 10 clubs and league system. Encouraged by their previous season's historic runner-up success, Slavija entered the new campaign with high hopes. They were soon dashed, however, as the club recorded 7 wins, 3 draws, and 8 losses, which was enough for a mid-table 5th-place finish.

The next season was virtually identical with 7 wins, 4 draws, and 7 losses that again translated to 5th place in the table. A small consolation was that this was the first time season played in the league system that Slavija didn't have more losses than wins.

In 1940, the club participated at the 1940 Mitropa Cup which ended up abandoned due to the beginning of the war. Slavija lost in the quarter-finals to Ferencvaros in a dramatic 11–1 comeback from the Hungarians in Budapest, after losing to Slavija by 3–0 in Sarajevo in the first round. Slavija was led by the notable Hungarian manager Wilmos Wilhelm.

Once again just like in World War I, following the Nazi Germany invasion of Kingdom of Yugoslavia the club was inactive until the end of World War II in the Balkans. After the war, SK Slavija was disbanded without any explanation by the new communist authorities. Its stadium at Marijin Dvor was renamed "Šesti april" and used for home matches of FK Željezničar and newly formed SD Torpedo. The stadium was eventually torn down while its stands and bleachers were given to FK Željezničar for use in their Grbavica ground that was under construction.

=== Rebirth ===
In 1993, after the break-up of SFR Yugoslavia and the formation of the Football Association of Republika Srpska, FK Slavija was re-formed. In 1996, because of its pre-war tradition, it was decided that the club would become part of the newly formed First League of Republika Srpska. Slavija finished eighth at the end of the season; however, because of the restructuring of the league system, they would compete in the Second League of Republika Srpska for the following seasons, returning in 2000. In that season, Slavija won the 1999–00 Second League of RS unbeatable, with 19 wins and 2 draws, and a 73–6 goal difference. Slavija played in the First League of RS until 2004 when they became league champions and earned promotion to the Premier League of Bosnia and Herzegovina. In 2004, the club reached the semi-finals of the Bosnian Cup for the third time. Since then, the club has become a regular participant in the Premier League, having in between celebrated its centennial in 2008.

== Supporters ==
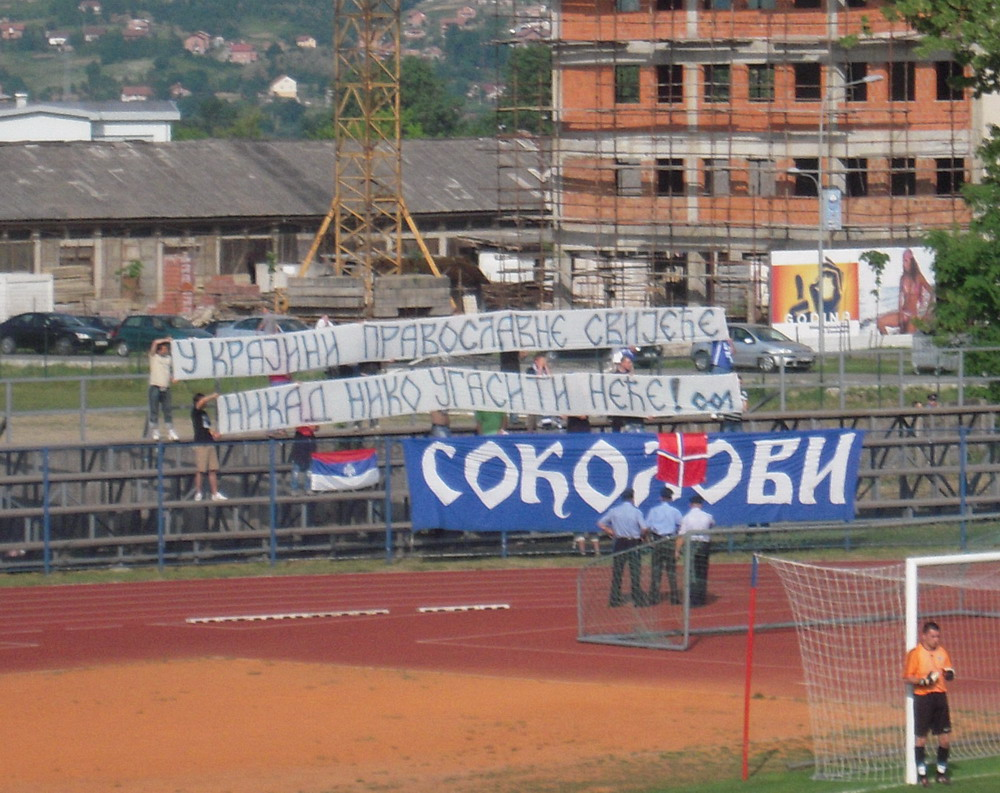
Slavija's main supporter group Sokolovi in May 2009.

The organized supporters of the club are known as Sokolovi (The Falcons).

== Honours ==
=== Domestic ===
==== League ====
- Yugoslav First League:
  - Runners-up (1): 1935–36
- Premier League of Bosnia and Herzegovina:
  - Runners-up (1): 2008–09
- First League of the Republika Srpska:
  - Winners (1): 2003–04

==== Cups ====
- Bosnia and Herzegovina Cup:
  - Winners (1): 2008–09
  - Runners-up (1): 2006–07
- Republika Srpska Cup:
  - Winners (2): 2005–06, 2007–08

== European record ==
As of 6 August 2009

Competition	P	W	D	L	GF	GA	GD
UEFA Intertoto Cup / UEFA Europa League	8	3	2	3	10	13	−3
Total	8	3	2	3	10	13	–3

P = Matches played; W = Matches won; D = Matches drawn; L = Matches lost; GF = Goals for; GA = Goals against; GD = Goals difference. Defunct competitions indicated in italics.

=== List of matches ===
Season	Competition	Round		Club	Home	Away	Agg.
2007	UEFA Intertoto Cup	1R	(Andorra)	Sant Julià	3–2	3–2	6–4
		2R	(Romania)	Oțelul Galați	0–0	0–3	0–3
2009–10	UEFA Europa League	2Q	(Denmark)	Aalborg	3–1	0–0	3–1
		3Q	(Slovakia)	MFK Košice	0–2	1–3	1–5

== Players ==
=== Current squad ===
As of 23 May 2023

Note: Flags indicate national team as defined under FIFA eligibility rules; some limited exceptions apply. Players may hold more than one non-FIFA nationality.

No.	Pos.	Nation	Player
1	GK	BIH	Nino Nedzibović
2	MF	BIH	Petar Dabić
3	MF	BIH	Slobodan Vucinić
4	DF	BIH	Dejan Djerić
5	DF	BIH	Amar Besirević
6	DF	BIH	Goran Popović
7	FW	BIH	Stefan Arbinja
8	MF	BIH	Vasilije Gojković
10	MF	BIH	Nikola Bjelos
11	MF	BIH	Denis Bogucanin

No.	Pos.	Nation	Player
14	MF	BIH	Djordje Avdalović
15	MF	BIH	Hamza Kaljić
16	MF	SRB	Tadija Stojanović
17	DF	BIH	Vladan Mandić
18	FW	BIH	Luka Asentić
19	MF	BIH	Danijel Erić
20	MF	BIH	Nemanja Cvoro
23	GK	BIH	Amar Sirco
25	DF	BIH	Sergej Tomić

=== Notable former players ===
These players played in the club and have played in national teams:

Pre-1945 period:

- (Austria) Karl Harmer
- (Kingdom of Yugoslavia) Florijan Matekalo
- (Kingdom of Yugoslavia) Milan Rajlić
- (Kingdom of Yugoslavia) Branko Stanković
- (Kingdom of Yugoslavia) Slavko Zagorac

Post-1945 period:

- (Bosnia and Herzegovina) Velibor Đurić
- (Bosnia and Herzegovina) Vlastimir Jovanović
- (Bosnia and Herzegovina) Ilija Prodanović
- (Bosnia and Herzegovina) Bojan Regoje
- (Bosnia and Herzegovina) Zoran Kokot
- (China) Dai Lin
- (North Macedonia) Ostoja Stjepanović
- (Serbia) Dimitrije Injac
- (Federal Republic of Yugoslavia) Goran Trobok

== Managers ==
- (Austria) Karl Harmer (1908–1911)
- (Hungary) Toni Szabó (1924–19xx)
- (Austria) Hans Ringer (1934–1935)
- (Kingdom of Yugoslavia) Risto Šošić (1935–1937)
- (Kingdom of Yugoslavia) Brana Porobić (1937–1938)
- (Austria) Franz Unschuld (1938–1939)
- (Austria) Walter Kolitsch (1939–1940)
- (Hungary) Vilmos Wilheim (1940)
- (Bosnia and Herzegovina) Nedeljko Bugarin
- (Bosnia and Herzegovina) Slobodan Lubura
- (Bosnia and Herzegovina) Zoran Šumar
- (Bosnia and Herzegovina) Bojan Miličević
- (Bosnia and Herzegovina) Duško Petrović
- (Bosnia and Herzegovina) Ranko Mrkajić
- (Bosnia and Herzegovina) Milomir Šešlija (20 March 2002 – 13 June 2003)
- (Bosnia and Herzegovina) Milomir Odović (3 June 2005 – 20 August 2007)
- (Bosnia and Herzegovina) Mirko Marvan (21 August 2007 – 7 April 2008)
- (Bosnia and Herzegovina) Zoran Erbez (8 April 2008 – 20 September 2009)
- (Bosnia and Herzegovina) Milomir Odović (21 September 2009 – 4 May 2010)
- (Montenegro) Dušan Jevrić (5 May 2010 – 1 August 2010)
- (Bosnia and Herzegovina) Dragan Bjelica (7 August 2010 – 12 September 2011)
- (Bosnia and Herzegovina) Aleksandar Simić (interim) (12 September 2011 – 23 September 2011)
- (Bosnia and Herzegovina) Zoran Erbez (23 September 2011 – 1 January 2012)
- (Bosnia and Herzegovina) Milan Gutović (17 January 2012 – 20 March 2012)
- (Bosnia and Herzegovina) Vlado Čapljić (20 March 2012 – 29 November 2012)
- (Bosnia and Herzegovina) Milomir Šešlija (5 January 2013 – 6 July 2013)
- (Bosnia and Herzegovina) Dragan Radović (7 July 2013 – 31 October 2013)
- (Serbia) Slaviša Božičić (13 November 2013 – 31 March 2014)
- (Bosnia and Herzegovina) Milan Gutović (21 February 2015 – 11 August 2015)
- (Bosnia and Herzegovina) Darko Vojvodić (19 August 2015 – 8 December 2015)
- (Serbia) Veljko Dovedan (21 February 2016 – 22 March 2016)
- (North Macedonia) Milko Djurovski (30 March 2016 – 16 May 2016)
- (Bosnia and Herzegovina) Branislav Berjan (1 July 2016 – 19 September 2016)
- (Bosnia and Herzegovina) Milomir Odović (22 September 2016 – 28 May 2017)
- (Bosnia and Herzegovina) Dragan Radović (12 July 2017 – 2 April 2018)
- (Bosnia and Herzegovina) Dragan Bjelica (18 April 2018 – 11 November 2018)
- (Bosnia and Herzegovina) Milan Gutović (26 January 2019 – 1 June 2020)
- (Bosnia and Herzegovina) Zoran Erbez (2 July 2020 – 5 April 2021)
- (Bosnia and Herzegovina) Bojan Regoje (interim) (6 April 2021 – 30 June 2021)
- (Bosnia and Herzegovina) Bojan Regoje (1 July 2021 – 1 April 2024)
- (Bosnia and Herzegovina) Momčilo Stanić (1 April 2024 – 10 June 2024)
- (Bosnia and Herzegovina) Milan Muminović (25 June 2024 – present)
