= 2013 Bosnia and Herzegovina Football Cup final =

- Event: 2012–13 Bosnia and Herzegovina Football Cup
Željezničar	Široki Brijeg
2	2
- Široki Brijeg won 5–4 on penalties

First leg
Željezničar	Široki Brijeg
1	1
- Date: 18:00, 30 April 2012 (+02:00)
- Venue: Grbavica, Sarajevo
- Referee: Tomislav Čuić (Tomislavgrad)
- Attendance: 4,300
- Weather: Sunny and clear

Second leg
Široki Brijeg	Željezničar
1	1
- Date: 19:00, 14 May 2012 (+02:00)
- Venue: Pecara, Široki Brijeg
- Referee: Edin Jakupović (Bihać)
- Attendance: 3,500
- Weather: Sunny and clear

The 2013 Bosnia and Herzegovina Football Cup final was the 18th final of the Bosnia and Herzegovina Football Cup, the highest football cup competition in Bosnia.

The date of both 2013 Final matches, as in all the recent years, was set so that it avoids clashes with Premier League of Bosnia and Herzegovina fixtures. Both matches took place on Tuesday, between two rounds of the Premier League of Bosnia and Herzegovina.

The current holders, Željezničar were not able to defend their title with Široki Brijeg bringing a trophy home after six years of drought after they won 5–4 on penalties (both legs finished 1–1).

== Route to the Final ==
Note: In all results below, the score of the finalist is given first.

Željezničar				Round	Široki Brijeg			
Opponent	Result			Knockout phase	Opponent	Result		
Sloboda (MG)	3–0			Round of 32	Branitelj	2–0		
Opponent	Agg.	1st leg	2nd leg	Knockout phase	Opponent	Agg.	1st leg	2nd leg
Slavija	6–1	1–3 (A)	3–0 (H)	Round of 16	Orašje	7–0	0–6 (A)	1–0 (H)
Olimpic	4–0	0–1 (A)	3–0 (H)	Quarter-finals	Čelik	2–2; 5–4 pen.	1–1 (H)	1–1 (A)
Zrinjski	2–0	0–0 (H)	0–2 (A)	Semi-finals	Sloga	8–2	2–4 (A)	4–0 (H)

== Pre-match ==
This final marked the ninth appearance in final of Bosnia and Herzegovina Football Cup for Željezničar and tenth final in domestic cups, since they were once in final of Yugoslav Cup. They had won the cup five times (in 2000, 2001, 2003, 2011 and 2012) and have been beaten in 4 occasions (in 1981, 1997, 2002 and 2010). On the other side, this was the fifth final for Široki Brijeg and they won it once (in 2007), with three finals lost (in 2005, 2006 and 2012). This was the second consecutive time these two clubs met each other in the final of this competition, while it was the sixth overall encounter in this competition (they met each other before once in final, three times in semi-finals and once in quarter-finals).

On 9 April 2013, a draw to decide who will be the first host was held with Željezničar hosting the first leg on 30 April at 18:00 CEST and Široki Brijeg the rematch two weeks later on 14 May at 19:00 CEST, with both matches aired on BHT1. Unlike the two last finals, in which Željezničar also played, this time the ticket price wasn't raised but rather remained the same as the prices for the regular tickets for the league matches, which were €2.50 for the south stand (the stand were The Maniacs are), €4 for the north stand and €5 for the west stand.

The kick-off for the second leg was set at 19:00 CEST, on Tuesday, 14 May. Before the match, Željezničar was in a more-than-four-year unbeaten streak in national cup, with the last lost match dating to 24 September 2008 against Zvijezda in the first round of the 2008–09 Bosnia and Herzegovina Football Cup. Since then, they have played 35 matches in the national cup, winning in 22 of those matches and drawing 13, with a goal difference of 61 to 10. They won three of the last four national cups, since they lost the final in 2009–10 Bosnia and Herzegovina Football Cup to Borac on an aggregate score of 3:3 after two draw matches. Borac won the cup because of more scored away goals.

== Matches ==
=== Report for the first leg ===
==== Details for the first leg ====
30 April 2013
18:00 CEST

Željezničar	1 – 1	Široki Brijeg
E. Čolić	Report	Kordić

Stadion Grbavica, Sarajevo
Attendance: 4,300
Referee: Tomislav Čuić (Tomislavgrad)

Željezničar	Široki Brijeg

GK	30	(Croatia) Marijan Antolović
RB	85	(North Macedonia) Yani Urdinov	(yellow card) 46'
CB	5	(Bosnia and Herzegovina) Semir Kerla
CB	19	(Bosnia and Herzegovina) Velibor Vasilić
LB	17	(Bosnia and Herzegovina) Benjamin Čolić
DM	25	(Bosnia and Herzegovina) Tomislav Tomić
DM	23	(Bosnia and Herzegovina) Muamer Svraka (c)	(yellow card) 28'
AM	16	(Bosnia and Herzegovina) Vernes Selimović		(substituted off) 83'
RW	2	(Bosnia and Herzegovina) Elvir Čolić
LW	24	(Bosnia and Herzegovina) Nermin Jamak		(substituted off) 67'
CF	9	(Bosnia and Herzegovina) Eldin Adilović
Substitutes:
GK	22	(Bosnia and Herzegovina) Semir Bukvić
DF	?
MF	?
MF	90	(Bosnia and Herzegovina) Samir Bekrić		(substituted on) 83'
MF	?
FW	15	(Bosnia and Herzegovina) Armin Hodžić		(substituted on) 67'
FW	?
Manager:
(Bosnia and Herzegovina) Amar Osim

GK	12	(Bosnia and Herzegovina) Luka Bilobrk
RB	6	(Croatia) Mateo Bertoša
CB	8	(Croatia) Vedran Ješe
CB	3	(Croatia) Ivica Džidić
LB	16	(Bosnia and Herzegovina) Dino Ćorić
DM	20	(Bosnia and Herzegovina) Mirko Marić	(substituted off) 55'
DM	18	(Bosnia and Herzegovina) Jure Ivanković	(substituted off) 88'
AM	19	(Croatia) Mateo Roskam
RW	21	(Bosnia and Herzegovina) Damir Zlomislić
LW	15	(Brazil) Wagner Santos Lago
CF	9	(Bosnia and Herzegovina) Krešimir Kordić (c)	(substituted off) 90'
Substitutes:
GK	1	(Croatia) Nikola Marić
DF	?
DF	?
MF	22	(Bosnia and Herzegovina) Zvonimir Kožulj	(substituted on) 55'
MF	?
MF	14	(Bosnia and Herzegovina) Davor Landeka	(substituted on) 88'
FW	24	(Croatia) Ivan Barišić	(substituted on) 90'
Manager:
(Bosnia and Herzegovina) Slaven Musa

Assistant referees:
Sreten Udovičić (Prijedor)
Senad Ibrišimbegović (Travnik)
Fourth official:
Edin Jakupović (Bihać)
Additional assistant referees:
Vladimir Bjelica (I. Sarajevo)
Muamer Bureković (Zenica)

Match rules

- 90 minutes.
- Penalty shoot-out if scores still level; no extra time.
- Seven named substitutes.
- Maximum of three substitutions.

==== Statistics for first leg ====
	Željezničar	Široki Brijeg
Total shots		
Shots on target		
Ball possession	%	%
Corner kicks		
Fouls committed		
Offsides		
Yellow cards		
Red cards		

=== Report for the second leg ===
==== Details for the second leg ====
1 May 2013
19:00 CEST

Široki Brijeg	1 – 1	Željezničar
Wagner 63'	Report	Pehilj 90'
Penalties
Šilić (penalty scored); Kordić (penalty scored); Wagner (penalty scored); Ješe (penalty missed); Zlomislić (penalty missed); I. Džidić (penalty scored); Landeka (penalty scored)	5 – 4	(penalty missed) Pehilj; (penalty missed) Adilović; (penalty scored) Čolić; (penalty scored) Stanić; (penalty scored) Hasanović; (penalty scored) Smajić; (penalty missed) Svraka

Stadion Pecara, Široki Brijeg
Attendance: 3,500
Referee: Edin Jakupović (Bihać)

Široki Brijeg	Željezničar

GK	12	(Bosnia and Herzegovina) Luka Bilobrk
RB	6	(Croatia) Mateo Bertoša	(yellow card) 25'
CB	8	(Croatia) Vedran Ješe
CB	3	(Croatia) Ivica Džidić
LB	16	(Bosnia and Herzegovina) Dino Ćorić		(substituted off) 82'
DM	20	(Bosnia and Herzegovina) Mario Ljubić	(yellow card) 86'
DM	18	(Bosnia and Herzegovina) Jure Ivanković		(substituted off) 90'
AM	19	(Croatia) Mateo Roskam		(substituted off) 55'
RW	21	(Bosnia and Herzegovina) Damir Zlomislić	(yellow card) 65'
LW	15	(Brazil) Wagner Santos Lago
CF	9	(Bosnia and Herzegovina) Krešimir Kordić (c)
Substitutes:
GK	1	(Croatia) Nikola Marić
DM	?	Marković
DF	5	(Bosnia and Herzegovina) Slavko Brekalo
MF	22	(Bosnia and Herzegovina) Dalibor Šilić		(substituted on) 90'
MF	24	(Croatia) Ante Serdarušić		(substituted on) 82'
MF	14	(Bosnia and Herzegovina) Davor Landeka		(substituted on) 55'
FW	24	(Croatia) Ivan Barišić
Manager:
(Bosnia and Herzegovina) Slaven Musa

GK	30	(Croatia) Marijan Antolović
RB	11	(Bosnia and Herzegovina) Srđan Stanić
CB	6	(Bosnia and Herzegovina) Jadranko Bogičević
CB	19	(Bosnia and Herzegovina) Velibor Vasilić	(yellow card) 87'
LB	17	(Bosnia and Herzegovina) Benjamin Čolić
DM	25	(Bosnia and Herzegovina) Tomislav Tomić		(substituted off) 83'
DM	23	(Bosnia and Herzegovina) Muamer Svraka (c)
AM	16	(Bosnia and Herzegovina) Vernes Selimović		(substituted off) 68'
RW	2	(Bosnia and Herzegovina) Elvir Čolić
LW	24	(Bosnia and Herzegovina) Nermin Jamak		(substituted off) 83'
CF	9	(Bosnia and Herzegovina) Eldin Adilović
Substitutes:
GK	22	(Bosnia and Herzegovina) Semir Bukvić
DF	5	(Bosnia and Herzegovina) Semir Kerla
DF	85	(North Macedonia) Yani Urdinov
MF	7	(Bosnia and Herzegovina) Sulejman Smajić		(substituted on) 68'
MF	18	(Bosnia and Herzegovina) Josip Čutuk
MF	44	(Bosnia and Herzegovina) Eldar Hasanović		(substituted on) 83'
FW	29	(Bosnia and Herzegovina) Šaban Pehilj		(substituted on) 83'
Manager:
(Bosnia and Herzegovina) Amar Osim

Assistant referees:
Adnan Alispahić (Zenica)
Željko Marić (Doboj)
Fourth official:
Tomislav Čuić (Duvno)
Additional assistant referees:
Darko Obradović (Stolac)
Goran Parađik (Ljubuški)

Match rules

- 90 minutes.
- Penalty shoot-out if scores still level; no extra time.
- Seven named substitutes.
- Maximum of three substitutions.

==== Statistics for second leg ====
	Široki Brijeg	Željezničar
Total shots		
Shots on target		
Ball possession	%	%
Corner kicks		
Fouls committed		
Offsides		
Yellow cards		
Red cards		

== See also ==
- 2012–13 Bosnia and Herzegovina Football Cup
- 2012–13 Premier League of Bosnia and Herzegovina
- 2012 Bosnia and Herzegovina Football Cup Final
- Football Federation of Bosnia and Herzegovina
