= 2011–12 FK Željezničar season =

Željezničar
2011–12 season
- President: Sabahudin Žujo
- Manager: Amar Osim
- Stadium: Grbavica Stadium
- Premijer Liga BiH: Winner
- Kup BiH: Winner
- UEFA Europa League: Third qualifying round
- Top goalscorer: League: Eldin Adilović (19); All: Eldin Adilović (21)
- Highest home attendance: 39,000
- Lowest home attendance: 16,000
| Home colours | Away colours |

FK Željezničar's 2011–12 season was their 14th successive season in the Premier League of Bosnia and Herzegovina which saw Željezničar win the league title for the 5th time.

The 2011–12 season was ultimately very successful for the club as they won the Bosnian "double," winning the title and the Bosnian cup over NK Široki Brijeg. It was one of the best seasons in the club's history, including setting the league record for points with three games to play, having an over 30-game undefeated streak, and defeating every other team in the league at least once except Zrijnski, whom they drew with twice.

During the season, the club also started publishing an official club magazine.

== Statistics 2011–12 ==
=== Squad information ===
| N | Pos. | Nat. | Name | Age | EU | Since | App | Goals | Ends | Transfer fee | Notes |
|---|---|---|---|---|---|---|---|---|---|---|---|
| 1 | GK | (Bosnia and Herzegovina) | Adnan Gušo | 50 | Non-EU | 2008 | 29 | 0 | — | — | Originally from youth system |
| 2 | DF | (Bosnia and Herzegovina) | Elvir Čolić | 40 | EU | 2010 | 11 | 0 | 2012 | Free | Second nationality: Slovenia |
| 3 | DF | (Bosnia and Herzegovina) | Josip Kvesić | 35 | Non-EU | 2011 | 35 | 1 | 2013 | Free | Second nationality: Croatia |
| 4 | DF | (Montenegro) | Goran Marković | 40 | Non-EU | 2010 | 7 | 0 | 2012 | Free | |
| 5 | DF | (Bosnia and Herzegovina) | Semir Kerla | 38 | Non-EU | 2012 | 7 | 0 | 2014 | Free | |
| 6 | DF | (Bosnia and Herzegovina) | Jadranko Bogičević | 43 | Non-EU | 2010 | 38 | 4 | 2013 | Free | |
| 8 | MF | (Bosnia and Herzegovina) | Nermin Zolotić | 32 | Non-EU | 2010 | 14 | 0 | 2012 | Youth system | |
| 9 | FW | (Bosnia and Herzegovina) | Eldin Adilović | 40 | Non-EU | 2011 | 39 | 21 | 2013 | Free | |
| 10 | MF | (Bosnia and Herzegovina) | Zajko Zeba | 43 | Non-EU | 2010 | 41 | 10 | 2015 | Free | Originally from youth system |
| 11 | MF | (Bosnia and Herzegovina) | Srđan Stanić | 37 | Non-EU | 2007 | 24 | 0 | 2012 | Youth system | Second nationality: Croatia |
| 12 | GK | (Bosnia and Herzegovina) | Elvis Karić | 46 | Non-EU | 2010 | 11 | 0 | 2012 | Free | |
| 13 | MF | (Bosnia and Herzegovina) | Haris Hajradinović | 32 | Non-EU | 2012 | 1 | 0 | — | Youth system | |
| 14 | FW | (Bosnia and Herzegovina) | Mirsad Ramić | 33 | Non-EU | 2011 | 17 | 1 | 2014 | Youth system | |
| 15 | DF | (Liberia) | Nyema Gerhardt | 41 | EU | 2011 | 35 | 2 | 2012 | Free | Second nationality: Switzerland |
| 16 | FW | (Bosnia and Herzegovina) | Vernes Selimović | 43 | Non-EU | 2011 | 35 | 10 | 2013 | Free | |
| 17 | DF | (Bosnia and Herzegovina) | Benjamin Čolić | 35 | Non-EU | 2009 | 33 | 0 | 2012 | Youth system | |
| 18 | DF | (Bosnia and Herzegovina) | Josip Ćutuk | 41 | Non-EU | 2012 | 4 | 0 | 2013 | Free | Second nationality: Croatia |
| 19 | DF | (Bosnia and Herzegovina) | Velibor Vasilić | 45 | Non-EU | 2011 | 32 | 0 | 2013 | Free | |
| 20 | MF | (Bosnia and Herzegovina) | Mirsad Bešlija | 47 | Non-EU | 2009 | 33 | 2 | 2013 | Free | |
| 21 | FW | (Switzerland) | Omar Baljić | 35 | EU | 2010 | 0 | 0 | 2012 | Free | Second nationality: Bosnia and Herzegovina |
| 22 | GK | (Bosnia and Herzegovina) | Semir Bukvić | 35 | Non-EU | 2011 | 3 | 0 | 2013 | Free | |
| 23 | MF | (Bosnia and Herzegovina) | Muamer Svraka | 38 | Non-EU | 2009 | 39 | 12 | 2012 | Youth system | |
| 24 | MF | (Bosnia and Herzegovina) | Nermin Jamak | 40 | Non-EU | 2011 | 32 | 3 | 2013 | Free | Originally from youth system |
| 27 | MF | (Bosnia and Herzegovina) | Sulejman Smajić | 42 | Non-EU | 2011 | 19 | 2 | 2013 | Free | |
| 28 | MF | (North Macedonia) | Perica Stančeski | 41 | Non-EU | 2011 | 8 | 0 | 2012 | Free | Second nationality: Serbia |
| 90 | MF | (Bosnia and Herzegovina) | Samir Bekrić | 42 | Non-EU | 2012 | 16 | 5 | 2013 | Free | |

- Last updated: 23 May 2012
- Source: FKŽeljezničar.com and Footballdatabase.com (for EU passport)

Total squad cost: €6,800,000

=== From the youth system ===
Note: Flags indicate national team as defined under FIFA eligibility rules; some limited exceptions apply. Players may hold more than one non-FIFA nationality.

| No. | Pos. | Nation | Player |
|---|---|---|---|
| 13 | MF | BIH | Haris Hajradinović |
| 25 | DF | BIH | Emrah Hasanhodžić |

| No. | Pos. | Nation | Player |
|---|---|---|---|
| — | DF | BIH | Amar Prutina |

=== Disciplinary record ===
Includes all competitive matches. The list is sorted by position, and then shirt number.

| N | P | Nat. | Name | League | | | Cup | | | Europe | | | Others | | | Total | | | Notes |
| N | P | Nat. | Name | Yellow card | Second yellow card | Red card | Yellow card | Second yellow card | Red card | Yellow card | Second yellow card | Red card | Yellow card | Second yellow card | Red card | Yellow card | Second yellow card | Red card | Notes |
| 1 | GK | (Bosnia and Herzegovina) | Adnan Gušo | 2 | | | 2 | | | | | | | | | 4 | | | |
| 12 | GK | (Bosnia and Herzegovina) | Elvis Karić | 1 | | | | | 1 | | | | | | | 1 | | 1 | |
| 22 | GK | (Bosnia and Herzegovina) | Semir Bukvić | | | | | | | | | | | | | | | | |
| 2 | DF | (Bosnia and Herzegovina) | Elvir Čolić | 3 | | | | | | | | | | | | 3 | | | |
| 3 | DF | (Bosnia and Herzegovina) | Josip Kvesić | 2 | | | | | | | | | | | | 2 | | | |
| 4 | DF | (Montenegro) | Goran Marković | | | | | | | 1 | | | | | | 1 | | | |
| 5 | DF | (Bosnia and Herzegovina) | Semir Kerla | 1 | | | | | | | | | | | | 1 | | | |
| 6 | DF | (Bosnia and Herzegovina) | Jadranko Bogičević | 5 | | | 1 | 1 | | | | | | | | 6 | 1 | | |
| 15 | DF | (Liberia) | Nyema Gerhardt | 9 | | | 2 | | | 1 | | | | | | 12 | | | |
| 17 | DF | (Bosnia and Herzegovina) | Benjamin Čolić | 3 | | | | | | | | | | | | 3 | | | |
| 18 | DF | (Bosnia and Herzegovina) | Josip Ćutuk | | | | | | | | | | | | | | | | |
| 19 | DF | (Bosnia and Herzegovina) | Velibor Vasilić | 4 | | | 1 | | | 1 | | | | | | 6 | | | |
| 8 | MF | (Bosnia and Herzegovina) | Nermin Zolotić | | | | | | | | | | | | | | | | |
| 10 | MF | (Bosnia and Herzegovina) | Zajko Zeba | 4 | | | | | | | | | | | | 4 | | | |
| 11 | MF | (Bosnia and Herzegovina) | Srđan Stanić | 1 | | | | | | | | | | | | 1 | | | |
| 20 | MF | (Bosnia and Herzegovina) | Mirsad Bešlija | 2 | | | | | | | | | | | | 2 | | | |
| 23 | MF | (Bosnia and Herzegovina) | Muamer Svraka | 4 | | | 2 | | | 1 | | | | | | 7 | | | |
| 24 | MF | (Bosnia and Herzegovina) | Nermin Jamak | 5 | | | | | | | | | | | | 5 | | | |
| 27 | MF | (Bosnia and Herzegovina) | Sulejman Smajić | 2 | | | | | | 2 | | | | | | 4 | | | |
| 28 | MF | (North Macedonia) | Perica Stančeski | | | | | | | 1 | | | | | | 1 | | | |
| 90 | MF | (Bosnia and Herzegovina) | Samir Bekrić | 1 | | | | | | | | | | | | 1 | | | |
| 9 | FW | (Bosnia and Herzegovina) | Eldin Adilović | | | 1 | 1 | | | | | | | | | 1 | | 1 | |
| 14 | FW | (Bosnia and Herzegovina) | Mirsad Ramić | 1 | | | | | | | | | | | | 1 | | | |
| 16 | FW | (Bosnia and Herzegovina) | Vernes Selimović | 2 | | | 1 | | | | | | | | | 3 | | | |
| 21 | FW | (Switzerland) | Omar Baljić | | | | | | | | | | | | | | | | |

Last updated: 16 May 2012
Source: Competitive matches and FKŽeljezničar.com
Ordered by (red card) , (second yellow card) and (yellow card)
(yellow card) = Number of bookings; (second yellow card) = Number of sending offs after a second yellow card; (red card) = Number of sending offs by a direct red card.

== Transfers ==
=== In ===
| No. | Pos. | Nat. | Name | Age | EU | Moving from | Type | Transfer window | Ends | Transfer fee | Source |
|---|---|---|---|---|---|---|---|---|---|---|---|
| 22 | GK | (Bosnia and Herzegovina) | Semir Bukvić | 35 | Non-EU | Olimpic | Transfer | Summer | 2013 | Free | |
| 25 | DF | (Bosnia and Herzegovina) | Emir Alić | 35 | Non-EU | SAŠK Napredak | Loan return | Summer | 2012 | N/A | |
| 3 | DF | (Bosnia and Herzegovina) | Josip Kvesić | 35 | Non-EU | Varaždin (Croatia) | Transfer | Summer | 2013 | Free | |
| 27 | MF | (Bosnia and Herzegovina) | Sulejman Smajić | 42 | Non-EU | Lokeren (Belgium) | Transfer | Summer | 2013 | Free | |
| 30 | MF | (Bosnia and Herzegovina) | Dejan Drakul | 38 | Non-EU | Free agent | Sign | Summer | 2013 | Free | |
| 16 | FW | (Bosnia and Herzegovina) | Vernes Selimović | 43 | Non-EU | Zrinjski | Transfer | Summer | 2012 | Free | |
| 9 | FW | (Bosnia and Herzegovina) | Eldin Adilović | 40 | Non-EU | Čelik | Transfer | Summer | 2013 | Free | |
| 18 | DF | (Bosnia and Herzegovina) | Josip Ćutuk | 41 | Non-EU | Free agent | Sign | Winter | 2013 | Free | |
| 5 | DF | (Bosnia and Herzegovina) | Semir Kerla | 38 | Non-EU | Žilina (Slovakia) | Transfer | Winter | 2014 | Free | |
| 90 | MF | (Bosnia and Herzegovina) | Samir Bekrić | 42 | Non-EU | Tobol (Kazakhstan) | Transfer | Winter | 2013 | Free | |
| 29 | FW | (Bosnia and Herzegovina) | Šaban Pehilj | 33 | Non-EU | Krajišnik | Loan return | Winter | 2012 | N/A | |
| 26 | FW | (Bosnia and Herzegovina) | Aleksandar Nikolić | 35 | Non-EU | Drina Zvornik | Loan return | Winter | 2012 | N/A | |

Total expenditure: ▼

=== Out ===
| No. | Pos. | Nat. | Name | Age | EU | Moving to | Type | Transfer window | Transfer fee | Source |
|---|---|---|---|---|---|---|---|---|---|---|
| 12 | GK | (Bosnia and Herzegovina) | Ibrahim Šehić | 37 | Non-EU | Mersin İdmanyurdu (Turkey) | Transfer | Summer | €425,000 | FKŽeljezničar.com |
| 24 | DF | (Bosnia and Herzegovina) | Elvis Mešić | 45 | Non-EU | Hapoel Rishon LeZion (Israel) | Transfer | Summer | Free | FKŽeljezničar.com |
| 5 | DF | (North Macedonia) | Goran Gančev | 43 | Non-EU | Inter Zaprešić (Croatia) | Transfer | Summer | Free | |
| 3 | DF | (Serbia) | Mirko Radovanović | 40 | Non-EU | Free agent | End of contract | Summer | Free | |
| 25 | DF | (Bosnia and Herzegovina) | Emir Alić | 35 | Non-EU | Sloboda Tuzla | Contract termination | Summer | Free | |
| 13 | MF | (Bosnia and Herzegovina) | Edin Višća | 36 | Non-EU | İstanbul B.B. (Turkey) | Transfer | Summer | €400,000 | FKŽeljezničar.com |
| 25 | MF | (Croatia) | Goran Perak | 40 | Non-EU | Vinogradar (Croatia) | Transfer | Summer | Free | FKŽeljezničar.com |
| 16 | MF | (Serbia) | Milan Ćulum | 41 | Non-EU | Volgar-Gazprom Astrakhan (Russia) | Transfer | Summer | Free | FKŽeljezničar.com |
| 29 | FW | (Serbia) | Lazar Popović | 43 | Non-EU | Free agent | End of contract | Summer | Free | FKŽeljezničar.com |
| 9 | FW | (Serbia) | Damir Rovčanin | 38 | Non-EU | Velež | Transfer | Summer | Free | |
| 14 | FW | (Bosnia and Herzegovina) | Bajro Spahić | 42 | Non-EU | Velež | Transfer | Summer | Free | FKŽeljezničar.com |
| 29 | FW | (Bosnia and Herzegovina) | Šaban Pehilj | 33 | Non-EU | Krajišnik | Loan | Summer | N/A | |
| 26 | FW | (Bosnia and Herzegovina) | Aleksandar Nikolić | 35 | Non-EU | Drina Zvornik | Loan | Summer | N/A | |
| 5 | MF | (Bosnia and Herzegovina) | Srđan Savić | 40 | Non-EU | Karviná (Czech Republic) | Contract termination | Winter | Free | FKŽeljezničar.com |
| 30 | MF | (Bosnia and Herzegovina) | Dejan Drakul | 38 | Non-EU | Free agent | Contract termination | Winter | Free | |
| 29 | FW | (Bosnia and Herzegovina) | Šaban Pehilj | 33 | Non-EU | Kozara | Loan | Winter | N/A | |
| 26 | FW | (Bosnia and Herzegovina) | Aleksandar Nikolić | 35 | Non-EU | Radnik | Loan | Winter | N/A | |

Total income: ▲€825,000

== Competitions ==
=== Pre-season ===
| 30 June 2011 | Maribor (Slovenia) | 3 – 3 | (Bosnia and Herzegovina) Željezničar | Moravski Stadion, Moravske Toplice |
| | Volaš 18'; Cvijanović 22'; Ploj 88' | Report | Adilović 6'; Ramić 70'; Selimović 76' |

| 2 July 2011 | Sturm Graz (Austria) | 1 – 0 | (Bosnia and Herzegovina) Željezničar | UPC-Arena, Graz |
| | Bodul 65' | Report |

| 5 July 2011 | Željezničar (Bosnia and Herzegovina) | 2 – 2 | (Czech Republic) Baumit Jablonec | Moravski Stadion, Moravske Toplice |
| 17:30 CEST | | Report | Savić 40' Zeba 84' (pen.) |

| 7 July 2011 | Željezničar (Bosnia and Herzegovina) | 4 – 3 | (Turkey) İstanbul BB | Moravski Stadion, Moravske Toplice |
| 17:30 CEST | Adilović x2 Jamak x2 | Report |

=== Mid-season ===
| 28 January 2012 | Zrinjski Mostar (Bosnia and Herzegovina) | 0 – 1 | (Bosnia and Herzegovina) Željezničar | Stadion Međugorje, Međugorje |
| | | Report | Adilović 39' |

| 30 January 2012 | Željezničar (Bosnia and Herzegovina) | 1 – 3 | (Croatia) Osijek | Stadion Međugorje, Međugorje |
| | Svraka 55' | Report |

| 1 February 2012 | Željezničar (Bosnia and Herzegovina) | 0 – 1 | (Croatia) Rijeka | Stadion Međugorje, Međugorje |
| | | Report |

| 10 February 2012 | Željezničar (Bosnia and Herzegovina) | 2 – 2 | (Croatia) Slaven Belupo | Stadion Valbruna, Rovinjsko Selo |
| | Bekrić 30'; Zeba 80' | Report | Milardinović 32' (pen.); Mujanović 62' |

| 12 February 2012 | Rijeka (Croatia) | 1 – 0 | (Bosnia and Herzegovina) Željezničar | Stadion Kantrida, Rijeka |
| | Matovina 90' | Report |

| 15 February 2012 | Željezničar (Bosnia and Herzegovina) | 2 – 1 | (Slovenia) Olimpija Ljubljana | Stadion Valbruna, Rovinjsko Selo |
| | Selimović 30'; Stanić 79' | Report | Ranić 44' |

| 17 February 2012 | Željezničar (Bosnia and Herzegovina) | 0 – 0 | (Hungary) Pécsi | Stadion Valbruna, Rovinjsko Selo |
| | | Report |

| 19 February 2012 | Željezničar (Bosnia and Herzegovina) | 3 – 0 | Austria Klagenfurt | Stadion Valbruna, Rovinjsko Selo |
| 13.00 | Zeba 38' |

| 25 February 2012 | Željezničar (Bosnia and Herzegovina) | 5 – 0 | (Croatia) Neretva | Stadion Međugorje, Međugorje |

| 29 February 2012 | GOŠK Gabela (Bosnia and Herzegovina) | 0 – 0 | (Bosnia and Herzegovina) Željezničar | Stadion Međugorje, Međugorje |

| 3 March 2012 | Željezničar (Bosnia and Herzegovina) | 2 – 2 | (Bosnia and Herzegovina) Leotar Trebinje | Stadion Međugorje, Međugorje |

=== Overall ===
| Competition | Started round | Final result | First match | Last Match |
|---|---|---|---|---|
| 2011–12 Premier League of Bosnia and Herzegovina | —N/a | Winner | 7 August | 23 May 2012 |
| 2011–12 Kup Bosne i Hercegovine | Round of 32 | Winner | 14 September | 16 May 2012 |
| 2011–12 UEFA Europa League | QR2 | QR3 | 14 July | 4 August |

=== League table ===
| Pos | Team | Pld | W | D | L | GF | GA | GD | Pts | Qualification or relegation |
|---|---|---|---|---|---|---|---|---|---|---|
| 1 | Željezničar (C) | 30 | 22 | 5 | 3 | 68 | 17 | +51 | 71 | Qualification to Champions League second qualifying round |
| 2 | Široki Brijeg | 30 | 18 | 9 | 3 | 48 | 17 | +31 | 63 | Qualification to Europa League second qualifying round (Note: As Željezničar also won the national cup, their slot as the cup winner was taken by the second-placed team in the league, Široki Brijeg. As Široki Brijeg was also the runner-up in the cup, the fourth placed team on the league table also qualified for UEFA Europa League.) |
| 3 | Borac Banja Luka | 30 | 17 | 4 | 9 | 46 | 26 | +20 | 55 | Qualification to Europa League first qualifying round |
| 4 | Sarajevo | 30 | 16 | 6 | 8 | 48 | 31 | +17 | 54 | Qualification to Europa League first qualifying round |
| 5 | Olimpic | 30 | 15 | 7 | 8 | 44 | 23 | +21 | 52 | |

Source: SportSport.ba (in Bosnian)
Rules for classification: 1st points; 2nd goal difference; 3rd goals scored
For deciding champions, qualification to UEFA Europa League and relegation: 1st points; 2nd head-to-head points; 3rd head-to-head goal difference; 4th head-to-head goals scored; 5th head-to-head away goals scored; 6th goal difference; 7th goals scored
(C) Champions

==== Results summary ====
| Overall | | | | | | | | Home | | | | | | Away | | | | | |
| Pld | W | D | L | GF | GA | GD | Pts | W | D | L | GF | GA | GD | W | D | L | GF | GA | GD |
|---|---|---|---|---|---|---|---|---|---|---|---|---|---|---|---|---|---|---|---|
| 30 | 22 | 5 | 3 | 68 | 17 | +51 | 71 | 13 | 2 | 0 | 36 | 6 | +30 | 9 | 3 | 3 | 32 | 11 | +21 |

Last updated: 23 May 2012.
Source: Sportsport.ba

==== Results by round ====
| Round | 1 | 2 | 3 | 4 | 5 | 6 | 7 | 8 | 9 | 10 | 11 | 12 | 13 | 14 | 15 | 16 | 17 | 18 | 19 | 20 | 21 | 22 | 23 | 24 | 25 | 26 | 27 | 28 | 29 | 30 |
|---|---|---|---|---|---|---|---|---|---|---|---|---|---|---|---|---|---|---|---|---|---|---|---|---|---|---|---|---|---|---|
| Ground | A | H | A | H | A | A | H | A | H | A | H | A | H | A | H | H | A | H | A | H | H | A | H | A | H | A | H | A | H | A |
| Result | L | W | L | D | W | D | W | W | W | W | W | W | W | W | W | W | W | W | D | D | W | W | W | W | W | W | W | D | W | L |
| Position | 12 | 7 | 11 | 9 | 6 | 7 | 5 | 4 | 3 | 3 | 2 | 2 | 2 | 2 | 1 | 1 | 1 | 1 | 1 | 1 | 1 | 1 | 1 | 1 | 1 | 1 | 1 | 1 | 1 | 1 |

Updated to match(es) played on 23 May 2012. Source: Sportsport.ba
A = Away; H = Home; W = Win; D = Draw; L = Loss

==== Matches ====
Željezničar's eighth-round match against Borac was abandoned after Borac supporters invaded the pitch and threw stones at Željezničar supporters, immediately after Željezničar had opened the scoring. The match was ultimately abandoned and awarded to Željezničar.

Željezničar had a 26-game undefeated streak in the league only broken by Leotar on the 30th and final round of the season. Željezničar had clinched the title at this point, while Leotar needed to win to avoid relegation.

| 7 August 2011 1 | Široki Brijeg | 2 – 1 | Željezničar | Pecara Stadium, Široki Brijeg |
| 21:00 | Čolić 17' (o.g.); Wagner 90' | Report | Ćorić 27' (o.g.) | Attendance: 2,000; Referee: Danijel Pajić (Bijeljina) |

| 13 August 2011 2 | Željezničar | 3 – 0 | Rudar Prijedor | Grbavica Stadium, Sarajevo |
| 21:00 | Adilović 47'; Zeba 65', 76' | Report | | Attendance: 4,000; Referee: Goran Paradžik (Ljubuški) |

| 20 August 2011 3 | Travnik | 2 – 1 | Željezničar | Stadion Pirota, Travnik |
| 17:00 | N. Varupa 2'; E. Varupa 83' | Report | Selimović 45' | Attendance: 3,500; Referee: Semir Kaplan (Stolac) |

| 24 August 2011 4 | Željezničar | 3 – 3 | Zrinjski Mostar | Grbavica Stadium, Sarajevo |

| 28 August 2011 5 | Olimpic Sarajevo | 0 – 1 | Željezničar | Asim Ferhatović Hase Stadium, Sarajevo |

| 10 September 2011 6 | Čelik Zenica | 1 – 1 | Željezničar | Bilino Polje, Zenica |

| 18 September 2011 7 | Željezničar | 1 – 0 | Zvijezda Gradačac | Grbavica Stadium, Sarajevo |

| 24 September 2011 8 | Borac Banja Luka | 0 – 3 (Match aborted at 0–1) | Željezničar | Gradski Stadion, Banja Luka |

| 2 October 2011 9 | Željezničar | 4 – 0 | Sloboda Tuzla | Grbavica Stadium, Sarajevo |

| 16 October 2011 10 | GOŠK Gabela | 0 – 1 | Željezničar | Stadion Podavala, Gabela |

| 23 October 2011 11 | Željezničar | 4 – 1 | Velež Mostar | Grbavica Stadium, Sarajevo |

| 30 October 2011 12 | Slavija | 1 – 5 | Željezničar | Gradski SRC Slavija Stadium, Istočno Sarajevo |

| 5 November 2011 13 | Željezničar | 1 – 0 | Sarajevo | Grbavica Stadium, Sarajevo |

| 19 November 2011 14 | Kozara Gradiška | 0 – 2 | Željezničar | Gradski Stadion, Gradiška |

| 26 November 2011 15 | Željezničar | 2 – 0 | Leotar Trebinje | Grbavica Stadium, Sarajevo |

| 10 March 2012 16 | Željezničar | 1 – 0 | Široki Brijeg | Grbavica Stadium, Sarajevo |
| 14:00 | Svraka 43' |

| 17 March 2012 17 | Rudar Prijedor | 0 – 5 | Željezničar | Gradski Stadion, Prijedor |
| 15:00 | | Report | Adilović 24', 42', 50', 83'; Bekrić 54' | Attendance: 2,000; Referee: Tomislav Čuić (Tomislavgrad) |

| 24 March 2012 18 | Željezničar | 1 – 0 | Travnik | Grbavica Stadium, Sarajevo |
| 18:00 | Selimović 56' |

| 1 April 2012 19 | Zrinjski Mostar | 0 – 0 | Željezničar | Bijeli Brijeg Stadium, Mostar |
| 18:30 |

| 7 April 2012 20 | Željezničar | 0 – 0 | Olimpic Sarajevo | Grbavica Stadium, Sarajevo |

| 11 April 2012 21 | Željezničar | 5 – 0 | Čelik Zenica | Grbavica Stadium, Sarajevo |
| 19:00 |

| 14 April 2012 22 | Zvijezda Gradačac | 0 – 3 | Željezničar | Banja Ilidža, Gradačac |
| 16:30 |

| 21 April 2012 23 | Željezničar | 1 – 0 | Borac Banja Luka | Grbavica Stadium, Sarajevo |

| 28 April 2012 24 | Sloboda Tuzla | 0 – 4 | Željezničar | Stadion Tušanj, Tuzla |

| 2 May 2012 25 | Željezničar | 5 – 0 | GOŠK Gabela | Grbavica Stadium, Sarajevo |

| 5 May 2012 26 | Velež Mostar | 1 – 2 | Željezničar | Stadion Vrapčići, Mostar |

| 9 May 2012 27 | Željezničar | 3 – 1 | Slavija | Grbavica Stadium, Sarajevo |

| 12 May 2012 28 | Sarajevo | 2 – 2 | Željezničar | Asim Ferhatović Hase Stadium, Sarajevo |

| 20 May 2012 29 | Željezničar | 2 – 1 | Kozara Gradiška | Grbavica Stadium, Sarajevo |

| 23 May 2012 30 | Leotar Trebinje | 2 – 1 | Željezničar | Police Stadium, Trebinje |

=== Kup Bosne i Hercegovine ===
==== Round of 32 ====
| 14 September 2011 | Željezničar | 2 – 0 | Leotar Trebinje | Grbavica Stadium, Sarajevo |
| 19:00 CEST | Zeba 39' (pen.); Svraka 74' | | | Referee: Huseijn Terzić (Travnik) |

==== Round of 16 ====
| 28 September 2011 First leg | Željezničar | 3 – 0 | Olimpic Sarajevo | Grbavica Stadium, Sarajevo |
| 18:30 CEST | | | | Referee: Predrag Stankić (Bijeljina) |

| 19 October 2011 Second leg | Olimpic Sarajevo | 1 – 1 (1 – 4 agg.) | Željezničar | Stadion Otoka, Sarajevo |
| | | | | Referee: Predrag Stankić (Bijeljina) |

==== Quarter-finals ====
| 2 November 2011 First leg | Željezničar | 2 – 0 | Čelik Zenica | Grbavica Stadium, Sarajevo |

| 23 November 2011 Second leg | Čelik Zenica | 0 – 0 (0 – 2 agg.) | Željezničar | Bilino Polje, Zenica |

==== Semi-finals ====
| 14 March 2012 First leg | Željezničar | 1 – 0 | Borac Banja Luka | Grbavica Stadium, Sarajevo |
| 17:00 CET | Zeba 87' |

| 4 April 2012 | Borac | 0 – 3 (Match aborted at 0–1) (0 – 4 agg.) | Željezničar | Gradski Stadion, Banja Luka |
| 17:00 CEST | | Report | Zeba 45' | Attendance: 3,000; Referee: Midhat Arnautović (Lukavac) |

==== Final ====
| 25 April 2012 First leg | Željezničar | 1 – 0 | Široki Brijeg | Grbavica Stadium, Sarajevo |

| 16 May 2012 Second leg | Široki Brijeg | 0 – 0 (0 – 1 agg.) | Željezničar | Pecara Stadium, Široki Brijeg |

=== UEFA Europa League ===
Though they won the domestic double, Željezničar was not successful in Europe, only winning one round against Sheriff Tiraspol. After going down 2–0 to Maccabi Tel Aviv at home, Željezničar was demolished 6–0 in the return leg after conceding two late consolation goals, including an own goal by the goalkeeper.

==== Second qualifying round ====
| 14 July 2011 First leg | Željezničar (Bosnia and Herzegovina) | 1 – 0 | (Moldova) Sheriff Tiraspol | Asim Ferhatović Hase Stadium, Sarajevo |
| 20:30 CEST | Bešlija 60' | Report | | Attendance: 10,000; Referee: Anastasios Sidiropoulos (Greece) |

| 21 July 2011 Second leg | Sheriff Tiraspol (Moldova) | 0 – 0 (0 – 1 agg.) | (Bosnia and Herzegovina) Željezničar | Malaya Sportivnaya Arena, Tiraspol |
| 18:00 CEST | | Report | | Attendance: 5,120; Referee: Kenn Hansen (Denmark) |

==== Third qualifying round ====
| 28 July 2011 First leg | Željezničar (Bosnia and Herzegovina) | 0 – 2 | (Israel) Maccabi Tel Aviv | Asim Ferhatović Hase Stadium, Sarajevo |
| 20:30 CEST | | Report | Colautti 47', 56' | Attendance: 10,000; Referee: Michael Lerjeus (Sweden) |

| 4 August 2011 Second leg | Maccabi Tel Aviv (Israel) | 6 – 0 (8 – 0 agg.) | (Bosnia and Herzegovina) Željezničar | Bloomfield Stadium, Tel Aviv |
| 19:30 CEST | Colautti 18', 45+1'; Dahan 38'; Atar 54', 86'; Selimović 81' (o.g.) | Report | | Attendance: 6,013; Referee: Alan Black (Northern Ireland) |
