= 2012–13 FK Željezničar season =

Željezničar
2012–13 season
- President: Sabahudin Žujo (until 27 December); Almir Gredić (from 27 December)
- Manager: Amar Osim
- Stadium: Grbavica Stadium
- Premijer Liga BiH: Winner
- Kup BiH: Runners-up
- UEFA Champions League: Second qualifying round
- Top goalscorer: League: Eldin Adilović (18); All: Eldin Adilović (24)
- Highest home attendance: 8,000 vs Sarajevo
- Lowest home attendance: 1,500 vs Olimpic

== Statistics 2012-13 ==
=== Squad information ===
N	Pos.	Nat.	Name	Age	EU	Since	App	Goals	Ends	Transfer fee	Notes
2	MF	(Bosnia and Herzegovina)	Elvir Čolić	38	EU	2010	21	2	2014	Free	Second nationality: Slovenia
3	DF	(Bosnia and Herzegovina)	Josip Kvesić	34	Non-EU	2011	22	1	2013	Free	Second nationality: Croatia
4	FW	(Bosnia and Herzegovina)	Danijal Brković	33	Non-EU	2012	12	2	2014	Free	Second nationality: USA
5	DF	(Bosnia and Herzegovina)	Semir Kerla	37	Non-EU	2012 (Winter)	17	1	2014	Free	
6	DF	(Bosnia and Herzegovina)	Jadranko Bogičević	42	Non-EU	2010 (Winter)	34	3	2013	Free	
7	MF	(Bosnia and Herzegovina)	Sulejman Smajić	40	Non-EU	2011	9	0	2013	Free	
8	MF	(Bosnia and Herzegovina)	Nermin Zolotić	31	Non-EU	2010	28	0	2014	Youth system	
9	FW	(Bosnia and Herzegovina)	Eldin Adilović	39	Non-EU	2011	40	24	2013	Free	
11	MF	(Bosnia and Herzegovina)	Srđan Stanić	35	Non-EU	2007	32	1	2015	Youth system	Second nationality: Croatia
12	GK	(Bosnia and Herzegovina)	Elvis Karić	44	Non-EU	2010	0	0	2013	Free	
14	MF	(Bosnia and Herzegovina)	Damir Sadiković	29	Non-EU	2013 (Winter)	2	0	2016	Youth system	
15	FW	(Bosnia and Herzegovina)	Armin Hodžić	30	Non-EU	2012	22	4	2013	Youth system	Loan
16	FW	(Bosnia and Herzegovina)	Vernes Selimović	41	Non-EU	2011	35	5	2013	Free	
17	DF	(Bosnia and Herzegovina)	Benjamin Čolić	33	Non-EU	2009	37	0	2015	Youth system	
18	DF	(Bosnia and Herzegovina)	Josip Ćutuk	39	Non-EU	2012 (Winter)	5	0	2013	Free	Second nationality: Croatia
19	DF	(Bosnia and Herzegovina)	Velibor Vasilić	44	Non-EU	2011	31	0	2013	Free	
22	GK	(Bosnia and Herzegovina)	Semir Bukvić	33	Non-EU	2011	0	0	2013	Free	
23	MF	(Bosnia and Herzegovina)	Muamer Svraka	37	Non-EU	2009	35	8	2015	Youth system	
24	MF	(Bosnia and Herzegovina)	Nermin Jamak	38	Non-EU	2011 (Winter)	31	3	2015	Free	Originally from youth system
25	MF	(Croatia)	Tomislav Tomić	34	Non-EU	2012	22	1	2014	Free	Second nationality: Bosnia and Herzegovina
26	MF	(Japan)	Eishun Yoshida	39	Non-EU	2012	0	0	2013	Free	
29	FW	(Bosnia and Herzegovina)	Šaban Pehilj	32	Non-EU	2010	7	1	2013	Youth system	
30	GK	(Croatia)	Marijan Antolović	35	Non-EU	2012	40	0	2013	Free	Loan
44	MF	(Bosnia and Herzegovina)	Eldar Hasanović	35	Non-EU	2012	13	0	2015	Free	Originally from youth system
85	DF	(North Macedonia)	Yani Urdinov	33	EU	2013 (Winter)	11	0	2014	Free	Second nationality: Belgium
90	MF	(Bosnia and Herzegovina)	Samir Bekrić	40	Non-EU	2011	27	5	2013	Free	

- Last updated: 26 May 2013
- Source: FKŽeljezničar.com and Footballdatabase.com (for EU passport)

Total squad cost: €5,775,000

=== From the youth system ===
Note: Flags indicate national team as defined under FIFA eligibility rules; some limited exceptions apply. Players may hold more than one non-FIFA nationality.

No.	Pos.	Nation	Player
—	GK	(Bosnia and Herzegovina) BIH	Vedran Kjosevski
—	MF	(Bosnia and Herzegovina) BIH	Damir Sadiković

No.	Pos.	Nation	Player
—	FW	(Bosnia and Herzegovina) BIH	Armin Hodžić
—	FW	(Bosnia and Herzegovina) BIH	Riad Bajić

=== Disciplinary record ===
Includes all competitive matches. The list is sorted by position, and then shirt number.

N	P	Nat.	Name	League			Cup			Europe			Others			Total			Notes
N	P	Nat.	Name	Yellow card	Second yellow card	Red card	Yellow card	Second yellow card	Red card	Yellow card	Second yellow card	Red card	Yellow card	Second yellow card	Red card	Yellow card	Second yellow card	Red card	Notes
12	GK	(Bosnia and Herzegovina)	Elvis Karić																
22	GK	(Bosnia and Herzegovina)	Semir Bukvić																
30	GK	(Croatia)	Marijan Antolović				1									1			
3	DF	(Bosnia and Herzegovina)	Josip Kvesić	1												1			
5	DF	(Bosnia and Herzegovina)	Semir Kerla	4			1			2						7			
6	DF	(Bosnia and Herzegovina)	Jadranko Bogičević	4			1			1						6			
17	DF	(Bosnia and Herzegovina)	Benjamin Čolić	2	1						1					2	2		
18	DF	(Bosnia and Herzegovina)	Josip Ćutuk																
19	DF	(Bosnia and Herzegovina)	Velibor Vasilić	5		1		1								5	1	1	
85	DF	(North Macedonia)	Yani Urdinov	2			1									3			
2	MF	(Bosnia and Herzegovina)	Elvir Čolić	1												1			
7	MF	(Bosnia and Herzegovina)	Sulejman Smajić																
8	MF	(Bosnia and Herzegovina)	Nermin Zolotić	5						1						6			
11	MF	(Bosnia and Herzegovina)	Srđan Stanić	2			3	1				1				5	1	1	
14	MF	(Bosnia and Herzegovina)	Damir Sadiković																
23	MF	(Bosnia and Herzegovina)	Muamer Svraka	4			2			1	1					7	1		
24	MF	(Bosnia and Herzegovina)	Nermin Jamak	7	1	1	1			1						9	1	1	
25	MF	(Croatia)	Tomislav Tomić	1												1			
26	MF	(Japan)	Eishun Yoshida																
44	MF	(Bosnia and Herzegovina)	Eldar Hasanović	1												1			
90	MF	(Bosnia and Herzegovina)	Samir Bekrić	3					1	1						4		1	
4	FW	(Bosnia and Herzegovina)	Danijal Brković	2												2			
9	FW	(Bosnia and Herzegovina)	Eldin Adilović	2						2						4			
15	FW	(Bosnia and Herzegovina)	Armin Hodžić	2												2			
16	FW	(Bosnia and Herzegovina)	Vernes Selimović	1			1									2			
29	FW	(Bosnia and Herzegovina)	Šaban Pehilj	1												1			

Last updated: 26 May 2013
Source: Competitive matches and FKŽeljezničar.com
Ordered by (red card) , (second yellow card) and (yellow card)
(yellow card) = Number of bookings; (second yellow card) = Number of sending offs after a second yellow card; (red card) = Number of sending offs by a direct red card.

== Transfers ==
=== In ===
No.	Pos.	Nat.	Name	Age	EU	Moving from	Type	Transfer window	Ends	Transfer fee	Source
4	FW	(Bosnia and Herzegovina)	Danijal Brković	33	Non-EU	Velež	Transfer	Summer	2014	Free	Sportin.ba
25	MF	(Croatia)	Tomislav Tomić	34	Non-EU	Široki Brijeg	Transfer	Summer	2014	Free	Sportin.ba
30	GK	(Croatia)	Marijan Antolović	35	Non-EU	Legia Warsaw (Poland)	Loan	Summer	2013	Free	SportSport.ba
26	DF	(Japan)	Eishun Yoshida	39	Non-EU	Free agent	Sign	Summer	2013	Free	SportSport.ba
44	MF	(Bosnia and Herzegovina)	Eldar Hasanović	35	Non-EU	Free agent	Sign	Mid-season	2015	Free	FKŽeljezničnar.ba
85	DF	(North Macedonia)	Yani Urdinov	33	EU	Free agent	Sign	Winter	2014	Free	SCSport.ba

Total expenditure: ▼

=== Out ===
N	Pos.	Nat.	Name	Age	EU	Moving to	Type	Transfer window	Transfer fee	Source
1	GK	(Bosnia and Herzegovina)	Adnan Gušo	49	Non-EU	Retired	End of career	Summer	Free	FKŽeljezničnar.ba
4	DF	(Montenegro)	Goran Marković	39	Non-EU	Zrinjski	End of contract	Summer	Free	FKŽeljezničnar.ba
28	MF	(North Macedonia)	Perica Stančeski	40	Non-EU	Free agent	End of contract	Summer	Free	FKŽeljezničnar.ba
21	FW	(Switzerland)	Omar Baljić	34	EU	Free agent	End of contract	Summer	Free	
15	DF	(Liberia)	Nyema Gerhardt	39	EU	Melbourne Heart (Australia)	End of contract	Summer	Free	FootballAustralia.com
18	DF	(Bosnia and Herzegovina)	Amar Prutina	32	Non-EU	Zvijezda	Released	Summer	Free	
26	FW	(Bosnia and Herzegovina)	Aleksandar Nikolić	33	Non-EU	Drina Zvornik	Loan	Summer	Free	
15	DF	(Bosnia and Herzegovina)	Emrah Hasanhodžić	31	Non-EU	Bosna	Loan	Summer	Free	SCsport.ba
20	MF	(Bosnia and Herzegovina)	Mirsad Bešlija	46	Non-EU	Retired	End of career	Winter	Free	FKŽeljezničnar.ba
10	MF	(Bosnia and Herzegovina)	Zajko Zeba	41	Non-EU	RNK Split (Croatia)	Contract termination	Winter	€50,000	Sportin.ba
14	FW	(Bosnia and Herzegovina)	Mirsad Ramić	32	Non-EU	Zvijezda	Loan	Winter	Free	SportSport.ba

Total income: ▲€50,000

== Competitions ==
=== Pre-season ===
27 June 2012	Grude (Bosnia and Herzegovina)	0–3	(Bosnia and Herzegovina) Željezničar	Međugorje, Bosnia and Herzegovina
		Report	Bešlija; Zeba; Brković	Stadium: Stadion Međugorje

27 June 2012	Široki Brijeg (Bosnia and Herzegovina)	0–2	(Bosnia and Herzegovina) Željezničar	Međugorje, Bosnia and Herzegovina
		Report	Brković 51'; E. Čolić 80'	Stadium: Stadion Međugorje

29 June 2012	Olimpic (Bosnia and Herzegovina)	1–1	(Bosnia and Herzegovina) Željezničar	Kiseljak, Bosnia and Herzegovina
18:30 CEST	Kapić 25'	Report	Jamak 5'	Stadium: Gradski Stadion

2 July 2012	Kryvbas Kryvyi Rih (Ukraine)	1–1	(Bosnia and Herzegovina) Željezničar	Heiligenkreuz, Austria
18:00 CEST	Lysytskyi 42'	Report	Brković 45'	Stadium: Waldstadion

4 July 2012	Aluminij (Slovenia)	0–0	(Bosnia and Herzegovina) Željezničar	Heiligenkreuz, Austria
18:00 CEST		Report		Stadium: Waldstadion

5 July 2012	Pécsi (Hungary)	0–2	(Bosnia and Herzegovina) Željezničar	Heiligenkreuz, Austria
		Report	Bešlija 24'; Zeba 45'	Stadium: Waldstadion

7 July 2012	Mattersburg (Austria)	0–1	(Bosnia and Herzegovina) Željezničar	Heiligenkreuz, Austria
		Report	Kerla 43'	Stadium: Waldstadion

9 July 2012	Gloria Bistrița (Romania)	1–1	(Bosnia and Herzegovina) Željezničar	Heiligenkreuz, Austria
		Report	Zeba	Stadium: Waldstadion

10 July 2012	Sigma Olomouc (Czech Republic)	2–0	(Bosnia and Herzegovina) Željezničar	Heiligenkreuz, Austria
	Doležal 55'; Ordoš 85'	Report		Stadium: Waldstadion

13 July 2012	Sutjeska (Bosnia and Herzegovina)	1–1	(Bosnia and Herzegovina) Željezničar	Foča, Bosnia and Herzegovina
	Radović 75'	Report	Ramić 5'	Stadium: Gradski Stadion

28 July 2012	GOŠK (Bosnia and Herzegovina)	0–1	(Bosnia and Herzegovina) Željezničar	Međugorje, Bosnia and Herzegovina
		Report	Pehilj	Stadium: Stadion Međugorje

=== Mid-season ===
14 November 2012	Radnik Hadžići (Bosnia and Herzegovina)	1–1	(Bosnia and Herzegovina) Željezničar	Hadžići, Bosnia and Herzegovina
	Fejzić 27'	Report	Adilović 37' (pen.)	Stadium: Gradski Stadion

29 November 2012	Željezničar (Bosnia and Herzegovina)	2–0	(Bosnia and Herzegovina) Bosna	Sarajevo, Bosnia and Herzegovina
	E. Čolić	Report		Stadium: Pomoćni teren Asim Ferhatović Hase

1 December 2012	Željezničar (Bosnia and Herzegovina)	1–0	(Bosnia and Herzegovina) Gradina	Sarajevo, Bosnia and Herzegovina
	B. Čolić 50'	Report		Stadium: Pomoćni teren Asim Ferhatović Hase

24 January 2013	Velež (Bosnia and Herzegovina)	1–2	(Bosnia and Herzegovina) Željezničar	Međugorje, Bosnia and Herzegovina
14:00 UTC+1	Merzić 52'	Report	Obućina 65'; Hodžić 90'	Stadium: Stadion Međugorje; Attendance: 50; Referee: Emir Spahalić (Mostar)

26 January 2013	GOŠK (Bosnia and Herzegovina)	4–2	(Bosnia and Herzegovina) Željezničar	Međugorje, Bosnia and Herzegovina
14:00 UTC+1	Ramović; Jordan; Dominković; Omerkić	Report	Bekrić; Hodžić	Stadium: Stadion Međugorje

2 February 2013 Istria Winter Cup	Istra 1961 (Croatia)	2–1	(Bosnia and Herzegovina) Željezničar	Rovinj, Croatia
14:30 UTC+1	Roce 5'; Pamić 43'	Report	Kerla 25'	Stadium: Stadion Valbruna; Attendance: 150; Referee: Marin Vidulin (Kanfanar)

5 February 2013 Istria Winter Cup	Pomorac (Croatia)	1–1	(Bosnia and Herzegovina) Željezničar	Umag, Croatia
13:00 UTC+1	Mance 76'	Report	Obućina 90'	Stadium: Field Istraturist (Stella Maris); Attendance: 80; Referee: Igor Rajko (Kringa)

6 February 2013	Rijeka (Croatia)	1–1	(Bosnia and Herzegovina) Željezničar	Rijeka, Croatia
18:00 UTC+1	Jogan 71'	Report	Adilović 54'	Stadium: Stadion Kantrida; Attendance: 1,000; Referee: Ivan Bebek (Rijeka)

7 February 2013 Istria Winter Cup	Kecskemét (Hungary)	0–1	(Bosnia and Herzegovina) Željezničar	Novigrad, Croatia
15:00 UTC+1		Report	E. Čolić 88'	Stadium: Stadion Laco

9 February 2013	Split (Croatia)	4–1	(Bosnia and Herzegovina) Željezničar	Split, Croatia
15:00 UTC+1	Baraban 9'; Pehar 27', 35'; Glumac 71'	Report	Selimović 88'	Stadium: Park Mladeži Stadium

13 February 2013	Kaposvár (Hungary)	5–3	(Bosnia and Herzegovina) Željezničar	Rovinj, Croatia
15:00 UTC+1	Bőle; Diallo; Balázs; Oláh	Report	Ćutuk; Selimović; Hasanović	Stadium: Stadion Valbruna

14 February 2013	Žalgiris (Lithuania)	3–2	(Bosnia and Herzegovina) Željezničar	Rovinj, Croatia
13:45 UTC+1	? 60'; Biliński 68'; Krasnovskis 81'	Report	Adilović 6'; Selimović 52'	Stadium: Stadion Valbruna

16 February 2013	Čelik (Bosnia and Herzegovina)	0–3	(Bosnia and Herzegovina) Željezničar	Rovinj, Croatia
18:00 UTC+1		Report	Ćutuk; E. Čolić; Adilović	Stadium: Stadion Valbruna

19 February 2013	Vrsar (Croatia)	0–6	(Bosnia and Herzegovina) Željezničar	Rovinj, Croatia
18:00 UTC+1		Report	Selimović; Hodžić; Brković	Stadium: Stadion Valbruna

23 February 2013	Široki Brijeg (Bosnia and Herzegovina)	2–2	(Bosnia and Herzegovina) Željezničar	Međugorje, Bosnia and Herzegovina
14:00 UTC+1	Wagner; Ivanković	Report	Svraka; Jamak	Stadium: Stadion Međugorje

6 March 2013	Radnik Hadžići (Bosnia and Herzegovina)	1–2	(Bosnia and Herzegovina) Željezničar	Hadžići, Bosnia and Herzegovina
15:00 UTC+1			Pehilj; Bekrić	Stadium: Gradski Stadion

23 March 2013	Travnik (Bosnia and Herzegovina)	0–1	(Bosnia and Herzegovina) Željezničar	Travnik, Bosnia and Herzegovina
15:00 UTC+1		Report	Stanić 80'	Stadium: Stadion Pirota

26 March 2013	Goražde (Bosnia and Herzegovina)	1–1	(Bosnia and Herzegovina) Željezničar	Goražde, Bosnia and Herzegovina
16:00 UTC+1			Stanić	Stadium: Midhat Drljević Stadium

17 April 2013	Famos Vojkovići (Bosnia and Herzegovina)	0–1	(Bosnia and Herzegovina) Željezničar	Istočno Sarajevo, Bosnia and Herzegovina
			Stanić	Stadium: Stadion Vojkovići

=== Overall ===
Competition	Started round	Final result	First match	Last Match
2012–13 Premier League of Bosnia and Herzegovina	—	Winner	4 August 2012	
2012–13 Bosnia and Herzegovina Football Cup	Round of 32	Final	19 September 2012	14 May 2013
2012–13 UEFA Champions League	QR2	QR2	18 July 2012	24 July 2012

=== League table ===
Pos	Team	Pld	W	D	L	GF	GA	GD	Pts	Qualification or relegation
1	Željezničar (C)	30	20	6	4	48	20	+28	66	Qualification to Champions League second qualifying round
2	Sarajevo	30	17	9	4	52	19	+33	60	Qualification to Europa League first qualifying round
3	Borac Banja Luka	30	14	9	7	43	25	+18	51	Ineligible for 2013–14 European competitions (Note: Borac Banja Luka, Čelik, Olimpic, Slavija and Leotar failed to get the UEFA license for the competition due to financial or infrastructural problems.)
4	Čelik	30	14	9	7	44	30	+14	51	Ineligible for 2013–14 European competitions
5	Olimpic	30	13	10	7	34	26	+8	49	Ineligible for 2013–14 European competitions

Source: SportSport.ba (in Bosnian)
Rules for classification: 1st points; 2nd goal difference; 3rd goals scored
For deciding champions, qualification to UEFA Europa League and relegation: 1st points; 2nd head-to-head points; 3rd head-to-head goal difference; 4th head-to-head goals scored; 5th head-to-head away goals scored; 6th goal difference; 7th goals scored
(C) Champions

==== Results summary ====
Overall								Home						Away					
Pld	W	D	L	GF	GA	GD	Pts	W	D	L	GF	GA	GD	W	D	L	GF	GA	GD
30	20	6	4	48	20	+28	66	11	4	0	24	4	+20	9	2	4	24	16	+8

Last updated: 26 May 2013.
Source: Sportsport.ba

==== Results by round ====
Round	1	2	3	4	5	6	7	8	9	10	11	12	13	14	15	16	17	18	19	20	21	22	23	24	25	26	27	28	29	30
Ground	A	H	A	A	H	A	H	A	H	A	H	A	H	A	H	H	A	H	H	A	H	A	H	A	H	A	H	A	H	A
Result	D	W	W	W	W	L	D	W	W	W	W	L	W	W	W	W	L	W	W	W	D	W	D	W	W	W	D	D	W	L
Position	8	4	2	1	2	2	2	2	2	2	2	2	2	2	1	1	1	1	1	1	1	1	1	1	1	1	1	1	1	1

Updated to match(es) played on 26 May 2013. Source: Competitions
A = Away; H = Home; W = Win; D = Draw; L = Loss

==== Matches ====
4 August 2012 1	Travnik	0–0	Željezničar	Travnik
17:30 CEST	Laštro (yellow card) 62'; Pejić (yellow card) 80'; Popović (yellow card) 82'; E.Varupa (yellow card) 89'; Fejzić (yellow card) 90'; Simeunović (yellow card) 90'; Ribić (yellow card) 90'	Report		Stadium: Stadion Pirota; Attendance: 2,000; Referee: Ognjen Valjić (Banja Luka)

12 August 2012 2	Željezničar	1–0	Borac Banja Luka	Sarajevo
19:45 CEST	Svraka 29'; Jamak (red card) 50'	Report	Teinović (yellow card) 15'; Avdukić (yellow card) 31'; Raspudić (yellow card) 43' (yellow-red card) 76'; Radulović (yellow card) 49'; Runić (yellow card) 90+4'	Stadium: Grbavica Stadium; Attendance: 4,500; Referee: Tomislav Čuić (Tomislavgrad)

18 August 2012 3	Zvijezda	1–4	Željezničar	Gradačac
17:00 CEST	Mašić (yellow card) 10'; Jusić (yellow card) 86'; Halilović 87'	Report	Selimović 8'; Adilović 38'; Bekrić (yellow card) 50'; Svraka 78', 90'	Stadium: Banja Ilidža; Attendance: 4,000; Referee: Edin Jakupović (Bihać)

26 August 2012 4	GOŠK	2–3	Željezničar	Gabela
17:00 CEST	Jusufbašić 11', 83'; Dodig (yellow card) 15'; Kojić (yellow card) 27'; Grgić (yellow card) 44'; Milinković (yellow card) 60'; Helvida (yellow card) 90'	Report	Zeba 9'; Selimović 44'; Svraka (yellow card) 52'; Bekrić (yellow card) 54'; Adilović 81'; Brković (yellow card) 90'	Stadium: Stadion Podavala; Attendance: 600; Referee: Radoslav Vukasović (Trebinje)

1 September 2012 5	Željezničar	2–0	Slavija	Sarajevo
19:00 CEST	Kerla 22', (yellow card) 55'; Bešlija 69'; Kvesić (yellow card) 88'	Report	Vidić (yellow card) 19'; Fazlagić (yellow card) 45'; Dudo (yellow card) 55'	Stadium: Grbavica Stadium; Attendance: 4,500; Referee: Predrag Stankić (Bijeljina)

15 September 2012 6	Zrinjski	1–0	Željezničar	Mostar
19:30 CEST	Bubalo (yellow card) 24'; Aničić (yellow card) 37'; Miličević (yellow card) 38'; Šćepanović (yellow card) 53'; Stojkić 82'; Muminović (yellow card) 90'	Report	Jamak (yellow card) 59'; Vasilić (yellow card) 72'	Stadium: Stadion pod Bijelim Brijegom; Attendance: 3,000; Referee: Danijel Pajić (Bijeljina)

23 September 2012 7	Željezničar	1–1	Radnik	Sarajevo
19:00 CEST	B. Čolić (yellow card) 34'; Jamak 76'	Report	Basara 5'; Krsmanović (yellow card) 20'; Lučić (yellow card) 54'; Jovanović (yellow card) 54'	Stadium: Grbavica Stadium; Attendance: 0 Referee: Goran Paradžik (Ljubuški)

29 September 2012 8	Čelik	1–2	Željezničar	Zenica
18:30 CEST	Čović 7'; Horić (yellow card) 16' (yellow-red card) 90'; Travančić (yellow card) 39'; Kuduzović (yellow card) 41'; Barać (yellow card) 51'; Jusić (yellow card) 88'	Report	Svraka (yellow card) 36'; Adilović 36'; Zolotić (yellow card) 70'; Brković 83'	Stadium: Bilino Polje; Attendance: 6,000; Referee: Radoslav Vukasović (Trebinje)

6 October 2012 9	Željezničar	1–0	Rudar Prijedor	Sarajevo
18:30 CEST	Bešlija (yellow card) 40'; Zeba 90', (yellow card) 90'	Report	Bajalica (yellow card) 43'; Kokanović (yellow card) 52'; Puljič (yellow card) 67'; Gigović (yellow card) 82'; Cruz (yellow card) 90'	Stadium: Grbavica Stadium; Attendance: 0 Referee: Ognjen Valjić (Banja Luka)

20 October 2012 10	Gradina	1–2	Željezničar	Gradačac
15:00 CEST	Hodžić (yellow card) 12'; Ordagić (yellow card) 30'; Salihbašić (yellow card) 35'; Popara (yellow card) 63'; Bogičević 90' (o.g.)	Report	Bogičević 23'; Zolotić (yellow card) 45'; B. Čolić (yellow card) 57' (red card) 90'; Bekrić 64'	Stadium: Banja Ilidža; Attendance: 1,000; Referee: Tomislav Čuić (Tomislavgrad)

27 October 2012 11	Željezničar	1–0	Olimpic	Sarajevo
19:00 CEST	Adilović 66'	Report	Regoje (yellow card) 35'; Salčinović (yellow card) 67'	Stadium: Grbavica Stadium; Attendance: 2,000; Referee: Edin Jakupović (Bihać)

3 November 2012 12	Sarajevo	1–0	Željezničar	Sarajevo
20:00 CET	Dupovac (yellow card) 37'; Suljić (yellow card) 38'; Hadžić (yellow card) 42'; Torlak (yellow card) 44'; Nuhanović 66'	Report	Bogičević (yellow card) 19'; Jamak (yellow card) 34'; Zolotić (yellow card) 60'; Stanić (yellow card) 90+3'; Vasilić (yellow card) 90+7'	Stadium: Asim Ferhatović Hase Stadium; Attendance: 13,000; Referee: Elmir Pilav (Sarajevo)

11 November 2012 13	Željezničar	1–0	Velež	Sarajevo
19:00 CET	Svraka (yellow card) 15'; Adilović 33'; Jamak (yellow card) 72'; Bešlija (yellow card) 90+3'	Report	Kodro (yellow card) 18'; Serdarević (yellow card) 82'	Stadium: Grbavica Stadium; Attendance: 3,000; Referee: Husein Terzić (Travnik)

17 November 2012 14	Leotar	0–2	Željezničar	Trebinje
13:00 CET		Report	Adilović 36'; Bekrić 50'	Stadium: Police Stadium; Attendance: 350; Referee: Ilija Živković (Orašje)

25 November 2012 15	Željezničar	2–1	Široki Brijeg	Sarajevo
19:00 CET	Jamak (yellow card) 24'; Bekrić (yellow card) 45+4', (goal) 90+3'; Svraka 47'	Report	Džidić (yellow card) 9'; Šilić (yellow card) 53', (goal) 62'; Bilobrk (yellow card) 68'	Stadium: Grbavica Stadium; Attendance: 6,000; Referee: Ognjen Valjić (Banja Luka)

2 March 2013 16	Željezničar	2–0	Travnik	Sarajevo
19:00 CET	Vasilić (yellow card) 32'; Laštro 52' (o.g.); Bogičević 56'; Jamak (yellow card) 60'; Brković (yellow card) 62'	Report	Popović (yellow card) 17'; Hećo (yellow card) 28'; N. Varupa (yellow card) 30'; Laštro (yellow card) 82'	Stadium: Grbavica Stadium; Attendance: 5,500; Referee: Predrag Stankić (Bijeljina)

9 March 2013 17	Borac Banja Luka	2–0	Željezničar	Banja Luka
17:00 CET	Maletić (yellow card) 19'; Stokić (yellow card) 31', (goal) 33'; Trivunović 37'; Bilbija (yellow card) 70'; Grahovac (yellow card) 76'	Report	Kerla (yellow card) 40'	Stadium: Banja Luka City Stadium; Attendance: 4,000; Referee: Ilija Živković (Orašje)

17 March 2013 18	Željezničar	2–1	Zvijezda	Sarajevo
18:00 CET	Adilović 29', 74'; Hodžić (yellow card) 85'; Zolotić (yellow card) 90'	Report	Savić 22', (yellow card) 45'; Gjurgjević (yellow card) 35'; Mirković (yellow card) 38'; Husić (yellow card) 44'	Stadium: Grbavica Stadium; Attendance: 2,500; Referee: Darko Obradović (Stolac)

30 March 2013 19	Željezničar	2–0	GOŠK	Sarajevo
18:30 CET	Adilović (yellow card) 12'; Hasanović (yellow card) 17'; Bogičević (yellow card) 31'; Selimović 44'; Svraka 75'	Report	Paponja (yellow card) 55'; Bonacin (yellow card) 62'; Šabanović (yellow card) 63'	Stadium: Grbavica Stadium; Attendance: 1,700; Referee: Husein Terzić (Travnik)

7 April 2013 20	Slavija	1–2	Željezničar	Istočno Sarajevo
16:00 CET	Kokot 31'; I. Radovanović (yellow card) 82'	Report	Vasilić (yellow card) 13'; Hodžić 75'; Adilović 90+2', (yellow card) 90+3'	Stadium: Gradski SRC Slavija Stadium; Attendance: 2,000; Referee: Danijel Pajić (Bijeljina)

10 April 2013 21	Željezničar	0–0	Zrinjski	Sarajevo
18:00 CET	Urdinov (yellow card) 54'; Jamak (yellow card) 60' (yellow-red card) 79'; Vasilić (red card) 90+1'	Report	Miličević (yellow card) 61' (yellow-red card) 69'	Stadium: Grbavica Stadium; Attendance: 2,000; Referee: Dragan Skakić (Gradiška)

13 April 2013 22	Radnik	0–3	Željezničar	Bijeljina
16:30 CET	Ristić (yellow card) 31'; Basara (yellow card) 51'; Jevtić (yellow card) 73'	Report	Hodžić 14'; E. Čolić 20', (yellow card) 58'; Urdinov (yellow card) 39'; Stanić (yellow card) 52'; Adilović 79'	Stadium: Gradski Stadion; Attendance: 1,500; Referee: Ilija Živković (Orašje)

20 April 2013 23	Željezničar	1–1	Čelik	Sarajevo
20:00 CET	Tomić 78'; Bogičević (yellow card) 87'; Jamak (yellow card) 89'	Report	Dedić (yellow card) 18'; Mešanović 35'; Nurković (red card) 52'	Stadium: Grbavica Stadium; Attendance: 4,000; Referee: Edin Jakupović (Bihać)

24 April 2013 24	Rudar Prijedor	1–3	Željezničar	Prijedor
17:00 CET	Milutinović (yellow card) 39'; Gigović (yellow card) 63'; Ramić 87'; Kokanović (yellow card) 90'	Report	Svraka 33', 51'; Adilović 75'	Stadium: Gradski Stadion; Attendance: 1,000; Referee: Darko Obradović (Stolac)

27 April 2013 25	Željezničar	4–0	Gradina	Sarajevo
20:00 CET	Svraka 20'; Kerla (yellow card) 39'; Adilović 44', 86' (pen.); Hodžić 79'	Report	Popara (yellow card) 26'; Turbić (yellow card) 38' (yellow-red card) 85'	Stadium: Grbavica Stadium; Attendance: 2,000; Referee: Muamer Bureković (Zenica)

4 May 2013 26	Olimpic	1–2	Željezničar	Sarajevo
17:30 CET	Duljević (yellow card) 28'; Karić 40'; Islamagić (yellow card) 60'	Report	Hodžić 27'; Adilović 62' (pen.); Selimović (yellow card) 75'	Stadium: Stadion Otoka; Attendance: 2,000; Referee: Emir Alečković (Sarajevo)

8 May 2013 27	Željezničar	0–0	Sarajevo	Sarajevo
20:00 CET	Bogičević (yellow card) 33'; Tomić (yellow card) 77'; Hodžić (yellow card) 81'	Report	Suljić (yellow card) 39'; Tadejević (yellow card) 41'; Čomor (yellow card) 84'; Hadžić (yellow card) 88'	Stadium: Grbavica Stadium; Attendance: 8,000; Referee: Danijel Pajić (Bijeljina)

11 May 2013 28	Velež	0–0	Željezničar	Mostar
17:00 CET	Zvonić (yellow card) 55'; Zolj (yellow card) 81'	Report	Jamak (yellow card) 44'; B. Čolić (yellow card) 69'	Stadium: Vrapčići Stadium; Attendance: 1,000; Referee: Vladimir Bjelica (Istočno Sarajevo)

18 May 2013 29	Željezničar	4–0	Leotar	Sarajevo
17:00 CET	Adilović 9', 57', 71'; Bogičević 54'; Svraka (yellow card) 70'	Report	Andrić (yellow card) 35'; Filipović (yellow card) 47'; Stojčev (yellow card) 69'	Stadium: Grbavica Stadium; Attendance: 4,000; Referee: Goran Paradžik (Ljubuški)

26 May 2013 30	Široki Brijeg	4–1	Željezničar	Široki Brijeg
17:00 CET	Ivanković 19'; Serdarušić 22'; Brekalo (yellow card) 39'; Kordić 54' (pen.), 69'; Ljubić (yellow card) 90'		Adilović 40' (pen.); Kerla (yellow card) 71'; Pehilj (yellow card) 82'	Stadium: Pecara Stadium; Attendance: L Referee: Ognjen Valjić (Banja Luka)

=== Kup Bosne i Hercegovine ===
==== Round of 32 ====
19 September 2012	Sloboda Mrkonjić Grad	0–3	Željezničar	Mrkonjić Grad
16:00 CEST	Miletić (red card) 25'; Tadić (yellow card) 27'; Bereta (yellow card) 89'	Report	Adilović 38'; Stanić (yellow card) 59'; Zeba 60'; Brković 63'	Stadium: Gradski Stadion Luke; Attendance: 1,200; Referee: Dragan Skakić (Gradiška)

==== Round of 16 ====
3 October 2012 First leg	Slavija	1–3	Željezničar	Istočno Sarajevo
15:30 CEST	Rašević 7'; Dudo (yellow card) 21'; Kokot (yellow card) 23'; Aleksić (yellow card) 49'; Mijatović (yellow card) 90'	Report	Adilović 17', 42'; Stanić (yellow card) 27' (yellow-red card) 45'; Svraka (yellow card) 62'; Bekrić 77'	Stadium: Gradski SRC Slavija; Attendance: 600; Referee: Dragan Skakić (Gradiška)

23 October 2012 Second leg	Željezničar	3–0 (6 - 1 agg.)	Slavija	Sarajevo
18:00 CEST	Selimović 21', 41', (yellow card) 58'; Svitlica ?' (o.g.)	Report	Benović (yellow card) 15'; Popović (yellow card) 58'; Papaz (yellow card) 80'	Stadium: Grbavica Stadium; Attendance: 3,000; Referee: Ilija Živković (Orašje)

==== Quarter-finals ====
7 November 2012 First leg	Olimpic	0–1	Željezničar	Sarajevo
13:30 CET	Salčinović (yellow card) 35'; Vidović (yellow card) 70'; Ivetić (yellow card) 75'	Report	Jamak (yellow card) 54'; Vasilić (yellow card) 61' (yellow-red card) 76'; Bekrić 87', (yellow card) 89'	Stadium: Stadion Otoka; Attendance: 1,200; Referee: Emir Alečković (Sarajevo)

21 November 2012 Second leg	Željezničar	3–0 (4 - 0 agg.)	Olimpic	Sarajevo
17:00 CET	Jamak 47', 56'; Zolotić (yellow card) 48'; Adilović 90'	Report	Regoje (yellow card) 32'; Đurić (yellow card) 54'; Đorđević (yellow card) 89'; Vidović (yellow card) 90'	Stadium: Grbavica Stadium; Attendance: 1,500; Referee: Eldis Prošić (Cazin)

==== Semi-finals ====
13 March 2013 First leg	Željezničar	0–0	Zrinjski	Sarajevo
18:00 CET	Stanić (yellow card) 14'; Bekrić (red card) 31'; Kerla (yellow card) 75'	Report	Marković (yellow card) 43'; Šćepanović (yellow card) 47'; Graovac (yellow card) 48' (yellow-red card) 70'; Žuržinov (yellow card) 75'	Stadium: Grbavica Stadium; Attendance: 2,500; Referee: Ognjen Valjić (Banja Luka)

3 April 2013 Second leg	Zrinjski	0–2 (0 - 2 agg.)	Željezničar	Mostar
17:00 CET	Radeljić (yellow card) 15'; Stojkić (yellow card) 45+3'; Sesar (yellow card) 52'; Arežina (yellow card) 84'	Report	Adilović 45+2'; Stanić 57', (yellow card) 85'; Bogičević (yellow card) 73'; Antolović (yellow card) 76'	Stadium: Bijeli Brijeg Stadium; Attendance: 3,000; Referee: Vladimir Bjelica (Istočno Sarajevo)

==== Final ====
30 April 2013 First leg	Željezničar	1–1	Široki Brijeg	Sarajevo
18:00 CET	E. Čolić 19'; Svraka (yellow card) 27'; Urdinov (yellow card) 46'	Report	Kordić 6'	Stadium: Grbavica Stadium; Attendance: 4,300; Referee: Tomislav Ćuić (Tomislavgrad)

14 May 2013 Second leg	Široki Brijeg	1–1 (2–2 agg.) (5–4 p)	Željezničar	Široki Brijeg
19:00 CET	Bertoša (yellow card) 25'; Wagner 63'; Zlomislić (yellow card) 65'; Ljubić (yellow card) 86'	Report	Vasilić (yellow card) 87'; Pehilj 90+1'	Stadium: Pecara Stadium; Attendance: 3,500; Referee: Edin Jakupović (Bihać)
	Penalties
	Šilić (penalty scored); Kordić (penalty scored); Wagner (penalty scored); Ješe (penalty missed); Zlomislić (penalty missed); Džidić (penalty scored); Lendeka (penalty scored)		(penalty missed) Pehilj; (penalty missed) Adilović; (penalty scored) B. Čolić; (penalty scored) Stanić; (penalty scored) Hasanović; (penalty scored) Smajić; (penalty missed) Svraka

=== UEFA Champions League ===
==== Second qualifying round ====
18 July 2012 First leg	Maribor (Slovenia)	4–1	(Bosnia and Herzegovina) Željezničar	Maribor, Slovenia
20:00 CEST	Berić 47', 76'; Mezga 67' (pen.); Rajčević (yellow card) 90'; Tavares 92+2'	Report	Adilović 15', (yellow card) 55'; Svraka (yellow card) 18'; Kerla (yellow card) 37'; Bogičević (yellow card) 66'; Jamak (yellow card) 69'	Stadium: Ljudski vrt Attendance: 10,251; Referee: Thorsten Kinhöfer (Germany)

24 July 2012 Second leg	Željezničar (Bosnia and Herzegovina)	1–2 (2 - 6 agg.)	(Slovenia) Maribor	Sarajevo, Bosnia and Herzegovina
21:00 CEST	B. Čolić (yellow card) 2' (yellow-red card) 53'; Bešlija (yellow card) 14'; Zolotić (yellow card) 39'; Kerla (yellow card) 44'; Adilović (yellow card) 54'; Kvesić 59'; Stanić (red card) 61'; Svraka (yellow card) 63' (yellow-red card) 64'; Bekrić (yellow card) 65'	Report	Ibraimi 20'; Potokar (yellow card) 52'; Tavares 86'	Stadium: Asim Ferhatović Hase; Attendance: 10,000; Referee: Danny Makkelie (Netherlands)
