= 2012 Bosnia and Herzegovina Football Cup final =

- Event: 2011–12 Bosnia and Herzegovina Football Cup
Željezničar	Široki Brijeg
1	0

First leg
Željezničar	Široki Brijeg
1	0
- Date: 18:30, 25 April 2012 (+02:00)
- Venue: Grbavica, Sarajevo
- Referee: Vladimir Bjelica
- Attendance: 4,000
- Weather: Sunny and clear

Second leg
Široki Brijeg	Željezničar
0	0
- Date: 20:00, 16 May 2012 (+02:00)
- Venue: Pecara, Široki Brijeg
- Referee: Radoslav Vukasović
- Attendance: 2,000
- Weather: Cloudy and mild

The 2012 Bosnia and Herzegovina Football Cup final will be the 17th final of the Bosnia and Herzegovina Football Cup, the highest football cup competition in Bosnia and Herzegovina.

The date of both 2012 Final matches, as in all the recent years, is set so that it avoids clashes with Premier League of Bosnia and Herzegovina fixtures. Both matches took on Wednesday, between two rounds of the Premier League of Bosnia and Herzegovina.

The current holders, Željezničar, defended their title and brought home the fifth cup title it their history. Winning this cup, they also completed the double, as they already won the Premier League of Bosnia and Herzegovina, their second double in history and the first double any team won since the unification of the Premier league in 2002.

== Route to the Final ==
=== Željezničar ===
Since all clubs started the competition from round of 32, so did Željezničar, the defending champions, also. Their first opponent was Leotar. In single fixture game on Grbavica stadium, they secured their position in the next round. Zdravko Šaraba made a foul on Vernes Selimović in the penalty area, which Zajko Zeba pointed for 1–0 in the 43-minute. Seconds before the halftime, Željezničars goalkeeper, Elvis Karić, boxed the ball to avoid danger, but outside the 16 meter box, earning a direct red card. His place was taken over by the veteran Adnan Gušo, with the captain, Mirsad Bešlija, leaving the field as a substitute. The final score was set by Muamer Svraka, who came in the game just two minutes before that, in the 73-minute for 2–0.

In round of 16, Željezničar played against their city rival, Olimpic. From this round on, two-legged fixtures were played. In the first-leg, played on Grbavica stadium, the first goal fell in the 39-minute, after a free kick from Mirsad Bešlija was scored with a header from Eldin Adilović. The second goal was assisted by Zajko Zeba, once more from a free kick, which Jadranko Bogičević scored, and once again with a header, in 54-minute. The last goal, for a comfortable 3–0 win before the rematch, was scored by Patrick Nyema Gerhardt in the 78-minute also with a header. The rematch was played three weeks later, on Otoka stadium. The spectators waited until the 67-minute for the first goal when Sulejman Smajić found Zajko Zeba who scored for 0–1. Until the end of the game, Olimpic made the equalizer in 78-minute over Admir Raščić ending the black statistic of Olimpic in matches against Željezničar since this was the first match they didn't lost against them. That goal, as proved later, will be the only one Željezničar concede on his route to final.

Round	Opposition	Score
Round of 32	Leotar (h)	2–0
Round of 16	Olimpic (h)	3–0
Round of 16	Olimpic (a)	1–1
Quarter-finals	Čelik (h)	2–0
Quarter-finals	Čelik (a)	0–0
Semi-finals	Borac (h)	1–0
Semi-finals	Borac (a)	0–3 (forfeit)

In the quarter-finals, the two finalists from last year met. Željezničar faced Čelik with the first-leg played on Grbavica yet again. Eldin Adilović, striker who came the last summer exactly from Čelik, scored very early for 1–0 against his former club, in the 16-minute. In the second half, Čelik went in offensive, but in the midst of his attacks, Željezničar scored for the second goal. This time it was Vernes Selimović who scored for the final 2–0 in 64-minute. In the rematch played in Zenica, on Bilino Polje stadium, a goalless match was seen, mostly thanks to the bad pitch left after a qualifying match of Bosnia and Herzegovina against Luxembourg in bad weather and another game in the playoff against Portugal made it just worse. Čelik had more of the game, with Željezničar endangering their goal from time to time but none of teams had the concentration for a goal.

New record snowfalls in many regions of Bosnia and Herzegovina delayed the original date for first-leg of the semi-finals by a week. Željezničar met Borac, a team they faced also in the last two season of this competition (once in final). The first match, played on Grbavica, was an unattractive one, with the pitch still in bad shape because of the massive snow. Jadranko Bogičević was sent off after 75 minutes because of a second yellow card, but Željezničar still managed to win with a late goal by Zajko Zeba in the 87th minute when Marijan Antolović reacted badly. The second-leg was played three weeks later on City Stadium of Banja Luka. The game started very offensive from both side, but the first goal came in the last minute of the first half after a disputable foul over Muamer Svraka. Zajko Zeba managed to score from the free-kick 17 meters away from the goal for 0–1 for Željezničar. The game didn't reached the end of the second half, as the assistant referee was hit in 65-minute by a solid object from the east stand were the ultras fan of Borac are located. While the referee received medical care, the delegate first decided to empty the east stand but then aborted the match. The day after the match, the disciplinary and contest commission decided to award Željezničar with a 0–3 win and punished Borac with a €5,000 fine and the next six home matches without spectators.

=== Široki Brijeg ===
In the single fixture round of 32, Široki Brijeg faced on Pecara stadium, their home venue, Kozara. Kozara proved to be not a challenge for Široki Brijeg, as they won the match with 3–0. The first goal was scored by Jure Ivanković in 18-minute, with Hrvoje Mišić raising to 2–0 in 35-minute. Only two minutes before the final whistle, Juan Manuel Varea scored for 3–0.

Round	Opposition	Score
Round of 32	Kozara (h)	3–0
Round of 16	Slavija (a)	1–2
Round of 16	Slavija (h)	4–2
Quarter-finals	Krajišnik (a)	1–1
Quarter-finals	Krajišnik (h)	0–0
Semi-finals	Velež (h)	1–0
Semi-finals	Velež (a)	0–1

Their opponent for the advancement in quarter-finals was Slavija. In the first leg on Gradski SRC Slavija Stadium in Lukavica, Slavija got in lead in 20-minute over Ljubiša Vukelj and that was the result of the first halftime. In the second halftime, Široki Brijeg succeeded to turn over the result with two goals of Varea. The first goal was scored in 70-minute while the second goal came just seven minutes later. In the rematch played in Široki Brijeg, Slavija once more succumbed to Široki Brijeg. Just as the match started, Široki Brijeg got in lead. In the second minute of the game Ivica Džidić scored for the 1–0. Already in eight-minute it was 2–0, the scorer was Dalibor Šilić. Till the end of the first-half, Široki Brijeg scored two more goals, first in 35-minute over Wagner Santos Lago and four-minute later over Juan Manuel Varea. Slavija lowered to 4–1 in 57-minute with a goal from Marko Perišić and then seven minutes later on 4–2 over Nemanja Šešlija.

In the quarter-finals, Široki got as opponent a team from the second league tier, Krajišnik. The first match played before full stadium in Velika Kladuša ended without a winner. Krajišnik got in lead in 38-minute over Šaban Pehilj, Željezničars footballer on loan, but Hrvoje Mišić scored the equalizer for Široki Brijeg in 86-minute of the game for the final 1–1. The rematch played three weeks later on Pecara stadium ended in a goalless tie and Široki Brijeg advanced further because of the away goal.

In the last hurdle before the final, Široki Brijeg faced Velež. The first leg on Pecara stadium ended with a 1–0 win. Mateo Roskam was successful in 83-minute with a header against former Široki Brijeg goalkeeper Dejan Bandović. Despite many chances Velež created, they were not able to score a goal against Luka Bilobrk and the defense of Široki Brijeg. The second-leg on Vrapčići stadium showed that Široki Brijeg is the better of the two, once more. This time Široki Brijeg was the dominant one throughout the match but still won the rematch with only a one-goal margin. Mario Kvesić scored for 0–1 in the 69-minute, sealing the fate of Velež and securing his team the final of the Bosnia and Herzegovina Football Cup for the fourth time.

== Pre-match ==
This final marked the eighth appearance in the final of the Bosnia and Herzegovina Football Cup for Željezničar and the ninth final in domestic cups, since they were once in the final of the Yugoslav Cup. They had won the cup four times (in 2000, 2001, 2003 and 2011) and were beaten on four occasions (in 1981, 1997, 2002 and 2010). On the other side, this would be the fourth final for Široki Brijeg and they won it once (in 2007), with two finals lost (in 2005 and 2006). This was the first time these two clubs met each other in the final of this competition, while it was the fifth overall encounter in this competition (they met each other before three times in semi-finals and once in quarter-finals).

On 10 April 2012, a draw to decide who would be the first host was held with Željezničar hosting the first leg on 25 April and Široki Brijeg the rematch three weeks later on 17 May, with both matches aired on BHT1. There were some speculations that the first leg would be postponed to 26 April to avoid clashes with the semifinal of the Champions League, but in the end, the first leg remained on the same date with the kick off at 18:30. Unlike the two last finals, in which Željezničar also played, this time the ticket price wasn't raised but rather remained the same as the prices for the regular tickets for the league matches, €2,5 for the south stand (the stand were The Maniacs are), €4 for the north stand and €5 for the west stand. Also, organized attendance of away fans were not allowed as the ban on organized arriving of away fans was in force since October 2011 and was still not lifted by the Football Federation of Bosnia and Herzegovina.

The kick off for the second leg was set at 20:00, on Wednesday 16 May. Just like in the first leg, no organized attendance of away fans was allowed. Two days before the match, on 14 May, Željezničars players went to Hercegovina, Međugorje, where they had their last trainings. They also wanted to accommodate to the surrounding and weather, but also to be close to the city of Široki Brijeg. They decided to leave Sarajevo earlier that day then planned because of sudden unseasonal snowfall. Before the match, Željezničar was in a more than a 3-year unbeaten streak in national cup, with the last lost match dating to 24 September 2008 against Zvijezda in the first round of 2008–09 Bosnia and Herzegovina Football Cup. Since then, they played 26 matched in the national cup, winning in 16 of those matches and drawing 10, with a goal difference of 45 to 8. They won two of the last three national cups, since they lost the final in 2009–10 Bosnia and Herzegovina Football Cup to Borac on an aggregate score of 3:3 after two draw matches. Borac won the cup because of more scored away goals.

== Matches ==
Both team managers said that in the final the two best clubs of the season are clashing and that these are probably the most important matches of the season for both clubs since the teams almost already secured a place in European competition at that moment. They also said that the biggest motive will be to gain a trophy and that only small differences and luck will decide the winner. None of the sides had bigger problems with bookings or injuries for the first leg. Nevertheless, manager of Široki Brijeg, Marijan Bloudek, admitted that Željezničar is the better side at the moment, with the many records and the league position proving that, but with his team very close behind and with realistic chances to win.

Before the second leg, the atmosphere in Široki Brijeg was intense, since if their team wins, this would be the first trophy in five years. Škripari, the ultras fan of the team, made some announcements before the match to bring more people to the stadium. Many managers and sport workers came to the final, not only from Bosnia and Herzegovina but also from the region. Both teams had much respect for the opponent and said for them that they are, along with them, the best team in the league this year and that only small differences and luck will decide the winner, but again that their team will have more reasons to be happy at the end of the match, which could have been seen in the comment the managers given to the press. While Široki Brijeg didn't have any problems with suspended or injured players, Patrick Nyema Gerhardt, Željezničar's standard player, would miss the game because of booking.

=== Report for the first leg ===
==== Details for the first leg ====
25 April 2012
18:30 CEST

Željezničar	1–0	Široki Brijeg
Svraka 33'	Report

Grbavica Stadium, Sarajevo
Attendance: 4,000
Referee: Vladimir Bjelica (I. Sarajevo)

Željezničar	Široki Brijeg

GK	1	(Bosnia and Herzegovina) Adnan Gušo
RB	3	(Bosnia and Herzegovina) Josip Kvesić
CB	6	(Bosnia and Herzegovina) Jadranko Bogičević
CB	19	(Bosnia and Herzegovina) Velibor Vasilić
LB	17	(Bosnia and Herzegovina) Benjamin Čolić
DM	15	(Liberia) Patrick Nyema Gerhardt	(yellow card) ?'
DM	23	(Bosnia and Herzegovina) Muamer Svraka	(yellow card) ?'
AM	16	(Bosnia and Herzegovina) Vernes Selimović
RW	90	(Bosnia and Herzegovina) Samir Bekrić		(substituted off) 62'
LW	10	(Bosnia and Herzegovina) Zajko Zeba (c)		(substituted off) 87'
CF	9	(Bosnia and Herzegovina) Eldin Adilović		(substituted off) 74'
Substitutes:
GK	22	(Bosnia and Herzegovina) Semir Bukvić
DF	18	(Bosnia and Herzegovina) Josip Ćutuk
MF	8	(Bosnia and Herzegovina) Nermin Zolotić
MF	24	(Bosnia and Herzegovina) Nermin Jamak		(substituted on) 87'
MF	20	(Bosnia and Herzegovina) Mirsad Bešlija		(substituted on) 62'
FW	2	(Bosnia and Herzegovina) Elvir Čolić		(substituted on) 74'
FW	14	(Bosnia and Herzegovina) Mirsad Ramić
Manager:
(Bosnia and Herzegovina) Amar Osim

GK	12	(Bosnia and Herzegovina) Luka Bilobrk
RB	6	(Croatia) Mateo Bertoša
CB	8	(Croatia) Vedran Ješe
CB	5	(Bosnia and Herzegovina) Slavko Brekalo
LB	16	(Bosnia and Herzegovina) Dino Ćorić	(yellow card) ?'
DM	2	(Brazil) Marciano
DM	11	(Brazil) Jefthon	(yellow card) ?'	(substituted off) 90'
AM	21	(Bosnia and Herzegovina) Goran Zakarić	(yellow card) ?'	(substituted off) 62'
RW	19	(Argentina) Juan Manuel Varea		(substituted off) 75'
LW	15	(Brazil) Wagner Santos Lago
CF	10	(Bosnia and Herzegovina) Dalibor Šilić (c)
Substitutes:
GK	1	(Croatia) Nikola Marić
DF	?
DF	?
MF	22	(Bosnia and Herzegovina) Mario Kvesić		(substituted on) 90'
MF	?
MF	18	(Bosnia and Herzegovina) Jure Ivanković		(substituted on) 75'
FW	19	(Croatia) Mateo Roskam		(substituted on) 62'
Manager:
(Slovenia) Marijan Bloudek

Match officials

- Assistant referees:
  - Goran Dujak (Odžak)
  - Zlatan Bečirović (Mramor)
- Fourth official: Tomislav Čuić (Tomislavgrad)

Match rules

- 90 minutes.
- Seven named substitutes.
- Maximum of three substitutions.

==== Statistics for first leg ====
	Željezničar	Široki Brijeg
Total shots	7	4
Shots on target	2	0
Ball possession	47%	53%
Corner kicks	6	1
Fouls committed	18	23
Offsides	6	3
Yellow cards	2	3
Red cards	0	0

=== Report for the second leg ===
==== Details for the second leg ====
16 May 2012
20:00 CEST

Široki Brijeg	0–0	Željezničar
	Report

Pecara Stadium, Široki Brijeg
Attendance: 2,000
Referee: Radoslav Vukasović (Trebinje)

Široki Brijeg	Željezničar

GK	12	(Bosnia and Herzegovina) Luka Bilobrk
RB	6	(Croatia) Mateo Bertoša
CB	8	(Croatia) Vedran Ješe	(yellow card) 75'
CB	5	(Bosnia and Herzegovina) Slavko Brekalo
LB	16	(Bosnia and Herzegovina) Dino Ćorić	(yellow card) 92'
DM	2	(Brazil) Marciano	(yellow card) 48'
DF	9	(Brazil) Baiano		(substituted off) 60'
MF	18	(Bosnia and Herzegovina) Jure Ivanković
RW	19	(Argentina) Juan Manuel Varea		(substituted off) 66'
LW	15	(Brazil) Wagner Santos Lago		(substituted off) 77'
CF	10	(Bosnia and Herzegovina) Dalibor Šilić (c)
Substitutes:
GK	1	(Croatia) Nikola Marić
MF	22	(Bosnia and Herzegovina) Mario Kvesić		(substituted on) 77'
MF	4	(Bosnia and Herzegovina) Danijel Kozul
MF	17	(Croatia) Ante Serdarušić
AM	21	(Bosnia and Herzegovina) Goran Zakarić		(substituted on) 60'
FW	19	(Croatia) Mateo Roskam	(yellow card) 66'	(substituted on) 66'
MF	7	(Bosnia and Herzegovina) Mario Ljubić
Manager:
(Slovenia) Marijan Bloudek

GK	1	(Bosnia and Herzegovina) Adnan Gušo	(yellow card) 89'
RB	3	(Bosnia and Herzegovina) Josip Kvesić
CB	6	(Bosnia and Herzegovina) Jadranko Bogičević
CB	5	(Bosnia and Herzegovina) Semir Kerla
LB	17	(Bosnia and Herzegovina) Benjamin Čolić
DM	15	(Bosnia and Herzegovina) Nermin Zolotić
DM	23	(Bosnia and Herzegovina) Muamer Svraka	(yellow card) 65'
AM	16	(Bosnia and Herzegovina) Vernes Selimović	(yellow card) 46'
RW	90	(Bosnia and Herzegovina) Samir Bekrić		(substituted off) 85'
LW	10	(Bosnia and Herzegovina) Zajko Zeba (c)		(substituted off) 90'
CF	9	(Bosnia and Herzegovina) Eldin Adilović		(substituted off) 71'
Substitutes:
GK	22	(Bosnia and Herzegovina) Semir Bukvić
DF	18	(Bosnia and Herzegovina) Josip Ćutuk
MF	11	(Bosnia and Herzegovina) Srđan Stanić		(substituted on) 90'
MF	24	(Bosnia and Herzegovina) Nermin Jamak		(substituted on) 85'
MF	20	(Bosnia and Herzegovina) Mirsad Bešlija		(substituted on) 71'
FW	2	(Bosnia and Herzegovina) Elvir Čolić
FW	14	(Bosnia and Herzegovina) Mirsad Ramić
Manager:
(Bosnia and Herzegovina) Amar Osim

Match officials

- Assistant referees:
  - Momir Širko (Banja Luka)
  - Ratko Kunić (Banja Luka)
- Fourth official: Semir Kaplan (Stolac)

Match rules

- 90 minutes.
- Seven named substitutes.
- Maximum of three substitutions.

==== Statistics for second leg ====
	Široki Brijeg	Željezničar
Total shots	7	11
Shots on target	2	5
Ball possession	55%	45%
Corner kicks	3	3
Fouls committed	23	19
Offsides	2	3
Yellow cards	4	3
Red cards	0	0

== See also ==
- 2011–12 Bosnia and Herzegovina Football Cup
- 2011–12 Premier League of Bosnia and Herzegovina
- Football Federation of Bosnia and Herzegovina
