= 2011–12 Bosnia and Herzegovina Football Cup =

Tournament details
- Country: Bosnia and Herzegovina
- Teams: 32

Final positions
- Champions: Željezničar (5th title)
- Runners-up: Široki Brijeg

Tournament statistics
- Matches played: 46
- Goals scored: 109 (2.37 per match)
- Top goal scorer: Šaban Pehilj (6 goals)

The 2011–12 Bosnia and Herzegovina Football Cup is the seventieth season of Bosnia and Herzegovina's annual football cup, and a twelfth season of the unified competition. The competition started on 14 September 2011 and concluded on 16 May 2012. The winner would have qualified to the second qualifying round of the 2012–13 UEFA Europa League, but as the cup was won by the league champion, the slot went to the second placed team in Premier league of Bosnia and Herzegovina, which was Široki Brijeg who also ended up as the runner-up of the cup.

The defending champions FK Željezničar, having won their 4th title the previous year by defeating NK Čelik in the final with an aggregate score of 4–0, managed to defend their title and claim their fifth one against Široki Brijeg in final which they won 1–0 on aggregate, completing the double for that season as they won the league title four days before the second leg of the final.

All top clubs entered from the first round of 32.

== Participating clubs ==
The following 32 teams competed in Round 1: (Team in bold is the winner)

**2011–12 Premier League** all clubs	**2011–12 Prva liga RS** six clubs	**10 clubs from 2011 Federation of Bosnia and Herzegovina Cup**
Borac; Čelik; GOŠK; Kozara; Leotar; Olimpic; Sloboda; Rudar (P); Sarajevo; Slavija; Široki Brijeg; Travnik; Velež; Zrinjski; Zvijezda; **Željezničar**	Mladost (G); Modriča; Podrinje; Radnik; Sloga; Sutjeska	Branitelj – (2011–12 Prva liga FBiH); Iskra – (2011–12 Prva liga FBiH); Krajišnik – (2011–12 Prva liga FBiH); Rudar (K) – (2011–12 Prva liga FBiH); UNIS – (2011–12 Prva liga FBiH); Vitez – (2011–12 Prva liga FBiH); Brotnjo – (2011–12 Druga liga FBiH – South); Mladost (Ž) – (2011–12 Druga liga FBiH – Center); Dizdaruša – (2011–12 Druga liga FBiH – North); Mramor – (2011–12 Druga liga FBiH – North)

^{1} Of the 32 participants, the Federation of Bosnia and Herzegovina has 20 clubs, while the Republika of Srpska has 11. Brčko District is represented with just one club.

== Calendar ==
Round	Date(s)	Number of fixtures	Clubs	New entries this round
Round of 32	14 September 2011	16	32 → 16	none
Round of 16	28 September and 19 October 2011	8	16 → 8	none
Quarterfinals	2 and 23 November 2011	4	8 → 4	none
Semifinals	14 March and 4 April 2012	2	4 → 2	none
Final	25 April and 16 May 2012	1	2 → 1	none

== Draw ==
The draws for the round of 32 was conducted in Sarajevo at 12:00 (CEST) on 6 September 2011 in hotel "Art". All 32 clubs were in the same pot, resulting that every club could get any other club as his opponent. The first-drawn team served as hosts. Also the date for the matches was decided for 14 September 2011.

The draws for the round of 16 took place on 20 September 2011, once more at 12:00 (CEST) in Sarajevo in hotel "Evropa". The remaining 16 clubs were once more put in just one pot. The date for the matches was also decided and the matches will take part on 28. September, with the rematch 3 weeks later, on 19. October 2011.

The draws for the quarterfinals took place on 25 October 2011. The remaining 8 clubs will found themselves again just in one pot. The date for the matches was also confirmed. The dates were set for 2 November 2011 with the rematch three weeks later on 23 November 2011.

The draws for semifinal was conducted on 6 March 2012 in the halls of the Football Federation of Bosnia and Herzegovina. On the draw it was decided that the first match will be played on 14 March, with the rematch set for 4 April 2012.

The two winners will face each other in the final which is scheduled for 25 April and rematch on 16 May 2012. The host in the first leg was determined by a draw held on 10 April 2012 in the halls of Football Federation of Bosnia and Herzegovina. It was decided that the host of the first leg will be Željezničar, with Široki Brijeg hosting the second leg three weeks later.

== Competition ==
=== Round of 32 ===
This round consisted of 16 single-legged fixtures. All 32 clubs entered the competition from this round, while the matches were played on 14 September 2011. In a case of a draw in the regular time, the winner would have been determined with a penalty shootout.

Tie no	Home team	Score	Away team
1	Rudar (P) (I)	1–0	UNIS (II)
2	Zvijezda (I)	2–0	Sloboda (I)
3	NK Travnik (I)	2–3	Velež (I)
4	Branitelj (II)	4–1	Dizdaruša (III)
5	Slavija (I)	3–0	Modriča (II)
6	Iskra (II)	0–1	Rudar (K) (II)
7	Čelik (I)	4–0	Podrinje (II)
8	Široki Brijeg (I)	3–0	Kozara (I)
9	Olimpic (I)	3–0	Mladost (G) (II)
10	Vitez (II)	0–1	GOŠK (I)
11	Krajišnik (II)	6–0	Mladost (Ž) (III)
12	Sloga (II)	0–1	Sarajevo (I)
13	Mramor (III)	1–0	Radnik (II)
14	Zrinjski (I)	3–0	Sutjeska (II)
15	Borac (I)	3–1	Brotnjo (III)
16	Željezničar (I)	2–0	Leotar (I)

Note: Roman numerals in brackets denote the league tier the clubs participate in during the 2011–12 season.
Source: NFSBiH

=== Round of 16 ===
The 16 winner continued their way to the final through this round. Unlike the last round, this round consisted of 8 two-legged fixtures. The date for the matches were determined with the draw which was held on 20 September. The first match took place on 28 September, while the rematch was scheduled three weeks after, on 19 October 2011.

Team 1	Agg.	Team 2	1st leg	2nd leg
Mramor (III)	2–3	Krajišnik (II)	1–1	1–2
Slavija (I)	3–6	Široki Brijeg (I)	1–2	2–4
Sarajevo (I)	7–5	Rudar (P) (I)	3–0	4–5
Borac (I)	2–0	Zvijezda (I)	2–0	0–0
Željezničar (I)	4–1	Olimpic (I)	3–0	1–1
Zrinjski (I)	0–5^{2}	Velež (I)	0–3^{3}	0–2
Rudar (K) (II)	1–3	Branitelj (II)	0–1	1–2
GOŠK (I)	1–6	Čelik (I)	1–3	0–3

^{1} Roman numerals in brackets denote the league tier the clubs participate in during the 2011–12 season.
^{2} Indicates there is an article about it.
^{3} The match was abandoned after huligans of Zrinjski stormed the pitch and started to chase players of Velež with various items. The field storm took place in the last minutes of the game just after Velež scored for 0–1 against their city rivals. The disciplinary and contest commission decided to award a 0–3 win to Velež, suspended "Bijeli Brijeg", Zrinjski home stadium, for 5 matches and punished Zrinjski with a fine.
Source: NFSBiH

==== First leg ====
28 September 2011	Mramor	1–1	Krajišnik	Mramor
15:30 CEST	Sarajlija 20'	Report	Bešić 27'	Stadium: Stadion NK Mramor; Referee: Vladimir Bjelica (I. Sarajevo)

28 September 2011	Slavija	1–2	Široki Brijeg	Istočno Sarajevo
15:30 CEST	Vukelj 20'	Report	Varea 70', 77'	Stadium: Gradski SRC Slavija stadion Attendance: 200; Referee: Husein Terzić (Travnik)

28 September 2011	Sarajevo	3–0	Rudar (P)	Sarajevo
15:30 CEST	Džafić 1'; Kojašević 15' (pen.); Obuća 65'	Report		Stadium: Asim Ferhatović Hase; Attendance: 1,000; Referee: Vladimir Dominković (Orašje)

28 September 2011	Borac	2–0	Zvijezda	Banja Luka
18:30 CEST	Kajkut 14'; Krunić 27'	Report		Stadium: Gradski stadion Attendance: 0 (stadium suspended); Referee: Semir Kaplan (Stolac)

28 September 2011	Željezničar	3–0	Olimpic	Sarajevo
18:30 CEST	Adilović 39'; Bogičević 54'; Gerhardt 80'	Report		Stadium: Grbavica; Attendance: 3,500; Referee: Predrag Stankić (Bijeljina)

28 September 2011	Zrinjski	0–3 (Match aborted at 0–1^{3})	Velež	Mostar
16:00 CEST		Report	Demić 90+3'	Stadium: Bijeli Brijeg; Attendance: 6,000; Referee: Dragan Skakić (Bosanska Gradiška)

28 September 2011	Rudar (K)	0–1	Branitelj	Kakanj
15:30 CEST		Report	Eminović (? )	Stadium: Pod Vardom; Referee: Edin Jakupović (Bihać)

28 September 2011	GOŠK	1–3	Čelik	Gabela
15:30 CEST	Bošnjak 60'	Report	Vršajević 69'; Schreng 80' (o.g.); Šišić 86'	Stadium: Podavala; Attendance: ~300; Referee: Rusmir Mrković (Sarajevo)

==== Second leg ====
19 October 2011	Krajišnik	2–1 (3–2 agg.)	Mramor	Velika Kladuša
15:00 CEST	Pehilj 58'; Nacimento 70'	Report	Sakić 11'	Stadium: Gradski stadion Referee: Elmir Pilav (Sarajevo)

19 October 2011	Široki Brijeg	4–2 (6–3 agg.)	Slavija	Široki Brijeg
18:00 CEST	Džidić 2'; Šilić 8'; Wagner 35'; Varea 39'	Report	Perišić 57'; Šešlija 64'	Stadium: Pecara; Referee: Ilija Živković (Orašje)

19 October 2011	Rudar (P)	5–4 (5–7 agg.)	Sarajevo	Prijedor
15:00 CEST	Belošević 18' (o.g.); Kantar 37', 42' (pen.); Srndović 45'; Šuka 76'	Report	Obuća 13', 19'; Šćepanović 53'; Suljić 88'	Stadium: Gradski stadion Attendance: ~350; Referee: Husein Terzić (Travnik)

19 October 2011	Zvijezda	0–0 (0–2 agg.)	Borac	Gradačac
15:00 CEST		Report		Stadium: Banja Ilidža; Attendance: 1,000; Referee: Vedran Zovko (Mostar)

19 October 2011	Olimpic	1–1 (1–4 agg.)	Željezničar	Sarajevo
15:00 CEST	Raščić 78'	Report	Zeba 68'	Stadium: Otoka; Attendance: 2,000; Referee: Radoslav Vukasović (Trebinje)

19 October 2011	Velež	2–0 (5–0 agg.)	Zrinjski	Mostar
15:00 CEST	Brković 1'; Kodro 12'	Report		Stadium: Vrapčići; Attendance: 1,500; Referee: Robert Zrilić (Banja Luka)

19 October 2011	Branitelj	2–1 (3–1 agg.)	Rudar (K)	Rodoč
15:00 CEST	Pinjuh 10'; Bebanić 89'	Report	Alagić 26'	Stadium: HNK Branitelj Stadium; Attendance: ~50; Referee: Dragan Petrović (Banja Luka)

19 October 2011	Čelik	3–0 (6–1 agg.)	GOŠK	Kakanj
15:00 CEST	Vršajević 76', 80' (pen.); Stupar 83' (pen.)	Report		Stadium: Pod Vardom; Referee: Edin Jakupović (Bihać)

=== Quarter-finals ===
The 8 winner from the previous round met their opponents in this round on the way to the final. This round consisted of 4 two-legged fixtures. The date for the matches was determined with the draw which was held on 25 October. The first match took place on 2 November, while the rematch was scheduled three weeks after, on 23 November 2011.

Team 1	Agg.	Team 2	1st leg	2nd leg
Krajišnik (II)	1–1 (a)	Široki Brijeg (I)	1–1	0–0
Velež (I)	3–1	Branitelj (II)	2–0	1–1
Željezničar (I)	2–0^{2}	Čelik (I)	2–0	0–0
Sarajevo (I)	0–0 (5–6 p)	Borac (I)	0–0	0–0

^{1} Roman numerals in brackets denote the league tier the clubs participate in during the 2011–12 season.
^{2} Indicates there is an article about it.
Source: NFSBiH

==== First leg ====
2 November 2011	Krajišnik	1–1	Široki Brijeg	Velika Kladuša
13:30 CET	Pehilj 38'	Report	Mišić 86'	Stadium: Gradski stadion Attendance: 3.000; Referee: Rusmir Mrković (Sarajevo)

2 November 2011	Velež	2–0	Branitelj	Mostar
13:30 CET	Rovčanin 12' (pen.); Hasanović 50'	Report		Stadium: Vrapčići; Attendance: 500; Referee: Ognjen Valjić (Banja Luka)

2 November 2011	Željezničar	2–0	Čelik	Sarajevo
18:00 CET	Adilović 16'; Selimović 64'	Report		Stadium: Grbavica; Attendance: 3.000; Referee: Semir Kaplan (Stolac)

2 November 2011	Sarajevo	0–0	Borac	Sarajevo
17:30 CET		Report		Stadium: Asim Ferhatović Hase; Attendance: 2.000; Referee: Vladimir Dominković (Orašje)

==== Second leg ====
23 November 2011	Široki Brijeg	0–0 (1–1 agg.)	Krajišnik	Široki Brijeg
16:00 CET		Report		Stadium: Pecara; Attendance: 300; Referee: Husein Terzić (Travnik)

23 November 2011	Branitelj	1–1 (1–3 agg.)	Velež	Rodoč
13:00 CET	Petrović 62'	Report	Demić 38'	Stadium: HNK Branitelj Stadium; Attendance: 200; Referee: Robert Zrilić (Banja Luka)

23 November 2011	Čelik	0–0 (0–2 agg.)	Željezničar	Zenica
16:30 CET		Report		Stadium: Bilino Polje; Attendance: 1.500; Referee: Edin Jakupović (Bihać)

23 November 2011	Borac	0–0 (0–0 agg.) (6–5 p)	Sarajevo	Banja Luka
16:00 CET		Report		Stadium: Gradski stadion Attendance: 3.000; Referee: Tomislav Čuić (Tomislavgrad)
	Penalties
	Kajkut (penalty missed); Maksimović (penalty scored); Krunić (penalty missed); Grahovac (penalty scored); Stajić (penalty scored); Rapsudić (penalty scored); Stakić (penalty scored); Žarić (penalty scored)		(penalty scored) Torlak; (penalty missed) Sesar; (penalty scored) Belošević; (penalty missed) Bajraktarević; (penalty scored) Handžić; (penalty scored) Zrnanović; (penalty scored) Haskić; (penalty missed) Dupovac

=== Semi-finals ===
The remaining 4 teams will play in this last round before the final. It will consist of 2 two-legged fixtures which will take part on 14 March and 4 April this year. The draw was done on 6 March.

Team 1	Agg.	Team 2	1st leg	2nd leg
Željezničar	4–0	Borac	1–0	3–0^{2}
Široki Brijeg	2–0	Velež	1–0	1–0

^{1} All teams are from Premier League of Bosnia and Herzegovina, the first league tier.
^{2} The game on Gradski stadion in Banja Luka was stopped in the 65-minute by result 0–1 for Željezničar when one of the assistant referees was hit by a solid object in the head. While medical care was given to the referee, the delegate first decided to empty the east stand, the stand where Lešinars (the ultras fans of Borac) are, where the object came from, but not long after, realizing the tension, because, as they say, "weird" actions by the main referee, while the east stand was emptying out, the delegate aborted the match. The disciplinary and contest commission decided to award Željezničar a 0–3 win and to punish Borac with a €5,000 fine and the next six home matches without spectators.
Source: NFSBiH

==== First leg ====
14 March 2012	Željezničar	1–0	Borac	Sarajevo
17:00 CET	Bogičević (yellow card) 75' (red card); Zeba 87'	Report		Stadium: Grbavica; Attendance: 3.000; Referee: Predrag Stankić (Bijeljina)

14 March 2012	Široki Brijeg	1–0	Velež	Široki Brijeg
15:00 CET	Roskam 83'	Report		Stadium: Pecara; Attendance: 1.000; Referee: Elmir Pilav (Sarajevo)

==== Second leg ====
4 April 2012	Borac	0–3 (Match aborted at 0–1^{2}) (0–4 agg.)	Željezničar	Banja Luka
17:00 CEST		Report	Zeba 45'	Stadium: Gradski stadion Attendance: 3.000; Referee: Midhat Arnautović (Lukavac)

4 April 2012	Velež	0–1 (0–2 agg.)	Široki Brijeg	Mostar
16:00 CEST		Report	Kvesić 69'	Stadium: Vrapčići; Attendance: 4.000; Referee: Tomislav Čuić (Tomislavgrad)

=== Final ===
The final was contested between Željezničar and Široki Brijeg and played over a two-legged fixture. The date for the finals was set for 25 April and 16 May 2012.

Team 1	Agg.	Team 2	1st leg	2nd leg
Željezničar	1–0	Široki Brijeg	1–0	0–0^{2}

^{1} Both teams are from Premier League of Bosnia and Herzegovina, the first league tier.
^{2} Široki Brijeg was fined with 1500 € and the next home match without spectators because of oversights made in organization of the second leg of the final, including hitting Amar Osim with a solid object from the stands, a try by a supporter to trip the assistant referee nearly at the end of the game and very insulting chanting.
Source: NFSBiH

==== First leg ====
25 April 2012	Željezničar	1–0	Široki Brijeg	Sarajevo
18:30 CEST	Svarka 33'	Report		Stadium: Grbavica; Attendance: 4,000; Referee: Vladimir Bjelica (I. Sarajevo)

==== Second leg ====
16 May 2012	Široki Brijeg	0–0 (0–1 agg.)	Željezničar	Široki Brijeg
20:00 CEST		Report		Stadium: Pecara; Attendance: 2,000; Referee: Radoslav Vukasović (Trebinje)

== Top goalscorers ==
Rank	Player	Club	Goals
1	(Bosnia and Herzegovina) Šaban Pehilj	Krajišnik/Kozara^{1}	6
2	(Argentina) Juan Manuel Varea	Široki Brijeg	4
3	(Bosnia and Herzegovina) Edin Bebanić	Branitelj	3
3	(Bosnia and Herzegovina) Avdija Vršajević	Čelik	3
3	(Bosnia and Herzegovina) Emir Obuća	Sarajevo	3
3	(Bosnia and Herzegovina) Branko Šešlija	Slavija	3
3	(Bosnia and Herzegovina) Zajko Zeba	Željezničar	3
4	(Serbia) Nemanja Vidaković	Borac	2
4	(Bosnia and Herzegovina) Jure Glavina	Branitelj	2
4	(Bosnia and Herzegovina) Dejan Martinović	Čelik	2
4	(Bosnia and Herzegovina) Vedran Kantar	Rudar (P)	2
4	(Croatia) Hrvoje Mišić	Široki Brijeg	2
4	(Bosnia and Herzegovina) Eldin Adilović	Željezničar	2
5	64 players	1	
-	2 player	OG	

- ^{1} Šaban Pehilj is a footballer of Željezničar. In the first halfseason he was loaned to Krajišnik, while in the second halfseason he was loaned to Kozara. He scored all of his goals for Krajišnik and hasn't played a single game in this competition for Kozara.

== Media coverage ==
Only from quarter-finals and onwards selected matches were broadcast in B&H by BHT1 and Moja TV. BHT1 broadcast 4 live games, including both final matches, while Moja TV broadcast 2 live games.

These matches were broadcast live on television:

Round	BHT1	Moja TV
Quarter-finals	–	Borac v Sarajevo (rematch); Čelik v Željezničar (rematch)
Semi-finals	Željezničar v Borac (first match); Borac v Željezničar (rematch)	
Final	Željezničar v Široki Brijeg (first match); Široki Brijeg v Željezničar (rematch)	–

== See also ==
- 2011–12 Premier League of Bosnia and Herzegovina
- 2011–12 First League of the Federation of Bosnia and Herzegovina
- 2011–12 First League of the Republika Srpska
- 2010–11 Kup Bosne i Hercegovine
- Football Federation of Bosnia and Herzegovina
