= Marijan Bloudek =

Slovenian footballer and manager (born 1951)

Personal information
- Date of birth: 23 August 1951 (age 75)
- Place of birth: Zenica, FPR Yugoslavia
- Position: Defender

Senior career*
Years	Team	Apps	(Gls)
1968–1974	Rudar Kakanj		
1974–1983	Čelik Zenica		

Managerial career
- 1988–1989: Čelik Zenica
- 1989–1993: Maribor
- 1994–1995: Maribor
- 2002: Šmartno ob Paki
- 2008–2009: Čelik Zenica
- 2009–2010: Paloma Sladki Vrh
- 2010: Zrinjski Mostar
- 2012: Široki Brijeg
- 2014: Pomorac 1921
- 2019: Sloboda Tuzla
- * Club domestic league appearances and goals

Marijan Bloudek (born 23 August 1951) is a Slovenian professional football manager and former player of Bosnian descent.

As a player he played for Rudar Kakanj and Čelik Zenica, while as a manager, Bloudek managed Čelik in the Yugoslav First League, Maribor, with whom he won the 1991–92 Slovenian Cup, Šmartno ob Paki, Paloma Sladki Vrh, Zrinjski Mostar, Široki Brijeg, Pomorac 1921 and most recently, Sloboda Tuzla.

== Honours ==
=== Player ===
Čelik Zenica

- Yugoslav Second League: 1978–79 (West), 1982–83 (West)
- UEFA Intertoto Cup: 1975

=== Manager ===
Maribor

- Slovenian Cup: 1991–92

Široki Brijeg

- Bosnian Cup runner-up: 2011–12
