= Nikola Schreng =

Croatian footballer

Personal information
- Date of birth: 15 July 1982 (age 44)
- Place of birth: Velika Gorica, SFR Yugoslavia
- Height: 1.97 m (6 ft 5 1/2 in)
- Position: Goalkeeper

Team information
- Current team: VfR Stockach
- Number: 1

Youth career
- NK Radnik
- Hrvatski Dragovoljac

Senior career*
Years	Team	Apps	(Gls)
2001–2005	Hrvatski Dragovoljac	4+	(0+)
2005–2007	Posušje	31	(0)
2007–2008	Gabela		
2008–2009	Posušje	10	(0)
2009	Hrvatski Dragovoljac	2	(0)
2009–2010	Košice	11	(0)
2010–2011	Wangen	2	(0)
2011–2012	Gabela	27	(0)
2012-2014	NK Klas		
2015	UFC St. Jakob im Walde	13	(0)
2015-	VfR Stockach	108	(0)

International career
1999–2000	Croatia U-19	0	(0)
- * Club domestic league appearances and goals as of 31 August 2012

Nikola Schreng (born 15 July 1982 in Velika Gorica) is a Croatian football goalkeeper, who plays for German amateur side VfR Stockach 09 e.V..

== Career ==
Schreng had a spell at Austrian side UFC St. Jakob im Walde in 2015.

== Career statistics ==
Club	Season	League		Cup		Europe		Total	
Club	Season	Pld	GA	Pld	GA	Pld	GA	Pld	GA
MFK Košice	2009/10	11	21	1	2	4	11	16	34
Total		11	21	1	2	4	11	16	34

^{Last updated: 14 December 2009}
