= NK Mramor =

- Full name: Nogometni Klub Mramor
- Nickname(s): Kopači (Miners)
- Founded: 1953; 72 years ago
- Ground: Stadion Mramor
- Capacity: 700
- Chairman: Salih Delić
- Manager: Meho Zahirović
- League: Second League FBiH
- 2012–13: 8th
- Website: https://www.facebook.com/NKMramor
Home colours	Away colours	Third colours

Nogometni Klub Mramor (English: Football Club Mramor), commonly referred to as NK Mramor or simply Mramor, is a Bosnian football club from the settlement of Mramor near Tuzla, which currently plays in the Second League FBiH.
