= Luka Bilobrk =

Bosnian footballer

Personal information
- Date of birth: 8 December 1985 (age 40)
- Place of birth: Travnik, SFR Yugoslavia
- Height: 1.97 m (6 ft 6 in)
- Position: Goalkeeper

Team information
- Current team: Radnik Bijeljina
- Number: 30

Youth career
- –2006: Travnik

Senior career*
Years	Team	Apps	(Gls)
2006–2008	Travnik	26	(0)
2008	Bjelovar		
2008	Križevci		
2009–2011	Čelik Zenica	53	(0)
2011	Gleinstätten	9	(0)
2012	Sturm Graz Amateure	3	(0)
2012–2019	Široki Brijeg	128	(0)
2019–2020	Radnik Bijeljina	18	(0)
2020–2021	Horn	13	(0)
2021	Radnik Bijeljina	11	(0)
2021	Bjelovar		
- * Club domestic league appearances and goals as of 20 March 2021

Luka Bilobrk (born 8 December 1985) is a Bosnian former professional footballer who played as a goalkeeper.

== Club career ==
On 24 August 2020, Bilobrk joined Austrian club Horn.

On 1 February 2021, he returned to Bosnian Premier League club Radnik Bijeljina. Bilobrk debuted in a league game against Velež Mostar on 27 February 2021.

== Honours ==
Travnik

- First League of FBiH: 2006–07

Široki Brijeg

- Bosnian Cup: 2012–13, 2016–17
