= Goran Marković (footballer) =

Serbian footballer (1986–2019)

Personal information
- Full name: Goran Marković
- Date of birth: 9 February 1986
- Place of birth: Pančevo, SFR Yugoslavia
- Date of death: 13 October 2019 (aged 33)
- Place of death: Pančevo, Serbia
- Height: 1.83 m (6 ft 0 in)
- Positions: Right back; defensive midfielder

Senior career*
Years	Team	Apps	(Gls)
2003–2004	Dinamo Pančevo	12	(1)
2004–2005	Glogonj	18	(0)
2005–2006	PSK Pančevo	21	(1)
2006	Radnik Bijeljina	8	(0)
2007	Obilić	7	(0)
2007–2009	Čukarički	54	(1)
2009–2010	Zrinjski Mostar	26	(0)
2010–2012	Željezničar Sarajevo	24	(1)
2012–2013	Zrinjski Mostar	16	(1)
2014–2016	Jedinstvo Bihać	47	(5)
2016–2017	Slavija Sarajevo	15	(0)
2018	Metalleghe	6	(0)
Total		254	(10)
- * Club domestic league appearances and goals

Goran Marković (Serbian Cyrillic: Горан Марковић; 2 February 1986 – 13 October 2019) was a Serbian professional footballer.

== Club career ==
After playing in a number of local clubs in his birth-town area, in 2006 he moved to Belgrade's second tier club Obilić where after only one season his skills were noted earning him a contract with a Serbian Superliga club Čukarički. After two seasons with Čukarički, in 2009 he moved to Zrinjski Mostar playing in the Premier League of Bosnia and Herzegovina. Next summer, 2010, he signed with another Bosnian top league club, Sarajevo's Željezničar.

== Death ==
On 13 October 2019, Marković died after falling from the fifth floor of an apartment building while repairing a window.

== Honors ==
=== Željezničar ===
- Bosnia and Herzegovina Football Cup (1): 2010–11
- Premier League of Bosnia and Herzegovina (1): 2011–12
