= Ante Serdarušić =

Bosnian Croat footballer

Personal information
- Full name: Ante Serdarušić
- Date of birth: 24 January 1983 (age 43)
- Place of birth: Duvno, SR Bosnia and Herzegovina, SFR Yugoslavia
- Height: 1.82 m (6 ft 0 in)
- Position: Defensive midfielder

Youth career
- 1999–2000: Hajduk Split
- 2001–2001: Trogir

Senior career*
Years	Team	Apps	(Gls)
2001–2008	Posušje	81	(7)
2008–2009	Zrinjski Mostar	22	(1)
2009	Greuther Fürth	1	(0)
2010–2013	Široki Brijeg	46	(2)
2014–2017	Imotski	77	(7)
2017–2019	Croatia Zmijavci		
2020–2021	Posušje		
- * Club domestic league appearances and goals as of 14:24, 12 December 2020 (UTC)

Ante Serdarušić (born 24 January 1983 in Tomislavgrad) is a Croatian retired footballer. He last played for Premijer Liga club Posušje.

== Club career ==
Serdarušić began his career with HNK Hajduk Split. In summer 2002, he joined HNK Trogir. After four years here, he signed with NK Posušje. In June 2008, he came to Zrinjski from NK Posušje and had a trial with Fortuna Düsseldorf on 1 July 2009. On 23 July 2009, he signed for SpVgg Greuther Fürth. After half a year at Fürth, Serdarušić had only played one fixture. As a result of his poor performance, his contract was dissolved on 22 December 2009. In May 2010, he signed with NK Široki Brijeg.

In January 2020, Serdarušić returned to his former club HŠK Posušje.
