= Elvir Čolić =

Bosnian footballer

Personal information
- Full name: Elvir Čolić
- Date of birth: 17 July 1986 (age 40)
- Place of birth: Mostar, SFR Yugoslavia
- Height: 1.84 m (6 ft 1/2 in)
- Position: Right-back

Youth career
- –2006: Velež Mostar

Senior career*
| Years | Team | Apps | (Gls) |
| 2006–2010 | Velež Mostar | 82 | (24) |
| 2008 | → Čelik Zenica (loan) | 13 | (0) |
| 2010–2014 | Željezničar | 49 | (3) |
| 2014–2016 | Zvijezda Gradačac | 40 | (1) |
| 2016–2019 | GOŠK Gabela | 75 | (1) |
| Total | | 259 | (29) |

International career
| 2009 | Bosnia and Herzegovina | 1 | (0) |
- * Club domestic league appearances and goals as of 7 February 2021

Elvir Čolić (born 17 July 1986) is a Bosnian retired footballer who played as a right-back. He most recently played for NK GOŠK Gabela in the First League of FBiH.

== International career ==
He made his debut for Bosnia and Herzegovina in a June 2009 friendly match against Uzbekistan, which remained his sole international appearance.

== Honours ==
Željezničar

- Bosnian Premier League: 2011–12, 2012–13
- Bosnian Cup: 2010–11, 2011–12

GOŠK Gabela

- First League of FBiH: 2016–17
