= Marijan Antolović =

Croatian footballer

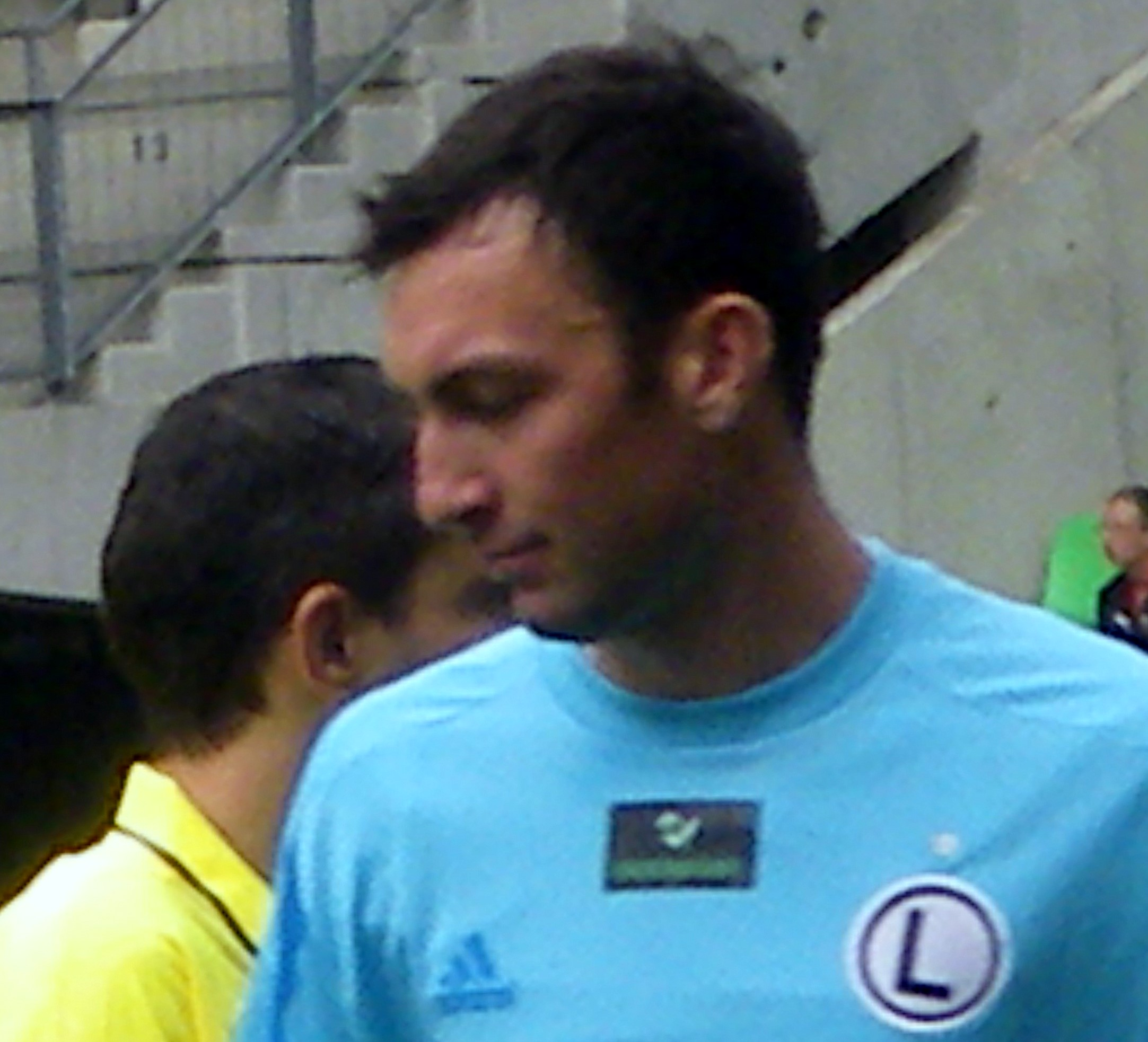
- Antolović with Legia Warszawa

Personal information
- Full name: Marijan Antolović
- Date of birth: 7 May 1989 (age 37)
- Place of birth: Vinkovci, SR Croatia, SFR Yugoslavia
- Height: 1.95 m (6 ft 5 in)
- Position: Goalkeeper

Youth career
- 1998–1999: Bedem Ivankovo
- 1999–2008: Cibalia

Senior career*
Years	Team	Apps	(Gls)
2007–2010	Cibalia	35	(0)
2010–2013	Legia Warsaw	8	(0)
2012	→ Borac Banja Luka (loan)	8	(0)
2012–2013	→ Željezničar Sarajevo (loan)	30	(0)
2013–2015	Željezničar Sarajevo	47	(0)
2016	Hapoel Haifa	10	(0)
2016–2017	Koper	20	(0)
2017–2019	Osijek	0	(0)
2019–2020	Glentoran	29	(0)
2020–2021	Cibalia	3	(0)
Total		190	(0)

International career
2007	Croatia U18	2	(0)
2010	Croatia U21	1	(0)
- * Club domestic league appearances and goals

Marijan Antolović (born 7 May 1989) is a Croatian former professional footballer who played as a goalkeeper.

== Career ==
During the 2009–10 season, Antolović was chosen as part of "the best team / the best 11" ("ideal team") of the first round of 2009–10 season by sports journalists from Index.hr.

The 2009–10 season has seen Antolović achieve more success when he set a historical record in the Croatian First by not conceding a goal in 551 minutes of play. Head coach of Croatian 'A' national team Slaven Bilić informed the Croatian press that he is counting on Antolović in future to become goalkeeper of the Croatia national football team.

== Personal life ==
On 27 November 2014, Antolović received Bosnian citizenship. His family is from Bosnia and Herzegovina; his father is from Žepče and his mother is from Vitez. Antolović is student at the Faculty of Business within the University of Osijek.

== Honours ==
Legia Warsaw

- Polish Cup: 2010–11

Željezničar Sarajevo

- Bosnian Premier League: 2012–13

Glentoran

- Irish Cup: 2019–20
