= NK Krajišnik Velika Kladuša =

Krajišnik Velika Kladuša
- Full name: Nogometni klub Krajišnik Velika Kladuša
- Short name: NKK
- Founded: 1938
- Ground: Gradski stadion (in Velika Kladuša)
- Capacity: 5,000
- Coach: None
- League: Second League of FBiH – West II (none)
Home colours	Away colours

NK Krajišnik Velika Kladuša is a football club from Bosnia and Herzegovina based in Velika Kladuša, established in 1938. After the 2020 season, the club stopped competing in any league due to their financial state.

== Club seasons ==
Season	League									Cup	Europe
Season	Division	P	W	D	L	F	A	Pts	Pos	Cup	Europe
1997–98	Second League of Bosnia and Herzegovina – Central	22	11	3	8	28	18	36	4th		
1998–99	Second League of Bosnia and Herzegovina	22	14	2	6	47	24	44	3rd		
1999–00	Second League of Bosnia and Herzegovina	14	3	2	9	14	24	11	15th		
Current format of Premier League of Bosnia and Herzegovina
2003–04	Second League of FBiH – West	16	12	2	2	42	16	38	1st		
2009–10	First League of FBiH	30	13	5	12	41	50	44	11th		
2010–11	First League of FBiH	30	13	5	12	41	40	44	8th		
2011–12	First League of FBiH	30	12	5	13	41	42	38	12th		
2012–13	First League of FBiH	0	0	0	0	0	0	0	16th ↓		
2016–17	Second League of FBiH – West	24	6	7	11	40	48	25	8th		
2017–18	Second League of FBiH – West	26	10	4	12	35	59	34	11th		
2018–19	Second League of FBiH – West	24	9	2	13	29	46	29	11th		
2019–20	Second League of FBiH – West	14	5	2	7	28	23	17	9th		
2020–21	Second League of FBiH – West II	18	7	2	9	29	41	23	5th		
