= Gradski stadion (Prijedor) =

Multi-purpose stadium in Prijedor, Bosnia and Herzegovina

Coordinates: 44°58′55″N 16°42′29″E

Gradski Stadion
- Interactive map of Gradski Stadion
- Location: Prijedor, Bosnia and Herzegovina
- Owner: FK Rudar Prijedor
- Operator: FK Rudar Prijedor
- Capacity: 3,540

Tenant
- FK Rudar Prijedor

Gradski stadion in Prijedor is a multi-purpose stadium in Prijedor, Bosnia and Herzegovina. It is currently used mostly for football matches and is the home ground of FK Rudar. The stadium can seat 3,540.
