= Ivica Džidić =

Croatian footballer (born 1984)

Personal information
- Date of birth: 8 February 1984 (age 42)
- Place of birth: Mostar, Yugoslavia (now Bosnia and Herzegovina)
- Position: Defender

Youth career
- Dinamo Zagreb

Senior career*
Years	Team	Apps	(Gls)
2003–2008	Zrinjski Mostar		
2008–2009	Mons	8	(0)
2009–2010	Oostende	31	(1)
2010–2015	Široki Brijeg	65	(8)

International career
2004	Croatia U-20	2	(0)
- * Club domestic league appearances and goals

Ivica Džidić (born 8 February 1984) is a Croatian former professional footballer who last played for NK Široki Brijeg.

== Club career ==
He played for Dinamo Zagreb's junior team before returning to Zrinjski as their captain.

He signed for Mons on 30 May 2008. He failed some tests at FC Dender, because of a bad knee, where he wanted to sign a contract for 4 years. In 2010, he joined Široki Brijeg.

== International career ==
Džidić has played for Croatian under-20 national team.
