= Muamer Svraka =

Bosnian footballer (born 1988)

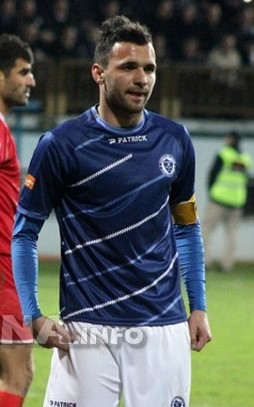
- Svraka playing for Željezničar in 2013

Personal information
- Full name: Muamer Svraka
- Date of birth: 14 February 1988 (age 38)
- Place of birth: Sarajevo, SFR Yugoslavia
- Height: 1.80 m (5 ft 11 in)
- Position: Midfielder

Team information
- Current team: Stupčanica (assistant)

Youth career
- –2008: Željezničar

Senior career*
Years	Team	Apps	(Gls)
2008–2014	Željezničar	129	(29)
2009	→ Travnik (loan)	3	(0)
2014–2015	Paykan	12	(1)
2015–2016	Istra 1961	15	(1)
2016–2017	Semen Padang	11	(0)
2017	Olimpik	12	(4)
2017–2018	Rudeš	6	(0)
2018	Levadia	33	(13)
2018–2019	Birkirkara	0	(0)
2019	→ Triglav (loan)	13	(2)
2020	Gjilani	3	(1)
2020	Krupa	9	(0)
2021–2022	Zvijezda 09	42	(7)
2022–2024	Famos Hrasnica		

International career
2012–2013	Bosnia and Herzegovina	6	(2)

Managerial career
- 2025–2026: Željezničar U19
- * Club domestic league appearances and goals

Muamer Svraka (born 14 February 1988) is a Bosnian football coach and former professional player who played as a midfielder. He is currently an assistant manager at First League of FBiH club Stupčanica.

== Club career ==
Svraka started his career in his hometown club Željezničar. He played for the youth selections of that club until the summer of 2008 when he was promoted, at age 20, to the first team of Željezničar. In his first season, 2008–09, he played six games in the first half-season for Željezničar and, in the second half-season, he played three matches for Travnik, where he was loaned. After returning from the loan, before the start of the 2009–10 season, he became one of the most standard players for Željezničar.

In 2014, Svraka left Željezničar after six years, winning the Bosnian Premier League three times and the Bosnian Cup two times during that period. After leaving Željezničar, he signed a contract with Indonesian club Paykan. After a year in Indonesia, Svraka became the new player of Croatian club Istra 1961.

In 2016, Svraka signed with Indonesia Soccer Championship club Semen Padang. He then came back to Bosnia and Herzegovina and joined Olimpik. After a half of a year he signed for another Croatian club Rudeš. In January 2018, Svraka became the new player of Estonian club Levadia. With Leavdia he won the Estonian Cup and Estonian Supercup.

On 31 December 2018, he left Levadia and signed with Maltese Premier League club Birkirkara While at Birkirkara, on 2 February 2019, Svraka was loaned out to Slovenian PrvaLiga club Triglav Kranj for the remainder of the season. After returning from his loan at Triglav to Birkikara, Svraka had to leave the club in July 2019 after his contract with Birkikara expired. In January 2020, he joined Kosovo Superleague club Gjilani.

On 15 September 2020, Svraka returned to the Bosnian Premier League, signing a contract until the end of the 2020–21 season with Krupa. He made his official debut for Krupa four days later, on 19 September, in a league match against his former club Željezničar. Only three months after joining Krupa, Svraka terminated his contract with the club on 21 December 2020. He joined Zvijezda 09 in February 2021.

Svraka finished his career at Famos Hrasnica in 2024.

== International career ==
Svraka played for the Bosnia and Herzegovina national team between 2012 and 2013. He played in six games and scored two goals. He made his international debut on 31 May 2012, in a friendly match against Mexico on Soldier Field in Chicago.

Svraka scored his first international goal on 14 November 2012, in a 1–0 away win in a friendly against Algeria. His final international was a February 2013 friendly away against Slovenia.

== Coaching career ==
In February 2025, Svraka was appointed head coach of the Željezničar under-19 side. In January 2026, he became an assistant manager at Stupčanica.

== Career statistics ==
=== International goals ===
Scores and results list Bosnia and Herzegovina's goal tally first.

#	Date	Venue	Opponent	Score	Result	Competition
1.	14 November 2012	Stade 5 Juillet 1962, Algiers	Algeria	1–0	1–0	Friendly
2.	6 February 2013	Stožice Stadium, Slovenia	Slovenia	3–0	3–0	Friendly

== Honours ==
Željezničar

- Bosnian Premier League: 2009–10, 2011–12, 2012–13
- Bosnian Cup: 2010–11, 2011–12

Levadia

- Estonian Cup: 2017–18
- Estonian Supercup: 2018
