= Velibor Vasilić =

Bosnian footballer

Personal information
- Date of birth: 13 June 1980 (age 46)
- Place of birth: Tuzla, SFR Yugoslavia
- Height: 1.85 m (6 ft 1 in)
- Position: Defender

Team information
- Current team: SV Kroisegg

Senior career*
Years	Team	Apps	(Gls)
2002–2005	Radnik Bijeljina	80	(3)
2006–2010	Zvijezda Gradačac	46	(1)
2010–2013	Željezničar	58	(0)
2013–2014	TSV Hartberg	19	(0)
2014–2018	FSC Eggendorf	71	(2)
2018–2019	TuS Bad Waltersdorf	1	(0)
2019–	SV Kroisegg	14	(1)

International career^{‡}
2008–2010	Bosnia and Herzegovina	3	(0)
- * Club domestic league appearances and goals as of 1 June 2021 ‡ National team caps and goals as of 26 September 2013

Velibor Vasilić (born 13 June 1980 in Tuzla) is a Bosnian professional footballer currently playing for Austrian amateur side SV Kroisegg.

== International career ==
He made his debut for Bosnia and Herzegovina in an October 2008 World Cup qualification match against Armenia and has earned a total of 3 caps, scoring no goals. His final international was a December 2010 friendly match against Poland.
