= Eldin Adilović =

Bosnian footballer (born 1986)

Personal information
- Date of birth: 8 February 1986 (age 40)
- Place of birth: Zenica, SFR Yugoslavia
- Height: 1.91 m (6 ft 3 in)
- Position: Striker

Youth career
- –2005: Čelik Zenica

Senior career*
Years	Team	Apps	(Gls)
2005–2006	Čelik Zenica	25	(3)
2007–2008	Interblock	17	(8)
2007–2008	→ Ivančna Gorica (loan)	7	(3)
2008–2009	Nafta Lendava	24	(1)
2009	Lustenau 07	2	(1)
2010	Mughan	13	(2)
2010	Győri ETO	3	(0)
2010–2011	Čelik Zenica	27	(9)
2011–2013	Željezničar	64	(40)
2013–2015	Samsunspor	39	(17)
2015	Şanlıurfaspor	18	(3)
2015–2016	Kayseri Erciyesspor	16	(4)
2017	Samsunspor	3	(0)
Total		258	(91)

International career
2007	Bosnia and Herzegovina U21	4	(4)
2007–2010	Bosnia and Herzegovina	2	(0)
- * Club domestic league appearances and goals

Eldin Adilović (born 8 February 1986) is a Bosnian retired professional footballer who played as a striker.

== International career ==
Adilović made his official debut for Bosnia and Herzegovina in a December 2010 friendly match against Poland, his second and final international appearance.

== Honours ==
=== Player ===
Željezničar

- Bosnian Premier League: 2011–12, 2012–13
- Bosnian Cup: 2011–12

Individual

- Bosnian Premier League top scorer: 2011–12
