= Stadion Pecara =

Multi-purpose stadium in Bosnia and Herzegovina

Pecara Stadium
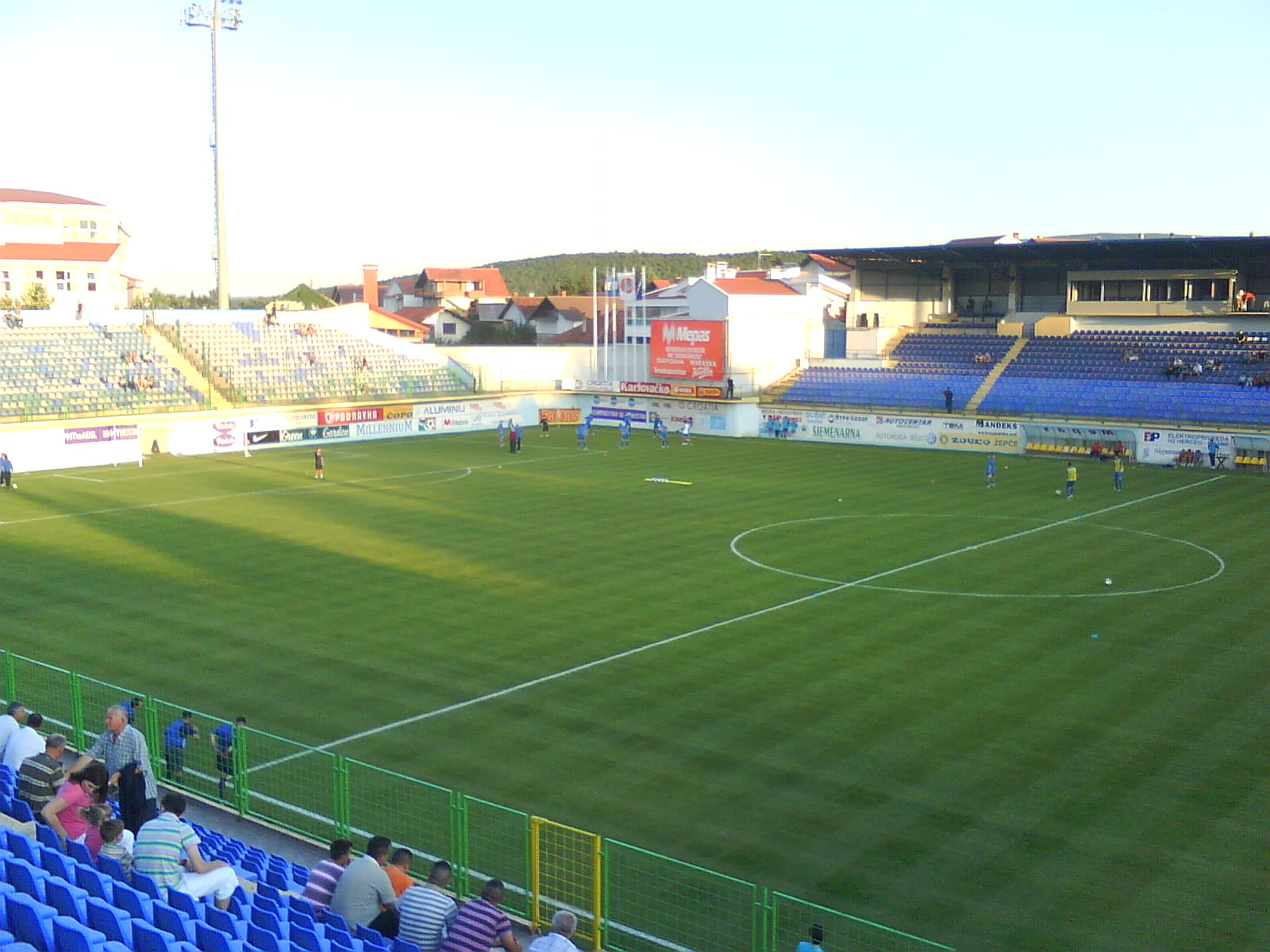
- Stadion Pecara - UEFA
- Interactive map of Pecara Stadium
- Location: Široki Brijeg, Bosnia and Herzegovina
- Coordinates: 43°22′43″N 17°35′53″E
- Owner: NK Široki Brijeg
- Operator: NK Široki Brijeg
- Capacity: 5,147
- Surface: Grass
- Scoreboard: LED
- Field size: 105 m × 68 m

Construction
- Opened: 1953
- Renovated: 1974, 1998–2001, 2016, 2023
- Expanded: 1998–2001, 2014–2015

Tenant
- NK Široki Brijeg

Pecara Stadium is a multi-purpose stadium in Široki Brijeg, Bosnia and Herzegovina. It is currently used mostly for football matches and is the home ground of NK Široki Brijeg, and is also used for the final match of football tournament Mjesne Zajednice. The stadium has a capacity of 5,147 spectators.
