= List of Bosnia and Herzegovina football transfers winter 2012–13 =

This is a list of transfers in Bosnian football for the 2012–13 winter transfer window. Only moves featuring a Premier League of Bosnia and Herzegovina, First League of the Republika Srpska and First League of the Federation of Bosnia and Herzegovina side are listed.

== Premier League of Bosnia and Herzegovina ==
=== Borac Banja Luka ===
In: Note: Flags indicate national team as defined under FIFA eligibility rules; some limited exceptions apply. Players may hold more than one non-FIFA nationality.

| No. | Pos. | Nation | Player |
|---|---|---|---|
| — | DF | SRB | Mladen Zeljković (from Radnik) |
| — | FW | BIH | Admir Raščić (from (Serbia) Novi Pazar) |
| — | FW | BIH | Nemanja Bilbija (on loan from (Serbia) Vojvodina) |
| — | MF | BIH | Darko Maletić (from (Kazakhstan) Aktobe) |
| — | MF | BIH | Vladan Grujić (from (Cyprus) AEP Paphos) |

Out: Note: Flags indicate national team as defined under FIFA eligibility rules; some limited exceptions apply. Players may hold more than one non-FIFA nationality.

| No. | Pos. | Nation | Player |
|---|---|---|---|
| 5 | DF | BIH | Alen Bašić (to Olimpic) |
| 19 | MF | BIH | Ognjen Radulović (to Rudar Prijedor) |
| 3 | DF | SRB | Nikola Vasiljević (released) |
| 9 | FW | SUI | Slaviša Dugić (released) |
| — | GK | BIH | Mladen Lučić (on loan to Radnik Bijeljina) |
| 23 | DF | BIH | Srđan Stojnić (to Rudar Prijedor) |
| 17 | FW | SRB | Petar Kunić (to (Czech Republic) Dukla) |

=== Čelik ===
In: Note: Flags indicate national team as defined under FIFA eligibility rules; some limited exceptions apply. Players may hold more than one non-FIFA nationality.

| No. | Pos. | Nation | Player |
|---|---|---|---|
| — | FW | BIH | Duško Stajić (from (Serbia) Sloboda Užice) |
| — | DF | MNE | Slobodan Lakićević (free, last with (Hungary) Pécsi) |
| — | DF | CRO | Darko Mišić (from Travnik) |
| — | GK | BIH | Adi Adilović (from (Greece) Panthrakikos Komotini) |

Out: Note: Flags indicate national team as defined under FIFA eligibility rules; some limited exceptions apply. Players may hold more than one non-FIFA nationality.

| No. | Pos. | Nation | Player |
|---|---|---|---|
| — | DF | BIH | Armin Mrguda (to (Croatia) Jadran Poreč) |
| — | MF | BIH | Bernad Imamović (to (Croatia) Jadran Poreč) |
| — | FW | BIH | Meksud Čolić (to (Germany) SV Göppingen) |
| — | FW | BIH | Esmir Sprečo (to Sloga Doboj) |

=== GOŠK ===
In: Note: Flags indicate national team as defined under FIFA eligibility rules; some limited exceptions apply. Players may hold more than one non-FIFA nationality.

| No. | Pos. | Nation | Player |
|---|---|---|---|
| — | DF | CRO | Josip Bonacin (from (Croatia) Jadran KS) |
| — | MF | BIH | Ajdin Maksumić (from (Serbia) Sloboda Užice) |
| — | MF | SRB | Jasmin Kolašinac (free, last with (Czech Republic) Graffin Vlašim) |

Out: Note: Flags indicate national team as defined under FIFA eligibility rules; some limited exceptions apply. Players may hold more than one non-FIFA nationality.

| No. | Pos. | Nation | Player |
|---|---|---|---|
| — | DF | CRO | Filip Žderić (on loan from (Lithuania) Siauliai) |

=== Gradina ===
In: Note: Flags indicate national team as defined under FIFA eligibility rules; some limited exceptions apply. Players may hold more than one non-FIFA nationality.

| No. | Pos. | Nation | Player |
|---|---|---|---|
| 88 | DF | BIH | Faris Zeljković (from Željezničar U19) |

Out: Note: Flags indicate national team as defined under FIFA eligibility rules; some limited exceptions apply. Players may hold more than one non-FIFA nationality.

| No. | Pos. | Nation | Player |
|---|---|---|---|
| 10 | FW | BIH | Adin Džafić (to (United States) San Antonio Scorpions) |
| 44 | MF | BIH | Amer Ordagić (to Zvijezda) |
| — | DF | CRO | Matija Katanec (released) |
| — | MF | BIH | Amer Jugo (released) |
| — | MF | BIH | Muamer Zolotić (released) |
| — | MF | BIH | Kristijan Ivešić (to Vitez) |
| — | FW | BIH | Ermin Huseinbašić (to Sarajevo) |
| — | FW | BIH | Damir Tosunović (released) |
| — | DF | BIH | Adnan Zukić (to (Czech Republic) Ústí nad Labem) |

=== Leotar ===
In: Note: Flags indicate national team as defined under FIFA eligibility rules; some limited exceptions apply. Players may hold more than one non-FIFA nationality.

| No. | Pos. | Nation | Player |
|---|---|---|---|
| — | GK | BIH | Miloš Đurković (from (Canada) Serbian White Eagles) |
| — | DF | SRB | Boris Milekić (from (Serbia) Donji Srem) |
| — | DF | SRB | Boro Nikolić (from (Serbia) Sloboda Užice) |
| — | MF | SRB | Stevan Luković (on loan from (Serbia) Red Star Belgrade) |
| — | FW | SRB | Saša Bogunović (from (Serbia) Novi Sad) |

Out: Note: Flags indicate national team as defined under FIFA eligibility rules; some limited exceptions apply. Players may hold more than one non-FIFA nationality.

| No. | Pos. | Nation | Player |
|---|---|---|---|
| 1 | GK | SRB | Boško Milenković (released) |
| 7 | DF | BIH | Vladimir Todorović (released) |
| 8 | MF | SRB | Jovan Radivojevoć (released) |
| 10 | MF | SRB | Njegoš Goločevac (to (Serbia) Kolubara) |
| 13 | MF | SRB | Pavle Sušić (to Zvijezda) |
| 14 | DF | BIH | Aleksandar Vasiljević (to (Serbia) Novi Pazar) |
| — | DF | SRB | Dejan Ponjević (released) |
| — | DF | BIH | Mirko Koprivica (released) |
| — | MF | BIH | Ljubiša Pecelj (released) |

=== Olimpic ===
In: Note: Flags indicate national team as defined under FIFA eligibility rules; some limited exceptions apply. Players may hold more than one non-FIFA nationality.

| No. | Pos. | Nation | Player |
|---|---|---|---|
| — | DF | BIH | Alen Bašić (from Borac) |
| — | DF | BIH | Haris Hodžić (from (England) Watford) |
| — | MF | BIH | Muamer Vila (from Čapljina) |
| — | MF | BIH | Ervin Jusufović (from Sloboda Tuzla) |
| — | FW | BIH | Mirza Bašić (from (Czech Republic) Příbram) |
| — | MF | BIH | Marko Mišić (from Vitez) |
| — | MF | CRO | Vilim Posinković (free, last with (Greece) Kavala) |
| — | DF | BIH | Alem Merajić (from Olimpic U19) |
| — | DF | BIH | Vernes Islamagić (from Olimpic U19) |
| — | MF | BIH | Dejan Limić (free) |

Out: Note: Flags indicate national team as defined under FIFA eligibility rules; some limited exceptions apply. Players may hold more than one non-FIFA nationality.

| No. | Pos. | Nation | Player |
|---|---|---|---|
| 3 | MF | BIH | Haris Hajradinović (to (Croatia) Inter Zaprešić) |
| 7 | MF | SRB | Miloš Đorđević (released) |
| 11 | FW | BIH | Rijad Pljevljak (to (Czech Republic) Roudnice nad Labem) |
| 14 | MF | BIH | Faruk Brković (released) |
| 16 | FW | BIH | Alen Škoro (released) |
| 18 | MF | BIH | Amir Zolj (to Velež) |
| 23 | FW | BIH | Almir Pliska (to Velež) |
| — | DF | BIH | Eldin Dučić (to (Hungary) Szigetszentmiklósi) |
| — | MF | BIH | Fenan Salčinović (released) |

=== Radnik ===
In: Note: Flags indicate national team as defined under FIFA eligibility rules; some limited exceptions apply. Players may hold more than one non-FIFA nationality.

| No. | Pos. | Nation | Player |
|---|---|---|---|
| — | GK | BIH | Mladen Lučić (on loan from Borac Banja Luka) |
| — | DF | SRB | Miloš Petrušić (from (Serbia) Srem) |
| — | MF | BIH | Dejan Rajak (from (Italy) -) |
| — | FW | BIH | Filip Vujić (from (Serbia) Jedinstvo Putevi) |
| — | FW | SRB | Marko Obradović (from (Belgium) Eupen) |

Out: Note: Flags indicate national team as defined under FIFA eligibility rules; some limited exceptions apply. Players may hold more than one non-FIFA nationality.

| No. | Pos. | Nation | Player |
|---|---|---|---|
| 2 | MF | SRB | Mladen Zeljković (to Borac Banja Luka) |
| 3 | MF | SRB | Stanko Ostojić (released) |
| 14 | FW | BIH | Miroslav Rikanović (released) |
| — | DF | SRB | Stevan Jovanović (released) |

=== Rudar Prijedor ===
In: Note: Flags indicate national team as defined under FIFA eligibility rules; some limited exceptions apply. Players may hold more than one non-FIFA nationality.

| No. | Pos. | Nation | Player |
|---|---|---|---|
| — | MF | BIH | Ognjen Radulović (from Borac Banja Luka) |
| — | MF | CRO | Mato Ivanović (from (Czech Republic) Slavia Prague) |
| — | MF | BIH | Nebojša Pejić (free) |
| — | FW | BIH | Igor Burazor (from Borac Kozarska Dubica) |
| — | DF | BIH | Srđan Stojnić (from Borac Banja Luka) |
| — | MF | SRB | Igor Mišan (from (Serbia) Novi Sad) |

Out: Note: Flags indicate national team as defined under FIFA eligibility rules; some limited exceptions apply. Players may hold more than one non-FIFA nationality.

| No. | Pos. | Nation | Player |
|---|---|---|---|
| 1 | GK | BIH | Bojan Tripić (released) |
| 7 | DF | BIH | Nebojša Šodić (released) |
| 11 | FW | SRB | Damir Rovčanin (released) |
| 16 | MF | BIH | Goran Kecman (released) |
| 31 | GK | MNE | Aleksandar Nikolić (to Leotar) |
| — | DF | BIH | Borislav Topić (released) |
| — | MF | BIH | Duško Sakan (loan return to (Serbia) Rad Beograd) |
| — | FW | BIH | Vladimir Karalić (to (Hong Kong) Sun Pegasus) |
| — | FW | GEO | Apollon Lemondzhava (released) |

=== Sarajevo ===
In: Note: Flags indicate national team as defined under FIFA eligibility rules; some limited exceptions apply. Players may hold more than one non-FIFA nationality.

| No. | Pos. | Nation | Player |
|---|---|---|---|
| 22 | MF | BIH | Amer Osmanagić (from (Norway) Haugesund) |
| 7 | FW | BIH | Ermin Huseinbašić (from Gradina) |
| 13 | MF | BIH | Ognjen Todorović (free) |
| 89 | MF | BIH | Muhamed Džakmić (from (South Korea) Gangwon) |
| — | MF | BIH | Vlado Zadro (free, last with (Croatia) Zagreb) |
| 88 | MF | BIH | Samir Radovac (from Sarajevo U19) |
| 9 | FW | BIH | Alen Melunović (from (Czech Republic) Teplice) |
| 5 | MF | BIH | Adnan Hrelja (from (Hungary) Pecsi) |

Out: Note: Flags indicate national team as defined under FIFA eligibility rules; some limited exceptions apply. Players may hold more than one non-FIFA nationality.

| No. | Pos. | Nation | Player |
|---|---|---|---|
| 17 | MF | BIH | Boris Gujić (released) |
| 21 | FW | SRB | Žarko Karamatić (released) |
| 25 | FW | SEN | Secouba Diatta (to Zvijezda) |
| 11 | FW | BIH | Sulejman Krpić (released) |
| 20 | FW | SLO | Samir Nuhanović (to (Austria) Steinfeld) |
| 7 | MF | BIH | Said Husejinović (to (Croatia) Dinamo Zagreb) |
| 5 | MF | BIH | Ivan Sesar (to (Turkey) Elazığspor) |
| 23 | DF | SRB | Zoran Belošević (to (Greece) Pierikos) |
| 18 | FW | SRB | Edin Ademović (released) |
| 88 | FW | BIH | Adin Čiva |

=== Široki Brijeg ===
In: Note: Flags indicate national team as defined under FIFA eligibility rules; some limited exceptions apply. Players may hold more than one non-FIFA nationality.

| No. | Pos. | Nation | Player |
|---|---|---|---|
| — | FW | BRA | Evando Fonseca (free) |

Out: Note: Flags indicate national team as defined under FIFA eligibility rules; some limited exceptions apply. Players may hold more than one non-FIFA nationality.

| No. | Pos. | Nation | Player |
|---|---|---|---|
| 22 | MF | SLO | Sandro Bloudek (released) |
| 9 | FW | BRA | Ricardo Baiano (released) |

=== Slavija ===
In: Note: Flags indicate national team as defined under FIFA eligibility rules; some limited exceptions apply. Players may hold more than one non-FIFA nationality.

| No. | Pos. | Nation | Player |
|---|---|---|---|
| — | FW | BIH | Igor Radovanović (free) |
| — | MF | SRB | Srđan Urošević (free, last with (Serbia) Smederevo) |
| — | MF | SRB | Miloš Đorđević (free, last with Olimpic) |

Out: Note: Flags indicate national team as defined under FIFA eligibility rules; some limited exceptions apply. Players may hold more than one non-FIFA nationality.

| No. | Pos. | Nation | Player |
|---|---|---|---|
| 24 | MF | BIH | Haris Bešlija (end of career) |
| 4 | MF | BIH | Haris Fazlagić (released) |

=== Travnik ===
In: Note: Flags indicate national team as defined under FIFA eligibility rules; some limited exceptions apply. Players may hold more than one non-FIFA nationality.

| No. | Pos. | Nation | Player |
|---|---|---|---|
| — | MF | BIH | Anel Čurić (free, last with Velež) |
| — | FW | BIH | Nedo Turković (from (Montenegro) Lovćen) |

Out: Note: Flags indicate national team as defined under FIFA eligibility rules; some limited exceptions apply. Players may hold more than one non-FIFA nationality.

| No. | Pos. | Nation | Player |
|---|---|---|---|
| 42 | MF | BIH | Haris Redžepi (to (Serbia) Novi Pazar) |
| 46 | FW | BIH | Adnan Smajić (released) |
| — | MF | BIH | Mahir Karić (released) |
| 33 | MF | CRO | Juro Pejić (to Vitez) |
| — | DF | CRO | Darko Mišić (to Čelik) |

=== Velež ===
In: Note: Flags indicate national team as defined under FIFA eligibility rules; some limited exceptions apply. Players may hold more than one non-FIFA nationality.

| No. | Pos. | Nation | Player |
|---|---|---|---|
| — | GK | BIH | Senadin Oštraković (from (Kazakhstan) Taraz) |
| — | MF | BIH | Amir Zolj (from Olimpic) |
| — | DF | BIH | Matijas Pejić (from Sloboda Tuzla) |
| — | FW | BIH | Almir Pliska (from Olimpic) |
| — | MF | BIH | Admir Vladavić (from (Czech Republic) Karviná) |
| — | MF | BIH | Bojan Letić (from Borac Šamac) |

Out: Note: Flags indicate national team as defined under FIFA eligibility rules; some limited exceptions apply. Players may hold more than one non-FIFA nationality.

| No. | Pos. | Nation | Player |
|---|---|---|---|
| 10 | FW | BIH | Rijad Demić (to (Iran) Aluminium Hormozgan) |
| 15 | DF | BIH | Armin Jazvin (released) |
| 18 | MF | BIH | Anel Čurić (released) |
| 19 | MF | BIH | Maid Jaganjac (released) |
| 25 | DF | SRB | Milan Knežević (released) |
| — | GK | SRB | Željko Kuzmić (released) |
| — | MF | BIH | Adi Mehremić (released) |
| — | GK | BIH | Armin Suta (released) |

=== Željezničar ===
In: Note: Flags indicate national team as defined under FIFA eligibility rules; some limited exceptions apply. Players may hold more than one non-FIFA nationality.

| No. | Pos. | Nation | Player |
|---|---|---|---|
| — | MF | BIH | Damir Sadiković (from Željezničar U19) |

Out: Note: Flags indicate national team as defined under FIFA eligibility rules; some limited exceptions apply. Players may hold more than one non-FIFA nationality.

| No. | Pos. | Nation | Player |
|---|---|---|---|
| 21 | MF | BIH | Mirsad Bešlija (end of career) |
| 10 | MF | BIH | Zajko Zeba (to (Croatia) Split) |

=== Zrinjski ===
In: Note: Flags indicate national team as defined under FIFA eligibility rules; some limited exceptions apply. Players may hold more than one non-FIFA nationality.

| No. | Pos. | Nation | Player |
|---|---|---|---|
| — | FW | CRO | Matija Poredski (from (Croatia) Solin) |
| — | MF | CRO | Ivan Crnov (from (Croatia) Gorica) |
| — | DF | MKD | Gligor Gligorov (free) |
| — | MF | CRO | Hrvoje Barišić (from (Croatia) Dugopolje) |
| — | FW | BIH | Marin Jurina (from (Croatia) Hajduk Split) |

Out: Note: Flags indicate national team as defined under FIFA eligibility rules; some limited exceptions apply. Players may hold more than one non-FIFA nationality.

| No. | Pos. | Nation | Player |
|---|---|---|---|
| 14 | MF | CRO | Dario Krišto (released) |
| 19 | FW | BIH | Ivan Ferenc (released) |
| 21 | FW | CRO | Ivan Bubalo (released) |
| 24 | DF | BIH | Robert Grbovac (released) |
| 25 | MF | CRO | Mario Vrdoljak (released) |
| 9 | FW | BIH | Amer Bekić (to (Switzerland) Winterthur) |
| 5 | DF | BIH | Toni Markić (released) |
| 10 | MF | SRB | Igor Aničić (released) |

=== Zvijezda Gradačac ===
In: Note: Flags indicate national team as defined under FIFA eligibility rules; some limited exceptions apply. Players may hold more than one non-FIFA nationality.

| No. | Pos. | Nation | Player |
|---|---|---|---|
| — | MF | BIH | Amer Ordagić (from Gradina) |
| — | GK | BIH | Ivan Mandušić (from Sloboda Tuzla) |
| — | MF | SRB | Pavle Sušić (from Leotar) |
| — | MF | MKD | Perica Stančeski (from (Serbia) BSK Borča) |
| — | DF | BIH | Saša Mus (from (China) Beijing Baxy) |
| — | DF | BIH | Nebojša Šodić (free, last with Rudar Prijedor) |
| — | FW | MKD | Fahrudin Đurđević (from (Serbia) Spartak ZV) |
| — | FW | BIH | Ahmed Džafić (from (Germany) SV Sandhausen) |
| — | FW | SEN | Secouba Diatta (from Sarajevo) |
| — | MF | BRA | Adam (free) |

Out: Note: Flags indicate national team as defined under FIFA eligibility rules; some limited exceptions apply. Players may hold more than one non-FIFA nationality.

| No. | Pos. | Nation | Player |
|---|---|---|---|
| 4 | FW | BIH | Mehmed Bijelić (on loan to Bosna Mionica) |
| 7 | FW | BIH | Dejan Kojić (released) |
| 17 | FW | BIH | Ermin Vehabović (released) |
| 24 | FW | BIH | Zvezdan Stanić (released) |
| 20 | MF | BIH | Edin Husić (to (United States) San Antonio Scorpions) |
| 12 | GK | BIH | Raif Smajlić (released) |
| 15 | DF | BIH | Rusmir Jusić (released) |
| 26 | MF | BIH | Eldin Mašić (released) |
| — | GK | SRB | Nikola Mirković (loan return to (Serbia) Spartak ZV) |
| — | DF | SRB | Vojislav Stojanac (released) |

== First League of the Republika Srpska ==
=== Borac Šamac ===
In: Note: Flags indicate national team as defined under FIFA eligibility rules; some limited exceptions apply. Players may hold more than one non-FIFA nationality.

| No. | Pos. | Nation | Player |
|---|---|---|---|
| — | GK | BIH | Raif Smajlić (free, last with Zvijezda Gradačac) |

Out: Note: Flags indicate national team as defined under FIFA eligibility rules; some limited exceptions apply. Players may hold more than one non-FIFA nationality.

| No. | Pos. | Nation | Player |
|---|---|---|---|
| — | MF | BIH | Bojan Letić (to Velež) |

=== Drina HE ===
In: Note: Flags indicate national team as defined under FIFA eligibility rules; some limited exceptions apply. Players may hold more than one non-FIFA nationality.

| No. | Pos. | Nation | Player |

Out: Note: Flags indicate national team as defined under FIFA eligibility rules; some limited exceptions apply. Players may hold more than one non-FIFA nationality.

| No. | Pos. | Nation | Player |

=== Drina Zvornik ===
In: Note: Flags indicate national team as defined under FIFA eligibility rules; some limited exceptions apply. Players may hold more than one non-FIFA nationality.

| No. | Pos. | Nation | Player |

Out: Note: Flags indicate national team as defined under FIFA eligibility rules; some limited exceptions apply. Players may hold more than one non-FIFA nationality.

| No. | Pos. | Nation | Player |
|---|---|---|---|
| 24 | FW | BIH | Aleksandar Nikolić (to Željezničar) |

=== Kozara ===
In: Note: Flags indicate national team as defined under FIFA eligibility rules; some limited exceptions apply. Players may hold more than one non-FIFA nationality.

| No. | Pos. | Nation | Player |

Out: Note: Flags indicate national team as defined under FIFA eligibility rules; some limited exceptions apply. Players may hold more than one non-FIFA nationality.

| No. | Pos. | Nation | Player |
|---|---|---|---|
| 3 | DF | BIH | Ognjen Petrović (to (Serbia) Javor) |
| 8 | DF | BIH | Miljan Bajić (end of career) |
| 22 | FW | BIH | Ognjen Škorić (to (Serbia) Donji Srem) |

=== Ljubić ===
In: Note: Flags indicate national team as defined under FIFA eligibility rules; some limited exceptions apply. Players may hold more than one non-FIFA nationality.

| No. | Pos. | Nation | Player |
|---|---|---|---|
| — | MF | BIH | Stefan Kladar (from Sloboda Novi Grad) |

Out: Note: Flags indicate national team as defined under FIFA eligibility rules; some limited exceptions apply. Players may hold more than one non-FIFA nationality.

| No. | Pos. | Nation | Player |

=== Mladost Velika Obarska ===
In: Note: Flags indicate national team as defined under FIFA eligibility rules; some limited exceptions apply. Players may hold more than one non-FIFA nationality.

| No. | Pos. | Nation | Player |
|---|---|---|---|
| — | DF | BIH | Vladimir Todorović (free, last with Leotar) |
| — | FW | SRB | Nenad Đurić (from (Serbia) Radnički Stobex) |
| — | GK | BIH | Bojan Tripić (free, last with Rudar Prijedor) |

Out: Note: Flags indicate national team as defined under FIFA eligibility rules; some limited exceptions apply. Players may hold more than one non-FIFA nationality.

| No. | Pos. | Nation | Player |
|---|---|---|---|
| 1 | GK | BIH | Branislav Ružić (released) |
| 13 | FW | BIH | Neđo Šuka (released) |
| — | DF | SRB | Miodrag Vasiljević (released) |
| — | MF | BIH | Dejan Pavlović (released) |
| — | MF | BIH | Dejan Drakul (released) |

=== Mladost Gacko ===
In: Note: Flags indicate national team as defined under FIFA eligibility rules; some limited exceptions apply. Players may hold more than one non-FIFA nationality.

| No. | Pos. | Nation | Player |

Out: Note: Flags indicate national team as defined under FIFA eligibility rules; some limited exceptions apply. Players may hold more than one non-FIFA nationality.

| No. | Pos. | Nation | Player |

=== Modriča ===
In: Note: Flags indicate national team as defined under FIFA eligibility rules; some limited exceptions apply. Players may hold more than one non-FIFA nationality.

| No. | Pos. | Nation | Player |
|---|---|---|---|
| — | GK | BIH | Dejan Topić (from Modriča U19) |
| — | MF | BIH | Ratko Buljić (from Modriča U19) |
| — | MF | BIH | Ljubiša Sarkić (from Modriča U19) |
| — | FW | BIH | Goran Tokić (from Modriča U19) |
| — | FW | BIH | Siniša Sarkić (from Modriča U19) |
| — | FW | BIH | Dejan Dugić (from Modriča U19) |
| — | MF | BIH | Darko Rogić (from Laktaši) |
| — | DF | MKD | Darko Alekovski (from (North Macedonia) Babi Štip) |

Out: Note: Flags indicate national team as defined under FIFA eligibility rules; some limited exceptions apply. Players may hold more than one non-FIFA nationality.

| No. | Pos. | Nation | Player |
|---|---|---|---|
| 1 | GK | BIH | Stefan Milkanović (to (Belgium) -) |
| 12 | GK | BIH | Dušan Milojević (to (Germany) -) |
| 15 | DF | BIH | Miroslav Vidaković (to (Germany) -) |
| — | MF | SRB | Predrag Latković (to (Hungary) -) |
| — | FW | BIH | Mićo Kuzmanović (to (Croatia) Dinamo Zagreb) |
| — | FW | BIH | Spasoje Savkić (released) |
| 23 | DF | BIH | Miroslav Cvijić (released) |

=== Podrinje ===
In: Note: Flags indicate national team as defined under FIFA eligibility rules; some limited exceptions apply. Players may hold more than one non-FIFA nationality.

| No. | Pos. | Nation | Player |
|---|---|---|---|
| — | MF | BIH | Adel Mujić (from Guber Srebrenica) |

Out: Note: Flags indicate national team as defined under FIFA eligibility rules; some limited exceptions apply. Players may hold more than one non-FIFA nationality.

| No. | Pos. | Nation | Player |
|---|---|---|---|
| — | DF | BIH | Danijel Dražić (released) |
| — | MF | BIH | Mladen Milanović (released) |
| — | MF | BIH | Slaviša Jokić (released) |

=== Rudar Ugljevik ===
In: Note: Flags indicate national team as defined under FIFA eligibility rules; some limited exceptions apply. Players may hold more than one non-FIFA nationality.

| No. | Pos. | Nation | Player |

Out: Note: Flags indicate national team as defined under FIFA eligibility rules; some limited exceptions apply. Players may hold more than one non-FIFA nationality.

| No. | Pos. | Nation | Player |
|---|---|---|---|
| — | DF | BIH | Slobodan Jovanović (to Jedinstvo Brodac) |
| — | MF | BIH | Duško Bećarević (released) |
| — | DF | BIH | Blagojević (released) |
| — | MF | BIH | Tošić (released) |
| — | MF | BIH | Dragan Simikić (released) |

=== Sloboda Mrkonjić Grad ===
In: Note: Flags indicate national team as defined under FIFA eligibility rules; some limited exceptions apply. Players may hold more than one non-FIFA nationality.

| No. | Pos. | Nation | Player |
|---|---|---|---|
| — | MF | BIH | Duško Sakan (from (Serbia) Rad) |

Out: Note: Flags indicate national team as defined under FIFA eligibility rules; some limited exceptions apply. Players may hold more than one non-FIFA nationality.

| No. | Pos. | Nation | Player |
|---|---|---|---|
| 12 | GK | BIH | Nikola Đurić (to (Czech Republic) Dynamo České Budějovice) |
| 8 | MF | BIH | Bojan Tadić (to Sutjeska Foča) |
| 9 | FW | BIH | Saša Stijepić (to (Sweden) -) |

=== Sloboda Novi Grad ===
In: Note: Flags indicate national team as defined under FIFA eligibility rules; some limited exceptions apply. Players may hold more than one non-FIFA nationality.

| No. | Pos. | Nation | Player |
|---|---|---|---|
| — | DF | BIH | Aleksa Živković (from Slobobda Novi Grad U19) |
| — | DF | BIH | Damjan Đurđić (from Sloboda Novi Grad U19) |
| — | DF | BIH | Nemanja Vujatović (from Plamen Donje Vodičevo) |
| — | MF | BIH | Ranko Dekić (from Rudar Prijedor U19) |
| — | MF | BIH | Igor Radmanović (from Sloboda Novi Grad U19) |
| — | FW | BIH | Vladimir Sovilja (from Sloboda Novi Grad U19) |
| — | FW | BIH | Duško Miljković (from Partizan Kostajnica) |
| — | MF | BIH | Edvin Hamzić (free) |

Out: Note: Flags indicate national team as defined under FIFA eligibility rules; some limited exceptions apply. Players may hold more than one non-FIFA nationality.

| No. | Pos. | Nation | Player |
|---|---|---|---|
| — | DF | BIH | Dejan Sundać (end of career) |
| — | MF | BIH | Arnes Brkić (to (Austria) -) |
| — | MF | BIH | Stefan Kladar (to Ljubić) |
| — | MF | BIH | Mirko Tica (to Sutjeska Foča) |
| — | MF | BIH | Stevo Kovačević (end of career) |
| — | MF | BIH | Aleksandar Vrebac (to BSK) |
| — | FW | BIH | Nikola Zec (to BSK) |
| — | MF | BIH | Ranko Dekić (released) |

=== Sloga Doboj ===
In: Note: Flags indicate national team as defined under FIFA eligibility rules; some limited exceptions apply. Players may hold more than one non-FIFA nationality.

| No. | Pos. | Nation | Player |
|---|---|---|---|
| — | FW | BIH | Ermin Vehabović (free, last with Zvijezda Gradačac) |
| — | FW | BIH | Esmir Sprečo (from Čelik Zenica) |

Out: Note: Flags indicate national team as defined under FIFA eligibility rules; some limited exceptions apply. Players may hold more than one non-FIFA nationality.

| No. | Pos. | Nation | Player |

=== Sutjeska Foča ===
In: Note: Flags indicate national team as defined under FIFA eligibility rules; some limited exceptions apply. Players may hold more than one non-FIFA nationality.

| No. | Pos. | Nation | Player |
|---|---|---|---|
| — | FW | BIH | Neđo Šuka (free, last with Mladost Velika Obarska) |
| — | MF | BIH | Mirko Tica (from Sloboda Novi Grad) |
| — | MF | BIH | Bojan Tadić (from Sloboda Mrkonjić Grad) |
| — | MF | BIH | Dejan Drakul (free, last with Mladost Velika Obarska) |

Out: Note: Flags indicate national team as defined under FIFA eligibility rules; some limited exceptions apply. Players may hold more than one non-FIFA nationality.

| No. | Pos. | Nation | Player |
|---|---|---|---|
| — | DF | BIH | Dejan Tasić (released) |
| — | MF | BIH | Novo Papaz (released) |

== First League of the Federation of Bosnia and Herzegovina ==
=== Bosna ===
In: Note: Flags indicate national team as defined under FIFA eligibility rules; some limited exceptions apply. Players may hold more than one non-FIFA nationality.

| No. | Pos. | Nation | Player |

Out: Note: Flags indicate national team as defined under FIFA eligibility rules; some limited exceptions apply. Players may hold more than one non-FIFA nationality.

| No. | Pos. | Nation | Player |

=== Branitelj ===
In: Note: Flags indicate national team as defined under FIFA eligibility rules; some limited exceptions apply. Players may hold more than one non-FIFA nationality.

| No. | Pos. | Nation | Player |

Out: Note: Flags indicate national team as defined under FIFA eligibility rules; some limited exceptions apply. Players may hold more than one non-FIFA nationality.

| No. | Pos. | Nation | Player |
|---|---|---|---|
| — | DF | BIH | Vlado Hrkač (to (Croatia) Neretvanac) |

=== Bratstvo ===
In: Note: Flags indicate national team as defined under FIFA eligibility rules; some limited exceptions apply. Players may hold more than one non-FIFA nationality.

| No. | Pos. | Nation | Player |
|---|---|---|---|
| — | FW | BIH | Armin Sinanović (on loan from Krajina Cazin) |

Out: Note: Flags indicate national team as defined under FIFA eligibility rules; some limited exceptions apply. Players may hold more than one non-FIFA nationality.

| No. | Pos. | Nation | Player |
|---|---|---|---|
| — | MF | BIH | Kerim Kadrić (released) |
| — | DF | BIH | Nenad Timkov (released) |
| — | FW | BIH | Armin Mahović (released) |
| — | GK | BIH | Ebis Šabić (released) |
| — | MF | BIH | Slaviša Đukanović (released) |

=== Budućnost ===
In: Note: Flags indicate national team as defined under FIFA eligibility rules; some limited exceptions apply. Players may hold more than one non-FIFA nationality.

| No. | Pos. | Nation | Player |
|---|---|---|---|
| — | DF | BIH | Elvis Čolić (free) |
| — | GK | BIH | Denis Mujkić (from (Serbia) Novi Pazar) |

Out: Note: Flags indicate national team as defined under FIFA eligibility rules; some limited exceptions apply. Players may hold more than one non-FIFA nationality.

| No. | Pos. | Nation | Player |

=== Čapljina ===
In: Note: Flags indicate national team as defined under FIFA eligibility rules; some limited exceptions apply. Players may hold more than one non-FIFA nationality.

| No. | Pos. | Nation | Player |

Out: Note: Flags indicate national team as defined under FIFA eligibility rules; some limited exceptions apply. Players may hold more than one non-FIFA nationality.

| No. | Pos. | Nation | Player |
|---|---|---|---|
| — | MF | BIH | Muamer Vila (to Olimpic) |

=== Goražde ===
In: Note: Flags indicate national team as defined under FIFA eligibility rules; some limited exceptions apply. Players may hold more than one non-FIFA nationality.

| No. | Pos. | Nation | Player |

Out: Note: Flags indicate national team as defined under FIFA eligibility rules; some limited exceptions apply. Players may hold more than one non-FIFA nationality.

| No. | Pos. | Nation | Player |

=== Iskra ===
In: Note: Flags indicate national team as defined under FIFA eligibility rules; some limited exceptions apply. Players may hold more than one non-FIFA nationality.

| No. | Pos. | Nation | Player |

Out: Note: Flags indicate national team as defined under FIFA eligibility rules; some limited exceptions apply. Players may hold more than one non-FIFA nationality.

| No. | Pos. | Nation | Player |

=== Jedinstvo ===
In: Note: Flags indicate national team as defined under FIFA eligibility rules; some limited exceptions apply. Players may hold more than one non-FIFA nationality.

| No. | Pos. | Nation | Player |
|---|---|---|---|
| — | MF | BIH | Armin Karabegović (from Jedinstvo U19) |
| — | MF | BIH | Benjamin Kapetanović (from Jedinstvo U19) |
| — | MF | BIH | Edis Ćetić (from Jedinstvo U19) |
| — | MF | BIH | Aldin Prošić (from Jedinstvo U19) |
| — | DF | BIH | Ekrem Hodžić (from (Azerbaijan) Ravan Baku) |
| — | MF | BIH | Dino Toromanović (from Krajina Cazin) |
| — | DF | BIH | Damir Šahinović (from Krajina Cazin) |
| — | DF | BIH | Renail Hušić (from Krajina Cazin) |
| — | DF | BIH | Damir Šahinović (from Krajina Cazin) |
| — | DF | BIH | Elvir Šušnjar (from Krajina Cazin) |
| — | FW | BIH | Halid Delić (from Krajina Cazin) |

Out: Note: Flags indicate national team as defined under FIFA eligibility rules; some limited exceptions apply. Players may hold more than one non-FIFA nationality.

| No. | Pos. | Nation | Player |
|---|---|---|---|
| 14 | MF | BIH | Endi Nuhanović (to (Greece) Kalamata) |
| 19 | FW | BIH | Miloš Galin (to (Greece) Kalamata) |

=== Krajina ===
In: Note: Flags indicate national team as defined under FIFA eligibility rules; some limited exceptions apply. Players may hold more than one non-FIFA nationality.

| No. | Pos. | Nation | Player |

Out: Note: Flags indicate national team as defined under FIFA eligibility rules; some limited exceptions apply. Players may hold more than one non-FIFA nationality.

| No. | Pos. | Nation | Player |
|---|---|---|---|
| — | MF | BIH | Dino Toromanović (to Jedinstvo Bihać) |
| — | DF | BIH | Damir Šahinović (to Jedinstvo Bihać) |
| — | DF | BIH | Renail Hušić (to Jedinstvo Bihać) |
| — | DF | BIH | Damir Šahinović (to Jedinstvo Bihać) |
| — | DF | BIH | Elvir Šušnjar (to Jedinstvo Bihać) |
| — | FW | BIH | Halid Delić (to Jedinstvo Bihać) |
| — | MF | BIH | Sanid Halilović (released) |
| — | MF | BIH | Adis Stambolija (released) |
| — | FW | BIH | Armin Sinanović (on loan to Bratstvo) |
| — | DF | BIH | Boris Muzgonja (to Podgrmeč) |

=== Krajišnik ===
In: Note: Flags indicate national team as defined under FIFA eligibility rules; some limited exceptions apply. Players may hold more than one non-FIFA nationality.

| No. | Pos. | Nation | Player |

Out: Note: Flags indicate national team as defined under FIFA eligibility rules; some limited exceptions apply. Players may hold more than one non-FIFA nationality.

| No. | Pos. | Nation | Player |

=== Podgrmeč ===
In: Note: Flags indicate national team as defined under FIFA eligibility rules; some limited exceptions apply. Players may hold more than one non-FIFA nationality.

| No. | Pos. | Nation | Player |

Out: Note: Flags indicate national team as defined under FIFA eligibility rules; some limited exceptions apply. Players may hold more than one non-FIFA nationality.

| No. | Pos. | Nation | Player |

=== Radnički ===
In: Note: Flags indicate national team as defined under FIFA eligibility rules; some limited exceptions apply. Players may hold more than one non-FIFA nationality.

| No. | Pos. | Nation | Player |

Out: Note: Flags indicate national team as defined under FIFA eligibility rules; some limited exceptions apply. Players may hold more than one non-FIFA nationality.

| No. | Pos. | Nation | Player |

=== Rudar ===
In: Note: Flags indicate national team as defined under FIFA eligibility rules; some limited exceptions apply. Players may hold more than one non-FIFA nationality.

| No. | Pos. | Nation | Player |

Out: Note: Flags indicate national team as defined under FIFA eligibility rules; some limited exceptions apply. Players may hold more than one non-FIFA nationality.

| No. | Pos. | Nation | Player |
|---|---|---|---|
| 8 | MF | BIH | Josip Tomić (to (Germany) BSV Rehden) |

=== Sloboda ===
In: Note: Flags indicate national team as defined under FIFA eligibility rules; some limited exceptions apply. Players may hold more than one non-FIFA nationality.

| No. | Pos. | Nation | Player |
|---|---|---|---|
| — | DF | BIH | Nermin Gosto (free) |

Out: Note: Flags indicate national team as defined under FIFA eligibility rules; some limited exceptions apply. Players may hold more than one non-FIFA nationality.

| No. | Pos. | Nation | Player |
|---|---|---|---|
| 19 | DF | BIH | Matijas Pejić (to Velež) |
| — | GK | BIH | Ivan Mandušić (to Zvijezda) |
| 8 | MF | BIH | Adnan Jahić (released) |
| — | DF | BIH | Mueamer Nezić (released) |
| 88 | MF | BIH | Ervin Jusufović (to Olimpic) |

=== Troglav ===
In: Note: Flags indicate national team as defined under FIFA eligibility rules; some limited exceptions apply. Players may hold more than one non-FIFA nationality.

| No. | Pos. | Nation | Player |

Out: Note: Flags indicate national team as defined under FIFA eligibility rules; some limited exceptions apply. Players may hold more than one non-FIFA nationality.

| No. | Pos. | Nation | Player |
|---|---|---|---|
| — | DF | BIH | Stipe Miloš (to (Hungary) SzTK) |

=== Vitez ===
In: Note: Flags indicate national team as defined under FIFA eligibility rules; some limited exceptions apply. Players may hold more than one non-FIFA nationality.

| No. | Pos. | Nation | Player |
|---|---|---|---|
| — | DF | CRO | Juro Pejić (from Travnik) |
| — | MF | BIH | Kristijan Ivešić (from Gradina) |

Out: Note: Flags indicate national team as defined under FIFA eligibility rules; some limited exceptions apply. Players may hold more than one non-FIFA nationality.

| No. | Pos. | Nation | Player |
|---|---|---|---|
| — | DF | BIH | Marko Mišić (to Olimpic) |

== See also ==
- Premier League of Bosnia and Herzegovina
- First League of the Republika Srpska
- First League of the Federation of Bosnia and Herzegovina
- 2012–13 Premier League of Bosnia and Herzegovina
- 2012–13 First League of the Republika Srpska
- 2012–13 First League of the Federation of Bosnia and Herzegovina
