= 2012–13 Premier League of Bosnia and Herzegovina =

Premijer liga
- Season: 2012–13
- Champions: Željezničar; 5th Premier League title 6th Bosnian title 7th Domestic title
- Relegated: GOŠK; Gradina
- Champions League: Željezničar
- Europa League: Široki Brijeg; Sarajevo; Zrinjski
- Matches: 240
- Goals: 560 (2.33 per match)
- Top goalscorer: Emir Hadžić (20 goals)
- Biggest home win: Velež 6–0 Travnik
- Biggest away win: Zvijezda 1–4 Željezničar; Leotar 0–3 Sarajevo; Zrinjski 1–4 Olimpic; Velež 0–3 Slavija; Radnik 0–3 Željezničar; Zrinjski 0–3 GOŠK
- Highest scoring: 6 goals Zvijezda 5–1 Gradina; Leotar 4–2 GOŠK; Velež 6–0 Travnik; Borac 5–1 Zrinjski
- Longest winning run: 7 matches Sarajevo
- Longest unbeaten run: 13 matches Borac
- Longest winless run: 27 matches Gradina
- Longest losing run: 11 matches Gradina
- Highest attendance: 13,000; Sarajevo 1:0 Željezničar
- Lowest attendance: 100^{1}
- Total attendance: 315,700
- Average attendance: 1,326^{1}

The 2012–13 Premier League of Bosnia and Herzegovina (known as BH Telecom Premier League for sponsorship reasons) was the thirteenth season of the Premier League of Bosnia and Herzegovina, the highest football league of Bosnia and Herzegovina, since its original establishment in 2000 and eleventh as a unified country-wide league. The season began on 4 August 2012 and ended on 26 May 2013, with a winter break between 26 November 2012 and 2 March 2013. The official fixture schedule was released on 3 July 2012.

Željezničar was able to defend the title this season, as they were the defending champions of the last season, having won their seventh domestic league title this season with two rounds left playing. A total of 16 teams contested the league, including 14 sides from the 2011–12 season and one promoted club from each of the two-second-level leagues, Gradina from 2011–12 First League of the Federation of Bosnia and Herzegovina and Radnik from 2011–12 First League of the Republika Srpska who replace relegated Sloboda and Kozara.

== Teams ==
A total of 16 teams contested the league, including 14 sides from the 2011–12 season and two promoted from each of the second-level league, 2011–12 First League of the Federation of Bosnia and Herzegovina and 2011–12 First League of the Republika Srpska.

While relegation of Kozara was confirmed couple of rounds before the end of the last season, Sloboda were relegated only after all the result of the last round were known. Kozara returned to First League of the Republika Srpska after only one season in top flight, while Sloboda were relegated for the first time after 43 years in the highest tier, including also as part of Yugoslav First League.

The relegated teams were replaced by the champions of the two-second–level leagues, Gradina from the First League of the Federation of Bosnia and Herzegovina and Radnik from the First League of the Republika Srpska. Radnik returned to the top flight after spending five years in lower tier, while Gradina made their debut in the Premier League.

=== Stadiums and locations ===
Location of clubs in 2012–13 Premijer Liga

| Team | Location | Stadium | Capacity |
|---|---|---|---|
| Borac | Banja Luka | Gradski stadion, Banja Luka | 13,730 |
| Čelik | Zenica | Bilino Polje^{1} | 15,292 |
| GOŠK | Gabela | Podavala | 3,000 |
| Gradina | Srebrenik | Gradski stadion, Srebrenik^{2} | 8,000 |
| Leotar | Trebinje | Police | 8,550 |
| Olimpic | Sarajevo | Otoka^{3} | 3,000 |
| Radnik | Bijeljina | Gradski stadion, Bijeljina | 6,000 |
| Rudar | Prijedor | Gradski Stadion, Prijedor | 5,000 |
| Sarajevo | Sarajevo | Asim Ferhatović Hase | 35,630 |
| Slavija | Istočno Sarajevo | Gradski SRC Slavija | 6,000 |
| Široki Brijeg | Široki Brijeg | Pecara | 5,628 |
| Travnik | Travnik | Pirota | 3,200 |
| Velež | Mostar | Vrapčići | 5,294 |
| Zrinjski | Mostar | Bijeli Brijeg | 20,000 |
| Zvijezda | Gradačac | Banja Ilidža | 5,000 |
| Željezničar | Sarajevo | Grbavica | 16,100 |

^{1} Čelik has played in round 2 and 4 on Kamberović polje due to works on the pitch of Bilino Polje, which included installing of a new drainage and under-soil heating, as well as the replacement of the turf, sound system and bench for the reserve players. They returned to Bilino Polje on round 6 against Borac.
^{2} Gradina played their home matches in the first half of the season on Banja Ilidža and NC Goal (only round 6 and 8) due to their own stadium Gradski Stadion, Srebrenik not fulfilling the necessary requirements, but for the second half of the season their stadium got a conditional license to host Premier League matches.
^{3} Olimpic decided to play its home games in the second half of the season in Tuzla on Tušanj stadium instead of Otoka stadium which they used in the first half of the season but in the end played only one game on it (round 17). Already the next home game (round 20) they returned to their regular home stadium – Otoka stadium.

=== Personnel and kits ===
Note: Flags indicate national team as has been defined under FIFA eligibility rules. Players may hold more than one non-FIFA nationality.

| Team | Manager | Captain | Kit manufacturer | Shirt Sponsor |
|---|---|---|---|---|
| Borac | (Bosnia and Herzegovina) Branislav Krunić (Caretaker) | (Bosnia and Herzegovina) Draško Žarić | NAAI | m:tel |
| Čelik | (Bosnia and Herzegovina) Vlado Jagodić | (Bosnia and Herzegovina) Kenan Horić | Joma | RM-LH |
| GOŠK | (Croatia) Davor Mladina | (Bosnia and Herzegovina) Zlatko Kojić | Jako | Habitus / Ledo |
| Gradina | (Bosnia and Herzegovina) Fuad Grbešić | (Bosnia and Herzegovina) Malik Smajlović | NAAI | — |
| Leotar | (Serbia) Vladimir Gaćinović | (Bosnia and Herzegovina) (Serbia) Zdravko Šaraba | Kappa | Elnos |
| Olimpic | (Bosnia and Herzegovina) Nedim Jusufbegović | (Serbia) Miloš Vidović | NAAI | Europlakat |
| Radnik | (Bosnia and Herzegovina) Srđan Bajić | (Bosnia and Herzegovina) Nenad Kutlačić | Adidas | — |
| Rudar | (Bosnia and Herzegovina) Vlado Čapljić | (Bosnia and Herzegovina) Goran Kotaran | NAAI | Optima / ArcelorMittal |
| Sarajevo | (Bosnia and Herzegovina) Husref Musemić | (Bosnia and Herzegovina) Muhamed Džakmić | Lescon / Haad | Vakufska banka |
| Slavija | (Bosnia and Herzegovina) Milomir Šešlija | (Bosnia and Herzegovina) Ratko Dujković | Joma | Nova Banka |
| Široki Brijeg | (Bosnia and Herzegovina) (Croatia) Slaven Musa | (Bosnia and Herzegovina) (Croatia) Dalibor Šilić | Jako | Mepas |
| Travnik | (Bosnia and Herzegovina) Nermin Bašić | (Bosnia and Herzegovina) Elvedin Varupa | Joma | ADK |
| Velež | (Bosnia and Herzegovina) Ibrahim Rahimić | (Bosnia and Herzegovina) Admir Kajtaz | NAAI | Bosnalijek |
| Zrinjski | (Croatia) Branko Karačić | (Bosnia and Herzegovina) (Croatia) Igor Melher | Zeus | HT-ERONET |
| Zvijezda | (Bosnia and Herzegovina) Milomir Odović | (Bosnia and Herzegovina) Amir Hamzić | NAAI | — |
| Željezničar | (Bosnia and Herzegovina) Amar Osim | (Bosnia and Herzegovina) Muamer Svraka | Patrick | Sarajevo Osiguranje |

=== Managerial changes ===
| Team | Outgoing manager | Manner of departure | Date of vacancy | Position in table | Replaced by | Date of appointment |
|---|---|---|---|---|---|---|
| Zrinjski | (Croatia) (Bosnia and Herzegovina) Dragan Perić (Caretaker) | Promoted | 19 June 2012 | Off-season | (Croatia) (Bosnia and Herzegovina) Dragan Perić | 19 June 2012 |
| Čelik | (Bosnia and Herzegovina) Vlatko Glavaš | Resigned | 22 June 2012 | Off-season | (Bosnia and Herzegovina) Vlado Jagodić | 22 June 2012 |
| GOŠK | (Bosnia and Herzegovina) Boris Gavran | End of contract | 25 June 2012 | Off-season | (Bosnia and Herzegovina) (Croatia) Slaven Musa | 26 June 2012 |
| Travnik | (Bosnia and Herzegovina) Husnija Arapović | End of contract | 28 June 2012 | Off-season | (Bosnia and Herzegovina) Nermin Bašić | 28 June 2012 |
| Leotar | (Bosnia and Herzegovina) Borče Sredojević | Resigned | 6 July 2012 | Off-season | (Serbia) Vladimir Gaćinović | 9 July 2012 |
| Borac | (Serbia) Slaviša Božičić | Sacked | 13 July 2012 | Off-season | (Bosnia and Herzegovina) Slobodan Starčević (Caretaker) | 13 July 2012 |
| Borac | (Bosnia and Herzegovina) Slobodan Starčević (Caretaker) | Promoted | 19 July 2012 | Off-season | (Bosnia and Herzegovina) Slobodan Starčević | 19 July 2012 |
| Široki Brijeg | (Slovenia) Marijan Bloudek | Mutual agreement | 6 August 2012 | 11th | (Bosnia and Herzegovina) (Croatia) Slaven Musa | 13 August 2012 |
| GOŠK | (Bosnia and Herzegovina) (Croatia) Slaven Musa | Signed by Široki Brijeg | 13 August 2012 | 3rd | (Bosnia and Herzegovina) Dario Zadro | 16 August 2012 |
| Radnik | (Bosnia and Herzegovina) Darko Nestorović | Resigned | 27 August 2012 | 15th | (Bosnia and Herzegovina) Jovica Lukić (Caretaker) | 28 August 2012 |
| Gradina | (Bosnia and Herzegovina) Samir Adanalić | Resigned | 27 August 2012 | 14th | (Bosnia and Herzegovina) Denis Sadiković | 29 August 2012 |
| Radnik | (Bosnia and Herzegovina) Jovica Lukić (Caretaker) | End of tenure as caretaker | 3 September 2012 | 15th | (Bosnia and Herzegovina) Srđan Bajić | 3 September 2012 |
| GOŠK | (Bosnia and Herzegovina) Dario Zadro | Resigned | 5 September 2012 | 13th | (Croatia) Ivan Katalinić | 5 September 2012 |
| Olimpic | (Bosnia and Herzegovina) Nedim Jusufbegović | Sacked | 19 September 2012 | 7th | (Bosnia and Herzegovina) Husref Musemić | 20 September 2012 |
| Gradina | (Bosnia and Herzegovina) Denis Sadiković | Signed by Sloboda | 20 September 2012 | 16th | (Bosnia and Herzegovina) Boris Gavran | 20 September 2012 |
| Velež | (Bosnia and Herzegovina) Asmir Džafić | Mutual agreement | 24 September 2012 | 13th | (Bosnia and Herzegovina) Ibrahim Rahimić | 25 September 2012 |
| Gradina | (Bosnia and Herzegovina) Boris Gavran | Resigned | 24 September 2012 | 16th | (Bosnia and Herzegovina) Nedžad Bajrović | 24 September 2012 |
| Gradina | (Bosnia and Herzegovina) Nedžad Bajrović | Sacked | 11 October 2012 | 16th | (Bosnia and Herzegovina) Fuad Grbešić | 11 October 2012 |
| GOŠK | (Croatia) Ivan Katalinić | Sacked | 27 November 2012 | 15th | (Croatia) Davor Mladina | 11 January 2013 |
| Slavija | (Serbia) Vlado Čapljić | Resigned | 10 December 2012 | 4th | (Bosnia and Herzegovina) Milomir Šešlija | 4 January 2013 |
| Zvijezda | (Serbia) Zoran Kuntić | Signed by SzTK-Erima | 19 December 2012 | 13th | (Bosnia and Herzegovina) Milomir Odović | 29 December 2012 |
| Travnik | (Bosnia and Herzegovina) Nermin Bašić | Resigned | 15 January 2013 | 14th | (Bosnia and Herzegovina) Elvedin Beganović | 17 January 2013 |
| Olimpic | (Bosnia and Herzegovina) Husref Musemić | Sacked | 10 February 2013 | 3rd | (Bosnia and Herzegovina) Denis Sadiković | 10 February 2013 |
| Sarajevo | (Bosnia and Herzegovina) Dragan Jović | Sacked | 16 March 2013 | 2nd | (Bosnia and Herzegovina) Husref Musemić | 19 March 2013 |
| Rudar | (Bosnia and Herzegovina) Velimir Stojnić | Mutual Agreement | 22 March 2013 | 11th | (Serbia) Vlado Čapljić | 24 March 2013 |
| Zrinjski | (Croatia) (Bosnia and Herzegovina) Dragan Perić | Resigned | 31 March 2013 | 7th | (Croatia) Branko Karačić | 1 April 2013 |
| Olimpic | (Bosnia and Herzegovina) Denis Sadiković | Mutual Agreement | 11 April 2013 | 5th | (Bosnia and Herzegovina) Nedim Jusufbegović | 11 April 2013 |
| Travnik | (Bosnia and Herzegovina) Elvedin Beganović | Sacked | 22 April 2013 | 14th | (Bosnia and Herzegovina) Nermin Bašić | 22 April 2013 |
| Borac | (Bosnia and Herzegovina) Slobodan Starčević | Sacked | 21 May 2013 | 4th | (Bosnia and Herzegovina) Branislav Krunić (Caretaker) | 21 May 2013 |

== Season events ==
=== Sponsorship of the league ===
On 31 July 2012, an agreement between Football Federation of Bosnia and Herzegovina and BH Telecom was reached regarding sponsorship of the league. The contract worth about 2 million KM was signed on two years, officially renaming the league to BH Telecom Premier League. At first, two clubs, Željezničar and Široki Brijeg, didn't want to agree on the terms of the sponsorship contract because it, as they say, was humiliating for their clubs and that not all clubs in the league can be treated the same way regarding sponsorship. In the end, with few adjustments for those two clubs, the contract was officially signed.

=== Ban on away fans lifted ===
On 31 July 2012, the ban on organized attendance of away fans has been lifted. The ban was on power since 8 October 2011 after a couple of incidents, all done by Ultras groups. Also, if one club will have their supporters on an away game they must inform the other club and the football federation 4 days prior to the match.

=== Ban on away fans conditionally reactivated ===
After, once again, ultras groups made serious incidents, including derogatory chanting and attempted attack on away fans on match of round 2 between Željezničar and Borac on Grbavica stadium, the same in round 5 between once again Željezničar and this time Slavija, demolishing a pub by The Maniacs, ultras supporters of Željezničar, who arrived in Herzegovina without announcement to the local police in Mostar. The pub was a gathering point of Ultras Zrinjski, ultras group supporting HŠK Zrinjski Mostar and this happened before a match in round 6 between Zrinjski and Željezničar. In an act of revenge, some of Ultras Zrinjski demolished a pub in another part of the city where they thought The Maniacs were. Also, on the same day, after returning from an away match of round 6 between Čelik and Borac, Lešinari, ultras group supporting Borac, demolished two train wagons, while the next day someone burned down a van in which about 12 supporters of Slavija, so-called Sokolovi, were returning from an away match of round 6 between GOŠK and Slavija (only the driver was slightly injured). After all this, the Football Federation of Bosnia and Herzegovina decided to bring up a conditional ban on away fans which will be activated after any serious incident on or before a football match of the Premier League of Bosnia and Herzegovina or in the Bosnia and Herzegovina Football Cup. Overall, in the first five round of the league the disciplinary commission of Football Federation of Bosnia and Herzegovina distributed penalties in the amount of almost €32000.

== League table ==
| Pos | Team | Pld | W | D | L | GF | GA | GD | Pts | Qualification or relegation |
|---|---|---|---|---|---|---|---|---|---|---|
| 1 | Željezničar (C) | 30 | 20 | 6 | 4 | 48 | 20 | +28 | 66 | Qualification to Champions League second qualifying round |
| 2 | Sarajevo | 30 | 17 | 9 | 4 | 52 | 19 | +33 | 60 | Qualification to Europa League first qualifying round |
| 3 | Borac Banja Luka | 30 | 14 | 9 | 7 | 43 | 25 | +18 | 51 | Ineligible for 2013–14 European competitions (Note: Borac Banja Luka, Čelik, Olimpic, Slavija and Leotar failed to get the UEFA license for the competition due to financial or infrastructural problems.) |
| 4 | Čelik | 30 | 14 | 9 | 7 | 44 | 30 | +14 | 51 | Ineligible for 2013–14 European competitions |
| 5 | Olimpic | 30 | 13 | 10 | 7 | 34 | 26 | +8 | 49 | Ineligible for 2013–14 European competitions |
| 6 | Široki Brijeg | 30 | 13 | 6 | 11 | 48 | 31 | +17 | 45 | Qualification to Europa League second qualifying round (Note: Široki Brijeg qualified for 2013–14 UEFA Europe League second qualifying round as the national cup winner.) |
| 7 | Slavija | 30 | 12 | 7 | 11 | 29 | 28 | +1 | 43 | Ineligible for 2013–14 European competitions |
| 8 | Leotar | 30 | 10 | 9 | 11 | 28 | 40 | −12 | 39 | Ineligible for 2013–14 European competitions |
| 9 | Zrinjski | 30 | 11 | 6 | 13 | 26 | 42 | −16 | 39 | Qualification to Europa League first qualifying round |
| 10 | Rudar Prijedor | 30 | 10 | 6 | 14 | 37 | 42 | −5 | 36 | |
| 11 | Zvijezda | 30 | 10 | 6 | 14 | 38 | 44 | −6 | 36 | |
| 12 | Radnik | 30 | 8 | 11 | 11 | 27 | 35 | −8 | 35 | |
| 13 | Velež | 30 | 8 | 10 | 12 | 31 | 34 | −3 | 34 | |
| 14 | Travnik | 30 | 9 | 7 | 14 | 29 | 45 | −16 | 34 | |
| 15 | GOŠK Gabela (R) | 30 | 7 | 9 | 14 | 29 | 42 | −13 | 30 | Relegation to Prva Liga FBiH |
| 16 | Gradina Srebrenik (R) | 30 | 1 | 6 | 23 | 17 | 57 | −40 | 9 | Relegation to Prva Liga FBiH |

Source: SportSport.ba (in Bosnian)
Rules for classification: 1st points; 2nd goal difference; 3rd goals scored
For deciding champions, qualification to UEFA Europa League and relegation: 1st points; 2nd head-to-head points; 3rd head-to-head goal difference; 4th head-to-head goals scored; 5th head-to-head away goals scored; 6th goal difference; 7th goals scored
(C) Champions; (R) Relegated

=== Positions by round ===
| Team ╲ Round | 1 | 2 | 3 | 4 | 5 | 6 | 7 | 8 | 9 | 10 | 11 | 12 | 13 | 14 | 15 | 16 | 17 | 18 | 19 | 20 | 21 | 22 | 23 | 24 | 25 | 26 | 27 | 28 | 29 | 30 |
|---|---|---|---|---|---|---|---|---|---|---|---|---|---|---|---|---|---|---|---|---|---|---|---|---|---|---|---|---|---|---|
| Borac Banja Luka | 1 | 7 | 11 | 12 | 10 | 10 | 5 | 4 | 4 | 5 | 5 | 6 | 8 | 7 | 7 | 7 | 7 | 5 | 3 | 3 | 3 | 3 | 3 | 3 | 3 | 3 | 3 | 4 | 4 | 3 |
| Čelik | 12 | 2 | 8 | 5 | 8 | 9 | 10 | 10 | 12 | 11 | 10 | 11 | 10 | 9 | 10 | 8 | 8 | 8 | 8 | 6 | 8 | 6 | 7 | 6 | 5 | 5 | 5 | 5 | 5 | 4 |
| GOŠK Gabela | 7 | 3 | 9 | 11 | 13 | 13 | 12 | 13 | 14 | 14 | 15 | 14 | 15 | 14 | 15 | 13 | 14 | 15 | 15 | 15 | 15 | 15 | 15 | 15 | 15 | 15 | 15 | 15 | 15 | 15 |
| Gradina Srebrenik | 4 | 11 | 13 | 14 | 16 | 16 | 16 | 16 | 16 | 16 | 16 | 16 | 16 | 16 | 16 | 16 | 16 | 16 | 16 | 16 | 16 | 16 | 16 | 16 | 16 | 16 | 16 | 16 | 16 | 16 |
| Leotar | 3 | 5 | 4 | 7 | 3 | 5 | 7 | 8 | 6 | 8 | 8 | 8 | 7 | 8 | 8 | 9 | 9 | 10 | 9 | 8 | 7 | 8 | 8 | 8 | 8 | 8 | 9 | 9 | 10 | 8 |
| Olimpic | 5 | 10 | 6 | 9 | 11 | 7 | 6 | 5 | 7 | 6 | 7 | 7 | 5 | 4 | 3 | 3 | 3 | 3 | 4 | 4 | 5 | 4 | 4 | 4 | 4 | 4 | 4 | 3 | 3 | 5 |
| Radnik | 15 | 15 | 15 | 15 | 15 | 15 | 15 | 14 | 15 | 15 | 14 | 15 | 13 | 14 | 11 | 11 | 11 | 9 | 10 | 10 | 11 | 12 | 13 | 11 | 10 | 11 | 10 | 10 | 11 | 12 |
| Rudar Prijedor | 6 | 14 | 10 | 6 | 9 | 6 | 8 | 6 | 8 | 9 | 9 | 9 | 9 | 10 | 9 | 10 | 10 | 11 | 12 | 11 | 10 | 10 | 10 | 13 | 13 | 12 | 13 | 13 | 13 | 10 |
| Sarajevo | 9 | 1 | 1 | 2 | 1 | 1 | 1 | 1 | 1 | 1 | 1 | 1 | 1 | 1 | 2 | 2 | 2 | 2 | 2 | 2 | 2 | 2 | 2 | 2 | 2 | 2 | 2 | 2 | 2 | 2 |
| Slavija | 10 | 6 | 3 | 3 | 4 | 4 | 4 | 7 | 5 | 4 | 3 | 5 | 6 | 5 | 4 | 6 | 5 | 6 | 6 | 7 | 6 | 7 | 6 | 7 | 7 | 6 | 6 | 7 | 6 | 7 |
| Široki Brijeg | 11 | 12 | 7 | 7 | 7 | 8 | 9 | 9 | 9 | 7 | 6 | 4 | 4 | 3 | 6 | 5 | 4 | 4 | 5 | 5 | 4 | 5 | 5 | 5 | 6 | 7 | 7 | 6 | 7 | 6 |
| Travnik | 13 | 13 | 14 | 13 | 12 | 12 | 11 | 11 | 10 | 12 | 11 | 12 | 12 | 12 | 14 | 15 | 15 | 14 | 13 | 14 | 14 | 14 | 14 | 14 | 14 | 14 | 14 | 14 | 14 | 14 |
| Velež | 2 | 8 | 12 | 8 | 6 | 11 | 13 | 12 | 13 | 10 | 12 | 10 | 11 | 11 | 12 | 14 | 13 | 12 | 11 | 12 | 12 | 11 | 11 | 12 | 11 | 10 | 11 | 11 | 12 | 13 |
| Zrinjski | 14 | 9 | 5 | 4 | 5 | 3 | 3 | 3 | 3 | 3 | 4 | 3 | 3 | 6 | 5 | 4 | 6 | 7 | 7 | 9 | 9 | 9 | 9 | 9 | 9 | 9 | 8 | 8 | 8 | 9 |
| Zvijezda | 16 | 16 | 16 | 16 | 14 | 14 | 14 | 15 | 11 | 13 | 13 | 13 | 14 | 15 | 13 | 12 | 12 | 13 | 14 | 13 | 13 | 13 | 12 | 10 | 12 | 13 | 12 | 12 | 9 | 11 |
| Željezničar | 8 | 4 | 2 | 1 | 2 | 2 | 2 | 2 | 2 | 2 | 2 | 2 | 2 | 2 | 1 | 1 | 1 | 1 | 1 | 1 | 1 | 1 | 1 | 1 | 1 | 1 | 1 | 1 | 1 | 1 |

| Leader |
| 2013–14 UEFA Europa League First qualifying round |
| Relegation to 2013–14 Prva Liga FBiH or 2013–14 Prva Liga RS |

Source: SportSport.ba

== Results ==
| Home \ Away | BOR | ČEL | GŠK | GRA | LEO | OLI | RAD | RPR | SAR | SLA | ŠB | TRA | VEL | ZRI | ZVI | ŽEL |
|---|---|---|---|---|---|---|---|---|---|---|---|---|---|---|---|---|
| Borac Banja Luka | | 2–0 | 1–0 | 1–0 | 5–0 | 2–1 | 1–0 | 4–0 | 1–1 | 1–2 | 0–0 | 2–2 | 1–0 | 5–1 | 3–0 | 2–0 |
| Čelik | 1–1 | | 2–1 | 2–1 | 1–1 | 1–1 | 2–2 | 2–1 | 3–2 | 4–1 | 2–1 | 2–1 | 2–0 | 2–0 | 4–1 | 1–2 |
| GOŠK Gabela | 0–2 | 0–0 | | 1–0 | 3–1 | 1–1 | 0–0 | 1–1 | 0–2 | 0–0 | 3–2 | 3–1 | 0–1 | 0–1 | 1–0 | 2–3 |
| Gradina Srebrenik | 1–3 | 0–1 | 1–1 | | 0–1 | 1–1 | 1–0 | 0–2 | 0–0 | 0–0 | 2–2 | 0–1 | 1–3 | 1–2 | 1–3 | 1–2 |
| Leotar | 2–0 | 1–0 | 4–2 | 3–0 | | 1–0 | 1–2 | 2–1 | 0–3 | 2–0 | 1–3 | 1–3 | 0–0 | 1–0 | 1–1 | 0–2 |
| Olimpic | 1–1 | 0–2 | 1–0 | 2–1 | 1–0 | | 1–0 | 1–1 | 0–1 | 1–0 | 2–1 | 2–0 | 1–1 | 0–0 | 2–1 | 1–2 |
| Radnik | 0–0 | 2–2 | 1–1 | 1–0 | 0–0 | 0–0 | | 1–0 | 2–1 | 2–0 | 4–0 | 2–2 | 2–1 | 2–0 | 0–0 | 0–3 |
| Rudar Prijedor | 1–1 | 1–1 | 1–1 | 4–0 | 3–1 | 1–2 | 2–0 | | 1–3 | 0–1 | 2–1 | 1–0 | 2–3 | 4–1 | 2–0 | 1–3 |
| Sarajevo | 2–0 | 0–0 | 4–0 | 3–1 | 0–0 | 3–1 | 5–0 | 3–0 | | 1–0 | 2–1 | 1–0 | 4–1 | 1–0 | 4–1 | 1–0 |
| Slavija | 1–2 | 2–1 | 2–1 | 2–1 | 0–0 | 0–1 | 1–0 | 3–1 | 0–0 | | 0–1 | 1–0 | 2–0 | 1–1 | 1–0 | 1–2 |
| Široki Brijeg | 4–0 | 0–1 | 5–0 | 2–0 | 1–1 | 0–0 | 2–0 | 2–1 | 2–1 | 0–0 | | 5–0 | 2–1 | 3–0 | 1–0 | 4–1 |
| Travnik | 1–1 | 2–1 | 0–0 | 2–0 | 1–1 | 2–3 | 2–1 | 0–1 | 1–0 | 1–2 | 2–1 | | 0–0 | 0–1 | 2–1 | 0–0 |
| Velež | 1–0 | 2–1 | 1–3 | 1–1 | 1–1 | 1–1 | 3–0 | 0–1 | 0–0 | 0–3 | 0–0 | 6–0 | | 1–1 | 2–1 | 0–0 |
| Zrinjski | 1–0 | 0–2 | 0–3 | 2–1 | 2–0 | 1–4 | 2–1 | 0–0 | 2–2 | 2–1 | 1–0 | 1–2 | 2–1 | | 1–2 | 1–0 |
| Zvijezda | 1–1 | 1–0 | 2–1 | 5–1 | 0–1 | 0–2 | 1–1 | 4–1 | 2–2 | 1–1 | 2–1 | 3–1 | 1–0 | 2–0 | | 1–4 |
| Željezničar | 1–0 | 1–1 | 2–0 | 4–0 | 4–0 | 1–0 | 1–1 | 1–0 | 0–0 | 2–0 | 2–1 | 2–0 | 1–0 | 0–0 | 2–1 | |

Source: SportSport.ba
Legend: Blue = home team win; Yellow = draw; Red = away team win.

=== Clubs season-progress ===
| Team ╲ Round | 1 | 2 | 3 | 4 | 5 | 6 | 7 | 8 | 9 | 10 | 11 | 12 | 13 | 14 | 15 | 16 | 17 | 18 | 19 | 20 | 21 | 22 | 23 | 24 | 25 | 26 | 27 | 28 | 29 | 30 |
|---|---|---|---|---|---|---|---|---|---|---|---|---|---|---|---|---|---|---|---|---|---|---|---|---|---|---|---|---|---|---|
| Borac Banja Luka | W | L | L | L | W | D | W | W | W | L | W | L | D | D | W | D | W | W | W | D | W | D | W | D | D | L | W | L | D | W |
| Čelik | D | W | L | W | L | D | L | L | L | W | D | D | W | W | D | W | L | D | W | W | L | W | D | W | W | D | W | D | W | W |
| GOŠK Gabela | D | W | L | L | L | D | W | L | L | D | L | D | D | D | L | W | L | D | L | L | L | L | W | W | D | W | L | W | D | L |
| Gradina Srebrenik | D | D | L | L | L | D | L | L | L | L | L | L | L | L | L | L | L | D | D | L | L | L | L | L | L | D | L | W | L | L |
| Leotar | W | D | W | L | W | L | L | D | W | L | D | W | W | L | D | L | L | D | W | W | W | D | D | L | D | L | L | D | L | W |
| Olimpic | D | D | W | L | D | W | D | W | L | W | L | W | W | W | D | W | W | D | L | L | L | W | W | D | W | L | W | D | D | L |
| Radnik | L | D | L | D | L | D | D | W | L | D | D | L | W | L | W | W | W | W | L | D | D | L | L | W | D | D | W | L | D | L |
| Rudar Prijedor | D | L | W | L | L | W | L | W | L | L | D | W | L | D | W | L | L | L | L | W | W | D | L | L | L | W | L | D | D | W |
| Sarajevo | D | W | W | W | W | W | W | W | L | W | D | W | D | W | L | L | W | D | W | W | D | D | L | W | D | W | D | W | D | W |
| Slavija | D | W | W | W | L | D | D | L | W | W | W | L | D | W | D | L | W | L | D | L | W | L | W | L | W | D | L | L | W | L |
| Široki Brijeg | D | L | W | L | W | D | D | L | W | W | W | W | D | W | L | W | W | L | L | L | W | L | W | D | D | L | L | W | L | W |
| Travnik | D | L | L | D | W | L | W | L | W | L | D | L | D | D | L | L | L | W | W | L | L | W | L | L | D | W | W | L | D | W |
| Velež | W | L | L | W | D | L | L | D | L | W | L | W | L | L | L | L | W | W | D | D | D | W | D | D | D | W | L | D | L | D |
| Zrinjski | L | W | W | W | L | W | D | W | W | L | D | W | L | L | W | W | L | L | L | L | D | W | L | L | L | L | W | D | D | D |
| Zvijezda | L | L | L | L | W | D | W | L | W | L | D | L | L | L | W | D | W | L | D | W | D | L | W | W | L | L | W | D | W | L |
| Željezničar | D | W | W | W | W | L | D | W | W | W | W | L | W | W | W | W | L | W | W | W | D | W | D | W | W | W | D | D | W | L |

Source: SportSport.ba
W = Win; D = Draw; L = Lose

== Season statistics ==
=== Transfers ===
For the list of transfers involving First League clubs during 2012–13 season, please see: List of Bosnia and Herzegovina football transfers summer 2012 and List of Bosnia and Herzegovina football transfers winter 2012–13.

=== Top goalscorers ===
| Rank | Player | Club | Goals |
|---|---|---|---|
| 1 | (Bosnia and Herzegovina) Emir Hadžić | Sarajevo | 20 |
| 2 | (Bosnia and Herzegovina) Eldin Adilović | Željezničar | 18 |
| 3 | (Bosnia and Herzegovina) Krešimir Kordić | Široki Brijeg | 12 |
| 3 | (Bosnia and Herzegovina) Saša Kajkut | Čelik | 12 |
| 3 | (Bosnia and Herzegovina) Jovica Stokić | Borac | 12 |
| 6 | (Bosnia and Herzegovina) Jasmin Mešanović | Čelik | 10 |
| 7 | (Serbia) Marko Basara | Radnik | 9 |

* Italic highlights the former club, while bold the current one.

=== Top assists ===
| Rank | Player | Club | Assists |
|---|---|---|---|
| 1 | (Bosnia and Herzegovina) Darko Maletić | Borac Banja Luka | 6 |
| 2 | (Bosnia and Herzegovina) Srđan Grahovac | Borac Banja Luka | 5 |
| 2 | (Bosnia and Herzegovina) Vedran Kantar | Borac Banja Luka | 5 |
| 2 | (Bosnia and Herzegovina) Jovica Stokić | Borac Banja Luka | 5 |
| 5 | (Bosnia and Herzegovina) Almir Bekić | GOŠK | 4 |
| 5 | (Bosnia and Herzegovina) Anel Hebibović | Velež | 4 |
| 5 | (Bosnia and Herzegovina) Zoran Kokot | Slavija | 4 |
| 5 | (Bosnia and Herzegovina) Ševko Okić | Velež | 4 |
| 5 | (Bosnia and Herzegovina) Ivan Sesar | Sarajevo / Elazığspor | 4 |
| 10 | (Bosnia and Herzegovina) Zoran Belošević | Sarajevo | 3 |
| 10 | (Bosnia and Herzegovina) Dino Ćorić | Široki Brijeg | 3 |
| 10 | (Bosnia and Herzegovina) Edin Dudo | Slavija | 3 |
| 10 | (Serbia) Borivoje Filipović | Leotar | 3 |
| 10 | (Bosnia and Herzegovina) Emir Hadžić | Sarajevo | 3 |
| 10 | (Bosnia and Herzegovina) Jure Ivanković | Široki Brijeg | 3 |
| 10 | (Bosnia and Herzegovina) Sabahudin Jusufbašić | GOŠK Gabela | 3 |
| 10 | (Bosnia and Herzegovina) Marsel Mace | Velež | 3 |
| 10 | (Bosnia and Herzegovina) Veldin Muharemović | Olimpic | 3 |
| 10 | (Bosnia and Herzegovina) Dalibor Šilić | Široki Brijeg | 3 |
| 10 | (Bosnia and Herzegovina) Pero Stojkić | Zrinjski | 3 |
| 10 | (Bosnia and Herzegovina) Asmir Suljić | Sarajevo | 3 |
| 10 | (Brazil) Wagner | Široki Brijeg | 3 |

* Italic highlights the former club, while bold the current one.

=== Hat-tricks ===
| Player | For | Against | Result | Date |
|---|---|---|---|---|
| (Bosnia and Herzegovina) Emir Hadžić | Sarajevo | GOŠK | 4–0 | 2 September 2012 |
| (Bosnia and Herzegovina) Mirza Ćemalović | Velež | Travnik | 6–0 | 20 October 2012 |
| (Bosnia and Herzegovina) Saša Kajkut | Čelik | Sarajevo | 3–2 | 2 March 2013 |
| (Bosnia and Herzegovina) Nemanja Bilbija^{4} | Borac | Zrinjski | 5–1 | 30 March 2013 |
| (Bosnia and Herzegovina) Krešimir Kordić^{4} | Široki Brijeg | Borac | 4–0 | 11 May 2013 |
| (Bosnia and Herzegovina) Eldin Adilović | Željezničar | Leotar | 4–0 | 18 May 2013 |
| (Bosnia and Herzegovina) Emir Hadžić^{5} | Sarajevo | Radnik | 5–0 | 26 May 2013 |

- ^{4} Player scored 4 goals
- ^{5} Player scored 5 goals

=== Clean sheets ===
- Most Clean Sheets: 17
  - Sarajevo
- Fewest clean sheets: 3
  - Gradina

== Attendances ==
| # | Club | Average |
|---|---|---|
| 1 | Željezničar | 3,707 |
| 2 | Sarajevo | 3,493 |
| 3 | Čelik | 2,780 |
| 4 | Borac | 1,660 |
| 5 | Zrinjski | 1,533 |
| 6 | Zvijezda | 1,307 |
| 7 | Travnik | 827 |
| 8 | Olimpik | 827 |
| 9 | Velež | 807 |
| 10 | Rudar | 787 |
| 11 | Radnik | 730 |
| 12 | Slavija | 727 |
| 13 | Leotar | 687 |
| 14 | Gradina | 597 |
| 15 | Široki | 570 |
| 16 | GOŠK | 487 |

== Notes ==
- ^{1}Without matches played without spectators because of a suspension of a stadium by Football Federation of Bosnia and Herzegovina.

== See also ==
- 2012–13 Bosnia and Herzegovina Football Cup
