= Bajrović =

Bajrović is a Bosnian patronymic surname derived from the given name Bajro. Notable people include:

- Admir Bajrovic (born 1995), Swedish footballer
- Izudin Bajrović (born 1963), Bosnian actor
- Nedžad Bajrović (born 1970), Bosnian footballer
- Reuf Bajrović (born 1977), Bosnian-American politician
