= Matijas =

Matijas is both a given name and a surname. Notable people with the name include:

- Jonathan Matijas (born 1990), French-Algerian footballer
- Matijas Pejić (born 1988), Bosnian footballer

== See also ==
- Matias
- Matija, given name
- Matthew (name)
