= Jasmin Moranjkić =

Bosnian football manager (born 1983)

Personal information
- Date of birth: 11 October 1983 (age 43)
- Place of birth: Vlasenica, SFR Yugoslavia
- Position: Midfielder

Senior career*
Years	Team	Apps	(Gls)
2003–2007	Sloboda Tuzla	0	(0)
2007–2009	Čelik Zenica	39	(0)
2009–2014	Zvijezda Gradačac	96	(1)
2014	Sloboda Tuzla	6	(1)
2014–2015	OFK Gradina		
2015–2016	Sloboda Tuzla	10	(2)
2016	Radnički Lukavac	8	(1)
2016	Zvijezda	12	(2)
2017–2018	Sloga Simin Han	20	(0)

International career
2007	Bosnia and Herzegovina (unofficial)	1	(0)

Managerial career
- 2023: Gradina
- 2024–2025: Gradina
- 2025–2026: Bratstvo Gračanica
- * Club domestic league appearances and goals

Jasmin Moranjkić (born 11 October 1983) is a Bosnian professional football manager and former player.

== International career ==
Moranjkić made his debut for Bosnia and Herzegovina in an unofficial friendly match against Poland in December 2007. It remained his sole international appearance.
