= Igor Melher =

Bosnian footballer (born 1979)

Personal information
- Date of birth: 1 November 1979 (age 47)
- Place of birth: Mostar, SFR Yugoslavia
- Height: 1.92 m (6 ft 4 in)
- Position: Goalkeeper

Team information
- Current team: Zrinjski Mostar (goalkeeping coach)

Youth career
- Zrinjski Mostar

Senior career*
Years	Team	Apps	(Gls)
1999–2000	Redarstvenik	36	(0)
2000–2005	Široki Brijeg	102	(0)
2006	Zalaegerszeg	0	(0)
2006–2008	GOŠK Gabela	49	
2008–2014	Zrinjski Mostar	111	(0)
2014–2015	Branitelj	6	

International career
2004	Bosnia and Herzegovina	1	(0)

Managerial career
- 2025–: Zrinjski Mostar (goalkeeping coach)
- * Club domestic league appearances and goals

Igor Melher (born 1 November 1979) is a Bosnian former professional footballer who played as a goalkeeper. He is the current goalkeeping coach of Bosnian Premier League club Zrinjski Mostar.

== International career ==
Melher made his debut for Bosnia and Herzegovina in a March 2004 friendly match against Luxembourg, coming on as a late substitute for Goran Brašnić. It remained his sole international appearance.
