= 2013–14 First League of the Federation of Bosnia and Herzegovina =

First League of the Federation of Bosnia and Herzegovina
- Season: 2013–14
- Champions: Sloboda
- Promoted: Sloboda
- Relegated: Troglav; Iskra
- Matches played: 227
- Goals scored: 586 (2.58 per match)
- Top goalscorer: Muhamed Mujić; Uroš Stojanov (18 goals)
- Biggest home win: 10–0; Bratstvo – Podgrmeč
- Biggest away win: 0–6; Troglav – Sloboda; Troglav – Jedinstvo
- Highest scoring: 10 goals 10–0; Bratstvo – Podgrmeč
- Longest winning run: 8 matches Sloboda
- Longest unbeaten run: 11 matches Jedinstvo
- Longest winless run: 16 matches Troglav
- Longest losing run: 8 matches Troglav
- Highest attendance: 8,500; Sloboda – Jedinstvo 2–0

The 2013–14 First League of the Federation of Bosnia and Herzegovina was the fourteenth edition of the First League of the Federation of Bosnia and Herzegovina as the second-tier league in Bosnia and Herzegovina.

NK Vitez won 2012–13 season and gained promotion to Premier League of Bosnia and Herzegovina.

== Teams in 2013–14 season ==
A total of 16 teams will take part in this season. League winner wins promotion to Premier League with 3–5 teams will get relegated at the end of the season.

=== Changes from 2012–13 season ===
==== Teams left the league ====
- NK Vitez – promoted to the Premier League
- Krajišnik – relegated to the League of Una-Sana Canton^{1}
- Bosna – relegated to the Second League Center
- Goražde – relegated to the Second League Center
- Krajina – relegated to the Second League West
- Troglav – relegated to the Second League South – stayed in the league as Second League West champion decided not to take part in First League

^{1}Krajišnik has left the 2012–13 competition after 15 rounds; FA decided to relegate them to lowest league possible so they were relegated to their respective canton league which stands for 4th level; they will start next competitive season with 6 points deduction

==== Teams entered the league ====
- GOŠK – relegated from the Premier League
- Gradina – relegated from the Premier League
- Igman Konjic – promoted from the Second League South
- Mladost Doboj Kakanj – promoted from the Second League Center
- Orašje – promoted from the Second League North
- Una – promoted from the Second League West – decided not to take part in First League, Troglav stayed in the First League

=== Stadiums and locations ===
Location of clubs in 2013–14 First League of the FBiH

Team	Location	Stadium	Capacity
Branitelj	Rodoč, Mostar	SC Rodoč	500
Bratstvo	Gračanica	Luke	3,000
Budućnost	Banovići	Gradski	4,600
Čapljina	Čapljina	Bjelave	3,000
GOŠK	Gabela	Podavala	3,000
Gradina	Cazin	Gradski	3,000
Igman	Konjic	Gradski stadion	5,000
Iskra	Bugojno	Jaklić	11,000
Jedinstvo	Bihać	Pod Borićima	7,500
Mladost	Doboj, Kakanj	Rudar	4,568
Orašje	Orašje	Goal	4,500
Podgrmeč	Sanski Most	Gradski	1,500
Radnički	Lukavac	Jošik	2,000
Rudar	Kakanj	Rudar	4,568
Sloboda	Tuzla	Tušanj	8,444
Troglav	Livno	Zgona	2,000

== League table ==
Pos	Team	Pld	W	D	L	GF	GA	GD	Pts	Promotion or relegation
1	Sloboda Tuzla (C, P)	30	23	2	5	61	16	+45	71	Promotion to Premijer liga BiH
2	Jedinstvo Bihać	30	21	6	3	50	10	+40	69	
3	Bratstvo Gračanica	30	16	6	8	55	29	+26	54	
4	Rudar Kakanj	30	16	2	12	36	20	+16	50	
5	Orašje	30	14	4	12	45	38	+7	46	
6	Mladost Doboj Kakanj	30	13	4	13	41	36	+5	43	
7	Čapljina	30	13	3	14	51	36	+15	42	
8	GOŠK Gabela	30	11	9	10	40	34	+6	42	
9	Gradina Srebrenik	30	12	5	13	29	30	−1	41	
10	Radnički Lukavac	30	11	7	12	37	27	+10	40	
11	Branitelj	30	11	6	13	39	32	+7	39	
12	Igman	30	12	3	15	37	53	−16	39	
13	Podgrmeč	30	12	3	15	37	61	−24	39	
14	Budućnost	30	12	3	15	39	38	+1	39	
15	Iskra (R)	30	8	3	19	20	58	−38	27	Relegation to Second League FBiH
16	Troglav (Note: Troglav retired from competition after Matchday 20, all remaining games registered with 3–0 against Troglav.) (R)	30	1	2	27	8	98	−90	5	Relegation to Second League FBiH

Source: SportSport.ba (in Bosnian)
Rules for classification: 1st points; 2nd goal difference; 3rd goals scored
For deciding champions, qualification to higher rank and relegation: 1st points; 2nd head-to-head points; 3rd head-to-head goal difference; 4th head-to-head goals scored; 5th head-to-head away goals scored; 6th goal difference; 7th goals scored.
(C) Champions; (P) Promoted; (R) Relegated

== Results ==
Home \ Away	BRA	BRT	BUD	ČAP	GŠK	GRA	IGM	ISK	JED	MDK	ORA	POD	RAL	RKA	SLO	TRO
Branitelj		2–3	2–1	1–1	1–0	3–0	4–0	7–0	0–2	1–0	1–1	1–2	2–2	1–0	0–1	3–0 (Note: Matches registered 3–0 against Troglav as the team retired from competition after Matchday 20.)
Bratstvo Gračanica	2–3		1–2	1–0	2–1	1–1	4–0	4–1	0–0	2–1	2–0	10–0	1–0	2–1	2–0	3–0 (Note: Matches registered 3–0 against Troglav as they failed to show up to the game.)
Budućnost	0–0	2–0		1–3	3–2	1–0	2–0	0–1	1–0	2–1	5–0	7–0	0–1	3–0	1–3	3–0
Čapljina	1–0	1–0	1–2		1–0	1–0	3–2	2–0	0–1	3–0	0–0	5–3	2–2	3–1	0–1	4–0
GOŠK Gabela	2–0	2–2	4–0	1–0		0–0	0–1	0–0	1–1	1–2	0–3	3–0	0–0	1–0	1–0	6–1
Gradina Srebrenik	1–0	1–1	1–0	2–0	3–0		3–0	3–0	0–2	1–0	1–0	2–0	1–0	0–2	0–3	3–0
Igman	1–0	0–1	1–0	3–2	2–2	1–0		4–0	0–4	2–1	3–0	3–2	2–0	1–2	0–2	2–0
Iskra	2–0	0–2	1–0	2–0	2–1	3–2	1–1		0–3	1–3	0–1	1–2	0–2	0–0	0–1	1–0
Jedinstvo Bihać	1–0	0–0	1–0	2–0	2–2	1–0	2–2	4–0		3–0	3–0 (Note: Match registered 3–0 against Orašje as they failed to show up to the game)	1–0	1–0	0–1	3–0	1–0
Mladost Doboj Kakanj	2–0	2–0	1–1	2–3	0–2	4–1	3–2	2–0	0–0		3–1	3–0	1–1	2–0	0–0	3–0
Orašje	2–1	3–0	3–2	2–0	2–3	1–0	2–0	5–0	0–1	2–3		3–0	4–2	1–0	2–0	6–0
Podgrmeč	0–2	3–2	1–0	3–2 (Note: Matches played in Ključ as Podgrmeč's stadium Gradski was suspended until further notice.)	0–0	1–1	4–2	1–0	1–3	1–0	1–1		3–1	1–0	0–1	2–0
Radnički Lukavac	0–0	1–2	4–1	1–0	0–0	0–0	2–1	3–0	0–1	1–0	3–0	1–0		2–0	0–1	7–0
Rudar Kakanj	2–0	1–0	3–0	1–0	1–2	2–0	4–0	1–0	0–1	1–0	2–0	3–0	1–0		1–1	3–0
Sloboda Tuzla	0–1	2–0	2–0	2–0	5–1	3–1	3–0	3–1	2–0	4–0	2–0	3–0	2–1	2–1		6–0
Troglav	3–3 (Note: Match played in Bugojno (Iskra's stadium Jaklić) as Troglav's stadium Zgona was suspended until further notice.)	1–5	2–2	0–3	0–3	0–1 (Note: Matches played in Tomislavgrad (Tomislav's stadium Gradski) as Troglav's stadium Zgona was suspended until further notice.)	0–3	0–3	0–6	0–2	0–3	0–3	1–0	0–2	0–6	

Updated to match(es) played on 28 May 2014. Source: SportSport.ba
Legend: Blue = home team win; Yellow = draw; Red = away team win.

== Statistics ==
=== List of goalscorers ===
Rank	Player	Club	Goals
1	(Bosnia and Herzegovina) Muhamed Mujić	Budućnost	18
1	(Bosnia and Herzegovina) Uroš Stojanov	Jedinstvo	18
3	(Croatia) Željko Malčić	GOŠK Gabela	14
3	(Bosnia and Herzegovina) Damir Smajlović	Bratstvo	14
5	(Bosnia and Herzegovina) Senad Mujić	Orašje	13
6	(Bosnia and Herzegovina) Mirza Kovač	Mladost (DK)	12
7	(Bosnia and Herzegovina) Jasmin Mujkić	Sloboda Tuzla	11
