= Dejan Drakul =

Bosnian footballer (1988–2014)

Personal information
- Date of birth: 23 May 1988
- Place of birth: Gacko, SFR Yugoslavia
- Date of death: 27 May 2014 (aged 26)
- Place of death: Bijeljina, Bosnia and Herzegovina
- Height: 1.89 m (6 ft 2 in)
- Position: Midfielder

Youth career
- Mladost Gacko

Senior career*
| Years | Team | Apps | (Gls) |
| –2008 | Velež Mostar | | |
| 2009–2010 | Tatran Prešov | 14 | (0) |
| 2010–2011 | Sloboda Tuzla | 13 | (0) |
| 2011 | Željezničar Sarajevo | 2 | (0) |
| 2011–2012 | Sutjeska Foča | | |

International career
| 2009 | Bosnia and Herzegovina U21 | 1 | (0) |
- * Club domestic league appearances and goals

Dejan Drakul (23 May 1988 – 27 May 2014) was a Bosnian-Herzegovinian professional footballer who played as a midfielder.

== Club career ==
In February 2009, Drakul signed a three-year contract with Slovak club 1. FC Tatran Prešov. In summer 2010 he returned to Bosnia and for the following two seasons he played with Sloboda Tuzla and Željezničar Sarajevo in the Bosnian Premier League.

== International career ==
At international level, Drakul played for Bosnia and Herzegovina U21 national team.

== Death ==
Drakul died on 27 May 2014, in Bijeljina hospital after a long illness.
