= Nebojša Šodić =

Bosnian footballer

Personal information
- Full name: Nebojša Šodić
- Date of birth: 15 July 1985 (age 41)
- Place of birth: Prijedor, SFR Yugoslavia
- Position: Right back

Senior career*
Years	Team	Apps	(Gls)
2003–2006	Rudar Prijedor		
2006	Borac Banja Luka	14	(0)
2007–2008	Hajduk Kula	15	(0)
2008	→ Mladost Apatin (loan)	13	(0)
2008–2012	Rudar Prijedor	69	(0)
2013	Zvijezda Gradačac	8	(0)
2013–2014	Radnik Bijeljina	8	(0)
2014–2016	Rudar Prijedor	21	(0)
2016–2018	Sloga 94		
- * Club domestic league appearances and goals as of 13 June 2015

Nebojša Šodić (Serbian Cyrillic: Небојша Шодић; born 15 July 1985) is a Bosnian retired football defender who finished his playing career as player-coach at Sloga 94 Bijeljina.

== Club career ==
He was born in Prijedor, SR Bosnia and Herzegovina, SFR Yugoslavia. After playing in one of the biggest clubs of Bosnia and Herzegovina, FK Borac Banja Luka, he moved, in January 2007, to Serbia to play in the Serbian SuperLiga club FK Hajduk Kula. In January 2008 he was loaned to FK Mladost Apatin that was playing in the Serbian second tier, the Serbian First League. Since summer 2008 he is back to Bosnia, now playing with FK Rudar Prijedor.

In January 2013, Šodić left Rudar for Zvijezda Gradačac.
