= Ratko Dujković =

Bosnian footballer (born 1983)

Personal information
- Date of birth: 16 March 1983 (age 43)
- Place of birth: Doboj, SFR Yugoslavia
- Height: 1.92 m (6 ft 4 in)
- Position: Goalkeeper

Youth career
- Sloga Doboj

Senior career*
Years	Team	Apps	(Gls)
- OFK Kikinda
- Sloboda Tuzla
2006–2013	Slavija Sarajevo	75	(0)
2013−2015	Zrinjski Mostar	59	(0)
2015−2016	Saipa	11	(0)
2016–2017	Olimpic	4	(0)
2017	Čelik Zenica	3	(0)
2017	Rudar Kakanj	10	(0)
2018–2019	Čelik Zenica	12	(0)
- * Club domestic league appearances and goals

Ratko Dujković (born 16 March 1983) is a Bosnian former professional footballer who played as goalkeeper. Dujković was voted the best goalkeeper of the 2014–15 Premier League of Bosnia and Herzegovina season.

== Career ==
Dujković started playing when he was 10 at Sloga Doboj. When he was a student, he was studying Tourism when he signed his first professional contract with Serbian side OFK Kikinda and that was a starting point of his definitive career as professional footballer. Later he played with Bosnian side Sloboda Tuzla before joining Slavija Sarajevo where he spent seven years.

== Honours ==
Zrinjski Mostar

- Premier Liga: 2013–14
