= Banja Ilidža =

Banja Ilidža Banja Terme Ilidža
- Spa resort / spa town
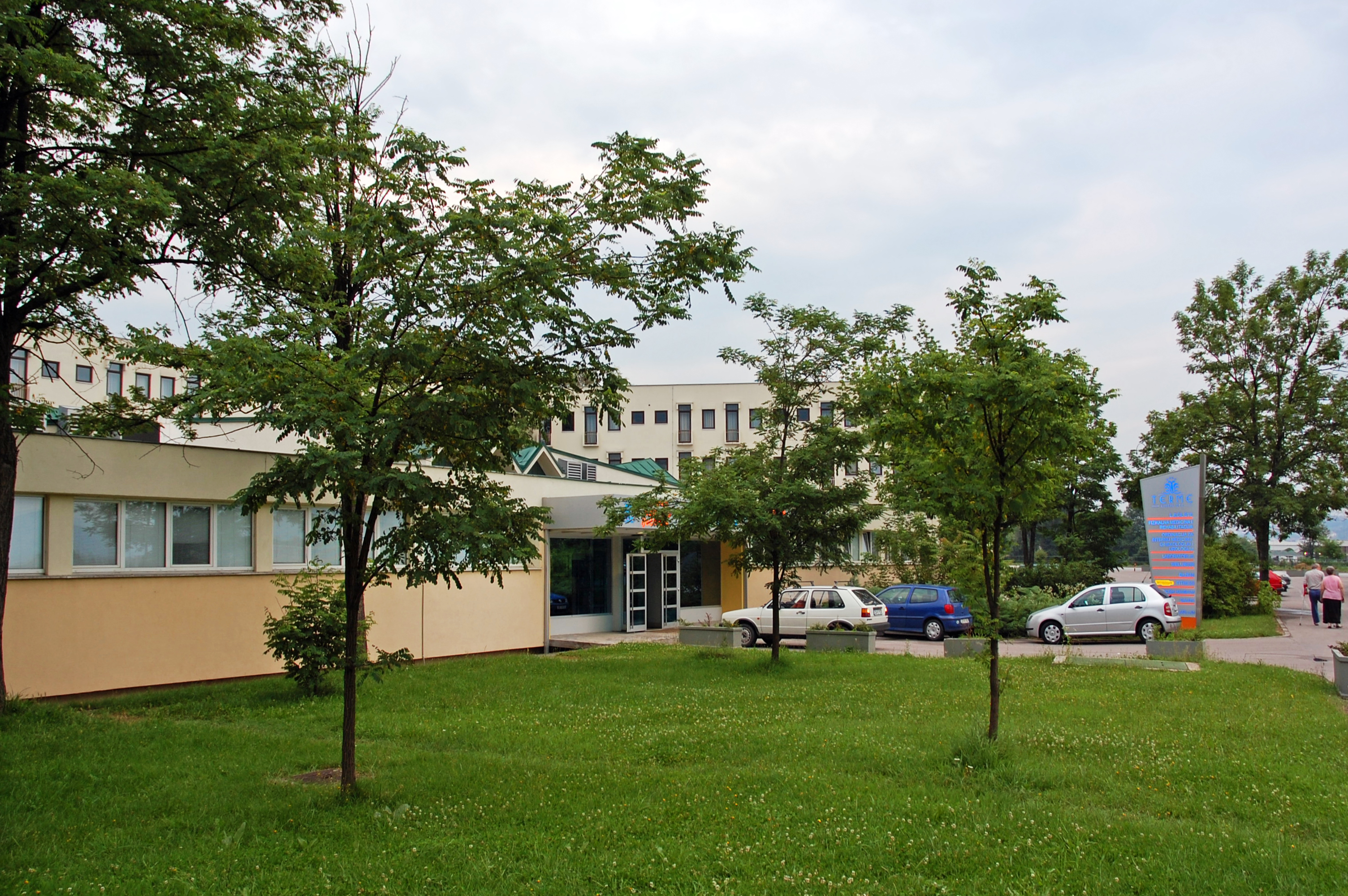
- Banja Terme Ilidža, a modern hotel and main spa in the resort
- Interactive map of Banja Ilidža
- Location within Bosnia and Herzegovina
- Country: Bosnia and Herzegovina
- Canton: Sarajevo
- Town: Ilidža

Dimensions
  - Length: 1 km (0.62 mi)
  - Width: 1 km (0.62 mi)
- Elevation: 500 m (1,600 ft)
- Website: hoteliilidza.ba/bs/banja/

Banja Ilidža or Banja Terme Ilidža spa and a hotel complex is located in Ilidža town and municipality on the outskirts of Sarajevo, capital of Bosnia and Herzegovina.

The town of Ilidža with its historic Roman archaeological site consisting of thermae and the village of Aquae Sulphurae, the 19th century hotel complex from Austro-Hungarian period, and a modern bath and a spa resort hotel, Banja Terme Ilidža, is a spa town. This, along with a rich natural heritage, makes tourism the most important parts of Ilidža's economy. The natural environment of the area is used to the town's advantage, attracting tourists from both abroad and as near as neighboring Sarajevo.

There are plans for future development to enhance tourism, including a cable car line to connect Ilidža and Vrelo Bosne protected Nature Monument with the mountains of Igman and Bjelašnica as a destinations for skiing and hiking. Vrelo Bosne is one of the country's most popular protected areas. The Rimski Most ("Roman Bridge") over the Bosna river was built in the 16th century using actual stones Roman used for built a previous bridge and other buildings.

Ilidža is marketed to Arab tourists, with many services advertised in Arabic.

On a typical year more than 60,000 tourists visit the park.

The spa complex is connected with a spring of the Bosna via 3 kilometre long avenue Velika Aleja (transl. Grand Avenue) leading from the hotel complex and a spa at the northeastern end toward the springs at the far southwestern end. There is also Mala Aleja (transl. Little Alley) which branches off towards Stojčevac and the spring complex there to the southeast. The paths and roads inside the park are ideal for walks and bicycle riding

Spa central buildings complex built in Austro-Hungarian period and contemporary architecture style (1867–1918)

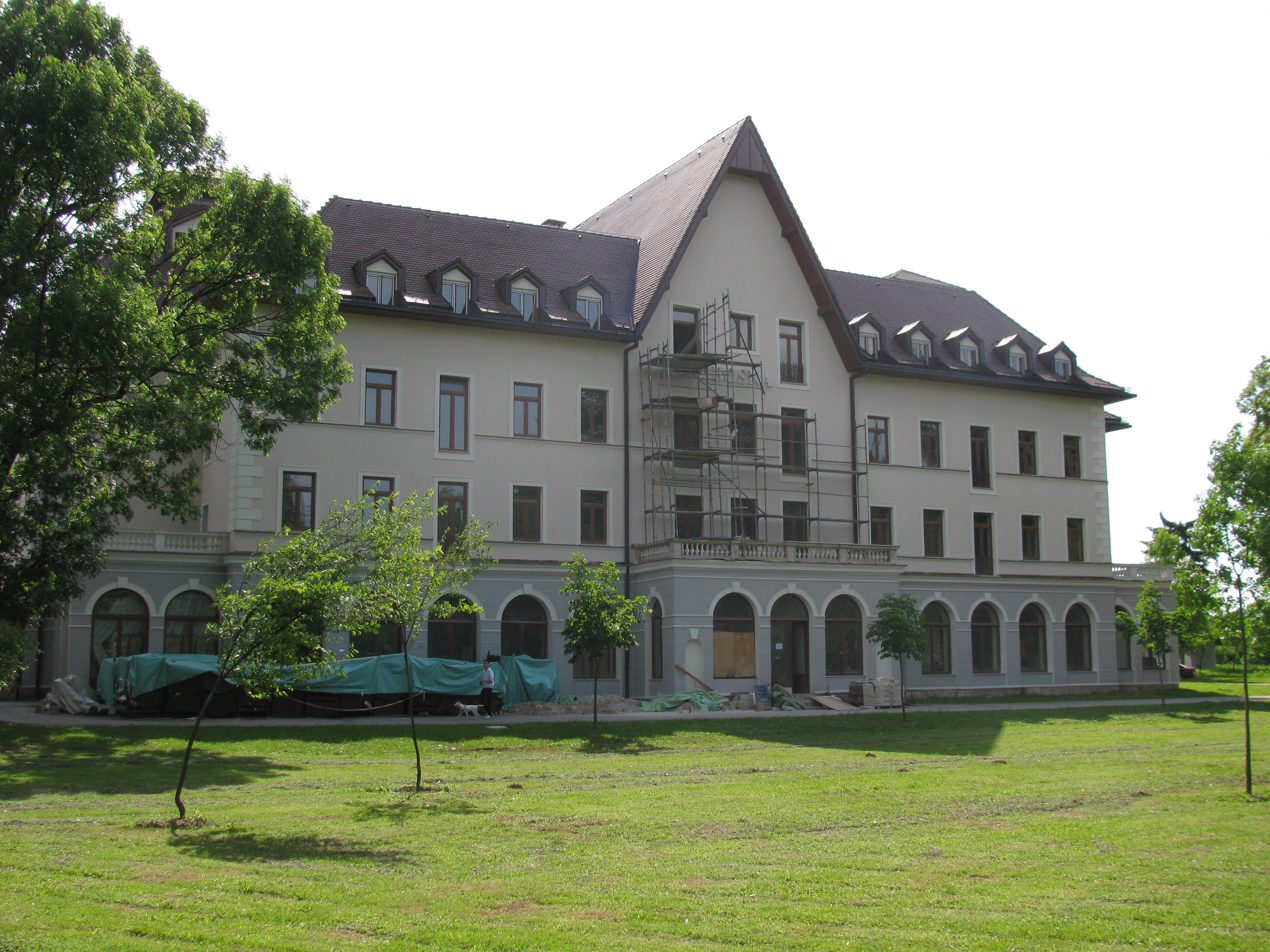
Hotel Bosna

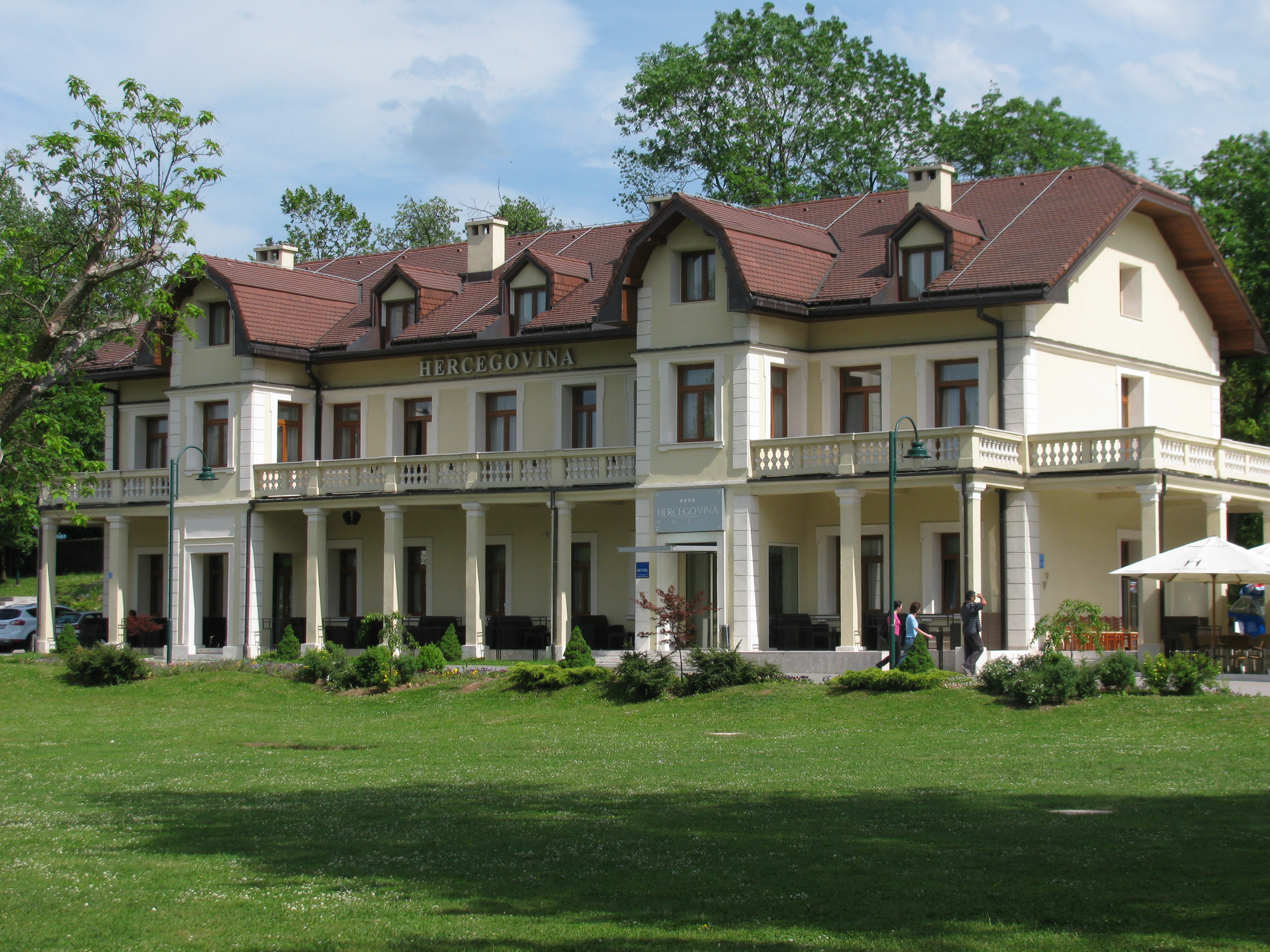
Hotel Hercegovina

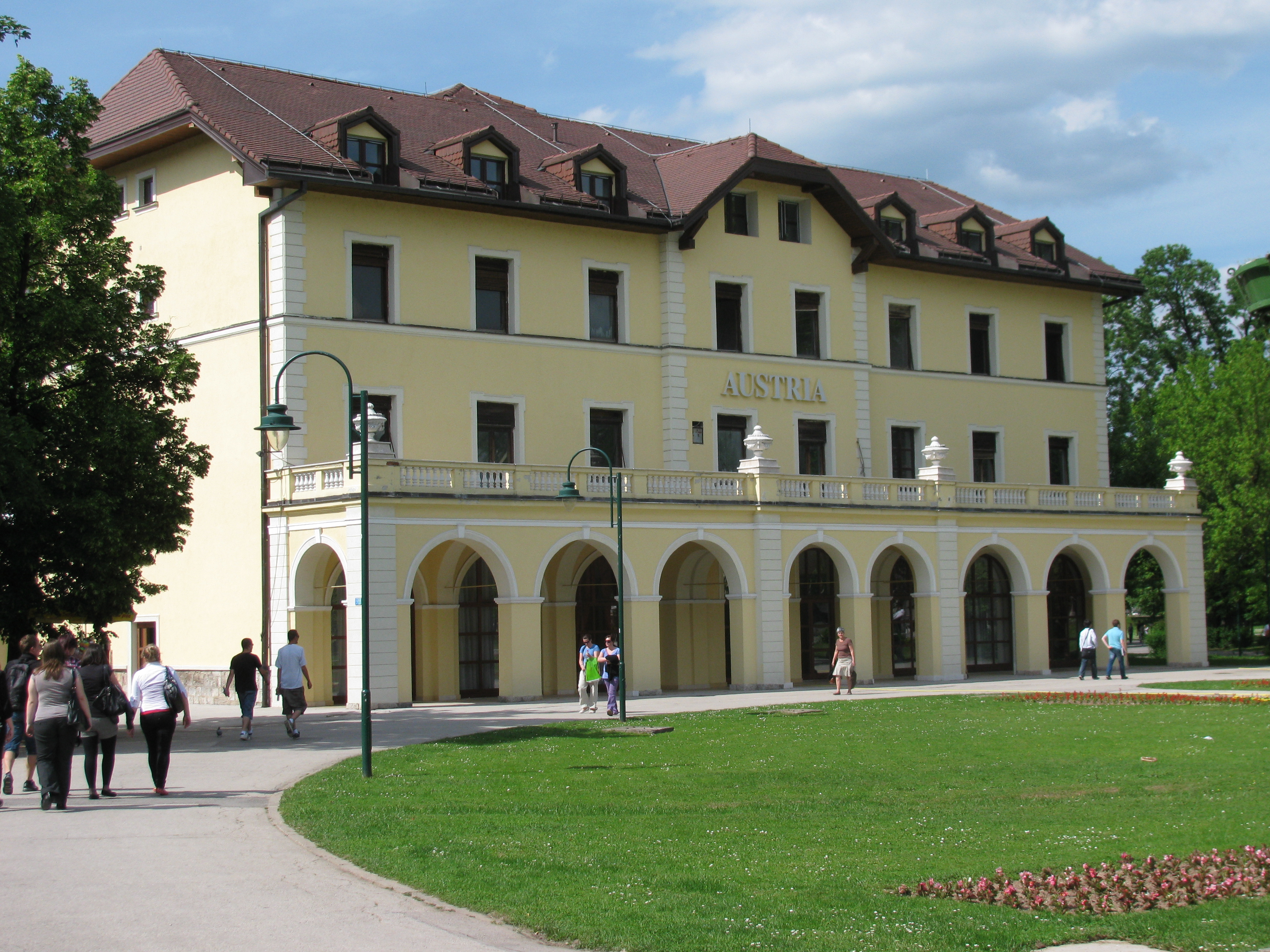
Hotel Austria

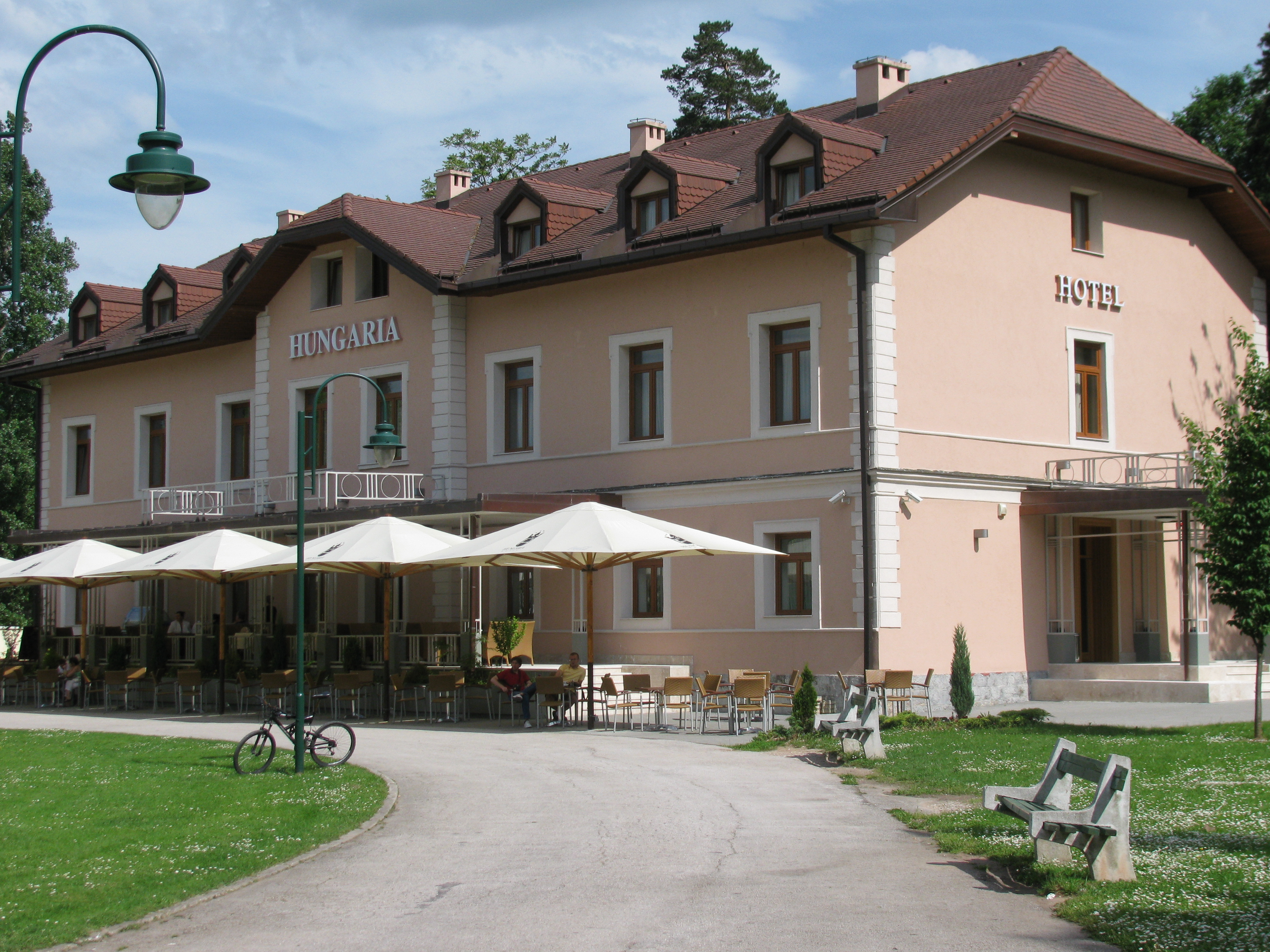
Hotel Crystal (previously called Hotel Hungaria)
