= Bojan Tadić =

Bosnian footballer (born 1981)

Personal information
- Full name: Bojan Tadić
- Date of birth: 2 March 1981 (age 45)
- Place of birth: Banja Luka, SR Bosnia and Herzegovina, SFR Yugoslavia
- Height: 1.84 m (6 ft 1/2 in)
- Position: Midfielder

Youth career
- 1993–1995: Naprijed Banja Luka
- 1995–1998: BSK Banja Luka

Senior career*
Years	Team	Apps	(Gls)
1998–2000	BSK Banja Luka		
2000–2002	OFK Beograd	1	(0)
2002–2004	NK Zagreb	1	(0)
2004	Borac Banja Luka	12	(2)
2005	Herfølge BK	5	(0)
2005–2007	Borac Banja Luka	30	(1)
2007–2008	Kozara Gradiška	0	(0)
2008–2010	Petrochimi Tabriz		
2012–2013	Sloboda Mrkonjić Grad	12	(0)
2013–2015	Sutjeska Foča	0	(0)
2015–2016	Sloboda Novi Grad		
- * Club domestic league appearances and goals

Bojan Tadić (Serbian Cyrillic: Бојан Taдић, born March 2, 1981) is a Bosnian retired footballer who last played for Sloboda Novi Grad

== Club career ==
Born in Banja Luka, SR Bosnia and Herzegovina to a Serb father and a Croat mother, he previously played for FK BSK Banja Luka, OFK Beograd in the First League of FR Yugoslavia, then with NK Zagreb in the Prva HNL, Herfølge Boldklub in the Danish Superliga, FK Borac Banja Luka in the Premier League of Bosnia and Herzegovina, FK Kozara Gradiška in the First League of the Republika Srpska and Petrochimi Tabriz F.C. in Iran.

== Honours ==
NK Zagreb

- Prva HNL: 2001-02
