= Miroslav Rikanović =

Serbian footballer

Personal information
- Full name: Miroslav Rikanović
- Date of birth: 20 January 1983 (age 43)
- Place of birth: Zrenjanin, SFR Yugoslavia
- Height: 1.90 m (6 ft 3 in)
- Position: Forward

Team information
- Current team: SV Axams
- Number: 30

Youth career
- Mladost Lukićevo

Senior career*
Years	Team	Apps	(Gls)
2001–2002	Mladost Lukićevo	17	(4)
2003–2004	Mladost Apatin	12	(0)
2004	→ ČSK Čelarevo (loan)	9	(0)
2004	Big Bull Bačinci	12	(5)
2005–2006	Jedinstvo Ub	48	(8)
2006	Cement Beočin	15	(7)
2007	Zorya Luhansk	8	(1)
2007–2008	Sloga Kraljevo	18	(4)
2008–2009	Borac Banja Luka	35	(18)
2010	Proleter Novi Sad	2	(0)
2010	Radnički Sombor	13	(3)
2011	Elbasani	4	(0)
2011–2012	Sloga Doboj	11	(0)
2012–2013	Radnik Bijeljina	8	(0)
2013–2014	Banat Zrenjanin	25	(8)
2015	SV Reutte	15	(8)
2015–2020	SPG Mötz/Silz	112	(56)
2020–2024	FC Oberhofen	13	(1)
2024-	SV Axams	1	(0)

Managerial career
- 2019: SPG Mötz/Silz (player/manager)
- 2021-2023: FC Oberhofen (player/manager)
- 2023-: SPG Axams/Grinzens
- * Club domestic league appearances and goals as of 24 May 2025

Miroslav Rikanović (Serbian Cyrillic: Мирослав Рикановић; born 20 January 1983) is a Serbian football forward who plays for FC Oberhofen in Austria.

== Career ==
He played with many clubs in Serbia, and Bosnia and Herzegovina. He also played with Ukrainian club Zorya Luhansk, and he made 4 appearances in Albanian Superliga, playing for Elbasani.
