= Matijas Pejić =

Bosnia and Herzegovinian footballer

Personal information
- Date of birth: 18 May 1988 (age 38)
- Place of birth: Orašje, SFR Yugoslavia
- Height: 1.82 m (5 ft 11 1/2 in)
- Position: Defender

Team information
- Current team: HNKM Domaljevac

Senior career*
Years	Team	Apps	(Gls)
2005–2009	Orašje	58	(3)
2009–2011	Zbrojovka Brno	4	(0)
2012	Sloboda Tuzla	15	(1)
2013–2015	Velež Mostar	37	(0)
2015-2016	Zvijezda Gradačac	29	(1)
2016	Orašje	13	(1)
2017	Travnik	12	(0)
2017–2018	Orašje	21	(0)
2018–2020	HNKM Domaljevac		

International career
2008	Bosnia and Herzegovina	1	(0)
- * Club domestic league appearances and goals as of 30 June 2011

Matijas Pejić (born 18 May 1988 in Orašje) is a Bosnian-Herzegovinian professional footballer, who currently plays for HNK Mladost Domaljevac.

== Club career ==
After spells at several clubs in Bosnia Herzegovina, Pejić left hometown club Orašje for lower league side HNKM Domaljevac in 2018.

== International career ==
He made his debut for Bosnia and Herzegovina in a March 2008 friendly match against Macedonia, coming on as a late substitute for Zvjezdan Misimović. It remained his sole international appearance.
