= Nedžad Bajrović =

Bosnian footballer

Personal information
- Full name: Nedžad Bajrović
- Date of birth: 4 July 1970 (age 56)
- Place of birth: Gusinje, SFR Yugoslavia
- Height: 1.83 m (6 ft 0 in)
- Position: Defender

Senior career*
Years	Team	Apps	(Gls)
1994–2006	Sloboda Tuzla	108+	(5+)
2007	Al-Merrikh		

International career^{‡}
1997-2000	Bosnia and Herzegovina	4	(0)

Managerial career
- 2012-2014: Gradina
- 2019: Bosna Mionica
- 2020: Gradina (women)
- * Club domestic league appearances and goals ‡ National team caps and goals as of 12 June 2021

Nedžad Bajrović (born 4 July 1970 in Gusinje, Montenegro) is a Bosnian retired football player.

== Playing career ==
=== Club ===
He formed a central defensive duo with Samir Kuduzović at Sloboda Tuzla for several years and they met again in 2019 when they were both managing lower league sides.

=== International ===
Bajrović made his debut for Bosnia and Herzegovina in a November 1997 friendly match away against Tunisia and has earned a total of 4 caps, scoring no goals. His final international was a March 2000 friendly against Jordan.

== Managerial career ==
In September 2012, he succeeded Boris Gavran, who had only been at the helm for a few days, as temporary coach of Gradina. He was appointed manager of third tier Bosna Mionica in July 2019. He was coach of Gradina's women's team in 2020.
