= List of Bosnia and Herzegovina football transfers summer 2012 =

This is a list of transfers in Bosnian football for the 2012 summer transfer window. Only moves featuring a Premier League of Bosnia and Herzegovina, First League of the Republika Srpska and First League of the Federation of Bosnia and Herzegovina side are listed.

== Premier League of Bosnia and Herzegovina ==
=== Borac Banja Luka ===
In: Note: Flags indicate national team as defined under FIFA eligibility rules; some limited exceptions apply. Players may hold more than one non-FIFA nationality.

| No. | Pos. | Nation | Player |
|---|---|---|---|
| 1 | GK | BIH | Asmir Avdukić (loan return from (Iran) Persepolis) |
| 2 | DF | BIH | Vukašin Trivunović (from (Kazakhstan) Zhetysu) |
| 3 | DF | BIH | Nikola Vasiljević (from (Serbia) Srem S.Mitrovica) |
| 4 | MF | BIH | Aleksandar Radulović (from Crvena Zemlja) |
| 5 | DF | BIH | Alen Bašić (from (Iran) Malavan) |
| 7 | MF | BIH | Dalibor Teinović (from (Slovenia) Domžale) |
| 9 | FW | SUI | Slaviša Dugić (from (Cyprus) APEP) |
| 14 | MF | BIH | Jovica Stokić (from (Serbia) BSK Borča) |
| 15 | DF | SRB | Marko Milić (from (Serbia) OFK Beograd) |
| 16 | MF | BIH | Stefan Dujaković (loan return from Sloboda Mrkonjić Grad) |
| 18 | MF | SRB | Marko Živković (from (Montenegro) Dečić Tuzi) |
| 20 | MF | BIH | Vedran Kantar (from Rudar Prijedor) |
| 25 | GK | BIH | Dalibor Kozić (from Kozara Gradiška) |

Out: Note: Flags indicate national team as defined under FIFA eligibility rules; some limited exceptions apply. Players may hold more than one non-FIFA nationality.

| No. | Pos. | Nation | Player |
|---|---|---|---|
| 3 | MF | SRB | Saša Krajnović (released) |
| 4 | MF | BIH | Perica Ivetić (to Olimpic) |
| 5 | DF | BIH | Bojan Marković (to (Israel) Hapoel Beer Sheva) |
| 7 | DF | BIH | Leonid Ćorić (released) |
| 9 | FW | BIH | Saša Kajkut (released) |
| 10 | FW | BIH | Nemanja Bilbija (loan return to (Serbia) Vojvodina) |
| 15 | MF | BIH | Marko Maksimović (released) |
| 15 | DF | SRB | Marko Milić (to (Serbia) Bežanija) |
| 16 | FW | BIH | Bojan Macanović (released) |
| 18 | MF | SRB | Marko Živković (released) |
| 25 | GK | BIH | Mladen Lučić (on loan to Radnik Bijeljina) |
| 27 | FW | BIH | Duško Stajić (to (Serbia) Sloboda Užice) |
| 29 | DF | BIH | Dragoslav Stakić (to (Slovenia) Rudar Velenje) |

=== Čelik ===
In: Note: Flags indicate national team as defined under FIFA eligibility rules; some limited exceptions apply. Players may hold more than one non-FIFA nationality.

| No. | Pos. | Nation | Player |
|---|---|---|---|
| 3 | DF | BIH | Vladimir Marković (from (Hungary) Pécsi) |
| 5 | DF | SRB | Stefan Maletić (from Kozara) |
| 7 | DF | BIH | Elmir Kuduzović (from (Montenegro) Čelik Nikšić) |
| 8 | MF | BIH | Semir Bajraktarević (from Sarajevo) |
| 10 | FW | BIH | Jasmin Mešanović (from Sloboda) |
| 11 | FW | BIH | Saša Kajkut (free) |
| 18 | MF | BIH | Alen Dedić (from (Croatia) Rijeka) |
| 19 | MF | CRO | Stipe Barać (from (Croatia) Dugopolje) |
| 20 | FW | SVN | Dejan Božičić (from (Slovenia) Šenčur) |
| 21 | MF | SRB | Marko Nestorović (from (North Macedonia) Sileks) |
| 22 | FW | BIH | Meksud Čolić (from (Germany) SSV Reutlingen) |

Out: Note: Flags indicate national team as defined under FIFA eligibility rules; some limited exceptions apply. Players may hold more than one non-FIFA nationality.

| No. | Pos. | Nation | Player |
|---|---|---|---|
| 1 | GK | SRB | Mile Matić (released) |
| 3 | DF | BIH | Dario Damjanović (to (Serbia) Novi Pazar) |
| 5 | MF | BIH | Dejan Martinović (to (Kazakhstan) Okzhetpes) |
| 8 | MF | BIH | Dario Purić (to (Serbia) Sloboda Užice) |
| 10 | MF | BIH | Aldin Šišić (to Sloboda) |
| 18 | MF | BIH | Aladin Isaković (to (Germany) SV Heimstetten) |
| 19 | MF | BIH | Haris Dilaver (released) |
| 20 | DF | BIH | Kenan Stupar (released) |
| 21 | DF | BIH | Elvis Sadiković (released) |
| 22 | MF | BIH | Armin Kapetan (to Radnik) |
| 24 | MF | BIH | Haris Hećo (released) |
| — | DF | BIH | Avdija Vršajević (to (Croatia) Hajduk Split) |

=== GOŠK ===
In: Note: Flags indicate national team as defined under FIFA eligibility rules; some limited exceptions apply. Players may hold more than one non-FIFA nationality.

| No. | Pos. | Nation | Player |
|---|---|---|---|
| 6 | MF | BIH | Ivan Kvesić (on loan from Široki Brijeg) |
| 7 | MF | BIH | Sinan Ramović (from Goražde) |
| 11 | MF | BIH | Elvis Bibić (from Zrinjski) |
| 16 | DF | CRO | Marin Božić (on loan from Široki Brijeg) |
| 17 | DF | CRO | Ivan Perić (from Zrinjski) |
| 18 | FW | BIH | Sabahudin Jusufbašić (from Čapljina) |
| 19 | MF | BIH | Stjepan Badrov (from Vitez) |
| 20 | MF | CRO | Andrija Milinković (from Neretva Metkovići) |
| 21 | MF | BIH | Almir Bekić (on loan from (Croatia) Dinamo Zagreb) |
| 22 | MF | CRO | Matej Karačić (on loan from Široki Brijeg) |
| — | GK | BIH | Boris Bačak (on loan from Široki Brijeg) |
| — | DF | BIH | Ivan Kukavica (on loan from Široki Brijeg) |

Out: Note: Flags indicate national team as defined under FIFA eligibility rules; some limited exceptions apply. Players may hold more than one non-FIFA nationality.

| No. | Pos. | Nation | Player |
|---|---|---|---|
| 1 | GK | CRO | Nikola Schreng (released) |
| 5 | MF | KOR | Park Chan-Jong (released) |
| 6 | DF | CRO | Ivan Raič (Čapljina) |
| 13 | DF | CRO | Ante Zurak (released) |
| 14 | MF | BIH | Danijel Ćulum (to Radnik) |
| 20 | FW | CRO | Ivan Raguž (to Neretva Metkovići) |
| 22 | MF | CRO | Pero Menalo (released) |
| 26 | MF | KSA | Ibrahim Al-Ibrahim (to (Croatia) Inter Zaprešić) |
| — | DF | CRO | Robert Grbavac (to Zrinjski) |
| — | MF | CRO | Tomislav Tomić (loan return to Široki Brijeg) |
| — | MF | BIH | Damir Zlomislić (loan return to Široki Brijeg) |
| — | MF | BRA | Diogo (loan return to Široki Brijeg) |
| — | FW | BIH | Sanid Mujakić (to (Czech Republic) Banik Most) |
| — | FW | BIH | Mahir Karić (to Olimpic) |
| — | FW | BIH | Mirza Džafić (to Zvijezda Gradačac) |

=== Gradina ===
In: Note: Flags indicate national team as defined under FIFA eligibility rules; some limited exceptions apply. Players may hold more than one non-FIFA nationality.

| No. | Pos. | Nation | Player |
|---|---|---|---|
| — | GK | BIH | Kenan Pirić (from Sloboda Tuzla) |
| — | DF | BIH | Nikola Mikelini (free) |
| — | DF | BIH | Dražen Savić (from Austria Klagenfurt) |
| — | MF | BIH | Muamer Zoletić (from Sloboda Tuzla) |
| — | MF | BIH | Amer Ordagić (from Gradina U19) |
| — | MF | BIH | Emir Selimović (from Sloboda Tuzla) |
| — | MF | BIH | Edin Husić (from Sarajevo) |
| — | MF | BIH | Amir Hamzić (from Zvijezda Gradačac) |
| — | MF | BIH | Nermin Varupa (from Travnik) |
| — | MF | BIH | Amer Jugo (from Velež) |
| — | MF | BIH | Kristijan Ivešić (from Zrinjski) |
| — | FW | BIH | Damir Tosunović (from Rudar Prijedor) |
| — | FW | BIH | Adin Džafić (free) |

Out: Note: Flags indicate national team as defined under FIFA eligibility rules; some limited exceptions apply. Players may hold more than one non-FIFA nationality.

| No. | Pos. | Nation | Player |
|---|---|---|---|
| — | DF | BIH | Sanel Alić (released) |
| — | DF | BIH | Ermin Džananović (released) |
| — | DF | BIH | Darko Mitrović (to Sutjeska) |
| — | MF | BIH | Kenan Turudija (released) |

=== Leotar ===
In: Note: Flags indicate national team as defined under FIFA eligibility rules; some limited exceptions apply. Players may hold more than one non-FIFA nationality.

| No. | Pos. | Nation | Player |
|---|---|---|---|
| — | DF | BIH | Aleksandar Vasiljević (from (Serbia) Hajduk Kula) |
| — | DF | BIH | Mirko Koprivica (from Leotar U19) |
| — | DF | SRB | Dejan Ponjević (from Modriča) |
| — | DF | SRB | Borko Novaković (from (Serbia) Spartak ZV) |
| — | MF | SRB | Njegoš Goločevac (from (Serbia) Hajduk Kula) |
| — | MF | BIH | Bojan Đorđić (was on loan Sloga Doboj) |
| — | MF | SRB | Jovan Radivojević (from (Serbia) Borac Čačak) |
| — | MF | SRB | Dejan Janković (from (Serbia) Radnički Obrenovac) |
| — | MF | SRB | Ivan Marinković (from (Serbia) Radnik Surdulica) |
| — | MF | BIH | Ljubiša Pecelj (from Leotar U19) |
| — | MF | SRB | Marko Mančić (from (Serbia) Radnički Niš) |
| — | FW | SRB | Borivoje Filipović (from (Serbia) RFK Novi Sad) |
| — | FW | BIH | Boban Đerić (from (Serbia) FK Inđija) |

Out: Note: Flags indicate national team as defined under FIFA eligibility rules; some limited exceptions apply. Players may hold more than one non-FIFA nationality.

| No. | Pos. | Nation | Player |
|---|---|---|---|
| — | GK | BIH | Novica Berek (released) |
| — | DF | SRB | Nenad Nastić (released) |
| — | DF | SRB | Darko Drec (released) |
| — | DF | BIH | Miljan Milanović (released) |
| — | DF | AUS | Milan Zorić (released) |
| — | DF | BIH | Semjon Milošević (released) |
| — | DF | BIH | Bojan Vučinić (released) |
| — | DF | BIH | Gavrilo Ćorolija (released) |
| — | MF | SRB | Igor Aničić (to Zrinjski) |
| — | MF | BIH | Aleksandar Bajat (to Rudar Prijedor) |
| — | MF | SRB | Ognjen Lekić (to (Serbia) Mačva Šabac) |
| — | MF | BIH | Slobodan Kokić (released) |
| — | MF | BRA | Jair Souto (released) |
| — | MF | BIH | Rade Bošković (released) |
| — | MF | GHA | Akuffo Gershon Kwasi (released) |
| — | FW | BIH | Dragan Ristić (to Radnik) |
| — | FW | MKD | Aleksandar Stojanovski (to (North Macedonia) Euromilk) |
| — | FW | SRB | Dragan Vuković (to (Serbia) Jedinstvo Užice) |

=== Olimpic ===
In: Note: Flags indicate national team as defined under FIFA eligibility rules; some limited exceptions apply. Players may hold more than one non-FIFA nationality.

| No. | Pos. | Nation | Player |
|---|---|---|---|
| 13 | MF | BIH | Perica Ivetić (from Borac Banja Luka) |
| 14 | MF | BIH | Ognjen Đelmić (from Zvijezda Gradačac) |
| 19 | MF | BIH | Mahir Karić (from GOŠK) |
| — | MF | SRB | Bratislav Ristić (free) |
| — | FW | BIH | Alen Škoro (from Austria Klagenfurt) |

Out: Note: Flags indicate national team as defined under FIFA eligibility rules; some limited exceptions apply. Players may hold more than one non-FIFA nationality.

| No. | Pos. | Nation | Player |
|---|---|---|---|
| — | MF | BIH | Haris Harba (to (Czech Republic) Hradec Králové) |
| — | MF | BIH | Adis Hadžanović (released) |

=== Radnik ===
In: Note: Flags indicate national team as defined under FIFA eligibility rules; some limited exceptions apply. Players may hold more than one non-FIFA nationality.

| No. | Pos. | Nation | Player |
|---|---|---|---|
| — | GK | BIH | Mladen Lučić (on loan from Borac Banja Luka) |
| — | DF | BIH | Marko Jevtić (from Rudar Prijedor) |
| — | DF | SRB | Mladen Zeljković (from (Serbia) ČSK Pivara) |
| — | DF | SRB | Stevan Jovanović (from Rudar Prijedor) |
| — | MF | BIH | Armin Kapetan (from Čelik) |
| — | MF | BIH | Danijel Ćulum (from GOŠK) |
| — | MF | SRB | Marko Basara (from Kozara) |
| — | FW | BIH | Zoran Nikić (from Podrinje) |
| — | FW | BIH | Dragan Ristić (from Leotar) |

Out: Note: Flags indicate national team as defined under FIFA eligibility rules; some limited exceptions apply. Players may hold more than one non-FIFA nationality.

| No. | Pos. | Nation | Player |
|---|---|---|---|
| — | DF | SRB | Goran Habensus (released) |
| — | MF | BIH | Dušan Sredojević (to Drina Zvornik) |
| — | MF | SRB | Milan Đurić (loan return to (Serbia) Jagodina) |
| — | FW | BIH | Zlatko Đorić (to Sloga Doboj) |
| — | FW | SRB | Nebojša Vukojčić (released) |
| — | FW | BIH | Nemanja Knežević (released) |
| — | FW | BIH | Milandin Andrić (released) |
| — | FW | BIH | Aleksandar Nikolić (loan leturn to Željezničar) |
| — | FW | BIH | Vladan Kujundžić (to Sloga Doboj) |

=== Rudar Prijedor ===
In: Note: Flags indicate national team as defined under FIFA eligibility rules; some limited exceptions apply. Players may hold more than one non-FIFA nationality.

| No. | Pos. | Nation | Player |
|---|---|---|---|
| — | GK | SRB | Danijel Milanović (from (Serbia) Sloga Despotovac) |
| — | GK | BIH | Boriša Bodiroga (from Rudar Ugljevik) |
| — | DF | BIH | Miodrag Gigović (from Kozara) |
| — | DF | DOM | Edward Acevedo Cruz (from Modriča) |
| — | DF | BIH | Borislav Topić (from (Romania) Târgu Mureș) |
| — | MF | BIH | Aleksandar Bajat (from Leotar) |
| — | MF | CRO | Tomislav Puljić (from Brotnjo Čitluk) |
| — | MF | BIH | Duško Sakan (on loan from (Serbia) Rad Beograd) |
| — | MF | CRO | Denis Bajalica (from (Croatia) Knin) |
| — | MF | BIH | Nemanja Kokanović (from Sloga Doboj) |
| — | FW | BIH | Vladimir Karalić (from Iskra Bugojno) |
| — | FW | BIH | Duško Vranešević (from (Slovenia) Nafta Lendava) |
| — | FW | BIH | Haris Handžić (from Velež) |
| — | FW | SRB | Veljko Vuković (from (Serbia) Mačva Šabac) |
| — | FW | GEO | Apollon Lemondzhava (free) |

Out: Note: Flags indicate national team as defined under FIFA eligibility rules; some limited exceptions apply. Players may hold more than one non-FIFA nationality.

| No. | Pos. | Nation | Player |
|---|---|---|---|
| 4 | MF | BIH | Adis Stambolija (released) |
| 5 | DF | BIH | Marko Jevtić (to Radnik) |
| 8 | MF | BIH | Nedžad Žerić (End of career) |
| 9 | FW | BIH | Damir Tosunović (to Gradina) |
| 10 | MF | CRO | Luka Kujundžija (to (Austria) ASKÖ Stinatz) |
| 11 | MF | BIH | Vedran Kantar (to Borac Banja Luka) |
| 19 | MF | BIH | Mahir Karić (released) |
| — | DF | BIH | Nemanja Vejinović (to Sloboda Novi Grad) |
| — | DF | SRB | Stevan Jovanović (to Radnik) |

=== Sarajevo ===
In: Note: Flags indicate national team as defined under FIFA eligibility rules; some limited exceptions apply. Players may hold more than one non-FIFA nationality.

| No. | Pos. | Nation | Player |
|---|---|---|---|
| 20 | FW | SVN | Samir Nuhanović (from Zvijezda Gradačac) |
| 11 | FW | BIH | Emir Hadžić (from (Hungary) Budapest Honvéd) |
| 12 | GK | BIH | Almin Adbihodžić (from Krajina Cazin) |
| 16 | MF | SRB | Radan Šunjevarić (from (Serbia) Novi Pazar) |
| 17 | MF | BIH | Boris Gujić (from (Hungary) Kaposvári Rákóczi) |
| 21 | FW | SRB | Žarko Karamatić (from Slavija) |
| 28 | DF | CRO | Mario Tadejević (from (Croatia) Rijeka) |
| 77 | MF | SRB | Nemanja Zlatković (from (Czech Republic) Zlin) |

Out: Note: Flags indicate national team as defined under FIFA eligibility rules; some limited exceptions apply. Players may hold more than one non-FIFA nationality.

| No. | Pos. | Nation | Player |
|---|---|---|---|
| 9 | FW | BIH | Emir Obuća (released) |
| 13 | MF | SRB | Vučina Šćepanović (to Zrinjski) |
| 18 | FW | BIH | Nermin Haskić (to (Serbia) Voždovac) |
| 34 | GK | BIH | Adi Adilović (to (Greece) Panthrakikos Komotini) |
| 80 | GK | SRB | Đorđe Pantić (released) |
| 3 | DF | BIH | Sanel Trebinjac (released) |
| 4 | DF | BIH | Dilaver Zrnanović (released) |
| 77 | MF | CRO | Matija Matko (to (Croatia) Inter Zaprešić) |
| 8 | MF | BIH | Semir Bajraktarević (to Čelik) |
| 20 | MF | BIH | Edin Husić (to Gradina) |
| 88 | MF | BIH | Kenan Handžić (to (Croatia) Zagreb) |

=== Široki Brijeg ===
In: Note: Flags indicate national team as defined under FIFA eligibility rules; some limited exceptions apply. Players may hold more than one non-FIFA nationality.

| No. | Pos. | Nation | Player |
|---|---|---|---|
| 9 | MF | BIH | Ricardo Baiano |
| 11 | FW | BIH | Krešimir Kordić (from (Slovakia) Slovan Bratislava, was on loan from (Slovakia) Dunajská Streda) |
| 14 | MF | BIH | Davor Landeka (from (Switzerland) Grasshopper) |
| 21 | MF | BIH | Damir Zlomislić (loan return from GOŠK) |
| 22 | MF | SVN | Sandro Bloudek (from (Netherlands) Fortuna Sittard) |
| 24 | FW | CRO | Ivan Barišić (from Široki Brijeg U19) |
| 25 | DF | CRO | Stipo Marković (from Široki Brijeg U19) |
| — | MF | CRO | Zvonimir Kožulj (from Široki Brijeg U19) |

Out: Note: Flags indicate national team as defined under FIFA eligibility rules; some limited exceptions apply. Players may hold more than one non-FIFA nationality.

| No. | Pos. | Nation | Player |
|---|---|---|---|
| 2 | MF | BRA | Marciano (released) |
| 13 | MF | BRA | Diogo (released, was on loan to GOŠK) |
| 14 | FW | ARG | Juan Manuel Varea (released) |
| 18 | MF | BIH | Goran Zakarić (loan return to (Croatia) Dinamo Zagreb) |
| — | GK | CRO | Boris Bačak (on loan to GOŠK, was on loan to Čapljina) |
| — | DF | BRA | Jefthon (released) |
| — | MF | CRO | Tomislav Tomić (to Željezničar, was on loan to GOŠK) |
| — | MF | CRO | Mario Kvesić (to (Croatia) RNK Split) |
| — | FW | CRO | Hrvoje Misić (released) |
| — | FW | BIH | Ante Pinjuh (to Branitelj Mostar) |

=== Slavija ===
In: Note: Flags indicate national team as defined under FIFA eligibility rules; some limited exceptions apply. Players may hold more than one non-FIFA nationality.

| No. | Pos. | Nation | Player |
|---|---|---|---|
| 4 | DF | BIH | Jovan Svitilica (from Posušje) |
| 8 | MF | BIH | Edin Dudo (from Famos SAŠK Napredak) |
| 10 | FW | BIH | Zoran Kokot (from (Iran) Gol Gohar) |
| 14 | MF | BIH | Arman Idrizović (from Čelik U19) |
| 18 | FW | BIH | Feđa Dudić (from (Serbia) Novi Pazar) |
| — | FW | MNE | Marko Mijatović (from (Serbia) Sloga Kraljevo) |

Out: Note: Flags indicate national team as defined under FIFA eligibility rules; some limited exceptions apply. Players may hold more than one non-FIFA nationality.

| No. | Pos. | Nation | Player |
|---|---|---|---|
| 2 | MF | SRB | Filip Osman (to (Serbia) Smederevo) |
| 13 | FW | SRB | Žarko Karamatić (to Sarajevo) |
| 17 | FW | BIH | Adnan Smajić (to Travnik) |
| 22 | MF | SRB | Željko Kovačević (released) |
| 25 | MF | SRB | Igor Krmar (loan return to (Serbia) Radnički 1923) |
| — | DF | BIH | Džemal Sadiković (released) |
| — | DF | SRB | Predrag Pavlović (released) |
| — | DF | BIH | Jovan Vujanić (loan return to (Serbia) Sloboda Užice) |
| — | MF | BIH | Ognjen Todorović (released) |
| — | MF | BIH | Goran Simić (End of career) |
| — | FW | BIH | Emir Zeba (to (Czech Republic) Dynamo České Budějovice) |

=== Travnik ===
In: Note: Flags indicate national team as defined under FIFA eligibility rules; some limited exceptions apply. Players may hold more than one non-FIFA nationality.

| No. | Pos. | Nation | Player |
|---|---|---|---|
| — | DF | BIH | Senad Tumbaković (from Vitez) |
| — | DF | BIH | Nijaz Fazlić (from Travnik U19) |
| — | MF | CRO | Juro Pejić (from Iskra Bugojno) |
| — | MF | SRB | Jasmin Kolašinac (from (Czech Republic) Vlašim) |
| — | MF | BIH | Eldar Torlak (from Travnik U19) |
| — | FW | BIH | Adnan Smajić (from Slavija) |

Out: Note: Flags indicate national team as defined under FIFA eligibility rules; some limited exceptions apply. Players may hold more than one non-FIFA nationality.

| No. | Pos. | Nation | Player |
|---|---|---|---|
| 1 | GK | CRO | Denis Krklec (released) |
| 8 | FW | CRO | Jurica Jelec (released) |
| 10 | MF | BIH | Anel Čurić (to Velež) |
| 13 | MF | BIH | Haris Redžepi (released) |
| 14 | MF | BIH | Nermin Varupa (to Gradina) |
| 15 | MF | BIH | Emir Oruč (released) |
| 16 | MF | BIH | Adnan Šarić (released) |
| 16 | MF | BIH | Adnan Šarić (released) |
| 20 | FW | BRA | Cassio (to (Switzerland) Thun) |
| 22 | MF | CRO | Ivan Batovanja (released) |
| — | MF | BIH | Dženis Huseinspahić (released) |
| — | MF | BIH | Karlo Stošić (released) |

=== Velež ===
In: Note: Flags indicate national team as defined under FIFA eligibility rules; some limited exceptions apply. Players may hold more than one non-FIFA nationality.

| No. | Pos. | Nation | Player |
|---|---|---|---|
| 6 | DF | BIH | Fadil Marić (from Velež U19) |
| 18 | MF | BIH | Anel Čurić (from Travnik) |
| 21 | MF | BIH | Ajdin Nuhić (from Goražde) |
| 23 | FW | BIH | Marsel Mace (from Višići) |
| — | GK | BIH | Arman Suta (loan return from Lokomotiva) |
| — | DF | BIH | Emrah Ćosić (from Velež U19) |
| — | DF | BIH | Anis Kalajdžić (loan return from Lokomotiva) |
| — | MF | BIH | Dženan Kovačević (loan return from Lokomotiva) |
| — | FW | BIH | Maid Jaganjac (from (Serbia) Inđija) |
| — | FW | BIH | Senad Zuhrić (from Velež U19) |
| — | FW | BIH | Amar Balalić (loan return from Lokomotiva) |

Out: Note: Flags indicate national team as defined under FIFA eligibility rules; some limited exceptions apply. Players may hold more than one non-FIFA nationality.

| No. | Pos. | Nation | Player |
|---|---|---|---|
| — | DF | BIH | Tarik Cerić (to Sloboda Tuzla) |
| — | DF | MNE | Slobodan Lakićević (released) |
| — | DF | BIH | Emrah Ćosić (on loan to Podgrmeč) |
| — | MF | BIH | Edin Pehlić (released) |
| — | MF | BIH | Eldar Hasanović (released) |
| — | FW | BIH | Danijel Brković (to Željezničar) |
| — | FW | BIH | Haris Handžić (to Rudar Prijedor) |

=== Željezničar ===
In: Note: Flags indicate national team as defined under FIFA eligibility rules; some limited exceptions apply. Players may hold more than one non-FIFA nationality.

| No. | Pos. | Nation | Player |
|---|---|---|---|
| 4 | FW | BIH | Danijal Brković (from Velež Mostar) |
| 21 | DF | JPN | Eishun Yoshida (from (United States) Saint Leo University) |
| 25 | MF | CRO | Tomislav Tomić (from Široki Brijeg) |
| 29 | FW | BIH | Šaban Pehilj (loan return from Kozara) |
| 30 | GK | CRO | Marijan Antolović (on loan from (Poland) Legia Warsaw) |

Out: Note: Flags indicate national team as defined under FIFA eligibility rules; some limited exceptions apply. Players may hold more than one non-FIFA nationality.

| No. | Pos. | Nation | Player |
|---|---|---|---|
| 15 | DF | LBR | Patrick Nyema Gerhardt (to (Australia) Melbourne Heart) |
| 28 | MF | MKD | Perica Stančeski (to (Serbia) BSK Borča) |
| — | DF | BIH | Emrah Hasanhodžić (loan to Bosna) |
| — | MF | MNE | Goran Marković (to Zrinjski) |
| — | MF | BIH | Amar Prutina (to Zvijezda Gradačac) |
| — | FW | BIH | Aleksandar Nikolić (to Drina Zvornik, was on loan to Radnik) |
| — | FW | SUI | Omar Baljić (released) |

=== Zrinjski ===
In: Note: Flags indicate national team as defined under FIFA eligibility rules; some limited exceptions apply. Players may hold more than one non-FIFA nationality.

| No. | Pos. | Nation | Player |
|---|---|---|---|
| 4 | DF | MNE | Goran Marković (from Željezničar) |
| 10 | MF | SRB | Igor Aničić (from Leotar) |
| 13 | MF | SRB | Vučina Šćepanović (from Sarajevo) |
| 19 | FW | BIH | Ivan Ferenc (from Zvijezda Gradačac) |

Out: Note: Flags indicate national team as defined under FIFA eligibility rules; some limited exceptions apply. Players may hold more than one non-FIFA nationality.

| No. | Pos. | Nation | Player |
|---|---|---|---|
| 2 | DF | BIH | Velimir Zeko (released) |
| 3 | DF | CRO | Damir Džidić (to Široki Brijeg) |
| 7 | MF | BIH | Kristijan Ivešić (to Gradina) |
| 17 | MF | BIH | Mario Lamešić (released) |
| 18 | FW | COL | Phil Jackson (to Sloboda Tuzla) |
| 25 | DF | SRB | Marko Popović (released) |
| 30 | GK | BIH | Matej Marković (released) |
| — | MF | BIH | Elvis Bibić (to GOŠK) |

=== Zvijezda Gradačac ===
In: Note: Flags indicate national team as defined under FIFA eligibility rules; some limited exceptions apply. Players may hold more than one non-FIFA nationality.

| No. | Pos. | Nation | Player |
|---|---|---|---|
| 11 | FW | CRO | Nenad Eric (from Orašje) |
| — | GK | BIH | Emir Prljača (from Zvijezda Gradačac U19) |
| — | GK | SRB | Nikola Kovačević (from (Serbia) Spartak ZV) |
| — | GK | SRB | Nikola Mirković (on loan from (Serbia) Spartak ZV) |
| — | DF | BIH | Amar Prutina (from Željezničar) |
| — | DF | BIH | Jasmin Bogdanović (from Sloga Doboj) |
| — | DF | SRB | Vojislav Stojanac (from (Serbia) Srem Jakovo) |
| — | MF | BIH | Srđan Savić (from (Czech Republic) Karvina) |
| — | FW | BIH | Ermin Vehabović (from Natron Maglaj) |
| — | FW | BIH | Dejan Kojić (from Kozara) |
| — | FW | BIH | Mirza Džafić (from GOŠK) |

Out: Note: Flags indicate national team as defined under FIFA eligibility rules; some limited exceptions apply. Players may hold more than one non-FIFA nationality.

| No. | Pos. | Nation | Player |
|---|---|---|---|
| 2 | DF | BIH | Muhamed Omić (to Sloboda Tuzla) |
| 4 | DF | BIH | Muamer Nezić (to Sloboda Tuzla) |
| 7 | FW | BIH | Ognjen Đelmić (to Olimpic) |
| 8 | MF | BIH | Senad Husić (to (Israel) Ashdod) |
| 10 | FW | SVN | Samir Nuhanović (to Sarajevo) |
| 11 | FW | BIH | Ivan Ferenc (to Zrinjski) |
| 20 | MF | BIH | Amir Hamzić (to Gradina) |

== First League of the Republika Srpska ==
=== Borac Šamac ===
In: Note: Flags indicate national team as defined under FIFA eligibility rules; some limited exceptions apply. Players may hold more than one non-FIFA nationality.

| No. | Pos. | Nation | Player |
|---|---|---|---|
| — | GK | BIH | Trifun Lukić (free) |
| — | DF | BIH | Ranko Galešić (from Modriča) |
| — | MF | BIH | Aleksandar Ćosović (from Orašje) |
| — | MF | BIH | Bojan Letić (from Kozara) |

Out: Note: Flags indicate national team as defined under FIFA eligibility rules; some limited exceptions apply. Players may hold more than one non-FIFA nationality.

| No. | Pos. | Nation | Player |

=== Drina HE ===
In: Note: Flags indicate national team as defined under FIFA eligibility rules; some limited exceptions apply. Players may hold more than one non-FIFA nationality.

| No. | Pos. | Nation | Player |

Out: Note: Flags indicate national team as defined under FIFA eligibility rules; some limited exceptions apply. Players may hold more than one non-FIFA nationality.

| No. | Pos. | Nation | Player |

=== Drina Zvornik ===
In: Note: Flags indicate national team as defined under FIFA eligibility rules; some limited exceptions apply. Players may hold more than one non-FIFA nationality.

| No. | Pos. | Nation | Player |
|---|---|---|---|
| — | DF | BIH | Aleksandar Kikić (from Čelik) |
| — | MF | BIH | Dušan Sredojević (from Radnik) |
| — | FW | BIH | Aleksandar Nikolić (from Željezničar, was on loan from Radnik) |

Out: Note: Flags indicate national team as defined under FIFA eligibility rules; some limited exceptions apply. Players may hold more than one non-FIFA nationality.

| No. | Pos. | Nation | Player |
|---|---|---|---|
| — | MF | BIH | Edin Rustemović (released) |

=== Kozara ===
In: Note: Flags indicate national team as defined under FIFA eligibility rules; some limited exceptions apply. Players may hold more than one non-FIFA nationality.

| No. | Pos. | Nation | Player |
|---|---|---|---|
| 1 | GK | BIH | Miodrag Dabić (from Kozara U17) |
| 2 | DF | BIH | Darko Medić (from Laktaši) |
| 5 | DF | BIH | Ognjen Dragičević (from Jedinstvo Žeravica) |
| 7 | DF | BIH | Zlatan Bosnić (from Krajišnik Velika Kladuša) |
| 10 | MF | BIH | Miroslav Zorić (from Jedinstvo Žeravica) |
| 13 | DF | BIH | Mile Kovačević (from Kozara U19) |
| 14 | FW | BIH | Slaviša Vukajlović (from Kozara U17) |
| 15 | MF | BIH | Nemanja Paripović (from Laktaši) |
| 17 | MF | BIH | Miloš Šatara (from Kozara U17) |
| 19 | MF | GER | Amar Čekić (from (Germany) FC Ismaning) |
| 20 | FW | BIH | Nemanja Gavrić (from Kozara U17) |
| 21 | MF | BIH | Dejan Maksimović (from Kozara U17) |
| 24 | GK | BIH | Dario Borković (from Kozara U17) |
| –– | DF | BIH | Igor Makitan (from Kozara U19) |
| –– | DF | BIH | Srđan Knežić (from Kozara U19) |
| –– | MF | BIH | Velibor Kresojević (from Sloga Srbac) |
| –– | FW | CRO | Bojan Kumić (from Kozara U19) |

Out: Note: Flags indicate national team as defined under FIFA eligibility rules; some limited exceptions apply. Players may hold more than one non-FIFA nationality.

| No. | Pos. | Nation | Player |
|---|---|---|---|
| 1 | GK | SRB | Bojan Petrović (released) |
| 5 | DF | BIH | Nemanja Damjanović (released) |
| 7 | FW | BIH | Dejan Kojić (to Zvijezda Gradačac) |
| 10 | MF | BIH | Nebojša Pejić (to Sloga Doboj) |
| 11 | MF | BIH | Nenad Studen (released) |
| 12 | GK | BIH | Dalibor Kozić (to Borac Banja Luka) |
| 13 | DF | BIH | Irman Hodžić (to Jedinstvo Bihac) |
| 14 | FW | BIH | Šaban Pehilj (loan return to Željezničar Sarajevo) |
| 16 | DF | NED | Stefan Maletić (to Čelik Zenica) |
| 17 | MF | BIH | Nemanja Stjepanović (to (Slovenia) Rudar Velenje) |
| 18 | MF | BIH | Nemanja Stančić (to Jedinstvo Žeravica) |
| 19 | MF | BIH | Ognjen Gnjatić (to (Serbia) FK Rad) |
| 21 | MF | BIH | Bojan Letić (to Borac Šamac) |
| 22 | DF | BIH | Miodrag Gigović (to Rudar Prijedor) |

=== Ljubić ===
In: Note: Flags indicate national team as defined under FIFA eligibility rules; some limited exceptions apply. Players may hold more than one non-FIFA nationality.

| No. | Pos. | Nation | Player |
|---|---|---|---|
| — | DF | BIH | Aleksandar Railić (from Crvena Zemlja) |

Out: Note: Flags indicate national team as defined under FIFA eligibility rules; some limited exceptions apply. Players may hold more than one non-FIFA nationality.

| No. | Pos. | Nation | Player |

=== Mladost Velika Obarska ===
In: Note: Flags indicate national team as defined under FIFA eligibility rules; some limited exceptions apply. Players may hold more than one non-FIFA nationality.

| No. | Pos. | Nation | Player |
|---|---|---|---|
| — | MF | SRB | Miodrag Vasiljević (from (Serbia) Donji Srem) |
| — | FW | BIH | Neđo Šuka (from Sutejska Foča) |

Out: Note: Flags indicate national team as defined under FIFA eligibility rules; some limited exceptions apply. Players may hold more than one non-FIFA nationality.

| No. | Pos. | Nation | Player |

=== Mladost Gacko ===
In: Note: Flags indicate national team as defined under FIFA eligibility rules; some limited exceptions apply. Players may hold more than one non-FIFA nationality.

| No. | Pos. | Nation | Player |

Out: Note: Flags indicate national team as defined under FIFA eligibility rules; some limited exceptions apply. Players may hold more than one non-FIFA nationality.

| No. | Pos. | Nation | Player |

=== Modriča ===
In: Note: Flags indicate national team as defined under FIFA eligibility rules; some limited exceptions apply. Players may hold more than one non-FIFA nationality.

| No. | Pos. | Nation | Player |
|---|---|---|---|
| 11 | DF | BIH | Dragan Đaković (from Orašje) |
| 14 | DF | BIH | Jovan Vujanić (on loan from (Serbia) Sloboda Užice) |
| — | FW | BIH | Spasoje Savkić (from Crvena Zemlja) |

Out: Note: Flags indicate national team as defined under FIFA eligibility rules; some limited exceptions apply. Players may hold more than one non-FIFA nationality.

| No. | Pos. | Nation | Player |
|---|---|---|---|
| 27 | DF | DOM | Edward Acevedo Cruz (to Rudar Prijedor) |
| — | DF | BIH | Ranko Galešić (to Borac Šamac) |
| — | DF | BIH | Siniša Žerić (to Odžak 102) |
| — | DF | SRB | Dejan Ponjević (to Leotar) |
| — | MF | BIH | Vladanko Komlenović (to Radnik Bijeljina) |
| — | MF | BIH | Dejan Kostadinović (to (Austria) Kundl) |

=== Podrinje ===
In: Note: Flags indicate national team as defined under FIFA eligibility rules; some limited exceptions apply. Players may hold more than one non-FIFA nationality.

| No. | Pos. | Nation | Player |

Out: Note: Flags indicate national team as defined under FIFA eligibility rules; some limited exceptions apply. Players may hold more than one non-FIFA nationality.

| No. | Pos. | Nation | Player |
|---|---|---|---|
| 15 | FW | BIH | Zoran Nikić (to Radnik) |

=== Rudar Ugljevik ===
In: Note: Flags indicate national team as defined under FIFA eligibility rules; some limited exceptions apply. Players may hold more than one non-FIFA nationality.

| No. | Pos. | Nation | Player |
|---|---|---|---|
| — | GK | BIH | Aleksandar Novaković (free) |
| — | MF | BIH | Duško Bećarević (from Crvena Zemlja) |

Out: Note: Flags indicate national team as defined under FIFA eligibility rules; some limited exceptions apply. Players may hold more than one non-FIFA nationality.

| No. | Pos. | Nation | Player |
|---|---|---|---|
| — | GK | BIH | Boriša Bodiroga (from Rudar Prijedor) |
| — | MF | SRB | Nebojša Gavrić (loan return to (Serbia) Borac Čačak) |

=== Sloboda Mrkonjić Grad ===
In: Note: Flags indicate national team as defined under FIFA eligibility rules; some limited exceptions apply. Players may hold more than one non-FIFA nationality.

| No. | Pos. | Nation | Player |
|---|---|---|---|
| 5 | DF | BIH | Srđan Sakan (free) |
| 12 | GK | BIH | Nikola Đurić (from Laktaši) |
| 13 | DF | BIH | Nenad Bereta (from BSK) |
| 14 | MF | BIH | Sandro Dedić (from Borac Banja Luka U19) |
| 18 | MF | BIH | Milenko Devušić (from Crvena Zemlja) |
| — | FW | SRB | Uroš Stamenković (from (Serbia) Palilulac) |

Out: Note: Flags indicate national team as defined under FIFA eligibility rules; some limited exceptions apply. Players may hold more than one non-FIFA nationality.

| No. | Pos. | Nation | Player |
|---|---|---|---|
| 3 | DF | BIH | Nenad Vujčić (released) |
| 4 | DF | BIH | Senid Kulaš (to Iskra Bugojno) |
| 11 | MF | BIH | Stefan Dujaković (loan return to Borac Banja Luka) |
| 14 | MF | BIH | Aleksandar Petrović (to (Hungary) Orosháza) |

=== Sloboda Novi Grad ===
In: Note: Flags indicate national team as defined under FIFA eligibility rules; some limited exceptions apply. Players may hold more than one non-FIFA nationality.

| No. | Pos. | Nation | Player |
|---|---|---|---|
| — | DF | BIH | Nemanja Vejinović (from Rudar Prijedor) |
| — | MF | BIH | Arnes Brkić (from Krajišnik Velika Kladuša) |
| — | MF | BIH | Aleksandar Vrebac (from BSK) |
| — | MF | BIH | Mario Desnica (free) |
| — | FW | BIH | Nikola Zec (from BSK) |
| — | FW | BIH | Mladen Zgonjanin (free) |

Out: Note: Flags indicate national team as defined under FIFA eligibility rules; some limited exceptions apply. Players may hold more than one non-FIFA nationality.

| No. | Pos. | Nation | Player |
|---|---|---|---|
| — | GK | BIH | Vladimir Drljača (to Jedinstvo) |
| — | GK | BIH | Slobodan Majkić (released) |
| — | DF | SRB | Stevan Jovanović (loan return to Rudar Prijedor) |
| — | MF | BIH | Igor Golić (released) |
| — | MF | BIH | Mirko Tica (released) |
| — | FW | BIH | Ernest Šabić (to Sloga Bosanska Otoka) |

=== Sloga Doboj ===
In: Note: Flags indicate national team as defined under FIFA eligibility rules; some limited exceptions apply. Players may hold more than one non-FIFA nationality.

| No. | Pos. | Nation | Player |
|---|---|---|---|
| — | MF | BIH | Nebojša Pejić (from Kozara) |
| — | MF | BIH | Dino Dizdarević (from Krajina) |
| — | FW | BIH | Zlatko Đorić (from Radnik) |
| — | FW | BIH | Vladan Kujundžić (from Radnik) |

Out: Note: Flags indicate national team as defined under FIFA eligibility rules; some limited exceptions apply. Players may hold more than one non-FIFA nationality.

| No. | Pos. | Nation | Player |
|---|---|---|---|
| — | DF | BIH | Jasmin Bogdanović (to Zvijezda Gradačac) |
| — | MF | BIH | Bojan Đorđić (loan return to Leotar) |

=== Sutjeska Foča ===
In: Note: Flags indicate national team as defined under FIFA eligibility rules; some limited exceptions apply. Players may hold more than one non-FIFA nationality.

| No. | Pos. | Nation | Player |
|---|---|---|---|
| — | GK | SRB | Dragan Vojvodić (from (Serbia) Sloga Temerin) |
| — | DF | BIH | Darko Mitrović (from Gradina) |
| — | DF | BIH | Miljan Radonja (from Proleter Teslić) |
| — | MF | BIH | Stefan Tadić (from (Serbia) Srem Jakovo) |
| — | MF | SRB | Bojan Petković (from (Serbia) Dinamo Pančevo) |
| — | MF | BIH | Novo Papaz (from Proleter Teslić) |

Out: Note: Flags indicate national team as defined under FIFA eligibility rules; some limited exceptions apply. Players may hold more than one non-FIFA nationality.

| No. | Pos. | Nation | Player |
|---|---|---|---|
| — | MF | BIH | Nikola Danilović (to (Serbia) OFK Beograd) |
| — | FW | BIH | Neđo Šuka (to Mladost Velika Obarska) |

== First League of the Federation of Bosnia and Herzegovina ==
=== Bosna ===
In: Note: Flags indicate national team as defined under FIFA eligibility rules; some limited exceptions apply. Players may hold more than one non-FIFA nationality.

| No. | Pos. | Nation | Player |
|---|---|---|---|
| 2 | DF | BIH | Mustafa Mujezinović (from Olimpic) |
| 8 | MF | BIH | Mirsad Šiljak (from Iskra Bugojno) |
| 18 | MF | BIH | Armin Arnaut (from Čelik Zenica) |
| 22 | DF | BIH | Emrah Hasanhodžić (loan from Željezničar) |
| — | DF | BIH | Ermin Oruč (from Travnik) |
| — | MF | BIH | Nedim Bećirević (from Sarajevo II) |
| — | MF | BIH | Jurica Lendić (from Sloga Uskoplje) |
| — | MF | BIH | Mirza Čakić (from Rudar Breza) |

Out: Note: Flags indicate national team as defined under FIFA eligibility rules; some limited exceptions apply. Players may hold more than one non-FIFA nationality.

| No. | Pos. | Nation | Player |
|---|---|---|---|
| — | MF | BIH | Ervin Šeta (released) |
| — | MF | BIH | Mirza Džafić (to Podgrmeč) |
| — | MF | BIH | Edin Genjac (released) |
| — | MF | BIH | Adnan Hodžić (to Podgrmeč) |
| — | FW | BIH | Vedad Džafić (to Rudar Breza) |
| — | FW | BIH | Semir Đip (to Radnički Hadžići) |

=== Branitelj ===
In: Note: Flags indicate national team as defined under FIFA eligibility rules; some limited exceptions apply. Players may hold more than one non-FIFA nationality.

| No. | Pos. | Nation | Player |
|---|---|---|---|
| 1 | GK | BIH | Jasmin Ramić (from Turbina) |
| 2 | FW | CRO | Stanko Cvitković (from Neretvanac) |
| — | DF | BIH | Božo Musa (from (Croatia) Split) |
| — | DF | BIH | Jasmin Aličić (from Neretvanac) |
| — | MF | CRO | Igor Musa (free) |
| — | MF | USA | Adan Coronado (from (Montenegro) Kom) |
| — | MF | BRA | Alan do Nascimento (from Krajišnik) |
| — | FW | BIH | Ante Pinjuh (from Široki Brijeg) |

Out: Note: Flags indicate national team as defined under FIFA eligibility rules; some limited exceptions apply. Players may hold more than one non-FIFA nationality.

| No. | Pos. | Nation | Player |
|---|---|---|---|
| — | DF | BIH | Vlado Hrkač (released) |
| — | DF | BIH | Mario Benić (to Neretvanac) |
| — | MF | CRO | Mario Pinjuh (released) |

=== Bratstvo ===
In: Note: Flags indicate national team as defined under FIFA eligibility rules; some limited exceptions apply. Players may hold more than one non-FIFA nationality.

| No. | Pos. | Nation | Player |
|---|---|---|---|
| 4 | FW | BIH | Armin Mahović (from FAMOS-SAŠK) |
| 14 | DF | BIH | Mirza Rizvanović (from Sloboda Tuzla) |
| 19 | MF | BIH | Damir Murselović (from Sloboda Tuzla) |
| — | MF | BIH | Samir Efendić (from Sloboda Tuzla) |

Out: Note: Flags indicate national team as defined under FIFA eligibility rules; some limited exceptions apply. Players may hold more than one non-FIFA nationality.

| No. | Pos. | Nation | Player |
|---|---|---|---|
| — | DF | BIH | Semir Terzić (to Mladost Malešići) |
| — | MF | BIH | Dražen Lukić (to Bosna Mionica) |
| — | MF | BIH | Ahmet Trejić (to Jedinstvo Bihać) |
| — | MF | BIH | Nermin Huseinbašić (to Bosna Mionica) |
| — | FW | BIH | Miloš Galin (to Jedinstvo Bihać) |

=== Budućnost ===
In: Note: Flags indicate national team as defined under FIFA eligibility rules; some limited exceptions apply. Players may hold more than one non-FIFA nationality.

| No. | Pos. | Nation | Player |

Out: Note: Flags indicate national team as defined under FIFA eligibility rules; some limited exceptions apply. Players may hold more than one non-FIFA nationality.

| No. | Pos. | Nation | Player |
|---|---|---|---|
| — | MF | BIH | Muris Pirić (to (Croatia) Split) |
| — | MF | BIH | Kabir Smajić (to Priluk) |
| — | FW | BIH | Denis Hadžić (to Radnički Lukavac) |
| — | FW | BIH | Muhamed Muminhodžić (to Sloboda Tuzla) |

=== Čapljina ===
In: Note: Flags indicate national team as defined under FIFA eligibility rules; some limited exceptions apply. Players may hold more than one non-FIFA nationality.

| No. | Pos. | Nation | Player |
|---|---|---|---|
| 1 | GK | BIH | Adnan Kaltak (from Sloga Uskoplje) |
| 2 | FW | BIH | Anel Delalić (from Neretva) |
| 4 | MF | CRO | Matej Rozić (on loan from Zrinjski) |
| 5 | DF | CRO | Ivan Raić (from GOŠK) |
| 8 | MF | BIH | Edin Kozica (from FAMOS-SAŠK) |
| 15 | MF | BIH | Emil Sejtanić (from Višići) |
| 17 | MF | BIH | Darko Raguz (from Stolac) |
| — | DF | BIH | Viktor Šiljeg (from (Croatia) Zmaj Makarska) |
| — | FW | CRO | Ivan Drežnjak (on loan from Zrinjski) |

Out: Note: Flags indicate national team as defined under FIFA eligibility rules; some limited exceptions apply. Players may hold more than one non-FIFA nationality.

| No. | Pos. | Nation | Player |
|---|---|---|---|
| — | GK | CRO | Boris Bačak (was loan to Široki Brijeg) |
| — | DF | BIH | Dražen Mioćević (to Troglav) |
| — | MF | CRO | Ilija Rajić (released) |
| — | FW | BIH | Sabahudin Jusufbašić (to GOŠK) |

=== Goražde ===
In: Note: Flags indicate national team as defined under FIFA eligibility rules; some limited exceptions apply. Players may hold more than one non-FIFA nationality.

| No. | Pos. | Nation | Player |
|---|---|---|---|
| 1 | GK | BIH | Faris Efendić (free) |
| 4 | MF | BIH | Dženis Huseinspahić (from Travnik) |
| 15 | FW | BIH | Jasmin Suntić (free) |
| 18 | FW | BIH | Vedad Džafić (from Bosna) |
| — | DF | BIH | Edin Seko (from Unis Vogošća) |
| — | MF | BIH | Adis Čulov (from Rudar Kakanj) |

Out: Note: Flags indicate national team as defined under FIFA eligibility rules; some limited exceptions apply. Players may hold more than one non-FIFA nationality.

| No. | Pos. | Nation | Player |
|---|---|---|---|
| — | GK | BIH | Darjan Matović (to Sutjeska) |
| — | DF | BIH | Haris Korda (released) |
| — | DF | BIH | Anel Bekanović (to Krajišnik) |
| — | MF | BIH | Sinan Ramović (to GOŠK) |
| — | MF | BIH | Ajdin Nuhić (to Velež) |
| — | MF | BIH | Almir Raščić (released) |
| — | MF | BIH | Muhamed Zejnilhodžić (to (Austria) Bischofshofen) |
| — | FW | BIH | Darko Džebo (released) |

=== Iskra ===
In: Note: Flags indicate national team as defined under FIFA eligibility rules; some limited exceptions apply. Players may hold more than one non-FIFA nationality.

| No. | Pos. | Nation | Player |
|---|---|---|---|
| 3 | MF | BIH | Esmer Tanković (from Sloga Uskoplje) |
| 5 | DF | BIH | Senid Kulaš (from Sloboda Mrkonjić Grad) |
| 9 | FW | BIH | Amel Zec (from Sloga Uskoplje) |
| 15 | DF | CRO | Ljupko Vrljić (from Sloga Uskoplje) |
| 21 | DF | CRO | Mario Batinić (from (Croatia) Inter Zaprešić) |
| — | MF | BIH | Muhamed Mirvić (from Famos) |

Out: Note: Flags indicate national team as defined under FIFA eligibility rules; some limited exceptions apply. Players may hold more than one non-FIFA nationality.

| No. | Pos. | Nation | Player |
|---|---|---|---|
| — | GK | BIH | Adnan Keranović (released) |
| — | DF | BIH | Alvin Karadža (released) |
| — | MF | MNE | Almir Koljenović (released) |
| — | MF | BIH | Mirsad Šiljak (to Bosna) |
| — | MF | BIH | Emin Brkić (to Podgrmeč) |
| — | MF | CRO | Juro Pejić (to Travnik) |
| — | FW | BIH | Asim Zec (to (Czech Republic) Hradec Králové) |
| — | FW | BIH | Vladimir Karalić (to Rudar Prijedor) |
| — | FW | BIH | Mirnes Gurbeta (to (Croatia) HAŠK Zagreb) |

=== Jedinstvo ===
In: Note: Flags indicate national team as defined under FIFA eligibility rules; some limited exceptions apply. Players may hold more than one non-FIFA nationality.

| No. | Pos. | Nation | Player |
|---|---|---|---|
| 1 | GK | BIH | Vladimir Drljača (from Sloboda Novi Grad) |
| 6 | DF | BIH | Elvis Mešić (from Krajina) |
| 7 | MF | BIH | Adis Džaferović (from Krajišnik Velika Kladuša) |
| 8 | MF | BIH | Benjamin Dizdarić (from Krajina) |
| 11 | DF | BIH | Irman Hodžić (from Kozara) |
| 14 | MF | BIH | Endi Nuhanović (from Krajina) |
| 15 | DF | BIH | Fadil Čizmić (from Sarajevo II) |
| 16 | MF | BIH | Ahmet Trejić (from Bratstvo) |
| 18 | MF | BIH | Vahidin Ćahtarević (from Krajina) |
| 19 | FW | BIH | Miloš Galin (from Bratstvo) |
| 23 | FW | BIH | Amel Handžić (from Sarajevo II) |
| — | FW | BIH | Admir Mirvić (from Krajina) |

Out: Note: Flags indicate national team as defined under FIFA eligibility rules; some limited exceptions apply. Players may hold more than one non-FIFA nationality.

| No. | Pos. | Nation | Player |
|---|---|---|---|
| — | DF | BIH | Elvis Mehadžić (to Una) |
| — | DF | BIH | Edin Sejdić (released) |
| — | MF | BIH | Enis Brčkalić (to Radnički) |
| — | MF | BIH | Dino Toromanović (to Krajina) |
| — | FW | SRB | Amir Memišević (released) |
| — | FW | BIH | Semir Slomić (to Radnički) |
| — | FW | BIH | Muamer Gagula (to Radnik) |
| — | FW | BIH | Haris Harambašić (released) |

=== Krajina ===
In: Note: Flags indicate national team as defined under FIFA eligibility rules; some limited exceptions apply. Players may hold more than one non-FIFA nationality.

| No. | Pos. | Nation | Player |
|---|---|---|---|
| 3 | DF | BIH | Elvir Šušnjar (from Krajišnik) |
| 4 | DF | BIH | Beho Bečić (from Krajišnik) |
| 8 | MF | BIH | Dino Toromanović (from Jedinstvo) |
| 11 | FW | BIH | Armin Sinanović (from Jedinstvo Vučkovići) |
| — | MF | BIH | Adis Stombolija (from Rudar Prijedor) |

Out: Note: Flags indicate national team as defined under FIFA eligibility rules; some limited exceptions apply. Players may hold more than one non-FIFA nationality.

| No. | Pos. | Nation | Player |
|---|---|---|---|
| — | GK | BIH | Almin Abdihodžić (to Sarajevo) |
| — | DF | BIH | Elvis Mešić (to Jedinstvo) |
| — | MF | BIH | Vahidin Ćahtarević (to Jedinstvo) |
| — | MF | BIH | Endi Nuhanović (to Jedinstvo) |
| — | MF | BIH | Benjamin Dizdarić (to Jedinstvo) |
| — | MF | BIH | Dino Dizdarević (to Sloga Doboj) |
| — | MF | BIH | Muradif Hodžić (to Krajišnik) |
| — | MF | BIH | Dino Selimović (released) |
| — | FW | BIH | Admir Mirvić (to Jedinstvo) |

=== Krajišnik ===
In: Note: Flags indicate national team as defined under FIFA eligibility rules; some limited exceptions apply. Players may hold more than one non-FIFA nationality.

| No. | Pos. | Nation | Player |
|---|---|---|---|
| 2 | MF | BIH | Amir Mrzljak (free) |
| 5 | DF | BIH | Anel Bekanović (from Goražde) |
| 6 | MF | BIH | Muradif Hodžić (from Krajina) |
| 12 | GK | BIH | Armin Mešanović (free) |
| — | MF | BIH | Samir Sabić (free) |

Out: Note: Flags indicate national team as defined under FIFA eligibility rules; some limited exceptions apply. Players may hold more than one non-FIFA nationality.

| No. | Pos. | Nation | Player |
|---|---|---|---|
| — | GK | BIH | Anes Podunovac (to Podgrmeč) |
| — | DF | BIH | Dejan Širanović (to Orašje) |
| — | DF | BIH | Adis Džaferović (to Jedinstvo) |
| — | DF | BIH | Mirza Cejvanović (to Radnički) |
| — | DF | BIH | Elvir Šušnjar (to Krajina) |
| — | DF | BIH | Beho Bečić (to Krajina) |
| — | MF | BIH | Šerif Hasić (released) |
| — | MF | BIH | Arnes Brkić (to Sloboda Novi Grad) |
| — | MF | BRA | Alan do Nascimento (to Branitelj) |
| — | FW | BIH | Boban Zdjelar (released) |

=== Podgrmeč ===
In: Note: Flags indicate national team as defined under FIFA eligibility rules; some limited exceptions apply. Players may hold more than one non-FIFA nationality.

| No. | Pos. | Nation | Player |
|---|---|---|---|
| 6 | MF | BIH | Emin Brkić (from Iskra) |
| 19 | MF | BIH | Mirza Džafić (from Bosna) |
| 22 | DF | BIH | Emrah Ćosić (on loan from Velež) |
| — | GK | BIH | Anes Podunovac (from Krajišnik) |
| — | MF | BIH | Besim Ibričić (free) |
| — | MF | BIH | Adnan Hodžić (from Bosna) |
| — | FW | BIH | Muamer Salibašić (from (Czech Republic) Varnsdorf) |

Out: Note: Flags indicate national team as defined under FIFA eligibility rules; some limited exceptions apply. Players may hold more than one non-FIFA nationality.

| No. | Pos. | Nation | Player |

=== Radnički ===
In: Note: Flags indicate national team as defined under FIFA eligibility rules; some limited exceptions apply. Players may hold more than one non-FIFA nationality.

| No. | Pos. | Nation | Player |
|---|---|---|---|
| 2 | DF | BIH | Mirza Cejvanović (from Krajišnik) |
| 7 | FW | BIH | Denis Hadžić (from Budućnost) |
| 14 | MF | BIH | Enes Brčkalić (from Jedinstvo) |
| 17 | DF | BIH | Edis Zulić (from (Czech Republic) Česká Lípa) |
| 19 | FW | BIH | Šemsudin Džanić (from Bosna Kalesija) |
| 20 | MF | BIH | Edin Kitić (from Bosna Kalesija) |
| — | FW | BIH | Semir Slomić (from Jedinstvo) |
| — | FW | BIH | Mirnes Salihović (from (Austria) ASKÖ Stinatz) |

Out: Note: Flags indicate national team as defined under FIFA eligibility rules; some limited exceptions apply. Players may hold more than one non-FIFA nationality.

| No. | Pos. | Nation | Player |
|---|---|---|---|
| — | GK | BIH | Edin Ribić (to Sloboda Tuzla) |
| — | DF | BIH | Esmir Hasanović (released) |
| — | FW | CRO | Zlatko Tomić (released) |
| — | FW | BIH | Haris Ibrić (to Ingram Duboki Potok) |

=== Rudar ===
In: Note: Flags indicate national team as defined under FIFA eligibility rules; some limited exceptions apply. Players may hold more than one non-FIFA nationality.

| No. | Pos. | Nation | Player |
|---|---|---|---|
| 1 | GK | CRO | Ivan Tirić (from (Croatia) Zagreb U19) |
| 8 | MF | BIH | Josip Tomić (from (Croatia) Zagreb U19) |
| 17 | MF | BIH | Mirza Musić (from Mladost Kakanj) |
| 18 | DF | BIH | Amel Hrustanović (from Rudar Kakanj U19) |
| 19 | MF | BIH | Adis Goralija (from Mladost Kakanj) |
| 21 | DF | BIH | Edvin Šabotić (from Famos) |
| — | GK | BIH | Harun Strika (from Rudar Breza) |

Out: Note: Flags indicate national team as defined under FIFA eligibility rules; some limited exceptions apply. Players may hold more than one non-FIFA nationality.

| No. | Pos. | Nation | Player |
|---|---|---|---|
| — | GK | BIH | Amel Pjanić (released) |
| — | DF | SRB | Petar Matović (released) |
| — | DF | BIH | Damir Begić (released) |
| — | DF | BIH | Kenan Nemeljaković (released) |
| — | DF | BIH | Kenan Helja (to Mladost Kakanj) |
| — | MF | BIH | Adis Čulov (to Goražde) |
| — | MF | BIH | Dženan Duraković (to Travnik) |
| — | FW | BIH | Armin Duvnjak (to (Czech Republic) Baník Most) |

=== Sloboda ===
In: Note: Flags indicate national team as defined under FIFA eligibility rules; some limited exceptions apply. Players may hold more than one non-FIFA nationality.

| No. | Pos. | Nation | Player |
|---|---|---|---|
| 1 | GK | BIH | Eldin Ribić (from Radnički) |
| 3 | MF | BIH | Halil Mahmutović (free) |
| 4 | DF | BIH | Renato Gojković (from Sloboda Tuzla U19) |
| 6 | DF | BIH | Muhamed Omić (from Zvijezda Gradačac) |
| 9 | FW | BIH | Mirza Mešić (free) |
| 10 | MF | BIH | Aldin Šišić (from Čelik Zenica) |
| 11 | FW | BIH | Muhamed Muminhodžić (from Budućnost) |
| 14 | FW | COL | Phil Jackson (from Zrinjski) |
| 18 | DF | BIH | Tarik Cerić (from Velež) |
| 19 | DF | BIH | Matijas Pejić (from Orašje) |
| 25 | DF | BIH | Muamer Nezić (from Zvijezda Gradačac) |
| 77 | MF | BIH | Omar Prses (from Sloboda Tuzla U19) |
| 88 | MF | BIH | Edin Jusufović (from Sloboda Tuzla U19) |
| — | DF | BIH | Staniša Nikolić (from (Slovakia) Dunajská Streda) |
| — | DF | BIH | Mirza Musić (from Slaven Živinice) |
| — | FW | BIH | Semir Musić (from Sloboda Tuzla U19) |

Out: Note: Flags indicate national team as defined under FIFA eligibility rules; some limited exceptions apply. Players may hold more than one non-FIFA nationality.

| No. | Pos. | Nation | Player |
|---|---|---|---|
| 1 | GK | BIH | Denis Mujkić (to (Serbia) Novi Pazar) |
| — | DF | BIH | Muharem Civić (to (Czech Republic) MAS Táborsko) |
| — | DF | BIH | Kenan Čejvanović (released) |
| — | DF | BIH | Adnan Likić (released) |
| — | DF | BIH | Samir Jogunčić (released) |
| — | DF | BIH | Mirza Rizvanović (to Bratstvo) |
| — | MF | BIH | Muamer Zoletić (to Gradina) |
| — | MF | BIH | Samir Efendić (to Bratstvo) |
| — | MF | BIH | Damir Mureselović (to Bratstvo) |
| — | MF | BIH | Mirza Zonić (released) |
| — | MF | BIH | Emir Avdić (released) |
| — | MF | BIH | Mirza Hasanović (to Bosna Kalesija) |
| — | MF | BIH | Esmir Ahmetović (was on loan from (Serbia) Jagodina) |
| — | MF | BIH | Almir Bekić (was on loan from (Croatia) Dinamo Zagreb) |
| — | FW | BIH | Alen Mešanović (released) |
| — | FW | BIH | Emjir Kasapović (released) |
| — | FW | BIH | Jasmin Mešanović (to Čelik Zenica) |

=== Troglav ===
In: Note: Flags indicate national team as defined under FIFA eligibility rules; some limited exceptions apply. Players may hold more than one non-FIFA nationality.

| No. | Pos. | Nation | Player |
|---|---|---|---|
| 5 | DF | BIH | Dražen Mioćević (to Čapljina) |
| 6 | DF | BIH | Stipe Miloš (to Tomislav) |
| — | FW | CRO | Ivan Jurić (to Vitez) |

Out: Note: Flags indicate national team as defined under FIFA eligibility rules; some limited exceptions apply. Players may hold more than one non-FIFA nationality.

| No. | Pos. | Nation | Player |
|---|---|---|---|
| — | DF | BIH | Berislav Vrdoljak (End of career) |
| — | FW | BIH | Ivan Mamić (to Slavija) |

=== Vitez ===
In: Note: Flags indicate national team as defined under FIFA eligibility rules; some limited exceptions apply. Players may hold more than one non-FIFA nationality.

| No. | Pos. | Nation | Player |
|---|---|---|---|
| 3 | DF | BIH | Sanel Alić (from Gradina) |
| 6 | MF | BIH | Haris Hećo (from Čelik Zenica) |
| 9 | MF | BIH | Haris Dilaver (from Čelik Zenica) |

Out: Note: Flags indicate national team as defined under FIFA eligibility rules; some limited exceptions apply. Players may hold more than one non-FIFA nationality.

| No. | Pos. | Nation | Player |
|---|---|---|---|
| — | GK | BIH | Ismar Pojskić (to Krivaja) |
| — | DF | BIH | Senad Tabaković (to Travnik) |
| — | DF | CRO | Zdenko Jurčević (to Tomislav) |
| — | MF | BIH | Stjepan Badrov (to GOŠK) |
| — | MF | BIH | Ivan Rezdeusek (released) |
| — | FW | CRO | Goran Kusljić (released) |
| — | FW | CRO | Ivan Jurić (to Torglav) |

== See also ==
- Premier League of Bosnia and Herzegovina
- First League of the Republika Srpska
- First League of the Federation of Bosnia and Herzegovina
- 2012–13 Premier League of Bosnia and Herzegovina
- 2012–13 First League of the Republika Srpska
- 2012–13 First League of the Federation of Bosnia and Herzegovina
