= Feđa Dudić =

Bosnian football manager (born 1983)

Personal information
- Date of birth: 1 February 1983 (age 43)
- Place of birth: Sarajevo, SFR Yugoslavia
- Height: 1.75 m (5 ft 9 in)
- Position: Centre-forward

Team information
- Current team: Radnički 1923 (manager)

Youth career
- –2001: Sarajevo

Senior career*
Years	Team	Apps	(Gls)
2001–2002	Zagreb	2	(0)
2002	→ TŠK Topolovac (loan)	8	(0)
2003	Brotnjo	29	(9)
2004	Sloboda Tuzla	7	(0)
2004	Sarajevo	4	(1)
2005	Brotnjo	0	(0)
2005	Karlovac	1	(0)
2006–2007	Igman Konjic	0	(0)
2007–2010	Travnik	67	(37)
2008	→ Željezničar (loan)	5	(0)
2010–2011	Varaždin	18	(2)
2011	GOŠK Gabela	12	(3)
2012	Novi Pazar	2	(0)
2012–2014	Slavija Sarajevo	44	(7)
2014–2016	Travnik	56	(18)
2016	Zvijezda Gradačac	12	(5)
Total		267	(82)

Managerial career
- 2017–2018: GOŠK Gabela
- 2019–2022: Velež Mostar
- 2022: Sarajevo
- 2023–2025: Radnički 1923
- 2025–2026: Maribor
- 2026–: Radnički 1923
- * Club domestic league appearances and goals

Feđa Dudić (born 1 February 1983) is a Bosnian professional football manager and former player who is the manager of Serbian SuperLiga club Radnički 1923.

Born in Sarajevo, Dudić played for both hometown clubs FK Sarajevo and Željezničar, as well as other clubs in Bosnia and Herzegovina, Croatia and Serbia. He won the Croatian First League with Zagreb in 2002, as well as the Bosnian Cup with Sarajevo in 2005. He was the Bosnian Premier League top goalscorer in the 2009–10 season while playing for Travnik.

Dudić started his managerial career at GOŠK Gabela in 2017, managing the club until 2018. He became manager of Velež Mostar in 2019, achieving success with them by qualifying the club to the 2021–22 UEFA Europa Conference League, their first European competition after 33 years. Dudić won the Bosnian Cup with Velež in 2022. Following his success with Velež, Dudić left the club to become manager of Sarajevo in June, where he worked until October 2022. He was appointed manager of Serbian side Radnički 1923 in 2023, managing to qualify the club for UEFA competitions for the first time ever, before departing in 2025. Later that year, Dudić joined Slovenian Slovenian PrvaLiga club Maribor. After leaving Maribor, he returned to Radnički in 2026.

== Playing career ==
Born in Sarajevo, SR Bosnia and Herzegovina, SFR Yugoslavia, Dudić started his career playing in the youth teams of Sarajevo, but still young, he moved to Croatia where he became part of the Zagreb championship winning squad in the 2001–02 season.

He would have a short loan spell with another Croatian First League side, TŠK Topolovac before returning to Bosnia where he would play for several clubs during the following seasons, namely Sloboda Tuzla, Brotnjo, Sarajevo, with whom he won the 2004–05 Bosnian Cup, Travnik and Željezničar. He also played with Karlovac in the Croatian Second League during the 2005–06 season.

During the summer of 2010, and having become the 2009–10 Bosnian Premier League top goalscorer with 16 goals, Dudić came to Hajduk Split for a trial, however he ended up signing with another Prva HNL side, Varaždin, where he was a part of the team that finished as a Croatian Cup runner-up in the 2010–11 cup season.

In the summer of 2011, Dudić moved back to Bosnia, signing with newly promoted team GOŠK Gabela, but in the following winter break, newly promoted Serbian SuperLiga side Novi Pazar decided to reinforce their team with players from the Bosnian Premier League, bringing him alongside Admir Raščić.

After Novi Pazar, Dudić played for Slavija Sarajevo, Travnik again and Zvijezda Gradačac, before retiring in 2016 at the age of 33.

== Managerial career ==
=== Early career ===
After retiring, Dudić became an assistant manager at Travnik in 2016, where he stayed until June 2017.

=== GOŠK Gabela ===
On 27 November 2017, Dudić was named new manager of the club that he played in before, GOŠK Gabela, after manager Slaven Musa resigned. With GOŠK, he finished 7th in the 2017–18 Bosnian Premier League season.

In the 2018–19 season, GOŠK started off well under the guidance of Dudić, but after a series of poor results, which culminated with a 0–0 draw against Čelik Zenica, on 26 September 2018, Dudić resigned from the position of manager of GOŠK, after almost a year of him being the manager.

=== Velež Mostar ===
==== 2019–20 season ====
On 5 August 2019, Dudić became the new manager of Velež Mostar. In his first match as the club's manager, Velež tied 0–0 against Sloboda Tuzla away on 10 August 2019, winning their first point in the 2019–20 league season. His first win with Velež came on 17 August 2019, in a 1–0 home league win against Široki Brijeg. Dudić's first loss as Velež manager was a 2–1 away league loss against Sarajevo on 24 August 2019.

In his first ever Mostar derby, Dudić's Velež beat fierce city rivals Zrinjski Mostar 1–0 at home in a league match on 19 October 2019, marking that Velež's first Mostar derby win in over 5 years. He was also praised by Velež fans for his team's 0–2 away league win against Željezničar on 7 December 2019. Dudić's next big result came on 8 March 2020, when Velež beat Borac Banja Luka 2–1 at home in another league match.

==== 2020–21 season ====
In the first game of the 2020–21 season on 1 August 2020, Velež handled a tough 3–0 loss against Željezničar, but in the second game, on 8 August, Dudić's team managed to beat city rivals Zrinjski for a second time in a row.

On 31 October 2020, Velež got defeated by Zrinjski in the Mostar derby, with Dudić taking the blame.

On 28 December 2020, he extended his contract with the club until June 2023.

During the 2020–21 season, Dudić managed to make a new record with Velež by not losing 16 league games in a row, following a Mostar derby draw against Zrinjski on 8 May 2021. He finished the season in third, qualifying Velež for the 2021–22 UEFA Europa Conference League, their first European competition after 33 years. On 25 May 2021, Dudić was named the Bosnian Premier League Manager of the Season.

==== 2021–22 season ====
Dudić's Velež opened the 2021–22 season with the Conference League qualifying phase, firstly eliminating semi-professional Northern Irish club Coleraine. In the second qualifying round, his team, surprisingly, eliminated Greek giants AEK Athens. However, in the third qualifying round, Velež was eliminated by Swedish side IF Elfsborg, thus putting an end to their European "fairytale".

Velež started off the domestic league season well, beating newly promoted side Posušje on 19 July 2021. After beating Posušje, Dudić's team went into a short, three-game winless run, but ended it with a win against Široki Brijeg on 22 August 2021. Two months later, following a new string of poor results, Dudić resigned as Velež's manager after a disappointing league loss against Radnik Bijeljina on 31 October. However, the next day, the club's board rejected this and he stayed as manager.

On 19 May 2022, Dudić led Velež to win the first Bosnian Cup title in their history, after a penalty shoot-out, following a 0–0 draw against Sarajevo in the final.

=== Sarajevo ===
On 2 June 2022, Dudić signed a two-year contract with Sarajevo, with an option to stay at the club until at least 2025. In his first game in charge, Sarajevo defeated Borac Banja Luka on 24 July 2022.

After winning two more league games against Sloga Doboj and Posušje, on 10 August 2022, Dudić's side lost 5–1 to Tuzla City. It was Sarajevo's biggest ever Bosnian Premier League defeat in history. On 26 August, Sarajevo drew against Željezničar in Dudić's first Sarajevo derby as a manager.

On 19 October 2022, following a series of poor results, which culminated with a first round cup elimination by Čelik Zenica, Dudić resigned as manager, only four months after taking up the position.

=== Radnički 1923 ===
On 24 September 2023, Dudić signed a contract with Serbian SuperLiga club Radnički 1923. At the time of his appointment, the team were sitting in bottom after seven league games. On 1 October 2023, he debuted with a 2–0 away win over Železničar Pančevo. Radnički reached the Serbian Cup semi-finals, where they were eliminated by Vojvodina following a late game winner. At the end of the season, Radnički managed to finish in fifth place and qualified for the 2024–25 UEFA Conference League second qualifying round. Dudić led the side to another fifth-place finish in the 2024–25 season, and due to OFK Beograd failing to obtain a UEFA license, Radnički qualified for the UEFA Conference League qualifiers for a second time in a row.

Following elimination from KÍ Klaksvík in the 2025–26 Conference League second qualifying round, Dudić resigned as Radnički manager on 1 August 2025.

=== Maribor ===
On 1 October 2025, Dudić was appointed as the new manager of Slovenian side Maribor, becoming the third manager to lead the team during the 2025–26 season. His first match with the side ended in a 3–0 home win over Domžale on 4 October.

== Managerial statistics ==
As of match played 22 November 2026

Managerial record by team and tenure
Team	From	To	Record							
Team	From	To	G	W	D	L	GF	GA	GD	Win %
GOŠK Gabela	27 November 2017	26 September 2018	28	11	9	8	31	32	−1	39.29
Velež Mostar	5 August 2019	1 June 2022	99	50	26	23	146	95	+51	50.51
Sarajevo	2 June 2022	19 October 2022	15	5	4	6	22	25	−3	33.33
Radnički 1923	24 September 2023	1 August 2025	78	38	14	26	131	107	+24	48.72
Maribor	1 October 2025	5 May 2026	22	9	6	7	35	24	+11	40.91
Radnički 1923	12 June 2026	Present	17	7	2	8	23	23	+0	41.18
Total			259	120	61	78	388	306	+82	46.33

== Honours ==
=== Player ===
Zagreb

- Croatian First League: 2001–02

Sarajevo

- Bosnian Cup: 2004–05

Travnik

- First League of FBiH: 2006–07

Individual

- Bosnian Premier League top scorer: 2009–10

=== Manager ===
Velež Mostar

- Bosnian Cup: 2021–22

Individual

- Bosnian Premier League Manager of the Season: 2020–21
