= Ćavar =

Ćavar is a Croatian surname. The surname has etymological origin in the Venetian word ciavarro, meaning a one-year-old ram. Notable people with the surname include:

- Ivona Ćavar (born 1995), Bosnian-Herzegovinian karate competitor
- Josip Cavar (born 1993), Swedish handball player
- Marijan Ćavar (born 1998), Bosnian-Herzegovinian footballer
- Marin Cavar (born 1999), Swiss footballer
- Patrik Ćavar (born 1971), Croatian handball player

== See also ==
- Ciavarro, Italian surname
- Šiljeg, a Croatian surname of similar etymological meaning

== Bibliography ==
=== Journals ===
- Lukač, Zrinka; Vladić-Mandarić, Lidija (2020). "Evaluacija kulturno-umjetničkog amaterizma Tomislavgrada" (PDF). Suvremena pitanja. XV (30): 124–147.
