= Selmir =

Selmir is a given name. Notable people with the name include:

- Selmir (footballer) (born 1979), full name Selmir dos Santos Bezerra, Brazilian footballer
- Selmir Pidro (born 1998), Bosnian footballer
- Selmir Miscic (born 2003), American soccer player

== See also ==
- Semir (given name)
