= Krešimir Bandić =

Bosnian footballer (1995–2019)

Personal information
- Date of birth: 16 September 1995
- Place of birth: Mostar, Bosnia and Herzegovina
- Date of death: 5 March 2019 (aged 23)
- Height: 1.82 m (6 ft 0 in)
- Position: Goalkeeper

Youth career
- –2013: Zrinjski Mostar

Senior career*
Years	Team	Apps	(Gls)
2013–2017	Zrinjski Mostar		
2014–2015	→ Branitelj (loan)		
2017–2019	Široki Brijeg	9	(0)
- * Club domestic league appearances and goals

Krešimir Bandić (16 September 1995 – 5 March 2019) was a Bosnian professional footballer who played as a goalkeeper.

== Death ==
On 5 March 2019, Bandić died of a heart attack aged 23.
