= Viktor Derbunov =

Russian footballer

Personal information
- Full name: Viktor Ivanovich Derbunov
- Date of birth: January 7, 1967 (age 59)
- Place of birth: Moscow, Russian SFSR, Soviet Union
- Height: 1.82 m (6 ft 0 in)
- Position: Goalkeeper

Senior career*
Years	Team	Apps	(Gls)
1985–1988	FC Dynamo Moscow	1	(0)
1988–1989	FC Krasnaya Presnya Moscow	60	(0)
1990	FC Spartak Moscow	0	(0)
1991	FK Lokomotiva Mostar		
1992	FC Veres Rivne	26	(0)
1992–1993	Atlas	10	(0)
1994	FC Rossiya Moscow	34	(0)
1994–1995	Happy Valley		
1997–1998	Hong Kong Rangers FC		
1998–1999	Golden		
- * Club domestic league appearances and goals

Viktor Ivanovich Derbunov (Russian: Виктор Иванович Дербунов; born January 7, 1967) is a retired Russian professional football goalkeeper.

During his career he played with FC Dynamo Moscow, FC Krasnaya Presnya Moscow and FC Spartak Moscow in the Soviet League, FK Lokomotiva Mostar in Yugoslavia, FC Veres Rivne in Ukraine, F.C. Atlas in Mexico, Russian FC Rossiya Moscow and Happy Valley, Hong Kong Rangers FC and Golden in Hong-Kong.
