= Semir =

Semir may refer to:

- Semir (given name), an alternate form of the Arabic given name Samir
- Semir (company), a Chinese clothing company
