= Miodrag Medan =

Bosnian Serb former footballer (born 1970)

Personal information
- Full name: Miodrag Medan
- Date of birth: 27 April 1970 (age 56)
- Place of birth: Mostar, SFR Yugoslavia
- Position: Striker

Senior career*
Years	Team	Apps	(Gls)
- Lokomotiva Mostar
- Bačka BP
1993–1995	Rad	12	(1)
1995–1996	Paniliakos	19	(4)
1996–1998	Panionios	54	(18)
1998–1999	PAS Giannina	30	(16)
1999–2000	Ethnikos Piraeus	30	(8)
2000–2002	Panelefsiniakos		
2002–2004	Ilisiakos		
2004	Athinais		
- * Club domestic league appearances and goals

Miodrag Medan (Serbian Cyrillic: Миодраг Медан; born 27 April 1970) is a Bosnian Serb former footballer who played as a forward for clubs in Yugoslavia and Greece.

== Club career ==
Born in Mostar, SR Bosnia and Herzegovina, SFR Yugoslavia, Medan began his career playing for local side FK Lokomotiva Mostar. He would spend the next few seasons in Serbian football with FK Bačka (BP) and FK Rad.

In December 1995, Medan joined Greek first division side Paniliakos F.C. for six months, appearing in 19 league matches for the club. He moved to Greek second division side Panionios F.C. for the following two seasons, helping the club promote to the first division where he led the team in goal-scoring and won the Greek Cup in his second season.

Medan would spend the rest of his playing career in the lower levels of Greek football, leading the second division in goal-scoring while at PAS Giannina F.C. in the 1998–99 season. He also played for Ethnikos Piraeus F.C., Panelefsiniakos F.C., Ilisiakos F.C. and Athinais before retiring.

== Honours ==
Panionios

- Greek Cup: 1997–98
