= Likić =

Likić is a surname. Notable people with the surname include:

- Adnan Likić (born 1986), Bosnian footballer
- Brano Likić (born 1954), Bosnian composer, producer, and performer
- Slavenko Likić (born 1974), Bosnian speed skater

== See also ==
- Lukić
