= Philip Jackson =

Phil, Phillip, or Philip Jackson may refer to:

== Sportsmen ==
- Phil Jackson (rugby league, born 1932), British rugby league back during 1950s
- Phil Jackson (born 1945), American basketball player and coach in NBA
- Phil Jackson (rugby league 1970s), British rugby league forward during 1970s
- Phil Jackson (boxer) (born 1964), American heavyweight boxer

== Others ==
- Philip Jackson (surveyor) (1802–1879), British Royal Navy lieutenant and mapmaker during 1820s
- Philip L. Jackson (1893–1953), publisher of Portland newspaper The Oregon Journal
- Philip Jackson (sculptor) (born 1944), Scottish sculptor
- Philip Jackson (actor) (born 1948), English actor
- Norton Buffalo (born Phillip Jackson; 1951–2009), American blues harmonica player

== See also ==
- Phil Jackson Ibargüen (born 1985), Colombian footballer
- Jackson (surname)
