= Ciavarro =

Ciavarro is an Italian surname. Notable people with the surname include:

- Luigi Ciavarro (fl. 1961–1974), Italian actor
- Massimo Ciavarro (born 1957), Italian actor

== See also ==
- Ćavar, Croatian surname
