= 2022 Bosnia and Herzegovina Football Cup final =

- The match took place at Bilino Polje Stadium
- Event: 2021–22 Bosnian Cup
Sarajevo	Velež Mostar
0	0
- Velež won 4–3 on penalties
- Date: 19 May 2022
- Venue: Bilino Polje Stadium, Zenica
- Referee: Irfan Peljto (Sarajevo)
- Attendance: 9,000

The 2022 Bosnia and Herzegovina Football Cup final was an association football match played at Bilino Polje Stadium in Zenica, Bosnia and Herzegovina, on 19 May 2022. Sarajevo and Velež Mostar were the finalists.

Velež won the trophy for the first time in the club's history. As winners, Velež qualified for the 2022–23 UEFA Europa Conference League.

== Route to the final ==
Sarajevo		Round	Velež Mostar	
Opponent	Result		Opponent	Result
Modriča	4–1	First round	Zvijezda 09	3–0
Ljubić Prnjavor	1–0	Second round	Sloga Uskoplje	6–0
Sloboda Tuzla	2–0 (agg.)	Quarter-finals	Široki Brijeg	4–1 (agg.)
Igman Konjic	4–0 (agg.)	Semi-finals	Tuzla City	5–0 (agg.)

== Match ==
=== Details ===
19 May 2022
19:00

Sarajevo	0–0	Velež Mostar
	Report
Penalties
Suljić (penalty scored); Varešanović (penalty missed); Šećerović (penalty scored); Oremuš (penalty missed); Bodul (penalty scored)	3–4	(penalty scored) Ovčina; (penalty scored) Haskić; (penalty missed) Zvonić; (penalty scored) Pršeš; (penalty scored) Brandao

Bilino Polje Stadium, Zenica
Attendance: 9,000
Referee: Irfan Peljto (Sarajevo)

Sarajevo	Velež Mostar

Match rules

- 90 minutes
- Penalty shoot-out if scores level
- Nine named substitutes
- Maximum of five substitutions
