= Leon Gardikiotis =

Football coach (born 1964)

Personal information
- Full name: Leonidas Gardikiotis
- Date of birth: 27 February 1964 (age 62)
- Place of birth: Lindau, West Germany
- Position: Striker

Senior career*
Years	Team	Apps	(Gls)
1984	Sydney Olympic		
1985	AEL		
1986	Doxa Drama		
1988	Canberra		

Managerial career
- 1995: West Wanderers
- 1999–2000: Tahiti
- 2001: Canberra Cosmos
- 2004: Whittlesea Stallions
- 2005–2006: Panachaiki
- 2007: Springvale White Eagles
- 2008–2009: Niki Volos
- 2009–2010: Lamia
- * Club domestic league appearances and goals

Leon Gardikiotis (Greek: Λέων Γαρδικιώτης, born 27 February 1964) is a Greek-Australian soccer coach and retired player. He was the head coach of the Tahiti national team at the 2000 OFC Nations Cup.

== Playing career ==
Gardikiotis was born in Germany by Greek parents, and moved to Australia at the age of two. He signed his first professional contract with Greek club AEL in 1985 and also played for Doxa Drama. He also went to play in Australia for St. George, Sydney Olympic, Canberra, Marrickville Olympic, Heidelberg and Wollongong Wolves.

== Coaching career ==
Transitioning into coaching at the age of 31 after retiring from playing following an injury, Gardikiotis initially was the Head Coach for West Wanderers FC, a second tier club in 1995. He then ventured into the top-tier, working for Wollongong Wolves FC as the assistant 1st team coach in the Australian National League under Beri Mariani. His next assignment as an associate staff coach at the Brazilian Football Academy (BFA) in Rio de Janeiro further enriched his coaching acumen, earning him a senior coaching Diploma. Gardikiotis's coaching journey continued as he assumed the role of Technical Director of the Football Academy of Excellence in Sydney (FAE), representing the BFA in the Oceania region, and being recognised by FIFA and Football Australia. Notably, he coached the Fijian National U17's and U20s teams, achieving significant success in the Oceania World Cup qualifiers. In 1999, Gardikiotis was appointed as the National Coach of the Tahiti senior team, leading them in the Oceania Nations Cup and various other international competitions.

In the 2000/01 Australian National Soccer League season, Gardikiotis became Head Coach of Canberra Cosmos and then it was followed by coaching Whittlesea Stallions in season 2003/04.

On 7 September 2005, it was announced that Gardikiotis would become the assistant coach of Greek Beta Ethniki side Panachaiki, under head coach Ken Warden. When Warden was released six days later, Gardikiotis became the head coach.

In 2007, Gardikiotis was head coach of Victorian Premier League side Springvale White Eagles. In 2008, he was the head coach of Niki Volos in Greece, followed by Lamia in 2009.
