= League of Hercegovina-Neretva Canton =

Bosnia and Herzegovina football league

League of Hercegovina-Neretva Canton (Bosnian: Županijska/Kantonalja Liga NS HNK/Ž) is a fourth level league in the Bosnia and Herzegovina football league system. The league champion is promoted to the Second League of the Federation of Bosnia and Herzegovina - South.

== Member clubs ==
List of clubs competing in 2020–21 season:

- FK Blagaj
- NK Buna
- NK Cim
- FK Iskra Stolac
- HNK Kruševo
- FK Lokomotiva Mostar
- NK Međugorje
- NK Mostar
- NK Sport Talent Mostar
- HNK Višići
