= 2021–22 Bosnia and Herzegovina Football Cup =

Football tournament season

26th Bosnia and Herzegovina Football Cup
- Bilino Polje Stadium hosted the final on 19 May 2022

Tournament details
- Country: Bosnia and Herzegovina
- Teams: 32

Final positions
- Champions: Velež Mostar (1st title)
- Runners-up: Sarajevo

Tournament statistics
- Matches played: 37
- Goals scored: 97 (2.62 per match)
- Top goal scorer(s): Petar Bojo; Alen Dejanović; Sedin Ljuca (3 goals)

The 2021–22 Bosnia and Herzegovina Football Cup was the 26th edition of Bosnia and Herzegovina's annual football cup, and the twenty first season of the unified competition.

Sarajevo were the defending champions. Velež Mostar won the cup after beating Sarajevo in the final.

== Participating teams ==
The following teams took part in the 2021–22 Bosnia and Herzegovina Football Cup.

2021–22 Premier League (12 teams)	2021–22 FBiH Cup (II) (12 teams)	2021–22 Republika Srpska (II) (7 teams)	Football Association of Republika Srpska (1 team)
Željezničar; Leotar; Rudar Prijedor; Posušje; Radnik Bijeljina; Sarajevo^{title holder}; Sloboda Tuzla; Široki Brijeg; Tuzla City; Zrinjski Mostar; Velež Mostar; Borac Banja Luka	First League of FBiH (II): Goražde; GOŠK Gabela; Gradina; Igman Konjic; Zvijezda Gradačac; Travnik; Second League of FBiH (III): Svatovac Poljice (group North); Rudar Han Bila (group West); Čapljina (group South); Klis Buturović Polje (group South); Sloga Uskoplje (group South); Stupčanica Olovo (group Center)	Krupa; Modriča; Ljubić Prnjavor; Omarska; Sloboda Novi Grad; Zvijezda 09; Željezničar Banja Luka	Sloboda Mrkonjić Grad (group West)

Roman number in brackets denote the level of respective league in Bosnian football league system

== Calendar ==
Round	Date(s)
1st Round	20 September 2021 (draw); 28 and 29 September 2021, 6 October 2021
2nd Round	13 October 2021 (draw); 27 October 2021
Quarter final	16 February 2021 (draw); 2 March 2022 (leg 1); 16 March 2022 (leg 2)
Semi final	29 March 2022 (draw); 6 April 2022 (leg 1); 20 April 2022 (leg 2)
Final	19 May 2022

== Bracket ==
Quarter-finals
Sarajevo	2	0	2
Sloboda Tuzla	0	0	0
Zvijezda Gradačac	0	1	1
Igman Konjic	1	3	4
Velež Mostar	4	0	4
Široki Brijeg	0	1	1
Tuzla City	0	2	2 (4)
Borac Banja Luka	1	1	2 (3)

Semi-finals
Sarajevo	2	2	4
Igman Konjic	0	0	0
Velež Mostar	4	1	5
Tuzla City	0	0	0

Final
Sarajevo	0 (3)
Velež Mostar	0 (4)

== First round ==
Played on 28, 29 September and 6 October 2021.

Home team	Away team	Result
Krupa (II)	Zvijezda Gradačac (II)	0–2
Sloboda Novi Grad (II)	Leotar (I)	1–2
Zvijezda 09 (II)	Velež Mostar (I)	0–3
Čapljina (III)	Radnik Bijeljina (I)	1–2
Goražde (II)	Sloboda Tuzla (I)	0–2
Sloga Uskoplje (II)	Željezničar Banja Luka (II)	1–0
Klis Buturović Polje (III)	Igman Konjic (II)	0–1
Ljubić Prnjavor (II)	GOŠK Gabela (II)	1–0
Modriča (II)	Sarajevo (I)	1–4
Mrkonjic Grad (II)	Široki Brijeg (I)	0–1
Omarska (III)	Rudar Prijedor (I)	2–1
Rudar Han Bila (III)	Željezničar (I)	0–6
Gradina Srebrenik (II)	Tuzla City (I)	2–5
Poljice (III)	Zrinjski Mostar (I)	1–2
Stupcanica (III)	Borac Banja Luka (I)	1–3
Travnik (II)	Posušje (I)	1–2

== Second round ==
Played on 27 October 2021.

Home team	Away team	Result
Zvijezda Gradačac (II)	Posušje (I)	2–1
Željezničar (I)	Tuzla City (I)	2–4
Sloga Uskoplje (II)	Velež Mostar (I)	0–6
Sarajevo (I)	Ljubić Prnjavor (II)	1–0
Leotar (I)	Borac Banja Luka (I)	1–2
Omarska (III)	Igman Konjic (II)	0–1
Radnik Bijeljina (I)	Široki Brijeg (I)	0–1
Sloboda Tuzla (I)	Zrinjski Mostar (I)	2–1

== Quarter-finals ==
First legs were played on 2 March, return legs were played on 16 March 2022.

Team 1	Team 2	Leg 1	Leg 2	Agg. score
Velež Mostar (I)	Široki Brijeg (I)	4–0	0–1	4–1
Sarajevo (I)	Sloboda Tuzla (I)	2–0	0–0	2–0
Zvijezda Gradačac (II)	Igman Konjic (II)	0–1	1–3	1–4
Tuzla City (I)	Borac Banja Luka (I)	0–1	2–1	2–2 (4–3 p)

== Semi-finals ==
First legs were played on 6 April, return legs were played on 20 April 2022.

Team 1	Team 2	Leg 1	Leg 2	Agg. score
Velež Mostar (I)	Tuzla City (I)	4–0	1–0	5–0
Sarajevo (I)	Igman Konjic (II)	2–0	2–0	4–0

== Final ==
The final was played on 19 May 2022.

=== Details ===
19 May 2022
19:00

Sarajevo	0–0	Velež Mostar
	Report
Penalties
Suljić (penalty scored); Varešanović (penalty missed); Šećerović (penalty scored); Oremuš (penalty missed); Bodul (penalty scored)	3–4	(penalty scored) Ovčina; (penalty scored) Haskić; (penalty missed) Zvonić; (penalty scored) Pršeš; (penalty scored) Brandao

Bilino Polje Stadium, Zenica
Attendance: 10,000
Referee: Irfan Peljto (Sarajevo)
