= Slaven Musa =

Bosnian footballer (born 1971)

- Musa in 2010

Personal information
- Date of birth: 21 June 1971 (age 55)
- Place of birth: Mostar, SFR Yugoslavia
- Position: Midfielder

Senior career*
Years	Team	Apps	(Gls)
1989–1992	Velež Mostar	52	(8)
1992–1993	Zrinjski Mostar		
1993–1994	Šibenik	31	(2)
1994–1995	Imotski		
1995–1997	Široki Brijeg	55	(7)
1997–2002	Zrinjski Mostar	127	(37)
Total		265	(54)

Managerial career
- 2007–2010: Branitelj
- 2010–2012: Zrinjski Mostar
- 2012: GOŠK Gabela
- 2012–2015: Široki Brijeg
- 2015–2016: Široki Brijeg
- 2016–2017: Vitez
- 2017: GOŠK Gabela
- 2018: Čelik Zenica
- 2018–2021: Bosnia and Herzegovina U19
- * Club domestic league appearances and goals

Slaven Musa (born 21 June 1971) is a Bosnian professional football manager and former player.

Musa is mostly known for playing for Zrinjski Mostar, spending six years in total at the club, from 1992 to 1993 and from 1997 to 2002. As a manager, he won the Bosnian Cup with Široki Brijeg in 2013.

== Playing career ==
Born in Mostar, Musa started his career at hometown club Velež in 1989. His next club was Velež's fierce city rivals Zrinjski Mostar, where he was the first captain of the club after its refurbishment in 1992.

Musla also played for Šibenik and Široki Brijeg. In 1997, he returned to Zrinjski, where he played the last five years of his career. He was one of the club's best players at the time. In 2001, Musa received the trophy "Filip Šunjić - Pipa" as best player of the club on field and outside of it for the 2000–01 season.

In the media he was often emphasizing his love for the club and its supporters. In 2002, Musa finished his playing career at the age of only 31.

== Managerial career ==
After finishing his playing career, Musa was an assistant coach at Zrinjski Mostar in the seasons 2002–03 and 2003–04. He led the first team in one match. After Zrinjski, he went to Branitelj and stayed the club manager for four years. In the meantime, Musa earned an UEFA Pro Licence.

His ambition was to be the manager of bigger clubs in the country, like Široki Brijeg or Zrinjski one day. In 2010, Musa and his team Branitelj made a sensation, by eliminating Premier League club Leotar from the Bosnian Cup.

In November 2010, he was appointed as Zrinjski manager, and his longtime wish finally came true. He stayed as manager of Zrinjski for about two years, before resigning after not as good results as he hoped six rounds before the end of the 2011–12 league season.

At the beginning of the 2012–13 season, Musa became new manager of GOŠK Gabela. He left the club after a series of bad results.

The same year Musa became the new manager of Široki Brijeg. In his first season with the club he won the Bosnian Cup beating Željezničar on penalties. After three years of managing Široki Brijeg, in April 2015, Musa was sacked. Though, after only five months after his firing, he was once again named manager of Široki. On his own behalf, he left the club in July 2016.

Musa then was the manager of Vitez from 2016 to 2017, GOŠK Gabela in 2017 and Čelik Zenica in 2018.

In June 2018, Musa became the new head coach of the Bosnia and Herzegovina U-19 national team. On 25 January 2020, he was named as an assistant of Bosnia and Herzegovina national team head coach Dušan Bajević.

== Honours ==
=== Player ===
Široki Brijeg

- First League of Herzeg-Bosnia: 1995–96, 1996–97

=== Manager ===
Široki Brijeg

- Bosnian Cup: 2012–13
