= Ivan Marinković (footballer) =

Serbian footballer

Personal information
- Full name: Ivan Marinković
- Date of birth: 31 October 1987 (age 39)
- Place of birth: Kruševac, SFR Yugoslavia
- Height: 1.83 m (6 ft 0 in)
- Position: Central midfielder

Youth career
- 1998–2004: Napredak Kruševac

Senior career*
Years	Team	Apps	(Gls)
2005–2009	Napredak Kruševac	4	(0)
2006	→ Goč Vrnjačka banja (loan)		
2007	→ Rudar Alpos (loan)		
2007–2008	→ Trayal Kruševac (loan)		
2009–2010	Rovigo Calcio		
2010–2011	Milano Kumanovo	8	(0)
2011	Napredak Kruševac	5	(0)
2012	Radnik Surdulica	10	(0)
2012–2013	Leotar Trebinje	37	(0)
2014	Sloga Kraljevo	5	(0)
2015-2018	Jedinstvo Vladimirci 1924		
- * Club domestic league appearances and goals as of 20 July 2014

Ivan Marinković (Serbian Cyrillic: Иван Маринковић; born 31 October 1987) is a Serbian retired football midfielder.
