= Semir (given name) =

Semir is the Turkish and Bosnian form of the Arabic given name Samir. Its corresponding feminine form is Semira or Semire. It may refer to:

- Semir Ben-Amor (born 1982), a Finnish professional ice hockey player
- Semir Bajraktarević (born 1987), a Bosnian footballer
- Semir Hadžibulić (born 1986), a Serbian-born Bosniak footballer
- Semir Kerla (born 1987), a Bosnian footballer
- Semir Osmanagić (born 1960), an author
- Semir Pepic (born 1972), an Australian judoka
- Semir Slomić (born 1988), a Bosnian footballer
- Semir Štilić (born 1987), a Bosnian footballer
- Semir Tuce (born 1964), a Bosnian footballer
- Semir Zeki (born 1940), a British and French neuroscientist
