= Marko Mijatović =

Serbian footballer

Personal information
- Full name: Marko Mijatović
- Date of birth: 2 July 1988 (age 38)
- Place of birth: Kotor, SFR Yugoslavia
- Height: 1.83 m (6 ft 0 in)
- Position: Attacking midfielder

Senior career*
Years	Team	Apps	(Gls)
2003–2006	Mladost Lučani	42	(14)
2006–2009	Bar	47	(11)
2009–2010	Beograd	10	(4)
2010–2011	Lushnja	16	(9)
2011–2012	Sloga Kraljevo	14	(2)
2012–2013	Slavija Sarajevo	8	(2)
2013–2014	Mladost DS		
2014	Livorno	2	(0)
2015	Jedinstvo Bihać	9	(4)
2016	Borac Šamac	10	(5)
2016	Nybro	2	(0)
2016	Sporting Kristina	16	(7)
2017	IFK S/RIF	13	(4)
2018-2019	Sävsjö FF	7	(2)
- * Club domestic league appearances and goals as of 1 February 2015

Marko Mijatović (Serbian Cyrillic: Марко Мијатовић; born 2 July 1988) is a Serbian retired football midfielder.

== Club career ==
After playing for OFK Bar in Montenegro, he moved in Belgrade, in club with the same name. Later, he played for Lushnja in Albanian First Division, Sloga Kraljevo, and Slavija Sarajevo in 2012.
