= 2010–11 Bosnia and Herzegovina Football Cup =

Tournament details
- Country: Bosnia and Herzegovina
- Teams: 32

Final positions
- Champions: Željezničar (4th title)
- Runners-up: Čelik

The 2010–11 Bosnia and Herzegovina Football Cup is the sixteenth season of Bosnia and Herzegovina's annual football cup, and an eleventh season of the unified competition. The competition started in September 2010 and will conclude with the final in May 2011. The winner qualified for the second qualifying round of the 2011–12 UEFA Europa League.

== Preliminary round ==
| Team 1 | Score | Team 2 |
|---|---|---|
| Doboj Istok | 2–2(4–2 p) | Odžak 102 |
| ECOS Vitez | 3–0 | Krajišnik Velika Kladuša |
| Maestral 95 Jajce | 0–6 | Sloga Uskoplje |
| UNIS Vogošća | 2–1 | GOŠK |
| Branitelj | 3–0 | Grude |
| Bosna Sarajevo | – | Usora |

== First round ==
These matches were played on 14 and 15 September 2010.

| Team 1 | Score | Team 2 |
|---|---|---|
| Borac Banja Luka | 2–0 | TOŠK Tešanj |
| Željezničar | 2–0 | Rudar Prijedor |
| Sarajevo | 2–1 | Sloga Uskoplje |
| Čelik Zenica | 2–0 | Velež |
| Bosna Sarajevo | 0–1 | Sloboda Tuzla |
| Proleter Teslić | 0–0 (4–3 p) | Drina Zvornik |
| BSK Banja Luka | 0–2 | Omladinac Mionica |
| Zrinjski | 3–1 | Budućnost |
| UNIS Vogošća | 2–1 | Modriča |
| Travnik | 0–1 | Kozara |
| Leotar | 1–0 | Zvijezda |
| ECOS Vitez | 0–1 | Olimpik |
| Slavija | 3–1 | Jedinstvo Bihać |
| Široki Brijeg | 6–0 | Sutjeska Foča |
| Branitelj | 7–0 | Doboj Istok |
| Sloboda Novi Grad | 1–0 | Orašje |

== Second round ==
The 16 winners from the previous round competed in this stage of the competition. The first legs were played on 29 and 30 September and the second legs were played on 19 and 20 October 2010.

| Team 1 | Agg. | Team 2 | 1st leg | 2nd leg |
|---|---|---|---|---|
| Leotar | 1–2 | Branitelj | 1–1 | 0–1 |
| Sarajevo | 7–2 | Sloboda Novi Grad | 4–1 | 3–1 |
| Borac Banja Luka | 0–3 | Željezničar | 0–0 | 0–3 |
| Čelik Zenica | 2–1 | Slavija | 1–1 | 1–0 |
| Kozara | 3–5 | Sloboda Tuzla | 1–1 | 2–4 |
| Olimpik | 5–2 | UNIS Vogošća | 3–1 | 2–1 |
| Proleter Teslić | 4–5 | Zrinjski | 4–2 | 0–3 |
| Omladinac Mionica | 2–4 | Široki Brijeg | 2–0 | 0–4 |

== Quarter-finals ==
The 8 winners from the previous round competed in this stage of the competition. The first legs were played on 3 and 4 November and the second legs were played on 10 November 2010.

| Team 1 | Agg. | Team 2 | 1st leg | 2nd leg |
|---|---|---|---|---|
| Zrinjski | 2–3 | Čelik Zenica | 2–0 | 0–3 |
| Sarajevo | 2–3 | Široki Brijeg | 2–2 | 0–1 |
| Olimpik | 2–2 (6–5 p) | Sloboda Tuzla | 1–1 | 1–1 |
| Željezničar | 9–0 | Branitelj | 6–0 | 3–0 |

== Semi-finals ==
The 4 winners from the previous round competed in this stage of the competition. The first legs took place on 23 and 30 March and the second legs took place on 6 April 2011.

| Team 1 | Agg. | Team 2 | 1st leg | 2nd leg |
|---|---|---|---|---|
| Željezničar | 1–1 (a) | Široki Brijeg | 0–0 | 1–1 |
| Čelik Zenica | 2–1 | Olimpik | 1–0 | 1–1 |

== Final ==
=== First leg ===
28 April 2011
19:30 CEST

| Željezničar | 1–0 | Čelik |
|---|---|---|
| Zeba 1' | Report |

Stadion Grbavica, Sarajevo
Attendance: 6,500
Referee: Goran Paradžik (Ljubuški)

=== Second leg ===
25 May 2011
19:30 CEST

| Čelik | 0–3 | Željezničar |
|---|---|---|
| | Report | Savić 12'; Zeba 71'; Stanić 73' |

Bilino Polje, Zenica
Attendance: 11,000
Referee: Midhat Arnautović (Lukavac)

Željezničar won 4–0 on aggregate.
