= Phil Jackson Ibargüen =

Colombian footballer (born 1985)

Phil Jackson
Personal information
- Full name: Phil Jackson Ibargüen Sanchez
- Date of birth: 2 February 1985 (age 41)
- Place of birth: Acandí, Colombia
- Height: 1.82 m (6 ft 0 in)
- Position: Forward

Senior career*
| Years | Team | Apps | (Gls) |
| 2004 | Cortuluá | 11 | |
| 2005 | Santa Fe | | |
| 2006 | Delfín S.C. | | |
| 2006–2008 | Paços de Ferreira | 2 | (0) |
| 2007 | → São João de Ver (loan) | 22 | (5) |
| 2008 | → Tondela (loan) | 21 | (6) |
| 2008 | FK Laktaši | 9 | (7) |
| 2009–2010 | Čelik Zenica | 12 | (3) |
| 2010–2011 | Sloga Uskoplje | 10 | (6) |
| 2011–2012 | Zrinjski Mostar | 14 | (0) |
| 2012–2013 | Sloboda Tuzla | 3 | (0) |
| 2013–2014 | Al-Ittihad Ibb | | |

International career
| 2004–2005 | Colombia U20 | 7 | (2) |
- * Club domestic league appearances and goals

Phil Jackson Ibargüen Sanchez (born February 2, 1985) is a Colombian former professional footballer who played as a Forward.

== Club career ==
Jackson began his career at Cortuluá in 2004 and Independiente Santa Fe in 2005 before moving to Ecuador to play with Delfín S.C. in 2006. Portuguese SuperLiga club Paços de Ferreira brought him in for the 2006–07 season, and in between he spent some time on loan to other Portuguese clubs. In summer 2008 he moved to Bosnia where he signed with FK Laktaši playing in the Premier League of Bosnia and Herzegovina. He will move to another Bosnian top league club Čelik Zenica in January 2009. In January 2011 he moved to a lower league Bosnian club Sloga Uskoplje but in the following summer he will sign with Bosnian top league club Zrinjski Mostar. He then played with Al-Ittihad SCC Ibb in Yemeni League.

== International career ==
Jackson was part of the Colombia under-20 national team.

Jackson Ibargüen was a victim of human trafficking.
