= Nebojša Pejić =

Bosnian footballer (born 1988)

Personal information
- Date of birth: 5 January 1988 (age 38)
- Place of birth: Zenica, SFR Yugoslavia
- Height: 1.79 m (5 ft 10 in)
- Position: Midfielder

Youth career
- OFK Beograd

Senior career*
Years	Team	Apps	(Gls)
2006–2011	BSK Borča	76	(0)
2011	Sloga Doboj		
2012	Kozara Gradiška	13	(1)
2012–2016	Rudar Prijedor	65	(3)
2015	→ Čelik (loan)	1	(0)
2017–2020	Springvale White Eagles	78	(8)

International career^{‡}
2008–2010	Bosnia and Herzegovina U17	3	(0)
2008–2010	Bosnia and Herzegovina U21	6	(1)
2011	Bosnia and Herzegovina	1	(0)
- * Club domestic league appearances and goals as of 29 May 2019 ‡ National team caps and goals as of 13 May 2013

Nebojša Pejić (Serbian Cyrillic: Небојша Пејић; born 5 January 1988) is a Bosnian-Herzegovinian former professional footballer who played as a midfielder.

== Club career ==
Born in Zenica (SR Bosnia and Herzegovina, SFR Yugoslavia), Nebojša Pejić begin playing in the youth team of OFK Beograd. His senior career started in 2006 in a local club from the suburbs of Belgrade named FK BSK Borča. The club was playing in the Serbian First League until 2009 when it won promotion to the Serbian SuperLiga. He made a total of 76 league appearances (29 of which in the SuperLiga) before leaving the club in summer 2011. He moved to Bosnia and Herzegovina, a country he represented internationally, and joined FK Sloga Doboj, a club playing in the First League of Republika Srpska, a second Bosnian tier. However, by the end of 2011 he was making his debut for the Bosnia national team, and moving to a top-level side FK Kozara Gradiška.

First played for the Bosnian under-17 side, and afterwards he represented Bosnian under-21 team before appearing for an unofficial Bosnia and Herzegovina selection on 16 December 2011, in a friendly match against Poland.

After moving to Australia, Pejić signed for Serbian-backed National Premier Leagues Victoria club Springvale White Eagles FC in January 2017 where he also Coached his first year in Australia as U12's Head Coach for Springvale White Eagles FC, as well he undertook a position with Futbal First Academy based at Forest Hill College.

== Honours ==
BSK Borča

- Serbian First League: 2008–09
