= Marin Cavar =

Swiss footballer (born 1999)

Personal information
- Date of birth: 18 June 1999 (age 27)
- Place of birth: Horgen, Switzerland
- Height: 1.93 m (6 ft 4 in)
- Position: Defender

Team information
- Current team: Brühl
- Number: 6

Youth career
- –2017: Zürich

Senior career*
Years	Team	Apps	(Gls)
2017–2018	Zürich U21	5	(1)
2017–2018	→ Winterthur U21 (loan)	24	(1)
2019	Winterthur	8	(1)
2017–2018	Winterthur U21	4	(0)
2019–2021	Chievo	2	(0)
2021–2023	Winterthur	0	(0)
2022	Winterthur U21	4	(0)
2022	→ Brühl (loan)	9	(0)
2023–	Brühl	88	(10)
- * Club domestic league appearances and goals as of 22 June 2026

Marin Cavar (born 18 June 1999) is a Swiss footballer of Croatian descent who plays as a defender for Brühl.

== Club career ==
In 2019, Cavar signed for Italian second division side Chievo after playing for Winterthur in the Swiss second division. On 4 August 2020, he debuted for Chievo during a 1–1 draw with Empoli.

On 3 August 2021, he returned to Winterthur on a two-year contract.

On 31 August 2022, Cavar moved to Brühl on a season-long loan. On 14 January 2023, Cavar's contract with Winterthur was terminated by mutual consent.

== Career statistics ==
As of 8 May 2021

Appearances and goals by club, season and competition
Club	Season	League			Cup		Total	
Club	Season	Division	Apps	Goals	Apps	Goals	Apps	Goals
Winterthur	2018–19	Swiss Challenge League	8	1	-		8	1
Chievo	2019–20	Serie B	2	0	-		2	0
