= HNK Branitelj =

- Full name: Hrvatski nogometni klub Branitelj
- Founded: 1992; 34 years ago
- Ground: Stadion sportskog centra, Rodoč, Bosnia and Herzegovina
- Capacity: 1,000
- Manager: Ivan Bubalo
- League: League of Hercegovina-Neretva Canton
- 2020–21: 11th
Home colours	Away colours

HNK Branitelj (Croatian: Hrvatski nogometni klub Branitelj) is a football club based in Rodoč, Mostar in Bosnia and Herzegovina. They played the 2020–21 season at the 4th level of the Bosnia-Herzegovina football pyramid.

Their home ground is Stadion Sportskog Centra in Rodoč which holds about 1,000 people.

== History ==
The team has played in the second tier-Prva Liga FBiH following promotion in 2010–11 when they won Druga Liga FBIH. The team's biggest achievement is playing in the quarterfinals of Bosnia and Herzegovina Football Cup when they were defeated by FK Željezničar 9–0 on aggregate. On their road to quarterfinals they defeated HNK Grude 3–0, NK Doboj Istok 7–0 and club from Premier League of Bosnia and Herzegovina FK Leotar 2–1 on aggregate. They were managed by Slaven Musa at the time. They archived the same stage of the national cup the next year, leaving behind FK Dizdaruša and FK Rudar Kakanj, being defeated by a club from Premier League of Bosnia and Herzegovina and also from the city of Mostar, FK Velež by 3–1 on aggregate.

== Club seasons ==
Sources :

Season	League									Cup	Europe
Season	Division	P	W	D	L	F	A	Pts	Pos	Cup	Europe
2011–12	First League of FBiH	30	12	4	14	43	42	40	10th	QF	
2012–13	First League of FBiH	28	13	5	10	43	41	44	3rd		
2013–14	First League of FBiH	30	11	6	13	39	32	39	11th		
2014–15	First League of FBiH	30	8	11	11	20	25	35	10th		
2015–16	First League of FBiH	30	7	6	17	23	44	24	14th ↓		
2016–17	Second League of FBiH – South	28	17	4	7	69	36	55	3rd		
2017–18	Second League of FBiH – South	28	7	2	19	30	64	23	14th		
2018–19	Second League of FBiH – South	26	4	6	16	32	68	18	13th		
2019–20	Second League of FBiH – South	14	1	1	12	12	51	4	15th ↓		
2020–21	League of Hercegovina-Neretva Canton	20	4	2	14	34	63	14	11th		

== Historical list of coaches ==
- (Bosnia and Herzegovina) Romeo Sapina (2006–2013)
- (Bosnia and Herzegovina) Slaven Musa (2007–2010)
- (Bosnia and Herzegovina) Zoran Bubalo (2011)
- (Bosnia and Herzegovina) Ivan Bubalo (2011–2016)
- (Bosnia and Herzegovina) Romeo Mitrović (2016)
- (Bosnia and Herzegovina) Ivan Bubalo (2016)

== Honours ==
- Second League – South:
  - Winners (1): 2010–11
