= Marko Nestorović =

Serbian footballer

Personal information
- Date of birth: 15 July 1984 (age 42)
- Place of birth: Belgrade, SR Serbia, Yugoslavia
- Height: 1.86 m (6 ft 1 in)
- Position: Right midfielder

Senior career*
Years	Team	Apps	(Gls)
- Red Star Belgrade
- OFK Beograd
2005–2009	Bežanija		
2005–2006	→ BASK (loan)		
2007–2008	→ BASK (loan)		
2009	Palilulac Beograd		
2010	Skënderbeu Korçë	11	(2)
2012	Sileks	14	(0)
2012–2014	Čelik Zenica	28	(1)
2015–2016	Dinamo Vranje	7	(2)
2017–2018	Avala 1939		

International career^{‡}
	Serbia and Montenegro U19	30	
- * Club domestic league appearances and goals as of 22 January 2016 ‡ National team caps and goals as of 22 January 2016

Marko Nestorović (Serbian Cyrillic: Марко Несторовић; born 15 July 1984) is a Serbian retired football midfielder who last played for FK Avala 1939.
