= Elvis Mešić =

Bosnia and Herzegovina footballer

Personal information
- Full name: Elvis Mešić
- Date of birth: 12 September 1981 (age 45)
- Place of birth: Bosanska Krupa, SFR Yugoslavia
- Height: 1.86 m (6 ft 1 in)
- Position: Defender

Youth career
- Bratstvo BK

Senior career*
| Years | Team | Apps | (Gls) |
| -2007 | Jedinstvo Bihać | | |
| 2007–2009 | Cibalia | 56 | (2) |
| 2009–2011 | Željezničar | 46 | (1) |
| 2011 | Ironi Rishon LeZion | 15 | (2) |
| 2012 | Krajina | | |
| 2012-2013 | Jedinstvo Bihać | | |
| 2013–2016 | Sloboda Novi Grad | | |
| 2016–2017 | Bratstvo BK | | |
- * Club domestic league appearances and goals

Elvis Mešić (born 12 September 1981) is a Bosnian former professional footballer who played as a defender.

== Club career ==
He started his career in a NK Bratstvo from his hometown. Good games for the club were a good recommendation for a transfer in Premier league side NK Jedinstvo Bihać. He later played for Croatian Prva HNL club HNK Cibalia and FK Željezničar for two seasons, respectively. In summer of 2011, he moved to Hapoel Ironi Rishon LeZion F.C. in the Israeli Premier League.
