= Adnan Likić =

Bosnia and Herzegovina footballer

Personal information
- Date of birth: 9 August 1986 (age 40)
- Place of birth: Tuzla, Bosnia and Herzegovina
- Height: 1.75 m (5 ft 9 in)
- Position: Defender

Youth career
- Sloboda Tuzla

Senior career*
Years	Team	Apps	(Gls)
2005–2007	Sloboda Tuzla	22	(0)
2007–2008	Slavonac	18	(2)
2008	Barcsi	4	(0)
2009	Suhopolje	5	(0)
2010	Šibenik	3	(0)
2010	Croatia Sesvete	0	(0)
2011	Karlovac	3	(0)
2012	Sloboda Tuzla	1	(0)
2013	Gradina	11	(1)
2014	Vinogradar		
2015–2021	Gradina		
- * Club domestic league appearances and goals as of 15 October 2011

Adnan Likić (born 9 August 1986) is a Bosnian-Herzegovinian retired football player. He has played as a defender for NK Karlovac in the Croatia Prva HNL.

== Club career ==
He later played for third tier OFK Gradina.
