= Semir Slomić =

Bosnian footballer

Semir Slomic
Personal information
- Full name: Semir Krle Slomić
- Date of birth: 14 January 1988 (age 38)
- Place of birth: Banovići, SFR Yugoslavia
- Height: 1.77 m (5 ft 9 1/2 in)
- Position: Forward

Youth career
- Budućnost Banovići

Senior career*
| Years | Team | Apps | (Gls) |
| 2005–2008 | Budućnost Banovići | 48 | (13) |
| 2008 | Sloboda Tuzla | 10 | (2) |
| 2009–2011 | Croatia Sesvete | 6 | (0) |
| 2009 | → Dinamo Zagreb (loan) | 0 | (0) |
| 2009–2010 | → Sloboda Tuzla (loan) | 11 | (2) |
| 2010–2011 | → Budućnost Banovići (loan) | 10 | (1) |
| 2011 | Sloboda Tuzla | 22 | (1) |
| 2012 | Jedinstvo Bihać | 11 | (2) |
| 2012–2013 | Radnički Lukavac | 19 | (4) |
| 2013–2014 | Budućnost Banovići | | |
| 2014 | SV Stripfing | 9 | (11) |
| 2015–2016 | SC Groß Enzersdorf | 0 | (0) |
- * Club domestic league appearances and goals as of 23 June 2013

Semir Slomić (born 14 January 1988 in Banovići) is a Bosnian retired football player, who played for FK Radnicki Lukavac in the Prva liga FBiH.

== Club career ==
The forward player played previously in Bosnia for FK Budućnost Banovići, FK Sloboda Tuzla, Jedinstvo Bihać and in the Prva HNL for NK Croatia Sesvete and Dinamo Zagreb.

He returned to hometown club Budućnost in summer 2013 and spent the latter years of his career in the Austrian amateur leagues.
