= Viktor Šiljeg =

Croatian footballer

Personal information
- Date of birth: 2 May 1992 (age 34)
- Place of birth: Ljubljana, Slovenia
- Position: Defender

Senior career*
| Years | Team | Apps | (Gls) |
| –2011 | Zrinjski Mostar | 0 | (0) |
| 2011–2012 | Zmaj Makarska | | |
| 2012–2014 | Čapljina | 38 | (2) |
| 2014 | Triglav Kranj | 8 | (0) |
| 2014–2016 | Jedinstvo Bihać | | |
| 2017 | Holzwickeder SC | | |
- * Club domestic league appearances and goals as of 19 January 2023

Viktor Šiljeg (born 2 May 1992) is a Croatian footballer who plays as a defender.

He played for Triglav Kranj in the Slovenian Second League.

== Personal life ==
He holds Slovene, Croatian and Bosnian citizenship.
