= FK Lokomotiva Mostar =

Association football team from Bosnia and Herzegovina

- Nickname: FK Lokomotiva
- Founded: 1918
- League: Kantonalna liga HNK

FK Lokomotiva Mostar is a football club from Mostar, Bosnia and Herzegovina.

The club was founded in 1918 as FK Željezničar. It played in lower league in Yugoslavia. After the independence of Bosnia and Herzegovina, they played a few seasons in Second League of the Federation of Bosnia and Herzegovina group South.

Junior and cadet teams of FK Lokomotiva play in the Youth league of Bosnia and Herzegovina - group South.
