= HNK Sloga Uskoplje =

HNK Sloga
- Full name: HNK Sloga Uskoplje
- Nickname(s): crveni (Reds)
- Founded: 1946
- Ground: Košute Stadium
- Capacity: 270 seated places
- League: 2 Liga FBiH South
Home colours	Away colours

HNK Sloga Uskoplje (full name: Hrvatski nogometni klub Sloga Uskoplje, English: Croatian Football Club Sloga Uskoplje) is a football club from Gornji Vakuf-Uskoplje, Bosnia and Herzegovina.

The club was formed in 1946 and its main colour is red.

== Achievements ==
- Herzeg-Bosnia Cup: Runners-up (1)

1996

- Bosnia and Herzegovina Football Cup: Second round (2)

2009/2010, 2010/2011

- Second league – South: Runners-up (1)

2011
